= List of Swedish football transfers winter 2010–11 =

This is a list of Swedish football transfers in the winter transfer window 2010–2011 by club.

Only transfers in and out between 1 January – 31 March 2011 of the Allsvenskan and Superettan are included.

On February 7, 2011, Örgryte IS and Qviding FIF announced plans for a possible merger of the two club in order to save Örgryte IS' failing economy, however this was later rejected on February 22. Meanwhile, on February 11, Örgryte IS filed for bankruptcy and it resulted in a forced relegation of the club to Division 1 Södra on February 16, while the club's position in Superettan was taken over by Qviding FIF. The transfers in the list below were done while Örgryte IS was still in the Superettan.

== Allsvenskan ==
=== AIK ===
In: Note: Flags indicate national team as defined under FIFA eligibility rules; some limited exceptions apply. Players may hold more than one non-FIFA nationality.

No.	Pos.	Nation	Player
—	FW	SLE	Ibrahim Bangura (from Köping FF)
—	MF	SWE	Yussuf Saleh (loan return from Syrianska FC)
—	DF	SWE	Alexander Milosevic (from Vasalunds IF)
—	MF	SWE	Martin Mutumba (from Videoton FC)
—	FW	GHA	Kwame Karikari (from Inter Allies)

Out: Note: Flags indicate national team as defined under FIFA eligibility rules; some limited exceptions apply. Players may hold more than one non-FIFA nationality.

No.	Pos.	Nation	Player
—	GK	CAN	Kyriakos Stamatopoulos (loan return to Tromsø IL)
—	FW	SWE	Saihou Jagne (to IF Brommapojkarna)
—	MF	LBR	Dulee Johnson (contract terminated)
—	GK	SWE	Nicklas Bergh (free transfer)
—	GK	FIN	Tomi Maanoja (to FC Honka)
—	FW	BRA	Antônio Flávio (on loan to São Caetano)
—	FW	CRO	Goran Ljubojević (contract termminated)
—	FW	SWE	Pontus Engblom (on loan to GIF Sundsvall)

=== BK Häcken ===
In: Note: Flags indicate national team as defined under FIFA eligibility rules; some limited exceptions apply. Players may hold more than one non-FIFA nationality.

No.	Pos.	Nation	Player
—	DF	SWE	Tibor Joza (from Falkenbergs FF)
—	MF	SWE	Björn Anklev (from Örgryte IS)
—	FW	LBR	Dioh Williams (from AGF)

Out: Note: Flags indicate national team as defined under FIFA eligibility rules; some limited exceptions apply. Players may hold more than one non-FIFA nationality.

No.	Pos.	Nation	Player
—	DF	SWE	Johan Lind (retired)
—	MF	SWE	Erik Friberg (to Seattle Sounders FC)
—	DF	SWE	Marcus Jarlegren (to Ljungskile SK)

=== Djurgårdens IF ===
In: Note: Flags indicate national team as defined under FIFA eligibility rules; some limited exceptions apply. Players may hold more than one non-FIFA nationality.

No.	Pos.	Nation	Player
—	DF	SWE	Joel Riddez (from Strømsgodset)
—	DF	USA	Gale Agbossoumonde (on loan from Traffic Sports)

Out: Note: Flags indicate national team as defined under FIFA eligibility rules; some limited exceptions apply. Players may hold more than one non-FIFA nationality.

No.	Pos.	Nation	Player
—	MF	SWE	Martin Andersson (free transfer)
—	MF	SWE	Sharbel Touma (to Syrianska FC)
—	FW	ZAM	Boyd Mwila (on loan to FC Trollhättan) (Note: Riedel, Jonas. "Boyd Mwila kvar i FC Trollhättan". dif.se (in Swedish). Djurgårdens IF Fotboll.)
—	DF	ARG	Luis Antonio Rodríguez (free transfer)
—	DF	SWE	Patrik Haginge (to Örebro SK)

=== GAIS ===
In: Note: Flags indicate national team as defined under FIFA eligibility rules; some limited exceptions apply. Players may hold more than one non-FIFA nationality.

No.	Pos.	Nation	Player
—	MF	SWE	Gzim Istrefi (from Carlstad United)
—	MF	CMR	Eric Bassombeng (from Örebro SK)
—	FW	SWE	Joakim Edström (from Västra Frölunda) (Note: "Två spelare från Frölunda är klara" (in Swedish). gais.se. 2011-01-03.)
—	DF	SWE	Alexander Angelin (from Carlstad United)
—	FW	NGR	Mohammed Abdulrahman (on loan from IF Elfsborg)
—	MF	SWE	Jesper Florén (on loan from IF Elfsborg) (Note: "Jesper hoppas på speltid i GAIS för att utvecklas" (in Swedish). elfsborg.se. 2010-07-16.)
—	FW	BRA	Álvaro Santos (on loan from Örgryte IS)
—	FW	LBR	Amadaiya Rennie (on loan from IF Elfsborg)
—	FW	BEN	Razak Omotoyossi (from FC Metz)
—	FW	BRA	Wánderson (on loan from Al-Ahli Jeddah)

Out: Note: Flags indicate national team as defined under FIFA eligibility rules; some limited exceptions apply. Players may hold more than one non-FIFA nationality.

No.	Pos.	Nation	Player
—	FW	NOR	Aram Khalili (loan return to IK Start)
—	FW	SWE	Joel Johansson (loan return to IF Elfsborg)
—	DF	SWE	Jesper Florén (loan return to IF Elfsborg)
—	MF	ISL	Guðmundur Reynir Gunnarsson (to KR Reykjavík)
—	FW	ISL	Guðjón Baldvinsson (to KR Reykjavík)
—	MF	SWE	Sandeep Mankoo (loan to Qviding FIF)
—	MF	SWE	Johan Pettersson (loan to Varbergs BoIS)
—	FW	SWE	Joakim Edström (loan to Varbergs BoIS)
—	MF	SWE	Erik Berthagen (loan to Varbergs BoIS)

=== Gefle IF ===
In: Note: Flags indicate national team as defined under FIFA eligibility rules; some limited exceptions apply. Players may hold more than one non-FIFA nationality.

No.	Pos.	Nation	Player
—	DF	SWE	Pär Asp (from IF Brommapojkarna)

Out: Note: Flags indicate national team as defined under FIFA eligibility rules; some limited exceptions apply. Players may hold more than one non-FIFA nationality.

No.	Pos.	Nation	Player
—	MF	NOR	Øyvind Gram (to free transfer)
—	FW	SWE	Daniel Westlin (free transfer)
—	DF	SWE	Omar Jawo (to Syrianska FC)
—	FW	SWE	Hans Berggren (retires)

=== Halmstads BK ===
In: Note: Flags indicate national team as defined under FIFA eligibility rules; some limited exceptions apply. Players may hold more than one non-FIFA nationality.

No.	Pos.	Nation	Player
—	DF	SWE	Pehr Andersson (loan return from Ängelholms FF)
—	MF	ESP	Ivan Diaz (from CD Leganés)
—	MF	ESP	Raúl (on loan from Real Madrid Castilla)
—	MF	ESP	Javi Hernández (on loan from Real Madrid Castilla)
—	MF	ESP	José Zamora (on loan from Real Madrid Castilla)
—	GK	ESP	Nauzet Perez (from AD Ceuta)

Out: Note: Flags indicate national team as defined under FIFA eligibility rules; some limited exceptions apply. Players may hold more than one non-FIFA nationality.

No.	Pos.	Nation	Player
—	DF	SWE	Per Johansson (free transfer)
—	FW	SWE	Emir Kujović (to Kayserispor)
—	MF	NED	Alexander Prent (free transfer)
—	DF	SWE	Tommy Jönsson (retires)
—	FW	BRA	Anselmo (to Botafogo (SP))
—	GK	SWE	Robin Malmqvist (on loan to Tromsø IL)
—	FW	SWE	Robert Guri Baqaj (on loan to LB07)
—	MF	ESP	Ivan Diaz (contract terminated)
—	GK	ESP	Nauzet Perez (contract terminated)

=== Helsingborgs IF ===
In: Note: Flags indicate national team as defined under FIFA eligibility rules; some limited exceptions apply. Players may hold more than one non-FIFA nationality.

No.	Pos.	Nation	Player
—	MF	SWE	Marcus Bergholtz (loan return from Ängelholms FF)
—	GK	SWE	Daniel Andersson (from Ängelholms FF) (Note: "Daniel Andersson återvänder till HIF" (in Swedish). hif.se. 2011-03-02.)

Out: Note: Flags indicate national team as defined under FIFA eligibility rules; some limited exceptions apply. Players may hold more than one non-FIFA nationality.

No.	Pos.	Nation	Player
—	DF	SWE	Fredrik Liverstam (to Landskrona BoIS) (Note: "Klart med ny mittback" (in Swedish). landskronabois.com. 2010-11-11.)
—	MF	SWE	Marcus Lantz (free transfer)
—	DF	SWE	Joel Ekstrand (to Udinese)
—	GK	SWE	Oscar Berglund (on loan to Assyriska FF)
—	MF	SWE	Samuel Aziz (loan to Ängelholm)
—	FW	SWE	Mohamed Ramadan (loan to Ängelholm)

=== IF Elfsborg ===
In: Note: Flags indicate national team as defined under FIFA eligibility rules; some limited exceptions apply. Players may hold more than one non-FIFA nationality.

No.	Pos.	Nation	Player
—	DF	SWE	Jesper Arvidsson (loan return from Åtvidabergs FF)
—	FW	SWE	Joel Johansson (loan return from GAIS)
—	DF	SWE	Jesper Florén (loan return from GAIS)
—	GK	SWE	Abbas Hassan (loan return from IFK Norrköping)
—	FW	NGR	Mohammed Abdulrahman (from Motala AIF)
—	FW	SWE	David Elm (from Fulham F.C.) (Note: "David Elm klar för IF Elfsborg" (in Swedish). elfsborg.se. 2011-01-24.)
—	DF	SWE	Andreas Augustsson (from FC Horsens)
—	FW	SWE	Lasse Nilsson (from Vitesse Arnhem)

Out: Note: Flags indicate national team as defined under FIFA eligibility rules; some limited exceptions apply. Players may hold more than one non-FIFA nationality.

No.	Pos.	Nation	Player
—	DF	SWE	Teddy Lučić (retires)
—	DF	SWE	Marcus Falk-Olander (to IFK Norrköping)
—	DF	SWE	Mathias Florén (to IFK Norrköping)
—	FW	NGR	Mohammed Abdulrahman (on loan to GAIS)
—	FW	SWE	Denni Avdic (to Werder Bremen)
—	MF	SWE	Jesper Florén (on loan to GAIS)
—	GK	SWE	Joakim Wülff (to Östers IF)
—	FW	SWE	Fredrik Berglund (retires)
—	DF	SWE	Anders Wikström (on loan to IFK Norrköping)
—	DF	SWE	Jesper Arvidsson (to Åtvidabergs FF)
—	FW	LBR	Amadaiya Rennie (on loan to GAIS)

=== IFK Göteborg ===
In: Note: Flags indicate national team as defined under FIFA eligibility rules; some limited exceptions apply. Players may hold more than one non-FIFA nationality.

No.	Pos.	Nation	Player
—	FW	SWE	Andreas Drugge (from Trelleborgs FF)
—	DF	FIN	Tuomo Turunen (loan return from Trelleborgs FF)
—	DF	ISL	Hjörtur Logi Valgarðsson (from Fimleikafélag Hafnarfjarðar)

Out: Note: Flags indicate national team as defined under FIFA eligibility rules; some limited exceptions apply. Players may hold more than one non-FIFA nationality.

No.	Pos.	Nation	Player
—	FW	SWE	William Atashkadeh (to Örebro SK)
—	DF	SWE	Petter Björlund (free transfer)
—	DF	SWE	Nicklas Carlsson (to IF Brommapojkarna)
—	DF	FIN	Tuomo Turunen (to Trelleborgs FF)

=== IFK Norrköping ===
In: Note: Flags indicate national team as defined under FIFA eligibility rules; some limited exceptions apply. Players may hold more than one non-FIFA nationality.

No.	Pos.	Nation	Player
—	FW	SWE	Astrit Ajdarevic (from Örebro SK)
—	MF	SWE	Erik Jansson (loan return from IK Sleipner)
—	DF	SWE	Marcus Falk-Olander (from IF Elfsborg)
—	FW	EST	Joonas Tamm (from FC Flora Tallinn)
—	MF	SWE	Martin Smedberg-Dalence (from Ljungskile SK)
—	DF	SWE	Mathias Florén (from IF Elfsborg)
—	DF	SWE	Anders Wikström (on loan from IF Elfsborg)
—	DF	SWE	Bobbie Friberg Da Cruz (from Randers FC)
—	FW	ISL	Gunnar Heiðar Þorvaldsson (from IBV)

Out: Note: Flags indicate national team as defined under FIFA eligibility rules; some limited exceptions apply. Players may hold more than one non-FIFA nationality.

No.	Pos.	Nation	Player
—	MF	SWE	Mikael Lindskog (free transfer)
—	MF	SWE	Tobias Rickhammar (free transfer)
—	DF	SWE	Anders Whass (free transfer)
—	DF	SWE	Kristoffer Arvhage (free transfer)
—	MF	NOR	Eirik Dybendal (free transfer)
—	GK	SWE	Abbas Hassan (loan return to IF Elfsborg)
—	MF	BRA	Daniel Bamberg (to FK Haugesund)
—	GK	SWE	David Nilsson (loan to Sylvia)
—	FW	SWE	Andreas Haglund (loan to Sylvia)
—	DF	SWE	Enis Ahmetović (loan to Sylvia)
—	FW	SWE	Christoffer Nyman (loan to Sylvia)

=== Kalmar FF ===
In: Note: Flags indicate national team as defined under FIFA eligibility rules; some limited exceptions apply. Players may hold more than one non-FIFA nationality.

No.	Pos.	Nation	Player
—	DF	SWE	Petter Lennartsson (loan return from Jönköpings Södra)
—	DF	SWE	Markus Thorbjörnsson (loan return from Jönköpings Södra)
—	MF	ALB	Liridon Leci (KS Kastrioti)
—	DF	KOS	Alban Dragusha (KS Skenderbeu Korce)
—	FW	SWE	Besnik Rrustemaj (Blackburn)
—	MF	SWE	Kristoffer Fagercrantz (Jönköpings Södra IF)

Out: Note: Flags indicate national team as defined under FIFA eligibility rules; some limited exceptions apply. Players may hold more than one non-FIFA nationality.

No.	Pos.	Nation	Player
—	MF	SWE	Jimmie Augustsson (Assyriska FF)
—	DF	SWE	Petter Lennartsson (free transfer)
—	MF	SWE	Joakim Karlsson (Kristianstads FF)
—	FW	BRA	Douglas Vieira (free transfer)
—	DF	SWE	Marcus Lindberg (to Ängelholms FF)
—	DF	SWE	Joachim Lantz (free transfer)
—	MF	SWE	Robin Östlind (to Gunnilse IS)
—	DF	SWE	Stefan Ålander (to GIF Sundsvall)

=== Malmö FF ===
In: Note: Flags indicate national team as defined under FIFA eligibility rules; some limited exceptions apply. Players may hold more than one non-FIFA nationality.

No.	Pos.	Nation	Player

Out: Note: Flags indicate national team as defined under FIFA eligibility rules; some limited exceptions apply. Players may hold more than one non-FIFA nationality.

No.	Pos.	Nation	Player
—	DF	SWE	Anes Mravac (to LB07)
—	MF	SWE	Muamet Asanovski (free transfer)
—	DF	CMR	Joseph Elanga (free transfer)
—	MF	NED	Rick Kruys (on loan to FC Volendam)
—	GK	SWE	Dejan Garača (on loan to IF Limhamn Bunkeflo)
—	DF	SWE	Filip Stenström (loan to LB07)

=== Mjällby AIF ===
In: Note: Flags indicate national team as defined under FIFA eligibility rules; some limited exceptions apply. Players may hold more than one non-FIFA nationality.

No.	Pos.	Nation	Player
—	MF	CZE	Pavel Zavadil (from Örgryte IS)
—	FW	USA	Samuel Petrone (from New Jersey Rangers)

Out: Note: Flags indicate national team as defined under FIFA eligibility rules; some limited exceptions apply. Players may hold more than one non-FIFA nationality.

No.	Pos.	Nation	Player
—	MF	SWE	Christopher Alvengrip (loan to Västerås SK)
—	FW	RUS	Pyotr Gitselov (contract terminated)
—	MF	SWE	Emmanuel Svensson (loan to Falkenberg)

=== Syrianska FC ===
In: Note: Flags indicate national team as defined under FIFA eligibility rules; some limited exceptions apply. Players may hold more than one non-FIFA nationality.

No.	Pos.	Nation	Player
—	MF	SWE	Johan Arneng (from Aalesunds FK)
—	MF	SWE	Sharbel Touma (from Djurgårdens IF)
—	DF	BRA	Alex Perreira (from Örgryte IS)
—	DF	SWE	David Durmaz (from Ljungskile SK)
—	DF	SWE	Omar Jawo (from Gefle IF)
—	DF	SWE	Erkan Sağlık (from Kocaelispor)

Out: Note: Flags indicate national team as defined under FIFA eligibility rules; some limited exceptions apply. Players may hold more than one non-FIFA nationality.

No.	Pos.	Nation	Player
—	MF	SWE	Yussuf Saleh (loan return to AIK)
—	DF	BIH	Haris Skenderovic (to Stabæk) (Note: "Midtstopperen Haris Skenderovic har signert en treårskontrakt" (in Norwegian). stabak.no. 2010-11-18.)
—	MF	SWE	Denis Velić (free transfer)

=== Trelleborgs FF ===
In: Note: Flags indicate national team as defined under FIFA eligibility rules; some limited exceptions apply. Players may hold more than one non-FIFA nationality.

No.	Pos.	Nation	Player
—	DF	SWE	Erdin Demir (from LB07)
—	FW	SWE	Andreas Grahm (from VMA IK)
—	MF	BRA	Thiago Pinto Borges (from NK Mosor)
—	DF	FIN	Tuomo Turunen (from IFK Göteborg)

Out: Note: Flags indicate national team as defined under FIFA eligibility rules; some limited exceptions apply. Players may hold more than one non-FIFA nationality.

No.	Pos.	Nation	Player
—	FW	SWE	Andreas Drugge (to IFK Göteborg)
—	DF	FIN	Tuomo Turunen (loan return to IFK Göteborg)
—	DF	SWE	Max Fuxberg (to free transfer)
—	MF	NGR	Adeola Runsewe (to free transfer)

=== Örebro SK ===
In: Note: Flags indicate national team as defined under FIFA eligibility rules; some limited exceptions apply. Players may hold more than one non-FIFA nationality.

No.	Pos.	Nation	Player
—	MF	SWE	Emil Berger (from Degerfors IF)
—	FW	SWE	Robin Staaf (loan return from Ängelholms FF)
—	FW	SWE	William Atashkadeh (from IFK Göteborg)
—	FW	SWE	Kalle Holmberg (from Karlslunds IF)
—	FW	SWE	Miralem Malic (from Arboga Södra IF)
—	FW	SWE	Ahmed Yasin (from BK Forward)
—	MF	SWE	Josef Ibrahim (from BK Forward)
—	FW	SWE	Andreas Haddad (from Assyriska FF)
—	DF	SWE	Patrik Haginge (from Djurgårdens IF)
—	GK	SWE	Peter Rosendal (from FC Väsby United)
—	FW	KOS	Valdet Rama (from Hannover 96)

Out: Note: Flags indicate national team as defined under FIFA eligibility rules; some limited exceptions apply. Players may hold more than one non-FIFA nationality.

No.	Pos.	Nation	Player
—	MF	CMR	Henri Belle (loan return to Union Douala)
—	DF	CMR	Bertin Samuel Zé Ndille (free transfer)
—	FW	IRL	Anthony Flood (free transfer)
—	GK	SWE	Peter Westman (free transfer)
—	FW	SWE	Astrit Ajdarevic (to IFK Norrköping)
—	FW	BRA	Paulinho Guará (loan return to Busan I'Park)
—	MF	CMR	Eric Bassombeng (to GAIS)

== Superettan ==
=== Assyriska FF ===
In: Note: Flags indicate national team as defined under FIFA eligibility rules; some limited exceptions apply. Players may hold more than one non-FIFA nationality.

No.	Pos.	Nation	Player
—	MF	SWE	Jimmie Augustsson (from Kalmar FF)
—	MF	BRA	Elvis da Silva Santana (from FC Väsby United)
—	MF	SWE	David Yarar (from Syrianska FC)
—	GK	SWE	Oscar Berglund (on loan from Helsingborgs IF)
—	DF	SWE	Simon Ogunnaike (from Valsta Syrianska)
—	FW	SWE	Jones Kusi-Asare (from Esbjerg)

Out: Note: Flags indicate national team as defined under FIFA eligibility rules; some limited exceptions apply. Players may hold more than one non-FIFA nationality.

No.	Pos.	Nation	Player
—	DF	SWE	Pierre Bengtsson (free transfer)
—	DF	SWE	Gabriel Rhawi (free transfer)
—	GK	FIN	Magnus Bahne (FC Inter Turku)
—	MF	SWE	Marco Kotilainen (free transfer)
—	FW	KOS	Xhevdet Llumnica (LB07)
—	DF	SWE	David Björkeryd (free transfer)
—	DF	SWE	Mikael Eklund (to IK Brage)
—	FW	SWE	Andreas Haddad (to Örebro SK)
—	FW	SWE	Mattias Genc (to FC Väsby United)

=== Degerfors IF ===
In: Note: Flags indicate national team as defined under FIFA eligibility rules; some limited exceptions apply. Players may hold more than one non-FIFA nationality.

No.	Pos.	Nation	Player
—	MF	SWE	Christopher Brandeborn (from Skiljebo SK) (Note: "Christopher Brandeborn klar för Degerfors IF" (in Swedish). degerforsif.se. 2011-01-12.)
—	DF	SWE	Jonas Olsson (from Carlstad United BK) (Note: "Jonas Olsson: Det känns riktigt bra att äntligen komma hit" (in Swedish). degerforsif.se. 2011-01-05.)
—	FW	SWE	Alexander Andersson (from KB Karlskoga FF) (Note: "Alexander Andersson klar för Degerfors IF" (in Swedish). degerforsif.se. 2011-01-19.)

Out: Note: Flags indicate national team as defined under FIFA eligibility rules; some limited exceptions apply. Players may hold more than one non-FIFA nationality.

No.	Pos.	Nation	Player
—	MF	SWE	Emil Berger (to Örebro SK)
—	DF	SWE	Mikael Nilsson (retires)
—	FW	SWE	Sebastian Henriksson (retires)
—	GK	SWE	Sebastian Karlsson (retires)

=== Falkenbergs FF ===
In: Note: Flags indicate national team as defined under FIFA eligibility rules; some limited exceptions apply. Players may hold more than one non-FIFA nationality.

No.	Pos.	Nation	Player
—	FW	SWE	Marcus Mårtensson (from IFK Berga)
—	DF	SWE	Per Johansson (from Halmstads BK)
—	MF	SWE	Emmanuel Svensson (loan from Mjällby AIF)

Out: Note: Flags indicate national team as defined under FIFA eligibility rules; some limited exceptions apply. Players may hold more than one non-FIFA nationality.

No.	Pos.	Nation	Player
—	DF	SWE	Tibor Joza (to BK Häcken)
—	MF	SWE	Mohamed Yussuf (free transfer)
—	FW	SWE	Korab Gashi (free transfer)
—	MF	SWE	Peter Nilsson (to Qviding FIF)
—	FW	SWE	Daniel Alexandersson (retires)

=== GIF Sundsvall ===
In: Note: Flags indicate national team as defined under FIFA eligibility rules; some limited exceptions apply. Players may hold more than one non-FIFA nationality.

No.	Pos.	Nation	Player
—	FW	BRA	Denis Dos Santos (from KePs)
—	DF	FIN	Patrik Rikama (from IFK Mariehamn)
—	GK	SWE	Niklas Larsson (from Hudiksvalls ABK)
—	DF	SWE	Stefan Ålander (from Kalmar FF)
—	FW	SWE	Pontus Engblom (on loan from AIK)
—	MF	MEX	Alexis Mendiola (free transfer)

Out: Note: Flags indicate national team as defined under FIFA eligibility rules; some limited exceptions apply. Players may hold more than one non-FIFA nationality.

No.	Pos.	Nation	Player
—	DF	SWE	Billy Berntsson (to Kilmarnock)
—	FW	GAM	Aziz Corr Nyang (on loan to IF Brommapojkarna)

=== Hammarby IF ===
In: Note: Flags indicate national team as defined under FIFA eligibility rules; some limited exceptions apply. Players may hold more than one non-FIFA nationality.

No.	Pos.	Nation	Player
—	MF	SWE	Vlado Zlojutro (loan return from Ontinyent CF)
—	FW	SWE	Rojen Sürek (from Värmdö IF)
—	FW	BRA	Paulinho Guará (from Busan I'Park)
—	FW	SWE	Sinan Ayranci (from Genclerbirligi)
—	FW	SWE	Björn Runström (free transfer)

Out: Note: Flags indicate national team as defined under FIFA eligibility rules; some limited exceptions apply. Players may hold more than one non-FIFA nationality.

No.	Pos.	Nation	Player
—	FW	SWE	Linus Hallenius (to Genoa CFC) (Note: "Linus Hallenius klar för Genoa CFC" (in Swedish). hammarbyfotboll.se. 2010-09-01.)
—	MF	SWE	Fredrik Söderström (retires)
—	FW	SWE	Freddy Söderberg (free transfer)
—	DF	DEN	Christian Traoré (free transfer)
—	DF	SWE	Filip Bergman (free transfer)
—	MF	SWE	Vlado Zlojutro (free transfer)

=== IF Brommapojkarna ===
In: Note: Flags indicate national team as defined under FIFA eligibility rules; some limited exceptions apply. Players may hold more than one non-FIFA nationality.

No.	Pos.	Nation	Player
—	DF	SWE	Nicklas Carlsson (from IFK Göteborg)
—	FW	SWE	Saihou Jagne (from AIK)
—	FW	GAM	Aziz Corr Nyang (on loan from GIF Sundsvall)

Out: Note: Flags indicate national team as defined under FIFA eligibility rules; some limited exceptions apply. Players may hold more than one non-FIFA nationality.

No.	Pos.	Nation	Player
—	FW	SWE	Joakim Runnemo (free transfer)
—	DF	SWE	Kim Odelius (free transfer)
—	MF	SYR	Imad Chhadeh (free transfer)
—	FW	SWE	Sinan Ayranci (loan return to Gençlerbirliği S.K.)
—	GK	SWE	Benny Lekström (free transfer)
—	DF	SWE	Ted Fontér (free transfer)
—	FW	SWE	Olof Guterstam (free transfer)
—	DF	SWE	Pär Asp (to Gefle IF)
—	MF	DEN	Mikkel Jensen (free transfer)
—	DF	SWE	André Möllestam (free transfer)

=== IFK Värnamo ===
In: Note: Flags indicate national team as defined under FIFA eligibility rules; some limited exceptions apply. Players may hold more than one non-FIFA nationality.

No.	Pos.	Nation	Player
—	GK	SWE	Bill Halvorsen (from Åtvidabergs FF) (Note: "Målvakt på gång" (in Swedish). ifkvarnamo.se. 2011-01-24.)

Out: Note: Flags indicate national team as defined under FIFA eligibility rules; some limited exceptions apply. Players may hold more than one non-FIFA nationality.

No.	Pos.	Nation	Player
—	GK	SWE	Dennis Löf (to Ljungby IF) (Note: "Dennis Löf lämnar IFK" (in Swedish). ifkvarnamo.se. 2011-01-13.)
—	MF	SWE	Johan Gunnarsson (to free transfer) (Note: "Förändringar i A-truppen" (in Swedish). ifkvarnamo.se. 2011-01-16.)
—	DF	SWE	Luan Rizani (to free transfer)
—	FW	SWE	Enes Ahmetovic (to free transfer)
—	DF	SWE	Jonas Calan (to free transfer) (Note: "Justeringar i A-truppen" (in Swedish). ifkvarnamo.se. 2011-01-23.)

=== IK Brage ===
In: Note: Flags indicate national team as defined under FIFA eligibility rules; some limited exceptions apply. Players may hold more than one non-FIFA nationality.

No.	Pos.	Nation	Player
—	DF	SWE	Mikael Eklund (from Assyriska FF)
—	MF	SWE	Jesper Carlsson (from Väsby United)

Out: Note: Flags indicate national team as defined under FIFA eligibility rules; some limited exceptions apply. Players may hold more than one non-FIFA nationality.

No.	Pos.	Nation	Player
—	DF	SWE	Håkan Malmström (free transfer)
—	DF	SWE	Fredrik Jansson (free transfer)
—	MF	SWE	Nermin Sarhatlic (free transfer)

=== Jönköpings Södra IF ===
In: Note: Flags indicate national team as defined under FIFA eligibility rules; some limited exceptions apply. Players may hold more than one non-FIFA nationality.

No.	Pos.	Nation	Player

Out: Note: Flags indicate national team as defined under FIFA eligibility rules; some limited exceptions apply. Players may hold more than one non-FIFA nationality.

No.	Pos.	Nation	Player
—	DF	SWE	Petter Lennartsson (loan return to Kalmar FF)
—	DF	SWE	Markus Thorbjörnsson (loan return from Kalmar FF)

=== Landskrona BoIS ===
In: Note: Flags indicate national team as defined under FIFA eligibility rules; some limited exceptions apply. Players may hold more than one non-FIFA nationality.

No.	Pos.	Nation	Player
—	DF	SWE	Fredrik Liverstam (from Helsingborgs IF) (Note: "Klart med ny mittback" (in Swedish). landskronabois.com. 2010-11-11.)
—	MF	SWE	Marcus Lantz (free transfer) (Note: "Marcus Lantz skrev tvåårsavtal med BoIS" (in Swedish). landskronabois.com. 2011-01-26.)

Out: Note: Flags indicate national team as defined under FIFA eligibility rules; some limited exceptions apply. Players may hold more than one non-FIFA nationality.

No.	Pos.	Nation	Player
—	DF	SWE	Jens Nordström (free transfer)
—	FW	SWE	Calle Genberg (free transfer)
—	MF	SWE	Johan Persson (free transfer) (Note: "Johan Persson lämnar BoIS" (in Swedish). landskronabois.com. 2010-11-08.)

=== Ljungskile SK ===
In: Note: Flags indicate national team as defined under FIFA eligibility rules; some limited exceptions apply. Players may hold more than one non-FIFA nationality.

No.	Pos.	Nation	Player
—	MF	ESP	Lorenzo Brais (from Sevilla FC)
—	DF	SWE	Marcus Jarlegren (from BK Häcken)
—	MF	SWE	Dragan Bogdanovic (from Skoftebyns IF)
—	MF	SWE	Joakim Runnemo (free transfer)
—	MF	SWE	Alexander Mellqvist (to Ljungskile SK)
—	DF	SWE	Robin Jonsson (from Örgryte IS)
—	GK	SWE	Magnus Berglöf (from Torslanda IK)

Out: Note: Flags indicate national team as defined under FIFA eligibility rules; some limited exceptions apply. Players may hold more than one non-FIFA nationality.

No.	Pos.	Nation	Player
—	MF	SWE	Martin Smedberg-Dalence (to IFK Norrköping)
—	MF	SWE	Erik Nilsson (loan return to Örebro SK)
—	DF	SWE	David Durmaz (to Syrianska FC)
—	DF	SWE	Sören Frem (to IK Oddevold)
—	DF	FIN	Henrik Nikkilä (contract terminated)

=== Qviding FIF ===
Club raised from Division 1 following Örgryte IS relegation on February 16, 2011

In: Note: Flags indicate national team as defined under FIFA eligibility rules; some limited exceptions apply. Players may hold more than one non-FIFA nationality.

No.	Pos.	Nation	Player
—	MF	SWE	Mohammed Omeirat (to Gunnilse IS)
—	MF	SWE	Peter Nilsson (from Falkenbergs FF)
—	GK	SWE	Sebastian Frick (on loan from BK Häcken)
—	DF	SWE	Joel Gustafsson (from St. John's Red Storm)
—	MF	SWE	Sandeep Mankoo (loan from GAIS)

Out: Note: Flags indicate national team as defined under FIFA eligibility rules; some limited exceptions apply. Players may hold more than one non-FIFA nationality.

No.	Pos.	Nation	Player
—	GK	SWE	David Stenman (free transfer)
—	DF	SWE	Johan Björkeryd (free transfer)
—	DF	SWE	Eric Hammar (free transfer)
—	FW	SWE	Anton Holmberg (retires)

=== Västerås SK ===
In: Note: Flags indicate national team as defined under FIFA eligibility rules; some limited exceptions apply. Players may hold more than one non-FIFA nationality.

No.	Pos.	Nation	Player
—	FW	SWE	Mattias Mete (from Syrianska IF Kerburan)
—	FW	SWE	Daniel Andersson (from Östersunds FK)
—	DF	SWE	Per Pettersson (from Nyköpings BIS)
—	MF	SWE	Patrik St Cyr (from IK Sirius)
—	MF	SWE	Christopher Alvengrip (loan from Mjällby AIF)

Out: Note: Flags indicate national team as defined under FIFA eligibility rules; some limited exceptions apply. Players may hold more than one non-FIFA nationality.

No.	Pos.	Nation	Player
—	DF	SWE	Oliwer Malmkvist (to Västerås IK Fotboll)
—	FW	SWE	Patrik Östlund (to Västerås IK Fotboll)
—	MF	SWE	Philip Fredriksson (to Västerås IK Fotboll)

=== Åtvidabergs FF ===
In: Note: Flags indicate national team as defined under FIFA eligibility rules; some limited exceptions apply. Players may hold more than one non-FIFA nationality.

No.	Pos.	Nation	Player
—	FW	SWE	Magnus Eriksson (from FC Väsby United)
—	DF	SWE	Jesper Arvidsson (from IF Elfsborg)

Out: Note: Flags indicate national team as defined under FIFA eligibility rules; some limited exceptions apply. Players may hold more than one non-FIFA nationality.

No.	Pos.	Nation	Player
—	DF	SWE	Jesper Arvidsson (loan return to IF Elfsborg)
—	FW	SWE	Dejan Doslic (free transfer)
—	GK	SWE	Bill Halvorsen (to IFK Värnamo) (Note: "Målvakt på gång" (in Swedish). ifkvarnamo.se. 2011-01-24.)

=== Ängelholms FF ===
In: Note: Flags indicate national team as defined under FIFA eligibility rules; some limited exceptions apply. Players may hold more than one non-FIFA nationality.

No.	Pos.	Nation	Player
—	DF	SWE	Marcus Lindberg (from Kalmar FF)
—	MF	SWE	Samuel Aziz (loan from Helsingborg)
—	FW	SWE	Mohamed Ramadan (loan from Helsingborg)

Out: Note: Flags indicate national team as defined under FIFA eligibility rules; some limited exceptions apply. Players may hold more than one non-FIFA nationality.

No.	Pos.	Nation	Player
—	MF	SWE	Johan Mangfors (free transfer)
—	DF	SWE	Pehr Andersson (loan return to Halmstads BK)
—	GK	SWE	Daniel Andersson (to Helsingborgs IF) (Note: "Daniel Andersson återvänder till HIF" (in Swedish). hif.se. 2011-03-02.)

=== Örgryte IS ===
Forced relegated to Division 1 Södra on February 16, 2011, transfers below were done while the club was still part of Superettan

In: Note: Flags indicate national team as defined under FIFA eligibility rules; some limited exceptions apply. Players may hold more than one non-FIFA nationality.

No.	Pos.	Nation	Player

Out: Note: Flags indicate national team as defined under FIFA eligibility rules; some limited exceptions apply. Players may hold more than one non-FIFA nationality.

No.	Pos.	Nation	Player
—	DF	SWE	Björn Åkesson (free transfer)
—	MF	CZE	Pavel Zavadil (to Mjällby AIF)
—	DF	BRA	Alex Perreira (to Syrianska FC)
—	MF	SWE	Björn Anklev (to BK Häcken)
—	FW	BRA	Álvaro Santos (on loan to GAIS)
—	MF	SWE	Alexander Mellqvist (to Ljungskile SK)

=== Östers IF ===
In: Note: Flags indicate national team as defined under FIFA eligibility rules; some limited exceptions apply. Players may hold more than one non-FIFA nationality.

No.	Pos.	Nation	Player
—	MF	SWE	Denis Velic (from Syrianska FC)
—	GK	SWE	Joakim Wülff (from IF Elfsborg)
—	FW	SWE	Freddy Söderberg (from Hammarby IF)

Out: Note: Flags indicate national team as defined under FIFA eligibility rules; some limited exceptions apply. Players may hold more than one non-FIFA nationality.

No.	Pos.	Nation	Player
—	GK	SWE	Björn Åkesson (to Värnamo Södra)
—	MF	RSA	Jabu Mahlangu (free transfer)
—	DF	SWE	Fredrik Bild (retires)
—	FW	SWE	Axel Johansson (to Skiljebo SK)
—	MF	SWE	Enes Smajlovic (free transfer)
—	MF	SWE	Danny Tadaris (free transfer)
—	FW	RWA	Olivier Karekezi (free transfer)
