= List of Swedish football transfers winter 2007–08 =

This is a list of transfers from and to the clubs in the Swedish top football league Allsvenskan. It contains all the players that have joined or left the clubs from the end of the 2007 season in October 2007 until the start of the 2008 season in April 2008.

== AIK ==
In

Note: Flags indicate national team as defined under FIFA eligibility rules; some limited exceptions apply. Players may hold more than one non-FIFA nationality.

No.	Pos.	Nation	Player
—	DF	SWE	Walid Atta (from FC Väsby United)
—	FW	SWE	Saihou Jagne (from FC Väsby United)
—	MF	SWE	Bojan Djordjic (from Plymouth Argyle F.C.)
—	MF	URU	Jorge Anchén (from CA Bella Vista)

Out

Note: Flags indicate national team as defined under FIFA eligibility rules; some limited exceptions apply. Players may hold more than one non-FIFA nationality.

No.	Pos.	Nation	Player
—	DF	SWE	Jimmy Tamandi (to FC Lyn Oslo)
—	FW	NOR	Bernt Hulsker (to IK Start)
—	DF	SWE	Nicklas Carlsson (to IFK Göteborg)
—	DF	NOR	Per Verner Vågan Rønning (to FK Bodø/Glimt)
—	MF	ARG	Pablo Monsalvo (to club unknown)

== Djurgårdens IF ==
In

Note: Flags indicate national team as defined under FIFA eligibility rules; some limited exceptions apply. Players may hold more than one non-FIFA nationality.

No.	Pos.	Nation	Player
—	MF	SWE	Martin Andersson (from Enköpings SK)
—	FW	SWE	Sebastian Rajalakso (from Enköpings SK)
—	GK	SWE	Tommi Vaiho (from Värtans IK)
—	MF	SWE	Per Johansson (from BK Forward)

Out

Note: Flags indicate national team as defined under FIFA eligibility rules; some limited exceptions apply. Players may hold more than one non-FIFA nationality.

No.	Pos.	Nation	Player
—	MF	SUI	Felix Magro (to IFK Norrköping)
—	DF	SWE	Eldin Kozica (to club unknown)
—	MF	SWE	Johan Arneng (to Aalesunds FK)
—	MF	SWE	Patrick Amoah (to CA Ciudad de Lorquí)
—	DF	SWE	Dennis Boskailo (to Falkenbergs FF)
—	MF	SWE	Christoffer Karlsson (to Åtvidabergs FF)

== IF Elfsborg ==
In

Note: Flags indicate national team as defined under FIFA eligibility rules; some limited exceptions apply. Players may hold more than one non-FIFA nationality.

No.	Pos.	Nation	Player
—	MF	ISL	Helgi Valur Danielson (from Östers IF)
—	DF	SWE	Teddy Lučić (from BK Häcken)
—	FW	SWE	Joakim Sjöhage (from SK Brann)

Out

Note: Flags indicate national team as defined under FIFA eligibility rules; some limited exceptions apply. Players may hold more than one non-FIFA nationality.

No.	Pos.	Nation	Player
—	MF	SWE	Daniel Alexandersson (to IFK Göteborg)
—	DF	SWE	Fredrik Björck (to Esbjerg fB)

== GAIS ==
In

Note: Flags indicate national team as defined under FIFA eligibility rules; some limited exceptions apply. Players may hold more than one non-FIFA nationality.

No.	Pos.	Nation	Player
—	MF	SWE	Tommy Lycén (from IF Brommapojkarna)
—	DF	SWE	Björn Andersson (from Qviding FIF)
—	FW	BRA	Daniel Morais Reis (from FC América)
—	MF	FIN	Markus Halsti (from HJK)
—	MF	ARM	Levon Pachajyan (from FC Pyunik)

Out

Note: Flags indicate national team as defined under FIFA eligibility rules; some limited exceptions apply. Players may hold more than one non-FIFA nationality.

No.	Pos.	Nation	Player
—	FW	SWE	Tobias Holmqvist (to Helsingborgs IF)
—	DF	SWE	Mattias Östberg (to BK Häcken)
—	FW	SWE	Anton Holmberg (to Örgryte IS)
—	MF	SWE	Martin Dohlsten (to Örgryte IS)
—	FW	AZE	Anatoli Ponomarev (to FC Baku)

== Gefle IF ==
In

Note: Flags indicate national team as defined under FIFA eligibility rules; some limited exceptions apply. Players may hold more than one non-FIFA nationality.

No.	Pos.	Nation	Player
—	MF	GHA	Yussif Chibsah (from Hapoel Nazareth Illit F.C.)
—	FW	SWE	Hans Berggren (from BK Häcken)
—	FW	SWE	Amadou Yawo (from Vallentuna BK)

Out

Note: Flags indicate national team as defined under FIFA eligibility rules; some limited exceptions apply. Players may hold more than one non-FIFA nationality.

No.	Pos.	Nation	Player
—	FW	SWE	Daniel Ytterbom (to Sjötulls BK)
—	FW	SWE	Joel Stillmark (to Hudiksvalls ABK)
—	MF	SWE	Petter Österberg (to IK Sirius)

== IFK Göteborg ==
In

Note: Flags indicate national team as defined under FIFA eligibility rules; some limited exceptions apply. Players may hold more than one non-FIFA nationality.

No.	Pos.	Nation	Player
—	DF	SWE	Nicklas Carlsson (from AIK)
—	MF	SWE	Daniel Alexandersson (from IF Elfsborg)
—	MF	SWE	Jonatan Berg (from Trelleborgs FF)

Out

Note: Flags indicate national team as defined under FIFA eligibility rules; some limited exceptions apply. Players may hold more than one non-FIFA nationality.

No.	Pos.	Nation	Player
—	GK	SWE	Bengt Andersson (ends his career)
—	DF	SWE	Magnus Johansson (to Särö IK)
—	MF	SWE	Bastian Rojas Diaz (to club unknown)
—	GK	SWE	Alexander Nadj (to Jönköpings Södra IF)
—	MF	SWE	Andres Vasquez (to FC Zürich)
—	FW	SWE	George Mourad (to Willem II)
—	FW	CAN	Ali Gerba (to FC Ingolstadt 04)

== Halmstads BK ==
In

Note: Flags indicate national team as defined under FIFA eligibility rules; some limited exceptions apply. Players may hold more than one non-FIFA nationality.

No.	Pos.	Nation	Player
—	MF	SWE	Marcus Olsson (from Högaborgs BK)
—	DF	SWE	Markus Gustafson (from BK Forward)
—	MF	NED	Alexander Prent (from NEC)
—	FW	SWE	Emir Kujovic (from Falkenbergs FF)
—	GK	SWE	Marcus Sahlman (from Trelleborgs FF)

Out

Note: Flags indicate national team as defined under FIFA eligibility rules; some limited exceptions apply. Players may hold more than one non-FIFA nationality.

No.	Pos.	Nation	Player
—	MF	SWE	Hasse Mattisson (to Dalby FF)
—	MF	SWE	Björn Anklev (to Örgryte IS)
—	DF	SWE	Tibor Joza (to Falkenbergs FF)
—	GK	KAZ	David Loria (to club unknown)
—	MF	SWE	Dusan Djuric (to FC Zürich)

== Hammarby IF ==
In

Note: Flags indicate national team as defined under FIFA eligibility rules; some limited exceptions apply. Players may hold more than one non-FIFA nationality.

No.	Pos.	Nation	Player
—	FW	SWE	Freddy Söderberg (from IFK Värnamo)
—	GK	SWE	Kristoffer Björklund (from IF Brommapojkarna)
—	MF	URU	Claudio Dadomo (from Montevideo Wanderers)
—	GK	SWE	Rami Shaaban (from Fredrikstad FK)

Out

Note: Flags indicate national team as defined under FIFA eligibility rules; some limited exceptions apply. Players may hold more than one non-FIFA nationality.

No.	Pos.	Nation	Player
—	DF	ISL	Gunnar Thor Gunnarsson (to IFK Norrköping)
—	FW	ISL	Heidar Geir Juliusson (to club unknown)
—	GK	SWE	Benny Lekström (to IF Brommapojkarna)
—	DF	SWE	Joakim Jensen (to Qviding FIF)
—	FW	RSA	Toni Nhleko (to club unknown)
—	MF	URU	Sebastián Eguren (to Villarreal CF)

== Helsingborgs IF ==
In

Note: Flags indicate national team as defined under FIFA eligibility rules; some limited exceptions apply. Players may hold more than one non-FIFA nationality.

No.	Pos.	Nation	Player
—	FW	UGA	Mike SSerumaga (from Police FC)
—	FW	SWE	Tobias Holmqvist (from GAIS)

Out

Note: Flags indicate national team as defined under FIFA eligibility rules; some limited exceptions apply. Players may hold more than one non-FIFA nationality.

No.	Pos.	Nation	Player
—	MF	SWE	Andreas Dahl (to FC Nordsjælland)
—	DF	SWE	Andreas Jakobsson (to Svalövs BK)
—	MF	SWE	Imad Khalili (to IFK Norrköping)
—	FW	RWA	Olivier Karekezi (to Ham-Kam)
—	FW	EST	Tarmo Neemelo (to MyPa)
—	FW	SWE	Gustaf Andersson (ends his career)

== Kalmar FF ==
In

Note: Flags indicate national team as defined under FIFA eligibility rules; some limited exceptions apply. Players may hold more than one non-FIFA nationality.

No.	Pos.	Nation	Player
—	DF	SWE	Marcus Lindberg (from Mjällby AIF)
—	MF	SWE	Jimmie Augustsson (from Trelleborgs FF)
—	FW	NGR	Abiola Dauda (from Sölvesborgs GoIF)
—	FW	BRA	Marcel Sacramento (from Ceará FC)
—	MF	BRA	Daniel Lopes Silva (to Fortaleza EC)

Out

Note: Flags indicate national team as defined under FIFA eligibility rules; some limited exceptions apply. Players may hold more than one non-FIFA nationality.

No.	Pos.	Nation	Player
—	FW	BRA	Givaldo Oliveira (to club unknown)
—	FW	BRA	Tiago Oliveira (to club unknown)
—	FW	BRA	Ricardo Santos (to Åtvidabergs FF)
—	DF	SWE	Henrik Nilsson (to Östers IF)
—	MF	SWE	Fredrik Pettersson (to Östers IF)
—	GK	SWE	Carl Sahlén (to Karlskrona AIF)

== Ljungskile SK ==
In

Note: Flags indicate national team as defined under FIFA eligibility rules; some limited exceptions apply. Players may hold more than one non-FIFA nationality.

No.	Pos.	Nation	Player
—	MF	SWE	Niklas Lövgren (from Skärhams IK)
—	MF	SWE	Daniel Åkervall (from IF Sylvia)
—	GK	POL	Michal Slawuta (from FC Lahti)
—	FW	SWE	Jon Lundblad (from Örebro SK)
—	GK	USA	Colin Burns (from Kokkolan Palloveikot)
—	DF	SWE	Marcus Senften (from Kristianstads FF)
—	FW	CMR	Etchu Tabe (from Georgia State University)
—	DF	CRO	Damir Vitas (from NK Medimurje)

Out

Note: Flags indicate national team as defined under FIFA eligibility rules; some limited exceptions apply. Players may hold more than one non-FIFA nationality.

No.	Pos.	Nation	Player
—	MF	SWE	Per Eriksson (to FC Trollhättan)
—	MF	SWE	Daniel Berg (to IK Oddevold)
—	DF	SWE	Elvis Kharimanovic (to club unknown)
—	MF	SRB	Goran Marinkovic (to club FK Zlatibor Voda)
—	GK	SWE	Niclas Svensson (to club unknown)
—	DF	SWE	Darko Matijevic (to FC Trollhättan)
—	FW	SWE	Mathias Gravem (to Qviding FIF)
—	DF	SWE	Jon Stockhaus (to Qviding FIF)
—	DF	SWE	Mattias Bulun (to Qviding FIF)

== Malmö FF ==
In

Note: Flags indicate national team as defined under FIFA eligibility rules; some limited exceptions apply. Players may hold more than one non-FIFA nationality.

No.	Pos.	Nation	Player
—	FW	SWE	Jiloan Hamad (from BK Forward)
—	GK	SWE	Dejan Garaca (from BK Forward)
—	MF	SWE	Jeffrey Aubynn (from Aalesunds FK)
—	DF	SWE	Daniel Theorin (from Landskrona BoIS)
—	MF	SWE	Daniel Sliper (from Bunkeflo IF)

Out

Note: Flags indicate national team as defined under FIFA eligibility rules; some limited exceptions apply. Players may hold more than one non-FIFA nationality.

No.	Pos.	Nation	Player
—	GK	SWE	Håkan Svensson (ends his career)
—	FW	BRA	José Junior (to FC Copenhagen)
—	MF	SWE	Yksel Osmanovski (to club unknown)
—	FW	SLE	Samuel Barlay (to IFK Mariehamn)

== IFK Norrköping ==
In

Note: Flags indicate national team as defined under FIFA eligibility rules; some limited exceptions apply. Players may hold more than one non-FIFA nationality.

No.	Pos.	Nation	Player
—	DF	ISL	Gunnar Thor Gunnarsson (from Hammarby IF)
—	MF	SUI	Felix Magro (from Djurgårdens IF)
—	MF	SWE	Imad Khalili (from Helsingborgs IF)
—	FW	NGR	Kevin Amuneke (from PFC CSKA Sofia)
—	DF	SWE	Armando Ibrakovic (from IF Sylvia)

Out

Note: Flags indicate national team as defined under FIFA eligibility rules; some limited exceptions apply. Players may hold more than one non-FIFA nationality.

No.	Pos.	Nation	Player
—	FW	ISL	Stefan Thordarson (ends his career)
—	MF	SWE	Patrik Svensson (to Bunkeflo IF)
—	FW	BRA	Bruno Santos (to Figueirense Futebol Clube)
—	MF	SWE	Martin Gustafsson (to IF Sylvia)
—	MF	SWE	Linus Hellman (to IF Sylvia)

== GIF Sundsvall ==
In

Note: Flags indicate national team as defined under FIFA eligibility rules; some limited exceptions apply. Players may hold more than one non-FIFA nationality.

No.	Pos.	Nation	Player
—	MF	ISL	Ari Freyr Skulason (from BK Häcken)
—	MF	SWE	Anton Andersson (from IFK Luleå)
—	DF	SWE	Billy Berntsson (from Falkenbergs FF)
—	MF	KEN	Robert Mambo Mumba (from BK Häcken)
—	MF	MKD	Nuri Mustafi (from FC Pori)
—	DF	ISL	Sverrir Garðarsson (from Hafnarfjörður)

Out

Note: Flags indicate national team as defined under FIFA eligibility rules; some limited exceptions apply. Players may hold more than one non-FIFA nationality.

No.	Pos.	Nation	Player
—	FW	EST	Tarmo Neemelo (to MyPa)
—	DF	SWE	Patrik Eriksson-Ohlsson (ends his career)

== Trelleborgs FF ==
In

Note: Flags indicate national team as defined under FIFA eligibility rules; some limited exceptions apply. Players may hold more than one non-FIFA nationality.

No.	Pos.	Nation	Player
—	DF	SWE	Max Fuxberg (from Bunkeflo IF)
—	MF	SWE	Rasmus Östman (from BK Forward)
—	GK	SWE	Johan Dahlin (from FC Lyn Oslo)
—	FW	SWE	Andreas Drugge (from Degerfors IF)
—	MF	BRA	Paulino Lopes Tavares (from Paris Villimomble)
—	DF	SWE	Mattias Nylund (from Aalesunds FK)

Out

Note: Flags indicate national team as defined under FIFA eligibility rules; some limited exceptions apply. Players may hold more than one non-FIFA nationality.

No.	Pos.	Nation	Player
—	GK	SWE	Marcus Sahlman (to Halmstads BK)
—	GK	SWE	Christian Fegler (to Kristianstads FF)
—	DF	SWE	Christian Ahlström (to club unknown)
—	DF	SWE	Linus Malmqvist (to Landskrona BoIS)
—	MF	SWE	Jimmie Augustsson (to Kalmar FF)
—	MF	SWE	Jonatan Berg (to IFK Göteborg)

== Örebro SK ==
In

Note: Flags indicate national team as defined under FIFA eligibility rules; some limited exceptions apply. Players may hold more than one non-FIFA nationality.

No.	Pos.	Nation	Player
—	FW	SWE	Michael Jidsjö (from Karlslunds FF HFK)
—	MF	CMR	Eric Magloire Bassonbeng (from Les Astres FC)
—	DF	CMR	Bertin Samuel Zé Ndille (from Canon Yaoundé)
—	MF	SWE	Magnus Kihlberg (from Aalesunds FK)
—	MF	SWE	Samuel Wowoah (from EN Paralimni)
—	FW	FIN	Roni Porokara (from FC Honka)
—	DF	SWE	Oskar Johansson (from Karlslunds FF HFK)
—	GK	SWE	Peter Rosendahl (from Bullermyrens IK)

Out

Note: Flags indicate national team as defined under FIFA eligibility rules; some limited exceptions apply. Players may hold more than one non-FIFA nationality.

No.	Pos.	Nation	Player
—	MF	DEN	Lars Larsen (ends his career)
—	DF	SWE	Magnus Samuelsson (to Degerfors IF)
—	DF	SWE	Fredrik Jansson (to club unknown)
—	FW	CRO	Anton Dedaj (to club unknown)
—	FW	SWE	Fredrik Samuelsson (to Ljungskile SK)
—	DF	SWE	Fredrik Samuelsson (to Assyriska FF)
—	DF	SWE	Joel Riddez (to Strømsgodset IF)
—	MF	SWE	Abgar Barsom (to Fredrikstad FK)
