= List of Swedish football transfers summer 2010 =

This is a list of Swedish football transfers in the summer transfer window 2010 by club.

Only transfers in and out between 1 July-31 July 2010 of the Allsvenskan and Superettan are included.

== Allsvenskan ==
=== AIK ===
In: Note: Flags indicate national team as defined under FIFA eligibility rules; some limited exceptions apply. Players may hold more than one non-FIFA nationality.

No.	Pos.	Nation	Player
—	GK	CRO	Ivan Turina (free transfer)
—	FW	CRO	Goran Ljubojević (from NK Zagreb)
—	FW	SWE	Admir Catovic (from FC Väsby United)
—	MF	ISL	Helgi Daníelsson (from F.C. Hansa Rostock)
—	MF	SWE	Robert Åhman-Persson (from Malmö FF)
—	FW	SLE	Mohamed Bangura (from IFK Värnamo)
—	MF	SWE	Niklas Maripuu (from FC Väsby United)

Out: Note: Flags indicate national team as defined under FIFA eligibility rules; some limited exceptions apply. Players may hold more than one non-FIFA nationality.

No.	Pos.	Nation	Player
—	MF	URU	Sebastián Eguren (to Villarreal CF)
—	FW	SLO	Miran Burgic (free transfer)
—	FW	BRA	Clecio (loan return to Morrinhos FC)
—	MF	ARG	Jorge Ortiz (contract terminated)
—	MF	SWE	Bojan Djordjic (to Videoton FC)
—	MF	SWE	Martin Mutumba (to Videoton FC)
—	MF	SWE	Kevin Walker (on loan to Assyriska FF)

=== BK Häcken ===
In: Note: Flags indicate national team as defined under FIFA eligibility rules; some limited exceptions apply. Players may hold more than one non-FIFA nationality.

No.	Pos.	Nation	Player
—	MF	COD	René Makondele (from Helsingborgs IF)

Out: Note: Flags indicate national team as defined under FIFA eligibility rules; some limited exceptions apply. Players may hold more than one non-FIFA nationality.

No.	Pos.	Nation	Player
—	FW	BRA	Kayke (loan return to CR Flamengo)

=== Djurgårdens IF ===
In: Note: Flags indicate national team as defined under FIFA eligibility rules; some limited exceptions apply. Players may hold more than one non-FIFA nationality.

No.	Pos.	Nation	Player
—	DF	SWE	Daniel Jarl (from Enköpings SK)
—	DF	ARG	Lucho (from FC Sheriff Tiraspol)

Out: Note: Flags indicate national team as defined under FIFA eligibility rules; some limited exceptions apply. Players may hold more than one non-FIFA nationality.

No.	Pos.	Nation	Player
—	DF	SWE	Adam Outinen (from IK Sirius)

=== GAIS ===
In: Note: Flags indicate national team as defined under FIFA eligibility rules; some limited exceptions apply. Players may hold more than one non-FIFA nationality.

No.	Pos.	Nation	Player
—	MF	SWE	Jonas Lindberg (from Skövde AIK)
—	DF	SWE	Jesper Florén (on loan from IF Elfsborg) (Note: "Jesper hoppas på speltid i GAIS för att utvecklas" (in Swedish). elfsborg.se. 2010-07-16.)
—	DF	SWE	Jimmy Tamandi (from FK Lyn)

Out: Note: Flags indicate national team as defined under FIFA eligibility rules; some limited exceptions apply. Players may hold more than one non-FIFA nationality.

No.	Pos.	Nation	Player
—	MF	BRA	Wanderson do Carmo (to Al-Ahli)
—	MF	ENG	Kyle Patterson (contract terminated)

=== Gefle IF ===
In: Note: Flags indicate national team as defined under FIFA eligibility rules; some limited exceptions apply. Players may hold more than one non-FIFA nationality.

No.	Pos.	Nation	Player
—	FW	BIH	Dragan Kapcevic (from Sollefteå GIF)

Out: Note: Flags indicate national team as defined under FIFA eligibility rules; some limited exceptions apply. Players may hold more than one non-FIFA nationality.

No.	Pos.	Nation	Player
—	MF	TAN	Haruna Moshi (contract terminated)
—	FW	SWE	Alexander Gerndt (to Helsingborgs IF)
—	MF	SWE	Jonatan Berg (to Taranto)

=== Halmstads BK ===
In: Note: Flags indicate national team as defined under FIFA eligibility rules; some limited exceptions apply. Players may hold more than one non-FIFA nationality.

No.	Pos.	Nation	Player
—	FW	SWE	Guri Baqaj (on loan from AlbinoLeffe)

Out: Note: Flags indicate national team as defined under FIFA eligibility rules; some limited exceptions apply. Players may hold more than one non-FIFA nationality.

No.	Pos.	Nation	Player
—	MF	USA	Michael Thomas (free transfer)
—	DF	SWE	Pehr Andersson (on loan to Ängelholms FF)

=== Helsingborgs IF ===
In: Note: Flags indicate national team as defined under FIFA eligibility rules; some limited exceptions apply. Players may hold more than one non-FIFA nationality.

No.	Pos.	Nation	Player
—	FW	SWE	Alexander Gerndt (from Gefle IF)
—	FW	SWE	Mohamed Ramadan (from Kvarnby IK)
—	FW	NED	Rachid Bouaouzan (free transfer)

Out: Note: Flags indicate national team as defined under FIFA eligibility rules; some limited exceptions apply. Players may hold more than one non-FIFA nationality.

No.	Pos.	Nation	Player
—	MF	SWE	Sebastian Carlsén (to Internazionale)
—	MF	SWE	Marcus Bergholtz (on loan to Ängelholms FF)
—	MF	COD	René Makondele (to BK Häcken)
—	FW	NED	Rachid Bouaouzan (loan return to Wigan Athletic F.C.)

=== IF Brommapojkarna ===
In: Note: Flags indicate national team as defined under FIFA eligibility rules; some limited exceptions apply. Players may hold more than one non-FIFA nationality.

No.	Pos.	Nation	Player
—	FW	SWE	Sinan Ayranci (on loan from Gençlerbirliği S.K.)

Out: Note: Flags indicate national team as defined under FIFA eligibility rules; some limited exceptions apply. Players may hold more than one non-FIFA nationality.

No.	Pos.	Nation	Player
—	FW	SWE	John Guidetti (loan return to Manchester City F.C.)
—	FW	SWE	Nabil Bahoui (on loan to FC Väsby United)

=== IF Elfsborg ===
In: Note: Flags indicate national team as defined under FIFA eligibility rules; some limited exceptions apply. Players may hold more than one non-FIFA nationality.

No.	Pos.	Nation	Player
—	DF	SWE	Jon Jönsson (from Brøndby IF) (Note: "Guldmakare Jönsson tillbaka i IF Elfsborg" (in Swedish). elfsborg.se. 2010-06-18.)
—	MF	SWE	Andreas Klarström (from Esbjerg fB) (Note: "Klarström är tillbaka: "Starkare än någonsin"" (in Swedish). elfsborg.se. 2010-07-01.)
—	GK	DEN	Jesper Christiansen (from F.C. Copenhagen) (Note: "Dansk landslagsmålvakt klar för IF Elfsborg" (in Swedish). elfsborg.se. 2010-07-02.)

Out: Note: Flags indicate national team as defined under FIFA eligibility rules; some limited exceptions apply. Players may hold more than one non-FIFA nationality.

No.	Pos.	Nation	Player
—	MF	SWE	Emir Bajrami (to FC Twente) (Note: "Holländska Twente får njuta av artisten Bajrami" (in Swedish). elfsborg.se. 2010-05-25.)
—	GK	SWE	Abbas Hassan (on loan to IFK Norrköping)
—	DF	SWE	Jesper Florén (on loan to GAIS)

=== IFK Göteborg ===
In: Note: Flags indicate national team as defined under FIFA eligibility rules; some limited exceptions apply. Players may hold more than one non-FIFA nationality.

No.	Pos.	Nation	Player
—	GK	SWE	David Asmar (from Västra Frölunda IF)

Out: Note: Flags indicate national team as defined under FIFA eligibility rules; some limited exceptions apply. Players may hold more than one non-FIFA nationality.

No.	Pos.	Nation	Player
—	DF	SWE	Fredrik Risp (free transfer)
—	GK	DEN	Kim Christensen (to F.C. Copenhagen)
—	DF	FIN	Tuomo Turunen (on loan to Trelleborgs FF)
—	MF	SWE	Gustav Svensson (to Bursaspor)

=== Kalmar FF ===
In: Note: Flags indicate national team as defined under FIFA eligibility rules; some limited exceptions apply. Players may hold more than one non-FIFA nationality.

No.	Pos.	Nation	Player
—	MF	SWE	Johan Bertilsson (from Degerfors IF)
—	FW	BRA	Douglas Vieira (from Santo Angelo)

Out: Note: Flags indicate national team as defined under FIFA eligibility rules; some limited exceptions apply. Players may hold more than one non-FIFA nationality.

No.	Pos.	Nation	Player
—	FW	BRA	Jael Ferreira (contract terminated)
—	MF	USA	Johann Smith (contract terminated)
—	DF	SWE	Markus Thorbjörnsson (on loan to Jönköpings Södra IF)
—	MF	NIR	Daryl Smylie (on loan to Jönköpings Södra)

=== Malmö FF ===
In: Note: Flags indicate national team as defined under FIFA eligibility rules; some limited exceptions apply. Players may hold more than one non-FIFA nationality.

No.	Pos.	Nation	Player
—	DF	POR	Yago Fernández (free transfer)

Out: Note: Flags indicate national team as defined under FIFA eligibility rules; some limited exceptions apply. Players may hold more than one non-FIFA nationality.

No.	Pos.	Nation	Player
—	MF	SWE	Robin Nilsson (to Ängelholms FF)
—	MF	SWE	Robert Åhman-Persson (to AIK)

=== Trelleborgs FF ===
In: Note: Flags indicate national team as defined under FIFA eligibility rules; some limited exceptions apply. Players may hold more than one non-FIFA nationality.

No.	Pos.	Nation	Player
—	DF	SLE	Ibrahim Koroma (from Motala AIF)
—	DF	FIN	Tuomo Turunen (on loan from IFK Göteborg)
—	MF	SWE	Rasmus Östman (loan return from IK Brage)

Out: Note: Flags indicate national team as defined under FIFA eligibility rules; some limited exceptions apply. Players may hold more than one non-FIFA nationality.

No.	Pos.	Nation	Player
—	DF	SWE	Mattias Nylund (to GIF Sundsvall)
—	DF	SWE	Philip Milenkovic (to Lunds BK)

=== Åtvidabergs FF ===
In: Note: Flags indicate national team as defined under FIFA eligibility rules; some limited exceptions apply. Players may hold more than one non-FIFA nationality.

No.	Pos.	Nation	Player
—	FW	NOR	Glenn Roberts (on loan from Aalesunds FK)
—	DF	NOR	Steinar Strømnes (free transfer)

Out: Note: Flags indicate national team as defined under FIFA eligibility rules; some limited exceptions apply. Players may hold more than one non-FIFA nationality.

No.	Pos.	Nation	Player

=== Örebro SK ===
In: Note: Flags indicate national team as defined under FIFA eligibility rules; some limited exceptions apply. Players may hold more than one non-FIFA nationality.

No.	Pos.	Nation	Player
—	GK	SWE	Simon Nurme (from Syrianska FC)
—	MF	SWE	Astrit Ajdarevic (free transfer)
—	MF	SWE	Per Johansson (loan return from BK Forward)
—	MF	SWE	Erik Nilsson (loan return from Ljungskile SK) (Note: "LSK lånar Erik Nilsson från Örebro" (in Swedish). lsk.se. 2010-05-23.)
—	MF	CMR	Henri Belle (on loan from Union Douala)
—	FW	IRL	Anthony Flood (from Galway United)
—	MF	FIN	Denis Abdulahi (from FC Viikingit)

Out: Note: Flags indicate national team as defined under FIFA eligibility rules; some limited exceptions apply. Players may hold more than one non-FIFA nationality.

No.	Pos.	Nation	Player
—	MF	SWE	Erik Nilsson (on loan to Ljungskile SK)
—	MF	SWE	Per Johansson (on loan to BK Forward)
—	FW	DEN	Kim Olsen (to Vejle Boldklub)
—	FW	SWE	Robin Staaf (on loan to Ängelholms FF)

== Superettan ==
=== Degerfors IF ===
In: Note: Flags indicate national team as defined under FIFA eligibility rules; some limited exceptions apply. Players may hold more than one non-FIFA nationality.

No.	Pos.	Nation	Player
—	MF	SWE	Niklas Klingberg (from BK Forward)
—	MF	SWE	Eric Jernberg (from IK Sirius)

Out: Note: Flags indicate national team as defined under FIFA eligibility rules; some limited exceptions apply. Players may hold more than one non-FIFA nationality.

No.	Pos.	Nation	Player
—	MF	SWE	Johan Bertilsson (to Kalmar FF)

=== Falkenbergs FF ===
In: Note: Flags indicate national team as defined under FIFA eligibility rules; some limited exceptions apply. Players may hold more than one non-FIFA nationality.

No.	Pos.	Nation	Player

Out: Note: Flags indicate national team as defined under FIFA eligibility rules; some limited exceptions apply. Players may hold more than one non-FIFA nationality.

No.	Pos.	Nation	Player
—	FW	SWE	Korab Gashi (on loan to Varberg BoIS)
—	MF	SWE	Sebastian Levinsson (on loan to Tvååkers IF)
—	MF	SWE	Peter Nilsson (on loan to Qviding FIF)

=== FC Väsby United ===
In: Note: Flags indicate national team as defined under FIFA eligibility rules; some limited exceptions apply. Players may hold more than one non-FIFA nationality.

No.	Pos.	Nation	Player
—	GK	SWE	Kristoffer Björklund (from Assyriska FF)
—	FW	SWE	Nabil Bahoui (on loan from IF Brommapojkarna)
—	FW	GAM	Alagie Sosseh (from Landskrona BoIS)

Out: Note: Flags indicate national team as defined under FIFA eligibility rules; some limited exceptions apply. Players may hold more than one non-FIFA nationality.

No.	Pos.	Nation	Player

=== GIF Sundsvall ===
In: Note: Flags indicate national team as defined under FIFA eligibility rules; some limited exceptions apply. Players may hold more than one non-FIFA nationality.

No.	Pos.	Nation	Player
—	MF	SWE	Fredrik Holster (from FC Väsby United)
—	DF	SWE	Mattias Nylund (from Trelleborgs FF)

Out: Note: Flags indicate national team as defined under FIFA eligibility rules; some limited exceptions apply. Players may hold more than one non-FIFA nationality.

No.	Pos.	Nation	Player

=== Hammarby IF ===
In: Note: Flags indicate national team as defined under FIFA eligibility rules; some limited exceptions apply. Players may hold more than one non-FIFA nationality.

No.	Pos.	Nation	Player
—	DF	DEN	Christian Traoré (loan return from Hønefoss BK)
—	FW	RSA	Nathan Paulse (loan return from Ajax Cape Town)

Out: Note: Flags indicate national team as defined under FIFA eligibility rules; some limited exceptions apply. Players may hold more than one non-FIFA nationality.

No.	Pos.	Nation	Player
—	FW	RSA	Nathan Paulse (on loan to Bloemfontein Celtic)
—	MF	SWE	Vlado Zlojutro (on loan to Ontinyent CF)

=== IFK Norrköping ===
In: Note: Flags indicate national team as defined under FIFA eligibility rules; some limited exceptions apply. Players may hold more than one non-FIFA nationality.

No.	Pos.	Nation	Player
—	FW	BRA	Caio Mendes (from Marília AC)
—	FW	BRA	Bruno Santos (free transfer)
—	GK	SWE	Abbas Hassan (on loan from IF Elfsborg)

Out: Note: Flags indicate national team as defined under FIFA eligibility rules; some limited exceptions apply. Players may hold more than one non-FIFA nationality.

No.	Pos.	Nation	Player
—	MF	SWE	Erik Jansson (on loan to IK Sleipner)

=== Jönköpings Södra IF ===
In: Note: Flags indicate national team as defined under FIFA eligibility rules; some limited exceptions apply. Players may hold more than one non-FIFA nationality.

No.	Pos.	Nation	Player
—	MF	NIR	Daryl Smylie (on loan from Kalmar FF)
—	DF	SWE	Markus Thorbjörnsson (on loan from Jönköpings Södra IF)

Out: Note: Flags indicate national team as defined under FIFA eligibility rules; some limited exceptions apply. Players may hold more than one non-FIFA nationality.

No.	Pos.	Nation	Player

=== Landskrona BoIS ===
In: Note: Flags indicate national team as defined under FIFA eligibility rules; some limited exceptions apply. Players may hold more than one non-FIFA nationality.

No.	Pos.	Nation	Player
—	DF	SWE	Jens Nordström (from IFK Klagshamn)

Out: Note: Flags indicate national team as defined under FIFA eligibility rules; some limited exceptions apply. Players may hold more than one non-FIFA nationality.

No.	Pos.	Nation	Player
—	FW	GAM	Alagie Sosseh (to FC Väsby United)

=== Ljungskile SK ===
In: Note: Flags indicate national team as defined under FIFA eligibility rules; some limited exceptions apply. Players may hold more than one non-FIFA nationality.

No.	Pos.	Nation	Player
—	MF	SWE	Erik Nilsson (on loan from Örebro SK) (Note: "LSK lånar Erik Nilsson från Örebro" (in Swedish). lsk.se. 2010-05-23.)

Out: Note: Flags indicate national team as defined under FIFA eligibility rules; some limited exceptions apply. Players may hold more than one non-FIFA nationality.

No.	Pos.	Nation	Player
—	DF	SWE	Johan Friberg da Cruz (to Assyriska BK)
—	MF	SWE	Erik Nilsson (loan return to Örebro SK)

=== Syrianska FC ===
In: Note: Flags indicate national team as defined under FIFA eligibility rules; some limited exceptions apply. Players may hold more than one non-FIFA nationality.

No.	Pos.	Nation	Player
—	FW	PLE	Imad Zatara (loan return from Nîmes)

Out: Note: Flags indicate national team as defined under FIFA eligibility rules; some limited exceptions apply. Players may hold more than one non-FIFA nationality.

No.	Pos.	Nation	Player
—	GK	SWE	Simon Nurme (to Örebro SK)

=== Ängelholms FF ===
In: Note: Flags indicate national team as defined under FIFA eligibility rules; some limited exceptions apply. Players may hold more than one non-FIFA nationality.

No.	Pos.	Nation	Player
—	MF	SWE	Marcus Bergholtz (on loan from Helsingborgs IF)
—	FW	SWE	Robin Staaf (on loan from Örebro SK)
—	DF	SWE	Pehr Andersson (on loan from Halmstads BK)
—	DF	SWE	Erik Johnsson (on loan from Borstahusens BK)
—	FW	SWE	Jörgen Nilsson (from Kristianstads FF)

Out: Note: Flags indicate national team as defined under FIFA eligibility rules; some limited exceptions apply. Players may hold more than one non-FIFA nationality.

No.	Pos.	Nation	Player
—	GK	SWE	Petter Augustsson (contract terminated)
—	DF	SWE	Igor Krulj (contract terminated)

=== Örgryte IS ===
In: Note: Flags indicate national team as defined under FIFA eligibility rules; some limited exceptions apply. Players may hold more than one non-FIFA nationality.

No.	Pos.	Nation	Player
—	MF	ISL	Steinþór Freyr Þorsteinsson (from Stjarnan)
—	MF	USA	Julian Stahler (free transfer)

Out: Note: Flags indicate national team as defined under FIFA eligibility rules; some limited exceptions apply. Players may hold more than one non-FIFA nationality.

No.	Pos.	Nation	Player
—	FW	SWE	Ken Fagerberg (loan return to FC Midtjylland)
—	MF	SWE	Seif Kadhim (on loan to Norrby IF)

=== Östers IF ===
In: Note: Flags indicate national team as defined under FIFA eligibility rules; some limited exceptions apply. Players may hold more than one non-FIFA nationality.

No.	Pos.	Nation	Player

Out: Note: Flags indicate national team as defined under FIFA eligibility rules; some limited exceptions apply. Players may hold more than one non-FIFA nationality.

No.	Pos.	Nation	Player
—	FW	SWE	Niklas Moberg (on loan to IK Sleipner) (Note: "Moberg till Sleipner" (in Swedish). osterfotboll.com. 2010-07-17.)

== See also ==
- Allsvenskan
- Superettan
