= 2007 Malmö FF season =

Malmö FF
2007 season
- Chairman: Bengt Madsen
- Manager: Sören Åkeby
- Stadium: Malmö Stadion
- Allsvenskan: 9th
- Svenska Cupen: Round 3
- Top goalscorer: League: Júnior (9); All: Júnior (16)
- Highest home attendance: 22,746 (7 August vs Helsingborgs IF, Allsvenskan)
- Lowest home attendance: 7,805 (28 October vs IF Elfsborg, Allsvenskan)
- Average home league attendance: 13,364 (Allsvenskan only)
Home colours	Away colours

The 2007 season was Malmö FF's 96th in existence, their 72nd season in Allsvenskan and their 7th consecutive season in the league. They competed in Allsvenskan where they finished in 9th position and Svenska Cupen where they were knocked out in the third round. The result in Allsvenskan was the club's worst league performance since the 2001 season when they also finished 9th, as a result of this, manager Sören Åkebys contract was not renewed and Roland Nilsson was announced as the new Malmö FF manager in October 2007.

== Players ==
=== Squad ===
Note: Flags indicate national team as defined under FIFA eligibility rules; some limited exceptions apply. Players may hold more than one non-FIFA nationality.

No.	Pos.	Nation	Player
1	GK	SWE	Håkan Svensson
2	DF	DEN	Ulrich Vinzents
3	DF	SWE	Daniel Theorin
4	DF	LBR	Jimmy Dixon
5	DF	BRA	Gabriel
7	DF	SWE	Anders Andersson
8	FW	BRA	Júnior
9	FW	SWE	Niklas Skoog
10	FW	FIN	Jari Litmanen
11	MF	SWE	Yksel Osmanovski
13	MF	SWE	Babis Stefanidis
14	DF	NOR	Jon Inge Høiland
16	DF	SWE	Christian Järdler
17	MF	SWE	Joakim Nilsson

No.	Pos.	Nation	Player
18	FW	NGA	Edward Ofere
19	MF	SWE	Johan Andersson
20	MF	SWE	Ola Toivonen
21	DF	CIV	Raoul Kouakou
22	MF	SWE	Robin Nilsson
23	MF	SWE	Labinot Harbuzi
24	MF	SWE	Philip Milenković
25	DF	SWE	Behrang Safari
26	FW	SWE	Marcus Pode
27	MF	SWE	Anes Mravac
30	MF	SWE	Daniel Andersson (Captain)
31	FW	FIN	Jonatan Johansson
34	FW	SWE	Guillermo Molins
35	GK	SWE	Jonas Sandqvist

=== Squad stats ===
No.	Pos	Nat	Player	Total		Allsvenskan		Svenska Cupen		Other	
No.	Pos	Nat	Player	Apps	Goals	Apps	Goals	Apps	Goals	Apps	Goals
1	GK	(Sweden) SWE	Håkan Svensson	1	0	0	0	1	0	0	0
2	DF	(Denmark) DEN	Ulrich Vinzents	38	1	25	0	2	0	11	1
3	FW	(Sweden) SWE	Daniel Theorin	9	0	1	0	1	0	7	0
4	DF	(Liberia) LBR	Jimmy Dixon	29	0	21	0	0	0	8	0
5	DF	(Brazil) BRA	Gabriel	23	0	13	0	2	0	8	0
7	MF	(Sweden) SWE	Anders Andersson	36	0	25	0	1	0	10	0
8	FW	(Brazil) BRA	Júnior	32	16	21	9	1	2	10	5
9	FW	(Sweden) SWE	Niklas Skoog	19	7	16	5	0	0	3	2
11	MF	(Sweden) SWE	Yksel Osmanovski	34	4	23	1	1	0	10	3
13	MF	(Sweden) SWE	Babis Stefanidis	10	0	10	0	0	0	0	0
14	DF	(Norway) NOR	Jon Inge Høiland	16	2	14	1	1	1	1	0
16	DF	(Sweden) SWE	Christian Järdler	21	1	12	0	2	0	7	1
17	MF	(Sweden) SWE	Joakim Nilsson	23	0	13	0	1	0	9	0
18	FW	(Nigeria) NGA	Edward Ofere	25	5	14	0	1	4	10	1
19	MF	(Sweden) SWE	Johan Andersson	8	2	5	0	2	2	1	0
20	FW	(Sweden) SWE	Ola Toivonen	35	7	24	3	2	2	9	2
21	DF	(Ivory Coast) CIV	Raoul Kouakou	5	0	0	0	0	0	5	0
22	MF	(Sweden) SWE	Robin Nilsson	3	0	0	0	0	0	3	0
23	MF	(Sweden) SWE	Labinot Harbuzi	14	0	12	0	0	0	2	0
24	DF	(Sweden) SWE	Philip Milenković	1	0	0	0	0	0	1	0
25	DF	(Sweden) SWE	Behrang Safari	35	0	24	0	1	0	10	0
26	FW	(Sweden) SWE	Marcus Pode	16	1	7	0	2	1	7	0
27	DF	(Sweden) SWE	Anes Mravac	1	0	0	0	0	0	1	0
30	MF	(Sweden) SWE	Daniel Andersson	34	4	23	4	2	0	9	0
31	FW	(Finland) FIN	Jonatan Johansson	29	6	21	6	1	0	7	0
34	MF	(Sweden) SWE	Guillermo Molins	13	0	9	0	2	0	2	0
35	GK	(Sweden) SWE	Jonas Sandqvist	34	0	26	0	1	0	7	0
–	MF	(Sweden) SWE	Daniel Sliper	4	1	0	0	0	0	4	1
–	GK	(Sweden) SWE	Jonnie Fedel	1	0	0	0	0	0	1	0
–	MF	(Sweden) SWE	Erdin Demir	1	0	0	0	1	0	0	0
–	FW	(Sweden) SWE	Agon Mehmeti	1	0	0	0	0	0	1	0
–	MF	(Sweden) SWE	Joakim Persson	2	0	0	0	0	0	2	0
–	MF	(Portugal) POR	Paulo Sérgio	1	0	0	0	0	0	1	0

== Club ==
=== Coaching staff ===
Position	Staff
Head Coach First Team	(Sweden) Sören Åkeby
Assistant Coach First Team	(Sweden) Anders Johansson
Assistant Coach First Team	(Sweden) Alf Westerberg

Source: MFF-aren 2007. Malmö FF. 2007.

=== Other information ===
Chairman	(Sweden) Bengt Madsen
Sport director	(Sweden) Hasse Borg
Ground (capacity and dimensions)	Malmö Stadion (27,500 / )

Source: MFF-aren 2007. Malmö FF. 2007.

== Competitions ==
=== Overall ===
Competition	Started round	Current position / round	Final position / round	First match	Last match
Allsvenskan	—	—	9th	7 April 2007	28 October 2007
Svenska Cupen	Round 2	—	Round 3	1 May 2007	24 May 2007

Source: Competitions

=== Allsvenskan ===
==== League table ====
Pos	Team	Pld	W	D	L	GF	GA	GD	Pts
7	Halmstads BK	26	9	9	8	33	41	−8	36
8	Helsingborgs IF	26	9	8	9	49	37	+12	35
9	Malmö FF	26	9	7	10	29	28	+1	34
10	Gefle IF	26	9	7	10	29	30	−1	34
11	GAIS	26	7	8	11	24	37	−13	29

Source: svenskfotboll.se (in Swedish)
Rules for classification: 1) points; 2) goal difference; 3) number of goals scored.

==== Results summary ====
Overall								Home						Away					
Pld	W	D	L	GF	GA	GD	Pts	W	D	L	GF	GA	GD	W	D	L	GF	GA	GD
26	9	7	10	29	28	+1	34	4	5	4	15	12	+3	5	2	6	14	16	−2

Source: svenskfotboll.se

==== Results by round ====
Round	1	2	3	4	5	6	7	8	9	10	11	12	13	14	15	16	17	18	19	20	21	22	23	24	25	26
Ground	A	H	A	H	H	A	A	H	A	H	H	A	A	H	A	H	A	H	A	H	H	A	A	H	A	H
Result	D	W	L	W	D	W	D	D	W	L	L	W	L	D	L	D	W	W	L	D	W	L	L	L	W	L
Position	4	4	8	2	3	3	2	4	2	5	7	4	5	6	7	8	8	6	9	7	7	8	8	9	7	9

Source: see below
A = Away; H = Home; W = Win; D = Draw; L = Loss

==== Matches ====
Kickoff times are in CEST.

7 April 2007 Round 1	IF Elfsborg	1–1	Malmö FF	Borås
16:00	Holmén 37'	Report	Johansson 28'	Stadium: Borås Arena; Attendance: 12,637; Referee: Martin Hansson (Holmsjö)

16 April 2007 Round 2	Malmö FF	1–0	GAIS	Malmö
19:00	Júnior 2'	Report		Stadium: Malmö Stadion; Attendance: 17,602; Referee: Stefan Johannesson (Stocksund

22 April 2007 Round 3	Trelleborgs FF	2–1	Malmö FF	Trelleborg
15:00	Augustsson 32'; Mensah 42'	Report	D.Andersson 59'	Stadium: Vångavallen; Attendance: 9,045; Referee: Jonas Eriksson (Stockholm)

28 April 2007 Round 4	Malmö FF	4–0	AIK	Malmö
16:00	Júnior 24', 48'; Toivonen 37'; Johansson 77'	Report		Stadium: Malmö Stadion; Attendance: 15,876; Referee: Peter Fröjdfeldt (Eskilstuna)

8 May 2007 Round 5	Malmö FF	1–1	Hammarby IF	Malmö
19:00	D.Andersson 9'	Report	Eguren 32'	Stadium: Malmö Stadion; Attendance: 15,607; Referee: Åke Andreasson (Stenungsund)

15 May 2007 Round 6	Helsingborgs IF	0–1	Malmö FF	Helsingborg
19:00		Report	Toivonen 26'	Stadium: Olympia; Attendance: 16,500; Referee: Peter Fröjdfeldt (Eskilstuna)

20 May 2007 Round 7	Örebro SK	1–1	Malmö FF	Örebro
17:00	Richardsson 90'	Report	D.Andersson 34'	Stadium: Behrn Arena; Attendance: 7,973; Referee: Markus Strömbergsson (Gävle)

27 May 2007 Round 8	Malmö FF	1–1	Gefle IF	Malmö
17:00	Høiland 2'	Report	Westlin 38'	Stadium: Malmö Stadion; Attendance: 11,408; Referee: Åke Andreasson (Stenungsund)

11 June 2007 Round 9	IF Brommapojkarna	0–1	Malmö FF	Stockholm
19:00		Report	Skoog 80'	Stadium: Stockholms Stadion; Attendance: 3,410; Referee: Jonas Eriksson (Stockholm)

14 June 2007 Round 10	Malmö FF	1–2	Halmstads BK	Malmö
19:00	Johansson 77'	Report	Tahirović 44'; Rosén 71'	Stadium: Malmö Stadion; Attendance: 14,328; Referee: Stefan Johannesson (Stocksund)

26 June 2007 Round 11	Malmö FF	1–2	Kalmar FF	Malmö
20:00	Osmanovski 42'	Report	Sorin 10'; Ari 73'	Stadium: Malmö Stadion; Attendance: 12,927; Referee: Peter Fröjdfeldt (Eskilstuna)

2 July 2007 Round 12	IFK Göteborg	1–2	Malmö FF	Gothenburg
19:00	Berg 69'	Report	Skoog 21'; Júnior 90'	Stadium: Ullevi; Attendance: 11,270; Referee: Stefan Johannesson (Stocksund)

7 July 2007 Round 13	Djurgårdens IF	1–0	Malmö FF	Stockholm
16:00	Kusi-Asare 69'	Report		Stadium: Stockholms Stadion; Attendance: 11,515; Referee: Peter Fröjdfeldt (Eskilstuna)

17 July 2007 Round 14	Malmö FF	1–1	Djurgårdens IF	Malmö
20:00	Johansson 56'	Report	Davids 29'	Stadium: Malmö Stadion; Attendance: 15,976; Referee: Jonas Eriksson (Stockholm)

1 August 2007 Round 15	Hammarby IF	1–0	Malmö FF	Stockholm
20:00	Paulinho 8'	Report		Stadium: Söderstadion; Attendance: 14,063; Referee: Peter Fröjdfeldt (Eskilstuna)

7 August 2007 Round 16	Malmö FF	1–1	Helsingborgs IF	Malmö
20:00	Júnior 34'	Report	Omotoyossi 54'	Stadium: Malmö Stadion; Attendance: 22,746; Referee: Martin Hansson (Holmsjö)

13 August 2007 Round 17	Halmstads BK	1–3	Malmö FF	Halmstad
19:00	Arvidsson 11'	Report	Johansson 20'; Júnior 67'; Skoog 90'	Stadium: Örjans Vall; Attendance: 10,127; Referee: Jonas Eriksson (Stockholm)

18 August 2007 Round 18	Malmö FF	2–0	IF Brommapojkarna	Malmö
16:00	D.Andersson 41'; Júnior 41'	Report		Stadium: Malmö Stadion; Attendance: 10,100; Referee: Sven-Martin Åkesson (Solna)

26 August 2007 Round 19	AIK	3–1	Malmö FF	Solna
17:00	Figueiredo 6', 65'; Pavey 11'	Report	Toivonen 89'	Stadium: Råsunda; Attendance: 23,212; Referee: Markus Strömbergsson (Gävle)

1 September 2007 Round 20	Malmö FF	0–0	Trelleborgs FF	Malmö
16:00		Report		Stadium: Malmö Stadion; Attendance: 9,186; Referee: Håkan Jonasson (Helsingborg)

17 September 2007 Round 21	Malmö FF	1–0	Örebro SK	Malmö
19:00	Júnior 48'	Report		Stadium: Malmö Stadion; Attendance: 8,954; Referee: Markus Strömbergsson (Gävle)

24 September 2007 Round 22	Gefle IF	2–1	Malmö FF	Gävle
19:00	Oremo 59'; Bapupa 90'	Report	Skoog 87'	Stadium: Strömvallen; Attendance: 4,423; Referee: Keijo Hyvärinen (Haparanda)

1 October 2007 Round 23	Kalmar FF	2–0	Malmö FF	Kalmar
19:00	Santin 28'; Ingelsten 35'	Report		Stadium: Fredriksskans; Attendance: 6,261; Referee: Markus Strömbergsson (Gävle)

6 October 2007 Round 24	Malmö FF	0–2	IFK Göteborg	Malmö
16:00		Report	Selakovic 34'; Hysén 73'	Stadium: Malmö Stadion; Attendance: 11,219; Referee: Jonas Eriksson (Stockholm)

22 October 2007 Round 25	GAIS	1–2	Malmö FF	Gothenburg
19:00	Christoforidis 53'	Report	Skoog 10'; Johansson 28'	Stadium: Ullevi; Attendance: 3,423; Referee: Stefan Johannesson (Stocksund)

28 October 2007 Round 26	Malmö FF	1–2	IF Elfsborg	Malmö
15:00	Júnior 11'	Report	A.Svensson 12'; M.Svensson 60'	Stadium: Malmö Stadion; Attendance: 7,805; Referee: Åke Andreasson (Stenungsund)

=== Svenska Cupen ===
Kickoff times are in CEST.

1 May 2007 Round 2	Stenungsunds IF	0–11	Malmö FF	Stenungsund
15:00		Report	Ofere 3', 49', 66', 83'; Pode 9'; Júnior 23', 60'; J.Andersson 42', 83'; Toivonen 73', 88'	Stadium: Nösnäsvallen; Attendance: 1,100; Referee: Antti Kanerva (Olofstorp)

24 May 2007 Round 3	Landskrona BoIS	2–1	Malmö FF	Landskrona
19:00	Dahlgren 15'; Nezirovac 39'	Report	Høiland 89'	Stadium: Landskrona IP; Attendance: 2,982; Referee: Håkan Jonasson (Helsingborg)

== Non competitive ==
=== Pre-season ===
10 February 2007 Friendly	Malmö FF (Sweden)	1–0	(Sweden) Stadslaget	Malmö, Sweden
13:00	Sliper 51'	Report		Stadium: Heleneholms IP; Attendance: 1,902; Referee: Martin Hansson

17 February 2007 Friendly	Malmö FF (Sweden)	4–0	(Denmark) Køge BK	Malmö, Sverige
13:00	Junior 11'; Toivonen 36'; Skoog 62'; Järdler 76'	Report		Stadium: Heleneholms IP; Attendance: 1,100; Referee: Daniel Stålhammar

24 February 2007 Friendly	Malmö FF (Sweden)	0–1	(Denmark) Herfølge BK	Malmö, Sweden
13:00		Report	Rynell 74'	Stadium: Heleneholms IP; Attendance: 500; Referee: Daniel Stålhammar

28 February 2007 Friendly	Malmö FF (Sweden)	0–1	(Sweden) Östers IF	Malmö, Sweden
15:00		Report	Bennett 84'	Stadium: Heleneholms IP; Attendance: 550; Referee: Håkan Jonasson

3 March 2007 Friendly	Malmö FF (Sweden)	2–1	(Denmark) FC Nordsjælland	Malmö, Sweden
13:00	Osmanovski 23'; Júnior 45'	Report	Okänd (X)	Stadium: Heleneholms IP; Attendance: 850; Referee: Håkan Jonasson

7 March 2007 Friendly	Malmö FF (Sweden)	4–0	(Sweden) Örgryte IS	Malmö, Sweden
15:00	Okänd 30'; Skoog 49'; Nilsson 84'; Toivonen 89'	Report		Stadium: Heleneholms IP; Attendance: 600; Referee: Håkan Jonasson

16 March 2007 Friendly	AGF (Denmark)	2–1	(Sweden) Malmö FF	Larnaca, Cyprus
14:00	Gjesing 15'; Graulund 26'	Report	Ofere 58'	Stadium: Okänt; Attendance: 0

19 March 2007 Friendly	Örebro SK (Sweden)	1–0	(Sweden) Malmö FF	Larnaca, Cyprus
14:00	Rodevåg 57'	Report		Stadium: Okänt; Attendance: 0

24 March 2007 Friendly	Malmö FF (Sweden)	2–1	(Norway) Lyn	Malmö, Sweden
13:00	Júnior 14'; Osmanovski 90'	Report	Hoff 36'	Stadium: Rosengårds IP; Attendance: 1,500; Referee: Rickard Ljungblad

28 March 2007 Friendly	Malmö FF (Sweden)	2–0	(Sweden) Falkenbergs FF	Malmö, Sweden
15:00	Junior 49'; Osmanovski 63'	Rapport		Stadium: Heleneholms IP; Attendance: 500; Referee: Roger Persson

=== Mid-season ===
27 July 2007 Friendly	Hansa Rostock (Germany)	1–0	(Sweden) Malmö FF	Kühlungsborn, Germany
18:00	Kern 65'	Report		Attendance: 0
