= Thorbjörnsson =

Thorbjörnsson may refer to:

- Markus Thorbjörnsson
- Guðmundur Þorbjörnsson
