= Amadaiya Rennie =

Liberian football player (born 1990)

Personal information
- Date of birth: 17 March 1990 (age 36)
- Place of birth: Monrovia, Liberia
- Height: 1.86 m (6 ft 1 in)
- Position: Right winger

Youth career
- LISCR FC
- LPRC Oilers
- Mighty Barrolle
- 2009: IF Elfsborg

Senior career*
Years	Team	Apps	(Gls)
2007–2008	Mighty Barrolle		
2010–2011	IF Elfsborg	2	(0)
2011	→ GAIS (loan)	5	(1)
2011–2013	Degerfors IF	71	(13)
2014–2016	Hammarby	39	(6)
2015	→ Brann (loan)	10	(1)
2016–2017	Antalyaspor	2	(0)
2019	Haras Hodoud	6	(0)
2019	Gönyeli	1	(0)
2020	UKM		
2021	IFK Eskilstuna	7	(0)

International career^{‡}
2007	Liberia U20	1	(0)
2010	Liberia	3	(0)
- * Club domestic league appearances and goals as of 20:07, 23 February 2020 (UTC) ‡ National team caps and goals as of 6 April 2016

Amadaiya Rennie (born 17 March 1990) is a Liberian former footballer who played as a forward.

== Club career ==
Following good performances at Mighty Barrolle he was voted most valuable player of the 2007 season, and also became team captain of the Liberia under-20 national football team. This drew the interest from several clubs, such as A.C. Siena and Portland Timbers, however following a trial with Allsvenskan club IF Elfsborg, he decided to sign for the Swedish team. Spending the 2009 season in the U-21 team he was signed to a first-team contract prior to the 2010 season.

On 22 March 2011, he was loaned out to Allsvenskan rivals GAIS, following a severe injury to fellow Elfsborg player Mohammed Abdulrahman who was on loan to GAIS.

On 1 July he signed with the Swedish Superettan club Degerfors IF, a contract that was to expire at the end of the 2011 season. On 4 October 2011 he signed a new contract with Degerfors, keeping him at the club for two more years.

In November 2013 he signed a three-year-long contract with Hammarby IF, leaving Degerfors as a free agent.

In August 2015, Rennie completed a season-long loan deal with Norwegian side Brann, with striker Jakob Orlov moving the opposite way.

== National team ==
Putting up a notable performance in Mighty Barrolle, Rennie was called up to the Liberia under-20 team, where he quickly became team captain. He was then in 2010 called up to the Liberia to participate in the 2012 Africa Cup of Nations qualification against Zimbabwe, he was however left out of the game as a reserve, he was then pulled up to the main squad against Mali, he started the match and was substituted off in the 82nd minute.
