= Daniel Ytterbom =

Swedish footballer

Personal information
- Date of birth: 18 September 1976 (age 50)
- Place of birth: Sweden
- Height: 1.90 m (6 ft 3 in)
- Position: Forward

Team information
- Current team: Sjötulls BK

Senior career*
Years	Team	Apps	(Gls)
1993–2007	Gefle IF	152	(24)
2007–	Sjötulls BK		
- * Club domestic league appearances and goals as of 11:32, 8 December 2008 (UTC)

Daniel Ytterbom (born 18 September 1976) is a Swedish former professional footballer.

Ytterbom began his career with Gefle IF, turning professional in 1993, having played for their Under-19 side. He had a trial with Torquay United in October 1999, but returned to Gefle and remained there until joining Sjötulls BK in January 2007.
