= Pär Asp =

Swedish footballer (born 1982)

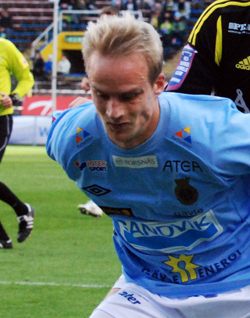

Personal information
- Full name: Pär Asp
- Date of birth: 14 August 1982 (age 44)
- Place of birth: Kiruna, Sweden
- Height: 1.81 m (5 ft 11 in)
- Position: Defender

Youth career
- Kiruna FF

Senior career*
| Years | Team | Apps | (Gls) |
| 2000–2006 | Kiruna FF | | |
| 2006–2010 | IF Brommapojkarna | 114 | (1) |
| 2011–2013 | Gefle IF | 72 | (0) |
| 2014–2017 | Varbergs BoIS | 107 | (2) |
- * Club domestic league appearances and goals

Pär Asp (born 14 August 1982) is a Swedish retired footballer who played as a defender.
