= Islingby IK =

Swedish football club

- Full name: Islingby Idrottsklubb/IIK
- Nickname: Tigers
- Ground: Idunvallen, Borlänge, Sweden
- Chairman: Jan Rosell
- Coach: Felix Karlsson
- League: Division 6 Dalarna Norra Dalarna
- 2024: 1st (Promoted)
Home colours

Islingby IK is a Swedish football club located in Borlänge. Islingby IK competes in Division 6 Dalarna Norra, which is the 8th tier in the Swedish football pyramid, and is part of the Division 6 system. The club was founded in 1935, and its home ground is Idunvallen, located in Islingby, east of the city centre.

== Background ==
Islingby IK currently plays in Division 6 Dalarna Norra which is the 8th tier of Swedish football. They play their home matches at the Idunvallen in Borlänge.

The club is affiliated to Dalarnas Fotbollförbund. Islingby IK have competed in the Svenska Cupen on 14 occasions and have played 32 matches in the competition. The club played in the 2011 Svenska Cupen but lost 0–4 at home to Hudiksvalls ABK in the preliminary round. Their best season in the competition was in the 1994-95 Svenska Cupen when they reached the fourth round before losing 2–5 at home to IK Brage before 512 spectators.

The club senior team was dissolved after the 2011 season, primarily due to financial difficulties and declining performance. The club had faced economic challenges, and its inability to maintain a competitive team led to a decision to dissolve the senior team in the winter of 2012.

The senior team was revived after 12 years in the Winter of 2024, and restarted its football journey in the 9th tier of Swedish football Division 7 Dalarna Norra, with one of the youngest squads in Sweden. Islingby IK finished 4th in their first season back in senior football. In their second season, they secured promotion to Division 6 after a 1–2 away win vs Avesta AIK U on the final match day, after goals from Wiggo Björlund and Emil Jansson and a successful performance from Vincent Skansen in goal.

== Arena ==
Idunvallen has been the home ground for Islingby IK since its creation in 1958. Islingby IK moved from Islingbyvallen after the 1957 season. Idunvallen has a capacity of less than 500. .

== Coaching staff ==
Position	Staff
Head coach	(Sweden) Felix Karlsson
Assistant coach	(Sweden) Markus Anfält (Sweden) Patrik Hjulström
Goalkeeping coach	(Sweden) Christoffer Bäck
Sports director	(Sweden) Lars Ekemark

== Player records ==
Players with the most competitive appearances for the senior team since 2023.

Rank	Player	Matches	Minutes	Period
1	Kevin Söderblom	27	2245	2023-present
2	Vincent Skansen	23	2050	2023–present
3	Wiggo Björlund	21	1360	2023–present
4	Pål Malmberg	20	1620	2023–present
5	Benjamin Byström	20	1280	2023-present
6	Per Wiklund	18	810	2023–2024
7	Malte Boberg	17	1430	2023-present
8	Robin Söderblom	17	1260	2023–2024
9	Patrik Hjulström	16	1400	2023–present
10	Kalle Anfält	15	1350	2023-2024
11	Thomas Brahn	15	1260	2023-2024
12	Emil Jansson	15	1180	2023-present
13	Christoffer Källviks Lantz	15	1110	2023-present
14	Marco Jorge	14	1170	2023-2024
15	Rasmus Pontelius	14	1160	2023-2024

=== Top goalscorers ===
Players with the most competitive goals for the senior team since 2023.

Rank	Player	Goals	Matches	Ratio	Career
1	Wiggo Björlund	15	21	0.71	2023–present
2	Hjalmar Isberg	14	12	1.17	2023-2024
3	Marco Jorge	14	14	1	2023-2024
4	Emil Jansson	11	15	0.73	2023–present
5	Mahad Mahamud Mohamed	8	11	0.73	2023–present
6	Rasmus Pontelius	7	14	0.5	2023–2024
7	Axel Wolgast	4	14	0.29	2023-2024
8	Nils Ekemark	3	10	0.3	2024–present
9	Hugo Hedin	2	9	0.22	2024–present
10	Robin Söderblom	2	17	0.12	2023-2024
11	Malte Boberg	2	17	0.12	2023–present
12	Benjamin Byström	2	20	0.1	2023–present
13	Kevin Söderblom	2	27	0.07	2023–present

== Season to season ==
Every season Islingby IK has competed in Swedish senior football:

Season	Level	Division	Section	Position	Movements
1936-37	Tier 6	Division 6	Dalaserien Klass 2 och Grupp 3	1st	Promoted
1937-38	Tier 5	Division 5	Dalaserien Klass 1 Grupp 2	5th	
1938-39	Tier 5	Division 5	Dalaserien Klass 1 Grupp 2	2nd	
1939-40	Tier 5	Division 5	Dalaserien Klass 1 Grupp 2	4th	
1940-41	Tier 5	Division 5	Dalaserien Grupp 2	1st	Promoted
1941-1942	Tier 4	Division 4	Dalarna Eliteserie Östra	1st	Promoted
1942–43	Tier 3	Division 3	Uppsvenska Sydvästra	4th	
1943–44	Tier 3	Division 3	Uppsvenska Sydvästra	8th	
1944–45	Tier 3	Division 3	Uppsvenska Sydvästra	5th	
1945–46	Tier 3	Division 3	Uppsvenska Sydvästra	7th	
1946–47	Tier 3	Division 3	Uppsvenska Sydvästra	9th	Relegated
1947-48	Tier 5	Division 5	Dalarnas Elitserie	8th	
1948-49	Tier 5	Division 5	Dalarnas Elitserie	10th	Relegated
1949-50	Tier 6	Division 6	Dalaserien klass 1 södra	2nd	
1950-51	Tier 6	Division 6	Dalaserien klass 1 södra	1st	Promoted
1951-52	Tier 5	Division 5	Dalarnas Elitserie	2nd	
1952-53	Tier 5	Division 5	Dalarnas Elitserie	1st	Promoted
1953-54	Tier 4	Division 4	Dalarna	1st	Promoted
1954-55	Tier 3	Division 3	Norra Svealand	6th	
1955-56	Tier 3	Division 3	Norra Svealand	11th	Relegated
1956-57	Tier 4	Division 4	Dalarna	7th	
1957-58	Tier 4	Division 4	Dalarna	4th	

League restructuring in 1958 resulted in a season only being played in one single year.

Season	Level	Division	Section	Position	Movements
1959	Tier 4	Division 4	Dalarna	2nd	Promotion Playoffs
1960	Tier 4	Division 4	Dalarna	1st	Promoted
1961	Tier 3	Division 3	Norra Svealand	5th	
1962	Tier 3	Division 3	Norra Svealand	11th	Relegated
1963	Tier 4	Division 4	Dalarna	11th	Relegated
1964	Tier 5	Division 5	Dalarna södra	6th	
1965	Tier 5	Division 5	Dalarna norra	7th	
1966	Tier 5	Division 5	Dalarna södra	6th	
1967	Tier 5	Division 5	Dalarna mellersta	4th	
1968	Tier 5	Division 5	Dalarna mellersta	1st	Promoted
1969	Tier 4	Division 4	Dalarna	12th	Relegated
1970	Tier 5	Division 5	Dalarna mellersta	2nd	Promoted
1971	Tier 4	Division 4	Dalarna	9th	Relegated
1972	Tier 5	Division 5	Dalarna mellersta	1st	Promoted
1973	Tier 4	Division 4	Dalarna	8th	
1974	Tier 4	Division 4	Dalarna	7th	
1975	Tier 4	Division 4	Dalarna	11th	Relegated
1976	Tier 5	Division 5	Dalarna mellersta	6th	
1977	Tier 5	Division 5	Dalarna mellersta	4th	
1978	Tier 5	Division 5	Dalarna mellersta	1st	Promoted
1979	Tier 4	Division 4	Dalarna	11th	Relegated
1980	Tier 5	Division 5	Dalarna södra	8th	
1981	Tier 5	Division 5	Dalarna södra	6th	
1982	Tier 5	Division 5	Dalarna södra	8th	
1983	Tier 5	Division 5	Dalarna södra	6th	
1984	Tier 5	Division 5	Dalarna södra	7th	
1985	Tier 5	Division 5	Dalarna södra	2nd	
1986	Tier 5	Division 5	Dalarna mellersta	1st	Promoted
1987*	Tier 5	Division 4	Dalarna	7th	
1988	Tier 5	Division 4	Dalarna	4th	
1989	Tier 5	Division 4	Dalarna	11th	
1990	Tier 5	Division 4	Dalarna	6th	
1991	Tier 5	Division 4	Dalarna	8th	
1992	Tier 5	Division 4	Dalarna	2nd	
1993	Tier 5	Division 4	Dalarna	6th	
1994	Tier 5	Division 4	Dalarna	9th	
1995	Tier 5	Division 4	Dalarna	9th	
1996	Tier 5	Division 4	Dalarna	2nd	Promotion Playoffs – Promoted
1997	Tier 4	Division 3	Södra Norrland	10th	Relegated
1998	Tier 5	Division 4	Dalarna	2nd	Promotion Playoffs
1999	Tier 5	Division 4	Dalarna	1st	Promoted
2000	Tier 4	Division 3	Södra Norrland	6th	
2001	Tier 4	Division 3	Södra Norrland	8th	
2002	Tier 4	Division 3	Södra Norrland	8th	
2003	Tier 4	Division 3	Södra Norrland	10th	Relegated
2004	Tier 5	Division 4	Dalarna	3rd	
2005	Tier 5	Division 4	Dalarna	5th	
2006*	Tier 6	Division 4	Dalarna	7th	
2007	Tier 6	Division 4	Dalarna	12th	Relegated
2008	Tier 7	Division 5	Dalarna Södra	1st	Promoted
2009	Tier 6	Division 4	Dalarna	6th	
2010	Tier 6	Division 4	Dalarna	9th	
2011	Tier 6	Division 4	Dalarna	9th	
2023*	Tier 9	Division 7	Dalarna Södra	4th	
2024	Tier 9	Division 7	Dalarna Södra	1st	Promoted

* League restructuring in 1987 resulted in a new division being created at Tier 2 and subsequent divisions dropping a level.

* League restructuring in 2006 resulted in a new division being created at Tier 3 and subsequent divisions dropping a level.

Islingby IK didn't participate in the seasons: 2012-2022.

*In 2023 Islingby IK restarted in the 9th tier.
