= Petter Lennartsson =

Swedish footballer

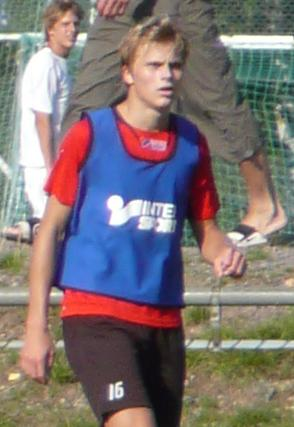

Personal information
- Full name: Petter Oskar Lennartsson
- Date of birth: 13 March 1988 (age 38)
- Place of birth: Sweden
- Height: 1.87 m (6 ft 2 in)
- Position: Defender

Team information
- Current team: Elverum
- Number: 3

Senior career*
Years	Team	Apps	(Gls)
2008–2010	Kalmar	6	(0)
2011–2012	Nybergsund-Trysil		
2013–	Elverum	10	(0)
- * Club domestic league appearances and goals

Petter Oskar Lennartsson (born 13 March 1988) is a Swedish footballer, currently playing for Elverum. He has made two appearances as a sub in Allsvenskan.

== Career statistics ==
Club	Season	Division	League		Cup		Total	
Club	Season	Division	Apps	Goals	Apps	Goals	Apps	Goals
2008	Kalmar	Allsvenskan	4	0	0	0	4	0
2009	Kalmar	Allsvenskan	2	0	0	0	2	0
2010	Kalmar	Allsvenskan	0	0	0	0	0	0
2011	Nybergsund-Trysil	Adeccoligaen	29	1	2	0	31	1
2012	Nybergsund-Trysil	2. divisjon						
2013	Elverum	Adeccoligaen	10	0	0	0	10	0
Career Total			70	1	2	0	72	1
