= Fredrik Jansson =

Swedish footballer

Personal information
- Date of birth: 20 September 1976 (age 50)
- Height: 1.86 m (6 ft 1 in)
- Position: Defender

Youth career
- Forssa BK
- 1990–1995: Islingby IK

Senior career*
Years	Team	Apps	(Gls)
1996–2007	Örebro SK		
2004	→ IK Brage		
2008–2010	IK Brage		
- * Club domestic league appearances and goals

Fredrik Jansson (born 20 September 1976) is a Swedish retired football defender.
