= Håkan Svensson =

Swedish footballer (born 1970)

Personal information
- Full name: Alf Tommy Håkan Svensson
- Date of birth: 20 January 1970 (age 56)
- Place of birth: Halmstad, Sweden
- Height: 1.94 m (6 ft 4 in)
- Position: Goalkeeper

Youth career
- –1990: Rydöbruks IF

Senior career*
Years	Team	Apps	(Gls)
1990–2002	Halmstads BK	281	(0)
2003–2004	AIK	51	(0)
2005	Paralimni FC	9	(0)
2005	IF Elfsborg	7	(0)
2006	BK Häcken	2	(0)
2006	Malmö FF	1	(0)
Total		331	(0)

International career
1990–1992	Sweden U21/O	5	(0)
1998–2001	Sweden	3	(0)

Managerial career
- 2008–2012: Falkenberg (assistant)
- 2014–2016: Halmstads BK (goalkeeping coach)
- 2017: Landskrona BoIS (assistant)
- * Club domestic league appearances and goals

Alf Tommy Håkan Svensson (born 20 January 1970) is a Swedish former professional footballer who played as a goalkeeper.

He is best remembered for representing Halmstads BK between 1990 and 2002, with which he won two Allsvenskan titles as well as the 1994–95 Svenska Cupen. He also represented AIK, Paralimni FC, IF Elfsborg, BK Häcken, and Malmö FF during a career that spanned between 1990 and 2006.

A full international between 1998 and 2001, he won three caps for the Sweden national team. He also represented the Sweden Olympic team at the 1992 Summer Olympics.

== Club career ==
Svensson represented Halmstads BK between 1990 and 2002, winning Allsvenskan twice in 1997 and 2000 and the 1994–95 Svenska Cupen. In 2003 he moved to rival team AIK claiming he wanted to win titles. This failed and his contract was ended in 2004 after some disagreements with the club. In early 2005 he signed a six-month contract with Paralimni FC from Cyprus, later in 2005 he returned to Sweden as a back-up goalkeeper for IF Elfsborg. He also represented BK Häcken and Malmö FF in 2006. He retired as a player at the end of Allsvenskan in 2007.

== International career ==
Svensson represented the Sweden U21 team at the 1992 UEFA European Under-21 Championship, as well as the Sweden Olympic team at the 1992 Summer Olympics where he served as a back-up goalkeeper for Jan Ekholm.

He made his full international debut for Sweden on 29 January 1998, keeping a clean sheet in a friendly 2–0 win against Jamaica. He won his third and last cap on 31 January 2001 in a friendly 0–0 draw with the Faroe Islands.

== Coaching career ==
In late 2007 he signed a contract as assistant manager for Falkenbergs FF in Superettan.

== Personal life ==
He is the father of football player Rasmus Wiedesheim-Paul.

== Honours ==
Halmstads BK

- Allsvenskan: 1997, 2000
- Svenska Cupen: 1994–95

Individual

- Swedish goalkeeper of the year: 2000
- Longest time without conceding a goal in Allsvenskan: 808 minutes
