= 1994–95 Svenska Cupen =

Tournament details
- Country: Sweden
- Teams: 594

Final positions
- Champions: Halmstads BK
- Runners-up: AIK

Tournament statistics
- Matches played: 593

The 1994–95 Svenska Cupen was the 40th season of the main Swedish football Cup. The competition was concluded on 25 May 1995, with the final held in Gamla Ullevi, Gothenburg. Halmstads BK won 3–1 against AIK before an attendance of 4,889 spectators.

== Preliminary round 1 ==
For results see SFS-Bolletinen - Matcher i Svenska Cupen.

== Preliminary round 2 ==
Tie no	Home team	Score	Away team	Attendance
1	Islingby IK (D4)	5–1	Korsnäs IF FK (D3)	

For other results see SFS-Bolletinen - Matcher i Svenska Cupen.

== First round ==
Tie no	Home team	Score	Away team	Attendance
1	Högs SK (D4)	1–3	Islingby IK (D4)	

For other results see SFS-Bolletinen - Matcher i Svenska Cupen.

== Second round ==
Tie no	Home team	Score	Away team	Attendance
1	Islingby IK (D4)	2–0	IFK Mora FK (D3)	

For other results see SFS-Bolletinen - Matcher i Svenska Cupen.

== Third round ==
Tie no	Home team	Score	Away team	Attendance
1	Islingby IK (D4)	1–0	Stockviks FF (D3)	123

For other results see SFS-Bolletinen - Matcher i Svenska Cupen.

== Fourth round ==
Tie no	Home team	Score	Away team	Attendance
1	Islingby IK (D4)	2–5	IK Brage (D1)	512

For other results see SFS-Bolletinen - Matcher i Svenska Cupen.

== Fifth round ==
The 8 matches in this round were played between 21 September 1994 and 2 April 1995.

Tie no	Home team	Score	Away team	Attendance
1	Motala AIF (D2)	2–4	Djurgårdens IF (D1)	1,000
2	Örgryte IS (D1)	2–3 (gg)	AIK (A)	468
3	Västerås SK (D1)	4–0	Landskrona BoIS (A)	453
4	Helsingborgs IF (A)	3–1	BK Häcken (A)	4,288
5	Gefle IF (D1)	1–3	IK Brage (D1)	317
6	Assyriska Föreningen (D2)	2–1 (gg)	Västra Frölunda IF (A)	500
7	IFK Göteborg (A)	3–0	Östers IF (A)	1,402
8	Halmstads BK (A)	2–1	Malmö FF (A)	1,259

== Quarter-finals ==
The 4 matches in this round were played between 6 April and 13 April 1995.

Tie no	Home team	Score	Away team	Attendance
1	Helsingborgs IF (A)	4–0	IK Brage (D1)	3,111
2	Västerås SK (D1)	1–3	IFK Göteborg (A)	4,746
3	Halmstads BK (A)	3–1	Assyriska Föreningen (D2)	533
4	AIK (A)	1–0	Djurgårdens IF (D1)	5,354

== Semi-finals ==
The semi-finals in this round were played on 4 May 1995.

Tie no	Home team	Score	Away team	Attendance
1	AIK (A)	1–0	IFK Göteborg (A)	5,751
2	Helsingborgs IF (A)	0–2	Halmstads BK (A)	7,106

== Final ==
The final was played on 25 May 1995 in Gothenburg.

Tie no	Team 1	Score	Team 2	Attendance
1	Halmstads BK (A)	3–1	AIK (A)	4,889
