= Joakim Edström =

Swedish footballer (born 1992)

Personal information
- Full name: Joakim Edström
- Date of birth: 27 November 1992 (age 33)
- Place of birth: Sweden
- Height: 1.83 m (6 ft 0 in)
- Position: Forward

Youth career
- Näsets SK

Senior career*
Years	Team	Apps	(Gls)
2009–2011	Västra Frölunda IF	30	(5)
2011–2015	GAIS	8	(0)
2011	→ Varbergs BoIS (loan)	1	(0)
2013–2014	→ Utsiktens BK (loan)	22	(6)
2015–2016	Utsiktens BK	26	(5)
- * Club domestic league appearances and goals as of 13 April 2017 (UTC)

Joakim Edström (born 27 November 1992) is a Swedish footballer who plays as a forward. He is son of the former Sweden national team player Ralf Edström.
