= Simon Nurme =

Swedish footballer (born 1982)

Personal information
- Full name: Nils Simon Erik Nurme
- Date of birth: November 24, 1982 (age 43)
- Place of birth: Laxå, Sweden
- Height: 1.92 m (6 ft 3 1/2 in)
- Position: Goalkeeper

Team information
- Current team: Laxå IF

Youth career
- Röfors IF
- Laxå IF
- Örebro SK

Senior career*
Years	Team	Apps	(Gls)
2003–2006	Örebro SK	0	(0)
2007–2008	Degerfors IF	41	(0)
2009	Syrianska FC	10	(0)
2010–2011	Örebro SK	3	(0)
2012–2014	IFK Mariehamn	44	(0)
2015–2016	BK Simperon		
2016–	Laxå IF		
- * Club domestic league appearances and goals as of 2 July 2012

Nils Simon Erik Nurme (born November 24, 1982, in Laxå, Sweden) is a Swedish football goalkeeper currently playing for Laxå IF.
