= Mohammed Abdulrahman (footballer, born September 1989) =

Nigerian footballer (born 1989)

Personal information
- Date of birth: 16 September 1989 (age 37)
- Place of birth: Nigeria
- Height: 1.79 m (5 ft 10 in)
- Position: Striker

Team information
- Current team: Vårgårda IK
- Number: 14

Youth career
- Pepsi Academy

Senior career*
Years	Team	Apps	(Gls)
2008–2009	Syrianska FC	2	(0)
2008	→ Syrianska Botkyrka IF (loan)	9	(1)
2009–2011	Motala AIF	45	(20)
2011–2014	IF Elfsborg	0	(0)
2011	→ GAIS (loan)	1	(0)
2012	→ IFK Värnamo (loan)	11	(5)
2013	→ GAIS (loan)	11	(3)
2014–2016	Motala AIF	24	(5)
2017–	Vårgårda IK	82	(47)
- * Club domestic league appearances and goals as of 23:35, 6 January 2022 (UTC)

Mohammed Abdulrahman (born 16 September 1989) is a Nigerian professional footballer who plays as a striker for Swedish club Vårgårda IK.

== Career ==
Abdulrahman scored 16 goals in the Division 2 Östra Götaland for Motala AIF in the 2010 season. In January 2011, he signed a three-year contract with IF Elfsborg, and was immediately loaned out to GAIS.

Abdulrahman scored in his first two matches for GAIS, against Norwegian IK Start and Halmstads BK in the friendly tournament Color Line Cup in Kristiansand in January 2011. However, he injured his cruciate ligament in a pre-season match against Qviding FIF and missed the entire 2011 season. In 2012 he played for IFK Värnamo, and in 2013 he played again for GAIS. Before the 2014 season, Abdulrahman returned to Motala AIF.

In November 2016, Abdulrahman signed for Division 2 club Vårgårda IK.
