= Daniel Theorin =

Swedish footballer

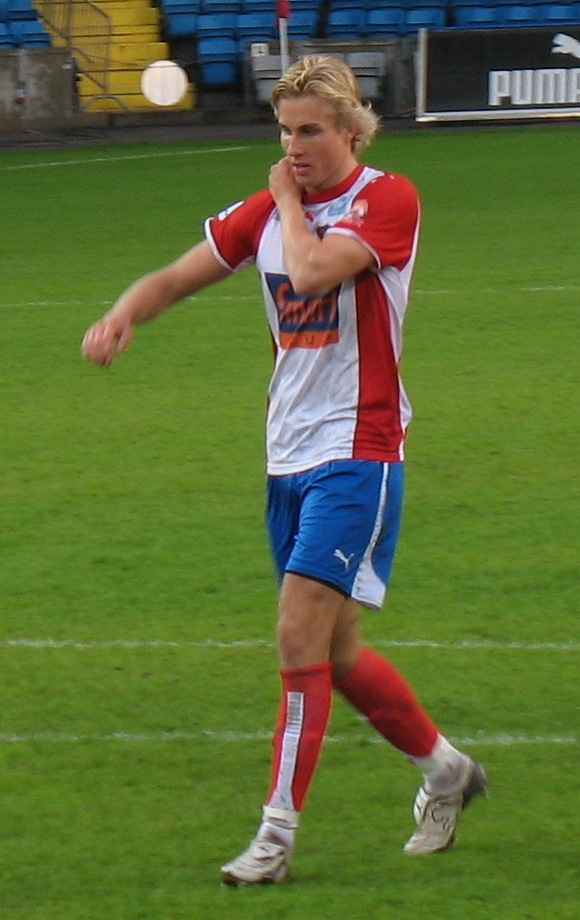

Personal information
- Full name: Bo Daniel Theorin
- Date of birth: 4 August 1983 (age 43)
- Place of birth: Härnösand, Sweden
- Height: 1.91 m (6 ft 3 in)
- Position: Defender

Youth career
- –1999: IF Älgarna
- 1999–2002: GIF Sundsvall
- 2001: → Selånger SK (loan)
- 2002: IFK Timrå

Senior career*
| Years | Team | Apps | (Gls) |
| 2003 | IFK Timrå | 19 | (3) |
| 2004 | Friska Viljor | 23 | (0) |
| 2005–2006 | FK Lyn | 34 | (2) |
| 2007 | Malmö FF | 1 | (0) |
| 2007 | → Landskrona BoIS (loan) | 9 | (0) |
| 2008–2011 | Gefle IF | 93 | (4) |
| 2012–2014 | Hammarby IF | 56 | (1) |
| 2015–2017 | IK Frej | 18 | (0) |
- * Club domestic league appearances and goals

Bo Daniel Theorin (born 4 August 1983) is a retired Swedish footballer, who played as a defender.

He had a 3 1/2-year-long successful stint in Gefle IF, but left the club in November 2011, signing a three-year contract with Hammarby. He left Hammarby in November 2014, after a three-year stint at the Stockholm based club.

Theorin previously played for FC Lyn Oslo in the Norwegian Premier League and Malmö FF whom he left in June 2008.
