= Erik Nilsson (footballer, born 1989) =

Swedish footballer

Personal information
- Date of birth: 30 July 1989 (age 37)
- Place of birth: Sweden
- Height: 1.83 m (6 ft 0 in)
- Position: Midfielder

Youth career
- IK Sturehov

Senior career*
Years	Team	Apps	(Gls)
2006–2008	Örebro SK Ungdom	19	(4)
2009–2011	Örebro SK	18	(0)
2010	→ Ljungskile SK (loan)	20	(4)
2011	→ Ljungskile SK (loan)	11	(4)
2012–2015	Degerfors IF	91	(1)
2016–2018	IK Brage	71	(12)
2019	Carlstad United BK	29	(6)
2020–2021	IF Karlstad	55	(6)
2022–2023	FBK Karlstad	27	(7)

International career
2004	Sweden U17	4	(0)
2006	Sweden U19	4	(0)
2009–2010	Sweden U21	2	(0)
- * Club domestic league appearances and goals as of 30 January 2019

Erik Nilsson (born 30 July 1989) is a Swedish footballer who last played for FBK Karlstad as a midfielder.

== Career ==
He moved from Allsvenskan team Örebro SK to Degerfors IF ahead of the 2012 season.

Nilsson left IK Brage after the 2018 season. This was announced on 16 November 2018.
