= Philip Milenković =

Swedish footballer

Personal information
- Full name: Philip Robert Milenković
- Date of birth: 11 November 1988 (age 37)
- Place of birth: Sweden
- Height: 1.80 m (5 ft 11 in)
- Position: Right back

Team information
- Current team: KSF Prespa Birlik

Youth career
- –2006: Malmö FF

Senior career*
Years	Team	Apps	(Gls)
2006–2009	Malmö FF	1	(0)
2008–2009	→ IFK Malmö (loan)	21	(0)
2010	→ Lunds BK (loan)	10	(0)
2010	Trelleborgs FF	4	(0)
2011	Radnički Obrenovac	10	(0)
2016–	KSF Prespa Birlik	5	(0)
- * Club domestic league appearances and goals as of 1 August 2011

Philip Milenkovic (born 11 November 1988) is a Swedish footballer currently playing for KSF Prespa Birlik. Philip signed with Trelleborgs FF on 1 April 2010 in Sweden. His agent was FIFA licensed Jovica Radonjić.
