= José Júnior =

Brazilian footballer

Júnior
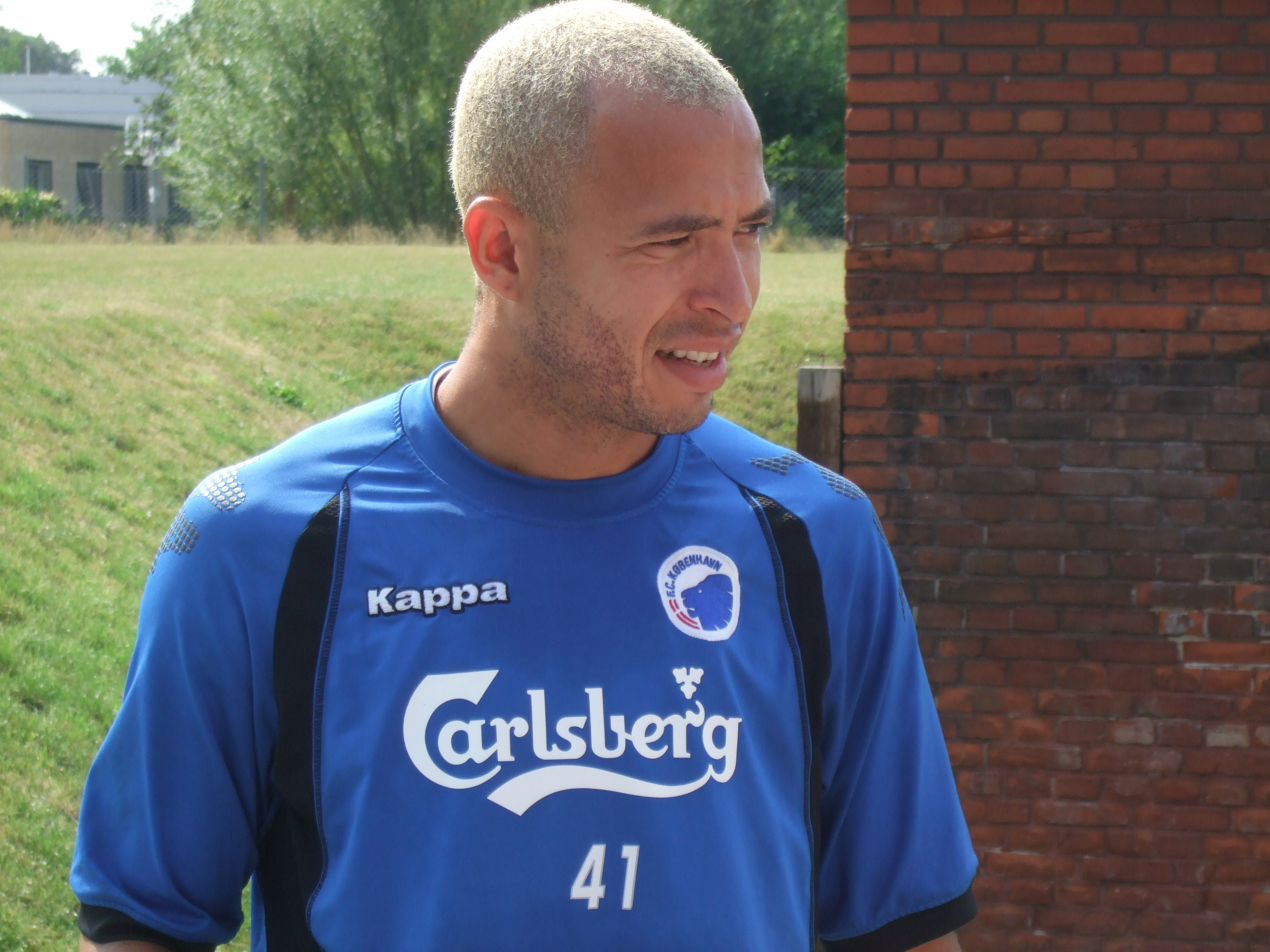

Personal information
- Full name: José Luiz Guimarães Sanabio Júnior
- Date of birth: 15 June 1976 (age 50)
- Place of birth: Fortaleza, Brazil
- Height: 1.87 m (6 ft 1 1/2 in)
- Position: Striker

Youth career
- 1996–1998: Ferroviário

Senior career*
Years	Team	Apps	(Gls)
1998	Fortaleza		
1999	Unión Española		
1999–2000	Córdoba	5	(0)
2000–2001	Beveren	29	(2)
2001–2002	Ajaccio	9	(2)
2002	Treze		
2002–2003	Walsall	36	(15)
2003–2005	Derby County	30	(4)
2004–2005	→ Rotherham United (loan)	12	(2)
2005	Watford	0	(0)
2005–2006	OB	16	(9)
2006–2007	Malmö	38	(17)
2008–2009	Copenhagen	17	(6)
2009	→ Nordsjælland (loan)	11	(5)
2009	→ Randers (loan)	10	(5)
2010	Vitória	31	(8)
2011	Ceará	4	(1)
2011–2012	Bahia	47	(9)
2013	ABC	2	(0)
2014	Tiradentes	6	(2)
2014–2015	Juazeirense	7	(3)
2016	Jacuipense	1	(0)
- * Club domestic league appearances and goals as of 2 March 2016

José Luiz Guimarães Sanabio Júnior, nicknamed Júnior Pipoca (Junior Popcorn), Diabo Loiro (Blonde Devil), or simply Júnior, (born 15 June 1976) is a Brazilian football striker playing for Jacuipense of the Brazilian Bahia State Championship.

He represented many clubs, including Derby County and Rotherham United, and has played in eight countries.

== Biography ==
Born in Fortaleza, Brazil, Júnior arrived in Europe and at English First Division side Walsall from Brazilian side Treze at the beginning of the 2002–03 season. Júnior and Jorge Leitão formed a Portuguese speaking front-line that was envied by most clubs in the league. Between them they scored 29 goals during the course of the season, Júnior scoring 16 of them, for a side which many believe was the most talented Walsall team since the club's golden era under Bill Moore in the late 1950s and early 1960s.

Despite the best efforts of Walsall manager Colin Lee to sign him permanently, Júnior moved on to Derby County in August 2003; in his final game at the Bescot Stadium, he had demonstrated his skills perfectly by scoring a hat-trick against the Rams. Júnior got off to a good start at Derby, forming a talented partnership up front with Charlton loanee Mathias Svensson, but Svensson was recalled by Charlton. Júnior then injured a cruciate knee ligament in September, and, when he had recovered, he did not get much of a chance to play. He moved to Rotherham United (on loan) and to Watford, who sold him due to a problem with legal paperwork and his apparent lack of correct personal permits.

Júnior then moved to Denmark in October 2005, to OB. He scored nine goals in 16 matches, before being sold to Swedish club Malmö on 1 July 2006. He scored 17 goals in 38 appearances for Malmö, increasing his reputation in Sweden. On 16 April 2007, he famously scored Malmö's 3000th goal in Swedish league history, when he scored the opening goal against GAIS after one minute.

Copenhagen signed José Junior on 31 January 2008. He spent much of his time there on the bench because of the stiff competition from Morten Nordstrand and fellow Brazilians Aílton Almeida and César Santin. He signed with Nordsjælland on loan in February 2009.

In May 2009, José Junior threatened not to show up for the game between Nordsjælland and Copenhagen, because he refused to be a substitute. Nordsjælland manager Morten Wieghorst subsequently announced that José Junior had played his last game for the club.

On 23 November 2009, Júnior agreed with Copenhagen to suspend his contract. It was then supposed that Júnior should sign with Randers, whom he was previously loaned to, but his contract was cancelled as he had not attended the latest training sessions. He then returned to his homeland Brazil and signed for Vitória in February 2010.

Júnior helped Vitória reach the final of the 2010 Copa do Brasil, scoring seven goals in the competition, including one against Santos in the final's second leg. Despite scoring eight goals for the club in 2010 Campeonato Brasileiro Série A, Vitória were relegated, and Júnior signed for Ceará for the 2011 season.

In June 2011, Júnior mutually agreed with Ceará to terminate his contract, foregoing the payment due, and signed for Bahia, where he remained until the end of the 2012 season.

In February 2013, Júnior signed with ABC, but an argument with successive coaches at the club led to him leaving in the summer.

After spending the second half of 2013 without a club, Júnior signed a three-month contract with Fortaleza side Tiradentes, at the end of which he signed a short-term contract with Bahia state side Juazeirense. He again signed a short-term contract with Juazeirense in March 2015, and scored the winning goal against Colo Colo that guaranteed the club a third-place finish in 2015 Campeonato Baiano, and access to 2016 Copa do Nordeste.

On 20 February 2016, Júnior signed for Bahia state side Jacuipense for the remaining duration of the 2016 Campeonato Baiano.
