= Mohamed Ramadan (footballer, born 1991) =

Lebanese footballer (born 1991)

Personal information
- Date of birth: 4 April 1991 (age 35)
- Place of birth: Malmö, Sweden
- Height: 1.82 m (6 ft 0 in)
- Position: Striker

Youth career
- Kvarnby IK

Senior career*
Years	Team	Apps	(Gls)
2009–2010	Kvarnby IK	26	(18)
2010–2013	Helsingborgs IF	1	(0)
2011	→ Ängelholms FF (loan)	5	(0)
2012	→ Trelleborgs FF (loan)	10	(1)
2013	→ HIF Akademi (loan)	18	(10)
2014	IFK Malmö	20	(22)
2015	Helsingborgs IF	1	(0)
2015	→ Landskrona BoIS (loan)	10	(3)
2016–2017	FC Rosengård	34	(29)
2017–2019	IFK Malmö	16	(13)
2019	Rosengård FF	0	(0)
2021	Heleneholms SK		(0)
Total		153	(106)

International career
2015	Lebanon	1	(0)
- * Club domestic league appearances and goals

Mohamed Ramadan (Arabic: محمد رمضان; born 4 April 1991) is a professional footballer who played as a striker. Born in Sweden, he played for the Lebanon national team.

== Club career ==
As a youngster, Ramadan played for Kvarnby IK until he joined Helsingborgs IF in July 2010. On 9 May 2011, he made his debut against Gefle IF coming off the bench in the 86th minute. He made his first continental appearance in a UEFA Europa League play-off game against Standard Liège in 2011. While at Helsingborg, Ramadan was loaned out to Ängelholms FF, Trelleborgs FF and HIF Akademi.

In early 2014, he signed for the Division 3 club IFK Malmö. He scored 22 goals in 20 games, which contributed greatly to IFK Malmö winning the 2014 Division 3 Södra. In February 2015, Ramadan returned to Helsingborg. In August 2015, he was loaned out to Division 1 club Landskrona BoIS.

In November 2015, Ramadan signed for FC Rosengård in the Division 2 Södra. In August 2017, Ramadan returned to Division 2 club IFK Malmö. In December 2019, Ramadan moved to Rosengård FF. Prior to the 2021 season, Ramadan joined Heleneholms SK.

== International career ==
Ramadan was called up for the Lebanon national team against Saudi Arabia on 14 October 2014, but did not play. He made his debut in a friendly against Iraq on 26 August 2015. Ramadan was unable to further represent the national team due to paperwork-related issues.

== See also ==
- List of Lebanon international footballers born outside Lebanon
