= Sjötulls BK =

Swedish football club

- Full name: Sjötulls Bollklubb
- Founded: 2002
- Ground: Träffen; Gävle; Sweden
- Chairman: Tore Åberg
- League: Division 3 Södra Norrland
- 2010: Division 4 Gästrikland, 1st (Promoted)
Home colours

Sjötulls BK is a Swedish football club located in Gävle in Gävleborg County.

== Background ==
Sjötulls Bollklubb were founded in 2002 and played their first season in the Swedish football league in 2003 in Division 6 Gästrikland where they finished in a creditable 7th place. Since their inaugural season the club have made good progress and have been promoted three times, the most recent success being winning Division 4 Gästrikland in 2010.

Since their foundation Sjötulls BK has participated mainly in the lower divisions of the Swedish football league system. The club currently plays in Division 3 Södra Norrland which is the fifth tier of Swedish football. They play their home matches at the Träffen in Gävle.

Sjötulls BK are affiliated to Gestriklands Fotbollförbund.

== Recent history ==
In recent seasons Sjötulls BK have competed in the following divisions:

2011 – Division III, Södra Norrland
2010 – Division IV, Gästrikland
2009 – Division IV, Gästrikland
2008 – Division IV, Gästrikland
2007 – Division V, Gästrikland
2006 – Division VI, Gästrikland
2005 – Division VI, Gästrikland
2004 – Division VI, Gästrikland
2003 – Division VI, Gästrikland

== Attendances ==
In recent seasons Sjötulls BK have had the following average attendances:

| Season | Average attendance | Division / Section | Level |
|---|---|---|---|
| 2008 | Not available | Div 4 Gästrikland | Tier 6 |
| 2009 | 74 | Div 4 Gästrikland | Tier 6 |
| 2010 | 66 | Div 4 Gästrikland | Tier 6 |

* Attendances are provided in the Publikliga sections of the Svenska Fotbollförbundet website.
