= Tuomo Turunen =

Finnish footballer (born 1987)

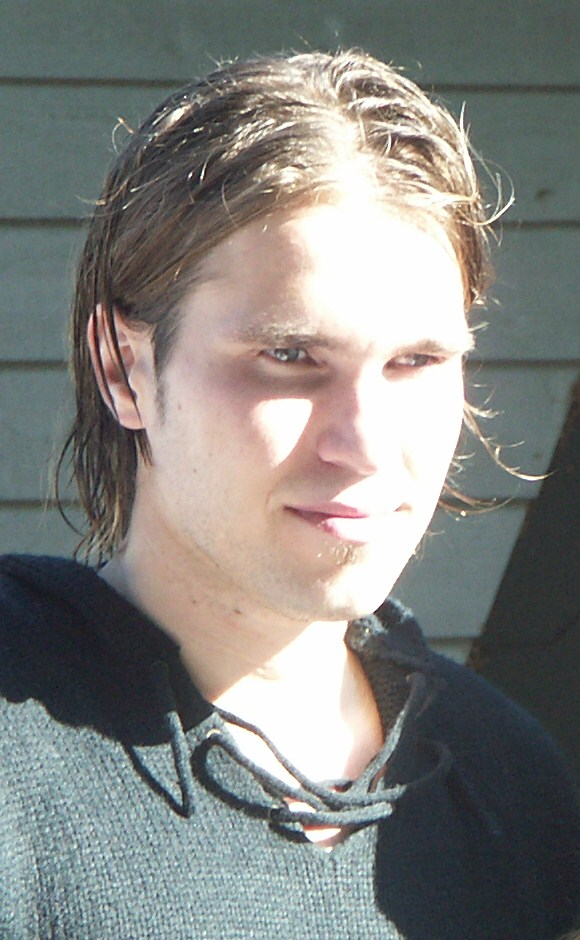

Personal information
- Date of birth: 30 August 1987 (age 39)
- Place of birth: Kuopio, Finland
- Height: 1.79 m (5 ft 10 in)
- Position: Defender

Youth career
- KTP

Senior career*
Years	Team	Apps	(Gls)
2003–2006	KooTeePee	37	(1)
2006–2009	Honka	60	(1)
2009–2010	IFK Göteborg	3	(0)
2010–2012	Trelleborg	43	(0)
2013	Inter Turku	7	(0)
2014	KTP	25	(0)
2015	Honka	25	(1)
2017	KTP	4	(0)
Total		204	(3)

International career
	Finland U-21	12	(1)
2009–2012	Finland	2	(0)
- * Club domestic league appearances and goals

Tuomo Turunen (born 30 August 1987) is a Finnish former footballer. He plays as a defender or midfielder. Before moving to Trelleborg, he played for FC Honka, FC KooTeePee and IFK Göteborg. He is also a member of Finland national under-21 football team. In 2008, he was selected as the best under-21 player in Finland.

In December 2008, Honka and Helsingborg IF were negotiating about selling Turunen to the Swedish club, but Turunen stayed in Espoo. In July 2009, he was sold to IFK Göteborg and signed for 3.5 years.

== Career statistics ==
As of 1 September 2024.

Appearances and goals by club, season and competition
Club	Season	League			Cup (Note: Includes Suomen Cup and Svenska Cupen)		League cup (Note: Includes Finnish League Cup)		Europe		Total	
Club	Season	Division	Apps	Goals	Apps	Goals	Apps	Goals	Apps	Goals	Apps	Goals
KooTeePee	2003	Veikkausliiga	1	0	–		–		–		1	0
KooTeePee	2004	Veikkausliiga	1	0	–		–		–		1	0
KooTeePee	2005	Veikkausliiga	16	1	–		–		–		16	1
KooTeePee	2006	Veikkausliiga	20	0	–		–		–		20	0
KooTeePee	Total		38	1	0	0	0	0	0	0	38	1
Honka	2007	Veikkausliiga	26	0	1	0	–		4 (Note: Appearances in UEFA Intertoto Cup)	0	31	0
Honka	2008	Veikkausliiga	23	1	2	0	–		6 (Note: Appearances in UEFA Cup)	0	31	1
Honka	2009	Veikkausliiga	11	1	0	0	3	0	–		14	1
Honka	Total		60	2	3	0	3	0	10	0	76	2
IFK Göteborg	2009	Allsvenskan	2	0	0	0	–		1 (Note: Appearance(s) in UEFA Europa League)	0	3	0
IFK Göteborg	2010	Allsvenskan	1	0	0	0	–		–		1	0
IFK Göteborg	Total		3	0	0	0	0	0	1	0	4	0
Trelleborg	2010	Allsvenskan	15	0	1	0	–		–		16	0
Trelleborg	2011	Allsvenskan	20	0	1	0	–		–		21	0
Trelleborg	2012	Superettan	8	0	0	0	–		–		8	0
Trelleborg	Total		43	0	2	0	0	0	0	0	45	0
Inter Turku	2013	Veikkausliiga	7	0	2	0	2	0	–		11	0
KTP	2014	Ykkönen	25	0	–		–		–		25	0
Honka	2015	Kakkonen	25	1	0	0	–		–		25	1
KTP	2017	Kakkonen	4	0	–		–		–		4	0
Career total			205	4	7	0	5	0	11	0	228	4

== Personal life ==
- Teemu Turunen is his elder brother.
