= Bertin Zé Ndille =

Cameroonian footballer

Personal information
- Full name: Bertin Samuel Zé Ndille
- Date of birth: 17 December 1988 (age 37)
- Place of birth: Yaoundé, Cameroon
- Height: 1.94 m (6 ft 4 in)
- Position: Defender

Senior career*
Years	Team	Apps	(Gls)
-2007	Canon Yaoundé		
2008-2010	Örebro SK	30	(0)
2012-2013	Tarbes Pyrénées Football	4	(1)
2016/2017	CS Chênois		
- * Club domestic league appearances and goals

Bertin Samuel Zé Ndille (born 17 December 1988 in Cameroon) is a Cameroonian retired footballer.

== Career ==
For the 2008 season, Ndille joined Örebro SK in Sweden as a springboard to a better league. Despite being wanted by Willem II, Basel, and Girondins de Bordeaux in the Dutch, Swiss, and French top flights for his performances with Örebro SK, he was playing in the French fourth division by 2012.
