= Mattias Nylund =

Swedish footballer (born 1980)

Personal information
- Full name: Mattias Jakob Nylund
- Date of birth: September 23, 1980 (age 46)
- Place of birth: Sundsvall, Sweden
- Height: 1.82 m (5 ft 11 1/2 in)
- Position: Defender

Senior career*
Years	Team	Apps	(Gls)
1998–2005	GIF Sundsvall	81	(0)
2000	→ SV Ried (loan)	2	(0)
2002	→ IFK Timrå (loan)	22	(0)
2003	→ AIK (loan)	1	(0)
2006–2007	Aalesunds FK	29	(1)
2008–2009	Trelleborgs FF	18	(0)
2010	GIF Sundsvall		

International career
2005	Sweden	1	(0)

Managerial career
- 2015: Egersund (assistant)
- 2017–2019: Sundsvalls DFF
- 2019: Timrå
- 2020–2023: Steinkjer
- * Club domestic league appearances and goals

Mattias Jakob Nylund (born 23 September 1980) is a Swedish footballer.

Nylund was a left full back. He played in Trelleborgs FF from the start of 2008, after a transfer from Aalesunds FK. Due to injuries he never got established at Trelleborg and left on a free transfer after the season of 2009. In 2010, he returned to his old club GIF Sundsvall to regain fitness after having done rehab for a cruciate ligament injury. After a few months of training he signed a contract with GIF Sundsvall lasting the rest of the 2010 season.

Nylund has played once for the Sweden men's national football team in 2005.
