= Daniel Sliper =

Swedish footballer

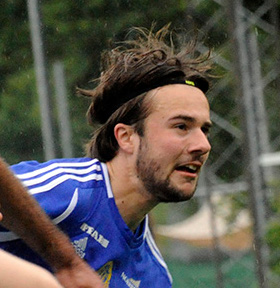

Personal information
- Full name: Mats Daniel Sliper
- Date of birth: 23 April 1987 (age 39)
- Place of birth: Sweden
- Height: 1.77 m (5 ft 10 in)
- Positions: Left midfielder; right midfielder

Youth career
- Svalövs BK
- 2003–2005: Malmö FF

Senior career*
Years	Team	Apps	(Gls)
2002	Svalövs BK	3	(0)
2003–2008	Malmö FF	1	(0)
2006	→ Falkenbergs FF (loan)	12	(0)
2007	→ Bunkeflo IF (loan)	23	(0)
2008	→ IF Limhamn Bunkeflo (loan)	24	(2)
2009–2015	GIF Sundsvall	159	(25)
2016	Assyriska FF	27	(8)
2017–2018	Örgryte IS	46	(7)
2019	IK Frej	9	(0)

International career
2002–2004	Sweden U17	21	(3)
2005–2006	Sweden U19	12	(4)
- * Club domestic league appearances and goals as of 7 July 2019 (UTC)

Daniel Sliper (born 23 April 1987) is a Swedish footballer who plays as a left or right midfielder.
