= Jesper Florén =

Swedish footballer (born 1990)

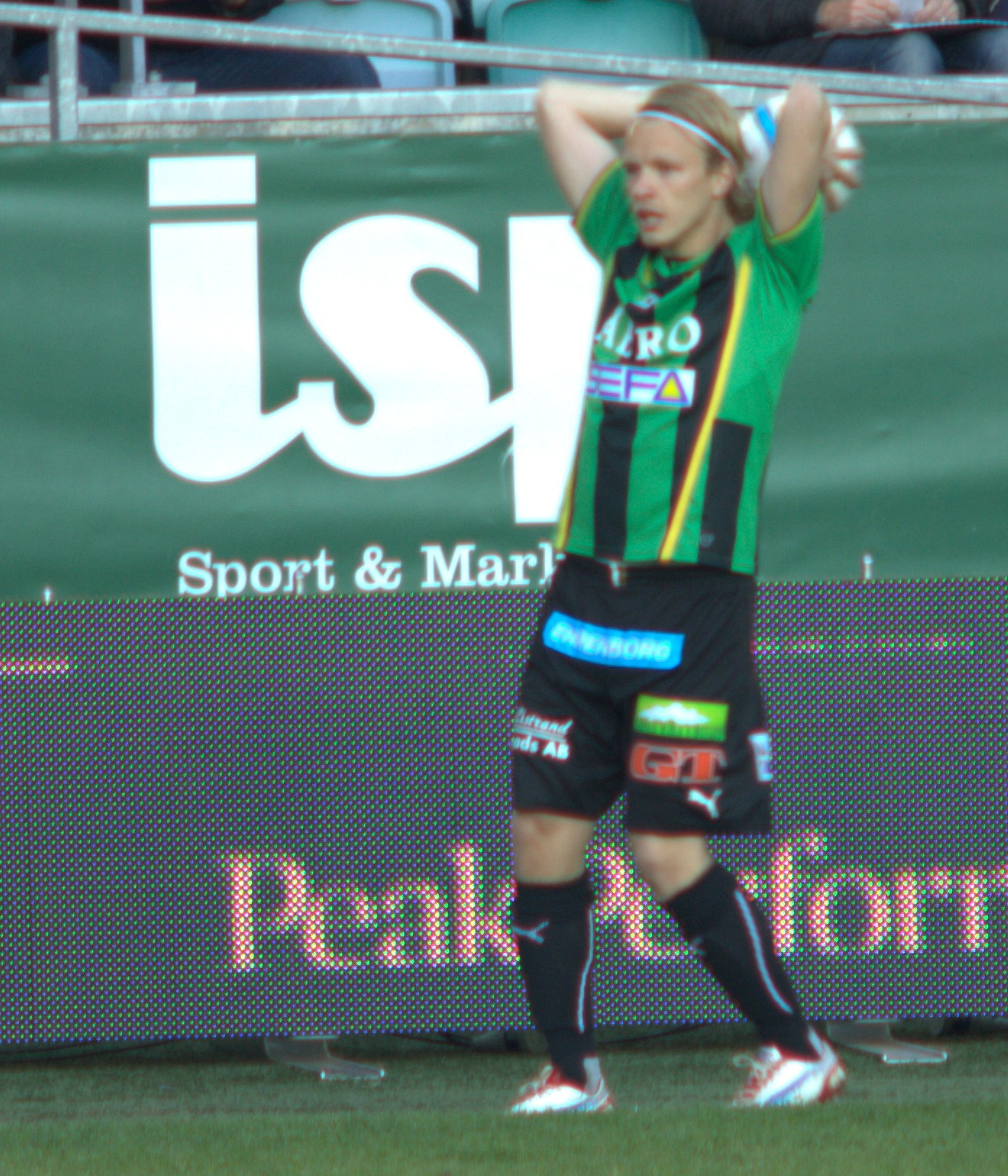
- Florén playing for GAIS

Personal information
- Date of birth: 11 September 1990 (age 36)
- Place of birth: Örebro, Sweden
- Height: 1.78 m (5 ft 10 in)
- Position: Right back

Youth career
- Rynninge
- Ajax

Senior career*
Years	Team	Apps	(Gls)
2009–2010	Elfsborg	4	(0)
2010–2013	GAIS	77	(1)
2014–2018	Gefle IF	128	(1)
2019–2020	Västerås SK	28	(0)
Total		237	(2)

International career
2005–2007	Sweden U17	15	(1)
2008–2009	Sweden U19	9	(1)
- * Club domestic league appearances and goals

Jesper Florén (born 11 September 1990) is a Swedish former professional footballer who played as a right back.

== Club career ==
Born in Örebro, Florén played youth football for local club Rynninge, as well as Dutch club Ajax. He played senior football in Sweden with Elfsborg, GAIS, Gefle, and Västerås SK.

== International career ==
Florén represented Sweden at under-17 and under-19 youth level.
