= Markus Thorbjörnsson =

Swedish footballer

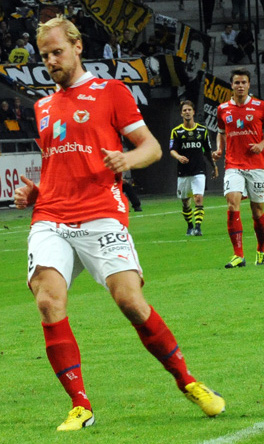

Personal information
- Full name: Markus Thorbjörnsson
- Date of birth: 1 October 1987 (age 39)
- Place of birth: Kungsbacka, Sweden
- Height: 1.87 m (6 ft 2 in)
- Position: Centre back

Youth career
- Kungsbacka BI

Senior career*
Years	Team	Apps	(Gls)
2005–2008	Falkenbergs FF	79	(1)
2009–2018	Kalmar FF	146	(3)
2010	→ Jönköpings Södra IF (loan)	12	(0)
2018	→ Dalkurd FF (loan)	11	(0)
2019	Dalkurd FF	27	(0)

International career
2005	Sweden U19	3	(0)
- * Club domestic league appearances and goals as of 23:58, 17 April 2020 (UTC)

Markus Thorbjörnsson (born 1 October 1987) is a Swedish former footballer who played as either a central or wide defender, finishing his career at Dalkurd FF. He spent the majority of his top flight career at Kalmar FF.

== Career ==
=== Dalkurd FF ===
In February 2019, he joined Dalkurd FF in Allsvenskan permanently, after having playing for the club on loan in the 2018 season. On 10 December 2019 it was confirmed, that Thorbjörnsson was one out of four players that would leave the club.
