= 2010 Halmstads BK season =

Halmstads BK
2010 season
- Chairman: Ingemar Broström
- Manager: Lars Jacobsson
- Allsvenskan: 12th
- Svenska Cupen: 3rd Round
- Top goalscorer: League: Anselmo (7); All: Anselmo (7)
- Highest home attendance: 8 368 vs IFK Göteborg (25 July)
- Lowest home attendance: 2 533 vs Gefle IF (28 April)

In 2010 Halmstads BK competed in the Allsvenskan and Svenska Cupen in Swedish football. They finished 12th in the league table out of 14 teams and reached the 3rd round of the cup.

== Squad ==
=== First-team squad ===
N	Pos.	Nat.	Name	Age	EU	Since	App	Goals	Ends	Transfer fee	Notes
1	GK	(Sweden)	K-J. Johnsson	35	EU	2009	4	0		Youth system	
2	DF	(Sweden)	P. Johnsson	47	EU	2001	125	6	2010		
3	DF	(Sweden)	Lundberg (captain)	43	EU	2009	13	1			
4	DF	(Sweden)	Jönsson	49	EU	1998	285	27			
5	DF	(Sweden)	Gustafson	38	EU	2008	2	0			
6	DF	(Sweden)	Rosén	51	EU	2006	87	7			
7	MF	(Germany)	Görlitz	38	EU	2008	43	6	2011		
8	MF	(Iceland)	Sævarsson	42	EU	2009	14	1			
9	FW	(Sweden)	Kujovic	37	EU	2007	54	12			
10	MF	(Kosovo)	Raskaj	36	EU	2007	60	1		Youth system	
11	MF	(Netherlands)	Prent	42	EU	2008	16	1			
12	MF	(Lithuania)	Žvirgždauskas	50	EU	2002	176	6			
14	FW	(Brazil)	Anselmo	45	Non-EU	2008	48	18	2010		
15	FW	(Sweden)	Sise	35	EU	2008	17	1			
16	DF	(Sweden)	Järdler	43	EU	2009	21	0			
17	MF	(United States)	Thomas	37	Non-EU	2010	0	0	June 2010		
17	MF	(Sweden)	Wrele	34	EU	2010	0	0		Youth system	
18	MF	(Sweden)	Olsson	37	EU	2008	41	6			
19	MF	(Sweden)	Salomonsson	36	EU	2008	28	0			
20	GK	(Sweden)	Malmqvist	38	EU	2010	0	0			
21	MF	(Sweden)	Bala	35	EU	2009	1	0		Youth system	
22	MF	(Sweden)	N. Johnsson	35	EU	2010	0	0		Youth system	
22	MF	(Sweden)	Thydell	32	EU	2010	0	0		Youth system	
23	DF	(Sweden)	Andersson	35	EU	2010	0	0		Youth system	
23	FW	(Sweden)	Baqaj	35	EU	2010	0	0	2011	on loan	
24	DF	(United States)	Miller	40	Non-EU	2010	0	0			
25	DF	(Sweden)	Magyar	34	EU	2010	0	0		Youth system	

- Last updated: 30 August 2010
- Ordered by starting 11, then appearances, then games started.

=== Youth squad ===
Youth squad players that can be called up to the main squad.

Note: Flags indicate national team as defined under FIFA eligibility rules; some limited exceptions apply. Players may hold more than one non-FIFA nationality.

No.	Pos.	Nation	Player
—	DF	SWE	Per Gulda
22	FW	SWE	Marcus Antonsson
23	DF	SWE	Viktor Ljung

== Transfers ==
=== In ===
No.	Pos.	Nat.	Name	Age	EU	Moving from	Type	Transfer window	Ends	Transfer fee	Source
20	GK	(Sweden)	Malmqvist	22	EU	Östers IF	Transferred	Winter	undisclosed	Undisclosed	Halmstads BK
23	MF	(Sweden)	Andersson	19	EU	Halmstads BK	Youth squad	Winter	undisclosed		Halmstads BK
22	DF	(Sweden)	Johnsson	19	EU	Halmstads BK	Youth squad	Winter	undisclosed		Halmstads BK
21	MF	(Kosovo)	Bala	19	EU	Halmstads BK	Youth squad	Winter	undisclosed		Halmstads BK
24	DF	(United States)	Miller	25	Non-EU	Ljungskile SK	Transferred	Winter	undisclosed	Undisclosed	Halmstads BK
17	MF	(United States)	Thomas	21	Non-EU	San Jose Earthquakes (United States)	Transferred	Winter	June 2010	Undisclosed	Halmstads BK
17	MF	(Sweden)	Wrele	18	EU	Halmstads BK	Youth squad	Summer	undisclosed		Halmstads BK
23	FW	(Sweden)	Baqaj	19	EU	AlbinoLeffe (Italy)	Loan	Summer	summer 2011	Loan	Halmstads BK
22	MF	(Sweden)	Thydell	17	EU	Halmstads BK	Youth squad	Winter	undisclosed		Halmstads BK

=== Out ===
No.	Pos.	Nat.	Name	Age	EU	Moving to	Type	Transfer window	Transfer fee	Source
	MF	(Finland)	Sparv	22	EU	Groningen (Netherlands)	Contract ended	Winter	Free	FC Groningen
	MF	(Chad)	Mahamat	21	Non-EU	Espanyol (Spain)	Return from loan	Winter		Halmstads BK
	GK	(Finland)	Bahne	30	EU		Contract ended	Winter		Hallandsposten
	FW	(Sweden)	Kujovic	23	EU		Contract ended	Winter		Halmstads BK
	DF	(Sweden)	Jensen	30	EU	Falkenbergs FF	Contract ended	Winter	Free	Halmstads BK
	MF	(Sweden)	Johansson	29	EU	Örgryte IS	Transferred	Winter	n/a	Örgryte IS
17	MF	(United States)	Thomas	21	Non-EU		Contract ended	Summer	Free	Halmstads BK
23	DF	(Sweden)	Andersson	20	EU	Ängelholms FF	Loaned out rest of the season	Summer	Free	Halmstads BK

Last updated: 11 January

== Appearances and goals ==
=== Overall statistic ===
Updated 4 October 2010

No.	Pos	Nat	Player	Total		Allsvenskan		Svenska Cupen	
No.	Pos	Nat	Player	Apps	Goals	Apps	Goals	Apps	Goals
1	GK	(Sweden) SWE	Karl-Johan Johnsson	10	0	9	0	1	0
1	GK	(Sweden) SWE	Viktor Kristiansson	0	0	0	0	0	0
2	DF	(Sweden) SWE	Per Johansson	11	0	11	0	0	0
3	DF	(Sweden) SWE	Johnny Lundberg	23	2	23	2	0	0
4	DF	(Sweden) SWE	Tommy Jönsson	20	2	19	2	1	0
5	DF	(Sweden) SWE	Markus Gustafson	1	0	1	0	0	0
6	DF	(Sweden) SWE	Mikael Rosén	26	1	26	1	0	0
7	MF	(Germany) GER	Michael Görlitz	31	2	30	2	1	0
8	FW	(Iceland) ISL	Jonas Gudni Saevarsson	17	3	16	3	1	0
9	FW	(Sweden) SWE	Emir Kujović	22	2	21	2	1	0
10	MF	(Kosovo) KOS	Anel Raskaj	27	1	26	1	1	0
11	MF	(Netherlands) NED	Alexander Prent	17	1	16	1	1	0
12	DF	(Lithuania) LTU	Tomas Žvirgždauskas	18	0	18	0	0	0
13	MF	(Sweden) SWE	Kristoffer Thydell	7	0	7	0	0	0
14	FW	(Brazil) BRA	Anselmo	23	7	22	7	1	0
15	MF	(Sweden) SWE	Joe Sise	23	5	22	5	1	0
16	DF	(Sweden) SWE	Christian Järdler	16	0	15	0	1	0
17	MF	(United States) USA	Michael Thomas	5	0	5	0	0	0
17	MF	(Sweden) SWE	Joakim Wrele	2	0	1	0	1	0
18	MF	(Sweden) SWE	Marcus Olsson	31	4	30	4	1	0
19	MF	(Sweden) SWE	Emil Salomonsson	31	1	30	1	1	0
20	GK	(Sweden) SWE	Robin Malmqvist	24	0	24	0	0	0
21	MF	(Kosovo) KOS	Kujtim Bala	0	0	0	0	0	0
22	MF	(Sweden) SWE	Niclas Johnsson	0	0	0	0	0	0
22	FW	(Sweden) SWE	Marcus Antonsson	1	0	1	0	0	0
23	DF	(Sweden) SWE	Pehr Andersson	0	0	0	0	0	0
23	DF	(Sweden) SWE	Viktor Ljung	1	0	1	0	0	0
23	FW	(Sweden) SWE	Guri Baqaj	5	0	5	0	0	0
24	DF	(United States) USA	Ryan Miller	27	0	26	0	1	0
25	DF	(Sweden) SWE	Richard Magyar	4	0	3	0	1	0

== Matches ==
=== Pre-Season/Friendly ===
23 January 2010 Match 1	(Sweden) Halmstads BK	1–1	FC Nordsjælland (Denmark)	Sannarps IP, Halmstad
12:00 CET	Rosén 55'; Raskaj (red card) 86'	(report) (in Swedish)	72' Bille	Attendance: 191; Referee: Sven-Martin Åkesson

30 January 2010 Match 2	(Sweden) Helsingborgs IF	2–2	Halmstads BK (Sweden)	Sparbanksvallen, Bjärnum
13:00 CET	Lantz 57'; Jönsson 81'	(report) (in Swedish)	30' Sise; (yellow card) 54' (yellow-red card) 67' Zvirgzdauskas; 90' Kujovic	Attendance: 620; Referee: Martin Ingvarsson

6 February 2010 Match 3	(Norway) Stabæk	3–2	Halmstads BK (Sweden)	Telenor Arena, Oslo
14:00 CET	Eiriksson 22'; Gromstad 33'; Palmason 57'	(report) (in Swedish)	16' Salomonsson; 49' Sise	Attendance: 602; Referee: Tom Henning Øvrebø

13 February 2010 Match 4	(Sweden) Halmstads BK	2–0	Trelleborgs FF (Sweden)	Sannarps IP, Halmstad
13:00 CET	Görlitz 40'; Kujovic 89'	(report) (in Swedish)		Referee: Martin Olsson

16 February 2010 Match 5	(Sweden) Ängelholms FF	1–3	Halmstads BK (Sweden)	Valhall Park, Ängelholm
18:00 CET	Bennhage 37'	(report) (in Swedish)	(yellow card) 33' Thomas; 38' Kujovic; 73' (pen.), 80' Prent	Attendance: 100; Referee: Antti Kanerva

20 February 2010 Match 6	(Sweden) Halmstads BK	Cancelled	FC Trollhättan (Sweden)	Sannarps IP, Halmstad
13:00 CET

24 February 2010 Match 7	(Spain) Espanyol B	1–8	Halmstads BK (Sweden)	Barcelona
12:00 CET	N/A 71'	(report) (in Swedish)	3', 71' Kujovic; 9' Olsson; 28' Görlitz; 38' (og.) N/A; 47' Sise; 82', 88' Anselmo

4 March 2010 Match 8	(Spain) Espanyol	2–0	Halmstads BK (Sweden)	Barcelona
11:00 CET	Tamudo 35'; N/A 75'	(report) (in Swedish)

7 March 2010 Match 9	(Sweden) Halmstads BK	0–3	Kalmar FF (Sweden)	Sannarps IP, Halmstad
14:00 CET	Sise (yellow card); Lundberg (red card)	(report) (in Swedish)	35' Dauda; 38' Mendes; 59' (pen.) Sobralense	Attendance: 388; Referee: Martin Olsson

10 June 2010 Match 10	(Sweden) Halmstads BK	4–4	Kosovo	Örjans Vall, Halmstad
19:00 CET	Anselmo 22', 48'; Salomonsson 82', 86'	(report) (in Swedish)	4' Rama; 35' Gashi; 39' Bektashi; 71' Bala	Attendance: 863; Referee: Mattias Nyman

15 June 2010 Match 11	(Sweden) Halmstads BK	1–3	Mjällby AIF (Sweden)	Örjans Vall, Halmstad
19:00 CET	Salomonsson 87'; Miller (yellow card); Wrele (yellow card)	(report) (in Swedish)	43', 59' El Kabir; 35' Robledo	Attendance: 115; Referee: Nermin Cisic

30 June 2010 Match 12	(Sweden) Halmstads BK	1–1	FC Nordsjælland (Denmark)	Örjans Vall, Halmstad
13:00 CET	Rosén 34'	(report) (in Swedish)	39' Fetai	Attendance: 200; Referee: Antti Kanerva

10 July 2010 Match 13	(Denmark) Esbjerg fB	0–1	Halmstads BK (Sweden)	Örjans Vall, Halmstad
13:00 CET		(report) (in Swedish)	77' Olsson; (yellow card) Rosén

22 July 2010 Match 14	(Sweden) Halmstads BK	2–2	Fulham F.C. (England)	Örjans Vall, Halmstad
20:00 CET	Sise 25', 30'; Jönsson (yellow card) 61'	(report) (in Swedish)	9', 58' Gera	Attendance: 1885; Referee: Martin Olsson

=== Allsvenskan ===
14 March 2010 Match 1	Halmstads BK	0–0	Trelleborgs FF	Örjans Vall, Halmstad
14:00 CET	Rosén (yellow card) 50'	(report) (in Swedish)	(yellow card) 40' Andersson; (yellow card) 72' Adelstam; (yellow card) 74' Persson	Attendance: 3 347; Referee: Magnus Ahlsén

22 March 2010 Match 2	IF Elfsborg	6–0	Halmstads BK	Borås Arena, Borås
19:00 CET	Larsson 13', 28'; Keene 59', 65'; Berglund 87'; Avdic 89'	(report) (in Swedish)	(yellow card) 76' Prent	Attendance: 7 398; Referee: Stefan Johannesson

28 March 2010 Match 3	Halmstads BK	4–0	Åtvidabergs FF	Örjans Vall, Halmstad
15:00 CEST	Raskaj 7'; Järdler (yellow card) 45'; Salomonsson 48'; Lundberg (yellow card) 62'; Prent 82'; Lundberg 92'	(report) (in Swedish)	(yellow card) 34' Hallingström; (yellow card) 39' da Silva; (yellow card) 60' Niklasson	Attendance: 2 878; Referee: Tobias Mattsson

6 April 2010 Match 4	Malmö FF	1–1	Halmstads BK	Swedbank Stadion, Malmö
19:00 CEST	Figueiredo (yellow card) 29'; Åhman-Persson 71'; Ofere (yellow card) 82'	(report) (in Swedish)	(yellow card) 45' Sise; 48' Görlitz; (yellow card) 83' Thomas	Attendance: 11 671; Referee: Martin Hansson

11 April 2010 Match 5	Halmstads BK	1–2	Mjällby AIF	Örjans Vall, Halmstad
14:00 CEST	Sise 16'	(report) (in Swedish)	28' Nicklasson; 43' Löfquist; (yellow card) 69' Svensson; (yellow card) 83' El Kabir	Attendance: 3 876; Referee: Jonas Eriksson

14 April 2010 Match 6	AIK	0–1	Halmstads BK	Råsunda, Stockholm
14:00 CEST	Karlsson (yellow card) 39'; Johnson (yellow card) 65'; Djordjic (yellow card) 89'	(report) (in Swedish)	(yellow card) 21' Žvirgždauskas; 89' Sævarsson	Attendance: 9 588; Referee: Markus Strömbergsson

18 April 2010 Match 7	Halmstads BK	3–0	GAIS	Örjans Vall, Halmstad
15:00 CEST	Sævarsson (yellow card) 30'; Anselmo 42' (pen.); Olsson 80'; Olsson (yellow card) 80'; Kujović 90'	(report) (in Swedish)	(yellow card) 86' Celik	Attendance: 3 541; Referee: Martin Ingvarsson

25 April 2010 Match 8	Örebro SK	3–0	Halmstads BK	Behrn Arena, Örebro
17:00 CEST	Kihlberg 2'; Olsen 33'; Bedoya (yellow card) 61'; Paulinho 82'	(report) (in Swedish)		Attendance: 6 397; Referee: Johan Hamlin

28 April 2010 Match 9	Halmstads BK	1–0	Gefle IF	Örjans Vall, Halmstad
19:00 CEST	Anselmo 24'	(report) (in Swedish)		Attendance: 2 533; Referee: Martin Hansson

2 May 2010 Match 10	IF Brommapojkarna	1–0	Halmstads BK	Grimsta IP, Stockholm
17:00 CEST	Petrovic (yellow card) 9'; Žvirgždauskas 14' (o.g.); Björkström (yellow card) 45'	(report) (in Swedish)	(yellow card) 60' Žvirgždauskas	Attendance: 1 869; Referee: Sven-Martin Åkesson

5 May 2010 Match 11	Kalmar FF	1–0	Halmstads BK	Fredriksskans, Kalmar
19:00 CEST	Dauda 80'	(report) (in Swedish)	(yellow card) 17' Prent	Attendance: 3 287; Referee: Magnus Ahlsén

9 May 2010 Match 12	Halmstads BK	1–2	BK Häcken	Örjans Vall, Halmstad
17:00 CEST	Lundberg 2'; Sævarsson (yellow card) 18'; Magyar (yellow card) 34'	(report) (in Swedish)	1', 14' Henriksson; (yellow card) 13' Friberg	Attendance: 3 139; Referee: Johan Hamlin

22 May 2010 Match 13	Helsingborgs IF	2–1	Halmstads BK	Olympia, Helsingborg
16:00 CEST	Gashi 7', 67'; Holgersson (yellow card) 30'	(report) (in Swedish)	(yellow card) 19' Raskaj; 31' Jönsson; (yellow card) 64' P. Johansson	Attendance: 11 141; Referee: Martin Ingvarsson

15 May 2010 Match 14	Halmstads BK	2–0	Djurgårdens IF	Örjans Vall, Halmstad
16:00 CEST	Anselmo (yellow card) 9' (goal) 11', 88'; Sise (yellow card) 82'	(report) (in Swedish)	(yellow card) 13' Ceesay	Attendance: 4 147; Referee: Markus Strömbergsson

17 July 2010 Match 15	IFK Göteborg	3–0	Halmstads BK	Gamla Ullevi, Gothenburg
16:00 CEST	Hysén 11'; Svensson 66'; Sigurdsson 69'	(report) (in Swedish)	(yellow card) 66' Raskaj	Attendance: 10 426; Referee: Daniel Stålhammar

25 July 2010 Match 16	Halmstads BK	1–0	IFK Göteborg	Örjans Vall, Halmstad
16:30 CEST	Rosén 41'; Zvirgzdauskas (yellow card) 67'	(report) (in Swedish)	(yellow card) 9' Eriksson	Attendance: 8 368; Referee: Stefan Johannesson

2 August 2010 Match 17	Trelleborgs FF	1–0	Halmstads BK	Vångavallen, Trelleborg
19:00 CEST	Adelstam 78' (yellow card) 78'	(report) (in Swedish)	(yellow card) 90' Olsson	Attendance: 2 795; Referee: Andreas Ekberg

8 August 2010 Match 18	Halmstads BK	1–3	IF Elfsborg	Örjans Vall, Halmstad
18:00 CEST	Kujović 78'; Žvirgždauskas (yellow card) 78'	(report) (in Swedish)	4', 45+4' Avdić; 8' (yellow card) 26' Ishizaki; (red card) 40' Andersson; (yellow card) 74' Klarström	Attendance: 4 402; Referee: Michael Lerjéus

16 August 2010 Match 19	Åtvidabergs FF	1–1	Halmstads BK	Kopparvallen, Åtvidaberg
19:00 CEST	da Silva (yellow card) 34'; Roiha 45'	(report) (in Swedish)	(yellow card) 23' Miller; 31' Sævarsson	Attendance: 2 425; Referee: Martin Hansson

23 August 2010 Match 20	Halmstads BK	0–2	Malmö FF	Örjans Vall, Halmstad
19:00 CEST	Sævarsson (yellow card) 41'	(report) (in Swedish)	42', 66' Mehmeti; (yellow card) 45' Durmaz; (yellow card) 50' Figueiredo; (yellow card) 79' Molins	Attendance: 5 502; Referee: Markus Strömbergsson

29 August 2010 Match 21	Halmstads BK	2–1	Kalmar FF	Örjans Vall, Halmstad
18:00 CEST	Olsson 37', 51'; Miller (yellow card) 44'; Žvirgždauskas (yellow card) 54'	(report) (in Swedish)	84' Mendes	Attendance: 3 309; Referee: Tobias Mattsson

10 September 2010 Match 22	BK Häcken	2–0	Halmstads BK	Rambergsvallen, Gothenburg
19:00 CEST	Wahlström (yellow card) 13'; Karlsson 33'; Makondele 40'; Arkivuo (yellow card) 48'	(report) (in Swedish)		Attendance: 1 725; Referee: Magnus Ahlsén

19 September 2010 Match 23	Halmstads BK	1–1	Örebro SK	Örjans Vall, Halmstad
16:30 CEST	Görlitz (yellow card) 33'; Sise (yellow card) 40'; Olsson 45+1'; Žvirgždauskas (red card) 86'	(report) (in Swedish)	(yellow card) 31' (yellow-red card) 90+3' Wowoah; 37' P. Johansson; (yellow card) 58' Porokara; (yellow card) 75' Bedoya	Attendance: 3 527; Referee: Martin Ingvarsson

22 September 2010 Match 24	GAIS	1–1	Halmstads BK	Gamla Ullevi, Gothenburg
16:30 CEST	Andersson 21' (yellow card) 88'; Jónasson (yellow card) 68'; Tamandi (yellow card) 74'	(report) (in Swedish)	(yellow card) 88' Sævarsson; (yellow card) 88' Salomonsson; (yellow card) 58' Lundberg; 21' Jönsson	Attendance: 3 298; Referee: Markus Strömbergsson

27 September 2010 Match 25	Gefle IF	1–2	Halmstads BK	Strömvallen, Gävle
19:00 CEST	Chibsah 9'; Lantto (yellow card) 23'	(report) (in Swedish)	(yellow card) 26' Salomonsson; 30', 72' Sise	Attendance: 3 395; Referee: Johan Hamlin

3 October 2010 Match 26	Halmstads BK	2–0	IF Brommapojkarna	Örjans Vall, Halmstad
15:00 CEST	Sise 2'; Sævarsson 37'; Rosén (yellow card) 69'	(report) (in Swedish)	(yellow card) 19' Stefanidis	Attendance: 3 713; Referee: Michael Lerjéus

17 October 2010 Match 27	Mjällby AIF	2–0	Halmstads BK	Strandvallen, Mjällby
15:00 CEST	El Kabir 67'; Löfquist (yellow card) 69' (goal) 90+4'; Grahn (yellow card) 83'	(report) (in Swedish)	(yellow card) 47' Žvirgždauskas; (yellow card) 65' Sise; (yellow card) 71' Sævarsson; (yellow card) 90' Jönsson	Attendance: 2 820; Referee: Sven-Martin Åkesson

25 October 2010 Match 28	Halmstads BK	1–2	AIK	Örjans Vall, Halmstad
19:00 CEST	Sise (yellow card) 21'; Anselmo 88'	(report) (in Swedish)	64' Lundberg; 69' (pen.) Pavey; (yellow card) 88' Turina	Attendance: 4 172; Referee: Martin Hansson

31 October 2010 Match 29	Halmstads BK	2–4	Helsingborgs IF	Örjans Vall, Halmstad
16:30 CET	Thydell (yellow card) 30'; Raskaj (yellow card) 70'; Anselmo 83', 88' (pen.)	(report) (in Swedish)	18', 66' Jönsson; 23' Mahlangu; 64' (pen.) Gerndt; (yellow card) 82' Nilsson	Attendance: 7 139; Referee: N/A

7 November 2010 Match 30	Djurgårdens IF	0–2	Halmstads BK	Stockholms Stadion, Stockholm
16:30 CET		(report) (in Swedish)	42' Görlitz; 66' Sise	Attendance: 5 017; Referee: Martin Strömbergsson

=== Svenska cupen ===
18 May 2010 Third round	Ängelholms FF	1–0	Halmstads BK	Ängelholms IP, Ängelholm
19:00 CEST	Westerblad 33'	(report) (in Swedish)	(yellow card) 40' Järdler; (yellow card) 79' Jönsson	Attendance: 603; Referee: Daniel Stålhammar

== Competitions ==
=== Allsvenskan ===
==== Standings ====
Pos	Team	Pld	W	D	L	GF	GA	GD	Pts	Qualification or relegation
10	Djurgårdens IF	30	11	7	12	35	42	−7	40	
11	AIK	30	10	5	15	29	36	−7	35	
12	Halmstads BK	30	10	5	15	31	42	−11	35	
13	GAIS	30	8	8	14	24	35	−11	32	
14	Gefle IF (O)	30	7	8	15	33	46	−13	29	Qualification to Relegation play-offs

Source: svenskfotboll.se (in Swedish)
Rules for classification: 1) points; 2) goal difference; 3) number of goals scored.
(O) Play-off winners

==== Results summary ====
Overall								Home						Away					
Pld	W	D	L	GF	GA	GD	Pts	W	D	L	GF	GA	GD	W	D	L	GF	GA	GD
30	10	5	15	31	42	−11	35	7	2	6	22	17	+5	3	3	9	9	25	−16

Last updated: 7 November 2010.
Source: SvFF.se (in Swedish)

==== Results by round ====
Round	1	2	3	4	5	6	7	8	9	10	11	12	13	14	15	16	17	18	19	20	21	22	23	24	25	26	27	28	29	30
Ground	H	A	H	A	H	A	H	A	H	A	A	H	A	H^{1}	A	H	A	H	A	H	H	A	H	A	A	H	A	H	H	A
Result	D	L	W	D	L	W	W	L	W	L	L	L	L	W	L	W	L	L	D	L	W	L	D	D	W	W	L	L	L	W
Position	8	14	8	9	10	9	5	8	7	9	10	12	8	8	11	9	13	13	14	14	12	14	13	13	11	11	12	12	13	12

Updated to match(es) played on 7 November 2010. Source: SvFF.se (in Swedish)
A = Away; H = Home; W = Win; D = Draw; L = Loss
Notes: ^1 : the 14 round was played on 15 May, while 13 round was played on 22 May.

== Season statistics ==
=== Pre-season ===
Name	Matches	Goals
(Sweden) Emir Kujovic	8	5
(Sweden) Joe Sise	11	5
(Brazil) Anselmo	7	4
(Sweden) Emil Salomonsson	9	4
(Netherlands) Alexander Prent	8	2
(Germany) Michael Görlitz	8	2
(Sweden) Marcus Olsson	7	2
(Sweden) Mikael Rosén	9	2

Name	Yellow card	Yellow card Red card	Red card
(Lithuania) Tomas Žvirgždauskas	1	1	0
(Kosovo) Anel Raskaj	0	0	1
(Sweden) Johnny Lundberg	0	0	1
(United States) Michael Thomas	1	0	0
(Sweden) Joe Sise	1	0	0
(United States) Ryan Miller	1	0	0
(Sweden) Joakim Wrele	1	0	0
(Sweden) Mikael Rosén	1	0	0
(Sweden) Tommy Jönsson	1	0	0

= Number of bookings
= Number of sending offs after a second yellow card
= Number of sending offs by a direct red card

=== Allsvenskan ===
Name	Matches	Goals
(Brazil) Anselmo	22	7
(Sweden) Joe Sise	22	5
(Sweden) Marcus Olsson	30	4
(Iceland) Jónas Sævarsson	16	3
(Sweden) Johnny Lundberg	23	2
(Sweden) Emir Kujović	21	2
(Sweden) Tommy Jönsson	19	2
(Germany) Michael Görlitz	30	2
(Kosovo) Anel Raskaj	26	1
(Sweden) Emil Salomonsson	30	1
(Netherlands) Alexander Prent	16	1
(Sweden) Mikael Rosén	26	1

Name	Yellow card	Yellow card Red card	Red card
(Lithuania) Tomas Žvirgždauskas	6	0	1
(Iceland) Jónas Sævarsson	5	0	0
(Sweden) Joe Sise	5	0	0
(Kosovo) Anel Raskaj	3	0	0
(Netherlands) Alexander Prent	2	0	0
(Sweden) Marcus Olsson	2	0	0
(Sweden) Johnny Lundberg	2	0	0
(United States) Ryan Miller	2	0	0
(Sweden) Emil Salomonsson	2	0	0
(Sweden) Mikael Rosén	2	0	0
(Sweden) Christian Järdler	1	0	0
(United States) Michael Thomas	1	0	0
(Sweden) Richard Magyar	1	0	0
(Brazil) Anselmo	1	0	0
(Sweden) Per Johansson	1	0	0
(Germany) Michael Görlitz	1	0	0
(Sweden) Tommy Jönsson	1	0	0
(Sweden) Kristoffer Thydell	1	0	0

= Number of bookings
= Number of sending offs after a second yellow card
= Number of sending offs by a direct red card

=== Svenska cupen ===
Name	Matches	Goals

Name	Yellow card	Yellow card Red card	Red card
(Sweden) Christian Järdler	1	0	0
(Sweden) Tommy Jönsson	1	0	0

= Number of bookings
= Number of sending offs after a second yellow card
= Number of sending offs by a direct red card

=== Overall ===
Only league and cup matches

Name	Matches	Goals
(Brazil) Anselmo	23	7
(Sweden) Joe Sise	23	5
(Sweden) Marcus Olsson	31	4
(Iceland) Jónas Sævarsson	17	3
(Sweden) Johnny Lundberg	23	2
(Sweden) Emir Kujović	22	2
(Sweden) Tommy Jönsson	20	2
(Germany) Michael Görlitz	30	2
(Kosovo) Anel Raskaj	27	1
(Sweden) Emil Salomonsson	31	1
(Netherlands) Alexander Prent	17	1
(Sweden) Mikael Rosén	26	1

Name	Yellow card	Yellow card Red card	Red card
(Lithuania) Tomas Žvirgždauskas	6	0	1
(Iceland) Jónas Sævarsson	5	0	0
(Sweden) Joe Sise	5	0	0
(Kosovo) Anel Raskaj	3	0	0
(Netherlands) Alexander Prent	2	0	0
(Sweden) Marcus Olsson	2	0	0
(Sweden) Johnny Lundberg	2	0	0
(United States) Ryan Miller	2	0	0
(Sweden) Emil Salomonsson	2	0	0
(Sweden) Mikael Rosén	2	0	0
(Sweden) Christian Järdler	2	0	0
(Sweden) Tommy Jönsson	2	0	0
(United States) Michael Thomas	1	0	0
(Sweden) Richard Magyar	1	0	0
(Brazil) Anselmo	1	0	0
(Sweden) Per Johansson	1	0	0
(Germany) Michael Görlitz	1	0	0
(Sweden) Kristoffer Thydell	1	0	0

= Number of bookings
= Number of sending offs after a second yellow card
= Number of sending offs by a direct red card

== International players ==
Does only contain players that represent the senior squad during the 2010 season.

=== Friendly ===
Date	Nation	Player	Opponents	Mins.	Goals
17 February 2010	Kosovo	Anel Raskaj	Albania	90	0
10 June 2010	Kosovo	Anel Raskaj	(Sweden) Halmstads BK	90	0
10 June 2010	Kosovo	Kujtim Bala	(Sweden) Halmstads BK	30	1
9 October 2010	Kosovo	Anel Raskaj	(Switzerland) Neuchâtel Xamax	90	0
9 October 2010	Kosovo	Kujtim Bala	(Switzerland) Neuchâtel Xamax	14	0

=== Youth ===
Date	Nation	Player	Opponents	Mins.	Goals
2 March 2010	Sweden U-19	Richard Magyar	(Czech Republic) Czech U-19	45	0
7 October 2010	Sweden U-19	Richard Magyar	Austria U-19	45	0
20 July 2010	Sweden U-17	Kristoffer Thydell	Norway U-17	90	0
22 July 2010	Sweden U-17	Kristoffer Thydell	Iceland U-17	15	0
24 July 2010	Sweden U-17	Kristoffer Thydell	Wales U-17	62	0

=== U 21 ===
Date	Nation	Player	Opponents	Mins.	Goals
2 March 2010	Sweden	Emir Kujovic	Portugal U-21	68	0
2 March 2010	Sweden	Emil Salomonsson	Portugal U-21	90	0
11 August 2010	Sweden	Emil Salomonsson	Scotland U-21	85	0
11 August 2010	Sweden	Joe Sise	Scotland U-21	45	0
3 September 2010	Sweden	Emil Salomonsson	Israel U-21	90	0
7 September 2010	Sweden	Emil Salomonsson	Bulgaria U-21	90	0
11 October 2010	Sweden	Joe Sise	Switzerland U-21	26	0

=== Senior ===
Notes

- Jónas Guðni Sævarsson was called up to Icelands national team against both Cyprus and Portugal, he spent both matches on the substitution bench.
