= 2011 Halmstads BK season =

Halmstads BK
2011 season
- Chairman: (Sweden) Göran Johansson
- Manager: (Sweden) Jens Gustafsson
- Allsvenskan: 16
- Svenska Cupen: 4th Round
- Top goalscorer: League: Joe Sise (5); All: Joe Sise (5)
- Highest home attendance: 6 834 vs Helsingborgs IF (27 June)
- Lowest home attendance: 1 874 vs Djurgårdens IF (27 October)

In 2011 Halmstads BK will compete in Allsvenskan and Svenska Cupen.

== 2011 season squad ==
N	Pos.	Nat.	Name	Age	EU	Since	App	Goals	Ends	Transfer fee	Notes
1	GK	(Sweden)	K-J. Johnsson	35	EU	2009	13	0		Youth system	
2	DF	(Sweden)	Ljung	34	EU	2011	1				
3	DF	(Sweden)	Lundberg (captain)	43	EU	2009	36	3			
4	DF	(United States)	Miller	40	Non-EU	2010	26	0			
5	DF	(Sweden)	Gustafson	37	EU	2008	3	0			
6	DF	(Sweden)	Rosén	50	EU	2006	137	8	2011		
7	MF	(Germany)	Görlitz	38	EU	2008	73	8	2011		
8	MF	(Iceland)	Sævarsson	41	EU	2009	30	4			
9	FW	(Sweden)	Johansson	33	EU	2011	1	0	2011	loan	
10	MF	(Kosovo)	Raskaj	35	EU	2007	86	2		Youth system	
11	FW	(Sweden)	Antonsson	33	EU	2011	1	0		Youth system	
12	MF	(Lithuania)	Žvirgždauskas	50	EU	2002	194	6	2011		
13	MF	(Sweden)	Thydell	32	EU	2010	7	0		Youth system	
15	FW	(Sweden)	Sise	35	EU	2008	39	6			
16	DF	(Sweden)	Järdler	42	EU	2009	36	0			
18	MF	(Sweden)	Olsson	36	EU	2008	71	10			
19	MF	(Sweden)	Salomonsson	36	EU	2008	59	1			
21	MF	(Kosovo)	Bala	34	EU	2009	1	0		Youth system	
22	MF	(Sweden)	N. Johnsson	34	EU	2010	0	0		Youth system	
23	FW	(Sweden)	Maholli	32	EU	2011	0	0		Youth system	
24	MF	(Sweden)	Rexhepi	31	EU	2011	0	0		Youth system	
25	DF	(Sweden)	Magyar	34	EU	2010	3	0		Youth system	
26	MF	(Sweden)	Wrele	34	EU	2010	1	0		Youth system	
Former 2011 season players
23	FW	(Sweden)	Baqaj	34	EU	2010	4	0	2011	loan	
20	GK	(Spain)	Perez	40	EU	2011	0	0			
14	MF	(Spain)	Diaz	46	EU	2011	0	0			
20	GK	(Sweden)	Malmqvist	37	EU	2010	23	0			Currently on loan to Tromsø
11	MF	(Spain)	Raúl	35	EU	2011	0	0	summer 2011	loan	
17	MF	(Spain)	Hernández	35	EU	2011	0	0	summer 2011	loan	
9	MF	(Spain)	Zamora	36	EU	2011	0	0	summer 2011	loan	

- Last updated: 3 August 2011
- Ordered by starting 11, then appearances, then games started.

== Transfers ==
=== In ===
No.	Pos.	Nat.	Name	Age	EU	Moving from	Type	Transfer window	Ends	Transfer fee	Source
	DF	(Sweden)	Andersson	20	EU	Ängelholms FF	Loan return	Winter		Loan return	Halmstads BK
	MF	(Spain)	Diaz	32	EU	Leganés (Spain)	Transfer	Winter		unknown	Halmstads BK
	MF	(Spain)	Zamora	22	EU	Real Madrid Castilla (Spain)	Transfer	Winter		loan	Halmstads BK
	MF	(Spain)	Hernández	21	EU	Real Madrid Castilla (Spain)	Transfer	Winter		loan	Halmstads BK
	MF	(Spain)	Raúl	20	EU	Real Madrid Castilla (Spain)	Transfer	Winter		loan	Halmstads BK
	GK	(Spain)	Nauzet Perez	25	EU	Ceuta (Spain)	Transfer	Winter		Free	Halmstads BK
	GK	(Sweden)	Björn Åkesson	33	EU		Transfer	Summer		Free	Halmstads BK
	FW	(Sweden)	Joel Johansson	25	EU	IF Elfsborg	Transfer	Summer		loan	Halmstads BK

=== Out ===
No.	Pos.	Nat.	Name	Age	EU	Moving to	Type	Transfer window	Transfer fee	Source
	DF	(Sweden)	P. Johansson	32	EU		Contract ended	Winter	Free	Halmstads BK
	FW	(Sweden)	Kujović	22	EU	Kayserispor (Turkey)	Contract ended	Winter	Free	Hallandsposten
	MF	(Netherlands)	Prent	27	EU		Contract ended	Winter	Free	Hallandsposten
	DF	(Sweden)	Jönsson	34	EU		Retire	Winter	Retire	Hallandsposten
	FW	(Brazil)	Anselmo	30	Non-EU	Botafogo-SP (Brazil)	Transfer	Winter	Free	Hallandsposten
	GK	(Sweden)	Malmqvist	23	EU	Tromsø (Norway)	Loan	Winter	Loan	Halmstads BK
	FW	(Sweden)	Baqaj	20	EU	IF Limhamn Bunkeflo	Loan	Winter	Loan	LB07
	MF	(Spain)	Diaz	32	EU		Contract terminated	Summer	Free	Halmstads BK
	GK	(Spain)	Nauzet Perez	26	EU		Contract terminated	Summer	Free	Halmstads BK
	MF	(Spain)	Raúl	21	EU	Real Madrid Castilla (Spain)	Loan ended	Summer		Halmstads BK
	MF	(Spain)	Hernández	22	EU	Real Madrid Castilla (Spain)	Loan ended	Summer		Halmstads BK
	MF	(Spain)	Zamora	22	EU	Real Madrid Castilla (Spain)	Loan ended	Summer		Halmstads BK
	MF	(Sweden)	Salomonsson	22	EU	IFK Göteborg	Transfer	Summer	undisclosed	Halmstads BK
	FW	(Sweden)	Baqaj	20	EU	AlbinoLeffe (Italy)	Loan ended	Summer		Halmstads BK

Last updated: 28 September

== Appearances and goals ==
As of 29 May 2011

No.	Pos	Nat	Player	Total		Allsvenskan		Svenska Cupen	
No.	Pos	Nat	Player	Apps	Goals	Apps	Goals	Apps	Goals
1	GK	(Sweden) SWE	Karl-Johan Johnsson	23	0	21	0	2	0
2	DF	(Sweden) SWE	Viktor Ljung	9	0	9	0	0	0
3	DF	(Sweden) SWE	Johnny Lundberg	6	0	6	0	0	0
4	DF	(United States) USA	Ryan Miller	18	0	16	0	2	0
5	DF	(Sweden) SWE	Markus Gustafson	5	0	5	0	0	0
6	DF	(Sweden) SWE	Mikael Rosén	20	2	18	1	2	1
7	MF	(Germany) GER	Michael Görlitz	29	3	27	3	2	0
8	MF	(Iceland) ISL	Jonas Gudni Saevarsson	21	1	20	1	1	0
9	FW	(Sweden) SWE	Joel Johansson	9	3	9	3	0	0
10	MF	(Kosovo) KOS	Anel Raskaj	25	0	23	0	2	0
11	FW	(Sweden) SWE	Marcus Antonsson	4	0	4	0	0	0
12	DF	(Lithuania) LTU	Tomas Žvirgždauskas	17	0	16	0	1	0
13	MF	(Sweden) SWE	Kristoffer Thydell	6	0	6	0	0	0
15	FW	(Sweden) SWE	Joe Sise	20	5	19	5	1	0
16	DF	(Sweden) SWE	Christian Järdler	14	0	14	0	0	0
18	MF	(Sweden) SWE	Marcus Olsson	28	3	26	2	2	1
19	FW	(Sweden) SWE	Liridon Selmani	2	0	2	0	0	0
20	GK	(Sweden) SWE	Viktor Kristiansson	0	0	0	0	0	0
20	GK	(Sweden) SWE	Björn Åkesson	0	0	0	0	0	0
21	MF	(Kosovo) KOS	Kujtim Bala	21	1	19	1	2	0
22	MF	(Sweden) SWE	Niclas Johnsson	0	0	0	0	0	0
23	FW	(Sweden) SWE	Shkodran Maholli	2	0	2	0	0	0
24	MF	(Sweden) SWE	Ardian Rexhepi	6	0	4	0	2	0
25	DF	(Sweden) SWE	Richard Magyar	21	0	20	0	1	0
26	MF	(Sweden) SWE	Joakim Wrele	0	0	0	0	0	0
30	DF	(Sweden) SWE	Michael Svensson	7	0	7	0	0	0
Players who have departed the club after the start of the season:
9	MF	(Spain) ESP	José Zamora	11	1	9	0	2	1
11	MF	(Spain) ESP	Raúl Ruiz Matarín	16	1	14	1	2	0
14	MF	(Spain) ESP	Ivan Diaz	6	0	6	0	0	0
17	MF	(Spain) ESP	Javi Hernández	9	2	8	1	1	1
20	GK	(Spain) ESP	Nauzet Perez	7	0	7	0	0	0
19	MF	(Sweden) SWE	Emil Salomonsson	25	4	23	4	2	0

== Matches ==
=== Pre-season/friendlies ===
20 January 2011 Match 1	(Sweden) GAIS	1–0	Halmstads BK (Sweden)	Sørlandshallen, Kristiansand, Norway
20:30 CET	Abdulrahman 72'	(report) (in Swedish)	(yellow card) 48' Sævarsson	Attendance: N/A; Referee: N/A

21 January 2011 Match 2	(Norway) IK Start	2–0	Halmstads BK (Sweden)	Sørlandshallen, Kristiansand, Norway
21:00 CET	Hoff 33'; Werner 63'	(report) (in Swedish)	(yellow card) 38' Robson; (yellow card) 77' (yellow-red card) 79' Johnsson	Attendance: N/A; Referee: N/A

23 January 2011 Match 3	(Norway) Viking FK	2–1	Halmstads BK (Sweden)	Sørlandshallen, Kristiansand, Norway
13.00 CET	Andersson 80'; Ulland Andersen 88'	(report) (in Swedish)	(yellow card) 33' Raskaj; 44' Sise; (yellow card) 88' Žvirgždauskas	Attendance: N/A; Referee: N/A

5 February 2011 Match 4	(Sweden) Halmstads BK	0–1	Ängelholms FF (Sweden)	Sannarps IP, Halmstad
12:00 CET	Rosén (yellow card) 53'; Görlitz (yellow card) 86'	(report) (in Swedish)	58' Andersson	Attendance: 376; Referee: Kristoffer Karlsson

12 February 2011 Match 5	(Sweden) Jönköpings Södra IF	2–2	Halmstads BK (Sweden)	Elmiahallen, Jönköping
13:30 CET	Östlundh 54'; Bernholtz 81'	(report) (in Swedish)	16' Sise; 45' Raúl; (red card) 83' Olsson	Attendance: 402; Referee: N/A

19 February 2011 Match 6	(Sweden) Trelleborgs FF	3–0	Halmstads BK (Sweden)	, Trelleborg
13:00 CET	Koroma 7'; Pode 20'; Thiago 60'	(report) (in Swedish)

26 February 2011 Match 7	(Sweden) Halmstads BK	0–0	Helsingborgs IF (Sweden)	Sannarps IF, Halmstad
13:00 CET	Sise (yellow card); Raúl (yellow card) (yellow-red card); Hernandez (yellow card)	(report) (in Swedish)		Attendance: 497; Referee: Kristoffer Karlsson

5 March 2011 Match 8	(Sweden) Halmstads BK	2–0	Örgryte IS (Sweden)	Sannarps IF, Halmstad
13:00 CET	Görlitz 34'; Sise 36'	(report) (in Swedish)	Olsson (red card)	Attendance: 383; Referee: Adnan Jukic

24 March 2011 Match 9	(Sweden) Halmstads BK	1–2	IS Halmia (Sweden)	Alevallen, Halmstad
16:15 CET	Diaz 2'; Hernandez (yellow card)	(report) (in Swedish)	Sabo 36'; Maholli 72'	Attendance: N/A; Referee: Johan Nielsen

27 March 2011 Match 10	(Sweden) Kalmar FF	0–1	Halmstads BK (Sweden)	Loverslunds IP, Kalmar
12:00 CET	Sobralense (yellow card) 8'	(report) (in Swedish)	Saevarsson (yellow card); Hernandez (yellow card); Rexhepi 73'	Attendance: N/A; Referee: Magnus Ahlsén

=== Allsvenskan ===
2 April 2011 Match 1	Halmstads BK	0–0	Kalmar FF	Örjans Vall, Halmstad
16:00 CET	Sise (yellow card) 26'	(report) (in Swedish)	(yellow card) 80' Dauda	Attendance: 6 636; Referee: Daniel Stålhammar

11 April 2011 Match 2	Malmö FF	3–1	Halmstads BK	Swedbank Stadion, Malmö
19:00 CET	Mehmeti 59'; Aubynn 62'; Yago (yellow card) 74'; Mutavdžić 84'	(report) (in Swedish)	(yellow card) 3' Raúl; (yellow card) 27' (goal) 45' Sævarsson; (red card) 55' Zamora	Attendance: 18 843; Referee: Stefan Johannesson

16 April 2011 Match 3	Halmstads BK	0–2	GAIS	Örjans Vall, Halmstad
16:00 CET	Sise (red card) 12'; Žvirgždauskas (red card) 83'; Perez (yellow card) 87'	(report) (in Swedish)	(yellow card) 45' Ekunde; 78', 88'Wanderson; (yellow card) 87' Celik	Attendance: 4 259; Referee: Andreas Ekberg

20 April 2011 Match 4	IFK Norrköping	2–0	Halmstads BK	Nya Parken, Norrköping
19:00 CET	da Cruz 14'; Þorvaldsson 84'	(report) (in Swedish)		Attendance: 7 497; Referee: Martin Strömbergsson

24 April 2011 Match 5	Halmstads BK	1–1	Trelleborgs FF	Örjans Vall, Halmstad
16:30 CET	Salomonsson 74'	(report) (in Swedish)	49' (yellow card) 73' T. Persson	Attendance: 4 331; Referee: Daniel Stålhammar

2 May 2011 Match 6	Gefle IF	2–1	Halmstads BK	Strömvallen, Gävle
19:00 CET	Orlov 1', 73'; Lantto (yellow card) 90+1'	(report) (in Swedish)	63' Raúl; (yellow card) 77' Bala	Attendance: 2 593; Referee: Stefan Johannesson

7 May 2011 Match 7	Djurgårdens IF	2–0	Halmstads BK	Stockholm Stadium, Stockholm
16:00 CET	Igboananike 39' (pen.); Rajalakso 47'	(report) (in Swedish)	(yellow card) 8' Olsson; (red card) 36' Perez; (yellow card) 73' Žvirgždauskas	Attendance: 7 329; Referee: Jonas Eriksson

14 May 2011 Match 8	Halmstads BK	1–0	Mjällby AIF	Örjans Vall, Halmstad
14:00 CET	Rosengren 16' (o.g.); Sævarsson (yellow card) 57'	(report) (in Swedish)	(yellow card) 26' Grahn	Attendance: 3 663; Referee: Martin Hansson

23 May 2011 Match 9	IF Elfsborg	3–2	Halmstads BK	Borås Arena, Borås
19:00 CET	Ericsson 2'; Hult 9'; Karlsson (yellow card) 76'; Nilsson 88' (pen.); Elm (yellow card) 90+2'	(report) (in Swedish)	47' Olsson; 73' Hernández; (yellow card) 87' Magyar	Attendance: 8 209; Referee: Johan Hamlin

26 May 2011 Match 10	Halmstads BK	1–2	IFK Göteborg	Örjans Vall, Halmstad
19:00 CET	Hernández (yellow card) 41'; Görlitz 61'	(report) (in Swedish)	(yellow card) 6' Bjarnason; 8', 81' Hysen; (yellow card) 32' Svensson; (yellow card) 89' Lund	Attendance: 5 621; Referee: Markus Strömbergsson

11 June 2011 Match 11	Syrianska FC	0–0	Halmstads BK	Södertälje Fotbollsarena, Södertälje
18:00 CET	Ristic (yellow card) 80'; Barsom (yellow card) 93'	(report) (in Swedish)	(yellow card) 38' Raúl; (yellow card) 64' Rosén	Attendance: 1 928; Referee: Daniel Stålhammar

18 June 2011 Match 12	Halmstads BK	0–0	Örebro SK	Örjans Vall, Halmstad
16:00 CET	Raskaj (yellow card) 68'	(report) (in Swedish)	(yellow card) 37' Gerzić; (yellow card) 54' Wowoah	Attendance: 3 089; Referee: Michael Lerjéus

21 June 2011 Match 13	BK Häcken	3–1	Halmstads BK	Rambergsvallen, Gothenburg
19:00 CET	Elvby 37'; Anklev (yellow card) 70'; Williams 72'; Ranégie 74'	(report) (in Swedish)	34' Bala; (yellow card) 42' Rosén; (yellow card) 45' Järdler	Attendance: 2 575; Referee: Andreas Ekberg

27 June 2011 Match 14	Halmstads BK	1–2	Helsingborgs IF	Örjans Vall, Halmstad
19:00 CET	Salomonsson (yellow card) 28' (goal) 93'; Miller (yellow card) 31'; Järdler (yellow card) 54'; Žvirgždauskas (yellow card) 84'	(report) (in Swedish)	22', 67' Larsson; (yellow card) 32' Lindström; (yellow card) 35' Gerndt; (yellow card) 43' Nilsson	Attendance: 6 834; Referee: Stefan Johannesson

3 July 2011 Match 15	Halmstads BK	1–3	AIK	Örjans Vall, Halmstad
19:00 CET	Sise 17' (pen.)	(report) (in Swedish)	33' M. Bangura; 48', 86' T. Bangura	Attendance: 6 119; Referee: Jonas Eriksson

11 July 2011 Match 16	AIK	4–0	Halmstads BK	Råsunda Stadium, Solna, Stockholm
19:00 CET	T. Bangura 13', 15', 44', 57'	(report) (in Swedish)	(yellow card) 44' Žvirgždauskas; (yellow card) 82' Sævarsson	Attendance: 13 668; Referee: Martin Ingvarsson

17 July 2011 Match 17	Halmstads BK	1–2	IF Elfsborg	Örjans Vall, Halmstad
19:00 CET	Sise 17'; Olsson (yellow card) 39'	(report) (in Swedish)	(yellow card) 39' Christiansen; 47', 96' Elm; (yellow card) 50' Svensson; (yellow card) 70' Karlsson; (yellow card) 78' Andersson	Attendance: 5 865; Referee: Michael Lerjéus

25 July 2011 Match 18	IFK Göteborg	3–1	Halmstads BK	Gamla Ullevi, Gothenburg
19:00 CET	Svensson (yellow card) 1'; Hysén 16', 38', 56'; Eriksson (yellow card) 29'; Sana (yellow card) 49'; Johansson (yellow card) 63'; Bjarnason (yellow card) 68'	(report) (in Swedish)	(yellow card) 39' Johnsson; 61' Salomonsson; (yellow card) 88' Magyar; (yellow card) 90+4' Thydell	Attendance: 10 023; Referee: Tobias Mattsson

1 August 2011 Match 19	GAIS	2–1	Halmstads BK	Gamla Ullevi, Gothenburg
19:00 CET	Angus (yellow card) 8'; Celik 14', 83'; Lundgren (yellow card) 80'	(report) (in Swedish)	5' Görlitz; (yellow card) 15' Žvirgždauskas; (yellow card) 90+1' Järdler	Attendance: 4 430; Referee: Martin Strömbergsson

7 August 2011 Match 20	Halmstads BK	5–4	IFK Norrköping	Örjans Vall, Halmstad
16:30 CET	Salomonsson 8'; Sise 67' (pen.), 89'; Johansson 70'; Olsson 77'; Sævarsson (yellow card) 79'	(report) (in Swedish)	(yellow card) 10' (goal) 45' Hasani; 51' Þorvaldsson; 60' Telo; (yellow card) 67' Whass; 73' (yellow card) 88' Ajdarevic	Attendance: 3 784; Referee: Johan Hamlin

13 August 2011 Match 21	Halmstads BK	0–1	BK Häcken	Örjans Vall, Halmstad
16:00 CET	Žvirgždauskas (yellow card) 46'; Svensson (yellow card) 88'	(report) (in Swedish)	31' (yellow card) 56' Chibuike; (yellow card) 45+1' (yellow-red card) 84' Bjurström; (yellow card) 55' Forsell	Attendance: 4 058; Referee: Michael Lerjéus

21 August 2011 Match 22	Helsingborgs IF	2–1	Halmstads BK	Olympia, Helsingborg
16:30 CET	Gashi (yellow card) 55'; Holgersson 75'; C. Andersson 79'	(report) (in Swedish)	(yellow card) 55' Olsson; 90+1' Rosén	Attendance: 10 212; Referee: Daniel Stålhammar

27 August 2011 Match 23	Trelleborgs FF	0–1	Halmstads BK	Vångavallen, Trelleborg
14:00 CET	Jensen (yellow card) 16'; Turunen (yellow card) 90+1'; Andersson (yellow card) 90+2'	(report) (in Swedish)	(yellow card) 24' Svensson; 76' (yellow card) 86' Johansson	Attendance: 1 510; Referee: Andreas Ekberg

12 September 2011 Match 24	Halmstads BK	2–2	Gefle IF	Örjans Vall, Halmstad
19:00 CET	Raskaj (yellow card) 16'; Görlitz 34'; Sise (yellow card) 52' (goal) 72'; Rosén (yellow card) 71'; Johnsson (yellow card) 90+2'	(report) (in Swedish)	25' Orlov; 36' (yellow card) 90+2' Dahlberg; (yellow card) 53' Hansson; (yellow card) 63' Asp	Attendance: 2 305; Referee: Andreas Ekberg

17 September 2011 Match 25	Kalmar FF	1–0	Halmstads BK	Guldfågeln Arena, Kalmar
16:00 CET	Israelsson 22'; Arajuuri (yellow card) 52'	(report) (in Swedish)	(yellow card) 37' Johansson; (yellow card) 90' Svensson	Attendance: 5 237; Referee: Johan Hamlin

17 September 2011 Match 26	Halmstads BK	1–5	Malmö FF	Örjans Vall, Halmstad
19:00 CET	Žvirgždauskas (yellow card) 9'; Johansson 66'; Görlitz (yellow card) 87'	(report) (in Swedish)	(yellow card) 16' Pękalski; 29', 89' Ranégie; 40' Hamad; 53' (yellow card) 66' Durmaz; 81' Figueiredo	Attendance: 3 065; Referee: Martin Strömbergsson

24 September 2011 Match 27	Halmstads BK	0–1	Syrianska FC	Örjans Vall, Halmstad
16:00 CET		(report) (in Swedish)	41' Barsom; (yellow card) 90+1' Felic	Attendance: 2 092; Referee: Johan Hamlin

2 October 2011 Match 28	Örebro SK	1–0	Halmstads BK	Behrn Arena, Örebro
16:30 CET	18' Rama; (yellow card) 76' Kilberg	(report) (in Swedish)	(yellow card) 49' Thydell	Attendance: 4 321; Referee: Bojan Pandzic

17 October 2011 Match 29	Halmstads BK	1–3	Djurgårdens IF	Örjans Vall, Halmstad
19:00 CET	24' Görlitz; (yellow card) 65' Järdler	(report) (in Swedish)	26' Sjölund; 35' Toivio; (yellow card) 54' Igboananike; 85' Jonson	Attendance: 1 874; Referee: Michael Lerjéus

23 October 2011 Match 30	Mjällby AIF	2–0	Halmstads BK	Strandvallen, Hällevik
16:30 CET	(yellow card) 5' Grahn; 7' Ekenberg; 22' Löfquist	(report) (in Swedish)		Attendance: 3 010; Referee: Martin Ingvarsson

=== Svenska cupen ===
18 May 2011 Third round	Karlstad BK	1–4	Halmstads BK	Tingvalla IP, Karlstad
19:00 CET	Feltsten 11'; Sjöstedt (red card) 68'; Werner (yellow card) 65'	(report) (in Swedish)	56' Rosén; (yellow card) 59' Raúl; 66' Zamora; 80' (red card) 84' Hernández; 90' Olsson	Attendance: 1 192; Referee: Johan Hamlin

29 May 2011 Fourth round	Halmstads BK	0–3	Malmö FF	Örjans Vall, Halmstad
18:00 CET	Raúl (yellow card) 74'	(report) (in Swedish)	18' Larsson; 33' Andersson; (yellow card) 38' Aubynn; (yellow card) 38' Ricardinho; 66' Hamad; (yellow card) 75' Mutavdžić	Attendance: 1 386; Referee: Martin Hansson

== Competitions ==
=== Allsvenskan ===
==== Standings ====
Pos	Team	Pld	W	D	L	GF	GA	GD	Pts	Qualification or relegation
12	Örebro SK	30	11	3	16	36	45	−9	36	
13	IFK Norrköping	30	9	7	14	32	49	−17	34	
14	Syrianska FC (O)	30	8	4	18	27	44	−17	28	Qualification to Relegation play-offs
15	Trelleborgs FF (R)	30	7	4	19	39	64	−25	25	Relegation to Superettan
16	Halmstads BK (R)	30	3	5	22	24	58	−34	14	Relegation to Superettan

Source: svenskfotboll.se (in Swedish)
Rules for classification: 1) points; 2) goal difference; 3) number of goals scored.
(O) Play-off winners; (R) Relegated

==== Results summary ====
Overall								Home						Away					
Pld	W	D	L	GF	GA	GD	Pts	W	D	L	GF	GA	GD	W	D	L	GF	GA	GD
29	3	5	21	24	56	−32	14	2	4	9	15	28	−13	1	1	12	9	28	−19

Last updated: 18 October 2011.
Source: SvFF.se (in Swedish)

==== Results by round ====
Round	1	2	3	4	5	6	7	8	9	10	11	12	13	14	15	16	17	18	19	20	21	22	23	24	25	26	27	28	29	30
Ground	H	A	H	A	H	A	A	H	A	H	A	H	A	H	H	A	H	A	A	H	H	A	A	H	B	H	H	A	H	A
Result	D	L	L	L	D	L	L	W	L	L	D	D	L	L	L	L	L	L	L	W	L	L	W	D	L	L	L	L	L	L
Position	10	13	13	14	14	14	15	16	16	16	16	16	16	16	16	16	16	16	16	16	16	16	16	16	16	16	16	16	16	16

Updated to match(es) played on 10 October 2011. Source: SvFF.se (in Swedish)
A = Away; H = Home; W = Win; D = Draw; L = Loss

== Season statistics ==
=== Allsvenskan ===
Name	Matches	Goals
(Sweden) Joe Sise	19	5
(Sweden) Emil Salomonsson	23	4
(Germany) Michael Görlitz	27	4
(Sweden) Joel Johansson	9	3
(Sweden) Marcus Olsson	26	2
(Iceland) Jónas Sævarsson	20	1
(Spain) Raúl	14	1
(Spain) Javi	8	1
(Kosovo) Kujtim Bala	19	1
(Sweden) Mikael Rosén	18	1

Name	Yellow card	Yellow card Red card	Red card
(Lithuania) Tomas Žvirgždauskas	6	0	1
(Sweden) Joe Sise	2	0	1
(Spain) Nauzet Perez	1	0	1
(Spain) José Zamora	0	0	1
(Iceland) Jónas Sævarsson	4	0	0
(Sweden) Christian Järdler	4	0	0
(Sweden) Marcus Olsson	3	0	0
(Sweden) Michael Svensson	3	0	0
(Sweden) Mikael Rosén	3	0	0
(Spain) Raúl	2	0	0
(Sweden) Richard Magyar	2	0	0
(Sweden) Joel Johansson	2	0	0
(Kosovo) Anel Raskaj	2	0	0
(Sweden) Karl-Johan Johnsson	2	0	0
(Kosovo) Kujtim Bala	1	0	0
(Spain) Javi	1	0	0
(United States) Ryan Miller	1	0	0
(Sweden) Emil Salomonsson	1	0	0
(Sweden) Kristoffer Thydell	2	0	0
(Germany) Michael Görlitz	1	0	0

= Number of bookings
= Number of sending offs after a second yellow card
= Number of sending offs by a direct red card

=== Svenska cupen ===
Name	Matches	Goals
(Sweden) Mikael Rosén	1	1
(Spain) José Zamora	1	1
(Spain) Javi Hernández	1	1
(Sweden) Marcus Olsson	1	1

Name	Yellow card	Yellow card Red card	Red card
(Spain) Raúl	2	0	0
(Spain) Javi Hernández	1	1	0

= Number of bookings
= Number of sending offs after a second yellow card
= Number of sending offs by a direct red card

== International players ==
Does only contain players that represent the senior squad during the 2011 season.

=== Youth ===
Date	Typ of match	Nation	Player	Opponents	Mins.	Goals
31 May 2011	Exhibition	Sweden U-18	Shkodran Maholli	Poland U-18	63	0
2 June 2011	Exhibition	Sweden U-18	Shkodran Maholli	Poland U-18	1	0
2 June 2011	Exhibition	Sweden U-18	Kristoffer Thydell	Poland U-18	14	0
1 September 2011	Exhibition	Sweden U-18	Kristoffer Thydell	Denmark U-18	75	0
3 September 2011	Exhibition	Sweden U-18	Kristoffer Thydell	Greece U-18	90	0
8 October 2011	2012 Euro U-19 qualification	Sweden U-18	Kristoffer Thydell	Italy U-18	90	0
11 October 2011	2012 Euro U-19 qualification	Sweden U-18	Kristoffer Thydell	Romania U-18	90	0

=== U-21 ===
Date	Typ of match	Nation	Player	Opponents	Mins.	Goals
10 August 2011	Exhibition	Sweden U-21	Karl-Johan Johnsson	Netherlands U-21	45	0
1 September 2011	2013 Euro U-21 qualification	Sweden U-21	Karl-Johan Johnsson	Lithuania U-21	90	0
5 September 2011	2013 Euro U-21 qualification	Sweden U-21	Karl-Johan Johnsson	Lithuania U-21	90	0
6 October 2011	2013 Euro U-21 qualification	Sweden U-21	Karl-Johan Johnsson	Slovenia U-21	90	0
10 October 2011	2013 Euro U-21 qualification	Sweden U-21	Karl-Johan Johnsson	Finland U-21	90	0
15 November 2011	2013 Euro U-21 qualification	Sweden U-21	Karl-Johan Johnsson	Malta U-21	90	0

=== Senior ===
Date	Typ of match	Nation	Player	Opponents	Mins.	Goals
22 January 2011	Exhibition	Sweden	Emil Salomonsson	South Africa	90	0
22 January 2011	Exhibition	Lithuania	Tomas Žvirgždauskas	Poland	45	0

==== Called up - not participating ====
- Emil Salomonsson - Botswana vs Sweden, 1-2
- (United States) Ryan Miller - USA vs Chile, 1-1
- Tomas Žvirgždauskas - Lithuania vs Spain, 1-3
