= 2009 Halmstads BK season =

Halmstads BK
2009 season
- Chairman: Ingemar Broström
- Manager: Janne Andersson
- Allsvenskan: 13th
- Svenska Cupen: 4th round
- Top goalscorer: League: Emir Kujovic (8); All: Emir Kujovic (9)
- Highest home attendance: 9 247 vs IFK Göteborg (6 July)
- Lowest home attendance: 2 107 vs GAIS (1 November)

In 2009 Halmstads BK competed in Allsvenskan and Svenska Cupen, the club also had the possibility to play in the newly formed UEFA Europa League due to the team's 4th place in the Swedish fair-play table, Kalmar FF, Helsingborgs IF and IFK Göteborg where already qualified for European cups through the league and national cup, however Norway, Denmark and Scotland came ahead.

== Squad ==
=== First-team squad ===
Updated 29 July 2009. Note: Flags indicate national team as defined under FIFA eligibility rules; some limited exceptions apply. Players may hold more than one non-FIFA nationality.

No.	Pos.	Nation	Player
1	GK	SWE	Karl-Johan Johnsson
2	DF	SWE	Per Johansson
3	DF	SWE	Johnny Lundberg
4	DF	SWE	Tommy Jönsson (Captain)
5	DF	SWE	Markus Gustafson
6	DF	SWE	Mikael Rosén
7	MF	GER	Michael Görlitz
8	FW	SWE	Ajsel Kujovic
9	FW	SWE	Emir Kujovic
10	MF	SWE	Anel Raskaj
11	MF	NED	Alexander Prent
12	DF	LTU	Tomas Žvirgždauskas

No.	Pos.	Nation	Player
13	MF	CHA	Azrack Mahamat (On loan from RCD Espanyol B)
14	FW	BRA	Anselmo
15	MF	SWE	Joe Sise
16	MF	FIN	Tim Sparv
17	DF	SWE	Christian Järdler
18	MF	SWE	Marcus Olsson
19	MF	SWE	Emil Salomonsson
20	GK	FIN	Magnus Bahne
23	DF	SWE	Emil Jensen
24	MF	ISL	Jónas Sævarsson
25	MF	KOS	Kujtim Bala

=== Youth squad ===
Note: Flags indicate national team as defined under FIFA eligibility rules; some limited exceptions apply. Players may hold more than one non-FIFA nationality.

No.	Pos.	Nation	Player
—	GK	SWE	Viktor Kristiansson
—	GK	SWE	Stefan Markovic
—	DF	SWE	Per Gulda
—	DF	SWE	Niclas Johnsson ^{*}
—	DF	SWE	Emil Larsson
—	DF	SWE	Johnny Müller
—	DF	SWE	Johan Otterström
—	DF	SWE	Johan Palm ^{*}
—	DF	SWE	Sebastian Starkenberg
—	DF	SWE	Joacim Wallentin
—	MF	SWE	Thomas Allerbrand

No.	Pos.	Nation	Player
—	MF	SWE	Jonatan Alvérus
—	MF	SWE	Pehr Andersson ^{*}
—	MF	KOS	Kujtim Bala ^{*}
—	MF	SWE	Marcus Johansson
—	MF	SWE	Jonas Lindh
—	MF	SWE	Alexander Sakac
—	MF	SWE	Berat Sulejmani
—	FW	SWE	Eddie Andersson
—	FW	SWE	Nehat Bregaj
—	FW	SWE	Bujar Mazreku ^{*}
—	FW	SWE	Ronny Sabo

- ^{* = Can be called up to the First-team}

== Transfers ==
=== In ===
Note: Flags indicate national team as defined under FIFA eligibility rules; some limited exceptions apply. Players may hold more than one non-FIFA nationality.

No.	Pos.	Nation	Player
22	GK	SWE	Karl-Johan Johnsson (From Halmstads BK youth squad)
—	DF	SWE	Christian Järdler (From Malmö FF)
—	MF	ISL	Jónas Sævarsson (From KR Reykjavík)
—	MF	CHA	Azrack Mahamat (On loan from RCD Espanyol B)
—	DF	SWE	Johnny Lundberg (From FC Nordsjælland)

=== Out ===
Note: Flags indicate national team as defined under FIFA eligibility rules; some limited exceptions apply. Players may hold more than one non-FIFA nationality.

No.	Pos.	Nation	Player
—	GK	SWE	Marcus Sahlman (To Tromsø IL)
—	DF	SWE	Jesper Westerberg (Released as a free agent)
—	GK	SWE	Conny Johansson (Released as a free agent)
—	MF	SWE	Hjalmar Öhagen (To Gefle IF)
—	DF	SWE	Daniel Johansson (To Falkenbergs FF)
—	FW	SWE	Magnus Arvidsson (To Helsingborgs IF)
—	MF	SWE	Andreas Johansson (To VfL Bochum)

=== Out on loan ===
Note: Flags indicate national team as defined under FIFA eligibility rules; some limited exceptions apply. Players may hold more than one non-FIFA nationality.

No.	Pos.	Nation	Player
24	MF	SWE	Sebastian Johansson (On loan to Örgryte IS)

== Appearances and goals ==
Last updated on 1 November 2009.

No.	Pos	Nat	Player	Total		Allsvenskan		Svenska Cupen	
No.	Pos	Nat	Player	Apps	Goals	Apps	Goals	Apps	Goals
1	GK	(Sweden) SWE	Karl-Johan Johnsson	5	0	3	0	2	0
2	DF	(Sweden) SWE	Per Johansson	16	0	14	0	2	0
3	DF	(Sweden) SWE	Johnny Lundberg	13	1	13	1	0	0
4	DF	(Sweden) SWE	Tommy Jönsson	23	0	22	0	1	0
5	DF	(Sweden) SWE	Markus Gustafson	3	0	2	0	1	0
6	DF	(Sweden) SWE	Mikael Rosén	26	2	24	2	2	0
7	MF	(Germany) GER	Michael Görlitz	31	3	30	3	1	0
8	FW	(Sweden) SWE	Ajsel Kujovic	11	1	9	0	2	1
9	FW	(Sweden) SWE	Emir Kujovic	31	9	29	8	2	1
10	MF	(Kosovo) KOS	Anel Raskaj	32	1	30	1	2	0
11	MF	(Netherlands) NED	Alexander Prent	6	0	4	0	2	0
12	DF	(Lithuania) LTU	Tomas Zvirgzdauskas	30	0	29	0	1	0
13	MF	(Sweden) SWE	Andreas Johansson	13	3	12	3	1	0
13	MF	(Chad) CHA	Azrack Mahamat	8	1	8	1	0	0
14	FW	(Brazil) BRA	Anselmo	23	3	21	3	2	0
15	MF	(Sweden) SWE	Joe Sise	14	1	14	1	0	0
16	MF	(Finland) FIN	Tim Sparv	27	1	26	1	1	0
17	DF	(Sweden) SWE	Christian Järdler	21	0	21	0	0	0
18	MF	(Sweden) SWE	Marcus Olsson	22	4	20	4	2	0
19	MF	(Sweden) SWE	Emil Salomonsson	27	0	26	0	1	0
20	GK	(Finland) FIN	Magnus Bahne	27	0	27	0	0	0
23	DF	(Sweden) SWE	Emil Jensen	1	0	0	0	1	0
24	MF	(Sweden) SWE	Sebastian Johansson	10	0	8	0	2	0
24	MF	(Iceland) ISL	Jónas Sævarsson	14	0	14	0	0	0
25	MF	(Sweden) SWE	Kujtim Bala	1	0	1	0	0	0

== Friendly ==
31 January 2009 Match 1	(Sweden) Halmstads BK	4–0	Falkenbergs FF (Sweden)	Sannarps IP, Halmstad
	Anselmo 8'; Ajsel Kujovic 45'; Emir Kujovic 87' 89'	(Report) (in Swedish)		Attendance: 451; Referee: Martin Olsson

3 February 2009 Match 2	(Sweden) Halmstads BK	1–1	Ängelholms FF (Sweden)	Sannarps IP, Halmstad
	Emir Kujovic 17'	(Report) (in Swedish)	Mattias Adelstam 57'	Attendance: 211; Referee: Daniel Stålhammar

10 February 2009 Match 3	(Denmark) FC Nordsjælland	0–1	Halmstads BK (Sweden)	Værløse Stadion, Værløse
		(Report) (in Swedish)	Marcus Olsson 85'	Attendance: N/A; Referee: N/A

14 February 2009 Match 4	(Sweden) Halmstads BK	1–2	AB (Denmark)	Sannarps IP, Halmstad
	Anselmo 72'	(Report) (in Swedish)	Klas Lykke 15'; Poul Hübertz 55'	Attendance: 263; Referee: Daniel Stålhammar

24 February 2009 Match 5	(Spain) Espanyol B	2–1	Halmstads BK (Sweden)	Ciutat Esportiva de Sant Adrià, Barcelona
	Javi Márquez 48' (pen.); Raúl Guerrero 83'	(Report) (in Swedish)	Anselmo 33'	Attendance: N/A; Referee: N/A

6 March 2009 Match 6	(Sweden) Kalmar FF	1–0	Halmstads BK (Sweden)	Loverslund, Kalmar
	Emin Nouri 25'	(Report) (in Swedish)		Attendance: N/A; Referee: Daniel Stålhammar

11 March 2009 Match 7	(Italy) UC AlbinoLeffe	0–2	Halmstads BK (Sweden)
		(Report) (in Swedish)	Michael Görlitz 37'; Tomas Zvirgzdauskas 68'	Attendance: N/A; Referee: N/A

17 March 2009 Match 8	(Sweden) Halmstads BK	1–0	Qviding FIF (Sweden)	Alevallen, Halmstad
	Marcus Olsson 31'	(Report) (in Swedish)		Attendance: N/A; Referee: N/A

21 March 2009 Match 9	(Sweden) IF Elfsborg	4–0	Halmstads BK (Sweden)	Borås Arena, Borås
	Anders Svensson 4'; Daniel Mobaeck 48'; Stefan Ishizaki 76'; Denni Avdic 83'	(Report) (in Swedish)		Attendance: N/A; Referee: Martin Ingvarsson

24 March 2009 Match 10	(Sweden) Halmstads BK	2–2	GAIS (Sweden)	Alevallen, Halmstad
	Michael Görlitz 50'; Tommy Jönsson 55'	(Report) (in Swedish)	Pär Eriksson 66' 74'	Attendance: N/A; Referee: Martin Olsson

27 March 2009 Match 11	(Denmark) Brøndby IF	1–0	Halmstads BK (Sweden)	Brøndby Stadium, Copenhagen
	Mikkel Bischoff 63'	(Report) (in Swedish)

29 June 2009 Match 12	(Sweden) Trelleborgs FF	2–2	Halmstads BK (Sweden)	Smygehamns IP, Trelleborg
	Magnus Andersson 18'; Andreas Drugge 23'	(Report) (in Swedish)	Tommy Jönsson 38' (pen.); Anselmo 88'	Attendance: 350; Referee: Håkan Jonasson

15 July 2009 Match 13	(Sweden) Alets IK	0–7	Halmstads BK (Sweden)	Allevallen, Halmstad
		(Report) (in Swedish)	Michael Görlitz 13', 22', 58'; Joe Sise 40'; Emir Kujovic 58', 60'; Alexander Prent 87'	Attendance: 328; Referee: Jonas Carlsson

8 September 2009 Match 14	(Denmark) FC Nordsjælland	2–0	Halmstads BK (Sweden)	Farum Park, Farum
	Emil Jensen 7' (o.g.); Nicki Bille 71'	(Report) (in Swedish)		Attendance: 75

== Allsvenskan ==
Pos	Team	Pld	W	D	L	GF	GA	GD	Pts	Qualification or relegation
11	GAIS	30	8	11	11	41	38	+3	35	
12	IF Brommapojkarna	30	9	7	14	32	46	−14	34	
13	Halmstads BK	30	8	8	14	29	43	−14	32	
14	Djurgårdens IF (O)	30	8	5	17	24	49	−25	29	Qualification to Relegation play-offs
15	Örgryte IS (R)	30	6	7	17	27	49	−22	25	Relegation to Superettan

Source: svenskfotboll.se (in Swedish)
Rules for classification: 1) points; 2) goal difference; 3) number of goals scored.
(O) Play-off winners; (R) Relegated

=== Top scorers Allsvenskan ===
Name	Matches	Goals
(Sweden) Emir Kujovic	29	8
(Sweden) Marcus Olsson	20	4
(Sweden) Andreas Johansson	12	3
(Germany) Michael Görlitz	30	3
(Brazil) Anselmo	21	3
(Sweden) Mikael Rosén	24	2
(Sweden) Anel Raskaj	30	1
(Sweden) Joe Sise	14	1
(Chad) Azrack Mahamat	8	1
(Finland) Tim Sparv	26	1
(Iceland) Jónas Sævarsson	14	1
(Sweden) Johnny Lundberg	13	1

=== Matches ===
5 April 2009 Match 1	AIK	1–0	Halmstads BK	Råsunda, Stockholm
15:00 CET	Gabriel Özkan 55'	(report) (in Swedish)		Attendance: 21 867; Referee: Martin Hansson

10 April 2009 Match 2	Halmstads BK	1–1	Trelleborgs FF	Örjans Vall, Halmstad
15:00 CET	Emir Kujovic 73'	(report) (in Swedish)	Markus Pode 43'	Attendance: 6178; Referee: Stefan Johannesson

15 April 2009 Match 3	Halmstads BK	0–1	Brommapojkarna	Örjans Vall, Halmstad
19:00 CET		(report) (in Swedish)	Joakmin Runnemo 65'	Attendance: 4354; Referee: Daniel Stålhammar

19 April 2009 Match 4	Kalmar FF	0–1	Halmstads BK	Fredriksskans, Kalmar
15:00 CET		(report) (in Swedish)	Anel Raskaj 7'	Attendance: 4 434; Referee: Markus Strömbergsson

23 April 2009 Match 5	Helsingborgs IF	1–3	Halmstads BK	Olympia, Helsingborg
19:00 CET	Emil Salomonsson 28' o.g.	(report) (in Swedish)	Anselmo 69'; Joe Sise 80'; Mikael Rosén 90'	Attendance: 8 818; Referee: Stefan Johannesson

29 April 2009 Match 6	Halmstads BK	3–0	Djurgårdens IF	Örjans Vall, Halmstad
19:00 CET	Andreas Johansson 69'; Emir Kujovic 82' 88'	(report) (in Swedish)		Attendance: 5 478; Referee: Jonas Eriksson

5 May 2009 Match 7	BK Häcken	2–2	Halmstads BK	Rambergsvallen, Gothenburg
19:00 CET	Jonas Henriksson 3'; Mathias Ranégie 90'	(report) (in Swedish)	Andreas Johansson 29'; Anselmo 69'	Attendance: 1 970; Referee: Markus Strömbergsson

10 May 2009 Match 8	Halmstads BK	2–1	Örgryte IS	Örjans Vall, Halmstad
17:00 CET	Michael Görlitz 54'; Andreas Johansson 66'	(report) (in Swedish)	David Leinar 28'	Attendance: 4889; Referee: Sven-Martin Åkesson

16 May 2009 Match 9	IF Elfsborg	4–0	Halmstads BK	Borås Arena, Borås
16:00 CET	Daniel Nordmark 11'; James Keene 20' 44'; Denni Avdic 45'	(report) (in Swedish)		Attendance: 8 163; Referee: Michael Lerjéus

20 May 2009 Match 10	Halmstads BK	0–2	Gefle IF	Örjans Vall, Halmstad
19:00 CET		(report) (in Swedish)	Yussif Chibsah 38' (pen.) 61'	Attendance: 3 504; Referee: Håkan Jonasson

23 May 2009 Match 11	Hammarby IF	0–0	Halmstads BK	Söderstadion, Stockholm
16:00 CET		(report) (in Swedish)		Attendance: 8 110; Referee: Martin Ingvarsson

31 May 2009 Match 12	Halmstads BK	1–1	Örebro SK	Örjans Vall, Halmstad
17:00 CET	Michael Görlitz 70'	(report) (in Swedish)	Tommy Wirtanen 40'	Attendance: 3 852; Referee: Åke Andreasson

6 July 2009 Match 13	Halmstads BK	0–0	IFK Göteborg	Örjans Vall, Halmstad
20:00 CET		(report) (in Swedish)		Attendance: 9 247; Referee: Martin Ingvarsson

12 July 2009 Match 14	GAIS	1–1	Halmstads BK	Gamla Ullevi, Gothenburg
18:00 CET	Calum Angus 94'	(report) (in Swedish)	Emir Kujovic 36'	Attendance: 4 064; Referee: Åke Andreasson

20 July 2009 Match 15	Malmö FF	0–0	Halmstads BK	Swedbank Stadion, Malmö
19:00 CET		(report) (in Swedish)		Attendance: 13 012; Referee: Stefan Johannesson

27 July 2009 Match 16	Halmstads BK	0–3	Malmö FF	Örjans Vall, Halmstad
19:00 CET		(report) (in Swedish)	Jiloan Hamad 67'; Agon Mehmeti 87', 90'	Attendance: 8 106; Referee: Martin Hansson

2 August 2009 Match 17	IF Brommapojkarna	2–1	Halmstads BK	Grimsta IP, Bromma
18:00 CET	Philip Haglund 5'; Dalil Benyahia 29'	(report) (in Swedish)	Emir Kujovic 75'	Attendance: 1 708; Referee: Martin Strömbergsson

9 August 2009 Match 18	Halmstads BK	2–0	Kalmar FF	Örjans Vall, Halmstad
18:00 CET	Emir Kujovic 26'; Marcus Olsson 91'	(report) (in Swedish)		Attendance: 5 128; Referee: Markus Strömbergsson

17 August 2009 Match 19	Halmstads BK	1–2	AIK	Örjans Vall, Halmstad
19:00 CET	Mikael Rosén 10'	(report) (in Swedish)	Ivan Obolo 12'; Kenny Pavey 36'	Attendance: 5 425; Referee: Michael Lerjéus

24 August 2009 Match 20	Trelleborgs FF	4–0	Halmstads BK	Vångavallen, Trelleborg
19:00 CET	Fredrik Jensen 1', 28'; Andreas Drugge 23'; Andreas Wihlborg 65'	(report) (in Swedish)		Attendance: 2680; Referee: Magnus Ahlsén

30 August 2009 Match 21	Halmstads BK	0–4	BK Häcken	Örjans Vall, Halmstad
17:00 CET		(report) (in Swedish)	Paulinho 22'; Jonas Henriksson 30', 54'; Erik Friberg 39'	Attendance: 3 726; Referee: Martin Hansson

15 September 2009 Match 22	Örgryte IS	2–1	Halmstads BK	Gamla Ullevi, Gothenburg
19:00 CET	Alvaro Santos 54'; Alexander Mellqvist 90'	(report) (in Swedish)	Marcus Olsson 41'	Attendance: 4 430; Referee: Markus Strömbergsson

19 September 2009 Match 23	Halmstads BK	2–1	Helsingborgs IF	Örjans Vall, Halmstad
16:00 CET	Michael Görlitz 29'; Anselmo 49'	(report) (in Swedish)	Marcus Lantz 64'	Attendance: 4467; Referee: Daniel Stålhammar

24 September 2009 Match 24	Djurgårdens IF	0–2	Halmstads BK	Stockholms Stadion, Stockholm
16:00 CET		(report) (in Swedish)	Marcus Olsson 57', 60'	Attendance: 6422; Referee: Jonas Eriksson

27 September 2009 Match 25	Halmstads BK	1–2	IF Elfsborg	Örjans Vall, Halmstad
16:00 CET	Azrack Mahamat 44'	(report) (in Swedish)	Martin Ericsson 27'; Denni Avdić 88'	Attendance: 4389; Referee: Markus Strömbergsson

4 October 2009 Match 26	Gefle IF	1–0	Halmstads BK	Strömvallen, Gävle
16:00 CET	Daniel Westin 2'	(report) (in Swedish)		Attendance: 2 338; Referee: Åke Andreasson

4 October 2009 Match 27	Halmstads BK	1–0	Hammarby IF	Örjans Vall, Halmstad
16:00 CET	Tim Sparv 78'	(report) (in Swedish)		Attendance: 4 324; Referee: Martin Ingvarsson

23 October 2009 Match 28	Örebro SK	2–1	Halmstads BK	Behrn Arena, Örebro
18:00 CET	Roni Porokara 32', 68'	(report) (in Swedish)	Emir Kujovic 29' (pen.)	Attendance: 4 223; Referee: Sven-Martin Åkesson

27 October 2009 Match 29	IFK Göteborg	2–2	Halmstads BK	Gamla Ullevi, Gothenburg
19:00 CET	Tobias Hysen 52', 76'	(report) (in Swedish)	Emir Kujovic 29'; Jónas Sævarsson 43'	Attendance: 16 687; Referee: Martin Ingvarsson

1 November 2009 Match 30	Halmstads BK	1–3	GAIS	Örjans Vall, Halmstad
15:00 CET	Johnny Lundberg 39'	(report) (in Swedish)	Calum Angus 18'; Wanderson do Carmo 74'; Hallgrímur Jónasson 84'	Attendance: 2 107; Referee: Daniel Stålhammar

== Svenska Cupen ==
=== Third round ===
26 April 2009 Third round	Skövde AIK	0–2	Halmstads BK	Södermalms IP, Skövde
17:00 CET		(report) (in Swedish)	Emir Kujovic 26'; Ajsel Kujovic 32'	Attendance: 955; Referee: Patrik Berglund

13 May 2009 Fourth round	Örebro SK	3–0	Halmstads BK	Behrn Arena, Örebro
19:00 CET	Alejandro Bedoya 76'; Emra Tahirović 86' 93'	(report) (in Swedish)		Attendance: 1 667; Referee: Magnus Ahlsén
