= Björn Westerblad =

Swedish footballer

Personal information
- Date of birth: 7 January 1985 (age 41)
- Place of birth: Sweden
- Height: 1.86 m (6 ft 1 in)
- Position: Midfielder

Youth career
- Ödåkra IF

Senior career*
Years	Team	Apps	(Gls)
2005	Helsingborgs IF	2	(0)
2006–2007	Trelleborgs FF	45	(8)
2008–2015	Ängelholms FF	185	(14)
2016–2017	Åtvidabergs FF	57	(2)
2018–2020	Ängelholms FF	50	(7)
- * Club domestic league appearances and goals

Björn Westerblad (born 7 January 1985) is a Swedish retired footballer who played as a midfielder.

In May 2020, 35-year old Westerblad announced his retirement from football.
