= José Zamora (footballer, born 1988) =

Spanish footballer

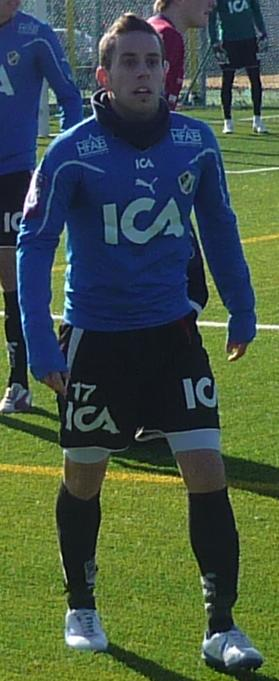
- Zamora training with Halmstad

Personal information
- Full name: José Zamora Girona
- Date of birth: 20 August 1988 (age 38)
- Place of birth: Barcelona, Spain
- Height: 1.69 m (5 ft 6 1/2 in)
- Position: Winger

Youth career
- 1993–1995: Júpiter
- 1995–2000: Gramenet
- 2000–2006: Espanyol

Senior career*
| Years | Team | Apps | (Gls) |
| 2006–2008 | Espanyol B | 50 | (7) |
| 2008 | → Eibar (loan) | 6 | (0) |
| 2008–2012 | Real Madrid B | 29 | (2) |
| 2009–2010 | → Ponferradina (loan) | 18 | (3) |
| 2011 | → Halmstad (loan) | 9 | (0) |
| Total | | 112 | (12) |

International career
| 2007 | Spain U19 | 6 | (0) |
- * Club domestic league appearances and goals

José Zamora Girona (born 20 August 1988) is a Spanish former professional footballer who played as a winger.

== Club career ==
Zamora was born in Barcelona, Catalonia. After playing for two clubs as a youth, he finished his development with another local side, RCD Espanyol, joining at the age of 12. He made his senior debut with their reserves, spending one and a half seasons in the Segunda División B.

Having been loaned to SD Eibar in February 2008, Zamora contributed one start to help the Basque team to retain their Segunda División status. In the summer, he signed with Real Madrid Castilla of the third division.

Zamora was loaned to SD Ponferradina for the 2009–10 campaign, being relatively used as they returned to the second tier after a three-year absence. On 1 February 2011, he was loaned to Swedish Allsvenskan club Halmstads BK alongside Castilla teammates Javi Hernández and Raúl Ruiz.

Aged only 23, Zamora retired due to injuries shortly after Castilla won promotion to the second division as champions.

== International career ==
Zamora was part of the Spanish squad that won the 2007 UEFA European Under-19 Championship in Austria. He played 26 minutes of the 1–0 win against Greece in the final, coming on as a substitute for Carles Coto.

== Honours ==
Real Madrid Castilla

- Segunda División B: 2011–12

Spain U19

- UEFA European Under-19 Championship: 2007
