= Johan Svensson (footballer) =

Swedish footballer

Personal information
- Date of birth: 22 January 1981 (age 45)
- Place of birth: Sweden
- Height: 1.74 m (5 ft 8 1/2 in)
- Position: Midfielder

Youth career
- Mjällby AIF

Senior career*
Years	Team	Apps	(Gls)
1999–2002	Mjällby AIF	115	(12)
2003–2004	Östers IF	56	(7)
2005–2012	Mjällby AIF	165	(10)
2012	→ Kristianstads FF (loan)	12	(0)
2013–2014	Sölvesborgs GoIF	36	(1)
- * Club domestic league appearances and goals

Johan Svensson (born 22 January 1981) is a Swedish footballer who played as a midfielder and spent most of his career in Mjällby AIF.
