= Anel Rashkaj =

Kosovan footballer

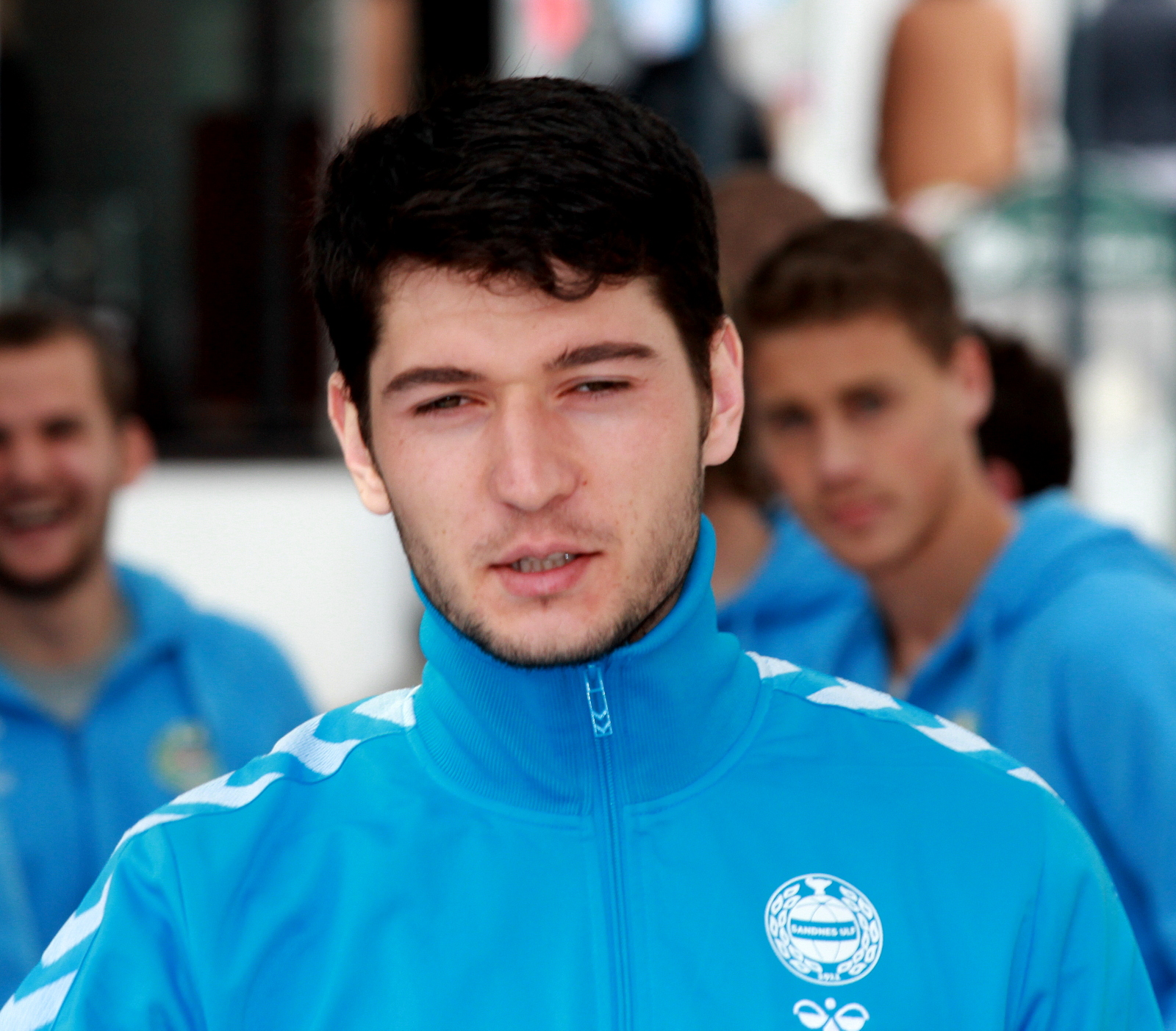
- Rashkaj with Sandnes Ulf in March 2014

Personal information
- Full name: Anel Rashkaj
- Date of birth: 19 August 1989 (age 37)
- Place of birth: Prizren, SAP Kosovo, SFR Yugoslavia
- Height: 1.80 m (5 ft 11 in)
- Position: Midfielder

Team information
- Current team: Kosovo U19 (assistant)

Youth career
- –2003: Liria
- 2003: IF Leikin
- 2003–2006: Halmstads BK

Senior career*
Years	Team	Apps	(Gls)
2007–2011	Halmstads BK	112	(2)
2012–2016	Sandnes Ulf	131	(5)
2017	AFC Eskilstuna	13	(0)
2017	Prishtina	3	(0)
2018–2019	AFC Eskilstuna	27	(2)
2020	SJK	13	(0)
2021–2022	Örgryte	40	(2)
Total		339	(11)

International career
2014–2020	Kosovo	14	(0)

Managerial career
- 2025–: Kosovo U19 (assistant)
- * Club domestic league appearances and goals

Anel Rashkaj (born 19 August 1989) is a Kosovan professional football coach and former player who is the assistant manager of Kosovo national under-19 team.

== Club career ==
=== Halmstads BK ===
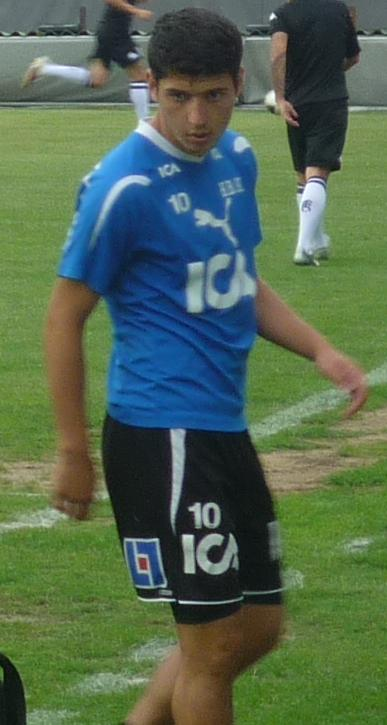
Rashkaj with Halmstads BK in 2010

Rashkaj started to play football for KF Liria, in Prizren, SFR Yugoslavia. At the age of 14 he moved with his family to Halmstad in Sweden, where he continued his football career in IF Leikin, however only for a few months before leaving for local rivals Halmstads BK. Although he had not been selected as a trainee, a youth team player training with the senior squad, in 2007 he was put on the bench home against IFK Göteborg in Allsvenskan and in the following away game against Kalmar FF he made his debut, replacing Martin Fribrock, just days following his 18th birthday.

Prior to the 2008 season. He was raised from the youth team to become a full member of the senior squad, mainly being used as left winger. In 2009 Rashkaj and Michael Görlitz were the only players to have played in all league games of the season, 30 matches in total, he also represented the club in all the other 17 games of the year, two cup and 15 friendly matches, thus being the only player that had played in all the club's matches in that year. Anel Rashkaj scored his first league goal in 2009 against Kalmar FF.

The 2010 season saw Janne Andersson leave as Halmstads BK manager and being replaced by Lars Jacobsson, the former assistant manager. Lars continued with Janne's 4-5-1 system, Rashkaj played most of his matches on the right side of the midfield, few times being used as left winger, scoring his second goal early in the season in Halmstad's 4–0 win over Åtvidabergs FF. The 2011 season started as the one before, Lars Jacobsson left the club and be replaced by Spanish Josep Clotet Ruiz, along with the new manager came a number of Spanish midfielders, which saw Anel moved from the starting lineup to the bench in the beginning of the league season, against many people's expectations. In the mid of the 2011 season the Spanish players left as their loan ended with the club and Clotet Ruiz was sacked following a long serie of poor results, under new manager Jens Gustafsson Rashkaj returned to the starting lineup, he was however unable to help Halmstad from being relegated by the end of the season.

Following the end of the 2011 season, several Halmstad players decided to leave the club, Anel Rashkaj among them, as his contract with the club ended. Rumors placed him in both Örebro SK and Kalmar FF.

=== Sandnes Ulf ===
On 30 January 2012, newly promoted Norwegian club Sandnes Ulf, confirmed that they had signed Rashkaj on a one-year contract.

=== AFC Eskilstuna ===
On 27 December 2016, Rashkaj signed with the newly promoted team of Allsvenskan side AFC Eskilstuna. On 2 April 2017, he made his debut in a 3–1 away defeat against GIF Sundsvall after being named in the starting line-up.

=== Prishtina ===
On 11 August 2017, Rashkaj signed to Football Superleague of Kosovo side Prishtina, on a two-year contract. On 20 August 2017, he made his debut in a 0–1 home defeat against Drita after being named in the starting line-up. On 29 September 2017, Rashkaj disconnected the contract with Prishtina due to not adapting.

=== Return to AFC Eskilstuna ===
On 18 December 2017, Rashkaj returned to Superettan side AFC Eskilstuna. On 31 March 2018, he made his debut in a 0–0 home draw against IK Brage after being named in the starting line-up. On 21 November 2019, Rashkaj disconnected the contract with AFC Eskilstuna.

=== SJK ===
On 8 February 2020, Rashkaj joined Veikkausliiga side SJK. Six days later, he made his debut with SJK in the 2020 Finnish Cup group stage against KuPS after being named in the starting line-up. On 13 November, Rashkaj left the club.

=== Örgryte ===
On 21 January 2021, Rashkaj signed a two-year contract with Superettan club Örgryte.

== International career ==
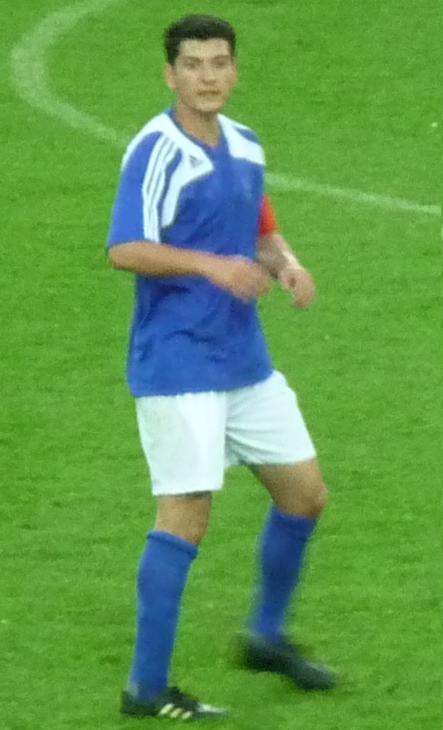
Rashkaj as team captain for Kosovo in 2010

=== Early career ===
On 27 March 2009, In an interview with the local newspaper Hallandsposten, Rashkaj stated that he had been in contact with Swedish U21 co-manager Jörgen Lennartsson, who had told him that he just had missed out on the 2009 UEFA European Under-21 Football Championship as he had not yet gained Swedish citizenship. He also stated in the interview that he would choose Sweden ahead of Kosovo, if he was considered good enough to get a position on the Swedish team. In another interview with Fotbolldirekt.se, he stated that Albania had already approached him and he had however turned them down.

=== Kosovo ===
In 2009. Rashkaj was called up to the unofficial Kosovo national team, playing under the name Team Kosovo, to play in two matches against Swedish opposition, first against 2008 Swedish champions Kalmar FF. Rashkaj did not take part in the second match against Malmö FF.

On 17 February 2010, Rashkaj was again called up from Kosovo for a friendly match against Albania.

On 10 June 2010, Rashkaj participated as team captain when Kosovo played a friendly against his club Halmstads BK on Örjans Vall in Halmstad, the match ended 4–4 with another Halmstads BK and Kosovo national player Kujtim Bala, scoring a goal.

On 28 July 2010, Rashkaj announced that he had chosen to represent the Kosovo, stating that he wished to play national team football and that he believed he would have more chance of doing so with Kosovo rather than Sweden. He also stated that he had not yet fully closed the door regarding Sweden as U21 coach Jörgen Lennartsson had stated he wished to see Rashkaj in the U21 team and the 2011 U21 European Championship in Denmark. However, he has yet to obtain Swedish citizenship and Kosovo has yet to be approved by FIFA.

He announced his retirement from the Kosovo national team on 4 June 2021, having won 14 caps for the nation between 2014 and 2020.

== Career statistics ==
As of 5 November 2016

=== Club ===
Club performance			League		Cup		Continental		Total	
Club	Season	Division	Apps	Goals	Apps	Goals	Apps	Goals	Apps	Goals
Sweden			League		Svenska Cupen		Europe		Total	
Halmstad	2007	Allsvenskan	3	0	–				3	0
Halmstad	2008	Allsvenskan	27	0	3	–	–		30	0
Halmstad	2009	Allsvenskan	30	1	2	–	–		32	1
Halmstad	2010	Allsvenskan	26	1	1	–	–		27	1
Halmstad	2011	Allsvenskan	26	0	2	–	–		28	0
Norway			League		Norwegian Cup		Europe		Total	
Sandnes	2012	Tippeligaen	21	3	1	0	–		22	3
Sandnes	2013	Tippeligaen	30	0	2	0	–		32	0
Sandnes	2014	Tippeligaen	26	0	1	0	–		27	0
Sandnes	2015	OBOS-ligaen	29	2	2	0	–		31	2
Sandnes	2016	OBOS-ligaen	25	0	3	0	–		28	0
Sweden			112	2	8	–	–		120	2
Norway			131	5	9	–	–		140	5
Career total			243	7	17	–	–		260	7

=== International ===
Appearances and goals by national team and year
National team	Year	Apps	Goals
Kosovo	2014	3	0
Kosovo	2015	0	0
Kosovo	2016	0	0
Kosovo	2017	0	0
Kosovo	2018	0	0
Kosovo	2019	6	0
Kosovo	2020	5	0
Total		14	0
