= Thommie Persson =

Swedish footballer

Personal information
- Date of birth: 4 August 1984 (age 42)
- Height: 1.84 m (6 ft 0 in)
- Position: Defender

Youth career
- Bara GIF

Senior career*
Years	Team	Apps	(Gls)
2003–2004	Malmö FF	1	(0)
2005–2011	Trelleborgs FF	157	(3)
2012–2016	Varbergs BoIS	84	(4)
- * Club domestic league appearances and goals

Thommie Persson (born 4 August 1984) is a Swedish footballer who played for Malmö FF, Trelleborgs FF and Varbergs BoIS as a defender. He played over 100 games in the Allsvenskan.
