= Marcus Olsson =

Swedish footballer

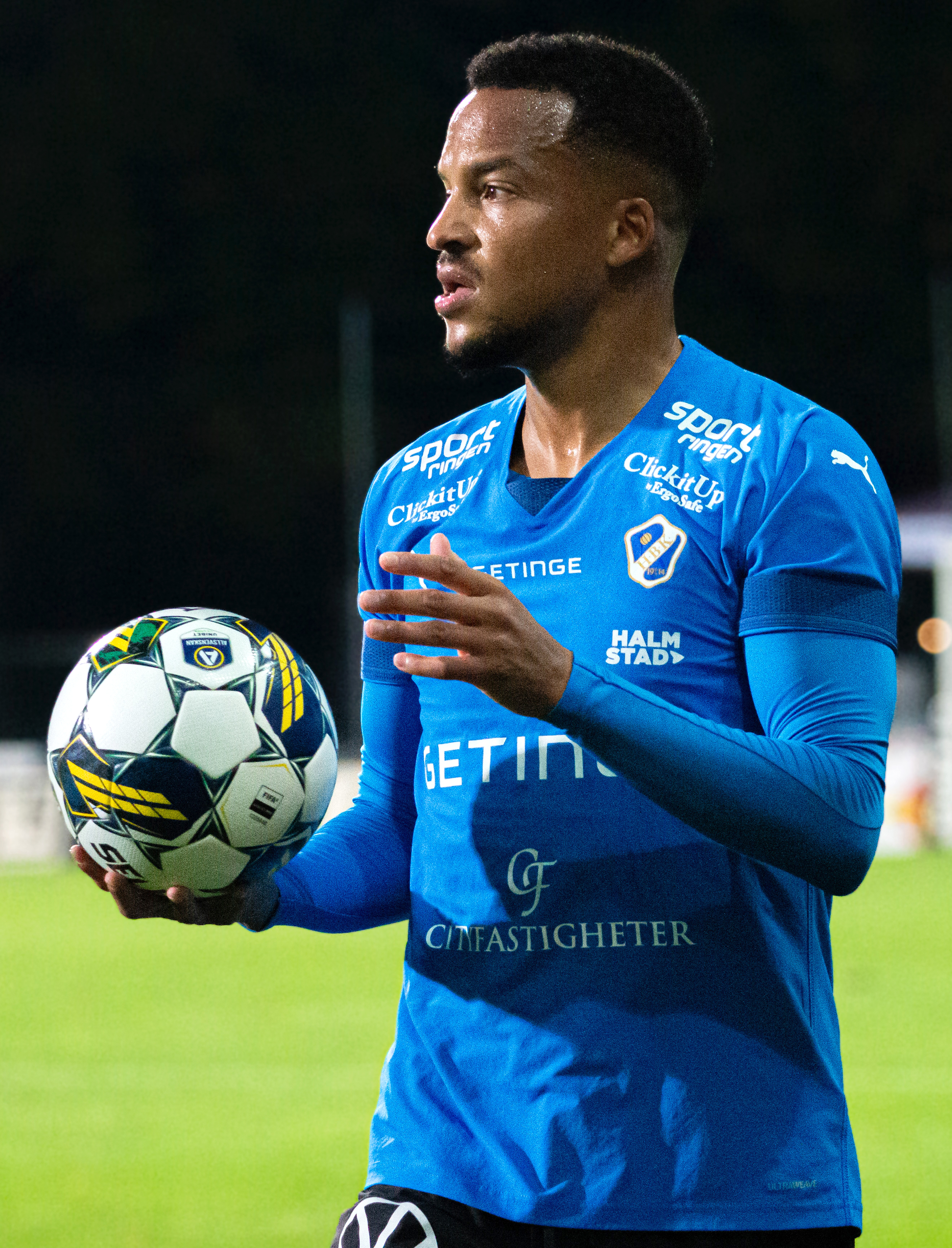
- Olsson in the colours of Halmstads BK in 2023

Personal information
- Full name: Marcus Jonas Munuhe Olsson
- Date of birth: 17 May 1988 (age 38)
- Place of birth: Gävle, Sweden
- Height: 1.80 m (5 ft 11 in)
- Position: Left-back

Team information
- Current team: Halmstad
- Number: 21

Youth career
- –2006: Högaborgs BK

Senior career*
Years	Team	Apps	(Gls)
2006–2007	Högaborgs BK	1	(1)
2008–2011	Halmstad	100	(12)
2012–2016	Blackburn Rovers	104	(1)
2016–2019	Derby County	61	(1)
2020	Helsingborg	2	(0)
2022–	Halmstad	73	(1)

International career
2009	Sweden U21	1	(0)
2012	Sweden	2	(0)
- * Club domestic league appearances and goals as of 12 November 2025

Marcus Jonas Munuhe Olsson (born 17 May 1988) is a Swedish professional footballer who plays as a midfielder and a left-back for Halmstad.

== Club career ==
=== Halmstads BK ===
Born in Gävle, Sweden, Olsson started his career at Högaborgs BK. In 2008, he signed a contract with Halmstad, replacing Martin Fribrock as left winger as Fribrock departed for Esbjerg fB in the summer of 2008. Mainly featured as left winger, he also used as a forward in several games, during Josep Clotet Ruiz time at Halmstad and the lack of a natural left side defender, Olsson and Kujtim Bala took turns on playing on the position. As Halmstads BK was relegated from Allsvenskan in 2011, Marcus announced that he would not sign a new contract with the club and that he would start searching for a new club to play for.

=== Blackburn Rovers ===
After rejecting a contract from Djurgårdens IF, and being linked to Standard Liège and Viking FK, Blackburn Rovers confirmed on 31 January that Olsson had signed a two-and-a-half-year contract with the club, joining his twin brother there.

Marcus Olsson made his debut for Blackburn Rovers in the 3–0 away defeat to Manchester City in the Premier League on 25 February 2012, playing on the left wing, in front of his twin Martin who played at left back, with both completing a full 90 minutes. He scored his first goal for Blackburn in a 3–3 draw with Leeds United on 1 September 2012.

Olsson was released by Rovers following the conclusion of his contract with the club on 1 July 2014, but after lengthy negotiations signed a new contract for the club on 11 July.

He was voted Blackburn Rovers player of the season for the 2014–15 season.

=== Derby County ===
On 26 January 2016, Olsson was transferred from Blackburn to Derby County for an undisclosed fee, signing a three-and-a-half-year contract.

Olsson played his full debut on 6 February 2016 against Fulham, scoring an own goal after 17 minutes. He scored his first goal for the club in a 1–0 win over Nottingham Forest on 19 March 2016.

He was released by Derby County at the end of the 2018–19 season.

=== Return to Halmstads BK ===
Olsson missed most of the 2020 season and all of 2021 season due to cruciate ligament injury. Upon recovering, on 28 January 2022 he returned to Halmstad.

== International career ==
Marcus Olsson was called up to the annual January tour of the Sweden national team in 2012, facing Bahrain and Qatar U23. He made his national team debut against Bahrain when he came on as a substitute for Tobias Hysén at half-time, he made his second appearance against Qatar in the following match, again coming on as a substitute at half-time, this time replacing Jiloan Hamad.

== Personal life ==
His twin brother Martin Olsson is also a professional footballer and plays for Malmö FF. Their brother-in-law is former Dallas Mavericks basketball player Dirk Nowitzki, who married their older sister Jessica.

== Career statistics ==
=== Club ===
As of match played 19 September 2023

Appearances and goals by club, season and competition
Club	Season	League			National Cup		League Cup		Other		Total	
Club	Season	Division	Apps	Goals	Apps	Goals	Apps	Goals	Apps	Goals	Apps	Goals
Halmstad	2008	Allsvenskan	21	1	0	0	—		—		21	1
Halmstad	2009	Allsvenskan	20	4	2	0	—		—		22	4
Halmstad	2010	Allsvenskan	30	4	1	0	—		—		31	4
Halmstad	2011	Allsvenskan	29	2	2	1	—		—		31	3
Halmstad	Total		100	11	5	1	—		—		105	12
Blackburn Rovers	2011–12	Premier League	12	0	0	0	0	0	—		12	0
Blackburn Rovers	2012–13	Championship	23	1	4	0	1	0	—		28	1
Blackburn Rovers	2013–14	Championship	8	0	0	0	1	0	—		9	0
Blackburn Rovers	2014–15	Championship	41	0	4	0	0	0	—		45	0
Blackburn Rovers	2015–16	Championship	20	0	0	0	0	0	—		20	0
Blackburn Rovers	Total		104	1	8	0	2	0	—		114	1
Derby County	2015–16	Championship	16	1	0	0	0	0	2 (Note: Appearances in Promotion Play-offs)	0	18	1
Derby County	2016–17	Championship	0	1	0	0	2	0	2 (Note: Appearances with Derby County U23)	0	35	0
Derby County	2017–18	Championship	15	0	1	0	0	0	—		16	0
Derby County	2018–19	Championship	0	0	0	0	0	0	1	0	1	0
Derby County	Total		61	1	2	0	2	0	5	0	70	1
Helsingborg	2020	Allsvenskan	11	0	1	0	—		0	0	12	0
Helsingborg	2021	Superettan	0	0	2	0	—		0	0	2	0
Helsingborg	Total		11	0	3	0	—		—		14	0
Halmstad	2022	Superettan	10	0	1	0	—		0	0	11	0
Halmstad	2023	Allsvenskan	17	0	0	0	—		0	0	17	0
Halmstad	Total		27	0	1	0	—		—		28	0
Career total			303	13	19	1	4	0	5	0	318	14

== Honours ==
Individual

- Blackburn Rovers Player of the Year: 2014–15
