= Jonas Henriksson =

Swedish footballer

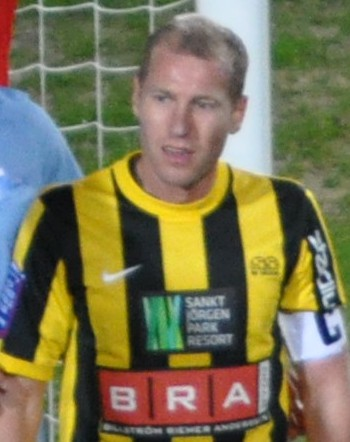

Personal information
- Full name: Pär Johnas Hampus Henriksson
- Date of birth: 29 December 1976 (age 49)
- Place of birth: Gothenburg, Sweden
- Height: 1.75 m (5 ft 9 in)
- Position: Winger

Youth career
- Kärra KIF

Senior career*
Years	Team	Apps	(Gls)
1994–2001	BK Häcken	101	(28)
1996	→ GAIS (loan)	21	(6)
2002–2005	IFK Göteborg	71	(6)
2005–2012	BK Häcken	192	(56)
2013–2019	Grebbestads IF	119	(80)
Total		504	(176)
- * Club domestic league appearances and goals

Pär Johnas Hampus Henriksson (born 29 December 1976) is a Swedish former professional footballer who played as a winger. During his career, he represented BK Häcken, GAIS, IFK Göteborg and Grebbestads IF. After his professional career, he has worked as a sales manager and youth coach for IFK Göteborg. He was a member of the club's board between 2019 and 2025.
