= Lars Jacobsson (footballer) =

Swedish footballer and manager

Lasse Jacobsson
Personal information
- Date of birth: 10 December 1960 (age 65)
- Place of birth: Jönköping, Sweden

Senior career*
Years	Team	Apps	(Gls)
1966–1972	Husqvarna Södra		
1972–1982	IF Reif		
1982–1989	Markaryds IF		

Managerial career
- 1989: Markaryds IF (Youth)
- 1990–1991: Råstorps IF
- 1992–1993: Markaryds IF
- 1994–1996: Älmhults IF
- 1997–1998: IS Halmia
- 1999: Åhus Horna BK
- 2000–2002: Ängelholms FF
- 2003: Markaryds IF
- 2004: Halmstads BK (Asst Manager)
- 2005–2006: Östers IF
- 2008: LB07
- 2009: Halmstads BK (Asst Manager)
- 2010: Halmstads BK
- 2013: Mjällby AIF (Asst Manager)
- 2013–2014: Mjällby AIF
- * Club domestic league appearances and goals

Lasse Jacobsson (born 10 December 1960) is a Swedish football manager and former player.

== Honours ==
=== Managerial ===
Halmstads BK:

- U21 Allsvenskan: 2009
