= Guri Baqaj =

Swedish footballer

Personal information
- Full name: Robert Guri Baqaj
- Date of birth: 12 September 1990 (age 36)
- Place of birth: Skrävlinge, Sweden
- Height: 1.86 m (6 ft 1 in)
- Position: Forward

Team information
- Current team: FC Rosengård

Youth career
- –2007: Malmö FF

Senior career*
Years	Team	Apps	(Gls)
2007	Malmö FF	0	(0)
2008–2009	IF Limhamn Bunkeflo	21	(6)
2009–2012	AlbinoLeffe	0	(0)
2010	→ Halmstads BK (loan)	4	(0)
2011	→ IF Limhamn Bunkeflo (loan)	9	(1)
2012	KSF Prespa Birlik	0	(0)
2013–	FC Rosengård	0	(0)
- * Club domestic league appearances and goals

Robert Guri Baqaj (born 12 September 1990), also known as Guri Baqaj, is a Swedish footballer of Kosovar descent who plays for FC Rosengård as a forward.

== Career ==
Baqaj was signed by Italian Serie B club AlbinoLeffe in 2009 and spent 1-year at its Primavera team. In July 2010, he was loaned to Allsvenskan club Halmstad. and completed on 10 August 2010. He also played two friendlies for Halmstad before available to Halmstad for official matches. He made his league debut on 16 August 2010, substituted Emir Kujović in the second half.

On 23 July 2012, Baqaj signed for Swedish Division 3 club KSF Prespa Birlik.
