= Robin Malmkvist =

Swedish footballer (born 1987)

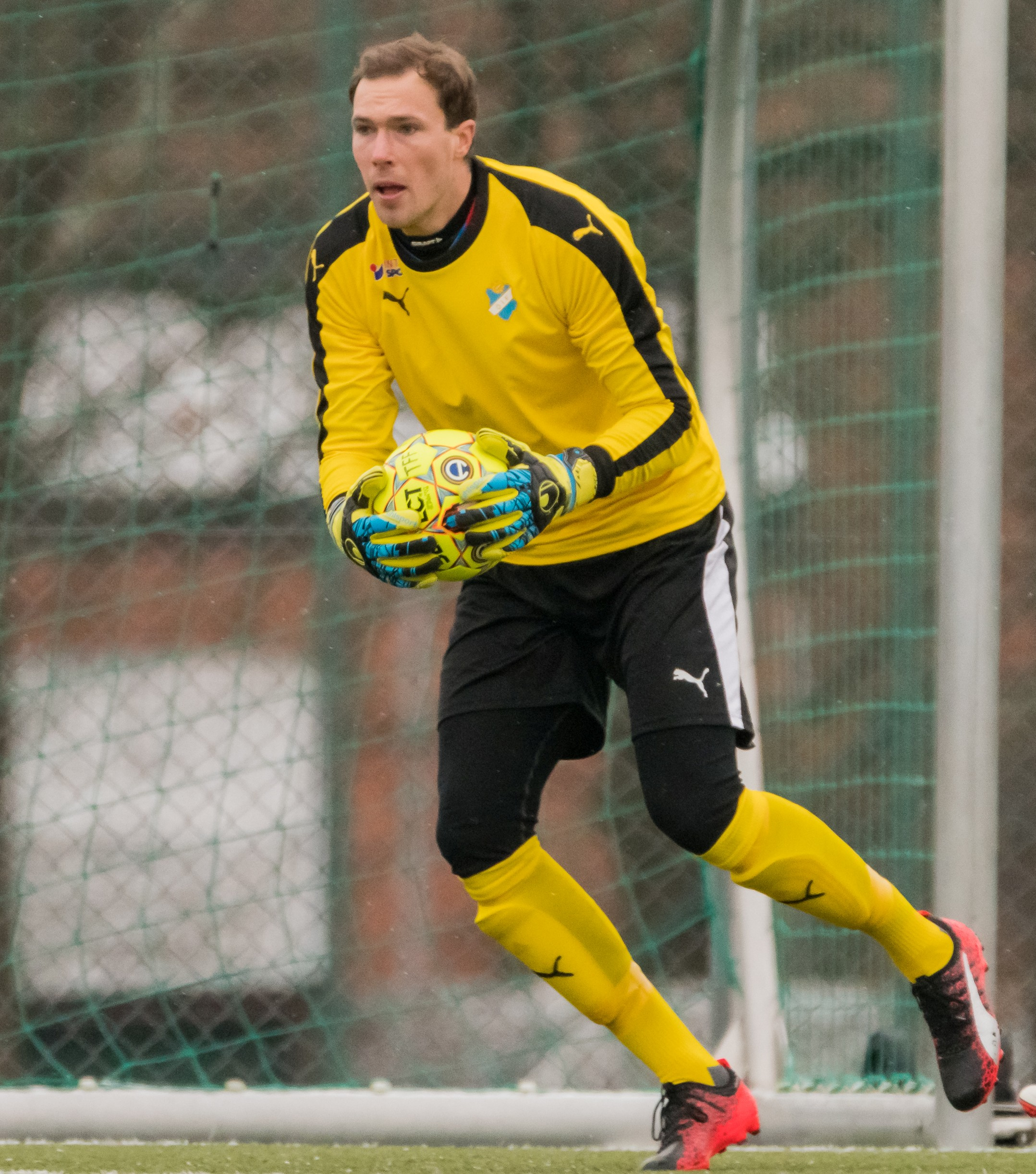
- Malmkvist with Östers IF in 2018

Personal information
- Full name: Frank Robin Malmkvist
- Date of birth: 13 November 1987 (age 38)
- Place of birth: Sweden
- Height: 1.91 m (6 ft 3 in)
- Position: Goalkeeper

Youth career
- 1996–2000: Alvesta GIF
- 2001–2005: Östers IF

Senior career*
Years	Team	Apps	(Gls)
2005–2009	Östers IF	64	(0)
2010–2011	Halmstads BK	24	(0)
2011	→ Tromsø (loan)	7	(0)
2012–2016	Assyriska FF	145	(0)
2017–2019	Östers IF	68	(0)
Total		308	(0)

International career
2006–2007	Sweden U21	2	(0)
- * Club domestic league appearances and goals

Robin Malmkvist (born 13 November 1987) is a Swedish former professional footballer who played as a goalkeeper.

== Career ==
Malmkvist started his career in Alvesta GIF youth team in 1996, staying with the club until 2000 when then moved to Östers IF. He debuted for Öster in 2005, at the age of 17, in Superettan, helping the club reach Allsvenskan. The time in Allsvenskan was only one year and Öster returned to Superettan, however, Malmkvist missed large part of the season due to a cheekbone injury and saw the club get relegated again. While Öster was promoted back to Superettan in 2009, Malmkvist decided to leave the club and signed for Halmstads BK, which were looking for a replacement for departing Magnus Bahne. Malmkvist played the 2011 season on loan at Tromsø, as backup to Marcus Sahlman. Malmkvist played Norwegian and European cup matches for Tromsø, before getting his league debut on 10 July coming on as a first-half substitute for an injured Sahlman away to Vålerenga, a match Tromsø lost 2–0.

On 10 November 2019, he announced his retirement from football.

He represented the Swedish U21 national team in two games.
