= Markus Gustafson =

Swedish footballer

Personal information
- Date of birth: August 12, 1987 (age 39)
- Place of birth: Sweden
- Height: 1.86 m (6 ft 1 in)
- Position: Defender

Team information
- Current team: BK Forward

Youth career
- BK Forward

Senior career*
| Years | Team | Apps | (Gls) |
| –2007 | BK Forward | | |
| 2008–2011 | Halmstads BK | 11 | (0) |
| 2012– | BK Forward | 23 | (0) |
- * Club domestic league appearances and goals as of 21 November 2012

Markus Gustafson (born August 12, 1987) is a Swedish football player, currently out of contract who plays as a defender.

Started his career in BK Forward before moving to Halmstads BK in 2008, he made his debut for the club in 2009 away against Malmö FF, when he came on as a substitute for Tomas Žvirgždauskas in the 93 minute on 20 June, he has also played 3 cup games. After Halmstad relegation in 2011, Gustafson's contract expired and he left the club.
