= Mattias Adelstam =

Swedish footballer

Personal information
- Full name: Mattias Adelstam
- Date of birth: 7 March 1982 (age 44)
- Place of birth: Malmö, Sweden
- Height: 1.83 m (6 ft 0 in)
- Position: Forward

Youth career
- BK Olympic

Senior career*
Years	Team	Apps	(Gls)
2002	Ängelholms FF	0	(0)
2003	Helsingborg Södra BIS		
2004	Asmundtorps IF		
2005	Helsingborg Södra BIS	19	(11)
2006	Bunkeflo IF	6	(2)
2006	→ IFK Hässleholm (loan)		
2007–2009	Ängelholms FF	84	(51)
2010–2012	Trelleborgs FF	72	(10)
2012–2013	Hammarby IF	33	(6)
2014	HIF Akademi	13	(12)
2014	Landskrona BoIS	13	(2)
2018	IFK Rössjöholm		

Managerial career
- 2019–: Ängelholms FF (assistant)
- * Club domestic league appearances and goals as of 10 August 2015

Mattias Adelstam (born 7 March 1982) is a Swedish retired footballer who played for many Swedish clubs as a forward, mainly in Superettan. He became the top scorer in Superettan while playing for Ängelholms FF in 2009.

== Honours ==
=== Individual ===
- Superettan Top Scorer: 2009
