= Tomas Žvirgždauskas =

Lithuanian footballer

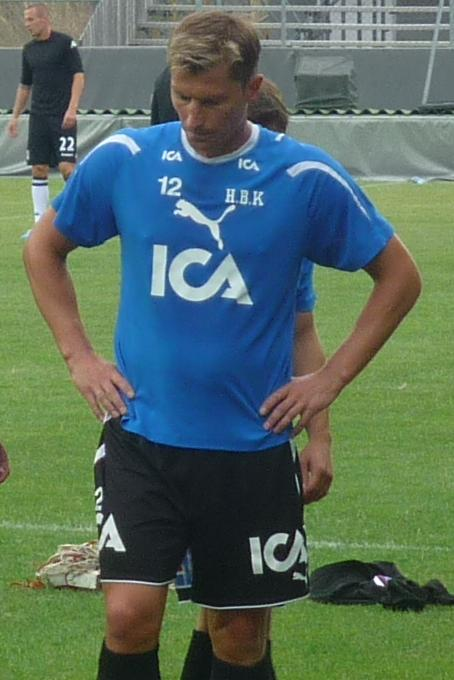
- Tomas Žvirgždauskas in 2010

Personal information
- Full name: Tomas Žvirgždauskas
- Date of birth: 18 March 1975 (age 51)
- Place of birth: Vilnius, Lithuanian SSR, Soviet Union
- Height: 1.87 m (6 ft 1 1/2 in)
- Position: Defender

Youth career
- –1990: Žalgiris

Senior career*
Years	Team	Apps	(Gls)
1991–1995	Žalgiris	38	(1)
1995–1996	Næstved	4	(0)
1996	Žalgiris	12	(1)
1997–2001	Polonia Warsaw	112	(0)
2001–2002	Widzew Łódź	10	(1)
2002–2011	Halmstad	211	(6)

International career
1995–1997	Lithuania U21		
1998–2011	Lithuania	56	(0)
- * Club domestic league appearances and goals

Tomas Žvirgždauskas (born 18 March 1975) is a Lithuanian former professional footballer who played as a defender.

== Career ==
His career started in Žalgiris, where he won the Lithuanian league title twice. In 1995, he moved to Danish team, Naestved, but only played a few games before moving back to Žalgiris the following year. His return to Lithuania was short, as he moved yet again shortly thereafter to Polish Ekstraklasa outfit Polonia Warsaw in January 1997, where he won the title. He later played a short period for Widzew Łódź, then going on a trial at the Israeli club, Hapoel Be'er Sheva, but failed to get a contract. In September 2002, he signed a contract with the Swedish club, Halmstad. Žvirgždauskas formed along with Tommy Jönsson a long lasting central defence at Halmstad, lasting until 2009 as Johnny Lundberg arrived at the club, he then created a defence with Lundberg, taking over Jönssons position on the left of the central part of the defence. As Lundberg suffered a severe injury in 2011, Žvirgždauskas had to pair up with rising talent Richard Magyar. Prior to the 2012 season Halmstads announced that they would not renew Žvirgždauskas' contract and he would leave the club, he had then played 307 matches for Halmstads.

In 2006, he received a one-month ban after assaulting IK Brage forward, Mats Theander, in a friendly match.

== International career ==
Žvirgždauskas started his national career for Lithuania in 1998 with a friendly against Azerbaijan. Eventually becoming a starting player in the national team until his retiring in 2008. He however returned to the national team in 2011 for a friendly against Poland and was an unused substitute in the UEFA Euro 2012 qualifying match against Spain at home.

Žvirgždauskas made 56 appearances for Lithuania senior national team.

== Personal life ==
He lives with his wife, Aorsra, and their two children, Patricia and Jostas. His father died in 1993 due to a heart attack.

In his youth, he played basketball. While his father wanted him to be a boxer, he stopped when his mother, a doctor, forbade him, due to her fear of seeing him get hurt.

In every league he has played he has used nicknames rather than his own last name due to pronunciation difficulties, in Lithuania he was called Žvirgždas, in Poland Zvirac and in Sweden Zvirre.

== Honours ==
Žalgiris

- A Lyga: 1991, 1991–92
- Lithuanian Football Cup: 1991, 1992–93, 1993–94

Polonia Warsaw

- Ekstraklasa: 1999–2000
- Polish Cup: 2000–01
- Polish Super Cup: 2000
