= Magnus Andersson (footballer, born 1981) =

Swedish footballer, born 1981

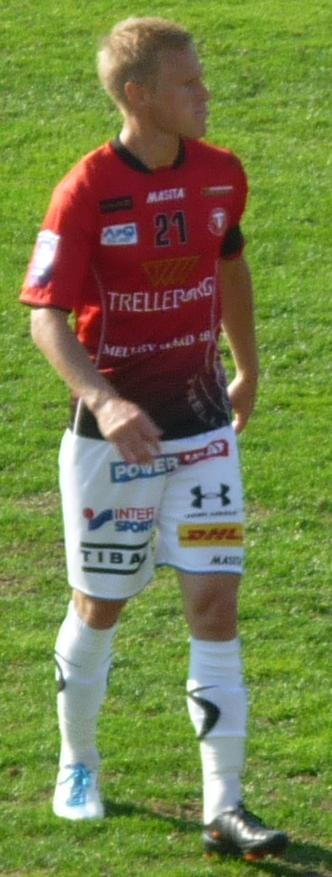
- Magnus Andersson in 2011

Personal information
- Full name: Magnus Andersson
- Date of birth: 27 April 1981 (age 45)
- Place of birth: Sweden
- Height: 1.81 m (5 ft 11 in)
- Position: Centre back

Team information
- Current team: Trelleborgs FF (assistant)

Youth career
- 2000: Hillerstorps GoIF

Senior career*
Years	Team	Apps	(Gls)
2001	IFK Värnamo		
2002–2006	Halmstads BK	89	(11)
2007–2017	Trelleborgs FF	277	(29)
2018	Trelleborgs FF	3	(0)

International career
2002	Sweden U-21	1	(0)

Managerial career
- 2018–: Trelleborgs FF (assistant)
- * Club domestic league appearances and goals

Magnus Andersson (born 27 April 1981) is a Swedish retired footballer who played as a defender and current assistant manager of Trelleborgs FF.

== Career ==
Andersson started his career in Hillerstorps GoIF alongside Patrik Ingelsten. In 2001, he moved to IFK Värnamo, but only stayed for 1 season before following manager Jonas Thern to Halmstads BK. Andersson was mainly used as a substitute until the 2005 season, however an ACL injury destroyed his season, and he returned only to obtain the same injury during the 2006 season.

In 2007, he left Halmstads BK for Trelleborgs FF where he played until he retired in 2017. He continued at the club as assistant manager, after having already been a part of the club's coaching staff since 2015. He came out of retirement on 22 April 2018, due to injuries in the squad, playing the whole game as Trelleborg lost 0–1 to Kalmar FF on home ground. Andersson played two games further in the 2018 season.
