= Joe Sise =

Swedish footballer

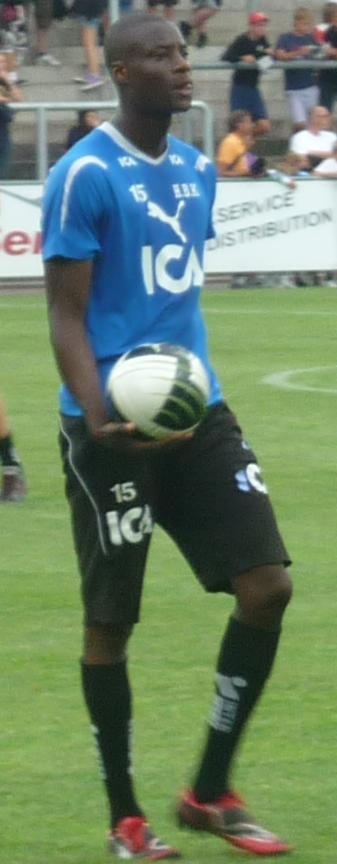
- Joe Sise in 2010

Personal information
- Full name: Joe Sise
- Date of birth: 12 December 1989 (age 36)
- Place of birth: Halmstad, Sweden
- Height: 1.92 m (6 ft 4 in)
- Positions: Forward; winger

Youth career
- Snöstorp Nyhem FF

Senior career*
Years	Team	Apps	(Gls)
2004–2008	Snöstorp Nyhem FF	90	(31)
2008	→ IFK Värnamo (loan)	13	(4)
2008–2011	Halmstads BK	58	(11)
2012–2014	FC Nordsjælland	0	(0)
2016–2018	IS Halmia	15	(12)
2018	Landskrona BoIS	5	(0)

International career^{‡}
2010	Sweden U21	2	(0)
- * Club domestic league appearances and goals as of 12 November 2018 ‡ National team caps and goals as of 19 August 2009

Joe Sise (born 12 December 1989) is a Swedish footballer of Gambian descent, who either plays as a winger or forward.

== Career ==
Starting his career in Snöstorp Nyhem FF, a minor club in the town of Halmstad, he took the step up in to the senior team in 2004 at the age of 15. In spring 2008 he went on loan to IFK Värnamo as he finished his studies at the local football gymnasium. During the summer transfer window Sise signed for local rivals Halmstads BK, making his debut against GIF Sundsvall on 24 October 2008, the game ending 0–0.

Prior to signing for Halmstads BK, Sise had been on trial with AC Milan and Manisaspor.

Following the end of the 2011 season, Sise announced he would not sign a new contract with Halmstads BK and follow the club in its relegation to Superettan. Following the end of Sise's contract, there was speculation about where he would play next. In mid-October, a person named Can Arikboga claimed to be Sise's agent and told German newspaper Bild that the player would soon sign with Hansa Rostock in 2. Bundesliga. However, 2 days after the rumor arose Sise told the local newspaper Hallandsposten that he had no idea of who Arikboga was, but added that he was certainly not Sise's agent, stating that he been a victim of an agent fraud.

On 25 January 2012, the Danish club FC Nordsjælland announced that they had signed a 3-year contract with Joe Sise.
