= Kujtim Bala =

Swedish footballer of Kosovar descent

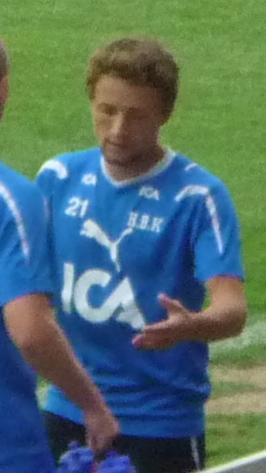
- Kujtim Bala in 2010

Personal information
- Date of birth: 24 May 1990 (age 36)
- Place of birth: Sweden
- Height: 1.66 m (5 ft 5 1/2 in)
- Position: Defender

Youth career
- –2004: Veddige BK
- 2005–2009: Halmstads BK

Senior career*
Years	Team	Apps	(Gls)
2007	Varbergs BoIS		
2008–2011	Halmstads BK	20	(1)
2012–2014	Varbergs BoIS	51	(1)
2015	Östersunds FK	20	(1)
2016	IK Sirius	11	(0)
2016–2017	Dalkurd FF	36	(3)

International career
2010	Kosovo	1	(1)
- * Club domestic league appearances and goals

Kujtim Bala (born 25 May 1990) is a Swedish former footballer of Kosovar descent.

== Career ==
Starting his career in Veddige BK, he moved at the age of 15 to Halmstads BK in 2005. In 2007, he made a one-year stay in Varbergs BoIS FC before returning to Halmstads BK the following year and on 12 July 2009 he made his debut for the senior team against GAIS when he came on as a substitute for Christian Järdler in the 59th minute.

On 16 November 2009 he was raised from the youth squad and was given a place in the senior team.

In the 2011 season Bala featured 19 times for Halmstads BK scoring once. After the season his contract expired and he decided to rejoin his former club Varbergs BoIS FC. However the season was immediately cut short as he suffered an ACL injury even before the pre-season had started.

== National team ==
Kujtim Bala was called up to Kosovo national team for an exhibition game against his club Halmstads BK on 10 June 2010, along with his teammate Anel Raskaj. Bala started the game on the bench and came on in 60th minute and scored Kosovos fourth goal in the 71st minute.

== Honours ==
=== Club ===
Halmstads BK

- Allsvenskan U21: 2009
