= Alexander Prent =

Dutch footb DOVO aller (born 1983)

Personal information
- Date of birth: 25 May 1983 (age 43)
- Place of birth: Utrecht, Netherlands
- Height: 1.78 m (5 ft 10 in)
- Position: Winger

Youth career
- SV Saestum
- DOVO
- NEC

Senior career*
Years	Team	Apps	(Gls)
2004–2007	NEC	25	(0)
2006–2007	→ TOP Oss (loan)	28	(5)
2008–2010	Halmstads BK	32	(2)
2011	Cambuur	12	(1)
2011–2012	SHB Đà Nẵng	16	(2)
2013–2016	JVC Cuijk	49	(9)
2016–2017	DUNO		
2017–2018	SC Oranje		
2018	Breukelen		
2018–2022	VV Jonathan		
- * Club domestic league appearances and goals as of 13 September 2020 (UTC)

Alexander Prent (born 25 May 1983) is a Dutch footballer who plays as a winger.

== Career ==
He played for several minor clubs in his home town before being signed by NEC Nijmegen. Prent played for the youth-team until season 2004-05 when he moved up to the senior team. During the next season 2005–2006 he suffered a knee injury that only made him play 7 games for the club, NEC loaned him out to TOP Oss in the Eerste Divisie during season 2006–2007.

In the autumn of 2007 he spent a few days on trial with Halmstads BK and played a friendly against FC Nordsjælland, in which he scored a goal, and then, on 7 December 2007, he signed for the club and joined them in January 2008. Near the end of the 2010 season, it was reported that Prent would not get his contract renewed and he left Halmstads BK at the end of the season.

On 15 February 2011 Prent returned to the Netherlands as he signed for SC Cambuur in Eerste Divisie, he had previously been on trial with German club Dynamo Dresden failing to gain a contract.

On 10 December 2011, Prent was signed to V-League side SHB Đà Nẵng.
