= Jónas Guðni Sævarsson =

Icelandic footballer

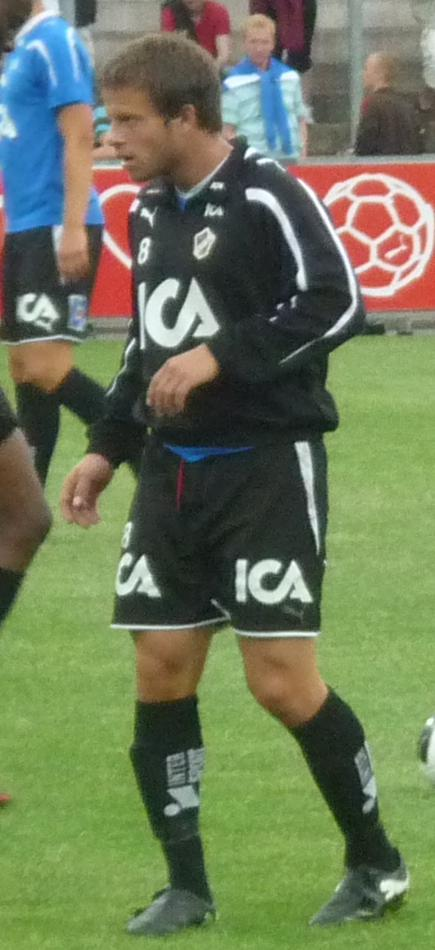
- Jónas Guðni Sævarsson in 2010

Personal information
- Date of birth: 28 November 1983 (age 42)
- Place of birth: Iceland
- Height: 1.70 m (5 ft 7 in)
- Position: Midfielder

Team information
- Current team: Keflavík
- Number: 5

Youth career
- Keflavík

Senior career*
Years	Team	Apps	(Gls)
2002–2007	Keflavík	97	(2)
2008–2009	KR Reykjavík	35	(3)
2009–2012	Halmstads BK	54	(5)
2012–2015	KR Reykjavík	14	(1)
2015–	Keflavík	13	(3)

International career^{‡}
1999	Iceland U17	9	(0)
2001	Iceland U19	4	(0)
2004–2005	Iceland U21	7	(0)
2008–	Iceland	7	(2)
- * Club domestic league appearances and goals as of 18:45, 27 July 2016 (UTC) ‡ National team caps and goals as of 19 January 2010

Jónas Guðni Sævarsson (born 28 November 1983) is an Icelandic footballer who currently plays for Keflavík as a midfielder.

== Career ==
=== Club ===
He started his career in Keflavík. In 2007, he left that club for Úrvalsdeild rivals KR Reykjavík; he stayed with them until summer 2009, when he signed for Swedish club Halmstads BK. He made his debut for them on 27 July 2009 when he came on as a substitute against Malmö FF, a 0–3 defeat. Sævarsson returned to KR in 2012. He remained at the club for three seasons, before re-signing for his first club Keflavík in November 2015.

=== International ===
Shortly after his move to KR Reykjavíkur he also made his debut for the Icelandic national team. He scored his two goals for the national team against Brazil and England.

== Honours ==
=== Club ===
KR Reykjavíkur

- Icelandic Cup: 2008

Keflavík

- Icelandic Cup: 2006
