= Mikael Rosén =

Swedish footballer (born 1974)

- Mikael Rosén in 2008

Personal information
- Full name: Mikael Rosén
- Date of birth: August 15, 1974 (age 52)
- Place of birth: Sweden
- Height: 1.86 m (6 ft 1 in)
- Positions: Defender; midfielder

Youth career
- 1991: Fågelsta AIF

Senior career*
Years	Team	Apps	(Gls)
1992–1996	Motala AIF	93	(6)
1997–2000	Halmstads BK	96	(3)
2001–2003	Helsingborgs IF	77	(6)
2004–2006	Viborg FF	77	(3)
2006–2011	Halmstads BK	132	(9)

International career^{‡}
1999–2003	Sweden	3	(0)
- * Club domestic league appearances and goals as of 20:51, 14 March 2010 (UTC) ‡ National team caps and goals as of 17:45, 19 August 2009 (UTC)

Mikael Rosén (born Mikael Gustavsson on August 15, 1974) is a Swedish former football player.

== Career ==
Started his career in Motala AIF in 1992, he then moved in 1997 to Halmstads BK and played with the club until 2000, during this time he gained 1 medal every season of different values, in 2001 he signed for the rival team Helsingborgs IF, in 2003 he was offered an extension of his contract with Helsingborg, Allsvenska rival AIK also showed interest in signing him, he however signed a 2-year contract with Danish team Viborg FF, in 2005 he agreed on a one-year extension of his contract with Viborg, he however did not complete the contract as he during the summer of 2006 signed for his old club Halmstads BK.

He stayed with Halmstad for another six seasons. After the relegation to Superettan his contract expired and he left the club.

He has been given the nickname Gus after his second name which he was born with.

== Achievements ==
Halmstads BK:

- Allsvenskan:
  - Champion: 1997, 2000
  - Lilla silvret (3rd): 1999
  - Bronze: 1998

Helsingborgs IF:

- Allsvenskan:
  - Bronze: 2002
