= Christian Järdler =

Swedish footballer and manager

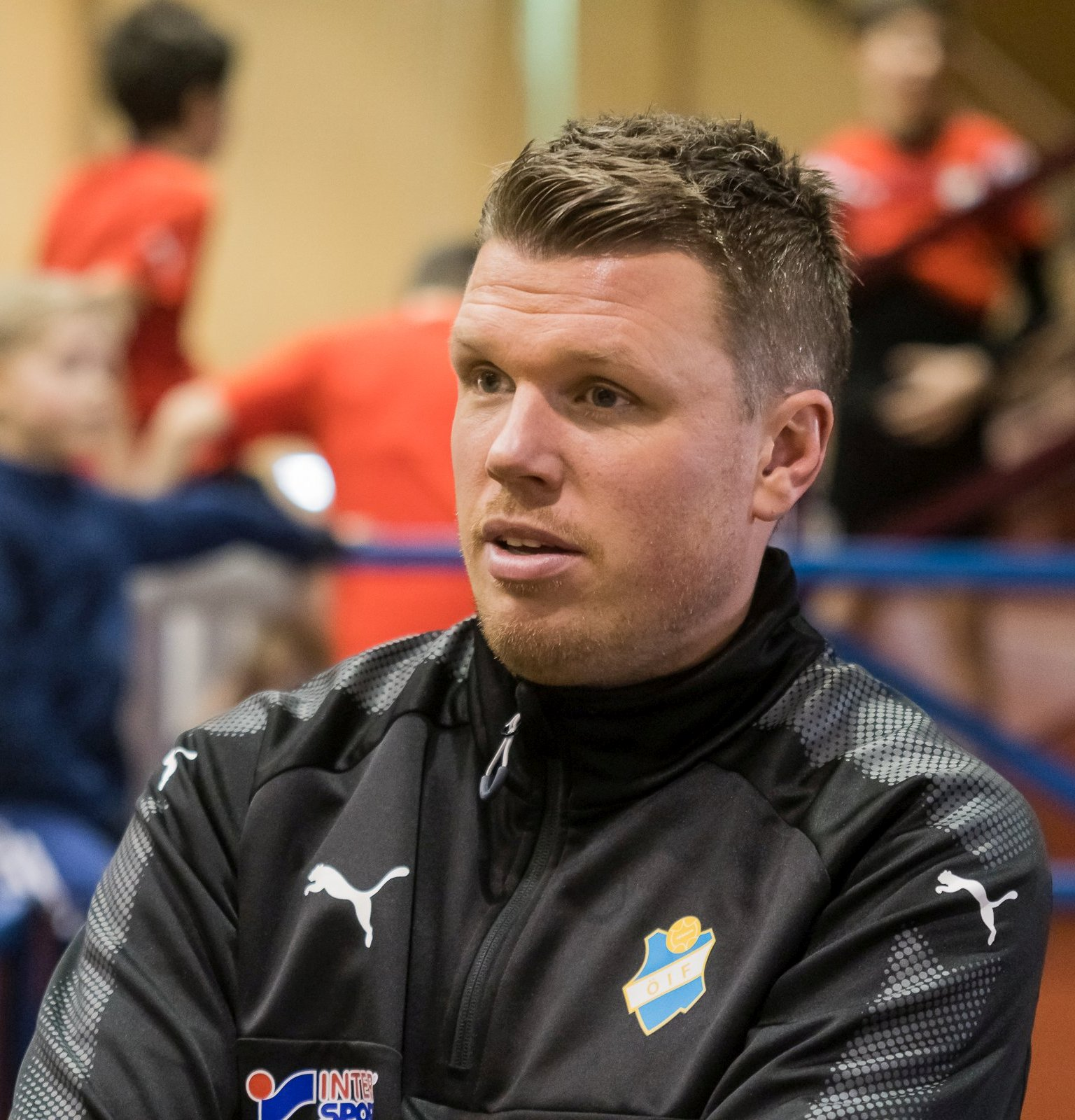
- Christian Järdler in 2018

Personal information
- Date of birth: 3 June 1982 (age 44)
- Place of birth: Sweden
- Height: 1.84 m (6 ft 0 in)
- Positions: Left wing-back; midfielder

Youth career
- Ängelholms FF

Senior career*
Years	Team	Apps	(Gls)
1999	Ängelholms FF	20	(1)
2000–2005	Helsingborgs IF	78	(8)
2005	Gençlerbirliği S.K.	12	(0)
2006–2008	Malmö FF	47	(2)
2009–2013	Halmstads BK	75	(1)
Total		232	(12)

International career
2003–2004	Sweden U21	5	(0)

Managerial career
- 2014–2015: Ängelholms FF (head of youth)
- 2015–2016: Ängelholms FF
- 2017: IFK Värnamo
- 2018–2019: Östers IF
- 2020–2021: Mjällby AIF (assistant)
- 2021: Mjällby AIF
- 2022: Örebro SK (assistant)
- 2022–2024: Örebro SK
- * Club domestic league appearances and goals

Christian Järdler (born 3 June 1982) is a Swedish manager and former footballer.

== Career ==
Starting his career in Ängelholms FF, he then moved at the age of 17 to Helsingborgs IF, after being on trial at Halmstads BK. During the middle of the 2005 season he decided to leave Helsingborg and sign for Turkish side Gençlerbirliği. However, his spell with the club lasted only for half a season before Järdler returned home to Sweden and Malmö FF. During his time in Malmö, he suffered a serious injury in a league match against Hammarby IF, when he collided with teammate Raoul Kouakou. The collision resulted in a broken cheekbone and a severe headache, which haunted him afterwards.

In early 2009 Järdler left Malmö FF and signed for league rival Halmstads BK. Järdler competed primarily with Per "Texas" Johansson over the leftback position, and when "Texas" left Halmstad after the 2010 season he became the regular at the position. The start of the 2011 season was a nightmare for Järdler as the headaches returned and forced him miss half the season. Despite his return, the club was relegated by the end of the season. As Halmstad set to play in Superettan 2012, Järdler decided to stay and help the club return to Allsvenskan, and when the season was over he decided to sign a new contract with the club. In the middle of 2013 Järdler was left out of the match squad for unknown reasons. He later confirmed that the headache had returned following a clash during training, which had frightened him. On 12 September 2013 Järdler announced his immediate retirement from football due to his headaches.

== Personal life ==
His father, Ingemar Järdler, also played for Halmstads BK, between 1977 and 1978.
