= Tommy Jönsson =

Swedish footballer

- Tommy Jönsson playing Halmstads BK during friendly against Reading F.C. in July 2008

Personal information
- Full name: Ulf Tommy Jönsson
- Date of birth: March 4, 1976 (age 50)
- Place of birth: Lomma, Sweden
- Height: 1.85 m (6 ft 1 in)
- Position: Defender

Youth career
- –1991: GIF Nike

Senior career*
Years	Team	Apps	(Gls)
1992–1997	Malmö FF	72	(2)
1998–2010	Halmstads BK	304	(29)
Total		376	(31)

International career
1991–1992	Sweden U16	7	(0)
1992–1994	Sweden U18	18	(1)
1995–1998	Sweden U21	30	(2)
2003	Sweden	3	(0)
- * Club domestic league appearances and goals

Ulf Tommy Jönsson (born 4 March 1976) is a Swedish former footballer who played as defender. He represented Malmö FF and Halmstads BK during a career that spanned between 1992 and 2010. A full international in 2003, he won three caps for the Sweden national team.

== Club career ==
Jönsson started his career in the club GIF Nike and at the age of 16 he moved to Malmö FF, where he played for 6 years, until in 1998 when he decided to go to Halmstads BK. 2003 he was chosen as Halmstads BK's team captain, he succeeded Petter Hansson, prior to the 2010 season he was replaced as teamcaptain by Johnny Lundberg.

On 2 July 2008 against Hammarby IF, 1-1, he played his 400th match for Halmstads BK, of which 245 matches were played in Allsvenskan and 155 were played in Svenska Cupen. At the end of the 2010 season Tommy Jönsson announced that he retired from football after 12 years in Halmstads BK and chose to pursue a career outside football as a financial adviser instead. He retired with less than 2 matches away from holding the record as most matches played for the club. The current holder is Torbjörn Arvidsson

== International career ==
Jönsson represented Sweden three times in 2003. He was part of the starting line-up against both Qatar, victory 3-2, and Thailand, victory 4-1, and then coming on as a substitute against Croatia, defeat 1-2.

== Honours ==
Halmstads BK:

- Allsvenskan: 2000

Sweden

- King's Cup: 2003
