= 2007 Halmstads BK season =

Halmstads BK
2007 season
- Chairman: (Sweden) Arne Ekstrand
- Manager: (Sweden) Janne Andersson
- Allsvenskan: 7th
- Svenska Cupen: 3rd round
- Top goalscorer: League: Dusan Djuric (7); All: Dusan Djuric (7)
- Highest home attendance: 11,029 vs IF Elfsborg (3 July)
- Lowest home attendance: 4,235 vs Kalmar FF (22 April)

== Squad ==
=== First-team squad ===
As of 1 September 2008. Note: Flags indicate national team as defined under FIFA eligibility rules; some limited exceptions apply. Players may hold more than one non-FIFA nationality.

No.	Pos.	Nation	Player
1	GK	(Sweden) SWE	Conny Johansson
2	DF	(Sweden) SWE	Per Johansson
3	DF	(Sweden) SWE	Jesper Westerberg
4	DF	(Sweden) SWE	Tommy Jönsson (Captain)
5	MF	(Sweden) SWE	Hasse Mattisson
6	DF	(Sweden) SWE	Mikael Rosén
7	MF	(Sweden) SWE	Martin Fribrock
8	FW	(Sweden) SWE	Ajsel Kujovic
9	MF	(Sweden) SWE	Sebastian Johansson
10	FW	(Sweden) SWE	Magnus Arvidsson
12	DF	(Lithuania) LTU	Tomas Žvirgždauskas

No.	Pos.	Nation	Player
13	MF	(Sweden) SWE	Andreas Johansson
14	MF	(Sweden) SWE	Dusan Djuric
15	MF	(Sweden) SWE	Peter Larsson
16	MF	(Finland) FIN	Tim Sparv
17	MF	(Sweden) SWE	Hjalmar Öhagen
18	MF	(Sweden) SWE	Björn Anklev
20	GK	(Finland) FIN	Magnus Bahne
21	DF	(Sweden) SWE	Tibor Joza
22	GK	(Kazakhstan) KAZ	David Loriya
23	DF	(Sweden) SWE	Emil Jensen
24	MF	(Kosovo) KOS	Anel Raskaj

== Transfers ==
=== In ===
Note: Flags indicate national team as defined under FIFA eligibility rules; some limited exceptions apply. Players may hold more than one non-FIFA nationality.

No.	Pos.	Nation	Player
17	MF	(Sweden) SWE	Hjalmar Öhagen (from Sandvikens IF)
16	MF	(Finland) FIN	Tim Sparv (from Southampton F.C.)
20	GK	(Finland) FIN	Magnus Bahne (from Inter Turku)
—	FW	(Sweden) SWE	Emir Kujovic (from Landskrona BoIS)
22	GK	(Kazakhstan) KAZ	David Loriya (from FC Shakhter)
24	MF	(Kosovo) KOS	Anel Raskaj (from Halmstads BK youth squad)

=== Out ===
Note: Flags indicate national team as defined under FIFA eligibility rules; some limited exceptions apply. Players may hold more than one non-FIFA nationality.

No.	Pos.	Nation	Player
—	MF	(Sweden) SWE	Magnus Svensson (to Vinbergs IF)
—	MF	(Brazil) BRA	Delani (released as a free agent)
—	FW	(Sweden) SWE	Magnus Andersson (to Trelleborgs FF)
—	DF	(Sweden) SWE	Joel Borgstrand (to BK Astrio)
—	MF	(Sweden) SWE	Kristoffer Fagerkrantz (to Falkenbergs FF)
—	FW	(Sweden) SWE	Patrik Ingelsten (to Kalmar FF)
—	FW	(Sweden) SWE	Emra Tahirović (to Lille)
—	FW	(Sweden) SWE	Joel Johansson (to Falkenbergs FF)

=== Out on loan ===
Note: Flags indicate national team as defined under FIFA eligibility rules; some limited exceptions apply. Players may hold more than one non-FIFA nationality.

No.	Pos.	Nation	Player
—	MF	(Sweden) SWE	Kristoffer Fagerkrantz (to Falkenbergs FF)
—	FW	(Sweden) SWE	Emir Kujovic (to Falkenbergs FF)
—	GK	(Sweden) SWE	Marcus Sahlman (to Trelleborgs FF)

== Appearances and goals ==
Last updated on 21 July 2008.

No.	Pos	Nat	Player	Total		Allsvenskan		Svenska Cupen	
No.	Pos	Nat	Player	Apps	Goals	Apps	Goals	Apps	Goals
1	GK	(Sweden) SWE	Conny Johansson	1	0	1	0	0	0
2	DF	(Sweden) SWE	Per Johansson	10	1	10	1	0	0
3	DF	(Sweden) SWE	Jesper Westerberg	16	1	16	1	0	0
4	DF	(Sweden) SWE	Tommy Jönsson	21	3	21	3	0	0
5	MF	(Sweden) SWE	Hasse Mattisson	23	1	23	1	0	0
6	DF	(Sweden) SWE	Mikael Rosén	23	4	23	4	0	0
7	MF	(Sweden) SWE	Martin Fribrock	20	2	20	2	0	0
8	FW	(Sweden) SWE	Ajsel Kujovic	20	2	20	2	0	0
9	FW	(Sweden) SWE	Sebastian Johansson	10	0	10	0	0	0
10	FW	(Sweden) SWE	Magnus Arvidsson	26	5	26	5	0	0
12	DF	(Lithuania) LTU	Tomas Zvirgzdauskas	25	2	25	2	0	0
13	MF	(Sweden) SWE	Andreas Johansson	25	0	25	0	0	0
14	MF	(Sweden) SWE	Dusan Djuric	24	7	24	7	0	0
15	DF	(Sweden) SWE	Peter Larsson	23	0	23	0	0	0
16	MF	(Finland) FIN	Tim Sparv	12	0	12	0	0	0
17	MF	(Sweden) SWE	Hjalmar Öhagen	15	0	15	0	0	0
18	MF	(Sweden) SWE	Björn Anklev	19	0	19	0	0	0
20	GK	(Finland) FIN	Magnus Bahne	20	0	19	0	1	0
21	MF	(Sweden) SWE	Tibor Joza	5	0	5	0	0	0
22	MF	(Kazakhstan) KAZ	David Loriya	7	0	7	0	0	0
23	DF	(Sweden) SWE	Emil Jensen	0	0	0	0	0	0
24	MF	(Kosovo) KOS	Anel Raskaj	3	0	3	0	0	0

== Pre-season ==
27 January 2007 Match 1	(Sweden) Halmstads BK	1 – 2	Brøndby IF (Denmark)	Sannarps IP, Halmstad
	Tomas Zvirgzdauskas 84'	(Report) (in Swedish)	Mads Jørgensen 59' 62'	Attendance: N/A; Referee: Per-Anders Andersson

3 February 2007 Match 2	(Denmark) FC Nordsjælland	1 – 1	Halmstads BK (Sweden)	Farum Park, Farum
	N/A 72'	(Report) (in Swedish)	Ajsel Kujovic 82'	Attendance: N/A; Referee: N/A

6 February 2007 Match 3	(Sweden) Halmstads BK	1 – 1	Mjällby AIF (Sweden)	Sannarps IP, Halmstad
	Björn Anklev 47'	(Report) (in Swedish)	Marcus Lindberg 25'	Attendance: N/A; Referee: Peter Hallengren

13 February 2007 Match 4	(Sweden) Halmstads BK	5 – 0	Falkenbergs FF (Sweden)	Sannarps IP, Halmstad
	Ajsel Kujovic 30'; Hjalmar Öhagen 51' 55'; Magnus Arvidsson 80'; Björn Anklev 82'	(Report) (in Swedish)		Attendance: N/A; Referee: Mikael Lerjéus

17 February 2007 Match 5	(Sweden) Halmstads BK	0 – 0	Trelleborgs FF (Sweden)	Sannarps IP, Halmstad
		(Report) (in Swedish)		Attendance: N/A; Referee: Miro Ukalovic

24 February 2007 Match 6	(Sweden) Halmstads BK	1 – 0	Örgryte IS (Sweden)	Sannarps IP, Halmstad
	Dusan Djuric 49'	(Report) (in Swedish)		Attendance: N/A; Referee: Antti Kanerva

1 March 2007 Match 7	(Sweden) Halmstads BK	3 – 4	BK Häcken (Sweden)	Sannarps IP, Halmstad
	Magnus Arvidsson 2'; Andreas Johansson 32'; Joel Johansson 34'	(Report) (in Swedish)	Ari Skúlason 17'; Hans Berggren 39' 69'; Daniel Larsson 61'	Attendance: N/A; Referee: Per-Anders Andersson

15 March 2007 Match 8	(Italy) Montichiari	0 – 1	Halmstads BK (Sweden)	Montichiari
		(Report) (in Swedish)	Martin Fribrock 44' (pen.)	Attendance: N/A; Referee: N/A

24 March 2007 Match 9	(Norway) Stabaek IF	0 – 0	Halmstads BK (Sweden)	Oslo
		(Report) (in Swedish)		Attendance: N/A; Referee: N/A

29 March 2007 Match 10	(Sweden) Kalmar FF	1 – 0	Halmstads BK (Sweden)	Loverslund
	Ricardo Santos 73'	(Report) (in Swedish)		Attendance: N/A; Referee: Martin Hansson

1 April 2007 Match 11	(Sweden) Halmstads BK	0 – 1	Malmö FF (Sweden)	Örjans Vall, Halmstad
		(Report) (in Swedish)	Júnior 6'	Attendance: 991; Referee: Åke Andreasson

15 November 2007 Match 12	(Denmark) FC Nordsjælland	2 – 4	Halmstads BK (Sweden)	Værløse Stadion, Værløse
	Thomas Lindrup 1'; Kenni Olsen 36'	(Report) (in Swedish)	Peter Larsson 28'; Sebastian Johansson 33'; Mikael Rosén 48'; Alexander Prent 62'	Attendance: N/A; Referee: N/A

== Allsvenskan ==
Pos	Team	Pld	W	D	L	GF	GA	GD	Pts
5	AIK	26	10	8	8	30	27	+3	38
6	Hammarby IF	26	11	3	12	35	31	+4	36
7	Halmstads BK	26	9	9	8	33	41	−8	36
8	Helsingborgs IF	26	9	8	9	49	37	+12	35
9	Malmö FF	26	9	7	10	29	28	+1	34

Source: svenskfotboll.se (in Swedish)
Rules for classification: 1) points; 2) goal difference; 3) number of goals scored.

9 April 2007 Match 1	Halmstads BK	2 – 1	Helsingborgs IF	Örjans Vall, Halmstad
	Tomas Zvirgzdauskas 49'; Emra Tahirović 73'	(Report) (in Swedish)	Razak Omotoyossi 48'	Attendance: 8,684; Referee: Peter Fröjdfeldt

16 April 2007 Match 2	Djurgårdens IF	2 – 0	Halmstads BK	Stockholm Stadium, Stockholm
	Jones Kusi-Asare 32'; Mikael Dahlberg 85'	(Report) (in Swedish)		Attendance: 10,747; Referee: Markus Strömbergsson

22 April 2007 Match 3	Halmstads BK	2 – 1	Kalmar FF	Örjans Vall, Halmstad
	Magnus Arvidsson 44' 74'	(Report) (in Swedish)	Peter Larsson 32' (o.g.)	Attendance: 4,235; Referee: Håkan Jonasson

30 April 2007 Match 4	IFK Göteborg	1 – 1	Halmstads BK	Ullevi, Gothenburg
	Pontus Wernbloom 43'	(Report) (in Swedish)	Emra Tahirović 3'	Attendance: 8,320; Referee: Martin Ingvarsson

7 May 2007 Match 5	GAIS	2 – 1	Halmstads BK	Ullevi, Gothenburg
	Anton Holmberg 55' 64'	(Report) (in Swedish)	Dusan Djuric 83'	Attendance: 3,798; Referee: Daniel Stålhammar

14 May 2007 Match 6	Halmstads BK	1 – 0	Trelleborgs FF	Örjans Vall, Halmstad
	Emra Tahirović 45'	(Report) (in Swedish)		Attendance: 4,429; Referee: Jonas Eriksson

21 May 2007 Match 7	AIK	1 – 1	Halmstads BK	Råsunda, Stockholm
	Marcus Johnsson 34'	(Report) (in Swedish)	Martin Fribrock 51'	Attendance: 14,141; Referee: Håkan Jonasson

28 May 2007 Match 8	Halmstads BK	1 – 0	IF Brommapojkarna	Örjans Vall, Halmstad
	Mikael Rosén 2'	(Report) (in Swedish)		Attendance: 4,386; Referee: Martin Ingvarsson

11 June 2007 Match 9	Halmstads BK	2 – 2	Hammarby IF	Örjans Vall, Halmstad
	Mikael Rosén 52'; Per Johansson 70'	(Report) (in Swedish)	Louay Chanko 55'; Paulinho Guara 94'	Attendance: 8,208; Referee: Daniel Stålhammar

14 June 2007 Match 10	Malmö FF	1 – 2	Halmstads BK	Malmö Stadion, Malmö
	Jonathan Johansson 77'	(Report) (in Swedish)	Emra Tahirović 44'; Mikael Rosén 70'	Attendance: 14,238; Referee: Stefan Johannesson

24 June 2007 Match 11	Gefle IF	2 – 0	Halmstads BK	Strömvallen, Gävle
	Daniel Westin 30' 74'; Daniel Bernhardsson 57'	(Report) (in Swedish)		Attendance: 4,583; Referee: Tobias Mattsson

3 July 2007 Match 12	Halmstads BK	3 – 0	IF Elfsborg	Örjans Vall, Halmstad
	Dusan Djuric 20'; Mikael Rosén 52'; Hasse Mattisson 69'	(Report) (in Swedish)		Attendance: 11,029; Referee: Jonas Eriksson

8 July 2007 Match 13	Örebro SK	0 – 3	Halmstads BK	Behrn Arena, Örebro
		(Report) (in Swedish)	Jesper Westerberg 40'; Tommy Jönsson 54' (pen.); Dusan Djuric 57'	Attendance: 6,101; Referee: Håkan Jonasson

16 July 2007 Match 14	Halmstads BK	3 – 1	Örebro SK	Örjans Vall, Halmstad
	Dusan Djuric 7' 68'; Martin Fribrock 89'	(Report) (in Swedish)	Sebastian Henriksson 41'	Attendance: 9,219; Referee: Stefan Johannesson

30 July 2007 Match 15	Halmstads BK	2 – 2	GAIS	Örjans Vall, Halmstad
	Magnus Arvidsson 61'; Dime Jankulovski 75' o.g.	(Report) (in Swedish)	Tobias Holmqvist 43'; Ipke Ekong 52'	Attendance: 8,292; Referee: Daniel Stålhammar

5 August 2007 Match 16	Trelleborgs FF	1 – 1	Halmstads BK	Vångavallen, Trelleborg
	Rasmus Bengtsson 16'	(Report) (in Swedish)	Dusan Djuric 84'	Attendance: 2,495; Referee: Peter Fröjdfeldt

13 August 2007 Match 17	Halmstads BK	1 – 3	Malmö FF	Örjans Vall, Halmstad
	Magnus Arvidsson 11'	(Report) (in Swedish)	Jonathan Johansson 20'; Júnior 67'; Niclas Skoog 91' 88'	Attendance: 10,127; Referee: Jonas Eriksson

11 August 2007 Match 18	Hammarby	0 – 1	Halmstads BK	Söderstadion, Stockholm
		(Report) (in Swedish)	Tomas Zvirgzdauskas 55'	Attendance: 10,181; Referee: Martin Ingvarsson

28 August 2007 Match 19	Halmstads BK	1 – 3	IFK Göteborg	Örjans Vall, Halmstad
	Magnus Arvidsson 85'	(Report) (in Swedish)	Pontus Wernbloom 5'; Jonas Wallerstedt 57'; Hjálmar Jónsson 66'	Attendance: 9,104; Referee: Martin Hansson

2 September 2007 Match 20	Kalmar FF	3 – 0	Halmstads BK	Fredriksskans, Kalmar
	Patrik Ingelsten 48'; Joakim Lantz 51'; Viktor Elm 72'	(Report) (in Swedish)		Attendance: 4,631; Referee: Åke Andreassson

16 September 2007 Match 21	Halmstads BK	2 – 2	AIK	Örjans Vall, Halmstad
	Tommy Jönsson 21' (pen.); Ajsel Kujovic 69'	(Report) (in Swedish)	Jimmy Tamandi 6'; Ivan Obolo 78'	Attendance: 6,046; Referee: Peter Fröjdfeldt

22 September 2007 Match 22	IF Brommapojkarna	1 – 1	Halmstads BK	Grimsta IP, Bromma
	Philip Haglund 31'	(Report) (in Swedish)	Ajsel Kujovic 53'	Attendance: 2,184; Referee: Åke Andreasson

30 September 2007 Match 23	Halmstads BK	0 – 0	Gefle IF	Örjans Vall, Halmstad
		(Report) (in Swedish)		Attendance: 4,778; Referee: Mikael Lerjéus

8 October 2007 Match 24	IF Elfsborg	1 – 1	Halmstads BK	Borås Arena, Borås
	Anders Svensson 67'	(Report) (in Swedish)	Dusan Djuric 10'	Attendance: 12,565; Referee: Stefan Johannesson

22 October 2007 Match 25	Halmstads BK	1 – 2	Djurgårdens IF	Örjans Vall, Halmstad
	Tommy Jönsson 19'	(Report) (in Swedish)	Quirino 34' 36'	Attendance: 7,147; Referee: Martin Hansson

28 October 2007 Match 26	Helsingborgs IF	9 – 0	Halmstads BK	Olympia, Helsingborg
	Christoffer Andersson 16' 44'; Andreas Jakobsson 27'; Rene Makondele 36' 85'; Razak Omotoyossi 50'; Henrik Larsson 55'; Erik Wahlstedt 65'; Andreas Landgren 77'	(Report) (in Swedish)		Attendance: 11,896; Referee: Antti Kanerva

== Svenska Cupen ==
26 April 2007 Second round	Gamla Upsala SK	0 – 3	Halmstads BK	Österängens IP, Uppsala
		(Report) (in Swedish)	Ajsel Kujovic 37' 74'; Joel Johansson 73'	Attendance: 2,011; Referee: Jonas Eriksson

17 May 2007 Third round	Halmstads BK	1 – 3	IF Brommapojkarna	Örjans Vall, Halmstad
	Magnus Arvidsson 45+'	(Report) (in Swedish)	Arash Talebinejad 34' 60'; Imad Zatara 94'	Attendance: 747; Referee: Tobias Mattsson
