= 2008 Halmstads BK season =

Halmstads BK
2008 season
- Chairman: (Sweden) Arne Ekstrand (until 26 July) (Sweden) Birgitta Johansson
- Manager: (Sweden) Janne Andersson
- Allsvenskan: 8th
- Svenska Cupen: 4th round
- Top goalscorer: League: Anselmo (15); All: Anselmo (18)
- Highest home attendance: 9,693 vs Kalmar FF (9 November)
- Lowest home attendance: 2,148 vs GIF Sundsvall (24 October)

== Squad ==
=== First-team squad ===
As of 1 September 2008. Note: Flags indicate national team as defined under FIFA eligibility rules; some limited exceptions apply. Players may hold more than one non-FIFA nationality.

No.	Pos.	Nation	Player
1	GK	SWE	Conny Johansson
2	DF	SWE	Per Johansson
3	DF	SWE	Jesper Westerberg
4	DF	SWE	Tommy Jönsson (Captain)
5	DF	SWE	Markus Gustafson
6	DF	SWE	Mikael Rosén
7	MF	GER	Michael Görlitz
8	FW	SWE	Ajsel Kujovic
9	FW	SWE	Emir Kujovic
10	FW	SWE	Magnus Arvidsson
11	MF	NED	Alexander Prent
12	DF	LTU	Tomas Žvirgždauskas

No.	Pos.	Nation	Player
13	MF	SWE	Andreas Johansson
14	FW	BRA	Anselmo
15	MF	SWE	Joe Sise
16	MF	FIN	Tim Sparv
17	MF	SWE	Hjalmar Öhagen
18	MF	SWE	Marcus Olsson
19	DF	SWE	Daniel Johansson
20	GK	FIN	Magnus Bahne
21	MF	KOS	Anel Raskaj
22	GK	SWE	Karl-Johan Johnsson
23	DF	SWE	Emil Jensen
24	MF	SWE	Sebastian Johansson

=== Youth squad ===
Note: Flags indicate national team as defined under FIFA eligibility rules; some limited exceptions apply. Players may hold more than one non-FIFA nationality.

No.	Pos.	Nation	Player
—	GK	SWE	Karl-Johan Johnsson
—	GK	SWE	Viktor Kristiansson
—	GK	SWE	Stefan Markovic
—	DF	SWE	Per Gulda
—	DF	SWE	Niclas Johnsson
—	DF	SWE	Emil Larsson
—	DF	SWE	Johnny Müller
—	DF	SWE	Johan Otterström
—	DF	SWE	Johan Palm
—	DF	SWE	Sebastian Starkenberg
—	DF	SWE	Joacim Wallentin
—	MF	SWE	Thomas Allerbrand

No.	Pos.	Nation	Player
—	MF	SWE	Jonatan Alvérus
—	MF	SWE	Pehr Andersson
—	MF	KOS	Kujtim Bala
—	MF	SWE	Marcus Johansson
—	MF	SWE	Jonas Lindh
—	MF	SWE	Alexander Sakac
—	MF	SWE	Berat Sulejmani
—	FW	SWE	Eddie Andersson
—	FW	SWE	Nehat Bregaj
—	FW	SWE	Bujar Mazreku
—	FW	SWE	Ronny Sabo

== Transfers ==
=== In ===
Note: Flags indicate national team as defined under FIFA eligibility rules; some limited exceptions apply. Players may hold more than one non-FIFA nationality.

No.	Pos.	Nation	Player
11	MF	NED	Alexander Prent (from NEC Nijmegen)
9	FW	SWE	Emir Kujovic (return from loan at Falkenbergs FF)
18	MF	SWE	Marcus Olsson (from Högaborgs BK)
14	MF	BRA	Anselmo (from Boavista)
7	MF	GER	Michael Görlitz (from FC Bayern Munich)
15	MF	SWE	Joe Sise (from Snöstorp Nyhem FF)
22	GK	SWE	Karl-Johan Johnsson (from Halmstads BK youth squad)
—	MF	SWE	Emil Salomonsson (from Ängelholms FF)

=== Out ===
Note: Flags indicate national team as defined under FIFA eligibility rules; some limited exceptions apply. Players may hold more than one non-FIFA nationality.

No.	Pos.	Nation	Player
—	MF	SWE	Dusan Djuric (to FC Zürich)
—	MF	SWE	Björn Anklev (to Örgryte IS)
—	GK	KAZ	David Loria (to FC Shakhter)
—	DF	SWE	Peter Larsson (to FC Copenhagen)
—	MF	SWE	Johan Svahn (to Falkenbergs FF)
—	MF	SWE	Martin Fribrock (to Esbjerg fB)
—	MF	SWE	Hasse Mattisson (to Dalby GIF)

=== Out on loan ===
Note: Flags indicate national team as defined under FIFA eligibility rules; some limited exceptions apply. Players may hold more than one non-FIFA nationality.

No.	Pos.	Nation	Player
—	MF	SWE	Emil Salomonsson (to Ängelholms FF)
—	MF	SWE	Hjalmar Öhagen (to Ängelholms FF)
—	GK	SWE	Marcus Sahlman (to Trelleborgs FF)

== Appearances and goals ==
Last updated on 1 November 2008.

No.	Pos	Nat	Player	Total		Allsvenskan		Svenska Cupen	
No.	Pos	Nat	Player	Apps	Goals	Apps	Goals	Apps	Goals
1	GK	(Sweden) SWE	Conny Johansson	2	0	0	0	2	0
2	DF	(Sweden) SWE	Per Johansson	23	2	22	1	1	1
3	DF	(Sweden) SWE	Jesper Westerberg	23	1	21	1	2	0
4	DF	(Sweden) SWE	Tommy Jönsson	31	1	29	1	2	0
5	DF	(Sweden) SWE	Markus Gustafson	2	0	0	0	2	0
6	DF	(Sweden) SWE	Mikael Rosén	25	1	23	1	2	0
7	MF	(Sweden) SWE	Martin Fribrock^{1}	13	4	11	2	2	2
7	MF	(Germany) GER	Michael Görlitz	12	3	12	3	0	0
8	FW	(Sweden) SWE	Ajsel Kujovic	23	6	21	3	2	3
9	FW	(Sweden) SWE	Emir Kujovic	26	4	25	4	1	0
10	FW	(Sweden) SWE	Magnus Arvidsson	18	2	16	1	2	1
11	MF	(Netherlands) NED	Alexander Prent	13	1	12	1	1	0
12	DF	(Lithuania) LTU	Tomas Zvirgzdauskas	22	1	22	1	0	0
13	MF	(Sweden) SWE	Andreas Johansson	33	1	30	1	3	0
14	FW	(Brazil) BRA	Anselmo	29	18	27	15	2	3
15	DF	(Sweden) SWE	Peter Larsson^{1}	18	3	15	3	3	0
15	MF	(Sweden) SWE	Joe Sise	3	0	3	0	0	0
16	MF	(Finland) FIN	Tim Sparv	13	0	13	0	0	0
17	MF	(Sweden) SWE	Hjalmar Öhagen	3	0	2	0	1	0
18	MF	(Sweden) SWE	Marcus Olsson	23	3	20	2	3	1
19	MF	(Sweden) SWE	Daniel Johansson	2	0	2	0	0	0
20	GK	(Finland) FIN	Magnus Bahne	20	0	19	0	1	0
21	MF	(Kosovo) KOS	Anel Raskaj	30	0	27	0	3	0
22	GK	(Sweden) SWE	Marcus Sahlman^{1}	11	0	11	0	0	0
22	GK	(Sweden) SWE	Karl-Johan Johnsson	1	0	1	0	0	0
23	DF	(Sweden) SWE	Emil Jensen	1	0	0	0	1	0
24	MF	(Sweden) SWE	Sebastian Johansson	29	1	26	1	3	0
25	MF	(Sweden) SWE	Johan Svahn	1	0	0	0	1	0

^{1}= Player's number was given to another player after the player left the club.

== Pre-season ==
26 January 2008 Match 1	(Sweden) Halmstads BK	1 – 1	LB07 (Sweden)	Sannarps IP, Halmstad
	Ajsel Kujovic 25'	(Report) (in Swedish)	N/A 69'	Attendance: N/A; Referee: Mattias Nyman

2 February 2008 Match 2	(Sweden) Halmstads BK	0 – 2	Trelleborgs FF (Sweden)	Sannarps IP, Halmstad
		(Report) (in Swedish)	Jonas Bjurström 27'; Kristian Haynes 28'	Attendance: 250; Referee: Martin Ingvarsson

12 February 2008 Match 3	(Sweden) Halmstads BK	1 – 1 (4 – 5 p)	Viking Stavanger (Norway)	La Manga
	Ajsel Kujovic 11'	(Report) (in Swedish)	André Danielsen 66'	Attendance: N/A; Referee: N/A
	Penalties
	Sparv (penalty scored); A. Johansson (penalty scored); Prent (penalty missed); Fribrock (penalty scored); Westerberg (penalty scored)		(penalty scored) Stokholm; (penalty scored) Gaarde; (penalty scored) Soma; (penalty scored) Austnes; (penalty scored) Ødegaard

15 February 2008 Match 4	(Sweden) Halmstads BK	0 – 1	Krylia Sovetov (Russia)	La Manga
		(Report) (in Swedish)	Yevgeny Savin 66'	Attendance: N/A; Referee: Terje Haugen

18 February 2008 Match 5	(Sweden) Halmstads BK	2 – 2 (2 – 3 p)	Lillestrøm SK (Norway)	La Manga
	Magnus Arvidsson 27'; Ajsel Kujovic 81'	(Report) (in Swedish)	Frode Kippe 31'; Olivier Occean 50'	Attendance: 130; Referee: Kjetil Sælen
	Penalties
	Prent (penalty scored); Westerberg (penalty scored); Jönsson (penalty missed); A. Kujovic (penalty missed)		(penalty scored) Mouelhi; (penalty missed) Brenne; (penalty scored) Occean; (penalty scored) Pedersen

15 February 2008 Match 6	(Sweden) Halmstads BK	2 – 1	Mjällby AIF (Sweden)	Sannarps IP, Halmstad
	Andreas Johansson 6'; Martin Fribrock 80'	(Report) (in Swedish)	Robin Cederberg 40'	Attendance: N/A; Referee: Mattias Nyman

15 February 2008 Match 7	(Sweden) Halmstads BK	1 – 0	FC Midtjylland (Denmark)	Sannarps IP, Halmstad
	Magnus Arvidsson 30'	(Report) (in Swedish)		Attendance: N/A; Referee: Miro Ukalovic

15 February 2008 Match 8	(Sweden) Halmstads BK	3 – 0	AIK (Sweden)	Alevallen, Halmstad
	Magnus Arvidsson 10'; Ajsel Kujovic 35'; Tommy Jönsson 49'	(Report) (in Swedish)		Attendance: 750; Referee: Martin Hansson

15 February 2008 Match 9	(Sweden) Halmstads BK	0 – 0	Kalmar FF (Sweden)	Alevallen, Halmstad
		(Report) (in Swedish)		Attendance: 733; Referee: Peter Hallengren

15 February 2008 Match 10	(Sweden) Halmstads BK	1 – 2	IF Elfsborg (Sweden)	Örjans Vall, Halmstad
	Anselmo 67'	(Report) (in Swedish)	Denni Avdic 23'; Anders Svensson 84'	Attendance: 832; Referee: Daniel Stålhammar

18 June 2008 Match 11	(Sweden) Falu FK	0 – 2	Halmstads BK (Sweden)	Kopparvallen, Falun
		(Report) (in Swedish)	Mikael Rosén 68'; Ajsel Kujovic 89'	Attendance: 300; Referee: Lars Kratz

27 July 2008 Match 12	(Sweden) Halmstads BK	1 – 3	Reading FC (England)	Örjans vall, Halmstad
	Alexander Prent 79'	(Report) (in Swedish)	Kevin Doyle 73', 87'; Noel Hunt 74'	Attendance: 552; Referee: Mikael Eriksson

== Allsvenskan ==
Pos	Team	Pld	W	D	L	GF	GA	GD	Pts
6	Malmö FF	30	12	8	10	51	46	+5	44
7	Örebro SK	30	11	9	10	36	39	−3	42
8	Halmstads BK	30	11	8	11	41	38	+3	41
9	Hammarby IF	30	11	8	11	44	51	−7	41
10	Trelleborgs FF	30	9	13	8	33	31	+2	40

Source: svenskfotboll.se (in Swedish)
Rules for classification: 1) points; 2) goal difference; 3) number of goals scored.

30 March 2008 Match 1	Halmstads BK	1 – 0	Gefle IF	Örjans Vall, Halmstad
15:00 CET	Martin Fribrock 61'	(Report) (in Swedish)		Attendance: 5,447; Referee: Martin Ingvarsson

6 April 2008 Match 2	Helsingborgs IF	1 – 1	Halmstads BK	Olympia, Helsingborg
17:45 CET	Rene Makondele 8'	(Report) (in Swedish)	Martin Fribrock 45'	Attendance: 11,074; Referee: Markus Strömbergsson

9 April 2008 Match 3	Halmstads BK	1 – 1	IFK Göteborg	Örjans Vall, Halmstad
19:45 CET	Peter Larsson 25'	(Report) (in Swedish)	Thomas Olsson 42'	Attendance: 6,786; Referee: Stefan Johannesson

13 April 2008 Match 4	Djurgårdens IF	2 – 1	Halmstads BK	Stockholm Stadium, Stockholm
15:00 CET	Sebastian Rajalakso 6'; Sölvi Ottesen 25'	(Report) (in Swedish)	Anselmo 77'	Attendance: 8,947; Referee: Martin Hansson

16 April 2008 Match 5	IFK Norrköping	1 – 3	Halmstads BK	Idrottsparken, Norrköping
19:00 CET	Riki Cakic 84'	(Report) (in Swedish)	Peter Larsson 2'; Peter Larsson 24'; Ajsel Kujovic 82'	Attendance: 5,452; Referee: Daniel Stålhammar

21 April 2008 Match 6	Halmstads BK	2 – 3	Malmö FF	Örjans Vall, Halmstad
20:00 CET	Alexander Prent 6'; Anselmo 85'	(Report) (in Swedish)	Christian Järdler 46'; Ola Toivonen 73'; Labinot Harbuzi 90+'	Attendance: 6,909; Referee: Stefan Johannesson

24 April 2008 Match 7	Örebro SK	0 – 1	Halmstads BK	Behrn Arena, Örebro
19:00 CET		(Report) (in Swedish)	Anselmo 3'	Attendance: 9,125; Referee: Jonas Eriksson

27 April 2008 Match 8	Halmstads BK	0 – 0	GAIS	Örjans Vall, Halmstad
15:00 CET		(Report) (in Swedish)		Attendance: 5,674; Referee: Håkan Jonasson

5 May 2008 Match 9	AIK	1 – 0	Halmstads BK	Råsunda, Stockholm
20:00 CET	Kenny Pavey 88'	(Report) (in Swedish)		Attendance: 14,051; Referee: Markus Strömbergsson

8 May 2008 Match 10	Halmstads BK	3 – 2	Ljungskile SK	Örjans Vall, Halmstad
19:00 CET	Anselmo 3'; Emir Kujovic 56'; Marcus Olsson 66'	(Report) (in Swedish)	Andreas Kristoffersson 79' 87'	Attendance: 4,493; Referee: Martin Ingvarsson

12 May 2008 Match 11	GIF Sundsvall	2 – 1	Halmstads BK	Norrporten Arena, Sundsvall
19:00 CET	Tobias Eriksson 19' 74'	(Report) (in Swedish)	Anselmo 53'	Attendance: 4,519; Referee: Stefan Johannesson

2 July 2008 Match 12	Halmstads BK	1 – 1	Hammarby IF	Örjans Vall, Halmstad
19:00 CET	Anselmo 14'	(Report) (in Swedish)	Charlie Davies 80'	Attendance: 10,309; Referee: Markus Strömbergsson

5 July 2008 Match 13	Kalmar FF	1 – 1	Halmstads BK	Fredriksskans, Kalmar
16:00 CET	David Elm 90'	(Report) (in Swedish)	Magnus Arvidsson 70'	Attendance: 5,078; Referee: Håkan Jonasson

16 July 2008 Match 14	Halmstads BK	1 – 2	IF Elfsborg	Örjans Vall, Halmstad
19:00 CET	Sebastian Johansson 92'	(Report) (in Swedish)	Emir Bajrami 31'; Fredrik Berglund 49'	Attendance: 9,412; Referee: Jonas Eriksson

20 July 2008 Match 15	Trelleborgs FF	1 – 2	Halmstads BK	Vångavallen, Trelleborg
18:00 CET	Andreas Drugge 6'	(Report) (in Swedish)	Ajsel Kujovic 56'; Jesper Westerberg 80'	Attendance: 2,845; Referee: Sven-Martin Åkesson

26 July 2008 Match 16	Halmstads BK	0 – 0	Trelleborgs FF	Örjans Vall, Halmstad
17:00 CET		(Report) (in Swedish)		Attendance: 6,229; Referee: Åke Andreasson

3 August 2008 Match 17	Gefle IF	4 – 0	Halmstads BK	Strömvallen, Gävle
18:00 CET	Mathias Woxlin 51'; Johannes Ericsson 71'; Hans Berggren 77' 88'	(Report) (in Swedish)		Attendance: 2,448; Referee: Daniel Stålhammar

11 August 2008 Match 18	Halmstads BK	3 – 1	Helsingborgs IF	Örjans Vall, Halmstad
20:00 CET	Ajsel Kujovic 5'; Michael Görlitz 10'; Anselmo 65'	(Report) (in Swedish)	Henrik Larsson 67'	Attendance: 6,899; Referee: Stefan Johannesson

17 September 2008 Match 19	IFK Göteborg	3 – 0	Halmstads BK	Ullevi, Gothenburg
19:00 CET	Tobias Hysén 36'; Robin Söder 50'; Mattias Bjärsmyr 64'	(Report) (in Swedish)		Attendance: 5,149; Referee: Jonas Eriksson

24 August 2008 Match 20	Halmstads BK	1 – 2	Djurgårdens IF	Örjans Vall, Halmstad
18:00 CET	Marcus Olsson 57'	(Report) (in Swedish)	Mikael Dahlberg 24'; Andrej Komac 38'	Attendance: 5,621; Referee: Peter Fröjdfeldt

31 August 2008 Match 21	Halmstads BK	2 – 0	IFK Norrköping	Örjans Vall, Halmstad
18:00 CET	Anselmo 57'; Michael Görlitz 10'	(Report) (in Swedish)		Attendance: 4,341; Referee: Sven-Martin Åkesson

13 September 2008 Match 22	Malmö FF	0 – 3	Halmstads BK	Malmö Stadion, Malmö
16:00 CET		(Report) (in Swedish)	Per Johansson 22'; Anselmo 68' 73'	Attendance: 7,486; Referee: Peter Fröjdfeldt

22 September 2008 Match 23	Halmstads BK	1 – 2	Örebro SK	Örjans Vall, Halmstad
19:00 CET	Emir Kujovic 78'	(Report) (in Swedish)	Magnus Wikström 23'; Kim Olsen 28'	Attendance: 3,658; Referee: Åke Andreasson

28 September 2008 Match 24	GAIS	0 – 4	Halmstads BK	Ullevi, Gothenburg
17:00 CET		(Report) (in Swedish)	Tomas Zvirgzdauskas 17'; Michael Görlitz 24'; Anselmo 29' 81'	Attendance: 2,834; Referee: Tobias Mattsson

5 October 2008 Match 25	Halmstads BK	2 – 1	AIK	Örjans Vall, Halmstad
15:00 CET	Mikael Rosén 65'; Tommy Jönsson 78'	(Report) (in Swedish)	Nils-Eric Johansson 69'	Attendance: 2,874; Referee: Michael Lerjéus

19 October 2008 Match 26	Ljungskile SK	0 – 3	Halmstads BK	H. A. Bygg Arena, Ljungskile
15:00 CET		(Report) (in Swedish)	Anselmo 30' 66'; Emir Kujovic 77'	Attendance: 2,352; Referee: Tobias Mattsson

24 October 2008 Match 27	Halmstads BK	0 – 0	GIF Sundsvall	Örjans Vall, Halmstad
19:00 CET		(Report) (in Swedish)		Attendance: 2,148; Referee: Martin Ingvarsson

29 October 2008 Match 28	Hammarby IF	2 – 1	Halmstads BK	Söderstadion, Stockholm
19:00 CET	Olof Guterstam 68'; Louay Chanko 78'	(Report) (in Swedish)	Anselmo 55'	Attendance: 5,592; Referee: Martin Hansson

3 November 2008 Match 29	IF Elfsborg	3 – 0	Halmstads BK	Borås Arena, Borås
19:00 CET	Fredrik Berglund 74'; Emir Bajrami 78'; Lasse Nilsson 82'	(Report) (in Swedish)		Attendance: 7,566; Referee: Stefan Johannesson

9 November 2008 Match 30	Halmstads BK	2 – 2	Kalmar FF	Örjans Vall, Halmstad
15:00 CET	Emir Kujovic 50'; Andreas Johansson 65'	(Report) (in Swedish)	Daniel Sobralense 14'; Patrik Ingelsten 87'	Attendance: 9,693; Referee: Daniel Stålhammar

== Svenska Cupen ==
1 May 2008 Second round	IFK Luleå	1 – 2	Halmstads BK	Hertsö IP, Luleå
14:00 CET	Barzan Jamshidi 82'	(Report) (in Swedish)	Anselmo 54'; Emir Kujovic 61'	Attendance: 1,731; Referee: Keijo Hyvärinen

15 May 2008 Third round	Nyköpings BIS	0 – 9	Halmstads BK	Rosvalla, Nyköping
18:30 CET		(Report) (in Swedish)	Ajsel Kujovic 20' 32' 62'; Anselmo 42' 58' 60'; Martin Fribrock 64' 77'; Marcus Olsson 82'	Attendance: 812; Referee: Magnus Ahlsén

25 June 2008 Fourth round	Halmstads BK	2 – 2 (a.e.t.) (2 – 4 p)	IF Elfsborg	Örjans Vall, Halmstad
18:00 CET	Per Johansson 62'; Magnus Arvidsson 96'	(Report) (in Swedish)	Mathias Florén 91'; Elmin Kurbegovic 109'	Attendance: 2,257; Referee: Michael Lerjéus
	Penalties
	Jönsson (penalty scored); A. Johansson (penalty missed); E. Kujovic (penalty scored); Westerberg (penalty missed)		(penalty scored) Mobaeck; (penalty scored) Ishizaki; (penalty scored) Augustsson; (penalty scored) Avdic
