= 2006 Halmstads BK season =

Halmstads BK
2006 season
- Chairman: (Sweden) Arne Ekstrand
- Manager: (Sweden) Jan Andersson
- Allsvenskan: 11th
- Svenska Cupen: 4th Round
- Top goalscorer: League: Magnus Arvidsson (7); All: Magnus Arvidsson (7)
- Highest home attendance: 10 134 vs IFK Göteborg (16 July)
- Lowest home attendance: 4 347 vs Kalmar FF (29 October)

Halmstads BK participated in 2006 in Allsvenskan and Svenska Cupen.

== 2006 season squad ==
The 2006 season squad. Statistics prior to season start only

Squad Season 2006
| No. | Player | Nat. | Birthdate | In Halmstads BK since | Previous club | Caps for Halmstads BK | Goals for Halmstads BK |
Goalkeepers
| 1 | Conny Johansson | (Sweden) | 17 July 1971 (age 53) | 1999 | Laholms FK | 91 | 0 |
| 22 | Marcus Sahlman | (Sweden) | 2 January 1985 (age 40) | 2003 | Youth Team | 2 | 0 |
Defenders
| 2 | Per Johansson | (Sweden) | 6 May 1978 (age 47) | 2001 | GAIS | 67 | 2 |
| 3 | Jesper Westerberg | (Sweden) | 1 February 1986 (age 39) | 2006 | Landskrona BoIS | 0 | 0 |
| 4 | Tommy Jönsson | (Sweden) | 4 March 1976 (age 49) | 1998 | Malmö FF | 193 | 22 |
| 5 | Joel Borgstrand | (Sweden) | 10 November 1972 (age 52) | 1991 | Youth Team | 124 | 3 |
| 6 | Mikael Rosén | (Sweden) | 15 August 1974 (age 50) | 2006 | (Denmark) Viborg FF | 96 (Note: Matches from earlier spell with the club included) | 3 |
| 12 | Tomas Žvirgždauskas | (Lithuania) | 18 March 1975 (age 50) | 2002 | (Poland) Widzew Łódź | 79 | 3 |
| 15 | Peter Larsson | (Sweden) | 30 April 1984 (age 41) | 2003 | Youth Team | 20 | 3 |
| 21 | Tibor Joza | (Sweden) | 10 August 1986 (age 38) | 2004 | Youth Team | 0 | 0 |
| 23 | Emil Jensen | (Sweden) | 19 June 1979 (age 46) | 1998 | Youth Team | 101 | 2 |
Midfielders
| 7 | Martin Fribrock | (Sweden) | 28 August 1984 (age 40) | 2005 | Helsingborgs IF | 25 | 2 |
| 8 | Eduardo Delani | (Brazil) | 3 November 1981 (age 43) | 2005 | (Brazil) Botafogo | 6 | 1 |
| 9 | Magnus Svensson | (Sweden) | 10 March 1969 (age 56) | 2002 | (Denmark) Brøndby IF | 180 | 7 |
| 13 | Andreas Johansson | (Sweden) | 10 March 1982 (age 43) | 2002 | Youth Team | 73 | 5 |
| 14 | Dusan Djurić | (Sweden) | 13 September 1984 (age 40) | 2003 | Youth Team | 70 | 6 |
| 18 | Björn Anklev | (Sweden) | 13 April 1979 (age 46) | 2004 | Nyköpings BIS | 40 | 3 |
| 19 | Kristoffer Fagercrantz | (Sweden) | 9 October 1986 (age 38) | 2005 | Youth Team | 5 | 0 |
| 25 | Hasse Mattisson | (Sweden) | 29 August 1972 (age 52) | 2006 | Malmö FF | 0 | 0 |
Forwards
| 10 | Magnus Arvidsson | (Sweden) | 15 February 1986 (age 39) | 2006 | (Germany) Hansa Rostock | 0 | 0 |
| 16 | Magnus Andersson | (Sweden) | 27 April 1981 (age 44) | 2002 | IFK Värnamo | 78 | 11 |
| 17 | Patrik Ingelsten | (Sweden) | 25 January 1982 (age 43) | 2002 | IFK Värnamo | 3 | 0 |
| 20 | Emra Tahirović | (Sweden) | 31 July 1987 (age 37) | 2006 | Örebro SK | 0 | 0 |
| 24 | Ajsel Kujović | (Sweden) | 1 March 1985 (age 40) | 2006 | (Netherlands) Feyenoord | 0 | 0 |
Players departed during the season
| 10 | Gunnar Heiðar Þorvaldsson | (Iceland) | 1 April 1982 (age 43) | 2004 | (Iceland) ÍBV | 29 | 16 |
Last updated: 17 April 2012

== Transfers ==
=== In ===
Note: Flags indicate national team as defined under FIFA eligibility rules; some limited exceptions apply. Players may hold more than one non-FIFA nationality.

| No. | Pos. | Nation | Player |
|---|---|---|---|
| 10 | FW | (Sweden) SWE | Magnus Arvidsson (from Hansa Rostock) |
| 16 | MF | (Sweden) SWE | Kristoffer Fagercrantz (from Halmstads BK youth squad) |
| 20 | DF | (Sweden) SWE | Tibor Joza (from Halmstads BK youth squad) |
| — | FW | (Sweden) SWE | Emra Tahirović (from Örebro SK) |
| 22 | DF | (Sweden) SWE | Jesper Westerberg (from Landskrona BoIS) |
| 24 | FW | (Sweden) SWE | Ajsel Kujović (from Feyenoord) |
| — | DF | (Sweden) SWE | Mikael Rosén (from Viborg FF) |
| — | MF | (Sweden) SWE | Hasse Mattisson (from Malmö FF) |

=== Out ===
Note: Flags indicate national team as defined under FIFA eligibility rules; some limited exceptions apply. Players may hold more than one non-FIFA nationality.

| No. | Pos. | Nation | Player |
|---|---|---|---|
| — | MF | (Sweden) SWE | Torbjörn Arvidsson (retires) |
| — | MF | (Sweden) SWE | Johan Mangfors (to Ängelholms FF) |
| — | FW | (Ghana) GHA | Yaw Preko (to Ettifaq FC) |
| — | MF | (Belarus) BLR | Dzyanis Sashcheka (loan return to Torpedo Zhodino) |
| — | DF | (Sweden) SWE | Tobias Tandrup (to Ängelholms FF) |
| — | FW | (Iceland) ISL | Gunnar Heiðar Þorvaldsson (to Hannover 96) |
| — | MF | (Sweden) SWE | Kristoffer Fagercrantz (on loan to Laholms FK) |

== Fixtures and results ==
=== Allsvenskan ===
==== League table ====
| Pos | Team | Pld | W | D | L | GF | GA | GD | Pts | Qualification or relegation |
|---|---|---|---|---|---|---|---|---|---|---|
| 9 | Gefle IF | 26 | 8 | 7 | 11 | 28 | 39 | −11 | 31 | |
| 10 | GAIS | 26 | 5 | 12 | 9 | 25 | 33 | −8 | 27 | |
| 11 | Halmstads BK | 26 | 5 | 12 | 9 | 22 | 30 | −8 | 27 | |
| 12 | BK Häcken (R) | 26 | 4 | 10 | 12 | 29 | 41 | −12 | 22 | Qualification to Relegation play-offs Qualification to UEFA Cup first qualifying round (Note: Sweden was among the best three associations in the UEFA Fair Play ranking and thus received an additional spot in the first qualifying round of the Europa League, Häcken received the qualifying spot for their ranking in Allsvenskans Fair Play ranking.) |
| 13 | Östers IF (R) | 26 | 4 | 7 | 15 | 19 | 46 | −27 | 19 | Relegation to Superettan |

Source: svenskfotboll.se (in Swedish)
Rules for classification: 1) points; 2) goal difference; 3) number of goals scored.
(R) Relegated

==== League fixtures and results ====
| 20 April 2006 Match 1 | Halmstads BK | 0–1 | IF Elfsborg | Halmstad |
| 19:00 CET | A. Johansson (yellow card) 23'; Ingelsten (yellow card) 40'; Žvirgždauskas (yellow card) 60' | (report) (in Swedish) | 36' Augustsson; (yellow card) 38' Samuelsson | Stadium: Örjans Vall; Attendance: 5 505; Referee: Åke Andreasson |

| 9 April 2006 Match 2 | BK Häcken | 0–0 | Halmstads BK | Gothenburg |
| 15:00 CET | Kaïssi (yellow card) 58' | (report) (in Swedish) | | Stadium: Rambergsvallen; Attendance: 5 505; Referee: Håkan Jonasson |

| 17 April 2006 Match 3 | Halmstads BK | 0–0 | Djurgårdens IF | Halmstad |
| 15:00 CET | A. Johansson (yellow card) 67'; Þorvaldsson (yellow card) 88' | (report) (in Swedish) | (yellow card) 43' Árnason; (yellow card) 82' Concha; (yellow card) 90' Davids | Stadium: Örjans Vall; Attendance: 6 172; Referee: Martin Ingvarsson |

| 23 April 2006 Match 4 | Hammarby IF | 0–0 | Halmstads BK | Stockholm |
| 15:00 CET | M. Jensen (yellow card) 32' (yellow-red card) 79'; Andersson (yellow card) 57'; Runström (yellow card) 81' | (report) (in Swedish) | (yellow card) 45' E. Jensen | Stadium: Söderstadion; Attendance: 12 333; Referee: Daniel Stålhammar |

| 26 April 2006 Match 5 | Halmstads BK | 0–0 | GAIS | Halmstad |
| 19:00 CET | Žvirgždauskas (yellow card) 8' | (report) (in Swedish) | (yellow card) 68' Friberg da Cruz; (yellow card) 79' Keene | Stadium: Örjans Vall; Attendance: 4 886; Referee: Markus Strömbergsson |

| 3 May 2006 Match 6 | Malmö FF | 1–0 | Halmstads BK | Malmö |
| 19:00 CET | Osmanovski (yellow card) 27'; Ofere (yellow card) 78'; Litmanen 90' | (report) (in Swedish) | (yellow card) 40' Fribrock; (yellow card) 74' Larsson; (yellow card) 90' P. Johansson | Stadium: Malmö Stadion; Attendance: 14 193; Referee: Åke Andreasson |

| 7 May 2006 Match 7 | Halmstads BK | 1–0 | Örgryte IS | Halmstad |
| 17:00 CET | A. Johansson (yellow card) 12'; P. Johansson 53' | (report) (in Swedish) | (yellow card) 65' Dahlin | Stadium: Örjans Vall; Attendance: 6 278; Referee: Håkan Jonasson |

| 11 May 2006 Match 8 | Helsingborgs IF | 1–1 | Halmstads BK | Helsingborg |
| 17:00 CET | Shelton (yellow card) 3'; Mariga (yellow card) 9'; Dahl 29' | (report) (in Swedish) | 8' (yellow card) 56' Djurić; (yellow card) 80' Ingelsten | Stadium: Olympia; Attendance: 6 278; Referee: Håkan Jonasson |

| 15 May 2006 Match 9 | Helsingborgs IF | 2–1 | Halmstads BK | Kalmar |
| 17:00 CET | Ferreira 32', 89' (yellow card) 55' | (report) (in Swedish) | (yellow card) 12' C. Johansson; 32' (yellow card) 68' P. Johansson; (yellow card) 85' Þorvaldsson | Stadium: Fredriksskans; Attendance: 4 677; Referee: Jonas Eriksson |

| 16 July 2006 Match 10 | Halmstads BK | 1–4 | IFK Göteborg | Halmstad |
| 18:00 CET | Arvidsson 11'; Djurić (yellow card) 46' (yellow-red card) 66' | (report) (in Swedish) | 5', 82' Mourad; 40' Jónsson; 56' Wernbloom | Stadium: Örjans Vall; Attendance: 10 134; Referee: Daniel Stålhammar |

| 23 July 2006 Match 11 | AIK | 3–0 | Halmstads BK | Stockholm, Solna |
| 17:00 CET | Pavey 47'; Özkan 84'; Rubarth 87' | (report) (in Swedish) | (yellow card) 18' P. Johansson; (yellow card) 37' Fribrock; (yellow card) 59' Rosén | Stadium: Råsunda; Attendance: 10 134; Referee: Daniel Stålhammar |

| 31 July 2006 Match 12 | Halmstads BK | 3–0 | Gefle IF | Halmstad |
| 19:00 CET | Fribrock 9' (yellow card) 64'; Tahirović 13' (yellow card) 27'; Djurić 47' | (report) (in Swedish) | (yellow card) 37' Bernhardsson | Stadium: Örjans Vall; Attendance: 4 818; Referee: Sven-Martin Åkesson |

| 7 August 2006 Match 13 | Östers IF | 3–1 | Halmstads BK | Växjö |
| 19:00 CET | Bennett 21', 45'; Figueiredo 29'; Zavadil (yellow card) 44'; Backman (yellow card) 70' | (report) (in Swedish) | (yellow card) 38' Jensen; (yellow card) 45' Tahirović; 53' Jönsson | Stadium: Värendsvallen; Attendance: 4 528; Referee: Martin Ingvarsson |

| 13 August 2006 Match 14 | Halmstads BK | 1–0 | Östers IF | Halmstad |
| 19:00 CET | Tahirović 1' | (report) (in Swedish) | (yellow card) 38' Figueiredo | Stadium: Örjans Vall; Attendance: 4 689; Referee: Miro Ukalovic |

| 22 August 2006 Match 15 | IF Elfsborg | 3–0 | Halmstads BK | Borås |
| 19:00 CET | Jönsson 14'; Alexandersson 26'; M. Svensson 38' | (report) (in Swedish) | (yellow card) 23' Tahirović; (yellow card) 64' Ingelsten | Stadium: Borås Arena; Attendance: 12 782; Referee: Peter Fröjdfeldt |

| 27 August 2006 Match 16 | Halmstads BK | 2–2 | BK Häcken | Halmstad |
| 19:00 CET | Arvidsson 4'; Kujović 18'; Westerberg (yellow card) 82' | (report) (in Swedish) | 39' Olofsson; 82' Mambo Mumba | Stadium: Örjans Vall; Attendance: 4 588; Referee: Håkan Jonasson |

| 11 September 2006 Match 17 | Örgryte IS | 1–2 | Halmstads BK | Gothenburg |
| 19:00 CET | Toivonen 16'; Uusimäki (yellow card) 26'; Last (yellow card) 55'; Mwila (yellow card) 72' | (report) (in Swedish) | (yellow card) 18' A. Johansson; (yellow card) 28' Larsson; 56' Arvidsson; 81' Kujović | Stadium: Gamla Ullevi; Attendance: 3 827; Referee: Martin Ingvarsson |

| 17 September 2006 Match 18 | Halmstads BK | 1–1 | Helsingborgs IF | Halmstad |
| 19:00 CET | Fribrock (yellow card) 11'; Arvidsson 64' | (report) (in Swedish) | (yellow card) 13' Miranda; 20' H. Larsson; (yellow card) 84' Jakobsson | Stadium: Örjans Vall; Attendance: 8 247; Referee: Miro Ukalovic |

| 20 September 2006 Match 19 | GAIS | 1–1 | Halmstads BK | Gothenburg |
| 19:00 CET | Friberg da Cruz 66'; Ekong (yellow card) 87' | (report) (in Swedish) | 37' Arvidsson; (yellow card) 45' Djurić | Stadium: Gamla Ullevi; Attendance: 3 331; Referee: Martin Ingvarsson |

| 24 September 2006 Match 20 | Halmstads BK | 2–2 | Malmö FF | Halmstad |
| 19:00 CET | Djurić 23'; Westerberg (yellow card) 70'; Ingelsten 77'; Arvidsson (yellow card) 80' | (report) (in Swedish) | 14' Pode; 87' Hallfreðsson | Stadium: Örjans Vall; Attendance: 6 428; Referee: Martin Hansson |

| 1 October 2006 Match 21 | Djurgårdens IF | 2–1 | Halmstads BK | Stockholm |
| 19:00 CET | Árnason (yellow card) 37'; Kusi-Asare 60'; Davids 78' | (report) (in Swedish) | (yellow card) 61' A. Johansson; (yellow card) 62' Svensson; (yellow card) 82' Fribrock; 84' Tahirović | Stadium: Stockholm Stadium; Attendance: 7 509; Referee: Miro Ukalovic |

| 16 October 2006 Match 22 | Halmstads BK | 0–0 | Hammarby IF | Halmstad |
| 19:00 CET | | [ (report)] (in Swedish) | | Stadium: Örjans Vall; Attendance: 6 259; Referee: Daniel Stålhammar |

| 21 October 2006 Match 23 | Halmstads BK | 2–2 | AIK | Halmstad |
| 16:00 CET | Mattisson 18'; Fribrock 41' | (report) (in Swedish) | 72' Burgič; (yellow card) 79' Özkan; 86' Carlsson | Stadium: Örjans Vall; Attendance: 5 685; Referee: Peter Fröjdfeldt |

| 26 October 2006 Match 24 | Gefle IF | 0–2 | Halmstads BK | Gefle |
| 19:00 CET | Bapupa (yellow card) 66' (yellow-red card) 77' | (report) (in Swedish) | 52', 54' Arvidsson | Stadium: Strömvallen; Attendance: 2 440; Referee: Daniel Stålhammar |

| 29 October 2006 Match 25 | Halmstads BK | 0–1 | Kalmar FF | Halmstad |
| 19:00 CET | Fribrock (yellow card) 63'; Kujović (yellow card) 73' | (report) (in Swedish) | 57' Carlsson; (yellow card) 57' Santin; (yellow card) 79' V. Elm | Stadium: Örjans Vall; Attendance: 4 347; Referee: Håkan Jonasson |

| 5 November 2006 Match 26 | IFK Göteborg | 0–0 | Halmstads BK | Gothenburg |
| 19:00 CET | Wowoah (yellow card) 28'; Wernbloom (yellow card) 38' | (report) (in Swedish) | (yellow card) 7' Joza; (yellow card) 87' Mattisson | Stadium: Gamla Ullevi; Attendance: 4 580; Referee: Åke Andreasson |
