= Andreas Johansson =

Andreas Johansson may refer to:

- Andreas Johansson (footballer, born 1978), Swedish former footballer that most recently was playing for Djurgårdens IF
- Andreas Johansson (footballer, born 1982), Swedish footballer playing for Halmstads BK
- Andreas Johansson (ice hockey) (born 1973), Swedish hockey player
- Andreas Johansson, drummer in Narnia
- Andreas Johansson, bass guitarist in Cult of Luna
