= Anselmo (footballer, born 1980) =

Brazilian footballer

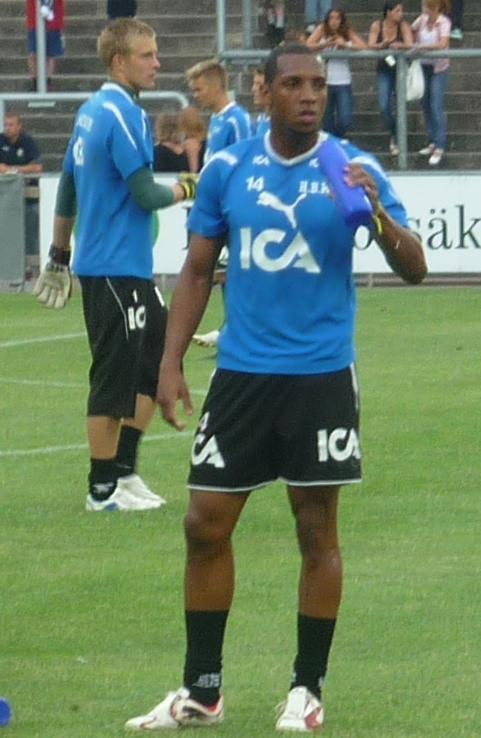
- Anselmo (front) in 2010

Personal information
- Full name: Anselmo Tadeu Silva do Nascimento
- Date of birth: October 24, 1980 (age 46)
- Place of birth: Rio de Janeiro, Brazil
- Height: 1.82 m (6 ft 0 in)
- Position: Forward

Senior career*
Years	Team	Apps	(Gls)
1998–2003	Palmeiras		
2003	Gama		
2003	Al-Sailiya		
2004	Ponte Preta		
2005	Náutico		
2005	Paysandu		
2006	Atlético Mineiro		
2006	Criciúma		
2007	Boavista		
2007	Vasco da Gama		
2007	Avaí		
2008	Boavista		
2008–2010	Halmstad		
2011	Botafogo-SP		
2011	Atlético Goianiense		
2012	Shanghai Shenxin		
2013	Ceará		
2013	Atlético Goianiense		
2014	Linense		
2014	Tombense		
2015	Boavista		
2015	Macaé		
2016	Fortaleza		
2017	Náutico		
2017	Paysandu		
2018	Volta Redonda		
2019	Santo André		
2019	Água Santa		
2020	Sergipe		
2020	Portuguesa		
2020	Freipaulistano		
2020–2021	Anápolis		
2021	Campinense		
2022	São Paulo Crystal		
2022	Cerrado		
2023	Belo Jardim		
- * Club domestic league appearances and goals

Anselmo Tadeu Silva do Nascimento (born October 24, 1980), commonly known as Anselmo Tadeu, or Anselmo, is a Brazilian footballer, who plays forward for Club Sportivo Sergipe.

He started his career in Palmeiras in 1998 and has since represented a large group of Brazilian clubs between 2003 and 2008. He made a short spell outside Brazil in 2003 when he played for Qatari club Al-Sailiya Sport Club. In 2008, Halmstads BK, looking for a replacement for Dusan Djuric, who had left for FC Zurich, chose to sign Anselmo; costing 3 million SEK, he became the most expensive player the club ever had bought so far. As Anselmos contract ended and the Halmstad unable to provide the amounts Anselmo wished for to sign a new contract, he departed the club and signed for Brazilian club Botafogo (SP).

== Honours ==
Ceará

- Campeonato Cearense: 2013

Tombense

- Campeonato Brasileiro Série D: 2014

Ceará

- Campeonato Cearense: 2016

Santo André

- Campeonato Paulista Série A2: 2019
