= Conny Johansson =

Swedish footballer (born 1971)

Personal information
- Full name: Conny Johansson
- Date of birth: July 17, 1971 (age 55)
- Place of birth: Sweden
- Height: 1.86 m (6 ft 1 in)
- Position: Goalkeeper

Senior career*
Years	Team	Apps	(Gls)
–1991	IF Leikin		
1992–1998	Laholms FK		
1999–2008	Halmstads BK	105	
- * Club domestic league appearances and goals as of 15:13, 2 October 2010 (UTC)

Conny Johansson (born July 17, 1971) is a Swedish former football player, who played as goalkeeper and currently works as goalkeeper coach for Halmstads BK.

== Career ==
He started his career in IF Leikin and moved in 1992 to Laholms FK, which was coached by Janne Andersson, later assistant manager and manager for Halmstads BK. He stayed in Laholm until 1998 when he signed a contract with Halmstads BK.

First he was second goalkeeper behind Håkan Svensson, but when Svensson left in 2002 Conny was made first choice. At the arrival of the Finnish keeper Magnus Bahne in 2007, he saw himself yet again become second choice. When Bahne was injured during the 2007 season Conny was made first goalkeeper, being the only one available since Sahlman was on loan at Trelleborgs FF, until David Loria was brought in.

In the first match of 2008 Conny was yet again made second choice after young talent Marcus Sahlman even after starting most pre-season matches.

On 19 September 2008 Conny announced on Halmstads BK's homepage that he would leave the club at the end of the season, making him the oldest goalkeeper in the club so far, beating earlier Rune Ludvigsson by about six months. He has since become goalkeeping coach for Halmstads BK.

His first game in Allsvenskan was against GIF Sundsvall, a 2–1 victory.

== Achievements ==
Halmstads BK:

- Allsvenskan:
  - Champion: 2000 ^{*}
  - Stora Silvret (2nd): 2004
  - Lilla Silvret (3rd): 1999^{*}

^{* = Too few matches played to get a medal}
