= Tuomas Uusimäki =

Finnish footballer (born 1977)

Personal information
- Date of birth: 9 July 1977 (age 49)
- Place of birth: Kokkola, Finland
- Height: 1.87 m (6 ft 2 in)
- Position: Defensive midfielder

Youth career
- GBK
- KPV

Senior career*
Years	Team	Apps	(Gls)
1996	KPV	19	(6)
1997	GBK	17	(1)
1998	Jaro	20	(0)
1999	Närpes Kraft	23	(1)
2000–2001	VPS	43	(1)
2001–2004	BK Häcken	94	(3)
2005–2006	Örgryte	45	(2)
2007	Grazer AK	11	(0)
2007–2009	KPV	60	(6)

International career
1998–1999	Finland U21	4	(0)
2005–2006	Finland	5	(0)
- * Club domestic league appearances and goals as of 14 May 2024

Tuomas Uusimäki (born 9 July 1977) is a Finnish football coach and a former professional footballer, who played as a defensive midfielder. He was capped five times for Finland national football team during 2005–2006.

== Club career ==
Uusimäki started playing in local clubs GBK and KPV in Kokkola.

After playing for other Ostrobotnian clubs FF Jaro, Närpes Kraft and VPS in the second-tier Ykkönen and top-tier Veikkausliiga, Uusimäki joined BK Häcken in Sweden in 2001. He spent three seasons with Häcken before signing with Allsvenskan club Örgryte IS for the 2005 season, after the recommendation by the team's head coach Jukka Ikäläinen.

On 15 January 2007, Uusimäki signed a one-and-a-half-year deal with Austrian Bundesliga club Grazer AK. However, due to the club's severe financial problems, he terminated his contract next summer. Grazer AK was later banned from participating in competitions, and eventually dissolved.

In June 2007, Uusimäki returned to Finland and signed a two-and-a-half-year deal with his former club KPV. He retired after the 2009 season.

== International career ==
Uusimäki was a regular Finnish youth international, before debuting with the Finland senior national team in 2005, aged 28.

== Coaching career ==
Later Uusimäki has worked as a youth coach in KPV.

== Career statistics ==
=== Club ===
As of 21 February 2024

Appearances and goals by club, season and competition
Club	Season	League		
Club	Season	Division	Apps	Goals
KPV	1996	Kakkonen	19	6
GBK	1997	Ykkönen	19	1
Jaro	1998	Veikkausliiga	20	0
Närpes Kraft	1999	Ykkönen	23	1
VPS	2000	Veikkausliiga	28	1
VPS	2001	Veikkausliiga	15	0
VPS	Total		43	1
BK Häcken	2001	Allsvenskan	7	0
BK Häcken	2002	Superettan	29	0
BK Häcken	2003	Superettan	29	1
BK Häcken	2004	Superettan	29	2
BK Häcken	Total		94	3
Örgryte	2005	Allsvenskan	23	2
Örgryte	2006	Allsvenskan	22	0
Örgryte	Total		45	2
Grazer AK	2006–07	Austrian Bundesliga	11	0
KPV	2007	Ykkönen	17	2
KPV	2008	Ykkönen	18	2
KPV	2009	Ykkönen	25	2
KPV	Total		60	6
Career total			334	20

=== International ===
Finland
Year	Apps	Goals
2005	1	0
2006	4	0
Total	5	0
