= Joel Borgstrand =

Swedish football player

Personal information
- Full name: Joel Borgstrand
- Date of birth: November 10, 1972 (age 53)
- Place of birth: Sweden
- Height: 1.87 m (6 ft 2 in)
- Position: Defender

Youth career
- Halmstads BK

Senior career*
Years	Team	Apps	(Gls)
1991–2006	Halmstads BK	124	(3)
2007	BK Astrio	?	(?)
2008	IS Halmia	?	(?)
- * Club domestic league appearances and goals

Joel Borgstrand (born November 10, 1972) is a Swedish football player, who played defender for Halmstads BK. Borgstrand started his playing career in Halmstads BK in 1991, at the age of 20; he had earlier played his way up through the club's youth system. He made his debut in 1992 against BK Häcken, (1-0), and in 1994 he was an ordinary in the team. However, his career has been full of injuries which have stopped him from playing. In 1995, he was with the team that won the cup, however due to few games played in 1997 and 2000, according to Swedish football rules, he was not awarded a medal when the club won Allsvenskan. In 2004 when Halmstad was close to win the league again, Borgstrand was in the team and played more than enough games to gain a medal. But in 2005 and 2006, he was kept from appearing for the club due to injuries yet again.

In 2007, he decided he was too old and needed to slow down and therefore left the club to play for local club BK Astrio, then in 2008 he signed with IS Halmia.
