= Kenni Olsen =

Danish footballer (born 1985)

Personal information
- Date of birth: 11 June 1985 (age 41)
- Place of birth: Hvidovre, Denmark
- Height: 1.85 m (6 ft 1 in)
- Position: Midfielder

Team information
- Current team: Herlev IF

Senior career*
Years	Team	Apps	(Gls)
2004–2006	AB		
2006–2011	FC Nordsjælland	24	(1)
2008–2009	→ AB (loan)	6	(1)
2011–	Herlev IF		
- * Club domestic league appearances and goals as of 18 May 2010

Kenni Olsen (born 11 June 1985) is a Danish professional football midfielder, who currently plays for Danish 2nd Division East side Herlev IF.
