= Sebastian Johansson =

Swedish footballer

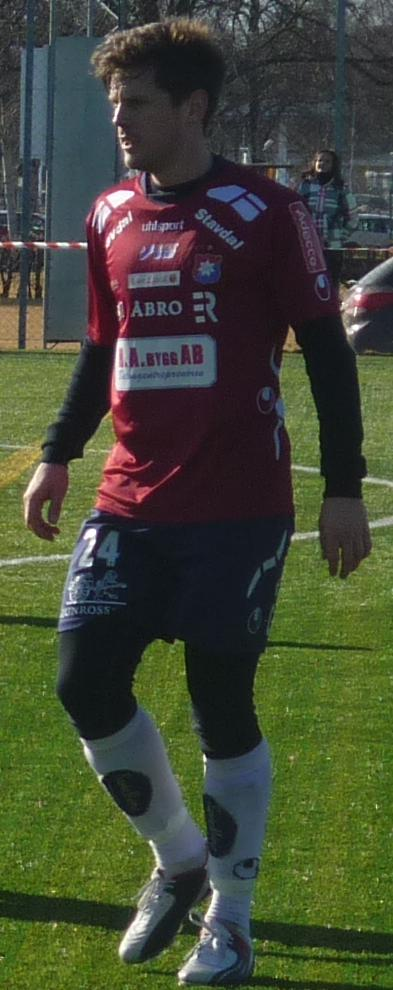
- Sebastian Johansson in 2011

Personal information
- Date of birth: 4 September 1980 (age 46)
- Place of birth: Sweden
- Height: 1.78 m (5 ft 10 in)
- Position: Midfielder

Team information
- Current team: Örgryte IS
- Number: 24

Youth career
- –1996: Ulricehamns IFK

Senior career*
Years	Team	Apps	(Gls)
1997–2005	IFK Göteborg	103	(4)
2006–2007	Malatyaspor	46	(2)
2007–2009	Halmstads BK	44	(1)
2009	→Örgryte IS (Loan)	14	(1)
2010–2013	Örgryte IS		
2013–	Utsiktens BK		
- * Club domestic league appearances and goals as of 26 May 2013 ‡ National team caps and goals as of 20:34, 19 August 2009 (UTC)

Sebastian Johansson (born 4 September 1980) is a Swedish football player, who plays midfielder for Örgryte IS.

== Career ==
Starting his career in Ulricehamns IFK, he moved to Swedish side IFK Göteborg in 1997, he played for the club until 2005 and won Stora Silvret (eng: the big silver) in 2005, Lilla silvret (eng: the little silver) in 2004 and bronze in 2001, in 2006 he joined Turkish club Malatyaspor and played for the club both in the Süper Lig and the Bank Asya 1. Lig, before returning home to Sweden and Halmstads BK.

On 14 July 2009 Johansson was officially loan to Örgryte IS, with the reasons that he could not settle in Halmstad and the lack of playing time, he would play for Örgryte IS the rest of the season. On 11 January 2010 Örgryte IS announced that Sebastian Johansson had signed a 3-year contract with the club for an undisclosed fee.

He is nicknamed Seb by the IFK Göteborg supporters.

== Achievements ==
IFK Göteborg:

- Allsvenskan:

- Stora Silvret (eng: big silver (2nd)): 2005
- Lilla Silvret (eng: little silver (3rd)): 2004
- Bronze: 2001

- Royal League

- Runner-up: 2005
