= Robin Cederberg =

Swedish footballer

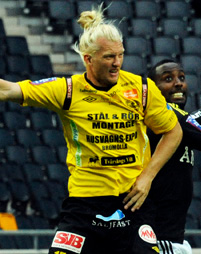

Personal information
- Full name: Martin Robin Cederberg
- Date of birth: 25 February 1983 (age 43)
- Place of birth: Sweden
- Height: 1.88 m (6 ft 2 in)
- Position: Defender

Team information
- Current team: IFÖ Bromölla IF

Youth career
- Hoby GIF

Senior career*
Years	Team	Apps	(Gls)
2002–2013	Mjällby AIF	225	(4)
2014	Husqvarna FF	29	(7)
2015	Mjällby AIF	18	(1)
2016–2017	Notodden FK	20	(0)
2017–	IFÖ Bromölla IF	0	(0)
- * Club domestic league appearances and goals as of 11 March 2016

Robin Cederberg (born 25 February 1983) is a Swedish footballer who plays for IFÖ Bromölla IF as a defender.
