= Björn Anklev =

Swedish footballer

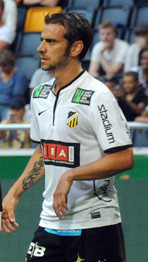

Personal information
- Full name: Björn Håkan Anklev
- Date of birth: 13 April 1979 (age 47)
- Place of birth: Sweden
- Height: 1.74 m (5 ft 9 in)
- Positions: Midfielder; forward

Youth career
- IK Tun
- Vrena IF
- Nyköpings BIS

Senior career*
Years	Team	Apps	(Gls)
–2003	Nyköpings BIS		
2004–2007	Halmstads BK	59	(3)
2008–2011	Örgryte IS	83	(19)
2011–2014	BK Häcken	90	(10)
2015–2016	Örgryte IS	50	(3)
- * Club domestic league appearances and goals

Björn Anklev (born 13 April 1979) is a Swedish former football player who played as a midfielder.

== Career ==
Anklev started his career at IK Tun in a small community outside of Nyköping. He then switched to Vrena IF to play in their youth squad before moving to Nyköping at the age of 15 where he joined Nyköpings BIS. While he was doing his Military service in 1998-1999 he played for a Division 5 club but returned to Nyköpings BIS afterwards. In the fall of 2003 he was contacted by Halmstads BK assistant manager Janne Andersson who invited him to come and train with them. In 2004, he made the move to Halmstads BK where the club just missed out on the league title in his first season at the club. he missed the entire 2006 season due to an ACL injury. He grew tired of starting most games on the bench so in 2008 he signed for Örgryte IS as a free agent after his contract with Halmstads BK ended.
