= Emil Jensen (footballer) =

Swedish footballer

Personal information
- Full name: Emil Jensen
- Date of birth: 19 June 1979 (age 47)
- Place of birth: Sweden
- Height: 1.75 m (5 ft 9 in)
- Position: Defender

Youth career
- 1993: BK Astrio
- 1994–1997: Halmstads BK

Senior career*
Years	Team	Apps	(Gls)
1998–2009	Halmstads BK	112	(2)
2010–2013	Falkenbergs FF	51	(0)
- * Club domestic league appearances and goals as of 24 November 2013 ‡ National team caps and goals as of 20:02, 19 August 2009 (UTC)

Emil Jensen (born 19 June 1979) is a Swedish former professional footballer who played as a defender.

== Career ==
Started his career in BK Astrio and, as many others talented players, moved in 1994 to local rivals Halmstads BK's youth team, had to wait until 2001 for his first league game, IFK Norrköping (4-0), was for some time constantly in the team's line-up, but during a training session in 2006 his anterior cruciate ligament was torn. This kept him out of the entire 2007 soccer season and he also missed the major part of the 2008 season due to this, he only played one game in 2008 against IFK Luleå in Svenska Cupen. Fully healed prior to the 2009 season, he had only played in friendly and cup matches for Halmstads BK. On 3 November 2009 Halmstas BK announced that they would not renew his contract hand he would leave the club.

On 12 December 2009 Falkenbergs FF confirmed that they had signed a contract with Emil Jensen.

When Emil was born his father, John Jensen, played in Allsvenskan with IS Halmia.

== Achievements ==
Halmstads BK:

- Allsvenskan:
  - Stora Silvret (2nd): 2004
