= Per Johansson (footballer, born 1978) =

Swedish footballer

- Per "Texas" Johansson in 2008

Personal information
- Full name: Per Johansson
- Date of birth: 6 May 1978 (age 48)
- Place of birth: Sweden
- Height: 1.87 m (6 ft 2 in)
- Positions: Defender; wingback

Youth career
- –1988: IFK Värnamo

Senior career*
Years	Team	Apps	(Gls)
1989–1997	Tranås FF		
1998–2000	GAIS	33	(0)
2001–2010	Halmstads BK	136	(6)
2011	Falkenbergs FF	25	(2)
- * Club domestic league appearances and goals as of 17:10, 19 August 2009 (UTC) ‡ National team caps and goals as of 17:10, 19 August 2009 (UTC)

Per Johansson (born 6 May 1978), a.k.a. Texas, is a Swedish former football player, who finished his career as a defender for Falkenbergs FF. Before that he played for Halmstads BK and Gais.

== Career ==
Per started his career in IFK Värnamo, then moved to Tranås FF in 1989 and stayed there for 6 years. In 1998, he signed for GAIS, then in second division. He played with them until they were relegated from Allsvenskan 2 years later. He then signed for Halmstads BK in 2001, but did not play his first match until the following year against Elfsborg (0–1). He scored the first goal for the club in the 2006 season in the 7th round. In 2007, during a league game against Örebro SK he broke his foot and missed the rest of the season.

In 2008, he signed a new contract keeping him in the club until 2010. On 10 August Halmstads BK announced that the club and Johansson both had agreed on not renewing his contract that he would leave the club after the season, Johansson also stated that he would continue play football on top level and intended to become a full licensed coach. On 10 December 2010 he signed a contract with Superetta club Falkenbergs FF.

=== "Texas" ===
While playing for GAIS he was given the nickname Texas after a local jazz musician whose name is also Per Johansson and also nicknamed Texas.

== Achievements ==
Halmstads BK:

- Allsvenskan:

- Stora Silvret (2nd): 2004
