= Laholms FK =

Swedish football club

- Full name: Laholms Fotbollklubb
- Founded: 1957
- Ground: Glänninge Park; Laholm; Sweden
- Head coach: Mats Gustavsson
- Coach: Andreas Thedenby
- League: Ettan Södra
Home colours	Away colours

Laholms FK is a Swedish football club located in Laholm in Halland County.

== Background ==
Laholms Fotbollklubb was formed on 3 May 1957 following the merger of Laholms Bollklubb (LBK) and Laholms Idrottsförening (LIF). The club has had some prominent coaches in Jan Andersson, now head coach of IFK Norrköping, and Magnus Haglund, who went to IF Elfsborg. The club runs 18 to 20 teams and has around 400 members.

Since their foundation Laholms FK has participated mainly in the middle and lower divisions of the Swedish football league system. The club currently plays in Division 3 Sydvästra Götaland which is the fifth tier of Swedish football. They play their home matches at the Glänninge Park in Laholm.

Laholms FK are affiliated to Hallands Fotbollförbund.

== Recent history ==
In recent seasons Laholms FK have competed in the following divisions:

2011 – Division III, Sydvästra Götaland
2010 – Division III, Sydvästra Götaland
2009 – Division III, Sydvästra Götaland
2008 – Division II, Västra Götaland
2007 – Division II, Södra Götaland
2006 – Division II, Södra Götaland
2005 – Division II, Södra Götaland
2004 – Division II, Södra Götaland
2003 – Division II, Södra Götaland
2002 – Division II, Södra Götaland
2001 – Division II, Södra Götaland
2000 – Division III, Sydvästra Götaland
1999 – Division II, Södra Götaland
1998 – Division II, Södra Götaland
1997 – Division II, Södra Götaland
1996 – Division III, Sydvästra Götaland
1995 – Division III, Sydvästra Götaland
1994 – Division III, Södra Götaland
1993 – Division III, Sydvästra Götaland

== Attendances ==
In recent seasons Laholms FK have had the following average attendances:

Season	Average Attendance	Division / Section	Level
2005	285	Div 2 Södra Götaland	Tier 3
2006	207	Div 2 Södra Götaland	Tier 4
2007	241	Div 2 Södra Götaland	Tier 4
2008	215	Div 2 Västra Götaland	Tier 4
2009	250	Div 3 Sydvästra Götaland	Tier 5
2010	282	Div 3 Sydvästra Götaland	Tier 5

* Attendances are provided in the Publikliga sections of the Svenska Fotbollförbundet website.
