= Tibor Joza =

Swedish footballer

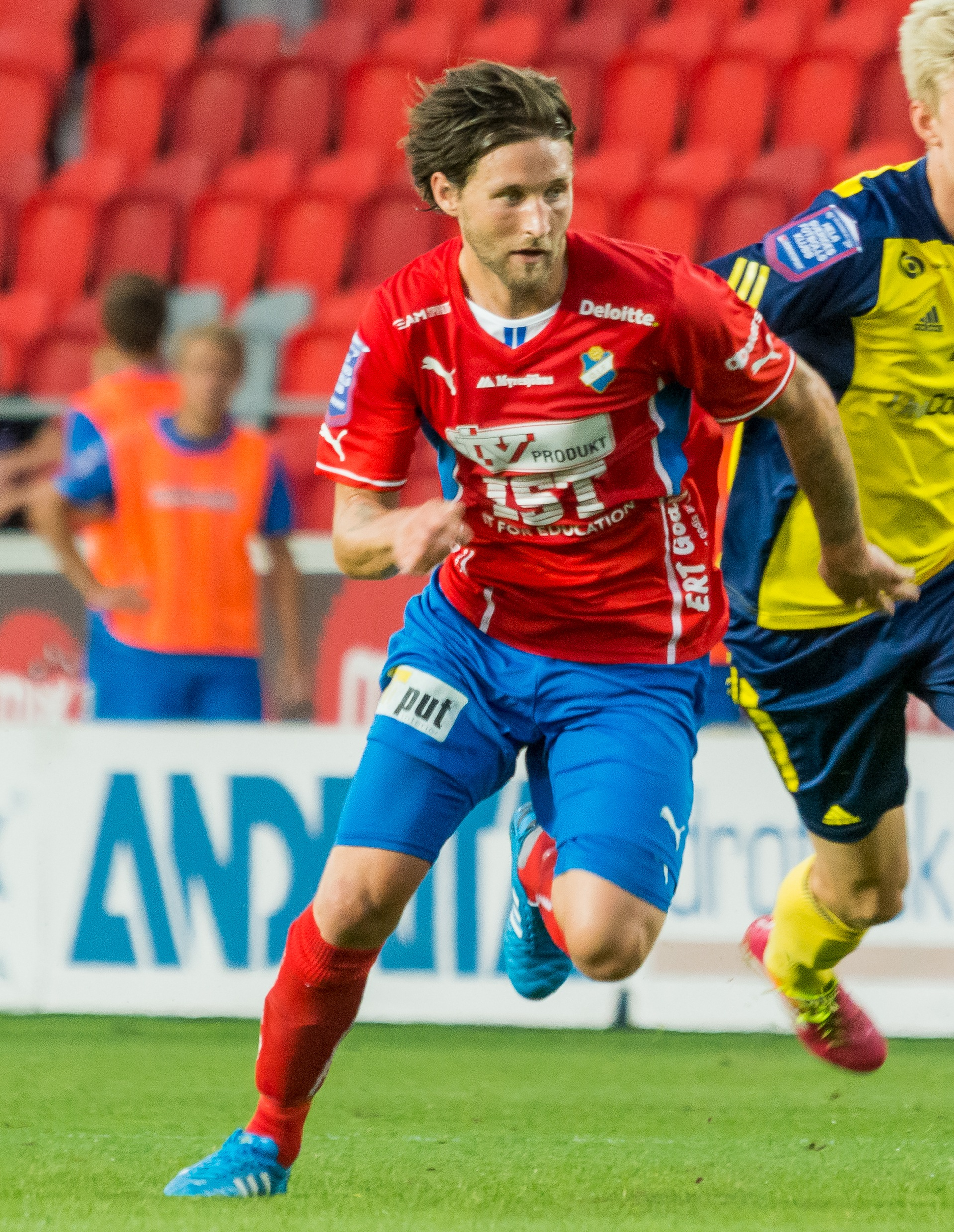

Personal information
- Full name: Tibor Brink-Joza
- Date of birth: 10 August 1986 (age 40)
- Place of birth: Halmstad, Sweden
- Height: 1.76 m (5 ft 9 in)
- Position: Defender

Youth career
- 2001: IF Leikin
- 2002–2004: Halmstads BK

Senior career*
Years	Team	Apps	(Gls)
2004–2007	Halmstads BK	7	(0)
2008–2010	Falkenbergs FF	79	(2)
2011–2013	BK Häcken	25	(0)
2014–2020	Falkenbergs FF	124	(1)
2014	→ Östers IF (loan)	12	(0)

International career
2007	Sweden U21	1	(0)
- * Club domestic league appearances and goals as of 30 November 2017

Tibor Joza (born 10 August 1986 in Halmstad) is a Swedish football player of Hungarian descent, who played as a defender. Joza has played for the Sweden U21s once, in a friendly 2-1 loss against Malta U21.

He started his career in IF Leikin, in 2002 he was signed by Halmstads BK, making his debut for the senior team in 2004. He was linked to Danish Kolding FC, however in December 2007 he signed a contract with Falkenbergs FF in Superettan. Following two successful seasons with Falkenberg he attracted the attention of Allsvenskan again and on November 10, 2010 BK Häcken confirmed the signing of Joza.
