= Hjalmar Öhagen =

Swedish footballer

Personal information
- Full name: Hjalmar Öhagen
- Date of birth: 17 May 1985 (age 41)
- Place of birth: Järbo, Sweden
- Height: 1.75 m (5 ft 9 in)
- Position: Midfielder

Youth career
- 1998: Järbo IF

Senior career*
Years	Team	Apps	(Gls)
1999–2006	Sandvikens IF		
2007–2008	Halmstads BK	16	(0)
2008	→ Ängelholms FF(loan)	14	(1)
2009–2012	Gefle IF	31	(0)
2013–2017	Sandvikens IF	82	(7)
- * Club domestic league appearances and goals

Hjalmar Öhagen (born 17 May 1985) is a Swedish retired football player who played midfielder.

== Career ==
Öhagen started playing football in Järbo IF but at the age of 14 moved to the Division 2 club Sandvikens IF, where he played from 1999 to 2006. During 2006 he was on trial at Halmstads BK who decided to sign him for the 2007 season.

On 28 July 2008 Halmstads BK confirmed that he would be loaned out to Ängelholms FF for the rest of the season. Not being able to take a place in Halmstads BK, Hjalmar started looking for others club to play in. Ängelholm wished to keep him, but he wanted to keep playing in Allsvenskan. On 2 December Halmstads BK confirmed that he had signed a contract with Gefle IF.

Nearing the end of his contract with Gefle IF, Öhagen's old club Sandvikens IF was interested in bringing him back to the club. They brought him on 29 August 2012.

Öhagen retired in December 2017.

== Honours ==
=== Individual ===
Sweden

Sandvikens IF
- Best midfielder in Division 2: 2006
