= Marcus Sahlman =

Swedish footballer

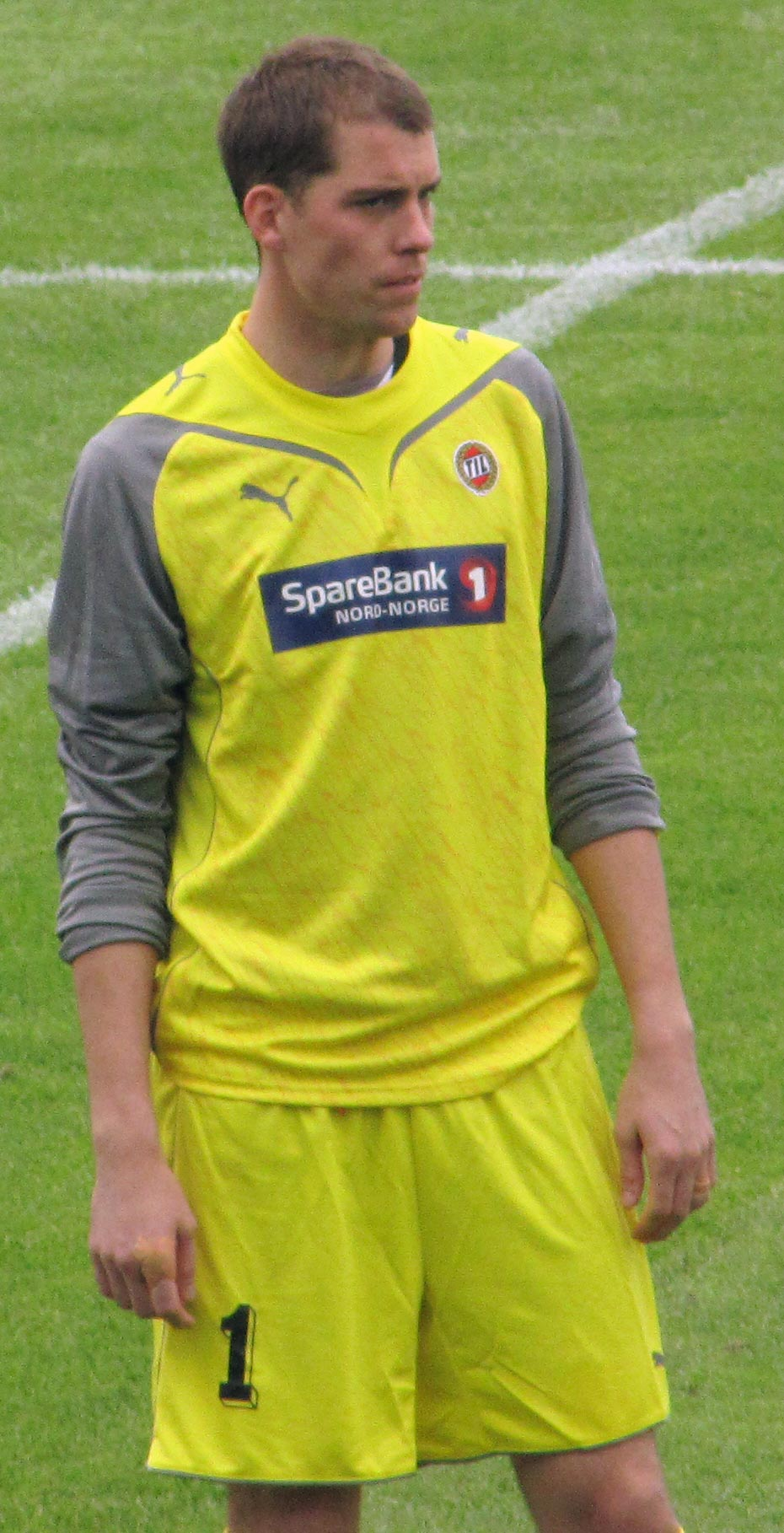
- Sahlman in 2009

Personal information
- Full name: Marcus Verner Sahlman
- Date of birth: 2 January 1985 (age 41)
- Place of birth: Umeå, Sweden
- Height: 1.97 m (6 ft 6 in)
- Position: Goalkeeper

Youth career
- –2002: Halmstads BK

Senior career*
Years	Team	Apps	(Gls)
2003–2008	Halmstads BK	26	(0)
2007	→ Trelleborgs FF (loan)	11	(0)
2008	→ Trelleborgs FF (loan)	14	(0)
2009–2014	Tromsø	87	(0)
2014–2015	Norrköping	8	(0)
2015	IS Halmia	11	(0)

International career
2000–2001	Sweden U17	11	(0)
2002–2003	Sweden U19	13	(0)
2004–2006	Sweden U21	4	(0)
- * Club domestic league appearances and goals

Marcus Sahlman (born 2 January 1985) is a Swedish former professional footballer who played as goalkeeper.

== Career ==
Sahlman started his career with Halmstads BK, where he made his debut in 2004 in an away game against Malmö FF as forward rather than his usual position of goalkeeper. During 2006 season he played about half the league matches and Conny Johansson played the rest. After the club signed Magnus Bahne in 2007, Sahlman demanded to be put on the transfer list as he wanted to play first team football. He tried out for AGOVV Apeldoorn in the Netherlands but failed to secure a contract, he then went on loan to Trelleborgs FF for the rest of the season.

In 2008, in the absence of Magnus Bahne, he started all the league games until after the Euro 2008 championship and the return of Bahne, when he again became second choice to Bahne.

On 2 July 2008, it was reported that he was in Norway trying out for Tippeligaen team Tromsø IL. On 13 July 2008, Tromsø IL confirmed signing him in spite of competition from other teams, and on 14 July this was confirmed by Halmstads BK, he signed a three-year contract starting 1 January 2009 with no compensation fee for Halmstads BK as he transferred under the Bosman ruling.

On 19 July 2008, Halmstads BK reported that he would go on loan rest of the season to Trelleborgs FF.

Sahlman missed out on most of the 2009 season due to injury. Having started the 2010 season as second choice for Tromsø IL, he soon displaced Sead Ramović as first choice and was named man of the match by the supporters club after the match against VIF. Tromsø IL did not lose a single match when Sahlman played. This has led Tromsø IL's manager Per-Mathias Høgmo to openly speak out in the media and say that Sahlman should be Sweden's first choice goalkeeper.

Before the team's match against Rosenborg BK, Sahlman was the target of cruel taunts by their forward Rade Prica, where Prica claimed he "had never even heard of Sahlman, knew nothing of him where he had played or anything, and that he would score goals against him", Prica missed the game through injury.

== Career statistics ==
As of 7 October 2013

Appearances and goals by club, season and competition
Club	Season	League			National cup (Note: Includes Svenska Cupen, Norwegian Cup.)		Continental		Total	
Club	Season	Division	Apps	Goals	Apps	Goals	Apps	Goals	Apps	Goals
Halmstad	2003	Allsvenskan	–		–		–		0	0
Halmstad	2004	Allsvenskan	2	0	–		–		2	0
Halmstad	2005	Allsvenskan	–		–		–		0	0
Halmstad	2006	Allsvenskan	13	0	3	0	–		6	0
Halmstad	2007	Allsvenskan	–		2	0	–		2	0
Halmstad	2008	Allsvenskan	11	0	–		–		11	0
Halmstad	Total		26	0	5	0	0	0	31	0
Trelleborg (loan)	2007	Allsvenskan	11	0	–		–		11	0
Trelleborg (loan)	2008	Allsvenskan	14	0	–		–		14	0
Tromsø	2009	Tippeligaen	4	0	2	0	2	0	8	0
Tromsø	2010	Tippeligaen	24	0	4	0	–		28	0
Tromsø	2011	Tippeligaen	24	0	2	0	1	0	26	0
Tromsø	2012	Tippeligaen	9	0	4	0	5	0	18	0
Tromsø	2013	Tippeligaen	26	0	1	0	9	0	36	0
Tromsø	Total		87	0	13	0	17	0	117	0
Norrköping	2014	Allsvenskan	1	0	0	0	0	0	1	0
Career total			139	0	18	0	17	0	174	0
