= Emra Tahirović =

Swedish footballer

Personal information
- Date of birth: 31 July 1987 (age 39)
- Place of birth: Sarajevo, SFR Yugoslavia
- Height: 1.88 m (6 ft 2 in)
- Position: Striker

Team information
- Current team: Pålsboda GOIF
- Number: 99

Youth career
- Sturehov
- 2002–2003: Örebro

Senior career*
Years	Team	Apps	(Gls)
2004–2006	Örebro	21	(4)
2006–2007	Halmstad	30	(7)
2007–2008	Lille	2	(0)
2008	→ FC Zürich (loan)	16	(2)
2008–2011	FC Zürich	2	(0)
2009	→ Örebro (loan)	9	(1)
2010	→ MVV (loan)	5	(1)
2010–2011	→ Castellón (loan)	6	(0)
2013	FC Wil	16	(3)
2021-	Pålsboda	14	(11)

International career
2007–2009	Sweden U21	2	(0)
- * Club domestic league appearances and goals as of 15 May 2011

Emra Tahirović (born 31 July 1987) is a Swedish footballer of Bosnian origin who plays as a striker for Pålsboda GOIF. Tahirović has played in the top divisions of Swedish, French and Swiss football.

== Early life ==
Tahirović was born in Sarajevo but fled to Sweden upon the outbreak of the Bosnian War. He was raised in Örebro, Sweden.

== Club career ==
Tahirović started to play for local club IK Sturehov and at the age of 14 moved to Örebro SK. After failing to become a "starting eleven" player he moved to Halmstads BK in 2006. Prior to signing with HBK he had been on trial with his future club FC Zürich and also Werder Bremen, but wanted to continue his development in the Swedish Allsvenskan before joining the larger European clubs. During his tenure with HBK he played mainly as a substitute. .

In 2007, he drew the attention of Lille OSC in the French Ligue 1 and was later signed for 15 million SEK. After playing only two matches with the club, he was loaned to Swiss side FC Zurich in January 2008 for the remainder of the season. At the end of the season he signed permanently for FC Zurich.

In 2009, he went on loan back to Örebro SK in Allsvenskan and turned back in December 2009 to FC Zürich. In January 2010 Tahirović left the Swiss club again and signed a half-year loan deal with MVV Maastricht.
