= Magnus Arvidsson (footballer) =

Swedish former professional footballer

Lars Magnus Arvidsson
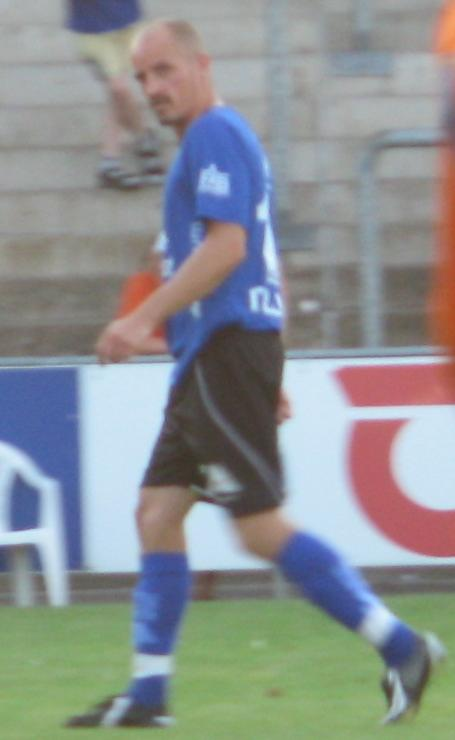
- Arvidsson while at Halmstads BK

Personal information
- Date of birth: 12 February 1973 (age 53)
- Place of birth: Sweden
- Height: 1.75 m (5 ft 9 in)
- Position: Forward

Youth career
- –1991: Förslövs IF

Senior career*
Years	Team	Apps	(Gls)
1992–1994	Helsingborgs IF	16	(2)
1995–1997	IFK Hässleholm	78	(44)
1998–1999	Trelleborgs FF	36	(12)
1999–2006	Hansa Rostock	181	(31)
2006–2008	Halmstads BK	58	(13)
2009	Helsingborgs IF	0	(0)
Total		369	(102)

International career
2000	Sweden	2	(0)
- * Club domestic league appearances and goals

Lars Magnus Arvidsson (born 12 February 1973) is a Swedish former professional footballer who played as a forward. He is known for holding the record for the fastest hat-trick ever.

== Club career ==
Arvidsson started his career in Förslövs IF and played there until 1991 when he moved to Helsingborgs IF, then playing in the league now known as Superettan (the second division of Sweden) He stayed with the team when they got promoted to Allsvenskan in 1993 but played only a handful of matches before leaving for IFK Hässleholm in 1995. He stayed there for three seasons. During the 1995 season, he scored a hat trick against Landskrona BoIS in just 89 seconds, setting the currently unbroken record for the fastest hat-trick ever. In 1998, he moved to Trelleborgs FF. In 1999, he left Trelleborg for German club Hansa Rostock, then playing in the Bundesliga. He is, with a total of 27 goals, the player who has scored the most goals for Rostock in the Bundesliga. He followed Rostock down into the 2. Bundesliga after the 2004–05 season, and stayed at the club until the summer of 2006. Then, he returned home to Sweden where he signed a contract with Halmstads BK until the end of the 2008 season.

In August 2008, it was reported that Arvidsson would miss the rest of the season due to a knee injury that went unnoticed until a meniscus operation.

Arvidsson was offered a half-year contract by Halmstad on 3 January 2009, however, on 13 January it was reported that he had signed a half-year contract with his former club, Helsingborgs IF. On 30 May 2009, Arvidsson announced on Helsingborg's homepage that he would quit football due to another long-term knee injury. He also said that he would first take a break to be with his family and then study to become a coach.

== International career ==
He made two appearances for Sweden, both in friendly games in 2000 to prepare the squad for Euro 2000. In the first he came on as a substitute against Italy and in the second he started against Austria.
