= Ajsel Kujović =

Swedish footballer

Personal information
- Full name: Ajsel Kujović
- Date of birth: 1 March 1986 (age 40)
- Place of birth: Bijelo Polje, SR Montenegro, SFR Yugoslavia
- Height: 1.96 m (6 ft 5 in)
- Position: Striker

Youth career
- 1994–1999: Klippans BoIF
- 2000–2004: Landskrona BoIS
- 2004–2006: Feyenoord

Senior career*
| Years | Team | Apps | (Gls) |
| 2005–2006 | Feyenoord | 0 | (0) |
| 2006–2010 | Halmstad | 64 | (7) |
| 2011 | Landskrona | 24 | (7) |
| 2012 | Höganäs | 14 | (9) |
| 2015 | Varberg | 12 | (0) |
| 2015 | Åtvidaberg | 10 | (0) |
| 2016–2017 | Varberg | 0 | (0) |

International career
| 2006–2008 | Sweden U21 | 3 | (0) |
- * Club domestic league appearances and goals

Ajsel Kujović (Cyrillic: Ајсел Кујовић; born 1 March 1986) is a Swedish former footballer who played as a forward.

Kujović has a younger brother, Emir Kujović, who played for Swedish club Djurgårdens IF.

== Club career ==
Born in Bijelo Polje, his family moved to Sweden when he was 6 years old. At the age of 8 he started to play for Klippans BoIF. In 2000, he moved to Landskrona BoIS and was signed by Dutch club Feyenoord in 2004 at the age of 18. However, in 2006 he returned home to Sweden where he signed with Halmstads BK. On 3 November 2009 Halmstas BK announced that they would not renew his contract and that he would leave the club.

For the 2011 season Kujović signed with Superettan club Landskrona BoIS, where he stayed for a season. Kujović left Landskrona and where for some time close to sign for Bulgarian club Lokomotiv Plovdiv, however this failed and Kujović was forced to look for another club, eventually signing for Swedish Division 3 club Höganäs BK.

Kujović currently works as a football agent and represents, among others, Camil Jebara, Rasmus Cronvall, and Amr Kaddoura.
