= Jesper Westerberg =

Swedish footballer (born 1986)

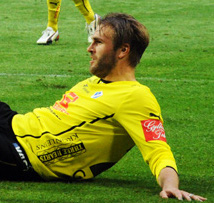

Personal information
- Date of birth: 1 February 1986 (age 40)
- Place of birth: Kristianstad, Sweden
- Height: 1.83 m (6 ft 0 in)
- Position: Right back

Youth career
- Arkelstorps IF
- IFÖ Bromölla IF

Senior career*
Years	Team	Apps	(Gls)
2003–2005	Landskrona BoIS	1	(0)
2005	→ IFK Hässleholm (loan)		
2006–2009	Halmstads BK	61	(2)
2009	Landskrona BoIS	30	(0)
2010–2011	Mjällby AIF	57	(0)
2012–2013	Lillestrøm SK	12	(0)
2013–2019	Halmstads BK	175	(4)

International career
2002–2003	Sweden U17	16	(2)
2004–2005	Sweden U19	13	(0)
2006–2008	Sweden U21	9	(0)
- * Club domestic league appearances and goals

Jesper Westerberg (born 1 February 1986) is a Swedish retired footballer who played as a right back.

== Career ==
Started his career in Arkelstorps IF before moving to IFÖ Bromölla IF, and later on to Landskrona BoIS. In 2003, he made his first appearance in the Swedish highest league Allsvenskan, but he played only one match for the club between 2003 and 2005, during the 2005 season he was loaned out to IFK Hässleholm and in 2006 he joined Halmstads BK.

On 4 October 2008 Westerberg said that he would not renew his contract with Halmstads BK, which ended after the 2008 season, on 20 March 2009 Landskrona confirmed that Westerberg had signed a one-year contract with the club. After one year in Landskrona he moved to Mjällby AIF.

In December 2011 it was announced that Westerberg had signed a contract with the Norwegian club Lillestrøm SK.

== Retirement ==
On 23 October 2019 Halmstads BK confirmed, that 33-year old Westerberg had decided to retire at the end of the season. However, the club announced on 7 January 2020, that Westerberg would continue at the club in a different role as a salesman in the club's marketing department.
