= Hasse Mattisson =

Swedish footballer (born 1972)

Personal information
- Full name: Hans Åke Krister Mattisson
- Date of birth: 29 August 1972 (age 54)
- Place of birth: Malmö, Sweden
- Height: 1.75 m (5 ft 9 in)
- Position: Midfielder

Youth career
- –1995: Husie IF

Senior career*
Years	Team	Apps	(Gls)
1996–2006	Malmö FF	201	(21)
2006–2007	Halmstad BK	40	(2)
2008–2009	Dalby GIF	?	(?)
2009	Malmö FF	0	(0)
2009	→ IFK Malmö (loan)	0	(0)
2009	→ Husie IF (loan)	?	(?)

International career
1997	Sweden B	1	(0)

Managerial career
- 2008–2009: Dalby GIF (playing assistant manager)
- 2009: IFK Malmö (playing-manager)
- 2014–2015: FC Rosengård 1917
- * Club domestic league appearances and goals

Hans Åke Krister "Hasse" Mattisson (born 29 August 1972) is a Swedish former football player and football coach best known for playing for Malmö FF and working as a staff member there.

== Club career ==
Mattisson came to Malmö FF from Husie IF in 1995 and remained in the club for a decade, and was the team captain during the Superettan season of 2000. In August 2006, he left Malmö FF for Halmstad BK; the move came as a shock for MFF supporters, who held Mattisson in very high regard. Nevertheless, Mattisson received enormous applause from the supporters who had travelled to Halmstad to watch him play against Malmö the following month, both before and after the game. At the end of the 2007 season, Mattisson announced that he would retire from professional football and had signed a new deal with MFF, working for their marketing department.

== International career ==
Mattisson appeared once for the Sweden B team.

== Managerial career ==
Following a co-operation deal with Malmö FF and former rivals IFK Malmö, the club announced that Mattisson would join IFK Malmö as assistant player-manager alongside MFF teammate Jörgen Ohlsson - the co-operation was broken in 2009, with Mattisson and Ohlsson being relieved of their coaching duties. Mattisson later played half a season for his youth club Husie IF in the fall of 2009. He worked last as the head coach of FC Rosengård 1917, until July 2015.

== Honours ==
Malmö FF

- Allsvenskan: 2004
