= Martin Fribrock =

Swedish football midfielder

Personal information
- Full name: Martin Fribrock
- Date of birth: 28 August 1984 (age 42)
- Place of birth: Sjöbo, Sweden
- Height: 1.80 m (5 ft 11 in)
- Positions: Midfielder; winger

Youth career
- 1999: Askeröds IF

Senior career*
Years	Team	Apps	(Gls)
2000–2004	Helsingborgs IF	46	(0)
2005–2008	Halmstads BK	55	(6)
2008–2012	Esbjerg fB	4	(0)

International career^{‡}
2002–2006	Sweden U21	10	(1)
- * Club domestic league appearances and goals as of 16 August 2009 ‡ National team caps and goals as of 1 October 2009

Martin Fribrock (born 28 August 1984) is a Swedish football midfielder who plays as a midfielder and winger for FC Andrea Doria. He latest club was Esbjerg fB.

== Career ==
Starting his football career in Askeröds IF he moved to Allsvenskan and Helsingborgs IF in 2000 at the age of 16, he stayed with the club for 4 seasons, in 2005 he moved to Halmstads BK, however he got his first season destroyed when he got his ACL torn before the season started, later in 2005 he returned and have almost started every game since.

Summer 2008 Martin moved to Esbjerg fB in the Danish Superliga.

His younger brother, Henrik Fribrock, also played for Helsingborgs IF, however not on senior level, and is currently playing for Kristianstads FF.
