= Peter Larsson (footballer, born 1984) =

Swedish footballer

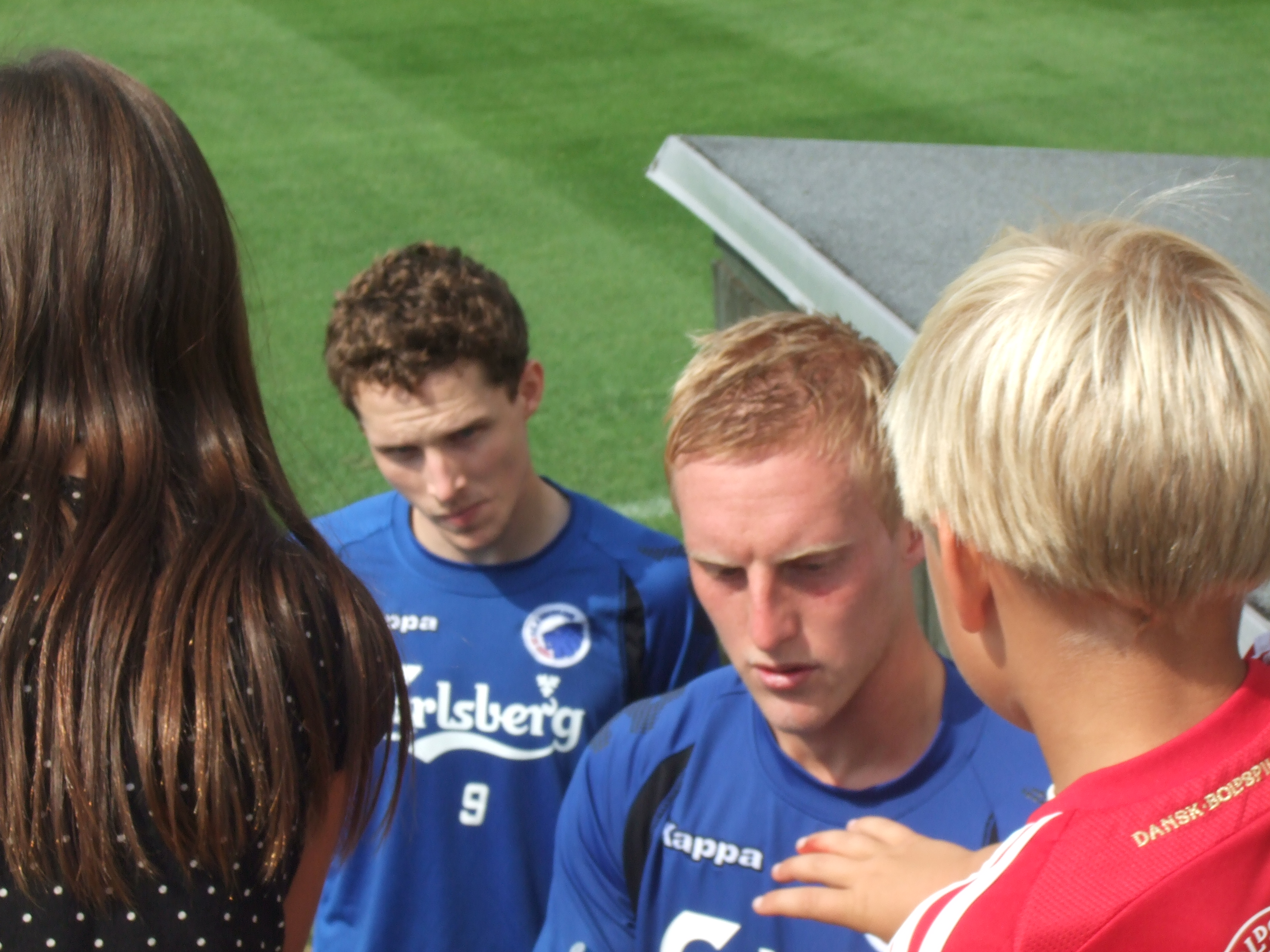

Personal information
- Full name: Peter Karl-Johan Larsson
- Date of birth: 30 April 1984 (age 42)
- Place of birth: Halmstad, Sweden
- Height: 1.87 m (6 ft 2 in)
- Position: Centre back

Youth career
- 1998: IF Centern
- 1999–2002: Halmstads BK

Senior career*
| Years | Team | Apps | (Gls) |
| 2003–2008 | Halmstads BK | 80 | (6) |
| 2008–2012 | Copenhagen | 24 | (0) |
| 2011 | → Helsingborgs IF (loan) | 21 | (4) |
| 2012–2017 | Helsingborgs IF | 117 | (5) |
| 2018–2019 | Halmstads BK | 47 | (1) |
| Total | | 289 | (16) |

International career
| 2004–2006 | Sweden U21 | 2 | (0) |
| 2008 | Sweden | 2 | (0) |
- * Club domestic league appearances and goals

Peter Karl-Johan Larsson (born 30 April 1984) is a Swedish former professional footballer who played as a centre back.

== Club career ==
Starting his football career in IF Centern, alongside Swedish tennis player Sofia Arvidsson, he then in 1999 moved to local rivals Halmstads BK's youth squad in which he played until 2002, he played his first league match against Hammarby IF (1–1), in August 2004, started during 2006 to take over Lithuanian national player Tomas Žvirgždauskas position in the team, placing Žvirgždauskas more and more on the bench as a substitute.

In 2007, when Brazil was in Sweden for a game against Chile and Ghana, Larsson was one of four Swedish league players that were allowed to do one training pass with the Brazilian squad, the other players where Samuel Holmén, Johan Karlsson and Ari Da Silva.

On 25 July 2008, Larsson and Halmstad agreed a deal with Copenhagen, where he signed a five-year long contract.

On 5 September 2019, 35-year old Larsson announced that he would retire at the end of the season.

== International career ==
He earned his first caps for the Sweden men's national football team in January 2008 when he played against Costa Rica and the United States. In the game against Costa Rica, he became the 1000th player to represent Sweden at top level.

== Honours ==
FC Copenhagen

- Danish Superliga: 2008–09, 2009–10
- Danish Cup: 2008–09, 2011–12
