= Dusan Djuric =

Swedish footballer of Serbian descent

Dušan Đurić
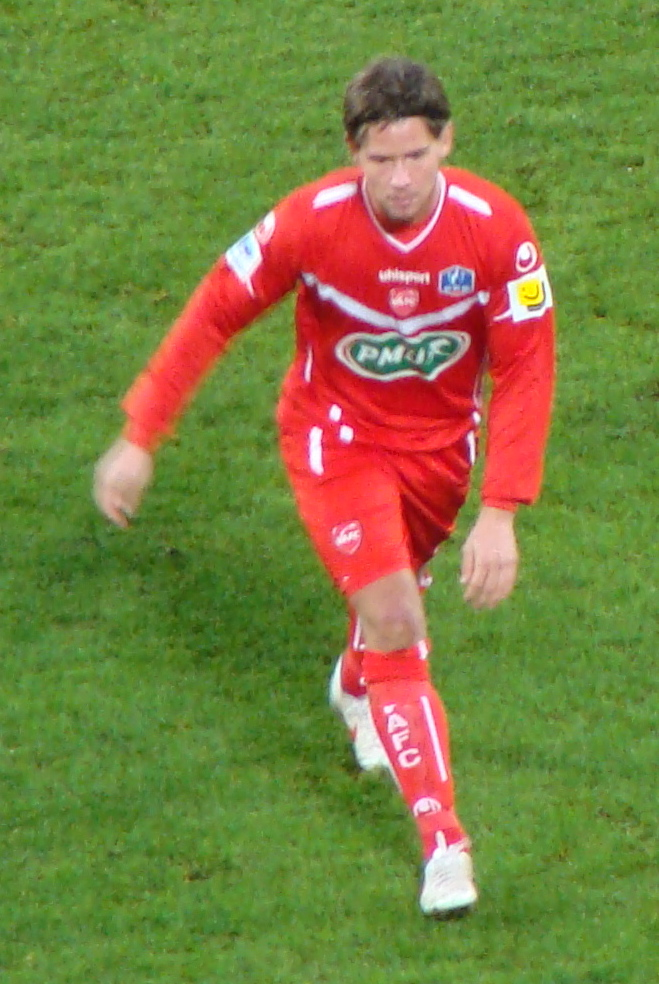

Personal information
- Full name: Dušan Predrag Đurić
- Date of birth: 16 September 1984 (age 42)
- Place of birth: Halmstad, Sweden
- Height: 1.81 m (5 ft 11 in)
- Position: Midfielder

Youth career
- Halmstad

Senior career*
Years	Team	Apps	(Gls)
2003–2007	Halmstad	116	(16)
2008–2012	Zürich	118	(28)
2012–2014	Valenciennes	5	(0)
2013–2014	→ OB Odense (loan)	2	(0)
2014–2015	Aarau	21	(2)
2016	Dalkurd	20	(2)
2017–2018	GAIS	43	(4)
2019–2021	Halmstad	45	(3)
Total		370	(55)

International career^{‡}
2004–2006	Sweden U21	21	(2)
2005–2010	Sweden	8	(0)
- * Club domestic league appearances and goals as of 11 December 2021 ‡ National team caps and goals as of 19:47, 9 September 2010 (UTC)

Dusan Predrag Djuric (Serbian Cyrillic: Душан Предраг Ђурић, romanized: Dušan Predrag Ðurić; born 16 September 1984) is a Swedish former professional footballer who plays as a midfielder. Starting off his career with Halmstads BK in Sweden, he went on to play professionally in Switzerland, Denmark, and France before returning retiring at Halmstad in 2021. He won eight caps for the Sweden national team between 2005 and 2010.

== Club career ==
=== Early career ===
Starting his career in Halmstads BK youth team, he was raised up to the senior team in 2003 and debuted against GIF Sundsvall in the premier game of the season, coming on as a substitute. Prior to the 2004 season, he had established himself as a player in the starting line-up and aided the club to become runner-up, two points behind Malmö FF. Djuric continued on as a starting player during the poor season of 2005, as Halmstads BK qualified for the 2005–06 UEFA Cup group stage, in which Djuric became the only goalscorer for the club, against Sampdoria. During the following seasons he started mainly as a midfielder but gradually stept up to become a forward.

=== Zürich ===
Following the UEFA Cup in 2005, Djuric attracted the attention of bigger clubs in Europe, such as Sporting CP, Real Sociedad and Anderlecht, however, he signed a contract with Swiss club Zürich on 7 January 2008.

Djuric gained somewhat instant glory at Zürich, following a goal against Milan on San Siro in the 2008–09 UEFA Cup first round, however, Milan won both matches with 4–1 totally. Djuric helpt Zürich win the 2008–09 season and then scored twice during the qualification rounds to the 2009–10 UEFA Champions League. Djuric playing in Zürich didn't go unnoticed and it was soon speculation once again that he would move to various clubs, among them Fiorentina, Montpellier and Valenciennes.

=== Valenciennes ===
On 13 January 2012, Valenciennes confirmed that they had signed him on a three-and a half-year-contract. After struggling with injuries, he joined Danish club Odense on loan for the 2013–14 season.

=== Aarau ===
At the end of the 2013–14 season, Djuric signed a one-year deal for Swiss club FC Aarau for an undisclosed fee.

=== Dalkurd FF ===
Ahead of the 2016 Superettan season, Djuric signed for Dalkurd FF where he ended up playing 20 games and scoring 2 goals.

=== GAIS ===
In 2017, Djuric signed for the Superettan club GAIS. Djuric left GAIS at the end of the 2018 season.

=== Return to Halmstads BK ===
On 26 February 2019, Djuric returned to Halmstads BK on a contract until the end of 2020.

== International career ==
=== Youth ===
Djuric made his debut for Sweden's U-21 team in 2004 against Portugals U-21 team on 17 February. He was also part of Sweden's squad to the 2004 UEFA European U-21 Championship, where Sweden finished fourth.

=== Senior ===
Djuric where called up to Sweden's national team prior to its January tour in United States in 2005, being placed on the bench against South Korea, he came on as a substitute against Mexico.

== Personal life ==
Djuric is of Serb descent, and his parents are from Loznica, Serbia.

== Career statistics ==
=== International ===
Appearances and goals by national team and year
National team	Year	Apps	Goals
Sweden	2005	1	0
Sweden	2006	2	0
Sweden	2007	2	0
Sweden	2008	1	0
Sweden	2009	1	0
Sweden	2010	1	0
Total		8	0

== Honours ==
FC Zürich

- Swiss Super League: 2008–09
