= Janne Andersson =

Swedish football player and manager (born 1962)

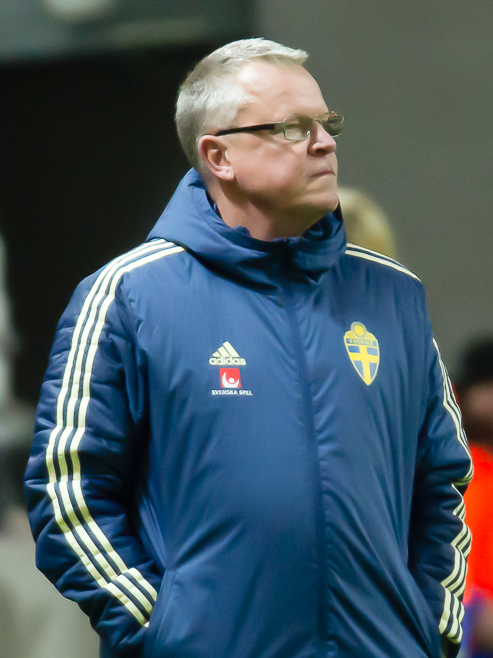
- Andersson managing Sweden in 2019

Personal information
- Full name: Jan Olof Andersson
- Date of birth: 29 September 1962 (age 64)
- Place of birth: Halmstad, Sweden
- Position: Forward

Senior career*
Years	Team	Apps	(Gls)
1979–1986	Alets IK		
1987	IS Halmia		
1988–1992	Alets IK		
1993	Laholms FK		

Managerial career
- 1988–1989: Alets IK (player manager)
- 1990–1992: Halmstads BK (assistant manager)
- 1993–1998: Laholms FK (player manager)
- 2000–2003: Halmstads BK (assistant manager)
- 2004–2009: Halmstads BK
- 2010: Örgryte IS
- 2011–2016: IFK Norrköping
- 2016–2023: Sweden
- * Club domestic league appearances and goals

Jan Olof "Janne" Andersson (Swedish: [ˈjânːɛ ˈânːdɛˌʂɔn]; born 29 September 1962) is a Swedish former professional football manager and player.

From 2004 to 2009, Andersson coached Halmstads BK in the Swedish top tier league. In 2010, he managed Örgryte in the second tier. In 2011, he was appointed as manager of IFK Norrköping, a team newly promoted to the top tier. In 2015, Andersson led the team to win the Allsvenskan title. He was appointed manager of the Sweden national team in 2016. They qualified when he was manager for the 2018 World Cup and 2020 Euro, although unsuccessful in qualifying for the 2022 World Cup and 2024 Euro competitions.

His former playing career lasted 14 years between 1979 and 1993 with different Swedish clubs.

== Playing career ==
Andersson spent the majority of his playing career with Alets IK, but also briefly represented IS Halma and Laholms FK. A prolific goalscorer, he is Alet IK's all-time highest goalscorer and scored five goals in his last-ever appearance for the club.

== Managerial career ==
=== Early career ===
During Andersson's early managerial years, he managed Alets IK and Laholms FK.

=== Halmstad ===
While at Halmstads BK, Andersson's team knocked out Portuguese giants Sporting CP in the UEFA Cup, who had made it all the way to the UEFA Cup final the previous year.

=== Örgryte ===
He took over Superettan team Örgryte IS in December 2009, who had just been relegated from Allsvenskan. During Andersson's stay at the club, Örgryte suffered from serious financial problems which eventually led their Superettan licence to be revoked. Andersson left the club after only one season.

=== IFK Norrköping ===
In 2011, Andersson was appointed as the manager for IFK Norrköping who were making their comeback in Allsvenskan after two seasons in Superettan. In 2015, he led Norrköping to win the league for the first time in 26 years after defeating defending champions Malmö FF away in the last game.

=== Sweden ===
Following Sweden's disappointing Euro 2016 display, Andersson took over as the head coach of the Sweden national team after almost seven years of Erik Hamrén being in charge.

==== 2018 World Cup ====
Under Andersson, Sweden qualified for its first FIFA World Cup in 12 years by eliminating the Netherlands and Italy during the qualification process. While at the 2018 World Cup, Sweden experienced its most successful World Cup campaign since 1994, winning Group F ahead of South Korea, Mexico, and reigning world champions Germany. Sweden eliminated Switzerland in the second round before losing to England in the quarter-final.

==== 2018–19 UEFA Nations League ====
During the 2018–19 UEFA Nations League campaign, Andersson and Sweden finished first in their UEFA Nations League B group ahead of Russia and Turkey, winning promotion to League A.

==== UEFA Euro 2020 ====
Under Andersson, Sweden qualified for its sixth consecutive UEFA European Championship by finishing second behind Spain in UEFA Euro 2020 qualifying Group F. Andersson would then lead Sweden to the top of UEFA Euro 2020 Group E undefeated after a 0–0 draw against Spain, a 1–0 win over Slovakia and a 3–2 win against Poland. The last of which included a 90th-minute winner from Viktor Claesson. Andersson's side lost in the Round of 16 following a 120th minute extra time-winner from Ukraine.

==== Setback since 2021 ====
The next era of Andersson's Sweden proved to be a failure as Sweden failed to qualify for the 2022 FIFA World Cup held in Qatar, after losing to Poland 2–0 away in the decisive playoff fixture. Sweden were also later relegated in the 2022–23 UEFA Nations League B to 2024–25 UEFA Nations League C after a poor showing, notably letting Slovenia to draw 1–1 at home that cost Sweden a place in League B. In UEFA Euro 2024 qualifying, Sweden even suffered greater setbacks after string of defeats to Belgium and Austria proved lethal for Sweden's dream to qualify for the tournament; after Austria beat Azerbaijan 1–0 in Baku, Sweden thus failed to qualify for the UEFA Euro 2024, for the first time since 1996 they would not make it. After this failure, Janne Andersson announced he would step down as coach of Sweden, which he did after the final match.

On 12 April 2025, Andersson announced his retirement from coaching.

== Accolades ==
In July 2016, Andersson was named the 47th best manager in the world by football magazine FourFourTwo. In November 2018, Andersson was named by FourFourTwo as the 17th best manager in the world.

At the 2019 Swedish Sports Awards, Andersson was named Coach of the Year.

== Personal life ==
One of his role models is former Swedish handball coach Bengt Johansson, who is from the same neighbourhood, Söndrum, in Halmstad. Johansson served as Andersson's physical education teacher in primary school.

== Managerial statistics ==
As of match played 19 November 2023

Managerial record by team and tenure
Team	From	To	Record							
Team	From	To	G	W	D	L	GF	GA	GD	Win %
Sweden	23 June 2016	19 November 2023	94	48	15	31	151	97	+54	51.06

== Honours ==
IFK Norrköping

- Allsvenskan: 2015

Individual

- Allsvenskan Coach of the year: 2015
- Idrottsgalan Coach of the year: 2019
