= Andreas Johansson (footballer, born 1982) =

Swedish footballer

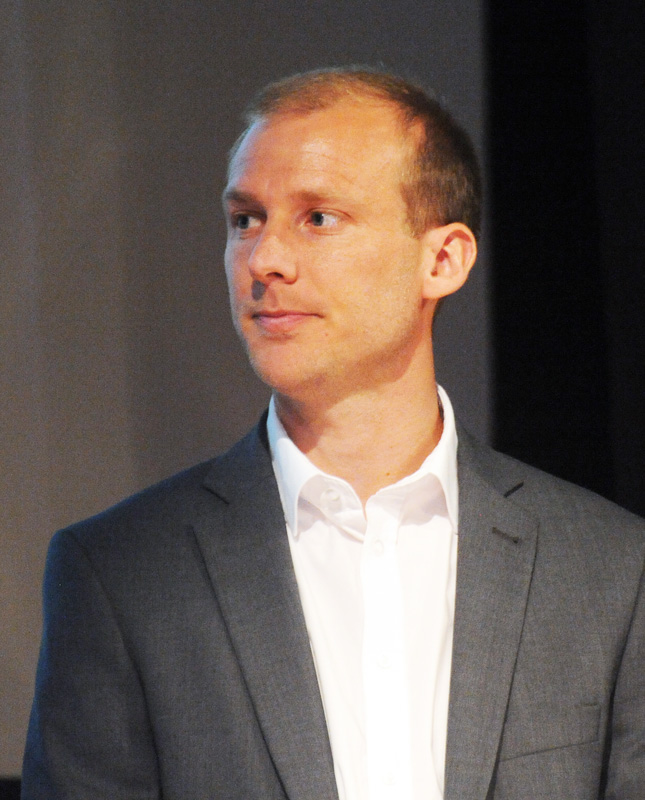

Personal information
- Full name: Karl Tommy Andreas Johansson
- Date of birth: 10 March 1982 (age 44)
- Place of birth: Halmstad, Sweden
- Height: 1.84 m (6 ft 0 in)
- Position: Centre back

Youth career
- 1987–1996: Getinge IF
- 1997–2002: Halmstads BK

Senior career*
Years	Team	Apps	(Gls)
2002–2009	Halmstads BK	174	(10)
2009–2012	VfL Bochum	51	(0)
2009–2010	VfL Bochum II	2	(1)
2012–2018	IFK Norrköping	205	(10)
2019–2024	Halmstads BK	164	(6)

International career
2003–2004	Sweden U21	12	(2)
2009	Sweden	1	(0)
- * Club domestic league appearances and goals as of 20 November 2024

Karl Tommy Andreas Johansson (born 10 March 1982), also known as Ante G, is a Swedish former footballer who last played as a centre back and midfielder for Halmstads BK.

== Club career ==
=== Halmstads BK ===
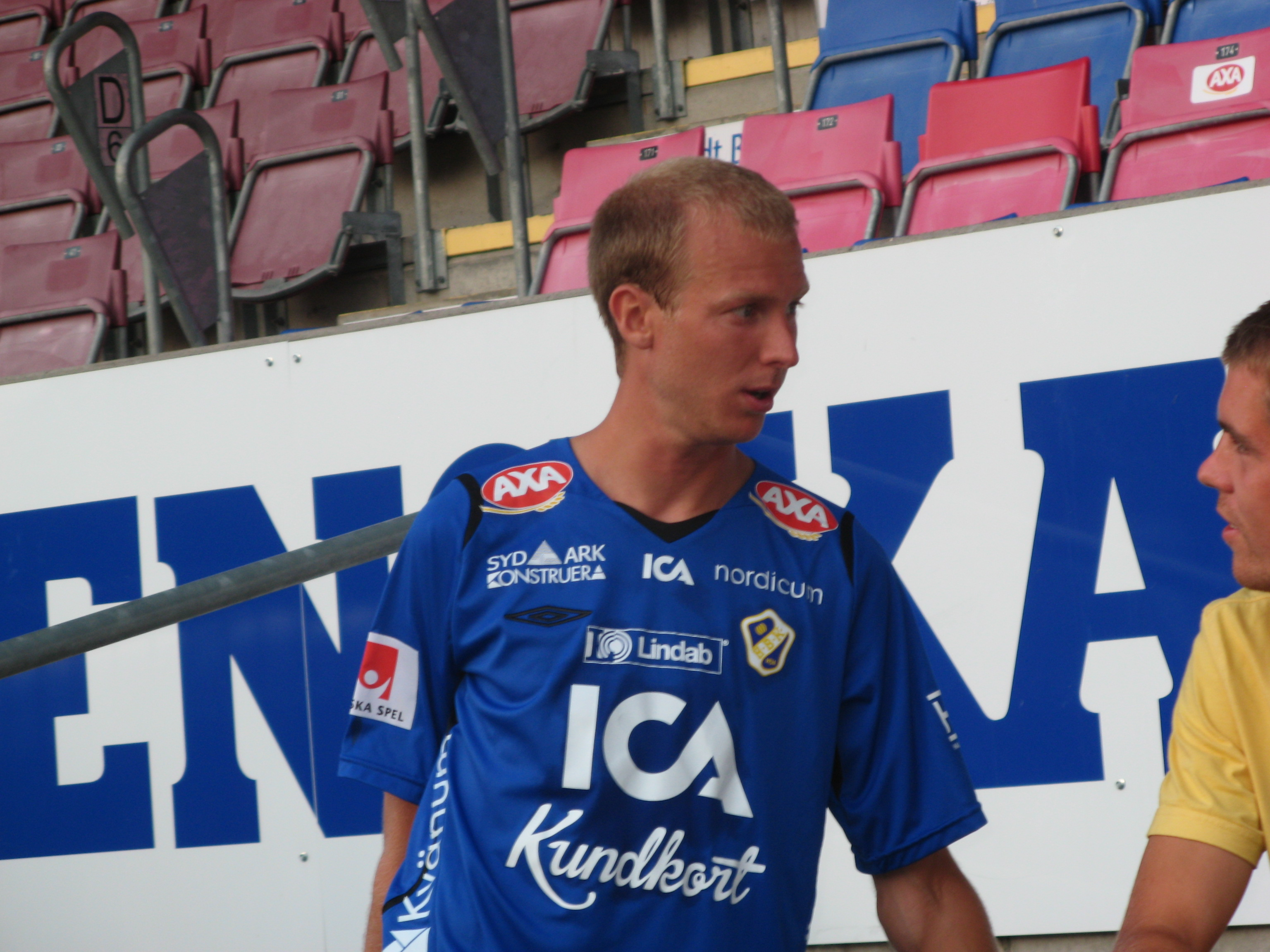
Johansson wearing the Halmstad BK shirt in 2008.

Johansson was born in Getinge (Halland) in the southwest of Sweden. He started to play football with five years at local side Getinge IF, but moved at the age of 15 to Halmstads BK. When he arrived at Halmstads BK there was another player in the club with the name Andreas Johansson, to separate the players they were each given a nickname based upon where they have come from, Andreas Johansson (born 1982) was called "Ante G" (Getinge), while the other Andreas Johansson was nicknamed "Ante V" (Vallås).

After four years in the reserve team he made his debut in 2002 against Örgryte IS and established himself quickly as a regular player in the team. In the coming years he played 165 matches for the club and scored nine goals. A second place in 2004 was the biggest success in this period.

=== VfL Bochum ===
On 22 June 2009, Johansson left Halmstads BK and signed a contract with Bundesliga club VfL Bochum for an undisclosed fee and on 1 July he joined the German club.

== International career ==
Playing several matches for the Swedish U-21 team, he made his debut for the Senior team on 29 January 2009 in a match against Mexico during Sweden's yearly friendly tournament in USA.

== Career statistics ==
As of 17 April 2024

Club	Season	League			Cup		European Cups		Other		Total	
Club	Season	Division	Apps	Goals	Apps	Goals	Apps	Goals	Apps	Goals	Apps	Goals
Halmstads BK	2002	Allsvenskan	16	1	0	0	0	0	—		16	1
Halmstads BK	2003	Allsvenskan	24	2	0	0	0	0	—		24	2
Halmstads BK	2004	Allsvenskan	15	0	0	0	0	0	—		15	0
Halmstads BK	2005	Allsvenskan	18	2	0	0	6	1	—		24	3
Halmstads BK	2006	Allsvenskan	25	0	3	0	0	0	—		28	0
Halmstads BK	2007	Allsvenskan	25	0	2	0	0	0	—		27	0
Halmstads BK	2008	Allsvenskan	30	1	3	1	0	0	—		33	2
Halmstads BK	2009	Allsvenskan	12	3	1	0	0	0	—		13	3
Halmstads BK	Total		165	9	9	1	6	1	0	0	180	11
VfL Bochum II	2009–10	Regionalliga West	2	1	—		—		—		2	1
VfL Bochum	2009–10	Bundesliga	16	0	0	0	0	0	—		16	0
VfL Bochum	2010–11	2. Bundesliga	26	0	0	0	0	0	2	0	26	0
VfL Bochum	2011–12	2. Bundesliga	9	0	1	0	—		—		10	0
VfL Bochum	Total		52	0	1	0	0	0	2	0	55	0
IFK Norrköping	2012	Allsvenskan	29	0	5	0	0	0	—		34	0
IFK Norrköping	2013	Allsvenskan	28	4	4	0	0	0	—		32	4
IFK Norrköping	2014	Allsvenskan	29	0	5	0	0	0	—		34	0
IFK Norrköping	2015	Allsvenskan	29	2	5	0	0	0	—		34	2
IFK Norrköping	2016	Allsvenskan	30	1	6	0	2	0	—		38	1
IFK Norrköping	2017	Allsvenskan	30	1	7	0	4	0	—		41	1
IFK Norrköping	2018	Allsvenskan	30	2	1	1	0	0	—		31	3
IFK Norrköping	Total		205	10	33	1	6	0	0	0	244	11
Halmstads BK	2018	Superettan	0	0	4	0	0	0	—		4	0
Halmstads BK	2019	Superettan	30	2	4	0	0	0	—		34	2
Halmstads BK	2020	Superettan	29	2	3	0	0	0	—		32	2
Halmstads BK	2021	Allsvenskan	30	1	4	0	0	0	—		34	1
Halmstads BK	2022	Superettan	30	2	4	0	0	0	—		34	2
Halmstads BK	2023	Allsvenskan	28	0	5	0	0	0	—		33	0
Halmstads BK	2024	Allsvenskan	3	0	0	0	0	0	—		3	0
Halmstads BK	Total		150	7	24	0	0	0	0	0	174	7
Career total			574	26	67	2	12	1	2	0	654	29
