= Magnus Bahne =

Finnish footballer (born 1979)

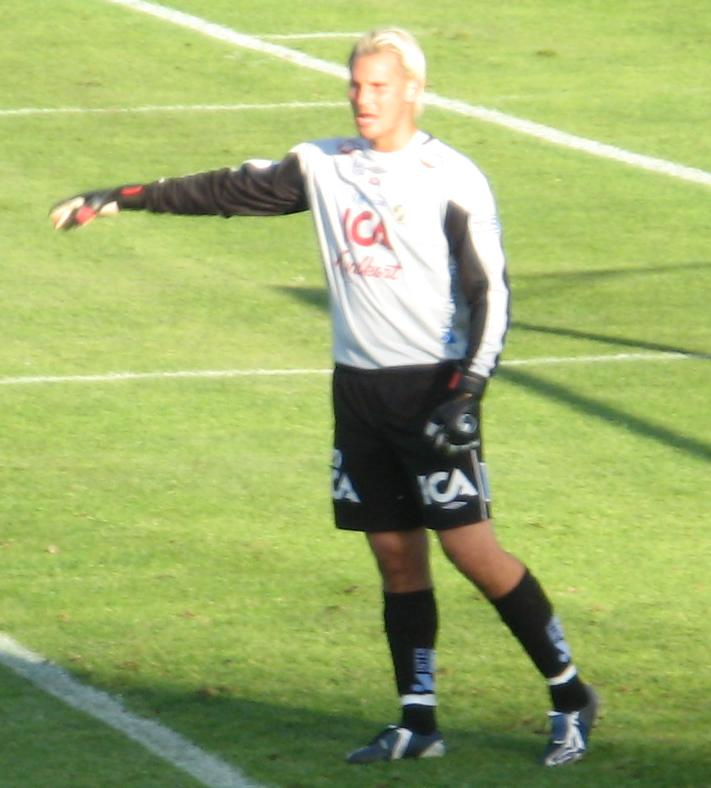
- Bahne in 2008

Personal information
- Date of birth: 15 March 1979 (age 47)
- Place of birth: Kaarina, Finland
- Height: 1.88 m (6 ft 2 in)
- Position: Goalkeeper

Youth career
- 1996–1997: Inter Turku

Senior career*
Years	Team	Apps	(Gls)
1998–2006	Inter Turku	197	(0)
2007–2009	Halmstads BK	65	(0)
2010	Assyriska FF	26	(0)
2011–2015	Inter Turku	129	(0)

International career
	Finland U21	7	(0)
2006	Finland	2	(0)
- * Club domestic league appearances and goals

Magnus Bahne (born 15 March 1979) is a Finnish former professional footballer who played as a goalkeeper.

== Club career ==
Bahne was born in Kaarina. He started his career in Inter Turku and at the age 20 he became the number one goalkeeper of the team. In 2007, he signed with Halmstads BK in the Swedish Allsvenskan.

He was on trial at Charlton in 2001, Fredrikstad FK in 2005 and IK Start in 2006.

When transferring in 2007 to Halmstads BK he immediately took the position as number one goalkeeper and one of the best goalkeepers in the league.

During the 2007 season, he injured himself against IFK Göteborg (3–1 loss) in August. It was later revealed that he had torn his ACL and would not be able to play until after Euro 2008. Even though he missed a large part of the 2007 season due to the injury he was voted goalkeeper of the year (best in Sweden) in the annual Fotbollsgala 2007. He made a successful comeback from the injury in the summer of 2008, playing 19 matches and gaining back the position has number one in Halmstad. In 2009, he played 27 matches in Allsvenskan.

On 1 September 2009, Bahne announced that he would not sign a new contract with Halmstads BK and that he would leave the club after the season, stating that he wanted to try to play in a bigger league.

On 30 January 2010, Assyriska FF confirmed that they have signed Bahne.

After only one season with Assyriska, Bahne signed a one-year contract with his former club Inter Turku on 8 November 2010.

== International career ==
Bahne was one of the candidates to take the place has number one goalkeeper in the Finland national team, after Jussi Jääskeläinen announced about his retirement from the national team and concentrating fully on Bolton Wanderers.

Bahne made two appearances for the senior national team and also played seven games for the Under-21 team.

== Personal life ==
Magnus has a brother by the name Martin Bahne who is, in Finland, a well-known actor, who in 2007 played the main role in the movie Raja 1918 (English: The border 1918).

== Honours ==
Individual

- Veikkausliiga Player of the Month: April 2012
