= 2004 in Swedish football =

The 2004 season in Swedish football, starting January 2004 and ending December 2004:

== Events ==
- 19 May 2004: Valencia wins the UEFA Cup final against Marseille which was played on Ullevi Stadium, Gothenburg.
- 22 June 2004: Sweden qualify for the quarterfinals of the Euro 2004 tournament in Portugal after beating Bulgaria 5–0, drawing Italy 1–1 and in the final group stage game, playing 2–2 against Denmark, a result which ensured both Scandinavian teams a place in the final stage.
- 26 June 2004: The Netherlands knocks Sweden out of the European Championships as they win the penalty shootout after 0–0 in both full-time and extra time.
- 23 September 2004: IF Elfsborg ends IFK Göteborg's winning streak of seven consecutive won games starting August 3.
- 4 October 2004: IFK Göteborg celebrates its 100th birthday with a 2–0 win against Djurgårdens IF.
- 18 October 2004: The game between AIK and Hammarby IF is interrupted (and not started again until after 55 minutes) as AIK fans causes trouble on their part of Råsunda.
- 24 October 2004: Örgryte IS wins 3–0 against AIK, which means that AIK will be relegated to Superettan. The match was played with empty terraces due to the behaviour of the AIK supporters the previous round.
- 30 October 2004: Malmö FF wins their 15th title after passing Halmstads BK in the last round of Allsvenskan as they beat IF Elfsborg 1–0 while Halmstad, that would have taken the gold with a win, only managed to play 1–1 against IFK Göteborg.
- 8 November 2004: The licensing committee of the Swedish Football Association denies Örebro SK the licence needed (called Elitlicensen) to play in Allsvenskan due to the club's bad economy. Örebro SK immediately appeals against the decision.
- 11 November 2004: The first round of the first edition of Royal League is played. The four top teams from Sweden, Norway and Denmark compete to win the title Scandinavian Champions.
- 3 December 2004: Örebro SK's appeal is denied, and they will play in Superettan the 2005 season.

== Honours ==
=== Official titles ===
Title	Team	Reason
Swedish Champions 2004	Malmö FF	Winners of Allsvenskan
Swedish Cup Champions 2004	Djurgårdens IF	Winners of Svenska Cupen

=== Competitions ===
Level	Competition	Team
1st level	Allsvenskan 2004	Malmö FF
2nd level	Superettan 2004	BK Häcken
Cup	Svenska Cupen 2004	Djurgårdens IF

== Promotions, relegations and qualifications ==
=== Promotions ===
Promoted from	Promoted to	Team	Reason
Superettan 2004	Allsvenskan 2005	BK Häcken	Winners
Superettan 2004	Allsvenskan 2005	Gefle IF	2nd team
Superettan 2004	Allsvenskan 2005	Assyriska Föreningen	3rd team
Division 2 2004	Superettan 2005	Degerfors IF	Winners of promotion play-off
Division 2 2004	Superettan 2005	Ljungskile SK	Winners of promotion play-off
Division 2 2004	Superettan 2005	Mjällby AIF	Winners of promotion play-off

=== Relegations ===
Relegated from	Relegated to	Team	Reason
Allsvenskan 2004	Superettan 2005	Örebro SK	Denied license
Allsvenskan 2004	Superettan 2005	AIK	13th team
Allsvenskan 2004	Superettan 2005	Trelleborgs FF	14th team
Superettan 2004	Division 2 2005	Enköpings SK	14th team
Superettan 2004	Division 2 2005	IK Brage	15th team
Superettan 2004	Division 2 2005	Friska Viljor FC	16th team

=== International qualifications ===
Qualified for	Enters	Team	Reason
UEFA Champions League 2005–06	2nd qualifying round	Malmö FF	Winners of Allsvenskan
UEFA Cup 2005–06	2nd qualifying round	Halmstads BK	2nd team in Allsvenskan
UEFA Cup 2005–06	2nd qualifying round	Djurgårdens IF	Winners of Svenska Cupen
UEFA Intertoto Cup 2005	1st round	IFK Göteborg	3rd team in Allsvenskan
Royal League 2004–05	Group stage	Malmö FF	Winners of Allsvenskan
Royal League 2004–05	Group stage	Halmstads BK	2nd team in Allsvenskan
Royal League 2004–05	Group stage	IFK Göteborg	3rd team in Allsvenskan
Royal League 2004–05	Group stage	Djurgårdens IF	4th team in Allsvenskan

== Domestic results ==
=== Allsvenskan ===
Pos	Team	Pld	W	D	L	GF	GA	GD	Pts	Qualification or relegation
1	Malmö FF (C)	26	15	7	4	44	21	+23	52	Qualification to Champions League second qualifying round
2	Halmstads BK	26	14	8	4	53	27	+26	50	Qualification to UEFA Cup second qualifying round
3	IFK Göteborg	26	14	5	7	33	20	+13	47	Qualification to Intertoto Cup first round
4	Djurgårdens IF	26	11	8	7	38	32	+6	41	Qualification to UEFA Cup second qualifying round (Note: Djurgården qualified for the UEFA Cup as Svenska Cupen champions 2004.)
5	Kalmar FF	26	10	10	6	27	18	+9	40	
6	Hammarby IF	26	10	7	9	28	28	0	37	
7	GIF Sundsvall	26	9	7	10	30	29	+1	34	
8	Örebro SK (R)	26	9	6	11	32	45	−13	33	Relegation to Superettan (Note: After the 2004 season, The Swedish FA licensing committee denied Örebro the licence needed to play in Allsvenskan the next season due to the club's economic situation and they were thus relegated to Superettan 2005. Assyriska Föreningen were promoted in place of Örebro.)
9	IF Elfsborg	26	8	8	10	25	32	−7	32	
10	Helsingborgs IF	26	7	9	10	41	33	+8	30	
11	Landskrona BoIS	26	7	9	10	27	33	−6	30	
12	Örgryte IS (O)	26	6	9	11	24	35	−11	27	Qualification to Relegation play-offs
13	AIK (R)	26	5	10	11	23	35	−12	25	Relegation to Superettan
14	Trelleborgs FF (R)	26	2	7	17	18	55	−37	13	Relegation to Superettan

Source: svenskfotboll.se (in Swedish)
Rules for classification: 1) points; 2) goal difference; 3) number of goals scored.
(C) Champions; (O) Play-off winners; (R) Relegated

=== 2004 Allsvenskan qualification play-off ===
November 3, 2004

Assyriska Föreningen	2–1	Örgryte IS

Bårsta IP, Södertälje
November 7, 2004

Örgryte IS	(ag) 1–0	Assyriska Föreningen

Gamla Ullevi, Gothenburg

=== Superettan ===
Pos	Team	Pld	W	D	L	GF	GA	GD	Pts	Promotion, qualification or relegation
1	BK Häcken (C, P)	30	19	8	3	60	31	+29	65	Promotion to Allsvenskan
2	Gefle IF (P)	30	17	7	6	50	28	+22	58	Promotion to Allsvenskan
3	Assyriska FF (P)	30	17	3	10	48	39	+9	54	Qualification to Promotion playoffs (Note: Assyriska FF lost the promotion play-offs against Örgryte but were promoted nonetheless since Örebro were relegated due to their Allsvenskan licence being revoked for financial reasons.)
4	IFK Norrköping	30	14	8	8	58	37	+21	50	
5	Östers IF	30	14	8	8	51	36	+15	50	
6	GAIS	30	13	10	7	45	40	+5	49	
7	Åtvidabergs FF	30	14	6	10	55	47	+8	48	
8	Västerås SK	30	12	8	10	47	47	0	44	
9	Café Opera United	30	10	10	10	45	39	+6	40	
10	IF Brommapojkarna	30	9	9	12	43	42	+1	36	
11	Västra Frölunda	30	10	6	14	40	48	−8	36	
12	Falkenbergs FF	30	8	5	17	30	52	−22	29	
13	Boden	30	5	13	12	32	40	−8	28	
14	Enköpings SK (R)	30	5	11	14	31	44	−13	26	Relegation to Division 2
15	IK Brage (R)	30	5	10	15	41	62	−21	25	Relegation to Division 2
16	Friska Viljor (R)	30	6	2	22	30	74	−44	20	Relegation to Division 2

Source: svenskfotboll.se (in Swedish)
Rules for classification: 1) points; 2) goal difference; 3) number of goals scored.
(C) Champions; (P) Promoted; (R) Relegated

=== 2004 Svenska Cupen ===
Quarter-finals

July 29, 2004

IFK Göteborg	3–2	Örebro SK

Gamla Ullevi, Gothenburg

August 5, 2004

GAIS	0–1	Hammarby IF

Gamla Ullevi, Gothenburg

September 23, 2004

Östers IF	2–0	Assyriska Föreningen

Värendsvallen, Växjö

October 14, 2004

IFK Norrköping	0–1	Djurgårdens IF

Idrottsparken, Norrköping

Semi-finals

October 20, 2004

Östers IF	0–2	Djurgårdens IF

Värendsvallen, Växjö

October 21, 2004

Hammarby IF	0–2	IFK Göteborg

Söderstadion, Stockholm

Final

November 6, 2004

Djurgårdens IF	3–1	IFK Göteborg

Råsunda, Solna
