= 2012 Halmstads BK season =

Halmstads BK
2012 season
- Chairman: (Sweden) Göran Johansson
- Manager: (Sweden) Jens Gustafsson
- Superettan: 3rd
- Svenska Cupen: Group stage
- Top goalscorer: League: Guðjón Baldvinsson (15); All: Guðjón Baldvinsson (15)
- Highest home attendance: 7 202 vs Falkenbergs FF (25 June)
- Lowest home attendance: 2 109 vs Trelleborgs FF (30 April)

In 2012 Halmstads BK will compete in Superettan and Svenska Cupen.

== 2012 season squad ==
Statistics prior to season start only

Squad Season 2012
No.	Player	Nat.	Birthdate	In Halmstads BK since	Previous club	Caps for Halmstads BK (Note: Both league and cup included)	Goals for Halmstads BK
Goalkeepers
1	Karl-Johan Johnsson	(Sweden)	28 January 1990 (age 36)	2009	Youth Team	42	0
22	Rasmus Rydén	(Sweden)	23 March 1983 (age 42)	2012	Östers IF	0	0
27	Malkolm Nilsson	(Sweden)	3 August 1993 (age 32)	2010	BK Astrio	0	0
Defenders
2	Viktor Ljung	(Sweden)	19 April 1991 (age 34)	2010	Youth Team	13	0
3	Johnny Lundberg	(Sweden)	15 April 1982 (age 43)	2009	FC Nordsjælland	42	3
4	Ryan Miller	(United States)	14 December 1984 (age 41)	2010	Ljungskile SK	46	0
12	Simon Klang	(Sweden)	29 October 1992 (age 33)	2002	Sennans IF	0	0
16	Christian Järdler	(Sweden)	3 June 1982 (age 43)	2009	Malmö FF	54	0
20	Michael Svensson	(Sweden)	25 November 1975 (age 50)	2011	Free transfer	90 (Note: Matches from earlier spell with the club included)	5
21	Anton Tideman	(Sweden)	2 September 1992 (age 33)	2011	Laholms FK	0	0
25	Richard Magyar	(Sweden)	3 May 1991 (age 34)	2010	Youth Team	25	2
Midfielders
5	Peter Nyström	(Sweden)	27 August 1984 (age 41)	2012	BK Häcken	0	0
6	Johan Blomberg	(Sweden)	14 June 1987 (age 38)	2012	Ängelholms FF	0	0
7	Kristinn Steindórsson	(Iceland)	29 April 1990 (age 35)	2012	Breiðablik UBK	0	0
8	Kristoffer Fagercrantz	(Sweden)	9 October 1986 (age 39)	2012	Kalmar FF	5	0
10	Antonio Rojas	(Paraguay)	27 March 1984 (age 41)	2012	Ängelholms FF	0	0
13	Kristoffer Thydell	(Sweden)	17 March 1993 (age 32)	2010	Youth Team	16	0
15	Anton Jonsson	(Sweden)	31 January 1993 (age 33)	2008	Alets IK	16	0
17	Oliver Silverholt	(Sweden)	22 June 1994 (age 31)	2010	BK Astrio	0	0
24	Ardian Rexhepi	(Sweden)	16 August 1993 (age 32)	2011	Youth Team	7	0
26	Joakim Wrele	(Sweden)	7 January 1991 (age 35)	2010	Youth Team	3	0
Forwards
9	Guðjón Baldvinsson	(Iceland)	15 February 1986 (age 40)	2012	KR Reykjavíkur	0	0
14	Mikael Boman	(Sweden)	14 July 1988 (age 37)	2012	Falkenbergs FF	0	0
19	Liridon Selmani	(Sweden)	12 June 1992 (age 33)	2011	Hyltebruks IF	3	0
23	Marcus Antonsson	(Sweden)	8 May 1991 (age 34)	2011	Youth Team	7	0
Players departed during the season
8	Jónas Sævarsson	(Iceland)	28 November 1983 (age 42)	2009	KR Reykjavík	54	5
Last updated: 17 April 2012

== Transfers ==
=== In ===
No.	Pos.	Nat.	Name	Age	EU	Moving from	Type	Transfer window	Ends	Transfer fee	Source
	FW	(Sweden)	Boman	23	EU	Falkenbergs FF	Transfer	Winter		N/A	Halmstads BK
	MF	(Sweden)	Nyström	27	EU	BK Häcken	Transfer	Winter		N/A	Halmstads BK
	MF	(Paraguay)	Rojas	27	Non-EU	Ängelholms FF	Transfer	Winter		N/A	Halmstads BK
	MF	(Sweden)	Blomberg	24	EU	Ängelholms FF	Transfer	Winter		N/A	Halmstads BK
	FW	(Iceland)	Baldvinsson	25	EU	KR (Iceland)	Transfer	Winter		N/A	Halmstads BK
	MF	(Iceland)	Steindórsson	21	EU	Breiðablik (Iceland)	Transfer	Winter		N/A	Halmstads BK
	GK	(Sweden)	Rydén	28	EU	Östers IF	Transfer	Winter		N/A	Halmstads BK
	MF	(Sweden)	Fagercrantz	25	EU	Kalmar FF	Loan	Summer		N/A	Halmstads BK

=== Out ===
No.	Pos.	Nat.	Name	Age	EU	Moving to	Type	Transfer window	Transfer fee	Source
	FW	(Sweden)	Johansson	25	EU	IF Elfsborg	Loan ended	Winter		Halmstads BK
	FW	(Sweden)	Sise	21	EU		Contract ended	Winter	free	Hallandsposten
	MF	(Kosovo)	Bala	21	EU	Varbergs BoIS	Contract ended	Winter	free	Varberg BoIS
	DF	(Lithuania)	Žvirgždauskas	36	EU		Contract ended	Winter	free	Hallandsposten
	DF	(Sweden)	Gustafson	24	EU		Contract ended	Winter	free	Hallandsposten
	MF	(Germany)	Görlitz	24	EU		Contract ended	Winter	free	Hallandsposten
	DF	(Sweden)	Rosén	37	EU		Contract ended	Winter	free	Halmstads BK
	GK	(Sweden)	Åkesson	33	EU	IFK Värnamo	Transfer	Winter	free	fotbolltransfers.com
	GK	(Sweden)	Malmqvist	24	EU	Assyriska Föreningen	Transfer	Winter	free	Halmstads BK
	MF	(Kosovo)	Raskaj	22	EU		Contract ended	Winter	free	Halmstads BK
	MF	(Sweden)	Olsson	23	EU		Contract ended	Winter	free	Halmstads BK
	GK	(Sweden)	Kristiansson	20	EU		Contract ended	Winter	free	Halmstads BK
	MF	(Iceland)	Sævarsson	28	EU	KR (Iceland)	Contract terminated	Summer	free	Halmstads BK

Last updated: 27 January 2012

== Appearances and goals ==
As of 18 December 2012

No.	Pos	Nat	Player	Total		Superettan		Svenska Cupen		Other	
No.	Pos	Nat	Player	Apps	Goals	Apps	Goals	Apps	Goals	Apps	Goals
1	GK	(Sweden) SWE	Karl-Johan Johnsson	40	0	30	0	0	0	10	0
2	DF	(Sweden) SWE	Viktor Ljung	21	0	15	0	1	0	5	0
3	DF	(Sweden) SWE	Johnny Lundberg	38	3	28	3	0	0	10	0
4	DF	(United States) USA	Ryan Miller	42	0	30	0	1	0	11	0
5	MF	(Sweden) SWE	Peter Nyström	36	2	23	2	1	0	12	0
6	MF	(Sweden) SWE	Johan Blomberg	41	3	29	2	1	0	11	1
7	MF	(Iceland) ISL	Kristinn Steindórsson	37	10	29	7	1	1	7	2
8	MF	(Sweden) SWE	Kristoffer Fagercrantz	11	3	11	3	0	0	0	0
9	FW	(Iceland) ISL	Guðjón Baldvinsson	41	22	29	16	0	0	12	6
10	MF	(Paraguay) PAR	Antonio Rojas	37	11	27	9	0	0	10	2
12	DF	(Sweden) SWE	Simon Klang	3	0	0	0	0	0	3	0
13	MF	(Sweden) SWE	Kristoffer Thydell	28	0	20	0	1	0	7	0
14	FW	(Sweden) SWE	Mikael Boman	43	19	30	13	1	2	12	4
15	MF	(Sweden) SWE	Anton Jonsson	1	0	0	0	0	0	1	0
16	DF	(Sweden) SWE	Christian Järdler	37	2	26	1	1	0	10	1
17	DF	(Sweden) SWE	Oliver Silverholt	14	0	8	0	0	0	6	0
19	FW	(Sweden) SWE	Liridon Selmani	7	0	1	0	1	0	5	0
20	DF	(Sweden) SWE	Michael Svensson	11	0	8	0	1	0	2	0
21	DF	(Sweden) SWE	Anton Tideman	3	0	0	0	0	0	3	0
22	GK	(Sweden) SWE	Rasmus Rydén	5	0	0	0	1	0	4	0
23	FW	(Sweden) SWE	Marcus Antonsson	23	2	18	1	1	1	4	0
24	MF	(Sweden) SWE	Ardian Rexhepi	8	2	0	0	0	0	8	2
25	DF	(Sweden) SWE	Richard Magyar	41	5	27	4	1	0	13	1
26	MF	(Sweden) SWE	Joakim Wrele	27	1	14	0	1	1	12	0
27	GK	(Sweden) SWE	Malkolm Nilsson	0	0	0	0	0	0	0	0
	DF	(Sweden) SWE	Sebastian Möller	1	0	0	0	0	0	1	0
Players who have departed the club after the start of the season:
	MF	(Sweden) SWE	Joakim Blomquist (Note: On trial from IK Frej)	1	0	0	0	0	0	1	0
	FW	(Sweden) SWE	Joel Johansson	1	0	0	0	0	0	1	0
8	MF	(Iceland) ISL	Jónas Sævarsson	10	0	2	0	0	0	8	0

== Matches ==
=== Pre-season/friendlies ===
24 November 2011 Match 1	Malmö FF B	2–0	Halmstads BK	Malmö IP, Malmö
13:00 CET	Mustafa 35'; Ali 40'	(report) (in Swedish)	(yellow card) 30' Thydell; (yellow card) 49' Selmani; (yellow card) 65' Sævarsson	Attendance: 300; Referee: Daniel Böcker

28 January 2012 Match 2	(Denmark) Nordsjælland	3–2	Halmstads BK	Værløse Stadion, Værløse
13:00 CET	Christensen 8'; Lawan 10'; Kildentoft 12'	(report) (in Swedish)	(yellow card) Ljung; 24' Baldvinsson; 72' (pen.) Steindórsson	Attendance: 100; Referee: Kenn Hansen

4 February 2012 Match 3	Halmstads BK	4–2	Lunds BK	Halmstad Arena, Halmstad
13:00 CET	Steindórsson 3'; Baldvinsson 7', 41'; Rexhepi 31'; Järdler (yellow card); Thydell (yellow card)	(report) (in Swedish)	51' Mustafa; 69' Amiri	Attendance: 210

7 February 2012 Match 4	BK Häcken	1–0	Halmstads BK	Valhalla IP, Gothenburg
17:00 CET	Williams 61'	(report) (in Swedish)		Attendance: 100

11 February 2012 Match 5	Halmstads BK	1–2	Jönköpings Södra	Halmstad Arena, Halmstad
13:00 CET	Magyar (red card) 55'; Boman 81'	(report) (in Swedish)	42' Cederqvist; 48' Smylie	Attendance: 245

18 February 2012 Match 6	Ängelholms FF	1–2	Halmstads BK	Valhall Park, Ängelholm
14:00 CET	Simovic 78' (pen.)	(report) (in Swedish)	60' Boman; 90' Baldvinsson	Attendance: N/A; Referee: N/A

22 February 2012 Match 7	Östers IF	3–0	Halmstads BK	Tipshallen, Växjö
17:30 CET	Birgersson 13', 21'; Persson 47'	(report) (in Swedish)	(yellow card) Ljung	Attendance: 779; Referee: N/A

25 February 2012 Match 8	Halmstads BK	2–0	Trelleborgs FF	Sannarps IP, Halmstad
13:00 CET	Järdler 6'; Baldvinsson 28'	(report) (in Swedish)		Attendance: 288; Referee: N/A

3 March 2012 Match 9	Halmstads BK	2–0	Kristianstads FF	Sannarps IP, Halmstad
13:00 CET	Boman 57'; Blomberg 68'; Järdler (yellow card); Nyström (yellow card)	(report) (in Swedish)	(red card) N/A	Attendance: 283; Referee: Robert Daradic

8 March 2012 Match 10	Halmstads BK	1–0	IFK Värnamo	Sannarps IP, Halmstad
17:00 CET	Magyar 8'	(report) (in Swedish)		Attendance: 150; Referee: N/A

20 March 2012 Match 11	IF Elfsborg	3–1	Halmstads BK	Borås Arena, Borås
18:00 CET	Ishizaki 72' (pen.); Larsson 76'; Hult 90+'	(report) (in Swedish)	42' Boman	Attendance: N/A; Referee: N/A

26 March 2012 Match 12	Halmstads BK	2–3	Kalmar FF	Alevallen, Halmstad
14:00 CEST	Rojas 27', 75'; Järdler (yellow card)	(report) (in Swedish)	66' (pen.) Fagercrantz; 72' Arajuuri; 77' Dauda	Attendance: 530; Referee: Martin Olsson

11 July 2012 Match 13	Halmstads BK	1–2	FC Dynamo Moscow (Russia)	Örjans Vall, Halmstad
20:00 CEST	Rexhepi 75'; Nyström (yellow card); Selmani (yellow card)	(report) (in Swedish)	13' Solovyev; 76' Semshov	Attendance: 714; Referee: Anti Kanerva

=== Superettan ===
9 April 2012 Match 1	Hammarby IF	1–0	Halmstads BK	Söderstadion, Stockholm
17:20 CEST	Lallet (yellow card) 10'; Bojassén 21'; Ayranci (yellow card) 75'	(report) (in Swedish)	(yellow card) 20' Miller; (yellow card) 66' Blomberg; (yellow card) 80' Järdler	Attendance: 11 959; Referee: Kristoffer Karlsson

14 April 2012 Match 2	Halmstads BK	2–0	Degerfors IF	Örjans Vall, Halmstad
14:00 CEST	Baldvinsson 5', 63'; Nyström (yellow card) 75'	(report) (in Swedish)	(yellow card) 75' Klingberg; (yellow card) 66' Andronic	Attendance: 3 836; Referee: Lars Olsson

20 April 2012 Match 3	Ljungskile SK	0–0	Halmstads BK	Starke Arvid Arena, Ljungskile
19:20 CEST	Kitić (yellow card) 76'	(report) (in Swedish)	(yellow card) 64' Thydell	Attendance: 482; Referee: Nermin Cisic

30 April 2012 Match 4	Halmstads BK	3–1	Trelleborgs FF	Örjans Vall, Halmstad
19:20 CEST	Lundberg 24' (yellow card) 61'; Nyström (yellow card) 30'; Boman 51'; Baldvinsson 71'; Steindórsson (yellow card) 89'	(report) (in Swedish)	(yellow card) 17' Jovanović; (yellow card) 58' Andersson; 61' Haynes; (yellow card) 64' Turunen	Attendance: 2 109; Referee: Antti Kanerva

7 May 2012 Match 5	Östers IF	2–1	Halmstads BK	Värendsvallen, Växjö
19:00 CEST	Söderberg 11'; Nurkić (yellow card) 35'; Lindblad (yellow card) 58'; Wihlborg 61'	(report) (in Swedish)	24' Steindórsson; (yellow card) 81' Wrele	Attendance: 4 793; Referee: Jim Petersson

12 May 2012 Match 6	Halmstads BK	3–2	Jönköpings Södra IF	Örjans Vall, Halmstad
18:00 CEST	Steindórsson 8'; Thydell (yellow card) 15'; Baldvinsson 22'; Boman 47'; Blomberg (yellow card) 50'; Johnsson (yellow card) 81'	(report) (in Swedish)	40', 87' Hrgota; (yellow card) 52' Drott; (yellow card) 68' K. Svensson	Attendance: 2 155; Referee: Magnus Ahlsén

12 May 2012 Match 7	Halmstads BK	0–0	Ängelholms FF	Örjans Vall, Halmstad
18:00 CEST	Lundberg (yellow card) 31'; Järdler (yellow card) 72'	(report) (in Swedish)	(yellow card) 64' Lindberg; (yellow card) 72' Staaf	Attendance: 2 646; Referee: Kristoffer Karlsson

20 May 2012 Match 8	Umeå FC	0–4	Halmstads BK	Gammliavallen, Umeå
18:00 CEST		(report) (in Swedish)	12' Boman; 37' (yellow card) 56' Baldvinsson; (yellow card) 61' Thydell; 76' Magyar; 87' Antonsson	Attendance: 1 025; Referee: Dragan Banjac

24 May 2012 Match 9	Halmstads BK	2–0	IF Brommapojkarna	Örjans Vall, Halmstad
19:20 CEST	Baldvinsson 40'; Boman 76'	(report) (in Swedish)	(yellow card) 40' Augustinsson; (yellow card) 45+1' Petrović; (yellow card) 45+1' Bahoui	Attendance: 2 303; Referee: Mattias Nyman

17 July 2012 (Note: Match moved from 1 June to 17 July due to international call up (in Swedish)) Match 10	IK Brage	2–1	Halmstads BK	Domnarvsvallen, Borlänge
19:00 CEST	Toompuu 29'; Kapčević 84' (pen.); Magyar (yellow card) 90+1'	(report) (in Swedish)	(yellow card) 33' (goal) 47' (pen.) Rojas; (yellow card) 84' Järdler	Attendance: 1 782; Referee: Niklas Abrahamsson

9 June 2012 Match 11	Halmstads BK	3–1	Varbergs BoIS FC	Örjans Vall, Halmstad
16:00 CEST	Baldvinsson 11'; Boman 20'; Magyar (yellow card) 58'; Rojas 77' (pen.) (yellow card) 79'; Järdler (yellow card) 90+4'	(report) (in Swedish)	9' Larsson; (yellow card) 66' Lindberg; (yellow card) 77' Dahlberg	Attendance: 5 279; Referee: Lars Olsson

16 June 2012 Match 12	IFK Värnamo	2–5	Halmstads BK	Finnvedsvallen, Värnamo
16:00 CEST	Kozica 11'; Ericson 20'	(report) (in Swedish)	2', 12', 63' (yellow card) 90+1' Baldvinsson; 52' Blomberg; 90+2' Boman	Attendance: 1 675; Referee: Jim Petersson

21 June 2012 Match 13	Halmstads BK	3–1	Assyriska Föreningen	Örjans Vall, Halmstad
16:30 CEST	Baldvinsson 19'; Steindórsson 41', 54'	(report) (in Swedish)	(yellow card) 33' Malmqvist; 39' (yellow card) 79' Thorstensson; (yellow card) 88' Durmaz	Attendance: 2 481; Referee: Dragan Banjac

25 June 2012 Match 14	Landskrona BoIS	3–3	Halmstads BK	Landskrona IP, Landskrona
19:00 CEST	Mijaljević 25', 45'; Steindórsson (yellow card) 56'; Hofsö (yellow card) 69' (goal) 70'; Malmqvist (yellow card) 90'	(report) (in Swedish)	(yellow card) 16' Järdler; 21' Magyar; 41' Rojas; 68' Lundberg; (yellow card) 90+2' Baldvinsson	Attendance: 2 413; Referee: Antti Kanerva

25 June 2012 Match 15	Halmstads BK	1–1	Falkenbergs FF	Örjans Vall, Halmstad
19:00 CEST	Nyström 30'; Lundberg (yellow card) 42'; Rojas (yellow card) 59'	(report) (in Swedish)	(yellow card) 45' (goal) 89' Rodevåg; (yellow card) 54' Sköld; (yellow card) 90+6' Wede	Attendance: 7 202; Referee: Jim Petersson

25 June 2012 Match 16	Falkenbergs FF	3–1	Halmstads BK	Falkenbergs IP, Falkenberg
20:00 CEST	Svensson (yellow card) 21'; Karlsson 72'; Svahn 76'; Översjö 80'	(report) (in Swedish)	(yellow card) 31' Järdler; 55' Nyström; (yellow card) 90' Lundberg	Attendance: 5 288; Referee: Kristoffer Karlsson

29 June 2012 Match 17	Halmstads BK	2–0	Hammarby IF	Örjans Vall, Halmstad
17:20 CEST	Lundberg (yellow card) 20'; Magyar 67'; Baldvinsson 90'	(report) (in Swedish)	(yellow card) 10' Törnstrand; (yellow card) 67' von Schlebrügge	Attendance: 6 649; Referee: Magnus Ahlsén

4 August 2012 Match 18	Degerfors IF	2–2	Halmstads BK	Stora Valla, Degerfors
16:00 CEST	Brandeborn 3', 11' (yellow card) 15'; Solberg (yellow card) 72'	(report) (in Swedish)	(yellow card) 42' Ljung; 56' (yellow card) 59' Blomberg; (yellow card) 83' Boman	Attendance: 2 281; Referee: Magnus Ahlsén

10 August 2012 Match 19	Ängelholms FF	0–2	Halmstads BK	Ängelholms IP, Ängelholm
18:45 CEST		(report) (in Swedish)	16' Boman; (yellow card) 38' Steindórsson; 51' (yellow card) 90' Fagercrantz	Attendance: 1 203; Referee: Per Melin

22 August 2012 Match 20	Halmstads BK	3–0	Umeå FC	Örjans Vall, Halmstad
19:00 CEST	Steindórsson 40'; Baldvinsson 43'; Rojas 61'	(report) (in Swedish)	(yellow card) 14' Mihajlović; (yellow card) 44' Bohman; (yellow card) 89' Kallay	Attendance: 2 254; Referee: Kasper Madsen

27 August 2012 Match 21	IF Brommapojkarna	0–3	Halmstads BK	Grimsta IP, Stockholm
19:20 CEST	A. Magnusson (yellow card) 35'; Eriksson (yellow card) 65'	(report) (in Swedish)	13' Baldvinsson; 22' Rojas; (yellow card) 39' Lundberg; 90' Steindórsson	Attendance: 1 486; Referee: Jim Petersson

31 August 2012 Match 22	Halmstads BK	4–0	IK Brage	Örjans Vall, Halmstad
19:20 CEST	Fagercrantz 25', 30'; Magyar (yellow card) 31'; Steindórsson 40'; Rojas 61'	(report) (in Swedish)	(yellow card) 27' Kapčević	Attendance: 2 478; Referee: Nermin Cisic

17 September 2012 Match 23	Halmstads BK	1–0	Ljungskile SK	Örjans Vall, Halmstad
19:20 CEST	Magyar 19'	(report) (in Swedish)		Attendance: 2 613; Referee: Mohammed Al Hakim

24 September 2012 Match 24	Trelleborgs FF	1–2	Halmstads BK	Vångavallen, Trelleborg
19:20 CEST	Fakhro (yellow card) 38'; Andersson (yellow card) 77'; Grahm 84'	(report) (in Swedish)	62' Boman; 63' Baldvinsson; (yellow card) 66' Fagercrantz; (yellow card) 67' Järdler	Attendance: 1 048; Referee: Kristoffer Karlsson

27 September 2012 Match 25	Halmstads BK	3–2	Östers IF	Örjans Vall, Halmstad
19:20 CEST	Järdler 45+2' (yellow card) 59'; Rojas 48', 51' (pen.) (yellow card) 83'; Blomberg (yellow card) 52'	(report) (in Swedish)	5' (yellow card) 45+2' Velić; 42' Henningsson; (red card) 51' Karlsson	Attendance: 3 761; Referee: Jim Petersson

1 October 2012 Match 26	Jönköpings Södra IF	1–1	Halmstads BK	Stadsparksvallen, Jönköping
19:00 CEST	Siwe 44'; Svensson (yellow card) 84'	(report) (in Swedish)	(red card) 66' Rojas; (yellow card) 69' Baldvinsson; 79' Boman	Attendance: 2 381; Referee: Antti Kanerva

8 October 2012 Match 27	Varbergs BoIS FC	2–2	Halmstads BK	Påskbergsvallen, Varberg
19:20 CEST	Larsson 30'; Björk (yellow card) 55' (yellow-red card) 83'; Tillman 87'	(report) (in Swedish)	(yellow card) 28' Magyar; (yellow card) 50' Järdler; 53'Boman; 70' Fagercrantz	Attendance: 2 733; Referee: Kristoffer Karlsson

21 October 2012 Match 28	Halmstads BK	2 – 3	IFK Värnamo	Örjans Vall, Halmstad
16:00 CEST	Mikael Boman 52'; Kristinn Steindórsson (yellow card) 54'; Lundberg 65'	(report) (in Swedish)	Zlojutro 87' (pen.); Lundberg 90' (o.g.); Dzenis Kozica 90+1' (yellow card) 90+1'	Attendance: 3 407; Referee: Dragan Banjac

29 October 2012 Match 29	Assyriska	2 – 1	Halmstads BK	Södertälje Fotbollsarena, Södertälje
19:20 CET	Eriş 13'; Nahir Besara 90' (yellow card) 90+1'; Sotirios Papagiannopoulos (yellow card) 90+2'	(report) (in Swedish)	Boman 61'	Attendance: 1,463; Referee: Lars Olsson

3 November 2012 Match 30	Halmstads BK	1–1	Landskrona BoIS	Örjans Vall, Halmstad
15:00 CET	Baldvinsson 32'	(report) (in Swedish)	(yellow card) 30' (yellow-red card) 90+2' P. Andersson; 32' Liverstam	Attendance: 1 478; Referee: Kristoffer Karlsson

=== Promotion/relegation play-offs ===
10 November 2012 First leg	Halmstads BK	3–0	GIF Sundsvall	Örjans Vall, Halmstad
14:30 CET	Magyar 59'; Steindórsson 62'; Antonsson 72'	(report) (in Swedish)	(yellow card) 68' Risholt; (yellow card) 87' Skúlason; (yellow card) 90+2' Danielsson	Attendance: 5 839; Referee: Jonas Eriksson

3 November 2012 Second leg	GIF Sundsvall	4–3	Halmstads BK	Norrporten Arena, Sundsvall
14:30 CET	Helg 29', 81'; Holster 42'; Skúlason 76'	(report) (in Swedish)	33' (pen.) Steindórsson; 68' Baldvinsson; 78' Boman	Attendance: 1 832; Referee: Martin Hansson

Halmstads BK promoted 6-4 on aggregate.

=== Svenska Cupen ===
18 August 2012 Second round	Ronneby BK	2–5	Halmstads BK	Brunnsvallen, Ronneby
15:00 CEST	8', 34' Petersson; (yellow card) 26' Berg; (yellow card) 50' Ivarsson	(report) (in Swedish)	4' Antonsson; 20' (yellow card) 60' Wrele; 75', 86' Boman; (yellow card) 80' Svensson; 83' Steindórsson	Attendance: 510; Referee: Levente Szasz

== Competitions ==
=== Superettan ===
==== Standings ====
Pos	Team	Pld	W	D	L	GF	GA	GD	Pts	Promotion, qualification or relegation
1	Östers IF (C, P)	30	20	6	4	57	28	+29	66	Promotion to Allsvenskan
2	IF Brommapojkarna (P)	30	20	1	9	61	40	+21	61	Promotion to Allsvenskan
3	Halmstads BK (O, P)	30	16	8	6	61	33	+28	56	Qualification to Promotion playoffs
4	Hammarby IF	30	13	10	7	40	33	+7	49	
5	Ljungskile SK	30	11	9	10	36	36	0	42	

Source: svenskfotboll.se (in Swedish)
Rules for classification: 1) points; 2) goal difference; 3) number of goals scored.
(C) Champions; (O) Play-off winners; (P) Promoted

==== Results summary ====
Overall								Home						Away					
Pld	W	D	L	GF	GA	GD	Pts	W	D	L	GF	GA	GD	W	D	L	GF	GA	GD
30	17	7	6	61	33	+28	58	12	2	1	33	12	+21	5	5	5	28	21	+7

Last updated: 29 October 2012.
Source: SvFF.se (in Swedish)

==== Results by round ====
Round	1	2	3	4	5	6	7	8	9	10	11	12	13	14	15	16	17	18	19	20	21	22	23	24	25	26	27	28	29	30
Ground	A	H	A	H	A	H	H	A	H	A (Note: Match moved to 17 June, following the 15 round, position will be according to all 15 rounds played)	H	A	H	A	H	A	H	A	A	H	A	H	H	A	H	A	A	H	A	H
Result	L	W	D	W	L	W	D	W	W	L	W	W	W	D	D	L	W	D	W	W	W	W	W	W	W	D	D	L	L	D
Position	12	7	7	6	7	7	7	4	2	3	4	3	3	3	3	4	3	3	3	3	3	3	3	3	2	2	3	3	3	3

Updated to match(es) played on 29 October 2012. Source: SvFF.se (in Swedish)
A = Away; H = Home; W = Win; D = Draw; L = Loss

== Season statistics ==
=== Superettan ===
Name	Matches	Goals
(Iceland) Guðjón Baldvinsson	29(+2)	16(+1)
(Sweden) Mikael Boman	30(+2)	13(+1)
(Paraguay) Antonio Rojas	27(+2)	9
(Iceland) Kristinn Steindórsson	29(+2)	7(+2)
(Sweden) Richard Magyar	27(+2)	4(+1)
(Sweden) Kristoffer Fagercrantz	11(+2)	3
(Sweden) Johnny Lundberg	28(+2)	3
(Sweden) Peter Nyström	23	2
(Sweden) Johan Blomberg	29(+2)	2
(Sweden) Marcus Antonsson	18(+2)	1(+1)
(Sweden) Christian Järdler	26(+2)	1

Goals and caps in the promotion/relegation play-offs are shown in the () as they are not official league matches.

Name	Yellow card	Yellow card Red card	Red card
(Paraguay) Antonio Rojas	4	0	1
(Sweden) Christian Järdler	9	0	0
(Sweden) Johnny Lundberg	6	0	0
(Iceland) Guðjón Baldvinsson	4	0	0
(Sweden) Johan Blomberg	4	0	0
(Sweden) Kristoffer Thydell	3	0	0
(Sweden) Richard Magyar	3	0	0
(Iceland) Kristinn Steindórsson	3	0	0
(Sweden) Peter Nyström	2	0	0
(Sweden) Kristoffer Fagercrantz	2	0	0
(United States) Ryan Miller	1	0	0
(Sweden) Joakim Wrele	1	0	0
(Sweden) Viktor Ljung	1	0	0
(Sweden) Karl-Johan Johnsson	1	0	0

= Number of bookings
= Number of sending offs after a second yellow card
= Number of sending offs by a direct red card

=== Svenska cupen ===
Name	Matches	Goals
(Sweden) Mikael Boman	1	2
(Sweden) Marcus Antonsson	1	1
(Sweden) Joakim Wrele	1	1
(Iceland) Kristinn Steindórsson	1	1

Name	Yellow card	Yellow card Red card	Red card
(Sweden) Joakim Wrele	1	0	0
(Sweden) Michael Svensson	1	0	0

= Number of bookings
= Number of sending offs after a second yellow card
= Number of sending offs by a direct red card

== International players ==
Does only contain players that represent the senior squad during the 2012 season.

=== Senior ===
Date	Typ of match	Nation	Player	Opponents	Mins.	Goals
23 January 2012	Exhibition	Sweden	Karl-Johan Johnsson	Qatar	45	0
23 January 2012	2014 FIFA World Cup qualification	Iceland	Guðjón Baldvinsson	Switzerland	8	0

=== U21 ===
Date	Typ of match	Nation	Player	Opponents	Mins.	Goals
29 February 2012	Exhibition	Sweden U21	Karl-Johan Johnsson	Russia U21	90	0
29 February 2012	Exhibition	Sweden U21	Richard Magyar	Russia U21	16	0
31 May 2012	2013 Euro U-21 qualification	Sweden U21	Karl-Johan Johnsson	Ukraine U21	90	0
6 June 2012	2013 Euro U-21 qualification	Sweden U21	Karl-Johan Johnsson	Malta U21	90	0
13 June 2012	2013 Euro U-21 qualification	Sweden U21	Karl-Johan Johnsson	Finland U21	90	0
15 August 2012	Exhibition	Sweden U21	Karl-Johan Johnsson	Romania U21	45	0
15 August 2012	Exhibition	Sweden U21	Richard Magyar	Romania U21	24	0
6 September 2012	2013 Euro U-21 qualification	Sweden U21	Karl-Johan Johnsson	Slovenia U21	90	0
10 September 2012	2013 Euro U-21 qualification	Sweden U21	Karl-Johan Johnsson	Ukraine U21	90	0
12 October 2012	2013 Euro U-21 qualification play-offs	Sweden U21	Karl-Johan Johnsson	Italy U21	90	0
16 October 2012	2013 Euro U-21 qualification play-offs	Sweden U21	Karl-Johan Johnsson	Italy U21	90	0

=== Youth ===
Date	Typ of match	Nation	Player	Opponents	Mins.	Goals
9 February 2012	Exhibition	Sweden U19	Kristoffer Thydell	Norway U19	90	0
11 February 2012	Exhibition	Sweden U19	Kristoffer Thydell	Portugal U19	12	0
13 February 2012	Exhibition	Sweden U19	Kristoffer Thydell	Hungary U19	90	0
10 June 2012	Exhibition	Sweden U18	Oliver Silverholt	Romania U18	10	0
12 June 2012	Exhibition	Sweden U18	Oliver Silverholt	Romania U18	73	0
