= 2013 Halmstads BK season =

Halmstads BK
2013 season
- Chairman: Göran Johansson
- Manager: Jens Gustafsson

In 2013 Halmstads BK competed in Allsvenskan and Svenska Cupen.

== Fixtures and results ==
=== Pre-season fixtures and results ===
26 January 2013 Match 1	Halmstads BK	1 – 2	Varbergs BoIS FC	Halmstad
13:00 CET	Magyar	(report) (in Swedish)	Özdemirok; Sjöhage	Stadium: Skedalahed IP; Attendance: 362; Referee: Daniel Stålhammar

2 February 2013 Match 2	Kalmar FF	3 – 0	Halmstads BK	Kalmar
CET	Eriksson (yellow card) 33'; McDonald 60'; Đorđević 75'; Pape Diouf 87'	(report) (in Swedish)	(yellow card) 36' Baldvinsson	Stadium: Gasten; Attendance: 1050; Referee: Magnus Ahlsén

9 February 2013 Match 3	Trelleborgs FF	0 – 4	Halmstads BK	Trelleborg
CET	Baldvinsson 3', 48', 64'; Steindórsson 76'	(report) (in Swedish)		Attendance: N/A; Referee: N/A

16 February 2013 Match 4	Halmstads BK	3 – 2	Lyngby BK (Denmark)	Halmstad
13:00 CET	Antonsson 39', 68'; Boman 74'; Magyar (red card) 80'	(report) (in Swedish)	(red card) 10' Tauber; 40' Poulsen; 76' Aabech	Stadium: Skedalahed IP; Attendance: 264; Referee: Christoffer Carlsson

23 February 2013 Match 5	Halmstads BK	3 – 2	Jönköpings Södra IF	Halmstad
13:00 CET	Selaković 33'; Antonsson 53' (yellow card); Baldvinsson 83'; Westerberg (yellow card); Blomberg (yellow card); Fagercrantz (yellow card)	(report) (in Swedish)	40' Svensson; 76' Kangaskolkka	Stadium: Skedalahed IP; Attendance: 220; Referee: Christoffer Carlsson

3 March 2013 Match 6	Halmstads BK	4 – 0	GAIS	Halmstad
13:00 CET	Selaković 4', 8'; Selaković 20', 33' (pen.)	(report) (in Swedish)		Stadium: Skedalahed IP; Attendance: N/A; Referee: Christoffer Carlsson

=== Allsvenskan ===
==== League fixtures and results ====
1 April 2013 Match 1	Malmö FF	1 – 1	Halmstads BK	Malmö
15:00 CET	Rantie 48'; Concha (yellow card) 53'	(report) (in Swedish)	(yellow card) 36' Selaković; (yellow card) 38' Westerberg; 53' Baldvinsson; (yellow card) 67' Liverstam	Stadium: Swedbank Stadion; Attendance: 19 577; Referee: Martin Strömbergsson

7 April 2013 Match 2	Halmstads BK	1 – 1	IF Elfsborg	Halmstad
17:30 CET	Fagercrantz (yellow card) 20'; Selaković 44' (pen.); Liverstam (yellow card) 70'	(report) (in Swedish)	(yellow card) 12' Rohdén; (yellow card) 33' (red card) 43' Jørgensen; 42' Keene	Stadium: Örjans Vall; Attendance: 7 659; Referee: Markus Strömbergsson

14 April 2013 Match 3	Gefle IF	2 – 0	Halmstads BK	Gävle
17:30 CET	Oremo 54'; Dahlberg 58'; Lundevall (yellow card) 65'	(report) (in Swedish)	(yellow card) 61' Westerberg	Stadium: Strömvallen; Attendance: 2 666; Referee: Andreas Ekberg

17 April 2013 Match 4	Halmstads BK	0 – 0	Åtvidabergs FF	Halmstad
19:00 CET	Magyar (yellow card) 45+1'; Selaković (yellow card) 69'	(report) (in Swedish)	(yellow card) 56' Pettersson; (yellow card) 71' Sjölund	Stadium: Örjans Vall; Attendance: 3 846; Referee: Mohammed Al-Hakim

21 April 2013 Match 5	Halmstads BK	1 – 2	Kalmar FF	Halmstad
15:00 CET	Selaković 1' (yellow card) 67'; Fagercrantz (yellow card) 42'	(report) (in Swedish)	(yellow card) 42' Diouf; 62' Ismael; 77' Romarinho; (yellow card) 81' Arajuuri	Stadium: Örjans Vall; Attendance: 4 011; Referee: Martin Hansson

28 April 2013 Match 6	AIK	3 – 3	Halmstads BK	Solna, Stockholm
15:00 CET	Moro (yellow card) 28'; Majstorović 39'; Goitom 42'; Johansson (yellow card) 57'; Igboananike 74'; Quaison (red card) 90+3'	(report) (in Swedish)	36' Boman; (yellow card) 45+1' Liverstam; 59' Baldvinsson; 90' Blomberg	Stadium: Friends Arena; Attendance: 16 711; Referee: Michael Lerjéus

5 May 2013 Match 7	Halmstads BK	1 – 0	Östers IF	Halmstad
15:00 CET	Landgren 63'; Boman (yellow card) 85'	(report) (in Swedish)	(yellow card) 40' (yellow-red card) 90+3' Arce; (yellow card) 54' Velić	Stadium: Örjans Vall; Attendance: 4 494; Referee: Bojan Pandzic

11 May 2013 Match 8	IFK Göteborg	1 – 0	Halmstads BK	Gothenburg
16:00 CET	Hysén 27'	(report) (in Swedish)	(yellow card) 15' Liverstam; (yellow card) 45+1' Selaković	Stadium: Gamla Ullevi; Attendance: 12 457; Referee: (Sweden) Martin Hansson

19 May 2013 Match 9	Djurgårdens IF	1 – 0	Halmstads BK	Stockholm
17:30 CET	Fejzullahu 54'; Broberg (yellow card) 62'	(report) (in Swedish)	(yellow card) 59' Liverstam	Stadium: Olympic Stadium; Attendance: 7 021; Referee: (Sweden) Johan Hamlin

23 May 2013 Match 10	Halmstads BK	1 – 1	IFK Norrköping	Halmstad
19:00 CET	Boman 76'	(report) (in Swedish)	70' Þorvaldsson	Stadium: Örjans Vall; Attendance: 3 180; Referee: (Sweden) Martin Hansson

1 June 2013 Match 11	Mjällby AIF	5 – 1	Halmstads BK	Hällevik
16:00 CET	Ekenberg 30'; Nilsson 60'; Henderson (yellow card) 71'; Haynes 74'; Ljung 79' (o.g.); Pode 84'	(report) (in Swedish)	(yellow card) 29' (yellow-red card) Järdler; 34' Boman	Stadium: Strandvallen; Attendance: 3 276; Referee: (Sweden) Bojan Pandzic

24 July 2013 Match 12	Halmstads BK	0 – 1	Helsingborgs IF	Halmstad
18:30 CET	Thydell (yellow card) 38'; Selaković (yellow card) 49'	(report) (in Swedish)	(yellow card) 18' Atta; 50' Gashi; (yellow card) 90+1' Santos	Stadium: Örjans Vall; Attendance: 8 834; Referee: (Sweden) Markus Strömbergsson

19 June 2013 Match 13	IF Brommapojkarna	1 – 1	Halmstads BK	Stockholm
19:00 CET	Bärkroth 55' (yellow card) 66'	(report) (in Swedish)	45+1' Selaković; (yellow card) 87' Westerberg	Stadium: Grimsta IP; Attendance: 1 414; Referee: (Sweden) Stefan Johannesson

23 June 2013 Match 14	Halmstads BK	0 – 2	BK Häcken	Halmstad
17:30 CET	Ljung (yellow card) 62'; Baldvinsson (yellow card) 81'	(report) (in Swedish)	29' El Kabir; (yellow card) 64' Zuta; 80' Sa. Gustafsson	Stadium: Örjans Vall; Attendance: 3 051; Referee: (Sweden) Martin Strömbergsson

7 July 2013 Match 15	Syrianska FC	1 – 2	Halmstads BK	Södertälje
17:30 CET	Touma 18'	(report) (in Swedish)	6' Landgren; (yellow card) 34' Magyar; 90+2' Antonsson	Stadium: Södertälje Fotbollsarena; Attendance: 1 932; Referee: (Sweden) Bojan Pandzic

13 July 2013 Match 16	IF Elfsborg	2 – 2	Halmstads BK	Borås
16:00 CET	Ishizaki (yellow card) 62'; Holmén 66'; J. Larsson (yel); Svensson (yellow card) 75'; Rohdén 86'	(report) (in Swedish)	(yellow card) 9' O. Silverholt; 24' Boman; (yellow card) 27' Landgren; 45+2' Baldvinsson; (yellow card) 73' Fagercrantz	Stadium: Borås Arena; Attendance: 7 035; Referee: (Sweden) Johan Hamlin

29 July 2013 Match 17	Halmstads BK	1 – 1	Syrianska FC	Halmstad
19:00 CET	Liverstam (yellow card) 38'; Selaković (yellow card) 68'; Westerberg (yellow card) 70'; Antonsson 79'	Summary	Rajalakso 9'; Demirtaş (yellow card) 16'; Elia (yellow card) 41'; Bååth (yellow card) 49'; Miller (yellow card) 55'; Alessandro Silva Pereira (yellow card) 69'	Stadium: Örjans Vall; Attendance: 3,971; Referee: (Sweden) Tobias Mattsson

==== League table ====
===== Overall league table =====
Pos	Team	Pld	W	D	L	GF	GA	GD	Pts	Qualification or relegation
12	Gefle IF	30	7	13	10	34	42	−8	34	
13	IF Brommapojkarna	30	8	8	14	33	54	−21	32	Qualification to Europa League first qualifying round (Note: Sweden was among the best three associations in the UEFA Fair Play ranking and thus received an additional spot in the first qualifying round of the Europa League, IF Brommapojkarna received the qualifying spot for their ranking in Allsvenskans Fair Play ranking.)
14	Halmstads BK (O)	30	7	10	13	32	46	−14	31	Qualification to Relegation play-offs
15	Östers IF (R)	30	6	10	14	27	43	−16	28	Relegation to Superettan
16	Syrianska FC (R)	30	3	5	22	26	64	−38	14	Relegation to Superettan

Source: svenskfotboll.se (in Swedish)
Rules for classification: 1) points; 2) goal difference; 3) number of goals scored.
(O) Play-off winners; (R) Relegated

===== Results summary =====
Overall								Home						Away					
Pld	W	D	L	GF	GA	GD	Pts	W	D	L	GF	GA	GD	W	D	L	GF	GA	GD
16	2	7	7	14	24	−10	13	1	3	3	4	7	−3	1	4	4	10	17	−7

Last updated: 18 December 2012.
Source: SvFF.se (in Swedish)

==== Results by round ====
Round	1	2	3	4	5	6	7	8	9	10	11	12	13	14	15	16	17	18	19	20	21	22	23	24	25	26	27	28	29	30
Ground	A	H	A	H	H	A	H	A	A	H	B	H	B	H	B	B														
Result	D	D	L	D	L	D	W	L	L	D	L	L	D	L	W	D														
Position	10	10	14	13	15	15	12	13	15	13	16	16	15	15	14	13														

Source: SvFF.se (in Swedish)
A = Away; H = Home; W = Win; D = Draw; L = Loss

=== Svenska Cupen ===
==== 2012–13 Svenska Cupen ====
===== Group four fixtures and results =====
3 March 2013 Match 1	AIK Fotboll	1 – 2	Halmstads BK	Solna Stockholm
CET	Milošević (yellow card) 50'; Quaison (yellow card) 77'; Goitom 81' (pen.); Majstorović (yellow card) 90'	(report) (in Swedish)	4' Selaković; 11' Magyar; (yellow card) 13' Westerberg	Stadium: Skytteholms IP; Attendance: 3 753; Referee: Johan Hamlin

10 March 2013 Match 2	Syrianska FC	2 – 1	Halmstads BK	Södertälje
CET	Michel (yellow card) 28'; Chanko 59'; Svard 90'	(report) (in Swedish)	Magyar (yellow card) 45'; Antonsson 57'	Stadium: Södertälje Fotbollsarena; Attendance: 500; Referee: Johan Hamlin

16 March 2013 Match 3	Halmstads BK	2 – 1	Örgryte IS	Halmstad
CET	Boman (yellow card) 29'; Magyar 75'; Rojas 77'	(report) (in Swedish)	Lindström 34' (pen.); Leinar (yellow card) 38'; Karlsson (yellow card) 59'; Azulay (yellow card) 75'; Sahlin (yellow card) 83'	Stadium: Svedala Park; Referee: Magnus Ahlsén

===== Group four table =====
Pos	Team	Pld	W	D	L	GF	GA	GD	Pts	Qualification	ÖIS	HBK	AIK	SFC
1	Örgryte IS	3	2	0	1	7	4	+3	6	Advance to Knockout stage	—	—	4–1	2–1
2	Halmstads BK	3	2	0	1	5	4	+1	6		2–1	—	—	—
3	AIK	3	1	0	2	4	6	−2	3		—	1–2	—	2–0
4	Syrianska FC	3	1	0	2	3	5	−2	3		—	2–1	—	—

== Season statistics ==
=== Goals ===
Rank	Player	Position	Allsvenskan	Svenska Cupen	Total
1	(Sweden) Mikael Boman	FW	4	2	6
2	(Sweden) Stefan Selaković	RW	3	2	5
3	(Iceland) Guðjón Baldvinsson	FW	3	0	3
3	(Sweden) Marcus Antonsson	FW	1	2	3
4	(Sweden) Richard Magyar	CB	0	2	2
4	(Sweden) Andreas Landgren	DM	2	0	2
4	(Iceland) Kristinn Steindórsson	LW	0	1	1
4	(Paraguay) Antonio Rojas	CM	0	1	1
4	(Sweden) Joakim Wrele	LW	0	1	1
4	(Sweden) Johan Blomberg	W	1	0	1
Own goals			0	0	0
Total			14	11	16

Last updated: 10 April 2013
Source: Match reports in SvFF.se

=== Disciplinary record ===
Rank	Pos.	No.	Player	Allsvenskan			Svenska Cupen			Total		
Rank	Pos.	No.	Player	Yellow card	(yellow card) (yellow-red card)	Red card	Yellow card	(yellow card) (yellow-red card)	Red card	Yellow card	(yellow card) (yellow-red card)	Red card
1	CB	2	(Sweden) Fredrik Liverstam	5	0	0	0	0	0	5	0	0
1	RW	11	(Sweden) Stefan Selaković	5	0	0	0	0	0	5	0	0
2	RB	28	(Sweden) Jesper Westerberg	3	0	0	1	0	0	4	0	0
3	CM	8	(Sweden) Kristoffer Fagercrantz	3	0	0	0	0	0	3	0	0
3	CB	25	(Sweden) Richard Magyar	2	0	0	1	0	0	3	0	0
4	FW	14	(Sweden) Mikael Boman	1	0	0	1	0	0	2	0	0
4	LB	14	(Sweden) Christian Järdler	0	1	0	0	0	0	0	1	0
3	LW	26	(Sweden) Joakim Wrele	0	0	0	1	0	0	1	0	0
3	CB	20	(Sweden) Michael Svensson	0	0	0	1	0	0	1	0	0
3	FW	20	(Iceland) Guðjón Baldvinsson	1	0	0	0	0	0	1	0	0
3	M	20	(Sweden) Kristoffer Thydell	1	0	0	0	0	0	1	0	0
3	WB	20	(Sweden) Viktor Ljung	1	0	0	0	0	0	1	0	0
3	LB	20	(Sweden) Oliver Silverholt	1	0	0	0	0	0	1	0	0
3	DM	20	(Sweden) Andreas Landgren	1	0	0	0	0	0	1	0	0
TOTALS				24	1	0	5	0	0	29	1	0

== Player information ==
=== Squad ===
Statistics prior to season start only

Squad Season 2013
No.	Player	Nat.	Birthdate	In Halmstads BK since	Previous club	Caps for Halmstads BK (Note: Both league and cup included)	Goals for Halmstads BK
Goalkeepers
1	Stojan Lukić	(Sweden)	28 December 1979 (age 46)	2013	Falkenbergs FF	0	0
12	Rasmus Rydén	(Sweden)	23 March 1983 (age 43)	2012	Östers IF	1	0
30	Malkolm Nilsson	(Sweden)	3 August 1993 (age 33)	2010	BK Astrio	0	0
Defenders
2	Viktor Ljung	(Sweden)	19 April 1991 (age 35)	2010	Youth Team	29	0
3	Fredrik Liverstam	(Sweden)	4 March 1988 (age 38)	2013	Landskrona BoIS	0	0
16	Christian Järdler	(Sweden)	3 June 1982 (age 44)	2009	Malmö FF	82	1
20	Michael Svensson	(Sweden)	25 November 1975 (age 50)	2011	Free transfer	94 (Note: Matches from earlier spell with the club included)	5
21	Anton Tideman	(Sweden)	2 September 1992 (age 34)	2011	Laholms FK	0	0
25	Richard Magyar	(Sweden)	3 May 1991 (age 35)	2010	Youth Team	55	5
27	Marcus Johansson	(Sweden)	24 August 1993 (age 33)	2013	Youth Team	0	0
28	Jesper Westerberg	(Sweden)	1 February 1986 (age 40)	2013	(Norway) Lillestrøm SK	61	2
Midfielders
4	Andreas Landgren	(Sweden)	17 March 1989 (age 37)	2013	(Norway) Fredrikstad FK	0	0
5	Peter Nyström	(Sweden)	27 August 1984 (age 42)	2012	BK Häcken	24	0
6	Johan Blomberg	(Sweden)	14 June 1987 (age 39)	2012	Ängelholms FF	32	2
7	Kristinn Steindórsson	(Iceland)	29 April 1990 (age 36)	2012	(Iceland) Breiðablik UBK	32	10
8	Kristoffer Fagercrantz	(Sweden)	9 October 1986 (age 40)	2013	Kalmar FF	16	3
10	Antonio Rojas	(Paraguay)	27 March 1984 (age 42)	2012	Ängelholms FF	29	9
11	Stefan Selaković	(Sweden)	9 January 1977 (age 49)	2013	Free transfer	119	37
13	Kristoffer Thydell	(Sweden)	17 March 1993 (age 33)	2010	Youth Team	39	0
15	Anton Jonsson	(Sweden)	31 January 1993 (age 33)	2008	Alets IK	16	0
17	Oliver Silverholt	(Sweden)	22 June 1994 (age 32)	2010	BK Astrio	8	0
24	Simon Silverholt	(Sweden)	17 June 1993 (age 33)	2013	Youth Team	0	0
Forwards
9	Guðjón Baldvinsson	(Iceland)	15 February 1986 (age 40)	2012	(Iceland) KR Reykjavíkur	31	17
14	Mikael Boman	(Sweden)	14 July 1988 (age 38)	2012	Falkenbergs FF	33	16
18	Shkodran Maholli	(Sweden)	10 April 1993 (age 33)	2013	Youth Team	2	0
19	Liridon Selmani	(Albania)	12 June 1992 (age 34)	2011	Hyltebruks IF	5	0
23	Marcus Antonsson	(Sweden)	8 May 1991 (age 35)	2011	Youth Team	28	3
Out on Loan
26	Joakim Wrele	(Sweden)	7 January 1991 (age 35)	2010	Youth Team	17	1
Last updated: 17 April 2012

=== Squad statistics ===
==== Appearances and goals ====
As of 18 December 2012

No.	Pos	Nat	Player	Total		Allsvenskan		Svenska Cupen		Other	
No.	Pos	Nat	Player	Apps	Goals	Apps	Goals	Apps	Goals	Apps	Goals
1	GK	(Sweden) SWE	Stojan Lukić	21	0	16	0	3	0	2	0
2	DF	(Sweden) SWE	Viktor Ljung	8	0	4	0	0	0	4	0
3	DF	(Sweden) SWE	Fredrik Liverstam	21	1	15	0	2	1	4	0
4	MF	(Sweden) SWE	Andreas Landgren	14	2	14	2	0	0	0	0
5	MF	(Sweden) SWE	Peter Nyström	8	0	5	0	1	0	2	0
6	MF	(Sweden) SWE	Johan Blomberg	22	1	16	1	2	0	4	0
7	MF	(Iceland) ISL	Kristinn Steindórsson	20	1	14	0	2	0	4	1
8	MF	(Sweden) SWE	Kristoffer Fagercrantz	20	0	15	0	3	0	2	0
9	FW	(Iceland) ISL	Guðjón Baldvinsson	22	7	16	3	3	0	3	4
10	MF	(Paraguay) PAR	Antonio Rojas	18	1	12	0	2	1	4	0
11	MF	(Sweden) SWE	Stefan Selaković	21	5	15	3	3	1	3	1
12	GK	(Sweden) SWE	Rasmus Rydén	2	0	0	0	0	0	2	0
13	MF	(Sweden) SWE	Kristoffer Thydell	6	0	3	0	0	0	3	0
14	FW	(Sweden) SWE	Mikael Boman	22	5	15	4	3	0	4	1
15	MF	(Sweden) SWE	Anton Jonsson	1	0	0	0	0	0	1	0
16	DF	(Sweden) SWE	Christian Järdler	16	0	11	0	2	0	3	0
17	DF	(Sweden) SWE	Oliver Silverholt	9	0	7	0	1	0	1	0
18	DF	(Sweden) SWE	Shkodran Maholli	5	0	3	0	1	0	1	0
19	FW	(Albania) ALB	Liridon Selmani	1	0	0	0	0	0	1	0
20	DF	(Sweden) SWE	Michael Svensson	3	0	0	0	0	0	3	0
21	DF	(Sweden) SWE	Anton Tideman	4	0	0	0	1	0	3	0
23	FW	(Sweden) SWE	Marcus Antonsson	16	4	10	1	2	1	4	2
24	MF	(Sweden) SWE	Simon Silverholt	0	0	0	0	0	0	0	0
25	DF	(Sweden) SWE	Richard Magyar	22	2	16	0	3	1	3	1
26	MF	(Sweden) SWE	Joakim Wrele	0	0	0	0	0	0	0	0
27	DF	(Sweden) SWE	Marcus Johansson	0	0	0	0	0	0	0	0
28	DF	(Sweden) SWE	Jesper Westerberg	18	0	15	0	3	0	0	0
30	GK	(Sweden) SWE	Malkolm Nilsson	1	0	0	0	1	0	0	0

=== Transfers ===
==== In ====
No.	Pos.	Nat.	Name	Age	EU	Moving from	Type	Transfer window	Ends	Transfer fee	Source
	GK	(Sweden)	Lukić	32	EU	Falkenbergs FF	Transfer	Winter		N/A	Halmstads BK
	DF	(Sweden)	Liverstam	24	EU	Landskrona BoIS	Transfer	Winter		N/A	Halmstads BK
	MF	(Sweden)	Fagercrantz	26	EU	Kalmar FF	Transfer	Winter		N/A	Halmstads BK
	MF	(Sweden)	Silverholt	19	EU	Youth squad		Winter			Halmstads BK
	MF	(Sweden)	Selaković	36	EU		Transfer	Winter		free	Halmstads BK
	DF	(Sweden)	Westerberg	27	EU		Transfer	Winter		free	Halmstads BK
	MF	(Sweden)	Landgren	24	EU	Fredrikstad (Norway)	Loan	Winter		loan	Halmstads BK

==== Out ====
No.	Pos.	Nat.	Name	Age	EU	Moving to	Type	Transfer window	Transfer fee	Source
	GK	(Sweden)	Johnsson	22	EU	NEC (Netherlands)	Transfer	Winter	free	Halmstads BK
	MF	(Sweden)	Fagercrantz	26	EU	Kalmar FF	Loan end	Winter		Halmstads BK
	MF	(Sweden)	Rexhepi	19	EU		Free transfer	Winter		fotbolltransfers.com
	DF	(United States)	Miller	28	Non-EU	Portland Timbers (United States)	Free transfer	Winter		Portland Timbers
	DF	(Sweden)	Lundberg	30	EU	Sandnes Ulf (Norway)	Free transfer	Winter		fotbolltransfers.com
	DF	(Sweden)	Klang	20	EU	IS Halmia	Free transfer	Winter		fotbolltransfers.com
	MF	(Sweden)	Wrele	22	EU	ÍA (Iceland)	Loan	Winter		Halmstads BK

Last updated: 18 December 2012
