= 2012 Superettan =

Superettan
- Season: 2012
- Champions: Östers IF
- Promoted: Östers IF; IF Brommapojkarna; Halmstads BK
- Relegated: Trelleborgs FF; Umeå FC
- Matches: 240
- Goals: 722 (3.01 per match)
- Top goalscorer: Pablo Piñones Arce (18)
- Biggest home win: Degerfors IF 6–1 IFK Värnamo; IFK Värnamo 5–0 Umeå FC
- Biggest away win: Umeå FC 0–4 Östers IF; Umeå FC 0–4 Halmstads BK; IFK Värnamo 1–5 Jönköpings Södra IF
- Highest scoring: IK Brage 4–4 Varbergs BoIS FC
- Highest attendance: 12,173; Östers IF 1–1 IFK Värnamo
- Lowest attendance: 64; Ljungskile SK 1–1 Ängelholms FF
- Average attendance: 2,456

The 2012 Superettan, part of the 2012 Swedish football season, was the 13th season of Sweden's second-tier football league in its current format. The 2012 fixtures were released on 9 December 2011. The season began on 6 April 2012 and ended on 3 November 2012.

== Teams ==
A total of 16 teams contested the league, 12 returning from the 2011 season, two relegated from Allsvenskan and two promoted from Division 1. The top two teams qualified directly for promotion to Allsvenskan, the third had to play a play-off against the fourteenth from Allsvenskan to decide who will play in Allsvenskan 2013. The bottom two teams qualified directly for relegation to Division 1, the thirteenth and the fourteenth had to play a play-off against the numbers two from Division 1 Södra and Division 1 Norra to decide who will play in Superettan 2013.

2011-champions Åtvidabergs FF and runner-up GIF Sundsvall were promoted to the Allsvenskan at the end of the 2011 season. They were replaced by Halmstads BK and Trelleborgs FF. Västerås SK and Qviding FIF were relegated at the end of the 2011 season after finishing in the bottom two places of the table. They were replaced by Division 1 Norra champions Umeå FC and Division 1 Södra champions Varbergs BoIS.

=== Stadia and locations ===
Location of the 2012 Superettan teams

Team	Location	Stadium	Stadium capacity^{1}
Assyriska FF	Södertälje	Södertälje Fotbollsarena	7,500
IK Brage	Borlänge	Domnarvsvallen	5,500
IF Brommapojkarna	Stockholm	Grimsta IP	8,000
Degerfors IF	Degerfors	Stora Valla	12,500
Falkenbergs FF	Falkenberg	Falkenbergs IP	6,000
Halmstads BK	Halmstad	Örjans Vall	15,500
Hammarby IF	Stockholm	Söderstadion	15,600
Jönköpings Södra IF	Jönköping	Stadsparksvallen	5,200
Landskrona BoIS	Landskrona	Landskrona IP	12,000
Ljungskile SK	Ljungskile	Starke Arvid Arena	8,000
Trelleborgs FF	Trelleborg	Vångavallen	10,000
Umeå FC	Umeå	T3 Arena	10,000
Varbergs BoIS	Varberg	Påskbergsvallen	4,000
IFK Värnamo	Värnamo	Finnvedsvallen	5,000
Ängelholms FF	Ängelholm	Ängelholms IP	5,000
Östers IF	Växjö	Värendsvallen (Until 22 August 2012)	13,000
Östers IF	Växjö	Myresjöhus Arena (From 3 September 2012)	12,000

- ^{1} Correct as of end of 2012 season

=== Personnel and kits ===
Note: Flags indicate national team as has been defined under FIFA eligibility rules. Players and Managers may hold more than one non-FIFA nationality.

Team	Head coach	Captain	Kit manufacturer	Shirt sponsor
Assyriska FF	(Bosnia and Herzegovina) Valentic Azrudin	(Sweden) Göran Marklund	Nike	Scania
IK Brage	(Sweden) Bo Wålemark (Sweden) Örjan Glans	(Ukraine) Vyacheslav Jevtushenko	Puma	SSAB
IF Brommapojkarna	(Sweden) Roberth Björknesjö	(Sweden) Pontus Segerström	adidas	Various
Degerfors IF	(Sweden) Patrik Werner	(Sweden) Tobias Solberg	adidas	Outokumpu
Falkenbergs FF	(Sweden) Thomas Askebrand	(Sweden) David Svensson	Nike	Various
Halmstads BK	(Sweden) Jens Gustafsson	(Sweden) Johnny Lundberg	Puma	ICA
Hammarby IF	(United States) Gregg Berhalter	(Sweden) Andreas Dahl	Kappa	Pepsi
Jönköpings Södra IF	(Sweden) Mats Gren	(Sweden) Dennis Östlundh	Nike	Various
Landskrona BoIS	(Sweden) Henrik Larsson	(Sweden) Linus Malmqvist	Masita	Various
Ljungskile SK	(Sweden) Tor-Arne Fredheim	(Bosnia and Herzegovina) Aleksandar Kitić	Umbro	Various
Trelleborgs FF	(Sweden) Anders Grimberg	(Sweden) Kristian Haynes	Masita	Trelleborg
Umeå FC	(England) Stuart Gibson (Sweden) Örjan Andersson	(Sweden) Erik Lundström	adidas	Norrporten
Varbergs BoIS	(Sweden) Halda Kabil	(Sweden) Fredrik Björk	Umbro	Various
IFK Värnamo	(Sweden) Jörgen Petersson	(Sweden) Tobias Englund	adidas	Various
Ängelholms FF	(Sweden) Joakim Persson	(Sweden) Jakob Augustsson	adidas	Peab
Östers IF	(Sweden) Roar Hansen	(Sweden) Denis Velić	Umbro	ICA

=== Managerial changes ===
Team	Outgoing manager	Manner of departure	Date of vacancy	Table	Incoming manager	Date of appointment	Table
IFK Värnamo	(Sweden) Tony Johansson	End of shared leadership	7 October 2011	Pre-season			
Jönköpings Södra IF	(Sweden) Hans Lindbom	Mutual consent	22 October 2011	Pre-season	(Sweden) Mats Gren	2 December 2011	Pre-season
Ljungskile SK	(Sweden) Bo Wålemark	Resigned	23 October 2011	Pre-season	(Sweden) Tor-Arne Fredheim	12 December 2011	Pre-season
Trelleborgs FF	(Sweden) Tom Prahl	Resigned	26 October 2011	Pre-season	(Sweden) Alf Westerberg	7 November 2011	Pre-season
Assyriska FF	(Republic of Ireland) Pat Walker	Sacked	11 November 2011	Pre-season	(Bosnia and Herzegovina) Valentic Azrudin	15 November 2011	Pre-season
Ängelholms FF	(Sweden) Christoffer Skoog	End of shared leadership	15 November 2011	Pre-season			
IK Brage	(Sweden) Jonas Björkgren	End of tenure as caretaker	17 November 2011	Pre-season	(Sweden) Bo Wålemark	17 November 2011	Pre-season
Hammarby IF	(Sweden) Roger Sandberg	End of tenure as caretaker	12 December 2011	Pre-season	(United States) Gregg Berhalter	12 December 2011	Pre-season
Trelleborgs FF	(Sweden) Alf Westerberg	Resigned	15 June 2012	14th	(Sweden) Anders Grimberg (as caretaker)	15 June 2012	14th
IFK Värnamo	(Sweden) Glenn Ståhl	Mutual consent	12 July 2012	16th	(Sweden) Jörgen Petersson	12 July 2012	16th

== League table ==
Pos	Team	Pld	W	D	L	GF	GA	GD	Pts	Promotion, qualification or relegation
1	Östers IF (C, P)	30	20	6	4	57	28	+29	66	Promotion to Allsvenskan
2	IF Brommapojkarna (P)	30	20	1	9	61	40	+21	61	Promotion to Allsvenskan
3	Halmstads BK (O, P)	30	16	8	6	61	33	+28	56	Qualification to Promotion playoffs
4	Hammarby IF	30	13	10	7	40	33	+7	49	
5	Ljungskile SK	30	11	9	10	36	36	0	42	
6	Landskrona BoIS	30	12	5	13	35	43	−8	41	
7	Jönköpings Södra IF	30	10	10	10	52	47	+5	40	
8	Assyriska FF	30	11	6	13	44	49	−5	39	
9	Ängelholms FF	30	10	9	11	40	46	−6	39	
10	IK Brage	30	10	9	11	35	45	−10	39	
11	Varbergs BoIS	30	8	13	9	49	52	−3	37	
12	Degerfors IF	30	9	8	13	46	53	−7	35	
13	Falkenbergs FF (O)	30	8	10	12	45	47	−2	34	Qualification to Relegation playoffs
14	IFK Värnamo (O)	30	8	6	16	47	54	−7	30	Qualification to Relegation playoffs
15	Trelleborgs FF (R)	30	8	5	17	40	55	−15	29	Relegation to Division 1
16	Umeå FC (R)	30	6	5	19	34	61	−27	23	Relegation to Division 1

Source: svenskfotboll.se (in Swedish)
Rules for classification: 1) points; 2) goal difference; 3) number of goals scored.
(C) Champions; (O) Play-off winners; (P) Promoted; (R) Relegated

== Relegation play-offs ==
7 November 2012
19:00

BK Forward	0 – 0	Falkenbergs FF
	Report

Behrn Arena, Örebro
Attendance: 2,661
Referee: Dragan Banjac (Haninge)
11 November 2012
14:00

Falkenbergs FF	2 – 1	BK Forward
Krizanović 9'; Svahn 69'	Report	14' (o.g.)

Falkenbergs IP, Falkenberg
Referee: Kristoffer Karlsson (Helsingborg)

Falkenbergs FF won 2–1 on aggregate.

7 November 2012
19:00

Lunds BK	0 – 2	IFK Värnamo
	Report	Ferizi 45'; Abdulrahman 84'

Klostergårdens IP, Lund
Attendance: 1,888
Referee: Magnus Ahlsén (Linköping)
11 November 2012
15:00

IFK Värnamo	2 – 2	Lunds BK
Abdulrahman 15'; Zlojutro 40'	Report	Jönsson 77'; Björkén 85'

Finnvedsvallen, Värnamo
Attendance: 1,778
Referee: Mohammed Al-Hakim (Köping)

IFK Värnamo won 4–2 on aggregate.

== Positions by round ==
Note: Some matches were played out of phase with the corresponding round, positions were corrected in hindsight.

Team ╲ Round	1	2	3	4	5	6	7	8	9	10	11	12	13	14	15	16	17	18	19	20	21	22	23	24	25	26	27	28	29	30
Östers IF	5	5	4	3	2	1	1	1	1	1	1	1	1	1	1	1	1	1	1	1	1	1	1	1	1	1	1	1	1	1
IF Brommapojkarna	3	4	6	5	5	3	6	3	5	3	3	2	2	2	2	2	2	2	2	2	2	2	2	2	3	3	2	2	2	2
Halmstads BK	12	7	7	6	7	7	7	4	2	4	4	3	3	3	3	4	3	3	3	3	3	3	3	3	2	2	3	3	3	3
Hammarby IF	4	3	3	1	1	2	2	2	3	2	2	4	4	5	5	6	6	6	7	7	5	4	4	4	5	4	4	4	4	4
Ljungskile SK	14	15	14	12	10	9	10	10	8	10	7	6	5	7	7	5	5	5	6	4	7	5	5	5	4	5	5	5	5	5
Landskrona BoIS	11	13	10	10	8	10	9	6	7	6	5	5	7	6	8	7	7	7	4	5	6	7	8	8	10	7	9	8	6	6
Jönköpings Södra IF	2	1	2	2	3	4	4	7	9	12	9	12	8	8	6	8	9	10	11	9	9	10	9	10	11	10	8	7	9	7
Assyriska FF	1	2	1	4	4	6	3	5	6	8	11	9	11	11	11	12	13	12	12	13	13	13	12	12	12	12	11	12	11	8
Ängelholms FF	7	6	9	7	6	5	5	8	4	5	8	7	6	4	4	3	4	4	5	6	4	6	6	6	6	6	6	6	7	9
IK Brage	16	9	5	9	11	11	11	12	11	9	6	10	10	10	10	10	8	9	8	8	8	8	7	7	7	8	7	10	8	10
Varbergs BoIS	6	8	11	8	9	8	8	9	10	7	10	8	9	9	9	11	11	11	9	10	10	11	10	9	9	11	12	9	10	11
Degerfors IF	15	16	15	16	15	15	12	13	12	13	13	13	14	13	14	14	14	14	13	12	12	12	13	13	13	13	13	13	13	12
Falkenbergs FF	8	12	12	13	13	12	13	11	13	11	12	11	12	12	12	9	10	8	10	11	11	9	11	11	8	9	10	11	12	13
IFK Värnamo	13	14	16	15	16	16	16	16	15	15	15	16	16	16	16	15	16	15	16	16	15	15	16	15	16	16	16	15	15	14
Trelleborgs FF	9	10	13	14	12	13	14	14	14	14	14	14	13	14	13	13	12	13	14	14	14	14	14	14	14	14	14	14	14	15
Umeå FC	10	11	8	11	14	14	15	15	16	16	16	15	15	15	15	16	15	16	15	15	16	16	15	16	15	15	15	16	16	16

Promotion to Allsvenskan
Promotion play-offs
Relegation play-offs
Relegation to Division 1

Source: svenskfotboll.se (in Swedish)

== Results ==
Home \ Away	AFF	IKB	BP	DIF	FFF	HBK	HAM	JSIF	LAN	LSK	TFF	UFC	VAR	IFKV	ÄFF	ÖIF
Assyriska FF		3–1	0–2	0–0	0–0	2–1	1–1	4–1	2–1	2–0	2–5	1–1	0–0	3–0	1–4	1–0
IK Brage	2–1		1–2	1–1	1–0	2–1	0–2	1–0	2–1	1–1	3–1	0–0	4–4	1–1	1–1	0–1
IF Brommapojkarna	4–2	4–1		1–0	1–0	0–3	2–1	3–2	2–0	0–1	2–0	2–1	5–1	2–4	4–0	3–1
Degerfors IF	4–2	3–2	0–2		2–3	2–2	1–3	1–3	2–0	2–1	2–1	1–2	3–1	6–1	1–1	2–2
Falkenbergs FF	1–1	1–2	3–1	4–1		3–1	1–3	1–1	1–2	1–1	2–0	1–1	1–1	3–2	2–2	1–1
Halmstads BK	3–1	4–0	2–0	2–0	1–1		2–0	3–2	1–1	1–0	3–1	3–0	3–1	2–3	0–0	3–2
Hammarby IF	0–2	3–1	3–1	4–2	2–2	1–0		2–2	0–0	0–1	0–0	1–0	1–1	1–0	2–1	0–2
Jönköpings Södra IF	2–0	0–1	3–2	2–2	2–1	1–1	1–1		2–0	4–1	2–0	3–3	1–1	1–0	2–2	3–3
Landskrona BoIS	3–2	1–0	1–2	0–0	2–1	3–3	4–1	3–2		2–1	0–3	2–1	2–1	0–1	1–0	1–2
Ljungskile SK	3–1	1–1	3–1	3–3	2–1	0–0	0–1	1–0	2–0		1–0	2–0	2–2	3–2	1–1	0–1
Trelleborgs FF	3–2	1–1	0–4	0–2	3–1	1–2	2–1	0–1	0–1	1–0		4–2	2–2	1–2	1–1	2–3
Umeå FC	1–3	1–2	1–3	3–0	2–1	0–4	1–2	1–0	3–1	0–1	5–1		1–2	1–1	1–3	0–4
Varbergs BoIS	1–2	2–2	2–2	1–0	1–0	2–2	2–2	4–1	3–0	3–1	2–2	2–1		1–1	1–3	2–4
IFK Värnamo	1–2	3–0	0–1	2–3	3–4	2–5	0–1	1–5	1–1	2–2	3–0	5–0	0–1		4–0	1–2
Ängelholms FF	3–1	0–1	0–2	2–0	1–3	0–2	1–1	2–2	2–1	3–1	1–4	1–0	3–2	1–0		0–2
Östers IF	1–0	1–0	4–1	2–0	4–1	2–1	0–0	2–1	0–1	0–0	2–1	5–1	1–0	1–1	2–1	

Source: svenskfotboll.se (in Swedish)
Legend: Blue = home team win; Yellow = draw; Red = away team win.

== Season statistics ==
Top scorers
Rank	Player	Club	Goals
1	(Sweden) Pablo Piñones Arce	IF Brommapojkarna	18
2	(Sweden) Robin Simović	Ängelholms FF	17
3	(Iceland) Guðjón Baldvinsson	Halmstads BK	16
3	(Sweden) Freddy Söderberg	Östers IF	16
5	(Sweden) Nabil Bahoui	IF Brommapojkarna	15
6	(Sweden) Patrik Larsson	Varbergs BoIS FC	14
7	(Sweden) Mikael Boman	Halmstads BK	13
8	(Sweden) Gabriel Altemark Vanneryr	Varbergs BoIS FC	12
8	(Sweden) Fuad Hyseni	Assyriska FF	12
8	(Bosnia and Herzegovina) Dragan Kapčević	IK Brage	12

Top assists
Rank	Player	Club	Assists
1	(Sweden) Denis Velić	Östers IF	11
2	(Sweden) Nahir Besara	Assyriska FF	9
3	(Sweden) Gabriel Altemark Vanneryr	Varbergs BoIS FC	8
3	(Sweden) Zoran Jovanović	Trelleborgs FF	8
3	(Sweden) Stefan Karlsson	Östers IF	8
3	(United States) Ryan Miller	Halmstads BK	8
3	(Sweden) Pablo Piñones Arce	IF Brommapojkarna	8
3	(Iceland) Kristinn Steindórsson	Halmstads BK	8
9	(Sweden) Patrik Bojent	Östers IF	7
9	(Liberia) Amadaiya Rennie	Degerfors IF	7
9	(Sweden) Jonas Lindberg	Varbergs BoIS	7
9	(Sweden) Björn Westerblad	Ängelholms FF	7

=== Top goalkeepers ===
(Minimum of 10 games played)

Rank	Goalkeeper	Club	GP	GA	SV%	ShO
1	(Sweden) Zlatan Azinović	Trelleborgs FF	12	19	78	1
2	(Sweden) Johannes Hopf	Hammarby IF	30	33	77	9
2	(Sweden) Karl-Johan Johnsson	Halmstads BK	30	33	77	11
2	(Sweden) Alexander Nadj	Östers IF	30	28	77	11
5	(United States) Brian Edwards	Degerfors IF	28	44	76	5
5	(Sweden) Marcus Sandberg	Ljungskile SK	26	30	76	8
7	(Sweden) Ivo Vazgeč	Landskrona BoIS	28	39	74	6
7	(Sweden) Fredrik Persson	Trelleborgs FF	11	15	74	2
7	(Sweden) Hampus Nilsson	Ängelholms FF	14	22	74	1
7	(Bosnia and Herzegovina) Stojan Lukić	Falkenbergs FF	30	47	74	2
7	(Sweden) Niklas Helgesson	Jönköpings Södra	24	32	74	4

=== Hat-tricks ===
Player	For	Against	Result	Date
(Northern Ireland) Daryl Smylie	Jönköpings Södra	Ljungskile SK	4–1	16 April 2012
(England) Kenny Pavey	Ljungskile SK	Assyriska FF	3–1	27 May 2012
(Sweden) Gabriel Altemark Vanneryr	Varbergs BoIS	Jönköpings Södra	4–1	2 June 2012
(Iceland) Guðjón Baldvinsson	Halmstads BK	Brage	2–5	16 June 2012
(Sweden) Pablo Piñones Arce	IF Brommapojkarna	Varbergs BoIS	5–1	20 June 2012
(Sweden) Robin Simović	Ängelholms FF	Varbergs BoIS	1–3	21 July 2012
(Sweden) Pablo Piñones Arce	IF Brommapojkarna	Umeå FC	1–3	3 September 2012
(Sweden) Victor Sköld	Falkenbergs FF	Degerfors IF	2–3	3 September 2012
(Sweden) Robin Simović	Ängelholms FF	Assyriska FF	1–4	23 September 2012
(Sweden) Abdul Rahman Khalili	IFK Värnamo	Falkenbergs FF	3–4	27 September 2012
(Sweden) Freddy Söderberg	Östers IF	Umeå FC	5–1	1 October 2012
(Sweden) Nabil Bahoui	IF Brommapojkarna	Treleborgs FF	0-4	2 October 2012
(Sweden) Mattias Adelstam	Hammarby IF	Degerfors IF	4–2	8 October 2012

- ^{4} Player scored 4 goals

=== Attendance ===
Club	Home		Away		Total	
Club	Average	Total	Average	Total	Average	Total
Hammarby IF	8,463	126,947	4,113	61,688	6,288	188,635
Östers IF	4,733	71,002	2,680	40,197	3,707	111,199
Halmstads BK	3,375	50,621	2,801	42,012	3,088	92,633
Varbergs BoIS FC	2,470	37,055	2,624	39,355	2,547	76,410
Landskrona BoIS	2,459	36,892	2,119	31,779	2,289	68,671
Jönköpings Södra IF	2,421	36,311	2,371	35,560	2,396	71,871
Degerfors IF	2,054	30,806	2,193	32,898	2,123	63,704
Umeå FC	2,046	30,687	2,018	30,277	2,032	60,964
IK Brage	1,967	29,502	2,231	33,458	2,009	62,960
Assyriska FF	1,924	28,856	2,272	34,085	2,098	62,941
Falkenbergs FF	1,577	23,658	2,632	39,479	2,105	63,137
IFK Värnamo	1,523	22,846	2,632	39,483	2,078	62,329
Trelleborgs FF	1,364	20,460	2,039	30,586	1,702	51,046
IF Brommapojkarna	1,239	18,580	2,239	33,583	1,739	52,163
Ängelholms FF	905	13,569	2,300	34,507	1,603	48,076
Ljungskile SK	778	11,665	2,034	30,510	1,406	42,175
League					2,456	589,457

== See also ==
Competitions

- 2012 Allsvenskan
- 2012 Division 1
- 2012 Supercupen

Team seasons

- 2012 Halmstads BK season

Transfers

- List of Swedish football transfers winter 2011–2012
- List of Swedish football transfers summer 2012
