= Thydell =

Thydell is a Swedish surname. Notable people with the surname include:

- Johanna Thydell (born 1980), Swedish writer
- Kristoffer Thydell (born 1993), Swedish footballer
