= Tobias Karlsson =

Tobias Karlsson may refer to:

- Tobias Karlsson (figure skater), Swedish figure skater
- Tobias Karlsson (songwriter), Swedish songwriter, record producer and entrepreneur
- Tobias Karlsson (handballer) (born 1981), Swedish handballer
- Tobias Karlsson (dancer) (born 1977), competitive dancer and choreographer
- Tobias Karlsson (footballer) (born 1989), Swedish footballer

== See also ==
- Tobias Carlsson (disambiguation)
