= Shkodran Maholli =

Swedish footballer

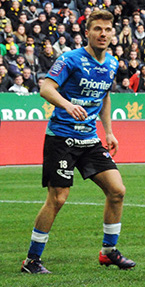
- Maholli in 2015

Personal information
- Date of birth: 10 April 1993 (age 33)
- Place of birth: Hyltebruk, Sweden
- Height: 1.86 m (6 ft 1 in)
- Position: Forward

Team information
- Current team: Brage
- Number: 19

Youth career
- –2005: Hyltebruks IF
- 2006–2011: Halmstads BK

Senior career*
Years	Team	Apps	(Gls)
2011–2015	Halmstads BK	15	(0)
2016	Åtvidabergs FF	28	(15)
2017	BK Häcken	9	(0)
2017–2018	IK Sirius	28	(7)
2018–2020	Silkeborg IF	41	(7)
2020	Helsingborgs IF	3	(0)
2021	SUS		
2021–	Brage	9	(2)

International career
2011	Sweden U19	2	(0)
- * Club domestic league appearances and goals as of 7 November 2021

Shkodran Maholli (born 10 April 1993) is a Swedish professional footballer who plays as a striker for Brage.

== Career ==
Starting his career in Hyltebruks IF, Maholli moved to Halmstads BK youth squad in 2006 at the age of 13. He suffered from a long range of injuries which prevented him from taking part of entire seasons. During the 2011 pre-season he made his debut first for the U21 team and then the senior team nine days later in the friendly derby against IS Halmia. He then participated in the friendly against Kalmar FF, before making his first competitive match as he made the starting lineup against Kalmar FF in Allsvenskan just a week later.

After representing Halmstad in two league matches, Maholli suffered an injury during the summer which kept him away from the senior team for the rest of the season, prior to the 2012 season he was moved down from the senior team to the U19 squad.

In July 2018, Maholli moved abroad for the first time in his career, signing with Silkeborg IF in the Danish 1st Division.

In August 2020 he was signed by Helsingborgs IF at a 1/2 year contract.

== Personal life ==
Shkodrans parents moved to Sweden in 1986. His father Shygeri played football for Rydöbruk IF in Division 5, while his two brothers, Shqipron and Kushtrim, played for Torup/Rydö FF and IS Halmia respectively.

== Career statistics ==
As of match played on 1 August 2020

Appearances and goals by club, season and competition
Club	Season	League			Cup		Other		Total	
Club	Season	Division	Apps	Goals	Apps	Goals	Apps	Goals	Apps	Goals
Halmstad	2013	Allsvenskan	3	0	2	1	0	0	5	1
Halmstad	2014	Allsvenskan	0	0	0	0	0	0	0	0
Halmstad	2015	Allsvenskan	12	0	1	1	0	0	13	1
Halmstad	Total		15	0	3	2	0	0	18	2
Åtvidaberg	2016	Superettan	28	15	1	0	0	0	29	15
Häcken	2017	Allsvenskan	9	0	2	0	0	0	11	0
Sirius	2017	Allsvenskan	15	6	0	0	0	0	15	6
Sirius	2018	Allsvenskan	13	1	1	0	0	0	14	1
Sirius	Total		28	7	1	0	0	0	29	7
Silkeborg	2018–19	Danish 1st Division	25	5	0	0	0	0	25	5
Silkeborg	2019–20	Danish Superliga	16	2	0	0	0	0	16	2
Silkeborg	Total		41	7	0	0	0	0	41	7
Career total			121	29	7	2	0	0	128	31
