= Johan Blomberg =

Swedish footballer

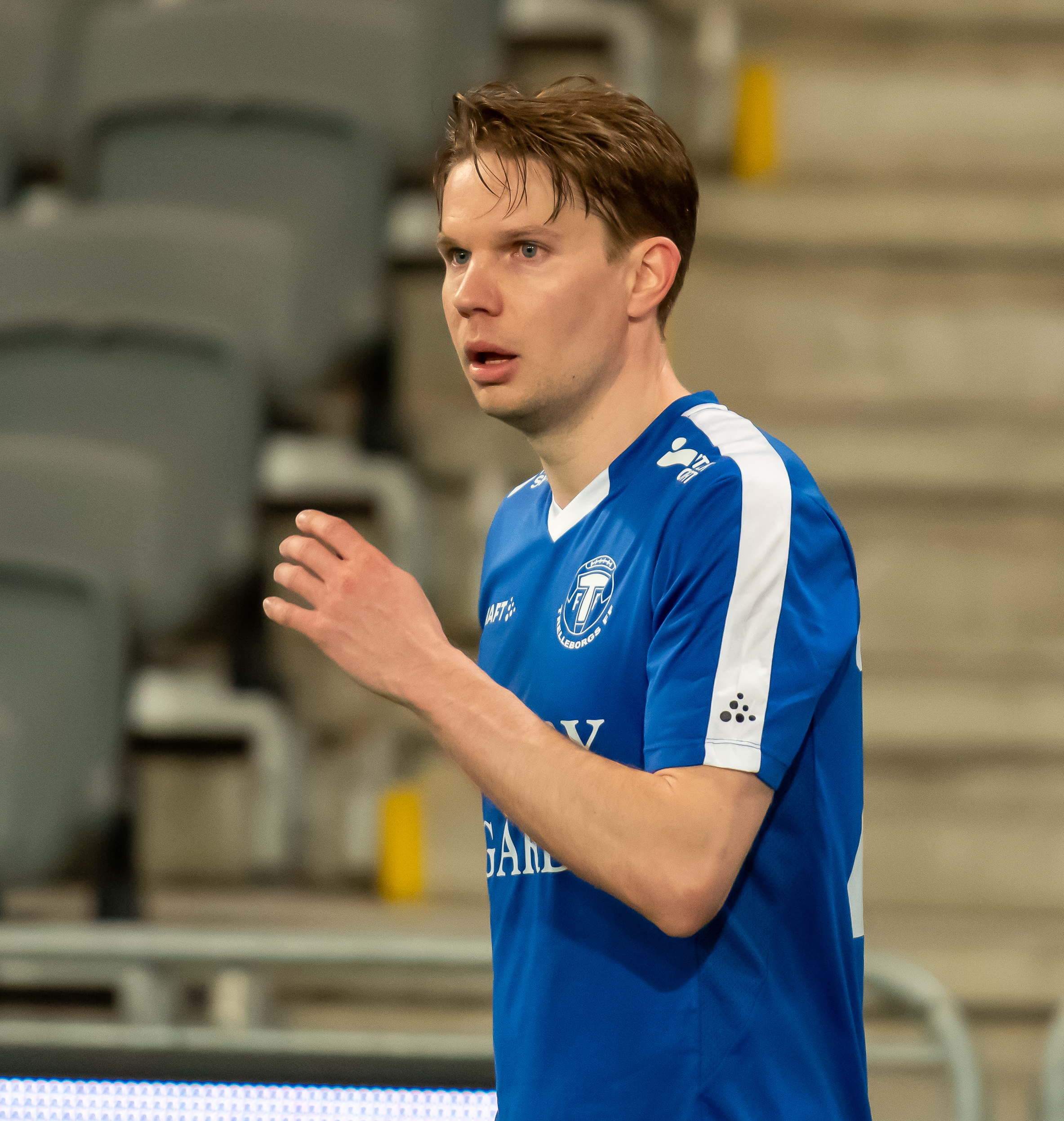

Personal information
- Full name: Johan Lars Blomberg
- Date of birth: 14 June 1987 (age 39)
- Place of birth: Lund, Sweden
- Height: 1.77 m (5 ft 10 in)
- Position: Right midfielder

Youth career
- 1993–2006: Lunds BK

Senior career*
Years	Team	Apps	(Gls)
2007–2008	Lunds BK	20+	(6+)
2009–2011	Ängelholms FF	47	(1)
2012–2014	Halmstads BK	88	(13)
2015–2017	AIK	78	(9)
2018–2019	Colorado Rapids	27	(0)
2019	→ GIF Sundsvall (loan)	11	(3)
2020	GIF Sundsvall	28	(6)
2021–2022	Trelleborg	54	(2)
- * Club domestic league appearances and goals as of 2 June 2023

Johan Lars Blomberg (born 14 June 1987) is a Swedish professional footballer who plays as a right midfielder.

== Club career ==
Blomberg joined Colorado Rapids in November 2017.

On 31 January 2021, Blomberg signed a two-year contract with Trelleborg.

== Career statistics ==
As of 12 June 2019

Club	Season	League			Cup (Note: Includes the Svenska Cupen and U.S. Open Cup)		Continental		Other		Total	
Club	Season	Division	Apps	Goals	Apps	Goals	Apps	Goals	Apps	Goals	Apps	Goals
Ängelholms FF	2009	Superettan	7	0	0	0	–		–		7	0
Ängelholms FF	2010	Superettan	17	1	3	0	–		–		20	1
Ängelholms FF	2011	Superettan	23	0	1	0	–		2 (Note: Appearances in the Superettan promotion play-offs)	1	26	1
Ängelholms FF	Total		47	1	4	0	0	0	2	1	53	2
Halmstads BK	2012	Superettan	29	2	1	0	–		2	0	32	2
Halmstads BK	2013	Allsvenskan	29	4	4	0	–		2 (Note: Appearances in the Allsvenskan relegation play-offs)	0	35	4
Halmstads BK	2014	Allsvenskan	30	7	3	1	–		—		33	8
Halmstads BK	Total		88	13	8	1	0	0	4	0	100	14
AIK	2015	Allsvenskan	29	6	4	0	6 (Note: Appearances in the UEFA Europa League)	0	–		39	6
AIK	2016	Allsvenskan	21	0	4	0	6	0	–		31	0
AIK	2017	Allsvenskan	28	3	5	1	5	0	–		38	4
AIK	Total		78	9	13	1	17	0	0	0	108	10
Colorado Rapids	2018	MLS	24	0	1	0	1 (Note: Appearance in the CONCACAF Champions League)	0	–		26	0
Colorado Rapids	2019	MLS	3	0	1	0	–		0	0	4	0
Colorado Rapids	Total		27	0	2	0	1	0	0	0	30	0
GIF Sundsvall (loan)	2019	Allsvenskan	0	0	0	0	–		–		0	0
Career total			240	23	27	2	18	0	6	1	291	26
