= Tobias Carlsson =

Tobias Carlsson may refer to:

- Tobias Carlsson (footballer, born 1975)
- Tobias Carlsson (footballer, born 1995)

== See also ==
- Tobias Karlsson (disambiguation)
