= Dardan Mustafa =

German-born Swedish footballer

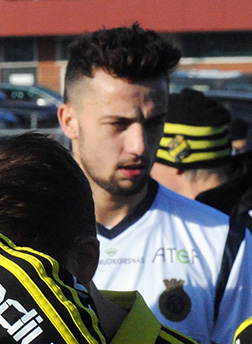

Personal information
- Full name: Dardan Mustafa
- Date of birth: 5 February 1992 (age 34)
- Place of birth: Hamburg, Germany
- Height: 1.88 m (6 ft 2 in)
- Position: Forward

Team information
- Current team: Österlen FF

Youth career
- Breitenfelder SV
- IFK Värnamo
- –2008: Lunds BK

Senior career*
Years	Team	Apps	(Gls)
2008–2013	Lunds BK	52	(12)
2014–2015	Gefle IF	37	(1)
2016–2017	Örgryte IS	13	(1)
2017	Assyriska BK	7	(4)
2018–2019	Åtvidabergs FF	47	(17)
2020	Torns IF	19	(9)
2021	Lunds BK	17	(3)
2021–2022	Rotonda Calcio	11	(0)
2022–	Österlen FF	0	(0)
- * Club domestic league appearances and goals as of 20:22, 30 September 2020 (UTC)

Dardan Mustafa (born 5 February 1992) is a German footballer who plays for Österlen FF as a forward.
