= Snöstorp Nyhem FF =

Swedish football club

- Full name: Snöstorp Nyhem Fotbollförening
- Ground: Snöstorps IP; Halmstad; Sweden
- Chairman: Leif Nilsson
- Head coach: Aki Gouliaveras
- Coach: Jonas Magnusson
- League: Division 4 Halland Elit
Home colours	Away colours

Snöstorp Nyhem FF is a Swedish football club located in Halmstad.

== Background ==
Snöstorp Nyhem FF currently plays in Division 3 Halland Elit which is the fifth tier of Swedish football. They play their home matches at the Snöstorps IP in Halmstad.

The club is affiliated to Hallands Fotbollförbund. Snöstorp Nyhem FF have competed in the Svenska Cupen on 21 occasions and have played 43 matches in the competition.

== Season to season ==
Season	Level	Division	Section	Position	Movements
1997	Tier 5	Division 4	Halland	4th	
1998	Tier 5	Division 4	Halland	8th	
1999	Tier 5	Division 4	Halland	9th	
2000	Tier 5	Division 4	Halland	5th	
2001	Tier 5	Division 4	Halland	3rd	
2002	Tier 5	Division 4	Halland	2nd	Promotion Playoffs
2003	Tier 5	Division 4	Halland	1st	Promoted
2004	Tier 4	Division 3	Sydvästra Götaland	5th	
2005	Tier 4	Division 3	Sydvästra Götaland	9th	
2006*	Tier 5	Division 3	Sydvästra Götaland	4th	
2007	Tier 5	Division 3	Sydvästra Götaland	9th	Relegation Playoffs – Relegated
2008	Tier 6a	Division 4	Halland Elit	10th	
2009	Tier 6a	Division 4	Halland Elit	1st	Promoted
2010	Tier 5	Division 3	Sydvästra Götaland	10th	Relegated
2011	Tier 6a	Division 4	Halland Elit	2nd	Promotion Playoffs

* League restructuring in 2006 resulted in a new division being created at Tier 3 and subsequent divisions dropping a level.
