= Oliver Silverholt =

Swedish footballer

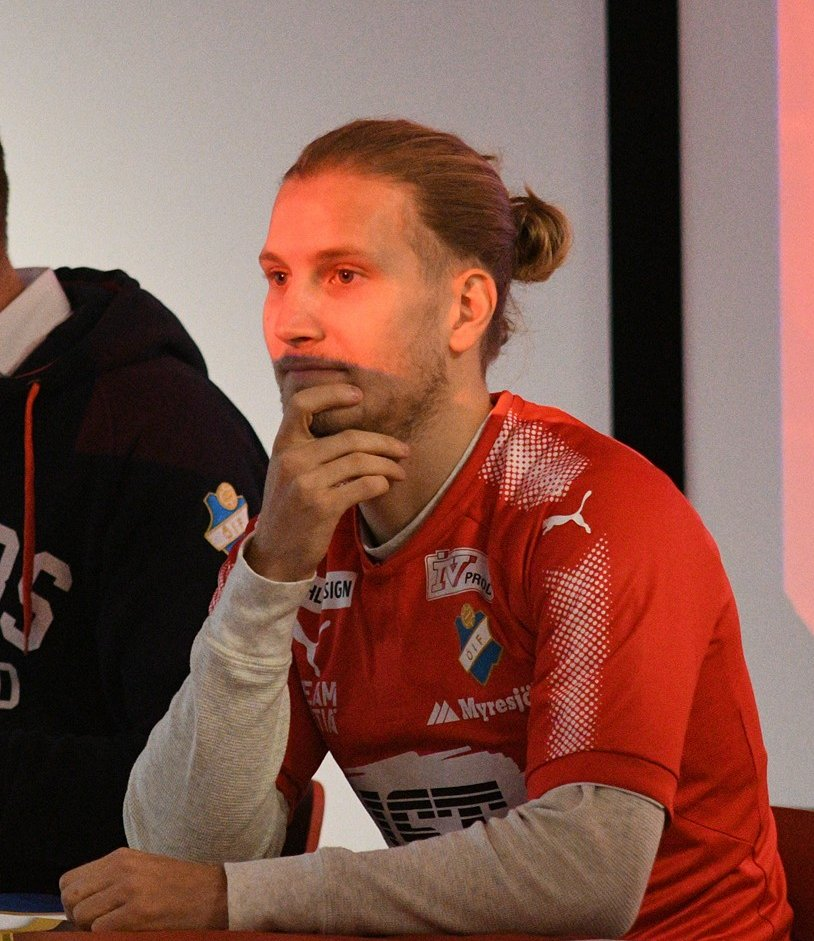
- Silverholt in December 2017

Personal information
- Full name: Oliver Montana Silverholt
- Date of birth: 22 June 1994 (age 32)
- Place of birth: Sweden
- Height: 1.77 m (5 ft 9 1/2 in)
- Position: Right midfielder

Team information
- Current team: Europa Point
- Number: 24

Youth career
- –2010: BK Astrio
- 2010–2012: Halmstads BK

Senior career*
Years	Team	Apps	(Gls)
2012–2014	Halmstads BK	47	(0)
2015–2017	Hammarby IF	16	(0)
2017	→ Varbergs BoIS (loan)	21	(3)
2018–2022	Östers IF	119	(0)
2023–2026	Varbergs BoIS	36	(0)
2024	→ Falkenbergs FF (loan)	11	(0)
2026–	Europa Point	9	(0)

International career
2012–2014	Sweden U19	7	(0)
2013	Sweden U21	4	(0)
- * Club domestic league appearances and goals as of 20 November 2026

Oliver Montana Silverholt (born 22 June 1994) is a Swedish footballer who plays for Europa Point. He preferably plays as a right midfielder.

== Career ==
He began playing football at the local club BK Astrio at a young age. In 2010, at age 16, he joined Halmstads BK where he continued to play youth football for another couple of years. He made his senior competitive debut for Halmstad in 2012 in an away fixture against Umeå FC in Superettan. The club won promotion to Allsvenskan the same season, where Silverholt went on to play another two full years as a frequent starter. In total he featured in 47 games for Halmstad.

Before the 2015 season, he signed a three-year contract with newly promoted Hammarby IF from Stockholm as a Bosman. There, he linked up with his former youth coach Mats Jingblad, now the general manager at Hammarby.

He went on to make 15 appearances for Hammarby in 2015. In 2016, Silverholt however struggled with fitness due to injuries and thus only featured in one competitive game for the side.

On 1 March 2017, he went on a season long loan to Varbergs BoIS in Superettan.

In July 2024, Silverholt was loaned out from Varbergs BoIS to Falkenbergs FF until December 2024.

== Personal ==
He is the younger brother of Simon Silverholt, who also is a professional football player representing Halmstad BK.

Silverholt is a supporter of FC Barcelona, citing Argentinian Lionel Messi as his favourite player.
