= Yousef Fakhro =

Association football player (born 1983)

Personal information
- Date of birth: 3 May 1983 (age 43)
- Place of birth: Germany
- Height: 1.84 m (6 ft 0 in)
- Position: Defender

Youth career
- 1989–2001: Trelleborgs FF

Senior career*
Years	Team	Apps	(Gls)
2002–2012	Trelleborgs FF	115	(5)
2013–2014	FC Höllviken	35	(1)
2015	IFK Trelleborg	19	(1)
2016–2017	MF Pelister	18	(3)
Total		187	(10)
- * Club domestic league appearances and goals

Yousef Fakhro (Arabic: يوسف فخرو; born 3 May 1983) is a former professional footballer who played as a defender. Fakhro was called up to represent Sweden internationally at under-21 level, and Lebanon at senior level thanks to his origins.

== Club career ==
Born in Germany, Fakhro joined Trelleborgs FF's youth academy aged six. His debut for the senior team came in the 2002 Superettan, against Ängelholms FF. Fakhro has scored one goal in the Allsvenskan throughout his career, in an away match against Gefle IF. He played 115 league matches in 10 years for Trelleborgs FF, scoring five times.

On 1 March 2013, Fakhro signed for FC Höllviken. In December 2014, he signed for IFK Trelleborg. In the 2016 season, Fakhro signed for Division 5 side MP Pelister, where he played 15 games and scored twice in his first season. The following season, in Division 4, he scored once in three league games.

== International career ==
Fakhro was once called up to the Sweden national under-21 team.

Thanks to his Lebanese origins, Fakhro was called up to play for the Lebanon national team in 2008. He was called up a second time in January 2012, for a training camp before a match against Iraq.

== Personal life ==
Fakhro is married to a German woman of Lebanese descent.
