= Jesper Svensson (footballer) =

Swedish footballer (born 1990)

Personal information
- Full name: Carl Jesper Svensson
- Date of birth: 6 March 1990 (age 36)
- Place of birth: Jönköping, Sweden
- Height: 1.84 m (6 ft 0 in)
- Position: Midfielder

Senior career*
Years	Team	Apps	(Gls)
2009–2021	Jönköpings Södra	295	(16)
2010	→ Husqvarna FF (loan)	12	(1)
- * Club domestic league appearances and goals as of 27 November 2021

Jesper Svensson (Swedish: [ˈjɛ̌sːpɛr svɛnsɔn]; born 6 March 1990) is a Swedish footballer.
