= Anders Grimberg =

Swedish footballer and manager

Personal information
- Date of birth: 28 August 1960 (age 66)
- Position: Forward

Team information
- Current team: FC Höllviken (manager)

Senior career*
Years	Team	Apps	(Gls)
1980	Malmö FF	1	(0)

Managerial career
- 1997: IFK Trelleborg
- 1998: Stavsten/Ymor FK
- 2000–2001: Trelleborgs FF (assistant)
- 2002: Limhamns IF
- 2002–2004: Trelleborgs FF
- 2004–2007: IFK Malmö
- 2008: LB07
- 2010: IFK Malmö
- 2010–2012: IFK Klagshamn
- 2012–2013: Trelleborgs FF
- 2014–2016: FC Höllviken
- 2016–2017: FC Rosengård
- 2020: Lunds BK
- 2022: Torns IF
- 2023–: FC Höllviken
- * Club domestic league appearances and goals

Anders Grimberg is a Swedish football manager and former player who played as a forward. He played one match for Malmö FF in 1980. Grimberg later became a manager.
