= Patrik Larsson =

Swedish footballer

Personal information
- Date of birth: 21 December 1970 (age 55)
- Position: Midfielder

Senior career*
| Years | Team | Apps | (Gls) |
| 1988–1989 | BK Olympic | | |
| 1991–2000 | Trelleborgs FF | | |
| 2001–2002 | IFK Malmö | | |
- * Club domestic league appearances and goals

Patrik Larsson (born 21 December 1970) is a Swedish retired football midfielder.
