= Alf Westerberg =

Swedish football manager

Personal information
- Full name: Alf Ingemar Westerberg
- Date of birth: 15 November 1960 (age 65)
- Place of birth: Sweden

Youth career
- IFK Trelleborg

Senior career*
Years	Team	Apps	(Gls)
- IFK Trelleborg
- IFK Borgholm

Managerial career
- 1990: Kalmar FF (assistant)
- 1991–1992: Kalmar FF
- 1993–1995: Nybro IF
- 1996–1997: Färjestadens GoIF
- 1999–2000: Trelleborgs FF
- 2001–2002: Trelleborgs FF
- 2003–2007: Malmö FF (assistant)
- 2008–2011: Trelleborgs FF (assistant)
- 2012: Trelleborgs FF
- 2015–2017: IFK Göteborg (assistant)
- 2017: IFK Göteborg
- 2018: IFK Göteborg (assistant)
- 2021: Mjällby AIF (assistant)
- * Club domestic league appearances and goals

Alf Westerberg (born 15 November 1960) is a Swedish football manager.
