= David Svensson (footballer, born 1984) =

Swedish footballer

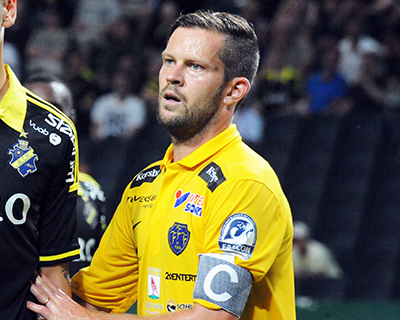

Personal information
- Full name: Karl David Svensson
- Date of birth: 9 April 1984 (age 42)
- Place of birth: Falkenberg, Sweden
- Height: 1.79 m (5 ft 10 1/2 in)
- Position: Midfielder

Youth career
- Falkenbergs FF

Senior career*
Years	Team	Apps	(Gls)
2003–2017	Falkenbergs FF	413	(39)
- * Club domestic league appearances and goals

Karl David Svensson (born 9 April 1984) is a Swedish retired footballer who played as a midfielder.

He represented Falkenbergs FF throughout the whole career as a one-club man and served as the team captain.
