= Freddy Söderberg =

Swedish footballer

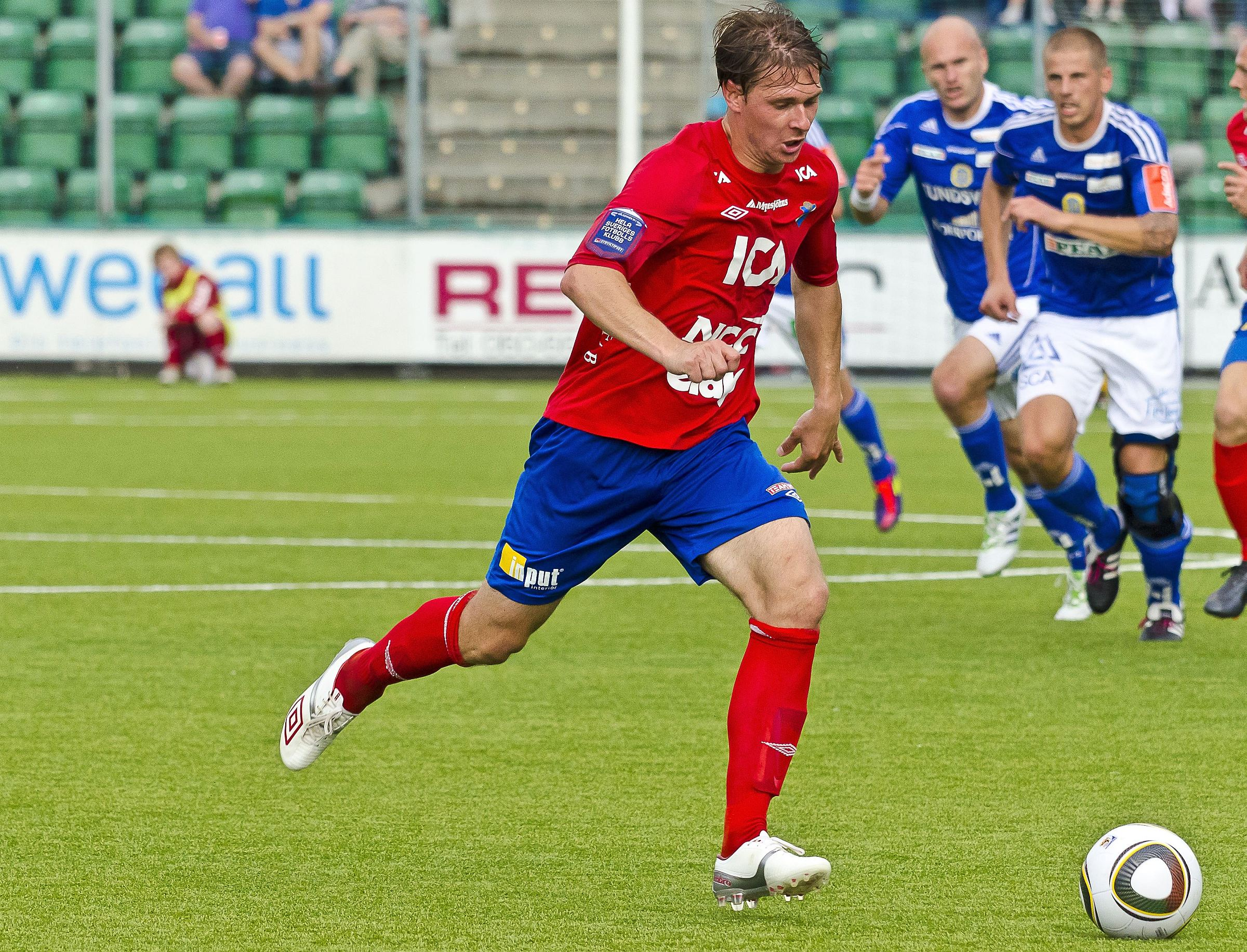

Personal information
- Date of birth: 8 November 1984 (age 42)
- Place of birth: Värnamo, Sweden
- Height: 1.86 m (6 ft 1 in)
- Position: Striker

Youth career
- 1990–2001: Bors SK

Senior career*
Years	Team	Apps	(Gls)
2001–2003	IFK Värnamo	56	(16)
2004–2005	Östers IF	39	(6)
2005	→ Myresjö IF (loan)	17	(8)
2006–2007	IFK Värnamo	44	(36)
2008–2010	Hammarby IF	43	(3)
2010	Hammarby Talang FF	7	(3)
2011–2016	Östers IF	147	(38)
- * Club domestic league appearances and goals as of 24 June 2016

Freddy Söderberg (born 8 November 1984) is a Swedish football striker who is currently free agent.

After a hard start in "Bajen" he finally scored two goals in a homegame versus Ljungskile SK on the 3 August 2008. The game ended 2-2. Söderberg scored the 2-2 goal for Hammarby in the games last minute.

Söderbergs contract is ended after the 2010 season. In 2011, he signed with his former club Östers IF, and after his return to Öster he scored ten goals in his first season back.
