= Anton Tideman =

Swedish footballer

Personal information
- Date of birth: 2 September 1992 (age 34)
- Place of birth: Sweden
- Height: 1.88 m (6 ft 2 in)
- Position: Left back

Youth career
- 1996–2008: Laholms FK

Senior career*
Years	Team	Apps	(Gls)
2010–2011	Laholms FK	39	(3)
2012–2013	Halmstads BK	0	(0)
2013	IK Oddevold	11	(0)
2014	Ljungskile SK	11	(0)
2015	Varbergs BoIS	29	(0)
2016–2022	Trelleborgs FF	170	(2)
- * Club domestic league appearances and goals as of 5 November 2022

Anton Tideman (born 2 September 1992) is a Swedish footballer.

== Career ==
Tideman started playing football in Laholms FK at the age of 4. He made his debut for the first team at the age of 16 in the Swedish 2nd Division. In 2011, he then joined Halmstads BK. He was the team captain of the club's U21 team in 2012.
