= Liridon Selmani =

Albanian footballer

Personal information
- Full name: Liridon Selmani
- Date of birth: 12 June 1992 (age 34)
- Place of birth: Kosovo, FR Yugoslavia
- Height: 1.81 m (5 ft 11 in)
- Position: Forward

Team information
- Current team: Andersbergs IK

Senior career*
Years	Team	Apps	(Gls)
2011–2013	Halmstads BK	4	(0)
2013	IK Oddevold	9	(5)
2014	Østsiden IL	11	(10)
2014–2015	IK Oddevold	20	(9)
2015–2016	IS Halmia	12	(8)
2016–2017	Varbergs BoIS	0	(0)
2017–2019	Østsiden IL	41	(28)
2019–2020	Karlstad BK	34	(17)
2020	Dalkurd FF	13	(3)
2021–	Andersbergs IK	10	(18)

International career
2012–2013	Albania U21	1	(0)
- * Club domestic league appearances and goals as of 3 September 2021

Liridon Selmani (born 12 June 1992) is an Albanian footballer, who plays for Andersbergs IK as a forward.

Selmani has been part of Albania U21 starting in 2012.
