= Aleksandar Kitić =

Bosnia and Herzegovina footballer

Personal information
- Full name: Aleksandar Kitić
- Date of birth: 26 August 1983 (age 43)
- Place of birth: SR Bosnia and Herzegovina, SFR Yugoslavia
- Height: 1.84 m (6 ft 0 in)
- Position: Midfielder

Youth career
- Kozara Gradiška

Senior career*
| Years | Team | Apps | (Gls) |
| 2001–2004 | Radnik Bijeljina | 65 | (1) |
| 2004–2005 | Kozara Gradiška | 28 | (0) |
| 2005–2021 | Ljungskile SK | 366 | (18) |

Managerial career
- 2018: Ljungskile SK (player-manager)
- * Club domestic league appearances and goals as of 4 August 2019

Aleksandar Kitić (born 26 August 1983) is a Bosnian-Herzegovinian former footballer who played most of his career for the Swedish football club Ljungskile SK as a midfielder.
