= Joakim Wrele =

Swedish footballer (born 1991)

Personal information
- Date of birth: 7 January 1991 (age 35)
- Place of birth: Sweden
- Height: 1.84 m (6 ft 1/2 in)
- Position: Midfielder

Team information
- Current team: Hødd
- Number: 6

Youth career
- BK Astrio

Senior career*
Years	Team	Apps	(Gls)
2010–2014	Halmstads BK	10	(0)
2013	→ ÍA (loan)	19	(1)
2014	→ Hødd (loan)	25	(0)
2015–2017	Hødd	52	(3)
2017	Levanger	24	(1)
2018–	Hødd	40	(2)
- * Club domestic league appearances and goals as of 4 September 2019

Joakim Wrele (born 7 January 1991) is a Swedish footballer who plays for as a midfielder for IL Hødd.
