= Peter Nyström =

Swedish footballer (born 1984)

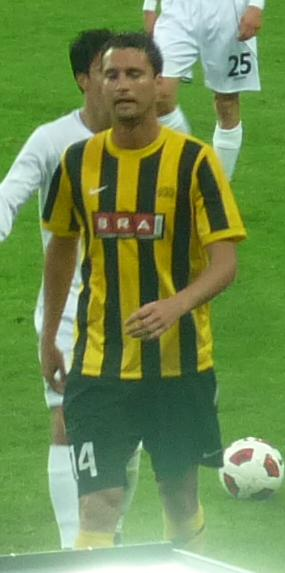
- Peter Nyström in BK Häcken 2011

Personal information
- Full name: Peter Nyström
- Date of birth: 27 August 1984 (age 42)
- Place of birth: Sweden
- Height: 1.95 m (6 ft 5 in)
- Position: Midfielder

Youth career
- Kungsladugårds BK

Senior career*
Years	Team	Apps	(Gls)
2001–2006	Västra Frölunda	70	(6)
2007	Sogndal	13	(0)
2008–2011	BK Häcken	61	(5)
2012–2013	Halmstads BK	33	(2)
2014	IK Oddevold	20	(4)
2015–2017	Varbergs BoIS	76	(4)

International career
2001	Sweden U17	2	(0)
- * Club domestic league appearances and goals as of 8 February 2018

Peter Nyström (born 27 August 1984) is a Swedish footballer, who plays professionally as a midfielder. He last played for Varbergs BoIS.

== Career ==
Peter Nyström started his career in Kungsladugårds BK, before moving to Västra Frölunda IF in 2001, then in Superettan. He stayed with the club until 2005, he chose not to follow Frölunda down to Division 1 as the club was relegated, he instead signed for Norwegian club Sogndal Fotball. His time in Norway was short, as he returned in 2008 to Sweden and Superettan, this time however to BK Häcken. He helped the club get promoted to Allsvenskan, but got his 2010 season ruined by a ruptured achilles tendon, with limited playing time during the 2011 season he decided to leave the club and join newly relegated Halmstads BK.
