= Ardian Rexhepi =

Swedish footballer

Personal information
- Date of birth: 16 August 1993 (age 33)
- Place of birth: Sweden
- Height: 1.70 m (5 ft 7 in)
- Position: Midfielder

Youth career
- –2006: Hyltebruks IF
- 2006–2010: Halmstads BK

Senior career*
Years	Team	Apps	(Gls)
2011–2012	Halmstads BK	5	(0)
2013–2015	Varbergs BoIS	49	(10)
2015–2017	Ängelholms FF	23	(3)
2017	Notodden	11	(0)
2017	IK Brage	10	(1)

International career
2011	Sweden U19	2	(0)
- * Club domestic league appearances and goals as of 30 March 2018

Ardian Rexhepi (born 16 August 1993) is a Swedish footballer who most recently played for IK Brage as a midfielder.

== Career ==
Starting his career in Hyltebruks IF, he moved to Halmstads BK youth system in 2006. He played in several youth competitions for the club and during his participation in Gothia Cup he was spotted by scouts from Atalanta and was invited for a trial, however failed to gain a contract.

Returning to Halmstads BK, new coach Josep Clotet Ruiz had him participate in several pre-season matches before elevating him to the senior team prior the start of the season, eventually making his league debut against BK Häcken on 21 June 2011.
