= Antonio Rojas (Paraguayan footballer) =

Paraguayan footballer (born 1984)

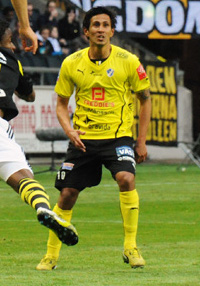

Personal information
- Full name: Antonio Agustín Rojas Giménez
- Date of birth: 27 March 1984 (age 42)
- Place of birth: Paraguay
- Height: 1.74 m (5 ft 9 in)
- Position: Midfielder

Team information
- Current team: IK Wormo

Youth career
- Cerro Porteño

Senior career*
Years	Team	Apps	(Gls)
–2003	Cerro Porteño		
2004–2005	Helsingør IF		
2005	Hellerup IK		
2006	Lunds BK		
2007–2011	Ängelholms FF	91	(9)
2012–2016	Halmstads BK	135	(12)
2017	Kristianstad FC	9	(0)
2018–	IK Wormo	?	(?)
- * Club domestic league appearances and goals as of 21 May 2018

Antonio Rojas (born March 27, 1984) is a Paraguayan footballer, who currently plays for IK Wormo as a midfielder.

== Career ==
Antonio Rojas started his career in Paraguayan club Club Cerro Porteño before his cousin Tim had Rojas come and play with him in Denmark Series side Helsingør IF. After that he spent a short period in Hellerup IK before moving to Sweden and Division 2 Mellersta Götaland club Lunds BK. His time with the team was again short as he left after the first season for Ängelholms FF in Division 1 Södra where he helped the club get promoted to second tier Superettan the following year. In the summer of 2010 he suffered a knee injury which forced him to have an operation that caused him to miss the rest of the season.

Rojas returned from injury for the 2011 season where he helped the team reach third place which meant a promotion playoff to Allsvenskan against Allsvenskan 14th placed team Syrianska FC. An injury prevented him from participating in the matches. Ängelholm won the first game 2-1, but Syrianska won the return leg with 3-1 and remained in Allsvenskan. At half-time newly relegated Halmstads BK announced that they had signed Antonio Rojas.

In 2011, he established himself as a vital playmaker on the midfield and a penalty taker. When Rojas signed for Halmstads BK, he stated he would play in Allsvenskan with Halmstad either 2013 or 2014. In his first season with the club Halmstad missed out on the top two automatic promotion positions and ended up in third place which meant another promotion playoff. Through their 6-4 aggregate victory against GIF Sundsvall they were able to return to Allsvenskan.
