= Hyltebruks IF =

Swedish football club

- Full name: Hyltebruks Idrottsförening
- Founded: 1922
- Ground: Örnvallen; Hyltebruk; Sweden
- Chairman: Rune Gunnarsson
- Head coach: Stuart Hiscock; Tommy Samuelsson
- League: Division 4 Halland Elit
Home colours	Away colours

Hyltebruks IF is a Swedish football club located in Hyltebruk.

== Background ==
Hyltebruks IF currently plays in Division 4 Halland Elit which is the sixth tier of Swedish football. They play their home matches at Örnvallen in Hyltebruk. In the 1930s, the club also played bandy. The club is affiliated to Hallands Fotbollförbund.
