= Kristoffer Thydell =

Swedish footballer (born 1993)

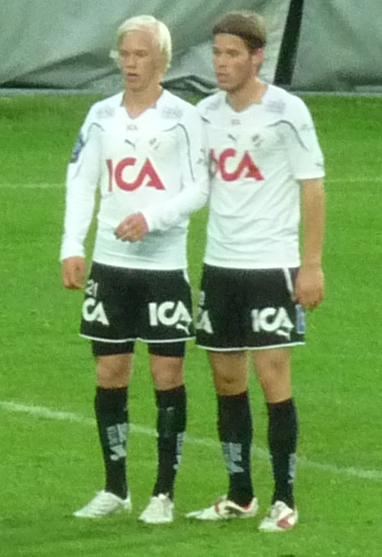
- Kristoffer Thydell (left).

Personal information
- Full name: Kristoffer Thydell
- Date of birth: 17 March 1993 (age 33)
- Place of birth: Sweden
- Height: 1.79 m (5 ft 10 in)
- Position: Midfielder

Team information
- Current team: Snöstorp Nyhem FF

Youth career
- 1999–2008: Snöstorp Nyhem FF
- 2009–2010: Halmstads BK

Senior career*
| Years | Team | Apps | (Gls) |
| 2010–2014 | Halmstads BK | 51 | (0) |
| 2014 | → Husqvarna FF (loan) | 13 | (0) |
| 2015–2016 | Piteå IF | 35 | (4) |
| 2017 | Carlstad United | 22 | (1) |
| 2018– | Snöstorp Nyhem FF | 0 | (0) |

International career^{‡}
| 2008–2010 | Sweden U17 | 15 | (0) |
| 2011–2012 | Sweden U19 | 9 | (0) |
- * Club domestic league appearances and goals as of 30 March 2018 ‡ National team caps and goals as of 16:48, 7 September 2012 (UTC)

Kristoffer Thydell (born 17 April 1993) is a Swedish footballer who plays for as a midfielder for Snöstorp Nyhem FF.

== Career ==
Starting his career in Snöstorp Nyhem FF at the age of 6, he stayed with the club until the spring of 2009, when he then signed for local rivals Halmstads BK. First playing for the youth team he was then moved up to the reserve team in 2010 and shortly thereafter he made his debut for the senior team, coming on as a substitute in a friendly match against Kosovo on 10 June 2010. He made his league debut against IF Elfsborg on 8 August 2010.

== Personal life ==
Kristoffers grandfather, Lars-Christer Thydell, played for Halmstads BK in the early 1960s in Division 2, he then played under the name Lars-Christer Johansson. He has 3 siblings, Markus (born 1991), Lukas (1997), and Emilia (2000) who all plays for Snöstorp Nyhem FF.
