= Stojan Lukić =

Swedish and Bosnian former footballer (born 1979)

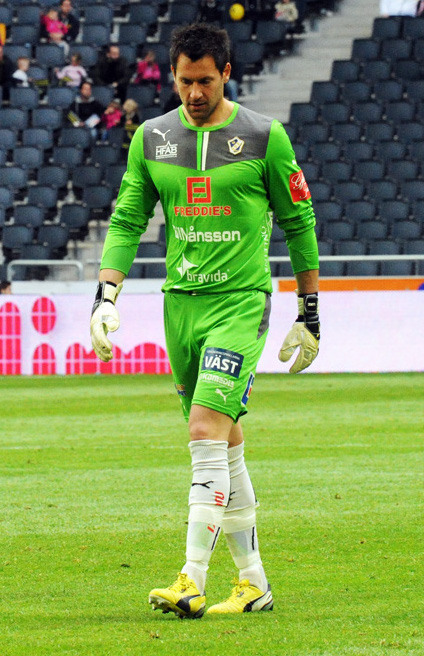

Personal information
- Date of birth: 28 December 1979 (age 46)
- Place of birth: Stockholm, Sweden
- Height: 1.93 m (6 ft 4 in)
- Position: Goalkeeper

Youth career
- Västerhaninge IF
- IF Leikin

Senior career*
| Years | Team | Apps | (Gls) |
| 1998 | IF Leikin | | |
| 1999–2003 | IS Halmia | | |
| 2004–2005 | Högaborgs BK | | |
| 2006 | Landskrona BoIS | 1 | (0) |
| 2007 | Assyriska FF | 25 | (0) |
| 2008–2012 | Falkenbergs FF | 146 | (0) |
| 2013–2016 | Halmstads BK | 119 | (0) |
| 2017–2019 | Örgryte IS | 61 | (0) |
| 2020–2024 | Varbergs BoIS | 55 | (0) |

Managerial career
- 2019: Örgryte IS (player-assistant)
- * Club domestic league appearances and goals as of 15 November 2023

Stojan Lukić (born 28 December 1979) is a Swedish and Bosnian former footballer who played as a goalkeeper.

== Career ==
Lukić grew up in Stockholm but relocated with his family to Halmstad at the age of 15. There he started out at local lower division side IF Leikin before eventually signing with another Halmstad based club, IS Halmia.

After shorter stints with Scania based clubs Högaborgs BK and Landskrona BoIS Lukić joined third tier Assyriska FF for the 2007 season. Even though he was the starting keeper and Assyriska won promotion Lukić decided to end his two-year contract prematurely as he was unable to settle in Södertälje.

He moved back home to Halmstad from where he was able to commute to nearby Falkenberg, home to second tier Superettan club Falkenbergs FF. There he impressed right away by having the second best save percentage in the league that season. After five years with Falkenberg he finally got the chance to play at the highest Swedish level Allsvenskan when he signed for Halmstads BK before the 2013 season started.

On 4 January 2019 it was announced, that Lukić would continue at Örgryte IS as an assistant manager under manager Thomas Askebrand. However, Lukić would still continue to be registered as a player. Lukić left Örgryte at the end of 2019 and joined Varbergs BoIS in February 2020 on a one-year deal.

He announced his retirement from football in October 2023.

== Personal life ==
Lukić was born in Stockholm to Serb parents. His family moved to Halmstad when he was 15 years old.
