= Simon Silverholt =

Swedish footballer

Personal information
- Full name: Simon Texas Silverholt
- Date of birth: 17 June 1993 (age 33)
- Place of birth: Sweden
- Height: 1.80 m (5 ft 11 in)
- Position: Winger

Team information
- Current team: Europa Point
- Number: 17

Youth career
- Halmstads BK

Senior career*
Years	Team	Apps	(Gls)
2013–2017	Halmstads BK	31	(4)
2017	GAIS	11	(3)
2018–2019	IFK Mariehamn	44	(9)
2020	IL Hødd	16	(1)
2021	Tvååkers IF	11	(2)
2024–	Europa Point	7	(0)
- * Club domestic league appearances and goals as of 22:00, 12 January 2025 (UTC)

Simon Texas Silverholt (born 17 June 1993) is a Swedish professional footballer who plays as a winger for Gibraltar Football League side Europa Point.

== Career ==
In June 2024 he signed for Europa Point.
