= Kristoffer Fagercrantz =

Swedish footballer (born 1986)

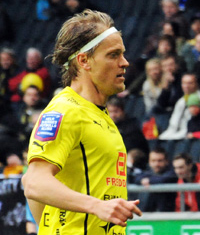

Personal information
- Full name: Kristoffer Mats Fagercrantz
- Date of birth: 9 October 1986 (age 40)
- Place of birth: Sweden
- Height: 1.84 m (6 ft 0 in)
- Position: Midfielder

Youth career
- –2003: IF Centern
- 2004: Halmstads BK

Senior career*
Years	Team	Apps	(Gls)
2005–2006	Halmstads BK	5	(0)
2006	→ Laholms FK (loan)		
2007–2009	Falkenbergs FF	71	(12)
2010–2011	Jönköpings Södra IF	29	(11)
2011–2012	Kalmar FF	33	(3)
2012	→ Halmstads BK (loan)	11	(3)
2013–2016	Halmstads BK	82	(2)

International career
2003	Sweden U17	2	(1)
- * Club domestic league appearances and goals

Kristoffer Fagercrantz (born 9 October 1986) is a Swedish retired footballer who played as a midfielder.

== Career ==
Starting his career in IF Centern, Fagercrantz moved to Halmstads BK in 2004, at the age of 17. He spent only one year with the youth team and in 2005 he played his first match in the Allsvenskan. He damaged his meniscus in February 2006. During the autumn of 2006, he was sent on loan to Laholms FK and the next year he went on loan to Falkenbergs FF, which he later joined for an undisclosed fee. Fagercrantz stayed with Falkenberg until the end of the 2009 Superettan, when he decided he wanted to move forward with his career and signed for league rivals Jönköpings Södra. His time in Jönköping didn't go unnoticed and he attracted the attention of Kalmar FF. After the end of the 2010 Superettan Fagercrantz left Jönköping for Kalmar, however limited playing time in Kalmar made both the club and Fagercrantz look for suitable options which resulted in him being loaned back to Halmstads BK in August 2012.
