= Fredrik Liverstam =

Swedish footballer

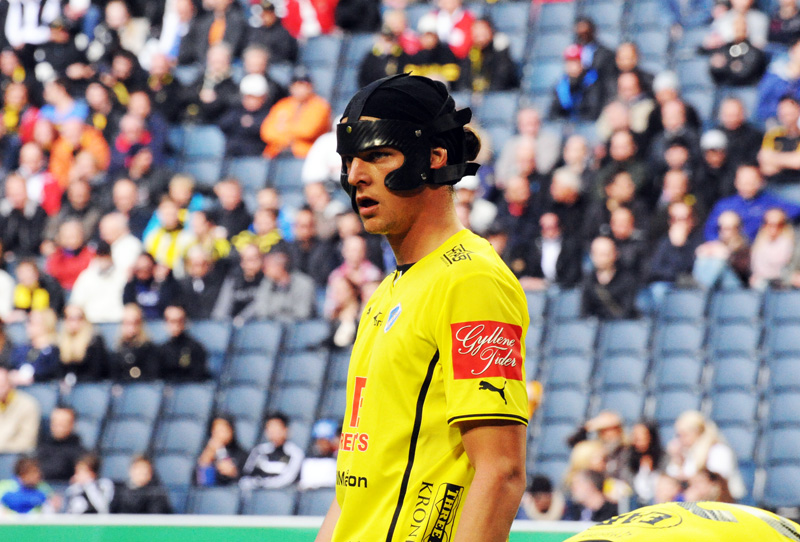

Personal information
- Full name: Dan Fredrik Liverstam
- Date of birth: 4 March 1988 (age 38)
- Place of birth: Helsingborg, Sweden
- Height: 1.94 m (6 ft 4 in)
- Position: Centre back

Team information
- Current team: Eskilsminne IF
- Number: 3

Youth career
- Rydebäcks IF
- Högaborgs BK

Senior career*
Years	Team	Apps	(Gls)
2008–2009	Högaborgs BK	31	(0)
2009–2010	Helsingborgs IF	6	(0)
2011–2012	Landskrona BoIS	51	(3)
2013–2017	Halmstads BK	129	(2)
2018–2019	Helsingborgs IF	31	(1)
2020–2021	Trelleborgs FF	41	(4)
2022–	Eskilsminne IF	55	(2)
- * Club domestic league appearances and goals as of 1 January 2025

Fredrik Liverstam (born 4 March 1988) is a Swedish footballer who plays as a defender for Eskilsminne IF.
