= Tobias Karlsson (footballer) =

Swedish footballer

Tobias Helldèn
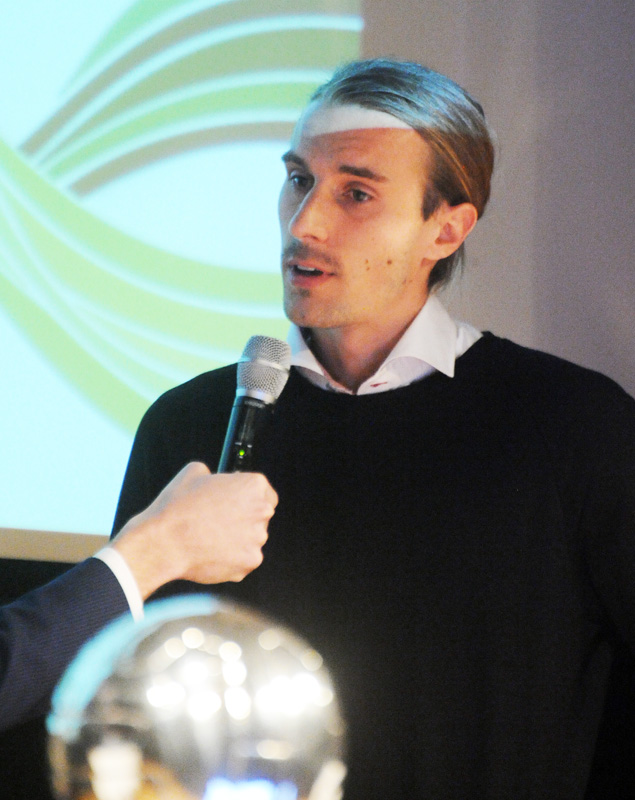

Personal information
- Full name: Erik Tobias Helldèn
- Date of birth: 14 January 1989 (age 37)
- Place of birth: Öckerö, Sweden
- Height: 1.87 m (6 ft 2 in)
- Position: Defender

Youth career
- 1995–2001: Hälsö BK
- 2002–2005: Torslanda IK
- 2006–2007: BK Häcken

Senior career*
Years	Team	Apps	(Gls)
2008–2010	Torslanda IK	45	(0)
2011–2023	Falkenbergs FF	264	(12)
- * Club domestic league appearances and goals as of 30 November 2023

Tobias Helldén (né Karlsson; born 14 January 1989) is a Swedish former professional footballer who played the majority of his career for Falkenbergs FF as a defender.
