= Viktor Ljung =

Swedish footballer (born 1991)

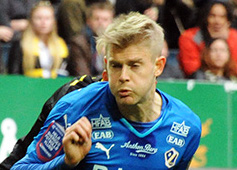

Personal information
- Full name: Per Viktor Ljung
- Date of birth: 19 April 1991 (age 35)
- Place of birth: Sweden
- Height: 1.85 m (6 ft 1 in)
- Position: Right back

Youth career
- –2010: Halmstads BK

Senior career*
Years	Team	Apps	(Gls)
2010–2015	Halmstads BK	75	(1)
2016–2017	Helsingborgs IF	11	(0)
2018	Levanger	18	(0)
2019	IFK Värnamo	26	(3)
2020–2021	Halmstads BK	0	(0)
- * Club domestic league appearances and goals as of 21 October 2020

Viktor Ljung (born 19 April 1991) is a Swedish footballer who plays as a defender.

== Career ==
=== Club career ===
Starting his career in Halmstads BK youth system, he was then called up to the senior team in 2010 prior to the match against Djurgårdens IF as Mikael Rosén had come down with sickness, he came on as a substitute in 90th minute of the match.

Ljung left Levanger FK at the end of 2018. On 14 February 2019, Ljung signed with IFK Värnamo for the rest of the season. On 30 November 2019 it was confirmed, that Ljung would return to Halmstads BK for the 2020 season, signing a deal until the end of 2021.
