= Guðjón Baldvinsson =

Icelandic footballer

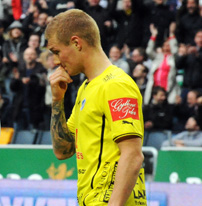

Personal information
- Date of birth: 15 February 1986 (age 40)
- Place of birth: Garðabær, Iceland
- Height: 1.84 m (6 ft 1/2 in)
- Position: Striker

Youth career
- Stjarnan

Senior career*
Years	Team	Apps	(Gls)
2003–2007	Stjarnan	66	(36)
2008	KR Reykjavík	21	(9)
2009	GAIS	5	(0)
2010–2011	KR Reykjavík	33	(18)
2012–2014	Halmstad	81	(25)
2015	FC Nordsjælland	13	(1)
2015–2020	Stjarnan	98	(34)
2018	→ Kerala Blasters (loan)	6	(1)
2021	KR Reykjavík	4	(2)

International career
2001–2002	Iceland U17	5	(0)
2006–2008	Iceland U21	8	(0)
2009–2014	Iceland	4	(0)
- * Club domestic league appearances and goals

Guðjón Baldvinsson (born 15 February 1986) is an Icelandic international former footballer who played as a striker.

== Club career ==
Born in Garðabær, Guðjón began his career in 2003 with Stjarnan. He signed for KR Reykjavík for the 2008 season, before moving to Sweden to play with GAIS in the 2009 season. He then played with KR Reykjavík, Halmstad, FC Nordsjælland and Stjarnan.

He moved on loan to Indian Super League side Kerala Blasters in January 2018.

== International career ==
Guðjón made his national team debut in March 2009.
