= Kristinn Steindórsson =

Icelandic footballer

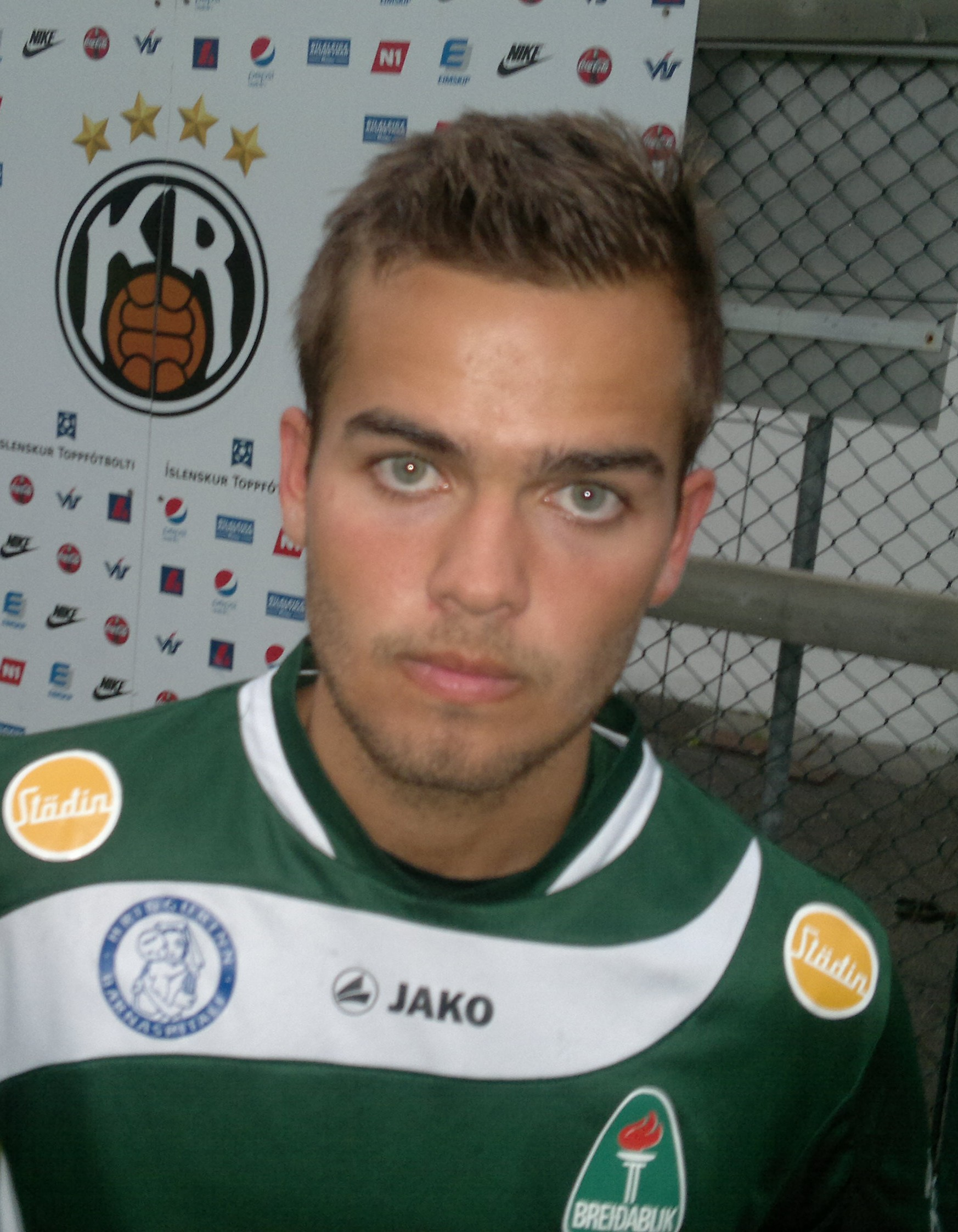
- Kristinn in 2011

Personal information
- Date of birth: 29 April 1990 (age 36)
- Place of birth: Reykjavík, Iceland
- Height: 1.78 m (5 ft 10 in)
- Position: Left midfielder

Team information
- Current team: Breiðablik
- Number: 10

Youth career
- Breiðablik

Senior career*
Years	Team	Apps	(Gls)
2007–2011	Breiðablik	83	(34)
2012–2014	Halmstads BK	77	(16)
2015	Columbus Crew	21	(0)
2016–2017	GIF Sundsvall	41	(0)
2018–2019	FH	28	(0)
2020–	Breiðablik	132	(26)

International career^{‡}
2006–2007	Iceland U17	9	(5)
2007–2008	Iceland U19	9	(0)
2009–2012	Iceland U21	9	(1)
2015–2017	Iceland	3	(2)
- * Club domestic league appearances and goals as of 1 November 2026 ‡ National team caps and goals as of 9 November 2020

Kristinn Steindórsson (born 29 April 1990) is an Icelandic professional footballer who plays for Breiðablik as a left midfielder.

== International ==
Kristinn was called up to the senior squad for the first time in January 2015 for a pair of friendlies against Canada in Florida. He scored his first goal on 16 January 2015 in a 2–1 friendly win in the first match against Canada.

=== International goals ===
Score and result list Iceland's goal tally first.

#	Date	Venue	Opponent	Score	Result	Competition
1.	16 January 2015	UCF Soccer and Track Stadium, Orlando, United States	Canada	1–0	2–1	Friendly
2.	31 January 2016	StubHub Center, Carson, United States	United States	1–0	2–3	Friendly
