= Johnny Lundberg =

Swedish footballer

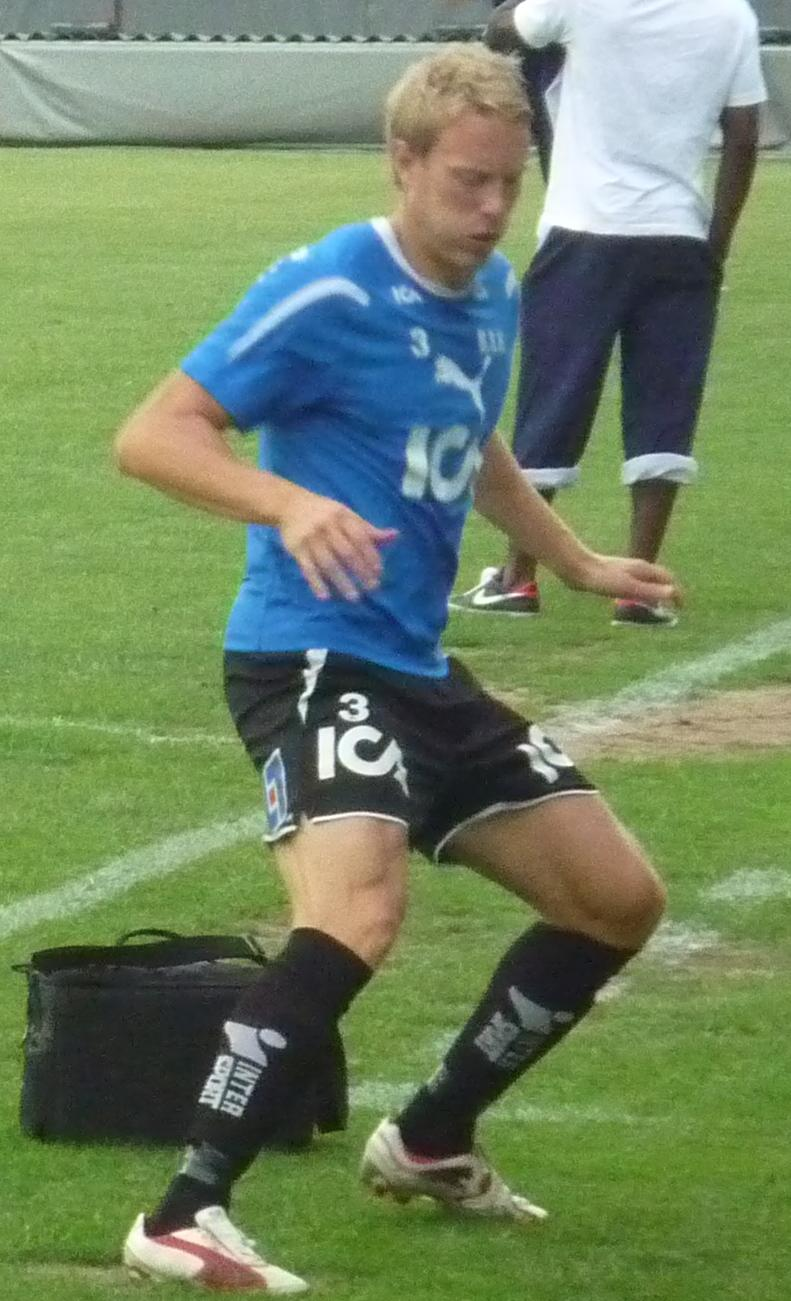
- Lundberg in 2010

Personal information
- Date of birth: 15 April 1982 (age 44)
- Place of birth: Landskrona, Sweden
- Height: 1.89 m (6 ft 2 in)
- Position: Defender

Youth career
- 1988–2000: Landskrona BoIS

Senior career*
Years	Team	Apps	(Gls)
2001–2006	Landskrona BoIS	75	(2)
2006–2009	FC Nordsjælland	80	(6)
2009–2013	Halmstads BK	70	(6)
2013	Sandnes Ulf	3	(0)
2014–2015	Landskrona BoIS	42	(0)
2016–2017	IK Wormo	22	(1)
Total		292	(15)
- * Club domestic league appearances and goals as of 10 February 2019

Johnny Lundberg (born 15 April 1982) is a Swedish former footballer who played for Landskrona BoIS, FC Nordsjælland, Halmstads BK and Sandnes Ulf as a defender.

== Career ==
Starting his career in Landskrona BoIS at the age of 6, he then made his debut for the club in 2001 in Superettan, coming on as a substitute against GIF Sundsvall. He was regular starting player during the 2004 season and followed the club back down to Superettan. In 2006, he signed for Danish Superliga club FC Nordsjælland, however he did not leave until 1 January 2007, he stayed until the summer 2009 when he signed for Swedish Allsvenska club Halmstads BK. Prior to the 2010 season Halmstads BK manager Lars Jacobsson announced that Lundberg would be the new team captain, replacing Tommy Jönsson.
