= Denis Velić =

Swedish footballer

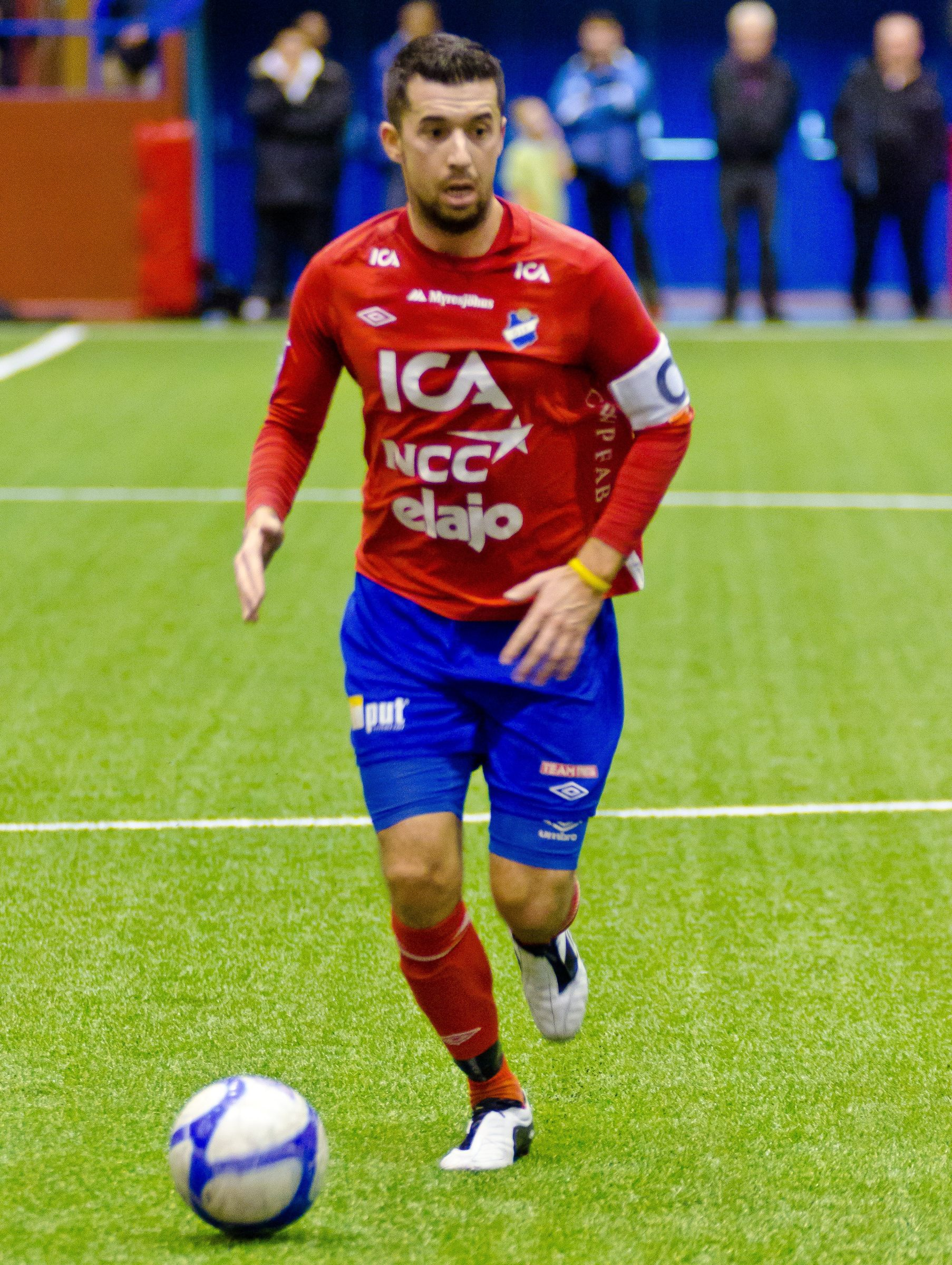

Personal information
- Date of birth: 7 October 1982 (age 44)
- Place of birth: Sweden
- Height: 1.82 m (6 ft 0 in)
- Position: Midfielder

Youth career
- –2000: Torstorp IF

Senior career*
Years	Team	Apps	(Gls)
2000–2005	Östers IF	88	(12)
2006–2010	Syrianska FC	81	(6)
2011–2016	Östers IF	160	(33)
2017	Åryds IK		

Managerial career
- 2017–2019: Östers IF (U21)
- 2017–2019: Östers IF (assistant)
- 2019–2021: Östers IF
- * Club domestic league appearances and goals

Denis Velić (born 7 October 1982) is a Swedish football manager and a former player.

== Career ==
=== Coaching career and post-retirement ===
In January 2014, Velić began working as a project manager for integration projects within Växjö Municipality. In August 2015, he was hired by OnePartnerGroup as a salesman and later customer manager.

Retiring at the end of 2016, Velić was hired as assistant coach of Thomas Askebrand at his last club Östers IF and also head coach of the club's U21 team. Beside his duties at Östers, he also played a season with Swedish amateur club, Åryds IK, in 2017 together with his former teammate Patrik Bojent.

On 29 July 2019, he was appointed interim head coach of Östers after Christian Järdler was fired. Velić avoided relegation from Superettan and was rewarded with a permanent two-year contract with an option for one further year on 22 November 2019. He left Östers at the end of the 2021 season.
