= 2018 Hammarby Fotboll season =

Hammarby Fotboll
2018 season
- Chairman: Richard von Yxkull
- Head coach: Stefan Billborn
- Stadium: Tele2 Arena
- Allsvenskan: 4th
- 2017–18 Svenska Cupen: Group stage
- Top goalscorer: League: Nikola Đurđić (13); All: Jiloan Hamad; Nikola Đurđić (13)
- Highest home attendance: 31 810 (4 November vs BK Häcken, Allsvenskan)
- Lowest home attendance: 7 108 (25 February vs GAIS, Svenska Cupen)
- Average home league attendance: 23 679

The 2018 season was Hammarby Fotboll's 103rd in existence, their 49th season in Allsvenskan and their 4th consecutive season in the league. They competed in Allsvenskan and Svenska Cupen during the year. League play started in early April and lasted until early November. Stefan Billborn made his first season as manager.

== Summary ==
In the off-season, on 4 January 2018, the board and Jesper Jansson, director of football, chose to sack manager Jakob Michelsen, citing differences regarding the view on transfers and playing style, as well as a disappointing development of the team and its results. Hammarby finished 9th in Allsvenskan 2017.

== Players ==
=== Squad information ===
N	Pos.	Nat.	Name	Age	Since	App	Goals	Ends	Transfer fee	Notes
1	GK	(Sweden)	Johan Wiland	37	2017	39	0	2019	Undisclosed	
2	DF	(Sweden)	Simon Sandberg	24	2018	23	0	2019	Free	
3	DF	(Brazil)	Neto Borges	22	2018	26	0	2021 (June)	Undisclosed	
4	DF	(Denmark)	Bjørn Paulsen	27	2017	58	13	2019	Undisclosed	
5	DF	(Sweden)	David Fällman	28	2018	27	0	2020	Free	
6	MF	(Sweden)	Jiloan Hamad (vice captain)	28	2017	54	15	2018	Undisclosed	
7	FW	(Sweden)	Imad Khalili	31	2015	55	4	2019	Free	
8	MF	(Denmark)	Jeppe Andersen	26	2017	41	1	2020 (June)	Free	
9	FW	(Norway)	Sander Svendsen	21	2017	29	6	2021 (June)	Undisclosed	
10	MF	(Sweden)	Kennedy Bakircioglu (captain)	38	2012	269	79	2018	Free	
11	MF	(Montenegro)	Vladimir Rodić	25	2018	14	3	2021	Undisclosed	
13	DF	(Denmark)	Mads Fenger	28	2017	29	2	2020 (June)	Free	
14	MF	(Sweden)	Junes Barny	29	2018	13	1	2018	Free	
16	MF	(Sweden)	Leo Bengtsson	20	2016	28	0	2019 (June)	Youth system	
17	MF	(Sweden)	Dušan Jajić	20	2015	8	0	2019	Undisclosed	On loan to IK Frej (Note: Hammarby IF have cooperations with IK Frej and Västerås SK and might temporarily loan out players during the season and recall them without further notice.)
18	MF	(Sweden)	Rebin Asaad	24	2017	10	0	2018	Free	On loan to IK Frej
19	MF	(Gabon)	Serge-Junior Martinsson Ngouali	26	2017	47	2	2020 (June)	Undisclosed	
20	MF	(Ghana)	Abdul Halik Hudu	18	2018	0	0	2021 (June)	Undisclosed	
21	DF	(Sweden)	Oscar Krusnell	19	2017	5	0	2020 (June)	Undisclosed	
22	FW	(Sweden)	Muamer Tanković	23	2017	42	8	2020 (June)	Undisclosed	
23	DF	(Sweden)	Marcus Degerlund	20	2016	22	0	2021 (June)	Youth system	On loan to IFK Göteborg
25	GK	(Sweden)	Davor Blažević	25	2018	5	0	2019	Free	
27	GK	(Sweden)	Benny Lekström	37	2017	10	0	2018	Free	
40	FW	(Serbia)	Nikola Đurđić	32	2018	27	13	2021	Free	
77	DF	(Norway)	Mats Solheim	31	2015	84	5	2019	Undisclosed	

- Last updated: 14 November 2018
- Source: Hammarby Fotboll and players' Wikipedia articles
- Ordered by squad number.

=== Transfers ===
==== In ====
No.	Pos.	Nat.	Name	Age	Moving from	Type	Transfer window	Ends	Transfer fee	Source
2	DF	(Sweden)	Simon Sandberg	23	Levski Sofia (Bulgaria)	Bosman	Winter	2019	Free	hammarbyfotboll.se
30	DF	(Brazil)	Neto Borges	21	Tubarão (Brazil)	Transfer	Winter	2021 (June)	Undisclosed	hammarbyfotboll.se
25	GK	(Sweden)	Davor Blažević	25	Assyriska FF	Bosman	Winter	2018 (May)	Free	hammarbyfotboll.se
5	DF	(Sweden)	David Fällman	28	Dalian Transcendence (China)	Bosman	Winter	2020	Free	hammarbyfotboll.se
26	MF	(Sweden)	Erkan Zengin	32	Eskişehirspor (Turkey)	Bosman	Winter	2018 (August)	Free	hammarbyfotboll.se
40	FW	(Serbia)	Nikola Đurđić	31	Randers FC (Denmark)	Bosman	Winter	2018	Free	hammarbyfotboll.se
20	MF	(Ghana)	Abdul Halik Hudu	18	Inter Allies (Ghana)	Transfer	Winter	2021 (June)	Undisclosed	hammarbyfotboll.se
14	MF	(Sweden)	Junes Barny	28	GAIS	Bosman	Summer	2018	Free	hammarbyfotboll.se
11	MF	(Montenegro)	Vladimir Rodić	24	Silkeborg IF (Denmark)	Transfer	Summer	2021	Undisclosed	hammarbyfotboll.se

==== Out ====
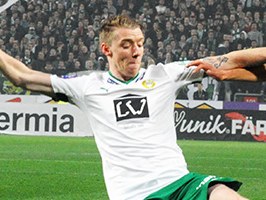
Birkir Már Sævarsson left Hammarby during the off season.

No.	Pos.	Nat.	Name	Age	Moving to	Type	Transfer window	Transfer fee	Source
9	DF	(Sweden)	Stefan Batan	32	Assyriska FF	End of contract	Winter	Free	hammarbyfotboll.se
16	FW	(Brazil)	Rômulo	26	Suphanburi (Thailand)	End of contract	Winter	Free	hammarbyfotboll.se
2	DF	(Iceland)	Birkir Már Sævarsson	33	Valur (Iceland)	End of contract	Winter	Free	hammarbyfotboll.se
–	DF	(Sweden)	Oliver Silverholt	23	Östers IF	End of contract	Winter	Free	hammarbyfotboll.se
17	MF	(Sweden)	Dušan Jajić	19	IK Frej	Loan	Winter	Loan	hammarbyfotboll.se
16	MF	(Sweden)	Leo Bengtsson	19	Gefle IF	Loan	Winter	Loan	hammarbyfotboll.se
23	DF	(Sweden)	Marcus Degerlund	20	IK Frej	Loan	Summer	Loan	hammarbyfotboll.se
28	MF	(Ghana)	Gershon Koffie	26	Free agent	End of contract	Summer	End of contract	hammarbyfotboll.se
14	FW	(The Gambia)	Pa Dibba	30	Shenzhen F.C. (China)	Transfer	Summer	Undisclosed	hammarbyfotboll.se
11	MF	(Iceland)	Arnór Smárason	29	Lillestrøm SK (Norway)	Transfer	Summer	Undisclosed	hammarbyfotboll.se
26	MF	(Sweden)	Erkan Zengin	32	Karagümrük (Turkey)	End of contract	Summer	Free	hammarbyfotboll.se
23	DF	(Sweden)	Marcus Degerlund	20	IFK Göteborg	Loan	Summer	Loan	hammarbyfotboll.se
18	MF	(Iraq)	Rebin Asaad	23	IK Frej	Loan	Winter	Loan	hammarbyfotboll.se

== Player statistics ==
=== Appearances and goals ===
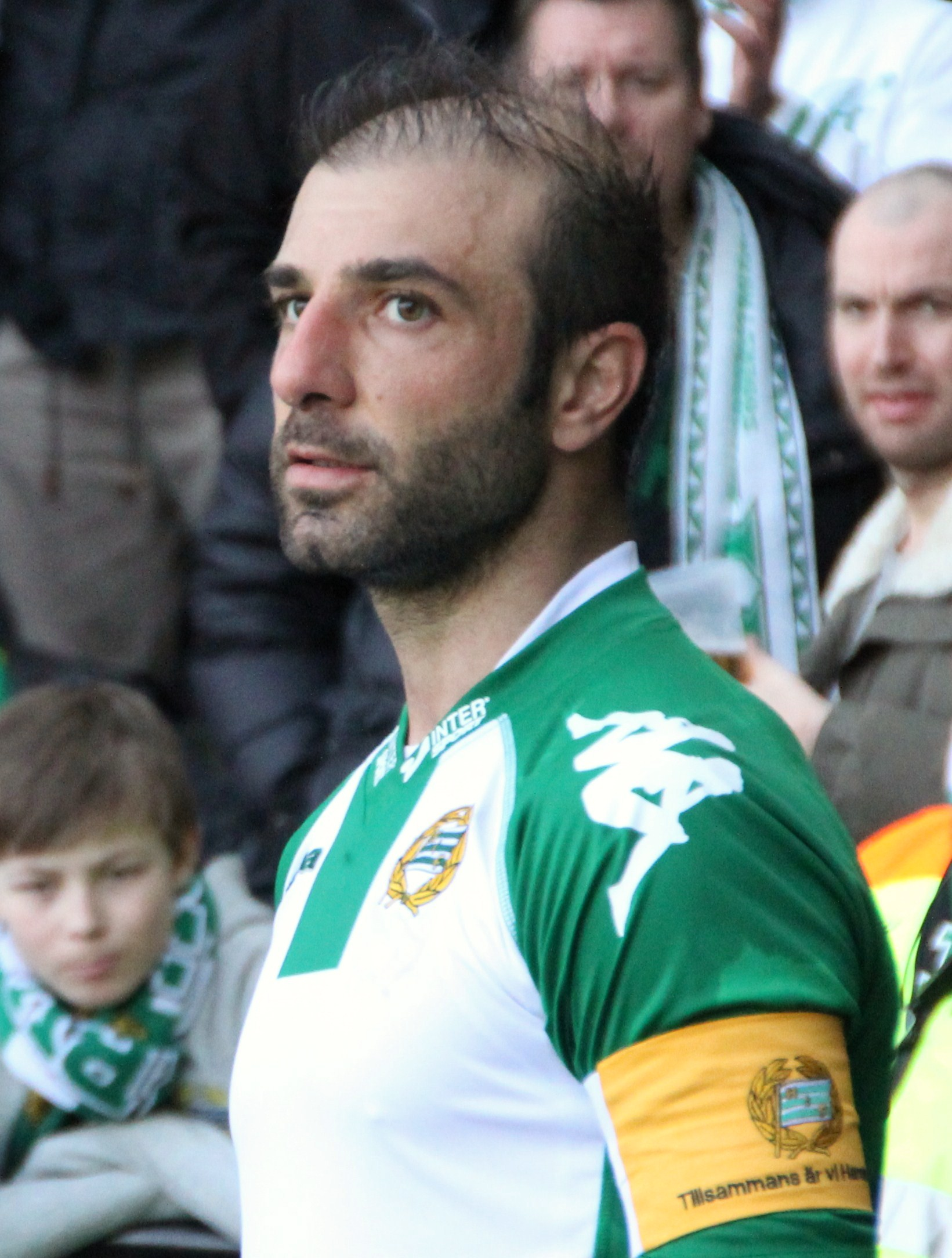
Kennedy Bakircioglu is the captain of Hammarby.

As of 14 November 2018

Number	Position	Name	2018 Allsvenskan		2017–18 Svenska Cupen 2018–19 Svenska Cupen		Total	
Number	Position	Name	Appearances	Goals	Appearances	Goals	Appearances	Goals
1	GK	Johan Wiland	25	0	0	0	25	0
2	DF	Simon Sandberg	23	0	2	0	25	0
3	DF	Neto Borges	26	0	4	0	30	0
4	DF	Bjørn Paulsen	29	5	4	0	33	5
5	DF	David Fällman	27	0	2	0	29	0
6	MF	Jiloan Hamad	29	11	4	2	33	13
7	FW	Imad Khalili	21	2	3	1	24	4
8	MF	Jeppe Andersen	26	1	2	0	28	1
9	FW	Sander Svendsen	19	0	4	1	23	1
10	MF	Kennedy Bakircioglu	12	1	4	1	16	2
11	MF	Vladimir Rodić	14	3	1	1	15	4
13	DF	Mads Fenger	19	2	0	0	19	2
14	MF	Junes Barny	13	1	1	0	14	1
16	MF	Leo Bengtsson	10	0	3	1	13	1
19	MF	Serge-Junior Martinsson Ngouali	26	1	3	1	29	2
20	MF	Abdul Halik Hudu	0	0	1	1	1	1
21	DF	Oscar Krusnell	1	0	1	0	2	0
22	FW	Muamer Tanković	30	7	2	0	32	7
25	GK	Davor Blažević	5	0	1	0	6	0
27	GK	Benny Lekström	0	0	3	0	3	0
40	FW	Nikola Đurđić	27	13	0	0	27	13
77	DF	Mats Solheim	16	0	2	0	18	0
Players that left the club during the season
11	MF	Arnór Smárason	4	0	0	0	4	0
14	FW	Pa Dibba	10	7	3	1	13	8
17	MF	Dušan Jajić	0	0	1	0	1	0
18	MF	Rebin Asaad	0	0	2	0	2	0
23	DF	Marcus Degerlund	1	0	3	0	4	0
26	MF	Erkan Zengin	3	0	0	0	3	0
28	MF	Gershon Koffie	1	0	0	0	1	0

=== Disciplinary record ===
N	P	Nat.	Name	Allsvenskan			Svenska Cupen			Total			Notes
N	P	Nat.	Name	Yellow card	Second yellow card	Red card	Yellow card	Second yellow card	Red card	Yellow card	Second yellow card	Red card	Notes
1	GK	(Sweden)	Johan Wiland										
2	DF	(Sweden)	Simon Sandberg										
3	DF	(Brazil)	Neto Borges	4			2			6			
4	MF	(Denmark)	Bjørn Paulsen	6			2			8			
5	DF	(Sweden)	David Fällman	4						4			
6	MF	(Sweden)	Jiloan Hamad	2			1			3			
7	FW	(Sweden)	Imad Khalili										
8	MF	(Denmark)	Jeppe Andersen	9			1			10			
9	FW	(Norway)	Sander Svendsen										
10	MF	(Sweden)	Kennedy Bakircioglu										
11	MF	(Iceland)	Arnór Smárason	1						1			
11	MF	(Montenegro)	Vladimir Rodić	1						1			
13	DF	(Denmark)	Mads Fenger	3						3			
14	MF	(Sweden)	Junes Barny	1						1			
14	FW	(The Gambia)	Pa Dibba	3						3			
16	MF	(Sweden)	Leo Bengtsson	1						1			
17	MF	(Sweden)	Dušan Jajić				1			1			
18	MF	(Sweden)	Rebin Asaad										
19	MF	(Gabon)	Serge-Junior Martinsson Ngouali	2						2			
20	MF	(Ghana)	Abdul Halik Hudu										
21	DF	(Sweden)	Oscar Krusnell										
22	FW	(Sweden)	Muamer Tanković	2						2			
23	DF	(Sweden)	Marcus Degerlund				2			2			
25	GK	(Sweden)	Davor Blažević										
26	MF	(Sweden)	Erkan Zengin										
27	GK	(Sweden)	Benny Lekström										
28	MF	(Ghana)	Gershon Koffie										
40	FW	(Serbia)	Nikola Đurđić	6						6			
77	DF	(Norway)	Mats Solheim	1						1			

Last updated: 14 November 2018
Source: hammarbyfotboll.se
Only competitive matches
(yellow card) = Number of bookings; (second yellow card) = Number of sending offs after a second yellow card; (red card) = Number of sending offs by a direct red card.

== Club ==
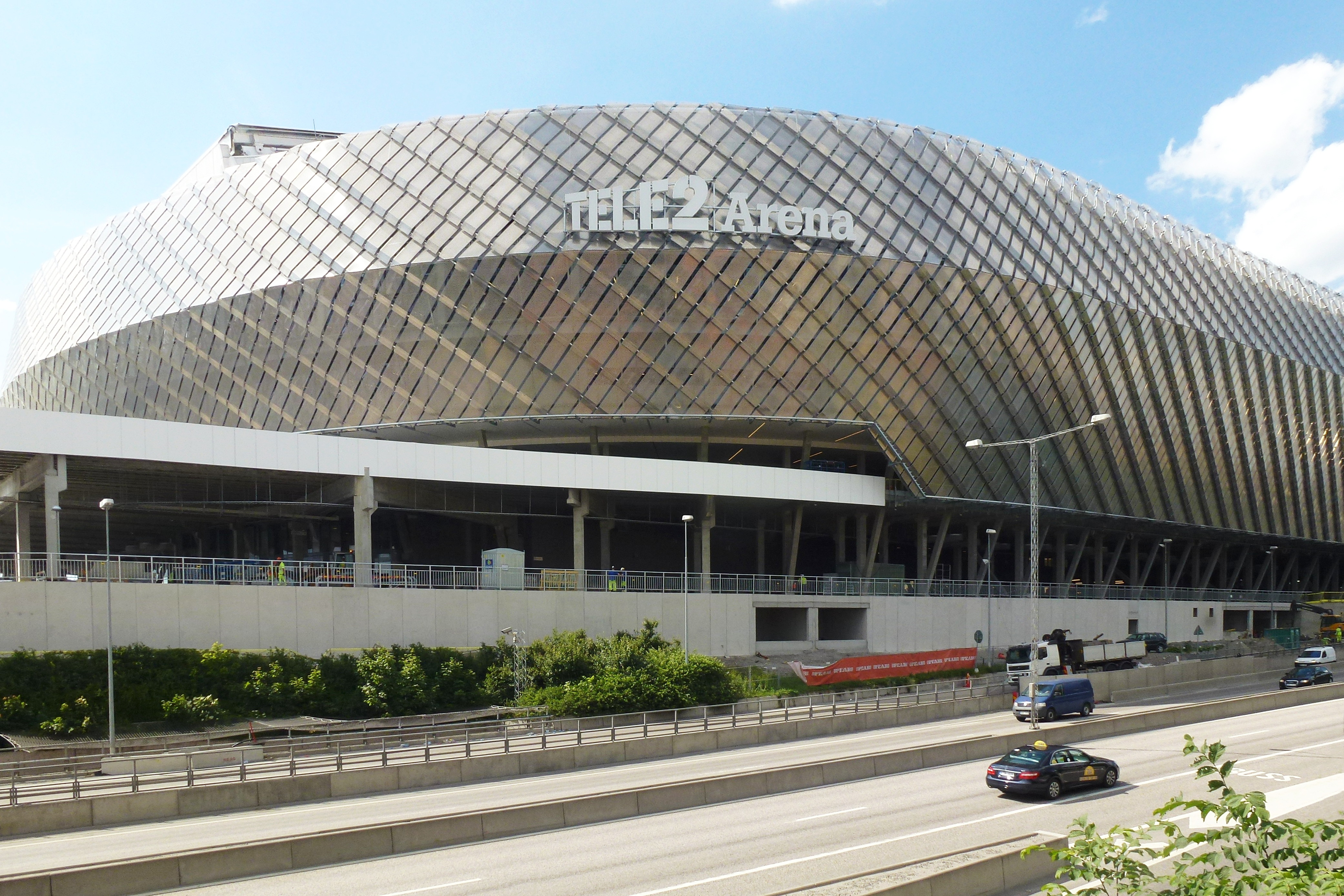
Tele2 Arena is the second largest stadium in Allsvenskan.

=== Coaching staff ===
Position	Staff
Manager	(Sweden) Stefan Billborn
Assistant manager	(Sweden) Joachim Björklund
Assistant manager	(Sweden) Pablo Piñones Arce
Goalkeeping coach	(Sweden) Mikael "Mille" Olsson
Fitness coach	(Sweden) Jimmy Lidberg
Club doctor	(Sweden) Mikael Klotz
Physiotherapist	(Sweden) Linda Eisersjö
Physiotherapist	(Sweden) Andreas Gavelius
Equipment manager	(Sweden) Anders Bitén
U19 head coach	(Sweden) Stefan Olsson
U19 assistant coach	(Sweden) Lukas Syberyjski
U17 head coach	(Sweden) Fredrik Samuelsson
U17 assistant coach	(Sweden) Thomas Lyth
U19 and U17 goalkeeping coach	(Sweden) Gustav Scheutz
U19 and U17 fitness coach	(Sweden) Nebez Kurban

=== Other information ===
Chairman	(Sweden) Richard von Yxkull
Chief Executive Officer	(Sweden) Henrik Kindlund
Director of football	(Sweden) Jesper Jansson
Technical director	(Sweden) Ola Larsson
Head of scouting	(Sweden) Mikael Hjelmberg
Ground (capacity and dimensions)	Tele2 Arena (33,000 / )

== Pre-season and friendlies ==
=== Friendlies ===
13 January 2018 Friendly	HJK Helsinki (Finland)	3-4	(Sweden) Hammarby IF	Helsinki, Finland
14:00 CET (UTC+01)	Valenčič 36'; Banza 50'; Huhtala 82'	Report	Hamad 2'; Dibba 50'; Asaad 64'; Dibba 90'	Stadium: Telia 5G -areena Attendance: 1 001; Referee: Oskari Hämäläinen

30 January 2018 Friendly	FK Jablonec (Czech Republic)	2–1	(Sweden) Hammarby IF	Parchal, Portugal
17:00 CET (UTC+01)	Chramosta 1'; Chramosta 3'	Report	Bengtsson 65'	Stadium: Estádio Bela Vista

3 February 2018 Friendly	Hammarby IF (Sweden)	0–0	(Republic of Ireland) Shamrock Rovers	Faro, Portugal
21:00 CET (UTC+01)	Hamad (yellow card) 28'	Report		Stadium: Estádio Algarve; Referee: Claúdio Pereira

6 February 2018 Friendly	Stade Nyonnais (Switzerland)	1–2	(Sweden) Hammarby IF (Sweden)	Albufeira, Portugal
17:00 CET (UTC+01)	Kok 46'	Report	Tanković 27'; Tanković 50'; Odilon (yellow card) 55'	Stadium: Estádio da Nora

10 February 2018 Friendly	IK Frej	4–1	Hammarby IF	Stockholm, Sweden
14:00 CET (UTC+01)	Peter 27'; Gerbino Polo 54'; Stavrothanasopoulos 73'; Bouvin 92'	Report	Tanković 69'	Stadium: Vikingavallen; Referee: Victor Wolf (Sweden)

7 March 2018 Friendly	Västerås SK	1–4	Hammarby IF	Västerås, Sweden
16:15 CET (UTC+01)	Berisha 69'	Report	Svendsen 27'; Svendsen 64'; Solheim 75'; Martinsson Ngouali 91'	Stadium: Solid Park Arena; Attendance: 604; Referee: Mohammed Al-Hakim (Sweden)

18 March 2018 Friendly	Hammarby IF (Sweden)	3–0	(Finland) IFK Mariehamn	Södertälje, Sweden
15:00 CET (UTC+01)	Fällman (yellow card) 22'; Hamad 55'; Dibba 61'; Svendsen 92'	Report	Mäenpää (yellow card) 36'	Stadium: Södertälje Fotbollsarena; Referee: Patric Eriksson (Sweden)

25 March 2018 Friendly	Hammarby IF	3–2	IFK Norrköping	Stockholm, Sweden
12:00 CET (UTC+1)	Khalili 7'; Bakircioglu 44'; Andersen (yellow card) 60'; Pa Dibba 76'; Andersen (yellow card) 92' (red card)	Report	Þórarinsson 14'; Lönn 19'; Sjölund (yellow card) 62'	Stadium: Tele2 Arena; Attendance: 4 343; Referee: Stefan Johannesson (Sweden)

28 June 2018 Friendly	IK Sirius	2–1	Hammarby IF	Uppsala, Sweden
13:00 CET (UTC+1)	Maholli 53'; Koita 90'	Report	Svendsen 41'	Stadium: Studenternas IP; Referee: Martin Strömbergsson (Sweden)

3 July 2018 Friendly	FC Gute	3–7	Hammarby IF	Visby, Sweden
19:30 CET (UTC+1)	Nobell 23'; Engqvist 30'; Engqvist 78'	Report	Tanković 7'; Andersen 21'; Tanković 47' (pen.); Smárason 59'; Svendsen 62' (pen.); Bengtsson 65'; Österholm 69'	Stadium: Gutavallen; Attendance: 1 118; Referee: Adam Ladebäck (Sweden)

== Competitions ==
=== Allsvenskan ===
==== League table ====
Pos	Team	Pld	W	D	L	GF	GA	GD	Pts	Qualification or relegation
2	IFK Norrköping	30	19	8	3	51	27	+24	65	Qualification for the Europa League first qualifying round
3	Malmö FF	30	17	7	6	57	29	+28	58	Qualification for the Europa League first qualifying round
4	Hammarby IF	30	17	7	6	56	35	+21	58	
5	BK Häcken	30	16	5	9	58	27	+31	53	Qualification for the Europa League second qualifying round (Note: BK Häcken qualified for the Europa League second qualifying round by winning the 2018–19 Svenska Cupen.)
6	Östersunds FK	30	15	4	11	51	39	+12	49	

Source: svenskfotboll.se (in Swedish)
Rules for classification: 1) Points; 2) Goal difference; 3) Goals scored; 4) Head-to-head points; 5) Head-to-head goal difference; 6) Head-to-head away goals scored; 7) Play-off
(Note: Play-off is only played if need to decide champion, teams for relegation or UEFA competition and will be played on a neutral ground).

==== Results summary ====
Overall								Home						Away					
Pld	W	D	L	GF	GA	GD	Pts	W	D	L	GF	GA	GD	W	D	L	GF	GA	GD
30	17	7	6	56	35	+21	58	10	1	4	29	15	+14	7	6	2	27	20	+7

Source: svenskfotboll.se (in Swedish)

==== Results by round ====
Round	1	2	3	4	5	6	7	8	9	10	11	12	13	14	15	16	17	18	19	20	21	22	23	24	25	26	27	28	29	30
Ground	H	A	H	H	A	A	H	A	H	H	A	H	A	H	A	H	A	H	A	H	A	A	H	H	A	A	H	A	H	A
Result	W	W	W	W	D	W	W	W	L	W	D	L	D	W	W	W	D	W	W	L	D	L	L	W	W	L	D	W	W	D
Position	1	1	1	1	1	1	1	1	1	1	1	1	2	2	2	2	2	2	2	2	3	3	3	3	2	3	3	3	3	4

Source: see below
A = Away; H = Home; W = Win; D = Draw; L = Loss

==== Matches ====
Kickoff times are in (UTC+01) unless stated otherwise.

1 April 2018 Round 1	Hammarby IF	3–1	Sirius	Stockholm
15:00	Andersen (yellow card) 42'; Hamad 45' (pen.); Hamad 50' (pen.); Hamad 91'	Report	Arvidsson (yellow card) 45'; Sirelius (red card) 49'; Ogbu (yellow card) 66'; Lundholm 74'	Stadium: Tele2 Arena; Attendance: 30 220; Referee: Jonas Eriksson (Sweden)

10 April 2018 Round 2	IFK Göteborg	1–2	Hammarby IF	Gothenburg
19:00	Diskerud 60'	Report	Paulsen 62'; Fällman (yellow card) 80'; Hamad 91'	Stadium: Gamla Ullevi; Attendance: 15 467; Referee: Mohammed Al-Hakim (Sweden)

16 April 2018 Round 3	Hammarby IF	4–0	Brommapojkarna	Stockholm
19:00	Khalili 25'; Khalili 50'; Hamad 60'; Dibba 77'	Report	Rauschenberg (yellow card) 1'	Stadium: Tele2 Arena; Attendance: 20 630; Referee: Stefan Johannesson (Sweden)

19 April 2018 Round 4	Hammarby IF	2–1	IFK Norrköping	Stockholm
19:00	Tanković 3'; Dibba 28'; Dibba (yellow card) 85'	Report	Þórarinsson (yellow card) 72'; Thern 82'	Stadium: Tele2 Arena; Attendance: 21 337; Referee: Glenn Nyberg (Sweden)

22 April 2018 Round 5	BK Häcken	2–2	Hammarby IF	Gothenburg
15:00	Paulinho 12'; El Kabir 54'; Lindgren (yellow card) 58'; Mohammed (yellow card) 67'; Arkivuo (yellow card) 83'	Report	Đurđić 32'; Đurđić 33'; Andersen (yellow card) 60'; Paulsen (yellow card) 79'	Stadium: Bravida Arena; Attendance: 4 410; Referee: Patrik Eriksson (Sweden)

29 April 2018 Round 6	Djurgårdens IF	1–2	Hammarby IF	Stockholm
15:00	Kadewere (yellow card) 26'; Une Larsson (yellow card) 68'; Walker 77' (pen.)	Report	Tanković 3'; Smárason (yellow card) 77'; Dibba (yellow card) 86'; Dibba 91'	Stadium: Tele2 Arena; Attendance: 24 396; Referee: Martin Strömbergsson (Sweden)

4 May 2018 Round 7	Hammarby IF	4–3	GIF Sundsvall	Stockholm
19:00	Dibba 15'; Đurđić (yellow card) 17'; Dibba 35'; Đurđić 37'; Dibba 56'	Report	Batanero 73'; Gall 80'; Gall 84'	Stadium: Tele2 Arena; Attendance: 25 092; Referee: Jonas Eriksson (Sweden)

13 May 2018 Round 8	Örebro SK	1–2	Hammarby IF	Örebro
17:30	Igboananike 13'; Hines-Ike (yellow card) 26'; Igboananike (red card) 38'; Boye (yellow card) 68'; Mårtensson (yellow card) 74'; Mårtensson (red card) 90'	Report	Paulsen (yellow card) 45'; Đurđić 51'; Fenger (yellow card) 59'; Hamad 78'	Stadium: Behrn Arena; Attendance: 12 352; Referee: Mohammed Al-Hakim (Sweden)

16 May 2018 Round 10	Hammarby IF	3–2	Malmö FF	Stockholm
19:00	Đurđić 36'; Fällman (yellow card) 46'; Andersen (yellow card) 53'; Đurđić 65'; Dibba 70'	Report	Rieks 19'; Nielsen (yellow card) 35'; Svanberg 46'; Nielsen (yellow card) 68' (red card); Larsson (yellow card) 84'	Stadium: Tele2 Arena; Attendance: 23 490; Referee: Martin Strömbergsson (Sweden)

20 May 2018 Round 9	Hammarby IF	0–1	AIK	Stockholm
15:00		Report	Milošević (yellow card) 39'; Elyounoussi 80' (pen.); Yasin Ghani (yellow card) 93'	Stadium: Tele2 Arena; Attendance: 29 266; Referee: Andreas Ekberg (Sweden)

27 May 2018 Round 11	Kalmar FF	1–1	Hammarby IF	Kalmar
15:00	Romário 54' (pen.); Hiago (yellow card) 64'	Report	Borges (yellow card) 46'; Tanković (yellow card) 53'; Andersen 65'; Fällman (yellow card) 75'; Dibba (yellow card) 77'	Stadium: Guldfågeln Arena; Attendance: 9 313; Referee: Robert Daradic (Sweden)

9 July 2018 Round 12	Hammarby IF	1–2	Östersunds FK	Stockholm
19:00	Paulsen 40'; Paulsen (yellow card) 95'	Report	Mukiibi (yellow card) 38'; Tekie 58'; Ghoddos 61'; Bergqvist (yellow card) 66'; Keita (yellow card) 95'; Gero (yellow card) 95'	Stadium: Tele2 Arena; Attendance: 21 464; Referee: Bojan Pandžić (Sweden)

16 July 2018 Round 13	IF Elfsborg	0–0	Hammarby IF	Borås
19:00	Holmén (yellow card) 70'; Nilsson (yellow card) 91'	Report	Andersen (yellow card) 48'	Stadium: Borås Arena; Attendance: 7 682; Referee: Bojan Pandžić (Sweden)

23 July 2018 Round 14	Hammarby IF	4–1	Dalkurd FF	Stockholm
19:00	Đurđić 13'; Tanković 17'; Đurđić 36'; Hamad 43'; Hamad (yellow card) 48'; Solheim (yellow card) 72'	Report	Buya Turay 84'; Lawan (yellow card) 85'	Stadium: Tele2 Arena; Attendance: 19 969; Referee: Robert Daradic (Sweden)

30 July 2018 Round 15	Trelleborgs FF	1–3	Hammarby IF	Trelleborg
19:00	Blomqvist (yellow card) 52'; Hümmet 55'; Hümmet (yellow card) 68'	Report	Martinsson Ngouali 28'; Đurđić 30'; Fällman (yellow card) 41'; Tanković 72'	Stadium: Vångavallen; Attendance: 5 381; Referee: Johan Krantz (Sweden)

5 August 2018 Round 16	Hammarby IF	1–0	Trelleborgs FF	Stockholm
15:00	Tanković 60'	Report	Hörberg (yellow card) 34'	Stadium: Tele2 Arena; Attendance: 21 834; Referee: Mohammed Al-Hakim (Sweden)

13 August 2018 Round 17	IFK Norrköping	0–0	Hammarby IF	Norrköping
19:00	Moberg Karlsson (yellow card) 38'; Thern (yellow card) 52'	Report	Đurđić (yellow card) 32'; Andersen (yellow card) 50'	Stadium: Östgötaporten; Attendance: 15 119; Referee: Stefan Johannesson (Sweden)

20 August 2018 Round 18	Hammarby IF	2–0	Örebro SK	Stockholm
19:00	Tanković 3'; Hamad (yellow card) 10'; Tanković 80'	Report	Björnquist (yellow card) 22'; Almebäck (yellow card) 44'; Mårtensson (yellow card) 85'	Stadium: Tele2 Arena; Attendance: 20 803; Referee: Robert Daradic (Sweden)

27 August 2018 Round 19	Dalkurd FF	2–3	Hammarby IF	Gävle
19:00	DeJohn 36'; DeJohn 91'	Report	Hamad 23' (pen.); Đurđić 46'; Martinsson Ngouali (yellow card) 80'; Barny 85'	Stadium: Gavlevallen; Attendance: 2 685; Referee: Magnus Lindgren (Sweden)

2 September 2018 Round 20	Hammarby IF	1–3	Djurgårdens IF	Stockholm
15:00	Andersen (yellow card) 9'; Borges (yellow card) 43'; Rodić 65'	Report	Mrabti 20'; Radetinac 59'; Badji 89'; Johansson (yellow card) 91'	Stadium: Tele2 Arena; Attendance: 26 937; Referee: Mohammed Al-Hakim (Sweden)

17 September 2018 Round 21	Sirius	1–1	Hammarby IF	Uppsala
19:00	Björkström (yellow card) 12'; Haglund 16'; Saeid (yellow card) 54'; Arvidsson (yellow card) 62'; Haglund (yellow card) 77'	Report	Bjørn Paulsen (yellow card) 16'; Rodić 79'	Stadium: Studenternas IP; Attendance: 6 377; Referee: Martin Strömbergsson (Sweden)

23 September 2018 Round 22	AIK	1–0	Hammarby IF	Solna
15:00	Elyounoussi (yellow card) 22'; Milošević (yellow card) 24'; Goitom 76'; Linnér (yellow card) 87'; Sundgren (yellow card) 89'	Report	Borges (yellow card) 14'; Martinsson Ngouali (yellow card) 29'; Đurđić (yellow card) 32'	Stadium: Friends Arena; Attendance: 49 034; Referee: Stefan Johannesson (Sweden)

26 September 2018 Round 23	Hammarby IF	0–1	IF Elfsborg	Stockholm
19:00	Andersen (yellow card) 68'	Report	Holst 31'; Karlsson (yellow card) 72'; Holmén (yellow card) 93'	Stadium: Tele2 Arena; Attendance: 17 896; Referee: Kristoffer Karlsson (Sweden)

1 October 2018 Round 24	Hammarby IF	3–0	IFK Göteborg	Stockholm
19:00	Paulsen 26'; Hamad 72' (pen.); Bakircioglu 79'; Đurđić (yellow card) 81'	Report	Boo Wiklander (yellow card) 78'	Stadium: Tele2 Arena; Attendance: 18 973; Referee: Bojan Pandžić (Sweden)

7 October 2018 Round 25	Brommapojkarna	2–4	Hammarby IF	Stockholm
19:00	Lahne 17'; Figueroa (yellow card) 30'; Nilsson (yellow card) 36'; Figueroa 54'; Sandberg Magnusson (yellow card) 78'	Report	Tanković (yellow card) 21'; Paulsen 47'; Rodić (yellow card) 64'; Öhman 66' (o.g.); Fenger 79'; Bengtsson (yellow card) 80'; Đurđić 86'	Stadium: Grimsta IP; Attendance: 4 744; Referee: Glenn Nyberg (Sweden)

20 October 2018 Round 26	Malmö FF	2–1	Hammarby IF	Malmö
13:00	Safari (yellow card) 43'; Antonsson 47'; Rosenberg 57'	Report	Paulsen (yellow card) 5'; Hamad 28' (pen.); Andersen (yellow card) 79'	Stadium: Stadion; Attendance: 19 125; Referee: Kristoffer Karlsson (Sweden)

28 October 2018 Round 27	Hammarby IF	0–0	Kalmar FF	Stockholm
15:00	Đurđić (yellow card) 29'; Borges (yellow card) 38'; Fenger (yellow card) 47'	Report		Stadium: Tele2 Arena; Attendance: 25 473; Referee: Patrik Eriksson (Sweden)

31 October 2018 Round 28	GIF Sundsvall	2–3	Hammarby IF	Sundsvall
19:00	Hallenius 54' (pen.); Hallenius 66'	Report	Fenger 13'; Khalili 34'; Đurđić 52'; Đurđić (yellow card) 55'	Stadium: Idrottsparken; Attendance: 4 638; Referee: Mohammed Al-Hakim (Sweden)

4 November 2018 Round 29	Hammarby IF	1–0	BK Häcken	Stockholm
17:30	Andersen (yellow card) 42'; Paulsen 50'	Report		Stadium: Tele2 Arena; Attendance: 31 810; Referee: Mohammed Al-Hakim (Sweden)

11 November 2018 Round 30	Östersunds FK	3–3	Hammarby IF	Östersund
15:00	Mukiibi 29'; Islamović 45+1'; Pettersson (yellow card) 72'; Sellars 77'	Report	Barny (yellow card) 22'; Đurđić 46'; Hamad 70' (pen.); Paulsen (yellow card) 87'; Fenger (yellow card) 89'; Rodić 90'	Stadium: Jämtkraft Arena; Attendance: 6 183; Referee: Glenn Nyberg (Sweden)

=== Svenska Cupen ===
==== 2017–18 ====
The tournament continued from the 2017 season.

Kickoff times are in UTC+1.

===== Group stage =====
Pos	Team	Pld	W	D	L	GF	GA	GD	Pts	Qualification
1	GAIS	3	2	1	0	10	5	+5	7	Advance to Knockout stage
2	IF Elfsborg	3	2	0	1	8	4	+4	6	
3	Hammarby IF	3	1	1	1	7	6	+1	4	
4	Vasalunds IF	3	0	0	3	1	11	−10	0	

Source: Swedish Football Association
Rules for classification: 1) Points; 2) Goal difference; 3) Goals scored; 4) Head-to-head record; 5) Highest ranked team

18 February 2018 Matchday 1	Vasalunds IF	1–3	Hammarby IF	Stockholm
15:00	Mushitu (yellow card) 37'; Pavey (yellow card) 64'; Traore 75'	Report	Hamad 6'; Hamad 27' (pen.); Jajić (yellow card) 42'; Martinsson Ngouali 52'; Borges (yellow card) 59'; Paulsen (yellow card) 83'	Stadium: Tele2 Arena; Attendance: 5,702; Referee: Farouk Nehdi (Sweden)

25 February 2018 Matchday 2	Hammarby IF	3–3	GAIS	Stockholm
17:00	Borges (yellow card) 11'; Svendsen 17'; Andersen (yellow card) 28'; Dibba 73'; Khalili 88'; Degerlund (yellow card) 90'	Report	Hamidović 19'; Wängberg (yellow card) 23'; Wängberg 37'; Hamidović 70'; Westermark (yellow card) 88'; Westermark (yellow card) 90' (red card)	Stadium: Tele2 Arena; Attendance: 7,108; Referee: Kristoffer Karlsson (Sweden)

4 March 2018 Matchday 3	IF Elfsborg	2–1	Hammarby IF	Borås
15:00	Drešević (yellow card) 11'; Frick 36'; Ishizaki (yellow card) 56'; Holmén 79' (pen.)	Report	Hamad (yellow card) 34'; Degerlund (yellow card) 81'; Bakircioglu 87'	Stadium: Borås Arena; Attendance: 778; Referee: Andreas Ekberg (Sweden)

==== 2018–19 ====
The tournament continues into the 2019 season.

===== Qualification stage =====
23 August 2018 Round 2	Carlstad United	0–3	Hammarby IF	Karlstad
18:00	Boulesteix (yellow card) 42'	Report	Bengtsson 9'; Rodić 29'; Paulsen (yellow card) 66'; Hudu 93'	Stadium: Tingvalla IP; Attendance: 2 441; Referee: Glenn Nyberg (Sweden)
