= Jeppe Andersen =

Danish footballer (born 1992)

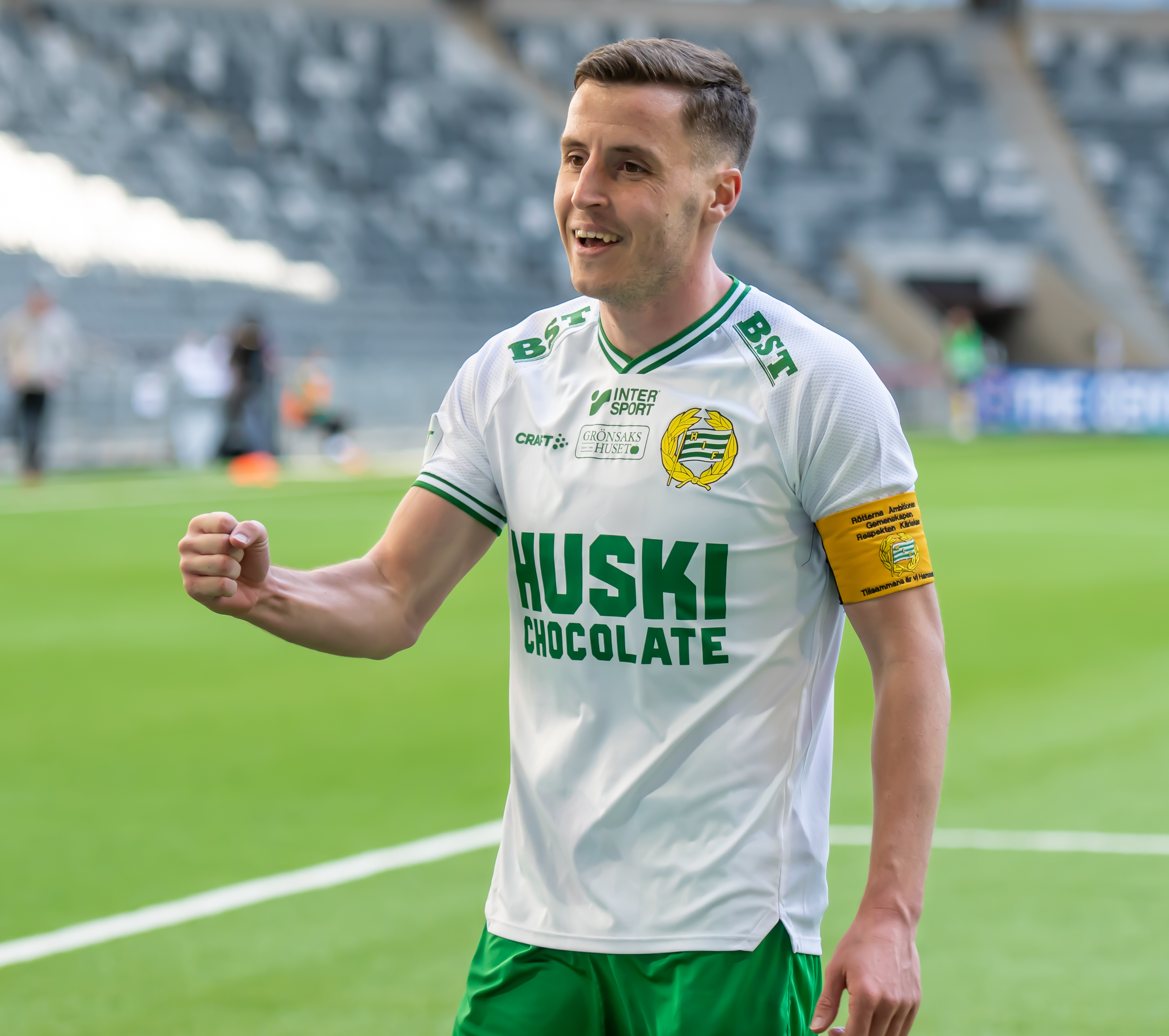
- Andersen with Hammarby IF in 2021

Personal information
- Full name: Jeppe Andrup Andersen
- Date of birth: 6 December 1992 (age 33)
- Place of birth: Denmark
- Height: 1.78 m (5 ft 10 in)
- Position: Midfielder

Team information
- Current team: Silkeborg
- Number: 8

Youth career
- Give Fremad
- 2003–2011: Vejle

Senior career*
Years	Team	Apps	(Gls)
2011–2013	Vejle	53	(7)
2013–2017	Esbjerg fB	72	(3)
2017–2022	Hammarby IF	148	(6)
2023–2024	Sarpsborg 08	38	(1)
2024–2026	Silkeborg	44	(3)

International career
2010	Denmark U18	3	(0)
2011	Denmark U19	4	(0)
2011	Denmark U20	4	(0)
2013–2014	Denmark U21	6	(1)
- * Club domestic league appearances and goals as of 19 May 2026

Jeppe Andrup Andersen (born 6 December 1992) is a Danish professional footballer who plays as a central midfielder.

== Club career ==
=== Vejle ===
Andersen joined the youth teams at Vejle at age 10 from local club Give Fremad. Seven years later, he signed his first professional contract with the club.

He made his first team debut on 25 April 2011, against FC Vestsjælland in the 1st Division, the Danish second tier. Andersen started on the bench but replaced Thomas Mikkelsen in the 63rd minute in a fixture that ended with a 2–1 victory for Vejle. He slowly progressed into an important first team player during his debut season, playing seven games and scoring twice during the spring of 2011. In July the same year, at the end of the season, Andersen signed a new three-year contract with the club.

During the following season, in 2011–12, Andersen continued to develop and played 21 league games under the reign of manager Nicolai Wael. His performances at the central midfield position in Vejle soon led to interested from several clubs in the Danish Superliga. He occasionally also captained the side.

Ultimately, Andersen chose to remain at Vejle through the 2012–13 season. Initially, he remained as a key player in the squad as Vejle fought at the top of the table during the first half of the season. The club however suffered from a series of disappointing results and switched manager to Kim Brink in January 2013. Andersen got dropped from the squad and saw a drastic decrease in playing time during the spring. At the end of the campaign, Vejle finished 3rd in the table and missed out on a promotion. Subsequently, Andersen sought a move elsewhere.

=== Esbjerg fB ===
On 28 May 2013, Andersen transferred to local rival Esbjerg fB on an undisclosed fee. He signed a three-year deal with the club. Initially, Andersen struggled to break into the starting lineup, but made his debut for the side as a second half sub in a 4–0 win against Nordsjælland on 22 July. Later during the same fall, on 7 November, Andersen made his continental debut in a 2013–14 UEFA Europa League group stage win (1–0) against IF Elfsborg. Andersen scored his first goal for Esbjerg in a 1–0 win against Odense on 2 March 2014.

During the following campaign, in 2014–15, Andersen remained as an important first team player at Esbjerg. He made 18 appearances in the league before suffering a bad anterior cruciate ligament injury in March 2015. The injury was projected to keep him sidelined for almost ten months. Andersen, however, returned to the pitch after being sidelined for seven months. Ultimately, he played 15 games during the 2015–16 season.

Ahead of the 2016–17 season, Andersen was appointed as Esbjerg's new club captain. His proneness to injuries would, however, continue and Andersen was sidelined for five months in November following an operation in his knee.

In January 2017, Andersen announced that he would leave Esbjerg at the expiration of his contract the upcoming summer. Simultaneously, the club revealed that they were trying to find a new club for Andersen. Andersen reportedly attracted interest from Danish clubs Brøndby IF and FC Midtjylland, as well as New York City FC in the Major League Soccer. After the closing of the January transfer window, Esbjerg confirmed that there had been no offers for the midfielder. Andersen made his comeback for Esbjerg on 2 April 2017, getting subbed on in the 82nd minute in a 0–0 draw against Randers FC, ultimately ending the campaign on 15 appearances, scoring twice.

=== Hammarby IF ===
==== 2017 ====
On 30 June 2017, following the expiration of his contract at Esbjerg, Andersen signed a three-year deal with the Swedish club Hammarby IF in Allsvenskan. He made his competitive debut weeks later, coming on as a half time substitute in a 3–0 loss against Elfsborg.

==== 2018 ====
In 2018, Andersen played 26 league games, pairing up with Serge-Junior Martinsson Ngouali in the central midfield, as the club finished 4th in the table. He scored one goal during the year, his first competitive goal for the club, in a 1–1 away draw against Kalmar FF on 27 May.

==== 2019 ====
On 29 March 2019, Andersen signed a four-year contract extension with Hammarby, running until the summer of 2023. He was appointed as the new club captain of Hammarby before the start of the 2019 season. He played 26 games during the campaign, scoring two goals, together with Darijan Bojanić in the central midfield, as the club finished 3rd in Allsvenskan after eight straight wins at the end of the season.

==== 2020 ====
In 2020, a season postponed due to the COVID-19 pandemic, Andersen continued as a regular starter and played 28 games, although the side disappointedly finished 8th in the table. He featured in first round of the 2020–21 UEFA Europa League against Puskás Akadémia (in a 3–0 win), before the club was eliminated from the tournament in the second round against Lech Poznań (in a 0–3 loss, where Andersen was sent off).

==== 2021 ====
On 8 May 2021, Andersen made his 100th league appearance for Hammarby, and scored as the club won 3–2 against IK Sirius. On 30 May 2021, he won the 2020–21 Svenska Cupen, the main domestic cup, with Hammarby through a 5–4 win on penalties (0–0 after full-time) against BK Häcken in the final, where Andersen was sent off in the final minutes of overtime. He led the side to the play-off round of the 2021–22 UEFA Europa Conference League, after eliminating Maribor (4–1 on aggregate) and FK Čukarički (6–4 on aggregate), where the club was knocked out by Basel on penalties (4–4 on aggregate). On 23 September 2021, Andersen was stripped of his captaincy by head coach Miloš Milojević, in favour of Darijan Bojanić.

==== 2022 ====
Andersen featured in the final of the 2021–22 Svenska Cupen, in which Hammarby lost by 4–5 on penalties to Malmö FF after the game ended in a 0–0 draw. Throughout the season, he played 27 games in Allsvenskan under new head coach Martí Cifuentes, as Hammarby finished 3rd in the table.

On 8 January 2023, Hammarby reached an agreement with Norwegian Eliteserien club Sarpsborg 08 for his transfer, with only six months remaining on his contract. In total, Andersen made 148 Allsvenskan appearances for Hammarby, thus making him the most capped foreign player in the club's history.

=== Sarpsborg 08 ===
On 8 January 2023, Andersen signed a three-year contract with Sarpsborg 08 in the Norwegian top tier Eliteserien, thus reuniting him with his former head coach Stefan Billborn and teammate Serge-Junior Martinsson Ngouali from Hammarby.

=== Silkeborg ===
On July 18, 2024, Andersen returned to Denmark when he signed a two-year contract with Danish Superliga side Silkeborg.

== International career ==
Andersen won his first cap for the Danish under-21s on 21 March 2013, in a 3–1 away loss in a friendly against France. He scored his first international goal in a 2–2 friendly draw against Czech Republic on 14 November 2014. He also played two competitive games in the 2015 UEFA European Under-21 Championship qualification, against Russia and Bulgaria. Denmark ultimately qualified for the main tournament, but Andersen was not selected in the squad.

== Career statistics ==
As of match played 17 May 2026

Appearances and goals by club, season and competition
Club	Season	League			Cup		Continental		Other		Total	
Club	Season	Division	Apps	Goals	Apps	Goals	Apps	Goals	Apps	Goals	Apps	Goals
Vejle	2010–11	Danish 1st Division	7	2	0	0	—		—		7	2
Vejle	2011–12	Danish 1st Division	21	4	2	0	—		—		23	4
Vejle	2012–13	Danish 1st Division	25	1	2	0	—		—		27	1
Vejle	Total		53	7	4	0	0	0	—		57	7
Esbjerg fB	2013–14	Danish Superliga	23	1	1	0	4 (Note: Appearances in UEFA Europa League)	0	—		28	1
Esbjerg fB	2014–15	Danish Superliga	19	0	3	1	4	0	—		26	1
Esbjerg fB	2015–16	Danish Superliga	15	0	0	0	—		—		15	0
Esbjerg fB	2016–17	Danish Superliga	15	2	1	0	—		—		16	2
Esbjerg fB	Total		72	3	5	1	8	0	—		85	4
Hammarby IF	2017	Allsvenskan	15	0	1	0	—		—		16	0
Hammarby IF	2018	Allsvenskan	26	1	2	0	—		—		28	1
Hammarby IF	2019	Allsvenskan	26	2	3	1	—		—		29	3
Hammarby IF	2020	Allsvenskan	28	0	5	1	2	0	—		35	1
Hammarby IF	2021	Allsvenskan	26	2	7	2	4 (Note: Appearances in UEFA Europa Conference League)	0	—		37	4
Hammarby IF	2022	Allsvenskan	27	1	7	1	—		—		34	2
Hammarby IF	Total		148	6	25	5	6	0	—		179	11
Sarpsborg 08	2023	Eliteserien	25	1	3	0	—		—		28	1
Sarpsborg 08	2024	Eliteserien	13	0	2	0	—		—		15	0
Sarpsborg 08	Total		38	1	5	0	—		—		43	1
Silkeborg	2024–25	Danish Superliga	31	3	4	0	4 (Note: Two appearances in UEFA Europa League, two appearances in UEFA Conference League)	0	1 (Note: Appearance in Danish Superliga European play-off match)	1	40	4
Silkeborg	2025–26	Danish Superliga	13	0	1	0	2 (Note: Appearances in UEFA Conference League)	0	0	0	16	0
Silkeborg	Total		44	3	5	0	6	0	1	1	56	4
Career total			355	20	44	6	20	1	1	0	420	27

== Honours ==
Hammarby IF

- Svenska Cupen: 2020–21
