= 2018 Superettan =

Superettan
- Season: 2018
- Champions: Helsingborgs IF
- Promoted: Helsingborgs IF; Falkenbergs FF; AFC Eskilstuna
- Relegated: IFK Värnamo; Gefle IF; Landskrona BoIS
- Matches played: 240
- Top goalscorer: Andri Rúnar Bjarnason (16 goals)
- Biggest home win: Östers IF 5–0 Landskrona BoIS (6 October 2018)
- Biggest away win: IK Frej 1–5 Helsingborgs IF (14 April 2018); Gefle IF 1–5 Landskrona BoIS (28 May 2018); IK Frej 1–5 Halmstads BK (26 August 2018); IK Brage 0–4 Östers IF (11 August 2018)
- Highest scoring: GAIS 4–4 Örgryte IS (12 June 2018); Östers IF 4–4 Helsingborgs IF (27 October 2018)
- Longest winning run: 7 matches Helsingborgs IF
- Longest unbeaten run: 17 matches AFC Eskilstuna
- Longest winless run: 13 matches Gefle IF
- Longest losing run: 8 matches IFK Värnamo
- Highest attendance: 16,089; Helsingborgs IF 2–0 Norrby IF (2 August 2018)
- Lowest attendance: 211; IFK Värnamo 2–0 Varbergs BoIS (24 April 2018)
- Average attendance: 2,278

The 2018 Superettan was part of the 2018 Swedish football season, and the 19th season of Superettan, Sweden's second-tier football division in its current format. A total of 16 teams contest the league.

Fixtures for the 2018 season were announced on 21 December 2017.

== Teams ==
A total of 16 teams contest the league. The top two teams qualify directly for promotion to Allsvenskan, the third will enter a play-off for the chance of promotion.

=== Stadia and locations ===
Locations of the 2018 Superettan teams

Team	Location	Stadium	Turf^{1}	Stadium capacity^{1}
AFC Eskilstuna	Eskilstuna	Tunavallen	Artificial	7,800
Degerfors IF	Degerfors	Stora Valla	Natural	12,500
Falkenbergs FF	Falkenberg	Falcon Alkoholfri Arena	Natural	5,565
GAIS	Gothenburg	Gamla Ullevi	Natural	18,416
Gefle IF	Gävle	Gavlevallen	Artificial	6,500
Halmstads BK	Halmstad	Örjans Vall	Natural	10,873
Helsingborgs IF	Helsingborg	Olympia	Natural	16,500
IFK Värnamo	Värnamo	Finnvedsvallen	Natural	5,000
IK Brage	Borlänge	Domnarvsvallen	Artificial	6,500
IK Frej	Täby kyrkby	Vikingavallen	Artificial	2,650
Jönköpings Södra IF	Jönköping	Stadsparksvallen	Natural	5,500
Landskrona BoIS	Landskrona	Landskrona IP	Natural	10,500
Norrby IF	Borås	Borås Arena	Artificial	17,800
Varbergs BoIS	Varberg	Påskbergsvallen	Natural	4,500
Örgryte IS	Gothenburg	Gamla Ullevi	Natural	18,416
Östers IF	Växjö	Myresjöhus Arena	Natural	12,000

=== Personnel and sponsoring ===
All teams are obligated to have the logo of the league sponsor Svenska Spel as well as the Superettan logo on the right sleeve of their shirt.

Note: Flags indicate national team as has been defined under FIFA eligibility rules. Players and Managers may hold more than one non-FIFA nationality.

Team	Head coach^{1}	Captain	Kit manufacturer	Main shirt sponsor
AFC Eskilstuna	(Sweden) Nemanja Miljanović	(Kosovo) Anel Raskaj	Nike	Various
Degerfors IF	(Sweden) Stefan Jacobsson	(Sweden) Christoffer Wiktorsson	Adidas	Various
Falkenbergs FF	(Sweden) Hans Eklund	(Sweden) Tibor Joza	Nike	Gekås Ullared
GAIS	(Sweden) Bosko Orović	(Sweden) Carl Nyström	Select	Various
Gefle IF	(Sweden) Marcus Bengtsson	(Sweden) Jonas Lantto	Umbro	Various
Halmstads BK	(Sweden) Igor Krulj	(Sweden) Peter Larsson	Puma	Various
Helsingborgs IF	(Sweden) Per-Ola Ljung	(Sweden) Pär Hansson	Puma	Resurs Bank
IFK Värnamo	(Sweden) Roar Hansen	(Sweden) Pär Cederqvist	Puma	Various
IK Brage	(Sweden) Klebér Saarenpää	(Sweden) Robbin Sellin	Select	Various
IK Frej	(Sweden) Roberth Björknesjö	(Sweden) Marcus Hansson	Puma	Various
Jönköpings Södra IF	(Sweden) Jörgen Wålemark	(Sweden) Tommy Thelin	Nike	Volkswagen
Landskrona BoIS	(Denmark) Jack Majgaard	(Sweden) Philip Andersson	Nike	Various
Norrby IF	(Sweden) Korosh Hatami	(Sweden) Marcus Översjö	Nike	Various
Varbergs BoIS FC	(Sweden) Joakim Persson	(United States) Matt Pyzdrowski	Nike	Various
Örgryte IS	(Sweden) Thomas Askebrand	(Sweden) Daniel Paulson	Nike	HA Bygg
Östers IF	(Sweden) Christian Järdler	(Sweden) Mario Vasilj	Puma	Various

== League table ==
Pos	Team	Pld	W	D	L	GF	GA	GD	Pts	Promotion, qualification or relegation
1	Helsingborgs IF (C, P)	30	18	9	3	59	30	+29	63	Promotion to Allsvenskan
2	Falkenbergs FF (P)	30	18	5	7	61	34	+27	59	Promotion to Allsvenskan
3	AFC Eskilstuna (O, P)	30	13	15	2	40	16	+24	54	Qualification to Promotion playoffs
4	Örgryte IS	30	15	7	8	56	37	+19	52	
5	Halmstads BK	30	15	6	9	49	38	+11	51	
6	IK Brage	30	12	9	9	46	45	+1	45	
7	Degerfors IF	30	11	9	10	45	46	−1	42	
8	Östers IF	30	11	8	11	48	43	+5	41	
9	IK Frej	30	10	7	13	46	56	−10	37	
10	GAIS	30	8	11	11	40	41	−1	35	
11	Jönköpings Södra IF	30	9	8	13	31	38	−7	35	
12	Norrby IF	30	9	7	14	31	50	−19	34	
13	IFK Värnamo (R)	30	9	5	16	31	48	−17	32	Qualification to Relegation playoffs
14	Varbergs BoIS (O)	30	7	8	15	43	54	−11	29	Qualification to Relegation playoffs
15	Gefle IF (R)	30	6	7	17	31	60	−29	25	Relegation to Division 1
16	Landskrona BoIS (R)	30	5	7	18	35	56	−21	22	Relegation to Division 1

Source: svenskfotboll.se (in Swedish)
Rules for classification: 1) Points; 2) Goal difference; 3) Number of goals scored; 4) Head-to-head points; 5) Head-to-head goal difference; 6) Head-to-head away goals scored
(C) Champions; (O) Play-off winners; (P) Promoted; (R) Relegated

=== Playoffs ===
The 13th-placed and 14th-placed teams of Superettan meet the two runners-up from 2018 Division 1 (Norra and Södra) in two-legged ties on a home-and-away basis with the team from Superettan finishing at home.

14 November 2018
19:00

Syrianska FC	1–0	IFK Värnamo
Hellberg 48' (pen.)	Report

Södertälje Fotbollsarena, Södertälje
Attendance: 2,103
Referee: Adam Ladebäck
18 November 2018
14:30

IFK Värnamo	2–2	Syrianska FC
Achinioti-Jönsson 50'; Henningsson 82'	Report	Rajalakso 45+1'; Ranégie 90+1'

Finnvedsvallen, Värnamo
Attendance: 1,526
Referee: Victor Wolf

Syrianska FC won 3–2 on aggregate.

14 November 2018
16:45

Oskarshamns AIK	4–2	Varbergs BoIS
Skogh 4'; Kvist 44', 58'; Christensson 71'	Report	Krezic 66'; Modig 90+3'

Arena Oskarshamn, Oskarshamn
Attendance: 2,029
Referee: Fredrik Klitte
18 November 2018
14:30

Varbergs BoIS	2–0	Oskarshamns AIK
Izuchukwu 20'; Ejupi 41'	Report

Påskbergsvallen, Varberg
Attendance: 1,364
Referee: Granit Maqedonci

4–4 on aggregate. Varbergs BoIS won on away goals.

=== Positions by round ===
Team ╲ Round	1	2	3	4	5	6	7	8	9	10	11	12	13	14	15	16	17	18	19	20	21	22	23	24	25	26	27	28	29	30
Helsingborgs IF	13	7	5	8	6	4	5	5	4	4	5	3	4	2	2	2	2	1	1	1	1	1	1	1	2	1	1	1	1	1
Falkenbergs FF	2	2	1	1	1	3	2	3	2	1	1	1	1	1	1	1	1	2	2	2	2	2	2	2	1	2	2	2	2	2
AFC Eskilstuna	10	13	8	4	3	2	3	2	3	3	4	2	3	4	4	4	3	3	3	3	3	3	3	3	3	3	3	3	3	3
Örgryte IS	1	1	4	2	2	1	1	1	1	2	2	4	5	5	6	6	6	8	8	8	8	6	7	7	5	5	5	5	4	4
Halmstads BK	3	3	6	10	11	6	4	4	5	5	3	5	2	3	3	3	4	4	5	4	4	4	4	4	4	4	4	4	5	5
IK Brage	11	5	2	3	4	5	6	6	6	6	7	6	6	6	5	5	5	7	6	5	5	5	5	5	6	6	6	6	6	6
Degerfors IF	6	10	10	5	10	13	7	7	7	7	6	7	7	7	7	8	8	6	7	7	6	7	6	6	7	7	8	8	8	7
Östers IF	7	12	13	12	13	11	10	8	10	11	12	10	9	9	9	7	7	5	4	6	7	8	8	8	8	8	7	7	7	8
IK Frej	8	10	14	15	16	16	16	16	15	15	15	14	13	13	14	13	10	10	10	11	11	12	12	12	11	11	9	9	10	9
GAIS	4	4	7	7	5	9	12	13	8	8	8	8	8	8	8	9	9	9	9	9	9	9	9	10	10	12	11	11	12	10
Jönköpings Södra IF	14	15	15	16	14	14	13	9	9	10	10	9	10	10	10	10	11	11	11	10	10	10	10	11	12	13	14	12	9	11
Norrby IF	9	6	3	6	8	8	11	11	13	13	11	12	11	11	11	11	12	12	12	12	12	11	11	9	9	9	10	10	11	12
IFK Värnamo	15	14	16	13	15	15	15	15	16	16	16	16	16	16	16	16	16	16	15	14	14	13	14	14	14	14	13	14	13	13
Varbergs BoIS	16	16	12	14	12	7	8	10	11	12	13	13	14	14	13	14	14	14	13	13	13	15	13	13	13	10	12	13	14	14
Gefle IF	5	9	11	9	9	12	14	14	14	14	14	15	15	15	15	15	15	15	16	16	16	16	16	16	16	16	16	15	15	15
Landskrona BoIS	12	8	9	11	7	10	9	12	12	9	9	11	12	12	12	12	13	13	14	15	15	14	15	15	15	15	15	16	16	16

Promotion to Allsvenskan
Promotion play-offs
Relegation play-offs
Relegation to Division 1

Source: everysport.com (in Swedish)

== Season statistics ==
=== Top scorers ===
As of 10 November 2018

Rank	Player	Club	Goals
1	(Iceland) Andri Rúnar Bjarnason	Helsingborgs IF	16
2	(Sweden) Erik Björndahl	Degerfors IF	14
2	(Nigeria) Chisom Egbuchulam	Falkenbergs FF	14
4	(Japan) Kosuke Kinoshita	Halmstads BK	13
4	(Sweden) Diego Montiel	Örgryte IS	13
6	(Sweden) Pär Cederqvist	IFK Värnamo	12
6	(Bosnia and Herzegovina) Dragan Kapčević	Östers IF	12
6	(Nigeria) Samuel Nnamani	AFC Eskilstuna	12
6	(Sweden) Joakim Runnemo	IK Frej	12

=== Hat-tricks ===
Player	For	Against	Result	Date
(Iceland) Andri Rúnar Bjarnason	Helsingborgs IF	IK Frej	1–5	14 April 2018
(Sweden) Sargon Abraham	Degerfors IF	Norrby IF	1–3	14 May 2018
(Japan) Kosuke Kinoshita	Halmstads BK	Varbergs BoIS	2–3	2 June 2018
(Sweden) Simon Alexandersson	IK Brage	IFK Värnamo	2–3	30 June 2018
(Sweden) Dušan Jajić	IK Frej	Gefle IF	2–5	5 August 2018
(Nigeria) Chisom Egbuchulam	Falkenbergs FF	Degerfors IF	4–1	26 August 2018
