= Dušan Jajić =

Swedish footballer

Personal information
- Date of birth: 4 July 1998 (age 28)
- Place of birth: Stockholm, Sweden
- Height: 1.75 m (5 ft 9 in)
- Position: Midfielder

Team information
- Current team: Haninge

Youth career
- –2012: Haninge/Brandbergen

Senior career*
Years	Team	Apps	(Gls)
2013–2014	Haninge/Brandbergen	17	(2)
2015–2019	Hammarby IF	8	(0)
2016	→ Enskede (loan)	1	(0)
2017	→ Frej (loan)	14	(3)
2018	→ Frej (loan)	29	(9)
2019	Brommapojkarna	27	(6)
2020–2021	Vendsyssel	31	(0)
2021–2022	Västerås	40	(5)
2023	Sundsvall	8	(0)
2024–2026	Vasalund	35	(9)
2026–	Haninge	0	(0)

International career
2013–2015	Sweden U17	21	(0)
2015–2017	Sweden U19	18	(2)
- * Club domestic league appearances and goals as of 3 March 2026

Dušan Jajić (born 4 July 1998) is a Swedish footballer who plays as a midfielder for Haninge.

== Club career ==
=== IFK Haninge/Brandbergen ===
Raised in the Stockholm suburb Jordbro, Jajić started his career at local club IFK Haninge/Brandbergen where he made his senior debut in 2013 at age fifteen. This in the fifth tier of Swedish football, Division 3 Södra Svealand.

During his first years in senior football Jajić went on trials abroad at both Arsenal and Atalanta.

=== Hammarby IF ===
In early 2015 he got invited to train with Hammarby IF, and in March the same year he signed a three-year contract with the Allsvenskan club.

During his first year at the club, he initially played with the club’s U19 and U21 teams, but made his competitive senior debut in Allsvenskan against Åtvidabergs FF on October 2. Aged seventeen, he made his first start for the club on the last game day of the 2015 season in Hammarby's 2–1 away loss against Halmstads BK.

He would make another 3 appearances in Allsvenskan for Hammarby during the 2016 season, whilst also enjoying a short loan stint to their affiliated club Enskede IK in the Swedish third tier.

On 17 March 2017, he signed a new three-year deal with Hammarby. In the beginning of the season, Jajić appeared in all 3 of Hammarby's games in the group stage of Svenska Cupen. Midway through the season, on 21 July 2017, after only appearing in 3 league games, Jajić went out on a six-month loan to IK Frej in Superettan. Jajić also spent the vast majority of the 2018 season on loan at IK Frej, scoring 9 goals in 29 league appearances in the Swedish second tier.

=== Brommapojkarna ===
On 9 March, Jajić transferred to IF Brommapojkarna, newly relegated to Superettan. He signed a three-year deal with the club.

=== Vendsyssel FF ===
On 16 January 2020 it was confirmed, that Jajić had joined Danish 1st Division club Vendsyssel FF on a contract until the summer 2023.

== International career ==
He is of Serbian descent through his parents. Jajić once considered representing the country on an international level, but states that he never was approached by the Serbian football association.

Instead, Dušan Jajić played 21 games for Sweden U17 between 2013 and 2015, where he at a regular basis also captained the side.

As of the 2016 season he is a member of the Sweden U19 team. He scored his first international goal in a friendly against Slovakia U19 in September 2015. The game finished 2-2 with Jajic opening the score tally. Jajić captained his country during the 2017 UEFA European Under-19 Championship, where Sweden finished last in its group following two losses in even games against Czech Republic and Georgia, and a surprising 2–2 draw against Portugal.

== Career statistics ==
=== Club ===
As of 20 November 2018

Club	Season	League			Cup		Continental		Total	
Club	Season	Division	Apps	Goals	Apps	Goals	Apps	Goals	Apps	Goals
Hammarby IF	2015	Allsvenskan	2	0	0	0	—		2	0
Hammarby IF	2016	Allsvenskan	3	0	0	0	—		3	0
Hammarby IF	2017	Allsvenskan	3	0	3	0	—		6	0
Hammarby IF	2018	Allsvenskan	0	0	1	0	—		1	0
Total			8	0	4	0	0	0	12	0
Enskede IK (loan)	2016	Division 1	1	0	0	0	—		1	0
IK Frej (loan)	2017	Superettan	14	3	0	0	—		14	3
IK Frej (loan)	2018	Superettan	29	9	0	0	—		29	9
Career total			52	12	4	0	0	0	56	12
