= Serge-Junior Martinsson Ngouali =

Swedish-Gabonese footballer (born 1992)

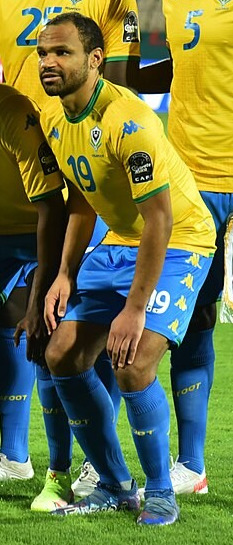
- Martinsson Ngouali with Gabon at the 2021 Africa Cup of Nations

Personal information
- Full name: Serge-Junior Bertil Nicolas; Martinsson Ngouali
- Date of birth: 23 January 1992 (age 34)
- Place of birth: Gothenburg, Sweden
- Height: 1.73 m (5 ft 8 in)
- Position: Midfielder

Team information
- Current team: IF Brommapojkarna
- Number: 5

Youth career
- Gunnilse IS
- Västra Frölunda IF
- 2004–2009: IF Brommapojkarna

Senior career*
Years	Team	Apps	(Gls)
2009–2016	IF Brommapojkarna	172	(11)
2017–2020	Hammarby IF	73	(3)
2021–2022	HNK Gorica	12	(0)
2022–2024	Sarpsborg 08	62	(3)
2024–	IF Brommapojkarna	32	(0)

International career^{‡}
2009–2011	Sweden U19	12	(1)
2011	Sweden U21	1	(0)
2017–	Gabon	16	(0)
- * Club domestic league appearances and goals as of 8 July 2026 ‡ National team caps and goals as of 30 October 2024

Serge-Junior Martinsson Ngouali (born 23 January 1992), commonly known simply as Junior, is a professional footballer who plays as a midfielder for Allsvenskan club IF Brommapojkarna. Born in Sweden, he plays for the Gabon national team.

== Early life ==
Martinsson Ngouali was born in Gothenburg, Sweden, to a Central African father of Gabonese descent. His mother is Swedish and Serge-Junior grew up in the city of Gothenburg. Living in the suburb of Hammarkullen, he started to play football at local clubs Gunnilse IS and Västra Frölunda IF.

Together with his mother and twin brother Tom Martinsson Ngouali, also a former professional footballer, he moved to Stockholm in 2003. At age 11, he joined the academy at IF Brommapojkarna.

== Career ==
=== Brommapojkarna ===
In 2010, he made his debut for Brommapojkarna in Allsvenskan – the Swedish top tier – at age 18. He played 12 games in the league during his debut season, as Brommapojkarna got relegated to Superettan.

He established himself as a regular starter in the central midfield position for Brommapojkarna in 2012 and 2013, only missing a few competitive games. Martinsson Ngouali soon got known for his technical gift and strong passing game.

Before the start of the 2014 season, he attracted interest from then reigning Swedish champions Malmö FF. Martinsson Ngouali opted to stay at Brommapojkarna and signed a new three-year deal with the club. He made 28 appearances for the side the same year, marking his first full season in Allsvenskan.

Martinsson Ngouali also featured in both legs against the Serie A side Torino as Brommapojkarna got knocked out from the 2014–15 UEFA Europa League third qualifying round. In the first leg on home ground, he got fouled inside the penalty area by defender Giuseppe Vives who received a red card from the referee. Striker Dardan Rexhepi however missed the penalty and Brommapojkarna eventually lost with 0–7 on aggregate.

Brommapojkarna eventually declined and got relegated to Superettan before the start the 2015 season, where they would finish in last place. In 2016, Martinsson Ngouali scored 7 goals – a new career best – as Brommapojkarna won Division 1, the Swedish third tier.

=== Hammarby ===
==== 2017 ====
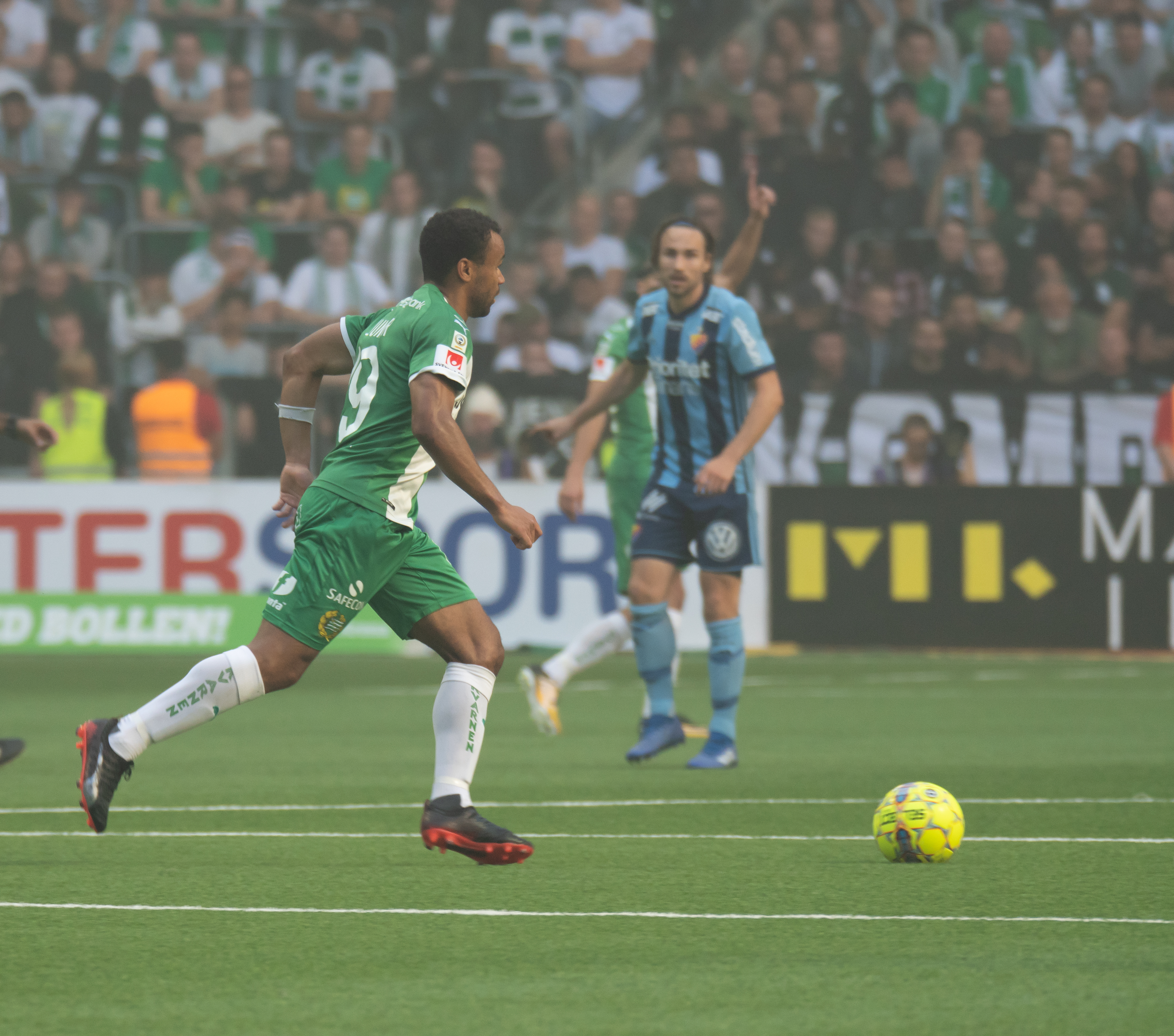
Martinsson Ngouali in a match against Djurgårdens IF in September 2018

On 16 March 2017, he moved to the fellow Stockholm-based team Hammarby IF. Martinsson Ngouali signed a three-year deal with the Allsvenskan club. He rejoined his former manager Stefan Billborn and former teammate Pablo Piñones Arce at Hammarby, now both working as assistant managers at said club.

He made his competitive debut for the club on 3 April, on the first match day of Allsvenskan 2017. Martinsson Ngouali got sent off late in the second half as Hammarby lost 1–2 against IFK Norrköping. He scored his first goal for Hammarby on 7 May in an away fixture against Östersund, netting in a 2–1 loss. Midway through his first season at Hammarby, Junior received much praise from the club's director of football Jesper Jansson, who complimented him as a "real class player" with a strong defensive game and great ability to cover big surfaces on the pitch. On 21 August, in a 3–0 away win against Örebro SK, Martinsson Ngouali attracted a serious thigh injury that kept him out of play for almost two months. He returned to the pitch on 16 October, in a 0–2 away loss against Kalmar FF.

==== 2018 ====
On 12 February 2018, Junior extended his contract for another half year, with the new deal running until June 2020. He played 26 league games for Hammarby, scoring once, as the club finished 4th in the table. He suffered a serious cruciate ligament injury in October, in a 2–1 loss against Malmö FF, with an expected return in the summer of 2019. At the end of 2018, Martinsson Ngouali was voted Hammarby Player of the Year by the fans of the club and also featured in the official Allsvenskan Team of the Year.

==== 2019 ====
Martinsson Ngouali spent the first half of the 2019 season nursing his serious knee injury. He made his comeback on 15 September in a 6–2 home win against IFK Göteborg. He eventually played 8 games, scoring once, as Hammarby finished 3rd in the table.

==== 2020 ====
He had difficulties breaking into the side as a regular in 2020, as the club disappointedly finished 8th in the table. On 9 December, it was announced that Martinsson Ngouali would leave the club at the end of the year, as his contract expired.

=== HNK Gorica ===
On 15 February 2021, Martinsson Ngouali signed a one-and-a-half-year contract with Prva HNL club HNK Gorica, linking up with Jiloan Hamad, his former teammate from Hammarby.

== International career ==
Martinsson Ngouali won 12 caps for the Swedish under-19 national team between 2009 and 2011. On March 24, 2011, he also made a single appearance for the Swedish under-21s in a 1–3 loss against Italy.

In the summer of 2016, he was approached by the Gabonese national football team when manager José Antonio Camacho invited him to a training camp. He was eventually called up to the final squad ahead of the 2017 Africa Cup of Nations. Martinsson Ngouali made his debut for Gabon in a 1–1 draw against Burkina Faso on 18 January 2017 in said tournament.

== Career statistics ==
=== Club ===
As of 6 September 2024

Appearances and goals by club, season and competition
Club	Season	League			National Cup		Continental		Total	
Club	Season	Division	Apps	Goals	Apps	Goals	Apps	Goals	Apps	Goals
IF Brommapojkarna	2010	Allsvenskan	12	0	2	0	—		14	0
IF Brommapojkarna	2011	Superettan	28	1	3	0	—		31	1
IF Brommapojkarna	2012	Superettan	29	1	1	0	—		30	1
IF Brommapojkarna	2013	Allsvenskan	28	1	5	0	—		33	1
IF Brommapojkarna	2014	Allsvenskan	28	1	3	0	5 (Note: Appearance(s) in UEFA Europa League)	0	36	1
IF Brommapojkarna	2015	Superettan	23	0	3	1	—		26	1
IF Brommapojkarna	2016	Ettan	24	7	4	1	—		28	8
IF Brommapojkarna	Total		172	11	21	2	5	0	198	13
Hammarby IF	2017	Allsvenskan	21	1	3	1	—		24	2
Hammarby IF	2018	Allsvenskan	26	1	0	0	—		26	1
Hammarby IF	2019	Allsvenskan	8	1	1	0	—		9	1
Hammarby IF	2020	Allsvenskan	18	0	1	0	1	0	20	0
Hammarby IF	Total		73	3	5	1	1	0	79	4
HNK Gorica	2020-21	HNL	11	0	1	0	—		12	0
HNK Gorica	2021-22	HNL	12	0	2	0	—		14	0
HNK Gorica	Total		23	0	3	0	—		26	0
Sarpsborg 08	2022	Eliteserien	29	1	2	0	—		31	1
Sarpsborg 08	2023	Eliteserien	23	2	3	0	—		26	2
Sarpsborg 08	2024	Eliteserien	10	0	—		—		10	0
Sarpsborg 08	Total		62	3	5	0	—		67	3
IF Brommapojkarna	2024	Allsvenskan	1	0	—		—		1	0
Career Total			331	17	34	3	6	0	371	20

=== International ===
Appearances and goals by national team and year
National team	Year	Apps	Goals
Gabon	2017	4	0
Gabon	2018	3	0
Gabon	2019	2	0
Gabon	2020	1	0
Gabon	2021	2	0
Gabon	2022	4	0
Total		16	0

== Honours ==
Individual

- Hammarby IF Player of the Year: 2018
