= Rebin Asaad =

Swedish footballer (born 1994)

Personal information
- Date of birth: 31 October 1994 (age 32)
- Place of birth: Trollhättan, Sweden
- Height: 1.75 m (5 ft 9 in)
- Position: Midfielder

Team information
- Current team: Österlen FF
- Number: 7

Youth career
- Malmö FF

Senior career*
Years	Team	Apps	(Gls)
2012	BK Olympic	16	(3)
2013–2015	Ängelholms FF	63	(3)
2016–2017	Halmstads BK	26	(1)
2017–2018	Hammarby IF	10	(0)
2018	→ IK Frej (loan)	5	(0)
2019–2020	Varbergs BoIS	21	(0)
2020	Torns IF	30	(4)
2021	Lunds BK	28	(5)
2022–	Österlen FF	26	(8)
- * Club domestic league appearances and goals as of 20:32, 21 December 2022 (UTC)

Rebin Asaad (born 31 October 1994) is a Swedish professional footballer who plays as a midfielder for Österlen FF.

== Early life ==
Asaad was born in Trollhättan, Sweden, to Iraqi parents of Kurdish descent. At age four, his family moved to Malmö where he grew up. Asaad started his football career at a small local club, before joining city giants Malmö FF during his early teens.

== Career ==
Asaad was released by Malmö FF at the end of the 2011 season, since he was not offered a senior contract at the side. In 2012, he played one season with the fourth tier side BK Olympic.

In early 2013, Asaad signed a contract with Ängelholms FF in Superettan. He was used sparingly in his first season at the club, before breaking in to the starting eleven in 2014. Across three full seasons at Ängelholm, Asaad made 63 appearances, scoring 3 goals.

Ahead of the 2016 season, Asaad went on trial with Helsingborgs IF in the Swedish first division. After a week of training, manager Henrik Larsson however did not offer Asaad a contract. Instead, he signed with Halmstads BK in Superettan. In 2016, he played 21 games as a central midfielder, scoring once, as Halmstad won a promotion to Allsvenskan. Asaad was used sparingly during the first half of the 2017 season. He only featured five times as a substitute when Halmstad returned to top flight football.

On 23 July 2017, Asaad moved to Hammarby IF, reportedly on a free transfer. Asaad signed a 1.5-year contract, with an option for a further, with the Stockholm-based club. He made his debut for the side on 13 August, starting as a central midfielder, in a 2–2 home draw against Östersund.

In 2018, Asaad was used sparingly by Hammarby without making any league appearances. On 11 August, he got sent on loan for the remainder of the season to affiliated club IK Frej in Superettan. Asaad left Hammarby in December 2018 upon the expiration of his contract.

On 26 January 2021, Asaad moved to Lunds BK.

== International career ==
During 2015, Asaad attracted interest from the Iraqi national football team. He was called up to train with the side on several occasions the same year.

Asaad was called up to the preliminary Iraqi under-23 squad ahead of the 2016 Summer Olympics in Brazil. However, he did not feature in the main tournament after being dropped from the squad by manager Abdul Ghani Shahad.

Rebin Asaad earned his first call-up to the Iraqi senior national team in October 2017, ahead of a friendly against Syria on 13 November.

== Personal life ==
Alan Asaad, his younger brother born in 1998, is also a professional footballer playing for Degerfors IF in Superettan, Sweden's second tier. His older brother Nazad Asaad, born in 1988, is a retired footballer that belonged to the academy of Udinese Calcio in Serie A between 2005 and 2007 and later went on to make 3 appearances in the Polish Ekstraklasa for ŁKS Łódź.
