= Vladimir Rodić =

Montenegrin footballer (born 1993)

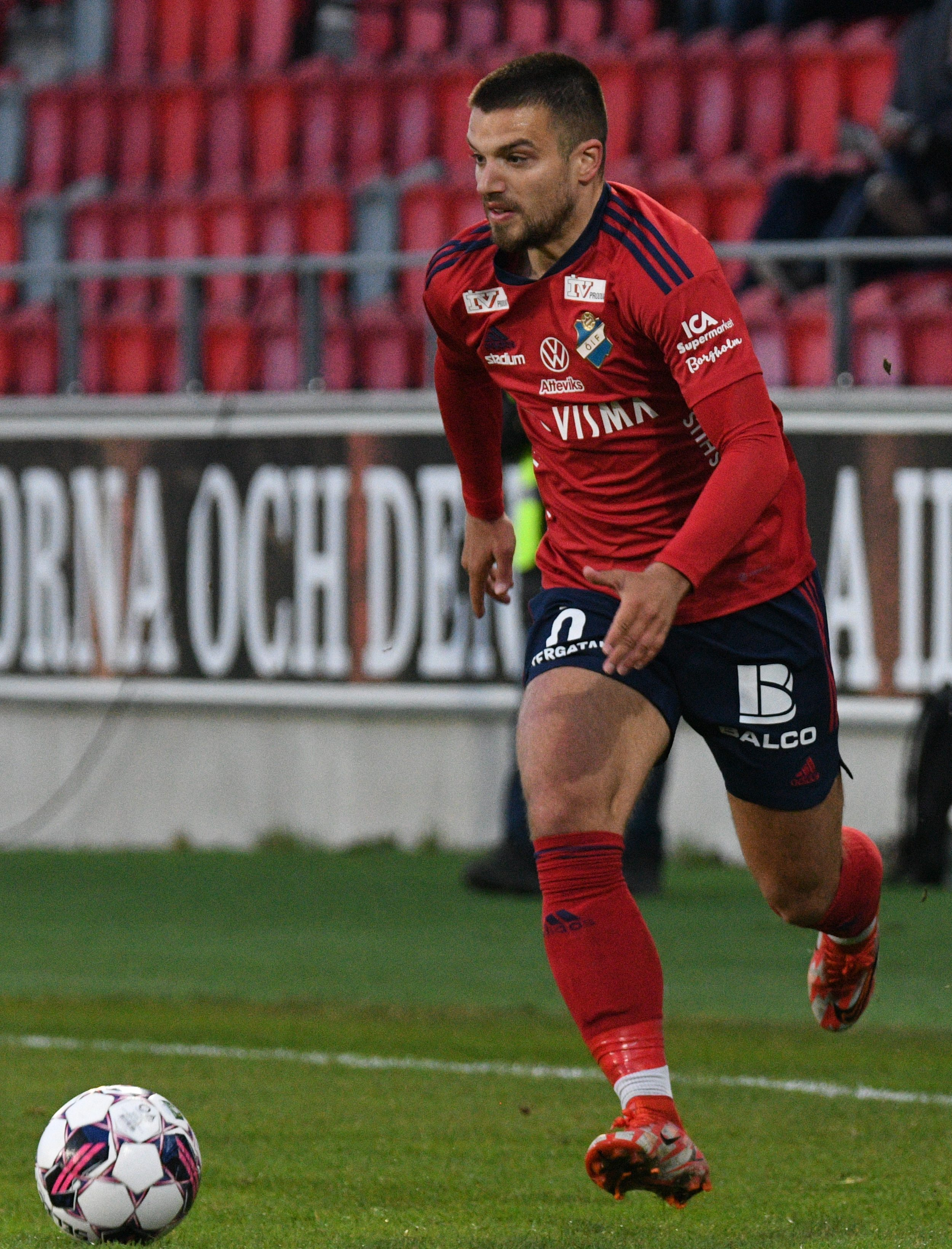
- Rodić with Öster in 2022

Personal information
- Full name: Vladimir Rodić
- Date of birth: 7 September 1993 (age 33)
- Place of birth: Belgrade, FR Yugoslavia
- Height: 1.76 m (5 ft 9 1/2 in)
- Positions: Left midfielder; right midfielder

Team information
- Current team: Bukhara
- Number: 78

Youth career
- Grafičar Beograd
- 2010–2012: Rad

Senior career*
| Years | Team | Apps | (Gls) |
| 2012–2015 | Rad | 46 | (5) |
| 2012 | → Palić (loan) | 11 | (1) |
| 2012 | → BASK (loan) | 14 | (3) |
| 2013 | → Srem Jakovo (loan) | 13 | (3) |
| 2015–2016 | Malmö FF | 21 | (5) |
| 2016–2017 | Karabükspor | 6 | (0) |
| 2017 | → Rad (loan) | 16 | (1) |
| 2017–2018 | Randers | 12 | (1) |
| 2018 | Silkeborg | 14 | (6) |
| 2018–2021 | Hammarby | 73 | (10) |
| 2020 | → Odd (loan) | 10 | (0) |
| 2022–2025 | Öster | 96 | (15) |
| 2026– | Bukhara | 14 | (2) |

International career^{‡}
| 2015–2016 | Montenegro | 5 | (0) |
- * Club domestic league appearances and goals as of 28 July 2026 ‡ National team caps and goals as of 2 April 2016

Vladimir Rodić (Serbian Cyrillic: Владимир Родић, pronounced [roːditɕ]; born 7 September 1993) is a professional footballer who plays as a midfielder for Bukhara. Born in Serbia, he has represented the Montenegro national team.

== Club career ==
=== FK Rad ===
In 2012, Rodić started his senior career with FK Rad in the Serbian SuperLiga. He enjoyed three loan spells at different clubs in Belgrade during the next two years, before establishing himself as a starter for the side.

=== Malmö FF ===
On 8 July 2015, Rodić transferred to Malmö FF in Allsvenskan, Sweden's first division, signing a three-and-a-half-year contract. He reportedly turned down a move to Atlético Madrid. He enjoyed a successful start at his new club, scoring against Red Bull Salzburg in the second qualifying round (3–2 on aggregate), as Malmö FF went through to the group stage of the 2015–16 UEFA Champions League.

=== Karabükspor ===
On 22 July 2016, Rodić moved to Karabükspor in the TFF First League, for an undisclosed fee, after being deemed surplus to requirements at Malmö FF. However, he had difficulties breaking in to the first-team at his new side, and was sent on loan to his former club FK Rad.

=== Randers FC ===
On 31 August 2017, Rodić signed a one-year deal with Randers FC in the Danish Superliga. He immediately made an impact at his new club, and signed a two-year contract extension on 15 November the same year. Rodić made 13 appearances and scored one goal, throughout the first half of the season as the club competed in the bottom half of the table, before leaving on 31 January 2018, the final day of the winter transfer window.

=== Silkeborgs IF ===
On 31 January 2018, Rodić moved to Silkeborg IF. He was awarded as the club's Player of the Month in both April and May, but was unable to save the club from a relegation from the Danish Superliga after losing to Esbjerg fB in the final round of the play-offs. In total, Rodić made 23 appearances for Silkeborg and scored seven goals.

=== Hammarby IF ===
On 7 August 2018, he transferred to Hammarby IF, thus returning for a second stint in the Swedish Allsvenskan. Rodić signed a three-and-a-half-year deal with Hammarby, for a reported club record fee of around 5 million Swedish kronor (approximately £0,5 million). Linking up with compatriot Nikola Đurđić, his former teammate from Malmö and Randers, Rodić established himself as a starter as the club finished 4th in the 2018 Allsvenskan table, scoring three goals in 14 appearances.

After mainly being used as a substitute player throughout the first half of the 2019 season, Rodić came in to form in September by scoring six goals in just three games, most notably a brace against rivals AIK (in a 2–1 win) and a hat-trick against Örebro SK (in a 5–1 win). Rodić played 21 league games as the club finished 3rd in Allsvenskan after eight straight wins at the end of the season.

In 2020, Rodić made 17 league appearances for Hammarby, mostly as a substitute player. On 5 October the same year, he was sent on loan to Norwegian Eliteserien club Odds BK for the remainder of the year.

On 30 May 2021, Rodić won the 2020–21 Svenska Cupen, the main domestic cup, with Hammarby through a 5–4 win on penalties (0–0 after full-time) against BK Häcken in the final. Rodić made four appearances as the side reached the play-off round of the 2021–22 UEFA Europa Conference League, after eliminating Maribor (4–1 on aggregate) and FK Čukarički (6–4 on aggregate), where the club was knocked out by Basel on penalties (4–4 on aggregate). At the end of the year, it was announced that Rodić would leave the club at the expiration of his contract.

=== Östers IF ===
On 26 February 2022, Rodić signed a two-year contract with Östers IF in Superettan, Sweden's second tier.

== International career ==
On 2 October 2015, he got a first call-up by Branko Brnović to the Montenegro national football team. He made his debut in a 2016 European Championship qualification match against Austria in Podgorica. He has won five caps in total, scoring no goals, and his final international was a March 2016 friendly match against Belarus.

== Career statistics ==
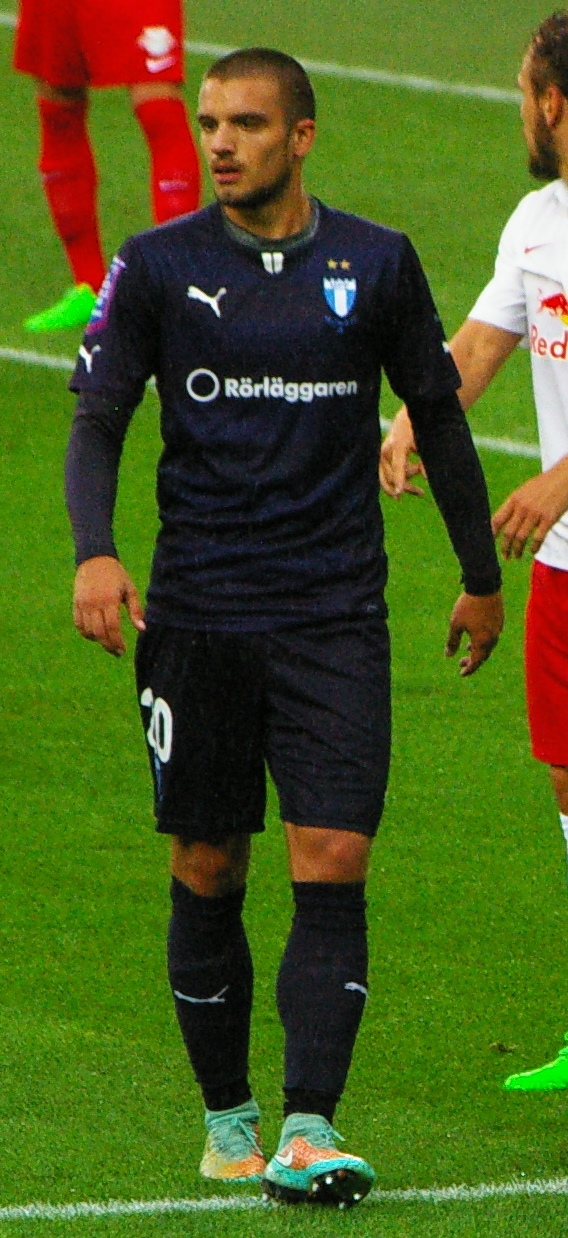
Rodić playing for Malmö FF in 2015.

As of 28 November 2021.

| Club | Season | League | | | Cup | | Continental | | Total | |
| Club | Season | Division | Apps | Goals | Apps | Goals | Apps | Goals | Apps | Goals |
|---|---|---|---|---|---|---|---|---|---|---|
| Palić (loan) | 2011–12 | | 11 | 1 | — | | — | | 11 | 1 |
| Palić (loan) | Total | | 11 | 1 | 0 | 0 | 0 | 0 | 11 | 1 |
| BASK (loan) | 2012–13 | | 14 | 3 | — | | — | | 14 | 3 |
| BASK (loan) | Total | | 14 | 3 | 0 | 0 | 0 | 0 | 14 | 3 |
| Srem Jakovo (loan) | 2012–13 | | 13 | 3 | — | | — | | 13 | 3 |
| Srem Jakovo (loan) | Total | | 13 | 3 | 0 | 0 | 0 | 0 | 13 | 3 |
| Rad | 2013–14 | Serbian SuperLiga | 16 | 1 | 1 | 0 | — | | 17 | 1 |
| Rad | 2014–15 | Serbian SuperLiga | 30 | 4 | 3 | 0 | — | | 33 | 4 |
| Rad | Total | | 46 | 5 | 4 | 0 | 0 | 0 | 50 | 5 |
| Malmö FF | 2015 | Allsvenskan | 13 | 4 | 0 | 0 | 10 (Note: Appearances in UEFA Champions League) | 1 | 23 | 5 |
| Malmö FF | 2016 | Allsvenskan | 8 | 1 | 6 | 2 | — | | 14 | 3 |
| Malmö FF | Total | | 21 | 5 | 6 | 2 | 10 | 1 | 37 | 8 |
| Kardemir Karabükspor | 2016–17 | Süper Lig | 6 | 0 | 1 | 0 | 0 | 0 | 7 | 0 |
| Kardemir Karabükspor | Total | | 6 | 0 | 1 | 0 | 0 | 0 | 7 | 0 |
| Rad (loan) | 2016–17 | Serbian SuperLiga | 16 | 1 | 0 | 0 | — | | 16 | 1 |
| Rad (loan) | Total | | 16 | 1 | 0 | 0 | 0 | 0 | 16 | 1 |
| Randers FC | 2017–18 | Danish Superliga | 12 | 1 | 1 | 0 | — | | 13 | 1 |
| Randers FC | Total | | 12 | 1 | 1 | 0 | 0 | 0 | 13 | 1 |
| Silkeborg IF | 2017–18 | Danish Superliga | 12 | 6 | 9 | 1 | — | | 21 | 7 |
| Silkeborg IF | 2018–19 | Danish Superliga | 2 | 0 | 0 | 0 | — | | 2 | 0 |
| Silkeborg IF | Total | | 14 | 6 | 9 | 1 | 0 | 0 | 23 | 7 |
| Hammarby IF | 2018 | Allsvenskan | 14 | 3 | 1 | 1 | — | | 15 | 4 |
| Hammarby IF | 2019 | Allsvenskan | 21 | 6 | 3 | 0 | — | | 24 | 6 |
| Hammarby IF | 2020 | Allsvenskan | 17 | 0 | 1 | 0 | 1 (Note: Appearances in UEFA Europa League) | 0 | 19 | 0 |
| Hammarby IF | 2021 | Allsvenskan | 20 | 1 | 7 | 3 | 4 (Note: Appearances in UEFA Europa Conference League) | 0 | 31 | 4 |
| Hammarby IF | Total | | 73 | 10 | 12 | 4 | 5 | 0 | 90 | 14 |
| Odd (loan) | 2020 | Eliteserien | 10 | 0 | 0 | 0 | — | | 10 | 0 |
| Odd (loan) | Total | | 10 | 0 | 0 | 0 | 0 | 0 | 10 | 0 |
| Career total | | | 236 | 35 | 33 | 7 | 15 | 1 | 284 | 43 |

== Honours ==
Malmö FF

- Allsvenskan: 2016

Hammarby IF

- Svenska Cupen: 2020–21
