= David Fällman =

Swedish footballer (born 1990)

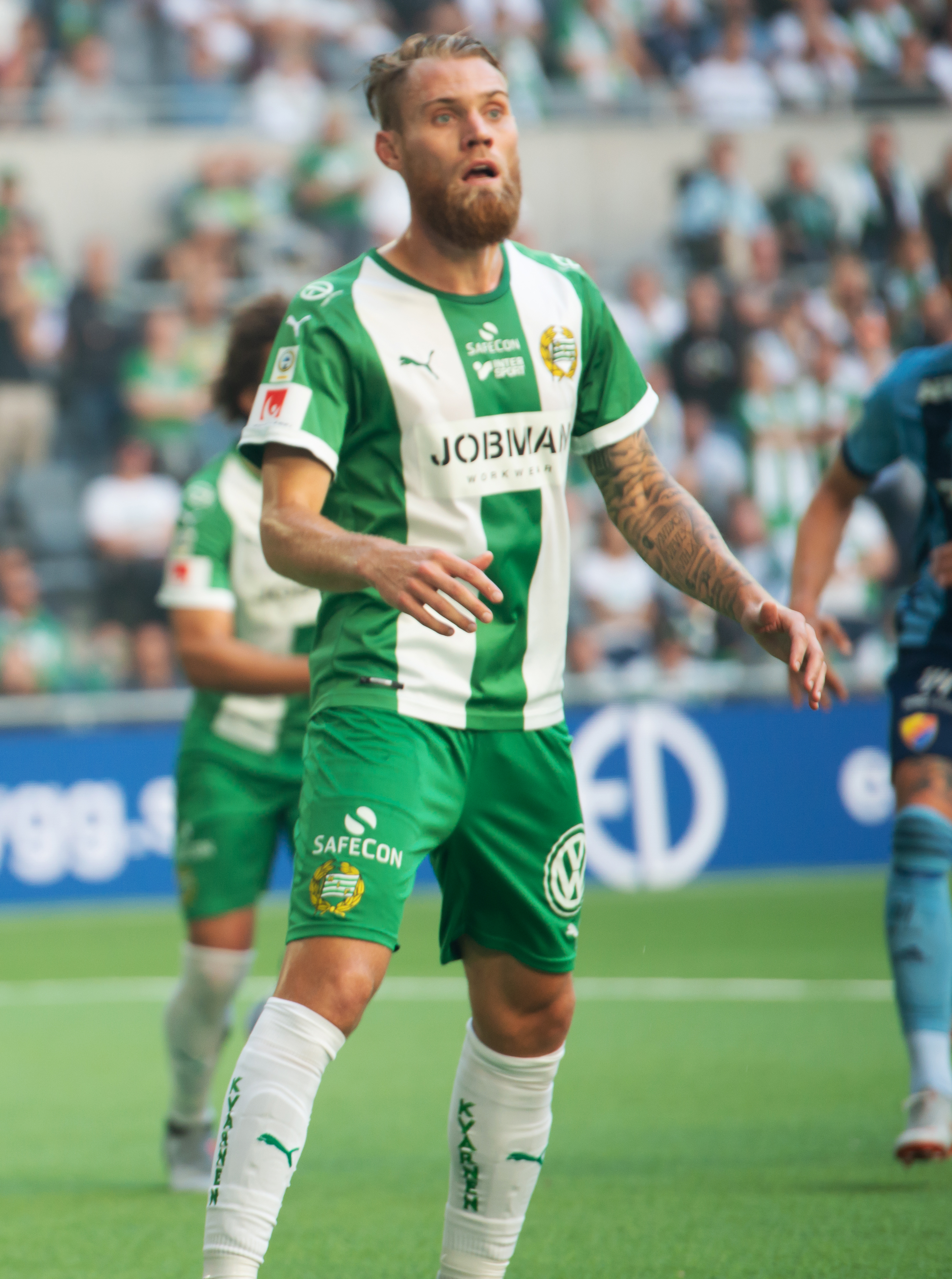
- Fällman with Hammarby IF in 2018

Personal information
- Full name: David Thomas Fällman
- Date of birth: 4 February 1990 (age 36)
- Place of birth: Stockholm, Sweden
- Height: 1.87 m (6 ft 2 in)
- Position: Defender

Team information
- Current team: Stockholm Internazionale
- Number: 5

Youth career
- IFK Mariefred
- Triangelns IK

Senior career*
Years	Team	Apps	(Gls)
2007–2008	Eskilstuna City	21	(2)
2009–2011	Väsby United	67	(0)
2012	AIK	0	(0)
2012–2015	Gefle IF	111	(1)
2016–2017	Dalian Transcendence	55	(0)
2018–2021	Hammarby IF	70	(1)
2021–2023	Aalesund	74	(2)
2024–	Stockholm Internazionale	84	(6)
- * Club domestic league appearances and goals as of 16 November 2026

David Thomas Fällman (born 4 February 1990) is a Swedish professional footballer who plays for Stockholm Internazionale as a defender.

== Club career ==
=== Early career ===
Fällman grew up in Mariefred, and started his senior career in 2007 with Eskilstuna City in Division 2, Sweden's fourth tier.

He moved to Stockholm-based Väsby United in 2009. Across three seasons, Fällman played as a regular in Superettan, Sweden's second tier, with the club and made 67 league appearances.

In the beginning of 2012, Fällman signed a three-month deal with AIK, but was not offered a contract extension with the club.

=== Gefle IF ===
On 21 March 2012, Fällman signed a multi-year contract with Gefle IF in Allsvenskan.

He soon established himself as a key player in manager Pelle Olsson's side, and he was named the new club captain in 2015.

In total, Fällman made 111 league appearances for Gelfe IF across four seasons in the Swedish top division.

=== Dalian Transcendence ===
In January 2016, Fällman moved abroad for the first time in his career, signing a two-year deal with Dalian Transcendence in the China League One.

=== Hammarby IF ===
On 16 February 2018, Fällman returned to Sweden and signed a three-year deal with Hammarby IF. He played 27 games during his debut season, scoring once, as Hammarby finished 4th in the table.

In April 2019, Fällman was appointed joint-captain of Hammarby together with Jeppe Andersen. His season was however plagued by a groin injury, and Fällman only made 18 appearances as Hammarby finished 3rd in Allsvenskan.

=== Aalesunds FK ===
On 15 February 2021, Fällman completed a transfer to Aalesunds FK.

=== Stockholm Internazionale ===
On 25 January 2024, Fällman signed with Ettan-Norra club FC Stockholm Internazionale.

== Personal life ==
Fällman is the cousin of Marcus Danielson, a fellow footballer that has represented the Sweden national team.
