= Junes Barny =

Swedish footballer

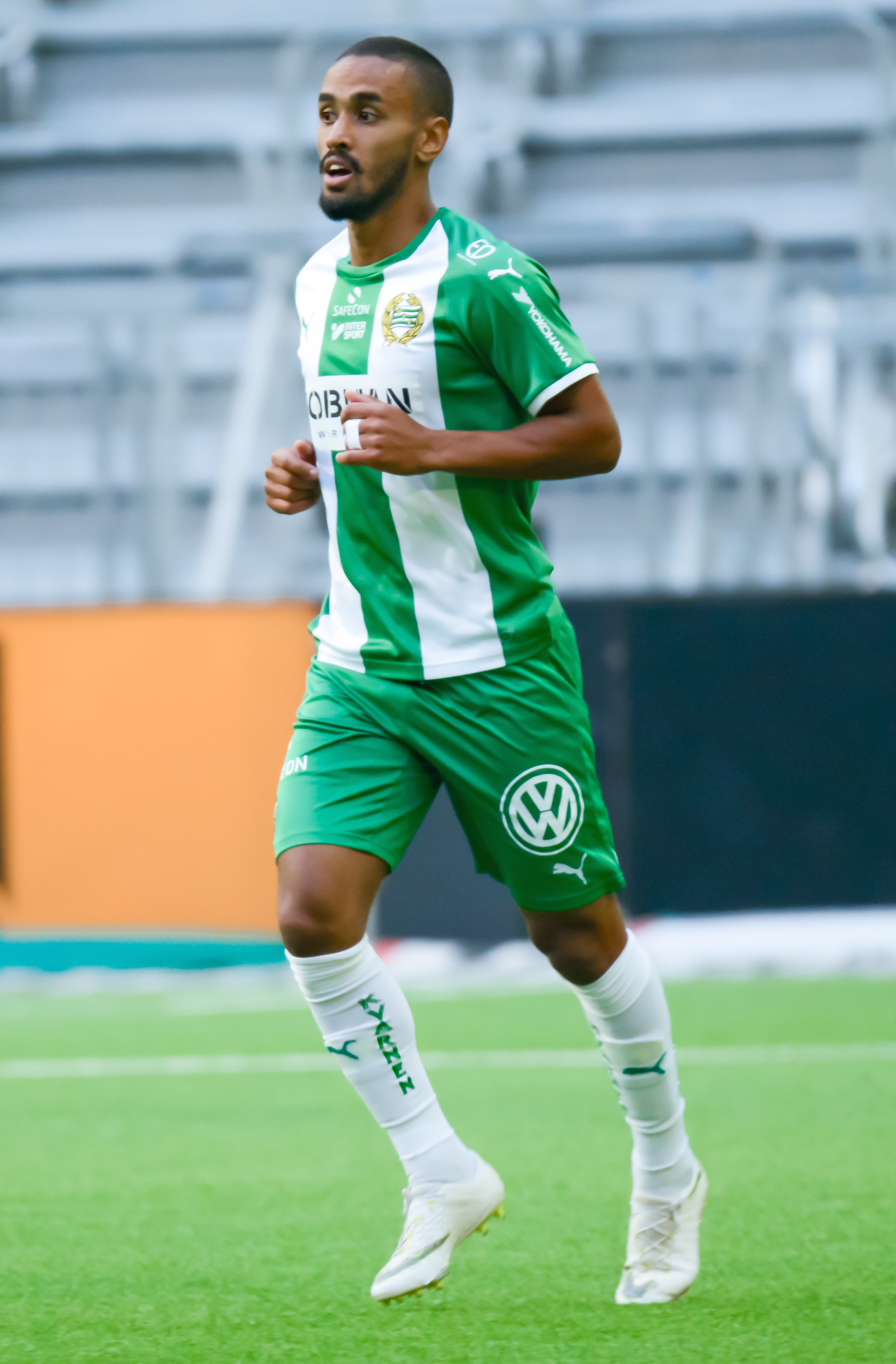
- Barny with Hammarby IF in 2018

Personal information
- Full name: Junes Barny
- Date of birth: 4 November 1989 (age 37)
- Place of birth: Helsingborg, Sweden
- Height: 1.77 m (5 ft 10 in)
- Position: Midfielder

Team information
- Current team: Juventud Torremolinos (manager)

Youth career
- Påarps GIF
- –2008: Helsingborgs IF

Senior career*
| Years | Team | Apps | (Gls) |
| 2008–2012 | Högaborgs BK | 42 | (8) |
| 2013–2014 | Ängelholms FF | 46 | (15) |
| 2015–2016 | Halmstads BK | 42 | (4) |
| 2016–2017 | Difaâ d'El-Jadida | 4 | (0) |
| 2018 | GAIS | 12 | (0) |
| 2018 | Hammarby IF | 13 | (1) |
| 2019 | IFK Göteborg | 9 | (0) |
| 2020 | Varbergs BoIS | 14 | (3) |
| 2021 | Enosis Neon Paralimni | 16 | (1) |
| 2021–2022 | Jönköpings Södra | 29 | (0) |
| 2024–2025 | Högaborgs BK | 26 | (5) |

Managerial career
- 2026: Juventud Torremolinos (assistant)
- 2026: Juventud Torremolinos (caretaker)
- 2026–: Juventud Torremolinos
- * Club domestic league appearances and goals

Junes Barny (Arabic: يونس بارني yūnis bārnī, IPA: [juːnɪs baːrniː]; born 4 November 1989) is a Swedish football manager and former player who played as a midfielder. He is the current manager of Spanish club Juventud de Torremolinos CF.

Barny is of Moroccan descent.

== Career ==
On 13 July 2018, Barny signed a short-term deal with Hammarby IF in Allsvenskan. He scored his first goal for the club on 27 August, in a 3–2 away win against Dalkurd FF.

On 31 January 2019, Barny signed a two-year contract with IFK Göteborg, with an option for a further year. In June 2019, Barny he left the club. In August 2020, Barny moved to Varbergs BoIS, where he signed a six-month contract. In January 2021, Barny signed with Cypriot First Division club Enosis Neon Paralimni. On 10 August 2021, Barny signed with Jönköpings Södra on a free transfer, penning a contract until December 2023.

== Personal life ==
Barny is a dual national; he holds a Swedish EU passport as well as a Moroccan passport.
