= 2018 Allsvenskan =

94th season of Allsvenskan

Allsvenskan
- Season: 2018
- Champions: AIK; 6th Allsvenskan title 12th Swedish championship title
- Relegated: IF Brommapojkarna; Dalkurd FF; Trelleborgs FF
- Champions League: AIK
- Europa League: IFK Norrköping; Malmö FF; Häcken (Via Svenska Cupen)
- Top goalscorer: Paulinho (20 goals)
- Biggest home win: BK Häcken 6–0 IF Brommapojkarna (26 August 2018)
- Biggest away win: Trelleborgs FF 1–6 GIF Sundsvall (13 August 2018); Dalkurd FF 0–5 Häcken (27 October 2018)
- Highest scoring: Östersunds FK 5–2 IK Sirius (23 May 2018); Trelleborgs FF 1–6 GIF Sundsvall (13 August 2018)
- Longest winning run: 8 matches AIK; Malmö FF
- Longest unbeaten run: 20 matches AIK
- Longest winless run: 19 matches Trelleborgs FF
- Longest losing run: 6 matches Trelleborgs FF
- Highest attendance: 50,128; AIK 0–0 GIF Sundsvall (4 November 2018)
- Lowest attendance: 202; Dalkurd FF 0–5 BK Häcken (27 October 2018)
- Average attendance: 8,423

The 2018 Allsvenskan, part of the 2018 Swedish football season, was the 94th season of Allsvenskan since its establishment in 1924. A total of 16 teams participated. As the 2018 FIFA World Cup will start on 14 June, the last round before stoppage will be held on 27 May. The league will resume games on 7 July.

Malmö FF were the defending champions after winning the title in the previous season. AIK won the Swedish championship this season, their sixth Allsvenskan title and 12th Swedish championship overall, in the 30th round on 11 November when they won 0–1 in the away fixture against Kalmar FF at Guldfågeln Arena.

== Teams ==
Location of teams in 2018 Allsvenskan
Locations of Stockholm Teams in the 2018 Allsvenskan

A total of sixteen teams are contesting the league, including thirteen sides from the previous season, two promoted teams from the 2017 Superettan and one team from the 2017 Allsvenskan play-offs.

Halmstads BK and AFC Eskilstuna were relegated at the end of the 2017 season after finishing in the bottom two places of the table. They were replaced by 2017 Superettan champions IF Brommapojkarna and runners-up Dalkurd FF. IF Brommapojkarna returned to Allsvenskan after three years' absence, having been relegated at the end of the 2014 season. This is IF Brommapojkarna's sixth season in the league. Dalkurd FF are participating in the league for the first time in the club's history; they are the fourth new club in the last five Allsvenskan seasons (following Falkenbergs FF in 2014, Östersunds FK in 2016 and AFC Eskilstuna in 2017).

The final spot was taken by the 2017 Allsvenskan play-offs winner; Trelleborgs FF, third-placed team in 2017 Superettan, who replace Jönköpings Södra IF.

=== Stadia and locations ===
Team	Location	Stadium	Turf^{1}	Stadium capacity^{1}
AIK	Stockholm	Friends Arena	Natural	50,000
BK Häcken	Gothenburg	Bravida Arena	Artificial	6,500
Dalkurd FF	Gävle	Gavlevallen	Artificial	6,500
Djurgårdens IF	Stockholm	Tele2 Arena	Artificial	30,000
GIF Sundsvall	Sundsvall	Idrottsparken	Artificial	7,700
Hammarby IF	Stockholm	Tele2 Arena	Artificial	30,000
IF Brommapojkarna	Stockholm	Grimsta IP	Artificial	8,000
IF Elfsborg	Borås	Borås Arena	Artificial	16,899
IFK Göteborg	Gothenburg	Gamla Ullevi	Natural	18,600
IFK Norrköping	Norrköping	Nya Parken	Artificial	15,734
IK Sirius	Uppsala	Studenternas IP	Natural	6,300
Kalmar FF	Kalmar	Guldfågeln Arena	Natural	12,000
Malmö FF	Malmö	Stadion	Natural	22,500
Örebro SK	Örebro	Behrn Arena	Artificial	12,300
Östersunds FK	Östersund	Jämtkraft Arena	Artificial	8,466
Trelleborgs FF	Trelleborg	Vångavallen	Natural	7,000

- ^{1} According to each club information page at the Swedish Football Association website for Allsvenskan.

=== Personnel and sponsoring ===
All teams are obligated to have the logo of the league sponsor Svenska Spel as well as the Allsvenskan logo on the right sleeve of their shirt.

Note: Flags indicate national team as has been defined under FIFA eligibility rules. Players and Managers may hold more than one non-FIFA nationality.

Team	Head coach^{1}	Captain	Kit manufacturer	Main shirt sponsor
AIK	(Sweden) Rikard Norling	(Eritrea) Henok Goitom	Nike	Notar
BK Häcken	(Sweden) Andreas Alm	(Sweden) Rasmus Lindgren	Nike	BRA Bygg
Dalkurd FF	(Sweden) Johan Sandahl	(Sweden) Peshraw Azizi	Adidas	Min Stora Dag
Djurgårdens IF	(Sweden) Özcan Melkemichel	(Sweden) Jonas Olsson	Adidas	Prioritet Finans
GIF Sundsvall	(Sweden) Joel Cedergren	(Sweden) Tommy Naurin	Adidas	SCA
Hammarby IF	(Sweden) Stefan Billborn	(Sweden) Kennedy Bakircioglu	Puma	Jobman
IF Brommapojkarna	(Sweden) Roberth Björknesjö	(Sweden) Gustav Sandberg Magnusson	Nike	Bauhaus
IF Elfsborg	(Sweden) Jimmy Thelin	(Denmark) Kevin Stuhr Ellegaard	Umbro	Pulsen
IFK Göteborg	(Sweden) Poya Asbaghi	(Sweden) David Boo Wiklander	Kappa	Prioritet Finans
IFK Norrköping	(Sweden) Jens Gustafsson	(Sweden) Andreas Johansson	Nike	Holmen
IK Sirius	(Sweden) Kim Bergstrand	(Nigeria) Moses Ogbu	Nike	Various
Kalmar FF	(Sweden) Nanne Bergstrand	(Sweden) Viktor Elm	Hummel	Hjältevadshus
Malmö FF	(Germany) Uwe Rösler	(Sweden) Markus Rosenberg	Puma	Volkswagen
Trelleborgs FF	(Sweden) Patrick Winqvist	(Sweden) Salif Camara Jönsson	Nike	Mellby Gård
Örebro SK	(Sweden) Axel Kjäll	(Sweden) Nordin Gerzić	Puma	Ambitiös
Östersunds FK	(England) Ian Burchnall	(Sweden) Tom Pettersson	Adidas	Various

=== Managerial changes ===
Team	Outgoing manager	Manner of departure	Date of vacancy	Table	Incoming manager	Date of appointment
IFK Göteborg	(Sweden) Alf Westerberg	End of caretaker spell	November 20, 2017	Pre-season	(Sweden) Poya Asbaghi	November 21, 2017
IF Brommapojkarna	(Sweden) Olof Mellberg	Resigned	November 21, 2017	Pre-season	(Portugal) Luís Pimenta	December 13, 2017
BK Häcken	(Sweden) Mikael Stahre	Resigned	November 26, 2017	Pre-season	(Sweden) Andreas Alm	December 8, 2017
IF Elfsborg	(Sweden) Nemanja Miljanović (Sweden) Janne Mian	End of caretaker spell	December 6, 2017	Pre-season	(Sweden) Jimmy Thelin	December 6, 2017
Hammarby IF	(Denmark) Jakob Michelsen	Sacked	January 4, 2018	Pre-season	(Sweden) Stefan Billborn	January 10, 2018
Dalkurd FF	(Sweden) Andreas Brännström	Sacked	January 8, 2018	Pre-season	(Bosnia and Herzegovina) Azrudin Valentić	January 8, 2018
Malmö FF	(Sweden) Magnus Pehrsson	Sacked	May 14, 2018	10th	(Sweden) Daniel Andersson (caretaker)	May 14, 2018
Dalkurd FF	(Bosnia and Herzegovina) Azrudin Valentić	Sacked	May 25, 2018	16th	(Sweden) Adil Kizil (caretaker)	May 25, 2018
Östersunds FK	(England) Graham Potter	Signed by Swansea City	June 4, 2018	6th	(England) Ian Burchnall (caretaker)	June 4, 2018
Malmö FF	(Sweden) Daniel Andersson	End of caretaker spell	June 12, 2018	10th	(Germany) Uwe Rösler	June 12, 2018
Dalkurd FF	(Sweden) Adil Kizil	End of caretaker spell	June 15, 2018	15th	(Sweden) Johan Sandahl	June 15, 2018
Östersunds FK	(England) Ian Burchnall	Caretaker made permanent manager	July 18, 2018	5th	(England) Ian Burchnall	July 18, 2018
IF Brommapojkarna	(Portugal) Luís Pimenta	Sacked	September 5, 2018	14th	(Sweden) Roberth Björknesjö	September 7, 2018

== League table ==
Pos	Team	Pld	W	D	L	GF	GA	GD	Pts	Qualification or relegation
1	AIK (C)	30	19	10	1	50	16	+34	67	Qualification for the Champions League first qualifying round
2	IFK Norrköping	30	19	8	3	51	27	+24	65	Qualification for the Europa League first qualifying round
3	Malmö FF	30	17	7	6	57	29	+28	58	Qualification for the Europa League first qualifying round
4	Hammarby IF	30	17	7	6	56	35	+21	58	
5	BK Häcken	30	16	5	9	58	27	+31	53	Qualification for the Europa League second qualifying round (Note: BK Häcken qualified for the Europa League second qualifying round by winning the 2018–19 Svenska Cupen.)
6	Östersunds FK	30	15	4	11	51	39	+12	49	
7	Djurgårdens IF	30	13	9	8	40	31	+9	48	
8	GIF Sundsvall	30	12	8	10	47	35	+12	44	
9	Örebro SK	30	9	8	13	34	40	−6	35	
10	Kalmar FF	30	9	7	14	27	35	−8	34	
11	IFK Göteborg	30	9	4	17	38	53	−15	31	
12	IF Elfsborg	30	7	9	14	29	41	−12	30	
13	IK Sirius	30	8	6	16	37	61	−24	30	
14	IF Brommapojkarna (R)	30	8	2	20	25	64	−39	26	Qualification for the relegation play-offs
15	Dalkurd FF (R)	30	6	6	18	30	57	−27	24	Relegation to the Superettan
16	Trelleborgs FF (R)	30	3	6	21	24	64	−40	15	Relegation to the Superettan

Source: svenskfotboll.se (in Swedish)
Rules for classification: 1) Points; 2) Goal difference; 3) Goals scored; 4) Head-to-head points; 5) Head-to-head goal difference; 6) Head-to-head away goals scored; 7) Play-off
(Note: Play-off is only played if need to decide champion, teams for relegation or UEFA competition and will be played on a neutral ground).
(C) Champions; (R) Relegated

== Positions by round ==
Team ╲ Round	1	2	3	4	5	6	7	8	9	10	11	12	13	14	15	16	17	18	19	20	21	22	23	24	25	26	27	28	29	30
AIK	3	2	2	2	2	2	2	2	2	3	3	2	1	1	1	1	1	1	1	1	1	1	1	1	1	1	1	1	1	1
IFK Norrköping	4	4	3	4	3	5	4	3	3	2	2	3	3	3	3	3	4	3	3	3	3	2	2	2	3	2	2	2	2	2
Malmö FF	5	5	6	9	8	10	10	11	11	11	12	10	10	8	7	6	6	5	4	4	4	4	4	4	4	4	5	5	4	3
Hammarby IF	1	1	1	1	1	1	1	1	1	1	1	1	2	2	2	2	2	2	2	2	2	3	3	3	2	3	3	3	3	4
BK Häcken	6	11	4	6	7	9	8	7	7	7	9	8	8	10	10	9	8	6	6	8	5	5	5	5	6	5	4	4	5	5
Östersunds FK	13	16	14	11	14	11	11	10	10	9	7	5	5	5	5	4	3	4	5	5	6	6	6	6	5	6	6	6	6	6
Djurgårdens IF	7	6	8	5	6	8	9	9	8	5	4	4	4	4	4	5	5	7	8	7	8	8	8	8	8	8	8	8	7	7
GIF Sundsvall	8	3	5	3	4	3	6	5	5	8	6	9	9	6	6	7	7	8	7	6	7	7	7	7	7	7	7	7	8	8
Örebro SK	9	12	7	8	5	4	3	6	6	4	5	7	7	9	8	10	10	11	10	10	9	9	9	9	9	9	9	9	9	9
Kalmar FF	12	10	11	10	9	6	5	4	4	6	8	6	6	7	9	8	9	9	9	9	10	10	10	10	10	10	10	10	10	10
IFK Göteborg	2	7	9	7	10	7	7	8	9	10	10	12	12	12	11	11	11	10	11	11	11	11	12	12	12	12	13	13	13	11
IF Elfsborg	10	14	16	13	11	12	13	14	14	13	11	11	11	11	12	12	13	13	12	12	12	12	11	11	11	11	11	11	11	12
IK Sirius	14	15	13	12	13	15	16	16	15	15	16	16	16	14	13	13	12	12	13	13	14	14	13	13	13	13	12	12	12	13
IF Brommapojkarna	11	9	12	15	15	16	12	13	12	14	14	14	14	15	15	14	14	14	14	14	13	13	14	14	14	15	15	15	14	14
Dalkurd FF	16	8	10	14	12	13	14	15	16	16	15	15	15	16	16	16	16	15	15	15	15	15	15	15	15	14	14	14	15	15
Trelleborgs FF	15	13	15	16	16	14	15	12	13	12	13	13	13	13	14	15	15	16	16	16	16	16	16	16	16	16	16	16	16	16

Leader
2019–20 UEFA Europa League First qualifying round
Relegation play-offs
Relegation to 2019 Superettan

Source: everysport.com

== Results ==
Home \ Away	AIK	BKH	DFF	DIF	GIFS	HAM	BP	IFE	IFKG	IFKN	IKS	KFF	MFF	TFF	ÖSK	ÖFK
AIK	—	3–0	2–0	2–0	0–0	1–0	5–1	1–0	2–0	3–3	2–0	1–0	1–1	2–0	1–1	1–1
Häcken	1–1	—	3–0	5–0	3–0	2–2	6–0	5–0	4–1	0–1	2–1	1–0	1–1	2–1	1–1	2–0
Dalkurd	0–4	0–5	—	1–2	2–2	2–3	3–0	1–4	1–1	0–2	1–3	1–2	0–1	2–2	1–0	3–0
Djurgården	0–0	2–1	1–0	—	1–1	1–2	0–1	2–2	2–0	1–1	1–0	0–2	3–0	1–1	2–0	0–2
Sundsvall	0–1	0–2	0–1	1–1	—	2–3	3–0	2–1	2–0	1–1	4–0	2–0	2–2	1–0	0–0	2–3
Hammarby	0–1	1–0	4–1	1–3	4–3	—	4–0	0–1	3–0	2–1	3–1	0–0	3–2	1–0	2–0	1–2
Brommapojkarna	0–2	2–0	2–1	1–0	1–3	2–4	—	0–2	0–2	0–1	0–1	2–1	0–3	3–0	0–0	0–4
Elfsborg	0–0	0–3	0–0	2–2	2–0	0–0	1–2	—	1–1	0–1	0–1	1–1	1–2	2–1	1–0	0–2
Göteborg	0–2	2–1	1–0	1–3	1–2	1–2	3–0	2–2	—	0–2	2–3	1–3	0–3	2–2	2–0	2–1
Norrköping	2–0	2–1	4–2	1–1	1–0	0–0	2–1	1–0	2–1	—	1–0	3–1	3–1	1–2	3–2	4–2
Sirius	2–3	0–0	2–3	1–5	1–3	1–1	4–2	4–2	3–2	1–1	—	1–1	0–4	1–1	2–4	0–1
Kalmar	0–1	1–2	0–0	0–1	0–2	1–1	1–1	1–0	2–1	1–2	1–0	—	3–0	2–1	0–1	1–1
Malmö	1–1	2–0	1–1	1–0	0–0	2–1	3–1	2–0	1–2	2–1	5–0	4–0	—	3–0	4–0	1–1
Trelleborg	1–4	0–3	0–1	0–3	1–6	1–3	2–1	2–2	1–3	1–1	1–2	0–1	1–0	—	1–2	0–1
Örebro	1–1	1–2	3–2	1–1	2–1	1–2	0–1	1–2	1–3	1–1	0–0	2–1	1–2	4–0	—	2–1
Östersund	1–2	2–0	3–0	0–1	1–2	3–3	3–1	1–0	2–1	0–2	5–2	2–0	2–3	4–1	0–2	—

Source: Swedish Football Association (in Swedish)
Legend: Blue = home team win; Yellow = draw; Red = away team win.
For upcoming matches, an "a" indicates there is an article about the rivalry between the two participants.

== Play-offs ==
The 14th-placed team of Allsvenskan meets the third-placed team from 2018 Superettan in a two-legged tie on a home-and-away basis with the team from Allsvenskan finishing at home.

22 November 2018
19:00

AFC Eskilstuna	0–1	IF Brommapojkarna
	Report	Lahne 12'

Tunavallen, Eskilstuna
Attendance: 3,465
Referee: Stefan Johannesson

25 November 2018
14:45

IF Brommapojkarna	1–2	AFC Eskilstuna
Öhman 39'	Report	Nnamani 65'; Ajeti 75'

Grimsta IP, Stockholm
Attendance: 1,925
Referee: Andreas Ekberg

2–2 on aggregate. AFC Eskilstuna won on away goals.

== Season statistics ==
=== Top scorers ===
As of 11 November 2018

Rank	Player	Club	Goals
1	(Brazil) Paulinho	BK Häcken	20
2	(Sweden) Linus Hallenius	GIF Sundsvall	18
3	(Serbia) Nikola Đurđić	Hammarby IF	13
3	(United States) Romain Gall	GIFS / MFF	13
3	(Sweden) Markus Rosenberg	Malmö FF	13
6	(Eritrea) Henok Goitom	AIK	12
7	(Sweden) Jiloan Hamad	Hammarby IF	11

=== Hat-tricks ===
Player	For	Against	Result	Date
(Sweden) Jiloan Hamad	Hammarby	Sirius	3–1	1 April 2018
(The Gambia) Pa Dibba	Hammarby	Sundsvall	4–3	5 May 2018
(Brazil) Paulinho	Häcken	Trelleborg	0–3	6 May 2018
(Zimbabwe) Tino Kadewere^{4 goals}	Djurgården	Sirius	1–5	27 May 2018
(Argentina) Nicolás Stefanelli	AIK	Brommapojkarna	5–1	22 July 2018
(Iceland) Elías Már Ómarsson	IFK Göteborg	Brommapojkarna	3–0	28 July 2018
(Sweden) Linus Hallenius	Sundsvall	Trelleborg	1–6	13 August 2018
(Sweden) Dino Islamović	Östersund	Brommapojkarna	3–1	26 September 2018
(Sweden) Philip Haglund	Sirius	Brommapojkarna	4–2	28 October 2018

=== Monthly awards ===
Month	Allsvenskan Player of the Month		Reference
Month	Player	Club	Reference
April	(Sweden) Jiloan Hamad	Hammarby IF	
May	(The Gambia) Pa Dibba	Hammarby IF	
July	(Iran) Saman Ghoddos	Östersunds FK	
August	(Brazil) Paulinho	BK Häcken	
September	(Eritrea) Henok Goitom	AIK	
October	(Brazil) Paulinho	BK Häcken	

=== Annual awards ===
Award	Winner	Club
Player of the Year	(Brazil) Paulinho	BK Häcken
Goalkeeper of the Year	(Sweden) Isak Pettersson	IFK Norrköping
Defender of the Year	(Sweden) Per Karlsson	AIK
Midfielder of the Year	(Sweden) Kristoffer Olsson	AIK
Striker of the Year	(Brazil) Paulinho	BK Häcken
Breakthrough of the Year	(Sweden) Muamer Tanković	Hammarby IF
Coach of the Year	(Sweden) Rikard Norling	AIK

== See also ==
Competitions

- 2018 Superettan
- 2018 Division 1
- 2017–18 Svenska Cupen
- 2018–19 Svenska Cupen

Team seasons

- 2018 AIK Fotboll season
- 2018 Djurgårdens IF season
- 2018 Hammarby Fotboll season
- 2018 Malmö FF season

== Attendances ==
Hammarby IF drew the highest average home attendance in the 2018 edition of the Swedish top-flight football league.

#	Football club	Home games	Average attendance
1	Hammarby IF	15	23,680
2	AIK Fotboll	15	23,664
3	Malmö FF	15	14,921
4	Djurgårdens IF	15	12,307
5	IFK Göteborg	15	9,979
6	IFK Norrköping	15	9,139
7	IF Elfsborg	15	6,318
8	Östersunds FK	15	6,021
9	Kalmar FF	15	5,563
10	Örebro SK	15	5,497
11	GIF Sundsvall	15	4,067
12	IK Sirius	15	3,999
13	BK Häcken	15	3,462
14	Trelleborgs FF	15	2,503
15	IF Brommapojkarna	15	2,237
16	Dalkurd FF	15	1,062
