= Jesper Modig =

Swedish footballer (born 1994)

Personal information
- Full name: Ted Filip Jesper Modig
- Date of birth: 6 September 1994 (age 32)
- Height: 1.80 m (5 ft 11 in)
- Position: Defender

Team information
- Current team: Trelleborgs FF
- Number: 18

Youth career
- IFK Simrishamn

Senior career*
Years	Team	Apps	(Gls)
2011–2013	IF Limhamn Bunkeflo	42	(0)
2014	Valdres FK	22	(3)
2015	Lunds BK	20	(0)
2016–2018	Kristianstad FC	36	(2)
2018–2020	Varbergs BoIS	46	(1)
2021–2022	Trelleborgs FF	42	(1)
2023	AFC Eskilstuna	24	(2)
2024–2026	Örebro	41	(1)
2026–	Trelleborgs FF	30	(2)
- * Club domestic league appearances and goals as of 16 November 2026

Jesper Modig (born 6 September 1994) is a Swedish footballer who plays as a defender for Ettan Fotboll club Trelleborgs FF.

== Club career ==
On 25 December 2023, Modig joined Örebro.

On 12 February 2026, Modig re-joined Trelleborgs FF.
