= Pa Dibba =

Gambian footballer (born 1987)

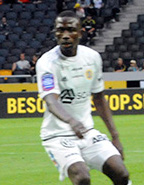

Personal information
- Full name: Pa Amat Dibba
- Date of birth: 15 October 1987 (age 39)
- Place of birth: Farafenni, Gambia
- Height: 1.78 m (5 ft 10 in)
- Position: Forward

Team information
- Current team: IFK Haninge
- Number: 11

Youth career
- Hammarby IF
- FOC Farsta
- Enskede IK

Senior career*
Years	Team	Apps	(Gls)
2005–2011	Brandbergens IF	94	(142)
2011–2016	GIF Sundsvall	132	(34)
2016–2018	Hammarby IF	47	(17)
2018–2019	Shenzhen FC	1	(0)
2019	→ Shanghai Shenxin (loan)	25	(4)
2020–2021	Adana Demirspor	47	(14)
2021–2023	Eyüpspor	61	(14)
2023–	IFK Haninge	58	(48)

International career
2015–2016	Gambia	5	(1)
- * Club domestic league appearances and goals as of 24 November 2025

Pa Amat Dibba (born 15 October 1987) is a Gambian professional footballer who plays as a forward for Swedish club IFK Haninge.

== Career ==
=== Early career ===
Dibba was born in Gambia but moved to Sweden with his family at age seven. The family settled in Brandbergen, near Stockholm. As a youth player he spent time with Hammarby IF, FOC Farsta and Enskede IK before eventually playing first team football with Brandbergens IF.

Brandbergens IF were playing in the ninth tier of Swedish football at the time but would make a quick rise to the fifth tier during Dibba's years with the club. At the start of 2011 Dibba trialed with Hammarby IF feeder club Hammarby Talang FF. They were interested in signing him but didn't have room in their squad at the time. Dibba instead remained at Brandbergen for the first half of the season and then trialed with Superettan side GIF Sundsvall during the summer, where he was eventually signed to a 3.5 year deal.

=== GIF Sundsvall ===
He soon established himself as a frequent starter in Sundsvall. Between 2011 and 2016 he would make 132 appearances for the yo-yo club in both Allsvenskan and Superettan, scoring 34 competitive goals. On the 19 November 2014 Pa signed a new contract with GIF Sundsvall lasting until 2016.

With only six months left of this contract, Dibba attracted the attention from fellow Allsvenskan team Hammarby IF during the 2016 midseason. He completed a transfer to the Stockholm-based club, where he previously had been on trial, on 8 August 2016.

=== Hammarby IF ===
He made his debut for Hammarby a week later in an away fixture against Sundsvall, the team he just had left. The appearance sparked some controversy as the Sundsvall staff claimed the two clubs had reached a spoken "gentlemen's agreement" that Dibba would not feature in this particular game. However, the deal was later denied by officials from Hammarby in a statement on their website. On 26 September 2016, Dibba scored his first goal in Allsvenskan for Hammarby against Falkenbergs FF on away turf in a 2–0 win.

On 17 April 2017, Dibba scored the decisive goal as Hammarby won against fierce rivals AIK. He settled the score at 2–1 in the later stages of the game, citing "it had been a dream to determine a derby".

Dibba had his major breakthrough in 2018, scoring 7 goals in 10 matches, as Hammarby was placed first in the league mid-season. He was voted "Allsvenskan Player of the Month" in May.

=== Shenzhen FC ===
On 28 June 2018, Dibba joined Chinese club Shenzhen FC. He signed a three-year contract with the China League One club, as reports suggested a transfer fee of around 12 million Swedish kronor (approximately £1 million).

=== Shanghai Shenxin ===
In February 2019, Dibba was loaned to China League One side Shanghai Shenxin for the 2019 season.

== Personal life ==
Dibba has a total of 14 siblings. Even though he has lived the majority of his life in Sweden, it was his dream to represent the Gambia national football team.

He is a supporter of Real Madrid and names the Brazilian striker Ronaldo as his football idol.

In August 2017, R&B artist Madi Banja released a single called "Pa Dibba". The duo are personal friends and share Gambian heritage.

== Career statistics ==
Club performance			League		Cup		Continental		Other		Total	
Club	Season	League	Apps	Goals	Apps	Goals	Apps	Goals	Apps	Goals	Apps	Goals
Sweden			League		Svenska Cupen		Europe		Other		Total	
Brandbergens IF	2010	Division 4	14	9	—		—		—		14	9
Brandbergens IF	2011	Division 3	14	11	—		—		—		14	11
GIF Sundsvall	2011	Superettan	10	0	—		—		—		10	0
GIF Sundsvall	2012	Allsvenskan	22	2	—		—		—		22	2
GIF Sundsvall	2013	Superettan	26	7	3	1	—		—		29	8
GIF Sundsvall	2014	Allsvenskan	27	12	4	2	—		—		31	14
GIF Sundsvall	2015	Allsvenskan	30	8			—		—		30	8
GIF Sundsvall	2016	Allsvenskan	17	5			—		—		17	5
Hammarby IF	2016	Allsvenskan	10	2	1	1	—		—		11	3
Hammarby IF	2017	Allsvenskan	27	8	3	2	—		—		30	10
Hammarby IF	2018	Allsvenskan	10	7	3	1	—		—		13	8
China			League		Chinese FA Cup		Asia		Other		Total	
Shenzhen FC	2018	China League One	1	0	0	0	—		—		1	0
Shanghai Shenxin (loan)	2019	China League One	25	4	1	1	—		—		26	5
Turkey			League		Turkish Cup		Europe		Other		Total	
Adana Demirspor	2019–20	TFF First League	15	5	0	0	—		3	1	18	6
Adana Demirspor	2020–21	TFF First League	31	9	3	0	—		—		34	9
Adana Demirspor	2021–22	Süper Lig	1	0	0	0	—		—		1	0
Eyüpspor	2021–22	TFF First League	30	10	0	0	—		—		30	10
Eyüpspor	2022-23	TFF First League	31	4	1	0	—		—		32	4
Haninge	2023	Division 2 Sodra	6	1							6	1
Haninge	2024	Division 2 Sodra	23	30	1	0					24	30
Haninge	2025	Ettan Norra Herr	29	17	2	1					31	18
Haninge	2026	Division 2 Sodra	14	20	2	2					16	22
Haninge	Total		72	68	5	3					77	71
Career total			413	171	24	11	—		3	1	440	183

=== International ===
Scores and results list the Gambia's goal tally first.

No	Date	Venue	Opponent	Score	Result	Competition
1.	13 October 2015	Sam Nujoma Stadium, Windhoek, Namibia	Namibia	1–0	1–2	2018 FIFA World Cup qualification
