= IK Frej =

Swedish association football club

- Full name: Idrottsklubben Frej
- Nickname: Kyrkråttorna
- Founded: 5 February 1968; 57 years ago
- Ground: Vikingavallen, Täby
- Capacity: 2,650
- Chairman: Joakim Landén
- Manager: Alni Sharifpour
- League: Division 3 Norra Svealand
| Home colours | Away colours |

IK Frej is a Swedish sports club located in Täby kyrkby. It currently plays in Division 3, the fifth tier in Swedish football.

== Background ==
IK Frej was founded 5 February 1968 by Åke Berghagen and his friends. Today, IK Frej has more than 1200 members, most of whom are active in the football section. Approximately 50% of the youngsters aged 7–17 years in Täby Kyrkby are members of the club.

The club is named after the Norse god Freyr, Frej in Swedish, and has a picture of a viking with a horned helmet in their crest.

Since 1968 IK Frej has participated mainly in the middle and lower divisions of the Swedish football league system. The club played in Superettan, the second tier of Swedish football, between 2015 and 2019. They play their home matches at the Vikingavallen in Täby.

In 2021, after several years of financial difficulties, IK Frej withdrew from Division 1 to join Division 4 instead. Affiliated club Hammarby IF in Allsvenskan, that had provided resources in forms of funds and loan players for several years, decided to form Hammarby Talangfotbollsförening that took the place of IK Frej in Division 1.

IK Frej are affiliated to the Stockholms Fotbollförbund.

== Coaching staff ==
=== First team ===
| Name | Role |
|---|---|
| (Sweden) Joakim Landén | Chairman |
| (Sweden) Alni Sharifpour | Head coach |
| (Sweden) Mahan Baghdadi | Assistant coach |

=== History ===
- (Sweden) Daniel Lundkvist (2021–2022)
- (Sweden) Alni Sharifpour (2022–)

== Season to season ==
| Season | Level | Division | Section | Position | Movements |
|---|---|---|---|---|---|
| 1995 | Tier 5 | Division 4 | Stockholm Norra | 6th | |
| 1996 | Tier 5 | Division 4 | Stockholm Norra | 3rd | |
| 1997 | Tier 5 | Division 4 | Stockholm Norra | 3rd | |
| 1998 | Tier 5 | Division 4 | Stockholm Norra | 8th | |
| 1999 | Tier 5 | Division 4 | Stockholm Norra | 9th | |
| 2000 | Tier 5 | Division 4 | Stockholm Norra | 6th | |
| 2001 | Tier 5 | Division 4 | Stockholm Norra | 1st | Promoted |
| 2002 | Tier 4 | Division 3 | Norra Svealand | 7th | |
| 2003 | Tier 4 | Division 3 | Norra Svealand | 9th | Relegation Playoffs |
| 2004 | Tier 4 | Division 3 | Norra Svealand | 1st | Promoted |
| 2005 | Tier 3 | Division 2 | Östra Svealand | 12th | Relegated |
| 2006* | Tier 5 | Division 3 | Norra Svealand | 1st | Promoted |
| 2007 | Tier 4 | Division 2 | Norra Svealand | 4th | |
| 2008 | Tier 4 | Division 2 | Norra Svealand | 7th | |
| 2009 | Tier 4 | Division 2 | Norra Svealand | 3rd | |
| 2010 | Tier 4 | Division 2 | Norra Svealand | 1st | Promoted |
| 2011 | Tier 3 | Division 1 | Norra | 8th | |
| 2012 | Tier 3 | Division 1 | Norra | 5th | |
| 2013 | Tier 3 | Division 1 | Norra | 8th | |
| 2014 | Tier 3 | Division 1 | Norra | 2nd | Promotion Playoffs – Promoted |
| 2015 | Tier 2 | Superettan | | 14th | Relegation Playoffs – Not relegated |
| 2016 | Tier 2 | Superettan | | 10th | |
| 2017 | Tier 2 | Superettan | | 14th | Relegation Playoffs – Not relegated |
| 2018 | Tier 2 | Superettan | | 9th | |
| 2019 | Tier 2 | Superettan | | 14th | Relegation Playoffs – Relegated |
| 2020 | Tier 3 | Division 1 | Norra | 9th | |
| 2021 | Tier 6 | Division 4 | Stockholm Norra | 2nd | |
| 2022 | Tier 6 | Division 4 | Stockholm Norra | 1st | Promoted |
| 2023 | Tier 5 | Division 3 | Norra Svealand | 8th | |
| 2024 | Tier 5 | Division 3 | Norra Svealand | 6th | |
| 2025 | Tier 5 | Division 3 | Norra Svealand | 5th | |

* League restructuring in 2006 resulted in a new division being created at Tier 3 and subsequent divisions dropping a level.

== Attendances ==
In recent seasons IK Frej have had the following average attendances:

| Season | Average attendance | Division / Section | Level |
|---|---|---|---|
| 2002 | 155 | Div 3 Norra Svealand | Tier 4 |
| 2003 | 224 | Div 3 Norra Svealand | Tier 4 |
| 2004 | 260 | Div 3 Norra Svealand | Tier 4 |
| 2005 | 258 | Div 2 Östra Svealand | Tier 3 |
| 2006 | 155 | Div 3 Norra Svealand | Tier 5 |
| 2007 | 167 | Div 2 Norra Svealand | Tier 4 |
| 2008 | 212 | Div 2 Norra Svealand | Tier 4 |
| 2009 | 248 | Div 2 Norra Svealand | Tier 4 |
| 2010 | 210 | Div 2 Norra Svealand | Tier 4 |
| 2011 | 409 | Div 1 Norra | Tier 3 |
| 2012 | 316 | Div 1 Norra | Tier 3 |
| 2013 | 312 | Div 1 Norra | Tier 3 |
| 2014 | 503 | Div 1 Norra | Tier 3 |
| 2015 | 1,049 | Superettan | Tier 2 |
| 2016 | 921 | Superettan | Tier 2 |
| 2017 | 907 | Superettan | Tier 2 |
| 2018 | 863 | Superettan | Tier 2 |
| 2019 | 756 | Superettan | Tier 2 |
| 2020 | 0 | Division 1 | Tier 3 |

Attendances are provided in the Publikliga sections of the Svenska Fotbollförbundet website.

== Achievements ==
=== League ===
- Division 1 Norra
  - Runners-up (1): 2014
