= Stefan Billborn =

Swedish football coach

Personal information
- Full name: Stefan Bo Anders Billborn
- Date of birth: 15 November 1972 (age 53)
- Place of birth: Stockholm, Sweden
- Height: 1.87 m (6 ft 2 in)

Managerial career
- Years: Team
- 2010–2013: IF Brommapojkarna (assistant)
- 2014: IF Brommapojkarna
- 2017: Hammarby IF (assistant)
- 2018–2021: Hammarby IF
- 2022–2024: Sarpsborg 08
- 2024–2026: IFK Göteborg

Stefan Bo Anders Billborn (born 15 November 1972) is a Swedish football manager. He was most recently head coach of Allsvenskan club IFK Göteborg.

== Coaching career ==
=== Early career ===
Billborn started his managerial career in 1989, at age 17, by coaching several youth teams at local club Rågsveds IF. He was the youth coach of Stefan Ishizaki, who later became a Sweden international.

=== Brommapojkarna ===
In 1997, Billborn moved to IF Brommapojkarna where he worked in different roles in the organisation. He was the academy coach for players John Guidetti, Albin Ekdal, Ludwig Augustinsson and Kristoffer Nordfeldt – who all four went on to play for the Sweden men's national team and in major European leagues in their professional careers.

Billborn was appointed assistant coach Brommapojkarna's senior team in 2010, first working with manager Kim Bergstrand and then Roberth Björknesjö.

Before the start of the 2014 season, Billborn was promoted to head coach at Brommapojkarna. The club finished 16th and last in the Allsvenskan table, only claiming 12 points in 30 games. Billborn was sacked in November and left the club.

=== Hammarby IF ===
In 2015, Billborn joined Hammarby IF as the new head of their academy. He was appointed assistant coach to manager Jakob Michelsen in Hammarby's senior team in 2017.

==== 2018 ====
On 10 January 2018, Billborn took over as manager of Hammarby IF in Allsvenskan, signing a three-year contract. He led the club to a surprising 4th position in the table during his debut season, after being placed first in the league mid-season.

==== 2019 ====
In 2019, Hammarby started the league play in a mediocre fashion, but made a strong finish to the season (with eight straight wins during between match day 22 and 30) and ultimately finished 3rd in Allsvenskan. This meant that the club qualified for the 2020–21 UEFA Europa League, their first continental competition in over ten years.

==== 2020 ====
On 5 January 2020, Billborn signed a new three-year contract with Hammarby, together with his assistant coach Joachim Björklund. In a season postponed due to the COVID-19 pandemic, the side disappointedly finished 8th in the table. The club won 3–0 against Puskás Akadémia in the first round of the 2020–21 UEFA Europa League, but was eliminated from the tournament in the second round against Lech Poznań through a 0–3 loss.

==== 2021 ====
On 30 May 2021, Billborn won the 2020–21 Svenska Cupen with Hammarby IF, through a 5–4 win on penalties (0–0 after full-time) against BK Häcken in the final. On 11 June 2021, Hammarby decided to terminate Billborn's contract, with the club placed 8th in the 2021 Allsvenskan table after eight rounds.

=== Sarpsborg 08 ===
On 7 January 2022, Billborn was appointed head coach of Norwegian Eliteserien club Sarpsborg 08. Two days later, Billborn appointed Joachim Björklund from Hammarby as his assistant coach.

== Managerial statistics ==
As of match played 26 July 2026

Managerial record by team and tenure
Team	From	To	Record					Ref.
Team	From	To	P	W	D	L	Win %	Ref.
IF Brommapojkarna	6 December 2013	3 November 2014	41	7	8	26	17.07	
Hammarby IF	10 January 2018	11 June 2021	116	64	26	26	55.17	
Sarpsborg 08	7 January 2022	23 June 2024	84	36	11	37	42.86	
IFK Göteborg	25 June 2024	27 July 2026	74	30	16	28	40.54	
Total			315	137	61	117	43.49	

== Honours ==
=== Manager ===
Hammarby IF

- Svenska Cupen: 2020–21
