= 2015 Hammarby Fotboll season =

Hammarby Fotboll
2015 season
- Chairman: Richard von Yxkull
- Head coach: Nanne Bergstrand
- Stadium: Tele2 Arena
- Allsvenskan: 11th
- 2014–15 Svenska Cupen: Quarter-finals
- Top goalscorer: Erik Israelsson (6)
- Highest home attendance: 30,627 vs. Malmö FF (25 October 2015, Allsvenskan)
- Lowest home attendance: 10,419 vs. Landskrona BoIS (1 March 2015, Svenska Cupen)
- Average home league attendance: 25,507 (in Allsvenskan); 24,564 (in all competitions)

The 2015 season was Hammarby Fotboll's 100th in existence, and their 46th season in Allsvenskan. It was Hammarby's first season in Allsvenskan after spending 5 seasons in the Superettan. They competed in Allsvenskan and the Svenska Cupen during the season. Nanne Bergstrand returned to the team as his second season being manager. Gameplay for Hammarby in Svenska Cupen began on February 21, 2015, and ended on March 15, 2015. Gameplay for Hammarby in Allsvenskan began on April 4, 2015, and ended on October 31, 2015.

== Players ==
=== Squad Info ===
As of 11 August 2015

Note: This list includes all the players who played for Hammarby during the season. Note: Flags indicate national team as defined under FIFA eligibility rules; some limited exceptions apply. Players may hold more than one non-FIFA nationality.

| No. | Pos. | Nation | Player |
|---|---|---|---|
| 1 | GK | ISL | Ögmundur Kristinsson |
| 2 | DF | ISL | Birkir Már Sævarsson |
| 3 | DF | SWE | Richard Magyar |
| 4 | MF | SWE | Erik Israelsson |
| 5 | DF | SWE | Philip Haglund |
| 6 | DF | GHA | Joseph Aidoo (on loan from Inter Allies) |
| 7 | MF | SWE | Jakob Orlov (on loan from Brann) |
| 8 | MF | SWE | Johan Persson (vice captain) |
| 9 | DF | SWE | Stefan Batan |
| 10 | MF | SWE | Kennedy Bakircioglu (captain) |
| 11 | FW | SWE | Pablo Piñones Arce |
| 14 | MF | NOR | Fredrik Torsteinbø |

| No. | Pos. | Nation | Player |
|---|---|---|---|
| 17 | FW | SWE | Linus Hallenius |
| 18 | MF | SWE | Oliver Silverholt |
| 19 | DF | SWE | Stefan Batan |
| 21 | MF | NOR | Jan Gunnar Solli |
| 22 | MF | NOR | Lars Fuhre |
| 23 | DF | NOR | Lars Sætra |
| 25 | GK | SWE | Tim Markström |
| 26 | MF | SWE | Dušan Jajić |
| 27 | FW | SWE | Isac Lidberg |
| 34 | FW | SWE | Måns Söderqvist |
| 55 | FW | SWE | Imad Khalili |
| 77 | DF | NOR | Mats Solheim |

=== Transfers ===
==== In ====
| Date | Player | Previous club | Cost |
|---|---|---|---|
| 11 November 2014 | (Sweden) Oliver Silverholt | Halmstad BK | Free |
| 2 December 2014 | (Sweden) Måns Söderqvist | Kalmar FF | Free |
| 2 December 2014 | (Iceland) Birkir Már Sævarsson | SK Brann | Undisclosed |
| 4 December 2014 | (Sweden) Philip Haglund | IFK Göteborg | Free |
| 10 March 2015 | (Sweden) William Eskelinen | Värmdö IF | Undisclosed |
| 13 March 2015 | (Sweden) Dušan Jajić | IFK Haninge | Free |
| 31 March 2015 | (Norway) Mats Solheim | Kalmar FF | Undisclosed |
| 2 June 2015 | (Iceland) Ögmundur Kristinsson | Randers FC | Free |
| 7 July 2015 | (Sweden) Imad Khalili | Baniyas Club | Free |
| 7 July 2015 | (Sweden) Richard Magyar | FC Aarau | Free |
| 5 August 2015 | (Sweden) Joseph Aidoo | Inter Allies | Loan |
| 11 August 2015 | (Sweden) Jakob Orlov | SK Brann | Loan |
| | | | Total |
| | | | Unknown |

==== Out ====
| Date | Player | New club | Cost |
|---|---|---|---|
| 5 November 2014 | (Sweden) Daniel Theorin | Unattached | Released |
| 5 November 2014 | (Sweden) Andreas Haddad | Unattached | Released |
| 5 November 2014 | (Sweden) Sebastian Ludzik | Nyköpings BIS | Free |
| 5 November 2014 | (Sweden) Nicklas Lindqvist | Nyköpings BIS | Free |
| 25 November 2014 | (Netherlands) Michael Timisela | Unattached | Released |
| 9 March 2015 | (Sweden) Jonathan Tamimi | Jönköping Södra IF | Undisclosed |
| 10 March 2015 | (Sweden) William Eskelinen | Värmdö IF | Loan |
| 19 March 2015 | (Sweden) Sinan Ayrancı | Unattached | Released |
| 7 May 2015 | (Denmark) Thomas Guldborg Christensen | Valur | Free |
| 27 May 2015 | (Sweden) Johannes Hopf | Gençlerbirliği S.K. | Undisclosed |
| 29 June 2015 | (Bosnia and Herzegovina) Marko Mihajlovic | Unattached | Released |
| 15 July 2015 | (Sweden) Nahir Besara | Göztepe S.K. | Undisclosed |
| 31 July 2015 | (Sweden) Viktor Nordin | IK Frej | Loan |
| 11 August 2015 | (Liberia) Amadaiya Rennie | SK Brann | Loan |
| | | | Total |
| | | | Unknown |

=== Player statistics ===
Includes all players who partook in the 2015 Hammarby Season. Appearances for competitive matches only

| No. | Pos | Nat | Player | Total | | Allsvenskan | | 2014–15 Svenska Cupen 2015–16 Svenska Cupen | |
| No. | Pos | Nat | Player | Apps | Goals | Apps | Goals | Apps | Goals |
|---|---|---|---|---|---|---|---|---|---|
| 1 | GK | (Sweden) SWE | Johannes Hopf | 15 | 0 | 10 | 0 | 5 | 0 |
| 1 | GK | (Iceland) ISL | Ögmundur Kristinsson | 15 | 0 | 15 | 0 | 0 | 0 |
| 2 | DF | (Iceland) ISL | Birkir Már Sævarsson | 32 | 2 | 28 | 2 | 4 | 0 |
| 3 | DF | (Denmark) DEN | Thomas Guldborg Christensen | 3 | 0 | 0 | 0 | 3 | 0 |
| 3 | DF | (Sweden) SWE | Richard Magyar | 11 | 0 | 11 | 0 | 0 | 0 |
| 4 | MF | (Sweden) SWE | Erik Israelsson | 25 | 6 | 22 | 6 | 3 | 0 |
| 5 | DF | (Sweden) SWE | Philip Haglund | 26 | 0 | 26 | 0 | 0 | 0 |
| 6 | DF | (Bosnia and Herzegovina) BIH | Marko Mihajlović | 1 | 0 | 0 | 0 | 1 | 0 |
| 6 | DF | (Ghana) GHA | Joseph Aidoo | 1 | 0 | 1 | 0 | 0 | 0 |
| 7 | MF | (Sweden) SWE | Nahir Besara | 19 | 5 | 15 | 5 | 4 | 0 |
| 7 | FW | (Sweden) SWE | Jakob Orlov | 11 | 2 | 11 | 2 | 0 | 0 |
| 8 | MF | (Sweden) SWE | Johan Persson | 29 | 3 | 25 | 2 | 4 | 1 |
| 9 | DF | (Sweden) SWE | Stefan Batan | 22 | 0 | 19 | 0 | 3 | 0 |
| 10 | MF | (Sweden) SWE | Kennedy Bakircioglu | 26 | 5 | 22 | 4 | 4 | 1 |
| 11 | FW | (Sweden) SWE | Pablo Piñones Arce | 14 | 0 | 11 | 0 | 3 | 0 |
| 14 | MF | (Norway) NOR | Fredrik Torsteinbø | 22 | 5 | 21 | 5 | 1 | 0 |
| 15 | MF | (Sweden) SWE | Viktor Nordin | 1 | 0 | 1 | 0 | 0 | 0 |
| 17 | FW | (Sweden) SWE | Linus Hallenius | 27 | 4 | 23 | 3 | 4 | 1 |
| 18 | MF | (Sweden) SWE | Oliver Silverholt | 16 | 0 | 15 | 0 | 1 | 0 |
| 20 | MF | (Liberia) LBR | Amadaiya Rennie | 12 | 1 | 9 | 0 | 3 | 1 |
| 21 | MF | (Norway) NOR | Jan Gunnar Solli | 19 | 1 | 16 | 1 | 3 | 0 |
| 22 | MF | (Norway) NOR | Lars Fuhre | 17 | 0 | 14 | 0 | 3 | 0 |
| 23 | DF | (Norway) NOR | Lars Sætra | 33 | 1 | 29 | 1 | 4 | 0 |
| 25 | GK | (Sweden) SWE | Tim Markström | 5 | 0 | 5 | 0 | 0 | 0 |
| 26 | MF | (Sweden) SWE | Dusan Jajic | 2 | 0 | 2 | 0 | 0 | 0 |
| 27 | FW | (Sweden) SWE | Isac Lidberg | 2 | 0 | 2 | 0 | 0 | 0 |
| 34 | FW | (Sweden) SWE | Måns Söderqvist | 30 | 2 | 26 | 2 | 4 | 0 |
| 55 | FW | (Sweden) SWE | Imad Khalili | 12 | 0 | 12 | 0 | 0 | 0 |
| 77 | DF | (Sweden) SWE | Mats Solheim | 26 | 2 | 26 | 2 | 0 | 0 |

=== Disciplinary record ===
| N | Pos. | Nat. | Name | Yellow card | Second yellow card | Red card | Notes |
|---|---|---|---|---|---|---|---|
| 2 | DF | (Sweden) | Sævarsson | 7 | 0 | 0 | |
| 3 | DF | (Sweden) | Magyar | 3 | 0 | 0 | |
| 4 | MF | (Sweden) | Israelsson | 3 | 0 | 0 | |
| 5 | MF | (Sweden) | Haglund | 1 | 0 | 0 | |
| 8 | MF | (Sweden) | Persson | 8 | 0 | 0 | |
| 9 | DF | (Sweden) | Batan | 4 | 0 | 0 | |
| 11 | FW | (Sweden) | Piñones-Arce | 1 | 0 | 1 | |
| 14 | MF | (Norway) | Torsteinbø | 1 | 0 | 0 | |
| 17 | FW | (Sweden) | Hallenius | 1 | 0 | 0 | |
| 18 | MF | (Sweden) | Silverholt | 2 | 0 | 0 | |
| 20 | MF | (Liberia) | Rennie | 1 | 0 | 0 | |
| 21 | MF | (Norway) | Solli | 2 | 0 | 0 | |
| 22 | MF | (Norway) | Lars Fuhre | 2 | 0 | 0 | |
| 23 | DF | (Norway) | Sætra | 3 | 0 | 0 | |
| 25 | GK | (Sweden) | Markström | 1 | 0 | 0 | |
| 26 | MF | (Sweden) | Jajic | 1 | 0 | 0 | |
| 34 | FW | (Sweden) | Söderqvist | 3 | 0 | 0 | |
| 55 | FW | (Sweden) | Khalili | 1 | 0 | 0 | |
| 77 | DF | (Norway) | Solheim | 5 | 0 | 0 | |

Last updated: 1 November 2015
Source: svenskfotboll.se
Only competitive matches
(yellow card) = Number of bookings; (second yellow card) = Number of sending offs after a second yellow card; (red card) = Number of sending offs by a direct red card.
Notes: Allsvenskan only

== Club ==
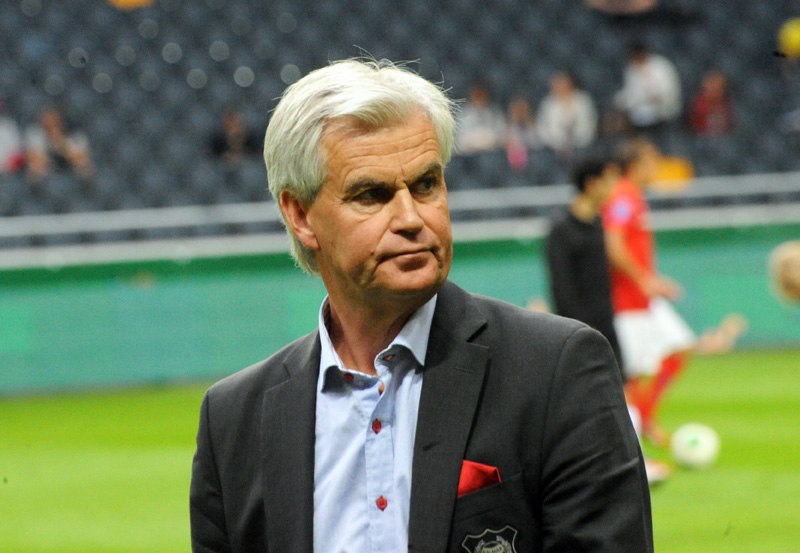
The 2015 season was Nanne Bergstrand's second season with Hammarby Fotboll.

=== Coaching staff ===
| Position | Staff |
|---|---|
| Manager | (Sweden) Nanne Bergstrand |
| Assistant manager | (Sweden) Carlos Banda |
| First team coach | (Sweden) Patrik Hansson |
| Goalkeeping coach | (Sweden) Mikael "Mille" Olsson |
| Fitness coach | (Sweden) Claes Hellgren |
| Mental coach | (Sweden) Anders Friberg |
| Physician | (Sweden) Mikael Klotz |

=== Other information ===
| Chairman | (Sweden) Richard von Yxkull |
| General Manager | (Sweden) Mats Jingblad |
| Ground (capacity and dimensions) | Tele2 Arena (33,000 / ) |

== Pre-season and friendlies ==
=== Friendlies ===
| 28 January 2015 Friendly | Assyriska FF | 1–8 | Hammarby IF | Södertälje, Sweden |
| 18:30 CET (UTC+01) | Aganovic 16' | Report | Fuhre 20'; Söderqvist 35'; Besara 51', 63'; Bakircioglü 52'; Nordin 65'; Piñones-Arce 68' (pen.); Sætra 70'; Mihajlovic (yellow card) 87' | Stadium: Södertälje Fotbollsarena; Attendance: 2,000; Referee: Jonas Eriksson (Sweden) |

| 3 February 2015 Friendly | Molde FK (Norway) | 2–2 | (Sweden) Hammarby IF | San Pedro del Pinatar, Spain |
| 18:00 CET (UTC+1) | Singh 30' (pen.); Svendsen 75' | Report | Persson (yellow card) 22'; Hallenius 30'; Söderqvist 49'; Israelsson (yellow card) 59' | Stadium: Pinatar Arena; Attendance: 150 |

| 6 February 2015 Friendly | Hammarby IF (Sweden) | 1–3 | (Norway) Strømsgodset IF | La Manga, Spain |
| 18:00 CET (UTC+1) | Bakircioglü 24'; Sætra (yellow card) 72'; Guldborg Christensen (yellow card) 91' | Report | Nguen 1'; Lehne Olsen 50'; Fossum 61' | Stadium: La Manga Stadium; Attendance: 130 |

| 9 February 2015 Friendly | FC Vestsjælland (Denmark) | 3–1 | (Sweden) Hammarby IF | La Manga, Spain |
| 18:00 CET (UTC+1) | Kure (red card) 8'; Vellios 16', 63'; Festersen 26' | Report | Piñones-Arce 77' | Stadium: La Manga Stadium; Attendance: 50 |

| 16 February 2015 Friendly | Hammarby IF (Sweden) | 2–1 | (United States) LA Galaxy | Stockholm, Sweden |
| 19:00 | Israelsson 12'; Hallenius 47' | report | Keane 8' (pen.); Juninho (red card) 55' | Stadium: Tele2 Arena; Attendance: 10,601; Referee: Stefan Johannesson (Sweden) |

| 28 March 2015 Friendly | Hammarby IF (Sweden) | 3–2 | (Norway) SK Brann | Stockholm, Sweden |
| 14:00 | Batan 28'; Bakircioglü 68' (pen.); Piñones-Arce 86' | report | Larsen 52'; Orlov 63' | Stadium: Tele2 Arena; Attendance: 3,987; Referee: Martin Strömbergsson |

== Competitions ==
=== Overall ===
| Competition | Started round | Current position / round | Final position / round | First match | Last match |
|---|---|---|---|---|---|
| Allsvenskan | N/A | — | 11th | 4 April 2015 | 31 October 2015 |
| 2014–15 Svenska Cupen | Round 2 | — | Quarter-finals | 20 August 2014 | 15 March 2015 |

Source: Competitions

=== Allsvenskan ===
==== League table ====
| Pos | Team | Pld | W | D | L | GF | GA | GD | Pts |
|---|---|---|---|---|---|---|---|---|---|
| 9 | Örebro SK | 30 | 9 | 10 | 11 | 36 | 50 | −14 | 37 |
| 10 | Gefle IF | 30 | 10 | 6 | 14 | 35 | 50 | −15 | 36 |
| 11 | Hammarby IF | 30 | 8 | 9 | 13 | 35 | 39 | −4 | 33 |
| 12 | GIF Sundsvall | 30 | 9 | 5 | 16 | 34 | 52 | −18 | 32 |
| 13 | Kalmar FF | 30 | 8 | 7 | 15 | 31 | 42 | −11 | 31 |

Source: svenskfotboll.se (in Swedish)
Rules for classification: 1) Points; 2) Goal difference; 3) Goals scored; 4) Head-to-head points; 5) Head-to-head goal difference; 6) Head-to-head away goals scored; 7) Play-off
(Note: Play-off is only played if need to decide champion, teams for relegation or UEFA competition and will be played on a neutral ground).

==== Results summary ====
| Overall | | | | | | | | Home | | | | | | Away | | | | | |
| Pld | W | D | L | GF | GA | GD | Pts | W | D | L | GF | GA | GD | W | D | L | GF | GA | GD |
|---|---|---|---|---|---|---|---|---|---|---|---|---|---|---|---|---|---|---|---|
| 30 | 8 | 9 | 13 | 35 | 39 | −4 | 33 | 6 | 3 | 6 | 18 | 15 | +3 | 2 | 6 | 7 | 17 | 24 | −7 |

Source: svenskfotboll.se (in Swedish)

==== Results by round ====
| Round | 1 | 2 | 3 | 4 | 5 | 6 | 7 | 8 | 9 | 10 | 11 | 12 | 13 | 14 | 15 | 16 | 17 | 18 | 19 | 20 | 21 | 22 | 23 | 24 | 25 | 26 | 27 | 28 | 29 | 30 |
|---|---|---|---|---|---|---|---|---|---|---|---|---|---|---|---|---|---|---|---|---|---|---|---|---|---|---|---|---|---|---|
| Ground | H | A | H | A | H | A | A | H | A | A | H | A | H | A | H | A | H | A | H | A | A | H | H | A | H | H | A | H | H | A |
| Result | W | D | W | L | W | D | L | L | L | L | D | D | L | D | W | D | L | L | D | W | D | D | L | L | W | W | W | L | L | L |
| Position | 2 | 5 | 3 | 7 | 5 | 6 | 8 | 9 | 10 | 11 | 11 | 11 | 11 | 11 | 10 | 11 | 11 | 11 | 12 | 12 | 10 | 11 | 11 | 11 | 10 | 10 | 9 | 9 | 10 | 11 |

Source: see below
A = Away; H = Home; W = Win; D = Draw; L = Loss

==== Matches ====
Kickoff times are in UTC+2 unless stated otherwise.

| 4 April 2015 Round 1 | Hammarby IF | 2–0 | BK Häcken | Stockholm |
| 14:00 | Bakircioglü 13' (pen.); Söderqvist 39' | Report | | Stadium: Tele2 Arena; Attendance: 30,278; Referee: Mohammed Al-Hakim (Köping) |

| 8 April 2015 Round 2 | IF Elfsborg | 1–1 | Hammarby IF | Borås |
| 19:00 | Hallenius 42' | Report | Hedlund 53' | Stadium: Borås Arena; Attendance: 11,264; Referee: Jonas Eriksson (Sigtuna) |

| 13 April 2015 Round 3 | Hammarby IF | 2–1 | Djurgårdens IF | Stockholm |
| 19:00 | Bakircioglü 55'; Besara 60' | Report | Johnson 26' | Stadium: Tele2 Arena; Attendance: 27,597; Referee: Michael Lerjéus (Skövde) |

| 20 April 2015 Round 4 | Malmö FF | 3–1 | Hammarby IF | Malmö |
| 19:00 | Rosenberg 12'; Lewicki 39'; Mehmeti 90+2' | Report | Bakircioglü 15' | Stadium: Swedbank Stadion; Attendance: 19,849; Referee: Martin Strömbergsson (Gävle) |

| 25 April 2015 Round 5 | Hammarby IF | 2–1 | Åtvidabergs FF | Stockholm |
| 16:00 | Hallenius 22'; Besara 25' | Report | Owoeri 52' | Stadium: Tele2 Arena; Attendance: 25,167; Referee: Stefan Johannesson (Täby) |

| 30 April 2015 Round 6 | Örebro SK | 2–2 | Hammarby IF | Örebro |
| 19:00 | Haginge 15'; Yasin 79' | Report | Solheim 43'; Sævarsson 64' | Stadium: Behrn Arena; Attendance: 10,486; Referee: Michael Lerjéus (Skövde) |

| 4 May 2015 Round 7 | AIK | 2–0 | Hammarby IF | Stockholm |
| 19:00 | Goitom 56'; Sonko Sundberg 75' | Report | | Stadium: Friends Arena; Attendance: 41,630; Referee: Mohammed Al-Hakim (Köping) |

| 11 May 2015 Round 8 | Hammarby IF | 1–2 | GIF Sundsvall | Stockholm |
| 19:00 | Persson 12' | Report | Lundström 39'; Sigurjónsson 90' | Stadium: Tele2 Arena; Attendance: 21,535; Referee: Kristoffer Karlsson |

| 20 May 2015 Round 9 | IFK Norrköping | 1–0 | Hammarby IF | Norrköping |
| 19:00 | Kujović 45+1' | Report | | Stadium: Nya Parken; Attendance: 13,814; Referee: Michael Lerjéus (Skövde) |

| 25 May 2015 Round 10 | Helsingborgs IF | 1–0 | Hammarby IF | Helsingborg |
| 19:00 | Landgren (yellow card) 26'; Simović 65' | Report | Solli (yellow card) 67'; Söderqvist (yellow card) 78' | Stadium: Olympia; Attendance: 8,689; Referee: Martin Strömbergsson (Gävle) |

| 30 May 2015 Round 11 | Hammarby IF | 2–2 | Halmstads BK | Stockholm |
| 16:00 | Israelsson 5'; Sævarsson (yellow card) 56'; Solli 63'; Persson (yellow card) 84' | Report | Westerberg (yellow card) 11'; Andersson 52' 59'; Keene (yellow card) 67'; Lukić (yellow card) 90' | Stadium: Tele2 Arena; Attendance: 21,688; Referee: Mohammed Al-Hakim (Köping) |

| 4 June 2015 Round 12 | Kalmar FF | 2–2 | Hammarby IF | Kalmar |
| 19:00 | Antonsson 29' 49' | Report | Söderqvist 52'; Hallenius 72' | Stadium: Guldfågeln Arena; Attendance: 10,436; Referee: Andreas Ekberg (Malmö) |

| 7 June 2015 Round 13 | Hammarby IF | 0–1 | IFK Göteborg | Stockholm |
| 15:00 | Mikkelsen 86' | Report | | Stadium: Tele2 Arena; Attendance: 27,556; Referee: Johan Hamlin (Enköping) |

| 5 July 2015 Round 14 | Gefle IF | 1–1 | Hammarby IF | Gävle |
| 19:05 | Fällman 8' | Report | Besara 13' | Stadium: Gavlevallen; Attendance: 6,430; Referee: Kristoffer Karlsson (Höganäs) |

| 12 July 2015 Round 15 | Hammarby IF | 3–0 | Falkenbergs FF | Stockholm |
| 19:00 | Besara 3', 75'; Israelsson 5' | Report | | Stadium: Tele2 Arena; Attendance: 21,337; Referee: Glenn Nyberg (Borlänge) |

| 5 July 2015 Round 16 | BK Häcken | 3–3 | Hammarby IF | Gothenburg |
| 19:05 | Abubakari 22'; De Oliveira 41', 46' | Report | Torsteinbø 28'; Persson 57'; Israelsson 63' | Stadium: Bravida Arena; Attendance: 6,123; Referee: Markus Strömbergsson (Gävle) |

| 26 July 2015 Round 17 | Hammarby IF | 0–1 | IFK Norrköping | Stockholm |
| 19:00 | | Report | Kujovic 37' | Stadium: Tele2 Arena; Attendance: 27,011; Referee: Glenn Nyberg (Borlänge) |

| 2 August 2015 Round 18 | GIF Sundsvall | 3–0 | Hammarby IF | Sundsvall |
| 19:05 | Sigurjónsson 61'; Dibba 65'; Sliper 90+4' | Report | | Stadium: Norrporten Arena; Attendance: 7,034; Referee: Michael Lerjéus (Skövde) |

| 9 August 2015 Round 19 | Hammarby IF | 0–0 | IF Elfsborg | Stockholm |
| 17:30 | | Report | | Stadium: Tele2 Arena; Attendance: 21,165; Referee: Andreas Ekberg (Lund) |

| 16 August 2015 Round 20 | Falkenbergs FF | 0–1 | Hammarby IF | Falkenberg |
| 19:00 | | Report | Torsteinbø 88' | Stadium: Falkenbergs IP; Attendance: 3,907; Referee: Kristoffer Karlsson (Höganäs) |

| 23 August 2015 Round 21 | Djurgårdens IF | 2–2 | Hammarby IF | Stockholm |
| 19:05 | Arvidsson 58'; Mushekwi 78' | Report | Torsteinbø 5'; Israelsson 69' | Stadium: Tele2 Arena; Attendance: 27,428; Referee: Martin Strömbergsson (Gävle) |

| 30 August 2015 Round 22 | Hammarby IF | 0–0 | Kalmar FF | Stockholm |
| 19:00 | | Report | | Stadium: Tele2 Arena; Attendance: 30,869; Referee: Glenn Nyberg (Borlänge) |

| 13 September 2015 Round 23 | Hammarby IF | 1–2 | Örebro SK | Stockholm |
| 15:00 | Orlov 16' | Report | Eriksson 23'; Ajdarević 35' | Stadium: Tele2 Arena; Attendance: 21,862; Referee: Andreas Ekberg (Lund) |

| 20 September 2015 Round 24 | IFK Göteborg | 1–0 | Hammarby IF | Gothenburg |
| 17:30 | Rieks 50' | Report | | Stadium: Gamla Ullevi; Attendance: 16,617; Referee: Mohammed Al-Hakim (Köping) |

| 23 September 2015 Round 25 | Hammarby IF | 3–0 | Gefle IF | Stockholm |
| 19:00 | Orlov 22'; Bakircioglü 51'; Israelsson 73' | Report | | Stadium: Tele2 Arena; Attendance: 18,173; Referee: Johan Hamlin (Bro) |

| 27 September 2015 Round 26 | Hammarby IF | 1–0 | AIK | Stockholm |
| 15:00 | Israelsson 88' | Report | | Stadium: Tele2 Arena; Attendance: 28,945; Referee: Jonas Eriksson (Sigtuna) |

| 4 October 2015 Round 27 | Åtvidabergs FF | 0–3 | Hammarby IF | Åtvidaberg |
| 19:00 | | Report | Solheim 56'; Torsteinbø 63', 72' | Stadium: Kopparvallen; Attendance: 5,566; Referee: Andreas Ekberg (Lund) |

| 18 October 2015 Round 28 | Hammarby IF | 1–4 | Helsingborgs IF | Stockholm |
| 17:30 | Sævarsson 41' | Report | Prica 8'; Wede 11'; Uronen 53'; Simovic 73' | Stadium: Tele2 Arena; Attendance: 28,797; Referee: Michael Lerjéus (Skövde) |

| 25 October 2015 Round 29 | Hammarby IF | 0–1 | Malmö FF | Stockholm |
| 15:00 | | Report | Bengtsson 58' | Stadium: Tele2 Arena; Attendance: 30,627; Referee: Bojan Pandžić (Gothenburg) |

| 31 October 2015 Round 30 | Halmstads BK | 2–1 | Hammarby IF | Halmstad |
| 13:00 | Henningsson 67'; Rusike 90+1' | Report | Sætra 54' | Stadium: Örjans Vall; Attendance: 2,878; Referee: Kristoffer Karlsson (Höganäs) |

=== Svenska Cupen ===
==== 2014–15 ====
The tournament continued from the 2014 season.

Kickoff times are in UTC+1.

===== Group stage =====
| Pos | Team | Pld | W | D | L | GF | GA | GD | Pts | Qualification | HAM | AIK | LAN | KFF |
|---|---|---|---|---|---|---|---|---|---|---|---|---|---|---|
| 1 | Hammarby IF | 3 | 2 | 1 | 0 | 4 | 2 | +2 | 7 | Advance to Knockout stage | — | — | 1–1 | — |
| 2 | AIK | 3 | 2 | 0 | 1 | 8 | 2 | +6 | 6 | | 1–2 | — | 4–0 | — |
| 3 | Landskrona BoIS | 3 | 1 | 1 | 1 | 3 | 6 | −3 | 4 | | — | — | — | 2–1 |
| 4 | Kristianstads FF | 3 | 0 | 0 | 3 | 1 | 6 | −5 | 0 | | 0–1 | 0–3 | — | — |

Source: svenskfotboll.se (in Swedish)
Rules for classification: 1) Points; 2) Goal difference; 3) Number of goals scored; 4) Head-to-head record; 5) Highest ranked team

| 21 February 2015 Matchday 1 | Kristianstads FF | 0–1 | Hammarby IF | Kristianstad |
| 14:00 | | Report | Hallenius 25'; Persson (yellow card) 87' | Stadium: Kristianstads IP; Attendance: 1,866; Referee: Kristoffer Karlsson (Höganäs) |

| 1 March 2015 Matchday 2 | Hammarby IF | 1–1 | Landskrona BoIS | Stockholm |
| 16:00 | Rennie 67' | Report | Jarl 3' | Stadium: Tele2 Arena; Attendance: 10,419; Referee: Mohammed Al-Hakim (Köping) |

| 7 March 2015 Matchday 3 | AIK | 1–2 | Hammarby IF | Solna |
| 13:00 | Goitom 8' | Report | Bakircioglü 16' (pen.); Persson 62' | Stadium: Friends Arena; Attendance: 41,063; Referee: Michael Lerjéus (Skövde) |

===== Knockout stage =====
| 15 March 2015 Quarter-finals | IF Elfsborg | 3–0 | Hammarby IF | Borås |
| 14:00 | Hedlund 4'; Svensson 63'; Frick 72' | Report | | Stadium: Borås Arena; Attendance: 4,035; Referee: Mohammed Al-Hakim (Köping) |

==== 2015–16 ====
The tournament continued into the 2016 season.
