= 2017 Hammarby Fotboll season =

Hammarby Fotboll
2017 season
- Chairman: Richard von Yxkull
- Head coach: Jakob Michelsen
- Stadium: Tele2 Arena
- Allsvenskan: 9th
- 2016–17 Svenska Cupen: Group stage
- Top goalscorer: League: Pa Dibba, Bjørn Paulsen (8); All: Pa Dibba (10)
- Highest home attendance: 30,671 (9 April vs Kalmar FF, Allsvenskan)
- Lowest home attendance: 6,786 (26 February vs Varbergs BoIS, Svenska Cupen)
- Average home league attendance: 22,137

The 2017 season was Hammarby Fotboll's 102nd in existence, their 48th season in Allsvenskan and their 3rd consecutive season in the league. They competed in Allsvenskan and Svenska Cupen during the year. League play started in early April and lasted until early November. Jakob Michelsen made his first season as manager.

== Summary ==
In the off-season, on 18 November 2016, the board chose to sack manager Nanne Bergstrand, citing "a need to get a new voice and new energy into the club's sporting development". Later the same month, Jakob Michelsen was announced as the successor. He joined the club on a three-year deal from the Danish club SønderjyskE.

The team had a disappointing run in the 2016-17 Svenska Cupen, getting knocked out in the group stage following a 0–1 away loss against Östersunds FK in a deciding fixture.

Hammarby had a promising first half of the 2017 Allsvenskan season, claiming the 6th place in the table after 12 games. During the spring, Hammarby also won both fixtures against fierce rivals AIK (2–1) and Djurgården (3–1).

In May 2017, Hammarby hired Jesper Jansson as the new director of football, ahead of a hectic summer transfer window. Hammarby sold 9 players, most notably defender Joseph Aidoo that moved to Genk in a reported club record transfer. At the same time, Hammarby brought in 8 new signings. Among these were Mads Fenger, Jeppe Andersen, Muamer Tanković, Johan Wiland and Sander Svendsen.

In the second half of the campaign, Hammarby struggled to produce any sort of challenge in the league, and subsequently dropped of in the table. Both manager Jacob Michelsen and several of the new signings suffered criticism from both supporters and pundits as the club eventually finished 9th in Allsvenskan.

== Players ==
=== Squad information ===
N	Pos.	Nat.	Name	Age	Since	App	Goals	Ends	Transfer fee	Notes
1	GK	(Sweden)	Johan Wiland	36	2017	14	0	2019	Undisclosed	
2	DF	(Iceland)	Birkir Már Sævarsson	33	2014	84	3	2017	Undisclosed	
4	DF	(Denmark)	Bjørn Paulsen	26	2017	29	8	2019	Undisclosed	
6	DF	(Sweden)	Oscar Krusnell	18	2017	4	0	2020 (June)	Undisclosed	
7	FW	(Sweden)	Imad Khalili	30	2015	34	1	2019	Free	On loan to Brommapojkarna
8	MF	(Denmark)	Jeppe Andersen	25	2017	15	0	2020 (June)	Free	
9	DF	(Sweden)	Stefan Batan	32	2014	58	0	2017	Undisclosed	
10	MF	(Sweden)	Kennedy Bakircioglu (captain)	37	2012	257	78	2018	Free	
11	MF	(Iceland)	Arnór Smárason (vice captain)	29	2015	56	9	2018	Undisclosed	
13	DF	(Denmark)	Mads Fenger	27	2017	10	0	2020 (June)	Free	
16	FW	(Brazil)	Rômulo	26	2016	43	9	2017	Undisclosed	
17	FW	(The Gambia)	Pa Dibba	30	2016	37	10	2019 (June)	Undisclosed	
18	MF	(Sweden)	Rebin Asaad	23	2017	10	0	2018	Free	
19	MF	(Gabon)	Serge-Junior Martinsson Ngouali	25	2017	21	1	2019	Undisclosed	
21	FW	(Norway)	Sander Svendsen	20	2017	10	6	2021 (June)	Undisclosed	
22	FW	(Sweden)	Muamer Tanković	22	2017	12	1	2020 (June)	Undisclosed	
23	DF	(Sweden)	Marcus Degerlund	19	2016	21	0	2021 (June)	Youth system	
26	MF	(Sweden)	Dušan Jajić	19	2015	8	0	2019	Undisclosed	On loan to IK Frej
27	GK	(Sweden)	Benny Lekström	36	2017	10	0	2017	Free	
28	MF	(Ghana)	Gershon Koffie	26	2017	1	0	2019	Free	On loan to New England Revolution
34	MF	(Sweden)	Leo Bengtsson	19	2016	18	0	2019 (June)	Youth system	
77	DF	(Norway)	Mats Solheim	30	2015	69	5	2019	Undisclosed	
90	MF	(Sweden)	Jiloan Hamad	27	2017	25	4	2019	Undisclosed	
–	DF	(Sweden)	Oliver Silverholt	23	2014	16	0	2017	Free	On loan to Varbergs BoIS

- Last updated: 6 November 2017
- Source: Hammarby Fotboll and players' Wikipedia articles
- Ordered by squad number.

=== Transfers ===
==== In ====
No.	Pos.	Nat.	Name	Age	Moving from	Type	Transfer window	Ends	Transfer fee	Source
–	MF	(Sweden)	Elias Durmaz	16	BK Forward	Transfer	Winter	–	Undisclosed	hammarbyfotboll.se
23	DF	(Sweden)	Marcus Degerlund	18	Youth system	Promoted	Winter	2018	–	hammarbyfotboll.se
28	MF	(Ghana)	Gershon Koffie	25	New England Revolution (United States)	Bosman	Winter	2019	Free	hammarbyfotboll.se
4	DF	(Denmark)	Bjørn Paulsen	25	Esbjerg fB (Denmark)	Transfer	Winter	2019	Undisclosed	hammarbyfotboll.se
90	MF	(Sweden)	Jiloan Hamad	26	1899 Hoffenheim (Germany)	Transfer	Winter	2019	Undisclosed	hammarbyfotboll.se
19	MF	(Gabon)	Serge-Junior Martinsson Ngouali	25	IF Brommapojkarna	Transfer	Winter	2019	Undisclosed	hammarbyfotboll.se
33	DF	(Croatia)	Mario Musa	26	Dinamo Zagreb (Croatia)	Loan	Winter	2017 (June)	–	hammarbyfotboll.se
13	DF	(Denmark)	Mads Fenger	26	Randers FC (Denmark)	Bosman	Summer	2020 (June)	Free	hammarbyfotboll.se
8	MF	(Denmark)	Jeppe Andersen	24	Esbjerg fB (Denmark)	Bosman	Summer	2020 (June)	Free	hammarbyfotboll.se
27	GK	(Sweden)	Benny Lekström	36	IK Sirius	Bosman	Summer	2017	Free	hammarbyfotboll.se
18	MF	(Sweden)	Rebin Asaad	22	Halmstads BK	Bosman	Summer	2018	Free	hammarbyfotboll.se
25	GK	(Sweden)	Johan Wiland	36	Malmö FF	Transfer	Summer	2019	Undisclosed	hammarbyfotboll.se
6	DF	(Sweden)	Oscar Krusnell	18	Sunderland (England)	Transfer	Summer	2020 (June)	Undisclosed	hammarbyfotboll.se
22	FW	(Sweden)	Muamer Tanković	22	AZ (Netherlands)	Transfer	Summer	2020 (June)	Undisclosed	hammarbyfotboll.se
21	FW	(Norway)	Sander Svendsen	20	Molde (Norway)	Transfer	Summer	2021 (June)	Undisclosed	hammarbyfotboll.se

==== Out ====
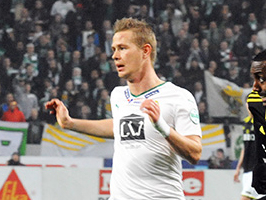
Erik Israelsson left Hammarby during the off season. He was the club's top scorer of the 2016 season.

No.	Pos.	Nat.	Name	Age	Moving to	Type	Transfer window	Transfer fee	Source
5	MF	(Sweden)	Philip Haglund	29	IK Sirius	End of contract	Winter	Free	hammarbyfotboll.se siriusfotboll.se
7	FW	(Brazil)	Alex	26	Free agent	End of contract	Winter	Free	hammarbyfotboll.se
22	DF	(Costa Rica)	Ian Smith	18	Santos de Guápiles (Costa Rica)	End of loan	Winter	End of loan	hammarbyfotboll.se
66	DF	(Sweden)	David Boo Wiklander	32	IFK Göteborg	End of contract	Winter	Free	hammarbyfotboll.se ifkgoteborg.se
	MF	(Sweden)	Petter Andersson	31	Retirement	Transfer	Winter		hammarbyfotboll.se
23	DF	(Norway)	Lars Sætra	25	Baoding Yingli ETS (China)	Transfer	Winter	Undisclosed	hammarbyfotboll.se
24	GK	(Sweden)	William Eskelinen	20	GIF Sundsvall	End of contract	Winter	Free	gifsundsvall.se
4	MF	(Sweden)	Erik Israelsson	27	PEC Zwolle (Netherlands)	Transfer	Winter	Undisclosed	hammarbyfotboll.se
18	DF	(Sweden)	Oliver Silverholt	22	Varbergs BoIS	Loan	Winter	–	hammarbyfotboll.se
27	FW	(Sweden)	Isac Lidberg	18	Åtvidabergs FF	Transfer	Winter	Undisclosed	hammarbyfotboll.se
28	MF	(Ghana)	Gershon Koffie	25	New England Revolution (United States)	Loan	Summer	–	hammarbyfotboll.se
33	DF	(Croatia)	Mario Musa	26	Dinamo Zagreb (Croatia)	End of loan	Summer	–	hammarbyfotboll.se
3	DF	(Sweden)	Richard Magyar	26	SpVgg Greuther Fürth (Germany)	End of contract	Summer	–	hammarbyfotboll.se
8	MF	(Sweden)	Johan Persson	33	Helsingborgs IF	End of contract	Summer	–	hammarbyfotboll.se
25	GK	(Sweden)	Tim Markström	30	Free agent	End of contract	Summer	–	hammarbyfotboll.se
14	MF	(Norway)	Fredrik Torsteinbø	26	Viking (Norway)	Transfer	Summer	Undisclosed	hammarbyfotboll.se
26	MF	(Sweden)	Dušan Jajić	19	IK Frej	Loan	Summer	–	hammarbyfotboll.se
6	DF	(Ghana)	Joseph Aidoo	21	Genk (Belgium)	Transfer	Summer	Undisclosed	hammarbyfotboll.se
7	FW	(Sweden)	Imad Khalili	30	IF Brommapojkarna	Loan	Summer	–	hammarbyfotboll.se
1	GK	(Iceland)	Ögmundur Kristinsson	28	Excelsior (Netherlands)	Transfer	Summer	Undisclosed	hammarbyfotboll.se

== Player statistics ==
=== Appearances and goals ===
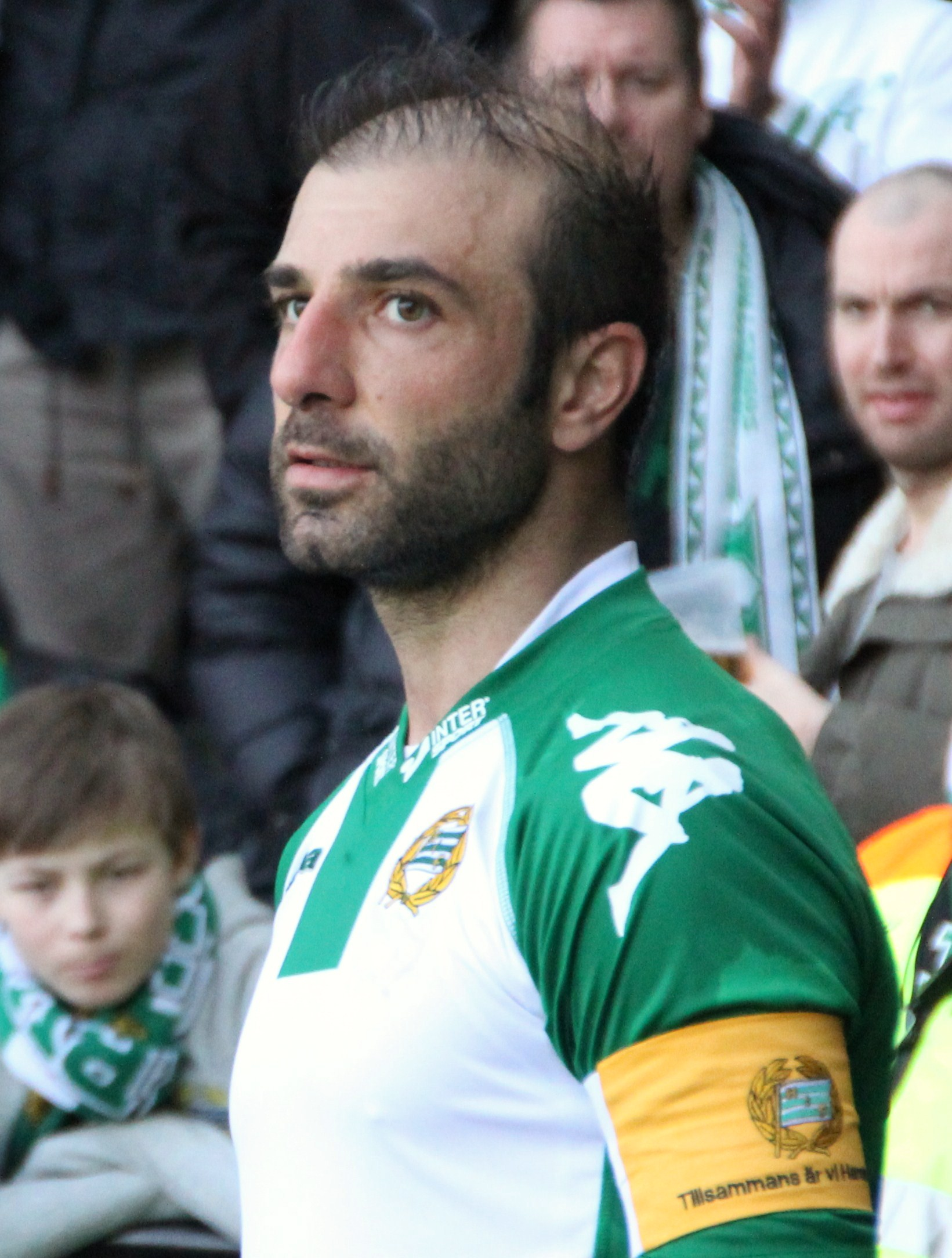
Kennedy Bakircioglu is the captain of Hammarby.

As of 6 November 2017

Number	Position	Name	2017 Allsvenskan		2016–17 Svenska Cupen 2017–18 Svenska Cupen		Total	
Number	Position	Name	Appearances	Goals	Appearances	Goals	Appearances	Goals
1	GK	Johan Wiland	14	0	1	0	15	0
2	DF	Birkir Már Sævarsson	29	0	4	1	33	1
4	MF	Bjørn Paulsen	29	8	4	0	33	8
6	DF	Oscar Krusnell	4	0	0	0	4	0
8	MF	Jeppe Andersen	15	0	1	0	16	0
9	DF	Stefan Batan	3	0	3	0	6	0
10	MF	Kennedy Bakircioglu	21	1	3	1	24	2
11	MF	Arnór Smárason	29	5	4	0	33	5
13	DF	Mads Fenger	10	0	1	0	11	0
16	FW	Rômulo	17	4	1	0	18	4
17	FW	Pa Dibba	27	8	3	2	30	10
18	MF	Rebin Asaad	10	0	1	0	11	0
19	MF	Serge-Junior Martinsson Ngouali	21	1	0	0	21	1
21	FW	Sander Svendsen	10	6	1	1	11	7
22	FW	Muamer Tanković	12	1	1	1	13	2
23	DF	Marcus Degerlund	21	0	1	0	22	0
27	GK	Benny Lekström	0	0	0	0	0	0
34	MF	Leo Bengtsson	18	0	3	1	21	1
77	DF	Mats Solheim	27	1	3	0	30	1
90	MF	Jiloan Hamad	25	4	4	2	29	6
Players that left the club during the season
1	GK	Ögmundur Kristinsson	16	0	3	0	19	0
3	DF	Richard Magyar	10	0	2	0	12	0
6	DF	Joseph Aidoo	12	0	3	0	15	0
7	FW	Imad Khalili	5	0	0	0	5	0
8	MF	Johan Persson	6	0	1	0	7	0
14	MF	Fredrik Torsteinbø	10	2	2	0	12	2
18	DF	Oliver Silverholt	0	0	0	0	0	0
25	GK	Tim Markström	0	0	0	0	0	0
26	MF	Dušan Jajić	3	0	3	0	6	0
27	FW	Isac Lidberg	0	0	0	0	0	0
28	MF	Gershon Koffie	1	0	2	0	3	0
33	DF	Mario Musa	2	0	0	0	2	0

=== Disciplinary record ===
N	P	Nat.	Name	Allsvenskan			Svenska Cupen			Total			Notes
N	P	Nat.	Name	Yellow card	Second yellow card	Red card	Yellow card	Second yellow card	Red card	Yellow card	Second yellow card	Red card	Notes
1	GK	(Iceland)	Ögmundur Kristinsson	1						1			
2	DF	(Iceland)	Birkir Már Sævarsson	4						4			
3	DF	(Sweden)	Richard Magyar	1	1		1			2	1		
4	MF	(Denmark)	Bjørn Paulsen	5						5			
6	DF	(Ghana)	Joseph Aidoo	4			1			5			
6	DF	(Sweden)	Oscar Krusnell	1						1			
8	MF	(Sweden)	Johan Persson										
8	MF	(Denmark)	Jeppe Andersen	4						4			
9	DF	(Sweden)	Stefan Batan										
10	MF	(Sweden)	Kennedy Bakircioglu	1			1			2			
11	MF	(Iceland)	Arnór Smárason	6			1			7			
13	DF	(Denmark)	Mads Fenger				1			1			
14	MF	(Norway)	Fredrik Torsteinbø	2						2			
16	FW	(Brazil)	Rômulo	1			1			2			
17	FW	(The Gambia)	Pa Dibba	3		1				3		1	
18	MF	(Sweden)	Rebin Asaad										
19	MF	(Gabon)	Serge-Junior Martinsson Ngouali	1		1				1		1	
21	FW	(Norway)	Sander Svendsen										
22	FW	(Sweden)	Muamer Tanković	1						1			
23	DF	(Sweden)	Marcus Degerlund	2			1			3			
25	GK	(Sweden)	Johan Wiland										
25	GK	(Sweden)	Tim Markström										
26	MF	(Sweden)	Dušan Jajić										
27	GK	(Sweden)	Benny Lekström										
28	MF	(Ghana)	Gershon Koffie										
33	DF	(Croatia)	Mario Musa	1						1			
34	MF	(Sweden)	Leo Bengtsson	2			1			3			
55	FW	(Sweden)	Imad Khalili										
77	DF	(Norway)	Mats Solheim					1			1		
90	MF	(Sweden)	Jiloan Hamad	3			3			6			

Last updated: 6 November 2017
Source: hammarbyfotboll.se
Only competitive matches
(yellow card) = Number of bookings; (second yellow card) = Number of sending offs after a second yellow card; (red card) = Number of sending offs by a direct red card.

== Club ==
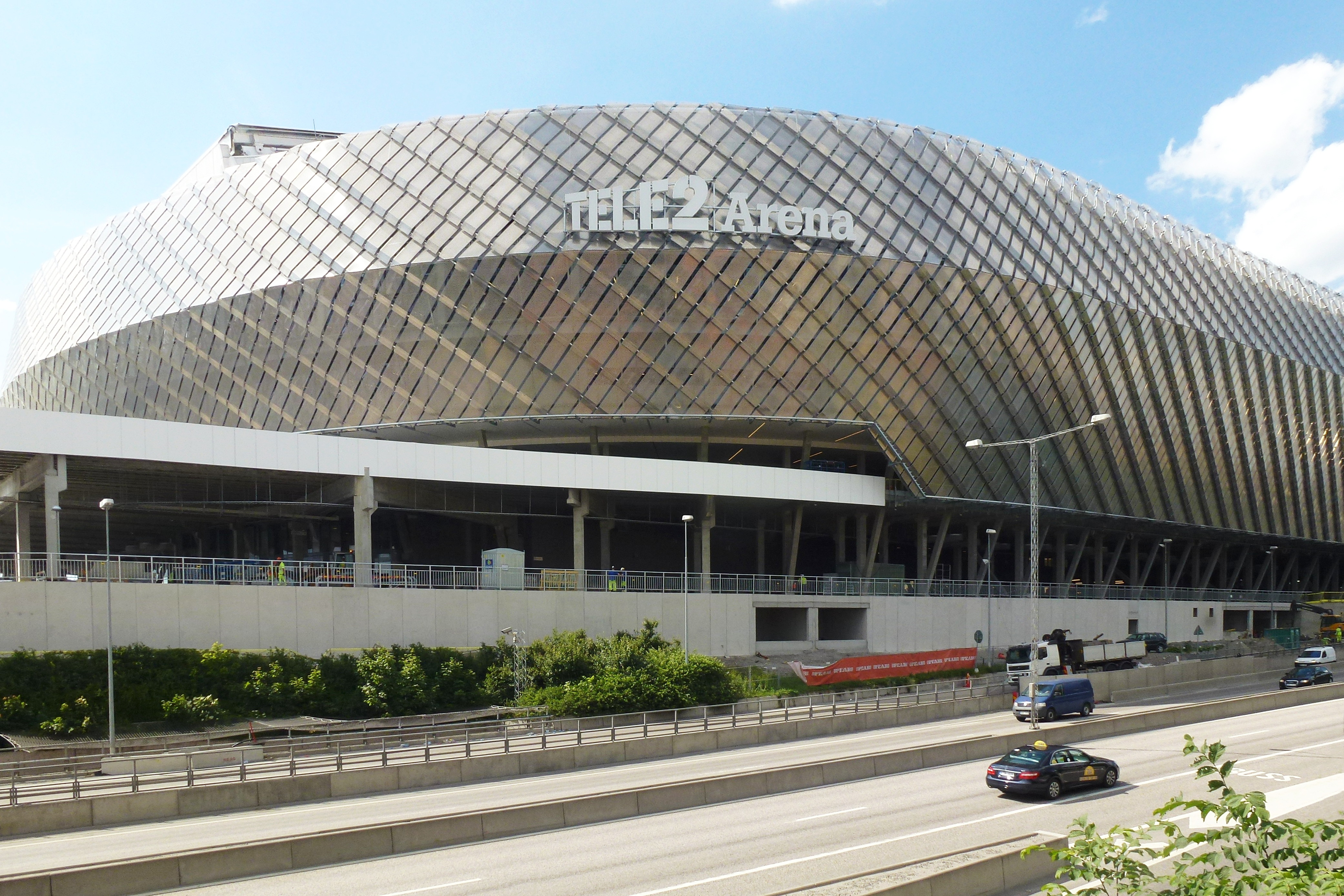
Tele2 Arena is the second largest stadium in Allsvenskan.

=== Coaching staff ===
Position	Staff
Manager	(Denmark) Jakob Michelsen
Assistant manager	(Sweden) Pablo Piñones Arce
Head coach youth academy and assistant manager	(Sweden) Stefan Billborn
Goalkeeping coach	(Sweden) Mikael "Mille" Olsson
Fitness coach	(Sweden) Jimmy Lidberg
Club doctor	(Sweden) Mikael Klotz
Physiotherapist	(Sweden) Linda Eisersjö
Physiotherapist	(Sweden) Andreas Gavelius
Equipment manager	(Sweden) Anders Bitén
U19 head coach	(Sweden) Klebér Saarenpää
U19 assistant coach	(Sweden) Antonio Andric
U17 head coach	(Sweden) Fredrik Samuelsson
U17 assistant coach	(Sweden) Thomas Lyth
U19 and U17 goalkeeping coach	(Sweden) Gustav Scheutz
U19 and U17 fitness coach	(Sweden) Nebez Kurban

=== Other information ===
Chairman	(Sweden) Richard von Yxkull
Chief Executive Officer	(Sweden) Henrik Kindlund
Director of football	(Sweden) Jesper Jansson
Technical director	(Sweden) Ola Larsson
Head of scouting	(Sweden) Mikael Hjelmberg
Ground (capacity and dimensions)	Tele2 Arena (33,000 / )

== Pre-season and friendlies ==
=== Friendlies ===
24 January 2017 Friendly	UD Las Palmas (Spain)	2-0	(Sweden) Hammarby IF	Maspalomas, Spain
12:00 CET (UTC+01)	El Zhar 42'; Paulsen 57' (o.g.)	Report		Stadium: Estadio de Maspalomas

29 January 2017 Friendly	Brommapojkarna	1-3	Hammarby IF	Stockholm, Sweden
14:00 CET (UTC+01)	Gustafsson 63'	Report	Dibba 29'; Smárason (yellow card) 37'; Aidoo 42'; Smárason 64'	Stadium: Grimsta IP; Referee: Jim Petersson (Sweden)

7 February 2017 Friendly	Hammarby IF (Sweden)	2-3	(Finland) HJK Helsinki	Stockholm, Sweden
19:00 CET (UTC+01)	Bengtsson 15'; Aidoo 32'	Report	Pelvas 62'; Yaghoubi (yellow card) 70'; Morales 72'; Jallow 79'; Rafinha (yellow card) 88'	Stadium: Tele2 Arena; Attendance: 4178; Referee: Glenn Nyberg (Sweden)

11 February 2017 Friendly	Hammarby IF	0-2	IFK Norrköping	Stockholm, Sweden
12:00 CET (UTC+1)	Soheim (yellow card) 55'	Report	Holmberg 22'; Langer (yellow card) 42'; Wahlqvist 61' (pen.); Skrabb (yellow card) 72'; Johansson (yellow card) 84'	Stadium: Tele2 Arena; Attendance: 5000; Referee: Johan Hamlin (Sweden)

12 February 2017 Friendly	Assyriska FF	2-2	Hammarby IF	Södertälje, Sweden
15:00 CET (UTC+1)	Strand 62'; Degerlund 92' (o.g.)	Report	Rômulo (yellow card) 77'; Rômulo 88'; Dibba 89'	Stadium: Södertälje Fotbollsarena

27 February 2017 Friendly	Hammarby IF	2-2	Enskede IK	Stockholm, Sweden
18:00 CET (UTC+1)	Lidberg 8'; 60' (o.g.)	Report	Ostojic 49'; Avernäs 66'	Stadium: Årsta IP; Attendance: 0 Referee: Jesper Ekwall (Sweden)

6 March 2017 Friendly	Hammarby IF	1-1	Västerås SK	Stockholm, Sweden
18:00 CET (UTC+1)	Lidberg 23'; Magyar (yellow card) 37'	Report	Safari 37'	Stadium: Årsta IP; Attendance: 0 Referee: Victor Wolf (Sweden)

11 March 2017 Friendly	AFC Eskilstuna	0-2	Hammarby IF	Eskilstuna, Sweden
16:00 CET (UTC+1)	Raskaj (yellow card) 38'; Michel (yellow card) 40'; Albornoz (yellow card) 71'	Report	Koffie (yellow card) 43'; Bakircioglu 52'; Paulsen 68'; Solheim (yellow card) 78'	Stadium: Tunavallen; Attendance: 2058; Referee: Farouk Nehdi (Sweden)

16 March 2017 Friendly	Örebro SK	3-2	Hammarby IF	Örebro, Sweden
18:00 CET (UTC+1)	Besara 13'; Rogic 18'; Hines-Ike 36'	Report	Torsteinbø 1'; Smárason (yellow card) 35'; Degerlund 50'	Stadium: Behrn Arena; Attendance: 819; Referee: Glenn Nyberg (Sweden)

24 March 2017 Friendly	Hammarby IF (Sweden)	4-0	(Finland) FC Ilves	Tyresö, Sweden
15:00 CET (UTC+1)	Dibba 10'; Dibba (yellow card) 18'; Smárason (yellow card) 26'; Paulsen 56'; Bakircioglu 60' (pen.); Hamad 70'	Report	Matrone (red card) 48'	Stadium: Tyresövallen; Referee: Johan Hamlin (Sweden)

21 June 2017 Friendly	Hammarby IF	1-3	GIF Sundsvall	Stockholm, Sweden
15:00 CET (UTC+1)	Edlund 79'	Report	Krogh Gerson 16'; Sigurðsson 38'; Suljević 58'	Stadium: Grimsta IP; Referee: Johan Hamlin (Sweden)

26 June 2017 Friendly	Hammarby IF	0-3	Östersunds FK	Norrtälje, Sweden
15:00 CET (UTC+1)		Report	Fritzon 54'; Ghoddos 64'; Gero 66'	Stadium: Norrtälje IP; Attendance: 686

19 October 2017 Friendly	Västerås SK	1-4	Hammarby IF	Västerås, Sweden
19:00 CET (UTC+1)	Svensson 65'	Report	Tanković 15' (pen.); Dibba 45'; Svendsen 62'; Sævarsson 75'	Stadium: Solid Park Arena; Referee: Enzo Vesprini (Sweden)

== Competitions ==
=== Overall ===
Competition	Started round	Current position / round	Final position / round	First match	Last match
Allsvenskan	—	—	9	2 April 2017	5 November 2017
2016–17 Svenska Cupen	Round 2	—	Group stage	24 August 2016	5 March 2017

Updated to match played 9 April 2017
Source: Competitions

=== Allsvenskan ===
==== League table ====
Pos	Team	Pld	W	D	L	GF	GA	GD	Pts
7	IK Sirius	30	11	7	12	46	51	−5	40
8	IF Elfsborg	30	10	9	11	53	59	−6	39
9	Hammarby IF	30	9	11	10	42	43	−1	38
10	IFK Göteborg	30	9	10	11	42	40	+2	37
11	Örebro SK	30	10	6	14	38	54	−16	36

Source: svenskfotboll.se (in Swedish)
Rules for classification: 1) Points; 2) Goal difference; 3) Goals scored; 4) Head-to-head points; 5) Head-to-head goal difference; 6) Head-to-head away goals scored; 7) Play-off
(Note: Play-off is only played if need to decide champion, teams for relegation or UEFA competition and will be played on a neutral ground).

==== Results summary ====
Overall								Home						Away					
Pld	W	D	L	GF	GA	GD	Pts	W	D	L	GF	GA	GD	W	D	L	GF	GA	GD
30	9	11	10	42	43	−1	38	5	8	3	27	22	+5	4	3	7	15	21	−6

Source: svenskfotboll.se (in Swedish)

==== Results by round ====
Round	1	2	3	4	5	6	7	8	9	10	11	12	13	14	15	16	17	18	19	20	21	22	23	24	25	26	27	28	29	30
Ground	A	H	A	H	A	H	A	A	H	A	H	H	A	H	A	H	A	H	H	A	A	H	A	H	A	H	A	H	A	H
Result	L	D	W	D	D	W	L	W	D	D	D	W	L	W	L	W	L	L	D	W	D	D	L	W	D	L	L	D	W	L
Position	11	13	8	8	11	4	10	7	7	8	8	7	9	7	9	9	9	9	11	9	10	9	10	7	7	9	11	11	7	9

Source: see below
A = Away; H = Home; W = Win; D = Draw; L = Loss

==== Matches ====
Kickoff times are in (UTC+01) unless stated otherwise.

2 April 2017 Round 1	IFK Norrköping	2-1	Hammarby IF	Norrköping
17:30	Andersson 24'; Dagerstål 41'	Report	Aidoo (yellow card) 10'; Kristinsson (yellow card) 57'; Martinsson Ngouali (red card) 77'; Rômulo 91'	Stadium: Östgötaporten; Attendance: 14533; Referee: Kristoffer Karlsson (Sweden)

9 April 2017 Round 2	Hammarby IF	1-1	Kalmar FF	Stockholm
15:00	Musa (yellow card) 62'; Paulsen (yellow card) 85'; Paulsen 94'; Aidoo (yellow card) 94'	Report	Diouf 14'; Larsson (yellow card) 54'; Hallberg (yellow card) 69'; Nouri (yellow card) 78'	Stadium: Tele2 Arena; Attendance: 30671; Referee: Kaspar Sjöberg (Sweden)

17 April 2017 Round 3	AIK	1-2	Hammarby IF	Solna
15:00	Johansson 14'; Krpić (yellow card) 16'; Olsson (yellow card) 28'	Report	Smárason 18'; Sævarsson (yellow card) 38'; Aidoo (yellow card) 40'; Dibba 79'; Hamad (yellow card) 89'	Stadium: Friends Arena; Attendance: 32318; Referee: Jonas Eriksson (Sweden)

23 April 2017 Round 4	Hammarby IF	0-0	GIF Sundsvall	Stockholm
15:00	Smárason (yellow card) 66'; Torsteinbø (yellow card) 88'	Report	Sonko Sundberg (yellow card) 83'	Stadium: Tele2 Arena; Attendance: 20557; Referee: Magnus Lindgren (Sweden)

26 April 2017 Round 5	IFK Göteborg	1-1	Hammarby IF	Gothenburg
19:00	Boman 91'	Report	Rogne 42' (o.g.); Aidoo (yellow card) 56'	Stadium: Gamla Ullevi; Attendance: 12149; Referee: Stefan Johannesson (Sweden)

29 April 2017 Round 6	Hammarby IF	4-0	AFC Eskilstuna	Stockholm
16:00	Paulsen 46'; Dibba 66'; Paulsen 78'; Smárason 91'	Report	Alexandersson (yellow card) 38'; Raskaj (yellow card) 60'; Raskaj (yellow card) 68' (red card)	Stadium: Tele2 Arena; Attendance: 20741; Referee: Kaspar Sjöberg (Sweden)

7 May 2017 Round 7	Östersunds FK	2-1	Hammarby IF	Östersund
15:00	Gero 72'; Gero (yellow card) 86'; Raskaj (yellow card) 87' (red card); Hopcutt 94'	Report	Smárason (yellow card) 37'; Martinsson Ngouali 62'; Sævarsson (yellow card) 74'	Stadium: Jämtkraft Arena; Attendance: 6027; Referee: Bojan Pandžić (Sweden)

14 May 2017 Round 8	Halmstad BK	1-2	Hammarby IF	Halmstad
15:00	Kinoshita 86'	Report	Hamad 7'; Hamad 11'; Sævarsson (yellow card) 79'; Torsteinbø (yellow card) 90'	Stadium: Örjans Vall; Attendance: 5201; Referee: Patrik Eriksson (Sweden)

17 May 2017 Round 9	Hammarby IF	1-1	Malmö FF	Stockholm
19:00	Magyar (yellow card) 17'; Rômulo (yellow card) 44'; Smárason 51'	Report	Lewicki (yellow card) 19'; Tinnerholm (yellow card) 43'; Berget (yellow card) 44'; Tinnerholm 68'	Stadium: Tele2 Arena; Attendance: 22456; Referee: Johan Hamlin (Sweden)

21 May 2017 Round 10	IK Sirius	1-1	Hammarby IF	Uppsala
15:00	Busch Thor 12'; Larson (yellow card) 65'; Ogbu (yellow card) 91'	Report	Torsteinbø 45'; Paulsen (yellow card) 62'; Bengtsson (yellow card) 91'	Stadium: Studenternas IP; Attendance: 7124; Referee: Magnus Lindgren (Sweden)

28 May 2017 Round 11	Hammarby IF	2-2	Jönköpings Södra	Stockholm
15:00	Dibba 18'; Magyar (yellow card) 22'; Magyar (yellow card) 26' (red card); Smárason (yellow card) 87'; Solheim 91'	Report	Kozica 74'; Ayuk 77'; Smylie (yellow card) 84'	Stadium: Tele2 Arena; Attendance: 20386; Referee: Kristoffer Karlsson (Sweden)

4 June 2017 Round 12	Hammarby IF	3-1	Djurgårdens IF	Stockholm
15:00	Rômulo 58'; Bengtsson (yellow card) 71'; Rômulo 83'; Dibba 93'	Report	Engvall 32'	Stadium: Tele2 Arena; Attendance: 29374; Referee: Andreas Ekberg (Sweden)

3 July 2017 Round 13	BK Häcken	2-0	Hammarby IF	Gothenburg
19:00	Farnerud 45'; Paulinho 56' (pen.)	Report	Degerlund (yellow card) 56'; Martinsson Noguali (yellow card) 93'	Stadium: Bravida Arena; Attendance: 4,009; Referee: Jonas Eriksson (Sweden)

8 July 2017 Round 14	Hammarby IF	3-1	Örebro SK	Stockholm
16:00	Hamad (yellow card) 10'; Torsteinbø 40'; Dibba 49'; Dibba 66'	Report	Ring (yellow card) 22'; Hines-Ike 83'; Omoh (yellow card) 88'; Hines-Ike (yellow card) 92'	Stadium: Tele2 Arena; Attendance: 20,337; Referee: Stefan Johannesson (Sweden)

17 July 2017 Round 15	IF Elfsborg	3-0	Hammarby IF	Borås
19:00	Lundevall 4'; Nilsson 40'; Lundevall 37'	Report		Stadium: Borås Arena; Attendance: 11,092; Referee: Mohammed Al-Hakim (Sweden)

24 July 2017 Round 16	Hammarby IF	2-1	IF Elfsborg	Stockholm
19:00	Sævarsson (yellow card) 6'; Paulsen 21'; Paulsen 54'	Report	Gustavsson 28'; Holmén (yellow card) 33'	Stadium: Tele2 Arena; Attendance: 20,420; Referee: Bojan Pandžić (Sweden)

30 July 2017 Round 17	Jönköpings Södra	1-0	Hammarby IF	Jönköping
17:30	Karlsson (yellow card) 7'; Thelin 27' (pen.); Kozica (yellow card) 84'	Report	Degerlund (yellow card) 29'; Dibba (red card) 36'; Andersen (yellow card) 79'	Stadium: Stadsparksvallen; Attendance: 5,914; Referee: Stefan Johannesson (Sweden)

6 August 2017 Round 18	Hammarby IF	1-2	BK Häcken	Stockholm
15:00	Smárason 90'; Paulsen (yellow card) 93'	Report	Ojala 57'; Ojala (yellow card) 73'; Egbuchulam (yellow card) 78'; Lindgren (yellow card) 93'; Paulinho 95'; Abubakari (yellow card) 100'	Stadium: Tele2 Arena; Attendance: 18,474; Referee: Glenn Nyberg (Sweden)

13 August 2017 Round 19	Hammarby IF	2-2	Östersunds FK	Stockholm
15:00	Smárason (yellow card) 24'; Rômulo 29'; Hamad 79' (pen.)	Report	Mukiibi (yellow card) 15'; Ghoddos 33'; Nouri 93' (pen.)	Stadium: Tele2 Arena; Attendance: 19,870; Referee: Kaspar Sjöberg (Sweden)

21 August 2017 Round 20	Örebro SK	0-3	Hammarby IF	Örebro
19:00	Hines-Ike (yellow card) 27'; Brorsson (yellow card) 82'	Report	Paulsen 8'; Svendsen 56'; Dibba 67'	Stadium: Behrn Arena; Attendance: 8,407; Referee: Patrik Eriksson (Sweden)

26 August 2017 Round 21	AFC Eskilstuna	0-0	Hammarby IF	Eskilstuna
16:00	Omeje (yellow card) 26'; Öhman (yellow card) 66'	Report	Andersen (yellow card) 57'	Stadium: Tunavallen; Attendance: 7,500; Referee: Kristoffer Karlsson (Sweden)

10 September 2017 Round 22	Hammarby IF	1-1	AIK	Stockholm
15:00	Dibba 12'; Dibba (yellow card) 77'	Report	Olsson 47'; Johansson (yellow card) 54'	Stadium: Tele2 Arena; Attendance: 29,306; Referee: Jonas Eriksson (Sweden)

17 September 2017 Round 23	Malmö FF	4-0	Hammarby IF	Malmö
17:30	Rakip 21'; Tinnerholm (yellow card) 30'; Rosenberg (yellow card) 36'; Berget 49'; Safari (yellow card) 53'; Rakip 62'; Christiansen (yellow card) 79'; Jeremejeff 94'	Report	Andersen (yellow card) 18'	Stadium: Swedbank Stadion; Attendance: 18,830; Referee: Johan Hamlin (Sweden)

20 September 2017 Round 24	Hammarby IF	2-1	IFK Göteborg	Stockholm
19:00	Bakiricoglu 58'; Svendsen 61'; Smárason (yellow card) 80'	Report	Diskerud 54'; Rogne (yellow card) 92'	Stadium: Tele2 Arena; Attendance: 20,650; Referee: Mohammed Al-Hakim (Sweden)

24 September 2017 Round 25	Djurgårdens IF	1-1	Hammarby IF	Stockholm
15:00	Bakiricoglu (yellow card) 19'; Paulsen 41'; Paulsen (yellow card) 55'; Tanković (yellow card) 68'; Hamad (yellow card) 89'	Report	Olsson 53'; Olsson (yellow card) 85'	Stadium: Tele2 Arena; Attendance: 24,174; Referee: Bojan Pandžić (Sweden)

1 October 2017 Round 26	Hammarby IF	0-2	IFK Norrköping	Stockholm
17:30	Krusnell (yellow card) 68'; Dibba (yellow card) 71'	Report	Jakobsen 7'; Þórarinsson 34'; Skrabb (yellow card) 42'; Sjölund (yellow card) 72'	Stadium: Tele2 Arena; Attendance: 21,337; Referee: Stefan Johannesson (Sweden)

16 October 2017 Round 27	Kalmar FF	2-0	Hammarby IF	Kalmar
19:00	Fejzullahu (yellow card) 61'; Solheim 79' (o.g.); Ring 88'	Report		Stadium: Guldfågeln Arena; Attendance: 6,514; Referee: Mohammed Al-Hakim (Sweden)

23 October 2017 Round 28	Hammarby IF	3-3	IK Sirius	Stockholm
19:00	Hamad 17'; Svendsen 22'; Paulsen (yellow card) 33'; Svendsen 85'; Dibba (yellow card) 90'	Report	Maholli 34'; Andersson 55'; Maholli 61'; Bergman (yellow card) 75'	Stadium: Tele2 Arena; Attendance: 17,403; Referee: Patrik Eriksson (Sweden)

29 October 2017 Round 29	GIF Sundsvall	1-4	Hammarby IF	Sundsvall
15:00	Gracia 17'; Naurin (yellow card) 75'	Report	Svendsen 42'; Andersen (yellow card) 44'; Svendsen 53'; Paulsen 68'; Smárason 91'	Stadium: Idrottsparken; Attendance: 5,157; Referee: Magnus Lindgren (Sweden)

5 November 2017 Round 30	Hammarby IF	1-3	Halmstad BK	Stockholm
15:00	Tanković 12'; Smárason (yellow card) 64'	Report	Keita 26'; Keita (yellow card) 61'; Mathisen 71'; Haraldsson 85'; Haraldsson (yellow card) 87'	Stadium: Tele2 Arena; Attendance: 20,070; Referee: Johan Hamlin (Sweden)

=== Svenska Cupen ===
==== 2016–17 ====
The tournament continued from the 2016 season.

Kickoff times are in UTC+1.

===== Group stage =====
Pos	Team	Pld	W	D	L	GF	GA	GD	Pts	Qualification
1	Östersunds FK	3	3	0	0	8	2	+6	9	Advance to Knockout stage
2	Hammarby IF	3	1	1	1	6	6	0	4	
3	Varbergs BoIS	3	0	2	1	5	6	−1	2	
4	Nyköpings BIS	3	0	1	2	4	9	−5	1	

Source: Swedish Football Association
Rules for classification: 1) Points; 2) Goal difference; 3) Goals scored; 4) Head-to-head record; 5) Highest ranked team

18 February 2017 Matchday 1	Nyköpings BIS	2-3	Hammarby IF	Nyköping
14:00	Jean-Baptiste (yellow card) 16'; Esséus (yellow card) 29'; Funes 45'; Johansson (yellow card) 66'; Ahmetovic (yellow card) 67'; Ahmetovic 71'; Gruda (yellow card) 84'; Nordenberg (yellow card) 86'	Report	Dibba 14'; Bakiricoglu 17' (pen.); Hamad 38'; Hamad (yellow card) 45'; Solheim (yellow card) 64' (yellow-red card) 67'; Bengtsson (yellow card) 70'; Bakiricoglu (yellow card) 89'	Stadium: Rosvalla IP; Attendance: 2800; Referee: Nermin Cisic (Sweden)

26 February 2017 Matchday 2	Hammarby IF	3-3	Varbergs BoIS	Stockholm
16:00	Már Sævarsson 12'; Hamad 26'; Magyar (yellow card) 27'; Dibba 94'; Hamad (yellow card) 97'	Report	Altemark-Vanneryr 5'; Söderström 10'; Boakye (yellow card) 24'; Söderström 70'; Stanisic (yellow card) 93'	Stadium: Tele2 Arena; Attendance: 6786; Referee: Mohammed Al-Hakim (Sweden)

5 March 2017 Matchday 3	Östersunds FK	1-0	Hammarby IF	Östersund
14:00	Aiesh 6'; Bertilsson (yellow card) 68'; Pettersson (yellow card) 74'; Bergqvist (yellow card) 76'; Ghoddos (yellow card) 82'	Report	Smárason (yellow card) 5'; Aidoo (yellow card) 49'; Rômulo (yellow card) 74'; Hamad (yellow card) 85'	Stadium: Jämtkraft Arena; Attendance: 1500; Referee: Bojan Pandžić (Sweden)

==== 2017–18 ====
The tournament continues into the 2018 season.

===== Qualification stage =====
17 August 2017 Round 2	Akropolis IF	1–3	Hammarby IF	Stockholm
18:30	Sosseh 6'; Vasić (yellow card) 33'	Report	Bengtsson 30'; Degerlund (yellow card) 32'; Tanković 44'; Fenger (yellow card) 45'; Svendsen 92'	Stadium: Grimsta IP; Attendance: 3000; Referee: Patrik Eriksson (Sweden)
