= Pablo Piñones Arce =

Swedish footballer (born 1981)

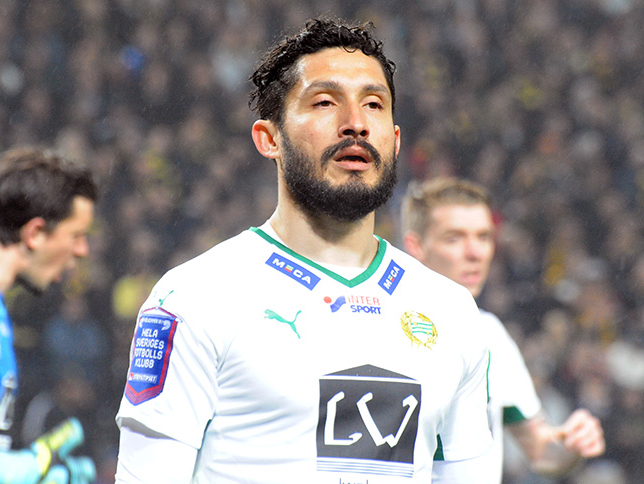
- Piñones-Arce with Hammarby in 2015

Personal information
- Full name: Pablo Jesus Piñones Arce
- Date of birth: 27 August 1981 (age 45)
- Place of birth: Botkyrka, Sweden
- Height: 1.78 m (5 ft 10 in)
- Position: Forward

Team information
- Current team: Fiorentina (women) (head coach)

Youth career
- O'Higgins IKF
- IFK Tumba
- Järlåsa IF
- Jumkils IF
- Hagby IK
- IK Sirius

Senior career*
Years	Team	Apps	(Gls)
1998	IF Brommapojkarna	7	(0)
1999–2001	Venezia	0	(0)
2001–2006	Hammarby IF	95	(20)
2007–2009	Vejle Boldklub	52	(25)
2009	→ IF Brommapojkarna (loan)	16	(1)
2010–2012	IF Brommapojkarna	68	(34)
2013	Östers IF	24	(9)
2014–2015	Hammarby IF	35	(10)
2016	IF Brommapojkarna	0	(0)

International career
1999–2002	Sweden U21	7	(1)

Managerial career
- 2016–2019: Hammarby IF (assistant)
- 2019: IK Frej
- 2020–2024: Hammarby IF (women)
- 2024–2025: Houston Dash
- 2025–: Fiorentina (women)
- * Club domestic league appearances and goals

Pablo Jesus Piñones Arce (born 27 August 1981) is a Swedish former footballer. He played as a forward throughout his career and won 7 caps for the Swedish national under-21 team. He is the head coach of Fiorentina's women's team.

== Playing career ==
After having spent his early career in minor clubs, such as IFK Tumba and IK Sirius, he became a part of the highly successful IF Brommapojkarna squad of 1981-born youngsters. In 1999, he moved to Venezia in Italy, being however featured only with the youth squad, and marking no appearances in the first team. In 2001, he was transferred to Hammarby IF.

The club won the league the same year, Piñones Arce however did not feature in any competitive games. He went on to establish himself as a regular for Hammarby during the following five seasons. In all, he managed to score 20 goals in 95 appearances for the Stockholm-based side.

After the 2006 season, he was not offered a new contract with Hammarby. But his final third of the season showed that he had a lot more to give as he was able to score six goals in only thirteen matches. The club then changed their mind and offered him a contract extension. But instead Pablo chose to sign a 3-year contract with the Danish club Vejle Boldklub running from 1 January 2007.

He enjoyed a successful spell abroad, scoring 25 goals in 52 appearances for Vejle. However, his stint at the club was cut short after a reported conflict with teammate Brian Priske. He then returned to his former youth club IF Brommapojkarna on loan in March 2009, and later signed for the club on a permanent deal.

Piñones Arce kept up a good scoring-form at Brommapojkarna, scoring a total of 34 goals in 68 appearances in both Allsvenskan and Superettan for the club. He was also named the top scorer of Superettan in 2012. In January 2013 he left Brommapojkarna after he and the club could not agree on the financial terms for a new contract.

After spending a year with Östers IF in Allsvenskan, he returned to Hammarby in Superettan for the 2014 season on a two-year deal.

He scored 10 goals during the 2014 season when Hammarby gained a promotion to Allsvenskan. After the 2015 season he left the club when his contract expired, being used more sparingly in the starting lineup during the latter year. Instead, he chose to join Brommapojkarna for a third stint in the Swedish Division 1 on 1 January 2016.

However, Piñones Arce was forced into retirement a few months later due to injuries, at age 35.

== Managerial career ==
In late April 2016, he returned to Hammarby as a first team coach, acting as a link between the squad and the rest of the coaching staff as his primary responsibility. Later the same year, he was promoted to assistant manager when Carlos Banda resigned from this position. Before the start of the 2017 season, it was announced that he would continue as an assistant manager at the club, though Hammarby switched their manager from Nanne Bergstrand to Jakob Michelsen.

On 9 June 2025, Piñones-Arce was appointed as the head coach of Italian club Fiorentina Femminile from American club Houston Dash.

== Career statistics ==
As of 11 January 2016

Club	Season	Division	League		Cup		Europe		Total	
Club	Season	Division	Apps	Goals	Apps	Goals	Apps	Goals	Apps	Goals
IF Brommapojkarna
IF Brommapojkarna	1998	Division 2	7	0	-	-	-	-	7	0
IF Brommapojkarna	Total		7	0	-	-	-	-	7	0
A.C. Venezia
A.C. Venezia	1999–2000	Serie A	0	0	-	-	-	-	0	0
A.C. Venezia	Total		0	0	-	-	-	-	0	0
Hammarby IF
Hammarby IF	2001	Allsvenskan	0	0	-	-	-	-	0	0
Hammarby IF	2002	Allsvenskan	24	2	-	-	1	0	25	2
Hammarby IF	2003	Allsvenskan	23	8	-	-	-	-	23	8
Hammarby IF	2004	Allsvenskan	14	1	-	-	3	0	17	1
Hammarby IF	2005	Allsvenskan	17	3	-	-	-	-	17	3
Hammarby IF	2006	Allsvenskan	17	6	-	-	-	-	17	6
Hammarby IF	Total		95	20	-	-	4	0	99	20
Vejle Boldklub
Vejle Boldklub	2006–2007	Superligaen	10	7	-	-	-	-	10	7
Vejle Boldklub	2007–2008	Danish 1st Division	32	18	-	-	-	-	32	18
Vejle Boldklub	2008–2009	Superligaen	10	1	-	-	-	-	10	1
Vejle Boldklub	Total		52	26	-	-	-	-	52	26
IF Brommapojkarna
IF Brommapojkarna	2009	Allsvenskan	16	1	-	-	-	-	16	1
IF Brommapojkarna	2010	Allsvenskan	21	2	2	1	-	-	23	3
IF Brommapojkarna	2011	Superettan	26	14	1	0	-	-	27	14
IF Brommapojkarna	2012	Superettan	21	18	-	-	-	-	21	18
IF Brommapojkarna	Total		84	35	3	1	-	-	87	36
Östers IF
Östers IF	2013	Allsvenskan	24	9	2	0	-	-	26	9
Östers IF	Total		24	9	2	0	-	-	26	9
Hammarby IF
Hammarby IF	2014	Superettan	24	10	0	0	-	-	24	10
Hammarby IF	2015	Allsvenskan	11	0	0	0	-	-	11	0
Hammarby IF	Total		35	10	0	0	-	-	35	10
IF Brommapojkarna
IF Brommapojkarna	2016	Division 1	0	0	0	0	-	-	0	0
IF Brommapojkarna	Total		0	0	0	0	-	-	0	0
Career total			297	100	5	1	4	0	316	101

== Honours ==
Hammarby FF

- Allsvenskan: 2001
- Superettan: 2014

Individual

- Superettan top scorer: 2012
