= 2014 Superettan =

Superettan
- Season: 2014
- Champions: Hammarby IF
- Promoted: Hammarby IF; GIF Sundsvall
- Relegated: Östers IF; Landskrona BoIS; Husqvarna FF
- Matches: 240
- Goals: 672 (2.8 per match)
- Top goalscorer: Kennedy Bakircioglü (17 goals)
- Best goalkeeper: Alex Horwath (83 save %)
- Biggest home win: Hammarby IF 6–0 Syrianska FC (21 September 2014)
- Biggest away win: IFK Värnamo 0–6 IK Sirius (2 November 2014)
- Highest scoring: Jönköpings Södra IF 6–2 Landskrona BoIS (24 May 2014); Varbergs BoIS 6–2 IFK Värnamo (26 October 2014)
- Highest attendance: 31,074; Hammarby IF 0–0 Ljungskile SK (24 August 2014)
- Lowest attendance: 222; Ängelholms FF 2–0 Husqvarna FF (26 May 2014)
- Total attendance: 784,165
- Average attendance: 3,267

The 2014 Superettan, part of the 2014 Swedish football season, was the 15th season of Superettan, Sweden's second-tier football league in its current format. The 2014 fixtures were released on 20 December 2013. The season started on 5 April 2014 and concluded on 2 November 2014.

Hammarby IF won Superettan this season, their first title and were thus promoted to Allsvenskan after five years absence along with runners-up GIF Sundsvall who returned to the top flight after two years absence. Ljungskile SK advanced to the promotion play-offs but failed to win against Gefle IF.

A total of 16 teams contested the league; 12 returning from the 2013 season, two that were relegated from Allsvenskan and two that were promoted from Division 1.

== Teams ==
A total of 16 teams contested the league, 12 returning from the 2013 season, two relegated from the 2013 Allsvenskan and two promoted from the 2013 Division 1. The top two teams qualified directly for promotion to Allsvenskan, the third had to play a play-off against the fourteenth team from Allsvenskan to decide who would play in Allsvenskan 2015. The bottom two teams qualified directly for relegation to Division 1, the thirteenth and the fourteenth had to play a play-off against the numbers two teams from Division 1 Södra and Division 1 Norra to decide who would play in Superettan 2015.

2013-champions Falkenbergs FF and runner-up Örebro SK were promoted to the Allsvenskan at the end of the 2012 season. They were replaced by Östers IF and Syrianska FC. Örgryte IS and IK Brage were relegated at the end of the 2013 season after finishing in the bottom two places of the table. They were replaced by Division 1 Norra champions IK Sirius and Division 1 Södra champions Husqvarna FF.

=== Stadia and locations ===
Location of the 2014 Superettan teams

Team	Location	Stadium	Turf^{1}	Stadium capacity^{1}
Assyriska FF	Södertälje	Södertälje Fotbollsarena	Artificial	7,500
Degerfors IF	Degerfors	Stora Valla	Natural	12,500
GAIS	Gothenburg	Gamla Ullevi	Natural	18,416
GIF Sundsvall	Sundsvall	Norrporten Arena	Artificial	7,700
Hammarby IF	Stockholm	Tele2 Arena	Artificial	30,000
Husqvarna FF	Huskvarna	Vapenvallen	Natural	5,000
IFK Värnamo	Värnamo	Finnvedsvallen	Natural	5,000
IK Sirius	Uppsala	Studenternas IP	Natural	6,500
Jönköpings Södra IF	Jönköping	Stadsparksvallen	Natural	5,200
Landskrona BoIS	Landskrona	Landskrona IP	Natural	12,000
Ljungskile SK	Ljungskile	Skarsjövallen	Natural	8,000
Syrianska FC	Södertälje	Södertälje Fotbollsarena	Artificial	7,500
Varbergs BoIS	Varberg	Påskbergsvallen	Natural	4,000
Ängelholms FF	Helsingborg	Olympia (Until 22 June 2014)	Natural	17,100
Ängelholms FF	Ängelholm	Ängelholms IP (From 28 June 2014)	Natural	5,000
Östers IF	Växjö	Myresjöhus Arena	Natural	12,000
Östersunds FK	Östersund	Jämtkraft Arena	Artificial	6,000

- ^{1} Correct as of end of 2013 season

=== Personnel and kits ===
Note: Flags indicate national team as has been defined under FIFA eligibility rules. Players and Managers may hold more than one non-FIFA nationality.

Team	Head coach^{1}	Captain	Kit manufacturer	Shirt sponsor
Assyriska FF	(Bosnia and Herzegovina) Valentic Azrudin	(Sweden) David Durmaz	Umbro	Scania
Degerfors IF	(Sweden) Patrik Werner	(Sweden) Tobias Solberg	adidas	Outokumpu
GAIS	(Sweden) Per-Ola Ljung	(Sweden) Kenneth Gustafsson	Hummel	Åbro
GIF Sundsvall	(Sweden) Joel Cedergren (Sweden) Roger Franzén	(Sweden) Kevin Walker	adidas	Various
Hammarby IF	(Sweden) Nanne Bergstrand	(Sweden) Kennedy Bakircioglü	Kappa	Herbalife
Husqvarna FF	(England) Giles Stille	(Sweden) Michell Haidari	adidas	Husqvarna
IFK Värnamo	(Sweden) Jörgen Petersson (Sweden) Peter Johansson	(Sweden) Martin Claesson	adidas	Various
IK Sirius	(Sweden) Kim Bergstrand	(Sweden) Carl Nyström	Nike	Various
Jönköpings Södra IF	(Sweden) Jimmy Thelin	(Sweden) Tommy Thelin	Nike	Various
Landskrona BoIS	(Sweden) Patrik Johansson (interim)	(Sweden) Johnny Lundberg	Masita	bila.nu
Ljungskile SK	(Sweden) Tor-Arne Fredheim	(Sweden) Markus Gustafsson	adidas	Various
Syrianska FC	(Sweden) Zvezdan Milošević	(Sweden) Sharbel Touma	Nike	Aros Kapital
Varbergs BoIS	(Sweden) Jörgen Wålemark	(Sweden) Fredrik Björk	Umbro	Various
Ängelholms FF	(Sweden) Joakim Persson	(Sweden) Björn Westerblad	adidas	Unicolor AB
Östers IF	(Sweden) Roberth Björknesjö	(Sweden) Denis Velić	Puma	IST
Östersunds FK	(England) Graham Potter	(Iraq) Brwa Nouri	adidas	Peab

=== Managerial changes ===
Team	Outgoing manager	Manner of departure	Date of vacancy	Table	Incoming manager	Date of appointment
Hammarby IF	(Sweden) Thomas Dennerby	Mutual consent	6 November 2013	Pre-season	(Sweden) Nanne Bergstrand	6 November 2013
Varbergs BoIS	(Sweden) Halda Kabil	Sacked	15 November 2013	Pre-season	(Sweden) Jörgen Wålemark	21 November 2013
IFK Värnamo	(Sweden) Sören Åkeby	Mutual consent	21 November 2013	Pre-season	(Sweden) Jörgen Petersson	15 December 2013
Östers IF	(Sweden) Andreas Thomsson	Mutual consent	30 December 2013	Pre-season	(Sweden) Roberth Björknesjö	30 December 2013
Syrianska FC	(Sweden) Özcan Melkemichel	Resigned	31 December 2013	Pre-season	(Brazil) Carlos Roberto Cabral	6 January 2014
Syrianska FC	(Brazil) Carlos Roberto Cabral	Resigned	28 January 2014	Pre-season	(Sweden) Stefan Fredriksson	28 January 2014
Syrianska FC	(Sweden) Stefan Fredriksson	Resigned	1 April 2014	Pre-season	(Sweden) Zvezdan Milošević	6 April 2014
Jönköpings Södra IF	(Sweden) Mats Gren	Signed by IFK Göteborg	18 April 2014	14th	(Sweden) Jimmy Thelin	18 April 2014
Assyriska FF	(Bosnia and Herzegovina) Valentic Azrudin	Mutual consent	27 May 2014	15th	(Sweden) Sören Åkeby	29 May 2014
GAIS	(Sweden) Thomas Askebrand	Sacked	27 May 2014	13th	(Sweden) Per-Ola Ljung	13 June 2014
Landskrona BoIS	(Sweden) Jörgen Pettersson	Sacked	11 June 2014	14th	(Sweden) Patrik Johansson	11 June 2014
Assyriska FF	(Sweden) Sören Åkeby	Resigned	17 September 2014	16th	(Bosnia and Herzegovina) Valentic Azrudin	17 September 2014
Husqvarna FF	(Sweden) Niclas Tagesson	Stepped down	20 September 2014	15th	(England) Giles Stille	20 September 2014

== League table ==
Pos	Team	Pld	W	D	L	GF	GA	GD	Pts	Promotion, qualification or relegation
1	Hammarby IF (C, P)	30	18	7	5	68	27	+41	61	Promotion to Allsvenskan
2	GIF Sundsvall (P)	30	19	4	7	55	34	+21	61	Promotion to Allsvenskan
3	Ljungskile SK	30	16	12	2	60	25	+35	60	Qualification to Promotion playoffs
4	Jönköpings Södra IF	30	16	4	10	60	42	+18	52	
5	Östersunds FK	30	12	9	9	40	40	0	45	
6	IK Sirius	30	11	10	9	47	36	+11	43	
7	Degerfors IF	30	10	10	10	47	46	+1	40	
8	Varbergs BoIS	30	10	9	11	38	43	−5	39	
9	IFK Värnamo	30	10	9	11	43	52	−9	39	
10	Syrianska FC	30	11	4	15	37	55	−18	37	
11	GAIS	30	9	8	13	31	38	−7	35	
12	Ängelholms FF	30	9	8	13	30	51	−21	35	
13	Östers IF (R)	30	7	11	12	39	48	−9	32	Qualification to Relegation playoffs
14	Assyriska FF (O)	30	5	12	13	28	44	−16	27	Qualification to Relegation playoffs
15	Landskrona BoIS (R)	30	6	8	16	35	55	−20	26	Relegation to Division 1
16	Husqvarna FF (R)	30	5	7	18	27	49	−22	22	Relegation to Division 1

Source: svenskfotboll.se (in Swedish)
Rules for classification: 1) points; 2) goal difference; 3) number of goals scored.
(C) Champions; (O) Play-off winners; (P) Promoted; (R) Relegated

=== Relegation play-offs ===
6 November 2014
19:00 UTC+1

IK Frej	3 – 0	Östers IF
Lallet 51'; Plavšić 53'; Silfver 55'	Report

Vikingavallen, Täby
Attendance: 1,684
Referee: Per Melin (Gävle)
9 November 2014
15:00 UTC+1

Östers IF	3 – 2	IK Frej
Henningsson 6', 67'; Velić 56'	Report	Lallet 19'; Plavšić 53'

Myresjöhus Arena, Växjö
Attendance: 2,685
Referee: Antti Kanerva (Olofstorp)

IK Frej won 5–3 on aggregate.

6 November 2014
19:00 UTC+1

Örgryte IS	1 – 1	Assyriska FF
Mourad 78'	Report	Papagiannopoulos 39'

Gamla Ullevi, Gothenburg
Attendance: 3,227
Referee: Kaspar Sjöberg (Malmö)
9 November 2014
15:00 UTC+1

Assyriska FF	0 – 0	Örgryte IS
	Report

Södertälje Fotbollsarena, Södertälje
Attendance: 2,511
Referee: Jim Petersson (Motala)

1–1 on aggregate. Assyriska FF won on away goals.

=== Positions by round ===
Team ╲ Round	1	2	3	4	5	6	7	8	9	10	11	12	13	14	15	16	17	18	19	20	21	22	23	24	25	26	27	28	29	30
Hammarby IF	5	1	3	8	8	6	3	2	1	2	2	2	3	3	3	1	1	1	1	3	3	3	2	2	2	2	1	1	2	1
GIF Sundsvall	4	10	4	2	1	1	1	1	2	1	1	1	2	2	2	3	3	3	3	2	1	1	3	3	3	3	2	2	1	2
Ljungskile SK	6	6	8	4	5	8	5	5	4	4	4	3	1	1	1	2	2	2	2	1	2	2	1	1	1	1	3	3	3	3
Jönköpings Södra IF	12	14	14	15	15	10	13	9	6	8	7	8	8	8	7	5	4	5	6	7	5	5	5	5	5	4	4	4	4	4
Östersunds FK	13	15	16	16	16	14	10	10	8	6	6	6	6	7	8	6	6	4	4	4	4	4	4	4	4	5	5	5	5	5
IK Sirius	1	7	10	7	7	5	7	8	11	7	8	7	7	6	6	7	7	6	7	5	6	6	8	8	8	9	6	6	6	6
Degerfors IF	9	13	13	14	14	16	16	16	16	14	13	11	9	11	12	10	11	12	12	11	12	10	10	10	10	7	7	8	9	7
Varbergs BoIS	10	5	2	5	6	4	2	4	5	5	5	5	5	5	5	4	5	7	5	6	8	7	7	7	7	6	9	9	7	8
IFK Värnamo	8	3	6	3	3	2	4	3	3	3	3	4	4	4	4	8	8	9	9	9	7	8	6	6	6	8	8	7	8	9
Syrianska FC	16	16	12	9	4	7	11	10	10	10	10	9	10	9	9	9	9	8	8	8	9	9	9	9	9	10	10	11	11	10
GAIS	7	4	7	11	13	15	11	13	13	15	15	15	13	14	16	14	15	15	13	13	13	13	11	11	11	12	13	10	10	11
Ängelholms FF	15	11	5	6	9	11	12	14	12	12	12	12	12	12	10	11	12	10	10	10	10	11	12	13	13	13	11	12	12	12
Östers IF	2	8	11	12	10	9	8	7	7	9	9	10	11	10	11	13	10	11	11	12	11	12	13	12	12	11	12	13	13	13
Assyriska FF	11	9	9	10	11	12	15	15	15	16	16	14	16	13	15	16	16	16	16	16	16	16	16	16	15	15	15	15	14	14
Landskrona BoIS	14	12	15	13	12	13	14	12	14	13	14	16	15	16	13	12	13	13	15	14	14	14	14	14	14	14	14	14	15	15
Husqvarna FF	3	2	1	1	2	3	6	6	9	11	11	13	14	15	14	15	14	14	14	15	15	15	15	15	16	16	16	16	16	16

Promotion to Allsvenskan
Promotion play-offs
Relegation play-offs
Relegation to Division 1

Source: everysport.com (in Swedish)

== Results ==
Home \ Away	AFF	DIF	GAI	GIFS	HAM	HFF	IFKV	IKS	JSIF	LAN	LSK	SFC	VAR	ÄFF	ÖIF	ÖFK
Assyriska FF		2–2	1–1	1–3	0–1	1–1	1–2	1–1	1–3	1–1	0–4	0–2	0–0	1–1	1–1	0–1
Degerfors IF	3–2		2–1	4–1	1–2	1–1	1–1	1–3	3–0	0–1	3–3	2–0	0–0	4–0	0–2	2–2
GAIS	1–2	0–1		1–0	0–0	2–1	2–2	1–0	2–3	3–1	2–2	0–1	2–0	1–0	0–0	1–3
GIF Sundsvall	2–1	4–1	4–0		3–1	2–1	2–1	1–2	1–0	0–0	0–0	3–1	2–1	4–3	5–1	2–0
Hammarby IF	1–1	5–0	1–3	2–2		3–1	2–2	4–1	5–0	4–0	0–0	6–0	2–0	1–2	3–0	4–2
Husqvarna FF	0–0	0–3	2–0	1–3	1–2		0–0	1–2	0–2	3–1	0–3	0–1	2–1	1–1	1–1	1–4
IFK Värnamo	1–0	3–1	1–1	1–0	0–2	1–0		0–6	2–0	0–3	1–4	2–0	1–1	4–0	3–2	1–2
IK Sirius	2–1	1–1	0–1	0–1	2–1	1–2	3–1		0–1	1–1	2–2	2–2	2–3	0–0	0–0	1–1
Jönköpings Södra IF	4–0	4–2	3–1	4–1	0–4	1–0	0–0	3–1		6–2	1–1	4–0	1–2	2–3	3–3	4–0
Landskrona BoIS	1–2	2–0	2–1	1–2	1–3	0–1	3–1	1–2	0–3		0–0	2–3	1–5	1–1	2–2	0–1
Ljungskile SK	1–0	2–2	0–0	0–0	0–1	2–1	3–2	1–0	3–2	3–2		5–1	3–0	5–0	4–0	1–0
Syrianska FC	0–2	3–1	2–2	1–2	2–4	3–2	2–1	1–5	0–2	1–0	1–1		2–0	0–0	3–1	3–0
Varbergs BoIS	1–1	0–0	1–0	1–0	1–1	3–1	6–2	0–2	1–1	1–1	1–3	2–1		0–1	2–2	2–0
Ängelholms FF	1–1	1–4	1–0	1–2	1–0	2–0	2–2	0–2	1–0	1–2	0–3	1–0	1–2		1–4	2–2
Östers IF	1–2	0–2	0–1	0–2	0–2	2–1	2–2	2–2	2–3	1–1	2–0	1–0	5–1	2–0		0–1
Östersunds FK	1–2	0–0	2–1	3–1	1–1	1–1	1–3	1–1	1–0	3–2	1–1	2–1	3–0	1–2	0–0	

Source: svenskfotboll.se (in Swedish)
Legend: Blue = home team win; Yellow = draw; Red = away team win.

== Season statistics ==
=== Top scorers ===
Rank	Player	Club	Goals
1	(Sweden) Kennedy Bakircioglü	Hammarby IF	17
2	(Sweden) Johan Eklund	GIF Sundsvall	16
3	(Sweden) Stefan Silva	IK Sirius	15
4	(Sweden) Fredrik Olsson	Jönköpings Södra IF	14
4	(Sweden) Peter Samuelsson	Degerfors IF	14
4	(Sweden) David Johannesson	Ljungskile SK	14
7	(Northern Ireland) Daryl Smylie	Jönköpings Södra IF	13
7	(United States) Andrew Stadler	Landskrona BoIS	13
7	(Sweden) Tommy Thelin	Jönköpings Södra IF	13
10	(Sweden) Pa Dibba	GIF Sundsvall	12

=== Top assists ===
Rank	Player	Club	Assists
1	(Sweden) Robert Gojani	Jönköpings Södra IF	11
2	(Norway) Fredrik Torsteinbø	Hammarby IF	10
2	(Sweden) Jonas Lindberg	Ljungskile SK	10
4	(Sweden) Marcus Astvald	Degerfors IF	9

=== Top goalkeepers ===
(Minimum of 10 games played)

Rank	Goalkeeper	Club	GP	GA	SV%	CS
1	(United States) Alex Horwath	Ljungskile SK	30	25	83	14
2	(Sweden) Johannes Hopf	Hammarby IF	30	27	78	13
2	(Montenegro) Zoran Aković	Husqvarna FF	22	32	78	4
4	(Sweden) Tommi Vaiho	GAIS	29	36	76	9
4	(Sweden) August Strömberg	Degerfors IF	22	37	76	6
6	(Sweden) Tommy Naurin	GIF Sundsvall	30	34	75	8
6	(England) Connor Ripley	Östersunds FK	14	17	75	4
8	(Sweden) Björn Åkesson	IFK Värnamo	30	52	74	8
8	(Sweden) Aly Keita	Östersunds FK	14	19	74	3
10	(Sweden) Andreas Andersson	IK Sirius	30	35	73	5

=== Hat-tricks ===
Player	For	Against	Result	Date
(Sweden) David Johannesson	Ljungskile SK	Ängelholms FF	5–0	19 May 2014
(Sweden) Fredrik Olsson	Jönköpings Södra IF	Assyriska FF	4–0	19 July 2014
(Nigeria) Nsima Peter	Varbergs BoIS	Landskrona BoIS	1–5	9 August 2014
(Sweden) Johan Eklund	GIF Sundsvall	Östers IF	5–1	17 August 2014
(Northern Ireland) Daryl Smylie	Jönköpings Södra IF	Degerfors IF	4–2	20 October 2014
(Sweden) Nahir Besara	Hammarby IF	Östersunds FK	4–2	21 October 2014
(Sweden) Karl Söderström	Varbergs BoIS	IFK Värnamo	6–2	26 October 2014
(Nigeria) Moses Ogbu	IK Sirius	IFK Värnamo	0–6	2 November 2014

== See also ==
Competitions

- 2014 Allsvenskan
- 2014 Swedish football Division 1
- 2013–14 Svenska Cupen
