= Tim Markström =

Swedish footballer (born 1986)

Personal information
- Full name: Tim Erik Markström
- Date of birth: 9 October 1986 (age 40)
- Place of birth: Gävle, Sweden
- Height: 1.99 m (6 ft 6 1/2 in)
- Position: Goalkeeper

Team information
- Current team: Gefle IF
- Number: 1

Youth career
- –2004: IK Sätra

Senior career*
| Years | Team | Apps | (Gls) |
| 2005–2007 | Valbo FF | | |
| 2008–2009 | Umeå FC | 18 | (0) |
| 2010–2012 | Sandvikens IF | 59 | (0) |
| 2012 | FC Fredericia | 5 | (0) |
| 2013–2017 | Hammarby IF | 5 | (0) |
| 2013 | → IK Brage (loan) | 13 | (0) |
| 2017–2019 | Sandvikens IF | 57 | (0) |
| 2020–2022 | Gefle IF | 80 | (0) |
| 2025– | Gefle IF | 0 | (0) |
- * Club domestic league appearances and goals as of 8 May 2025

Tim Markström (born 9 October 1986) is a Swedish footballer who plays as a goalkeeper for Gefle IF.

== Career ==
Markström was born and raised in the town of Gävle, where he began his football career at local clubs IK Sätra and Valbo FF.

Between 2008 and 2012 he mostly played in the Swedish third tier, Division 1, representing both Umeå FC and Sandvikens IF. After enjoying a successful stint at the latter club he attracted interest from abroad, finally signing for FC Fredericia in the Danish second tier in August 2012.

He however featured sparingly for Fredericia during the first half of the season and subsequently left the club when his short term-contract came to an end. Instead, he signed for the Stockholm-based club Hammarby IF in Superettan before the 2013 season.

Markström was being used as a backup for Johannes Hopf during his first three seasons at the club, also being sent on loan to IK Brage during the second half of the 2013 season. Hammarby enjoyed a promotion to Allsvenskan in 2014, where Markström would make his competitive debut for the side on 30 May 2015. He played the whole game as Hammarby drew, 2-2, against Halmstad BK on home turf.

He would eventually make another four appearances for Hammarby during the 2015 season, before being replaced by the Icelandic international Ögmundur Kristinsson. Markström signed a new two-year contract with the club during the fall the same year.

On 13 July 2017, Markström left Hammarby by mutual consent.

== Personal ==
Tim's brother Jacob is a professional ice hockey goaltender currently playing for the Florida Panthers in the National Hockey League (NHL).

Their father Anders Markström was also a professional football goalkeeper during the 1980s, representing both Hammarby IF and Gefle IF in the Swedish top tier.
