= Fredrik Torsteinbø =

Norwegian footballer (born 1991)

Personal information
- Date of birth: 13 March 1991 (age 35)
- Place of birth: Stavanger, Norway
- Height: 1.82 m (5 ft 11 1/2 in)
- Position: Midfielder

Team information
- Current team: Sandnes Ulf
- Number: 14

Senior career*
Years	Team	Apps	(Gls)
2009–2010	Vidar		
2011–2013	Sandnes Ulf	81	(14)
2014–2017	Hammarby IF	75	(12)
2017–2022	Viking	112	(14)
2023–	Sandnes Ulf	13	(0)

International career
2013	Norway U23	2	(0)
- * Club domestic league appearances and goals as of 18 November 2023

Fredrik Torsteinbø (born 13 March 1991) is a Norwegian footballer who plays for Sandnes Ulf.

== Club career ==
He started his senior career in the Norwegian team Vidar in 2009.

In 2011, he signed for Norwegian team Sandnes Ulf. He made his debut on 3 April 2011 against Bryne, they lost the game 0–1. He eventually established himself as a key player in the Rogaland-outfit, playing as a regular in the Norwegian highest division Eliteserien in 2012 and 2013.

In January 2014, Torsteinbø was presented as a new player for Hammarby IF in the Swedish second tier Superettan, being signed on a free transfer. In his first season at the club, he scored five goals and ten assists to help Hammarby achieve promotion to Allsvenskan, the top flight.

During the upcoming 2015 season he once again managed to score 5 goals as Hammarby finished 11th in the league. In the 2016 season he was used less regularly in the starting lineup, playing in an unusual position as a left defender during the first half of the campaign. However, he chose to renew his tie to the club in the middle of the season, signing a new contract that will last until the end of 2018.

On 20 July 2017, Torsteinbø completed a move back to his city of birth, Stavanger, by signing a contract with Viking until the end of 2020.

On 11 January 2023, Torsteinbø returned to Sandnes Ulf on a two-year contract.

== Career statistics ==
As of match played 6 November 2022

Appearances and goals by club, season and competition
Club	Season	League			National Cup		Europe		Other		Total	
Club	Season	Division	Apps	Goals	Apps	Goals	Apps	Goals	Apps	Goals	Apps	Goals
Sandnes Ulf	2011	1. divisjon	28	5	3	0	–		–		31	5
Sandnes Ulf	2012	Eliteserien	29	5	1	0	–		2 (Note: Appearances in relegation play-offs)	0	32	5
Sandnes Ulf	2013	Eliteserien	24	4	2	0	–		–		26	4
Sandnes Ulf	Total		81	14	6	0	–		2	0	89	14
Hammarby	2014	Superettan	22	5	4	0	–		–		26	5
Hammarby	2015	Allsvenskan	21	5	2	0	–		–		23	5
Hammarby	2016	Allsvenskan	22	0	5	0	–		–		27	0
Hammarby	2017	Allsvenskan	10	2	2	0	–		–		12	2
Hammarby	Total		75	12	13	0	–		–		88	12
Viking	2017	Eliteserien	10	1	0	0	–		–		10	1
Viking	2018	1. divisjon	25	4	2	0	–		–		27	4
Viking	2019	Eliteserien	23	5	7	1	–		–		30	6
Viking	2020	Eliteserien	30	4	–		1 (Note: Appearance in UEFA Europa League)	0	–		31	4
Viking	2021	Eliteserien	10	0	0	0	–		–		10	0
Viking	2022	Eliteserien	14	0	1	0	3 (Note: Appearances in UEFA Europa Conference League)	0	–		18	0
Viking	Total		112	14	10	1	4	0	–		126	15
Career total			268	40	29	1	4	0	2	0	303	41

== Honours ==
Viking

- 1. divisjon: 2018
- Norwegian Football Cup: 2019
