= Viktor Nordin =

Swedish footballer

Personal information
- Full name: Viktor Edvin Nordin
- Date of birth: 18 January 1996 (age 30)
- Place of birth: Stockholm, Sweden
- Height: 1.75 m (5 ft 9 in)
- Position: Midfielder

Team information
- Current team: Sandvikens IF
- Number: 6

Youth career
- –2004: Atlas Copco IF
- 2005–2012: Hammarby IF

Senior career*
Years	Team	Apps	(Gls)
2013–2015	Hammarby IF	10	(0)
2015	→ IK Frej	10	(0)
2016–	Sandvikens IF		

International career^{‡}
2011–2013	Sweden U17	17	(1)
2013–2015	Sweden U19	14	(2)
- * Club domestic league appearances and goals as of 25 January 2016 ‡ National team caps and goals as of 31 March 2015

Viktor Edvin Nordin (born 31 January 1996) is a Swedish footballer who plays for Sandvikens IF as a midfielder.

== Honours ==
Hammarby IF

- Superettan: 2014

Sweden U17

- FIFA U-17 World Cup third place: 2013
