= Ögmundur Kristinsson (footballer, born 1989) =

Icelandic footballer

Personal information
- Date of birth: 19 June 1989 (age 37)
- Place of birth: Reykjavík, Iceland
- Height: 1.93 m (6 ft 4 in)
- Position: Goalkeeper

Team information
- Current team: Víkingur Reykjavík
- Number: 47

Youth career
- Fram

Senior career*
Years	Team	Apps	(Gls)
2006–2014	Fram	78	(0)
2014–2015	Randers	2	(0)
2015–2017	Hammarby	61	(0)
2017–2018	Excelsior	15	(0)
2018–2020	AEL	62	(0)
2020–2023	Olympiacos	3	(0)
2023–2024	A.E. Kifisia	6	(0)
2024–2025	Valur	13	(0)
2026–	Víkingur Reykjavík	3	(0)

International career^{‡}
2006–2008	Iceland U19	2	(0)
2008	Iceland U21	1	(0)
2014–	Iceland	19	(0)
- * Club domestic league appearances and goals as of 1 November 2026 ‡ National team caps and goals as of 8 June 2021

Ögmundur Kristinsson (born 19 June 1989) is an Icelandic professional footballer who plays as a goalkeeper for Besta deild karla club Víkingur Reykjavík and the Iceland national team.

== Club career ==
=== Fram ===
Ögmundur made his senior debut for Fram on 12 June 2006, a week before his 17th birthday, in the 2006 season of the Icelandic second tier, starting against Haukar in the absence of Gunnar Sigurðsson. He kept a clean sheet in a 3–0 away win. His next match came in the 2009 Icelandic Premier League season in the last match of the season, entering as a half-time substitute for Hannes Þór Halldórsson and keeping a clean sheet in the second half as Fram lost 1–0 to Þróttur R. at home. He remained a reserve goalkeeper to Hannes Þór Halldórsson in the 2010 season. When Hannes transferred to KR after the 2010 season Ögmundur became the main goalkeeper for Fram. He has played every league game since the start of the 2011 season.

On 30 December 2011, Ögmundur was given the honorary title "Fram Sportsman of the Year", the first footballer to hold that title.

=== Trials abroad and Randers ===
After the 2013 season he went on a trial to Norwegian club Sandnes Ulf and Scottish club Motherwell FC. His trial at Motherwell went well, although they were not looking to buy a goalkeeper at that time.

On 16 July 2014, half-way through the Icelandic 2014 season, Ögmundur joined Danish club Randers, signing a one-year contract. During the 2014–15 Superliga season, Ögmundur only made four league appearances while mostly acting as a back-up to Karl-Johan Johnsson.

=== Hammarby ===
On 2 June 2015 Ögmundur signed a 3-year deal with Hammarby IF, eventually making 15 appearances in the 2015 Allsvenskan for his new side. Ögmundur replaced Johannes Hopf as Hammarby's first choice goalkeeper halfway through the season, after the latter chose to make a move abroad.

In 2016, he scored his first competitive goal in his senior career when he scored the deciding penalty in the Swedish Cup semifinal against local rivals AIK. Ögmundur played all 30 league games as Hammarby finished 11th in the table, keeping 7 clean sheets throughout the year.

He started the 2017 season as Hammarby's starting goalkeeper, under the reign of new manager Jakob Michelsen. Ögmundur was criticized by the latter in May 2017 after several weak performances. In late July the same year, Hammarby brought in Johan Wiland from reigning champions Malmö FF. Ögmundur was deemed surplus to requirements after the new acquisition.

=== Excelsior ===
On 31 August 2017, Ögmundur transferred to Excelsior of the Eredivisie. He reportedly moved on a free, and signed a one-year deal (with an option for a further) with the Dutch club.

=== AEL ===
On 2 August 2018, Super League Greece club AEL officially announced the signing of Kristinsson on a two-year deal.

On 26 February 2020, he signed a two-year contract extension.

=== Olympiacos ===
On 7 July 2020, Kristinsson signed a three years' contract with Greek Super League club Olympiacos for a transfer fee of €400,000 from AEL.

=== Valur ===
On 5 July 2024, News started to spread that Kristinsson signed a three years' contract with Icelandic giants Valur on a free transfer from Greek second division club A.E. Kifisia.

== International career ==
Ögmundur made his first international appearance on 4 June 2014 in a match against Estonia, when he came on as a substitute for Gunnleifur Gunnleifsson at half-time. In that second half, he kept a clean sheet, to maintain Iceland's 1–0 lead.

On 13 October 2015, Ögmundur made his competitive debut in a UEFA Euro 2016 qualifying game against Turkey, with Iceland already being qualified for the championship. Despite putting on a solid effort, Iceland went on to lose with the score of 1–0 after a free kick goal by Selçuk İnan in the 89th minute.

He was selected for EURO 2016.

Played on China Cup 2017, where Iceland won silver medals

== Personal life ==
Ögmundur has a bachelor of law and has stated that he wishes to become a lawyer after his football career.

His favourite team is Manchester United whose former Danish goalkeeper Peter Schmeichel was his childhood hero.

On 9 July 2021, it was made known that he and his wife export wines from Greece to Iceland.

== Career statistics ==
=== Club ===
As of 19 January 2022

Appearances and goals by club, season and competition
Club	Season	League			National cup		Continental		Other		Total	
Club	Season	Division	Apps	Goals	Apps	Goals	Apps	Goals	Apps	Goals	Apps	Goals
Fram	2006	1. deild	1	0	0	0	—		1	0	2	0
Fram	2007	Úrvalsdeild	0	0	0	0	—		4	0	4	0
Fram	2008	Úrvalsdeild	0	0	0	0	—		0	0	0	0
Fram	2009	Úrvalsdeild	1	0	0	0	—		5	0	6	0
Fram	2010	Úrvalsdeild	0	0	1	0	—		2	0	3	0
Fram	2011	Úrvalsdeild	22	0	2	0	—		7	0	31	0
Fram	2012	Úrvalsdeild	22	0	3	0	—		9	0	34	0
Fram	2013	Úrvalsdeild	22	0	5	0	—		6	0	33	0
Fram	2014	Úrvalsdeild	10	0	2	0	2	0	7	0	21	0
Fram	Total		78	0	13	0	2	0	41	0	134	0
Randers	2014–15	Danish Superliga	2	0	3	0	—		—		5	0
Hammarby IF	2015	Allsvenskan	15	0	—		—		—		15	0
Hammarby IF	2016	Allsvenskan	30	0	5	0	—		—		35	0
Hammarby IF	2017	Allsvenskan	16	0	3	0	—		—		19	0
Hammarby IF	Total		61	0	8	0	—		—		69	0
Excelsior	2017–18	Eredivisie	15	0	1	0	—		—		16	0
AEL	2018–19	Super League Greece	30	0	4	0	—		—		34	0
AEL	2019–20	Super League Greece	32	0	1	0	—		—		33	0
AEL	Total		62	0	5	0	—		—		67	0
Olympiacos	2020–21	Super League Greece	2	0	3	0	—		—		5	0
Olympiacos	2021–22	Super League Greece	1	0	3	0	—		—		4	0
Olympiacos	2022–23	Super League Greece	0	0	0	0	—		—		0	0
Olympiacos	Total		3	0	6	0	—		—		9	0
A.E. Kifisia	2023–24	Super League Greece	3	0	0	0	—		—		3	0
Career total			224	0	36	0	2	0	41	0	303	0

== Honours ==
Fram

- First Division (Second tier): 2006
- Icelandic Cup: 2013

Olympiacos

- Super League Greece: 2020–21, 2021–22
