= Måns Söderqvist =

Swedish footballer

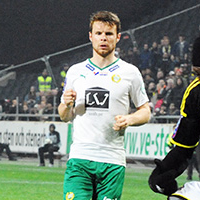

Personal information
- Full name: Måns Oskar Söderqvist
- Date of birth: 8 February 1993 (age 33)
- Place of birth: Emmaboda, Sweden
- Height: 1.71 m (5 ft 7 in)
- Position: Forward

Team information
- Current team: Oskarshamns AIK

Youth career
- Emmaboda IS

Senior career*
Years	Team	Apps	(Gls)
2010–2014	Kalmar FF	78	(16)
2015–2016	Hammarby IF	33	(3)
2016–2019	Kalmar FF	52	(4)
2020–2021	Trelleborg	30	(0)
2022–	Oskarshamns AIK	2	(1)

International career^{‡}
2008–2010	Sweden U17	24	(4)
2011–2012	Sweden U19	11	(0)
2012–2014	Sweden U21	5	(0)
- * Club domestic league appearances and goals as of 9 April 2022 ‡ National team caps and goals as of 5 June 2014

Måns Oskar Söderqvist (born 8 February 1993) is a Swedish professional footballer who plays for Oskarshamns AIK as a forward.

== Club career ==
On 23 December 2021, Söderqvist joined Oskarshamns AIK for the 2022 season.
