= Kennedy Bakircioglu =

Swedish footballer (born 1980)

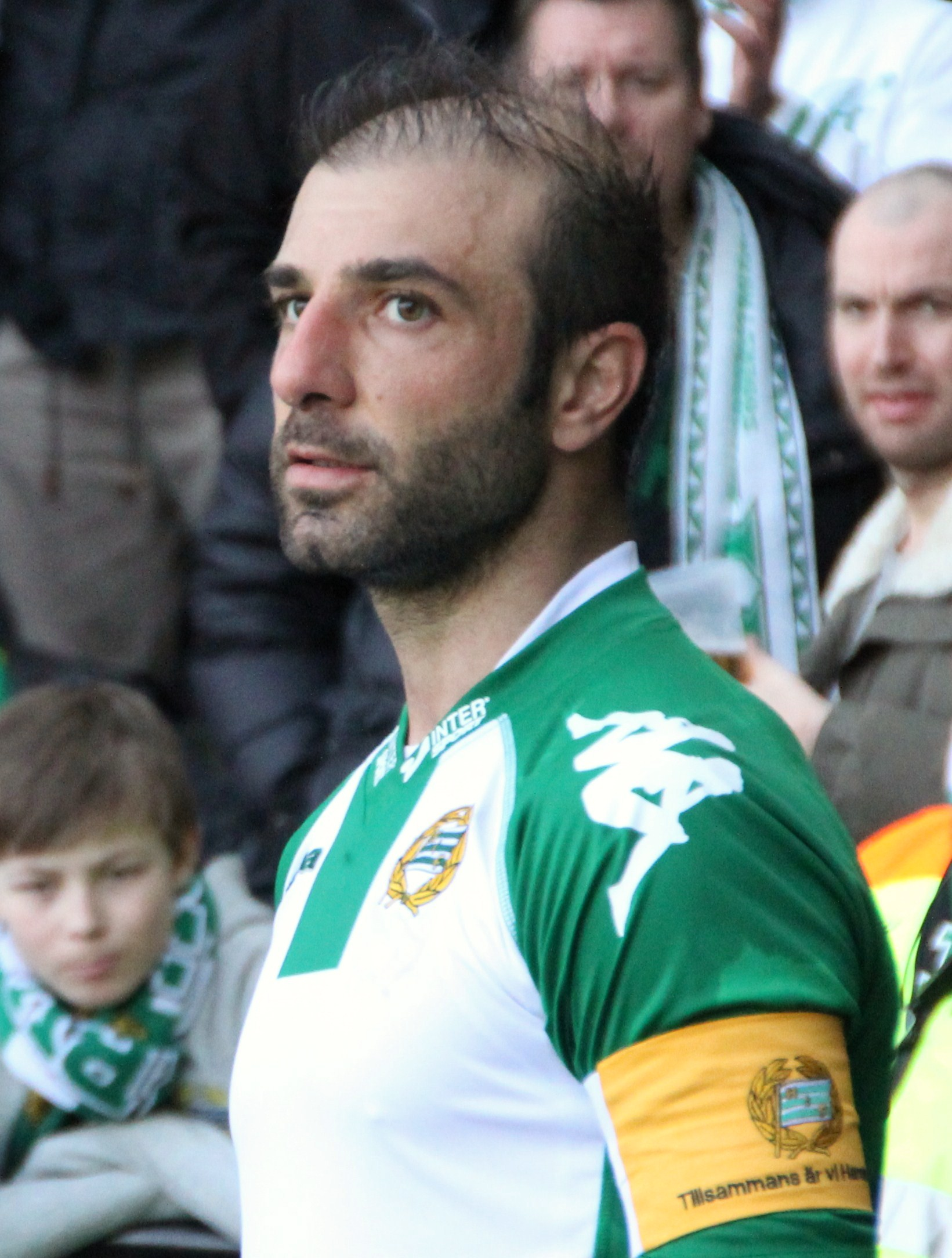
- Bakircioglu with Hammarby in 2013

Personal information
- Full name: Kennedy Bakircioglu
- Date of birth: 2 November 1980 (age 46)
- Place of birth: Södertälje, Sweden
- Height: 1.81 m (5 ft 11 in)
- Position: Midfielder

Senior career*
| Years | Team | Apps | (Gls) |
| 1996–1998 | Assyriska | 34 | (10) |
| 1999–2003 | Hammarby | 127 | (38) |
| 2003–2005 | Iraklis | 24 | (4) |
| 2005–2007 | Twente | 66 | (23) |
| 2007–2010 | Ajax | 35 | (6) |
| 2010–2012 | Racing Santander | 39 | (6) |
| 2012–2018 | Hammarby | 142 | (41) |
| Total | | 467 | (128) |

International career
| 1996 | Sweden U17 | 6 | (0) |
| 1998–1999 | Sweden U19 | 22 | (5) |
| 1999–2001 | Sweden U21 | 14 | (1) |
| 2001–2008 | Sweden | 14 | (0) |
- * Club domestic league appearances and goals

Kennedy Bakircioglu (born 2 November 1980) is a Swedish former professional footballer who played as a midfielder.

He is best remembered for his time with Hammarby, with whom he won the 2001 Allsvenskan and 2014 Superettan titles. He also represented Assyriska, Iraklis, Twente, Ajax and Racing de Santander, in a 22-year career.

A full international between 2001 and 2008, Bakircioglu won 14 caps for the Sweden national team.

== Early life ==
Bakircioglu's family are ethnic Assyrians, followers of the Syriac Orthodox Church. The family arrived in Sweden in 1972 from Midyat, Turkey.

Born in Södertälje, Bakircioglu was named after the former United States president John F. Kennedy. His father Benjamin was one of the first to play for newly founded Assyriska FF, a club established by the Assyrian diaspora, going on to become its record goal scorer.

== Club career ==
=== Assyriska ===
Bakircioglu started his professional career with Assyriska, making his senior debut in 1996 at age 15. He would soon establish himself as a regular starter in Division 1, by then in the Swedish second tier, despite his young age.

In 1998, Bakircioglu saw a major breakthrough in his senior career and scored nine goals whilst also providing eight assists, in 25 league games. He had a trial with Manchester United during the winter of that year, but did not impress enough to secure a contract with the English team.

While on travel with the squad, the 17-year-old Bakircioglu and his teammate Louay Chanko were attacked by a group of neo-Nazis in a candy shop. Also with them was Fredrik Samuelsson, who was not targeted because he was blonde.

=== Hammarby ===
Before the start of 1999, Bakircioglu transferred to Hammarby in Allsvenskan. He scored his first competitive goal for the Stockholm-based side on 1 July the same year, in a 3–0 home win against IFK Norrköping. He quickly became a fan favourite at his new club, and ended the season playing 25 league matches, scoring twice.

On 4 July 1999, Bakircioglu made his continental debut in the second round of the UEFA Intertoto Cup, a 4–0 home victory over Gomel. In the away leg, he scored a brace to help to a 2–2 draw and subsequent qualification. At the end of the year, he was voted "Allsvenskan newcomer of the year".

During the 2000 campaign, Bakircioglu was a key player in manager Sören Cratz's squad, playing as attacking midfielder behind the strikers. He made 26 league appearances and netted five times, but the side finished eighth.

In 2001, Bakircioglu scored eight goals in 26 games to lead the team to their first-ever national championship. He also provided seven assists throughout the domestic tournament, and was praised by pundits as player of the season at Hammarby. He scored in the title-deciding fixture against Örgryte IS on 21 October, a 3–2 home win.

Bakircioglu continued 2002 in similar fashion, and netted 11 goals from 26 appearances. His team, however, suffered a tough year in the table and failed to produce any sort of challenge, eventually ending in ninth position. As reigning Swedish champions, they took part in the second qualifying round of the UEFA Champions League where they faced the Serbian SuperLiga's Partizan, with the player being featured in both legs of the 5–1 aggregate loss. He reportedly attracted interest from Beşiktaş from Turkey during the season, but the deal fell through in the last minute.

In the 2003 campaign, Bakircioglu scored six goals in the league's first seven rounds – in an eventual total of 12– as Hammarby went on an unbeaten streak. In September, the club's board of directors suspended both him and Mikael Andersson because the parties could not agree to extend their outgoing contracts. The decision was, however, revoked after only a few days, roughly at the same time as the team was surpassed by city rivals Djurgårdens at the top of table and eventually finished second.

Bakircioglu left on a free transfer at the end of the year. A year after his departure, he was voted the club's fourth greatest player of all time.

=== Iraklis ===
On 12 January 2004, Bakircioglu moved to the Super League Greece with Iraklis. He signed a two-and-a-half-year contract, linking up with compatriot Mats Jingblad who held the managerial position at his new club.

Bakircioglu was sparingly used in his only full campaign in Thessaloniki, with Jingblad having been dismissed shortly after his arrival.

=== Twente ===
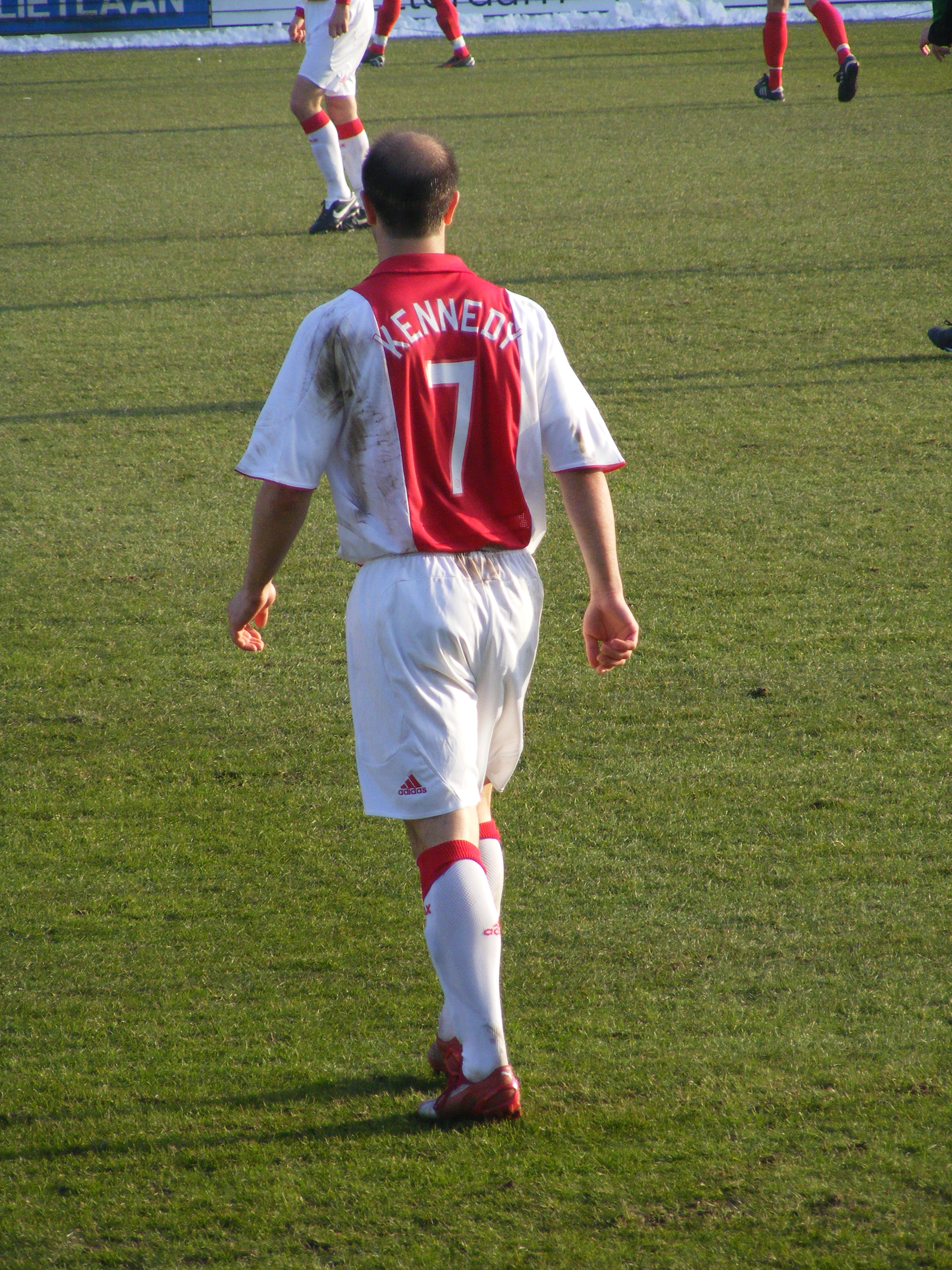
Bakircioglu playing for Ajax in 2007

Bakircioglu moved teams and countries again in the 2005 off-season, joining Twente in the Netherlands and impressing manager Fred Rutten straight away to become a first-team regular. In 2006–07, he scored 15 goals in the Eredivisie as the Enschede side finished fourth and qualified for the UEFA Cup.

=== Ajax ===
On 5 May 2007, newspaper De Telegraaf announced that Bakircioglu had reached an agreement with fellow Dutch top-division Ajax. He was officially signed ten days later, and scored on his official debut, an 8–1 away rout of De Graafschap.

In August 2008, new manager Marco van Basten deemed Bakircioglu surplus to requirements, but the latter decided to stay, being restricted to only 17 league games over two seasons and totalling 53. He did manage, however, a crucial goal for the Amsterdam team, in the 2008–09 UEFA Cup, in a 1–0 away win against Fiorentina in the round of 32 (2–1 aggregate victory).

=== Racing Santander ===
Bakircioglu left Ajax in June 2010, signing for Spain's Racing de Santander early in the following month. He started in all but two matches he appeared in his first season, as the Cantabrians retained their La Liga status. Three of his league goals came in the last month of competition, against Mallorca (2–0 home win), Atlético Madrid (2–1, home) and Athletic Bilbao (1–2 loss also at the Campos de Sport de El Sardinero).

Bakircioglu spent the vast majority of 2011–12 nursing an achilles tendon injury, and Racing would also return to Segunda División after one full decade in the top flight.

=== Return to Hammarby ===
At the end of August 2012, Bakircioglu returned to Hammarby, now in the Superettan. On 23 June 2013, they faced Ängelholms FF in the last football game at the Söderstadion, which had been the club's home ground since 1967; the game ended 1–1, with his team securing a late draw when he scored from a free kick.

Bakircioglu led all scorers with 17 goals and contributed seven decisive passes in the 2014 campaign, helping to a return to the top division whilst also acting as captain. A regular in both 2015 and 2016, with the team finishing eleventh on both occasions, the 36-year-old signed a new one-year contract in December 2016.

In his later years, Bakircioglu repositioned himself as a central midfielder, dictating the game as a playmaker. He agreed to a new one-year deal on 22 October 2017, and simultaneously announced that he would retire from football when it expired. On 1 October 2018, at the end of his last season, he scored from a spectacular free kick to make it 3–0 in the league fixture against IFK Göteborg, and proceeded to celebrate the goal in front of the home fans by catching and drinking from a cup of beer that was thrown towards him from the stands.

== International career ==
Bakircioglu made over 40 appearances for Sweden at under-17, under-19 and under-21 levels, before making his full debut on 20 November 2003 in a friendly against the Czech Republic. He appeared in three UEFA Euro 2008 qualifying games in 2007, but did not make the squad for the final tournament.

Bakircioglu played his 14th and last international match on 26 May 2008, in a friendly with Slovenia.

== In popular culture ==
Bakircioglu gained fame and cult status early in his career thanks to the computer game Championship Manager: Season 01/02, where he was considered one of the greatest "hidden gem" players of all time.

== Career statistics ==
=== Club ===
Appearances and goals by club, season and competition
| Club | Season | League | | | Cup | | Europe | | Other | | Total | |
| Club | Season | Division | Apps | Goals | Apps | Goals | Apps | Goals | Apps | Goals | Apps | Goals |
|---|---|---|---|---|---|---|---|---|---|---|---|---|
| Assyriska | 1996 | Division 2 Västra Svealand | 1 | 0 | | | — | | — | | 1 | 0 |
| Assyriska | 1997 | Division 1 Norra | 8 | 1 | | | — | | — | | 8 | 1 |
| Assyriska | 1998 | Division 1 Norra | 25 | 9 | | | — | | — | | 25 | 9 |
| Assyriska | Total | | 34 | 10 | | | — | | — | | 34 | 10 |
| Hammarby | 1999 | Allsvenskan | 25 | 2 | | | 1 | 0 | — | | 26 | 2 |
| Hammarby | 2000 | Allsvenskan | 26 | 5 | | | — | | — | | 26 | 5 |
| Hammarby | 2001 | Allsvenskan | 26 | 8 | | | — | | — | | 26 | 8 |
| Hammarby | 2002 | Allsvenskan | 25 | 11 | | | 2 | 0 | — | | 27 | 11 |
| Hammarby | 2003 | Allsvenskan | 25 | 12 | | | — | | — | | 25 | 12 |
| Hammarby | Total | | 127 | 38 | | | 3 | 0 | — | | 130 | 38 |
| Iraklis | 2003–04 | Alpha Ethniki | 7 | 2 | 0 | 0 | — | | — | | 7 | 2 |
| Iraklis | 2004–05 | Alpha Ethniki | 17 | 2 | 2 | 0 | — | | — | | 19 | 2 |
| Iraklis | Total | | 24 | 4 | 2 | 0 | — | | — | | 26 | 4 |
| Twente | 2005–06 | Eredivisie | 32 | 8 | | | — | | — | | 32 | 8 |
| Twente | 2006–07 | Eredivisie | 34 | 15 | | | 4 | 0 | — | | 38 | 15 |
| Twente | Total | | 66 | 23 | | | 4 | 0 | — | | 70 | 23 |
| Ajax | 2007–08 | Eredivisie | 18 | 3 | 2 | 0 | 5 | 0 | 1 | 0 | 26 | 3 |
| Ajax | 2008–09 | Eredivisie | 8 | 1 | 1 | 0 | 3 | 1 | — | | 12 | 2 |
| Ajax | 2009–10 | Eredivisie | 9 | 2 | 3 | 2 | 3 | 1 | — | | 15 | 5 |
| Ajax | Total | | 35 | 6 | 6 | 2 | 11 | 2 | 1 | 0 | 53 | 10 |
| Racing Santander | 2010–11 | La Liga | 32 | 6 | 2 | 1 | — | | — | | 34 | 7 |
| Racing Santander | 2011–12 | La Liga | 7 | 0 | 3 | 0 | — | | — | | 10 | 0 |
| Racing Santander | Total | | 39 | 6 | 5 | 1 | — | | — | | 44 | 7 |
| Hammarby | 2012 | Superettan | 9 | 5 | — | | — | | — | | 9 | 5 |
| Hammarby | 2013 | Superettan | 23 | 7 | 3 | 0 | — | | — | | 26 | 7 |
| Hammarby | 2014 | Superettan | 28 | 17 | 4 | 1 | — | | — | | 32 | 18 |
| Hammarby | 2015 | Allsvenskan | 22 | 4 | — | | — | | — | | 22 | 4 |
| Hammarby | 2016 | Allsvenskan | 27 | 6 | 6 | 3 | — | | — | | 33 | 9 |
| Hammarby | 2017 | Allsvenskan | 21 | 1 | 4 | 1 | — | | — | | 25 | 2 |
| Hammarby | 2018 | Allsvenskan | 12 | 1 | 3 | 1 | — | | — | | 15 | 2 |
| Hammarby | Total | | 142 | 41 | 20 | 6 | — | | — | | 162 | 47 |
| Career total | | | 467 | 128 | 33 | 9 | 18 | 2 | 1 | 0 | 519 | 139 |

=== International ===
Appearances and goals by national team and year
| National team | Year | Apps | Goals |
|---|---|---|---|
| Sweden | 2001 | 1 | 0 |
| Sweden | 2002 | 1 | 0 |
| Sweden | 2003 | 3 | 0 |
| Sweden | 2004 | 0 | 0 |
| Sweden | 2005 | 0 | 0 |
| Sweden | 2006 | 2 | 0 |
| Sweden | 2007 | 5 | 0 |
| Sweden | 2008 | 2 | 0 |
| Total | | 14 | 0 |

== Honours ==
Hammarby

- Allsvenskan: 2001
- Superettan: 2014

Ajax

- KNVB Cup: 2009–10
- Johan Cruyff Shield: 2007

Sweden

- King's Cup: 2003

Individual

- Allsvenskan Newcomer of the Year: 1999
- Superettan top scorer: 2014
