= Marko Mihajlović =

Bosnia and Herzegovina footballer

Personal information
- Date of birth: 20 August 1987 (age 39)
- Place of birth: Foča, SR Bosnia and Herzegovina, Yugoslavia
- Height: 1.88 m (6 ft 2 in)
- Position: Defender

Team information
- Current team: Sloga Kraljevo
- Number: 13

Senior career*
Years	Team	Apps	(Gls)
2008–2009	Novi Sad	12	(0)
2010	Dalkurd	20	(2)
2011–2013	Umeå FC	62	(5)
2013	Brage	13	(1)
2014–2015	Hammarby	10	(2)
2015	Syrianska	10	(0)
2016	Dinamo Batumi	10	(1)
2016–2017	Al-Ramtha		
2017–2019	Salam Zgharta	34	(1)
2019	Syrianska	4	(0)
2020–	Sloga Kraljevo	14	(1)
- * Club domestic league appearances and goals as of 18:32, 1 June 2021 (UTC)

Marko Mihajlović (born 20 August 1987) is a Bosnia and Herzegovina professional footballer who plays as a defender for Serbian First League club Sloga Kraljevo.

== Career ==
Mihajlović signed for Georgian club Dinamo Batumi ahead of the second half of the 2015–16 season. In 2016, he signed for Al-Ramtha in Jordan, then moved to Salam Zgharta in the Lebanese Premier League one season later.

In 2020, Mihajlović signed for Serbian club Sloga Kraljevo. He debuted on 22 August 2020, in a 2–0 home defeat to Kabel. On 24 October 2020, Mihajlović scored his first goal in a 1–1 draw against Železničar Pančevo.
