= Markus Gustafsson =

Swedish footballer (born 1989)

Personal information
- Full name: Markus Karl Bengt Gustafsson
- Date of birth: 6 March 1989 (age 37)
- Place of birth: Sweden
- Height: 1.83 m (6 ft 0 in)
- Position: Midfielder

Youth career
- IFK Fjärås

Senior career*
Years	Team	Apps	(Gls)
2007–2011	Örgryte IS	59	(5)
2011–2012	GAIS	48	(3)
2013–2014	Viborg FF	8	(0)
2014–2015	Ljungskile SK	55	(1)
2016–2019	IF Brommapojkarna	108	(16)

International career
2004–2006	Sweden U17	18	(1)
2007–2008	Sweden U19	4	(1)
- * Club domestic league appearances and goals as of 21:33, 2 February 2020 (UTC)

Markus Karl Bengt Gustafsson (born 6 March 1989) is a Swedish footballer who most recently played for IF Brommapojkarna as a midfielder.
