= Tommy Thelin =

Swedish footballer

Personal information
- Full name: Tommy Jörgen Thelin
- Date of birth: 22 September 1983 (age 43)
- Place of birth: Jönköping, Sweden
- Height: 1.81 m (5 ft 11 in)
- Position: Forward

Youth career
- 2004: Haga

Senior career*
Years	Team	Apps	(Gls)
2005–2007	Åtvidaberg	63	(12)
2007–2019	Jönköping	350	(90)
- * Club domestic league appearances and goals

Tommy Thelin (born 22 September 1983) is a Swedish retired footballer. His brother Jimmy is a former footballer.

On 2 November 2019, 36-year old Thelin announced his retirement.
