= Alexander Henningsson =

Swedish footballer

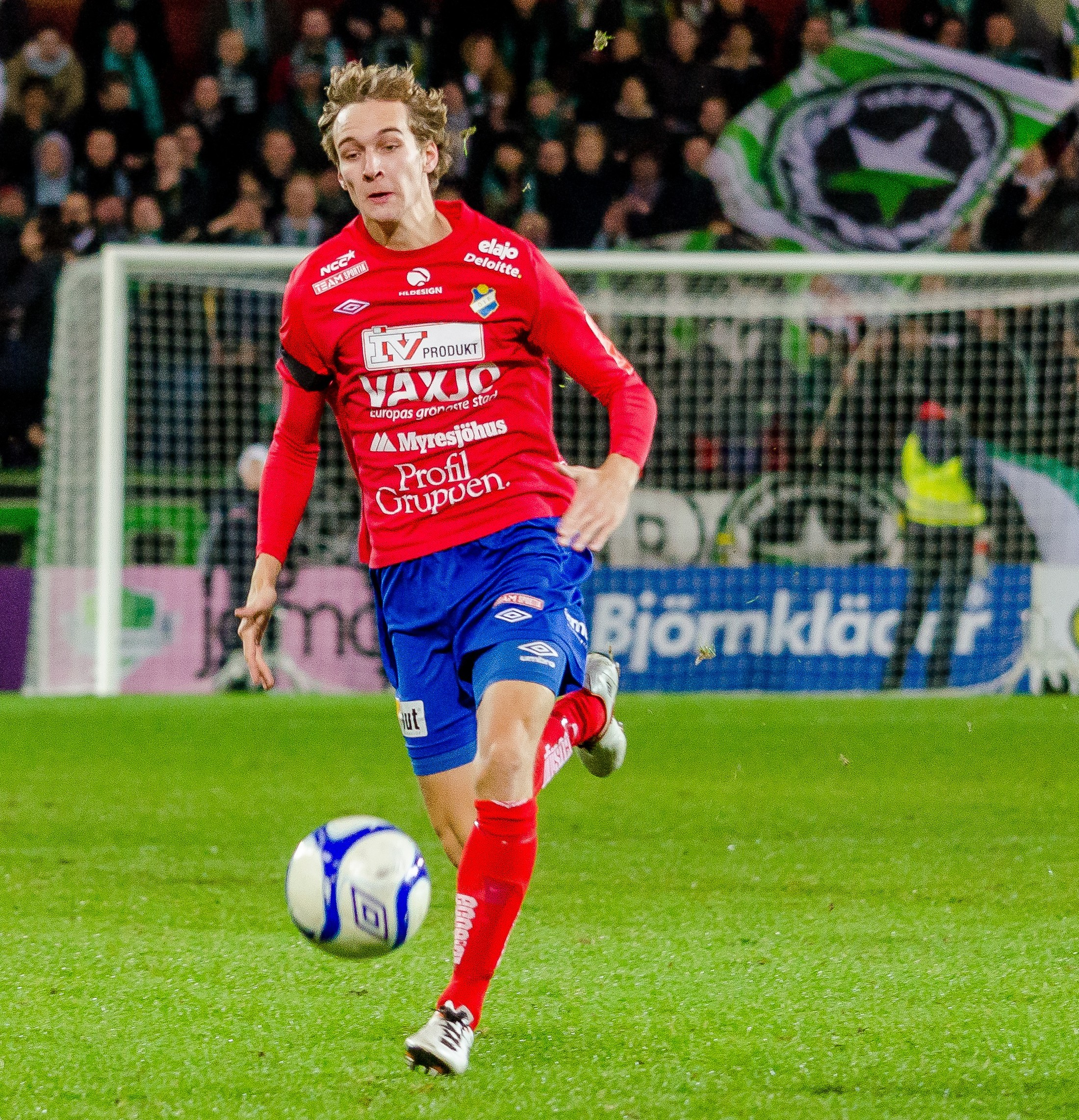

Personal information
- Full name: Alexander Henningsson
- Date of birth: 14 May 1990 (age 36)
- Place of birth: Växjö, Sweden
- Height: 1.85 m (6 ft 1 in)
- Position: Right midfielder

Team information
- Current team: Räppe GoIF
- Number: 14

Youth career
- –2003: Sandsbro AIK
- 2003–2008: Östers IF

Senior career*
Years	Team	Apps	(Gls)
2009–2015	Östers IF	158	(20)
2015–2017	Halmstads BK	40	(4)
2017	Fredrikstad	13	(0)
2018	IFK Värnamo	23	(2)
2019	Norrby IF	16	(1)
2020	Östers IF	19	(0)
2021–	Räppe GoIF	39	(17)
- * Club domestic league appearances and goals as of 19:11, 25 December 2022 (UTC)

Alexander Henningsson (born 14 May 1990) is a Swedish footballer who plays for Räppe GoIF.
