= Johannes Hopf =

Swedish former professional footballer (born 1987)

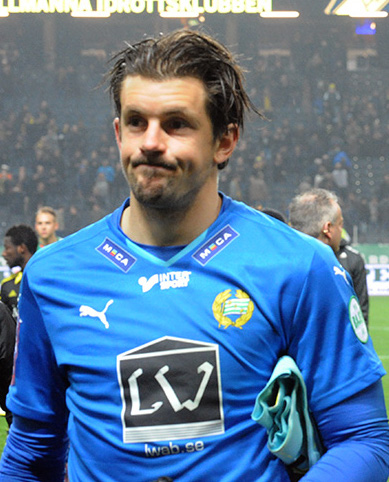
- Hopf playing for Hammarby in 2015

Personal information
- Full name: Per Johannes Hopf
- Date of birth: 16 June 1987 (age 39)
- Place of birth: Räng, Sweden
- Height: 1.95 m (6 ft 5 in)
- Position: Goalkeeper

Youth career
- Brösarps IF
- IFK Simrishamn

Senior career*
Years	Team	Apps	(Gls)
2004–2006	IFK Simrishamn	55	(3)
2007–2008	Ystads IF	31	(0)
2008–2015	Hammarby IF	156	(0)
2009	→ Hammarby TFF (loan)	20	(0)
2015–2018	Gençlerbirliği	94	(0)
2018–2019	Ankaragücü	8	(0)
Total		364	(3)
- * Club domestic league appearances and goals

Per Johannes Hopf (born 16 June 1987) is a Swedish former professional footballer who played as a goalkeeper. He played professionally in Sweden with Hammarby IF as well as in Turkey with Gençlerbirliği S.K. and Ankaragücü.

== Club career ==
=== Hammarby ===
Hopf joined Hammarby in the summer of 2008 after impressing on a trial with the club. He signed a 3 1/2-year contract with the Stockholm-based club. During the 2009 season, he was on loan to the affiliated team Hammarby TFF where he was awarded best goalkeeper in the Swedish fourth tier.

He made his first game for Hammarby in the final game of the 2009 Allsvenskan, against BK Häcken, with the club already set for relegation. Hammarby were defeated, 1–0.

In 2010, he started on the bench, being second choice to former Sweden national team goalkeeper, Rami Shaaban. But after weak appearances by the latter, he soon established himself as first choice.

Hopf was voted Player of the Year in Hammarby IF in 2010 in competition with the Genoa-departed forward Linus Hallenius. He was again voted Player of the year in 2012 after an impressive season.

Among other achievements he won two penalty shootouts for his team to secure Hammarby IF a place in the 2010 Swedish Cup Final. He was appointed Man of the match when his side lost 1–0 to Helsingborg.

=== Gençlerbirliği ===
On 27 May 2015, Hopf signed a three-year deal with the Süper Lig club Gençlerbirliği S.K. He made his debut on 29 August 2015 in a 1–0 win against Kasımpaşa. Hopf was voted Gençlerbirliği's player of the year in both 2016 and 2017.

=== Ankaragücü ===
Hopf signed for Ankaragücü in the summer of 2018. His contract was terminated on 6 March 2019. Hopf made eight official appearances for the club.

=== Retirement ===
Hopf announced his retirement from professional football on 11 May 2020, unable to recover from a serious hip injury.

== International career ==
Hopf was first called up to the Sweden squad in March 2016 for friendlies against Turkey and Czech Republic, but did not play. He was on stand-by for Sweden's 2018 FIFA World Cup squad. He ended his professional career without winning an international cap for Sweden.

== Career statistics ==
Appearances and goals by club, season and competition
Club	Season	League			Cup		Europe		Total	
Club	Season	Division	Apps	Goals	Apps	Goals	Apps	Goals	Apps	Goals
Hammarby	2008	Allsvenskan	0	0	0	0	—		0	0
Hammarby TFF (loan)	2009	Division 2 Östra Svealand	20	0	0	0	—		20	0
Hammarby	2009	Allsvenskan	1	0	0	0	—		1	0
Hammarby	2010	Superettan	26	0	5	0	—		31	0
Hammarby	2011	Superettan	30	0	0	0	—		30	0
Hammarby	2012	Superettan	30	0	1	0	—		31	0
Hammarby	2013	Superettan	29	0	4	0	—		33	0
Hammarby	2014	Superettan	30	0	4	0	—		34	0
Hammarby	2015	Allsvenskan	10	0	0	0	—		10	0
Hammarby	Total		156	0	14	0	0	0	170	0
Gençlerbirliği	2015–16	Süper Lig	29	0	0	0	—		29	0
Gençlerbirliği	2016–17	Süper Lig	32	0	3	0	—		35	0
Gençlerbirliği	2017–18	Süper Lig	33	0	4	0	—		37	0
Gençlerbirliği	Total		94	0	7	0	0	0	101	0
Ankaragücü	2018–19	Süper Lig	8	0	0	0	—		8	0
Career total			253	0	21	0	0	0	279	0

== Honours ==
Hammarby TFF

- Division 2 Östra Svealand: 2010

Hammarby

- Superettan: 2014

Individual

- Gençlerbirliği Player of the Year: 2015–16, 2016–17
- Süper Lig Team of the Season: 2016–17
