= 2016 Hammarby Fotboll season =

Hammarby Fotboll
2016 season
- Chairman: Richard von Yxkull
- Head coach: Nanne Bergstrand
- Stadium: Tele2 Arena
- Allsvenskan: 11th
- 2015–16 Svenska Cupen: Semi finals
- Top goalscorer: League: Erik Israelsson (10); All: Erik Israelsson (12)
- Highest home attendance: 31,756 (4 April vs Östersunds FK, Allsvenskan)
- Lowest home attendance: 7,234 (29 February vs Ljungskile SK, Svenska Cupen)
- Average home league attendance: 22,885

The 2016 season was Hammarby Fotboll's 101st in existence, their 47th season in Allsvenskan and their 2nd consecutive season in the league. They competed in Allsvenskan and Svenska Cupen during the year. League play started in early April and lasted until early November. Nanne Bergstrand made his third season as manager.

== Summary ==
The team had a strong run in the 2015-16 Svenska Cupen. They won against Djurgårdens IF in the group stage, before eliminating their other local rival AIK in the quarter-finals after a penalty shoot-out. Eventually Hammarby lost in the semi-final against BK Häcken, finishing joint third in the tournament.

However, during the first half of the league play Hammarby struggled in their fixtures, only winning 3 of the 15 games. One of the few highlights were the performances of midfielder Erik Israelsson who managed to score 8 goals during the same period.

Mid through the campaign, manager Nanne Bergstrand chose to swap the two central defenders, with youngster Joseph Aidoo and newly signed David Boo Wiklander making their entrances as regular starters. Out of the following 11 games Hammarby won an impressive 7 – also keeping a clean sheet in 6 consecutive away fixtures. Boo Wiklander was later voted player of the year by the club's supporters.

During the end of the season, Hammarby struggled to stay in the new found mid regions of the table, losing 3 out of the 4 last fixtures. Eventually the club, to some disappointingly, finished 11th in Allsvenskan. However, on match day 26, Hammarby managed to beat local rivals Djurgården in a spectacular derby fixture. The Brazilian striker Rômulo scored a hat-trick while securing a 4-2 win for his side.

In the off-season, on 18 November, the board chose to sack manager Nanne Bergstrand, citing "a need to get a new voice and new energy into the club's sporting development".

== Players ==
=== Squad information ===
N	Pos.	Nat.	Name	Age	Since	App	Goals	Ends	Transfer fee	Notes
1	GK	(Iceland)	Ögmundur Kristinsson	27	2015	45	0	2018	Free	
2	DF	(Iceland)	Birkir Már Sævarsson	32	2014	55	3	2017	Undisclosed	
3	DF	(Sweden)	Richard Magyar	25	2015	31	1	2017 (June)	Free	
4	MF	(Sweden)	Erik Israelsson	27	2013	76	20	2018	Free	
5	MF	(Sweden)	Philip Haglund (second vice captain)	29	2014	49	3	2016	Free	
6	DF	(Ghana)	Joseph Aidoo	21	2015	15	1	2018	Undisclosed	
7	FW	(Brazil)	Alex	26	2016	28	5	2016	Undisclosed	
8	MF	(Sweden)	Johan Persson (vice captain)	32	2013	76	4	2018 (June)	Undisclosed	
9	DF	(Sweden)	Stefan Batan	31	2014	55	0	2016	Undisclosed	
10	MF	(Sweden)	Kennedy Bakircioglu (captain)	36	2012	236	77	2016	Free	
11	MF	(Iceland)	Arnór Smárason	28	2015	27	4	2018	Undisclosed	
14	MF	(Norway)	Fredrik Torsteinbø	25	2014	65	10	2018	Free	
16	FW	(Brazil)	Rômulo	25	2016	26	5	2017	Undisclosed	
17	FW	(The Gambia)	Pa Dibba	29	2016	10	2	2019 (June)	Undisclosed	
18	DF	(Sweden)	Oliver Silverholt	22	2014	16	0	2017	Free	
22	DF	(Costa Rica)	Ian Smith	18	2016	0	0	2016	Loan	On loan from Santos de Guápiles
23	DF	(Norway)	Lars Sætra	25	2014	62	3	2018	Free	
24	GK	(Sweden)	William Eskelinen	20	2015	0	0	2016	Undisclosed	On loan to Enskede IK
25	GK	(Sweden)	Tim Markström	30	2012	5	0	2017	Free	
26	MF	(Sweden)	Dušan Jajić	18	2015	5	0	2017	Undisclosed	On loan to Enskede IK
27	FW	(Sweden)	Isac Lidberg	18	2015	7	0	2017	Youth system	On loan to Enskede IK
34	MF	(Sweden)	Leo Bengtsson	18	2016	0	0	2019 (June)	Youth system	
55	FW	(Sweden)	Imad Khalili	39	2015	29	1	2019	Free	
66	DF	(Sweden)	David Boo Wiklander	32	2016	13	0	2016	Free	
77	DF	(Norway)	Mats Solheim	29	2015	42	4	2017	Undisclosed	
	MF	(Sweden)	Petter Andersson	31	2016	103	21	2018	Free	

- Last updated: 21 November 2016
- Source: Hammarby Fotboll and players' Wikipedia articles
- Ordered by squad number.

=== Transfers ===
==== In ====
No.	Pos.	Nat.	Name	Age	Moving from	Type	Transfer window	Ends	Transfer fee	Source
6	DF	(Ghana)	Joseph Aidoo	20	Inter Allies (Ghana)	Transfer	Winter	2018	Undisclosed	expressen.se
11	MF	(Iceland)	Arnór Smárason	27	Helsingborgs IF	Transfer	Winter	2018	Undisclosed	aftonbladet.se
21	MF	(Sweden)	Melker Hallberg	20	Udinese (Italy)	Loan	Winter	2016 (June)	Undisclosed	aftonbladet.se
7	FW	(Brazil)	Alex	25	Army United (Thailand)	Bosman	Winter	2016	Free	fotbollskanalen.se
16	FW	(Brazil)	Rômulo	24	Friburguense (Brazil)	Transfer	Winter	2017	Undisclosed	fotbollskanalen.se
66	DF	(Sweden)	David Boo Wiklander	31	IFK Norrköping	Bosman	Winter	2016	Free	hammarbyfotboll.se
22	DF	(Costa Rica)	Ian Smith	18	Santos de Guápiles (Costa Rica)	Loan	Summer	2016	Undisclosed	hammarbyfotboll.se
	MF	(Sweden)	Petter Andersson	31	Midtjylland (Denmark)	Bosman	Summer	2018	Free	hammarbyfotboll.se
17	FW	(The Gambia)	Pa Dibba	28	GIF Sundsvall	Transfer	Summer	2019 (June)	Undisclosed	hammarbyfotboll.se
34	MF	(Sweden)	Leo Bengtsson	18	Youth system	Promoted	Summer	2019 (June)	–	hammarbyfotboll.se

==== Out ====
No.	Pos.	Nat.	Name	Age	Moving to	Type	Transfer window	Transfer fee	Source
21	MF	(Norway)	Jan Gunnar Solli	34	Retirement	End of contract	Winter	Free	fotbolltransfers.com
26	MF	(Sweden)	Viktor Nordin	19	Sandvikens IF	End of contract	Winter	Free	fotbolltransfers.se
11	FW	(Sweden)	Pablo Piñones Arce	34	IF Brommapojkarna	End of contract	Winter	Free	brommapojkarna.se
17	FW	(Sweden)	Linus Hallenius	26	Helsingborgs IF	Transfer	Winter	Undisclosed	hif.se
22	MF	(Norway)	Lars Fuhre	26	Mjøndalen (Norway)	Transfer	Winter	Undisclosed	dt.no
21	MF	(Sweden)	Melker Hallberg	20	Udinese (Italy)	Loan return	Summer	—	hammarbyfotboll.se
34	FW	(Sweden)	Måns Söderqvist	23	Kalmar FF	Transfer	Summer	Undisclosed	hammarbyfotboll.se
20	MF	(Liberia)	Amadaiya Rennie	26	Antalyaspor (Turkey)	Transfer	Summer	Free	hammarbyfotboll.se

== Player statistics ==
=== Appearances and goals ===
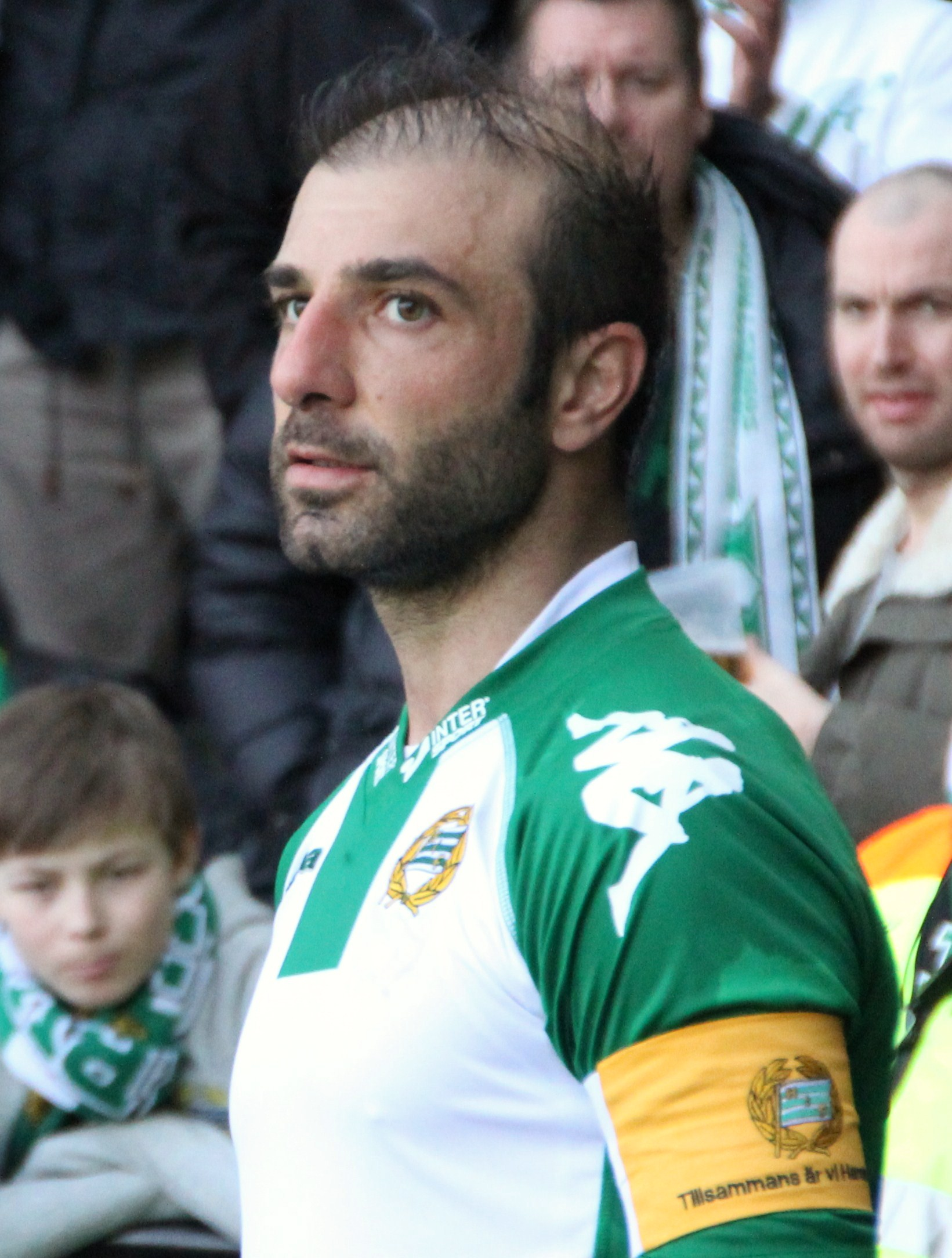
Kennedy Bakircioglu was Hammarby's captain during the season.

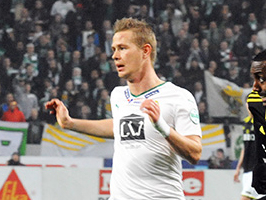
Erik Israelsson was the top scorer of the 2016 season.

As of 21 November 2016

Number	Position	Name	2016 Allsvenskan		2015–16 Svenska Cupen 2016–17 Svenska Cupen		Total	
Number	Position	Name	Appearances	Goals	Appearances	Goals	Appearances	Goals
1	GK	Ögmundur Kristinsson	30	0	5	0	35	0
2	DF	Birkir Már Sævarsson	27	1	6	0	33	1
3	DF	Richard Magyar	20	1	5	0	25	1
4	MF	Erik Israelsson	29	10	5	2	34	12
5	MF	Philip Haglund	23	3	4	1	27	4
6	DF	Joseph Aidoo	14	1	0	0	14	1
7	FW	Alex	28	5	4	3	32	8
8	MF	Johan Persson	23	1	4	1	27	2
9	DF	Stefan Batan	9	0	6	0	15	0
10	MF	Kennedy Bakircioglu	27	6	5	1	32	7
11	MF	Arnór Smárason	27	4	5	1	32	5
14	MF	Fredrik Torsteinbø	22	0	5	0	27	0
16	FW	Rômulo	26	5	1	0	27	5
17	FW	Pa Dibba	10	2	1	1	11	3
18	DF	Oliver Silverholt	1	0	3	0	4	0
22	DF	Ian Smith	0	0	0	0	0	0
23	DF	Lars Sætra	19	1	6	0	25	1
24	GK	William Eskelinen	0	0	0	0	0	0
25	GK	Tim Markström	0	0	1	0	1	0
26	MF	Dušan Jajić	3	0	0	0	3	0
27	FW	Isac Lidberg	5	0	0	0	5	0
34	MF	Leo Bengtsson	0	0	0	0	0	0
55	FW	Imad Khalili	17	1	6	1	23	2
66	DF	David Boo Wiklander	13	0	1	0	14	0
77	DF	Mats Solheim	16	2	1	0	17	2
	MF	Petter Andersson	0	0	0	0	0	0
Players that left the club during the season
20	MF	Amadaiya Rennie	2	0	2	0	4	0
21	MF	Melker Hallberg	12	0	4	1	16	1
34	FW	Måns Söderqvist	7	1	3	0	10	1

=== Disciplinary record ===
N	P	Nat.	Name	Allsvenskan			Svenska Cupen			Total			Notes
N	P	Nat.	Name	Yellow card	Second yellow card	Red card	Yellow card	Second yellow card	Red card	Yellow card	Second yellow card	Red card	Notes
2	DF	(Sweden)	Birkir Már Sævarsson	3						3			
3	DF	(Sweden)	Richard Magyar	4						4			
4	MF	(Sweden)	Erik Israelsson	5			2			7			
5	MF	(Sweden)	Philip Haglund	4			2			6			
6	DF	(Ghana)	Joseph Aidoo	2						2			
7	FW	(Brazil)	Alex	6			1			7			
8	MF	(Sweden)	Johan Persson	7		1	2			9		1	
9	DF	(Sweden)	Stefan Batan	2			1			3			
10	MF	(Sweden)	Kennedy Bakircioglu	2						2			
11	MF	(Iceland)	Arnór Smárason	7			1			8			
14	MF	(Norway)	Fredrik Torsteinbø	1						1			
16	FW	(Brazil)	Rômulo	1						1			
17	FW	(The Gambia)	Pa Dibba	1						1			
18	DF	(Sweden)	Oliver Silverholt	1						1			
21	MF	(Sweden)	Melker Hallberg	2					1	2		1	
23	DF	(Norway)	Lars Sætra	4		1	1			5		1	
66	DF	(Sweden)	David Boo Wiklander	3						3			
77	DF	(Norway)	Mats Solheim	2						2			

Last updated: 21 November 2016
Source: hammarbyfotboll.se
Only competitive matches
(yellow card) = Number of bookings; (second yellow card) = Number of sending offs after a second yellow card; (red card) = Number of sending offs by a direct red card.

== Club ==
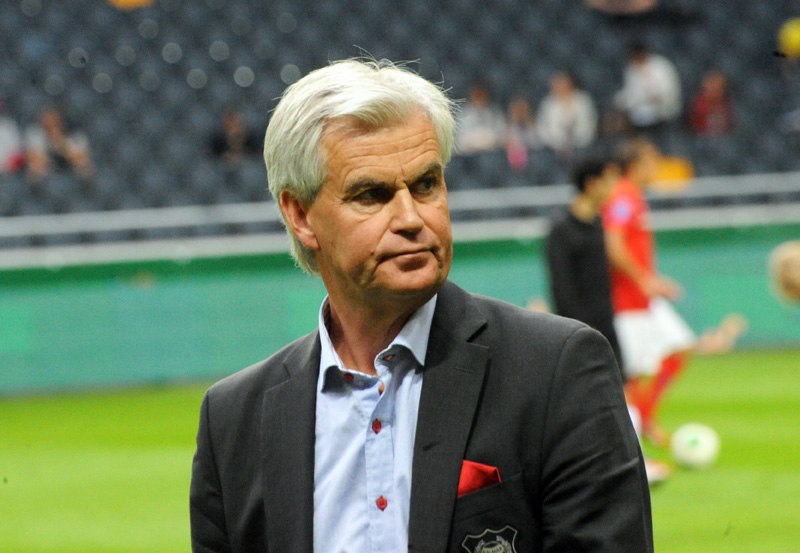
The 2016 season was Nanne Bergstrand's third season with Hammarby Fotboll.

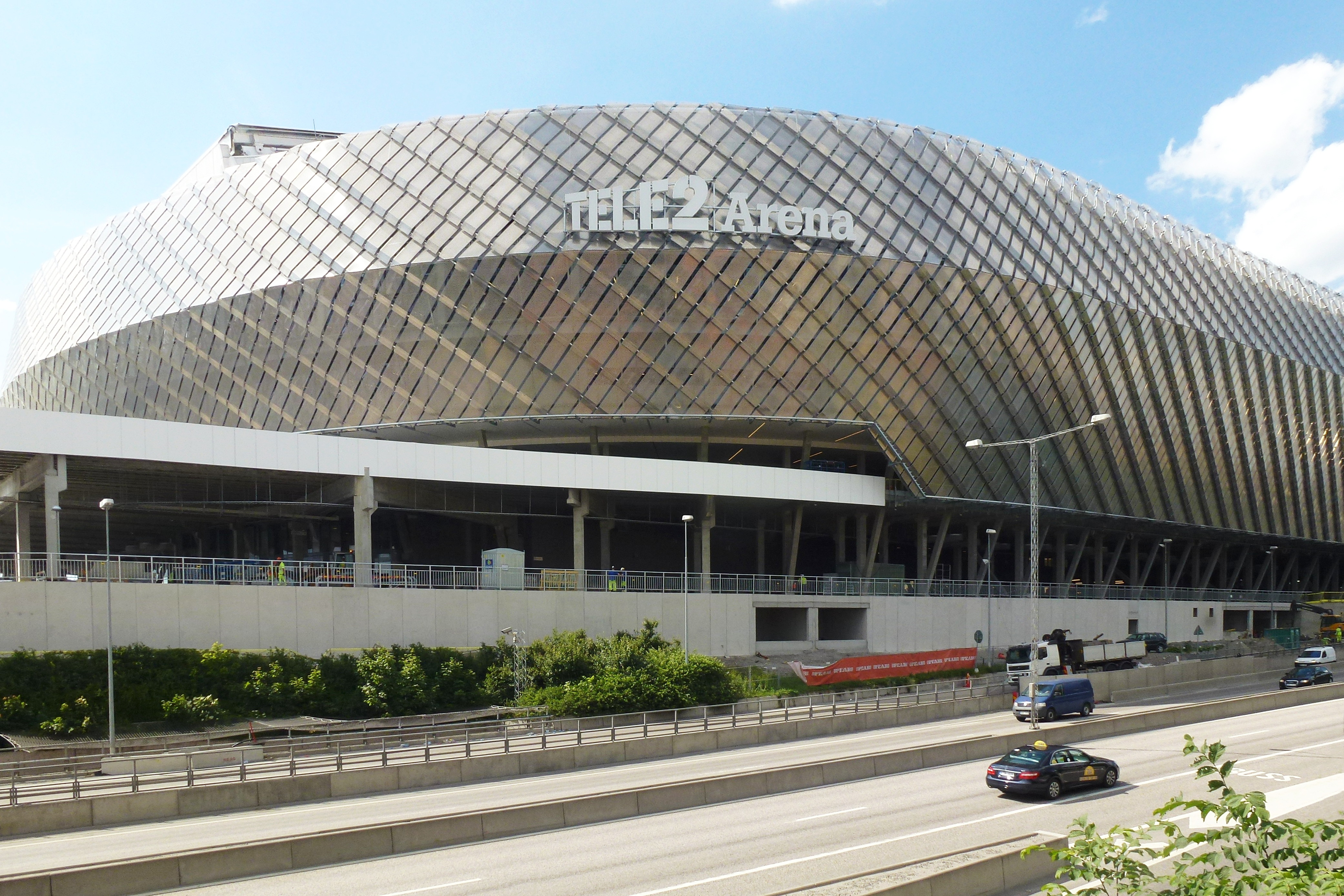
Tele2 Arena was the second largest stadium in Allsvenskan.

=== Coaching staff ===
Position	Staff
Manager	(Sweden) Nanne Bergstrand
Assistant manager	(Sweden) Pablo Piñones-Arce
First team coach	(Sweden) Patrik Hansson
First team coach and head of scouting	(Sweden) Mikael Hjelmberg
Goalkeeping coach	(Sweden) Mikael "Mille" Olsson
Fitness coach	(Sweden) Claes Hellgren
Mental coach	(Sweden) Anders Friberg
Physician	(Sweden) Mikael Klotz
Equipment manager	(Sweden) Anders Bitén
U19 head coach	(Sweden) Andreas Brännström
U19 assistant coach	(Sweden) Isak Dahlin
U19 goalkeeping coach	(Sweden) Gustav Scheutz
Head coach youth academy	(Sweden) Stefan Billborn

=== Other information ===
Chairman	(Sweden) Richard von Yxkull
General Manager	(Sweden) Mats Jingblad
Ground (capacity and dimensions)	Tele2 Arena (33,000 / )

== Pre-season and friendlies ==
=== Friendlies ===
24 January 2016 Friendly	Hammarby IF (Sweden)	2–0	(Finland) Kuopion Palloseura	Tyresö, Sweden
13:00 CET (UTC+01)	Smárason (yellow card) 54'; Magyar 71'; Sævarsson 89'	Report		Stadium: Tyresövallen; Attendance: 2450; Referee: Glenn Nyberg (Sweden)

31 January 2016 Friendly	Hammarby IF	0–2	Östersund	Salou, Spain
15:30 CET (UTC+1)	Magyar (yellow card) 72'	Report	Nouri (yellow card) 37'; Dyer 49'; Ghoddos 59'	Stadium: CE Futbol Salou; Attendance: 300

3 February 2016 Friendly	Hammarby IF	4–1	Halmstad BK	Salou, Spain
15:30 CET (UTC+1)	Rennie 31'; Söderqvist 37'; Söderqvist 39'; Hallberg (yellow card) 54'; Israelsson 77'	Report	Ruud Tveter 7' (pen.)	Stadium: CE Futbol Salou; Attendance: 80

6 February 2016 Friendly	Hammarby IF	0–3	Helsingborgs IF	Salou, Spain
16:00 CET (UTC+1)		Report	Bojanic (yellow card) 22'; Larsson 45'; Eriksson 65'; Rusike 82'	Stadium: CE Futbol Salou; Attendance: 100

13 February 2016 Friendly	Hammarby IF (Sweden)	2–1	(Norway) Tromsø IL	Tyresö, Sweden
13:00 CET (UTC+01)	Israelsson 58'; Magyar (yellow card) 66'; Haglund (yellow card) 70'; Haglund 78'; Bakircioglu (yellow card) 88'	report	Lehne Olsen 1'	Stadium: Tyresövallen; Attendance: 2117; Referee: Johan Hamlin (Sweden)

25 March 2016 Friendly	Hammarby IF (Sweden)	2–1	(Iran) Esteghlal F.C.	Stockholm, Sweden
15:00 CET (UTC+01)	Israelsson (yellow card) 38'; Jajić (yellow card) 50'; Jajić 63'; Lidberg 68'; Alex (yellow card) 93'	report	Majidi 2' (pen.)	Stadium: Tele2 Arena; Attendance: 7127; Referee: Stefan Johannesson (Sweden)

28 March 2016 Friendly	Örebro SK	2–1	Hammarby IF	Örebro, Sweden
15:00 CET (UTC+01)	Kamara 2'; Holmberg 82'	report	Sætra (yellow card) 20'; Torsteinbø 65'	Stadium: Behrn Arena; Attendance: 3893; Referee: Martin Strömbergsson (Sweden)

22 June 2016 Friendly	Hammarby IF	1–2	(Estonia) Levadia Tallinn	Tyresö, Sweden
16:00 CET (UTC+01)	Israelsson 46'; Persson (yellow card) 91'	report	Miranchuk 42'; Hunt 45'; Gatagov (red card) 91'	Stadium: Tyresövallen; Attendance: 781

29 June 2016 Friendly	Hammarby IF	4–1	(Norway) Aalesunds FK	Södertälje, Sweden
13:00 CET (UTC+01)	Smárason 30'; Alex (yellow card) 32'; Bakircioglu 35'; Smárason 58' (pen.); Israelsson 61'	report	Skagestad (red card) 57'; Þrándarson 73'	Stadium: Södertälje Fotbollsarena; Attendance: 351; Referee: Johan Krantz (Sweden)

== Competitions ==
=== Overall ===
Competition	Started round	Current position / round	Final position / round	First match	Last match
Allsvenskan	—	—	11	4 April 2016	6 November 2016
2015–16 Svenska Cupen	Round 2	—	Semi final	20 August 2015	20 March 2016

Updated to match played 10 April 2016
Source: Competitions

=== Allsvenskan ===
==== League table ====
Pos	Team	Pld	W	D	L	GF	GA	GD	Pts
9	Örebro SK	30	11	8	11	48	51	−3	41
10	BK Häcken	30	11	7	12	58	45	+13	40
11	Hammarby IF	30	10	9	11	46	49	−3	39
12	Jönköpings Södra IF	30	8	11	11	32	39	−7	35
13	GIF Sundsvall	30	7	9	14	38	54	−16	30

Source: svenskfotboll.se (in Swedish)
Rules for classification: 1) Points; 2) Goal difference; 3) Goals scored; 4) Head-to-head points; 5) Head-to-head goal difference; 6) Head-to-head away goals scored; 7) Play-off
(Note: Play-off is only played if need to decide champion, teams for relegation or UEFA competition and will be played on a neutral ground).

==== Results summary ====
Overall								Home						Away					
Pld	W	D	L	GF	GA	GD	Pts	W	D	L	GF	GA	GD	W	D	L	GF	GA	GD
30	10	9	11	46	49	−3	39	5	6	4	29	26	+3	5	3	7	17	23	−6

Source: svenskfotboll.se (in Swedish)

==== Results by round ====
Round	1	2	3	4	5	6	7	8	9	10	11	12	13	14	15	16	17	18	19	20	21	22	23	24	25	26	27	28	29	30
Ground	H	A	H	A	H	A	H	A	A	H	A	H	A	H	H	A	H	A	H	A	H	A	H	A	A	H	H	A	H	A
Result	D	L	W	W	D	L	D	L	D	L	L	W	L	D	L	W	W	D	W	D	D	W	L	W	W	W	L	L	D	L
Position	11	14	7	5	7	8	10	12	12	14	14	14	14	14	14	13	12	12	10	9	9	9	10	9	9	8	8	9	8	11

Source: see below
A = Away; H = Home; W = Win; D = Draw; L = Loss

==== Matches ====
Kickoff times are in (UTC+01) unless stated otherwise.

4 April 2016 Round 1	Hammarby IF	1–1	Östersunds FK	Stockholm
19:00	Stefan Batan (yellow card) 11'; Sætra 14'; Hallberg (yellow card) 16'; Alex (yellow card) 58'; Rômulo (yellow card) 74'	Report	Ghoddos 35'; Papagiannopoulos (yellow card) 42'; Somi (yellow card) 56'; Dyer (yellow card) 62'	Stadium: Tele2 Arena; Attendance: 31756; Referee: Bojan Pandzic (Sweden)

7 April 2016 Round 2	IF Elfsborg	4–1	Hammarby IF	Borås
19:00	Prodell 6'; Claesson 47' (pen.); Magyar 68' (o.g.); Rohdén 74' (pen.)	Report	Sætra (yellow card) 32'; Smárason (yellow card) 46'; Smárason 57' (pen.)	Stadium: Borås Arena; Attendance: 8869; Referee: Mohammed Al-Hakim (Sweden)

10 April 2016 Round 3	Hammarby IF	5–1	Helsingborgs IF	Stockholm
19:00	Israelsson 6'; Israelsson 20'; Alex 52'; Persson (yellow card) 62'; Söderqvist 81'; Israelsson 83'	Report	Johansson 4'; Helstrup (yellow card) 83'	Stadium: Tele2 Arena; Attendance: 20516; Referee: Glenn Nyberg (Sweden)

19 April 2016 Round 4	Djurgårdens IF	1–3	Hammarby IF	Stockholm
19:00	Johnson 25'; Ranégie (yellow card) 92'	Report	Alex 12'; Alex 41'; Israelsson 62'; Haglund (yellow card) 76'	Stadium: Tele2 Arena; Attendance: 24900; Referee: Andreas Ekberg (Sweden)

23 April 2016 Round 5	Hammarby IF	1–1	Jönköpings Södra IF	Stockholm
16:00	Smárason (yellow card) 16'; Hallberg (yellow card) 22'; Magyar (yellow card) 26'; Persson (yellow card) 85'; Calisir 94' (o.g.)	Report	Gojani (yellow card) 40'; Smylie (yellow card) 43'; Thelin 62'; Feindrich (yellow card) 81'	Stadium: Tele2 Arena; Attendance: 24131; Referee: Martin Strömbergsson (Sweden)

26 April 2016 Round 6	IFK Norrköping	3–1	Hammarby IF	Norrköping
18:30	Wahlqvist 20'; Blomqvist 54'; Blomqvist (yellow card) 62'; Traustason 98' (pen.)	Report	Israelsson 42'; Persson (yellow card) 47'; Alex (yellow card) 59'; Torsteinbø (yellow card) 68'; Sætra (red card) 98'	Stadium: Östgötaporten; Attendance: 15030; Referee: Kaspar Sjöberg (Sweden)

1 May 2016 Round 7	Hammarby IF	1–1	GIF Sundsvall	Stockholm
17:30	Haglund 52'	Report	Dibba (yellow card) 27'; Sonko Sundberg (yellow card) 37'; Sigurjónsson 58'	Stadium: Tele2 Arena; Attendance: 23 877; Referee: Stefan Johannesson (Sweden)

9 May 2016 Round 8	Örebro SK	3–2	Hammarby IF	Örebro
19:00	Nordmark 18'; Almebäck (yellow card) 24'; Ajdarevic 45' (pen.); Hines-Ike 69'; Kamara (yellow card) 74'; Björnquist (yellow card) 95'	Report	Alex 11'; Almebäck 34' (o.g.); Haglund (yellow card) 44'; Israelsson (yellow card) 92'; Magyar (yellow card) 96'	Stadium: Behrn Arena; Attendance: 10362; Referee: Jonas Eriksson (Sweden)

14 May 2016 Round 9	Kalmar FF	1–1	Hammarby IF	Kalmar
16:00	Elm (yellow card) 13'; Antonsson 41'; Biskupović (yellow card) 53'	Report	Haglund (yellow card) 59'; Israelsson 65'; Magyar (yellow card) 68'	Stadium: Guldfågeln Arena; Attendance: 10189; Referee: Kaspar Sjöberg (Sweden)

18 May 2016 Round 10	Hammarby IF	2–3	Malmö FF	Stockholm
18:30	Rômulo 3'; Israelsson 75'; Boo Wiklander (yellow card) 77'	Report	Kjartansson 10'; Christiansen 43'; Wolff Eikrem 73'; Wolff Eikrem (yellow card) 92'	Stadium: Tele2 Arena; Attendance: 23617; Referee: Mohammed Al-Hakim (Sweden)

23 May 2016 Round 11	IFK Göteborg	2–1	Hammarby IF	Gothenburg
19:00	Smedberg Dalence 7'; Smedberg Dalence (yellow card) 47'; Hermannsson (yellow card) 49'; Boman 67'	Report	Sævarsson 87'	Stadium: Gamla Ullevi; Attendance: 13209; Referee: Stefan Johannesson (Sweden)

29 May 2016 Round 12	Hammarby IF	2–1	Gefle IF	Stockholm
15:00	Israelsson 13'; Sætra (yellow card) 36'; Alex 39'; Persson (red card) 91'	Report	Bertilsson 89'	Stadium: Tele2 Arena; Attendance: 22215; Referee: Glenn Nyberg (Sweden)

9 July 2016 Round 13	BK Häcken	4–2	Hammarby IF	Gothenburg
16:00	Schüller (yellow card) 13'; Ericsson 18'; Abrahamsson (yellow card) 34'; Owoeri 37'; Paulinho (yellow card) 42'; Arkivuo (yellow card) 50'; Owoeri 63'; Sandberg (yellow card) 86'; Savage (yellow card) 90'; Savage 93'	Report	Alex (yellow card) 33'; Smárason 34' (pen.); Sævarsson (yellow card) 55'; Bakircioglu 86' (pen.); Bakircioglu (yellow card) 90'	Stadium: Bravida Arena; Attendance: 4518; Referee: Kristoffer Karlsson (Sweden)

17 July 2016 Round 14	Hammarby IF	3–3	Falkenbergs FF	Stockholm
17:30	Silverholt (yellow card) 22'; Bakircioglu 45'; Khalili 48'; Magyar 62'	Report	Juel-Nielsen (yellow card) 1'; Karlsson 16'; Sjöstedt 28'; Karlsson 34'; Araba (yellow card) 36'; Vall (yellow card) 49'	Stadium: Tele2 Arena; Attendance: 18119; Referee: Andreas Ekberg (Sweden)

24 July 2016 Round 15	Hammarby IF	0–3	AIK	Stockholm
15:00	Magyar (yellow card) 48'; Haglund (yellow card) 83'	Report	Hauksson 11'; Markkanen 17'; Ofori 38'; Johansson (yellow card) 61'	Stadium: Tele2 Arena; Attendance: 26618; Referee: Mohammed Al-Hakim (Sweden)

30 July 2016 Round 16	Gefle IF	0–2	Hammarby IF	Gävle
16:00	Oremo (yellow card) 22'; Andersson (yellow card) 33'; Portin (yellow card) 64'	Report	Haglund 12'; Bakircioglu 33' (pen.)	Stadium: Gavlevallen; Attendance: 5884; Referee: Stefan Johannesson

7 August 2016 Round 17	Hammarby IF	2–1	Kalmar FF	Stockholm
15:30	Bakircioglu 27' (pen.); Persson 59'; Solheim (yellow card) 67'	Report	Ring (yellow card) 27'; Romário 49'; Ismael (yellow card) 82'	Stadium: Tele2 Arena; Attendance: 18134; Referee: Glenn Nyberg (Sweden)

15 August 2016 Round 18	GIF Sundsvall	0–0	Hammarby IF	Sundsvall
19:00		Report	Persson (yellow card) 18'; Dibba (yellow card) 46'; Smárason (yellow card) 82'	Stadium: Norrporten Arena; Attendance: 6048; Referee: Kristoffer Karlsson (Sweden)

21 August 2016 Round 19	Hammarby IF	2–0	IFK Göteborg	Stockholm
15:00	Haglund 20'; Alex (yellow card) 30'; Boo Wiklander (yellow card) 43'; Bakircioglu 91'	Report	Eriksson (yellow card) 68'; Jamieson (yellow card) 90'	Stadium: Tele2 Arena; Attendance: 21848; Referee: Johan Hamlin (Sweden)

28 August 2016 Round 20	AIK	0–0	Hammarby IF	Solna
15:00	Ishizaki (yellow card) 34'; Ofori (yellow card) 50'; Johansson (yellow card) 91'; Isak (yellow card) 92'	Report	Smárason (yellow card) 25'; Persson (yellow card) 25'; Israelsson (yellow card) 71'; Aidoo (yellow card) 92'	Stadium: Friends Arena; Attendance: 30843; Referee: Stefan Johannesson (Sweden)

11 September 2016 Round 21	Hammarby IF	1–1	Örebro SK	Stockholm
19:00	Sævarsson (yellow card) 13'; Aidoo 69'; Aidoo (yellow card) 97'	Report	Åhman Persson (yellow card) 68'; Gerzić (yellow card) 80'; Besara 94'; Broberg (yellow card) 97'	Stadium: Tele2 Arena; Attendance: 23212; Referee: Magnus Lindgren (Sweden)

18 September 2016 Round 22	Jönköpings Södra IF	0–1	Hammarby IF	Jönköping
19:00	Smylie (yellow card) 27'; Fendrich (yellow card) 83'; Thelin (yellow card) 92'	Report	Bakircioglu (yellow card) 31'; Boo Wiklander (yellow card) 43'; Bakircioglu 75'	Stadium: Stadsparksvallen; Attendance: 6247; Referee: Mohammed Al-Hakim (Sweden)

22 September 2016 Round 23	Hammarby IF	2–3	BK Häcken	Stockholm
19:00	Alex (yellow card) 57'; Israelsson 64'; Smárason (yellow card) 66'; Solheim 75'; Persson (yellow card) 78'	Report	Kamara 20'; Arkivuo (yellow card) 33'; Farnerud (yellow card) 48'; Mensah (yellow card) 72'; Abubakari 80'; Farnerud 86'	Stadium: Tele2 Arena; Attendance: 19111; Referee: Robert Daradic (Sweden)

26 September 2016 Round 24	Falkenbergs FF	0–2	Hammarby IF	Falkenberg
19:00	Juel-Nielsen (yellow card) 7'; Rodevåg (yellow card) 30'; Carvalho (yellow card) 60'	Report	Israelsson 25'; Dibba 56'; Israelsson (yellow card) 92'	Stadium: Falkenbergs IP; Attendance: 2380; Referee: Kristoffer Karlsson (Sweden)

30 September 2016 Round 25	Helsingborgs IF	0–1	Hammarby IF	Helsingborg
19:00		Report	Rômulo 83'	Stadium: Olympia; Attendance: 7612; Referee: Mohammed Al-Hakim (Sweden)

17 October 2016 Round 26	Hammarby IF	4–2	Djurgårdens IF	Stockholm
19:00	Rômulo 34'; Sævarsson (yellow card) 38'; Persson (yellow card) 39'; Smárason 41'; Rômulo 54'; Sætra (yellow card) 70'; Rômulo 76'; Smárason (yellow card) 82'; Solheim (yellow card) 89'	Report	Walker 3'; Ranégie 32'; Ranégie (yellow card) 65'; Ceesay (yellow card) 86'	Stadium: Tele2 Arena; Attendance: 28493; Referee: Andreas Ekberg (Sweden)

23 October 2016 Round 27	Hammarby IF	2–4	IF Elfsborg	Stockholm
17:30	Alex (yellow card) 28'; Dibba 51'; Solheim 62'; Israelsson (yellow card) 77'	Report	Claesson 5'; Frick 17'; Lundevall 26'; Lundevall (yellow card) 54'; Frick (yellow card) 54'; Nilsson (yellow card) 92'; Jebali 92'	Stadium: Tele2 Arena; Attendance: 21299; Referee: Martin Strömbergsson (Sweden)

26 October 2016 Round 28	Östersunds FK	2–0	Hammarby IF	Östersund
19:00	Gero 73'; Edwards 93'	Report	Israelsson (yellow card) 81'	Stadium: Jämtkraft Arena; Attendance: 6644; Referee: Bojan Pandzic (Sweden)

30 October 2016 Round 29	Hammarby IF	1–1	IFK Norrköping	Stockholm
15:00	Smárason 45'; Batan (yellow card) 80'	Report	Holmberg 78'	Stadium: Tele2 Arena; Attendance: 20335; Referee: Kristoffer Karlsson (Sweden)

6 November 2016 Round 30	Malmö FF	3-0	Hammarby IF	Malmö
15:00	Berget 33'; Lewicki (yellow card) 45'; Rosenberg 86'; Rosenberg 86'	Report	Smárason (yellow card) 29'; Sætra (yellow card) 33'	Stadium: Swedbank Stadion; Attendance: 21719; Referee: Stefan Johannesson (Sweden)

=== Svenska Cupen ===
==== 2015–16 ====
The tournament continues from the 2015 season.

Kickoff times are in UTC+1.

===== Group stage =====
Pos	Team	Pld	W	D	L	GF	GA	GD	Pts	Qualification	HAM	SFC	DIF	LSK
1	Hammarby IF	3	2	1	0	7	3	+4	7	Advance to Knockout stage	—	0–0	—	4–2
2	Syrianska FC	3	2	1	0	2	0	+2	7		—	—	1–0	—
3	Djurgårdens IF	3	1	0	2	3	5	−2	3		1–3	—	—	2–1
4	Ljungskile SK	3	0	0	3	3	7	−4	0		—	0–1	—	—

Source: Swedish Football Association
Rules for classification: 1) Points; 2) Goal difference; 3) Goals scored; 4) Head-to-head record; 5) Highest ranked team

21 February 2016 Matchday 1	Hammarby IF	0–0	Syrianska FC	Stockholm
15:00	Sætra (yellow card) 57'	Report	Nwosu (yellow card) 23'	Stadium: Tele2 Arena; Attendance: 9166; Referee: Diako Behnam (Sweden)

29 February 2016 Matchday 2	Hammarby IF	4–2	Ljungskile SK	Stockholm
19:00	Israelsson 45'; Hallberg (red card) 67'; Bakircioglu 72' (pen.); Alex 82'; Israelsson (yellow card) 87'; Khalili 90'	Report	Olsson 2'; Nilsen 3'; Olsson (yellow card) 40'; Kitić (yellow card) 65'	Stadium: Tele2 Arena; Attendance: 7243; Referee: Martin Strömbergsson (Sweden)

6 March 2016 Matchday 3	Djurgårdens IF	1–3	Hammarby IF	Stockholm
14:00	Andersson 4'; Käck (yellow card) 42'; Colley (yellow card) 76'	Report	Alex 20'; Persson 26'; Magyar (yellow card) 35'; Torsteinbø (yellow card) 39'; Khalili (yellow card) 58'; Haglund (yellow card) 74'; Persson (yellow card) 76'; Haglund 77'; Sætra (yellow card) 78'	Stadium: Tele2 Arena; Attendance: 21367; Referee: Bojan Pandžić (Sweden)

===== Knockout stage =====
15 March 2016 Quarter-finals	AIK	1–1 (a.e.t.) (2–4 p)	Hammarby IF	Solna
18:30	Salétros (yellow card) 18'; Yasin (yellow card) 51'; Hooiveld 61'; Markkanen (yellow card) 64'; Hauksson (yellow card) 102'	Report	Smárason 45'; Smárason (yellow card) 60'; Alex (yellow card) 79'; Haglund (yellow card) 82'	Stadium: Friends Arena; Attendance: 23860; Referee: Mohammed Al-Hakim (Sweden)
	Penalties
	Yasin (penalty scored); Hooiveld (penalty missed); Johansson (penalty scored); Markkanen (penalty missed)		Haglund (penalty missed); Smárason (penalty scored); Khalili (penalty scored); Alex (penalty scored); Kristinsson (penalty scored)

20 March 2016 Semi-finals	Hammarby IF	2–3	BK Häcken	Stockholm
19:00	Alex 2'; Batan (yellow card) 8'; Haglund (yellow card) 82'; Hallberg 85'	Report	Mohammed (yellow card) 4'; Paulinho 58'; Paulinho (yellow card) 58'; Paulinho 67'; Mohammed 89'; Makondele (yellow card) 90'	Stadium: Tele2 Arena; Attendance: 13 788; Referee: Johan Hamlin (Sweden)

==== 2016–17 ====
The tournament continues into the 2017 season.

===== Qualification stage =====
24 August 2016 Round 2	Gamla Upsala SK	1–2	Hammarby IF	Uppsala
19:30	Karim (yellow card) 8'; Källsten 44'; Mellberg (yellow card) 76'; Lindström (yellow card) 77'	Report	Persson (yellow card) 28'; Israelsson 56'; Dibba 76'	Stadium: Studenternas IP; Attendance: 3196; Referee: Johan Krantz (Sweden)
