= Imad Khalili =

Swedish footballer (born 1987)

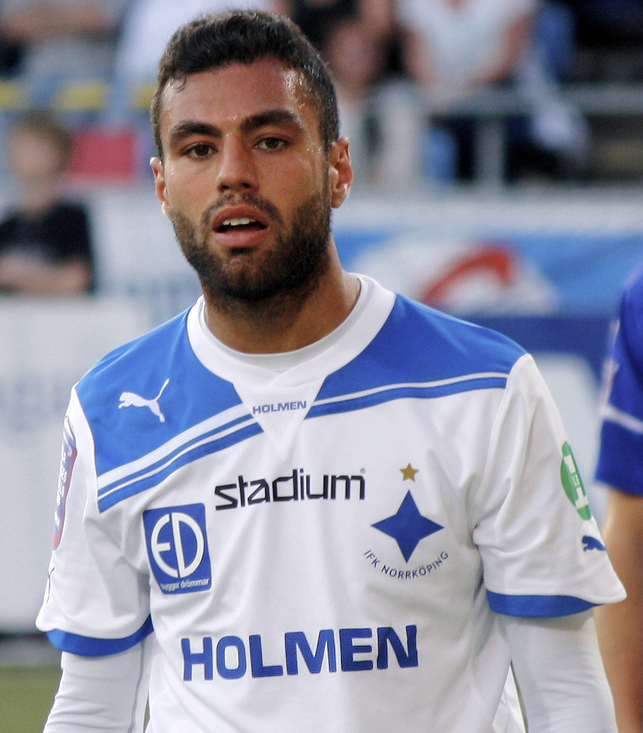
- Khalili playing for IFK Norrköping in 2012

Personal information
- Date of birth: 3 April 1987 (age 39)
- Place of birth: Dubai, United Arab Emirates
- Height: 1.82 m (6 ft 0 in)
- Positions: Attacking midfielder; forward

Youth career
- 1993–2005: Högaborgs BK

Senior career*
Years	Team	Apps	(Gls)
2005–2007	Helsingborgs IF	23	(1)
2006	→ Randers FC (loan)	3	(0)
2007	→ Bunkeflo IF (loan)	19	(5)
2008–2013	IFK Norrköping	101	(29)
2013–2014	Helsingborgs IF	10	(8)
2014	→ Al-Shabab (loan)	6	(2)
2014–2015	Shanghai Dongya	9	(2)
2015	Baniyas	8	(2)
2015–2021	Hammarby IF	100	(16)
2017	→ IF Brommapojkarna (loan)	7	(0)
Total		286	(65)

International career^{‡}
2002–2003	Sweden U17	17	(4)
2004–2006	Sweden U19	11	(2)
2007	Sweden U21	1	(0)

Managerial career
- 2021–2022: Hammarby IF (assistant)
- 2023: Hammarby TFF
- 2023–: Al Wasl (assistant)
- * Club domestic league appearances and goals as of 15 November 2020 ‡ National team caps and goals as of 22 January 2017

Imad Khalili (Arabic: عماد خليلي; born 3 April 1987) is a Swedish former professional footballer who played as an attacking midfielder or forward. He is the assistant coach of Al Wasl in the UAE Pro League.

== Club career ==
=== Breakthrough ===
At age five, Khalili began playing football at the local club Högaborgs BK. He made his senior debut for the side in 2002, aged 16, and attracted interest from several big clubs around Europe. He had a trial with the Scottish club Celtic FC but chose not to move abroad, on the advice of the Swedish international Henrik Larsson, who also had started his career at Högaborg.

Tired of the interest surrounding him, Khalili took a one-and-a-half-year break from playing football between the summer of 2003 and the beginning of 2005. He ultimately signed a three-year deal with Helsingborgs IF in Allsvenskan. However, he had a hard time establishing himself at the club, enjoying loan spells at both Randers FC in the Danish Superliga and Bunkeflo IF in Superettan during the upcoming seasons.

In December 2007, he joined IFK Norrköping on a permanent deal. The club had just won a promotion to Allsvenskan. The team struggled in the league play during the season of 2008 resulting in an immediate relegation to the second tier. Khalili would however establish himself as a key member of the squad during the following seasons, enjoying another promotion to Allsvenskan in 2010.

=== Top scorer ===
Between 2011 and 2013 he played as a regular in Allsvenskan for the club from the county of Östergötland, making 37 appearances whilst scoring 13 goals in the top tier. During the midseason of 2013 he attracted interest from his former club Helsingborgs IF, who completed the transfer of Khalili in August the same year.

He continued his impressive scoring form during the 2013 season at his new club, eventually being crowned as the top scorer of Allsvenskan with 15 goals in total.

=== Years abroad ===
Before the 2014 season, he attracted interest from abroad, signing a loan deal with Al-Shabab in Saudi Arabia. He enjoyed a successful stint at the club, scoring a spectacular soloist strike in a 2–1 win against Al-Nassr in March 2014.

He signed for Shanghai Dongya in the Chinese Super League during the summer of 2014 on a permanent deal. Khalili went on to make 9 appearances for the side, scoring twice, before being deemed surplus to requirements due to the international players policy in the league. He was subsequently released from his contract on 1 February 2015.

Soon after, he signed a short time-contract with Baniyas, returning to his birth country United Arab Emirates. He featured in 8 games for the club during the spring, scoring twice, before leaving on a free in May 2015.

=== Return to Sweden ===
On 7 July 2015, he signed a four-and-a-half-year contract with the Stockholm-based club Hammarby IF in Allsvenskan. There he reunited with his former manager at IFK Norrköping, Mats Jingblad – now the sporting director of Hammarby.

During the second half of 2015 and throughout the whole 2016 season, Khalili failed to impress then manager Nanne Bergstrand, subsequently only being used as a substitute player. He scored his first competitive goal for the club on 17 July 2016, in a 3–3 draw against Falkenbergs FF on home turf.

After only making five appearances midway through the 2017 season, under the reign of new manager Jakob Michelsen, Khalili went out on loan to Brommapojkarna. The six month-deal with the Superettan club was announced on 11 August 2017. He made his debut for the side only a few days later, coming on as a second half sub, in a 1–1 away draw against Varberg. Khalili ultimately made 7 appearances for Brommapojkarna, as they won promotion to Allsvenskan, but returned to Hammarby at the start of 2018.

In January 2018, Hammarby switched manager once again with Stefan Billborn taking over as head coach. Khalili received much playing time during the pre-season and scored in a Svenska Cupen 3–3 draw against GAIS on 25 February. Khalili began the league play as a starter and scored a brace in the third round, as Hammarby won 4–0 against his former club Brommapojkarna on 16 April. He ultimately finished the 2018 season with scoring three goals in 21 league games, as Hammarby finished 4th in the table.

On 20 February 2019, Khalili signed a one-year extension with Hammarby. He played 23 games during the campaign, scoring eight goals, as the club finished 3rd in Allsvenskan after eight straight wins at the end of the season.

In 2020, a season postponed due to the COVID-19 pandemic, Khalili mostly came on from the bench and played 22 games in total, scoring four league goals, as his side disappointedly finished 8th in the table.

On 14 April 2021, it was announced that Khalili would become an assistant coach at Hammarby, focusing on individual development in the squad, as well as still being eligible as a player for the rest of the year. On 30 May 2021, Khalili won the 2020–21 Svenska Cupen, the main domestic cup, with Hammarby IF through a 5–4 win on penalties (0–0 after full-time) against BK Häcken in the final.

== International career ==
Imad Khalili won several caps for the Swedish under-17s, under-19s and under-21s in his younger days.

In 2014, he accepted an offer to play internationally for Palestine, but withdrew from the squad due to an injury. He was eligible to play for either Palestine, UAE or Sweden at senior level.

== Coaching career ==
He worked as the assistant coach of Hammarby's senior squad in both 2021 and 2022, focused on the individual development of players. In early 2023, Khalili became the head coach of their feeder team Hammarby TFF in Ettan, Sweden's third tier. He left the club on 2 July 2023, becoming the assistant coach to his former colleague Miloš Milojević at Al Wasl in the UAE Pro League.

== Personal life ==
Khalili was born in Dubai, United Arab Emirates. His parents are Palestinians from Lebanon. At a young age, the family settled in the town of Helsingborg in southern Sweden.

He is the cousin of fellow professional footballer Abdul Khalili, who was part of the Sweden under-21 squad which won the 2015 European Championship. Another cousin, Moustafa Zeidan, previously played in the youth system at Aston Villa.

== Career statistics ==
=== Club ===
As of match played 7 March 2021

Appearances and goals by club, season and competition
Club	Season	League			Cup		Continental		Total	
Club	Season	Division	Apps	Goals	Apps	Goals	Apps	Goals	Apps	Goals
Helsingborgs IF	2005	Allsvenskan	15	1	—		—		15	1
Helsingborgs IF	2006	Allsvenskan	8	0	—		—		8	0
Helsingborgs IF	2007	Allsvenskan	4	0	—		—		4	0
Helsingborgs IF	Total		27	1	0	0	0	0	27	1
Randers FC (loan)	2006–07	Danish Superliga	2	0	0	0	—		2	0
IF Limhamn Bunkeflo (loan)	2008	Superettan	18	6	0	0	—		18	6
IFK Norrköping	2008	Allsvenskan	17	2	—		—		17	2
IFK Norrköping	2009	Superettan	19	8	1	0	—		20	1
IFK Norrköping	2010	Superettan	18	7	2	0	—		20	7
IFK Norrköping	2011	Allsvenskan	14	2	0	0	—		14	2
IFK Norrköping	2012	Allsvenskan	20	4	0	0	—		20	4
IFK Norrköping	2013	Allsvenskan	13	7	3	0	—		16	7
IFK Norrköping	Total		101	30	6	0	0	0	107	30
Helsingborgs IF	2013	Allsvenskan	10	8	1	0	—		11	8
Al-Shabab (loan)	2013–14	Saudi Professional League	6	2	0	0	4	0	10	2
Shanghai	2014	Chinese Super League	9	2	0	0	—		9	2
Baniyas	2014–15	UAE Pro League	8	2	0	0	—		8	2
Hammarby IF	2015	Allsvenskan	12	0	0	0	—		12	0
Hammarby IF	2016	Allsvenskan	17	1	4	1	0	0	21	1
Hammarby IF	2017	Allsvenskan	5	0	2	1	0	0	7	1
Hammarby IF	2018	Allsvenskan	21	3	4	1	0	0	25	4
Hammarby IF	2019	Allsvenskan	23	8	1	0	0	0	24	8
Hammarby IF	2020	Allsvenskan	22	4	4	1	1	0	27	4
Hammarby IF	2021	Allsvenskan	0	0	1	0	0	0	0	0
Hammarby IF	Total		100	16	16	4	1	0	117	19
IF Brommapojkarna (loan)	2017	Superettan	7	0	0	0	—		7	0
Career total			286	67	23	4	5	0	315	71

== Honours ==
Al-Shabab

- Kings Cup: 2014

IF Brommapojkarna

- Superettan: 2017

Hammarby IF

- Svenska Cupen: 2020–21

Individual

- Allsvenskan top scorer: 2013
