= Mats Solheim =

Norwegian footballer (born 1987)

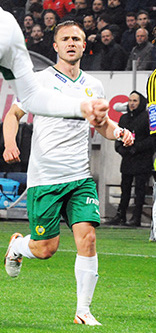
- Solheim playing for Hammarby in 2015

Personal information
- Full name: Mats Goberg Solheim
- Date of birth: 3 December 1987 (age 38)
- Place of birth: Loen, Norway
- Height: 1.78 m (5 ft 10 in)
- Position: Defender

Youth career
- Loen

Senior career*
Years	Team	Apps	(Gls)
–2004	Loen		
2005–2006	Stryn		
2006–2011	Sogndal	115	(18)
2012–2014	Kalmar	50	(5)
2015–2019	Hammarby IF	111	(8)
2020–2021	Stabæk	40	(3)
- * Club domestic league appearances and goals

Mats Goberg Solheim (born 3 December 1987) is a former Norwegian footballer who played as a defender.

== Career ==
=== Sogndal ===
Solheim started his career at the local club Loen IL, continuing at Stryn TIL in the lower divisions. He initially played as a striker. He attracted interest from the professional club Sogndal, then playing in the Norwegian second tier, during the summer of 2006. He subsequently joined the club and went on to enjoy a promotion to Tippeligaen four seasons later, in 2010.

During his time at Sogndal he got known as a utility player, being used in almost every outfield position. He has since established himself as a natural wing back on either flanks.

Solheim played a total of 25 games, scoring 4 times, during the 2011 Tippeligaen-season. He attracted interest from several other Norwegian clubs after the successful campaign, but opted to move abroad, signing for Kalmar FF in the Swedish Allsvenskan.

=== Kalmar FF ===
He had a rough start to his stint at Kalmar FF, when he injured his anterior cruciate ligament in February 2012 during the pre-season. He was forced to the sideline throughout the rest of the year.

Solheim made his competitive debut for Kalmar on 2 April 2013 against Syrianska FC, on the first match day of the 2013 Allsvenskan. He crowned his debut for the side by scoring in a 3–0 victory. He played as a regular at Kalmar during the upcoming two seasons, featuring in a total of 50 games in Allsvenskan, scoring on 5 occasions.

=== Hammarby IF ===
On 31 March 2015, the last day of the Swedish transfer window, Hammarby IF announced that they had signed Solheim on a three-year contract. He reunited with his former manager Nanne Bergstrand, who first had brought him to Sweden, at the Stockholm-based outfit.

Solheim established himself as a first choice left defender at Hammarby during the 2015 season. He missed out on the whole first half of the 2016 season due to another, less serious, knee injury.

=== Stabæk ===
In November 2019, Solheim returned to Norwegian football, joining Stabæk on a three-year contract. He retired in August 2021 to become a banker.

== Career statistics ==
Appearances and goals by club, season and competition
Club	Season	League			Cup		Other		Total	
Club	Season	Division	Apps	Goals	Apps	Goals	Apps	Goals	Apps	Goals
Sogndal	2006	1. divisjon	8	0	0	0	—		8	0
Sogndal	2007	1. divisjon	18	3	0	0	—		18	3
Sogndal	2008	1. divisjon	28	5	1	0	2 (Note: Appearance(s) in promotion play-offs)	0	31	5
Sogndal	2009	1. divisjon	14	5	0	0	1	0	15	5
Sogndal	2010	1. divisjon	22	1	2	0	—		24	1
Sogndal	2011	Eliteserien	25	4	4	1	—		29	5
Sogndal	Total		115	18	7	1	3	0	125	19
Kalmar	2012	Allsvenskan	0	0	0	0	—		0	0
Kalmar	2013	Allsvenskan	24	3	1	1	—		25	4
Kalmar	2014	Allsvenskan	26	2	1	0	—		27	2
Kalmar	Total		50	5	2	1	—		52	6
Hammarby IF	2015	Allsvenskan	26	2	1	0	—		27	2
Hammarby IF	2016	Allsvenskan	16	2	1	0	—		17	2
Hammarby IF	2017	Allsvenskan	27	1	3	0	—		30	1
Hammarby IF	2018	Allsvenskan	15	0	2	0	—		17	0
Hammarby IF	2019	Allsvenskan	27	3	3	1	—		30	4
Hammarby IF	Total		111	8	10	1	—		121	9
Stabæk	2020	Eliteserien	29	3	—		—		29	3
Stabæk	2021	Eliteserien	11	0	1	0	—		12	0
Stabæk	Total		40	3	1	0	—		41	3
Career total			316	34	20	3	3	0	339	37

== Honours ==
Sogndal

- Norwegian First Division: 2010
