= Richard Magyar =

Swedish footballer (born 1991)

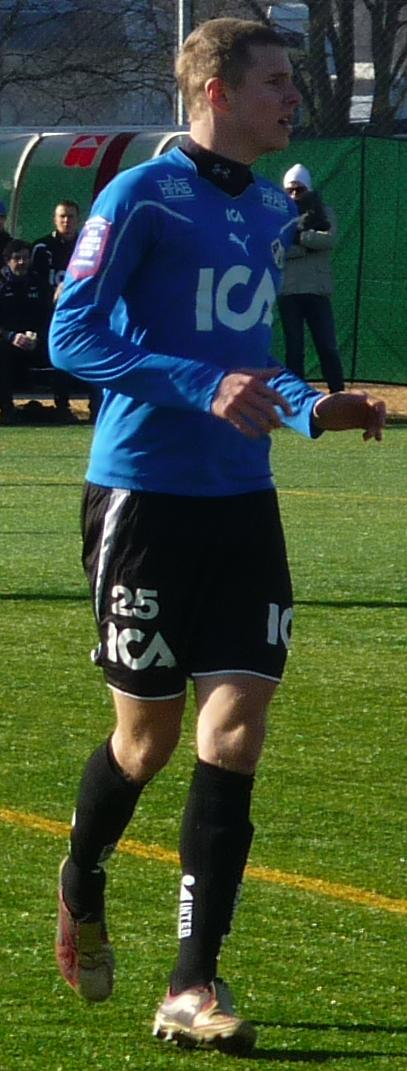
- Magyar in 2011

Personal information
- Full name: Richard Göran Emil Magyar
- Date of birth: 3 May 1991 (age 35)
- Place of birth: Malmö, Sweden
- Height: 1.92 m (6 ft 4 in)
- Position: Centre-back

Youth career
- Åkarps IF
- GIF Nike
- 2006: Lunds BK
- 2007: BK Astrio
- 2008–2009: Halmstads BK

Senior career*
Years	Team	Apps	(Gls)
2010–2014	Halmstads BK	106	(6)
2014–2015	FC Aarau	7	(0)
2015–2017	Hammarby IF	41	(1)
2017–2019	Greuther Fürth	47	(4)
2017–2018	→ Greuther Fürth II	2	(1)
2019–2022	Hammarby IF	51	(4)

International career^{‡}
2010	Sweden U19	2	(0)
2011–2012	Sweden U21	3	(0)
- * Club domestic league appearances and goals as of 28 November 2022 ‡ National team caps and goals as of 16 August 2012

Richard Göran Emil Magyar (Hungarian pronunciation: [ˈmɒɟɒr]; born 3 May 1991) is a Swedish former professional footballer who played as a centre-back.

In a 12-year career, he represented and captained both Halmstads BK and Hammarby IF in Allsvenskan, also spending time abroad with FC Aarau and Greuther Fürth.

== Early life ==
Magyar's father is of Hungarian descent. He started his career with local club Åkarps IF at the age of 8, followed by a moved to GoIF Nike. At the age of 15 he went on trial with Malmö FF but eventually signed for Lunds BK in 2006. A year later, his family moved to Halmstad, where he signed for BK Astrio. In 2008, he moved to local rival Halmstads BK, spending only a year in the youth squad and was also part the team that won the first edition of the U21 Allsvenskan championship in 2009.

== Career ==
=== Halmstads BK ===
Prior to the 2010 season, Magyar was promoted to Halmstad BK's senior squad as a trainee. After sitting on the bench for several games, he made his debut in Allsvenskan on 5 May for Halmstads BK against Kalmar FF, at age 19, starting as teammate Tomas Žvirgždauskas had picked up an injury.

In 2011, Magyar was used as a fringe starter for Halmstad, making 22 league appearances, as the club finished at the foot of the Allsvenskan table and suffered a relegation. Playing in the second tier Superettan in 2012, Magyar made 27 appearances under manager Jens Gustafsson and led his side to a third place in the table, which meant that Halmstad advanced to a promotion play-off to Allsvenskan where they eliminated GIF Sundsvall by 6–4 on aggregate.

In 2013, Magyar made 29 appearances in Allsvenskan, scoring once, as the club finished 14th in the table. Once again, Halmstad eliminated GIF Sundsvall in the relegation play-offs. Before the 2014 season, following the retirement of Stefan Selaković, Magyar was appointed as the new team captain at Halmstad. Halmstad finished 10th in the Allsvenskan table, but Magyar decided to leave the club when his contract expired, making 106 senior appearances in total.

=== FC Aarau ===
On 17 January 2015, Magyar signed a two-and-a-half-year deal with FC Aarau. At his new club, Magyar teamed up with another former player of Halmstad, midfielder Dusan Djuric. He eventually played six league games during the spring of 2015, but was unable to prevent Aarau from getting relegated from the Swiss Super League. Activating a clause, Magyar was released from his contract at the end of the season.

=== Hammarby IF ===
On 7 July 2015, Magyar returned to Sweden and signed a two-year deal with newly promoted club Hammarby IF. He went on to make 11 league appearances during the second half of the Allsvenskan season, pairing up with Lars Sætra in the central defence, as the side finished 11th in the table.

In 2016, Magyar begun the campaign as a starter, but lost his place in favour of Joseph Aidoo and David Boo Wiklander. He made 20 league appearances, as Hammarby finished 11th in the table for a second consecutive season.

In 2017, Magyar flourished under new manager Jakob Michelsen and started in all of the first ten rounds of the Allsvenskan campaign. On 5 June 2017, when his contract expired, it was announced that Magyar would leave Hammarby, in spite of being offered a new deal by the club.

=== Greuther Fürth ===
On 5 June 2017, Magyar joined 2. Bundesliga side SpVgg Greuther Fürth on a two-year contract. He played 47 games for the club, scoring four goals, across two seasons.

=== Return to Hammarby ===
On 11 July 2019, Magyar returned to his former club Hammarby IF, signing a three-year contract. Forming a defensive partnership with Mads Fenger, Magyar helped Hammarby to a 3rd place in the 2019 Allsvenskan table, after eight straight wins at the end of the season.

On 30 May 2021, Magyar won the 2020–21 Svenska Cupen, the main domestic cup, with Hammarby through a 5–4 win on penalties (0–0 after full-time) against BK Häcken in the final.

On 2 April 2022, Magyar was appointed as the new club captain of Hammarby by head coach Martí Cifuentes. On 22 July 2022, it was announced that Magyar would be sidelined for at least a few months due to a foot injury. On 27 November 2022, Magyar announced that he would retire from professional football with immediate effect.

== International career ==
In May 2011, Magyar was for the first time summoned to the Swedish U21 team. However, an injury forced Magyar to miss out. Marcus Törnstrand was called up to replace Magyar.

== Career statistics ==
As of match played 30 October 2022

Appearances and goals by club, season and competition
Club	Season	League			Cup		Other		Total	
Club	Season	Division	Apps	Goals	Apps	Goals	Apps	Goals	Apps	Goals
Halmstads BK	2010	Allsvenskan	3	0	1	0	—		4	0
Halmstads BK	2011	Allsvenskan	22	0	1	0	—		23	0
Halmstads BK	2012	Superettan	27	4	4	1	2 (Note: Appearances in the Superettan promotion play-offs)	1	33	6
Halmstads BK	2013	Allsvenskan	29	1	3	0	2 (Note: Appearances in the Allsvenskan relegation play-offs)	0	34	1
Halmstads BK	2014	Allsvenskan	25	1	1	0	—		26	1
Halmstads BK	Total		106	6	10	1	4	1	120	8
Aarau	2014–15	Super League	7	0	0	0	—		7	0
Aarau	Total		7	0	0	0	0	0	7	0
Hammarby IF	2015	Allsvenskan	11	0	0	0	—		11	0
Hammarby IF	2016	Allsvenskan	20	1	5	0	—		25	1
Hammarby IF	2017	Allsvenskan	10	0	2	0	—		12	0
Hammarby IF	Total		41	1	7	0	0	0	48	1
Greuther Fürth II	2017–18	Regionalliga Bayern	2	1	—		—		2	1
Greuther Fürth	2017–18	2. Bundesliga	19	2	1	0	—		20	2
Greuther Fürth	2018–19	2. Bundesliga	28	2	1	0	—		29	2
Greuther Fürth	Total		49	5	2	0	0	0	51	5
Hammarby IF	2019	Allsvenskan	14	2	1	0	—		15	2
Hammarby IF	2020	Allsvenskan	14	1	3	0	1 (Note: Appearances in UEFA Europa League)	0	18	1
Hammarby IF	2021	Allsvenskan	15	1	3	0	0	0	18	1
Hammarby IF	2022	Allsvenskan	8	0	5	2	—		13	2
Hammarby IF	Total		51	4	12	2	1	0	64	6
Career total			254	16	31	3	5	1	290	20

== Honours ==
Hammarby IF

- Svenska Cupen: 2020–21
