= Petter Andersson =

Swedish footballer

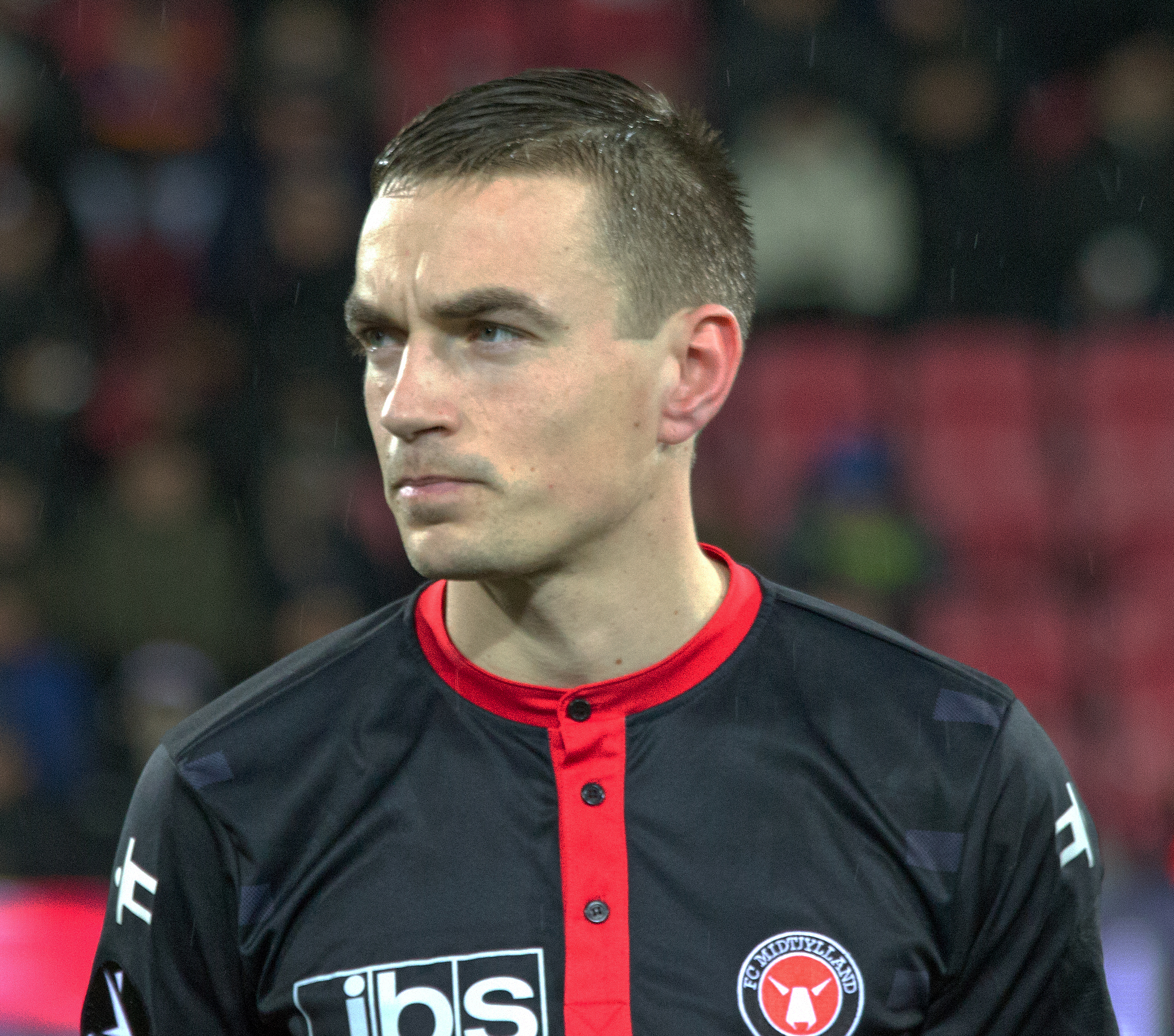

Personal information
- Full name: Lars Petter Andersson
- Date of birth: 20 February 1985 (age 41)
- Place of birth: Ljusvattnet, Skellefteå, Sweden
- Height: 1.78 m (5 ft 10 in)
- Position: Midfielder

Youth career
- 1999–2000: Ljusvattnets IF

Senior career*
Years	Team	Apps	(Gls)
2001	Sunnanå SK	10	(2)
2002–2003	Skellefteå FF	34	(14)
2003–2008	Hammarby IF	103	(21)
2008–2012	Groningen	65	(13)
2012–2016	FC Midtjylland	73	(19)
2016	Hammarby IF	0	(0)
Total		285	(69)

International career
2001–2002	Sweden U17	14	(3)
2003	Sweden U19	8	(6)
2004–2006	Sweden U21	20	(0)
2005	Sweden	2	(0)
- * Club domestic league appearances and goals

Lars Petter Andersson (born 20 February 1985) is a Swedish former professional footballer who played as a midfielder. He represented Hammarby IF, captained FC Groningen, and won the Danish Superliga with FC Midtjylland during his career. He also won two caps for the Sweden national team in 2005.

== Early life ==
Andersson grew up in the village of Ljusvattnet, outside the city of Skellefteå. During his early teens, he competed in cross-country skiing and golf as well as playing ice hockey. He was selected to represent the county of Västerbotten in the TV-pucken at age 15, but turned down the offer to concentrate on playing football.

He started his football career at the local club Ljusvattnets IF, before moving on to Sunnanå SK where he made his senior debut in Division 5, the seventh highest tier, aged 14. In his later youth years, Andersson played with Skellefteå FF in Division 2, the Swedish fourth tier.

Several top clubs in Allsvenskan soon got interested in securing Andersson's signature. Among these were GIF Sundsvall, IFK Göteborg, Malmö FF and Djurgårdens IF, who all failed their attempts. Ultimately, Andersson opted to move to Hammarby IF after several trials with the club. He turned down a move to the fellow Stockholm-based side AIK at a late stage, since the club's luxurious presentation of itself caused a culture crash and scared Andersson off.

== Club career ==
=== Hammarby IF ===
After joining Hammarby halfway through the 2003 season, the 18-year-old Andersson made two competitive appearances for his new side the same year. His debut in Allsvenskan came against Örebro SK on 20 October in a 1–1 draw, coming on as a second half-substitute replacing veteran midfielder Christer Fursth, who coincidentally played the last game in his professional career.

Ahead of the 2004 season, Hammarby and manager Anders Linderoth promoted several other youngsters to the senior squad on permanent basis; Björn Runström, Fredrik Stoor and Erkan Zengin. Among the newcomers, Andersson made the biggest impact for Hammarby during the same season, establishing himself as a regular. He scored a brace, his first ever goals for Hammarby, on 2 May 2004 in a 2–1 win against Örebro SK on away turf. Weeks later, Andersson scored the lone goal in a 1–0 derby win against fierce rivals AIK on Råsunda. Andersson was mostly used as an offensive central midfielder during the season, as Hammarby finished sixth in the table.

In 2005, Andersson was mainly used as a forward. He scored six goals in 25 appearances as Hammarby finished fourth in the league, just missing out on a medal place. Notably, Andersson scored a brace in a 4–0 home win against Landskrona BoIS on 17 July. He also renewed his contract with the club, lasting until the end of 2007.

Halfway through the 2006 season, Hammarby was placed first in Allsvenskan. When the new signing Paulinho Guará claimed the striker position, Andersson returned to the midfield mostly being used as a winger. However, Hammarby dropped of in the table after the summer break and ultimately finished third in the league. Andersson's season was also cut short in July the same year, since he attracted a serious groin injury.

Andersson made his comeback on the pitch on match day 4 of the 2007 Allsvenskan. He scored a brace, both shots being from long range, as Hammarby defeated Brommapojkarna in a 4–0 home win on 29 April. Throughout the season, Andersson once again found himself playing as a forward, due to the impressive performances of newly signed Sebastián Eguren on the central midfield. During the summer, Hammarby participated in the 2007 UEFA Intertoto Cup. Andersson played a huge part in the campaign, under the reign of new manager Tony Gustavsson, where the club finished as one of the eleven joint winners of the tournament. As a result, Hammarby took part in the 2007–08 UEFA Cup qualification. After knocking out the Norwegian side Fredrikstad in the second qualifying round, Hammarby faced S.C. Braga from Portugal in the next round. On 20 September, Andersson scored a brace as Hammarby won 2–1 on home turf in the first leg. However, Hammarby failed to qualify for the group stage in the tournament as Braga won 6–2 on aggregate. In the domestic league, Hammarby finished in sixth place the same year. Andersson also opted to renew his contract with the club up until the end of 2009.

Petter Andersson retained his excellent form into the 2008 season, now once again playing in his natural role as an offensive midfielder. Notably, Andersson scored a brace in a 4–3 win against IFK Norrköping on home turf in July. Several clubs in other, bigger, European leagues soon got interested in securing the 23-year-old's services. Among these were F.C. Twente, with manager Steve McLaren scouting Andersson in Sweden on several occasions. Hammarby failed to produce any sort of challenge in the league this year and finished on 8th place in the table.

=== Groningen ===
On 1 September 2008, the final day of the international transfer window, he signed for the Dutch club FC Groningen on a four-year deal. The Eredivisie outfit paid a transfer fee of 880.000 euros, or 8,5 million Swedish crowns, to Hammarby.

Andersson enjoyed a successful start in Groningen while establishing himself as a key player in manager Ron Jans squad, who already consisted of several other Swedish players: Marcus Berg, Andreas Granqvist and Fredrik Stenman. He scored in just his second appearance for Groningen in a game against Heracles, playing as a forward, replacing Stef Nijland that recently had been sold to PSV Eindhoven. In total, he would come to score four goals in his first eight matches for the side. On 25 January 2009, Andersson suffered a serious knee injury in a match against AFC Ajax, which kept him off the pitch for the rest of the season. The club eventually finished sixth in the league.

Being sidelined for six months, Andersson returned to training and featured in Groningen's reserve team ahead of the 2009–10 season. He suffered a major setback as he, once again, tore his cruciate ligament during the fall of 2009. This caused him to miss the whole season.

Andersson made his comeback on the pitch on 23 October 2010, after being sidelined for 22 months because of injuries. He came on as a late substitute in a match against NEC Nijmegen and scored in the 90th minute, deciding the final result to 3–2 in NEC's favour. Andersson would onwards establish himself as a key player in manager Pieter Huistra's starting eleven. Notably, Andersson scored a brace in an important away match against ADO Den Haag on 1 May 2011, replacing the injured Tim Matavz in the starting eleven, securing a 4–2 win for Groningen. Weeks later, on 22 May, Andersson scored again in a match against Heracles in the play-off tournament for a spot in the second qualifying round of the 2011–12 UEFA Europa League. In the end, Groningen failed to qualify for any international play.

Ahead of the 2011–12 season, Andersson was named the new captain of Groningen, following the departure of fellow Swede Andreas Granqvist to Genoa. Manager Peter Huistra said Andersson was a perfect role model, citing his ability to "handle difficult backlashes" and "good language skills". Injury free, Andersson played a key part as Groningen avoided relegation from the top tier, eventually finishing 14th. He played 33 league games, scoring four goals, throughout the whole season. He could, however, not agree terms on a new contract with Groningen. On 18 May 2012, Andersson's departure on a free transfer officially got announced.

=== FC Midtjylland ===
In June 2012, Andersson signed a four-year contract with the Danish club FC Midtjylland. Andersson was brought in to replace Jakob Poulsen on the central midfield, who recently had been signed by Monaco.

He immediately established himself as a key player at Midtjylland. Notably, he scored in a 3–0 win against Randers FC on 12 May 2013 during the later stages of the season. Midtjylland eventually finished sixth in the Danish Superliga and failed to compete for international play. Andersson scored nine goals, a new career best, in a total of 26 appearances. He attracted interest from the domestic giants FC Copenhagen during the summer of 2013, while Midtjylland manager Glen Riddersholm named Andersson as one of the best players in the history of the club.

Andersson eventually remained at the side and continued his fine scoring form into the start of the 2013–14 season. He scored the single goal of the game as Midtjylland won against FC Copenhagen, 1–0, on 28 July 2013. A less severe knee injury would later rule Andersson out from play for almost two months. Andersson would ultimately make 20 league appearances for the side during the season, scoring six goals, as Midtjylland finished third in the table. Most notably, Andersson scored a brace in a 4–0 away win against AGF Århus on 18 April 2014, with Kristian Bak Nielsen providing the assists for both of the goals. He occasionally also captained the side during the season.

In 2014–15, Midtjylland won the Danish top tier for the first time in the club's history with Andersson being a key player. He featured in 23 league games, scoring four goals, as Midtjylland secured the title after a draw against FC Vestsjælland on 21 May 2015.

In the beginning of the 2015–16 season, Midtjylland subsequently took part in the UEFA Europa League qualification rounds. In the play-off round, Midtjylland surprisingly knocked out the English Premier League-side Southampton with 2–1 on aggregate. Andersson played both legs in August 2015 and Claus Steinlein, the club's director of football, named his performances as the best in the team.

Andersson's season would however end soon after, since he was forced to perform surgery on his knees. He managed to appear in four domestic games in the beginning of the season, and played his last minutes of football for Midtjylland on 17 September 2015 against Legia Warsaw in the group stage of the Europa League. Andersson got subbed off at half time, as Midtjylland secured a 1–0 win. On 9 April 2016, Midtjylland confirmed that Andersson was going to leave the club at the expiration of his contract the upcoming summer.

=== Return to Hammarby IF and retirement ===
On 16 July 2016, Hammarby IF announced that Petter Andersson had signed a two-and-a-half-year contract with the club. As Andersson still was rehabilitating his injuries, Hammarby's director of football Mats Jingblad told that he would be fully fit in early 2017.

In late 2016, he however chose to retire from football due to major setbacks in his rehabilitation. Andersson did not make a single appearance for Hammarby during this second stint at the club.

== International career ==
Andersson won 14 caps for the Swedish U17s between 2001 and 2002, scoring four goals. In 2003, he excelled at international level and scored six goals in eight appearances for the Swedish U19s. He also played 20 games for the Swedish U21s between 2004 and 2006.

He debuted for the Sweden national team on 22 January 2005, coming on as a substitute for George Mourad in the 72nd minute in a friendly game against South Korea. He won his second and last cap four days later, in a friendly game against Mexico, where he replaced Niclas Alexandersson in the 82nd minute.

== Style of play ==
Andersson's natural position was as an offensive midfielder or second striker. Occasionally, he was also used as a forward or winger.

His game intelligence and shooting were regarded as among his key strengths, along with his pace both with and without the ball.

Andersson's playing style was sometimes described as irrational and dynamic. Tommy Söderberg, former manager of the Sweden national team, compared him with Freddie Ljungberg and praised his technique.

== Personal life ==
He was nicknamed "Ljusvattnets Henry" during his playing career, as a homage to his birth village and the French striker Thierry Henry.

== Career statistics ==
As of 5 May 2017.

Club performance			League		Cup		Continental		Total	
Club	Season	League	Apps	Goals	Apps	Goals	Apps	Goals	Apps	Goals
Sweden			League		Svenska Cupen		Europe		Total	
Sunnanå SK	2001	Division 3 Norra Norrland	10	2	—		—		10	2
Skellefteå FF	2002	Division 2 Norrland	21	9	—		—		21	9
Skellefteå FF	2003	Division 2 Norrland	13	5	—		—		13	5
Hammarby IF	2003	Allsvenskan	2	0	0	0	—		2	0
Hammarby IF	2004	Allsvenskan	26	4	5	0	3	1	34	5
Hammarby IF	2005	Allsvenskan	25	6	2	0	3	2	30	8
Hammarby IF	2006	Allsvenskan	9	1	2	1	4	2	15	4
Hammarby IF	2007	Allsvenskan	22	4	2	2	7	2	31	8
Hammarby IF	2008	Allsvenskan	19	6	3	2	—		22	8
Netherlands			League		KNVB Cup		Europe		Total	
Groningen	2008–09	Eredivisie	15	5	2	0	—		17	5
Groningen	2009–10	Eredivisie	0	0	0	0	—		0	0
Groningen	2010–11	Eredivisie	17	4	6	1	—		23	5
Groningen	2011–12	Eredivisie	33	4	1	0	—		34	4
Denmark			League		Danish Cup		Europe		Total	
Midtjylland	2012–13	Danish Superliga	26	9	2	1	1	0	29	10
Midtjylland	2013–14	Danish Superliga	20	6	1	0	—		21	6
Midtjylland	2014–15	Danish Superliga	23	4	0	0	1	0	24	4
Midtjylland	2015–16	Danish Superliga	4	0	0	0	6	0	10	0
Sweden			League		Svenska Cupen		Europe		Total	
Hammarby IF	2016	Allsvenskan	0	0	—		—		0	0
Hammarby IF	2017	Allsvenskan	0	0	—		—		0	0
Sweden			147	37	14	5	17	7	178	49
Netherlands			65	13	9	1	0	0	74	14
Denmark			73	19	3	1	8	0	84	20
Career total			285	69	26	7	25	7	336	83

== Honours ==
Midtjylland

- Danish Superliga: 2014–15
