= Erik Israelsson =

Swedish footballer

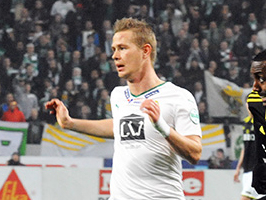

Personal information
- Full name: Erik Gustav Roger Israelsson
- Date of birth: 25 February 1989 (age 37)
- Place of birth: Kalmar, Sweden
- Height: 1.83 m (6 ft 0 in)
- Position: Midfielder

Youth career
- Lindsdals IF

Senior career*
Years	Team	Apps	(Gls)
2008–2013	Kalmar FF	89	(13)
2014–2017	Hammarby IF	76	(20)
2017–2019	PEC Zwolle	17	(1)
2018–2019	→ Vålerenga (loan)	15	(0)
2019–2020	Vålerenga	1	(0)
2020–2022	Kalmar	35	(4)
Total		233	(38)

International career
2006	Sweden U17	4	(0)
2008	Sweden U19	4	(0)
2008	Sweden U21	1	(0)
- * Club domestic league appearances and goals

Erik Gustav Roger Israelsson (born 25 February 1989) is a Swedish former professional footballer who played as a midfielder. Starting off his career with Kalmar FF in 2008, he went on to represent Hammarby IF, PEC Zwolle, and Vålerenga before retiring at Kalmar FF in 2022.

== Club career ==
=== Early career and Kalmar ===
Israelsson joined Kalmar FF in 2005 from local club Lindsdals IF. He played three games during the 2008 Allsvenskan, when Kalmar were crowned champions. He became a regular at Kalmar from 2010 and onwards, playing 76 games during the following three seasons and scoring 13 times. Before the start of the 2013 Allsvenskan he incurred a fractured toe witch eventually caused him to miss half of the season.

=== Hammarby ===
On 6 December 2013, he signed for Hammarby IF. This shortly after Nanne Bergstrand, his former manager at Kalmar, had been appointed as Hammarby's new manager. During his first season at Hammarby, he helped he team to gain promotion to Allsvenskan. In 2015, he scored six goals in 22 games, being voted "player of the year" by the supporters of the club. In a local derby against AIK on 27 September 2015, he scored a late header which secured a 1–0 win for Hammarby. In the aftermath of the goal, he suffered a concussion as well as a broken foot. This goal was later voted as the "goal of the season" by the Hammarby supporters.

On 1 February 2016, he signed a new three-year deal with Hammarby, tying him to the club until 2018. In the 2016 season Israelsson was the club's top scorer, managing to strike 10 goals in the league play.

=== Zwolle ===
On 14 January 2017, it was announced that Israelsson had signed a 2.5-year deal with Dutch Eredivisie side PEC Zwolle. The transfer fee was undisclosed. He made his competitive debut for the side on 5 February 2017 in a game against Sparta Rotterdam. Israelsson was brought on as a substitute during the final stage of the game, scoring only minutes later whilst securing a 3–2 win for Zwolle.

=== Vålerenga ===
Israelsson first joined Vålerenga on loan in 2018, and then signed permanently until 2020.

=== Return to Kalmar and retirement ===
Israelsson announced his return to Kalmar FF ahead of the 2020 Allsvenskan season. He announced his retirement from professional football on 23 September 2022 after battling multiple injuries during his second stint at Kalmar FF.

== International career ==
Israelsson represented the Sweden U17, U19, and U21 teams between 2006 and 2008, winning a total of 9 youth caps.

== Honours ==
Kalmar

- Allsvenskan: 2008
- Supercupen: 2009

Hammarby

- Superettan: 2014
