= Alex (footballer, born August 1990) =

Brazilian footballer

Personal information
- Full name: Alexssander Medeiros de Azeredo
- Date of birth: 21 August 1990 (age 36)
- Place of birth: Aperibé, Brazil
- Height: 1.79 m (5 ft 10 in)
- Position: Striker

Youth career
- 2008–2009: CFZ

Senior career*
| Years | Team | Apps | (Gls) |
| 2010–2013 | Botafogo | 33 | (6) |
| 2012 | → Joinville (loan) | 11 | (4) |
| 2012–2013 | → Dibba Al Fujairah (loan) | 23 | (10) |
| 2014 | Joinville | 9 | (1) |
| 2014 | Al Khaleej | 20 | (10) |
| 2015 | Army United | 10 | (3) |
| 2016 | Hammarby IF | 28 | (5) |
| 2017 | Celaya | 9 | (1) |
| 2017–2018 | Silkeborg IF | 3 | (0) |
| 2019 | Bangu | 0 | (0) |
| 2019 | → Portuguesa RJ (loan) | 6 | (2) |
| 2019–2021 | Al Bataeh | 19 | (17) |
| 2021–2022 | Al Arabi | 26 | (18) |
| 2022–2023 | Al Hamriyah | 13 | (6) |
| 2023 | Masfout | 15 | (5) |
| 2023–2024 | Al Taawon | 20 | (16) |
| 2024–2025 | Al-Nahda | | |
| 2025 | Al Jazirah Al-Hamra | | |
- * Club domestic league appearances and goals as of 00:06, 22 March 2024 (UTC)

Alexssander Medeiros de Azeredo (Brazilian Portuguese: [aˈlɛks], born 21 August 1990), commonly known as Alex, is a Brazilian professional footballer who plays as a striker.

== Career ==
From 2010 to 2013 Alex played for Botafogo where he managed to make 33 appearances, scoring 6 goals, in three years. During this period he has played on loan even for Joinville and for Dibba Club in the United Arab Emirates, moving abroad for the first time. In 2014 had another short spell with Joinville, this time not on loan.

Alex then enjoyed shorter stints at Army United in Thailand.

On 1 January 2016, it was reported that he had signed for Brazilian club Resende Futebol Clube, immediately being loaned out to Swedish side Hammarby IF until the end of the season. But in April the same year, it was revealed that Hammarby initially had signed the player outright on a one-year contract.

After a promising start to the 2016 season with Hammarby, Alex failed to make an impact during the second half of the campaign. He left the club by mutual consent in early November the same year, after making 28 appearances in the league play and contributing with 5 goals.

Alex signed with Danish club Silkeborg IF on 14 June 2017. He left the club again at the end of 2018. He then joined Bangu in his home country.
