= Rômulo (footballer, born 1991) =

Brazilian footballer

Rómulo
Personal information
- Full name: Rômulo Cabral Pereira Pinto
- Date of birth: 2 November 1991 (age 35)
- Place of birth: Rio de Janeiro, Brazil
- Height: 1.86 m (6 ft 1 in)
- Position: Forward

Team information
- Current team: Karlstad
- Number: 9

Youth career
- Botafogo

Senior career*
Years	Team	Apps	(Gls)
2012–2014	Friburguense	58	(15)
2014–2015	Atlético Paranaense		
2014	→ Ferroviária (loan)	6	(3)
2015	→ Paulista FC (loan)	12	(4)
2015–2016	Friburguense	16	(6)
2016–2017	Hammarby IF	43	(9)
2018–2019	Suphanburi	31	(10)
2019	→ BG Pathum United (loan)	10	(4)
2020–2021	SC Sagamihara	39	(13)
2021	Volta Redonda	12	(1)
2022–2023	Khon Kaen United	26	(5)
2023	→ Police Tero (loan)	7	(1)
2024–	Karlstad	16	(3)
- * Club domestic league appearances and goals as of 1 January 2025

Rômulo Cabral Pereira Pinto (born 2 November 1991 in Rio de Janeiro), commonly known as Rômulo (Brazilian Portuguese: [ˈʁõmulu]), is a Brazilian footballer who plays as a forward for Karlstad.

== Career ==
=== Brazil ===
Rômulo was born in Rio de Janeiro and started his career at the local club Botafogo. He, however, made his senior debut for Friburguense in the Campeonato Carioca during 2012. During the upcoming years, Rômulo would make a name for himself in the Brazilian lower divisions. He represented Friburguense in the during two different spells, making 74 appearances and scoring 21 goals in total.

=== Hammarby IF ===
In February 2016, Rômulo was scouted by Nanne Bergstrand, then manager of Hammarby IF in Allsvenskan. A month later, in March, Rômulo move abroad for the first time in his career by signing a two-year deal with the Swedish club. The transfer fee was reportedly set at 0.5 million Swedish kronor (approximately £55,000), as Friburguense sold their main striker due to financial difficulties.

After a tough start to his newly found career in Europe, mostly being used as a substitute player, Rômulo scored a hat-trick on 17 October 2016 against local rivals Djurgården in a spectacular derby fixture, helping his side secure a 4–2 win. Rômulo's involvement in the victory was later awarded as the "achievement of the year" by the club's supporters.

On 2 April 2017, Rômulo scored on the first match day of Allsvenskan, in a 2–1 away loss against IFK Norrköping. Throughout the first half of the season, Rômulo was used as the second choice striker behind Pa Dibba in new manager Jakob Michelsen's squad. On 4 June, Rômulo once again enjoyed a superb performance against arch rival Djurgårdens IF. He scored a brace as Hammarby won 3–1 on home turf. He was, however, used sparingly during the remainder of season and left the club at the expiration of his contract.

=== Karlstad ===
In March 2024, Rômulo returned to Sweden, joining Ettan Norra club Karlstad.

== Career statistics ==
=== Club ===
As of 14 July 2019.

Club	Season	League			FA Cup		League Cup		Continental		Total	
Club	Season	Division	Apps	Goals	Apps	Goals	Apps	Goals	Apps	Goals	Apps	Goals
Club Athletico Paranaense	2014	Campeonato Brasileiro Série A	0	0	0	0	0	0	0	0	0	0
Club Athletico Paranaense	Total		0	0	0	0	0	0	0	0	0	0
Ferroviária (loan)	2014	Campeonato Paulista Série A2	6	3	0	0	0	0	0	0	6	3
Ferroviária (loan)	Total		6	3	0	0	0	0	0	0	6	3
Paulista Futebol Clube (loan)	2015	Campeonato Paulista Série A2	12	4	0	0	0	0	0	0	12	4
Paulista Futebol Clube (loan)	Total		12	4	0	0	0	0	0	0	12	4
Friburguense	2016	Campeonato Carioca	9	5	0	0	0	0	0	0	9	5
Friburguense	Total		9	5	0	0	0	0	0	0	9	5
Club	Season	League			Svenska Cupen Cup		League Cup		Continental		Total	
Club	Season	Division	Apps	Goals	Apps	Goals	Apps	Goals	Apps	Goals	Apps	Goals
Hammarby IF	2016	Allsvenskan	26	5	2	0	0	0	0	0	28	5
Hammarby IF	2017	Allsvenskan	17	4	0	0	0	0	0	0	17	4
Hammarby IF	Total		43	9	2	0	0	0	0	0	45	9
Club	Season	League			Thai FA Cup		Thai League Cup		Continental		Total	
Club	Season	Division	Apps	Goals	Apps	Goals	Apps	Goals	Apps	Goals	Apps	Goals
Suphanburi F.C.	2018	Thai League 1	31	10	0	0	0	0	0	0	31	10
Suphanburi F.C.	Total		31	10	0	0	0	0	0	0	31	10
BG Pathum United F.C. (loan)	2019	Thai League 2	16	5	3	3	1	1	0	0	20	9
BG Pathum United F.C. (loan)	Total		16	5	3	3	1	1	0	0	20	9
Career total			13	6	0	0	0	0	6	2	19	8

== Style of play ==
Mats Jingblad, former director of football at Hammarby, has praised Rômulo as technical player with a great willingness to run and a strong defensive play.
