= Philip Haglund =

Swedish footballer

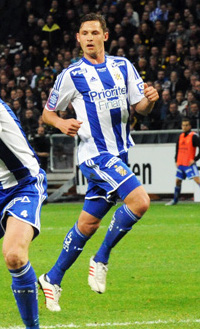

Personal information
- Full name: Philip Thomas Jesper Haglund
- Date of birth: 22 March 1987 (age 39)
- Place of birth: Stockholm, Sweden
- Height: 1.89 m (6 ft 2 in)
- Positions: Central midfielder; striker

Youth career
- –2006: IF Brommapojkarna

Senior career*
Years	Team	Apps	(Gls)
2006–2009	IF Brommapojkarna	71	(14)
2006–2007	→ Gröndals IK (loan)		
2010–2011	Heerenveen	25	(1)
2011–2014	IFK Göteborg	69	(8)
2015–2016	Hammarby IF	49	(3)
2017–2019	IK Sirius	82	(21)
2020	IF Brommapojkarna	17	(8)
Total		313	(55)
- * Club domestic league appearances and goals

Philip Thomas Jesper Haglund (born 22 March 1987) is a Swedish former professional footballer. A utility player, he played as a central midfielder and striker, and occasionally as a centre-back, during his career.

== Career ==
Born in Stockholm, Haglund began his career with IF Brommapojkarna during the successful 2006 season, which saw the team qualify for Allsvenskan. He has subsequently played in the professional top division of Swedish football. On 10 January 2010, SC Heerenveen signed the Swedish midfielder from IF Brommapojkarna until June 2014.

After a disappointing spell in the Netherlands, he signed a three-and-a-half-year contract with Allsvenskan club IFK Göteborg on 28 June 2011. He eventually went on to play 69 games for the club, scoring 8 goals, of which a majority was from the penalty spot. His stint at Göteborg effectively came to end when he damaged his cruciate ligament in a game against IFK Norrköping in May 2014, as the club decided to not offer him a new contract during the rehab period.

Instead, he signed a two-year deal with newly promoted Hammarby from his home town Stockholm. Originally the club planned to play him in a brand new role as a central defender, but he eventually went on to establish himself as a regular starter in a midfield position. He played a total of 49 games for the club during the 2015 and 2016 season, with the club finishing 11th in the table on both occasions. However, he left the club by mutual consent in December 2016 when his contract expired.

On 9 January 2017, Haglund signed a one-year deal with the newly promoted club IK Sirius from Uppsala. He left the club at the end of 2019. On 5 March 2020, Haglund returned to Brommapojkarna, signing a deal until the end of the year.

== Personal life ==
Haglund graduated from the science program of Blackebergs gymnasium in 2006. Haglund was enrolled at the Stockholm School of Economics and obtained his degree of Master of Science in Business and Economics in 2009. He lived in Vasastan when he played for IF Brommapojkarna.

During his stint at IFK Göteborg, Haglund was a regular blogger at the football magazine Offside.

Philip is also the founder and CEO of Gimi, a featured start-up from Stockholm.

== Career statistics ==
As of 9 January 2017

Club	Season	League		Cup		Continental		Total	
Club	Season	Apps	Goals	Apps	Goals	Apps	Goals	Apps	Goals
IF Brommapojkarna	2006	13	2	0	0	—		13	2
IF Brommapojkarna	2007	15	1	0	0	—		15	1
IF Brommapojkarna	2008	15	4	0	0	—		15	4
IF Brommapojkarna	2009	28	7	1	0	—		29	7
IF Brommapojkarna	Total	71	14	1	0	0	0	72	14
Heerenveen	2009–10	12	0	0	0	—		12	0
Heerenveen	2010–11	13	1	1	0	—		14	1
Heerenveen	Total	25	1	1	0	0	0	26	1
IFK Göteborg	2011	10	1	1	0	—		11	1
IFK Göteborg	2012	24	0	0	0	—		24	0
IFK Göteborg	2013	28	7	6	1	2	1	36	9
IFK Göteborg	2014	7	0	3	1	0	0	10	1
IFK Göteborg	Total	69	8	10	2	2	1	81	11
Hammarby IF	2015	26	0	0	0	—		26	0
Hammarby IF	2016	23	3	4	1	—		27	4
Hammarby IF	Total	49	3	4	1	0	0	53	4
Career total		214	26	16	3	2	1	232	30

== Honours ==
IFK Göteborg

- Svenska Cupen: 2012–13
