= Johan Persson (footballer) =

Swedish footballer (born 1984)

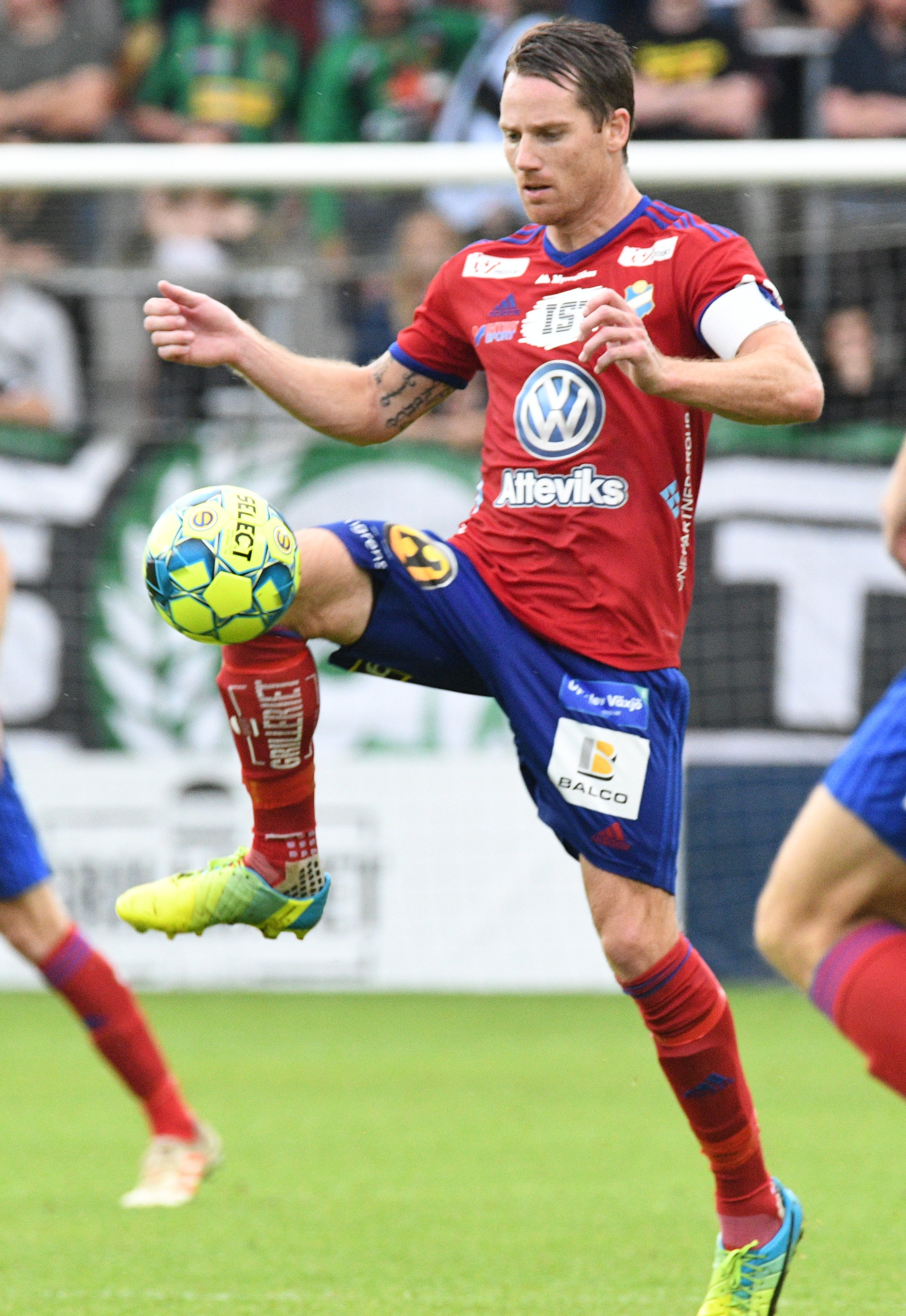
- Persson playing for Östers IF in 2019

Personal information
- Full name: Hans Johan Oskar Persson
- Date of birth: 20 June 1984 (age 42)
- Place of birth: Sweden
- Height: 1.83 m (6 ft 0 in)
- Position: Midfielder

Youth career
- Tollarps IF

Senior career*
Years	Team	Apps	(Gls)
2003–2005	IFK Hässleholm		
2006–2007	Mjällby AIF	55	(5)
2008–2010	Landskrona BoIS	81	(10)
2011	Esbjerg fB	4	(0)
2011–2013	Östers IF	40	(4)
2013–2017	Hammarby IF	82	(4)
2017–2019	Helsingborgs IF	20	(1)
2019–2020	Östers IF	34	(1)
- * Club domestic league appearances and goals

Johan "Sheriffen" Persson (born 20 June 1984) is a Swedish former footballer who played as a midfielder.

== Career ==
He began his senior career at the Scanian club IFK Hässleholm in the lower divisions, before getting signed by Mjällby AIF in 2006.

Two years later he made a switch to Landskrona BoIS in the Swedish second tier, Superettan. Acting as a regular starter on the defensive midfield he made 81 appearances for the side during the following three seasons, managing to score on 10 occasions.

In the off season of 2010 he moved abroad for the first time in his career, signing with Esbjerg fB in the Danish Superliga. But Persson failed to make an impact at the team and left by mutual consent a few months later, having played only 6 league games, when his short term-contract ended.

He then returned to his native country, signing a long term-deal with Östers IF on 17 July 2011. Persson would remain at the club for another few years being a part of a promotion campaign to Allsvenskan in 2012. During these successful years he was nicknamed as "Sheriffen" (the sheriff) by then manager Roar Hansen.

When Öster got relegated from the 2013 Allsvenskan, after a short stint in the highest division, Persson instead moved to the Stockholm-based club Hammarby IF in Superettan. Once again he would enjoy an immediate promotion to Allsvenskan, also establishing himself as the vice captain of the club.

During the 2015 and 2016 season he appeared as a regular starter for Hammarby in Allsvenskan. He has also renewed his tie to the club, signing a new contract that will last until the summer of 2018.

On 30 June, midway through the 2017 season, Persson and Hammarby chose to part separate ways. Persson opted to live closer to his family and cited "personal reasons" for his departure. In total, Persson made 82 league appearances for Hammarby, scoring 4 goals.

Persson signed a two-and-a-half-year contract with Helsingborgs IF on 5 July 2017.
