= Fredric Fendrich =

Swedish footballer

Personal information
- Full name: Fredric Willy Fendrich
- Date of birth: 27 January 1988 (age 38)
- Place of birth: Jönköping, Sweden
- Position: Midfielder

Team information
- Current team: Jönköpings Södra
- Number: 5

Youth career
- 2003: Jönköpings Södra

Senior career*
Years	Team	Apps	(Gls)
2004–2022	Jönköpings Södra	435	(11)
- * Club domestic league appearances and goals as of 7 November 2022 (UTC)

Fredric Fendrich (born 27 January 1988) is a Swedish footballer who played as a midfielder for Jönköpings Södra his entire career.

== Career ==
Fendrich started his career with Jönköpings Södra and made his first team debut in 2004 and in 2006 he made his debut in the professional divisions in Sweden.

In November 2022, he ended his 23-year old visit at the club.
