= Adam Eriksson (footballer, born 1990) =

Swedish footballer (born 1990)

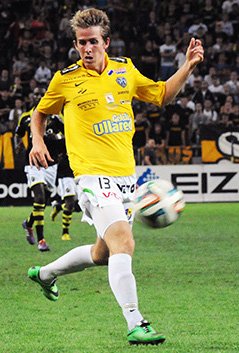

Personal information
- Full name: Adam Lars Eriksson
- Date of birth: 13 July 1990 (age 36)
- Place of birth: Borås, Sweden
- Height: 1.86 m (6 ft 1 in)
- Position: Defender

Youth career
- Sparsörs AIK
- IF Elfsborg

Senior career*
Years	Team	Apps	(Gls)
2009–2011	Norrby IF	70	(4)
2012–2015	Falkenbergs FF	102	(3)
2016–2021	Helsingborgs IF	143	(1)
2021–2023	Falkenbergs FF	70	(1)
- * Club domestic league appearances and goals as of 30 November 2023

Adam Lars Eriksson (born 13 July 1990) is a Swedish retired footballer who plays for Falkenbergs FF as a defender.

He signed for Helsingborgs IF from Falkenbergs FF before the start of the 2016 season.
