= David Boo Wiklander =

Colombian-born Swedish footballer

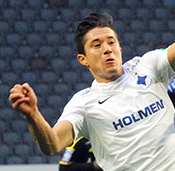

Personal information
- Full name: Nils David Casper; Boo Wiklander
- Date of birth: 3 October 1984 (age 42)
- Place of birth: Bogotá, Colombia
- Height: 1.80 m (5 ft 11 in)
- Position: Defender

Youth career
- Qviding FIF
- IFK Göteborg

Senior career*
| Years | Team | Apps | (Gls) |
| 2003 | IFK Göteborg | 0 | (0) |
| 2004–2009 | Qviding FIF | 79 | (1) |
| 2010–2015 | IFK Norrköping | 139 | (1) |
| 2016 | Hammarby IF | 13 | (0) |
| 2017–2018 | IFK Göteborg | 39 | (1) |
| Total | | 270 | (3) |
- * Club domestic league appearances and goals

David Boo Wiklander (born 3 October 1984) is a Swedish former footballer who played as a defender.

== Personal life ==
Boo Wiklander was born in Colombia. When he was a few months old he was adopted to Sweden where he grew up.

== Honours ==
IFK Norrköping

- Allsvenskan: 2015
