= 2008 Allsvenskan =

84th season of Allsvenskan

Allsvenskan
- Season: 2008
- Champions: Kalmar FF; 1st Allsvenskan title 1st Swedish championship title
- Relegated: GIF Sundsvall; IFK Norrköping; Ljungskile SK (via playoffs)
- Champions League: Kalmar FF
- Europa League: IF Elfsborg; IFK Göteborg; Helsingborgs IF
- Matches: 240
- Goals: 637 (2.65 per match)
- Top goalscorer: Patrik Ingelsten (19)
- Biggest home win: Kalmar FF 6–0 IFK Norrköping (2 November 2008); Malmö FF 6–0 GIF Sundsvall (9 November 2008)
- Biggest away win: GIF Sundsvall 0-5 IFK Göteborg (29 September 2008)
- Highest scoring: Hammarby 3–6 Malmö FF (3 November 2008)
- Highest attendance: 34,173; AIK 1–1 Djurgården (24 April 2008)
- Lowest attendance: 1,427; Trelleborgs FF 2–0 GIF Sundsvall (22 September 2008)
- Average attendance: 7,787

Allsvenskan 2008, part of the 2008 Swedish football season, was the 84th Allsvenskan season played. The first match was played on 30 March 2008 and the last matches were played on 9 November 2008.

Kalmar FF won their first Swedish championship title. It was also the first title for a team from the province of Småland for 27 years.

== Participating clubs ==
Locations of the 2008 Allsvenskan teams

Club	Last season	First season in league	First season of current spell
AIK	5th	1924–25	2006
Djurgårdens IF	3rd	1927–28	2001
IF Elfsborg	4th	1926–27	1997
GAIS	11th	1924–25	2006
Gefle IF	10th	1933–34	2005
IFK Göteborg	1st	1924–25	1977
Halmstads BK	7th	1933–34	1993
Hammarby IF	6th	1924–25	1998
Helsingborgs IF	8th	1924–25	1993
Kalmar FF	2nd	1949–50	2004
Ljungskile SK	2nd (Superettan)	1997	2008
Malmö FF	9th	1931–32	2001
IFK Norrköping	1st (Superettan)	1924–25	2008
GIF Sundsvall	3rd (Superettan)	1965	2008
Trelleborgs FF	13th	1985	2007
Örebro SK	12th	1946–47	2007

== Managers ==
Club	Coach
AIK	(Sweden) Rikard Norling
Djurgårdens IF	(Iceland) Sigurður Jónsson
IF Elfsborg	(Sweden) Magnus Haglund
GAIS	(Sweden) Magnus Pehrsson
Gefle IF	(Sweden) Per Olsson
IFK Göteborg	(Sweden) Stefan Rehn/ (Sweden) Jonas Olsson
Halmstads BK	(Sweden) Janne Andersson
Hammarby IF	(Sweden) Tony Gustavsson
Helsingborgs IF	(Sweden) Bosse Nilsson
Kalmar FF	(Sweden) Nanne Bergstrand
Ljungskile SK	(England) David Wilson
Malmö FF	(Sweden) Roland Nilsson
IFK Norrköping	(Sweden) Sören Cratz
GIF Sundsvall	(Sweden) Sören Åkeby
Trelleborgs FF	(Sweden) Tom Prahl
Örebro SK	(Finland) Sixten Boström

== League table ==
Pos	Team	Pld	W	D	L	GF	GA	GD	Pts	Qualification or relegation
1	Kalmar FF (C)	30	20	4	6	70	32	+38	64	Qualification to Champions League second qualifying round
2	IF Elfsborg	30	19	6	5	49	18	+31	63	Qualification to Europa League second qualifying round
3	IFK Göteborg	30	15	9	6	50	26	+24	54	Qualification to Europa League third qualifying round (Note: IFK Göteborg qualified for the Third qualifying round of the UEFA Europa League as Svenska Cupen champions 2008.)
4	Helsingborgs IF	30	16	6	8	54	41	+13	54	Qualification to Europa League first qualifying round (Note: Helsingborg qualified for the UEFA Europa League as they received IFK Göteborg's initial qualifying spot.)
5	AIK	30	12	9	9	36	32	+4	45	
6	Malmö FF	30	12	8	10	51	46	+5	44	
7	Örebro SK	30	11	9	10	36	39	−3	42	
8	Halmstads BK	30	11	8	11	41	38	+3	41	
9	Hammarby IF	30	11	8	11	44	51	−7	41	
10	Trelleborgs FF	30	9	13	8	33	31	+2	40	
11	GAIS	30	9	11	10	30	36	−6	38	
12	Djurgårdens IF	30	9	9	12	30	41	−11	36	
13	Gefle IF	30	7	7	16	33	42	−9	28	
14	Ljungskile SK (R)	30	6	6	18	23	52	−29	24	Qualification to Relegation play-offs
15	GIF Sundsvall (R)	30	5	7	18	26	54	−28	22	Relegation to Superettan
16	IFK Norrköping (R)	30	4	8	18	31	58	−27	20	Relegation to Superettan

Source: svenskfotboll.se (in Swedish)
Rules for classification: 1) points; 2) goal difference; 3) number of goals scored.
(C) Champions; (R) Relegated

== Results ==
Home \ Away	AIK	DIF	IFE	GAI	GIF	IFKG	HBK	HAM	HIF	KFF	LSK	MFF	IFKN	GIFS	TFF	ÖSK
AIK		1–1	0–2	2–2	1–1	0–0	1–0	2–2	3–1	0–0	1–0	2–0	2–0	1–0	1–0	2–1
Djurgårdens IF	1–1		0–2	0–0	2–0	1–2	2–1	0–2	1–2	0–1	2–1	1–1	1–1	3–1	1–3	0–0
IF Elfsborg	3–0	1–0		1–0	0–1	3–0	3–0	1–0	1–0	1–0	4–0	4–0	3–0	2–0	4–1	0–0
GAIS	0–2	2–1	1–1		2–0	0–0	0–4	2–0	0–3	1–4	3–1	2–2	0–0	0–2	0–0	3–0
Gefle IF	0–1	1–2	1–2	0–0		0–1	4–0	3–0	3–0	1–5	1–1	1–2	2–0	2–0	0–1	0–1
IFK Göteborg	2–0	3–1	5–2	0–1	3–0		3–0	2–0	1–1	3–2	0–0	2–0	4–0	1–0	0–2	4–1
Halmstads BK	2–1	1–2	1–2	0–0	1–0	1–1		1–1	3–1	2–2	3–2	2–3	2–0	0–0	0–0	1–2
Hammarby IF	1–1	3–0	0–0	2–4	2–1	0–0	2–1		2–1	1–2	2–2	3–6	4–3	5–3	0–0	1–0
Helsingborgs IF	2–1	2–0	2–2	1–0	2–2	2–1	1–1	5–1		1–0	0–1	4–2	2–2	2–1	1–1	1–0
Kalmar FF	3–2	5–1	2–1	4–0	3–1	0–1	1–1	1–0	4–2		3–1	3–2	6–0	3–0	1–0	2–2
Ljungskile SK	2–1	0–1	1–0	0–3	0–0	2–1	0–3	0–1	0–2	2–4		1–3	0–2	2–0	0–0	0–1
Malmö FF	1–0	1–2	1–1	1–1	2–0	1–1	0–3	2–4	1–2	3–2	2–1		2–1	6–0	1–1	3–1
IFK Norrköping	1–2	1–2	0–1	0–1	2–1	2–2	1–3	5–2	3–4	1–3	1–1	1–0		0–2	1–1	0–0
GIF Sundsvall	1–1	0–0	0–0	1–1	2–3	0–5	2–1	1–2	0–3	0–2	4–0	0–0	2–1		2–2	1–2
Trelleborgs FF	2–0	1–1	0–2	3–1	3–3	0–0	1–2	1–0	1–3	2–1	1–2	0–0	1–0	2–0		3–3
Örebro SK	1–4	1–1	2–0	1–0	1–1	4–2	0–1	1–1	3–1	0–1	3–0	0–3	2–2	2–1	1–0	

Source: Swedish Football Association (in Swedish)
Legend: Blue = home team win; Yellow = draw; Red = away team win.

== Relegation play-offs ==
13 November 2008
19:00

Brommapojkarna	0–0	Ljungskile
	Report

Grimsta IP, Stockholm
Attendance: 2,072
Referee: Markus Strömbergsson (Gävle)

16 November 2008
15:00

Ljungskile	1–1	Brommapojkarna
Wålemark 48'	Report	Haglund 45+3'

H.A. Bygg Arena, Ljungskile
Attendance: 2,828
Referee: Daniel Stålhammar (Landskrona)

1–1 on aggregate. Brommapojkarna won on away goals.

== Top scorers ==
Rank	Player	Club	Goals
1	(Sweden) Patrik Ingelsten	Kalmar FF	19
2	(Brazil) Anselmo	Halmstads BK	15
2	(Sweden) Viktor Elm	Kalmar FF	15
4	(United States) Charlie Davies	Hammarby IF	14
4	(Sweden) Henrik Larsson	Helsingborgs IF	14
4	(Sweden) Ola Toivonen	Malmö FF	14
7	(Sweden) Hans Berggren	Gefle IF	11
8	(Argentina) Iván Óbolo	AIK	10

== Attendances ==
No.	Club	Average attendance	Highest attendance
1	AIK	15,535	34,173
2	Malmö FF	11,194	18,884
3	Hammarby IF	11,144	23,578
4	Helsingborgs IF	10,497	16,704
5	Djurgårdens IF	10,169	22,312
6	IFK Göteborg	9,632	29,801
7	IF Elfsborg	9,513	16,599
8	Örebro SK	8,660	10,606
9	IFK Norrköping	6,652	15,651
10	Kalmar FF	6,103	9,689
11	Halmstads BK	6,033	10,309
12	GAIS	5,225	27,238
13	GIF Sundsvall	4,597	6,275
14	Gefle IF	3,918	5,060
15	Ljungskile SK	2,932	7,128
16	Trelleborgs FF	2,794	6,748
