= 2016 Allsvenskan =

92nd season of Allsvenskan

Allsvenskan
- Season: 2016
- Champions: Malmö FF; 22nd Allsvenskan title 19th Swedish title
- Relegated: Helsingborgs IF; Gefle IF; Falkenbergs FF
- Champions League: Malmö FF
- Europa League: AIK; IFK Norrköping; Östersunds FK, via cup
- Matches: 240
- Goals: 737 (3.07 per match)
- Top goalscorer: John Owoeri (17 goals)
- Biggest home win: BK Häcken 7–0 Falkenbergs FF (6 Nov 2016)
- Biggest away win: Falkenbergs FF 0–5 Jönköpings Södra IF (6 Aug 2016)
- Highest scoring: Gefle IF 2–6 IFK Göteborg (2 May 2016)
- Longest winning run: 5 matches Malmö FF
- Longest unbeaten run: 18 matches IFK Norrköping
- Longest winless run: 17 matches Falkenbergs FF
- Longest losing run: 8 matches Gefle IF
- Highest attendance: 31,756; Hammarby IF 1–1 Östersunds FK (4 April 2016)
- Lowest attendance: 1,424; BK Häcken 6–1 Gefle IF (28 April 2016)
- Average attendance: 9,184
- All statistics correct as of 6 November 2016.

The 2016 Allsvenskan season was the 92nd edition of top tier Allsvenskan football competition since its founding in 1924 under the authority of the Swedish Football Association in Sweden; the 2016 Swedish football season. The season started on 2 April 2016 and ended in November 2016. 16 teams contested. The fixtures were released on 9 December 2015 and it included a match between the two most recent champions IFK Norrköping and Malmö FF (in Malmö) as the opening game, a revisit of their 2015 final match.

IFK Norrköping unsuccessfully defended its 2015 title. Malmö FF successfully defended its away pursuit of their 22nd title on 26 October 2016 in the 2016 final defeating Falkenbergs FF at Falkenbergs IP, 3-0 this season; and their 19th Swedish championship overall.

== Summary ==
=== Allsvenskans stora pris ===
For the fourth consecutive year, the broadcaster of Allsvenskan, C More Entertainment, hosted on 17 November 2016 an award ceremony where players and staff of the 16 Allsvenskan clubs were presented seven awards and two special awards. The nominations for the 2016 season were officially announced on 11 November 2016. Nominees are displayed below, the winners are marked in bold text. Malmö FF received the most nominations with seven nominations while IFK Norrköping received four nominations, and AIK and IF Elfsborg received two nominations. Djurgårdens IF, Falkenbergs FF and IFK Göteborg received one nomination each.

Goalkeeper of the year

- **Johan Wiland** (Malmö FF)
- Patrik Carlgren (AIK)
- Kevin Stuhr Ellegaard (IF Elfsborg)

Defender of the year

- **Andreas Johansson** (IFK Norrköping)
- Emil Salomonsson (IFK Göteborg)
- Kári Árnason (Malmö FF)

Midfielder of the year

- **Magnus Wolff Eikrem** (Malmö FF)
- Anders Christiansen (Malmö FF)
- Viktor Claesson (IF Elfsborg)

Forward of the year

- **Viðar Örn Kjartansson** (Malmö FF)
- Christoffer Nyman (IFK Norrköping)
- Sebastian Andersson (IFK Norrköping)

Newcomer of the year

- **Alexander Isak** (AIK)
- Jesper Karlsson (Falkenbergs FF)
- Michael Olunga (Djurgårdens IF)

Manager of the year

- **Graham Potter** (Östersunds FK)
- Rikard Norling (AIK)
- Allan Kuhn (Malmö FF)

Most valuable player of the year

- **Andreas Johansson** (IFK Norrköping)
- Magnus Wolff Eikrem (Malmö FF)
- Viktor Claesson (IF Elfsborg)

== Suspended matches ==
=== IFK Göteborg vs. Malmö FF ===
The match at Gamla Ullevi between IFK Göteborg and Malmö FF on 27 April 2016 was abandoned after 77 minutes of play. A firecracker was thrown towards former IFK Göteborg player Tobias Sana from the home section. On 4 May, the Swedish Football Association's disciplinary committee decided that the match would not continue and that the final score would be 0–3.

=== Jönköpings Södra IF vs. Östersunds FK ===
The match at Stadsparksvallen between Jönköpings Södra IF and Östersunds FK on 15 August 2016 was abandoned after 90 minutes of play. A spectator invaded the pitch and attacked Östersund's goalkeeper Aly Keita. Keita was advised by team physicians to not finish the game. On 25 August, the Swedish Football Association's disciplinary committee decided that the match would not continue and that the final score would be 0–3. However, the decision was overturned on 27 September and the final score would be 1–1.

== Teams ==
Location of teams in 2016 Allsvenskan

A total of sixteen teams are contesting the league, including fourteen sides from the 2015 season and two promoted teams from the 2015 Superettan. Both of the promoted teams for the 2015 season managed to stay in the league, Hammarby IF and GIF Sundsvall.

Halmstads BK and Åtvidabergs FF were relegated at the end of the 2015 season after finishing in the bottom two places of the table. They were replaced by 2015 Superettan champions Jönköpings Södra IF and runners-up Östersunds FK. Jönköpings Södra IF returned to Allsvenskan after 46 years' absence, having been relegated at the end of the 1969 season. This is Jönköpings Södra's 11th season in the league. Östersunds FK are participating in the league for the first time in the club's history; they are the first new club in Allsvenskan's history since Falkenbergs FF in 2014.

Falkenbergs FF as 14th-placed team retained their Allsvenskan spot after winning against third-placed Superettan team IK Sirius 3–3 (away goals) on aggregate in a relegation/promotion playoff.

=== Stadia and locations ===
Team	Location	Stadium	Turf^{1}	Stadium capacity^{1}
AIK	Stockholm	Friends Arena	Natural	50,000
BK Häcken	Gothenburg	Bravida Arena	Artificial	6,500
Djurgårdens IF	Stockholm	Tele2 Arena	Artificial	30,000
Falkenbergs FF	Falkenberg	Falkenbergs IP	Natural	4,000
Gefle IF	Gävle	Gavlevallen	Artificial	6,500
GIF Sundsvall	Sundsvall	Norrporten Arena	Artificial	7,700
Hammarby IF	Stockholm	Tele2 Arena	Artificial	30,000
Helsingborgs IF	Helsingborg	Olympia	Natural	16,500
IF Elfsborg	Borås	Borås Arena	Artificial	16,899
IFK Göteborg	Gothenburg	Gamla Ullevi	Natural	18,600
IFK Norrköping	Norrköping	Nya Parken	Artificial	15,734
Jönköpings Södra IF	Jönköping	Stadsparksvallen	Natural	5,500
Kalmar FF	Kalmar	Guldfågeln Arena	Natural	12,000
Malmö FF	Malmö	Swedbank Stadion	Natural	24,000
Örebro SK	Örebro	Behrn Arena	Artificial	12,300
Östersunds FK	Östersund	Jämtkraft Arena	Artificial	6,626

- ^{1} According to each club information page at the Swedish Football Association website for Allsvenskan.

=== Personnel and kits ===
Note: Flags indicate national team as has been defined under FIFA eligibility rules. Players and Managers may hold more than one non-FIFA nationality.

Team	Head coach^{1}	Captain	Kit manufacturer	Main shirt sponsor
AIK	(Sweden) Rikard Norling	(Sweden) Nils-Eric Johansson	Adidas	Åbro
BK Häcken	(Sweden) Peter Gerhardsson	(Sweden) Martin Ericsson	Nike	BRA Bygg
Djurgårdens IF	(England) Mark Dempsey	(Sweden) Kevin Walker	Adidas	Prioritet Finans
Falkenbergs FF	(Sweden) Hans Eklund	(Sweden) David Svensson	Nike	Gekås Ullared
Gefle IF	(Sweden) Thomas Andersson	(Sweden) Anders Bååth	Umbro	Various
GIF Sundsvall	(Sweden) Joel Cedergren	(Sweden) Tommy Naurin	Adidas	Various
Hammarby IF	(Sweden) Nanne Bergstrand	(Sweden) Kennedy Bakircioglu	Puma	LW
Helsingborgs IF	(Sweden) Henrik Larsson	(Sweden) Peter Larsson	Puma	Resurs Bank
IF Elfsborg	(Sweden) Magnus Haglund	(Denmark) Kevin Stuhr Ellegaard	Umbro	Various
IFK Göteborg	(Sweden) Jörgen Lennartsson	(Sweden) Mattias Bjärsmyr	Kappa	Prioritet Finans
IFK Norrköping	(Sweden) Jens Gustafsson	(Sweden) Andreas Johansson	Nike	Holmen
Jönköpings Södra IF	(Sweden) Jimmy Thelin	(Sweden) Tommy Thelin	Nike	Various
Kalmar FF	(Sweden) Peter Swärdh	(Sweden) Rasmus Elm	Hummel	Hjältevadshus
Malmö FF	(Denmark) Allan Kuhn	(Sweden) Markus Rosenberg	Puma	Volkswagen
Örebro SK	(Sweden) Alexander Axén	(Sweden) Robert Åhman Persson	Puma	None
Östersunds FK	(England) Graham Potter	(Montserrat) Alex Dyer	Adidas	Östersund Municipality

- ^{1} According to each club information page at the Swedish Football Association website for Allsvenskan.

=== Managerial changes ===
Team	Outgoing manager	Manner of departure	Date of vacancy	Table	Incoming manager	Date of appointment
Malmö FF	(Norway) Åge Hareide	Resigned	2 December 2015	Pre-season	(Denmark) Allan Kuhn	8 January 2016
AIK	(Sweden) Andreas Alm	Sacked	13 May 2016	9th	(Sweden) Rikard Norling	13 May 2016
IFK Norrköping	(Sweden) Janne Andersson	Resigned	29 May 2016	2nd	(Sweden) Jens Gustafsson	1 June 2016
Gefle IF	(Sweden) Roger Sandberg	Sacked	2 June 2016	15th	(Sweden) Thomas Andersson	2 June 2016
Djurgården IF	(Sweden) Pelle Olsson	Sacked	3 August 2016	14th	(England) Mark Dempsey	3 August 2016
GIF Sundsvall	(Sweden) Roger Franzén	Sacked	17 September 2016	13th	(Sweden) Joel Cedergren	17 September 2016

== League table ==
Pos	Team	Pld	W	D	L	GF	GA	GD	Pts	Qualification or relegation
1	Malmö FF (C)	30	21	3	6	60	26	+34	66	Qualification for the Champions League second qualifying round
2	AIK	30	17	9	4	52	26	+26	60	Qualification for the Europa League first qualifying round
3	IFK Norrköping	30	18	6	6	59	37	+22	60	Qualification for the Europa League first qualifying round
4	IFK Göteborg	30	14	8	8	56	47	+9	50	
5	IF Elfsborg	30	13	9	8	58	38	+20	48	
6	Kalmar FF	30	12	8	10	45	40	+5	44	
7	Djurgårdens IF	30	14	1	15	48	47	+1	43	
8	Östersunds FK	30	12	6	12	44	46	−2	42	Qualification for the Europa League second qualifying round (Note: Östersunds FK qualified for the Europa League second qualifying round by winning the 2016–17 Svenska Cupen.)
9	Örebro SK	30	11	8	11	48	51	−3	41	
10	BK Häcken	30	11	7	12	58	45	+13	40	
11	Hammarby IF	30	10	9	11	46	49	−3	39	
12	Jönköpings Södra IF	30	8	11	11	32	39	−7	35	
13	GIF Sundsvall	30	7	9	14	38	54	−16	30	
14	Helsingborgs IF (R)	30	8	5	17	34	52	−18	29	Qualification for the relegation play-offs
15	Gefle IF (R)	30	6	9	15	34	56	−22	27	Relegation to the Superettan
16	Falkenbergs FF (R)	30	2	4	24	25	84	−59	10	Relegation to the Superettan

Source: svenskfotboll.se (in Swedish)
Rules for classification: 1) Points; 2) Goal difference; 3) Goals scored; 4) Head-to-head points; 5) Head-to-head goal difference; 6) Head-to-head away goals scored; 7) Play-off
(Note: Play-off is only played if need to decide champion, teams for relegation or UEFA competition and will be played on a neutral ground).
(C) Champions; (R) Relegated

== Positions by round ==
Team ╲ Round	1	2	3	4	5	6	7	8	9	10	11	12	13	14	15	16	17	18	19	20	21	22	23	24	25	26	27	28	29	30
Malmö FF	1	7	12	8	5	2	2	2	2	2	1	1	1	1	1	1	1	1	1	1	1	2	2	1	1	1	1	1	1	1
AIK	9	4	6	10	9	9	11	9	4	4	4	4	5	5	5	3	3	3	3	3	3	3	3	3	3	2	3	2	2	2
IFK Norrköping	14	8	3	2	4	1	1	1	1	1	2	2	2	2	2	2	2	2	2	2	2	1	1	2	2	3	2	3	3	3
IFK Göteborg	3	2	2	4	8	10	7	5	6	6	6	5	3	3	3	4	4	4	4	4	4	4	4	4	4	4	4	4	4	4
IF Elfsborg	12	6	11	14	14	12	9	7	10	5	7	7	6	6	6	6	7	7	6	7	7	6	7	8	8	6	5	5	5	5
Kalmar FF	13	15	14	12	13	14	12	13	14	12	13	9	10	12	10	9	11	11	9	11	10	10	8	7	5	7	6	6	6	6
Östersunds FK	8	13	10	7	10	11	13	11	7	8	10	13	9	9	9	10	8	8	8	8	8	8	9	11	11	11	10	8	7	8
Örebro SK	16	9	4	9	6	3	6	4	3	3	3	3	4	4	4	5	6	5	5	5	5	5	6	6	7	5	7	7	8	9
Djurgårdens IF	2	1	1	1	3	7	3	8	11	13	8	10	11	13	13	14	14	13	13	13	12	11	12	10	10	10	11	11	9	7
Hammarby IF	11	14	7	5	7	8	10	12	12	14	14	14	14	14	14	13	12	12	10	10	9	9	10	9	9	8	8	9	10	11
BK Häcken	4	10	13	15	15	13	14	14	13	11	12	8	7	7	7	7	5	6	7	6	6	7	5	5	6	9	9	10	11	10
Jönköpings Södra IF	5	3	5	3	2	5	5	10	9	10	11	11	12	10	11	11	9	9	11	9	11	12	11	12	12	12	12	12	12	12
GIF Sundsvall	6	11	9	6	1	4	4	3	5	7	5	6	8	8	8	8	10	10	12	12	13	13	13	13	13	13	13	13	13	13
Helsingborgs IF	7	12	15	13	11	6	8	6	8	9	9	12	13	11	12	12	13	14	14	14	14	14	14	14	14	14	14	14	14	14
Gefle IF	10	5	8	11	12	15	15	15	15	15	15	15	16	16	16	16	15	15	15	15	15	15	15	15	15	15	15	15	15	15
Falkenbergs FF	15	16	16	16	16	16	16	16	16	16	16	16	15	15	15	15	16	16	16	16	16	16	16	16	16	16	16	16	16	16

Leader
2017–18 UEFA Europa League First qualifying round
Relegation play-offs
Relegation to 2017 Superettan

Source: everysport.com

== Results ==
Home \ Away	AIK	BKH	DIF	FFF	GIF	GIFS	HAM	HIF	IFE	IFKG	IFKN	JSIF	KFF	MFF	ÖSK	ÖFK
AIK		2–1	2–0	2–0	1–0	1–1	0–0	2–1	2–1	3–3	6–0	0–0	3–1	1–1	0–0	2–0
BK Häcken	2–3		3–1	7–0	6–1	0–1	4–2	1–1	2–1	2–2	1–2	3–1	2–3	2–4	0–1	3–1
Djurgårdens IF	0–3	1–0		5–0	2–1	1–3	1–3	3–0	2–2	3–1	0–1	0–2	0–3	3–1	3–2	3–0
Falkenbergs FF	2–3	1–4	1–2		1–1	1–1	0–2	1–4	1–2	0–2	2–1	0–5	1–2	0–3	1–3	1–2
Gefle IF	0–1	2–2	1–2	1–2		1–1	0–2	1–1	2–2	2–6	0–0	0–1	4–2	1–0	0–4	0–0
GIF Sundsvall	1–3	0–0	2–5	2–1	1–2		0–0	0–2	1–3	1–3	1–2	3–1	1–1	0–1	3–1	5–0
Hammarby IF	0–3	2–3	4–2	3–3	2–1	1–1		5–1	2–4	2–0	1–1	1–1	2–1	2–3	1–1	1–1
Helsingborgs IF	2–1	0–2	1–2	3–1	2–3	2–1	0–1		2–4	1–3	1–2	2–0	0–1	2–1	1–3	1–1
IF Elfsborg	2–2	2–4	3–0	5–0	2–0	4–0	4–1	1–0		1–1	2–1	3–3	1–1	0–1	2–1	3–1
IFK Göteborg	1–0	1–0	2–1	2–0	3–3	4–1	2–0	2–1	2–2		1–1	2–1	1–1	0–3	3–2	2–0
IFK Norrköping	4–1	3–1	1–3	2–1	2–0	3–1	3–1	3–0	0–0	3–1		5–1	4–1	1–2	3–1	3–3
Jönköpings Södra IF	0–0	1–1	1–0	1–1	1–0	1–1	0–1	1–1	1–0	1–1	0–2		0–1	3–2	1–1	1–1
Kalmar FF	1–1	1–1	2–1	3–0	0–1	2–0	1–1	2–3	3–2	4–2	0–1	0–1		1–1	3–2	2–0
Malmö FF	2–0	3–0	1–0	2–0	3–0	1–2	3–0	2–0	1–0	3–1	3–1	4–1	1–1		1–0	0–3
Örebro SK	0–2	0–0	0–2	3–2	2–2	3–3	3–2	0–0	1–0	3–2	2–2	2–1	2–1	0–3		1–5
Östersunds FK	0–2	2–1	1–0	6–1	2–4	4–0	2–0	2–0	0–0	2–0	0–2	1–0	1–0	1–4	2–4	

Source: Swedish Football Association (in Swedish)
Legend: Blue = home team win; Yellow = draw; Red = away team win.

== Play-offs ==
The 14th-placed team of Allsvenskan meets the third-placed team from 2016 Superettan in a two-legged tie on a home-and-away basis with the team from Allsvenskan finishing at home.

17 November 2016
18:30

Halmstads BK	1–1	Helsingborgs IF
Helstrup 85' (o.g.)	Report	Eriksson 74'

Örjans Vall, Halmstad
Attendance: 6,104
Referee: Jonas Eriksson (Sigtuna)

20 November 2016
13:30

Helsingborgs IF	1–2	Halmstads BK
J. Larsson 82'	Report	Mathisen 87' (pen.), 90'

Olympia, Helsingborg
Attendance: 11,074
Referee: Stefan Johannesson (Täby)

Halmstads BK won 3–2 on aggregate.

== Season statistics ==
=== Top scorers ===
As of 6 November 2016

Rank	Player	Club	Goals
1	(Nigeria) John Owoeri	BK Häcken	17
2	(Sweden) Sebastian Andersson	IFK Norrköping	14
2	(Iceland) Viðar Örn Kjartansson	Malmö FF	14
4	(Sweden) Viktor Prodell	IF Elfsborg	13
5	(Kenya) Michael Olunga	Djurgårdens IF	12

=== Top goalkeepers ===
As of 6 November 2016
(Minimum of 10 games played)

Rank	Goalkeeper	Club	GP	GA	SV%	CS
1	(Estonia) Andreas Vaikla	IFK Norrköping	13	12	79	5
2	(Sweden) Patrik Carlgren	AIK	28	24	78	14
3	(Sweden) Johan Wiland	Malmö FF	28	25	76	13
4	(Sweden) Andreas Andersson	Gefle IF	22	32	74	4
4	(Sweden) Jacob Rinne	Örebro SK	12	21	74	2
6	(Sweden) John Alvbåge	IFK Göteborg	29	41	73	7
6	(Sweden) Tommy Naurin	GIF Sundsvall	30	54	73	4
6	(Sweden) Peter Abrahamsson	BK Häcken	29	45	73	3
9	(Denmark) Kevin Stuhr Ellegaard	IF Elfsborg	30	38	72	7

=== Hat-tricks ===
Player	For	Against	Result	Date
(Sweden) Erik Israelsson	Hammarby IF	Helsingborgs IF	5–1	10 April 2016
(Iceland) Viðar Örn Kjartansson	Malmö FF	BK Häcken	3–0	1 May 2016
(Iceland) Viðar Örn Kjartansson	Malmö FF	Östersunds FK	1–4	28 May 2016
(Tunisia) Issam Jebali	IF Elfsborg	GIF Sundsvall	4–0	22 August 2016
(Sweden) Peter Wilson	GIF Sundsvall	Jönköpings Södra IF	3–1	1 October 2016
(Brazil) Rômulo	Hammarby IF	Djurgårdens IF	4–2	17 October 2016
(Nigeria) John Owoeri^{4}	BK Häcken	Falkenbergs FF	7–0	6 November 2016

Note

^{4} Player scored 4 goals

== See also ==
Competitions

- 2016 Superettan
- 2016 Division 1
- 2015–16 Svenska Cupen
- 2016–17 Svenska Cupen

Team seasons

- 2016 AIK Fotboll season
- 2016 Djurgårdens IF season
- 2016 Hammarby Fotboll season
- 2016 IFK Göteborg season
- 2016 IFK Norrköping season
- 2016 Malmö FF season
- 2016 Östersunds FK season

== Attendances ==
#	Club	Average attendance	Highest attendance
1	Hammarby IF	22,885	31,756
2	Malmö FF	17,841	21,719
3	AIK	16,431	30,843
4	Djurgårdens IF	13,393	24,900
5	IFK Göteborg	11,786	15,748
6	IFK Norrköping	10,449	15,940
7	IF Elfsborg	7,432	13,372
8	Örebro SK	7,396	11,407
9	Helsingborgs IF	7,377	11,065
10	Kalmar FF	6,229	10,189
11	Östersunds FK	5,914	8,208
12	Jönköpings Södra IF	4,973	6,321
13	GIF Sundsvall	4,495	7,462
14	Gefle IF	3,283	5,884
15	BK Häcken	3,213	6,380
16	Falkenbergs FF	2,928	5,326
