= Nanne Bergstrand =

Swedish footballer and manager

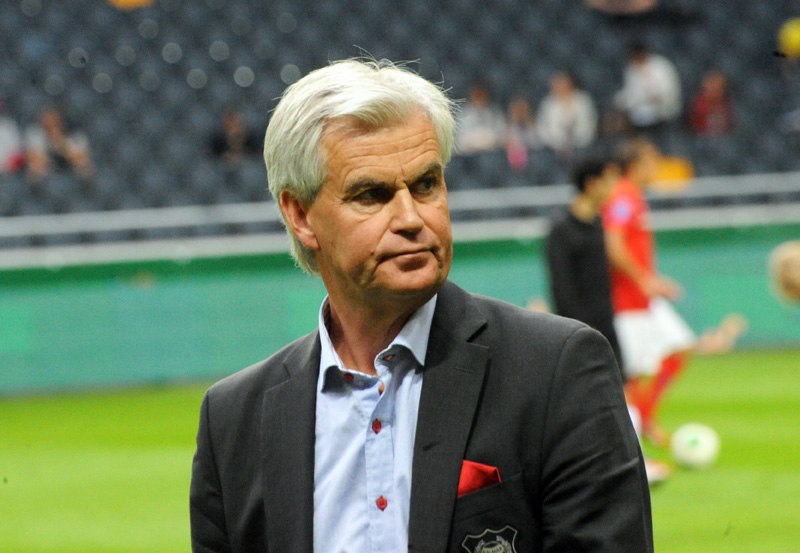
- Bergstrand in September 2013

Personal information
- Full name: Kurt Arne Nanne René Bergstrand
- Date of birth: 28 April 1956 (age 70)
- Place of birth: Markaryd, Sweden
- Height: 1.82 m (6 ft 0 in)
- Position: Forward

Senior career*
Years	Team	Apps	(Gls)
1972–1976	Markaryds IF		
1977–1978	Halmstads BK		
1979–1980	Markaryds IF		
1981–1982	Kalmar FF		
1983–1988	Markaryds IF		

Managerial career
- 1984: Traryds IF
- 1985–1991: Markaryds IF
- 1992–1993: Växjö Norra IF
- 1994–1996: Östers IF
- 1997: IK Oddevold
- 1998–1999: Kalmar FF
- 2000–2001: Helsingborgs IF
- 2002–2013: Kalmar FF
- 2014–2016: Hammarby IF
- 2017–2018: Kalmar FF
- 2020: Kalmar FF
- * Club domestic league appearances and goals

Kurt Arne "Nanne" René Bergstrand (born 28 April 1956) is a Swedish football manager and former football player. He has previously coached Helsingborgs IF, Östers IF, Kalmar FF and Hammarby IF in Allsvenskan.

His over ten-year tenure as manager of Kalmar FF made him the tenth longest-serving manager in European first-division football at the time according to UEFA. During the later years of his career at Kalmar FF he was sometimes referred to as the Swedish equivalent to Alex Ferguson.

== Playing career ==
A forward, Bergstrand started playing first team football at the age of 16 for the local small town club Markaryds IF. He had short spells at Allsvenskan clubs Halmstads BK and Kalmar FF as well as a trial with Manchester City in 1980, who were unable to sign him due to work permit issues. Players outside EEC had to play at international level to get a work permit. He ended up returning to his hometown club where he also took over as manager in 1985.

== Managerial career ==
During his time with Helsingborgs IF he helped the club qualify for the 2000–01 UEFA Champions League group stage after beating Inter Milan 1–0 on aggregate in the final qualifying round.

Most of his time as manager has been spent in charge of Kalmar FF who he has managed for a total of 590 games. The club had previously spent most of their existence in the second tier of Swedish football but with Bergstrand in charge they started getting top half finishes in the first tier Allsvenskan and eventually won the league for the first time ever in 2008. That same year he was voted "Manager of the year" in Sweden and had a street in Kalmar named after him.

Before the 2014 season, he signed a long term-deal with Hammarby IF from Stockholm. During his first season as manager, the team finished first in the Superettan-table, gaining promotion to Allsvenskan after a four-year stint in the second division.

He would guide the club to an 11th place in both the 2015 and 2016 season. However, Bergstrand was sacked as the manager of Hammarby on 18 November 2016, with the board citing "a need to get a new voice and new energy into the club's sporting development".

Bergstrand re-signed for Kalmar FF in June 2017.

Bergstrand currently holds the record for longest consecutive streak of managing an Allsvenskan club with 10 consecutive seasons with Kalmar FF during the years 2004 to 2013.

== Honours ==
=== Player ===
- Svenska Cupen: 1981

=== Manager ===
Kalmar FF

- Svenska Cupen: 2007
- Allsvenskan: 2008
- Svenska Supercupen: 2009

Hammarby

- Superettan: 2014
