= 2015–16 Svenska Cupen =

Tournament details
- Country: Sweden
- Dates: 9 June 2015 – 5 May 2016
- Teams: 112 (including qualifying); 96 (competition proper)

Final positions
- Champions: BK Häcken
- Runners-up: Malmö FF

Tournament statistics
- Matches played: 119
- Goals scored: 430 (3.61 per match)
- Top goal scorer(s): Jo Inge Berget; Paulinho (7 goals)

The 2015–16 Svenska Cupen will be the 60th season of Svenska Cupen and the fourth season with the current format. The winners of the competition will earn a place in the second qualifying round of the 2016–17 UEFA Europa League.

A total of 96 clubs will enter the competition.

The final was played on 5 May 2016 and contested between Malmö FF and BK Häcken at Swedbank Stadion, Malmö, with BK Häcken winning.

== Teams ==
Round	Clubs remaining	Clubs involved	Winners from previous round	New entries this round	Leagues entering at this round
Qualifying rounds	112	18	none	18	Division 1 (3 teams); Division 2 (4 teams); Division 3 (2 teams); Division 4 (8 teams); Division 5 (1 team)
Round 1	96	64	2	62	Division 1 (17 teams); Division 2 (25 teams); Division 3 (10 teams); Division 4 (10 teams)
Round 2	64	64	32	32	Allsvenskan; Superettan
Group stage	32	32	32	none	none
Quarter-finals	8	8	8	none	none
Semi-finals	4	4	4	none	none
Final	2	2	2	none	none

== Round and draw dates ==
The schedule of the competition is as follows.

Phase	Round	Draw date and time	Match date
Initial rounds	Round 1		5 August 2015 (latest)
Initial rounds	Round 2	7 August 2015	19–20 August 2015
Group stage	Matchday 1	26 November 2015, 12:00 CET	20–21 February 2016
Group stage	Matchday 2	26 November 2015, 12:00 CET	27–28 September 2016
Group stage	Matchday 3	26 November 2015, 12:00 CET	5–6 March 2016
Knockout stage	Quarter-finals	7 March 2016	13 March 2016
Knockout stage	Semi-finals	8 March 2016	20 March 2016
Knockout stage	Final	21 March 2016	5 May 2016

== Qualifying rounds ==
The only two associations of the Swedish District Football Associations that had a qualifying round were Dalarnas FF and Örebro Läns FF, with the teams from other districts being determined though district championships or by club ranking in 2014.

== Round 1 ==
64 teams from the third tier or lower of the Swedish league system will compete in this round. The round will be played between 9 June and 5 August 2015 with the majority of the fixtures played in early August. The number in brackets indicates what tier of Swedish football each team competed in during the 2015 season.

9 June 2015	KF Velebit (6)	1–2	Örgryte IS (3)	Gothenburg
18:45	Skiljo 90'	Report	S. Carlsson 61'; Klingberg 74'	Stadium: Velebit IP; Attendance: 511; Referee: Joakim Östling (Gothenburg)

10 June 2015	Team ThorenGruppen (4)	2–1	IFK Luleå (3)	Umeå
19:30	Nilsson 8' (pen.); Saliba 22'	Report	Wårell 23'	Stadium: Umeå Energi Arena; Attendance: 241; Referee: Isak Classon (Skellefteå)

10 June 2015	Danderyds SK (6)	1–5	BKV Norrtälje (4)	Danderyd
19:30	Johnsson 45'	Report	Svecke 12', 34'; Bagger 21'; Skogh 40'; A. Bellander 69' (pen.)	Stadium: Danderydsvallen; Attendance: 104; Referee: Suhel Youssef (Sollentuna)

16 June 2015	Råslätts SK (5)	0–5	Husqvarna FF (3)	Jönköping
19:30		Report	Abdullai 5'; Karlsson Adjei 13', 85'; Bernholtz 63'; Haidari 76'	Stadium: Råslätts IP; Attendance: 200; Referee: Andreas Johansson (Jönköping)

17 June 2015	IFK Aspudden-Tellus (4)	2–4	Enskede IK (4)	Stockholm
19:30	Birgersson 65'; Wanselius 76'	Report	Solini 30', 43'; Nobell 81'; Ahmed 83'	Stadium: Aspuddens IP; Attendance: 130; Referee: Fredrik Hansson (Stockholm)

23 June 2015	BK Astrio (6)	1–2	IS Halmia (3)	Halmstad
19:00	Jönsson 70'	Report	Amuneke 31' (pen.); Taube 40'	Stadium: Söndrums IP; Attendance: 211; Referee: Alexander Eriksson (Halmstad)

21 July 2015	Hittarps IK (5)	3–0	Högaborgs BK (4)	Helsingborg
19:00	Hallberg 37' (pen.); Alm 60'; Wihlstrand 67'	Report		Stadium: Laröds IP; Attendance: 250; Referee: Fredrik Rönning (Malmö)

22 July 2015	Tenhults IF (4)	4–1	Skövde AIK (4)	Tenhult
19:00	Fridén 8'; David 40', 73'; Hasani 54' (pen.)	Report	Brahimi 75'	Stadium: Kabevallen; Attendance: 311; Referee: Levente Szasz (Ljungby)

28 July 2015	FBK Karlstad (5)	0–3	BK Forward (3)	Karlstad
19:00		Report	Björndahl 50', 66'; Berger 86'	Stadium: Örsholmens IP; Attendance: 255; Referee: Mattias Johansson (Ransta)

28 July 2015	Götene IF (5)	4–1	IFK Skövde (4)	Götene
19:00	Apell 24', 54', 65'; Dahlin 60'	Report	Sjöman 70'	Stadium: Västerby IP; Attendance: 211; Referee: Kristoffer Thorold (Mariestad)

29 July 2015	Söderhamns FF (4)	3–1	Selånger FK (4)	Söderhamn
19:00	Edberg 26'; Celjo 30'; Fäger 89'	Report	Brännström 82'	Stadium: Helsingehus Arena; Attendance: 364; Referee: Martin Palm (Örnsköldsvik)

30 July 2015	Kuddby IF (6)	2–3	IF Sylvia (4)	Norrköping
19:00	Magnusson 6'; Lindberg 52'	Report	Youssif 70'; Castegren 81'; Chabo 89'	Stadium: Helgestad IP; Attendance: 165; Referee: Pär Leek (Vetlanda)

1 August 2015	Mörrums GoIS (6)	0–10	Kristianstads FF (3)	Mörrum
13:00		Report	Netabay 54', 59', 72', 86'; A. Ejupi 55'; Nilsson 57'; Bloom 64'; Grahm 69', 80'; Zeković 88'	Stadium: Laxvallen; Attendance: 188; Referee: Nehat Maxhuni (Karlskrona)

1 August 2015	Torstorps IF (6)	2–1	Triangelns IK (6)	Finspång
15:00	Mahović 66' (pen.); Forsström 81'	Report	Kamari 42'	Stadium: Atlaslunden; Attendance: 192; Referee: Shayan Mollaei (Linköping)

4 August 2015	Upsala IF (4)	2–2 (a.e.t.) (2–4 p)	Västerås SK (3)	Uppsala
19:00	Bale 81' (pen.); Kvarneå 90+3'	Report	Ljunggren Eriksson 29' (pen.); Safari 52'	Stadium: Studenternas IP; Attendance: 160; Referee: Patrik Magnetorp (Nyköping)
	Penalties
	Gustafsson (penalty missed); Nema (penalty scored); Kvarneå (penalty scored); Morger (penalty missed)		(penalty scored) Safari; (penalty scored) Medvegy; (penalty scored) Fredriksson; (penalty scored) Ekroth

4 August 2015	Ursvik IK (6)	2–3	Ekerö IK (4)	Sundbyberg
19:00	Papathanasiou 19'; Agegnehu Kyrk 63'	Report	Whitman 27' (pen.); Karlsson 64', 85'	Stadium: Ursviks IP; Attendance: 155; Referee: Suhel Youssef (Sollentuna)

4 August 2015	Somaliska UF (6)	3–2	Östers IF (3)	Växjö
19:00	Hazara 19'; Vasilj 78' (o.g.); Kiddu 90+2'	Report	Elvby 1'; Lindblad 28'	Stadium: Myresjöhus Arena; Attendance: 511; Referee: Håkan Söderman (Jönköping)

4 August 2015	Herrestads AIF (6)	0–3	FC Trollhättan (4)	Herrestad
19:00		Report	Gustafsson 60', 85'; Johansson 82'	Stadium: Undavallen; Attendance: 340; Referee: Niklas Nyberg (Gothenburg)

4 August 2015	IK Virgo (5)	2–4	Assyriska BK (4)	Gothenburg
19:00	Falk 5'; Nikkilä 83'	Report	Albano Neves 3'; Sanduvac 41'; Y. Staifo 57'; M. Garis 90+3'	Stadium: Mossens IP; Attendance: 87; Referee: Tarik Tongur (Gothenburg)

4 August 2015	Lunden ÖBK (5)	2–1	Tvååkers IF (4)	Gothenburg
19:00	Anbacken 47'; Magier 87'	Report	Gunnarsson 67'	Stadium: Överåsvallen; Attendance: 60; Referee: Denis Oppong (Gothenburg)

4 August 2015	BW 90 IF (4)	1–5	Trelleborgs FF (3)	Bjärsjölagård
19:00	Svensson 9'	Report	Karlsson 35'; Camara Jönsson 43'; Jovanović 52'; Palander 58'; Haynes 60'	Stadium: Bjärsjölagårds IP; Attendance: 210; Referee: Fredrik Klitte (Helsingborg)

4 August 2015	FC Rosengård 1917 (4)	1–4	Eskilsminne IF (3)	Malmö
19:00	Antwi 4'	Report	Book 13', 39', 46'; Lindgren Holenstein 77'	Stadium: Rosengårds Södra IP; Attendance: 104; Referee: Henrik Reffers (Arkelstorp)

5 August 2015	Husie IF (5)	0–4	FC Höllviken (3)	Malmö
18:00		Report	Henriksson 49'; Mesić 66'; Pärsson 79'; Faniq 83'	Stadium: Husiegårds IP; Attendance: 254; Referee: Adnan Jukić (Falkenberg)

5 August 2015	Gamla Upsala SK (4)	0–4	Akropolis IF (3)	Uppsala
18:30		Report	Kabondo 38', 64'; Lundberg 48' (o.g.); Stavrothanasopoulos 58'	Stadium: Gamlis IP; Attendance: 116; Referee: Metin Yıldırım (Södertälje)

5 August 2015	IFK Östersund (4)	3–5 (a.e.t.)	Härnösands FF (4)	Östersund
19:00	Lindgren 18', 35'; Pihlström 90'	Report	Svärd 14' (o.g.); Boroștean 27'; Forsgren 44'; Bedjaoui 103', 115'	Stadium: Jämtkraft Arena; Attendance: 75; Referee: Rickard Lingensjö (Kvissleby)

5 August 2015	Sandvikens IF (4)	1–3	IK Brage (3)	Sandviken
19:00	Vigren 81'	Report	O. Lundin 49'; Júlíusson 69'; Johansson 74'	Stadium: Jernvallen; Attendance: 958; Referee: Ejub Mehić (Enköping)

5 August 2015	Sollentuna FF (4)	3–2 (a.e.t.)	Vasalunds IF (3)	Sollentuna
19:00	Gustafsson 60'; Åberg 69'; Wiorek 104'	Report	Gómez 50'; Tappert 90+5'	Stadium: Sollentunavallen; Attendance: 300; Referee: Fredrik Hansson (Stockholm)

5 August 2015	Melleruds IF (5)	0–5	Carlstad United (3)	Mellerud
19:00		Report	Lander 12'; Jingfors 21'; T. Larsson 25'; Gashi 32'; Stenberg 56'	Stadium: Rådavallen; Attendance: 411; Referee: Kristoffer Thorold (Mariestad)

5 August 2015	Nybro IF (5)	3–3 (a.e.t.) (3–4 p)	Oskarshamns AIK (3)	Nybro
19:00	Gómez 37'; Hoang 90+4'; Olsson 117'	Report	Birgersson 50'; Östlind 70', 102'	Stadium: Victoriavallen; Attendance: 155; Referee: Yousef Issa (Nässjö)
	Penalties
	R. Eliassi (penalty scored); Gómez (penalty missed); K. Eliassi (penalty scored); S. Eliassi (penalty missed); Delashob (penalty scored)		(penalty missed) Jägerbrink; (penalty scored) Pishdari; (penalty scored) Pavić; (penalty scored) Östlind; (penalty scored) Smakolli

5 August 2015	Vara SK (5)	0–1	Norrby IF (3)	Vara
19:00		Report	Krasnici 40'	Stadium: Torsvallen; Attendance: 77; Referee: Robin Wilde (Gothenburg)

5 August 2015	Nacka FF (4)	3–1 (a.e.t.)	Huddinge IF (3)	Nacka
19:30	Lindgren 90'; Weidlitz 100'; Nilsson 120'	Report	Matić 80'	Stadium: Boovallen; Attendance: 341; Referee: Viktor Dovresjö (Stockholm)

5 August 2015	FC Gute (4)	5–0	Södertälje FK (3)	Visby
19:45	Wihlborg 13'; Mambo Mumba 33'; Dahlström 40'; Almlöf Wickman 45'; Cucković 66'	Report		Stadium: Gutavallen; Attendance: 430; Referee: Johan Kjellin (Sundbyberg)

== Round 2 ==
All teams from 2015 Allsvenskan and 2015 Superettan entered in this round, 32 teams in total, where they were joined by the 32 winners from round 1. The 32 teams from Allsvenskan and Superettan were seeded and played against the 32 winners from round 1, the matches was played at the home venues for the unseeded teams. The 16 northernmost seeded teams were drawn against the 16 northernmost unseeded teams and the same with the southernmost teams.

The draw was made on 7 August 2015. The second round will be played on 19 and 20 August 2015, but some matches may be moved to a later date depending on participation in 2015–16 UEFA Champions League and 2015–16 UEFA Europa League. The number in brackets indicates what tier of Swedish football each team competed in during the 2015 season. Somaliska UF and Torstorps IF were the lowest-ranked teams in this round, competing in Division 4, the sixth tier of Swedish football.

19 August 2015	Tenhults IF (4)	2–0	Mjällby AIF (2)	Tenhult
18:00	Ebuka 32'; Hasani 57'	Report		Stadium: Kabevallen; Attendance: 400; Referee: Andreas Johansson (Jönköping)

19 August 2015	Kristianstads FF (3)	1–6	IFK Göteborg (1)	Kristianstad
18:15	A. Ejupi 85'	Report	Pettersson 20'; Sköld 56', 61', 84'; Salomonsson 67' (pen.); Boman 71'	Stadium: Kristianstads IP; Attendance: 2,110; Referee: Robert Daradić (Helsingborg)

19 August 2015	Husqvarna FF (3)	2–3	BK Häcken (1)	Jönköping
18:15	Karlsson Adjei 11'; Abdullai 21'	Report	Andersson 24' (o.g.); Rexhepi 46', 88'	Stadium: Vapenvallen; Attendance: 237; Referee: Farouk Nehdi (Huddinge)

19 August 2015	Oskarshamns AIK (3)	0–1	Jönköpings Södra IF (2)	Oskarshamn
18:30		Report	Rönneklev 78'	Stadium: Arena Oskarshamn; Attendance: 300; Referee: Victor Wolf (Stockholm)

19 August 2015	FC Höllviken (3)	0–2	Ängelholms FF (2)	Höllviken
18:30		Report	Asaad 50'; Baggner 54'	Stadium: Höllvikens IP; Attendance: 196; Referee: Bobby Sjögren (Helsingborg)

19 August 2015	IK Brage (3)	0–2	IK Frej (2)	Borlänge
19:00		Report	Lallet 80', 90+1'	Stadium: Domnarvsvallen; Attendance: 527; Referee: Mohamed Nablsi (Gävle)

19 August 2015	Team ThorenGruppen (4)	0–4	Gefle IF (1)	Umeå
19:00		Report	Lantto 4'; Tshakasua 68'; Bellander 72'; Hjelte 83'	Stadium: Umeå Energi Arena; Attendance: 802; Referee: Roland Adelsson (Vindeln)

19 August 2015	Söderhamns FF (4)	1–2	Östersunds FK (2)	Söderhamn
19:00	Celjo 48'	Report	Tanda 68'; Widgren 85'	Stadium: Helsingehus Arena; Attendance: 941; Referee: Patrik Eriksson (Gävle)

19 August 2015	Enskede IK (4)	0–4	GIF Sundsvall (1)	Stockholm
19:00		Report	Hasani 22'; Helg 24', 48'; Dibba 85'	Stadium: Enskede IP; Attendance: 241; Referee: Dragan Banjac (Haninge)

19 August 2015	BKV Norrtälje (4)	0–3	Örebro SK (1)	Norrtälje
19:00		Report	Gustavsson 5'; Holmberg 64'; Gerzić 79'	Stadium: Norrtälje Sportcentrum; Attendance: 914; Referee: Mattias Johansson (Ransta)

19 August 2015	Härnösands FF (4)	1–3	Syrianska FC (2)	Härnösand
19:00	Gustafsson 38'	Report	Karlsson 30'; Liljestrand 43'; Katourgi 90+3'	Stadium: Högslättens IP; Attendance: 1,800; Referee: Niklas Abrahamsson (Sollefteå)

19 August 2015	Örgryte IS (3)	0–2 (a.e.t.)	IFK Värnamo (2)	Gothenburg
19:00		Report	Kozica 119' (pen.); Göransson 120+4'	Stadium: Gamla Ullevi; Attendance: 1,872; Referee: Adnan Jukić (Falkenberg)

19 August 2015	Somaliska UF (6)	0–1	IF Elfsborg (1)	Växjö
19:00		Report	Prodell 34'	Stadium: Myresjöhus Arena; Attendance: 841; Referee: Nermin Čisić (Värnamo)

19 August 2015	FC Trollhättan (4)	4–3 (a.e.t.)	Utsiktens BK (2)	Trollhättan
19:00	Bennhage 49', 87'; Bilan 103'; Daoud 106'	Report	Bohm 21'; Mogren 45+1'; Westermark 105'	Stadium: Edsborgs IP; Attendance: 755; Referee: Haris Memišević (Gothenburg)

19 August 2015	Eskilsminne IF (3)	1–2	Varbergs BoIS (2)	Helsingborg
19:00	Levi 66'	Report	Lindner 35'; Petersson 60' (o.g.)	Stadium: Harlyckans IP; Attendance: 513; Referee: Niklas Andersson (Malmö)

19 August 2015	Hittarps IK (5)	0–3	Ljungskile SK (2)	Helsingborg
19:00		Report	Andersson 10'; Lindberg 28'; Olsson 90'	Stadium: Laröds IP; Attendance: 199; Referee: Per Melin (Kävlinge)

19 August 2015	FC Gute (4)	2–4 (a.e.t.)	Degerfors IF (2)	Visby
19:30	Mambo Mumba 81'; Marjanović 84'	Report	L. Fritzson 51', 66', 92'; Molander 113'	Stadium: Gutavallen; Attendance: 964; Referee: Fredrik Hansson (Stockholm)

19 August 2015	Sollentuna FF (4)	1–2	Assyriska FF (2)	Sollentuna
19:30	Thorstensson 79'	Report	Blanco Leschuk 59'; Makdessi 88'	Stadium: Sollentunavallen; Attendance: 825; Referee: Adam Ladebäck (Visby)

19 August 2015	Ekerö IK (4)	0–6	AIK (1)	Ekerö
19:30		Report	Brustad 45', 56'; Bangura 51'; Salétros 82'; Eliasson 84'; Goitom 90+1'	Stadium: Träkvistavallen; Attendance: 4,308; Referee: Johan Krantz (Uppsala)

19 August 2015	Nacka FF (4)	1–2	IK Sirius (2)	Nacka
19:30	Nilsson 56'	Report	S. Berg 27'; J. Berg 54'	Stadium: Boovallen; Attendance: 312; Referee: Mikael Devletyan Gudmundsson (Stockholm)

20 August 2015	Torstorps IF (6)	1–5	Djurgårdens IF (1)	Finspång
18:00	Björhn 44'	Report	Karlström 30'; Kadewere 37'; Bergström 75'; Andersson 83', 86'	Stadium: Atlaslunden; Attendance: 2,528; Referee: Jim Petersson (Motala)

20 August 2015	Carlstad United (3)	2–3	Hammarby IF (1)	Karlstad
19:00	Nyman 16'; S. Carlsson 52'	Report	Bakircioglü 2' (pen.); Sætra 31'; Gran 63' (o.g.)	Stadium: Tingvalla IP; Attendance: 2,632; Referee: Namik Idrizović (Örebro)

20 August 2015	Akropolis IF (3)	0–5	IFK Norrköping (1)	Stockholm
19:00		Report	Nyman 15', 69'; Kamara 20', 24'; Lawan 85'	Stadium: Spånga IP; Attendance: 320; Referee: Diako Behnam (Stockholm)

20 August 2015	IF Sylvia (4)	0–3	IF Brommapojkarna (2)	Norrköping
19:00		Report	Sandberg Magnusson 21'; Gyökeres 38', 41'	Stadium: Nya Parken; Attendance: 144; Referee: Mohammed Al-Hakim (Köping)

20 August 2015	Västerås SK (3)	3–3 (a.e.t.) (3–4 p)	AFC United (2)	Västerås
19:00	Salimi 10'; Safari 90' (pen.); Ekroth 114' (pen.)	Report	Omeje 57'; Gerbino Polo 80'; Eddahri 103'	Stadium: Swedbank Park; Attendance: 1,900; Referee: Björn Särnbrink (Huddinge)
	Penalties
	Ekroth (penalty scored); Johansson (penalty missed); García (penalty missed); Gustafsson (penalty scored); Hägg (penalty scored)		(penalty scored) El Kabir; (penalty scored) Eddahri; (penalty missed) Smedjegården; (penalty scored) Omeje; (penalty scored) Rogić

20 August 2015	Trelleborgs FF (3)	1–2	Halmstads BK (1)	Trelleborg
19:00	Jovanović 45'	Report	Rusike 59'; Maholli 69'	Stadium: Vångavallen; Attendance: 652; Referee: Kaspar Sjöberg (Malmö)

20 August 2015	IS Halmia (3)	1–1 (a.e.t.) (2–4 p)	Kalmar FF (1)	Halmstad
19:00	Selmani 9'	Report	Antonsson 31'	Stadium: Örjans Vall; Attendance: 308; Referee: Fredrik Klitte (Helsingborg)
	Penalties
	Ferman (penalty missed); Ingves (penalty scored); Amuneke (penalty scored); Selmani (penalty missed)		(penalty scored) Antonsson; (penalty missed) Eriksson; (penalty scored) Thorbjörnsson; (penalty scored) Romário; (penalty scored) Ismael

20 August 2015	Norrby IF (3)	3–3 (a.e.t.) (5–6 p)	GAIS (2)	Borås
19:00	Yarsuvat 13', 89'; Ekvall 105' (pen.)	Report	Ayarna 60'; Cadogan 78'; Lundgren 109'	Stadium: Borås Arena; Attendance: 564; Referee: Mikael Eriksson (Jönköping)
	Penalties
	Översjö (penalty scored); Osmanagić (penalty scored); Ekvall (penalty missed); M. Krasniqi (penalty scored); Hodžić (penalty missed); Savolainen (penalty scored); A. Krasnici (penalty scored); Sarzyński (penalty missed)		(penalty missed) Ingelsten; (penalty scored) Lundgren; (penalty scored) Cadogan; (penalty missed) Starke Hedlund; (penalty scored) Eriksson; (penalty scored) Andersson; (penalty scored) Ayarna; (penalty scored) Moënza

20 August 2015	Lunden ÖBK (5)	1–8	Helsingborgs IF (1)	Gothenburg
19:00	Walberg Wesström 90'	Report	Prica 7', 9'; Bojanić 33', 43'; J. Larsson 51', 89'; Lindström 54'; Smárason 74'	Stadium: Överåsvallen; Attendance: 1,025; Referee: Antti Kanerva (Olofstorp)

20 August 2015	Assyriska BK (4)	0–4	Falkenbergs FF (1)	Gothenburg
19:00		Report	Sjöstedt 33'; Mustafa 55'; Jakobsen 70'; Vall 78'	Stadium: Ruddalens IP; Attendance: 300; Referee: Magnus Lindgren (Gothenburg)

26 August 2015	BK Forward (3)	2–1	Åtvidabergs FF (1)	Örebro
18:00	Björndahl 9'; Näfver 31'	Report	Kujović 27'	Stadium: Trängens IP; Attendance: 300; Referee: Ozan Camlibel (Stockholm)

8 November 2015	Götene IF (5)	0–5	Malmö FF (1)	Götene
13:00		Report	Rodić 1', 10'; Berget 45', 84'; Kroon 87'	Stadium: Västerby IP; Attendance: 4,036; Referee: Joakim Östling (Gothenburg)

== Group stage ==
The 32 winners from round 2 will be divided into eight groups of four teams. The 16 highest ranked winners from the previous rounds will be seeded to the top two positions in each groups and the 16 remaining winners will be unseeded in the draw. The ranking of the 16 seeded teams was decided by league position in the 2015 season. All teams in the group stage play each other once, the highest ranked teams from the previous rounds and teams from tier three or lower have the right to play two home matches. The draw was held on 26 November 2015. The group stage will begin on 20 February and concluded on 6 March 2016.

All times listed below are in Central European Time (UTC+1). (Note: This is the time zone of Sweden during the winter when group stage is played.)

=== Tie-breaking criteria and key ===
If two or more teams are equal on points on completion of the group matches, the following criteria will be applied to determine the rankings

1. Superior goal difference
2. Higher number of goals scored
3. Result between the teams in question
4. Higher league position in the 2015 season

=== Group 1 ===
Pos	Team	Pld	W	D	L	GF	GA	GD	Pts	Qualification	IFKN	JSIF	ÖFK	AFC
1	IFK Norrköping	3	2	1	0	6	1	+5	7	Advance to Knockout stage	—	1–1	4–0	—
2	Jönköpings Södra IF	3	1	1	1	2	2	0	4		—	—	1–0	0–1
3	Östersunds FK	3	1	0	2	3	5	−2	3		—	—	—	3–0
4	AFC United	3	1	0	2	1	4	−3	3		0–1	—	—	—

Source: Swedish Football Association
Rules for classification: 1) Points; 2) Goal difference; 3) Goals scored; 4) Head-to-head record; 5) Highest ranked team

20 February 2016 Matchday 1	IFK Norrköping (1)	4–0	Östersunds FK (1)	Norrköping
14:00	Traustason 17'; Bärkroth 36'; Kujović 72'; Enarsson 90+2'	Report		Stadium: Nya Parken; Attendance: 1,423; Referee: Johan Krantz

20 February 2016 Matchday 1	Jönköpings Södra IF (1)	0–1	AFC United (2)	Jönköping
15:00		Report	El Kabir 79'	Stadium: Elmia; Attendance: 354; Referee: Patrik Eriksson

27 February 2016 Matchday 2	AFC United (2)	0–1	IFK Norrköping (1)	Solna
13:00		Report	Kujović 72'	Stadium: Skytteholms IP; Attendance: 175; Referee: Lars Olsson

27 February 2016 Matchday 2	Jönköpings Södra IF (1)	1–0	Östersunds FK (1)	Jönköping
15:00	Thelin 72' (o.g.)	Report		Stadium: Elmia; Attendance: 344; Referee: Antti Kanerva

6 March 2016 Matchday 3	Östersunds FK (1)	3–0	AFC United (2)	Östersund
14:00	Gero 13', 44'; Ghoddos 40'	Report		Stadium: Jämtkraft Arena; Attendance: 671; Referee: Johan Krantz

6 March 2016 Matchday 3	IFK Norrköping (1)	1–1	Jönköpings Södra IF (1)	Norrköping
14:00	Kujovic 9' (pen.)	Report	Smylie 17'	Stadium: Nya Parken; Attendance: 1 362; Referee: Kristoffer Karlsson

=== Group 2 ===
Pos	Team	Pld	W	D	L	GF	GA	GD	Pts	Qualification	HBK	IFKG	IKF	DEG
1	Halmstads BK	3	2	0	1	5	3	+2	6	Advance to Knockout stage	—	—	2–0	3–0
2	IFK Göteborg	3	1	2	0	5	2	+3	5		3–0	—	—	1–1
3	IK Frej	3	0	2	1	2	4	−2	2		—	1–1	—	—
4	Degerfors IF	3	0	2	1	2	5	−3	2		—	—	1–1	—

Source: Swedish Football Association
Rules for classification: 1) Points; 2) Goal difference; 3) Goals scored; 4) Head-to-head record; 5) Highest ranked team

20 February 2016 Matchday 1	Halmstads BK (2)	2–0	IK Frej (2)	Halmstad
16:00	Olsson 19', 45'	Report		Stadium: Skedalahed IP; Attendance: 224; Referee: Robert Daradic

21 February 2016 Matchday 1	IFK Göteborg (1)	1–1	Degerfors IF (2)	Gothenburg
16:00	Hermannsson 28'	Report	Samuelsson 59'	Stadium: Bravida Arena; Attendance: 3,607; Referee: Johan Hamlin

27 February 2016 Matchday 2	Halmstads BK (2)	3–0	Degerfors IF (2)	Halmstad
14:00	Ruud Tveter 4', 12'; Olsson 13'	Report		Stadium: Skedalahed IP; Attendance: 529; Referee: Adnan Jukic

28 February 2016 Matchday 2	IK Frej (2)	1–1	IFK Göteborg (1)	Solna
16:30	Runnemo 31'	Report	Sköld 13'	Stadium: Skytteholms IP; Referee: Johan Krantz

6 March 2016 Matchday 3	Degerfors IF (2)	1–1	IK Frej (2)	Degerfors
16:00	Öst 91'	Report	Akpoveta 44'	Stadium: Stora Valla; Attendance: 200; Referee: Jesper Ekwall

6 March 2016 Matchday 3	IFK Göteborg (1)	3–0	Halmstads BK (2)	Gothenburg
16:00	Engvall 13'; Rieks 33'; Hysén 65'	Report		Stadium: Bravida Arena; Attendance: 1,815; Referee: Andreas Ekberg

=== Group 3 ===
Pos	Team	Pld	W	D	L	GF	GA	GD	Pts	Qualification	AIK	FFF	VAR	TIF
1	AIK	3	3	0	0	10	2	+8	9	Advance to Knockout stage	—	2–1	2–1	—
2	Falkenbergs FF	3	1	1	1	4	3	+1	4		—	—	1–1	—
3	Varbergs BoIS	3	1	1	1	3	3	0	4		—	—	—	1–0
4	Tenhults IF	3	0	0	3	0	9	−9	0		0–6	0–2	—	—

Source: Swedish Football Association
Rules for classification: 1) Points; 2) Goal difference; 3) Goals scored; 4) Head-to-head record; 5) Highest ranked team

20 February 2016 Matchday 1	AIK (1)	2–1	Varbergs BoIS (2)	Solna
14:00	Brustad 20'; Avdic 70'	Report	Peter 74'	Stadium: Skytteholms IP; Referee: Stefan Johannesson

21 February 2016 Matchday 1	Tenhults IF (4)	0–2	Falkenbergs FF (1)	Jönköping
16:00		Report	Nazari 31'; Nilsson 65'	Stadium: Elmia; Referee: Nermin Cisic

27 February 2016 Matchday 2	Falkenbergs FF (1)	1–1	Varbergs BoIS (2)	Falkenberg
13:00	Araba 90'	Report	Alba 36'	Stadium: Kristineslätts IP; Attendance: 800; Referee: Bojan Pandzic

28 February 2016 Matchday 2	Tenhults IF (4)	0–6	AIK (1)	Jönköping
16:00		Report	Markkanen 14'; Affane 25'; Hauksson 67'; Nikolić 83'; Väisänen 85'; Isak 86'	Stadium: Elmia; Attendance: 1,857; Referee: Johan Hamlin

5 March 2016 Matchday 3	Varbergs BoIS (2)	1–0	Tenhults IF (4)	Varberg
14:00	Boakye 90'	Report		Stadium: Påskbergsvallen; Attendance: 150; Referee: Diako Behnam

5 March 2016 Matchday 3	AIK (1)	2–1	Falkenbergs FF (1)	Solna
14:00	Yasin 7'; Hauksson 36'	Report	Krizanović 14'	Stadium: Skytteholms IP; Attendance: 3,200; Referee: Markus Strömbergsson

=== Group 4 ===
Pos	Team	Pld	W	D	L	GF	GA	GD	Pts	Qualification	KFF	IFE	AFF	IFKV
1	Kalmar FF	3	3	0	0	6	2	+4	9	Advance to Knockout stage	—	—	3–1	2–1
2	IF Elfsborg	3	1	1	1	6	6	0	4		0–1	—	3–2	—
3	Assyriska FF	3	1	0	2	4	6	−2	3		—	—	—	1–0
4	IFK Värnamo	3	0	1	2	4	6	−2	1		—	3–3	—	—

Source: Swedish Football Association
Rules for classification: 1) Points; 2) Goal difference; 3) Goals scored; 4) Head-to-head record; 5) Highest ranked team

20 February 2016 Matchday 1	Kalmar FF (1)	2–1	IFK Värnamo (2)	Kalmar
14:00	Jebali 49' (o.g.); R. Elm 86'	Report	Cederqvist 37'	Stadium: Gasten IP; Referee: Per Melin

20 February 2016 Matchday 1	IF Elfsborg (1)	3–2	Assyriska FF (2)	Borås
15:00	Prodell 13', 53'; Claesson 73'	Report	Pavey 17'; Fagerberg 74'	Stadium: Borås Arena; Referee: Magnus Lindgren

27 February 2016 Matchday 2	IFK Värnamo (2)	3–3	IF Elfsborg (1)	Värnamo
14:00	Svahn 5'; Johansson 28'; Cederqvist 79'	Report	Horn 49'; Claesson 58'; Hedlund 68'	Stadium: Finnvedsvallen; Attendance: 668; Referee: Jim Petersson

27 February 2016 Matchday 2	Kalmar FF (1)	3–1	Assyriska FF (2)	Kalmar
14:00	Eriksson 16'; Agardius 45'; Antonsson 81'	Report	Söderström 90'	Stadium: Gasten IP; Referee: Magnus Lindgren

5 March 2016 Matchday 3	Assyriska FF (2)	1–0	IFK Värnamo (2)	Södertälje
16:00	Genc 38' (pen.)	Report		Stadium: Södertälje Fotbollsarena; Attendance: 100; Referee: Patrik Eriksson

5 March 2016 Matchday 3	IF Elfsborg (1)	0–1	Kalmar FF (1)	Borås
16:00		Report	Johansson 83'	Stadium: Borås Arena; Referee: Nermin Cisic

=== Group 5 ===
Pos	Team	Pld	W	D	L	GF	GA	GD	Pts	Qualification	MFF	IKS	GIFS	ÄFF
1	Malmö FF	3	3	0	0	10	2	+8	9	Advance to Knockout stage	—	2–1	4–0	—
2	IK Sirius	3	1	1	1	3	3	0	4		—	—	—	1–1
3	GIF Sundsvall	3	1	0	2	1	5	−4	3		—	0–1	—	1–0
4	Ängelholms FF	3	0	1	2	2	6	−4	1		1–4	—	—	—

Source: Swedish Football Association
Rules for classification: 1) Points; 2) Goal difference; 3) Goals scored; 4) Head-to-head record; 5) Highest ranked team

20 February 2016 Matchday 1	GIF Sundsvall (1)	1–0	Ängelholms FF (2)	Sundsvall
15:00	Pa Dibba 85'	Report		Stadium: Nordichallen; Attendance: 489; Referee: Markus Strömbergsson

20 February 2016 Matchday 1	Malmö FF (1)	2–1	IK Sirius (2)	Malmö
16:00	Berget 34', 77'	Report	Sarfo 5'	Stadium: Malmö IP; Attendance: 3,625; Referee: Kristoffer Karlsson

27 February 2016 Matchday 2	GIF Sundsvall (1)	0–1	IK Sirius (2)	Sundsvall
15:00		Report	Hopkins 25'	Stadium: Nordichallen; Referee: Glenn Nyberg

28 February 2016 Matchday 2	Ängelholms FF (2)	1–4	Malmö FF (1)	Malmö
14:00	Eiswohld 44'	Report	Berget 49', 75'; Kjartansson 59'; Rasmus Bengtsson 68'	Stadium: Malmö IP; Referee: Andreas Ekberg

5 March 2016 Matchday 3	IK Sirius (2)	1–1	Ängelholms FF (2)	Uppsala
14:00	Skoglund 1'	Report	Ljungberg 72'	Stadium: Lötens IP; Referee: Antti Kanerva

5 March 2016 Matchday 3	Malmö FF (1)	4–0	GIF Sundsvall (1)	Malmö
14:00	Kjartansson 5'; Christiansen; Molins 76', 81'	Report		Stadium: Malmö IP; Referee: Per Melin

=== Group 6 ===
Pos	Team	Pld	W	D	L	GF	GA	GD	Pts	Qualification	HAM	SFC	DIF	LSK
1	Hammarby IF	3	2	1	0	7	3	+4	7	Advance to Knockout stage	—	0–0	—	4–2
2	Syrianska FC	3	2	1	0	2	0	+2	7		—	—	1–0	—
3	Djurgårdens IF	3	1	0	2	3	5	−2	3		1–3	—	—	2–1
4	Ljungskile SK	3	0	0	3	3	7	−4	0		—	0–1	—	—

Source: Swedish Football Association
Rules for classification: 1) Points; 2) Goal difference; 3) Goals scored; 4) Head-to-head record; 5) Highest ranked team

21 February 2016 Matchday 1	Hammarby IF (1)	0–0	Syrianska FC (2)	Stockholm
15:00		Report		Stadium: Tele2 Arena; Attendance: 9,166; Referee: Diako Behnam

22 February 2016 Matchday 1	Djurgårdens IF (1)	2–1	Ljungskile SK (2)	Stockholm
19:00	Strömberg 57' (o.g.); Andersson 85'	Report	Olsson 77'	Stadium: Tele2 Arena; Attendance: 6,409; Referee: Jonas Eriksson

28 February 2016 Matchday 2	Syrianska FC (2)	1–0	Djurgårdens IF (1)	Södertälje
14:00	Katourgi 52'	Report		Stadium: Södertälje Fotbollsarena; Referee: Mohammed Al-Hakim

29 February 2016 Matchday 2	Hammarby IF (1)	4–2	Ljungskile SK (2)	Stockholm
19:00	Israelsson 44'; Khalili 55'; Bakircioglu 72'; Alex 82'	Report	Olsson 2'; Nilsen 3'	Stadium: Tele2 Arena; Referee: Martin Strömbergsson

6 March 2016 Matchday 3	Ljungskile SK (2)	0–1	Syrianska FC (2)	Lilla Edet
14:00		Report	Katourgi 52'	Stadium: Strömsvallen; Referee: Adnan Jukic

6 March 2016 Matchday 3	Djurgårdens IF (1)	1–3	Hammarby IF (1)	Stockholm
14:00	Andersson 4'	Report	Alex 20'; Persson 26'; Haglund 77'	Stadium: Tele2 Arena; Attendance: 21,367; Referee: Farouk Nehdi

=== Group 7 ===
Pos	Team	Pld	W	D	L	GF	GA	GD	Pts	Qualification	BKH	FCT	GIF	BP
1	BK Häcken	3	2	1	0	10	2	+8	7	Advance to Knockout stage	—	—	4–0	0–0
2	FC Trollhättan	3	1	1	1	5	8	−3	4		2–6	—	2–1	—
3	Gefle IF	3	1	0	2	5	8	−3	3		—	—	—	4–2
4	IF Brommapojkarna	3	0	2	1	3	5	−2	2		—	1–1	—	—

Source: Swedish Football Association
Rules for classification: 1) Points; 2) Goal difference; 3) Goals scored; 4) Head-to-head record; 5) Highest ranked team

20 February 2016 Matchday 1	BK Häcken (1)	0–0	IF Brommapojkarna (3)	Gothenburg
14:00		Report		Stadium: Bravida Arena; Attendance: 300; Referee: Fredrik Klitte

20 February 2016 Matchday 1	FC Trollhättan (3)	2–1	Gefle IF (1)	Trollhättan
14:00	Sundström 56'; Beqiri 90'	Report	Bertilsson 27'	Stadium: Edsborgs IP; Attendance: 354; Referee: Bojan Pandžić

27 February 2016 Matchday 2	FC Trollhättan (3)	2–6	BK Häcken (1)	Trollhättan
14:00	Bagger 31'; Sundström 82'	Report	Jeremejeff 9', 29'; Paulinho 51', 64'; Owoeri 80', 90'	Stadium: Edsborgs IP; Attendance: 724; Referee: Robert Daradic

27 February 2016 Matchday 2	Gefle IF (1)	4–2	IF Brommapojkarna (3)	Gävle
14:00	Nilsson 12'; Oremo 20'; Skrabb 38'; Bertilsson 90'	Report	Martinsson Ngouali 8'; Beijmo 85'	Stadium: Gavlevallen; Attendance: 274; Referee: Diako Behnam

5 March 2016 Matchday 3	IF Brommapojkarna (3)	1–1	FC Trollhättan (3)	Stockholm
14:00	Gyökeres 11'	Report	Bilan 87'	Stadium: Grimsta IP; Attendance: 109; Referee: Farouk Nehdi

5 March 2016 Matchday 3	BK Häcken (1)	4–0	Gefle IF (1)	Gothenburg
14:00	Paulinho 43', 53', 76'; Jeremejeff 57'	Report		Stadium: Bravida Arena; Referee: Mohammed Al-Hakim

=== Group 8 ===
Pos	Team	Pld	W	D	L	GF	GA	GD	Pts	Qualification	HIF	ÖSK	BKF	GAIS
1	Helsingborgs IF	3	2	1	0	5	2	+3	7	Advance to Knockout stage	—	1–1	—	3–1
2	Örebro SK	3	1	2	0	6	4	+2	5		—	—	—	3–1
3	BK Forward	3	1	1	1	7	4	+3	4		0–1	2–2	—	—
4	GAIS	3	0	0	3	3	11	−8	0		—	—	1–5	—

Source: Swedish Football Association
Rules for classification: 1) Points; 2) Goal difference; 3) Goals scored; 4) Head-to-head record; 5) Highest ranked team

20 February 2016 Matchday 1	Helsingborgs IF (1)	3–1	GAIS (2)	Helsingborg
14:00	Larsson 20'; Christensen 37'; Bojanić 65'	Report	Singh 63'	Stadium: Olympiafältet; Referee: Andreas Ekberg

21 February 2016 Matchday 1	BK Forward (3)	2–2	Örebro SK (1)	Örebro
14:00	Björndahl 8'; Berger 89'	Report	Nordin Gerzić 65'; Holmberg 68'	Stadium: Behrn Arena; Attendance: 2,700; Referee: Mohammed Al-Hakim

27 February 2016 Matchday 2	Örebro SK (1)	3–1	GAIS (2)	Örebro
14:00	Nordin Gerzić 9'; Nordmark 64'; Hines-Ike 79'	Report	Johannesson 81'	Stadium: Behrn Arena; Attendance: 897; Referee: Markus Strömbergsson

28 February 2016 Matchday 2	BK Forward (3)	0–1	Helsingborgs IF (1)	Örebro
14:00		Report	Hallenius 13'	Stadium: Behrn Arena; Attendance: 670; Referee: Patrik Eriksson

5 March 2016 Matchday 3	GAIS (2)	1–5	BK Forward (3)	Gothenburg
14:00	Mijaljević 68'	Report	Wettéus 29'; Björndahl 39'; Lamu 58'; Carlsson 84'; Björndahl 86'	Stadium: Valhalla IP; Attendance: 800; Referee: Jim Peterssom

5 March 2016 Matchday 3	Helsingborgs IF (1)	1–1	Örebro SK (1)	Helsingborg
14:00	Hallenius 16'	Report	Crespo 12'	Stadium: Olympiafältet; Attendance: 1,335; Referee: Kaspar Sjöberg

== Knockout stage ==
=== Qualified teams ===
Pos	Grp	Team	Pld	W	D	L	GF	GA	GD	Pts	Qualification
1	3	AIK	3	3	0	0	10	2	+8	9	Seeded in Quarter-final draw
2	5	Malmö FF	3	3	0	0	10	2	+8	9	Seeded in Quarter-final draw
3	4	Kalmar FF	3	3	0	0	6	2	+4	9	Seeded in Quarter-final draw
4	7	BK Häcken	3	2	1	0	10	2	+8	7	Seeded in Quarter-final draw
5	1	IFK Norrköping	3	2	1	0	6	1	+5	7	Unseeded in Quarter-final draw
6	6	Hammarby IF	3	2	1	0	7	3	+4	7	Unseeded in Quarter-final draw
7	8	Helsingborgs IF	3	2	1	0	5	2	+3	7	Unseeded in Quarter-final draw
8	2	Halmstads BK	3	2	0	1	5	3	+2	6	Unseeded in Quarter-final draw

Source: Group results
Rules for classification: 1) Points; 2) Goal difference; 3) Goals scored; 4) Ranking in 2015 season

=== Bracket ===
Quarter-finals
13 March – Kalmar
Kalmar FF (p)	0 (5)
Helsingborgs IF	0 (4)
13 March – Malmö
Malmö FF	1
IFK Norrköping	0
15 March – Solna
AIK	1 (2)
Hammarby IF (p)	1 (4)
12 March – Gothenburg
BK Häcken	1
Halmstads BK	0

Semi-finals
19 March – Kalmar
Kalmar FF	2
Malmö FF	3
20 March – Stockholm
Hammarby IF	2
BK Häcken	3

Final
5 May – Malmö
Malmö FF	2 (5)
BK Häcken (p)	2 (6)

=== Quarter-finals ===
The quarter-finals consists of the eight teams that won their respective group in the previous round and the four best group winners were seeded and drawn against the other four group winners, with the seeded teams entitled to play the match at their home venue. Halmstads BK are the only team in the quarter-finals that will not play in the top tier, Allsvenskan, for the 2016 season as they will play in the second tier, Superettan.

The draw for the quarter-finals was held on 7 March and the quarter-final matches were played on 12, 13 and 15 March 2016.

12 March 2016	BK Häcken (1)	1–0	Halmstads BK (2)	Gothenburg
16:00	Jeremejeff 90+2'	Report		Stadium: Bravida Arena; Attendance: 1,427; Referee: Andreas Ekberg

13 March 2016	Malmö FF (1)	1–0	IFK Norrköping (1)	Malmö
14:30	Kjartansson 47'	Report		Stadium: Malmö IP; Referee: Mohammed Al-Hakim

13 March 2016	Kalmar FF (1)	0–0 (a.e.t.) (5–4 p)	Helsingborgs IF (1)	Kalmar
14:30		Report		Stadium: Gasten IP; Referee: Stefan Johannesson
	Penalties
	Elm (penalty scored); Eriksson (penalty scored); Antonsson (penalty scored); Hedlund (penalty scored); Lima (penalty scored)		A. Wede (penalty scored); Larsson (penalty missed); Hallenius (penalty scored); C. Wede (penalty scored); Eriksson (penalty scored)

15 March 2016	AIK (1)	1–1 (a.e.t.) (2–4 p)	Hammarby IF (1)	Solna
18:30	Hooiveld 61'	Report	Smárason 45'	Stadium: Friends Arena; Attendance: 23,860; Referee: Mohammed Al-Hakim
	Penalties
	Ahmed (penalty scored); Hooiveld (penalty missed); Johansson (penalty scored); Markkanen (penalty missed)		Haglund (penalty missed); Smárason (penalty scored); Khalili (penalty scored); Alex (penalty scored); Kristinsson (penalty scored)

=== Semi-finals ===
The semi-finals consist of the four winners from the quarter-finals. The draw will be a free draw and the first drawn team in each pairing play the match at their home venue.

The draw for the semi-finals was held on 8 March and the semi-final matches be played on 19 and 20 March 2016.

19 March 2016	Kalmar FF (1)	2–3	Malmö FF (1)	Kalmar
13:30	Romário 11'; Antonsson 90'	Report	Rosenberg 57', 60'; Berget 63'	Stadium: Guldfågeln Arena; Referee: Bojan Pandzic

20 March 2016	Hammarby IF (1)	2–3	BK Häcken (1)	Stockholm
19:00	Alex 3'; Hallberg 86'	Report	Paulinho 58', 67'; Mohammed 89'	Stadium: Tele2 Arena; Attendance: 13,788; Referee: Johan Hamlin

=== Final ===
The final will be played on 5 May 2016. The home team was determined with a draw held on 21 March.

5 May 2016
15:30 CEST (UTC+2)

Malmö FF (1)	2–2 (a.e.t.)	BK Häcken (1)
Rosenberg 39'; Eikrem 44'	Report	Savage 61'; Mohammed 66'
Penalties
Molins (penalty scored); Sana (penalty scored); Berget (penalty scored); Christiansen (penalty scored); Rakip (penalty missed); Arnason (penalty scored); Tinnerholm (penalty missed)	5–6	(penalty scored) Savage; (penalty missed) Makondele; (penalty scored) Gustafson; (penalty scored) Mohammed; (penalty scored) Paulinho; (penalty scored) Arkivuo; (penalty scored) Sandberg

Swedbank Stadion, Malmö
Attendance: 22,302
Referee: Andreas Ekberg

== Top scorers ==
As of 20 March 2016

Rank	Player	Club	Goals
1	(Norway) Jo Inge Berget	Malmö FF	7
1	(Brazil) Paulinho	BK Häcken	7
3	(Sweden) Erik Björndahl	BK Forward	5
4	(Sweden) Sebastian Andersson	Djurgårdens IF	4
4	(Sweden) Alexander Jeremejeff	BK Häcken	4
4	(Sweden) Nahom Girmai Netabay	Kristianstads FF	4
4	(Sweden) Victor Sköld	IFK Göteborg	4
