= 2015 CAF Champions League qualifying rounds =

- Dates: 13 February – 3 May 2015

The 2015 CAF Champions League qualifying rounds were played from 13 February to 3 May 2015. A total of 57 teams competed in the qualifying rounds to decide the eight places in the group stage of the 2015 CAF Champions League.

== Draw ==
The draw for the preliminary, first and second qualifying rounds was held on 22 December 2014 at the CAF headquarters in Cairo, Egypt. The entry round of each team was determined by their ranking points calculated based on performances in continental club championships for the period 2010–2014.

The following 57 teams were entered into the draw:

Byes to first round	Entrants to preliminary round
(Egypt) Al-Ahly (62 pts); (Tunisia) Espérance de Tunis (48 pts); (Democratic Republic of the Congo) TP Mazembe (41 pts); (Tunisia) CS Sfaxien (34 pts); (Algeria) ES Sétif (31 pts); (Cameroon) Coton Sport (26 pts); (Republic of the Congo) AC Léopards (26 pts)	(Sudan) Al-Hilal (24 pts); (Ivory Coast) Séwé Sport (23 pts); (Mali) Stade Malien (11 pts); (Nigeria) Enyimba (6 pts); (Sudan) Al-Merrikh (6 pts); (Angola) Recreativo do Libolo (4 pts); (Ethiopia) Saint George (4 pts); (Morocco) Raja Casablanca (2 pts); (Egypt) Smouha; (Democratic Republic of the Congo) SM Sanga Balende; (Morocco) Moghreb Tétouan; (Nigeria) Kano Pillars; (Algeria) USM Alger; (Algeria) MC El Eulma; (Mali) Club Olympique de Bamako; (Cameroon) Cosmos de Bafia; (Republic of the Congo) Diables Noirs; (South Africa) Mamelodi Sundowns; (South Africa) Kaizer Chiefs; (Angola) Kabuscorp; (Ghana) Asante Kotoko; (Libya) Al-Ahli Tripoli; (Zambia) ZESCO United; (Niger) AS GNN; (Benin) Buffles du Borgou; (Botswana) Township Rollers; (Burkina Faso) Étoile Filante; (Burundi) LLB Académic; (Chad) Foullah Edifice; (Comoros) Fomboni Club; (Equatorial Guinea) Sony Elá Nguema; (Gabon) AS Mangasport; (The Gambia) Real Banjul; (Guinea) AS Kaloum; (Kenya) Gor Mahia; (Lesotho) Bantu; (Liberia) Barrack Young Controllers; (Madagascar) CNaPS Sport; (Malawi) Big Bullets; (Mozambique) Liga Muçulmana; (Rwanda) APR; (Senegal) AS Pikine; (Seychelles) St Michel United; (Sierra Leone) East End Lions; (South Sudan) Al-Malakia; (Eswatini) Mbabane Swallows; (Tanzania) Azam; (Togo) AC Semassi; (Uganda) Kampala City Council; (Zanzibar) KMKM

== Format ==
Qualification ties were played on a home-and-away two-legged basis. If the aggregate score was tied after the second leg, the away goals rule would be applied, and if still level, the penalty shoot-out would be used to determine the winner (no extra time would be played).

== Schedule ==
The schedule of each round was as follows.

Round	First leg	Second leg
Preliminary round	13–15 February 2015	27 February–1 March 2015
First round	13–15 March 2015	3–5 April 2015
Second round	17–19 April 2015	1–3 May 2015

== Bracket ==
The eight winners of the second round advanced to the group stage, while the eight losers of the second round entered the Confederation Cup play-off round.

Preliminary round
(Algeria) USM Alger	3	1	4
(Chad) Foullah Edifice	0	3	3
(Senegal) AS Pikine	1	0	1
(Burkina Faso) Étoile Filante	0	0	0
(Eswatini) Mbabane Swallows	1	0	1
(Zambia) ZESCO United	1	1	2
(Ivory Coast) Séwé Sport	1	1	2
(Guinea) AS Kaloum	2	1	3

First round
(Algeria) USM Alger	5	1	6
(Senegal) AS Pikine	1	1	2
(Zambia) ZESCO United	1	1	2(4)
(Guinea) AS Kaloum (pen.)	1	1	2(5)

Second round
(Algeria) USM Alger	2	1	3
(Guinea) AS Kaloum	1	1	2

Preliminary round
(Cameroon) Coton Sport	—	—	—
Bye	—	—	—
(Angola) Recreativo do Libolo	3	0	3
(Democratic Republic of the Congo) SM Sanga Balende (a)	1	2	3
(Sudan) Al-Hilal	2	0	2
(Zanzibar) KMKM	0	1	1
(Comoros) Fomboni Club	0	2	2
(Malawi) Big Bullets	1	2	3

First round
(Cameroon) Coton Sport	0	0	0
(Democratic Republic of the Congo) SM Sanga Balende	0	2	2
(Sudan) Al-Hilal	4	1	5
(Malawi) Big Bullets	0	1	1

Second round
(Democratic Republic of the Congo) SM Sanga Balende	0	0	0
(Sudan) Al-Hilal	1	1	2

Preliminary round
(Tanzania) Azam	2	0	2
(Sudan) Al-Merrikh	0	3	3
(Burundi) LLB Académic	0	0	0
(Angola) Kabuscorp	0	1	1
(Uganda) Kampala City Council	1	0	1
(Cameroon) Cosmos de Bafia	0	3	3
(Tunisia) Espérance de Tunis	—	—	—
Bye	—	—	—

First round
(Sudan) Al-Merrikh	2	1	3
(Angola) Kabuscorp	0	2	2
(Cameroon) Cosmos de Bafia	0	1	1
(Tunisia) Espérance de Tunis	1	3	4

Second round
(Sudan) Al-Merrikh (a)	1	1	2
(Tunisia) Espérance de Tunis	0	2	2

Preliminary round
(Algeria) MC El Eulma (a)	1	1	2
(Ethiopia) Saint George	0	2	2
(Sierra Leone) East End Lions	—	—	—
(Ghana) Asante Kotoko (w/o)	—	—	—
(Equatorial Guinea) Sony Elá Nguema	1	0	1
(Togo) AC Semassi	1	1	2
(Tunisia) CS Sfaxien	—	—	—
Bye	—	—	—

First round
(Algeria) MC El Eulma	0	2	2
(Ghana) Asante Kotoko	0	1	1
(Togo) AC Semassi	0	0	0
(Tunisia) CS Sfaxien	5	1	6

Second round
(Algeria) MC El Eulma (pen.)	1	0	1(7)
(Tunisia) CS Sfaxien	0	1	1(6)

Preliminary round
(Kenya) Gor Mahia (a)	1	2	3
(Madagascar) CNaPS Sport	0	3	3
(Republic of the Congo) AC Léopards	—	—	—
Bye	—	—	—
(Nigeria) Enyimba	3	1	4
(Benin) Buffles du Borgou	0	0	0
(Libya) Al-Ahli Tripoli	1	0	1(3)
(Egypt) Smouha (pen.)	0	1	1(5)

First round
(Kenya) Gor Mahia	0	0	0
(Republic of the Congo) AC Léopards	1	1	2
(Nigeria) Enyimba	1	0	1
(Egypt) Smouha	0	2	2

Second round
(Republic of the Congo) AC Léopards	1	0	1
(Egypt) Smouha	0	2	2

Preliminary round
(Mali) Club Olympique de Bamako	2	0	2
(Morocco) Moghreb Tétouan	0	3	3
(South Sudan) Al-Malakia	0	0	0
(Nigeria) Kano Pillars	2	3	5
(Mozambique) Liga Muçulmana	0	1	1
(Rwanda) APR	0	2	2
(Egypt) Al-Ahly	—	—	—
Bye	—	—	—

First round
(Morocco) Moghreb Tétouan	4	1	5
(Nigeria) Kano Pillars	0	2	2
(Rwanda) APR	0	0	0
(Egypt) Al-Ahly	2	2	4

Second round
(Morocco) Moghreb Tétouan (pen.)	1	0	1(4)
(Egypt) Al-Ahly	0	1	1(3)

Preliminary round
(South Africa) Kaizer Chiefs	2	1	3
(Botswana) Township Rollers	1	0	1
(Morocco) Raja Casablanca	4	2	6
(Republic of the Congo) Diables Noirs	0	2	2
(The Gambia) Real Banjul	1	1	2
(Liberia) Barrack Young Controllers	1	0	1
(Algeria) ES Sétif	—	—	—
Bye	—	—	—

First round
(South Africa) Kaizer Chiefs	0	0	0
(Morocco) Raja Casablanca	1	2	3
(The Gambia) Real Banjul	1	0	1
(Algeria) ES Sétif	1	2	3

Second round
(Morocco) Raja Casablanca	2	2	4(1)
(Algeria) ES Sétif (pen.)	2	2	4(4)

Preliminary round
(Gabon) AS Mangasport	1	0	1
(Lesotho) Bantu	0	0	0
(Mali) Stade Malien (a)	0	1	1
(Niger) AS GNN	0	1	1
(Seychelles) St Michel United	1	0	1
(South Africa) Mamelodi Sundowns	1	3	4
(Democratic Republic of the Congo) TP Mazembe	—	—	—
Bye	—	—	—

First round
(Gabon) AS Mangasport	1	1	2
(Mali) Stade Malien	3	2	5
(South Africa) Mamelodi Sundowns	1	1	2
(Democratic Republic of the Congo) TP Mazembe	0	3	3

Second round
(Mali) Stade Malien	2	1	3
(Democratic Republic of the Congo) TP Mazembe	2	2	4

== Preliminary round ==
The preliminary round included the 50 teams that did not receive byes to the first round.

Team 1	Agg.	Team 2	1st leg	2nd leg
Mbabane Swallows (Eswatini)	1–2	(Zambia) ZESCO United	1–1	0–1
Séwé Sport (Ivory Coast)	2–3	(Guinea) AS Kaloum	1–2	1–1
USM Alger (Algeria)	4–3	(Chad) Foullah Edifice	3–0	1–3
AS Pikine (Senegal)	1–0	(Burkina Faso) Étoile Filante	1–0	0–0
Al-Hilal (Sudan)	2–1	(Zanzibar) KMKM	2–0	0–1
Fomboni Club (Comoros)	2–3	(Malawi) Big Bullets	0–1	2–2
Recreativo do Libolo (Angola)	3–3 (a)	(Democratic Republic of the Congo) SM Sanga Balende	3–1	0–2
Kampala City Council (Uganda)	1–3	(Cameroon) Cosmos de Bafia	1–0	0–3
Azam (Tanzania)	2–3	(Sudan) Al-Merrikh	2–0	0–3
LLB Académic (Burundi)	0–1	(Angola) Kabuscorp	0–0	0–1
Sony Elá Nguema (Equatorial Guinea)	1–2	(Togo) AC Semassi	1–1	0–1
MC El Eulma (Algeria)	2–2 (a)	(Ethiopia) Saint George	1–0	1–2
East End Lions (Sierra Leone)	w/o	(Ghana) Asante Kotoko	—	—
Enyimba (Nigeria)	4–0	(Benin) Buffles du Borgou	3–0	1–0
Al-Ahli Tripoli (Libya)	1–1 (3–5 p)	(Egypt) Smouha	1–0	0–1
Gor Mahia (Kenya)	3–3 (a)	(Madagascar) CNaPS Sport	1–0	2–3
Liga Muçulmana (Mozambique)	1–2	(Rwanda) APR	0–0	1–2
Club Olympique de Bamako (Mali)	2–3	(Morocco) Moghreb Tétouan	2–0	0–3
Al-Malakia (South Sudan)	0–5	(Nigeria) Kano Pillars	0–2	0–3
Real Banjul (The Gambia)	2–1	(Liberia) Barrack Young Controllers	1–1	1–0
Kaizer Chiefs (South Africa)	3–1	(Botswana) Township Rollers	2–1	1–0
Raja Casablanca (Morocco)	6–2	(Republic of the Congo) Diables Noirs	4–0	2–2
St Michel United (Seychelles)	1–4	(South Africa) Mamelodi Sundowns	1–1	0–3
AS Mangasport (Gabon)	1–0	(Lesotho) Bantu	1–0	0–0
Stade Malien (Mali)	1–1 (a)	(Niger) AS GNN	0–0	1–1

15 February 2015
15:30 UTC+2

Mbabane Swallows (Eswatini)	1–1	(Zambia) ZESCO United
Badenhorst 89'	Report	Zulu 44'

Somhlolo National Stadium, Lobamba
Referee: Sentso Mohau (Lesotho)
28 February 2015
15:00 UTC+2

ZESCO United (Zambia)	1–0	(Eswatini) Mbabane Swallows
Zulu 28'	Report

Levy Mwanawasa Stadium, Ndola
Referee: João Goma (Angola)

ZESCO United won 2–1 on aggregate.

14 February 2015
15:30 UTC±0

Séwé Sport (Ivory Coast)	1–2	(Guinea) AS Kaloum
Pathinvo 68'	Report	Ballo 18'; Konté 74'

Stade Robert Champroux, Abidjan
Referee: Daouda Guèye (Senegal)
1 March 2015
17:00 UTC±0

AS Kaloum (Guinea)	1–1	(Ivory Coast) Séwé Sport
Kassongo 44'	Report	Assiri 74'

Stade du 26 Mars, Bamako (Mali)
Referee: Hamidu Bomison (Ghana)

Note: The second leg was played outside of Guinea due to Ebola outbreak.
AS Kaloum won 3–2 on aggregate.

15 February 2015
18:00 UTC+1

USM Alger (Algeria)	3–0	(Chad) Foullah Edifice
Chafaï 4'; Belaïli 56' (pen.); Carolus 90'	Report

Stade Omar Hamadi, Algiers
Referee: Wahid Tamuni (Libya)
1 March 2015
15:00 UTC+1

Foullah Edifice (Chad)	3–1	(Algeria) USM Alger
Kédigui 15'; Dingamnai 19' (pen.); Boudina 58'	Report	Laïfaoui 10'

Stade Omnisports Idriss Mahamat Ouya, N'Djamena
Referee: Ibrahim Mamane (Niger)

USM Alger won 4–3 on aggregate.

14 February 2015
17:00 UTC±0

AS Pikine (Senegal)	1–0	(Burkina Faso) Étoile Filante
Wade 81'	Report

Stade Demba Diop, Dakar
Referee: Fabricio Duarte (Cape Verde)
28 February 2015
16:00 UTC±0

Étoile Filante (Burkina Faso)	0–0	(Senegal) AS Pikine
	Report

Stade du 4 Août, Ouagadougou
Referee: Akintoye Koole (Benin)

AS Pikine won 1–0 on aggregate.

15 February 2015
20:00 UTC+3

Al-Hilal (Sudan)	2–0	(Zanzibar) KMKM
Hamid 27'; Kébé 49'	Report

Al-Hilal Stadium, Omdurman
Referee: Luelseghed Ghebremichael (Eritrea)
28 February 2015
16:30 UTC+3

KMKM (Zanzibar)	1–0	(Sudan) Al-Hilal
Mwalim 69'	Report

Amaan Stadium, Zanzibar City
Referee: Brian Miiro (Uganda)

Al-Hilal won 2–1 on aggregate.

15 February 2015
15:00 UTC+3

Fomboni Club (Comoros)	0–1	(Malawi) Big Bullets
	Report	Kumwenda 90'

Stade de Beaumer, Moroni
Referee: Hubert Andriamiharisoa (Madagascar)
28 February 2015
14:30 UTC+2

Big Bullets (Malawi)	2–2	(Comoros) Fomboni Club
Limbani 35'; Kumwenda 42'	Report	Alphonse 53'; Takfidine 56' (pen.)

Kamuzu Stadium, Blantyre
Referee: Aníbal António (Mozambique)

Big Bullets won 3–2 on aggregate.

14 February 2015
15:00 UTC+1

Recreativo do Libolo (Angola)	3–1	(Democratic Republic of the Congo) SM Sanga Balende
Diawara 13'; Fredy 22'; Dário 44'	Report	Mukundi 58'

Estádio Municipal de Calulo, Calulo
Referee: Lekgotla Johannes (Botswana)
1 March 2015
15:30 UTC+1

SM Sanga Balende (Democratic Republic of the Congo)	2–0	(Angola) Recreativo do Libolo
Mukundi 34' (pen.); Luyindama 41'	Report

Stade Tata Raphaël, Kinshasa
Referee: Gervais Munyanziza (Rwanda)

3–3 on aggregate. SM Sanga Balende won on away goals.

14 February 2015
16:00 UTC+3

Kampala City Council (Uganda)	1–0	(Cameroon) Cosmos de Bafia
Wasswa 82'	Report

Mandela National Stadium, Kampala
Referee: Eric Gasinzigwa (Burundi)
1 March 2015
15:30 UTC+1

Cosmos de Bafia (Cameroon)	3–0	(Uganda) Kampala City Council
Ekamba 31'; Tombi 69', 89'	Report

Stade de la Réunification, Douala
Referee: Jean Marc Ganamandji (Central African Republic)

Cosmos de Bafia won 3–1 on aggregate.

15 February 2015
17:00 UTC+3

Azam (Tanzania)	2–0	(Sudan) Al-Merrikh
Kavumbangu 9'; Bocco 77'	Report

Chamazi Stadium, Dar es Salaam
Referee: Hassan Mohamed Hagi (Somalia)
28 February 2015
20:00 UTC+3

Al-Merrikh (Sudan)	3–0	(Tanzania) Azam
Al-Madina 12'; Abdalla 86'; Wanga 89'	Report

Al-Merrikh Stadium, Omdurman
Referee: Wellington Kaoma (Zambia)

Al-Merrikh won 3–2 on aggregate.

14 February 2015
15:30 UTC+2

LLB Académic (Burundi)	0–0	(Angola) Kabuscorp
	Report

Prince Louis Rwagasore Stadium, Bujumbura
Referee: Sylvester Kirwa (Kenya)
28 February 2015
16:00 UTC+1

Kabuscorp (Angola)	1–0	(Burundi) LLB Académic
Meyong 13'	Report

Estádio dos Coqueiros, Luanda
Referee: Wisdom Chewe (Zambia)

Kabuscorp won 1–0 on aggregate.

15 February 2015
19:00 UTC+1

Sony Elá Nguema (Equatorial Guinea)	1–1	(Togo) AC Semassi
Bikoro 55' (pen.)	Report	Folly-Klan 87'

Estadio Internacional, Malabo
Referee: Messie Nkounkou (Congo)
1 March 2015
15:00 UTC±0

AC Semassi (Togo)	1–0	(Equatorial Guinea) Sony Elá Nguema
Fousseni 88'	Report

Stade Municipal, Lomé
Attendance: 10,000
Referee: Abubakar Ago (Nigeria)

AC Semassi won 2–1 on aggregate.

14 February 2015
18:00 UTC+1

MC El Eulma (Algeria)	1–0	(Ethiopia) Saint George
Hamiti 45' (pen.)	Report

Stade Messaoud Zougar, El Eulma
Referee: Nasrallah Jaouadi (Tunisia)
1 March 2015
16:00 UTC+3

Saint George (Ethiopia)	2–1	(Algeria) MC El Eulma
B. Assefa 45'; Adane 67'	Report	Tembeng 70'

Bahir Dar Stadium, Bahir Dar
Referee: Farah Aden (Djibouti)

2–2 on aggregate. MC El Eulma won on away goals.

13 February 2015

East End Lions (Sierra Leone)	Cancelled	(Ghana) Asante Kotoko
	Report

27 February 2015

Asante Kotoko (Ghana)	Cancelled	(Sierra Leone) East End Lions
	Report

Asante Kotoko won on walkover after East End Lions withdrew.

15 February 2015
16:00 UTC+1

Enyimba (Nigeria)	3–0	(Benin) Buffles du Borgou
Daniel 7'; Sokari 84'; Onyekachi 90'	Report

Enyimba International Stadium, Aba
Referee: Tangba Kambou (Ivory Coast)
1 March 2015
16:00 UTC+1

Buffles du Borgou (Benin)	0–1	(Nigeria) Enyimba
	Report	Abalogu 50'

Stade de l'Amitié, Cotonou
Referee: Louis Sanou (Burkina Faso)

Enyimba won 4–0 on aggregate.

13 February 2015
14:00 UTC+1

Al-Ahli Tripoli (Libya)	1–0	(Egypt) Smouha
Al Ghanodi 49' (pen.)	Report

Stade El Menzah, Tunis (Tunisia)
Referee: Mohamed Benouza (Algeria)
28 February 2015
17:00 UTC+2

Smouha (Egypt)	1–0	(Libya) Al-Ahli Tripoli
Amin 52' (pen.)	Report
Penalties
Farid (penalty scored); Nabil (penalty scored); Said (penalty scored); Al Mounofi (penalty scored); Amin (penalty scored)	5–3	(penalty scored) Al Ghanodi; (penalty scored) H. Elhouni; (penalty scored) Al Ouarfali; (penalty missed) E. El Masry

Alexandria Stadium, Alexandria
Referee: Hicham Tiazi (Morocco)

Note: The first leg was played outside of Libya due to security concerns.
1–1 on aggregate. Smouha won on penalties.

14 February 2015
16:00 UTC+3

Gor Mahia (Kenya)	1–0	(Madagascar) CNaPS Sport
Abondo 3' (pen.)	Report

Nyayo National Stadium, Nairobi
Referee: Mashood Ssali (Uganda)
1 March 2015
14:30 UTC+3

CNaPS Sport (Madagascar)	3–2	(Kenya) Gor Mahia
Ralaidimy 7'; Vombola 36', 44'	Report	Abondo 29'; Odhiambo 88'

Mahamasina Municipal Stadium, Antananarivo
Referee: Nelson Fred (Seychelles)

3–3 on aggregate. Gor Mahia won on away goals.

15 February 2015
15:30 UTC+2

Liga Muçulmana (Mozambique)	0–0	(Rwanda) APR
	Report

Estádio da Matola, Maputo
Referee: Leston Nangombe (Namibia)
28 February 2015
15:30 UTC+2

APR (Rwanda)	2–1	(Mozambique) Liga Muçulmana
Mubumbyi 81'; Mugiraneza 85'	Report	Arnaldo 48'

Amahoro Stadium, Kigali
Referee: Gait Metodious Oting (South Sudan)

APR won 2–1 on aggregate.

13 February 2015
16:00 UTC±0

Club Olympique de Bamako (Mali)	2–0	(Morocco) Moghreb Tétouan
Diarra 51' (pen.), 66'	Report

Stade Modibo Kéïta, Bamako
Referee: Falou Galasse Kane (Senegal)
28 February 2015
18:00 UTC±0

Moghreb Tétouan (Morocco)	3–0	(Mali) Club Olympique de Bamako
Iajour 13'; Abarhoun 25'; Naïm 79'	Report

Stade Saniat Rmel, Tétouan
Referee: Haithem Kossaï (Tunisia)

Moghreb Tétouan won 3–2 on aggregate.

14 February 2015
16:30 UTC+3

Al-Malakia (South Sudan)	0–2	(Nigeria) Kano Pillars
	Report	Gambo 49'; Obiazor 63'

Juba Stadium, Juba
Referee: Lemma Nigussie (Ethiopia)
28 February 2015
16:00 UTC+1

Kano Pillars (Nigeria)	3–0	(South Sudan) Al-Malakia
Gambo 38', 90+2'; Hassan 89'	Report

Sani Abacha Stadium, Kano
Referee: Kossi Azaleko (Togo)

Kano Pillars won 5–0 on aggregate.

14 February 2015
16:00 UTC±0

Real Banjul (The Gambia)	1–1	(Liberia) Barrack Young Controllers
Sawo 82'	Report	Jabateh 3'

Banjul Mini-Stadium, Banjul
Referee: Yakhouba Keita (Guinea)
7 March 2015
16:30 UTC±0

Barrack Young Controllers (Liberia)	0–1	(The Gambia) Real Banjul
	Report	Jarju 30'

Banjul Mini-Stadium, Banjul (Gambia)
Referee: Boubou Traoré (Mali)

Note: The second leg was played outside of Liberia due to Ebola outbreak. The match was scheduled to take place in the Stade du 26 Mars, Bamako (Mali), on 1 March 2015 but the Malian Football Federation eventually did not allow Barrack Young Controllers to play there. The match was moved to take place in the Gambia the following week.
Real Banjul won 2–1 on aggregate.

14 February 2015
19:30 UTC+2

Kaizer Chiefs (South Africa)	2–1	(Botswana) Township Rollers
Rusike 5'; Mashamaite 90+3'	Report	Boy 47'

FNB Stadium, Johannesburg
Referee: Soulaimane Ansudane (Comoros)
28 February 2015
15:00 UTC+2

Township Rollers (Botswana)	0–1	(South Africa) Kaizer Chiefs
	Report	Nkosi 27'

Botswana National Stadium, Gaborone
Referee: Duncan Lengani (Malawi)

Kaizer Chiefs won 3–1 on aggregate.

13 February 2015
20:00 UTC±0

Raja Casablanca (Morocco)	4–0	(Republic of the Congo) Diables Noirs
Guehi 9'; Osaguona 70'; Karrouchy 90'; Jbira 90'	Report

Stade Mohamed V, Casablanca
Referee: Mahmoud Ashour (Egypt)
1 March 2015
15:30 UTC+1

Diables Noirs (Republic of the Congo)	2–2	(Morocco) Raja Casablanca
Ebengo 83' (pen.); Mvete 87'	Report	Mabidé 41'; Osaguona 55'

Stade Municipal, Pointe-Noire
Referee: Mal Mohamadou (Cameroon)

Raja Casablanca won 6–2 on aggregate.

14 February 2015
16:30 UTC+4

St Michel United (Seychelles)	1–1	(South Africa) Mamelodi Sundowns
Fenosoa 71'	Report	Billiat 84'

Stade Linité, Victoria
Referee: Mbongseni Fakudze (Swaziland)
28 February 2015
19:00 UTC+2

Mamelodi Sundowns (South Africa)	3–0	(Seychelles) St Michel United
Moriri 7' (pen.), 52'; Mashego 88'	Report

Lucas Masterpieces Moripe Stadium, Pretoria
Referee: Dharamveer Hurbungs (Mauritius)

Mamelodi Sundowns won 4–1 on aggregate.

14 February 2015
15:30 UTC+1

AS Mangasport (Gabon)	1–0	(Lesotho) Bantu
Bakayoko 42'	Report

Stade Henri Sylvoz, Moanda
Referee: Ditonil da Costa Lima (São Tomé and Príncipe)
1 March 2015
15:30 UTC+2

Bantu (Lesotho)	0–0	(Gabon) AS Mangasport
	Report

Setsoto Stadium, Maseru
Referee: Tinyiko Hlungwani (South Africa)

AS Mangasport won 1–0 on aggregate.

14 February 2015
17:00 UTC±0

Stade Malien (Mali)	0–0	(Niger) AS GNN
	Report

Stade Modibo Kéïta, Bamako
Referee: Gilberto dos Santos (Guinea-Bissau)
27 February 2015
17:00 UTC+1

AS GNN (Niger)	1–1	(Mali) Stade Malien
Talatou 63' (pen.)	Report	Bangoura 82'

Stade Municipal, Niamey
Referee: Bienvenu Sinko (Ivory Coast)

1–1 on aggregate. Stade Malien won on away goals.

== First round ==
The first round included 32 teams: the 25 winners of the preliminary round, and the 7 teams that received byes to this round.

Team 1	Agg.	Team 2	1st leg	2nd leg
ZESCO United (Zambia)	2–2 (4–5 p)	(Guinea) AS Kaloum	1–1	1–1
USM Alger (Algeria)	6–2	(Senegal) AS Pikine	5–1	1–1
Al-Hilal (Sudan)	5–1	(Malawi) Big Bullets	4–0	1–1
Coton Sport (Cameroon)	0–2	(Democratic Republic of the Congo) SM Sanga Balende	0–0	0–2
Cosmos de Bafia (Cameroon)	1–4	(Tunisia) Espérance de Tunis	0–1	1–3
Al-Merrikh (Sudan)	3–2	(Angola) Kabuscorp	2–0	1–2
AC Semassi (Togo)	0–6	(Tunisia) CS Sfaxien	0–5	0–1
MC El Eulma (Algeria)	2–1	(Ghana) Asante Kotoko	0–0	2–1
Enyimba (Nigeria)	1–2	(Egypt) Smouha	1–0	0–2
Gor Mahia (Kenya)	0–2	(Republic of the Congo) AC Léopards	0–1	0–1
APR (Rwanda)	0–4	(Egypt) Al-Ahly	0–2	0–2
Moghreb Tétouan (Morocco)	5–2	(Nigeria) Kano Pillars	4–0	1–2
Real Banjul (The Gambia)	1–3	(Algeria) ES Sétif	1–1	0–2
Kaizer Chiefs (South Africa)	0–3	(Morocco) Raja Casablanca	0–1	0–2
Mamelodi Sundowns (South Africa)	2–3	(Democratic Republic of the Congo) TP Mazembe	1–0	1–3
AS Mangasport (Gabon)	2–5	(Mali) Stade Malien	1–3	1–2

14 March 2015
15:00 UTC+2

ZESCO United (Zambia)	1–1	(Guinea) AS Kaloum
Zulu 90+3'	Report	Soumah 58'

Levy Mwanawasa Stadium, Ndola
Referee: Israel Mujuni (Tanzania)
5 April 2015
17:00 UTC±0

AS Kaloum (Guinea)	1–1	(Zambia) ZESCO United
Kassongo 77' (pen.)	Report	Zulu 41'
Penalties
Kassongo (penalty scored); Diawara (penalty scored); Thiam (penalty scored); Camara (penalty scored); Banh (penalty scored)	5–4	(penalty scored) Ching'andu; (penalty scored) Chaila; (penalty scored) Oluwafemi; (penalty scored) Zulu; (penalty missed) Mwanza

Stade du 26 Mars, Bamako (Mali)
Referee: Noureddine El Jaafari (Morocco)

Note: The second leg was played outside of Guinea due to Ebola outbreak.
2–2 on aggregate. AS Kaloum won on penalties.

15 March 2015
18:00 UTC+1

USM Alger (Algeria)	5–1	(Senegal) AS Pikine
Bouchema 12'; Beldjilali 22'; Meftah 53' (pen.), 81'; Belaïli 70'	Report	Niang 10'

Stade Omar Hamadi, Algiers
Referee: Mahmoud El Banna (Egypt)
3 April 2015
15:30 UTC±0

AS Pikine (Senegal)	1–1	(Algeria) USM Alger
Sow 26'	Report	Koudri 79'

Stade Demba Diop, Dakar
Referee: Cecil Fleischer (Ghana)

USM Alger won 6–2 on aggregate.

15 March 2015
20:00 UTC+3

Al-Hilal (Sudan)	4–0	(Malawi) Big Bullets
Careca 9', 48'; Kébé 12'; Hamid 84'	Report

Al-Hilal Stadium, Omdurman
Referee: Hudu Munyemana (Rwanda)
5 April 2015
14:30 UTC+2

Big Bullets (Malawi)	1–1	(Sudan) Al-Hilal
Chilapondwa 75' (pen.)	Report	Kebé 78'

Kamuzu Stadium, Blantyre
Referee: Victor Gomes (South Africa)

Al-Hilal won 5–1 on aggregate.

14 March 2015
15:30 UTC+1

Coton Sport (Cameroon)	0–0	(Democratic Republic of the Congo) SM Sanga Balende
	Report

Roumdé Adjia Stadium, Garoua
Referee: Joshua Amao (Nigeria)
5 April 2015
15:30 UTC+1

SM Sanga Balende (Democratic Republic of the Congo)	2–0	(Cameroon) Coton Sport
Mukundi 80' (pen.); Mpongo 86'	Report

Stade Tata Raphaël, Kinshasa
Referee: Sylvester Kirwa (Kenya)

SM Sanga Balende won 2–0 on aggregate.

15 March 2015
15:30 UTC+1

Cosmos de Bafia (Cameroon)	0–1	(Tunisia) Espérance de Tunis
	Report	Afful 89'

Stade de la Réunification, Douala
Referee: Hélder Martins de Carvalho (Angola)
5 April 2015
17:00 UTC+1

Espérance de Tunis (Tunisia)	3–1	(Cameroon) Cosmos de Bafia
N'Djeng 32' (pen.), 44' (pen.); Chaalali 67'	Report	Chaalali 28' (o.g.)

Stade Olympique de Radès, Radès
Referee: Mahamadou Keita (Mali)

Espérance de Tunis won 4–1 on aggregate.

14 March 2015
20:00 UTC+3

Al-Merrikh (Sudan)	2–0	(Angola) Kabuscorp
Abdalla 16'; Coffie 49'	Report

Al-Merrikh Stadium, Omdurman
Referee: Abdallah Baesus Ashraf (Libya)
4 April 2015
16:00 UTC+1

Kabuscorp (Angola)	2–1	(Sudan) Al-Merrikh
Mputu 40'; Meyong 83'	Report	Al-Madina 76'

Estádio dos Coqueiros, Luanda
Referee: Jackson Pavaza (Namibia)

Al-Merrikh won 3–2 on aggregate.

15 March 2015
15:30 UTC±0

AC Semassi (Togo)	0–5	(Tunisia) CS Sfaxien
	Report	Egbuna 9' (o.g.); Moncer 19'; Khenissi 77'; Hkimi 86'; Maâloul 89'

Stade de Kégué, Lomé
Referee: Samuel Chirindza (Mozambique)
5 April 2015
18:00 UTC+1

CS Sfaxien (Tunisia)	1–0	(Togo) AC Semassi
Noubissi 2'	Report

Stade Taïeb Mhiri, Sfax
Referee: Bakary Gassama (Gambia)

CS Sfaxien won 6–0 on aggregate.

14 March 2015
17:00 UTC+1

MC El Eulma (Algeria)	0–0	(Ghana) Asante Kotoko
	Report

Stade Messaoud Zougar, El Eulma
Referee: Néant Alioum (Cameroon)
5 April 2015
15:00 UTC±0

Asante Kotoko (Ghana)	1–2	(Algeria) MC El Eulma
Owusu 41'	Report	Derrardja 61'; Hamiti 89'

Baba Yara Stadium, Kumasi
Referee: El Fadil Mohamed (Sudan)

MC El Eulma won 2–1 on aggregate.

15 March 2015
16:00 UTC+1

Enyimba (Nigeria)	1–0	(Egypt) Smouha
Boumsong 56'	Report

Enyimba International Stadium, Aba
Referee: Daniel Bennett (South Africa)
5 April 2015
17:00 UTC+2

Smouha (Egypt)	2–0	(Nigeria) Enyimba
El-Agazy 85' (pen.); Kouao 90'	Report

Alexandria Stadium, Alexandria
Referee: Slim Belkhouas (Tunisia)

Smouha won 2–1 on aggregate.

15 March 2015
16:00 UTC+3

Gor Mahia (Kenya)	0–1	(Republic of the Congo) AC Léopards
	Report	Gandzé 48'

Nyayo National Stadium, Nairobi
Referee: Parmendra Nunkoo (Mauritius)
5 April 2015
15:30 UTC+1

AC Léopards (Republic of the Congo)	1–0	(Kenya) Gor Mahia
Gandzé 42'	Report

Stade Denis Sassou Nguesso, Dolisie
Referee: Louis Hakizimana (Rwanda)

AC Léopards won 2–0 on aggregate.

14 March 2015
15:30 UTC+2

APR (Rwanda)	0–2	(Egypt) Al-Ahly
	Report	Moteab 66'; Soliman 83'

Amahoro Stadium, Kigali
Referee: Janny Sikazwe (Zambia)
4 April 2015
19:00 UTC+2

Al-Ahly (Egypt)	2–0	(Rwanda) APR
Zakaria 29', 48'	Report

Petro Sport Stadium, Cairo
Referee: Luelseghed Ghebremichael (Eritrea)

Al-Ahly won 4–0 on aggregate.

21 March 2015
20:00 UTC±0

Moghreb Tétouan (Morocco)	4–0	(Nigeria) Kano Pillars
Iajour 14', 26', 35'; Krouch 90'	Report

Stade Saniat Rmel, Tétouan
Referee: António Rodrigues (Cape Verde)
4 April 2015
16:00 UTC+1

Kano Pillars (Nigeria)	2–1	(Morocco) Moghreb Tétouan
Edjomariegwe 59'; Ali 90'	Report	Iajour 33'

Sani Abacha Stadium, Kano
Referee: Kouamé N'Dri (Ivory Coast)

Note: The first leg was postponed by a week after five Kano Pillars players were wounded in a shooting on 5 March 2015.
Moghreb Tétouan won 5–2 on aggregate.

14 March 2015
16:30 UTC±0

Real Banjul (The Gambia)	1–1	(Algeria) ES Sétif
Jallow 51'	Report	Bouchar 71'

Box Bar Mini-Stadium, Brikama
Referee: Ali Lemghaifry (Mauritania)
3 April 2015
18:00 UTC+1

ES Sétif (Algeria)	2–0	(The Gambia) Real Banjul
Zerara 20'; Mellouli 47'	Report

Stade 8 Mai 1945, Sétif
Referee: Denis Dembélé (Ivory Coast)

ES Sétif won 3–1 on aggregate.

14 March 2015
19:00 UTC+2

Kaizer Chiefs (South Africa)	0–1	(Morocco) Raja Casablanca
	Report	Osaguona 6'

Moses Mabhida Stadium, Durban
Referee: Eric Otogo-Castane (Gabon)
5 April 2015
19:00 UTC+1

Raja Casablanca (Morocco)	2–0	(South Africa) Kaizer Chiefs
Osaguona 86', 90+3'	Report

Stade Mohamed V, Casablanca
Referee: Malang Diedhiou (Senegal)

Raja Casablanca won 3–0 on aggregate.

14 March 2015
19:00 UTC+2

Mamelodi Sundowns (South Africa)	1–0	(Democratic Republic of the Congo) TP Mazembe
Billiat 86'	Report

Loftus Versfeld Stadium, Pretoria
Referee: Hamada Nampiandraza (Madagascar)
5 April 2015
15:30 UTC+2

TP Mazembe (Democratic Republic of the Congo)	3–1	(South Africa) Mamelodi Sundowns
Kalaba 37'; Samatta 44'; Assalé 56'	Report	Tau 85'

Stade TP Mazembe, Lubumbashi
Referee: Bamlak Tessema Weyesa (Ethiopia)

TP Mazembe won 3–2 on aggregate.

14 March 2015
15:30 UTC+1

AS Mangasport (Gabon)	1–3	(Mali) Stade Malien
Yakouya 71' (pen.)	Report	Cissé 12', 75'; Sissoko 46'

Stade Henri Sylvoz, Moanda
Referee: Jean Marc Ganamandji (Central African Republic)
4 April 2015
17:00 UTC±0

Stade Malien (Mali)	2–1	(Gabon) AS Mangasport
Ma. Coulibaly 19'; Traoré 24'	Report	N'Gouan 4'

Stade Modibo Kéïta, Bamako
Referee: Ferdinand Udoh (Nigeria)

Stade Malien won 5–2 on aggregate.

== Second round ==
The second round included the 16 winners of the first round.

Team 1	Agg.	Team 2	1st leg	2nd leg
USM Alger (Algeria)	3–2	(Guinea) AS Kaloum	2–1	1–1
SM Sanga Balende (Democratic Republic of the Congo)	0–2	(Sudan) Al-Hilal	0–1	0–1
Al-Merrikh (Sudan)	2–2 (a)	(Tunisia) Espérance de Tunis	1–0	1–2
MC El Eulma (Algeria)	1–1 (7–6 p)	(Tunisia) CS Sfaxien	1–0	0–1
AC Léopards (Republic of the Congo)	1–2	(Egypt) Smouha	1–0	0–2
Moghreb Tétouan (Morocco)	1–1 (4–3 p)	(Egypt) Al-Ahly	1–0	0–1
Raja Casablanca (Morocco)	4–4 (1–4 p)	(Algeria) ES Sétif	2–2	2–2
Stade Malien (Mali)	3–4	(Democratic Republic of the Congo) TP Mazembe	2–2	1–2

19 April 2015
18:00 UTC+1

USM Alger (Algeria)	2–1	(Guinea) AS Kaloum
Chafaï 45'; Benmoussa 58'	Report	Kassongo 51'

Stade Omar Hamadi, Algiers
Referee: Juste Ephrem Zio (Burkina Faso)
3 May 2015
16:30 UTC±0

AS Kaloum (Guinea)	1–1	(Algeria) USM Alger
Sylla 75'	Report	Carolus 54'

Stade Modibo Kéïta, Bamako (Mali)
Referee: Mutaz Khairalla (Sudan)

Note: The second leg was played outside of Guinea due to Ebola outbreak.
USM Alger won 3–2 on aggregate.

19 April 2015
15:30 UTC+1

SM Sanga Balende (Democratic Republic of the Congo)	0–1	(Sudan) Al-Hilal
	Report	Masawi 87'

Stade Tata Raphaël, Kinshasa
Referee: Gehad Grisha (Egypt)
3 May 2015
20:00 UTC+3

Al-Hilal (Sudan)	1–0	(Democratic Republic of the Congo) SM Sanga Balende
Masawi 60'	Report

Al-Hilal Stadium, Omdurman
Referee: Mehdi Abid Charef (Algeria)

Al-Hilal won 2–0 on aggregate.

18 April 2015
20:00 UTC+3

Al-Merrikh (Sudan)	1–0	(Tunisia) Espérance de Tunis
Yousif 24' (pen.)	Report

Al-Merrikh Stadium, Omdurman
Referee: Joshua Bondo (Botswana)
3 May 2015
16:00 UTC+1

Espérance de Tunis (Tunisia)	2–1	(Sudan) Al-Merrikh
N'Djeng 69'; Jabeur 90+1'	Report	Abdalla 14'

Stade Olympique de Radès, Radès
Referee: Daniel Bennett (South Africa)

2–2 on aggregate. Al-Merrikh won on away goals.

19 April 2015
18:00 UTC+1

MC El Eulma (Algeria)	1–0	(Tunisia) CS Sfaxien
Derrardja 27'	Report

Stade Messaoud Zougar, El Eulma
Referee: Malang Diedhiou (Senegal)
3 May 2015
19:15 UTC+1

CS Sfaxien (Tunisia)	1–0	(Algeria) MC El Eulma
Hannachi 46'	Report
Penalties
Maâloul (penalty scored); Louati (penalty scored); Meriah (penalty scored); Khenissi (penalty scored); Hannachi (penalty scored); El Bahri (penalty scored); Challouf (penalty missed)	6–7	(penalty scored) Hamiti; (penalty scored) Derrardja; (penalty scored) Belhadi; (penalty scored) Abbes; (penalty scored) Namane; (penalty scored) Maïza; (penalty scored) Mbingui

Stade Taïeb Mhiri, Sfax
Referee: Bamlak Tessema Weyesa (Ethiopia)

1–1 on aggregate. MC El Eulma won on penalties.

19 April 2015
15:30 UTC+1

AC Léopards (Republic of the Congo)	1–0	(Egypt) Smouha
Ndey 31'	Report

Stade Denis Sassou Nguesso, Dolisie
Referee: Aboubacar Bangoura (Guinea)
2 May 2015
18:00 UTC+2

Smouha (Egypt)	2–0	(Republic of the Congo) AC Léopards
Shoukry 24'; El-Agazy 90'	Report

Alexandria Stadium, Alexandria
Referee: Mahamadou Keita (Mali)

Smouha won 2–1 on aggregate.

19 April 2015
20:30 UTC+1

Moghreb Tétouan (Morocco)	1–0	(Egypt) Al-Ahly
Iajour 90'	Report

Stade Saniat Rmel, Tétouan
Referee: Bakary Gassama (Gambia)
2 May 2015
19:00 UTC+2

Al-Ahly (Egypt)	1–0	(Morocco) Moghreb Tétouan
Said 42'	Report
Penalties
Zakaria (penalty scored); Said (penalty scored); Trezeguet (penalty missed); Sobhi (penalty scored); Ghaly (penalty missed)	3–4	(penalty scored) Iajour; (penalty scored) Hidalgo; (penalty scored) Rafik; (penalty scored) El Maimouni

Petro Sport Stadium, Cairo
Referee: Eric Otogo-Castane (Gabon)

1–1 on aggregate. Moghreb Tétouan won on penalties.

19 April 2015
18:30 UTC+1

Raja Casablanca (Morocco)	2–2	(Algeria) ES Sétif
Salhi 48'; Karrouchy 74' (pen.)	Report	Benyettou 45+2', 65'

Stade Mohamed V, Casablanca
Referee: Joseph Lamptey (Ghana)
1 May 2015
18:00 UTC+1

ES Sétif (Algeria)	2–2	(Morocco) Raja Casablanca
Belameiri 7'; Delhoum 47'	Report	Hafidi 58'; Karrouchy 90+3'
Penalties
Delhoum (penalty scored); Benyettou (penalty scored); Zerara (penalty scored); Lamri (penalty scored)	4–1	(penalty missed) Guehi; (penalty missed) Hafidi; (penalty scored) Salhi

Stade 8 Mai 1945, Sétif
Referee: Mohamed Said Kordi (Tunisia)

4–4 on aggregate. ES Sétif won on penalties.

18 April 2015
17:00 UTC±0

Stade Malien (Mali)	2–2	(Democratic Republic of the Congo) TP Mazembe
Koné 75', 77'	Report	Traoré 26'; Adjei 51'

Stade Modibo Kéïta, Bamako
Referee: Bouchaïb El Ahrach (Morocco)
3 May 2015
15:30 UTC+2

TP Mazembe (Democratic Republic of the Congo)	2–1	(Mali) Stade Malien
Kasusula 20'; Assalé 67'	Report	Diabaté 62'

Stade TP Mazembe, Lubumbashi
Referee: Janny Sikazwe (Zambia)

TP Mazembe won 4–3 on aggregate.
