= Tenhults IBK =

Former floorball club in Tenhult, Sweden

- Full name: Tenhults innebandyklubb
- Short name: TIBK
- Founded: 1988
- Arena: Jönköpings idrottshus

Tenhults IBK was a floorball club in Tenhult, Sweden, established 1988.

The men's team played in the Swedish top division during the 1989-1990 season.

Later, Tenhults IF began to play floorball instead.
