= Grällsta Runestone =

Archeological site in Sweden dating to the Viking Age

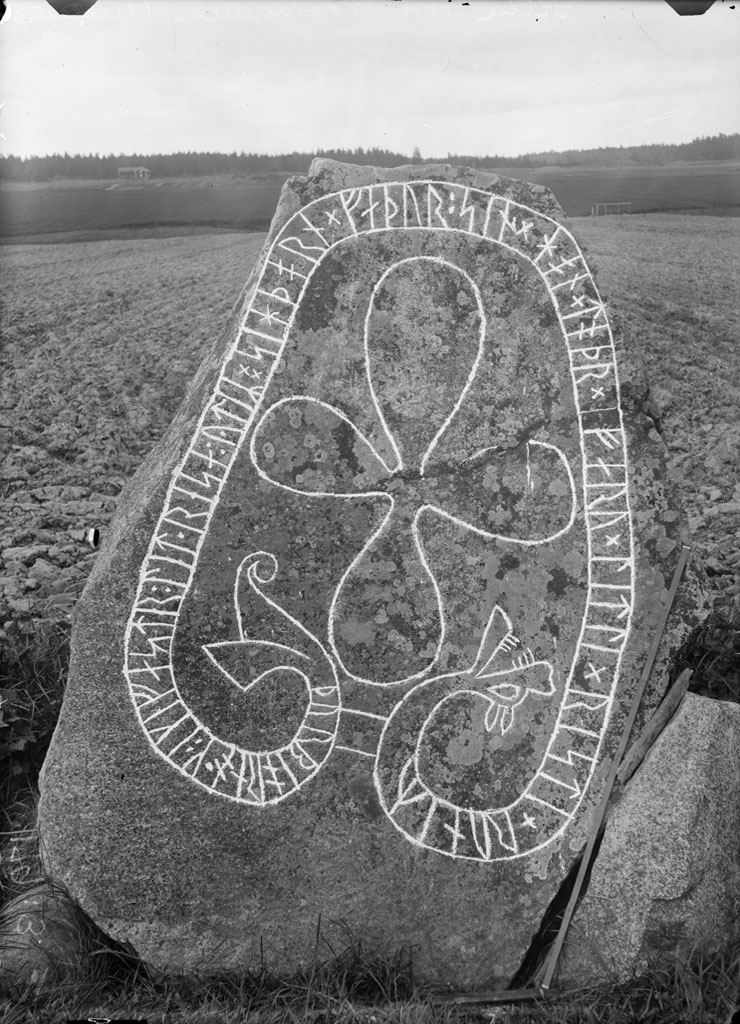
Photograph of Vs 27 taken around 1900.

The Grällsta Runestone, listed as Västmanland Runic Inscription 27 or Vs 27 in the Rundata catalog, is a Viking Age memorial runestone located in Grällsta, which is about nine kilometers northeast of Ransta, Västmanland County, Sweden, which was in the historic province of Västmanland. A second runestone that has been designated as Västmanland Runic Inscription 28 or Vs 28 was once located in Grällsta, but it is now considered to be lost.

== Description ==
The inscription on Vs 27 consists of runic text in the Younger Futhark carved on a serpent encircling a cross. The inscription, measuring 1.75 metres in height and carved on granite, is stylistically classified as Pr5, also known as the Urnes style. This style is characterized by slender, highly stylized animals interwoven into tight patterns, with heads typically shown in profile, featuring almond-shaped eyes and upward-curving extensions on the nose and neck.

Based on stylistic analysis, the carving is attributed to a runemaster known by the normalized name Litle, who also signed the inscription on Vs 20 in Prästgården (Romfartuna parish) and possibly Vs 28. Additional inscriptions attributed to Litle include Vs 17 in Råby, Vs 22 in Ulvsta, and Vs 32 in Prästgården (Västerfärnebo parish).

The runic text states that the stone was raised by two brothers named Þorbjôrn and Ingifastr in memory of their father Sigþorn, who is stated as having died while on a voyage. This runestone belongs to a group of inscriptions that make a public announcement of a death that occurred while traveling, perhaps to allow property to be distributed as inheritance. Other inscriptions making such a general statement of a non-local death include Sö 49 in Ene, Sö 217 in Berga, Sm 48 in Torp, U 258 in Fresta, the now-lost U 349 in Odenslunda, the now-lost U 363 in Gådersta, U 948 in Danmarks, Vs 22 in Ulvsta, Nä 29 in Apelboda, DR 330 in Gårdstånga, and DR 379 in Ny Larsker. It has been suggested that the joint listing of the brothers may indicate that they held the inheritance from their father jointly and without dividing it into separate households.

== Inscription ==
=== Transliteration of the runes into Latin characters ===
þurbiorn ok : ikifastr : lit * resa : ytiʀ ¤ sihþorn × faþur : sin × hon × toþr × [i] faru × litli × risti × runiʀ

=== Transcription into Old Norse ===
Þorbiorn ok Ingifastr letu ræisa æftiʀ Sigþorn, faður sinn. Hann [varð] dauðr i faru. Litli risti runiʀ.

=== Translation in English ===
Þorbjôrn and Ingifastr had (the stone) raised in memory of Sigþorn, their father. He died on a voyage. Litli carved the runes.

== Vs 28 ==
A second runestone was noted as being located in Grällsta, but it has been considered to be lost since around 1800. The inscription has been given the Rundata listing of Vs 28 and is considered to have been a runestone fragment. Records indicate that the damaged text stated that someone ordered a bridge to be constructed. Vs is believed to also have been carved by the runemaster Litle.

=== Inscription ===
==== Transliteration of the runes into Latin characters ====
[...--eʀ * baþ : bru kera : r... ...-ʀi]

==== Transcription into Old Norse ====
... bað bro gærva ... ...

==== Translation in English ====
... ordered the bridge be made ... ...
