= Barnabé Mubumbyi =

Rwandan footballer

Personal information
- Date of birth: 24 July 1994 (age 32)
- Place of birth: Kigali, Rwanda
- Height: 1.85 m (6 ft 1 in)
- Position: Forward

Team information
- Current team: Helges IF

Senior career*
Years	Team	Apps	(Gls)
2012–2016	APR		
2016–2017	AS Kigali		
2017–2018	Bugesera		
2019	Kramfors-Alliansen	15	(0)
2020–2021	Valbo FF	6	(3)
2021–	Helges IF	42	(52)

International career
2012–2018	Rwanda	10	(1)
- * Club domestic league appearances and goals

Barnabé Mubumbyi (born 24 July 1994) is a Rwandan football striker who currently plays for Helges IF.

He played in Rwanda, winning three league titles and one cup title with APR between 2014 and 2016. He made his international debut for Rwanda in November 2012, in a friendly against Namibia, and among others played the 2012 CECAFA Cup and the 2018 African Nations Championship.

In March 2018 he was brought by Hans Larsson on trial with Mjällby AIF in Sweden. In October the same year he was on trial in Sandvikens IF together with compatriot Yannick Mukunzi. Even though they both "impressed", a transfer did not happen for Mubumbyi, but he remained in Sweden, signing on for Kramfors-Alliansen in Division 2. Said a representative of the club; "he is an asylum boy, and then you never know how long he is allowed to stay".

In the summer of 2019 Valbo FF needed a replacement for Tshutshu Tshakasua and had Mubumbyi on trial. He played for Valbo in 2020, but became noted after joining Helges IF in 2021. The team was low-tier, playing in Division 4, where Mubumbyi scored 6 goals in his first match against BK Legend. He quickly became top goalscorer in the league. In 2022 he scored 6 goals against his former team Valbo.

== Career statistics ==
=== International ===
Appearances and goals by national team and year
National team	Year	Apps	Goals
Rwanda	2012	4	0
Rwanda	2013	–	
Rwanda	2014	–	
Rwanda	2015	–	
Rwanda	2016	–	
Rwanda	2017	4	1
Rwanda	2018	2	0
Total		10	1

Scores and results list Rwanda's goal tally first, score column indicates score after each Mubumbyi goal.

List of international goals scored by Barnabé Mubumbyi
No.	Date	Venue	Opponent	Score	Result	Competition
1	7 August 2017	Kigali Pelé Stadium, Kigali, Rwanda	Sudan	2–1	2–1	Friendly
