= Jakob Olsson (footballer) =

Swedish footballer

Personal information
- Full name: Jakob Olsson
- Date of birth: 14 August 1991 (age 35)
- Place of birth: Sweden
- Height: 1.84 m (6 ft 1/2 in)
- Positions: Winger; forward

Youth career
- Myckleby IK

Senior career*
Years	Team	Apps	(Gls)
2010–2012	Örgryte IS	33	(14)
2012–2013	GAIS	27	(5)
2013	→ Sandnes Ulf (loan)	6	(0)
2013–2019	Ljungskile SK	159	(23)
2017	→ Varbergs BoIS (loan)	14	(5)
- * Club domestic league appearances and goals as of 20:41, 13 September 2020 (UTC)

Jakob Olsson (born 14 August 1991) is a Swedish footballer who as a winger or forward.
