= Robin Östlind =

Swedish footballer

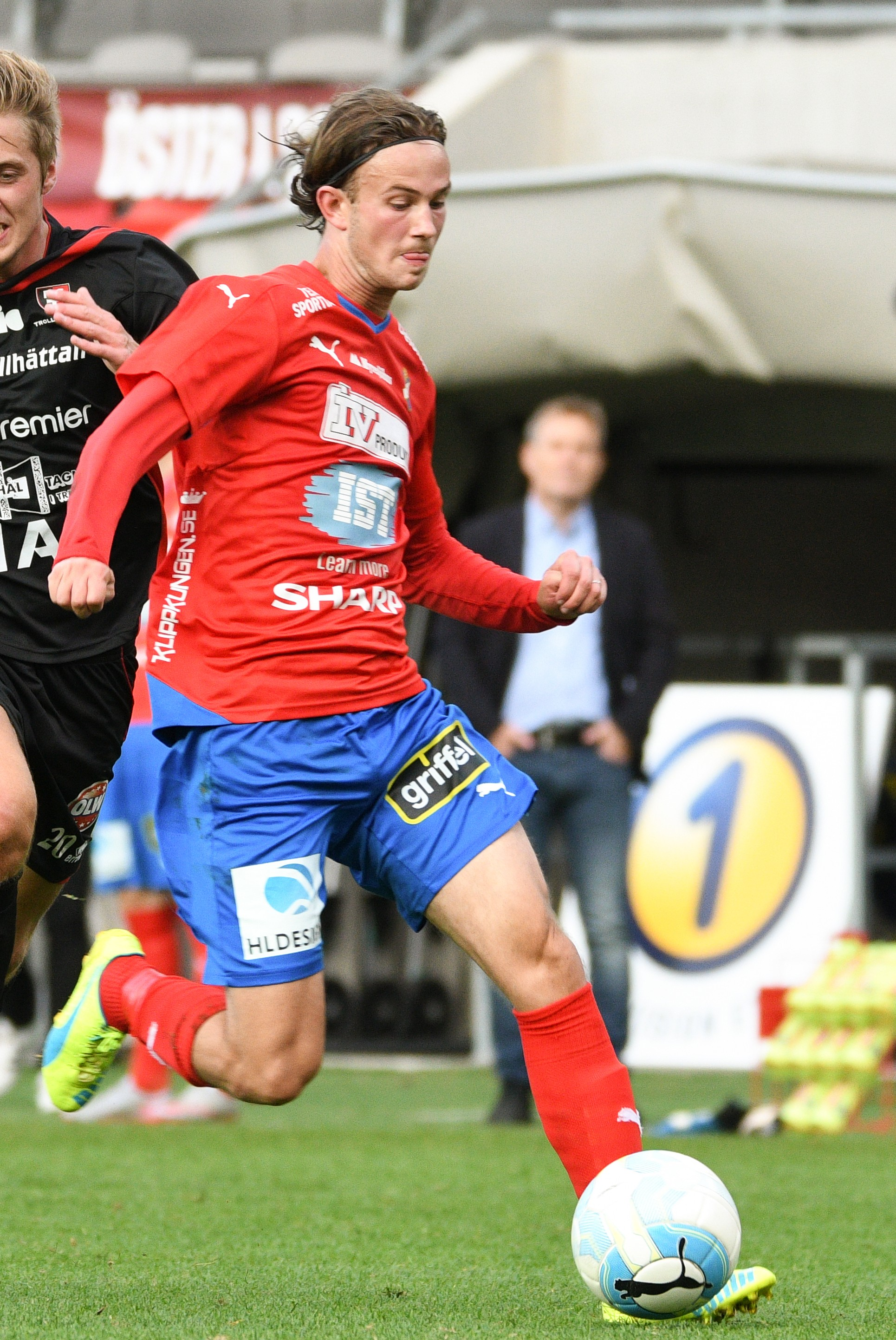

Personal information
- Full name: Robin Peter Östlind
- Date of birth: 14 March 1990 (age 36)
- Place of birth: Sweden
- Height: 1.76 m (5 ft 9 in)
- Positions: Forward; midfielder

Youth career
- Alingsås IF

Senior career*
Years	Team	Apps	(Gls)
2008–2011	Kalmar FF	15	(0)
2011	IFK Luleå	33	(8)
2012	→ IFK Mariehamn (loan)	12	(1)
2013–2014	IFK Mariehamn	30	(2)
2015	Oskarshamns AIK	26	(7)
2016–2017	Östers IF	55	(6)
2018–2019	Falkenbergs FF	47	(12)
2020	Halmstads BK	0	(0)

International career
2008	Sweden U19	4	(1)
- * Club domestic league appearances and goals as of 11 April 2021

Robin Östlind (born 14 March 1990) is a Swedish former footballer who played as a midfielder.
