= Salah Amin =

Egyptian footballer (born 1981)

Personal information
- Full name: Salah Mohamed Amin Ibrahim
- Date of birth: 18 September 1981 (age 45)
- Place of birth: Giza, Egypt
- Height: 1.76 m (5 ft 9 in)
- Position: Forward

Senior career*
| Years | Team | Apps | (Gls) |
| 2005–2006 | El Qanah | | |
| 2006–2007 | Ismaily | | |
| 2007–2008 | El Dakhleya | | |
| 2008–2014 | Tala'ea El Gaish | 85 | (27) |
| 2014–2015 | Smouha | 22 | (6) |
| 2015–2017 | El Entag El Harby | 62 | (13) |
| 2017–2018 | Tala'ea El Gaish | 32 | (9) |
| 2018–2019 | Nogoom | 29 | (13) |
| 2019–2020 | Misr Lel Makkasa | 19 | (4) |
| 2020–2021 | Wadi Degla | 31 | (4) |

International career
| 2009 | Egypt | 1 | (0) |
- * Club domestic league appearances and goals

Salah Mohamed Amin Ibrahim (Arabic: صلاح أمين; born 18 September 1981) is an Egyptian retired professional footballer who played as a forward.
