= Jacob Hjelte =

Swedish footballer

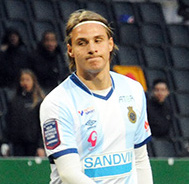

Personal information
- Full name: Jacob Karl Johan Hjelte
- Date of birth: 8 November 1996 (age 30)
- Place of birth: Sweden
- Height: 1.88 m (6 ft 2 in)
- Position: Forward

Team information
- Current team: Gefle IF
- Number: 9

Youth career
- –2011: Hagaströms SK
- 2012–2014: Gefle IF

Senior career*
Years	Team	Apps	(Gls)
2014–2018	Gefle IF	47	(2)
2018–2019	Sandvikens IF	31	(6)
2020–	Gefle IF	112	(37)

International career
2015	Sweden U19	1	(0)
- * Club domestic league appearances and goals as of 15 November 2024

Jacob Hjelte (born 8 November 1996) is a Swedish footballer who plays for Gefle IF as a forward.
