= Tobias Eriksson =

Swedish footballer

Personal information
- Full name: Robert Tobias Eriksson
- Date of birth: 19 March 1985 (age 41)
- Place of birth: Ljusdal, Sweden
- Height: 1.79 m (5 ft 10 in)
- Position: Midfielder

Youth career
- Ljusdals IF

Senior career*
Years	Team	Apps	(Gls)
2003–2008	GIF Sundsvall	111	(18)
2009–2018	Kalmar FF	214	(29)
2019–2020	GIF Sundsvall	18	(4)

International career
2002	Sweden U17	7	(0)
2003	Sweden U19	7	(2)
2010	Sweden	2	(0)
- * Club domestic league appearances and goals

Tobias Eriksson (born 19 March 1985) is a Swedish former professional footballer.
