= Raphael Boumsong =

Cameroonian footballer

Personal information
- Full name: Raphael Boumsong
- Date of birth: March 12, 1989 (age 37)
- Place of birth: Bazou, Douala, Cameroon
- Position: Forward

Team information
- Current team: Enyimba F.C.
- Number: 18

Senior career*
Years	Team	Apps	(Gls)
2012–2013	El-Kanemi Warriors F.C.	13	(9)
2014–	Enyimba F.C.	6	(1)
- * Club domestic league appearances and goals

Raphael Boumsong (born 12 March 1989) is a Cameroonian footballer who currently plays as a forward for Enyimba F.C. in the Nigeria Premier League.
