= Zakaria Abdullai =

Ghanaian footballer

Personal information
- Full name: Zakaria Abdullai
- Date of birth: 10 October 1989 (age 37)
- Place of birth: Ghana
- Height: 1.83 m (6 ft 0 in)
- Position: Midfielder

Youth career
- Tudu Mighty Jets

Senior career*
Years	Team	Apps	(Gls)
2008–2011	Tudu Mighty Jets		
2009–2010	→ Sekondi Wise Fighters (loan)		
2011–2014	Gefle IF	47	(0)
2014	Husqvarna FF	15	(0)
2016–2016	Husqvarna FF	44	(2)
- * Club domestic league appearances and goals as of 3 September 2016

Zakaria Abdullai (born 10 October 1989) is a Ghanaian footballer who plays as a midfielder.

Abdullai began his professional career with Tudu Mighty Jets and was for the season 2009–10 loaned out to Sekondi Wise Fighters. On 20 March 2011, he signed a three-and-a-half-year contract with Swedish side Gefle IF.
