= Torstorps IF =

Swedish football club

- Full name: Torstorps Idrottsförening
- Founded: 1935
- Ground: Najenlunden; Finspång; Sweden
- Chairman: Maria Björhn
- Head coach: Mujo Zelic
- League: Division 3 Södra Svealand
- 2010: Division 4 Östergötland Östra, 1st (Promoted)
Home colours

Torstorps IF is a Swedish football club located in Finspång in Östergötland County.

== Background ==
Torstorps Idrottsförening was formed on 21 August 1935 by Einar Svensson, Sven Lundholm and Fridolf Tapper. The sports club has provided for athletics, table tennis, bandy, and skiing as well as football. The club has around 500 members.

Since their foundation Torstorps IF has participated mainly in the middle and lower divisions of the Swedish football league system. The club plays in Division 4 Östra Götaland having relegated division 3, which is the best result in the club's history. A poor club season record relegated the team to division 4 östra götaland. They play their home matches at the Najenlunden in Finspång.

Manager of the club is Mujo Zelic, who was appointed in December 2011 after Jonny Asklöfs departed.

Torstorps IF are affiliated with Östergötlands Fotbollförbund.

== Recent history ==
In recent seasons Torstorps IF have competed in the following divisions:

2014 – Division IV, Östergötland Östra
2013 – Division IV, Östergötland Östra
2012 – Division III, Nordöstra Götaland
2011 – Division III, Nordöstra Götaland
2010 – Division IV, Östergötland Östra
2009 – Division IV, Östergötland Östra
2008 – Division IV, Östergötland Östra
2007 – Division IV, Östergötland Östra
2006 – Division V, Östergötland Mellersta
2005 – Division V, Östergötland Mellersta
2004 – Division V, Östergötland Mellersta
2003 – Division V, Östergötland Östra
2002 – Division V, Östergötland Östra
2001 – Division V, Östergötland Östra
2000 – Division V, Östergötland Östra
1999 – Division V, Östergötland Östra

== Attendances ==
Torstorps IF have had the following average attendances:

Season	Average attendance	Division / Section	Level
2009	Not available	Div 4 Östergötland Östra	Tier 6
2010	106	Div 4 Östergötland Östra	Tier 6
2011	116	Div 3 Södra Svealand	Tier 5
