= Justine Zulu =

Zambian footballer (born 1989)

Personal information
- Full name: Justine Zulu
- Date of birth: 11 August 1989 (age 37)
- Place of birth: Lusaka, Zambia
- Height: 1.82 m (5 ft 11 1/2 in)
- Position: Midfielder

Team information
- Current team: Red Arrows

Senior career*
Years	Team	Apps	(Gls)
2005–2007	National Assembly		
2007–2009	Hapoel Be'er Sheva	23	(1)
2009–2010	Hapoel Bnei Lod	31	(1)
2010–2012	Hapoel Rishon LeZion	50	(3)
2012	Enosis Neon Paralimni	11	(0)
2012–2013	Lamontville Golden Arrows	4	(0)
2013	Kabwe Warriors		
2014–2016	ZESCO United		
2016–2017	Young Africans		
2018–	Red Arrows		

International career^{‡}
2011–	Zambia	10	(0)
- * Club domestic league appearances and goals as of 12:55, 21 May 2018 (UTC) ‡ National team caps and goals as of 12:55, 21 May 2018 (UTC)

Justine Zulu (born 11 August 1989) is a Zambian international footballer who plays for Red Arrows, as a midfielder.

== Club career ==
Born in Lusaka, Zulu has played club football for National Assembly, Hapoel Be'er Sheva, Hapoel Bnei Lod, Hapoel Rishon LeZion, Enosis Neon Paralimni, Lamontville Golden Arrows, Kabwe Warriors, ZESCO United, Young Africans and Red Arrows.

In July 2012, he signed a three-year deal with the South African side Lamontville Golden Arrows. In October 2013, he returned to Zambian League for Kabwe Warriors, signing on a short-term deal. He joined ZESCO United ahead of the 2014 season.

== International career ==
He made his international debut for Zambia in 2011. Zulu was a member of the provisional squad at the 2012 Africa Cup of Nations, but did not make the final 23 players.
