= Ransta =

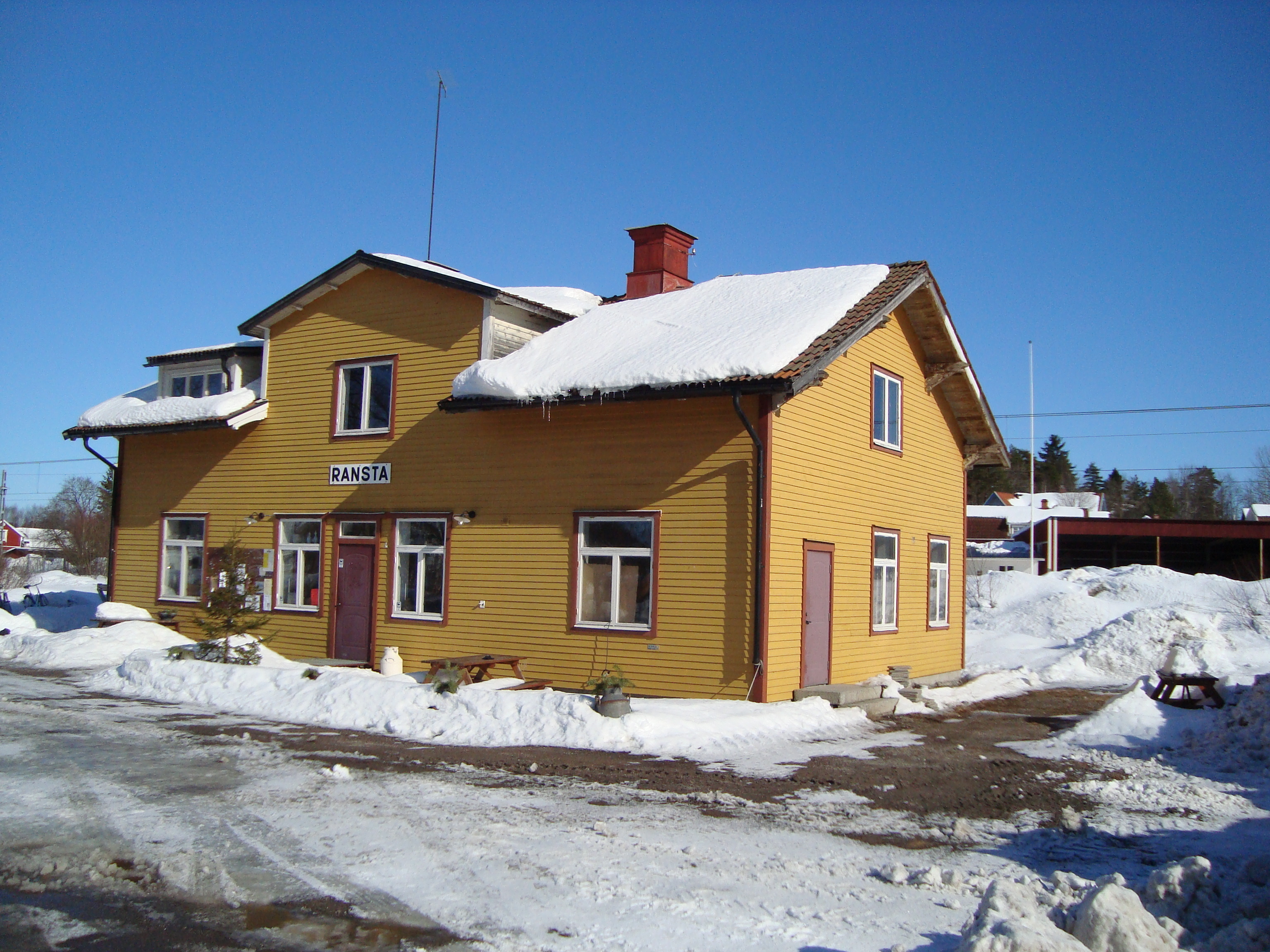

- Location within Västmanland Location within Sweden
- Coordinates: 59°49′N 16°38′E
- Country: Sweden
- Province: Västmanland
- County: Västmanland County
- Municipality: Sala Municipality

Area
  - Total: 1.07 km^{2} (0.41 sq mi)

Population (31 December 2010)
  - Total: 881
  - Density: 822/km^{2} (2,130/sq mi)
- Time zone: UTC+1 (CET)
  - Summer (DST): UTC+2 (CEST)

Ransta (Swedish pronunciation: [ˈrɑ̂ːnsta]) is a locality situated in Sala Municipality, Västmanland County, Sweden with 881 inhabitants in 2010.
