= Tenhults IF =

Swedish football club

- Full name: Tenhults Idrottsförening
- Founded: 1912
- Ground: Kabevallen; Tenhult; Sweden
- Capacity: 1,500
- Coach: Stefan Jörgensen
- League: Division 3 Nordöstra Götaland
- 2018: Division 3 Nordöstra Götaland, 7th
| Home colours | Away colours |

Tenhults IF, formed in 1912, is a Swedish football club located in Tenhult in Jönköping Municipality. In addition to football and floorball the club at one time also covered ice-hockey.

== Background ==
Since their foundation Tenhults IF has participated mainly in the middle divisions of the Swedish football league system. The club currently plays in Division 2 Västra Götaland which is the fourth tier of Swedish football. They play their home matches at the Kabevallen in Tenhult.

On 19 September 2006 Tenhults IF won the Smålandscupen (Småland Cup Competition) for the first time by defeating Nässjö FF 5–4 after extra time.

Tenhults IF are affiliated to the Smålands Fotbollförbund. Andreas Tegström formerly played for the club.

== Season to season ==
| Season | Level | Division | Section | Position | Movements |
|---|---|---|---|---|---|
| 1994 | Tier 5 | Division 4 | Småland Nordvästra | 5th | |
| 1995 | Tier 5 | Division 4 | Småland Nordvästra | 3rd | |
| 1996 | Tier 5 | Division 4 | Småland Nordvästra | 1st | Promoted |
| 1997 | Tier 4 | Division 3 | Nordöstra Götaland | 2nd | Promotion Playoffs |
| 1998 | Tier 4 | Division 3 | Sydvästra Götaland | 3rd | |
| 1999 | Tier 4 | Division 3 | Nordöstra Götaland | 3rd | |
| 2000 | Tier 4 | Division 3 | Nordöstra Götaland | 5th | |
| 2001 | Tier 4 | Division 3 | Nordöstra Götaland | 4th | |
| 2002 | Tier 4 | Division 3 | Nordöstra Götaland | 4th | |
| 2003 | Tier 4 | Division 3 | Mellersta Götaland | 5th | |
| 2004 | Tier 4 | Division 3 | Nordöstra Götaland | 2nd | Promotion Playoffs – Promoted |
| 2005 | Tier 3 | Division 2 | Mellersta Götaland | 9th | |
| 2006* | Tier 4 | Division 2 | Mellersta Götaland | 3rd | |
| 2007 | Tier 4 | Division 2 | Mellersta Götaland | 4th | |
| 2008 | Tier 4 | Division 2 | Östra Götaland | 8th | |
| 2009 | Tier 4 | Division 2 | Östra Götaland | 3rd | |
| 2010 | Tier 4 | Division 2 | Östra Götaland | 8th | |
| 2011 | Tier 4 | Division 2 | Västra Götaland | 8th | |
| 2012 | Tier 4 | Division 2 | Östra Götaland | 6th | |
| 2013 | Tier 4 | Division 2 | Västra Götaland | | |

* League restructuring in 2006 resulted in a new division being created at Tier 3 and subsequent divisions dropping a level.

== Players ==
=== First-team squad ===
As of 22 January 2017

Note: Flags indicate national team as defined under FIFA eligibility rules; some limited exceptions apply. Players may hold more than one non-FIFA nationality.

| No. | Pos. | Nation | Player |
|---|---|---|---|
| 1 | GK | (Sweden) SWE | Fredrik Claesson |
| 2 | MF | (Sweden) SWE | Adonish Kamara |
| 3 | DF | (Sweden) SWE | Oskar Rosenkvist |
| 6 | FW | (Sweden) SWE | Hamad Jaman |
| 7 | FW | (Sweden) SWE | Johan Fridén |
| 8 | FW | (Uganda) UGA | Alexis Bbakka |
| 9 | DF | (Sweden) SWE | Merdin Kojic |
| 12 | MF | (Sweden) SWE | Axel Göransson |
| 14 | DF | (Sweden) SWE | Viktor Hjertstedt |
| 16 | DF | (Sweden) SWE | Josip Maracic |

| No. | Pos. | Nation | Player |
|---|---|---|---|
| 17 | DF | (Sweden) SWE | Marcus Wirell |
| 18 | DF | (Sweden) SWE | Adam Hansson |
| 19 | MF | (Sweden) SWE | Matins Ebuka |
| 21 | GK | (Sweden) SWE | Oliver Dorji |
| 22 | MF | (Sweden) SWE | Zakariae Mahardy |
| 27 | FW | (Sweden) SWE | Philip Djup |
| 32 | MF | (Sweden) SWE | Abdallah El-Chanti |
| 77 | MF | (Sweden) SWE | Osman Karimi |
| — | MF | (Sweden) SWE | Mikael Axelsson |

== Management ==
=== Technical staff ===
As of 22 January 2017

| Name | Role |
|---|---|
| (Sweden) Pierre Henriksson | Sports Director |
| (Sweden) Thorbjorn Ahlgren | Manager |
| (Sweden) Stefan Jörgensen | Coach |
| (Sweden) Viktor Rönneklev | Assistant Coach |
| (Sweden) Frank Pettersson | Goalkeeper Coach |
| (Sweden) Ulf Glennhed | Equipment Manager |
| (Sweden) Henrik Petersson | Administrator |
