= Tshutshu Tshakasua =

Congolese-born Swedish footballer

Tshutshu Tshakasua wa Tshakasua
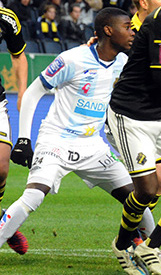

Personal information
- Full name: Tshutshu Tshakasua; Wa Tshakasua
- Date of birth: 15 May 1997 (age 29)
- Place of birth: Zaire
- Height: 1.80 m (5 ft 11 in)
- Position: Forward

Team information
- Current team: Sandvikens AIK

Youth career
- 2006–2010: Brynäs IF
- 2011–2014: Gefle IF

Senior career*
Years	Team	Apps	(Gls)
2014–2018	Gefle IF	20	(1)
2016	→ Sandvikens IF (loan)	10	(0)
2017	→ IFK Luleå (loan)	7	(0)
2018	→ Huddinge IF (loan)	11	(3)
2019	Valbo FF	9	(0)
2019	Södertälje FK	9	(5)
2020–2022	Gefle IF	52	(6)
2023–	Sandvikens AIK		

International career
2013–2014	Sweden U17	18	(5)
2014–2015	Sweden U19	4	(0)
- * Club domestic league appearances and goals as of 1 January 2023

Tshutshu Tshakasua (born 15 May 1997) is a Congolese-born Swedish footballer who plays for Sandvikens AIK as a forward.

As a youth player he trained with Celtic F.C. He first joined Gefle IF from their junior ranks ahead of the 2014 season, and ultimately left after the 2022 season.
