= Tenhult =

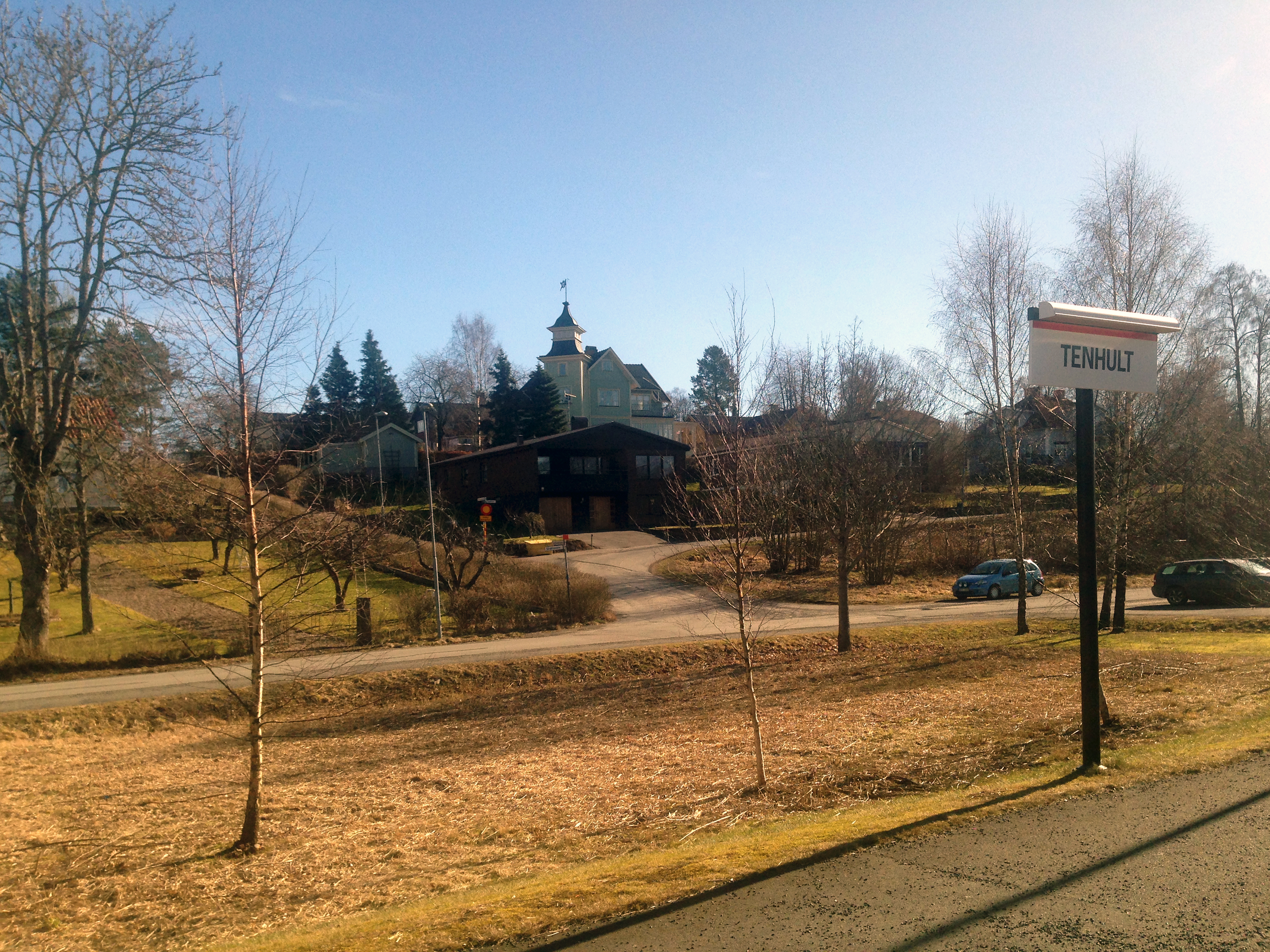
- Tenhult in March 2014

- Location within Jönköping Location within Sweden
- Coordinates: 57°43′N 14°19′E
- Country: Sweden
- Province: Småland
- County: Jönköping County
- Municipality: Jönköping Municipality

Area
  - Total: 2.52 km^{2} (0.97 sq mi)

Population (31 December 2010)
  - Total: 3,160
  - Density: 1,235/km^{2} (3,200/sq mi)
- Time zone: UTC+1 (CET)
  - Summer (DST): UTC+2 (CEST)
- Climate: Dfb

Tenhult (Swedish pronunciation: [ˈtêːnhɵlt]) is a locality situated in Jönköping Municipality, Jönköping County, Sweden with 2,977 inhabitants in 2010. By road it is located 15.7 kilometres (9.8 mi) southeast of the city centre of Jönköping. Lake Tenhultasjön lies to the southeast of the town.

== Sports ==
Tenhult has a soccer club, Tenhults IF who play in Division 2. Tenhults IF is managed by Mattias Fejes.

== Buildings ==
Tenhult has two groceries, a library, three churches and an elementary school (Tenhultsskolan).
