= List of Swedish football transfers winter 2011–12 =

This is a list of Swedish football transfers in the winter transfer window 2011–2012 by club.

Only transfers in and out between 1 January – 31 March 2012 of the Allsvenskan and Superettan are included.

== Allsvenskan ==
=== AIK ===
In: Note: Flags indicate national team as defined under FIFA eligibility rules; some limited exceptions apply. Players may hold more than one non-FIFA nationality.

No.	Pos.	Nation	Player
—	DF	SWE	Edward Owusu (from IF Brommapojkarna)
—	FW	SLE	Alhassan Kamara (from FC Kallon)
—	MF	TOG	Lalawélé Atakora (from Liberty Professionals)
—	DF	SWE	David Fällman (from FC Väsby United)
—	FW	SWE	Pontus Engblom (loan return from GIF Sundsvall)
—	FW	BRA	Antônio Flávio (loan return from São Caetano)
—	MF	SWE	Yussuf Saleh (loan return from Syrianska FC)
—	FW	CRC	Celso Borges (from Fredrikstad FK)
—	MF	SWE	Robin Palacios (from FC Väsby United)

Out: Note: Flags indicate national team as defined under FIFA eligibility rules; some limited exceptions apply. Players may hold more than one non-FIFA nationality.

No.	Pos.	Nation	Player
—	MF	ENG	Kenny Pavey (free transfer)
—	DF	SWE	Christoffer Eriksson (to Degerfors IF)
—	MF	SWE	Kevin Walker (to GIF Sundsvall)
—	MF	SWE	Jacob Ericsson (loan to Karlstad BK)
—	MF	SWE	Yussuf Saleh (free transfer)
—	FW	BRA	Antônio Flávio (to Nanchang Hengyuan)
—	FW	BIH	Admir Ćatović (contract terminated)
—	DF	SWE	David Fällman (free transfer)
—	MF	SWE	Robin Palacios (on loan to Akropolis IF)
—	FW	GHA	Kwame Karikari (on loan to Degerfors IF) (Note: "Degerfors lånar anfallare från Allsvenska AIK" (in Swedish). degerforsif.se. 2012-03-30.)

=== BK Häcken ===
In: Note: Flags indicate national team as defined under FIFA eligibility rules; some limited exceptions apply. Players may hold more than one non-FIFA nationality.

No.	Pos.	Nation	Player
—	FW	SWE	Andreas Drugge (from IFK Göteborg)
—	FW	HON	Eddie Hernández (loan from Platense) (Note: "Landslagskapten till Hisingen" (in Swedish). bkhacken.se. 2012-01-03.)
—	MF	SWE	Martin Ericsson (loan from IF Elfsborg)
—	FW	SWE	Joel Johansson (loan from IF Elfsborg)

Out: Note: Flags indicate national team as defined under FIFA eligibility rules; some limited exceptions apply. Players may hold more than one non-FIFA nationality.

No.	Pos.	Nation	Player
—	MF	SWE	Peter Nyström (to Halmstads BK)
—	DF	SWE	Jonathan Ask (to Lindome GIF)
—	DF	BRA	Deivisson (loan return to Cruzeiro)
—	GK	SWE	Sebastian Frick (free transfer) (Note: "Frick kastar sig vidare i karriären" (in Swedish). bkhacken.se. 2012-01-11.)
—	DF	SWE	Robin Jansson (to Bengtsfors IF)
—	FW	BRA	Maranhão (to Cruzeiro)

=== Djurgårdens IF ===
In: Note: Flags indicate national team as defined under FIFA eligibility rules; some limited exceptions apply. Players may hold more than one non-FIFA nationality.

No.	Pos.	Nation	Player
—	MF	SWE	Nahir Oyal (from Syrianska FC)
—	MF	GHA	Yussif Chibsah (from Gefle IF)
—	MF	SWE	Martin Broberg (from Degerfors IF)
—	MF	USA	Brian Span (from Virginia Cavaliers)
—	GK	DEN	Kasper Jensen (from FC Midtjylland)
—	FW	BRA	Ricardo Santos (from Kalmar FF)
—	FW	ENG	James Keene (on loan from IF Elfsborg)
—	DF	SWE	Andreas Dahlén (from FSV Frankfurt)
—	DF	DEN	Marc Pedersen (from Vejle Kolding)
—	GK	SWE	Christoffer Matwiejew (loan return from Sollentuna United FF)
—	FW	SWE	Carl Björk (loan return from Jönköpings Södra IF)

Out: Note: Flags indicate national team as defined under FIFA eligibility rules; some limited exceptions apply. Players may hold more than one non-FIFA nationality.

No.	Pos.	Nation	Player
—	GK	GAM	Pa Dembo Touray (free transfer)
—	FW	SWE	Mattias Jonson (retires)
—	MF	BFA	Adama Guira (free transfer)
—	GK	SLE	Mehdi Khalil (free transfer)
—	FW	DEN	Nicolaj Agger (loan return to Brøndby IF)
—	MF	NGA	Prince Ikpe Ekong (free transfer)
—	DF	SWE	André Calisir (free transfer)
—	DF	SWE	Rtawi Mecconen (free transfer)
—	MF	ZAM	Boyd Mwila (contract terminated)
—	MF	CRO	Hrvoje Milić (contract terminated)
—	MF	GHA	Imoro Adam (loan return to International Allies)
—	MF	GHA	Gabriel Ahmed (free transfer)
—	MF	SWE	Joakim Alriksson (to Ängelholms FF)
—	DF	SRB	Danilo Kuzmanović (to FK Rad)
—	FW	SWE	Johan Oremo (to Gefle IF) (Note: "Succéspelare återvänder till GIF" (in Swedish). gefleiffotboll.se. 2012-02-02.)
—	FW	SWE	Carl Björk (loan to IK Brage) (Note: "Forward från DIF klar" (in Swedish). ikbrage.se. 2012-02-14.)
—	DF	FIN	Jani Lyyski (to IFK Mariehamn)
—	DF	BEN	Yosif Ayuba (loan to FC Väsby United)
—	MF	SWE	Niklas Penttilä (to FC Väsby United)

=== GAIS ===
In: Note: Flags indicate national team as defined under FIFA eligibility rules; some limited exceptions apply. Players may hold more than one non-FIFA nationality.

No.	Pos.	Nation	Player
—	MF	SWE	Sandeep Mankoo (loan return from Qviding FIF)
—	DF	SWE	Johan Rundqvist (loan return from Qviding FIF)
—	MF	SWE	Johan Pettersson (loan return from Varbergs BoIS)
—	FW	SWE	Joakim Edström (loan return from Varbergs BoIS)
—	MF	SWE	Erik Berthagen (loan return from Varbergs BoIS)
—	FW	NGA	Peter Ijeh (from Syrianska FC)
—	MF	SWE	Jakob Olsson (from Örgryte IS)
—	MF	SWE	Jeffrey Aubynn (free transfer)
—	MF	SWE	Jesper Florén (from IF Elfsborg)
—	GK	SWE	Kalle Videhult (from Rynninge IK) (Note: "Målvakt från Rynninge back up i GAIS" (in Swedish). gais.se. 2012-03-30.)
—	MF	SWE	Mervan Çelik (free transfer) (Note: "Mervan åter i GAIS" (in Swedish). gais.se. 2012-03-31.)

Out: Note: Flags indicate national team as defined under FIFA eligibility rules; some limited exceptions apply. Players may hold more than one non-FIFA nationality.

No.	Pos.	Nation	Player
—	DF	SWE	Jonas Lundén (retires)
—	MF	SWE	Mervan Çelik (free transfer)
—	MF	SWE	Sandeep Mankoo (free transfer)
—	FW	NGA	Mohammed Abdulrahman (loan return to IF Elfsborg)
—	MF	ISL	Hallgrímur Jónasson (to SønderjyskE)
—	GK	SWE	Emir Jazvin (to Västra Frölunda IF) (Note: "Målvakt klar för A-laget" (in Swedish). proteamonline.se. 23 January 2012.)
—	DF	SWE	Johan Rundqvist (contract terminated)
—	MF	SWE	Johan Pettersson (loan to Örgryte IS)
—	MF	SWE	Jonas Lindberg (loan to Varbergs BoIS) (Note: "Berthagen och Lindberg lånas ut" (in Swedish). gais.se. 2012-03-22.)
—	DF	SWE	Erik Berthagen (loan to Utsiktens BK)
—	FW	ALB	Gzim Istrefi (loan to Ljungskile SK) (Note: "Gzim lånas ut till Ljungskile" (in Swedish). gais.se. 2012-04-02.)

=== Gefle IF ===
In: Note: Flags indicate national team as defined under FIFA eligibility rules; some limited exceptions apply. Players may hold more than one non-FIFA nationality.

No.	Pos.	Nation	Player
—	MF	SWE	Alexander Faltsetas (from IFK Göteborg) (Note: "Första nyförvärvet klart" (in Swedish). gefleiffotboll.se. 2011-11-19.)
—	FW	SWE	Marcus Hägg (loan return from Strömsbergs IF)
—	GK	SWE	Tobias Skärberg (loan return from Strömsbergs IF)
—	DF	SWE	Linus Malmborg (from Vasalund)
—	FW	SWE	Johan Svantesson (from Vara SK)
—	FW	SWE	Johan Oremo (from Djurgårdens IF)
—	DF	SWE	William Lundin (from IFK Göteborg)
—	DF	SWE	David Fällman (free transfer)

Out: Note: Flags indicate national team as defined under FIFA eligibility rules; some limited exceptions apply. Players may hold more than one non-FIFA nationality.

No.	Pos.	Nation	Player
—	MF	GHA	Yussif Chibsah (to Djurgårdens IF)
—	DF	SWE	Daniel Theorin (to Hammarby IF)
—	MF	MNE	Suad Gruda (free transfer)
—	MF	SWE	Daniel Leino (to Strömsbergs IF)
—	FW	BIH	Dragan Kapčević (to IK Brage)

=== GIF Sundsvall ===
In: Note: Flags indicate national team as defined under FIFA eligibility rules; some limited exceptions apply. Players may hold more than one non-FIFA nationality.

No.	Pos.	Nation	Player
—	FW	SWE	Johan Eklund (from Brage)
—	MF	SWE	Kevin Walker (from AIK)
—	GK	SWE	Oscar Berglund (from Helsingborgs IF)
—	MF	BRA	Michel (loan from Madureira Esporte Clube)
—	DF	SWE	Marcus Danielsson (from Västerås SK)
—	MF	SWE	Simon Helg (from Hammarby IF)

Out: Note: Flags indicate national team as defined under FIFA eligibility rules; some limited exceptions apply. Players may hold more than one non-FIFA nationality.

No.	Pos.	Nation	Player
—	MF	MEX	Alexis Mendiola (free transfer)
—	FW	SWE	Jonas Wallerstedt (free transfer)
—	FW	SWE	Pontus Engblom (loan return to AIK)
—	MF	SWE	Kevin Walker (loan return to AIK)
—	FW	GAM	Aziz Corr Nyang (to IF Brommapojkarna)
—	MF	SWE	Pontus Silfver (to Hudiksvalls FF)

=== Helsingborgs IF ===
In: Note: Flags indicate national team as defined under FIFA eligibility rules; some limited exceptions apply. Players may hold more than one non-FIFA nationality.

No.	Pos.	Nation	Player
—	GK	SWE	Oscar Berglund (loan return from Assyriska FF)
—	GK	SWE	Hampus Nilsson (loan return from IFK Värnamo)
—	FW	SWE	Mohamed Ramadan (loan return from Ängelholm)
—	MF	SWE	Abdul Khalili (loan return from IFK Värnamo) (Note: "Ny offensiv mittfältare till IFK Värnamo!" (in Swedish). ifkvarnamo.se. 2011-07-08.)
—	MF	SWE	Marcus Bergholtz (loan return from Stabæk)
—	MF	SWE	Daniel Nordmark (from IF Elfsborg)
—	DF	FIN	Jere Uronen (from TPS)
—	DF	SWE	Emil Krafth (from Öster)
—	MF	SWE	Loret Sadiku (from IFK Värnamo)
—	FW	ISL	Alfreð Finnbogason (loan from Lokeren)

Out: Note: Flags indicate national team as defined under FIFA eligibility rules; some limited exceptions apply. Players may hold more than one non-FIFA nationality.

No.	Pos.	Nation	Player
—	MF	NOR	Jørgen Skjelvik (loan return to Stabæk)
—	MF	SWE	Sebastian Carlsén (loan return to Internazionale)
—	MF	ISL	Guðjón Pétur Lýðsson (loan return to Valur)
—	MF	SWE	Simon Thern (to Malmö FF)
—	DF	SWE	Markus Holgersson (free transfer)
—	GK	SWE	Oscar Berglund (to GIF Sundsvall)
—	DF	FIN	Hannu Patronen (to Sogndal)
—	FW	SWE	Mohamed Ramadan (loan to Trelleborgs FF) (Note: "TFF lånar från HIF" (in Swedish). trelleborgsff.se. 2012-03-22.)
—	MF	SWE	Johan Eiswohld (to Ängelholms FF)
—	FW	SWE	Lucas Ohlander (loan to Östers IF) (Note: "Öster lånar spelare från HIF". ostersif.se. 2012-03-29.)

=== IF Elfsborg ===
In: Note: Flags indicate national team as defined under FIFA eligibility rules; some limited exceptions apply. Players may hold more than one non-FIFA nationality.

No.	Pos.	Nation	Player
—	FW	SWE	Joel Johansson (loan return from Halmstad)
—	MF	SWE	Viktor Claesson (from IFK Värnamo)
—	DF	SWE	Stefan Larsson (from Kalmar FF)
—	FW	ENG	James Keene (loan return from Fredrikstad)
—	FW	NGA	Mohammed Abdulrahman (loan return from GAIS)
—	DF	SWE	Anders Wikström (loan return from IFK Norrköping)
—	MF	SWE	Anton Wede (loan return from Falkenberg)
—	DF	SWE	Anton Lans (loan return from Falkenberg)
—	FW	SWE	Zlatan Krizanović (loan return from Falkenberg)
—	MF	NOR	Joackim Jørgensen (from Sarpsborg 08)
—	GK	DEN	Kevin Stuhr Ellegaard (free transfer)
—	GK	NOR	Kenneth Høie (from IK Start)
—	DF	ISL	Skúli Jón Friðgeirsson (from KR Reykjavík)

Out: Note: Flags indicate national team as defined under FIFA eligibility rules; some limited exceptions apply. Players may hold more than one non-FIFA nationality.

No.	Pos.	Nation	Player
—	GK	AUS	Ante Čović (free transfer)
—	DF	SWE	Johan Karlsson (retires) (Note: "Veteranen tvingas bort från Elfsborg" (in Swedish). expressen.se. 2011-07-31.)
—	MF	SWE	Daniel Nordmark (free transfer)
—	DF	SWE	Elmin Kurbegović (free transfer)
—	FW	ENG	James Keene (loan to Djurgårdens IF)
—	MF	SWE	Anton Wede (loan to Falkenberg)
—	DF	SWE	Anton Lans (loan to Falkenberg)
—	GK	DEN	Jesper Christiansen (to Odense Boldklub)
—	FW	SWE	Richard Yarsuvat (loan to IFK Värnamo) (Note: "Ännu en Elfsborgare klar inför säsongen – 'Känns som rätt val'" (in Swedish). ifkvarnamo.se. 2012-02-01.)
—	MF	SWE	Martin Ericsson (loan to BK Häcken)
—	DF	SWE	Anders Wikström (loan to Mjällby AIF)
—	FW	SWE	Joel Johansson (to BK Häcken)
—	MF	SWE	Jesper Florén (to GAIS)

=== IFK Göteborg ===
In: Note: Flags indicate national team as defined under FIFA eligibility rules; some limited exceptions apply. Players may hold more than one non-FIFA nationality.

No.	Pos.	Nation	Player
—	FW	BRA	Daniel Sobralense (from Kalmar FF)
—	GK	SWE	John Alvbåge (from Örebro SK)
—	MF	SWE	Alexander Faltsetas (loan return from IK Brage)
—	FW	SWE	Nicklas Bärkroth (loan return from IF Brommapojkarna)
—	MF	SWE	Thomas Olsson (loan return from Åtvidabergs FF)
—	DF	NOR	Kjetil Wæhler (from AaB)
—	MF	SWE	Nordin Gerzić (from Örebro SK)
—	MF	SWE	Pontus Farnerud (free transfer)

Out: Note: Flags indicate national team as defined under FIFA eligibility rules; some limited exceptions apply. Players may hold more than one non-FIFA nationality.

No.	Pos.	Nation	Player
—	MF	SWE	Thomas Olsson (retires)
—	MF	SWE	Kamal Mustafa (free transfer)
—	MF	SWE	Alexander Faltsetas (free transfer)
—	FW	SWE	Andreas Drugge (to BK Häcken)
—	DF	SWE	Karl Svensson (to Jönköpings Södra IF)
—	DF	SWE	Adam Johansson (to Seattle Sounders FC)
—	GK	SWE	Marcus Sandberg (loan to Ljungskile SK) (Note: "Olof Engelbrektsson blir ny assisterande tränare" (in Swedish). lsk.se. 2012-01-02.)
—	FW	SWE	Nicklas Bärkroth (loan to União Leiria)
—	MF	SWE	Elmar Bjarnason (to Randers FC)

=== IFK Norrköping ===
In: Note: Flags indicate national team as defined under FIFA eligibility rules; some limited exceptions apply. Players may hold more than one non-FIFA nationality.

No.	Pos.	Nation	Player
—	FW	GAM	Modou Barrow (from Mjölby Södra)
—	DF	NOR	Morten Skjønsberg (from Stabæk)
—	MF	SWE	Andreas Johansson (from VfL Bochum)
—	MF	LUX	Lars Gerson (from Kongsvinger)
—	GK	SWE	Andreas Lindberg (from Ranheim Fotball)

Out: Note: Flags indicate national team as defined under FIFA eligibility rules; some limited exceptions apply. Players may hold more than one non-FIFA nationality.

No.	Pos.	Nation	Player
—	MF	MDA	Petru Racu (free transfer)
—	DF	SWE	Anders Whass (retires)
—	FW	SWE	Andreas Haglund (free transfer)
—	FW	MWI	Russell Mwafulirwa (free transfer)
—	DF	SWE	Anders Wikström (loan return to Elfsborg)
—	GK	SWE	Niklas Westberg (to IF Brommapojkarna)
—	DF	SWE	Viktor Rönneklev (to Jönköpings Södra)
—	DF	BRA	Caio Mendes (to IK Brage)
—	FW	BRA	Bruno Santos (loan to Ljungskile SK) (Note: "Ljungskile lånar två spelare ifrån Norrköping" (in Swedish). lsk.se. 2012-03-01.)
—	MF	SWE	Riki Cakić (loan to Ljungskile SK)

=== Kalmar FF ===
In: Note: Flags indicate national team as defined under FIFA eligibility rules; some limited exceptions apply. Players may hold more than one non-FIFA nationality.

No.	Pos.	Nation	Player
—	FW	SEN	Pape Alioune Diouf (Dakar UC)
—	MF	ZIM	Archieford Gutu (Dynamos F.C.)
—	DF	NOR	Mats Solheim (from Sogndal)
—	FW	CRC	Jonathan McDonald (from Alajuelense)
—	MF	NOR	Jørgen Skjelvik (from Stabæk)
—	FW	SWE	Sebastian Andersson (from Ängelholms FF)
—	DF	SRB	Nenad Đorđević (from Krylia Sovetov)

Out: Note: Flags indicate national team as defined under FIFA eligibility rules; some limited exceptions apply. Players may hold more than one non-FIFA nationality.

No.	Pos.	Nation	Player
—	FW	BRA	Daniel Sobralense (to IFK Göteborg)
—	DF	SWE	Stefan Larsson (to IF Elfsborg)
—	FW	BRA	Marcel Sacramento (free transfer)
—	FW	BRA	Ricardo Santos (free transfer)
—	MF	NIR	Daryl Smylie (to Jönköpings Södra) (Note: "Daryl Smylie klar för J-Södra" (in Swedish). j-sodra.se. 2011-11-16.)
—	GK	SWE	Zlatan Azinović (free transfer)
—	MF	KOS	Alban Dragusha (free transfer)
—	DF	SWE	Mattias Johansson (to AZ)
—	MF	SWE	Hampus Bohman (loan to Umeå FC)

=== Malmö FF ===
In: Note: Flags indicate national team as defined under FIFA eligibility rules; some limited exceptions apply. Players may hold more than one non-FIFA nationality.

No.	Pos.	Nation	Player
—	GK	SWE	Dejan Garača (loan return from Limhamn Bunkeflo)
—	DF	SWE	Filip Stenström (loan return from Limhamn Bunkeflo)
—	GK	DEN	Robin Olsen (from IFK Klagshamn)
—	MF	SWE	Erik Friberg (from Seattle Sounders FC)
—	MF	SWE	Simon Thern (from Helsingborgs IF)
—	GK	SWE	Viktor Noring (loan from Trelleborgs FF)

Out: Note: Flags indicate national team as defined under FIFA eligibility rules; some limited exceptions apply. Players may hold more than one non-FIFA nationality.

No.	Pos.	Nation	Player
—	FW	SWE	Agon Mehmeti (to Palermo)
—	GK	SWE	Dejan Garača (free transfer)
—	GK	CZE	Dušan Melichárek (free transfer)
—	MF	SRB	Miljan Mutavdžić (free transfer)
—	DF	POR	Yago Fernández (free transfer)
—	MF	SWE	Jeffrey Aubynn (free transfer) (Note: "Jeff slutar i MFF" (in Swedish). mff.se. 2011-12-09.)
—	MF	SWE	Omid Nazari (free transfer)
—	DF	SWE	Tobias Malm (loan to Trelleborgs FF)

=== Mjällby AIF ===
In: Note: Flags indicate national team as defined under FIFA eligibility rules; some limited exceptions apply. Players may hold more than one non-FIFA nationality.

No.	Pos.	Nation	Player
—	MF	SRB	Haris Radetinac (from Åtvidaberg)
—	DF	TUR	Mahmut Özen (from Varbergs BoIS)
—	DF	SWE	Victor Agardius (from Kristianstads FF)
—	MF	ANG	Dominique Kivuvu (loan from CFR Cluj)
—	FW	SWE	Marcus Pode (from Trelleborgs FF)
—	DF	SWE	Anders Wikström (loan from IF Elfsborg)
—	FW	SWE	Pär Eriksson (loan from IFK Göteborg)
—	DF	NGA	Gbenga Arokoyo (free transfer)

Out: Note: Flags indicate national team as defined under FIFA eligibility rules; some limited exceptions apply. Players may hold more than one non-FIFA nationality.

No.	Pos.	Nation	Player
—	GK	SWE	Simon Svensson (free transfer)
—	MF	SWE	David Löfquist (to Parma)
—	DF	SWE	Jesper Westerberg (to Lillestrøm SK)
—	MF	SWE	Johan Svensson (loan to Kristianstads FF)
—	MF	SWE	Emanuel Svensson (loan to Kristianstads FF)

=== Syrianska FC ===
In: Note: Flags indicate national team as defined under FIFA eligibility rules; some limited exceptions apply. Players may hold more than one non-FIFA nationality.

No.	Pos.	Nation	Player
—	FW	SWE	Özgur Yasar (from Vasalunds IF)
—	DF	SWE	Gabriel Somi (from Örebro Syrianska IF) (Note: "Gabriel Somi till SFC" (in Swedish). syrianskafc.com. 2012-02-15.)
—	MF	SYR	Louay Chanko (from AaB Fodbold)
—	GK	SWE	Dejan Garača (free transfer) (Note: "Dejan Garaca förstärker i buren" (in Swedish). syrianskafc.com. 2012-02-17.)
—	FW	BIH	Admir Aganović (from Neuchâtel Xamax)
—	MF	ESP	Marcos Gondra Krug (from Club Portugalete)
—	DF	BIH	Haris Skenderović (from Stabæk) (Note: "120305 Presskonf. - Skenderovic och Martins ansluter" (in Swedish). syrianskafc.com. 2012-03-05.)
—	MF	SWE	Yussuf Saleh (free transfer)
—	FW	SWE	Lawal Ismail (from IFK Göteborg)
—	FW	SWE	George Mourad (from Mes Kerman)
—	MF	CMR	Matthew Mbuta (from Dinamo București)
—	GK	NOR	Lasse Staw (from Fredrikstad FK) (Note: "Syrianska FC värvar målvakten Lasse Staw" (in Swedish). syrianskafc.com. 2012-03-23.)

Out: Note: Flags indicate national team as defined under FIFA eligibility rules; some limited exceptions apply. Players may hold more than one non-FIFA nationality.

No.	Pos.	Nation	Player
—	MF	SWE	Nahir Oyal (to Djurgårdens IF)
—	FW	NGA	Peter Ijeh (to GAIS)
—	DF	SRB	Ivan Ristić (retires)
—	MF	PLE	Imad Zatara (to Sanat Naft Abadan)
—	DF	SWE	Erkan Saglik (free transfer)
—	DF	MNE	Vuk Martinovic (free transfer)
—	GK	SWE	Christian Frealdsson (free transfer)
—	GK	SWE	Aday Sleyman (free transfer)
—	MF	SEN	Mamadou Fofana (free transfer)
—	DF	SWE	Ahmet Özdemirok (free transfer)
—	DF	SWE	David Durmaz (to Assyriska) (Note: "Förstärkning på kanterna" (in Swedish). assyriska.se. 2012-01-12.)
—	MF	SWE	Abgar Barsom (free transfer)

=== Åtvidabergs FF ===
In: Note: Flags indicate national team as defined under FIFA eligibility rules; some limited exceptions apply. Players may hold more than one non-FIFA nationality.

No.	Pos.	Nation	Player
—	MF	SWE	Petrit Zhubi (from FC Trollhättan)
—	DF	SWE	Tom Pettersson (from FC Trollhättan)
—	FW	SWE	Mattias Mete (from Västerås SK)
—	MF	SWE	Tobias Nilsson (from Falkenberg)
—	MF	CMR	Alain Junior Ollé Ollé (from Stabæk Fotball)
—	DF	DEN	Allan Arenfeldt Olesen (from IFK Mariehamn)
—	MF	GHA	Emmanuel Dogbé (from Medeama SC)

Out: Note: Flags indicate national team as defined under FIFA eligibility rules; some limited exceptions apply. Players may hold more than one non-FIFA nationality.

No.	Pos.	Nation	Player
—	DF	NOR	Steinar Strømnes (free transfer)
—	DF	SWE	Eric Jangholm Melin (free transfer)
—	MF	NGA	Prince Eboagwu (free transfer)
—	MF	SWE	Pontus Karlsson (free transfer)
—	MF	SWE	Besart Kalludja (free transfer)
—	MF	SWE	Axel Konradsson (free transfer)
—	FW	SWE	Daniel Swärd (to Motala AIF)
—	MF	SRB	Haris Radetinac (to Mjällby AIF)
—	DF	SWE	Andreas Borg (to Motala AIF) (Note: "Borg klar för MAIF" (in Swedish). www6.idrottonline.se/MotalaAIFFK-Fotboll/. 2012-03-06.)

=== Örebro SK ===
In: Note: Flags indicate national team as defined under FIFA eligibility rules; some limited exceptions apply. Players may hold more than one non-FIFA nationality.

No.	Pos.	Nation	Player
—	GK	SWE	Jonas Sandqvist (from Aalesunds FK)
—	DF	SWE	Christoffer Wiktorsson (from Degerfors)
—	FW	SWE	Peter Samuelsson (from Degerfors)
—	GK	CAN	Tomer Chencinski (from VPS)
—	MF	MKD	Armend Alimi (free transfer)
—	MF	BRA	Daniel Bamberg (from FK Haugesund) (Note: "Daniel Bamberg klar för ÖSK Fotboll" (in Swedish). oskfotboll.se. 2012-01-31.)
—	MF	SWE	Tobias Grahn (from Mjällby AIF)
—	DF	KOS	Ilir Berisha (from FC Prishtina)
—	MF	SWE	Mohammed Saeid (from BK Forward)

Out: Note: Flags indicate national team as defined under FIFA eligibility rules; some limited exceptions apply. Players may hold more than one non-FIFA nationality.

No.	Pos.	Nation	Player
—	GK	SWE	John Alvbåge (to IFK Göteborg)
—	DF	FIN	Fredrik Nordback (retires)
—	GK	SWE	Peter Rosendal (free transfer)
—	FW	SWE	Simon Leonidsson (free transfer)
—	DF	COD	Boris Lumbana (free transfer)
—	MF	SWE	Erik Nilsson (to Degerfors)
—	DF	SWE	Per Johansson (to BK Forward)
—	MF	SWE	Johannes Skoglund (contract terminated)
—	MF	FIN	Riku Riski (loan return to Widzew Łódź)
—	FW	PAN	Brunet Hay (loan return to Sporting San Miguelito)
—	GK	SWE	Simon Nurme (free transfer)
—	MF	SWE	Nordin Gerzić (to IFK Göteborg)

== Superettan ==
=== Assyriska FF ===
In: Note: Flags indicate national team as defined under FIFA eligibility rules; some limited exceptions apply. Players may hold more than one non-FIFA nationality.

No.	Pos.	Nation	Player
—	DF	SWE	Sotirios Papagiannopoulos (from Akropolis)
—	DF	SWE	David Durmaz (from Syrianska FC)
—	GK	SWE	Robin Malmqvist (from Halmstads BK) (Note: "Målvakt klar för Assyriska!" (in Swedish). assyriska.se. 2012-01-19.)
—	MF	SWE	Hezha Agai (from Vasalunds IF)
—	FW	SWE	Bachir Katourgi (from Syrianska FC)
—	FW	BIH	Admir Ćatović (free transfer)
—	MF	GER	David Azin (from FC Pyunik)
—	FW	SWE	Fuad Hyseni (from Qviding FIF)

Out: Note: Flags indicate national team as defined under FIFA eligibility rules; some limited exceptions apply. Players may hold more than one non-FIFA nationality.

No.	Pos.	Nation	Player
—	MF	SYR	Imad Chhadeh (free transfer)
—	DF	SWE	Richard Jansson (free transfer)
—	MF	SWE	Narsai Shaba (free transfer)
—	FW	SWE	Mikael Ishak (to 1. FC Köln)
—	MF	SWE	Andi Toompuu (free transfer) (Note: "Ingen fortsättning för Andi Toompuu och Narsai Shaba" (in Swedish). assyriska.se. 2012-01-09.)
—	MF	SWE	David Yarar (free transfer)
—	FW	SWE	Erido Poli (free transfer)
—	FW	NGA	Emeh Izuchukwu (free transfer)
—	FW	SWE	Jones Kusi-Asare (contract terminated)
—	GK	SWE	Anton Olofsson (loan to Husqvarna FF)
—	DF	SWE	Simon Ogunnaike (to Väsby United)
—	MF	SWE	Kevin Sharro (to Enköpings SK)

=== Degerfors IF ===
In: Note: Flags indicate national team as defined under FIFA eligibility rules; some limited exceptions apply. Players may hold more than one non-FIFA nationality.

No.	Pos.	Nation	Player
—	DF	SWE	Christoffer Eriksson (from AIK)
—	MF	SWE	Erik Nilsson (from Örebro SK)
—	DF	SWE	Robert Medvegy (from Skiljebo SK)
—	MF	MDA	Gheorghe Andronic (from IFK Värnamo)
—	DF	SWE	Pontus Jakobsson (from Örebro SK Ungdom)
—	FW	NGA	Philip Aremu (from Old Edwardians F.C.) (Note: "Forwardförstärkning till Degerfors IF" (in Swedish). degerforsif.se. 2012-01-04.)
—	MF	SWE	Daniel Sundgren (from AIK) (Note: "Daniel Sundgren klar för DIF" (in Swedish). degerforsif.se. 2012-02-21.)
—	DF	GHA	Ghandi Kassenu (from Sheriff Tiraspol) (Note: "Ghandi Kassenu klar för Degerfors IF" (in Swedish). degerforsif.se. 2012-03-30.)
—	FW	GHA	Kwame Karikari (on loan from AIK) (Note: "Degerfors lånar anfallare från Allsvenska AIK" (in Swedish). degerforsif.se. 2012-03-30.)

Out: Note: Flags indicate national team as defined under FIFA eligibility rules; some limited exceptions apply. Players may hold more than one non-FIFA nationality.

No.	Pos.	Nation	Player
—	DF	SWE	Marcus Nilsson (free transfer) (Note: "Degerfors IF bantar spelartruppen inför nästa säsong" (in Swedish). degerforsif.se. 2011-10-25.)
—	MF	SWE	Johan Wennberg (free transfer)
—	DF	SWE	Fredrik Ahlman-Berger (free transfer)
—	MF	SWE	Erik Nilsson (free transfer)
—	DF	SWE	Marcus de Bruin (free transfer)
—	MF	SWE	Christophe Lallet (to Hammarby)
—	FW	SWE	Stellan Carlsson (free transfer) (Note: "Degerfors IF och Stellan Carlsson går skilda vägar" (in Swedish). degerforsif.se. 2011-11-10.)
—	DF	SWE	Christoffer Wiktorsson (to Örebro SK)
—	MF	SWE	Martin Broberg (to Djurgårdens IF)
—	FW	SWE	Peter Samuelsson (to Örebro SK)
—	MF	SWE	Andreas Ljunggren-Eriksson (to Ljungskile SK)
—	MF	SWE	Eric Jernberg (on loan to Karlstad BK) (Note: "Eric Jernberg lånas ut till Karlstad BK" (in Swedish). degerforsif.se. 2012-03-30.)

=== Falkenbergs FF ===
In: Note: Flags indicate national team as defined under FIFA eligibility rules; some limited exceptions apply. Players may hold more than one non-FIFA nationality.

No.	Pos.	Nation	Player
—	DF	SWE	Victor Sköld (from FC Trollhättan)
—	DF	SWE	Danny Ervik (from Örgryte) (Note: "Danny Ervik från Öis klar för FFF" (in Swedish). falkenbergsff.se. 2011-11-10.)
—	DF	SWE	Tobias Johansson (from Nybergsund) (Note: "Tobias Johansson klar för FFF" (in Swedish). falkenbergsff.se. 2011-11-18.)
—	MF	SLE	David Morsay (from Central Parade) (Note: "Sierra Leonier till FFF" (in Swedish). falkenbergsff.se. 2011-12-22.)
—	DF	SWE	Adam Eriksson (from Norrby) (Note: "Femte nyförvärvet klart" (in Swedish). falkenbergsff.se. 2011-12-23.)
—	MF	SWE	Anton Wede (loan from IF Elfsborg)
—	DF	SWE	Anton Lans (loan from IF Elfsborg)

Out: Note: Flags indicate national team as defined under FIFA eligibility rules; some limited exceptions apply. Players may hold more than one non-FIFA nationality.

No.	Pos.	Nation	Player
—	FW	SWE	Mikael Boman (to Halmstads BK)
—	DF	SWE	Kristoffer Englén (to Varbergs BoIS)
—	DF	SWE	Per Johansson (retires)
—	MF	SWE	Tobias Nilsson (to Åtvidaberg)
—	DF	SWE	Petter Digneus (free transfer)

=== Halmstads BK ===
In: Note: Flags indicate national team as defined under FIFA eligibility rules; some limited exceptions apply. Players may hold more than one non-FIFA nationality.

No.	Pos.	Nation	Player
—	FW	SWE	Mikael Boman (from Falkenbergs FF)
—	MF	SWE	Peter Nyström (from BK Häcken)
—	MF	PAR	Antonio Rojas (from Ängelholms FF)
—	MF	SWE	Johan Blomberg (from Ängelholms FF)
—	FW	ISL	Guðjón Baldvinsson (from KR Reykjavík)
—	MF	ISL	Kristinn Steindórsson (from Breiðablik UBK)
—	GK	SWE	Rasmus Rydén (from Östers IF)

Out: Note: Flags indicate national team as defined under FIFA eligibility rules; some limited exceptions apply. Players may hold more than one non-FIFA nationality.

No.	Pos.	Nation	Player
—	FW	SWE	Joel Johansson (loan return to Elfsborg)
—	FW	SWE	Joe Sise (free transfer)
—	MF	KOS	Kujtim Bala (to Varbergs BoIS)
—	MF	GER	Michael Görlitz (free transfer)
—	DF	LTU	Tomas Žvirgždauskas (free transfer)
—	DF	SWE	Markus Gustafson (free transfer)
—	DF	SWE	Mikael Rosén (free transfer)
—	GK	SWE	Björn Åkesson (to IFK Värnamo)
—	MF	SWE	Marcus Olsson (free transfer)
—	MF	KOS	Anel Raskaj (free transfer)
—	GK	SWE	Viktor Kristiansson (free transfer)
—	GK	SWE	Robin Malmqvist (to Assyriska FF)

=== Hammarby IF ===
In: Note: Flags indicate national team as defined under FIFA eligibility rules; some limited exceptions apply. Players may hold more than one non-FIFA nationality.

No.	Pos.	Nation	Player
—	DF	SWE	Daniel Theorin (from Gefle IF)
—	MF	SWE	Christophe Lallet (from Degerfors)
—	GK	SWE	Kevin Angleborn (from Hammarby TFF)
—	MF	USA	Baggio Husidić (from Chicago Fire) (Note: "Adis "Baggio" Husidic till Hammarby" (in Swedish). hammarbyfotboll.se. 2011-12-23.)
—	DF	SWE	Billy Berntsson (from Kilmarnock FC) (Note: "Billy Berntsson till Hammarby" (in Swedish). hammarbyfotboll.se. 2012-01-02.)
—	FW	USA	Billy Schuler (from North Carolina Tar Heels)
—	MF	SWE	Mikael Rynell (from Vejle Boldklub Kolding)
—	DF	SWE	Max von Schlebrügge (from Brøndby IF)

Out: Note: Flags indicate national team as defined under FIFA eligibility rules; some limited exceptions apply. Players may hold more than one non-FIFA nationality.

No.	Pos.	Nation	Player
—	MF	LBR	Isaac Pupo (free transfer)
—	DF	FIN	Robin Wikman (free transfer)
—	DF	SWE	Matthias Olsson (free transfer)
—	DF	SWE	Patrik Gerrbrand (free transfer)
—	MF	NOR	Petter Furuseth (retires)
—	FW	BRA	Paulinho Guará (free transfer)
—	DF	SWE	Mauro Saez Jarpa (free transfer)
—	DF	SWE	David Johansson (free transfer) (Note: "Ingen fortsättning för David i Hammarby" (in Swedish). hammarbyfotboll.se. 2012-01-02.)
—	DF	SWE	Isak Dahlin (free transfer)
—	MF	SWE	Maic Sema (to FK Haugesund)
—	DF	DEN	Cheikh Tidiane Sarr (free transfer)
—	FW	SWE	Christer Gustafsson (to IK Sirius)
—	GK	SWE	Rami Shaaban (retires) (Note: "Rami Shaaban får uppgifter vid sidan av planen" (in Swedish). hammarbyfotboll.se. 2012-01-17.)
—	FW	SWE	Björn Runström (free transfer)
—	MF	SWE	Simon Helg (to GIF Sundsvall)

=== IF Brommapojkarna ===
In: Note: Flags indicate national team as defined under FIFA eligibility rules; some limited exceptions apply. Players may hold more than one non-FIFA nationality.

No.	Pos.	Nation	Player
—	GK	SWE	Niklas Westberg (from IFK Norrköping)
—	MF	SWE	Filip Tronêt (from Västerås SK)
—	FW	GAM	Aziz Corr Nyang (from GIF Sundsvall)

Out: Note: Flags indicate national team as defined under FIFA eligibility rules; some limited exceptions apply. Players may hold more than one non-FIFA nationality.

No.	Pos.	Nation	Player
—	GK	SWE	Kristoffer Nordfeldt (free transfer)
—	MF	ALG	Dalil Benyahia (free transfer)
—	DF	SWE	Ferhat Korkmaz (free transfer)
—	FW	SWE	Saihou Jagne (free transfer)
—	FW	SWE	Niklas Bärkroth (loan return to IFK Göteborg)
—	DF	SWE	Elliot Lindberg (free transfer)
—	MF	SWE	Babis Stefanidis (free transfer)
—	DF	SWE	Karl Larson (to IK Sirius)

=== IFK Värnamo ===
In: Note: Flags indicate national team as defined under FIFA eligibility rules; some limited exceptions apply. Players may hold more than one non-FIFA nationality.

No.	Pos.	Nation	Player
—	DF	SWE	Johan Niklasson (from Jönköpings Södra) (Note: "Johan Niklasson klar för IFK Värnamo ' – Känns jättebra!'" (in Swedish). ifkvarnamo.se. 2011-12-06.)
—	GK	SWE	Björn Åkesson (from Halmstads BK)
—	DF	SWE	Andreas Hadenius (from IF Sylvia) (Note: "Ny mittback klar för IFK '- Känns förbannat kul!'" (in Swedish). ifkvarnamo.se. 2012-01-06.)
—	MF	SWE	Elmin Kurbegović (from IF Elfsborg) (Note: "Mittfältare klar för klubben" (in Swedish). ifkvarnamo.se. 2012-01-31.)
—	FW	SWE	Richard Yarsuvat (loan from IF Elfsborg)
—	MF	SWE	Carlos Gaete Moggia (from IK Sirius) (Note: "Ännu en mittfältare klar för klubben" (in Swedish). ifkvarnamo.se. 2012-02-10.)

Out: Note: Flags indicate national team as defined under FIFA eligibility rules; some limited exceptions apply. Players may hold more than one non-FIFA nationality.

No.	Pos.	Nation	Player
—	MF	SWE	Viktor Claesson (to IF Elfsborg)
—	MF	MDA	Gheorghe Andronic (to Degerfors)
—	MF	SWE	Loret Sadiku (to Helsingborgs IF)
—	DF	SWE	Mattias Svensson (free transfer)
—	DF	SWE	Johan Palm (free transfer)

=== IK Brage ===
In: Note: Flags indicate national team as defined under FIFA eligibility rules; some limited exceptions apply. Players may hold more than one non-FIFA nationality.

No.	Pos.	Nation	Player
—	FW	SWE	Peter Nilsson (from Qviding)
—	MF	NGA	Prince Eboagwu (free transfer)
—	MF	NOR	Mats Cato Moldskred (from Bryne FK)
—	MF	SWE	Andi Toompuu (from Assyriska FF)
—	FW	SWE	Carl Björk (loan from Djurgårdens IF)
—	MF	SWE	Patrik St Cyr (from Västerås SK)
—	FW	BIH	Dragan Kapčević (from Gefle IF)

Out: Note: Flags indicate national team as defined under FIFA eligibility rules; some limited exceptions apply. Players may hold more than one non-FIFA nationality.

No.	Pos.	Nation	Player
—	MF	SWE	Mattias Wiklöf (free transfer)
—	FW	SWE	Johan Eklund (to GIF Sundsvall)
—	MF	SWE	Tobias Johansson (free transfer)
—	GK	SWE	Pontus Hagström (free transfer)
—	MF	SWE	Andreas Hedlund (free transfer)
—	DF	SWE	Gustav Sundström (free transfer)
—	MF	ARG	Gustavo Ramirez (free transfer)
—	FW	ARG	Sebastian Zambrano (free transfer)
—	DF	SWE	Niklas Forslund (retires)
—	FW	SWE	Pontus Hindrikes (to Kvarnsvedens IK) (Note: "Hindrikes valde KIK" (in Swedish). dalademokraten.se. 2011-12-20.)
—	DF	SWE	Håkan Malmström (to FC Andrea Doria)
—	MF	SWE	Andreas Lindvall (free transfer)

=== Jönköpings Södra IF ===
In: Note: Flags indicate national team as defined under FIFA eligibility rules; some limited exceptions apply. Players may hold more than one non-FIFA nationality.

No.	Pos.	Nation	Player
—	MF	NIR	Daryl Smylie (from Kalmar FF)
—	GK	SWE	Frank Pettersson (from Dalkurd)
—	MF	SWE	Darko Glavas (loan return from Råslätts SK)
—	DF	SWE	Viktor Rönneklev (from IFK Norrköping)
—	DF	SWE	Karl Svensson (from IFK Göteborg)
—	MF	SWE	Jonathan Drott (from Myresjö IF)
—	FW	FRO	Finnur Justinussen (from Víkingur Gøta)
—	MF	SWE	Joakim Karlsson (from Kristianstads FF)

Out: Note: Flags indicate national team as defined under FIFA eligibility rules; some limited exceptions apply. Players may hold more than one non-FIFA nationality.

No.	Pos.	Nation	Player
—	MF	SWE	Tomas Backman (free transfer)
—	MF	SWE	Robert Walker (free transfer)
—	GK	ALB	Nuredin Bakiu (free transfer)
—	DF	SWE	Johan Niklasson (free transfer)
—	MF	SWE	Darko Glavas (free transfer)
—	GK	SWE	Rikard Hallin (free transfer)
—	FW	SWE	Philip Bernholtz (free transfer)

=== Landskrona BoIS ===
In: Note: Flags indicate national team as defined under FIFA eligibility rules; some limited exceptions apply. Players may hold more than one non-FIFA nationality.

No.	Pos.	Nation	Player
—	FW	SWE	Sonny Karlsson (from Utsiktens BK)
—	DF	SWE	Martin Rudolfsson (from Lunds BK)
—	FW	SWE	Luka Mijaljevic (free transfer) (Note: "Luka Mijaljevic skrev på tvåårskontrakt" (in Swedish). landskronabois.com. 2012-03-21.)
—	GK	SWE	Niklas Uddenäs (from FC Rosengård)

Out: Note: Flags indicate national team as defined under FIFA eligibility rules; some limited exceptions apply. Players may hold more than one non-FIFA nationality.

No.	Pos.	Nation	Player
—	FW	SWE	Ajsel Kujović (free transfer)
—	MF	SWE	Christoffer Tapper Holter (free transfer)
—	MF	SWE	Jesper Olsson (free transfer)
—	DF	SWE	Adam Svensson (free transfer)
—	FW	SWE	Nicklas Nielsen (retires)
—	DF	SWE	Mikael Bengtsson (retires)
—	FW	DEN	Mark Leth Pedersen (contract terminated)
—	MF	SWE	Simon Alm (free transfer)
—	FW	SWE	Markus Lindström (free transfer)
—	FW	SWE	Linus Olsson (retires) (Note: "Linus Olsson, trotjänare som lämnar" (in Swedish). landskronabois.com. 2012-03-16.)

=== Ljungskile SK ===
In: Note: Flags indicate national team as defined under FIFA eligibility rules; some limited exceptions apply. Players may hold more than one non-FIFA nationality.

No.	Pos.	Nation	Player
—	GK	SWE	Marcus Sandberg (on loan from IFK Göteborg) (Note: "Olof Engelbrektsson blir ny assisterande tränare" (in Swedish). lsk.se. 2012-01-02.)
—	DF	SWE	David Bennhage (from Ängelholms FF)
—	DF	USA	Patrick Hopkins (from Brisbane Wolves) (Note: "Patrick Hopkins klar för Ljungskile" (in Swedish). lsk.se. 2012-01-13.)
—	DF	SWE	Petter Björlund (from Utsiktens BK)
—	MF	SWE	Andreas Ljunggren-Eriksson (from Degerfors IF)
—	FW	USA	Steffen Vroom (from Brisbane Wolves)
—	DF	SWE	Niclas Andersén (from IFK Göteborg)
—	MF	SWE	Andreas Peterson (from IFK Göteborg)
—	FW	BRA	Bruno Santos (loan from IFK Norrköping)
—	MF	SWE	Riki Cakić (loan from IFK Norrköping)
—	FW	SWE	Gzim Istrefi (loan from GAIS) (Note: "Gzim lånas ut till Ljungskile" (in Swedish). gais.se. 2012-04-02.)
—	MF	ENG	Kenny Pavey (free transfer) (Note: "Kenny Pavey och Gzim Istrefi klara för Ljungskile" (in Swedish). lsk.se. 2012-04-01.)

Out: Note: Flags indicate national team as defined under FIFA eligibility rules; some limited exceptions apply. Players may hold more than one non-FIFA nationality.

No.	Pos.	Nation	Player
—	MF	SWE	Alexander Mellqvist (to Varbergs BoIS)
—	FW	SWE	Gabriel Altemark-Vanneryr (to Varbergs BoIS)
—	GK	USA	Nick Noble (free transfer)
—	MF	SWE	Drin Shasivari (free transfer)
—	MF	USA	Michael Thomas (to Sporting Kansas City)
—	FW	SWE	Johan Patriksson (to IK Oddevold) (Note: "Johan Patriksson har skrivit på för Oddevold" (in Swedish). oddevold.se. 2012-01-18.)
—	DF	SWE	Robin Jonsson (to Örgryte IS)
—	DF	SWE	Dragan Bogdanović (free transfer)
—	MF	SWE	Samir Fehric (free transfer)
—	MF	ESP	Lorenzo Brais (free transfer)
—	FW	NZL	Jarrod Smith (retires)
—	DF	SWE	Marcus Jarlegren (free transfer)

=== Trelleborgs FF ===
In: Note: Flags indicate national team as defined under FIFA eligibility rules; some limited exceptions apply. Players may hold more than one non-FIFA nationality.

No.	Pos.	Nation	Player
—	GK	SWE	Zlatan Azinović (free transfer)
—	DF	SWE	Tobias Malm (loan from Malmö FF)
—	FW	SWE	Mohamed Ramadan (loan from Helsingborgs IF)
—	MF	SWE	Sebastian Carlsén (loan from Inter Milan)

Out: Note: Flags indicate national team as defined under FIFA eligibility rules; some limited exceptions apply. Players may hold more than one non-FIFA nationality.

No.	Pos.	Nation	Player
—	FW	SWE	Joakim Sjöhage (to Varbergs BoIS)
—	MF	SWE	Andreas Wihlborg (to Östers IF)
—	DF	SWE	Erdin Demir (to SK Brann)
—	FW	SWE	Marcus Pode (to Mjällby AIF)
—	GK	SWE	Viktor Noring (loan to Malmö FF)
—	FW	SWE	Nichlas Schön (loan to Höörs IS)
—	MF	SWE	Daniel Jovanovic (to FC Trelleborg)
—	FW	SWE	Fisnik Shala (free transfer)

=== Umeå FC ===
In: Note: Flags indicate national team as defined under FIFA eligibility rules; some limited exceptions apply. Players may hold more than one non-FIFA nationality.

No.	Pos.	Nation	Player
—	DF	NOR	Karl Morten Eek (from FK Bodø/Glimt)
—	GK	SWE	Jonathan Johansson (from Skellefteå FF)
—	FW	SWE	Jonas Wallerstedt (free transfer) (Note: "Torbjörn Direkt – Jonas Wallerstedt klar för UFC" (in Swedish). ufc.se. 2012-02-24.)
—	MF	SLE	Ibrahim Kallay (loan from FC Kallon)
—	DF	SLE	Mohamed Kamanor (loan from FC Kallon)
—	FW	SLE	Albert Kargbo (loan from FC Kallon)
—	MF	SWE	Hampus Bohman (loan from Kalmar FF)

Out: Note: Flags indicate national team as defined under FIFA eligibility rules; some limited exceptions apply. Players may hold more than one non-FIFA nationality.

No.	Pos.	Nation	Player
—	MF	BIH	Rajko Komnenic (free transfer) (Note: "UFC värvar...snart" (in Swedish). vk.se. 2012-01-02.)
—	DF	SWE	Fredrik Isaksson (to Ersmarks IK)
—	MF	SWE	Robin Arestav (free transfer)
—	FW	FIN	Björn-Erik Sundqvist (contract terminated)
—	FW	SWE	Timothy McNeil (loan to Skellefteå FF)
—	DF	SWE	Joakimn Kvist (loan to Ånge IF)
—	MF	SWE	Jonathan Jonsson (loan to Tegs SK) (Note: "Jonathan Jonsson lånas ut till Tegs SK" (in Swedish). ufc.se. 2012-03-29.)

=== Varbergs BoIS ===
In: Note: Flags indicate national team as defined under FIFA eligibility rules; some limited exceptions apply. Players may hold more than one non-FIFA nationality.

No.	Pos.	Nation	Player
—	DF	SWE	Kristoffer Englén (from Falkenbergs FF)
—	FW	SWE	Joakim Sjöhage (from Trelleborgs FF)
—	MF	KOS	Kujtim Bala (from Halmstads BK)
—	MF	SWE	Alexander Mellqvist (from Ljungskile SK)
—	FW	SWE	Gabriel Altemark-Vanneryr (from Ljungskile SK)
—	MF	SWE	Muje Kastrati (from Tvååkers IF) (Note: "Muje Kastrati klar för BoIS". www2.idrottonline.se/VarbergsBoISFC-Fotboll (in Swedish). 2011-12-13.)
—	FW	SWE	Jakob Antonsson (from Varbergs GIF) (Note: "En av Varbergs mest lovande spelare satsar mot superettan". www2.idrottonline.se/VarbergsBoISFC-Fotboll (in Swedish). 2011-12-13.)
—	DF	SWE	Thommie Persson (free transfer) (Note: "Spelare med stor allsvenskrutin klar för Varbergs BoIS". www2.idrottonline.se/VarbergsBoISFC-Fotboll (in Swedish). 2012-01-04.)
—	DF	SWE	Ahmet Özdemirok (free transfer)
—	MF	SWE	Jonatan Berg (from A.S. Taranto Calcio)
—	MF	SWE	Jonas Lindberg (loan from GAIS)

Out: Note: Flags indicate national team as defined under FIFA eligibility rules; some limited exceptions apply. Players may hold more than one non-FIFA nationality.

No.	Pos.	Nation	Player
—	MF	SWE	Roger Karlsson (to Varbergs GIF)
—	DF	SWE	Erik Thuresson (free transfer)
—	DF	SWE	Peter Lennartsson (free transfer)
—	MF	SWE	Jonas Cullsjö (free transfer)
—	MF	SWE	Eldin Karišik (free transfer)
—	DF	TUR	Mahmut Özen (to Mjällby AIF)

=== Ängelholms FF ===
In: Note: Flags indicate national team as defined under FIFA eligibility rules; some limited exceptions apply. Players may hold more than one non-FIFA nationality.

No.	Pos.	Nation	Player
—	MF	POL	Zeyn S-Latef (from Syrianska Kerburan)
—	MF	IRN	Omid Nazari (from Malmö FF)
—	FW	SWE	Robin Staf (from Örebro SK) (Note: "Robin och Robin Klara!" (in Swedish). engelholmsff.com. 2012-01-24.)
—	FW	SWE	Robin Simovic (from IFK Klagshamn)
—	MF	SWE	Joakim Alriksson (from Djurgården)
—	GK	SWE	Hampus Nilsson (loan from Helsingborgs IF)
—	MF	SWE	Johan Eiswohld (from Helsingborgs IF)

Out: Note: Flags indicate national team as defined under FIFA eligibility rules; some limited exceptions apply. Players may hold more than one non-FIFA nationality.

No.	Pos.	Nation	Player
—	MF	PAR	Antonio Rojas (to Halmstads BK)
—	GK	SWE	Kristofer Nilsson (free transfer)
—	DF	SWE	Andreas Karlsson (free transfer)
—	FW	SWE	Kastriot Sogojeva (free transfer)
—	MF	SWE	Johan Blomberg (to Halmstads BK)
—	FW	SWE	Jörgen Nilsson (contract terminated)
—	FW	SWE	Sebastian Andersson (to Kalmar FF)
—	DF	SWE	David Bennhage (to Ljungskile SK)
—	DF	ESP	Gabriel Grillé Rocha (free transfer)

=== Östers IF ===
In: Note: Flags indicate national team as defined under FIFA eligibility rules; some limited exceptions apply. Players may hold more than one non-FIFA nationality.

No.	Pos.	Nation	Player
—	FW	SWE	Filip Thurn (from IFK Hässleholm)
—	MF	SWE	Andreas Wihlborg (from Trelleborgs FF)
—	FW	SWE	Andreas Birgersson (from Ljungby IF)
—	FW	SWE	Jonas Hellgren (from Västerås SK)
—	GK	SWE	Alexander Nadj (free transfer) (Note: "Intervju med Alexander Nadj" (in Swedish). oif.g.se. 2012-03-05.)
—	FW	SWE	Lucas Ohlander (loan from Helsingborgs IF)

Out: Note: Flags indicate national team as defined under FIFA eligibility rules; some limited exceptions apply. Players may hold more than one non-FIFA nationality.

No.	Pos.	Nation	Player
—	FW	SWE	Elias Todevski (retires)
—	MF	SWE	Freddy Borg (free transfer)
—	DF	SWE	Daniel Petersson (free transfer)
—	MF	SWE	Johan Frisk (free transfer)
—	MF	SWE	Oliver Nedanovski (free transfer)
—	GK	SWE	Rasmus Rydén (to Halmstads BK)
—	DF	SWE	Emil Krafth (to Helsingborg)
—	FW	SWE	Elias Todevski (loan to Hovshaga AIF)
