= List of Swedish football transfers winter 2012–13 =

This is a list of Swedish football transfers in the winter transfer window 2012–13 by club.

Only transfers in and out between 10 January – 2 April 2013 of the Allsvenskan and Superettan are included.

== Allsvenskan ==
=== AIK ===
In: Note: Flags indicate national team as defined under FIFA eligibility rules; some limited exceptions apply. Players may hold more than one non-FIFA nationality.

| No. | Pos. | Nation | Player |
|---|---|---|---|
| — | FW | NGR | Kennedy Igboananike (free transfer) |
| — | FW | SWE | Nabil Bahoui (from IF Brommapojkarna) |
| — | FW | SLE | Alhassan Kamara (loan return from Örebro SK) |

Out: Note: Flags indicate national team as defined under FIFA eligibility rules; some limited exceptions apply. Players may hold more than one non-FIFA nationality.

| No. | Pos. | Nation | Player |
|---|---|---|---|
| — | FW | SLE | Mohamed Bangura (loan return to Celtic) |
| — | FW | SLE | Tom Bongay (loan return to Old Edwardians) |
| — | MF | SWE | Gabriel Özkan (to IF Brommapojkarna) |
| — | FW | SLE | Alhassan Kamara (on loan to Örebro SK) |
| — | MF | SWE | Nicklas Maripuu (on loan to GIF Sundsvall) |

=== BK Häcken ===
In: Note: Flags indicate national team as defined under FIFA eligibility rules; some limited exceptions apply. Players may hold more than one non-FIFA nationality.

| No. | Pos. | Nation | Player |
|---|---|---|---|
| — | FW | MAR | Moestafa El Kabir (from Mjällby AIF) |
| — | MF | FIN | Mika Ojala (from Inter Turku) (Note: "Mika Ojala klar för BK Häcken" (in Swedish). bkhacken.se. 2012-11-09.) |
| — | DF | SWE | Fredrik Björck (from Tromsø IL) (Note: "Fredrik Björck klar för BK Häcken" (in Swedish). bkhacken.se. 2012-10-08.) |
| — | DF | GHA | Reuben Ayarna (from GAIS) (Note: "Ayarna till Häcken" (in Swedish). bkhacken.se. 2013-02-08.) |
| — | FW | BEN | Abdel Bouraima (from Right to Dream Academy) |
| — | FW | CIV | Drissa Diarrassouba (from Right to Dream Academy) |

Out: Note: Flags indicate national team as defined under FIFA eligibility rules; some limited exceptions apply. Players may hold more than one non-FIFA nationality.

| No. | Pos. | Nation | Player |
|---|---|---|---|
| — | FW | GHA | Waris Majeed (to Spartak Moscow) |
| — | MF | SWE | Jonas Henriksson (retires) |
| — | DF | SWE | Tom Söderberg (to IF Elfsborg) |
| — | DF | SWE | Hampus Andersson (to GAIS) (Note: "Hampus och Joel till GAIS" (in Swedish). bkhacken.se. 2012-12-20.) |
| — | MF | SWE | Josef Elvby (to Östers IF) (Note: "Josef Elvby klar för Östers IF" (in Swedish). ostersif.se. 2013-01-07.) |
| — | DF | LBR | Jimmy Dixon (to Boluspor) (Note: "Dixon lämnar" (in Swedish). bkhacken.se. 2013-01-09.) |
| — | FW | SWE | Andreas Drugge (to GAIS) (Note: "Drugge klar för GAIS" (in Swedish). bkhacken.se. 2013-02-20.) |

=== Djurgårdens IF ===
In: Note: Flags indicate national team as defined under FIFA eligibility rules; some limited exceptions apply. Players may hold more than one non-FIFA nationality.

| No. | Pos. | Nation | Player |
|---|---|---|---|
| — | FW | ARG | Luis Solignac (on loan from Atlético Platense) |
| — | MF | SWE | Andreas Johansson (free transfer) |
| — | DF | SWE | Jesper Arvidsson (from Åtvidabergs FF) |
| — | MF | BRA | Pablo Dyego (from Fluminense) |
| — | FW | SWE | Amadou Jawo (on loan from IF Elfsborg) |
| — | GK | SWE | Hampus Nilsson (from Ängelholms FF) |
| — | FW | GHA | Godsway Donyoh (on loan from Manchester City) |

Out: Note: Flags indicate national team as defined under FIFA eligibility rules; some limited exceptions apply. Players may hold more than one non-FIFA nationality.

| No. | Pos. | Nation | Player |
|---|---|---|---|
| — | MF | FIN | Daniel Sjölund (free transfer) |
| — | FW | ENG | James Keene (loan return to IF Elfsborg) |
| — | DF | SWE | Andreas Dahlén (free transfer) |
| — | FW | NGR | Kennedy Igboananike (free transfer) |
| — | DF | SLE | Mohamed Kamanor (loan return to FC Kallon) |
| — | DF | FIN | Joona Toivio (to Molde) |
| — | MF | SWE | Sebastian Rajalakso (on loan to Syrianska FC) |
| — | MF | SWE | Philip Hellquist (on loan to Assyriska) |
| — | MF | FIN | Kasper Hämäläinen (to Lech Poznań) |
| — | MF | DEN | Kasper Jensen (free transfer) |
| — | GK | SWE | Tommi Vaiho (to GAIS) (Note: "Tommi Vaiho lämnar Djurgården för GAIS" (in Swedish). dif.se. 2013-01-23.) |

=== Gefle IF ===
In: Note: Flags indicate national team as defined under FIFA eligibility rules; some limited exceptions apply. Players may hold more than one non-FIFA nationality.

| No. | Pos. | Nation | Player |
|---|---|---|---|
| — | DF | SWE | Anders Wikström (from Mjällby AIF) |
| — | DF | SWE | Jonas Olsson (from Degerfors IF) |
| — | DF | RSA | Sive Pekezela (from Germinal Beerschot) |

Out: Note: Flags indicate national team as defined under FIFA eligibility rules; some limited exceptions apply. Players may hold more than one non-FIFA nationality.

| No. | Pos. | Nation | Player |
|---|---|---|---|
| — | DF | SWE | Eric Larsson (to GIF Sundsvall) |
| — | DF | SWE | Linus Malmborg (on loan to Assyriska) (Note: "Malmborg till Assyriska" (in Swedish). gifsundsvall.se. 2013-01-30.) |

=== Halmstads BK ===
In: Note: Flags indicate national team as defined under FIFA eligibility rules; some limited exceptions apply. Players may hold more than one non-FIFA nationality.

| No. | Pos. | Nation | Player |
|---|---|---|---|
| — | GK | SWE | Stojan Lukić (from Falkenbergs FF) |
| — | DF | SWE | Fredrik Liverstam (from Landskrona BoIS) |
| — | MF | SWE | Kristoffer Fagercrantz (from Kalmar FF) |
| — | MF | SWE | Stefan Selaković (free transfer) |
| — | MF | SWE | Andreas Landgren (on loan from Fredrikstad FK) |

Out: Note: Flags indicate national team as defined under FIFA eligibility rules; some limited exceptions apply. Players may hold more than one non-FIFA nationality.

| No. | Pos. | Nation | Player |
|---|---|---|---|
| — | GK | SWE | Karl-Johan Johnsson (to N.E.C.) |
| — | MF | SWE | Kristoffer Fagercrantz (loan return to Kalmar FF) |
| — | DF | SWE | Johnny Lundberg (to Sandnes Ulf) |
| — | DF | USA | Ryan Miller (to Portland Timbers) |
| — | DF | SWE | Simon Klang (to IS Halmia) |

=== Helsingborgs IF ===
In: Note: Flags indicate national team as defined under FIFA eligibility rules; some limited exceptions apply. Players may hold more than one non-FIFA nationality.

| No. | Pos. | Nation | Player |
|---|---|---|---|
| — | FW | SWE | Lucas Ohlander (loan return from Brønshøj BK) (Note: "Lucas Ohlander lånas ut till danska ligan" (in Swedish). hif.se. 2012-09-04.) |
| — | FW | SWE | Robin Simovic (from Ängelholms FF) |

Out: Note: Flags indicate national team as defined under FIFA eligibility rules; some limited exceptions apply. Players may hold more than one non-FIFA nationality.

| No. | Pos. | Nation | Player |
|---|---|---|---|
| — | FW | SRB | Nikola Đurđić (loan return to FK Haugesund) |
| — | FW | SWE | Lucas Ohlander (on loan to Brønshøj BK) |
| — | FW | NOR | Thomas Sørum (to Strømsgodset IF) |

=== IF Brommapojkarna ===
In: Note: Flags indicate national team as defined under FIFA eligibility rules; some limited exceptions apply. Players may hold more than one non-FIFA nationality.

| No. | Pos. | Nation | Player |
|---|---|---|---|
| — | MF | SWE | Gabriel Özkan (from AIK) |
| — | FW | SWE | Nicklas Bärkroth (from IFK Göteborg) |
| — | MF | SWE | Panajotis Dimitriadis (from Sandefjord) |
| — | DF | SWE | Fredric Jonson (from GIF Sundsvall) |
| — | FW | SWE | Andreas Haddad (from Örebro SK) |

Out: Note: Flags indicate national team as defined under FIFA eligibility rules; some limited exceptions apply. Players may hold more than one non-FIFA nationality.

| No. | Pos. | Nation | Player |
|---|---|---|---|
| — | FW | SWE | Nabil Bahoui (to AIK) |
| — | DF | SWE | Ludwig Augustinsson (to IFK Göteborg) |
| — | FW | SWE | Pablo Piñones Arce (free transfer) |
| — | DF | SWE | Nicklas Carlsson (free transfer) |

=== IF Elfsborg ===
In: Note: Flags indicate national team as defined under FIFA eligibility rules; some limited exceptions apply. Players may hold more than one non-FIFA nationality.

| No. | Pos. | Nation | Player |
|---|---|---|---|
| — | DF | SWE | Tom Söderberg (from BK Häcken) |
| — | FW | ENG | James Keene (loan return from Djurgårdens IF) |
| — | FW | SLE | Mohamed Bangura (on loan from Celtic F.C.) (Note: "Bangura presenterad på presskonferens" (in Swedish). elfsborg.se. 2013-01-24.) |
| — | GK | LBN | Abbas Hassan (from IFK Norrköping) (Note: "Abbas Hassan klar för IF Elfsborg" (in Swedish). elfsborg.se. 2013-02-14.) |
| — | MF | NOR | Henning Hauger (from Hannover 96) (Note: "Norsk A-landslagsman till IF Elfsborg" (in Swedish). elfsborg.se. 2013-01-04.) |

Out: Note: Flags indicate national team as defined under FIFA eligibility rules; some limited exceptions apply. Players may hold more than one non-FIFA nationality.

| No. | Pos. | Nation | Player |
|---|---|---|---|
| — | DF | SWE | Andreas Augustsson (free transfer) |
| — | MF | SWE | Oscar Hiljemark (to PSV Eindhoven) |
| — | FW | SWE | Amadou Jawo (on loan from IF Elfsborg) |

=== IFK Göteborg ===
In: Note: Flags indicate national team as defined under FIFA eligibility rules; some limited exceptions apply. Players may hold more than one non-FIFA nationality.

| No. | Pos. | Nation | Player |
|---|---|---|---|
| — | GK | SWE | Marcus Sandberg (loan return from Ljungskile SK) |
| — | DF | SWE | Ludwig Augustinsson (from IF Brommapojkarna) |
| — | DF | SWE | Adam Johansson (from Seattle Sounders FC) |

Out: Note: Flags indicate national team as defined under FIFA eligibility rules; some limited exceptions apply. Players may hold more than one non-FIFA nationality.

| No. | Pos. | Nation | Player |
|---|---|---|---|
| — | MF | SWE | Stefan Selaković (free transfer) |
| — | GK | SWE | Erik Dahlin (to Sogndal) |
| — | GK | SWE | August Strömberg (to Degerfors IF) |
| — | FW | SWE | Sebastian Ohlsson (loan to Örgryte IS) |
| — | FW | SWE | Nicklas Bärkroth (to IF Brommapojkarna) |
| — | DF | SWE | Jonathan Azulay (loan to Örgryte IS) |
| — | DF | SWE | Erik Lund (loan to Örebro SK) |

=== IFK Norrköping ===
In: Note: Flags indicate national team as defined under FIFA eligibility rules; some limited exceptions apply. Players may hold more than one non-FIFA nationality.

| No. | Pos. | Nation | Player |
|---|---|---|---|
| — | MF | SWE | Riki Cakić (loan return from IK Sleipner) |
| — | MF | SWE | Rawez Lawan (from FC Nordsjælland) |
| — | MF | EST | Siim Luts (from FC Flora Tallinn) |
| — | FW | BRA | Bruno Santos (loan return from Ljungskile SK) (Note: "Ljungskile lånar två spelare ifrån Norrköping" (in Swedish). lsk.se. 2012-03-01.) |

Out: Note: Flags indicate national team as defined under FIFA eligibility rules; some limited exceptions apply. Players may hold more than one non-FIFA nationality.

| No. | Pos. | Nation | Player |
|---|---|---|---|
| 22 | MF | SWE | Armin Tanković (on loan to Varbergs BoIS FC) |
| — | GK | LBN | Abbas Hassan (from IFK Norrköping) |
| — | FW | BRA | Bruno Santos (free transfer) |

=== Kalmar FF ===
In: Note: Flags indicate national team as defined under FIFA eligibility rules; some limited exceptions apply. Players may hold more than one non-FIFA nationality.

| No. | Pos. | Nation | Player |
|---|---|---|---|
| — | MF | BRA | Ismael Silva Lima (from Crateús Esporte) |
| — | MF | SWE | Kristoffer Fagercrantz (loan return from Halmstads BK) |
| — | GK | SWE | Zlatan Azinović (from Malmö FF) |
| — | GK | NOR | Lars Cramer (from Strømsgodset IF) (Note: "Målvakt klar för Kalmar FF" (in Swedish). kalmarff.se. 2013-03-28.) |
| — | MF | BRA | Romarinho (from GAIS) |
| — | MF | SWE | Jonathan Ring (from IFK Värnamo) |

Out: Note: Flags indicate national team as defined under FIFA eligibility rules; some limited exceptions apply. Players may hold more than one non-FIFA nationality.

| No. | Pos. | Nation | Player |
|---|---|---|---|
| — | MF | SWE | Johan Bertilsson (on loan to Degerfors IF) |
| — | DF | KOS | Liridon Leçi (to Landskrona BoIS) |
| — | GK | SEN | Khadim N'Diaye (loan return to ASC Linguère) |
| — | MF | SWE | Kristoffer Fagercrantz (to Halmstads BK) |
| — | FW | NGR | Abiola Dauda (to Red Star Belgrade) |

=== Malmö FF ===
In: Note: Flags indicate national team as defined under FIFA eligibility rules; some limited exceptions apply. Players may hold more than one non-FIFA nationality.

| No. | Pos. | Nation | Player |
|---|---|---|---|
| — | DF | SWE | Tobias Malm (loan return from Trelleborgs FF) |
| — | FW | SWE | Petter Thelin (from Kramfors-Alliansen) |
| — | MF | SWE | Emil Forsberg (from GIF Sundsvall) |
| — | DF | SWE | Erik Johansson (from GAIS) (Note: "Erik Johansson klar" (in Swedish). mff.se. 2012-12-12.) |
| — | FW | GHA | Benjamin Fadi (from Heart of Lions) |
| — | FW | SWE | Magnus Eriksson (from Gent) |

Out: Note: Flags indicate national team as defined under FIFA eligibility rules; some limited exceptions apply. Players may hold more than one non-FIFA nationality.

| No. | Pos. | Nation | Player |
|---|---|---|---|
| — | MF | SWE | David Löfquist (loan return to Parma) |
| — | DF | DEN | Ulrich Vinzents (to Ringsted IF) |
| — | MF | BRA | Wílton Figueiredo (to Gaziantepspor) |
| — | FW | SWE | Daniel Larsson (to Real Valladolid) |
| — | GK | SWE | Zlatan Azinović (to Kalmar FF) |
| — | DF | SWE | Daniel Andersson (retires) |
| — | FW | SWE | Alexander Nilsson (on loan to Landskrona BoIS) |
| — | DF | SWE | Tobias Malm (on loan to Landskrona BoIS) |
| — | DF | SWE | Jasmin Sudić (on loan to Mjällby AIF) |
| — | DF | SWE | Filip Stenström (on loan to Ängelholms FF) |
| — | MF | SWE | Amin Nazari (on loan to Assyriska FF) |
| — | FW | SWE | Petter Thelin (on loan to IF Limhamn Bunkeflo) |

=== Mjällby AIF ===
In: Note: Flags indicate national team as defined under FIFA eligibility rules; some limited exceptions apply. Players may hold more than one non-FIFA nationality.

| No. | Pos. | Nation | Player |
|---|---|---|---|
| — | DF | SWE | Jasmin Sudić (on loan from Malmö FF) |
| — | FW | SWE | Kristian Haynes (from Trelleborgs FF) |

Out: Note: Flags indicate national team as defined under FIFA eligibility rules; some limited exceptions apply. Players may hold more than one non-FIFA nationality.

| No. | Pos. | Nation | Player |
|---|---|---|---|
| — | DF | CHI | Juan Robledo (to Östers IF) (Note: "Juan Robledo klar för Östers IF" (in Swedish). ostersif.se.) |
| — | FW | MAR | Moestafa El Kabir (to BK Häcken) |

=== Syrianska FC ===
In: Note: Flags indicate national team as defined under FIFA eligibility rules; some limited exceptions apply. Players may hold more than one non-FIFA nationality.

| No. | Pos. | Nation | Player |
|---|---|---|---|
| — | MF | SWE | Semir Mete (loan return from Husqvarna FF) |
| — | MF | SWE | Sebastian Rajalakso (on loan to Djurgårdens IF) |
| — | MF | DEN | Sebastian Svärd (free transfer) |

Out: Note: Flags indicate national team as defined under FIFA eligibility rules; some limited exceptions apply. Players may hold more than one non-FIFA nationality.

| No. | Pos. | Nation | Player |
|---|---|---|---|
| — | MF | SWE | Josef Ibrahim (loan return to Örebro SK) |
| — | MF | GAM | Omar Jawo (free transfer) |
| — | MF | SWE | Yussuf Saleh (free transfer) |
| — | MF | SWE | Johan Arneng (free transfer) |

=== Åtvidabergs FF ===
In: Note: Flags indicate national team as defined under FIFA eligibility rules; some limited exceptions apply. Players may hold more than one non-FIFA nationality.

| No. | Pos. | Nation | Player |
|---|---|---|---|
| — | MF | SWE | Christoffer Karlsson (loan return from Varbergs BoIS) |
| — | FW | NGR | John Owoeri (from Warri Wolves F.C.) |
| — | DF | FIN | Hampus Holmgren (from Vasa IFK) |
| — | MF | FIN | Daniel Sjölund (from Djurgårdens IF) |
| — | DF | SWE | Andreas Dahlén (free transfer) |
| — | FW | SWE | Joel Rajalakso (from Enköpings SK) |

Out: Note: Flags indicate national team as defined under FIFA eligibility rules; some limited exceptions apply. Players may hold more than one non-FIFA nationality.

| No. | Pos. | Nation | Player |
|---|---|---|---|
| — | MF | SWE | Amir Suljic (to Ljungskile SK) |
| — | MF | SWE | Tobias Nilsson (to Örebro SK) |
| — | DF | SWE | Andreas Johansson (free transfer) |
| — | DF | SWE | Jesper Arvidsson (from Djurgårdens IF) |

=== Östers IF ===
In: Note: Flags indicate national team as defined under FIFA eligibility rules; some limited exceptions apply. Players may hold more than one non-FIFA nationality.

| No. | Pos. | Nation | Player |
|---|---|---|---|
| 9 | MF | ENG | Kenny Pavey (from Ljungskile SK) (Note: "Kenny Pavey till Östers IF" (in Swedish). ostersif.se.) |
| — | MF | SWE | Vladica Zlojutro (from IFK Värnamo) |
| — | MF | SWE | Josef Elvby (from BK Häcken) |
| — | DF | CHI | Juan Robledo (from Mjällby AIF) |
| — | GK | SWE | Robertino Kljajic (from Höganäs BK) |
| — | FW | SWE | Pablo Piñones-Arce (from IF Brommapojkarna) |

Out: Note: Flags indicate national team as defined under FIFA eligibility rules; some limited exceptions apply. Players may hold more than one non-FIFA nationality.

| No. | Pos. | Nation | Player |
|---|---|---|---|
| 26 | FW | SWE | Anton Henningsson (to Kristianstads FF) |
| 29 | GK | SWE | Darmin Sobo (to Oskarshamns AIK) |
| 29 | MF | SWE | Jonas Hellgren (to Assyriska FF) |

== Superettan ==
=== Assyriska FF ===
In: Note: Flags indicate national team as defined under FIFA eligibility rules; some limited exceptions apply. Players may hold more than one non-FIFA nationality.

| No. | Pos. | Nation | Player |
|---|---|---|---|
| — | DF | SWE | Linus Malmborg (on loan from Gefle IF) (Note: "Malmborg till Assyriska" (in Swedish). gifsundsvall.se. 2013-01-30.) |
| — | MF | SWE | Amin Nazari (on loan from Malmö FF) |

Out: Note: Flags indicate national team as defined under FIFA eligibility rules; some limited exceptions apply. Players may hold more than one non-FIFA nationality.

| No. | Pos. | Nation | Player |
|---|---|---|---|
| — | DF | ESP | Ubay Luzardo (free transfer) (Note: "Ingen fortsättning för Luzardo, Azin & Vaitsiakhovich" (in Swedish). assyriska.se. 2012-11-13.) |
| — | DF | GER | David Azin (free transfer) |
| — | GK | BLR | Filip Vaytekhovich (free transfer) |
| — | MF | SWE | Philip Hellquist (on loan from Djurgårdens IF) |

=== Degerfors IF ===
In: Note: Flags indicate national team as defined under FIFA eligibility rules; some limited exceptions apply. Players may hold more than one non-FIFA nationality.

| No. | Pos. | Nation | Player |
|---|---|---|---|
| — | DF | SWE | Jonas Olsson (from Gefle IF) |

Out: Note: Flags indicate national team as defined under FIFA eligibility rules; some limited exceptions apply. Players may hold more than one non-FIFA nationality.

| No. | Pos. | Nation | Player |

=== Falkenbergs FF ===
In: Note: Flags indicate national team as defined under FIFA eligibility rules; some limited exceptions apply. Players may hold more than one non-FIFA nationality.

| No. | Pos. | Nation | Player |

Out: Note: Flags indicate national team as defined under FIFA eligibility rules; some limited exceptions apply. Players may hold more than one non-FIFA nationality.

| No. | Pos. | Nation | Player |
|---|---|---|---|
| — | GK | SWE | Stojan Lukić (to Halmstads BK) |

=== GAIS ===
In: Note: Flags indicate national team as defined under FIFA eligibility rules; some limited exceptions apply. Players may hold more than one non-FIFA nationality.

| No. | Pos. | Nation | Player |
|---|---|---|---|
| — | DF | SWE | Hampus Andersson (from BK Häcken) (Note: "Hampus och Joel till GAIS" (in Swedish). bkhacken.se. 2012-12-20.) |
| — | FW | SWE | Andreas Drugge (from BK Häcken) (Note: "Drugge klar för GAIS" (in Swedish). bkhacken.se. 2013-02-20.) |
| — | GK | SWE | Tommi Vaiho (from Djurgårdens IF) (Note: "Tommi Vaiho lämnar Djurgården för GAIS" (in Swedish). dif.se. 2013-01-23.) |

Out: Note: Flags indicate national team as defined under FIFA eligibility rules; some limited exceptions apply. Players may hold more than one non-FIFA nationality.

| No. | Pos. | Nation | Player |
|---|---|---|---|
| — | DF | SWE | Erik Johansson (to Malmö FF) (Note: "Erik Johansson klar" (in Swedish). mff.se. 2012-12-12.) |
| — | DF | GHA | Reuben Ayarna (to BK Häcken) (Note: "Ayarna till Häcken" (in Swedish). bkhacken.se. 2013-02-08.) |

=== GIF Sundsvall ===
In: Note: Flags indicate national team as defined under FIFA eligibility rules; some limited exceptions apply. Players may hold more than one non-FIFA nationality.

| No. | Pos. | Nation | Player |
|---|---|---|---|
| — | FW | SWE | Mehmed Hafizovic (loan return from Hudiksvalls FF) |
| — | DF | SWE | Eric Larsson (from Gefle IF) |
| — | MF | SWE | Adam Chennoufi (from Umeå FC) (Note: "Adam Chennoufi väljer GIF Sundsvall" (in Swedish). gifsundsvall.se. 2013-01-06.) |
| — | MF | SWE | Nicklas Maripuu (on loan from AIK) |

Out: Note: Flags indicate national team as defined under FIFA eligibility rules; some limited exceptions apply. Players may hold more than one non-FIFA nationality.

| No. | Pos. | Nation | Player |
|---|---|---|---|
| — | MF | SWE | Emil Forsberg (to Malmö FF) |
| — | DF | SWE | Robert Hammarstedt (to Östersunds FK) (Note: "Ingen Hammarstedt i Sundsvall" (in Swedish). gifsundsvall.se. 2013-02-15.) |
| — | DF | SWE | Fredric Jonson (to IF Brommapojkarna) |

=== Hammarby IF ===
In: Note: Flags indicate national team as defined under FIFA eligibility rules; some limited exceptions apply. Players may hold more than one non-FIFA nationality.

| No. | Pos. | Nation | Player |
|---|---|---|---|
| — | MF | SWE | Christoffer Carlsson (from Falkenbergs FF) |
| — | DF | NED | Michael Timisela (free transfer) |

Out: Note: Flags indicate national team as defined under FIFA eligibility rules; some limited exceptions apply. Players may hold more than one non-FIFA nationality.

| No. | Pos. | Nation | Player |
|---|---|---|---|
| — | DF | GBS | José Monteiro de Macedo (free transfer) |
| — | FW | SWE | Max Forsberg (free transfer) |
| — | MF | SWE | Fredrik Forsberg (free transfer) |
| — | DF | SWE | Fadi Malke (free transfer) |
| — | GK | SWE | George Moussan (free transfer) |
| — | MF | SWE | Sebastian Bojassen (retires) |
| — | MF | ARG | Luis Antonio Rodríguez (free transfer) |
| — | MF | SWE | Andreas Dahl (free transfer) |
| — | DF | SWE | Marcus Törnstrand (free transfer) |
| — | MF | SWE | Luca Sciacca (free transfer) |

=== IFK Värnamo ===
In: Note: Flags indicate national team as defined under FIFA eligibility rules; some limited exceptions apply. Players may hold more than one non-FIFA nationality.

| No. | Pos. | Nation | Player |

Out: Note: Flags indicate national team as defined under FIFA eligibility rules; some limited exceptions apply. Players may hold more than one non-FIFA nationality.

| No. | Pos. | Nation | Player |
|---|---|---|---|
| — | MF | SWE | Vladica Zlojutro (to Östers IF) |
| — | MF | SWE | Jonathan Ring (to Kalmar FF) |

=== IK Brage ===
In: Note: Flags indicate national team as defined under FIFA eligibility rules; some limited exceptions apply. Players may hold more than one non-FIFA nationality.

| No. | Pos. | Nation | Player |
|---|---|---|---|
| — | FW | GAM | Njogu Demba-Nyrén (from Esbjerg fB) |

Out: Note: Flags indicate national team as defined under FIFA eligibility rules; some limited exceptions apply. Players may hold more than one non-FIFA nationality.

| No. | Pos. | Nation | Player |
|---|---|---|---|
| — | MF | UKR | Vyacheslav Jevtushenko (free transfer) |
| — | GK | SWE | Gerhard Andersson (free transfer) |

=== Landskrona BoIS ===
In: Note: Flags indicate national team as defined under FIFA eligibility rules; some limited exceptions apply. Players may hold more than one non-FIFA nationality.

| No. | Pos. | Nation | Player |
|---|---|---|---|
| — | DF | KOS | Liridon Leçi (from Kalmar FF) |
| — | FW | SWE | Alexander Nilsson (on loan from Malmö FF) |
| — | DF | SWE | Tobias Malm (on loan from Malmö FF) |
| — | MF | SWE | Christopher Tapper Holter (from Kristianstads FF) |
| — | GK | SWE | Bill Halvorsen (from IFK Värnamo) |
| — | MF | SWE | Andreas Dahl (from Hammarby IF) |

Out: Note: Flags indicate national team as defined under FIFA eligibility rules; some limited exceptions apply. Players may hold more than one non-FIFA nationality.

| No. | Pos. | Nation | Player |
|---|---|---|---|
| — | GK | SWE | Peter Karlsson (retire) |
| — | FW | TOG | Abdou-Fatawou Dodja (loan return to AS Douanes) |
| — | MF | SWE | Marcus Lantz (retire) |
| — | FW | SWE | Linus R. Olsson (free transfer) |
| — | DF | SWE | Alexander Zaim (free transfer) |
| — | DF | SWE | Fredrik Liverstam (to Halmstads BK) |
| — | GK | SWE | Ivo Vazgec (free transfer) |

=== Ljungskile SK ===
In: Note: Flags indicate national team as defined under FIFA eligibility rules; some limited exceptions apply. Players may hold more than one non-FIFA nationality.

| No. | Pos. | Nation | Player |
|---|---|---|---|
| — | MF | SWE | Amir Suljic (from Åtvidabergs FF) |

Out: Note: Flags indicate national team as defined under FIFA eligibility rules; some limited exceptions apply. Players may hold more than one non-FIFA nationality.

| No. | Pos. | Nation | Player |
|---|---|---|---|
| — | MF | ENG | Kenny Pavey (to Östers IF) (Note: "Kenny Pavey till Östers IF" (in Swedish). ostersif.se.) |
| — | FW | BRA | Bruno Santos (loan return to IFK Norrköping) (Note: "Ljungskile lånar två spelare ifrån Norrköping" (in Swedish). lsk.se. 2012-03-01.) |

=== Varbergs BoIS FC ===
In: Note: Flags indicate national team as defined under FIFA eligibility rules; some limited exceptions apply. Players may hold more than one non-FIFA nationality.

| No. | Pos. | Nation | Player |
|---|---|---|---|
| — | MF | BIH | Armin Tanković (on loan from IFK Norrköping) |
| — | DF | TUR | Erkan Sağlık (from Al-Salmiya) |

Out: Note: Flags indicate national team as defined under FIFA eligibility rules; some limited exceptions apply. Players may hold more than one non-FIFA nationality.

| No. | Pos. | Nation | Player |
|---|---|---|---|
| — | MF | SWE | Jonatan Berg (free transfer) |
| — | MF | SWE | Christoffer Karlsson (loan return to Åtvidabergs FF) |

=== Ängelholms FF ===
In: Note: Flags indicate national team as defined under FIFA eligibility rules; some limited exceptions apply. Players may hold more than one non-FIFA nationality.

| No. | Pos. | Nation | Player |
|---|---|---|---|
| — | GK | SWE | Linus Müller (on loan from Helsingborgs IF) |
| — | DF | SWE | Filip Stenström (on loan from Malmö FF) |

Out: Note: Flags indicate national team as defined under FIFA eligibility rules; some limited exceptions apply. Players may hold more than one non-FIFA nationality.

| No. | Pos. | Nation | Player |
|---|---|---|---|
| — | GK | SWE | Hampus Nilsson (from Ängelholms FF) |

=== Örebro SK ===
In: Note: Flags indicate national team as defined under FIFA eligibility rules; some limited exceptions apply. Players may hold more than one non-FIFA nationality.

| No. | Pos. | Nation | Player |
|---|---|---|---|
| — | MF | SWE | Josef Ibrahim (loan return from Syrianska FC) |
| — | FW | SLE | Alhassan Kamara (on loan from AIK) |
| — | MF | SWE | Tobias Nilsson (from Åtvidabergs FF) |

Out: Note: Flags indicate national team as defined under FIFA eligibility rules; some limited exceptions apply. Players may hold more than one non-FIFA nationality.

| No. | Pos. | Nation | Player |
|---|---|---|---|
| — | FW | SLE | Alhassan Kamara (loan return to AIK) |
| — | DF | ISL | Eiður Sigurbjörnsson (on loan to ÍBV) |
| — | FW | SWE | Andreas Haddad (to IF Brommapojkarna) |

=== Östersunds FK ===
In: Note: Flags indicate national team as defined under FIFA eligibility rules; some limited exceptions apply. Players may hold more than one non-FIFA nationality.

| No. | Pos. | Nation | Player |
|---|---|---|---|
| — | DF | SWE | Robert Hammarstedt (from GIF Sundsvall) |

Out: Note: Flags indicate national team as defined under FIFA eligibility rules; some limited exceptions apply. Players may hold more than one non-FIFA nationality.

| No. | Pos. | Nation | Player |
