= Gruda =

Gruda may refer to:

== Places ==
- Gruda, Croatia, a village in Konavle Municipality, Croatia
- Gruda, Danilovgrad, a village in Danilovgrad Municipality, Montenegro
- Gruda, Bartoszyce County, a village in Bartoszyce County, Poland
- Gruda, Ostróda County, a village in Ostróda County, Poland
- Grudë, Albania, a village in Gruemirë Municipality, Albania
- Gruda (region), a region and historic Albanian tribe
- Grūda (lake), a lake between Lithuania and Belarus border
- Grūda (river), a river in south Lithuania.

== People ==
- Gruda (surname), list of people with the surname
- Gruda (tribe), Northern Albanian tribe
