= Mamadou Fofana =

Mamadou Fofana may refer to:

- Mamadou Fofana (footballer, born 1988), French football midfielder
- Mamadou Fofana (footballer, born 1995), Ivorian football midfielder
- Mamadou Fofana (footballer, born 1998), Malian football midfielder for New England Revolution
- Mamadou Fofana (footballer, born 2000), Mauritanian football midfielder for Aarau
- Mamadou Fofana (swimmer), Malian swimmer; see Mali at the 2011 World Aquatics Championships
