= Sundqvist =

Sundqvist is a Swedish-language surname. Persons with the surname include:

- Björn-Erik Sundqvist (born 1988), Finnish footballer
- Bo Sundqvist (born 1941), Swedish physicist
- Christoffer Sundqvist, Finnish clarinetist
- Gösta Sundqvist (1957–2003), Finnish singer-songwriter
- Jarrad Sundqvist (born 1982), Australian rules footballer
- Jörgen Sundqvist (alpine skier) (born 1962), Swedish alpine skier
- Jörgen Sundqvist (ice hockey) (born 1982), Swedish ice hockey player
- Kalle Sundqvist (born 1962), Swedish sprint canoer
- Kati Sundqvist (born 1975), Finnish cross-country skier
- Oskar Sundqvist (born 1994), Swedish ice hockey player
- Sanna Sundqvist (born 1983), Swedish actress
- Stig Sundqvist (1922–2011), Swedish footballer
- Ulf Sundqvist (1945–2023), Finnish politician
