= Istrefi =

Istrefi is an Albanian surname. Notable people with the surname include:

- Era Istrefi (born 1994), Kosovar singer
- Gzim Istrefi (born 1991), Swedish footballer of Albanian descent
- Nora Istrefi (born 1986), Kosovar singer
- Valdrin Istrefi (born 1991), Macedonian-Liechtensteiner mixed martial artist
