= Gruda (surname) =

Gruda is a surname. Notable people with the surname include:

- Agnès Gruda, Polish-born Canadian journalist and fiction writer
- Ayşen Gruda (1944–2019), Turkish actress and comedian
- Brajan Gruda (born 2004), German football player
- Ildi Gruda (born 1999), Albanian football player
- Mirsad Gruda (born 1986), Albanian football player
- Sandrine Gruda (born 1987), French basketball player
- Suad Gruda (born 1991), Macedonian-born Swedish football player
- Yılmaz Gruda (1930–2023), Turkish actor, poet, playwright, and translator
