= Daniel Leino =

Swedish footballer

Personal information
- Full name: Daniel Leino
- Date of birth: 29 August 1991 (age 35)
- Place of birth: Sweden
- Height: 1.86 m (6 ft 1 in)
- Position: Midfielder

Team information
- Current team: Strömsbergs IF
- Number: 20

Youth career
- Gävle GIK

Senior career*
Years	Team	Apps	(Gls)
2009–2012	Gefle IF	2	(0)
2012–	Strömsbergs IF	16	(5)
- * Club domestic league appearances and goals as of 11:48, 6 May 2012 (UTC)

Daniel Leino (born 29 August 1991) is a Swedish footballer who plays for Strömsbergs IF as a midfielder.
