= Petter Augustsson =

Swedish retired footballer

Personal information
- Full name: Petter Augustsson
- Date of birth: 24 June 1980 (age 46)
- Place of birth: Sweden
- Height: 1.91 m (6 ft 3 in)
- Position: Goalkeeper

Senior career*
Years	Team	Apps	(Gls)
1997	GIF Sundsvall		
1998–1999	Newcastle		
1999	Luleå FC		
2000–2007	Umeå	115	(0)
2008	Boden		
2009–2010	Ängelholm	11	(0)
2010	Kristianstad		
2011	Umedalen	20	(0)
2012–2014	Östersund	51	(0)
2014–2016	Umeå	30	(0)
- * Club domestic league appearances and goals

Petter Augustsson (born 24 June 1980) is a Swedish retired footballer who played as a goalkeeper
