= Adam Chennoufi =

Swedish footballer

Personal information
- Full name: Adam Chennoufi
- Date of birth: 4 July 1988 (age 38)
- Place of birth: Umeå, Sweden
- Height: 1.75 m (5 ft 9 in)
- Position: Midfielder

Team information
- Current team: Umeå FC (on loan from Team TG FF)
- Number: 8

Youth career
- –2004: Gimonäs CK

Senior career*
Years	Team	Apps	(Gls)
2005	Gimonäs CK		
2006	Mariehem SK		
2007	IFK Holmsund		
2008	Ersboda SK	24	(6)
2009–2012	Umeå FC	87	(15)
2013–2015	GIF Sundsvall	83	(9)
2016	Dubai CSC		
2016	IFK Värnamo	13	(1)
2017–2021	Team TG FF	76	(19)
2020	→ Umeå FC (loan)	9	(1)
2021–	Umeå FC		
- * Club domestic league appearances and goals as of 03:30, 20 September 2021 (UTC)

Adam Chennoufi (born 4 July 1988) is a Swedish footballer who plays as a midfielder for Umeå FC.

== Career ==
On 4 February 2020, Chennoufi returned to Umeå FC on a season-long loan deal from Team TG FF.
