= Johan Eiswohld =

Swedish footballer

Personal information
- Full name: Johan Eiswohld
- Date of birth: 21 June 1990 (age 36)
- Place of birth: Sweden
- Height: 1.86 m (6 ft 1 in)
- Positions: Midfielder; central defender

Youth career
- –2007: Lunds BK
- 2007–2008: Helsingborgs IF

Senior career*
Years	Team	Apps	(Gls)
2008–2012	Helsingborgs IF	11	(0)
2012–2017	Ängelholms FF	71	(3)
2017–2018	IK Sirius	30	(0)

International career^{‡}
2007	Sweden U17	2	(0)
2008–2010	Sweden U19	4	(0)
2010–2012	Sweden U21	2	(0)
- * Club domestic league appearances and goals as of 28 May 2019 ‡ National team caps and goals as of 19 February 2018

Johan Eiswohld (born 21 June 1990) is a Swedish footballer.

== Career ==
=== Early career ===
Eiswohld came up through the ranks at Lunds BK before moving to Helsingborg in 2007.

=== Helsingborgs ===
Eiswohld was a product of the Helsingborgs academy. He spent four years with the club, only making eleven league appearances.

=== Angelholm ===
In March 2012, Eiswohld moved to Ängelholms FF in the Superettan. He made his league debut on 6 April 2012 in a 1-1 draw with Trelleborg. He was subbed on for Tobias Johansson in the 74th minute. His first career goal came on 28 May 2012 in a 3-1 win over Umeå FC. His goal came was the last of the game and came in the 80th minute.

=== Sirius ===
In January 2017, Eiswohld was sold to IK Sirius. He made his league debut on 3 April 2017 in a 2-0 win against Djurgården.

== Honors ==
Helsingborgs

Allsvenskan: 2011

Svenska Cupen: 2010, 2011

Svenska Supercupen: 2011
