= Zeyn S-Latef =

Polish footballer (born 1990)

Personal information
- Full name: Zeyn Al-Abidyn S-Latef
- Date of birth: 22 July 1990 (age 36)
- Place of birth: Helsingborg, Sweden
- Height: 1.78 m (5 ft 10 in)
- Position: Defender

Youth career
- Kävlinge GIF
- Helsingborg
- Olimpia Poznań
- 2003–2004: Feyenoord
- 2005–2007: Helsingborg
- 2008–2009: Sheffield United FC

Senior career*
Years	Team	Apps	(Gls)
2010	Sandnes Ulf	4	(0)
2011	Syrianska IF	18	(0)
2012–2016	Ängelholm	56	(1)
2017–2019	Vejby IF	50	(19)

International career
2007	Poland U17	6	(1)
2008	Poland U18	3	(0)
2009	Poland U19	4	(0)
- * Club domestic league appearances and goals

Zeyn Al-Abidyn S-Latef (born 22 July 1990) is a former professional footballer who played as a defender. Born in Sweden, he represented Poland as a youth international.

== Early life ==
S-Latef was born in 1990. He spent the early years of his life in Sweden where he was born, before returning to his mother’s home country at the age of thirteen.

== Club career ==
S-Latef started his career with Norwegian side Sandnes Ulf. In 2011, he signed for Swedish side Syrianska IF Kerburan. In 2012, he signed for Swedish side Ängelholms FF. In 2017, he signed for Swedish side Vejby IF. He was described as "plagued by serious injuries" during his career.

== International career ==
S-Latef was a Poland youth international. He was regarded as one of the Poland national under-16 football team's most important players.

== Style of play ==
S-Latef previously operated as a midfielder. He was described as having "impeccable technique". He received comparisons to France international Zinedine Zidane.

== Personal life ==
S-Latef is of Iraqi descent. He was born to an Iraqi father and Polish mother. He has an older brother and sister.
