= Anton Lans =

Swedish footballer

Personal information
- Full name: Anton Oskar Bertil Lans
- Date of birth: 17 April 1991 (age 35)
- Place of birth: Lidköping, Sweden
- Height: 1.82 m (5 ft 11 1/2 in)
- Position: Centre back

Youth career
- Vinninga AIF
- Lidköpings IF
- 2007–2010: IF Elfsborg

Senior career*
Years	Team	Apps	(Gls)
2010–2015	IF Elfsborg	24	(1)
2011–2012	→ Falkenbergs FF (loan)	24	(1)
2016–2017	Gefle IF	39	(0)
2018–2022	Örgryte IS	108	(3)

International career
2006–2008	Sweden U17	9	(0)
2008–2010	Sweden U19	7	(0)
2011	Sweden U21	1	(0)
- * Club domestic league appearances and goals as of 1 November 2023

Anton Lans (born 17 April 1991) is a Swedish footballer who played for IF Elfsborg, Falkenbergs FF, Gefle IF and Örgryte IS as a defender. He was capped for youth international up until Sweden U21.
