= Pilip Vaitsiakhovich =

Belarusian footballer

Personal information
- Date of birth: 26 March 1990 (age 36)
- Place of birth: Molodechno, Minsk Oblast, Belarusian SSR, Soviet Union
- Height: 1.94 m (6 ft 4 1/2 in)
- Position: Goalkeeper

Youth career
- 2007: Partizan Minsk

Senior career*
Years	Team	Apps	(Gls)
2008–2010	Partizan Minsk	2	(0)
2008	→ Polotsk (loan)	12	(0)
2011–2012	Frej	10	(0)
2012	Assyriska	0	(0)
2013	Dinamo Brest	0	(0)
2013	Vedrich-97 Rechytsa	7	(0)
2014–2015	AFC United	16	(0)
2016	Umeå	13	(0)
2016	Trollhättan	1	(0)
2017	IFK Värnamo	0	(0)
2018	Vasalund	25	(0)
2019–2023	IFK Värnamo	102	(0)

International career
2007	Belarus U17	1	(0)
2008	Belarus U18	1	(0)
2008–2009	Belarus U19	6	(0)
2011–2012	Belarus U21	6	(0)
- * Club domestic league appearances and goals as of 15 November 2023

Pilip Vaitsiakhovich (Belarusian: Філіп Вайцяховiч; Russian: Филипп Войтехович; born 26 March 1990) is a Belarusian professional footballer who plays as a goalkeeper. Besides Belarus, he has played in Sweden.

== Career ==
Vaitsiakhovich began his career with Partizan Minsk and played in the 2008 season twelve games on loan for FC Polotsk in the First League. On 3 February 2011 Vaitsiakhovich left his homeland and signed with Swedish club IK Frej.

== International career ==
Vaitsiakhovich played one game for the Belarus national under-17 football team, one for the Belarus U-18 national team and won six caps for the Belarus U-19 national team. He has also been capped 5 times for the Belarus U21 side.
