= Grūda (lake) =

Lake in Lithuania and Belarus

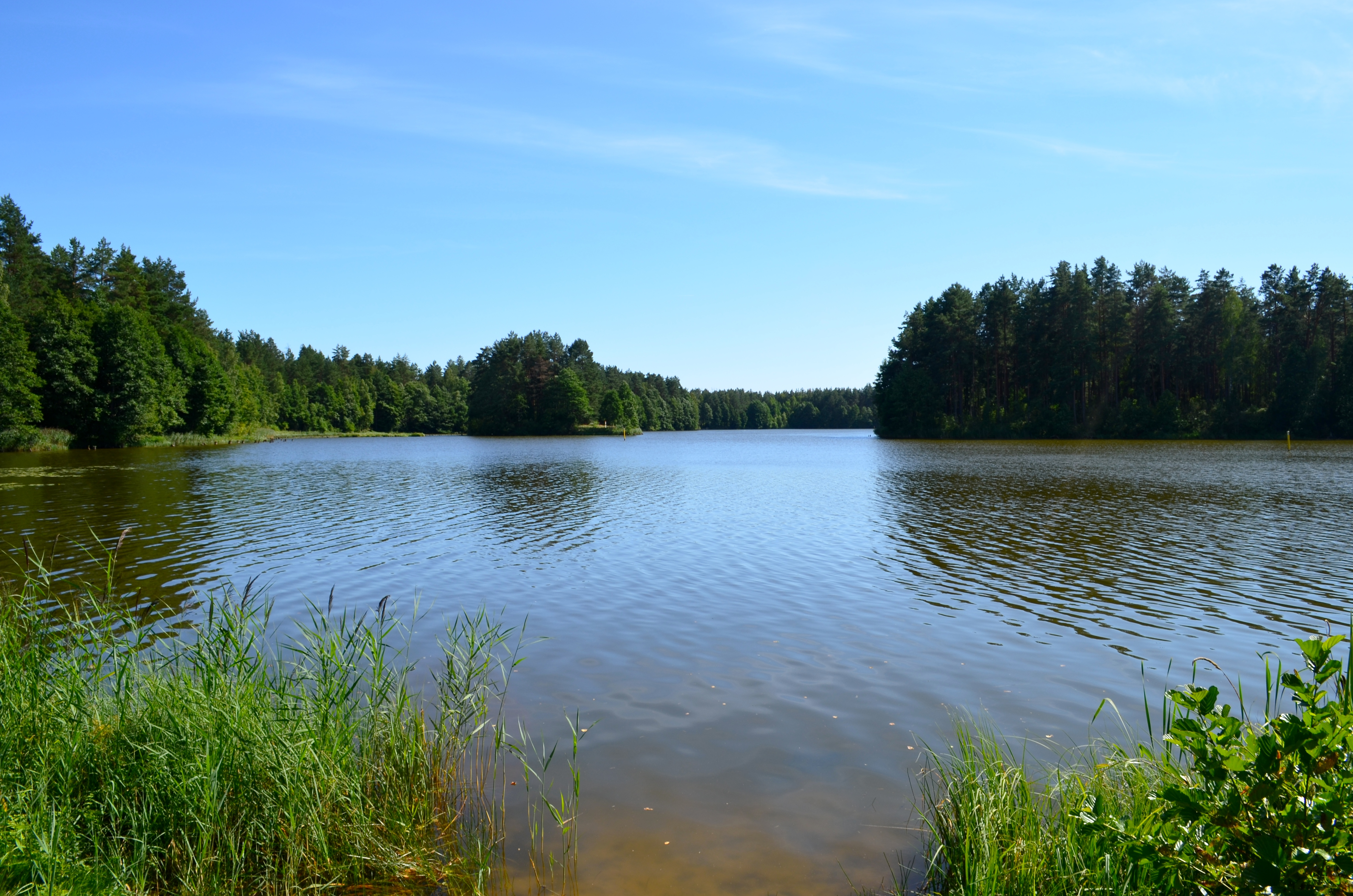
- View from the Lithuanian side to the Belarusian shore

- Location within Lithuania
- Coordinates: 53°56′N 24°18′E
- Primary outflows: Grūda river
- Basin countries: Lithuania, Belarus
- Max. length: 6.3 km (3.9 mi)
- Max. width: 0.3 km (0.19 mi)
- Surface area: 1.2 km^{2} (0.46 sq mi)
- Average depth: 2.5 m (8 ft 2 in)
- Max. depth: 5.2 m (17 ft)
- Surface elevation: 122.4 m (402 ft)

Grūda is a lake located near Ašašninkai at the border between Lithuania and Belarus. The lake is spread across Varėna district in Lithuania and Grodno district in Belarus, and is shared by the two countries.

== Geography ==
Grūda lake located near Ašašninkai at the border between Lithuania and Belarus. The lake is spread across Varėna district in Lithuania and Grodno district in Belarus, and is shared by the two countries. It is the source of the Grūda river, which flows for 45 km (28 mi) before joining the Merkys river, about 14 km (8.7 mi) from its mouth.

The lake is spread over an area of 1.2 km^{2} (0.46 sq mi) at an altitude of 122.4 m (402 ft). It is an elongated lake with a length of about 6.3 km (3.9 mi) and a shorter width of about 0.3 km (0.19 mi). The coastline stretches for about 13 km (8.1 mi). The average depth is around 2.5 m (8 ft 2 in) while the maximum depth is more than 5.2 m (17 ft) (near the only lake's island).

== Flora and fauna ==
The lake consists of small fishes of up to 30 cm (12 in) in length. The area around the lake is surrounded by pine forests with some alder and fir trees. The region is part of a Ramsar wetland, which encompasses more than 21 lakes and surrounding forests in the region. The wetland consists of about 227 species of vertebrates, including 36 species of mammals, 176 species of birds, six species of reptiles and nine amphibians. More than 669 plant species have been recorded in the region.
