= Johan Niklasson =

Swedish footballer

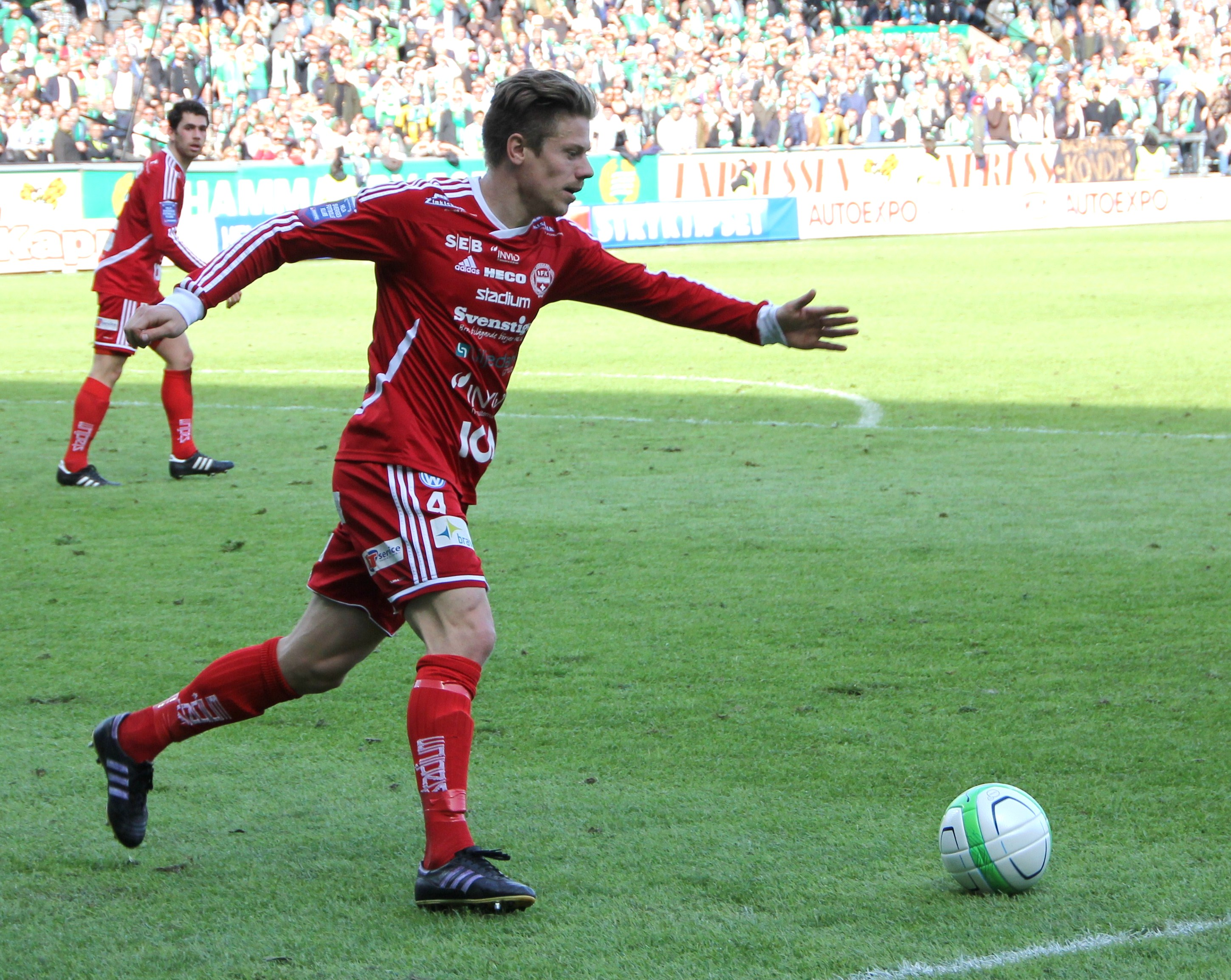

Personal information
- Date of birth: 17 January 1985 (age 41)
- Place of birth: Sweden
- Height: 1.78 m (5 ft 10 in)
- Position: Defender

Team information
- Current team: Oskarshamns AIK
- Number: 3

Youth career
- Oskarshamns AIK
- Kalmar FF

Senior career*
Years	Team	Apps	(Gls)
2006–2010	Åtvidabergs FF	123	(6)
2011	Jönköpings Södra IF	15	(2)
2012–2013	IFK Värnamo	53	(2)
2014–	Oskarshamns AIK	123	(5)

International career
2000–2001	Sweden U16	5	(0)
2001–2002	Sweden U17	18	(1)
- * Club domestic league appearances and goals as of 17 October 2018

Johan Niklasson (born 17 January 1985) is a Swedish footballer who plays for Oskarshamns AIK as a defender.
