= Ahmet Özdemirok =

Swedish footballer

Personal information
- Full name: Ahmet Özdemirok
- Date of birth: January 25, 1981 (age 45)
- Place of birth: Flemingsberg, Stockholm, Sweden
- Height: 1.76 m (5 ft 9 in)
- Position: Midfielder

Team information
- Current team: Varbergs BoIS FC
- Number: 22

Youth career
- Flemingsbergs IF

Senior career*
Years	Team	Apps	(Gls)
2001–2002	Hammarby IF	0	(0)
2002	Spårvägens FF	7	(0)
2005	Gençlerbirliği		
2006–2011	Syrianska FC	74	(0)
2012	Varbergs BoIS FC	15	(0)
- * Club domestic league appearances and goals as of 15 April 2011

Ahmet Özdemirok (born 25 January 1981) is a Swedish former footballer.
