= Gruda, Danilovgrad =

Gruda Груда
- Village
- Location within Montenegro
- Coordinates: 42.517599°N 19.115213°E
- Country: Montenegro
- Municipality: Danilovgrad

Population (2011)
  - Total: 167
- Time zone: UTC+1 (CET)
  - Summer (DST): UTC+2 (CEST)

Gruda (Serbian Cyrillic: Груда) is a small village in the municipality of Danilovgrad, Montenegro.

== Demographics ==
According to the 2011 census, its population was 167.

Ethnicity in 2011
Ethnicity	Number	Percentage
Montenegrins	128	76.6%
Serbs	27	16.2%
other/undeclared	12	7.2%
Total	167	100%
