= Grūda (river) =

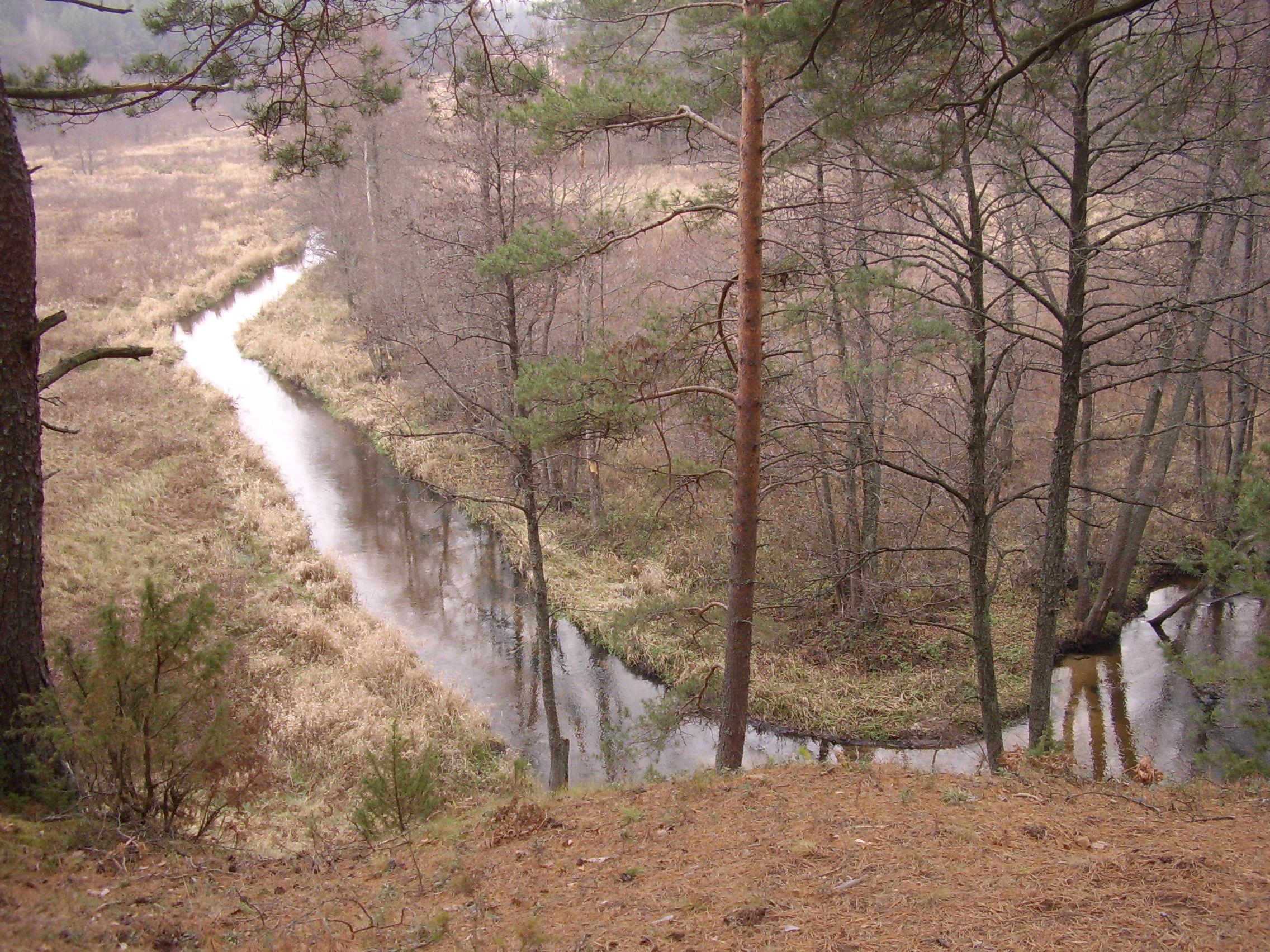
- river near Marcinkonys village

Location
- Country: Lithuania

Physical characteristics
- Source
  - location: Grūda (lake)
- Mouth: Merkys
  - coordinates: 54°09′50″N 24°20′11″E
- Length: 36 km (22 mi)
- Basin size: 248 km^{2} (96 sq mi)
- Discharge
  - average: 1.88 m^{3}/s (66 cu ft/s)

Basin features
- Progression: Merkys→ Neman→ Baltic Sea

Grūda is a river in Dzūkija National Park in southern Lithuania.

It begins near the state border of Lithuania and Belarus, in the Dainava Forest, in a lake called Grūda, running across the Dainava plain. In Puvočiai, it flows into the Merkis. Thanks to the sandy soil and growing forests, the rivers in this area are characterized by their clear, cool waters. Because they are primarily fed by underground springs, they do not freeze every winter. Even during the often dry summers, the rivers remain relatively full and suitable for boating.
