= Ibrahim Kallay =

Sierra Leonean footballer

Personal information
- Date of birth: 6 September 1993 (age 33)
- Position: Midfielder

Team information
- Current team: Piteå IF
- Number: 6

Senior career*
Years	Team	Apps	(Gls)
2011–2015	FC Kallon		
2012	→ Umeå FC	13	(1)
2013–2015	→ IFK Luleå	67	(12)
2016–	Piteå IF	20	(3)

International career^{‡}
2014–	Sierra Leone	1	(0)
- * Club domestic league appearances and goals as of 16 April 2017 (UTC) ‡ National team caps and goals as of 14:56, 22 June 2014 (UTC)

Ibrahim Kallay (born 6 September 1993) is a Sierra Leonean international footballer who plays for Piteå IF as a midfielder.

== Career ==
Kallay has played club football for FC Kallon, Umeå and Luleå.

He made his international debut for Sierra Leone in 2014.
