= Armin Tanković =

Bosnian footballer

Personal information
- Full name: Armin Tanković
- Date of birth: 22 March 1990 (age 36)
- Place of birth: SR Bosnia and Herzegovina, Yugoslavia
- Height: 1.77 m (5 ft 9 1/2 in)
- Position: Midfielder

Youth career
- 1995–1999: Norrköpings IF Bosna
- 1999: Hagahöjdens BK
- 2000–2006: IF Sylvia

Senior career*
Years	Team	Apps	(Gls)
2007–2008	IF Sylvia	31	(1)
2009–2014	IFK Norrköping	50	(4)
2013	→ Varbergs BoIS (loan)	17	(1)
2014	IK Sirius	6	(0)
2015	Dalkurd FF	24	(1)
2016	Olimpic Sarajevo	0	(0)
2016–2017	Karlstad BK	29	(1)
2018–2019	Assyriska	0	(0)
2020–2021	Nacka Iliria	25	(7)

International career
2012	Bosnia and Herzegovina U21	1	(0)
- * Club domestic league appearances and goals as of 30 January 2018

Armin Tanković (born 22 March 1990) is a Bosnian retired footballer who played as a central midfielder.

His cousin, Muamer Tanković, is also a professional football player.
