= Mamadou Fofana (footballer, born 1995) =

Ivorian footballer

Personal information
- Date of birth: 21 May 1995 (age 31)
- Place of birth: Bamako, Ivory Coast
- Height: 1.82 m (6 ft 0 in)
- Position: Midfielder

Senior career*
Years	Team	Apps	(Gls)
2014–2015	Saxan	12	(1)
2015	Zaria Bălți	1	(0)
2016–2017	Saxan	19	(2)
Total		32	(3)
- * Club domestic league appearances and goals

Mamadou Fofana (born 21 May 1995) is an Ivorian former footballer who played professionally in Moldova.

== Career statistics ==
=== Club ===
Club	Season	League			Cup		Continental		Other		Total	
Club	Season	Division	Apps	Goals	Apps	Goals	Apps	Goals	Apps	Goals	Apps	Goals
Saxan	2014–15	Divizia Națională	12	1	0	0	0	0	0	0	12	1
Saxan	2015–16	Divizia Națională	0	0	0	0	2 (Note: Appearances in UEFA Europa League qualifying)	0	0	0	2	0
Saxan	Total		12	1	0	0	2	0	0	0	14	1
Zaria Bălți	2015–16	Divizia Națională	1	0	0	0	0	0	0	0	1	0
Saxan	2016–17	Divizia Națională	19	2	1 (Note: Appearances in the Moldovan Cup)	0	0	0	0	0	20	2
Career total			32	3	1	0	2	0	0	0	35	3
