= Johan Pettersson (footballer, born 1989) =

Dutch-born Swedish footballer

Personal information
- Full name: Johan Pettersson
- Date of birth: 8 September 1989 (age 37)
- Place of birth: Amsterdam, Netherlands
- Height: 1.82 m (5 ft 11 1/2 in)
- Position: Midfielder

Youth career
- Mölnlycke IF

Senior career*
Years	Team	Apps	(Gls)
2008–2012	GAIS	8	(0)
2009	→ Skövde AIK (loan)	8	(0)
2011	→ Varbergs BoIS (loan)	0	(0)
2012	→ Örgryte IS (loan)	9	(0)
- * Club domestic league appearances and goals

Johan Pettersson (born 8 September 1989) is a Dutch-born Swedish footballer who plays as a midfielder. He is a free agent and his latest club was GAIS. He is son of the former Ajax and Sweden national team player Stefan Pettersson.
