= Viktor Rönneklev =

Swedish footballer

Personal information
- Full name: Viktor Johan Anders Rönneklev
- Date of birth: 16 August 1982 (age 44)
- Place of birth: Sweden
- Height: 1.77 m (5 ft 10 in)
- Position: Defender

Youth career
- Bankeryds SK

Senior career*
Years	Team	Apps	(Gls)
2001–2003	Husqvarna FF		
2004–2011	IFK Norrköping	169	(6)
2012–2016	Jönköpings Södra IF	114	(4)
- * Club domestic league appearances and goals

Viktor Rönneklev (born 16 August 1982) is a Swedish retired footballer who played as a defender.
