= Fredric Jonson =

Swedish footballer

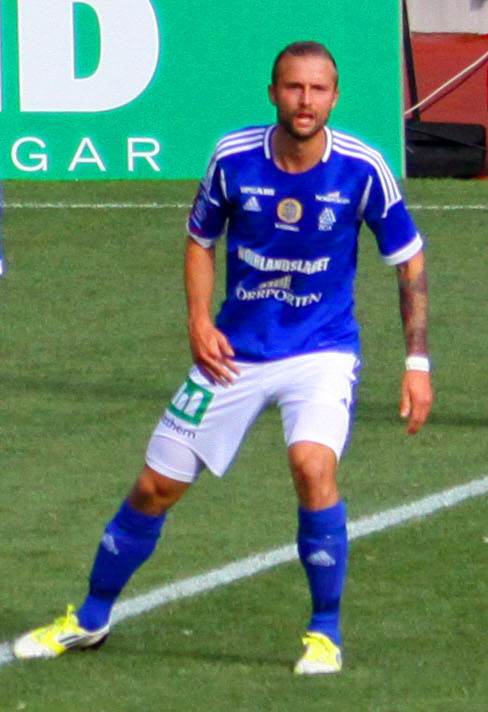

Personal information
- Full name: Hans Fredric Jonson
- Date of birth: 15 July 1987 (age 39)
- Place of birth: Stockholm, Sweden
- Height: 1.85 m (6 ft 1 in)
- Position: Defender

Youth career
- 2002–2004: Helenelunds IK

Senior career*
Years	Team	Apps	(Gls)
2005	IFK Sollentuna	24	(3)
2006–2007	Vasalund/Essinge IF	32	(1)
2008–2010	Vasalunds IF	54	(1)
2010–2012	GIF Sundsvall	76	(3)
2013–2015	IF Brommapojkarna	36	(1)
- * Club domestic league appearances and goals as of 10 January 2016

Fredric Jonson (born 15 July 1987) is a Swedish former footballer who played as a defender.

== Career ==
Jonson began his professional career in 2005 with Swedish club IFK Sollentuna appearing in 24 matches and scoring 3 goals. In 2006, he was transferred to Vasalund/Essinge IF which then played in Division 1. Prior to joining Vasalund he had a trial spell with Benfica. With his new club he quickly established himself as a starter, initially playing primarily at right back, and later converting to center back. In 2009, he appeared in 29 matches, playing a full 90 in all appearances. With Vasalund/Essinge IF and Vasalunds IF he appeared in 86 league matches, scoring 2 goals.

During the 2010 off-season Jonson went on trial with New York Red Bulls but the club did not sign him.
