= Jonas Olsson (footballer, born 1990) =

Swedish footballer

Personal information
- Full name: Jonas Olsson
- Date of birth: 21 March 1990 (age 36)
- Place of birth: Sweden
- Position: Defender

Youth career
- Töcksfors IF

Senior career*
Years	Team	Apps	(Gls)
2009–2010	Carlstad United	48	(2)
2011–2012	Degerfors IF	51	(4)
2013–2015	Gefle IF	21	(0)
2016	Carlstad United	9	(0)
2017–2018	Degerfors IF	38	(0)
2019	Carlstad United	20	(0)
- * Club domestic league appearances and goals as of 14:22, 1 April 2020 (UTC)

Jonas Olsson (born 21 March 1990) is a Swedish footballer who most recently played for Degerfors IF as a defender.
