= Björn-Erik Sundqvist =

Finnish footballer (born 1988)

Personal information
- Date of birth: 5 March 1988 (age 38)
- Place of birth: Jakobstad, Finland
- Height: 1.83 m (6 ft 0 in)
- Position: Forward

Team information
- Current team: VIFK
- Number: 15

Senior career*
Years	Team	Apps	(Gls)
2005–2006	FF Jaro	7	(0)
2005–2006	JBK (loan)	17	(11)
2007	JBK		
2008	GBK		
2009–2010	FF Jaro	28	(4)
2011	Umeå FC		
2012–	VIFK		
- * Club domestic league appearances and goals

Björn-Erik Sundqvist (born 5 March 1988 in Jakobstad) is a Finnish footballer, who currently plays for VIFK.

== Career ==
He left on 25 February 2011 FF Jaro of the Veikkausliiga and signed with Umeå FC.
