= Mamadou Fofana (footballer, born 1988) =

French footballer

Personal information
- Date of birth: 7 January 1988 (age 38)
- Place of birth: Sarcelles, France
- Position: Midfielder

Senior career*
| Years | Team | Apps | (Gls) |
- Vitré
- Sedan B
| 2008–2010 | Olympique Noisy-le-Sec | 28 | (0) |
| 2010–2011 | La Vitréenne | 20 | (1) |
| 2011 | Syrianska | 2 | (0) |
| 2012–2014 | Lincoln City | 49 | (1) |
| 2014–2015 | Oxford City | 18 | (0) |
| 2015–2016 | Barrow | 9 | (0) |
| 2015 | → Oxford City (loan) | | |
| 2016–2018 | Oxford City | | |
| 2019 | Bangkok | | |
- * Club domestic league appearances and goals

Mamadou Fofana (born 7 January 1988) is a French former footballer who played professionally in Sweden.

== Club career ==
Fofana started his career in the lower divisions of France, before moving to Sweden to sign with Allsvenskan side Syrianska in 2011. He made two appearances for the Södertälje-based side.

After leaving Sweden, Fofana moved to England to join Lincoln City on a short-term deal in August 2012. This deal was then extended in December 2012. After continuing to impress, he signed a one-year deal in May 2013.

In 2014, he signed for Conference North side Oxford City, where he made eighteen appearances. In the summer of 2015, he signed for Barrow, but after failing to break into the first team squad, he was loaned back to Oxford City on a one-month deal in November of the same year. This deal was cut short, and Fofana was recalled after Barrow's squad was depleted by injuries.

In 2018 Fofana left England for Oman, playing for a few months before the club he joined encountered financial problems. He attended a training camp in Thailand in December 2018, before eventually signing with Thai League 3 side Bangkok.

== Career statistics ==
=== Club ===
| Club | Season | League | | | Cup | | Other | | Total | |
| Club | Season | Division | Apps | Goals | Apps | Goals | Apps | Goals | Apps | Goals |
|---|---|---|---|---|---|---|---|---|---|---|
| Olympique Noisy-le-Sec | 2009–10 | CFA | 28 | 0 | 0 | 0 | 0 | 0 | 28 | 0 |
| La Vitréenne | 2010–11 | CFA | 20 | 1 | 0 | 0 | 0 | 0 | 20 | 1 |
| Syrianska | 2011 | Allsvenskan | 2 | 0 | 0 | 0 | 0 | 0 | 2 | 0 |
| Lincoln City | 2012–13 | Conference Premier | 27 | 1 | 4 (Note: Appearances in the FA Cup) | 0 | 0 | 0 | 31 | 1 |
| Lincoln City | 2013–14 | Conference Premier | 22 | 0 | 2 | 0 | 3 | 1 | 27 | 1 |
| Lincoln City | Total | | 49 | 1 | 6 | 0 | 3 | 1 | 58 | 2 |
| Oxford City | 2014–15 | Conference North | 18 | 0 | 0 | 0 | 0 | 0 | 18 | 0 |
| Barrow | 2015–16 | National League | 9 | 0 | 0 | 0 | 0 | 0 | 9 | 0 |
| Career total | | | 15 | 1 | 0 | 0 | 0 | 0 | 18 | 1 |
