= Gzim Istrefi =

Swedish footballer (born 1991)

Personal information
- Date of birth: 18 December 1991 (age 34)
- Place of birth: Kosovska Mitrovica, SFR Yugoslavia
- Height: 1.82 m (6 ft 0 in)
- Position: Forward

Team information
- Current team: Stenungsunds IF

Youth career
- Stenungsunds IF

Senior career*
Years	Team	Apps	(Gls)
2008–2010	Carlstad United	63	(10)
2011–2013	GAIS	5	(0)
2012	→ Ljungskile (loan)	6	(0)
2013	Dalkurd	14	(2)
2014–2015	Karlstad		
2016–2018	Norrby	50	(8)
2019–	Stenungsunds		

International career
2011	Albania U21	1	(0)
- * Club domestic league appearances and goals as of 4 April 2019

Gzim Istrefi (born 18 December 1991) is a Swedish professional footballer who plays for Stenungsunds IF as a forward.

== Club career ==
Istrefi was born Kosovska Mitrovica. His family transferred from Kosovo to Sweden in 1992, when he was only one year old. After spending his youth years with Carlstad United BK, Istrefi was purchased by GAIS. On 8 January 2019, Istrafi joined Stenungsunds IF.

== International career ==
Although Istrefi has a Swedish passport and there has been interest from Sweden, his desire was to play with the Albania national football team as he declared in an interview. His message to the Albania fans, Tifozat Kuq e Zi, was the Albanian slogan Nje Komb, Nje Kombetare (English: One Nation, one National team), which often appears in the stadiums, since Albania has many players from Kosovo.
