= Strömsbergs IF =

Swedish football club

- Full name: Strömsbergs Idrottsförening
- Founded: 1912
- Ground: Strömbergs IP, Heden; Tierp; Sweden
- Capacity: 1,000
- Chairman: Rolf Lindberg; Sören Carlsson (Football)
- Head coach: Jan Lindström
- Coach: Jan-Olov Pettersson
- League: Division 3 Södra Norrland
- 2018: Division 2 Norra Svealand, 14th (Relegated)
Home colours	Away colours

Strömsbergs IF is a Swedish football club located in Tierp in Uppsala County.

== Background ==
Since their foundation Strömsbergs IF has participated mainly in the middle and lower divisions of the Swedish football league system. Following promotion at the end of the 2009 season, the club currently plays in Division 2 Norrland which is the fourth tier of Swedish football. They play their home matches at the Strömbergs IP, Heden in Tierp.

Strömsbergs IF are affiliated to the Upplands Fotbollförbund.

== Season to season ==
Season	Level	Division	Section	Position	Movements
1993	Tier 4	Division 3	Södra Norrland	9th	
1994	Tier 4	Division 3	Södra Norrland	11th	Relegated
1995	Tier 5	Division 4	Uppland	4th	
1996	Tier 5	Division 4	Uppland	6th	
1997	Tier 5	Division 4	Uppland	3rd	
1998	Tier 5	Division 4	Uppland Vårserien Norra	6th	Spring Competition
	Tier 5	Division 4	Uppland Höst	3rd	Autumn Competition
1999	Tier 5	Division 4	Uppland Vårserien Norra	3rd	Spring Competition
	Tier 5	Division 4	Uppland/Gotland Höstserien	5th	Autumn Competition
2000	Tier 5	Division 4	Uppland Västra	6th	Spring Competition
	Tier 5	Division 4	Uppland Höst	3rd	Autumn Competition
2001	Tier 5	Division 4	Uppland	6th	
2002	Tier 5	Division 4	Uppland	4th	
2003	Tier 5	Division 4	Uppland	3rd	Promotion Playoffs
2004	Tier 5	Division 4	Uppland	3rd	Promotion Playoffs
2005	Tier 5	Division 4	Uppland	5th	
2006*	Tier 6	Division 4	Uppland	6th	
2007	Tier 6	Division 4	Uppland	1st	Promoted
2008	Tier 5	Division 3	Norra Svealand	6th	
2009	Tier 5	Division 3	Norra Svealand	1st	Promoted
2010	Tier 4	Division 2	Norra Svealand	3rd	
2011	Tier 4	Division 2	Norra Svealand	7th	
2012	Tier 4	Division 2	Norra Svealand	7th	
2013	Tier 4	Division 2	Norrland	7th	
2014	Tier 4	Division 2	Norra Svealand	12th	
2015	Tier 4	Division 2	Norra Svealand	12th	
2016	Tier 4	Division 2	Norrland	11th	
2017	Tier 4	Division 2	Norra Svealand	11th	

* League restructuring in 2006 resulted in a new division being created at Tier 3 and subsequent divisions dropping a level.

== Attendances ==
In recent seasons Strömsbergs IF have had the following average attendances:

Season	Average attendance	Division / Section	Level
2007	Not available	Div 4 Uppland	Tier 6
2008	134	Div 3 Norra Svealand	Tier 5
2009	241	Div 3 Norra Svealand	Tier 5
2010	295	Div 2 Norra Svealand	Tier 4
2011	221	Div 2 Norra Svealand	Tier 4
2012	186	Div 2 Norra Svealand	Tier 4
2013	204	Div 2 Norraland	Tier 4
2014		Div 2 Norra Svealand	Tier 4

* Attendances are provided in the Publikliga sections of the Svenska Fotbollförbundet website.

The attendance record for Strömsbergs IF was 475 spectators for the match against Sandvikens IF in Division 2 Norra Svealand on 24 June 2010.
