= Suad Gruda =

Footballer (born 1991)

Personal information
- Date of birth: 27 July 1991 (age 35)
- Place of birth: Montenegro, Yugoslavia
- Height: 1.79 m (5 ft 10 in)
- Position: Midfielder

Youth career
- IFK Luleå
- 2007–2008: Degerfors

Senior career*
Years	Team	Apps	(Gls)
2009	IFK Luleå		
2010–2011	Gefle	13	(0)
2012	JIPPO	24	(5)
2013	Nyköpings BIS	13	(1)
2013	Umeå	13	(2)
2014–2019	Nyköpings BIS	106	(14)

International career^{‡}
2011	Montenegro U21	23	(2)
- * Club domestic league appearances and goals as of 30 November 2017 ‡ National team caps and goals as of 26 May 2013

Suad Gruda (born 27 July 1991) is a former professional footballer who played as a midfielder. Born in Montenegro and raised in Sweden, he represented Montenegro U21 national team internationally.

== Club career ==
Gruda was born in Montenegro but his family relocated to Sweden, during the war in former Yugoslavia, and they ended up in Luleå some years after his birth. There he spent his youth years at IFK Luleå before moving to Degerfors IF and then Allsvenskan club Gefle IF in 2010 after having spent a year playing first team football with his original club. After leaving Gefle two years later he played for second tier JIPPO in Finland before signing with Nyköpings BIS in March 2013. On 11 August 2013, Gruda left Nyköpings BIS for Umeå FC, but returned to his old club the next season.

In November 2019, he retired from playing, citing persistent knee problems.

== International career ==
Gruda represented the Montenegro national under-21 football team during several games, one of them against Armenia in the 2013 UEFA European Under-21 Football Championship qualification.
