= Andreas Dahlén =

Swedish footballer

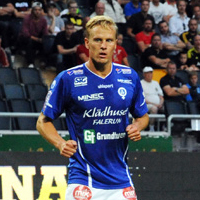
- Dahlén in 2013

Personal information
- Date of birth: 11 December 1982 (age 43)
- Place of birth: Gävle, Sweden
- Height: 1.81 m (5 ft 11 in)
- Position: Defender

Youth career
- –2003: Brynäs IF

Senior career*
Years	Team	Apps	(Gls)
2003	Brynäs IF	27	(5)
2004–2005	IFK Norrköping	32	(0)
2006	Umeå FC	24	(0)
2007–2009	Gefle IF	59	(1)
2010	Hansa Rostock	12	(2)
2010–2012	FSV Frankfurt	20	(0)
2011	→ FSV Frankfurt II	12	(0)
2012	Djurgårdens IF	19	(0)
2013–2015	Åtvidabergs FF	65	(1)
Total		270	(9)
- * Club domestic league appearances and goals

Andreas Dahlén (born 11 December 1982 in Gävle) is a Swedish former professional footballer who played as a defender. He was a defensive specialist and could play at left back, central defender or defensive midfielder.

== Career ==
Dahlén began his professional career 2003 with Brynäs IF before joining IFK Norrköping in January 2004. He played for Norrköping from January 2004 to June 2005. In July 2005, he signed for Umeå FC. He played for Umeå in few games before signing for Gefle IF in January 2007. On 10 December 2009, he announced his departure from Gefle and signed a two-and-a-half-year contract with Hansa Rostock. On 13 June 2010, he left Hansa Rostock and signed for FSV Frankfurt. After having only played one match for his club in the 2011–12 season, his contract was terminated by mutual consent on 16 January 2012.
