= Bruno Santos (footballer, born 1983) =

Brazilian footballer

Personal information
- Full name: Bruno Santos da Silva
- Date of birth: 31 August 1983 (age 43)
- Place of birth: Rio de Janeiro, Brazil
- Height: 1.82 m (6 ft 0 in)
- Position: Forward

Youth career
- 2000–2003: Flamengo

Senior career*
Years	Team	Apps	(Gls)
2003	CFZ-RJ	13	(4)
2004–2007	Norrköping	71	(37)
2007–2009	Figueirense	10	(2)
2009–2010	Châteauroux	7	(0)
2010	Ceará	6	(0)
2010–2013	Norrköping	19	(3)
2012	→ Ljungskile SK (loan)	18	(5)
2013	Noroeste	3	(0)
- * Club domestic league appearances and goals

Bruno Santos da Silva, or simply Bruno Santos, (born 31 August 1983) is a Brazilian former professional footballer who played as a forward.

== Career ==
Bruno Santos was born in Rio de Janeiro. He came to Swedish side IFK Norrköping in the summer of 2004 from Flamengo's academy. He was reported as having spent time in Zico's academy Centro de Futebol Zico Sociedade Esportiva, as well as 90 days in Feyenoord Rotterdam which was cut short due to homesickness. In 2005, he was the top scorer in Superettan with his 17 goals for Norrköping

In 2006 he was unfit, and measurements revealed that he lacked magnesium, potassium, zinc and copper. He had too high levels of calcium, owing to a diet with "too much fish and bananas".

In 2007, the club and Santos both discussed a prolonged contract and a parting of ways. The club was skeptical to his many injuries. He left the club in 2007 after helping to promote the club to Allsvenskan. In total, he scored 37 goals for Norrköping between 2004 and 2007.

Sanntos played for Figueirense, Châteauroux and Ceará until his comeback in IFK Norrköping was announced in June 2010. The transfer was paid for Peking Soccer Invest (Peking being the nickname of IFK Norrköping).

In the summer of 2011 he was out of the team. In 2012, he joined second-tier Ljungskile SK on what became a season-long loan.

He left Sweden in March 2013, before the commencement of the 2013 Allsvenskan.
