= Anders Wikström =

Swedish footballer (born 1981)

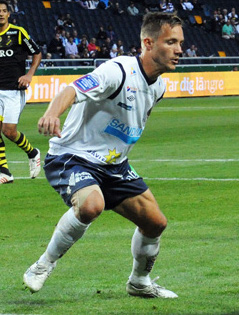

Personal information
- Full name: Anders Johan Wikström
- Date of birth: 14 December 1981 (age 44)
- Place of birth: Sweden
- Height: 1.81 m (5 ft 11 1/2 in)
- Position: Defender

Team information
- Current team: Gefle IF
- Number: 4

Youth career
- Brynäs IF

Senior career*
Years	Team	Apps	(Gls)
2001–2003	Brynäs IF		
2004–2009	Gefle IF	80	(0)
2009–2012	IF Elfsborg	38	(0)
2011	→ IFK Norrköping (loan)	28	(1)
2012	→ Mjällby AIF (loan)	8	(0)
2012	Mjällby AIF	9	(0)
2013–2015	Gefle IF	40	(2)
- * Club domestic league appearances and goals

Anders Wikström (born 14 December 1981) is a Swedish former footballer who played as a defender.
