= Umeå FC =

Association football club in Umeå, Sweden

- Full name: Umeå Fotbollsclub
- Founded: 20 November 1987
- Ground: Umeå Energi Arena, Umeå
- Capacity: 10,000
- Chairman: Torbjörn Bergmark
- Manager: Niklas Vidjeskog
- League: Ettan Norra
- 2025: Superettan, 16th of 16 (relegated)
Home colours	Away colours

Umeå FC is a Swedish professional football club located in Umeå, Sweden. The club, formed in 1987, is currently playing in the second tier of the Swedish league, Superettan. The club is affiliated to the Västerbottens Fotbollförbund. Umeå FC Akademi is Umeå FC's Academy.

== Season to season ==
A chart showing the progress of Umeå FC through the swedish football league system. The different shades of gray represent league divisions and the dotted line represent Tegs SK whose spot was taken over by Umeå FC.

Season	Level	Division	Section	Position	Movements
1993	Tier 2	Division 1	Norra	7th	
1994	Tier 2	Division 1	Norra	2nd	
1995	Tier 2	Division 1	Norra	1st	Promoted
1996	Tier 1	Allsvenskan		11th	Relegated
1997	Tier 2	Division 1	Norra	3rd	
1998	Tier 2	Division 1	Norra	2nd	
1999	Tier 2	Division 1	Norra	7th	
2000	Tier 2	Division 1		13th	
2001	Tier 2	Superettan		15th	Relegated
2002	Tier 3	Division 2	Norrland	2nd	
2003	Tier 3	Division 2	Norrland	4th	
2004	Tier 3	Division 2	Norrland	1st	
2005	Tier 3	Division 2	Norrland	1st	Promoted
2006*	Tier 2	Superettan		16th	Relegated
2007	Tier 3	Division 1	Norra	8th	
2008	Tier 3	Division 1	Norra	5th	
2009	Tier 3	Division 1	Norra	4th	
2010	Tier 3	Division 1	Norra	7th	
2011	Tier 3	Division 1	Norra	1st	Promoted
2012	Tier 2	Superettan		16th	Relegated
2013	Tier 3	Division 1	Norra	6th	
2014	Tier 3	Division 1	Norra	9th	
2015	Tier 3	Division 1	Norra	5th	
2016	Tier 3	Division 1	Norra	8th	
2017	Tier 3	Division 1	Norra	5th	
2018	Tier 3	Division 1	Norra	5th	
2019	Tier 3	Division 1	Norra	2nd	Promoted
2020	Tier 2	Superettan		15th	Relegated
2021	Tier 3	Ettan	Norra	8th	
2022	Tier 3	Ettan	Norra	12th	
2023	Tier 3	Ettan	Norra	10th	
2024	Tier 3	Ettan	Norra	1st	Promoted
2025	Tier 2	Superettan		16th	Relegated

* League restructuring in 2006 resulted in a new division being created at Tier 3 and subsequent divisions dropping a level.

== Players ==
=== Current squad ===
As of 5 September, 2026

Note: Flags indicate national team as defined under FIFA eligibility rules; some limited exceptions apply. Players may hold more than one non-FIFA nationality.

No.	Pos.	Nation	Player
1	GK	SWE	Pontus Eriksson
2	DF	SWE	Neo Lindén
3	DF	SWE	Rasmus Andersson
5	DF	SWE	Niclas Håkansson
6	MF	SWE	Stefan Lindmark
7	MF	SWE	Adam Sandström
8	MF	NGR	Fredrick Godwin
9	FW	SWE	Robin Hadad
10	FW	GHA	Phillip Appiah
12	MF	GHA	Emmanuel Yeboah
14	MF	SWE	Elias Cederblad
15	MF	SWE	Simon Wagnsson
16	FW	NGR	Zishim Bawa
17	MF	SWE	Sam Forsman

No.	Pos.	Nation	Player
18	FW	SWE	Erman Hrastovina (on loan from Örebro SK)
19	MF	SWE	Al-Hussein Shakir (on loan from Östers)
20	DF	SWE	Hassan Abdi Hassan
22	MF	SWE	Tintin Lindgren
23	MF	SWE	Isak Johansson
24	DF	SWE	Vilmer Johansson
25	FW	GAM	Musa Njie (on loan from Östers)
26	MF	SWE	David Ekman
27	MF	SWE	Felix Rhodin
28	DF	SWE	Daniel Persson
30	GK	SWE	Linus Remahl
33	DF	FRA	Jerry Mambingo
35	GK	SWE	Lukas Pihlblad (on loan from Östers)

=== Out on loan ===
Note: Flags indicate national team as defined under FIFA eligibility rules; some limited exceptions apply. Players may hold more than one non-FIFA nationality.

No.	Pos.	Nation	Player

=== Notable players ===
- (Uganda) Alexis Bbakka
- (Nigeria) Gbenga Arokoyo
- (Sweden) Adam Chennoufi
- (Japan) Soya Takahashi
- (Finland) Björn-Erik Sundqvist
- (Norway) Karl Morten Eek
- (Sweden) Andrée Jeglertz
- (Sweden) Dan Burlin
- (Sweden) Andreas Dahlén
- (Liberia) Anthony Allison
- (Croatia) Frane Lojić
- (Australia) Daniel Severino
- (Sweden) Nicklas Maripuu
- (Haiti) Andrew Jean-Baptiste
- (Sweden) David Myrestam
- (Sierra Leone) Mohamed Kamanor
- (Sweden) Seif Kadhim
- (Montenegro) Suad Gruda
- (Sweden) Andreas Hermansson
- (Ghana) Abdul Mumuni
- (Norway) Per Joar Hansen
- (Sweden) Jesper Blomqvist
- (Sweden) Tommy Lycén
- (Kenya) Robert Mambo Mumba
- (Sweden) Jonas Wallerstedt
- (Ghana) Shamo Quaye
- (Sweden) Mikael Dahlberg
- (England) Ryan Gilligan
- (Sweden) Mikael Lustig
- (Sierra Leone) Francis Koroma
- (England) Brian Wake
- (Ukraine) Andriy Fedorenko
- (Poland) Leszek Iwanicki
- (Bosnia and Herzegovina) Samir Šarić
- (England) Steve Galloway
- (Belarus) Pilip Vaitsiakhovich
- (England) Dean Holness
- (Ukraine) Ivan Trubochkin
- (Sweden) Roger Sandberg
- (Sierra Leone) Ibrahim Kallay
- (United States) Victor Mansaray
- (Canada) Yann-Alexandre Fillion
- (Canada) Zachary Sukunda
- (Sweden) Tim Markström
- (Sweden) Leo Englund
- (Georgia (country)) Zaur Svanadze
- (Sweden) Petter Augustsson
- (Netherlands) Omar el Baad

== Attendances ==
In recent seasons Umeå FC have had the following average attendances:

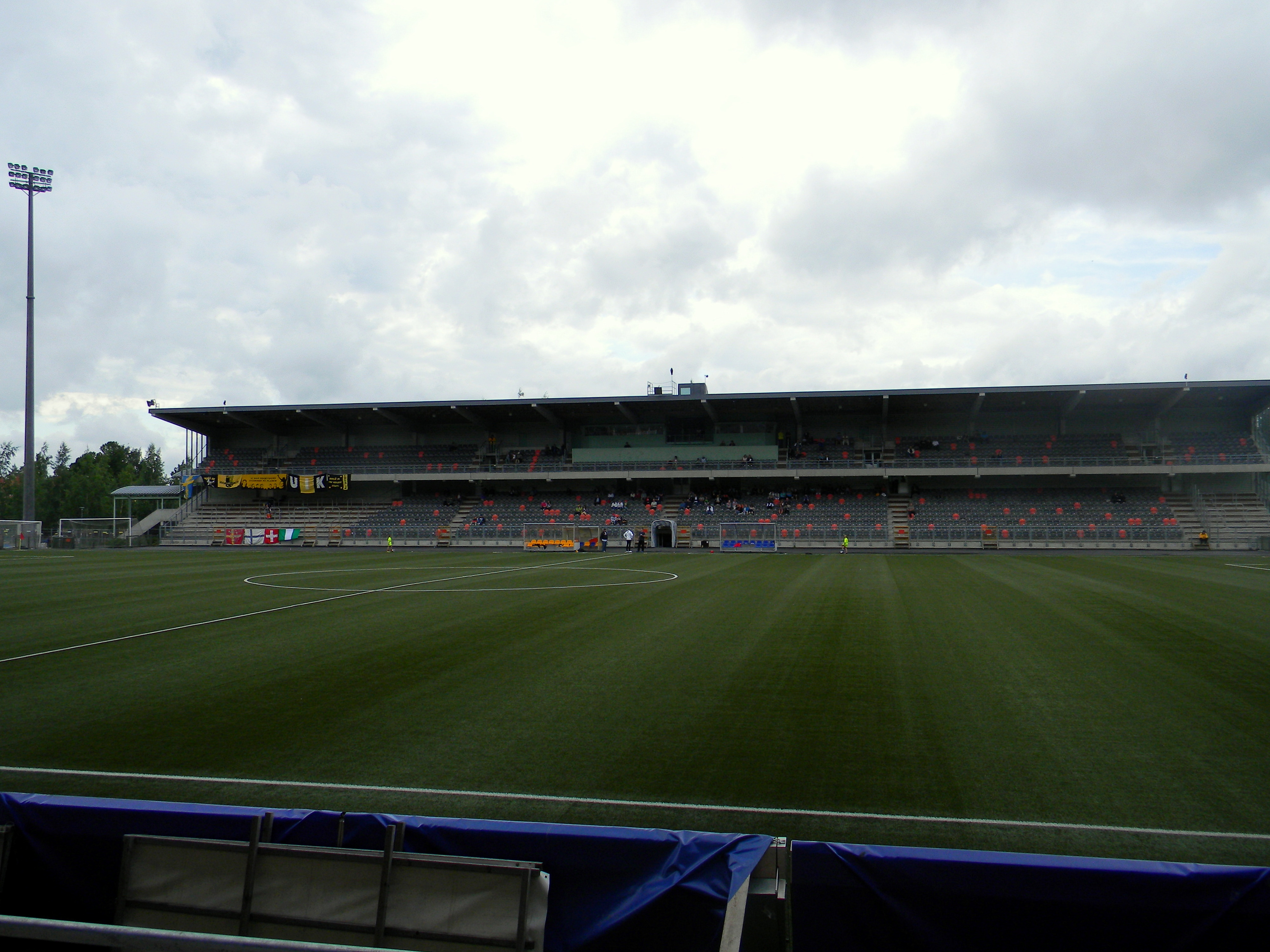
T3 Arena

Season	Average attendance	Division / Section	Level
2005	860	Div 2 Norrland	Tier 3
2006	1,259	Superettan	Tier 2
2007	438	Div 1 Norra	Tier 3
2008	545	Div 1 Norra	Tier 3
2009	660	Div 1 Norra	Tier 3
2010	880	Div 1 Norra	Tier 3
2011	1,777	Div 1 Norra	Tier 3
2012	2,046	Superettan	Tier 2
2013	622	Div 1 Norra	Tier 3
2014	660	Div 1 Norra	Tier 3
2015	777	Div 1 Norra	Tier 3
2016	589	Div 1 Norra	Tier 3
2017	711	Div 1 Norra	Tier 3
2018	485	Div 1 Norra	Tier 3
2019	588	Div 1 Norra	Tier 3
2020		Superettan	Tier 2

* Attendances are provided in the Publikliga sections of the Svenska Fotbollförbundet website.

== Achievements ==
- Division 1 Norra
  - Winners (1): 1995, 2011, 2024
  - Runners-up (2): 1994, 1998
