= 2010 Djurgårdens IF season =

Djurgården
2010 season
- Chairman: Tommy Jacobson
- Manager: Lennart Wass & Carlos Banda
- Stadium: Stockholms Stadion
- Allsvenskan: 10th
- Svenska Cupen: 3rd round
- Top goalscorer: League: Kennedy Igboananike (9); All: Kennedy Igboananike (9)
- Highest home attendance: 18,511 (3 October vs AIK, Allsvenskan)
- Lowest home attendance: 5,263 (29 April vs Mjällby AIF, Allsvenskan)
Home colours	Away colours

Djurgården will in the 2010 season compete in the Allsvenskan and Svenska Cupen. Tommy Jacobson was selected as new chairman and Lennart Wass became new manager and would work together with the manager from 2009, Andreé Jeglertz, but Jeglertz chose to left the club. Carlos Banda was contracted to work with Wass.

== Squad ==
- According to dif.se
- updated October 5, 2010

N	Pos.	Nat.	Name	Age	EU	Since	App	Goals	Ends	Transfer fee	Notes
2	CB	(Finland)	Toivio	38	EU	2010	24	1	2013	Undisclosed	
3	LB	(Benin)	Ayuba	35	EU	2009	17	1	2012	Undisclosed	
4	CB	(Sweden)	Haginge	41	EU	2008	50	3	2011	Undisclosed	
5	LB	(Sweden)	Gustafsson (VC)	41	EU	2009	43	0	2011	Undisclosed	
6	CB	(Finland)	Lyyski (VC)	43	EU	2010	16	0	2012	Undisclosed	
7	CF	(Nigeria)	Igboananike	37	EU	2010	24	6	2012		
8	CM	(Nigeria)	Ekong	48	Non-EU	2008	58	3	2012	Undisclosed	
9	CF	(Sweden)	Oremo	40	EU	2008	56	7	2012	10M SEK	Injured
10	LW	(Sweden)	Youssef	38	EU	2009	44	5	2011	Undisclosed	
11	CM	(Finland)	Sjölund	43	EU	2003	182	33	2012	Undisclosed	
12	CF	(Sweden)	Jonson	52	EU	2005	92	23	2011	Undisclosed	
14	RB	(The Gambia)	Ceesay	38	EU	2007	74	1	2012	Undisclosed	
15	GK	(The Gambia)	Touray (C)	46	EU	2000	198	1	2011	Undisclosed	
16	CM	(Finland)	Kasper	40	EU	2010	25	2	2013	Undisclosed	
17	RW	(Sweden)	Touma	47	EU	2010	60	13	2010	Undisclosed	
19	LW	(Croatia)	Milić	37	Non-EU	2009	41	4	2013	Undisclosed	Suspended by club
20	CM	(Sweden)	Andersson	44	EU	2008	19	0	2010	Undisclosed	Injured
21	CM	(Finland)	Perovuo	41	EU	2010	21	1	2012	Undisclosed	
22	SS	(Sweden)	Hellquist	35	EU	2008	47	5	2012	Youth system	
23	CF	(Sweden)	Simba	36	EU	2010	0	0		Youth system	Talent squad
25	RW	(Sweden)	Rajalakso	38	EU	2008	74	11	2011	Undisclosed	
26	CB	(Sweden)	Calisir	36	EU	2010	4	0		Youth system	Talent squad
28	CM	(Sweden)	Makolli	34	EU	2009	4	0		Youth system	
29	LB	(Serbia)	Kuzmanović	34	Non-EU	2010	1	0	2013	Undisclosed	Talent squad
30	GK	(Sweden)	Matwiejew	34	EU	2010	0	0		Youth system	Talent squad
33	LB	(Argentina)	Lucho R	41	Non-EU	2010	6	0	2010		
35	GK	(Sweden)	Vaiho	38	EU	2005	9	0	2011	Youth system	

== Transfers ==
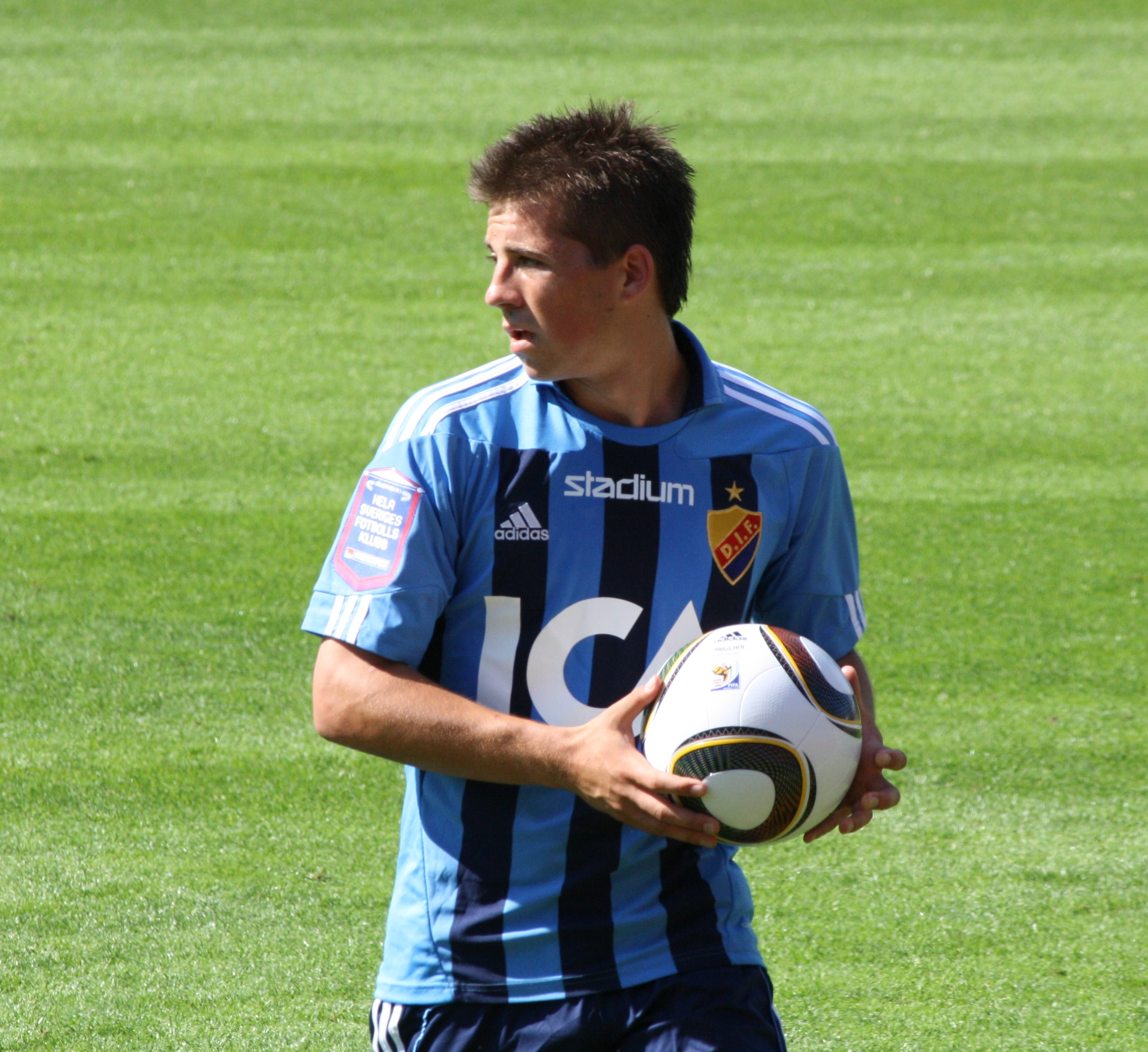
Danilo Kuzmanović

=== Players in ===
No.	Pos.	Nat.	Name	Age	EU	Moving from	Type	Transfer window	Ends	Transfer fee	Source
35	GK	(Sweden)	Vaiho	38	EU	Vasalunds IF	Loan return	Winter	2011		[]
20	MF	(Sweden)	Andersson	44	EU	Vasalunds IF	Loan return	Winter	2010		[]
6	DF	(Finland)	Lyyski	43	EU	VPS (Finland)	Transfer	Winter	2012	Free	DIF.se
7	FW	(Nigeria)	Kennedy	37	EU	Vasalunds IF	Transfer	Winter	2012		DIF.se
16	MF	(Finland)	Hämäläinen	40	EU	TPS (Finland)	Transfer	Winter	2013	Undisclosed	DIF.se
21	MF	(Finland)	Perovuo	41	EU	FC Honka (Finland)	Transfer	Winter	2012		DIF.se
2	DF	(Finland)	Toivio	38	EU	AZ (Netherlands)	Transfer	Winter	2013		DIF.se
29	DF	(Serbia)	Kuzmanović	34	Non-EU	Rad (Serbia)	Transfer	Winter	2013		DIF.se
17	MF	(Sweden)	Touma	47	EU	Iraklis (Greece)	Transfer	Winter	2010		DIF.se
	DF	(Sweden)	Jarl	34	EU	Enköpings SK	Transfer	Summer	2013		DIF.se
	DF	(Argentina)	Lucho Rodríguez	41	Non-EU	Sheriff Tiraspol (Moldova)	Transfer	Summer	2010		DIF.se

=== Players out ===
No.	Pos.	Nat.	Name	Age	EU	Moving to	Type	Transfer window	Transfer fee	Source
16	DF	(Sweden)	Johannesson	51	EU		Retired	Winter		DIFTV
6	DF	(Finland)	Kuivasto	50	EU	Haka (Finland)	Contract ended	Winter		DIF.se
30	GK	(Sweden)	Wahlström	50	EU		Retired	Winter		DIF.se
18	FW	(Sweden)	Dahlberg	41	EU	Gefle IF	Contract ended	Winter		DIF.se
8	DF	(Germany)	Tauer	43	EU	VfL Osnabrück (Germany)	Contract ended	Winter		DIF.se
27	MF	(Sweden)	Burlin	46	EU	Skellefteå FF	Loan ended	Winter		DIF.se
23	MF	(Argentina)	Ortiz	36	Non-EU	River Plate (Argentina)	Loan ended	Winter		DIF.se
24	MF	(Sweden)	Magnusson	42	EU	HJK Helsinki (Finland)	Released	Winter	Free	DIF.se
17	FW	(Zambia)	Mwila	42	EU	FC Trollhättan	Loan	Winter		DIF.se
27	DF	(Sweden)	Outinen	34	EU	IK Sirius	Transfer	Summer		DIF.se

=== Squad stats ===
Last updated on 7 November 2010.

No.	Pos	Nat	Player	Total		Allsvenskan		Svenska Cupen	
No.	Pos	Nat	Player	Apps	Goals	Apps	Goals	Apps	Goals
2	DF	(Finland) FIN	Joona Toivio	30	1	29	1	1	0
3	DF	(Benin) BEN	Yosif Ayuba	5	0	4	0	1	0
4	DF	(Sweden) SWE	Patrik Haginge	13	0	12	0	1	0
5	DF	(Sweden) SWE	Petter Gustafsson	17	1	17	1	0	0
6	DF	(Finland) FIN	Jani Lyyski	20	0	20	0	0	0
7	FW	(Nigeria) NGR	Kennedy Igboananike	28	9	27	9	1	0
8	MF	(Nigeria) NGR	Prince Ikpe Ekong	23	2	22	2	1	0
9	FW	(Sweden) SWE	Johan Oremo	23	3	23	3	0	0
10	MF	(Sweden) SWE	Christer Youssef	21	3	21	3	0	0
11	MF	(Finland) FIN	Daniel Sjölund	14	0	14	0	0	0
12	FW	(Sweden) SWE	Mattias Jonson	14	2	14	2	0	0
14	DF	(The Gambia) GAM	Kebba Ceesay	28	0	27	0	1	0
15	GK	(The Gambia) GAM	Pa Dembo Touray	23	0	23	0	0	0
16	MF	(Finland) FIN	Kasper Hämäläinen	31	2	30	2	1	0
17	MF	(Sweden) SWE	Sharbel Touma	26	5	26	5	0	0
19	MF	(Croatia) CRO	Hrvoje Milić	11	0	10	0	1	0
20	MF	(Sweden) SWE	Martin Andersson	0	0	0	0	0	0
21	MF	(Finland) FIN	Joel Perovuo	24	1	23	1	1	0
22	MF	(Sweden) SWE	Philip Hellquist	25	3	24	3	1	0
23	FW	(Sweden) SWE	Charles Simba	0	0	0	0	0	0
25	MF	(Sweden) SWE	Sebastian Rajalakso	21	1	20	1	1	0
26	DF	(Sweden) SWE	André Calisir	7	0	6	0	1	0
27	DF	(Sweden) SWE	Adam Outinen	0	0	0	0	0	0
28	MF	(Sweden) SWE	Trimi Makolli	1	0	0	0	1	0
29	DF	(Serbia) SRB	Danilo Kuzmanović	1	0	1	0	0	0
30	GK	(Sweden) SWE	Christoffer Matwiejew	0	0	0	0	0	0
33	DF	(Argentina) ARG	Lucho Rodríguez	11	0	11	0	0	0
34	MF	(Sweden) SWE	Joakim Alriksson	1	0	1	0	0	0
35	GK	(Sweden) SWE	Tommi Vaiho	10	0	9	0	1	0

== Club ==
=== Coaching staff ===
Position	Staff
Head Coach First Team	(Sweden) Lennart Wass
Head Coach First Team	(Sweden) (Chile) Carlos Banda
Individual Coach First Team	(Sweden) Martin Sundgren
Goalkeeping Coach	(Sweden) Kjell Frisk
Fitness Coach	(Iceland) Palmar Hreinsson
Physiotherapist	(Sweden) Stefan Tanda

Last updated: 13 March
Source: Djurgården

=== Kit ===
Supplier: Adidas
Sponsor(s): ICA

Home 2009	Away 2009

=== Other information ===
Chairman	(Sweden) Tommy Jacobson
Sport director	(Sweden) Stefan Alvén
Ground (capacity and dimensions)	Stockholm Stadion (14 417 / 105x70 m)

Updated to match played 25 January
Source: Djurgårdens IF and Stockholms Stadion

== Matches ==
=== Pre-season ===
==== Top scorers pre-season ====
Name	Goals
(Sweden) Christer Youssef	5
(Sweden) Mattias Jonson	4
(Nigeria) Kennedy Igboananike	1
(Sweden) Petter Gustafsson	1
(Benin) Yosif Ayuba	1
(Finland) Daniel Sjölund	1
(Sweden) André Calisir	1
(Sweden) Philip Hellquist	1
(Finland) Kasper Hämäläinen	1

31 January 2010	Djurgården	6 – 0	Degerfors	Bosön Multihall, Bosön
14:30	Jonson 19', 53', 54'; Gustafsson 24'; Igboananike 36'; Ayuba 79'	Report		Attendance: Closed for spectators

7 February 2010	Djurgården	1 – 1	GIF Sundsvall	Skytteholms IP, Solna
15:00	Sjölund 54'	Report	48' Sliper	Attendance: 2,163

14 February 2010	Djurgården	3 – 2	Gefle	Skytteholms IP, Solna
15:00	Youssef 14', 86'; Jonson 23' (pen.)	Report	30' Lantto; 72' Berg	Attendance: 1,248

19 February 2010	Brommapojkarna	2 – 0	Djurgården	Bosön Multihall, Bosön
16:00	Eriksson 61'; Runnemo 85'	Report		Attendance: Closed for spectators

28 February 2010	Alania (Russia)	0 – 2	Djurgården	Atelia Shine Sportcenter, Turkey
15:00		Report	27' Youssef; 70' Hellquist

2 March 2010	Belshina Bobruisk (Belarus)	1 – 1	Djurgården	Atelia Shine Sportcenter, Turkey
15:30	Sukharev 86'	Report	70' Calisir

7 March 2010	Vasalund	2 – 3	Djurgården	Skytteholms IP, Solna
13:15	Tedla 55'; Jonson 81'	Report	Youssef 19', 25'; Hämäläinen 27'	Attendance: 1,100

=== Summer friendlies ===
Friendly games because of Allsvenskan time-out during 2010 FIFA World Cup.

==== Top scorers summer ====
Name	Goals
(Sweden) Christer Youssef	2
(Sweden) Philip Hellquist	2
(Sweden) Johan Oremo	1
(Nigeria) Kennedy Igboananike	1
(Sweden) Sharbel Touma	1
(The Gambia) Kebba Ceesay	1

19 June 2010	Bergkvara AIF	0 – 3	Djurgården	Hagaborgs IP, Bergkvara
13:00		Report	40' Youssef; 67', 82' Hellquist	Attendance: ~850

2 July 2010	Djurgården	3 – 0	(Russia) Spartak Moscow	Stockholms Stadion, Stockholm
14:00	Oremo 35'; Igboananike 46'; Touma 57'	Report		Attendance: 1,632; Referee: Stefan Johannesson

10 July 2010	Brøndby (Denmark)	4 – 1	Djurgården	(Denmark) Brøndby Stadion, Copenhagen
16:00	Jallow 35'; Krohn-Dehli 50'; Batata 81'; Bernburg 88'	Report	34' Youssef	Attendance: 2,402

12 July 2010	Djurgården	1 – 2	(Spain) Mallorca	Tunavallen, Eskilstuna
20:00	Ceesay 88'	Report	48' Víctor; 58' Chori Castro

=== Allsvenskan ===
==== Results summary ====
Overall								Home						Away					
Pld	W	D	L	GF	GA	GD	Pts	W	D	L	GF	GA	GD	W	D	L	GF	GA	GD
30	11	7	12	35	42	−7	40	7	4	4	19	17	+2	4	3	8	16	25	−9

Last updated: November 2010.
Source: svenskfotboll.se (in Swedish)

==== Results by round ====
Round	1	2	3	4	5	6	7	8	9	10	11	12	13	14	15	16	17	18	19	20	21	22	23	24	25	26	27	28	29	30
Ground	A	H	H	A	H	A	H	A	H	A	H	A	A	H	H	A	H	A	A	H	A	H	A	H	A	H	A	H	A	H
Result	L	L	D	D	W	L	W	L	W	W	D	L	L	D	L	W	L	D	W	W	W	W	L	W	L	W	L	D	D	L
Position	14	15	15	14	10	12	12	12	10	7	7	7	10	10	11	9	11	12	10	6	6	5	6	5	7	5	8	8	7	10

Updated to match(es) played on 15 November. Source: Matches
A = Away; H = Home; W = Win; D = Draw; L = Loss

==== Standings ====
Pos	Team	Pld	W	D	L	GF	GA	GD	Pts	Qualification or relegation
8	BK Häcken	30	11	7	12	40	42	−2	40	Qualification to Europa League first qualifying round (Note: Sweden was among the best three associations in the UEFA Fair Play ranking and thus received an additional spot in the first qualifying round of the Europa League, Häcken received the qualifying spot for their ranking in Allsvenskans Fair Play ranking.)
9	Kalmar FF	30	10	10	10	36	38	−2	40	
10	Djurgårdens IF	30	11	7	12	35	42	−7	40	
11	AIK	30	10	5	15	29	36	−7	35	
12	Halmstads BK	30	10	5	15	31	42	−11	35	

Source: svenskfotboll.se (in Swedish)
Rules for classification: 1) points; 2) goal difference; 3) number of goals scored.

==== Top scorers Allsvenskan ====
Name	Goals
(Nigeria) Kennedy Igboananike	9
(Sweden) Sharbel Touma	5
(Sweden) Johan Oremo	3
(Sweden) Philip Hellquist	3
(Sweden) Christer Youssef	3
(Finland) Kasper Hämäläinen	2
(Sweden) Mattias Jonson	2
(Nigeria) Prince Ikpe Ekong	2
(Sweden) Sebastian Rajalakso	1
(Sweden) Petter Gustafsson	1
(Finland) Joel Perovuo	1
(Finland) Joona Toivio	1
own goals	2

14 March 2010 Matchday 1	Häcken	2 – 1	Djurgården	Borås Arena, Borås (HR)
14:00	Paulinho 21'; Östberg 62'	(Report)	55' Igboananike	Attendance: 2,412; Referee: Martin Ingvarsson

21 March 2010 Matchday 2	Djurgården	0 – 1	Helsingborg	Stockholms Stadion, Stockholm
15:00	Jönsson 2'	(Report)		Attendance: 0 Referee: Martin Hansson

31 March 2010 Matchday 3	Djurgården	0 – 0	Brommapojkarna	Stockholms Stadion, Stockholm
19:00		(Report)		Attendance: 7,190; Referee: Michael Lerjéus

6 April 2010 Matchday 4	IFK Göteborg	1 – 1	Djurgården	Gamla Ullevi, Gothenburg
19:00	Johansson 56'	(Report)	16' Hellquist	Attendance: 10,384; Referee: Markus Strömbergsson

12 April 2010 Matchday 5	Djurgården	3 – 0	Trelleborgs FF	Stockholms Stadion, Stockholm
19:00	37' Oremo; 62' Ekong; 81' Touma	(Report)		Attendance: 5,375; Referee: Tobias Mattsson

15 April 2010 Matchday 6	Elfsborg	3 – 1	Djurgården	Borås Arena, Borås
19:00	16', 36' Avdić; 55' Ericsson	Report	3' (pen.) Oremo	Attendance: 6,851; Referee: Martin Ingvarsson

20 April 2010 Matchday 7	Djurgården	2 – 1	Åtvidaberg	Stockholms Stadion, Stockholm
19:00	45' (o.g.) da Silva; 61' (o.g.) Karlsson	Report	35' Radetinac	Attendance: 5,403; Referee: Jonas Eriksson

26 April 2010 Matchday 8	Malmö FF	2 – 1	Djurgården	Swedbank Stadion, Malmö
19:00	11', 63' Larsson	Report	86' Hämäläinen	Attendance: 13,028; Referee: Michael Lerjéus

29 April 2010 Matchday 9	Djurgården	1 – 0	Mjällby	Stockholms Stadion, Stockholm
19:00	84' Igboananike	Report		Attendance: 5,263; Referee: Magnus Ahlsén

2 May 2010 Matchday 10	AIK	1 – 2	Djurgården	Råsunda Stadium, Solna
12:30	2' (o.g.) Toivio	Report	38' Perovuo; 72' Oremo	Attendance: 21,181; Referee: Stefan Johannesson

6 May 2010 Matchday 11	Djurgården	1 – 1	GAIS	Stockholms Stadion, Stockholm
19:00	15' Hämäläinen	Report	48' Wanderson	Attendance: 6,905; Referee: Tobias Mattsson

9 May 2010 Matchday 12	Örebro	1 – 0	Djurgården	Behrn Arena, Örebro
14:30	49' (o.g.) Ceesay	Report		Attendance: 8,656; Referee: Sven-Martin Åkesson

15 May 2010 Matchday 13	Halmstad	2 – 0	Djurgården	Örjans Vall, Halmstad
16:00	11', 88' Anselmo	Report		Attendance: 4,147; Referee: Markus Strömbergsson

22 May 2010 Matchday 14	Djurgården	1 – 1	Gefle	Stockholms Stadion, Stockholm
16:00	79' Youssef	Report	90+1' Orlov	Attendance: 9,282; Referee: Stefan Johannesson

18 July 2010 Matchday 15	Djurgården	0 – 2	Kalmar FF	Stockholms Stadion, Stockholm
18:00		Report	6' Dauda; 74' D. Mendes	Attendance: 8,112; Referee: Stefan Johannesson

25 July 2010 Matchday 16	Kalmar FF	0 – 1	Djurgården	Fredriksskans, Kalmar
18:00		Report	79' Hellquist	Attendance: 5,769; Referee: Tobias Matsson

31 July 2010 Matchday 17	Djurgården	0 – 3	Häcken	Stockholms Stadion, Stockholm
16:00		Report	63' Henriksson; 81' Ranégie; 90' Paulinho	Attendance: 6,162; Referee: Johan Hamlin

5 August 2010 Matchday 18	Helsingborg	3 – 3	Djurgården	Olympia, Helsingborg
19:00	54', 57', 90+3' Gerndt	Report	42' Igboananike; 65' Jonson; 70' Touma	Attendance: 15,407; Referee: Martin Hansson

18 August 2010 Matchday 19	Brommapojkarna	0 – 1	Djurgården	Grimsta IP, Bromma, Stockholm
19:00		Report	85' Rajalakso	Attendance: 5,053; Referee: Daniel Stålhammar

22 August 2010 Matchday 20	Djurgården	2 – 0	IFK Göteborg	Råsunda Stadium, Solna***
16:30	33' Hellquist; 88' Igboananike	Report		Attendance: 9,304; Referee: Michael Lerjéus

27 August 2010 Matchday 21	GAIS	0 – 1	Djurgården	Gamla Ullevi, Gothenburg
19:00		Report	43' Touma	Attendance: 3,768; Referee: Martin Strömbergsson

12 September 2010 Matchday 22	Djurgården	2 – 1	Örebro	Stockholms Stadion, Stockholm
16:30	79' Touma; 82' Toivio	Report	35' Wikström	Attendance: 8,057; Referee: Jonas Eriksson

15 September 2010 Matchday 23	Åtvidaberg	2 – 1	Djurgården	Kopparvallen, Åtvidaberg
19:00	52' Roberts; 82' Möler	Report	90+3' Jonson	Attendance: 4,505; Referee: Daniel Stålhammar

20 September 2010 Matchday 24	Djurgården	1 – 0	Malmö FF	Stockholms Stadion, Stockholm
19:00	23' Igboananike	Report		Attendance: 7,699; Referee: Michael Lerjéus

27 September 2010 Matchday 25	Mjällby	3 – 0	Djurgården	Strandvallen, Hällevik
19:00	20' El Kabir; 73', 90+1' Gitselov	Report	(red card) 66' Ekong	Attendance: 3,528; Referee: Jim Petersson

3 October 2010 Matchday 26	Djurgården	2 – 1	AIK	Råsunda Stadium, Solna (HR)
16:30	42' Igboananike; 47' Touma	Report	9' (pen.) Pavey	Attendance: 18,511; Referee: Stefan Johannesson

17 October 2010 Matchday 27	Trelleborg	3 – 1	Djurgården	Vångavallen, Trelleborg
15:00	18', 64' Jensen; 61' Pode	Report	84' Youssef	Attendance: 2,195; Referee: Martin Strömbergsson

24 October 2010 Matchday 28	Djurgården	4 – 4	Elfsborg	Stockholms Stadion, Stockholm
16:30	13' Ekong; 60', 90+3' Igboananike; 72' Gustafsson	Report	30' (o.g.) Ekong; 49' Ishizaki; 62' Jawo; 74' Avdić	Attendance: 5,397; Referee: Markus Strömbergsson

31 October 2010 Matchday 29	Gefle	2 – 2	Djurgården	Strömvallen, Gävle
15:00	54' Orlov; 90' Own goal	Report	8' Youssef; 74' Igboananike	Attendance: 5,093; Referee: Stefan Johannesson

7 November 2010 Matchday 30	Djurgården	0 – 2	Halmstad	Stockholms Stadion, Stockholm
16:30		Report	42' Görlitz; 66' Sise	Attendance: 5,017; Referee: Martin Strömbergsson

* Häcken will use Borås Arena as stadium for the season premiere because of weather conditions.

** Will be played without any supporters at the stadium, because of some incidents during the match against Assyriska in last years relegation match for Allsvenskan.

*** Played at Råsunda.

=== Svenska Cupen ===
18 May 2010	Ljungskile	2 – 0	Djurgården	Starke Arvid Arena, Ljungskile
19.00	45' Altemark-Vanneryr; 74' Friberg da Cruz	Report		Attendance: 666; Referee: Antti Kanerva
