= 2011 Djurgårdens IF season =

Djurgården
2011 season
- Chairman: Tommy Jacobson
- Manager: Magnus Pehrsson
- Stadium: Stockholms Stadion
- Allsvenskan: 11th
- Svenska Cupen: 4th round
- Top goalscorer: League: Kennedy Igboananike & Joona Toivio (6); All: Kennedy Igboananike (7)
- Highest home attendance: 28,931 (vs AIK)
| Home colours | Away colours |

In the 2011 season, Djurgårdens IF competes in the Allsvenskan and Svenska Cupen. Lennart Wass and Carlos Banda were contracted as coaches.

On 3 May, after only taking 1 out of 18 points, Djurgården sacked Lennart Wass and contracted Magnus Pehrsson as manager. Banda is still left and co-manages the team with Pehrsson.

Sports director Stefan Alvén chose to leave the club on 4 May after responding to threats from angry supporters on him and his family.

== Squad ==
- According to dif.se
- updated 25 October 2010

| N | Pos. | Nat. | Name | Age | EU | Since | App | Goals | Ends | Transfer fee | Notes |
|---|---|---|---|---|---|---|---|---|---|---|---|
| 2 | CB | (Finland) | Joona Toivio | 38 | EU | 2010 | 60 | 7 | 2013 | Undisclosed | |
| 3 | LB | (Benin) | Yosif Ayuba | 35 | EU | 2009 | 17 | 1 | 2012 | Undisclosed | Second nationality: Sweden |
| 5 | LB | (Sweden) | Petter Gustafsson | 41 | EU | 2009 | 73 | 2 | 2013 | Undisclosed | |
| 6 | CB | (Finland) | Jani Lyyski | 43 | EU | 2010 | 41 | 0 | 2012 | Undisclosed | |
| 7 | CF | (Nigeria) | Kennedy Igboananike | 37 | Non-EU | 2010 | 61 | 16 | 2012 | | |
| 8 | CM | (Nigeria) | Prince Ikpe Ekong | 47 | Non-EU | 2008 | 61 | 4 | 2012 | Undisclosed | |
| 9 | CF | (Sweden) | Johan Oremo | 39 | EU | 2008 | 65 | 8 | 2012 | £1.06M | |
| 10 | LW | (Sweden) | Christer Youssef | 38 | EU | 2009 | 73 | 10 | 2011 | Free | Second nationality: Syria |
| 11 | CM | (Finland) | Daniel Sjölund | 43 | EU | 2003 | 217 | 36 | 2012 | £0.44M | |
| 12 | CF | (Sweden) | Mattias Jonson | 52 | EU | 2005 | 119 | 25 | 2011 | Undisclosed | |
| 14 | RB | (The Gambia) | Kebba Ceesay | 38 | EU | 2007 | 104 | 1 | 2012 | Undisclosed | Second nationality: Sweden |
| 15 | GK | (The Gambia) | Pa Dembo Touray | 46 | EU | 2000 | 204 | 1 | 2011 | £0.2M | Second nationality: Sweden |
| 16 | CM | (Finland) | Kasper Hämäläinen | 40 | EU | 2010 | 63 | 4 | 2013 | £0.26M | |
| 17 | DF | (Sweden) | Joel Riddez (C) | 46 | EU | 2011 | 56 | 0 | 2013 | Free | |
| 18 | MF | (Burkina Faso) | Adama Guira | 38 | Non-EU | 2011 | 6 | 0 | 2011 | Free | |
| 19 | MF | (Denmark) | Peter Nymann | 44 | EU | 2011 | 12 | 1 | 2013 | Free | |
| 21 | FW | (Denmark) | Nicolaj Agger | 37 | EU | 2011 | 7 | 1 | 2011 | Loan | |
| 22 | SS | (Sweden) | Philip Hellquist | 35 | EU | 2008 | 78 | 9 | 2012 | Youth system | |
| 25 | LW | (Sweden) | Sebastian Rajalakso | 37 | EU | 2008 | 110 | 16 | 2011 | Undisclosed | |
| 35 | GK | (Sweden) | Tommi Vaiho | 37 | EU | 2005 | 15 | 0 | 2011 | Youth system | Second nationality: Finland |

=== U21 squad ===
Note: Flags indicate national team as defined under FIFA eligibility rules; some limited exceptions apply. Players may hold more than one non-FIFA nationality.

| No. | Pos. | Nation | Player |
|---|---|---|---|
| 20 | GK | LBN | Mehdi Khalil |
| 24 | DF | SWE | Daniel Jarl |
| 28 | MF | SWE | Trimi Makolli |
| 29 | DF | SRB | Danilo Kuzmanović |
| 30 | GK | SWE | Christoffer Matwiejew |

| No. | Pos. | Nation | Player |
|---|---|---|---|
| 31 | DF | SWE | Rtawi Mecconen |
| 32 | FW | SWE | Carl Björk |
| 33 | DF | SWE | Emil Bergström |
| 34 | MF | SWE | Joakim Alriksson |
| 36 | DF | SWE | Philip Sparrdal Mantilla |

== Transfers ==
=== Players in ===
| No. | Pos. | Nat. | Name | Age | EU | Moving from | Type | Transfer window | Ends | Transfer fee | Source |
|---|---|---|---|---|---|---|---|---|---|---|---|
| 17 | DF | (Sweden) | Joel Riddez | 31 | EU | Strømsgodset (Norway) | Free Transfer | Winter | 2014 | free | [] |
| | FW | (Zambia) | Boyd Mwila | 27 | EU | FC Trollhättan | Loan return | Winter | 2012 | | [] |
| 4 | DF | (United States) | Gale Agbossoumonde | 19 | | Fort Lauderdale Strikers (United States) | Loan | Winter | 2011 | | DIFTV |
| | MF | (Burkina Faso) | Adama Guira | 23 | | UD Logroñés (Spain) | Transfer | Summer | | Free | DIF.se |
| | MF | (Denmark) | Peter Nymann | 29 | EU | Esbjerg fB (Denmark) | Transfer | Summer | 2013 | Free | DIF.se |
| | MF | (Sweden) | Nahir Oyal | 20 | EU | Syrianska FC | Pre-contract | Summer | 2015 | Free | DIF.se |
| | GK | (Sierra Leone) | Mehdi Khalil | 19 | | Köpings FF | Transfer | Summer | 2011 | Undisclosed | DIF.se |
| | FW | (Denmark) | Nicolaj Agger | 22 | EU | Brøndby (Denmark) | Loan | Summer | 2011 | | DIF.se |

=== Players out ===
| No. | Pos. | Nat. | Name | Age | EU | Moving to | Type | Transfer window | Transfer fee | Source |
|---|---|---|---|---|---|---|---|---|---|---|
| 17 | MF | (Sweden) | Sharbel Touma | 32 | EU | Syrianska FC | Contract ended | Winter | | DIF.se |
| 20 | MF | (Sweden) | Martin Andersson | 29 | EU | | Contract ended | Winter | | [] |
| | FW | (Zambia) | Boyd Mwila | 27 | EU | FC Trollhättan | Loan | Winter | | DIF.se |
| 33 | DF | (Argentina) | Luis Antonio Rodríguez | 26 | | | Loan ended | Winter | | DIF.se |
| 23 | FW | (Sweden) | Charles Simba | 21 | EU | | Contract ended | Winter | | DIF.se |
| 19 | MF | (Croatia) | Hrvoje Milić | 22 | | | Loan | Winter | | [] |
| 4 | DF | (Sweden) | Patrik Haginge | 26 | EU | Örebro SK | Transfer | Winter | Undisclosed | DIF.se |
| 26 | DF | (Sweden) | André Calisir | 21 | EU | Jönköpings Södra IF | Loan | Summer | | DIF.se |
| 32 | FW | (Sweden) | Carl Björk | 19 | EU | Jönköpings Södra IF | Loan | Summer | | DIF.se |
| 4 | DF | (United States) | Gale Agbossoumonde | 19 | | Fort Lauderdale Strikers (United States) | Loan ended | Summer | | DIF.se |
| 21 | MF | (Finland) | Joel Perovuo | 26 | | HJK (Finland) | Transfer | Summer | Undisclosed | DIF.se |

=== Squad stats ===
Last updated on 5 July 2011.

| No. | Pos | Nat | Player | Total | | Allsvenskan | | Svenska Cupen | |
| No. | Pos | Nat | Player | Apps | Goals | Apps | Goals | Apps | Goals |
|---|---|---|---|---|---|---|---|---|---|
| 2 | DF | (Finland) FIN | Joona Toivio | 30 | 6 | 28 | 6 | 2 | 0 |
| 3 | DF | (Benin) BEN | Yosif Ayuba | 0 | 0 | 0 | 0 | 0 | 0 |
| 4 | DF | (United States) USA | Gale Agbossoumonde | 10 | 0 | 8 | 0 | 2 | 0 |
| 5 | DF | (Sweden) SWE | Petter Gustafsson | 25 | 2 | 23 | 2 | 2 | 0 |
| 6 | DF | (Finland) FIN | Jani Lyyski | 21 | 0 | 21 | 0 | 0 | 0 |
| 7 | FW | (Nigeria) NGA | Kennedy Igboananike | 30 | 7 | 28 | 6 | 2 | 1 |
| 8 | MF | (Nigeria) NGA | Prince Ikpe Ekong | 0 | 0 | 0 | 0 | 0 | 0 |
| 9 | FW | (Sweden) SWE | Johan Oremo | 8 | 1 | 8 | 1 | 0 | 0 |
| 10 | MF | (Sweden) SWE | Christer Youssef | 25 | 3 | 23 | 3 | 2 | 0 |
| 11 | MF | (Finland) FIN | Daniel Sjölund | 30 | 3 | 28 | 2 | 2 | 1 |
| 12 | FW | (Sweden) SWE | Mattias Jonson | 22 | 2 | 22 | 2 | 0 | 0 |
| 14 | DF | (The Gambia) GAM | Kebba Ceesay | 26 | 0 | 25 | 0 | 1 | 0 |
| 15 | GK | (The Gambia) GAM | Pa Dembo Touray | 31 | 0 | 29 | 0 | 2 | 0 |
| 16 | MF | (Finland) FIN | Kasper Hämäläinen | 32 | 2 | 30 | 2 | 2 | 0 |
| 17 | DF | (Sweden) SWE | Joel Riddez | 19 | 0 | 17 | 0 | 2 | 0 |
| 18 | MF | (Burkina Faso) BFA | Adama Guira | 6 | 0 | 6 | 0 | 0 | 0 |
| 19 | MF | (Denmark) DEN | Peter Nymann | 12 | 1 | 12 | 1 | 0 | 0 |
| 21 | MF | (Finland) FIN | Joel Perovuo | 11 | 0 | 10 | 0 | 1 | 0 |
| 21 | MF | (Denmark) DEN | Nicolaj Agger | 7 | 1 | 7 | 1 | 0 | 0 |
| 22 | MF | (Sweden) SWE | Philip Hellquist | 28 | 4 | 26 | 4 | 2 | 0 |
| 25 | MF | (Sweden) SWE | Sebastian Rajalakso | 30 | 5 | 28 | 5 | 2 | 0 |
| 26 | DF | (Sweden) SWE | André Calisir | 1 | 0 | 1 | 0 | 0 | 0 |
| 28 | FW | (Sweden) SWE | Trimi Makolli | 1 | 0 | 1 | 0 | 0 | 0 |
| 32 | FW | (Sweden) SWE | Carl Björk | 8 | 1 | 6 | 1 | 2 | 0 |
| 33 | DF | (Sweden) SWE | Emil Bergström | 19 | 0 | 18 | 0 | 1 | 0 |
| 34 | MF | (Sweden) SWE | Joakim Alriksson | 4 | 0 | 4 | 0 | 0 | 0 |
| 35 | GK | (Sweden) SWE | Tommi Vaiho | 2 | 0 | 2 | 0 | 0 | 0 |
| 36 | DF | (Sweden) SWE | Philip Sparrdal Mantilla | 1 | 0 | 1 | 0 | 0 | 0 |

=== Disciplinary record ===
| N | Pos. | Nat. | Name | Yellow card | Second yellow card | Red card | Notes |
|---|---|---|---|---|---|---|---|
| 14 | DF | (The Gambia) | Ceesay | 6 | | | |
| 11 | MF | (Finland) | Sjölund | 6 | | | |
| 7 | FW | (Nigeria) | Igboananike | 5 | | | |
| 5 | DF | (Sweden) | Gustafsson | 4 | | | |
| 10 | MF | (Sweden) | Youssef | 4 | | | |
| 6 | DF | (Finland) | Lyyski | 3 | | | |
| 9 | FW | (Sweden) | Oremo | 2 | | | |
| 16 | MF | (Finland) | Kasper | 2 | | | |
| 22 | MF | (Sweden) | Hellquist | 2 | | | |
| 34 | MF | (Sweden) | Alriksson | 2 | | | |
| 15 | GK | (The Gambia) | Touray | 1 | | 1 | |
| 2 | DF | (Finland) | Toivio | 1 | | 1 | |
| 21 | FW | (Denmark) | Agger | 1 | 1 | | |
| 17 | DF | (Sweden) | Riddez | | 1 | | |
| 25 | MF | (Sweden) | Rajalakso | 1 | | | |
| 19 | MF | (Denmark) | Nymann | 1 | | | |
| 18 | MF | (Burkina Faso) | Guira | 1 | | | |

Last updated: 12 September 2011
Source: svenskfotboll.se
Only competitive matches
(yellow card) = Number of bookings; (second yellow card) = Number of sending offs after a second yellow card; (red card) = Number of sending offs by a direct red card.
Notes: Allsvenskan only

== Club ==
=== Coaching staff ===
| Position | Staff |
|---|---|
| Manager | (Sweden) Magnus Pehrsson |
| Head Coach First Team | (Sweden) (Chile) Carlos Banda |
| Individual Coach First Team | (Sweden) Martin Sundgren |
| Goalkeeping Coach | (Sweden) Kjell Frisk |
| Fitness Coach | (Iceland) Palmar Hreinsson |
| Physiotherapist | (Sweden) Christian Andersson |

Last updated: 13 November
Source: Djurgården

=== Other information ===
| Chairman | (Sweden) Tommy Jacobson |
| Ground (capacity and dimensions) | Stockholm Stadion (14 417 / 105x70 m) |

Updated to match played 25 January
Source: Djurgårdens IF and Stockholms Stadion

== Matches ==
=== Preseason ===
==== Top scorers Pre season ====
| Name | Goals |
|---|---|
| (Nigeria) Kennedy Igboananike | 5 |
| (Sweden) Christer Youssef | 4 |
| (Sweden) Philip Hellquist | 2 |
| (Sweden) Teferi Tedla | 1 |
| (Sweden) Joakim Alriksson | 1 |

| Name | Assists |
|---|---|
| (Sweden) Philip Hellquist | 2 |
| (Sweden) Joel Riddez | 2 |
| (Sweden) Petter Gustafsson | 1 |
| (Nigeria) Kennedy Igboananike | 1 |
| (Sweden) Sebastian Rajalakso | 1 |

| 6 February 2011 | Vasalund | 1–1 | Djurgården | Solna |
| 13:15 | 45' Johansson | Report | 10' Tedla | Stadium: Skytteholms IP; Attendance: 1,252 |

| 10 February 2011 | Djurgården | 0–0 | (Estonia) FC Flora | Seinäjoki |
| 18:30 | | Report | | Stadium: Wallsport Arena |

| 13 February 2011 | HJK Helsinki (Finland) | 2–3 | Djurgården | Seinäjoki |
| TBA | 5' Pukki; 69' Parikka | Report | 38' (pen.), 63', 70' Igboananike | Stadium: Wallsport Arena |

| 19 February 2011 | Brommapojkarna | 2–2 | Djurgården | Bosön |
| 17:00 | 12' Benyahia; 74' Bahoui | Report | 23' Youssef; 60' Hellquist | Stadium: Bosön Multihall |

| 25 February 2011 | Djurgården | 2–1 | (Belarus) FC Vitebsk | Belek |
| | 55' Youssef; 90+1' Hellquist | Report | 45' Skitaw |

| 1 March 2011 | Djurgården | 0–1 | (Russia) Terek Grozny | Belek |
| | | Report | 82' Maurício |

| 9 March 2011 | Assyriska | 1–1 | Djurgården | Södertälje |
| 15:00 | 46' Ishak | Report | 20' (pen.) Igboananike | Stadium: Södertälje Fotbollsarena |

| 15 March 2011 | Djurgården | 4–0 | (Finland) TPS Turku | Stockholm |
| TBA | 50', 70' Youssef; 62' Igboananike; 90' Alriksson | Report | | Stadium: Stadshagens IP |

| 23 March 2011 | Örebro SK | 3–0 | Djurgården | Örebro |
| TBA | 55', 70' Haddad; 85' Yasin | Report | | Stadium: Behrn Arena |

| 27 March 2011 | IFK Norrköping | 1–0 | Djurgården | Norrköping |
| TBA | 74' Ajdarević | Report |

=== Allsvenskan ===
==== Results summary ====
| Overall | | | | | | | | Home | | | | | | Away | | | | | |
| Pld | W | D | L | GF | GA | GD | Pts | W | D | L | GF | GA | GD | W | D | L | GF | GA | GD |
|---|---|---|---|---|---|---|---|---|---|---|---|---|---|---|---|---|---|---|---|
| 30 | 10 | 6 | 14 | 36 | 40 | −4 | 36 | 6 | 4 | 5 | 19 | 17 | +2 | 4 | 2 | 9 | 17 | 23 | −6 |

Last updated: October 2011.
Source: svenskfotboll.se (in Swedish)

==== Results by round ====
| Round | 1 | 2 | 3 | 4 | 5 | 6 | 7 | 8 | 9 | 10 | 11 | 12 | 13 | 14 | 15 | 16 | 17 | 18 | 19 | 20 | 21 | 22 | 23 | 24 | 25 | 26 | 27 | 28 | 29 | 30 |
|---|---|---|---|---|---|---|---|---|---|---|---|---|---|---|---|---|---|---|---|---|---|---|---|---|---|---|---|---|---|---|
| Ground | H | A | H | A | H | A | H | A | A | H | A | H | A | H | H | A | H | A | A | H | H | A | A | H | A | H | H | A | A | H |
| Result | D | L | L | L | L | L | W | D | L | L | W | W | W | W | D | L | W | L | L | D | L | L | L | W | W | W | L | D | W | D |
| Position | 9 | 11 | 12 | 13 | 16 | 16 | 15 | 14 | 15 | 15 | 15 | 14 | 13 | 11 | 11 | 11 | 10 | 11 | 12 | 12 | 13 | 13 | 14 | 13 | 12 | 11 | 12 | 12 | 12 | 11 |

Updated to match(es) played on September 2011. Source: see below
A = Away; H = Home; W = Win; D = Draw; L = Loss

==== Top scorers Allsvenskan ====
| Name | Goals |
|---|---|
| (Nigeria) Kennedy Igboananike | 6 |
| (Finland) Joona Toivio | 6 |
| (Sweden) Sebastian Rajalakso | 5 |
| (Sweden) Philip Hellquist | 4 |
| (Sweden) Christer Youssef | 3 |
| (Finland) Kasper Hämäläinen | 2 |
| (Sweden) Petter Gustafsson | 2 |
| (Sweden) Mattias Jonson | 2 |
| (Finland) Daniel Sjölund | 2 |
| (Sweden) Carl Björk | 1 |
| (Sweden) Johan Oremo | 1 |
| (Denmark) Peter Nymann | 1 |
| (Denmark) Nicolaj Agger | 1 |

| Name | Assists |
|---|---|
| (Finland) Daniel Sjölund | 8 |
| (Sweden) Sebastian Rajalakso | 3 |
| (Sweden) Mattias Jonson | 3 |
| (Nigeria) Kennedy Igboananike | 2 |
| (Sweden) Christer Youssef | 2 |
| (Sweden) Johan Oremo | 1 |
| (Sweden) Philip Hellquist | 1 |
| (Denmark) Peter Nymann | 1 |
| (Denmark) Nicolaj Agger | 1 |

| 4 April 2011 1 | Djurgården | 0–0 | AIK | Solna |
| 20:00 | | Report | | Stadium: Råsunda Stadium; Attendance: 28,931; Referee: Jonas Eriksson |

| 11 April 2011 2 | Kalmar FF | 3–2 | Djurgården | Kalmar |
| 19:00 | 29' Fagercrantz; 59' Daniel Sobralense; 83' Ricardo Santos | Report | 22' Toivio; 88' Björk | Stadium: Guldfågeln Arena; Attendance: 11,852; Referee: Markus Strömbergsson & Håkan Grahn-Gustavsson |

| 15 April 2011 3 | Djurgården | 0–1 | Malmö FF | Stockholm |
| 19:00 | (red card) 45+1' Touray | Report | 90+1' Durmaz | Stadium: Stockholms Stadion; Attendance: 9,005; Referee: Martin Hansson |

| 19 April 2011 4 | GAIS | 2–1 | Djurgården | Gothenburg |
| 19:00 | 33' (pen.) Igboananike | Report | 45' Bassombeng; 62' Celik | Stadium: Gamla Ullevi; Attendance: 5,365; Referee: Martin Ingvarsson |

| 24 April 2011 5 | Djurgården | 1–3 | IFK Norrköping | Stockholm |
| 14:00 | 63' Rajalakso | Report | 46' Wikström; 53' 66' Telo | Stadium: Stockholms Stadion; Attendance: 8,117; Referee: Johan Hamlin |

| 1 May 2011 6 | Trelleborg | 3–2 | Djurgården | Trelleborg |
| 14:00 | 47' 49' Jensen; 54' Pode | Report | 66' 87' Hellquist | Stadium: Vångavallen; Attendance: 2,395; Referee: Martin Strömbergsson |

| 7 May 2011 7 | Djurgården | 2–0 | Halmstad | Stockholm |
| 14:00 | 39' (pen.) Igboananike; 47' Rajalakso | Report | | Stadium: Stockholms Stadion; Attendance: 7,329; Referee: Jonas Eriksson |

| 15 May 2011 8 | Gefle | 0–0 | Djurgården | Gävle |
| 16:00 | | Report | | Stadium: Strömvallen; Attendance: 4,508; Referee: Andreas Ekberg |

| 23 May 2011 9 | Mjällby | 3–0 | Djurgården | Hällevik |
| 19:00 | 9' Zavadil; 45' 61' El Kabir | Report | | Stadium: Strandvallen; Attendance: 4,109; Referee: Michael Lerjéus |

| 26 May 2011 10 | Djurgården | 0–1 | Elfsborg | Stockholm |
| 19:00 | | Report | 79' Nilsson | Stadium: Stockholms Stadion; Attendance: 6,444; Referee: Jonas Eriksson |

| 13 June 2011 11 | IFK Göteborg | 0–4 | Djurgården | Gothenburg |
| 19:00 | | Report | 25' Youssef; 42' Jonson; 59' Hämäläinen; 87' Hellquist | Stadium: Gamla Ullevi; Attendance: 10,892; Referee: Tobias Mattsson |

| 20 June 2011 12 | Djurgården | 3–0 | Syrianska | Solna |
| 19:00 | 13' Youssef; 69' (pen.) Toivio; 74' Gustafsson | Report | | Stadium: Råsunda Stadium; Attendance: 8,149; Referee: Martin Ingvarsson |

| 23 June 2011 13 | Örebro | 1–2 | Djurgården | Örebro |
| 19:00 | 28' (pen.) Paulinho | Report | 34' Toivio; 51' Hämäläinen | Stadium: Behrn Arena; Attendance: 8,912; Referee: Jonas Eriksson |

| 26 June 2011 14 | Djurgården | 1–0 | Häcken | Stockholm |
| 19:00 | 79' Sjölund | Report | | Stadium: Stockholms Stadion; Attendance: 7,008; Referee: Martin Hansson |

| 4 July 2011 15 | Djurgården | 1–1 | Helsingborg | Stockholm |
| 19:00 | 22' Hellquist | Report | 69' Gerndt | Stadium: Stockholms Stadion; Attendance: 9,385; Referee: Markus Strömbergsson |

| 11 July 2011 16 | Helsingborg | 3–0 | Djurgården | Helsingborg |
| 19:00 | 49' Gerndt; 54' Gashi; 84' Andersson | Report | | Stadium: Olympia; Attendance: 13,245; Referee: Stefan Johannesson |

| 16 July 2011 17 | Djurgården | 1–0 | Mjällby | Stockholm |
| 18:00 | 80' Oremo | Report | | Stadium: Stockholms Stadion; Attendance: 5,713; Referee: Martin Strömbergsson |

| 25 July 2011 18 | Elfsborg | 2–1 | Djurgården | Borås |
| 19:00 | 34' Mobaeck; 86' Ishizaki | Report | 18' Toivio | Stadium: Borås Arena; Attendance: 9,617; Referee: Martin Ingvarsson |

| 15 October 2011 19 | Malmö FF | 1–0 | Djurgården | Malmö |
| 16:00 | 45+1' Figueiredo | Report | | Stadium: Swedbank Stadion; Referee: Markus Strömbergsson |

| 7 August 2011 20 | Djurgården | 2–2 | GAIS | Stockholm |
| 19:00 | 57' Nymann; 90+1' Gustafsson | Report | 2' Gustafsson; 64' Bassombeng | Stadium: Stockholms Stadion; Attendance: 5,527; Referee: Michael Lerjeus |

| 14 August 2011 21 | Djurgården | 0–2 | Örebro | Stockholm |
| 19:00 | | Report | 24' Paulinho; 29' Rama | Stadium: Stockholms Stadion; Attendance: 6,298; Referee: Martin Ingvarsson |

| 21 August 2011 22 | Häcken | 2–0 | Djurgården | Gothenburg |
| 14:00 | 18' 68' Ranégie | Report | | Stadium: Rambergsvallen; Attendance: 2,397; Referee: Martin Strömbergsson |

| 25 August 2011 23 | Norrköping | 2–1 | Djurgården | Norrköping |
| 14:00 | 6' 11' Thorvaldsson | Report | 17' Youssef | Stadium: Nya Parken; Attendance: 8,135; Referee: Michael Lerjéus |

| 11 September 2011 24 | Djurgården | 4–3 | Trelleborg | Stockholm |
| 16:30 | 31' Agger; 49' 76' 81' Igboananike | Report | 24' 74' Jensen; 77' Haynes | Stadium: Stockholms Stadion; Attendance: 6,307; Referee: Daniel Stålhammar |

| 19 September 2011 25 | AIK | 0–1 | Djurgården | Solna |
| 19:00 | | Report | 20' Igboananike | Stadium: Råsunda Stadium; Attendance: 24,639; Referee: Jonas Eriksson |

| 23 September 2011 26 | Djurgården | 2–1 | Kalmar FF | Stockholm |
| 19:00 | 26' 64' Rajalakso | Report | 54' Bertilsson | Stadium: Stockholms Stadion; Attendance: 5,152; Referee: Martin Ingvarsson |

| 26 September 2011 27 | Djurgården | 1–2 | IFK Göteborg | Stockholm |
| 19:00 | 2' Toivio | Report | 52' Selakovic; 73' Stiller | Stadium: Stockholms Stadion; Attendance: 6,426; Referee: Martin Hansson |

| 30 September 2011 28 | Syrianska | 0–0 | Djurgården | Södertälje |
| 19:00 | | Report | | Stadium: Södertälje Fotbollsarena; Attendance: 4,261; Referee: Jonas Eriksson |

| 17 October 2011 29 | Halmstad | 1–3 | Djurgården | Halmstad |
| 19:00 | 24' Görlitz | Report | 26' Sjölund; 35' Toivio; 85' Jonson | Stadium: Örjans Vall; Attendance: 1,874; Referee: Michael Lerjéus |

| 23 September 2011 30 | Djurgården | 1–1 | Gefle | Stockholm |
| 16:30 | 35' Rajalakso | Report | 45+1' Hansson | Stadium: Stockholms Stadion; Attendance: 10,224; Referee: Stefan Johannesson |

=== Svenska Cupen ===
| Name | Goals |
|---|---|
| (Nigeria) Kennedy Igboananike | 1 |
| (Finland) Daniel Sjölund | 1 |

| Name | Assists |
|---|---|
| (Sweden) Joel Riddez | 1 |

| 12 May 2011 Last 32 | IFK Luleå | 1–2 | Djurgården | Luleå |
| 18:00 | 41' Östlind | Report | 67' Sjölund; 89' (pen.) Igboananike |

| 29 May 2011 Last 16 | IFK Göteborg | 1–0 | Djurgården | Gothenburg |
| 18:00 | 86' Drugge | Report | | Attendance: 3,887; Referee: Jim Petersson |

=== Supporter incident ===
Djurgården were involved in an incident at Swedbank Stadion, in a match against Malmö FF, on 30 July 2011. The match was abandoned after eleven minutes, with Malmö FF at that time leading 1–0. The minute before, Djurgårdens IF forward Daniel Sjölund was given a yellow card. Six fireworks were launched, forcing referee Martin Hansson to abandon the match. According to Canal+, one of the fireworks was close to hitting a photographer. There were different opinions as to where the fireworks came from: Canal+ believed that the fireworks came from the section above the Djurgården terrace while the police believed that the fireworks came from within the Djurgården section. Swedish Discipline Committee chairman Khennet Thallinger stated that they "want to preserve the due process". On 5 September 2011, the Committee decided that the game would be replayed from kick-off. The Committee explained that the evidence saying Djurgården were responsible for the firecrackers was not considered strong enough to blame them. As such, neither Djurgården nor Malmö were fined any sums of money. The SFA's Competition Committee decided that the rematch would be played on 15 October 2011. This forced the Committee to delay the Halmstad–Djurgården and Malmö–Syrianska games in-between to 17 October, as all Allsvenskan teams should have at least two rest-days between each game. Djurgården lost the rematch 1–0.
