= 2009 Djurgårdens IF season =

Djurgården
2009 season
- Chairman: Per Darnell
- Manager: Andreé Jeglertz
- Stadium: Stockholms Stadion
- Allsvenskan: 14th
- Svenska Cupen: 4th round
- Top goalscorer: League: Patrik Haginge, Hrvoje Milić, Sebastian Rajalakso; Daniel Sjölund & Christer Youssef (3); All: Hrvoje Milić & Christer Youssef (4)
- Highest home attendance: 21,884 (18 May vs AIK, Allsvenskan)
- Lowest home attendance: 6,196 (24 October vs Örgryte IS, Allsvenskan)

Djurgården will in the 2009 season compete in the Allsvenskan and Svenska Cupen. Djurgården sacked both managers after the terrible 2008 year, Siggi Jónsson and Paul Lindholm. The new coaches were presented on December 12, 2008, Andreé Jeglertz and former DIF-manager and two times Swedish champion with Djurgården, Zoran Lukic. Djurgården finished at place 14 after winning all the three last games and played Assyriska in qualification for Allsvenskan. Assyriska won the first game at home with 2–0, but Djurgården came back and won 3–0 at home in extra time, which means that Djurgården will play Allsvenskan 2010

On June 3, 2009, Zoran Lukic left the club. Andreé Jeglertz is still in the club.
On June 12 former-Djurgården player Steve Galloway returns to the club as assistant manager. On November 11 Former club director Tommy Jacobson was selected as new club director. 25 million Swedish crown is coming with him to the club, and 15 of that 25 million is going to be spent on new players for next season.

== Squad ==
- According to dif.se
- updated November 10, 2009

N	Pos.	Nat.	Name	Age	EU	Since	App	Goals	Ends	Transfer fee	Notes
2	MF	(Sweden)	Philip Hellquist	33	EU	2008	25	2		Youth system	
3	DF	(Benin)	Yosif Ayuba	34	EU	2009	12	1	2012		
4	DF	(Sweden)	Patrik Haginge	40	EU	2008	37	3	2011	Undisclosed	
5	DF	(Sweden)	Petter Gustafsson	40	EU	2009	31	0	2011		
6	DF	(Finland)	Toni Kuivasto	49	EU	2003	216	10	2009		
7	MF	(Nigeria)	Prince Ikpe Ekong	46	Non-EU	2008	38	2	2012	Undisclosed	
8	DF	(Germany)	Jan Tauer	41	EU	2007	70	3	2009		
9	FW	(Sweden)	Johan Oremo	38	EU	2008	34	4	2012	10 000 000 SEK	
10	MF	(Sweden) (Syria)	Christer Youssef	37	EU	2009	27	4	2011		
11	MF	(Finland)	Daniel Sjölund (VC)	42	EU	2003	173	33	2009		
12	FW	(Sweden)	Mattias Jonson	51	EU	2005	83	23	2009		
14	DF	(Sweden) (The Gambia)	Kebba Ceesay	37	EU	2007	50	1	2010		
15	GK	(The Gambia)	Pa Dembo Touray	44	EU	2000	179	1	2011		Has SWE passport
16	DF	(Sweden)	Markus Johannesson (C)	49	EU	2004	183	1	2009		
17	FW	(Zambia)	Boyd Mwila	40	EU	2009	23	2	2012		Has SWE passport
18	FW	(Sweden)	Mikael Dahlberg (VC)	40	EU	2007	84	9	2009		
19	FW	(Croatia)	Hrvoje Milić	35	Non-EU	2009	34	4	2013		
23	MF	(Argentina)	Leandro Ortiz	35	Non-EU	2009	0	0	2009		
24	DF	(Sweden)	Peter Magnusson	40	EU	2008	28	0	2009		
25	MF	(Sweden)	Sebastian Rajalakso	36	EU	2008	59	10	2009		
27	MF	(Sweden)	Dan Burlin	44	EU	2009	9	1	2009		
28	MF	(Sweden)	Trimi Makolli	33	EU	2009	3	0		Youth system	
30	GK	(Sweden)	Oskar Wahlström	48	EU	2004	46	0	2009		

=== Squad stats ===
Last updated on 3 November 2009.

No.	Pos	Nat	Player	Total		Allsvenskan		Svenska Cupen		Relegation	
No.	Pos	Nat	Player	Apps	Goals	Apps	Goals	Apps	Goals	Apps	Goals
2	MF	(Sweden) SWE	Philip Hellquist	15	1	12	0	2	1	1	0
3	DF	(Benin) BEN	Yosif Ayuba	12	1	11	1	0	0	1	0
4	DF	(Sweden) SWE	Patrik Haginge	17	3	14	3	1	0	2	0
5	DF	(Sweden) SWE	Petter Gustafsson	31	0	30	0	1	0	0	0
6	DF	(Finland) FIN	Toni Kuivasto	32	1	29	1	1	0	2	0
7	MF	(Nigeria) NGA	Prince Ikpe Ekong	20	1	17	1	1	0	2	0
8	DF	(Germany) GER	Jan Tauer	18	1	14	0	2	0	2	1
9	FW	(Sweden) SWE	Johan Oremo	15	0	14	0	1	0	0	0
10	MF	(Sweden) SWE	Christer Youssef	27	4	24	3	1	0	2	1
11	MF	(Finland) FIN	Daniel Sjölund	19	3	19	3	0	0	0	0
12	FW	(Sweden) SWE	Mattias Jonson	9	2	8	1	0	0	1	1
14	DF	(Sweden) SWE	Kebba Ceesay	29	1	26	1	1	0	2	0
15	GK	(The Gambia) GAM	Pa Dembo Touray	28	0	25	0	1	0	2	0
16	DF	(Sweden) SWE	Markus Johannesson	25	1	22	1	1	0	2	0
17	FW	(Zambia) ZAM	Boyd Mwila	23	2	19	2	2	0	2	0
18	FW	(Sweden) SWE	Mikael Dahlberg	30	0	27	0	1	0	2	0
19	MF	(Croatia) CRO	Hrvoje Milić	31	4	27	3	2	1	2	0
20	MF	(Sweden) SWE	Martin Andersson	5	0	3	0	2	0	0	0
23	MF	(Argentina) ARG	Leandro Ortiz	0	0	0	0	0	0	0	0
22	MF	(Slovenia) SVN	Andrej Komac	8	0	7	0	1	0	0	0
24	DF	(Sweden) SWE	Peter Magnusson	15	0	13	0	2	0	0	0
25	MF	(Sweden) SWE	Sebastian Rajalakso	31	3	28	3	1	0	2	0
27	MF	(Sweden) SWE	Dan Burlin	9	1	9	1	0	0	0	0
28	MF	(Sweden) SWE	Trimi Makolli	3	0	1	0	2	0	0	0
29	MF	(Finland) FIN	Aki Riihilahti	1	0	0	0	1	0	0	0
30	GK	(Sweden) SWE	Oskar Wahlström	7	0	6	0	1	0	0	0
35	GK	(Sweden) SWE	Tommi Vaiho	0	0	0	0	0	0	0	0

== Transfers ==
=== Players in ===
No.	Pos.	Nat.	Name	Age	EU	Moving from	Type	Transfer window	Ends	Transfer fee	Source
10	AM	(Sweden) (Syria)	Youssef	37	EU	IF Brommapojkarna	Transfer	Winter	2011	Free	DIF.se
5	LB	(Sweden)	Gustafsson	40	EU	Skellefteå FF	Transfer	Winter	2011	Undisclosed	DIF.se
19	MF	(Croatia)	Milić	35	Non-EU	Hajduk Split (Croatia)	Transfer	Winter	2012	Undisclosed	DIF.se
17	FW	(Zambia)	Mwila	40	Non-EU	Örgryte IS	Transfer	Winter	2012	Undisclosed	DIF.se
3	DF	(Benin)	Ayuba	34	EU	Vasalunds IF	Transfer	Summer	2012	Undisclosed	DIF.se
27	MF	(Sweden)	Burlin	44	EU	Skellefteå FF	Loan	Summer	2009		DIF.se
23	MF	(Argentina)	Ortiz	35	Non-EU	River Plate (Argentina)	Loan	Summer	2009		DIF.se

=== Players out ===
No.	Pos.	Nat.	Name	Age	EU	Moving to	Type	Transfer window	Transfer fee	Source
–	DF	(Sweden)	Boskailo	20	EU	Västerås SK	Contract ended	Winter	Free	VSK.nu
19	FW	(Brazil)	Quirino	23	Non-EU	Consadole Sapporo (Japan)	Transfer	Winter	2 500 000 SEK	DIF.se
13	DF	(Sweden)	Johansson	20	EU	Örebro SK	Transfer	Winter	Undisclosed	DIF.se
28	AM	(Sweden)	Näfver	22	EU	Örebro SK	End of loan	Winter		DIF.se
9	FW	(Sweden) (Ghana)	Kusi-Asare	28	EU	Esbjerg fB (Denmark)	Contract ended	Winter	Free	DIF.se
10	MF	(Brazil)	Enrico	24	Non-EU	Vasco da Gama (Brazil)	Transfer	Winter	Undisclosed	DIF.se
17	MF	(Sweden)	Batan	23	EU	Assyriska FF	Loan	Winter		[]
22	MF	(Slovenia)	Komac	29	EU		Contract ended	Summer		[]
29	MF	(Finland)	Riihilahti	48	EU		Contract ended	Summer		DIF.se
20	MF	(Sweden)	Andersson	42	EU	Vasalunds IF	Loan	Summer		DIF.se

Last updated: 10 July

== Club ==
=== Coaching staff ===
Position	Staff
Manager	(Sweden) Andreé Jeglertz
Assistant manager	(England) Steve Galloway
Goalkeeping coach	(Sweden) Kjell Frisk
Fitness coach	(Iceland) Palmar Hreinsson

Last updated: 12 June
Source: Djurgårdens IF

=== Kit ===
Supplier: Adidas
Sponsor(s): ICA

Home 2009	Away 2009

=== Other information ===
Chairman	(Sweden) Per Darnell
Sport director	(Sweden) Göran Aral
Ground (capacity and dimensions)	Stockholm Stadion (14 417 / 105x70 m)

Updated to match played 25 January
Source: Djurgårdens IF and Stockholm Stadion

== Allsvenskan ==
=== Top scorers Allsvenskan ===
Name	Goals
(Croatia) Hrvoje Milić	3
(Sweden) Sebastian Rajalakso	3
(Finland) Daniel Sjölund	3
(Sweden) Christer Youssef	3
(Sweden) Patrik Haginge	3
(Zambia) Boyd Mwila	2
(Finland) Toni Kuivasto	1
(Sweden) Mattias Jonson	1
(Sweden) Kebba Ceesay	1
(Sweden) Dan Burlin	1
(Benin) Yosif Ayuba	1
(Nigeria) Prince Ikpe Ekong	1
(Sweden) Markus Johannesson	1

Name	Assists
(Croatia) Hrvoje Milić	2
(Sweden) Johan Oremo	2
(Finland) Daniel Sjölund	1
(Zambia) Boyd Mwila	1
(The Gambia) Pa Dembo Touray	1
(Germany) Jan Tauer	1
(Sweden) Mikael Dahlberg	1
(Sweden) Mattias Jonson	1

=== Competitive matches ===
6 April 2009
19:00

Djurgården	1 – 0	Örebro
Sjölund 78' (pen.)	Report

Stockholms Stadion, Stockholm
Attendance: 11 641
Referee: Åke Andreasson

11 April 2009
14:00

Göteborg	6 – 0	Djurgården
Selakovic 3'; Söder 6'; Hysén 28' 42'; Sigurdsson 84'; Wernbloom 88'

Gamla Ullevi, Gothenburg
Attendance: 18,276
Referee: Markus Strömbergsson

15 April 2009
19:00

Djurgården	0 – 0	Gefle
	Report

Stockholms Stadion, Stockholm
Attendance: 7,283
Referee: Michael Lerjéus

20 April 2009
20:00

Hammarby	3 – 1	Djurgården
E. Johansson 30', Davies 66', Söderström 81'		Kuivasto 12'

Råsunda, Solna
Attendance: 16,238
Referee: Stefan Johannesson

24 April 2009
18:00

Djurgården	0 – 2	Brommapojkarna
		Runnemo 1'; Haglund 70'

Stockholms Stadion, Stockholm
Attendance: 9,115
Referee: Håkan Jonasson

29 April 2009
19:00

Halmstad	3 – 0	Djurgården
A. Johansson 23'; E. Kujovic 82' 88'	Report

Örjans Vall, Halmstad
Attendance: 5,478
Referee: Jonas Eriksson

4 May 2009
19:00

Djurgården	2 – 1	GAIS
Rajalakso 11'; Mwila 32'	Report	Wanderson 37'

Stockholms Stadion, Stockholm
Attendance: 7,218
Referee: Daniel Stålhammar

10 May 2009
14:30

Malmö	2 – 1	Djurgården
Harbuzi 6'; Wilton Figueiredo 68'		Rajalakso 40'

Swedbank Stadion, Malmö
Attendance: 14,054
Referee: Markus Strömbergsson

18 May 2009
20:00

Djurgården	0 – 1	AIK
	Report	Óbolo 8'

Råsunda, Solna
Attendance: 21,884
Referee: Martin Hansson

21 May 2009
17:00

Trelleborg	3 – 0	Djurgården
Jensen 36', 77'; Haynes 60'	Report

Vångavallen, Trelleborg
Attendance: 3,060
Referee: Jonas Eriksson

26 May 2009
19:00

Djurgården	1 – 0	Häcken
Mwila 41'	Report

Stockholms Stadion, Stockholm
Attendance: 7,031
Referee: Daniel Stålhammar

31 May 2009
17:00

Örgryte	0 – 0	Djurgården

Gamla Ullevi, Gothenburg

5 July 2009
18:00

Djurgården	2 – 1	Helsingborg
Haginge 13'; Rajalakso 31'	Report	Jönsson 61'

Stockholms Stadion, Stockholm
Attendance: 8,527
Referee: Martin Hansson

11 July 2009
16:00

Kalmar	6 – 1	Djurgården
R. Elm 9', 53'; Eriksson 56', 87'; D. Elm 63'; Dauda 89'	Report	Jonson 36'

Fredriksskans IP, Kalmar
Attendance: 6,812
Referee: Daniel Stålhammar

19 July 2009
18:00

Djurgården	1 – 2	Elfsborg
Ceesay 55'	Report	Bajrami 18'; Lučić 81'

Stockholms Stadion, Stockholm
Attendance: 7,497
Referee: Jonas Eriksson

26 July 2009
18:00

Elfsborg	3 – 1	Djurgården
Avdić 79'; Nordmark 80'; Gustafsson 90+2' (o.g.)	Report	Sjölund 40' (pen.)

Borås Arena, Borås
Attendance: 10,471
Referee: Martin Ingvarsson

3 August 2009

Gefle	2 – 0	Djurgården
Lantto 5'; Westlin 12'	Report

Strömvallen, Gävle
Attendance: 6,287
Referee: Martin Ingvarsson

9 August 2009

Djurgården	0 – 1	Hammarby
	Report	Johannesson 20' (o.g.)

Råsunda, Solna
Attendance: 16,374
Referee: Jonas Eriksson

17 August 2009

Örebro	2 – 0	Djurgården
Nordback 4' (pen.); Johansson 86'	Report

Behrn Arena, Örebro
Attendance: 9,094
Referee: Åke Andreasson

24 August 2009
19:00

Djurgården	0 – 0	Göteborg
	Report

Stockholms Stadion, Stockholm
Attendance: 7,535
Referee: Daniel Stålhammar

31 August 2009

GAIS	1 – 1	Djurgården
Spong 16'	Report	Sjölund 21'

Gamla Ullevi, Gothenburg
Attendance: 4,782
Referee: Markus Strömbergsson

14 September 2009
19:00

Djurgården	1 – 2	Malmö
Youssef 21'	Report	Ofere 40', 56'

Stockholms Stadion, Stockholm
Attendance: 7,970
Referee: Michael Lerjéus

20 September 2009

Brommapojkarna	1 – 4	Djurgården
Runnemo 75'	Report	Milić 30'; Youssef 48', 63'; Burlin 65'

Grimsta IP, Stockholm
Attendance: 4,000
Referee: Markus Strömbergsson

24 September 2009
19:00

Djurgården	0 – 2	Halmstad
	Report	Olsson 57', 60'

Stockholms Stadion, Stockholm
Attendance: 6,422
Referee: Jonas Eriksson

28 September 2009

AIK	2 – 0	Djurgården
Flávio 15', 59'	Report

Råsunda, Solna
Attendance: 26,241
Referee: Stefan Johannesson

3 October 2009

Djurgården	0 – 0	Trelleborg
	Report

Stockholms Stadion, Stockholm
Attendance: 6,212
Referee: Martin Hansson

19 October 2009

Häcken	2 – 1	Djurgården
Vinicius 15'; Chibuike 78'	Report	Milić 40'

Rambergsvallen, Gothenburg
Attendance: 1,845
Referee: Sven-Martin Åkesson

24 October 2009

Djurgården	2 – 1	Örgryte
Haginge 31', (red card) 55'; Milić 61' (pen.), (red card) 62'	Report	Mellquist 53'

Stockholms Stadion, Stockholm
Attendance: 6,196
Referee: Martin Hansson

28 October 2009

Helsingborg	0 – 2	Djurgården
	Report	Ayuba 36'; Ekong 69'

Olympia, Helsingborg
Attendance: 11,671
Referee: Michael Lerjéus

1 November 2009

Djurgården	2 – 0	Kalmar
Haginge 27'; Johannesson 56'	Report

Stockholms Stadion, Stockholm
Attendance: 10,630
Referee: Markus Strömbergsson

=== Relegation Playoffs ===
==== Top scorers Relegation ====
Name	Goals
(Germany) Jan Tauer	1
(Sweden) Christer Youssef	1
(Sweden) Mattias Jonson	1

Name	Assists
(Croatia) Hrvoje Milić	2
(Sweden) Patrik Haginge	1

4 November 2009
19:15

Assyriska	2 – 0	Djurgården
Östlundh 38'; Marklund 47'	Report

Södertälje Fotbollsarena, Södertälje
Attendance: 7,131
Referee: Markus Strömbergsson

8 November 2009
16:45

Djurgården	3 – 0 (a.e.t.)	Assyriska
Tauer 52'; Youssef 60'; Jonson 117'	Report

Stockholms Stadion, Stockholm
Attendance: 10,458
Referee: Martin Ingvarsson

Djurgården won 3 – 2 on aggregate.

== Svenska Cupen ==
=== Top scorers Svenska Cupen ===
Name	Goals
(Sweden) Philip Hellquist	1
(Croatia) Hrvoje Milić	1

=== Third Round ===
26 April 2009
17:00

Hässleholm	0 – 2	Djurgården
	Report	Hellquist 54'; Milić 82'

Österås, Hässleholm
Attendance: 872

=== Last 16 ===
13 May 2009
19:00

Gefle	1–0	Djurgården
Hansson 14'	Report

Strömvallen, Gävle
Attendance: 1,231
Referee: Fredrik Lundberg

== Friendlies ==
Match	Date	Competition or tour	Ground	Opponent	Score^{1}	Scorers	GD
1	14 February	—	HR	IK Sirius	1 - 1	24' Makolli	0
2	21 February	—	AR	IF Brommapojkarna	1 - 1	64' (pen.) Komac	0
3	28 February	—	A	Örebro SK	1 - 2	33' Oremo	-1
4	5 March	—	A	Vasalunds IF	3 - 1	7' Dahlberg; 50', 71' Komac	2
5	8 March	—	HR	IFK Norrköping	2 - 2	34' Dahlberg; 72' Youssef	0
6	14 March	—	N	FC Inter (Finland)	1 - 1	85' Makolli	0
7	19 March	Portugal Camp	A	Portimonense (Portugal)	2 - 2	26' Dahlberg; 68' Kuivasto	0
8	30 March	—	A	Helsingborgs IF	2 - 2	23', 26' Hellquist	0
9	24 June	—	A	Skellefteå FF	4 - 0	21', 33' Mwila; 76' Youssef; 84' (o.g.)	4
10	28 June	—		Gefle IF	0 - 1		-1

Last updated: 23 January
^{1}Djurgården goals come first.
Country's flag depict country of foreign team to that of Djurgården.
^{2} DIF.se
Ground: H = Home; A = Away; N = Neutral; HR = Home replacement; AR = Away replacement; GD = Goal difference

=== Top scorers Pre-season ===
Name	Goals
(Slovenia) Andrej Komac	3
(Sweden) Mikael Dahlberg	3
(Sweden) Trimi Makolli	2
(Sweden) Philip Hellquist	2
(Sweden) Johan Oremo	1
(Finland) Toni Kuivasto	1
(Sweden) Christer Youssef	1
