= Rudboda =

Neighborhood in Lidingö Municipality, Sweden

Coordinates: 59°22′29″N 18°10′46″E

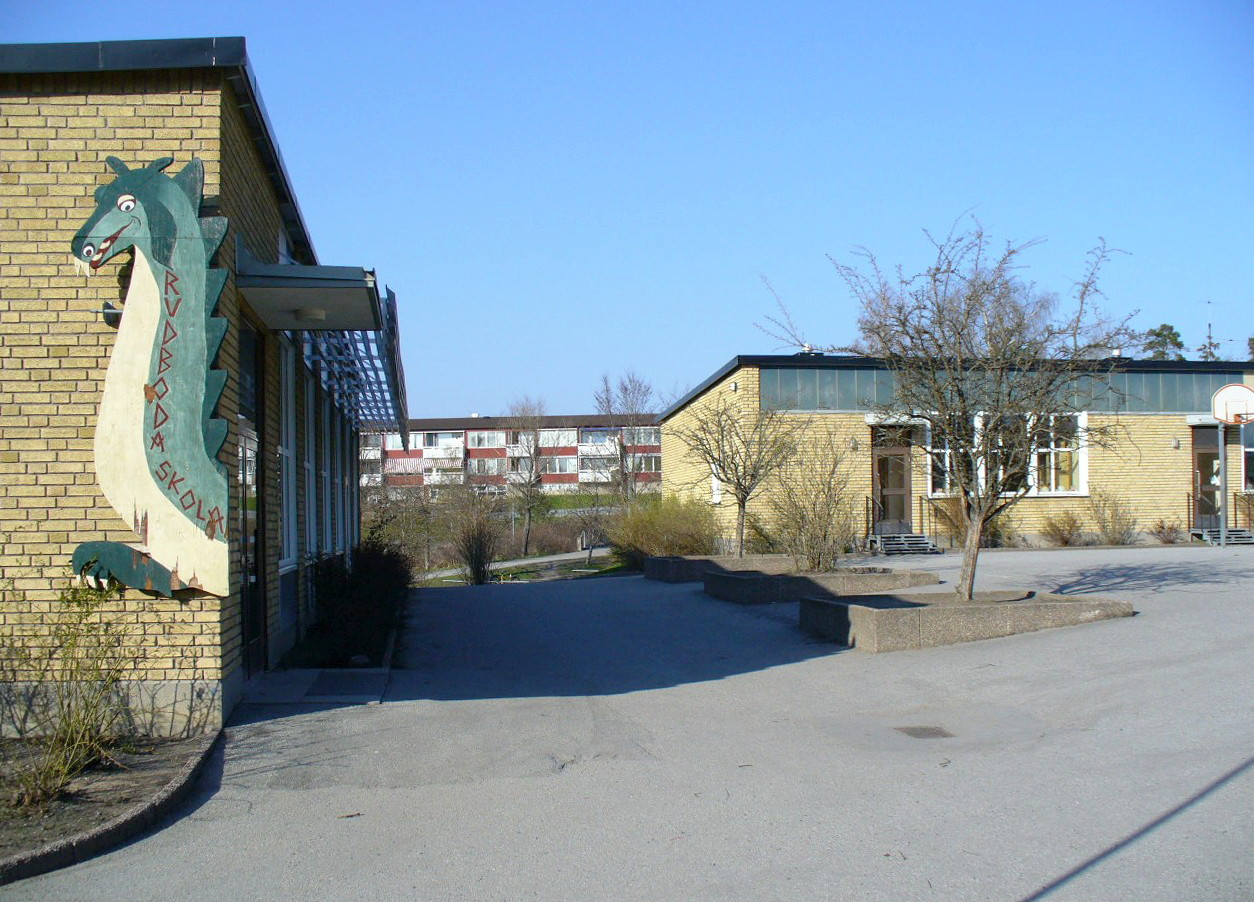
Rudboda school, Lidingö, Sweden

Rudboda is a neighborhood in Lidingö Municipality, Sweden, with some 3,000 inhabitants. Rudboda is dominated by single-family houses. The neighborhood has one school and a shopping square. There was a church, which has now been desecrated. Rudboda also contain Bosön, a large sports complex, and the headquarters of the Swedish Sports Confederation.
