= Ayuba =

African name

Ayuba is an African name that may refer to

Given name

- Ayuba Suleiman Diallo (1701–1773), victim of the Atlantic slave trade from Senegal

Surname

- Abubakar Tanko Ayuba, Nigerian politician
- Adewale Ayuba (born 1966), Nigerian singer
- Yosif Ayuba (born 1990), Swedish footballer of Beninese descent
