= Eric Bassombeng =

Cameroonian footballer

Personal information
- Full name: Eric Magloire Bassombeng
- Date of birth: 11 March 1983 (age 43)
- Place of birth: Cameroon
- Height: 1.81 m (5 ft 11 1/2 in)
- Position: Midfielder

Youth career
- Racing FC Bafoussam

Senior career*
Years	Team	Apps	(Gls)
2002–2007	Astres FC		
2008–2010	Örebro SK	44	(5)
2011–2012	GAIS	42	(6)
- * Club domestic league appearances and goals as of 24 September 2012

Eric Magloire Bassombeng (born 11 March 1983) is a Cameroonian footballer who plays as a midfielder. He is a free agent and his latest club was GAIS.
