= Artsyom Skitaw =

Belarusian footballer

Personal information
- Date of birth: 21 January 1991 (age 35)
- Place of birth: Vitebsk, Byelorussian SSR, Soviet Union
- Height: 1.81 m (5 ft 11 1/2 in)
- Position: Midfielder

Youth career
- 2007–2009: Vitebsk

Senior career*
Years	Team	Apps	(Gls)
2009–2024	Vitebsk	331	(1)

International career^{‡}
2010–2012	Belarus U21	9	(0)
2017	Belarus B	2	(0)
- * Club domestic league appearances and goals as of 31 December 2024 ‡ National team caps and goals as of 16 July 2017

Artsyom Skitaw (Belarusian: Арцём Скітаў; Russian: Артём Скитов, romanized: Artyom Skitov; born 21 January 1991) is a Belarusian former professional football. A one-club man, he spent his entire professional career at FC Vitebsk, before announcing his retirement in early 2025.
