= Jonas Lantto =

Swedish footballer (born 1987)

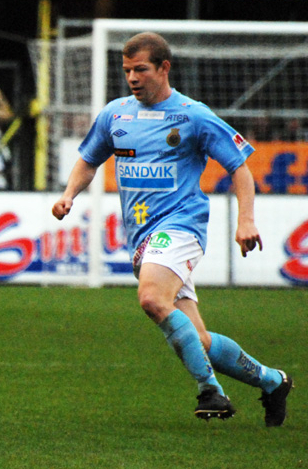

Personal information
- Date of birth: May 22, 1987 (age 39)
- Place of birth: Kiruna, Sweden
- Height: 1.69 m (5 ft 6 1/2 in)
- Position: Winger

Team information
- Current team: FK Karlskrona
- Number: 17

Youth career
- Kiruna FF

Senior career*
Years	Team	Apps	(Gls)
2003–2006	Kiruna FF		
2007–2018	Gefle IF	331	(30)
2019–	FK Karlskrona		

International career
2004	Sweden U17	2	(1)
2006	Sweden U19	2	(1)
2008	Sweden U21	1	(0)
- * Club domestic league appearances and goals as of 25 January 2019

Jonas Lantto (born May 22, 1987) is a Swedish footballer who plays as a winger for FK Karlskrona.

== Career ==
He joined Gefle IF in 2007 after a standout season in Kiruna FF where he was named footballer of the year in Norrbotten. Lantto left Gefle at the end of 2018.

On 2 March 2019, Lantto joined FK Karlskrona.
