= Danilo Kuzmanović =

Serbian footballer

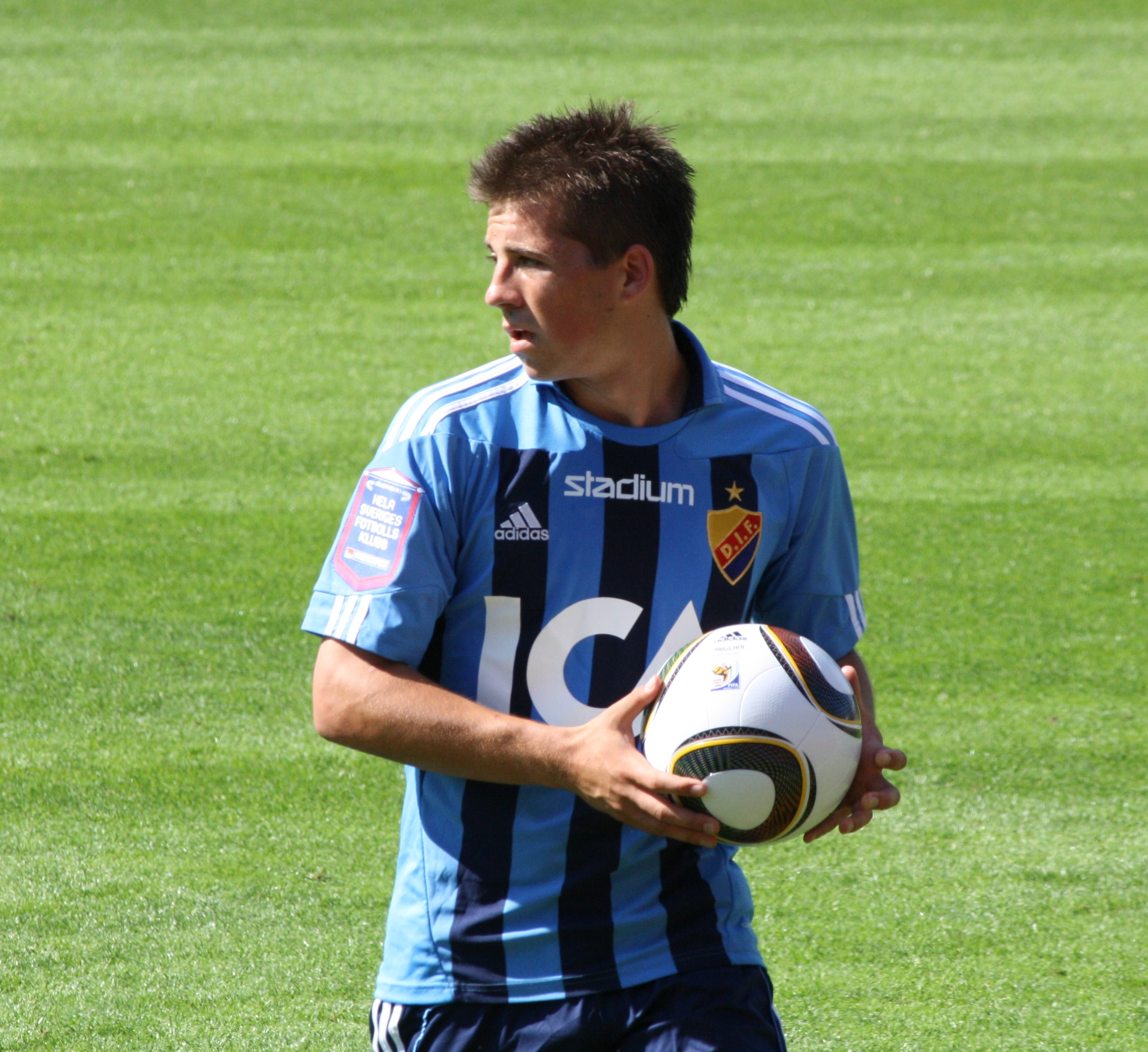
- Kuzmanović playing for Djurgårdens IF

Personal information
- Date of birth: January 4, 1992 (age 34)
- Place of birth: Belgrade, Yugoslavia
- Height: 1.75 m (5 ft 9 in)
- Position: Left-back

Team information
- Current team: Halsen

Youth career
- –2009: Red Star Belgrade
- 2009–2010: Djurgårdens IF

Senior career*
Years	Team	Apps	(Gls)
2010–2011	Djurgårdens IF	1	(0)
2012	Rad	0	(0)
2012–2013	Jedinstvo Putevi	1	(0)
2013	Vrčin		
2013–2014	Donji Srem	10	(0)
2014–2016	Zemun	22	(0)
2016	Täby FK	6	(1)
2017	Frej Täby	18	(1)
2020	Fram Larvik	12	(0)
2021-	Halsen	21	(0)

International career
2011	Serbia U19	2	(0)
- * Club domestic league appearances and goals as of 31 October 2024

Danilo Kuzmanović (born January 4, 1992) is a Serbian footballer who currently plays in Norway for Halsen.

Born in Belgrade, he previously played for Swedish side Djurgårdens IF and during the winter break of the 2011-12 season he rejoined Serbian SuperLiga side FK Rad.

He later played in the lower leagues in Sweden and Norway.
