= Joakim Alriksson =

Swedish footballer (born 1992)

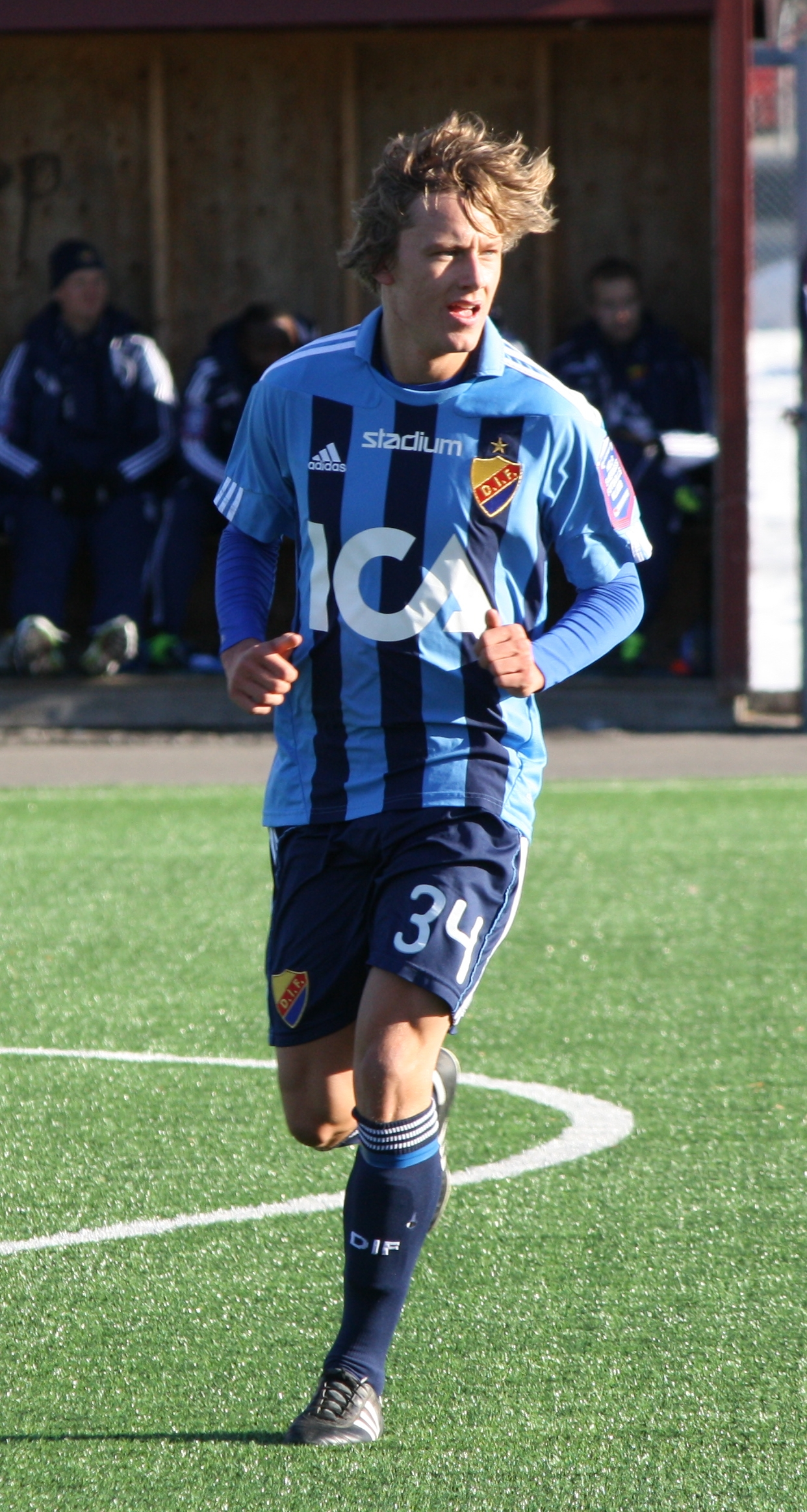

Personal information
- Full name: Joakim Alriksson
- Date of birth: August 18, 1992 (age 34)
- Place of birth: Heby, Sweden
- Height: 1.73 m (5 ft 8 in)
- Position: Midfielder

Team information
- Current team: Enskede IK

Youth career
- Heby AIF
- Djurgårdens IF

Senior career*
Years	Team	Apps	(Gls)
2010–2011	Djurgårdens IF	5	(0)
2012	Ängelholms FF	0	(0)
2012	Enköpings SK	10	(0)
2013–2015	AFC United	52	(7)
2016–	Enskede IK		

International career
2011	Sweden U19	2	(1)
- * Club domestic league appearances and goals as of 11 March 2016

Joakim Alriksson (born August 18, 1992), is a Swedish footballer who plays for Enskede IK as a midfielder.

== Career ==
He made his debut against Halmstads BK on 7 November 2010 in the last round of Allsvenskan, while still playing for the junior squad. He was moved up to the senior squad for the 2011 season.
