= Dan Burlin =

Swedish footballer

Personal information
- Date of birth: 13 August 1980 (age 46)
- Height: 1.78 m (5 ft 10 in)
- Position: Midfielder

Senior career*
Years	Team	Apps	(Gls)
2001–2002	Skellefteå AIK		
2003	Åtvidabergs FF		
2007	Umeå FC		
2008–2012	Skellefteå FF		
2009	→ Djurgårdens IF (loan)	9	(1)
- * Club domestic league appearances and goals

Dan Burlin (born 13 August 1980) is a Swedish former professional footballer who played as a midfielder. He spent the 2009 season on loan to Djurgårdens IF. He played for Åtvidabergs FF in Superettan during the 2003 season.
