= Joakim Runnemo =

Swedish footballer (born 1986)

Personal information
- Full name: Joakim Ulf Bertil Runnemo
- Date of birth: 18 December 1986 (age 39)
- Place of birth: Sweden
- Height: 1.77 m (5 ft 9 1/2 in)
- Position: Midfielder

Youth career
- Boo FF

Senior career*
Years	Team	Apps	(Gls)
2005–2010	IF Brommapojkarna	139	(29)
2011–2012	Ljungskile SK	48	(13)
2013–2014	IK Sirius	39	(10)
2015–2018	IK Frej	115	(26)
- * Club domestic league appearances and goals as of 10 November 2018

Joakim Ulf Bertil Runnemo (born 18 December 1986) is a Swedish footballer who plays as a midfielder.
