= Martin Andersson (footballer, born 1982) =

Swedish football player

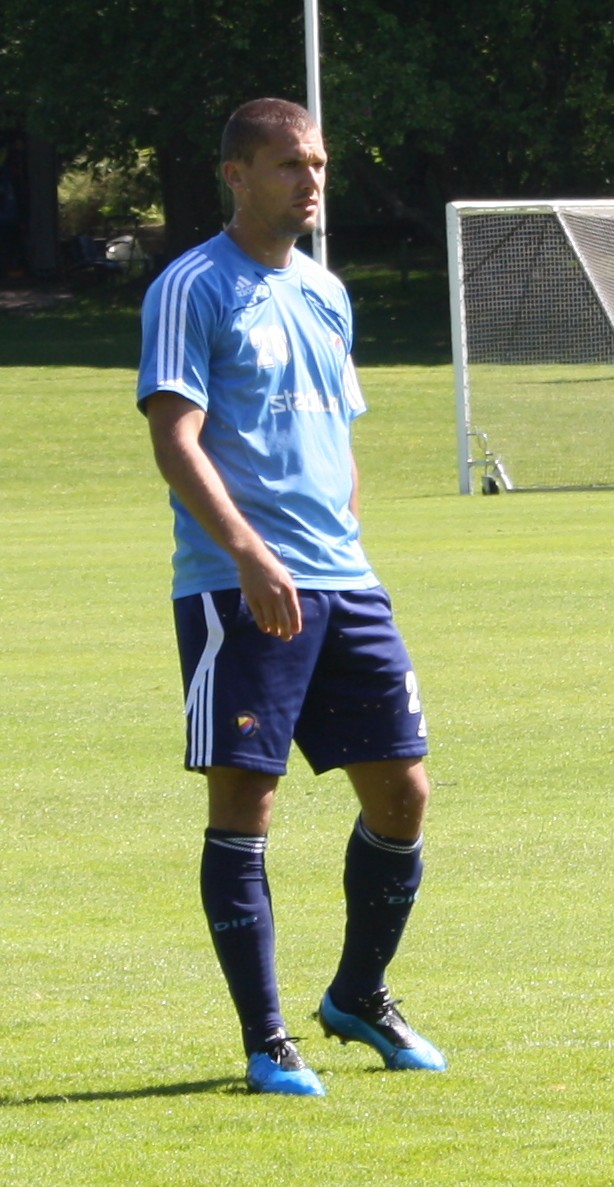

Personal information
- Full name: Martin Andersson
- Date of birth: 9 May 1982 (age 44)
- Position: Midfielder

Senior career*
Years	Team	Apps	(Gls)
1999–2007	Enköpings SK		
2008–2010	Djurgårdens IF	16	(0)
2009	→ Vasalunds IF (loan)	17	(0)
- * Club domestic league appearances and goals

Martin Andersson (born May 9, 1982) is a Swedish football player, currently a free agent.

== Career ==
Andersson started his career at Enköpings SK. He joined Djurgårdens IF in the beginning of 2008 together with Sebastian Rajalakso, also from Enköpings SK. He made his Allsvenskan debut against IFK Norrköping on March 30, 2008. Due to an injury in the groin, Andersson used painkillers during the spring 2008 to be able to play Djurgården's games. The injury eventually caused too much pain and Andersson did not play for much of the 2008 season. He left on loan to Vasalunds IF in 2009 and returned to Djurgården after the season. His contract with Djurgården expired in December 2010 and was not extended.
