= Tommi Vaiho =

Swedish footballer (born 1988)

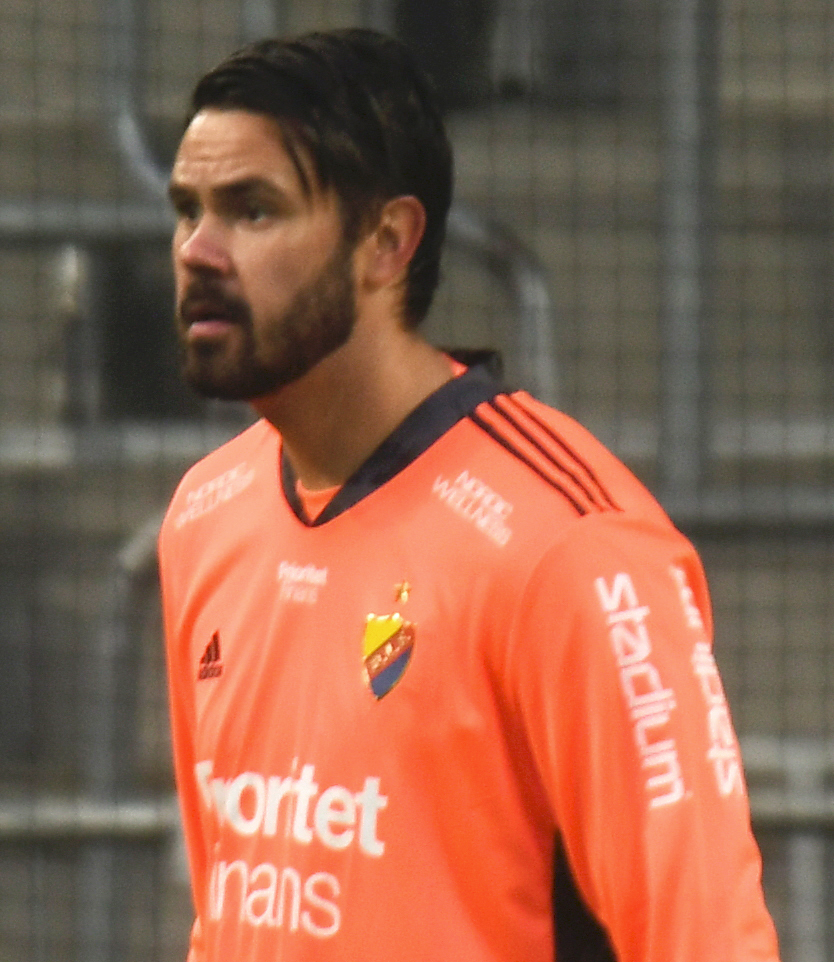
- Vaiho playing for Djurgårdens IF, 2020

Personal information
- Date of birth: 13 September 1988 (age 38)
- Place of birth: Stockholm, Sweden
- Height: 1.88 m (6 ft 2 in)
- Position: Goalkeeper

Team information
- Current team: IFK Norrköping
- Number: 30

Youth career
- –2000: Djurgården-Kista
- 2000–2002: IF Brommapojkarna
- 2003–2004: Djurgårdens IF

Senior career*
Years	Team	Apps	(Gls)
2005–2013	Djurgårdens IF	23	(0)
2007	→ Värtans IK (loan)	22	(0)
2008	→ IK Frej (loan)	9	(0)
2009	→ Vasalunds IF (loan)	19	(0)
2013–2016	GAIS	118	(0)
2017–2023	Djurgårdens IF	51	(0)
2022	→ Sirius (loan)	14	(0)
2024–	IFK Norrköping	0	(0)

International career^{‡}
2003–2005	Sweden U17	3	(0)
- * Club domestic league appearances and goals as of 5 November 2023 ‡ National team caps and goals as of 11 February 2009

Tommi Vaiho (born 13 September 1988) is a Swedish footballer who plays for IFK Norrköping in Allsvenskan as a goalkeeper.

== Career ==
Vaiho began his career with IF Brommapojkarna and moved in 2003 to Djurgårdens IF.

He joined the club from the junior squad at the start of the 2005 season, but is still to make his Allsvenskan debut for DIF, he played only three Svenska Cupen games. He was later loaned out in the season 2007 to Värtans IK and in 2008 played eleven games for IK Frej in the Division 2 Norra Svealand. Vaiho left on loan to Vasalunds IF in January 2009. He returned to Djurgården after the season. Vaiho made his Allsvenskan debut on 14 March 2010, against BK Häcken.

On 8 December 2016, Vaiho signed a 3-year deal with Djurgårdens IF.

On 10 February 2022, Vaiho joined Sirius on loan until mid-July 2022.

On 19 March 2024, Vaiho joined IFK Norrköping on a half-year long deal.

== Personal life ==
Vaiho was born 13 September 1988, in Stockholm, to Finnish parents. His mother is from Oulu and father from Pori. Vaiho is a fluent Finnish speaker.

== Honours ==
Djurgårdens IF

- Allsvenskan: 2019
- Svenska Cupen: 2017–18

Individual

- Årets Järnkamin: 2019
