= Fredrik Jensen (footballer, born 1985) =

Swedish footballer

Personal information
- Full name: Fredrik Jensen
- Date of birth: 13 June 1985 (age 41)
- Place of birth: Sweden
- Height: 1.83 m (6 ft 0 in)

Youth career
- Löberöds IF

Senior career*
Years	Team	Apps	(Gls)
–2005	Löberöds IF		
2006	Höörs IS		(28)
2007–2012	Trelleborgs FF	117	(32)
Total		117	(60)
- * Club domestic league appearances and goals

Fredrik Jensen (born 13 June 1985) is a Swedish former footballer who played the majority of his career for Trelleborgs FF as a forward. They signed him from Höörs IS in the Swedish sixth tier where he had scored 28 goals in one season. He became a playing coach during the later stages of his football career.
