= Boyd Mwila =

Zambian footballer (born 1984)

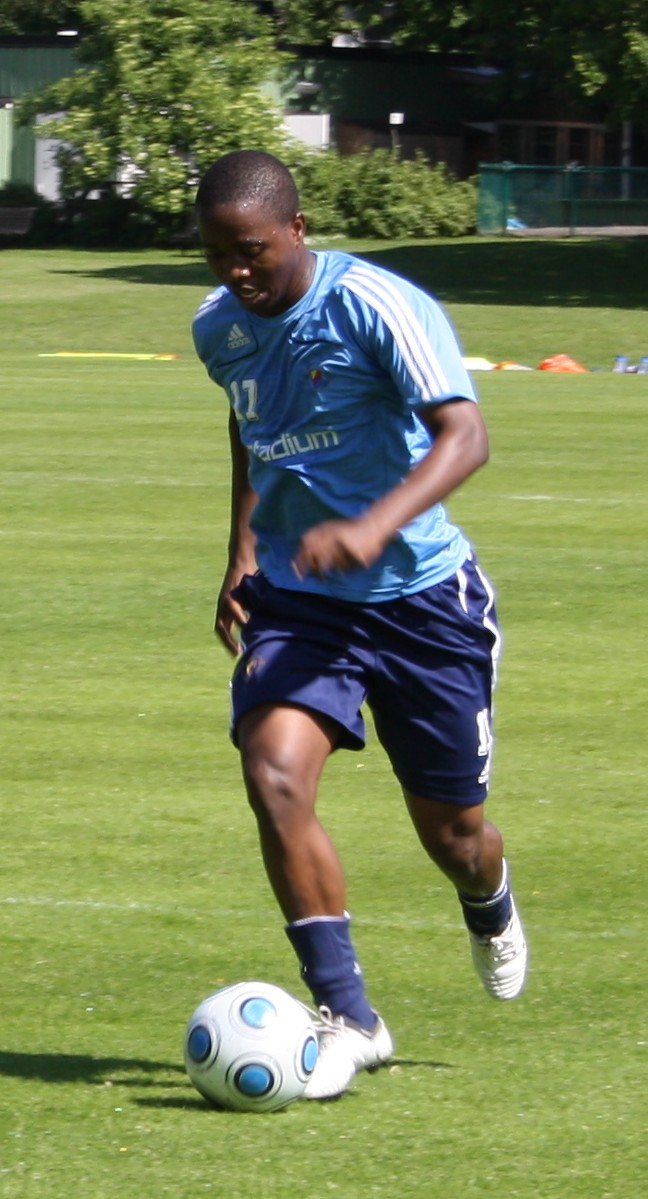

Personal information
- Date of birth: 28 July 1984 (age 42)
- Place of birth: Zambia
- Height: 1.74 m (5 ft 9 in)
- Position: Striker

Team information
- Current team: Vänersborgs FK
- Number: 2

Senior career*
Years	Team	Apps	(Gls)
2001–2002	Chiparamba Great Eagles		
2003–2009	Örgryte IS	112	(23)
2009–2011	Djurgårdens IF	19	(2)
2010–2011	→ FC Trollhättan (loan)	42	(8)
2012	FC Trollhättan	8	(1)
2012–2014	Vänersborgs FK	34	(23)

International career^{‡}
2004–2005	Zambia	6	(0)
- * Club domestic league appearances and goals as of November 25, 2013 ‡ National team caps and goals as of April 8, 2006

Boyd Mwila (born 28 July 1984) is a Zambian football striker who last played for FC Trollhättan. He has played for Chiparamba Great Eagles in Zambia and Örgryte, Djurgården and FC Trollhättan in Sweden. In March 2010 he was loaned out to Superettan club FC Trollhättan The loan was extended through the 2011 season in December 2010. The contract with Djurgården was ultimately terminated in November 2011.

After the termination of the contract Mwila sensationally signed with the division 4 team Vänersborgs FK in July 2012.
