= Johan Oremo =

Swedish footballer (born 1986)

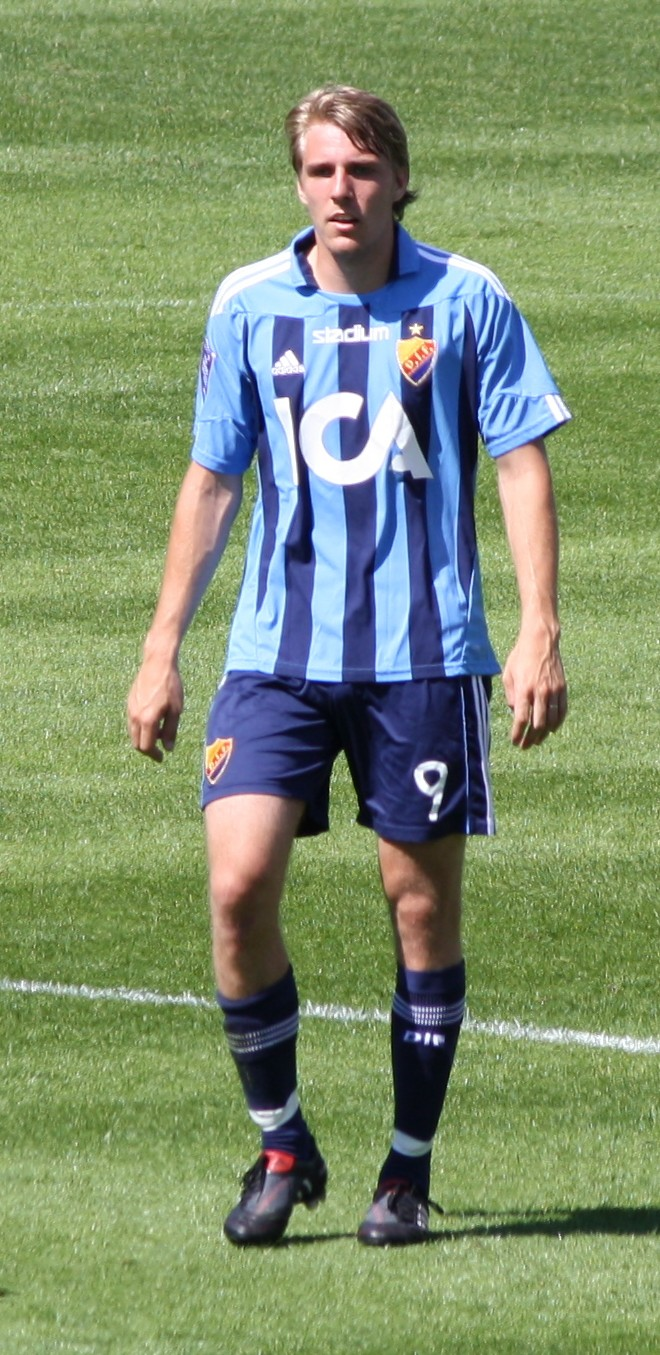

Personal information
- Date of birth: 24 October 1986 (age 40)
- Place of birth: Söderhamn, Sweden
- Height: 1.86 m (6 ft 1 in)
- Position: Forward

Team information
- Current team: Ängelholms FF
- Number: 15

Senior career*
Years	Team	Apps	(Gls)
2005	Rengsjö SK	22	(37)
2006	Bollnäs GIF	12	(12)
2006–2007	Söderhamns FF	12	(13)
2007–2008	Gefle IF	36	(15)
2008–2011	Djurgårdens IF	59	(7)
2012–2017	Gefle IF	136	(40)
2017–2019	Halmstads BK	34	(9)
2020	Wigry Suwałki	3	(0)
2020–2022	Ängelholms FF	63	(40)
2023–	Ängelholms FF	15	(8)

International career
2006–2009	Sweden U21	15	(1)
2008	Sweden	2	(0)
- * Club domestic league appearances and goals as of 24 October 2024

Johan Oremo (born 24 October 1986) is a Swedish footballer who plays as a forward for Ängelholms FF. He has won two caps for the Sweden national team.

== Club career ==
Oremo started his career at Söderhamns FF in the Swedish football Division 3 before moving to Gefle IF in 2007. During his first season in Gefle he scored 11 goals in Allsvenskan. After the season, Oremo was connected with other Swedish clubs but he decided to stay in Gefle. On 3 July 2008 Oremo signed a 4 1/2-year contract with Djurgårdens IF. He went on to score 3 league goals for Djurgården during the second half of the 2008 season.

Despite receiving a substantial amount of playing time, Oremo failed to score even once during the season of 2009. In September 2009, he sustained a foot injury. In February 2012, he re-signed with Gefle. He has since made 59 appearances and scored 11 goals.

== International career ==
Oremo's début in the Sweden national team was against Costa Rica on 13 January 2008. He went in for Rade Prica in the 68th minute.

== Career statistics ==
As of 6 December 2014

Appearances and goals by club, season and competition
Club	Season	League			Svenska Cupen		Continental		Total	
Club	Season	Division	Apps	Goals	Apps	Goals	Apps	Goals	Apps	Goals
Rengsjö SK	2005	Division 4	22	37	—		—		22	37
Bollnäs GIF	2006	Division 3	12	12	—		—		12	12
Söderhamns FF	2006	Division 3	12	13	—		—		12	13
Gefle IF	2007	Allsvenskan	24	11	—		—		24	11
Gefle IF	2008	Allsvenskan	12	4	—		—		12	4
Djurgårdens IF	2008	Allsvenskan	14	3	—		4	1	18	4
Djurgårdens IF	2009	Allsvenskan	14	0	1	0	—		15	0
Djurgårdens IF	2010	Allsvenskan	23	3	—		—		23	3
Djurgårdens IF	2011	Allsvenskan	8	1	—		—		8	1
Gefle IF	2012	Allsvenskan	21	1	—		—		21	1
Gefle IF	2013	Allsvenskan	27	8	4	1	6	2	37	11
Gefle IF	2014	Allsvenskan	26	8	3	1	—		29	9
Career total			215	102	8	2	10	3	233	107

== Honours ==
Individual

- Swedish Newcomer of the Year: 2007
