= Prince Ikpe Ekong =

Nigerian footballer (born 1978)

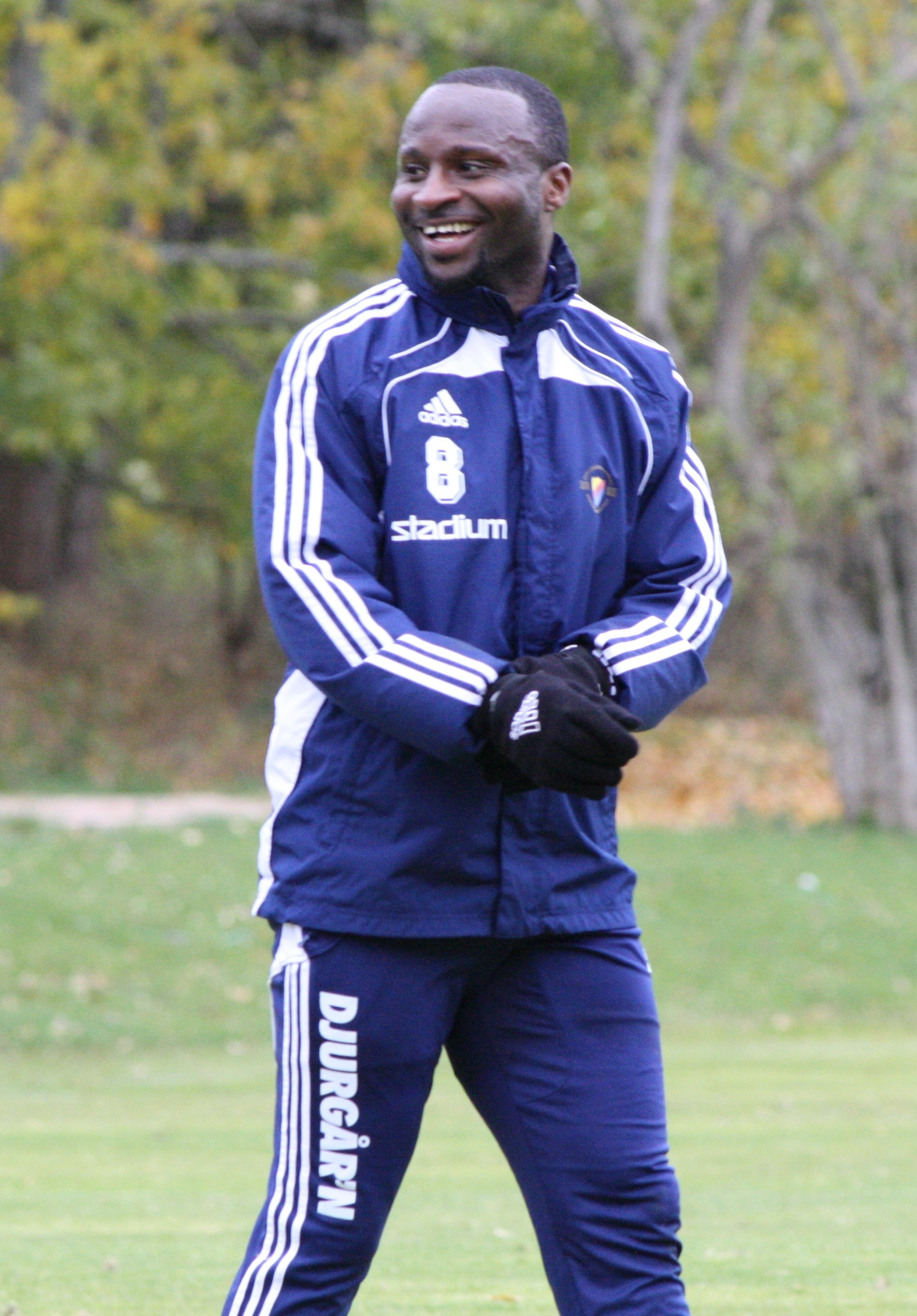

Personal information
- Date of birth: 5 October 1978 (age 48)
- Place of birth: Lagos, Nigeria
- Height: 1.79 m (5 ft 10 in)
- Position: Midfielder

Senior career*
| Years | Team | Apps | (Gls) |
| 1995 | Julius Berger Feeders | | |
| 1995–2003 | Reggiana | 63 | (1) |
| 1995–1996 | → Koper (loan) | 16 | (0) |
| 1996–1998 | → Tecos UAG (loan) | | |
| 1998–1999 | → AC Bellinzona (loan) | | |
| 1999–2000 | → UTA Arad (loan) | | |
| 2003–2004 | Shenyang Ginde | 43 | (1) |
| 2005 | Xiamen Lanshi | 21 | (5) |
| 2006–2008 | GAIS | 46 | (1) |
| 2008–2011 | Djurgårdens IF | 53 | (3) |
| 2012–2013 | Väsby United | 23 | (1) |

International career^{‡}
| 2001–2004 | Nigeria | 21 | (0) |
- * Club domestic league appearances and goals as of 5 December 2012 ‡ National team caps and goals as of 28 April 2011

Prince Ikpe Ekong (born 5 October 1978) is a Nigerian former professional footballer who played as a midfielder. He is best remembered for representing Reggiana, Shenyang Ginde, Xiamen Lanshi, GAIS, and Djurgårdens IF during his career. A full international between 2001 and 2004, he won 21 total caps for the Nigeria national team and was part of the 2004 African Cup of Nations where Nigeria finished third.

== Club career ==
After the 1994 World Cup a series of Nigerian players was brought to the European top leagues, and Ikpe Ekong was signed by Italian club Reggiana, then coached by Carlo Ancelotti.

=== Reggiana ===
Due to Italian rules regarding non-EU players, he could not play for the first team in Serie A, he ended up going on a loan to FC Koper from Slovenia, when he returned to Italy he was loaned out again to Tecos UAG of Mexico, then AC Bellinzona from Switzerland and FCM UTA from Romania. It would not be until 2000 when Prince Ikpe Ekong returned to Italy to play for A.C. Reggiana. However Reggiana had fallen to Serie where no non-EU players were allowed, and this led to Ikpe Ekong filing a lawsuit against the Italian FA, which he won, allowing him to play in the Italian league Serie.

=== Allsvenskan ===
In 2003, he moved to China and Changsha Ginde and later Xiamen Lanshi. In 2006 four clubs were interested in signing him because of his midfield talent in a defending and playmaker, French club CS Sedan, Maccabi Tel Aviv from Israel, Gençlerbirliğ from Turkey and GAIS from Sweden. He chose GAIS after he visited the club and then visited a local church where he heard God tell him to settled in Sweden, it was more than football. In 2008, he left GAIS to sign for Allsvenskan rivals Djurgårdens IF, one of the biggest team In Sweden, a rich team. He was bought out of his contract with Djurgården in November 2011 after losing interest as a full-time professional player, he was studying in sports management and sports phycologist, he also studied theology, Doctor of ministry (D.min) . In 2016, Prince played for Märsta IK in the fifth tier of the Swedish Football League for fun and to keep fitness, he also help to start up a div 7 team, Afrikans FC Stockholm, he scored so many goals, took the team from div 7, to div 4. system.

== International career ==
Ekong played nine international games for Nigeria between 2001 and 2004, and played in two games at the 2004 African Cup of Nations where Nigeria finished third.

== Personal life ==
Ekong is the father of professional footballer Emmanuel Ekong.

== Honours ==
Xiamen Lanshi Third place in AFCON African Cup Of Nations 2004, 3rd Place.

- China League One: 2005
