= Philip Hellquist =

Swedish footballer

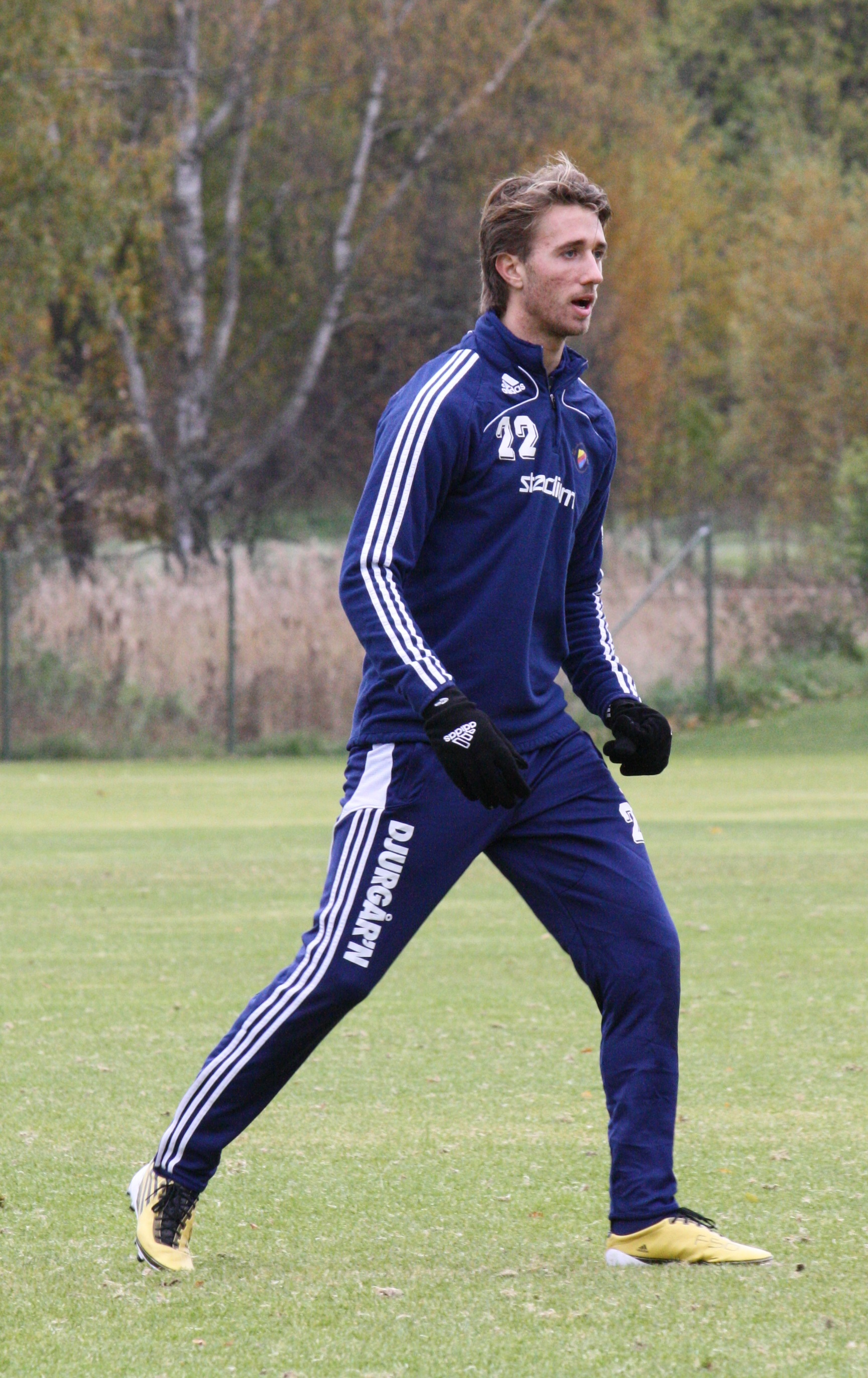
- Hellquist training with Djurgårdens IF in 2010

Personal information
- Full name: Philip Nikola Björn Hellquist
- Date of birth: 21 May 1991 (age 35)
- Place of birth: Stockholm, Sweden
- Height: 1.86 m (6 ft 1 in)
- Position: Forward

Team information
- Current team: Täby FK
- Number: 15

Youth career
- 1997–2008: Djurgårdens IF

Senior career*
Years	Team	Apps	(Gls)
2008–2014	Djurgårdens IF	98	(10)
2009	→ Vasalunds IF (loan)	1	(0)
2013	→ Assyriska FF (loan)	8	(0)
2015	SC Wiener Neustadt	12	(4)
2015–2017	Wolfsberger AC	45	(5)
2017	Kalmar FF	9	(1)
2018	PAS Giannina	7	(0)
2018–2019	Brommapojkarna	33	(12)
2020	Chungnam Asan	15	(4)
2021	KuPS	2	(0)
2021	→ KuFu-98	1	(1)
2021–2022	Brommapojkarna	30	(6)
2023–	Täby FK	39	(7)

International career
2007–2008	Sweden U17	4	(1)
2009–2010	Sweden U19	6	(1)
2011	Sweden U21	4	(1)
- * Club domestic league appearances and goals as of 1 January 2025

Philip Hellquist (born 21 May 1991) is a Swedish professional footballer who plays as a forward for Ettan club Täby FK.

== Career ==
Hellquist grew up in the Stockholm suburb Kista, and began playing football in Djurgården's youth team at the age of five. He was named for the Swedish U17 national team in a friendly against Latvia in April 2007. The game was his debut in any of the Swedish national teams, and he also scored the last goal in the 6–0 victory. He drew attention from English club Arsenal, which offered him a place in their U17-team. No transfer was made due to a hip injury. Hellquist also had a trial at Birmingham City and Italian club Empoli showed interest in him. He began playing with the senior team during the 2008 pre-season. He played his first game in Svenska Cupen in the 4–2 loss against IK Sirius, and also scored his first goal in the Cup. Hellquist made his Allsvenskan debut on 2 July 2008 against Elfsborg as a substitute. Djurgården awarded him "Junior player of the year" for his achievements during the 2008 season. He extended his contract with Djurgården for an additional three years in March 2010.

On 15 January 2014, he signed a contract with Austrian team SC Wiener Neustadt.

On 9 June 2015, he signed a contract with Austrian team Wolfsberger AC.

On 7 August 2017, he signed a six months contract with Swedish team Kalmar.

On 9 February 2018, he signed a contract with Greek team PAS Giannina.

In March 2021, he joined Kuopion Palloseura (KuPS) in Finnish Veikkausliiga.

On 10 August 2021, Hellquist returned to Brommapojkarna and signed a contract until the end of 2022.

In January 2023, he signed with Ettan club Täby FK.

== Career statistics ==
Club statistics
Club	Season	League			Cup		Europe		Total	
Club	Season	Division	Apps	Goals	Apps	Goals	Apps	Goals	Apps	Goals
Djurgården	2008	Allsvenskan	8	0	2	1	0	0	10	1
Djurgården	2009	Allsvenskan	11	0	2	1	—	—	13	1
Djurgården	Total		19	0	4	2	0	0	23	2
Vasalunds IF (loan)	2009	Superettan	1	0	0	0	—	—	1	0
Djurgården	2010	Allsvenskan	24	3	1	0	—	—	25	3
Djurgården	2011	Allsvenskan	26	4	2	0	—	—	28	4
Djurgården	2012	Allsvenskan	11	1	0	0	—	—	11	1
Djurgården	Total		61	8	3	0	0	0	64	8
Assyriska FF (loan)	2013	Superettan	8	0	4	1	—	—	12	1
Djurgården	2014	Allsvenskan	18	2	1	0	—	—	19	2
SC Wiener Neustadt	2014–15	Austrian Bundesliga	12	4	0	0	0	0	12	4
Wolfsberger AC	2015–16	Austrian Bundesliga	26	1	2	0	2	1	30	2
Wolfsberger AC	2016–17	Austrian Bundesliga	19	4	1	0	0	0	20	4
Wolfsberger AC	Total		45	5	3	0	2	1	50	6
Kalmar	2017	Allsvenskan	9	1	0	0	–		9	1
PAS Giannina	2017–18	Super League Greece 2	7	0	0	0	–		7	0
Brommapojkarna	2018	Allsvenskan	19	5	–		–		19	5
Brommapojkarna	2019	Superettan	16	7	–		–		16	7
Brommapojkarna	Total		35	12	0	0	0	0	35	12
Chungnam Asan	2020	K League 2	15	4	–		–		15	4
KuPS	2021	Veikkausliiga	2	0	0	0	0	0	2	0
KuFu-98	2021	Kakkonen	1	1	–		–		1	1
Brommapojkarna	2021	Ettan	9	1	–		–		9	1
Brommapojkarna	2022	Superettan	21	5	2	0	–		23	5
Brommapojkarna	Total		30	6	2	0	0	0	32	6
Täby FK	2023	Ettan	24	6	1	0	–		25	6
Täby FK	2024	Ettan	15	1	1	0	–		16	1
Täby FK	Total		39	7	2	0	0	0	41	7
Career total			302	50	19	3	2	1	323	54
