= Christer Youssef =

Swedish footballer

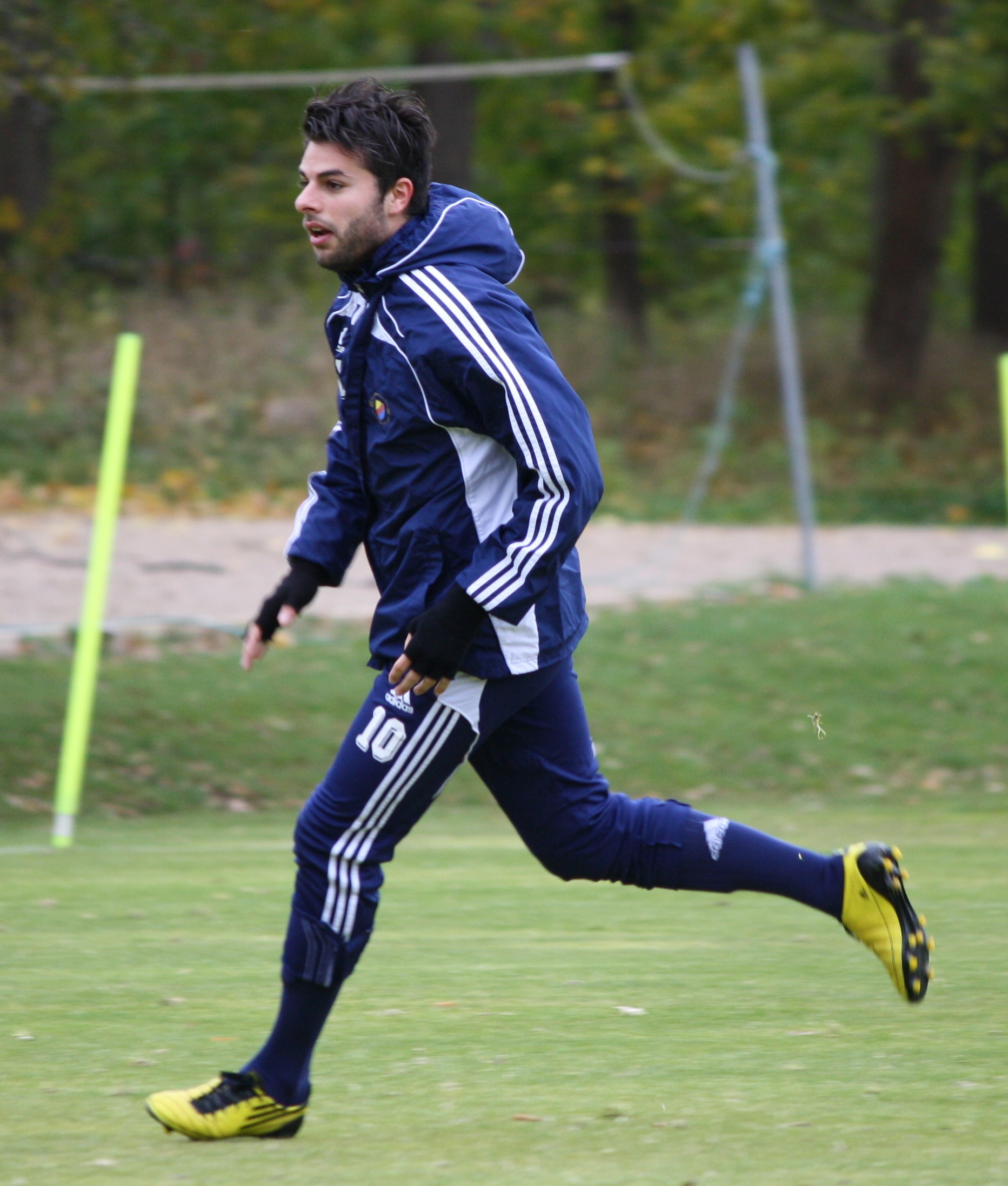

Personal information
- Date of birth: 1 December 1987 (age 38)
- Place of birth: Tensta, Stockholm, Sweden
- Height: 1.77 m (5 ft 10 in)
- Position: Midfielder

Youth career
- Spånga IS
- Bromstens IK

Senior career*
Years	Team	Apps	(Gls)
2006–2009	IF Brommapojkarna	55	(7)
2009–2013	Djurgårdens IF	75	(10)
2012	→ Assyriska FF (loan)	14	(4)
2013	Assyriska FF	27	(6)
2014	Aris Limassol	16	(7)
2015	Assyriska FF	20	(6)
2016	Hansa Rostock	6	(0)
2016–2018	Aris Limassol	46	(6)
2019	Nongbua Pitchaya	17	(6)
2020	Assyriska IK	0	(0)

International career
2007–2009	Sweden U21	4	(0)
- * Club domestic league appearances and goals

Christer Youssef (Arabic: كريستر يوسف; born 1 December 1987) is a Swedish former professional footballer who played as a midfielder.
