= Trimi Makolli =

Swedish footballer

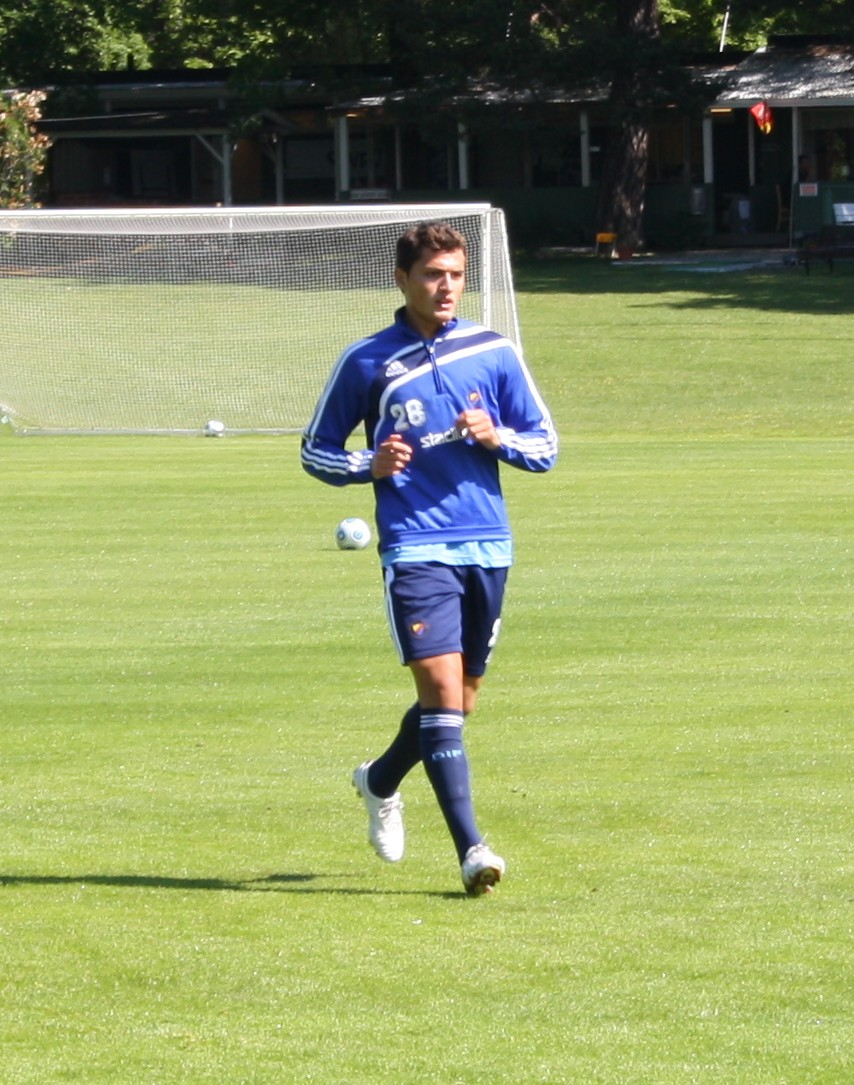

Personal information
- Full name: Ljeutrim Makolli
- Date of birth: 7 June 1992 (age 34)
- Place of birth: Pristina, FR Yugoslavia
- Height: 1.77 m (5 ft 9 1/2 in)
- Position: Forward

Youth career
- 2003–2009: Djurgårdens IF

Senior career*
Years	Team	Apps	(Gls)
2009–2013	Djurgårdens IF	2	(0)
2010	→ Vasalunds IF (loan)	4	(0)
2012–2013	→ IK Frej (loan)	34	(8)
2014	Valsta Syrianska IK	26	(2)
2015–2016	IFK Österåker		
2017–2019	IFK Stocksund	57	(45)
2020	IFK Österåker	5	(0)
2021–	FC Stockholm Internazionale	27	(16)

International career^{‡}
2008–2009	Sweden U17	11	(2)
- * Club domestic league appearances and goals as of 24 November 2013 ‡ National team caps and goals as of 12:21, 31 July 2012 (UTC)

Ljeutrim "Trimi" Makolli (Serbian: Љеутрим Маколи, Ljeutrim Makoli; born 7 June 1992) is a footballer who played as a forward. Born in Yugoslavia, he represented Sweden at youth level.

Makolli debuted for Djurgårdens IF in a friendly match against IK Sirius on 12 February 2009 and also scored a goal in the match. He made his Allsvenskan debut on 24 April 2009 as a substitute against IF Brommapojkarna. In total he played 2 league games and 3 cup games for Djurgården.
