= Kjell Frisk =

Swedish footballer

Personal information
- Date of birth: 27 April 1964 (age 62)
- Height: 1.84 m (6 ft 0 in)
- Position: Goalkeeper

Senior career*
Years	Team	Apps	(Gls)
1987–1989	Åtvidabergs FF		
1990–1995	Djurgårdens IF	67	(0)
2001–2002	Djurgårdens IF	0	(0)
- * Club domestic league appearances and goals

Kjell Göran Frisk (born 27 April 1964) is a Swedish former professional footballer who played as a goalkeeper, and a goalkeeping coach. Frisk made 24 Allsvenskan appearances for Djurgården.

From 1999 to 2016, Frisk was the goalkeeping coach of Djurgården. Together with Lars Sandberg, he was awarded the Swedish Sports Confederation Fair-play Award in 2006.
