= Patrik Haginge =

Swedish footballer (born 1985)

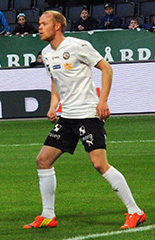

Personal information
- Full name: Nils Patrik Haginge
- Date of birth: 2 April 1985 (age 41)
- Place of birth: Örebro, Sweden
- Height: 1.83 m (6 ft 0 in)
- Position: Defender

Team information
- Current team: Örebro SK (manager)

Youth career
- Mellringe/Ekers IF
- 2001–2002: Örebro SK

Senior career*
Years	Team	Apps	(Gls)
–2001	Mellringe/Ekers IF		
2003–2008	Örebro SK	89	(6)
2008–2010	Djurgårdens IF	53	(3)
2011–2017	Örebro SK	137	(6)
2018-2020	IFK Örebro	34	(8)
2021-2023	IF Eker Örebro	28	(6)
2023	Ervalla SK	2	(0)

International career
2003	Sweden U19	12	(0)
2004	Sweden U21	4	(0)

Managerial career
- 2024–2025: Örebro SK (youth)
- 2025: Örebro SK (caretaker)
- 2025–2026: Örebro SK (assistant)
- 2026–: Örebro SK
- * Club domestic league appearances and goals

Nils Patrik Haginge (born 2 April 1985) is a Swedish former professional footballer who played as a defender.

== Club career ==
Haginge started his career at Mellringe-Ekers IF and played there until 2001 when he moved to Örebro SK. He made his Allsvenskan debut against Landskrona BoIS on 18 April 2004. After seven seasons and 89 appearances for Örebro, Haginge moved to Djurgårdens IF during the summer 2008. On 3 February 2011 Patrik signed a contract with his old team Örebro SK after playing 53 games for Djurgården. He retired from professional football in 2017.

== International career ==
He won twelve caps for the Sweden U19 team and four caps for the Sweden U21 team between the years 2003 and 2004.

== Managerial career ==
Haginge became U19 coach of Örebro SK in 2024. In May 2025 he took over as first-team coached after Streten Kenic was sacked. However, Haginge lacked the pro licence to hold the managerial role, and Bernhard Nilsson took over, ostensibly as a figurehead. Rikard Norling served as manager in 2026, but when he was sacked too, Haginge took over again, in October 2026.
