= Yosif Ayuba =

Swedish footballer of Beninese descent

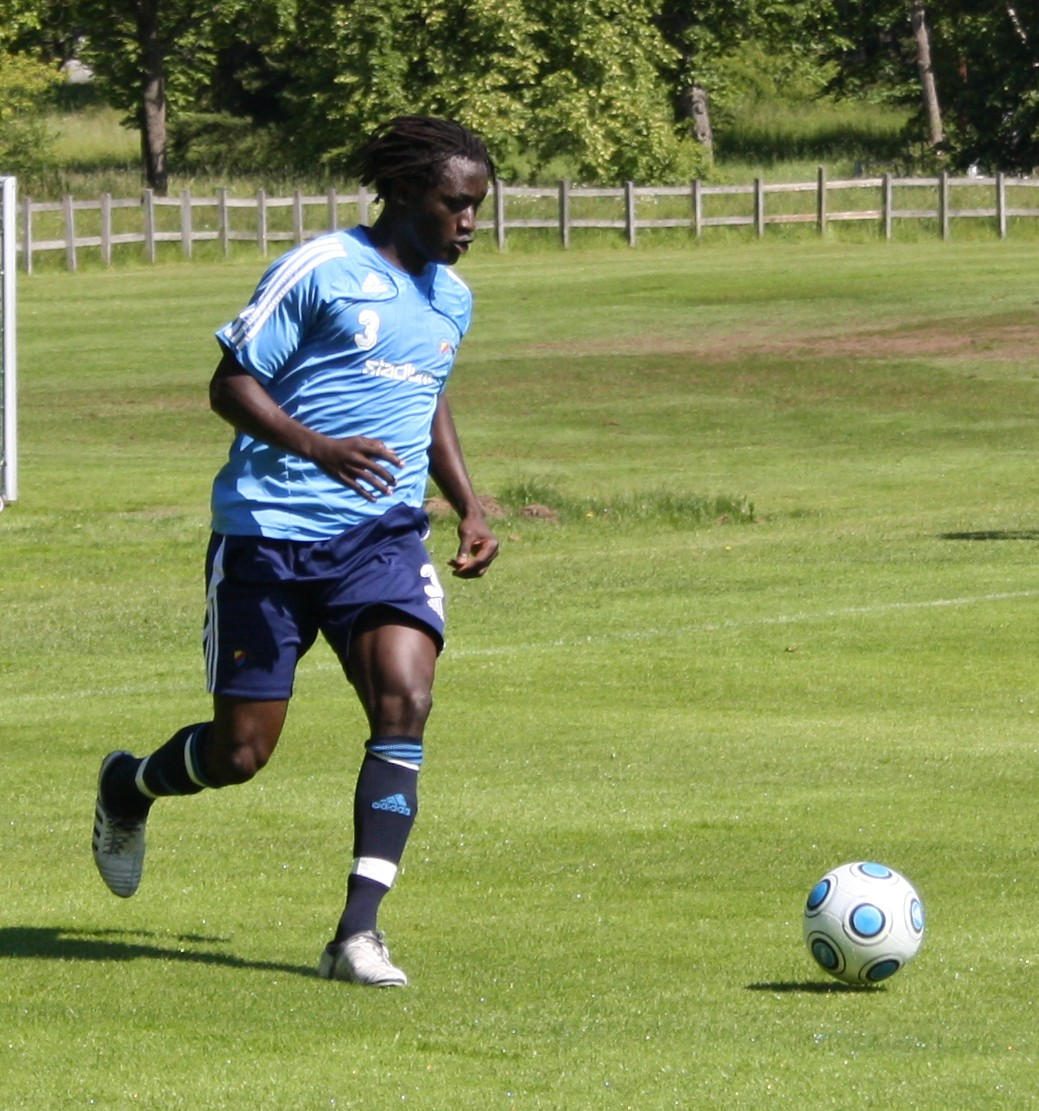
- Yosif Ayuba during practice

Personal information
- Full name: Yosif Ayuba
- Date of birth: 30 November 1990 (age 35)
- Place of birth: Parakou, Benin
- Height: 1.73 m (5 ft 8 in)
- Positions: Defender; midfielder

Team information
- Current team: Huddinge IF

Senior career*
Years	Team	Apps	(Gls)
2008–2009	Vasalunds IF	32	(1)
2009–2013	Djurgårdens IF	15	(1)
2010	→ Vasalunds IF (loan)	13	(0)
2012	→ AFC United (loan)	22	(0)
2014–2015	Skellefteå FF	19	(2)
2015–	Huddinge IF		
- * Club domestic league appearances and goals as of 4 January 2016

Yosif Ayuba (born 30 November 1990) is a Swedish footballer of Beninese descent who plays as a defender and midfielder. He plays for Huddinge IF.

== Career ==
Ayuba came from Vasalunds IF to Djurgårdens IF in June 2009 and debuted against Helsingborgs IF on 5 July. He started to play organized football in 2007, when he came to Sweden from Benin. He scored his first goal in Allsvenskan on 28 October away against Helsingborgs IF. In January 2011, Ayuba suffered a blood clot in one of his calves, which put him in rehab for at least six months.
