= Bosön =

Sports venue in Lidingö, Stockholm, Sweden

Coordinates: 59°22′52″N 18°10′53″E

Bosön is a sports complex on Lidingö outside Stockholm in Sweden, and the headquarters for the Swedish Sports Confederation. Several Swedish national teams have annual training camps at Bosön.
