= 2008 Djurgårdens IF season =

Djurgården
2008 season
- Chairman: Bo Lundquist
- Manager: Siggi Jónsson
- Stadium: Stockholms Stadion
- Allsvenskan: 12th
- Svenska Cupen: 3rd round
- 2008–09 UEFA Cup: 2nd qualifying round
- Top goalscorer: League: Sebastian Rajalakso (7); All: Jones Kusi-Asare & Sebastian Rajalakso (7)
- Highest home attendance: 22,312 (24 September vs AIK, Allsvenskan)
- Lowest home attendance: 5,012 (5 October vs GIF Sundsvall, Allsvenskan)

Djurgården will in the 2008 season compete in the Allsvenskan, Svenska Cupen and UEFA Cup

Djurgården started the season with 9 matches without a defeat. With many injuries on key players, such as old Swedish international Mattias Jonson, Finnish legend Aki Riihilahti and new Finnish star Daniel Sjölund, and bad playing Djurgården ended 12th, their worst season since 1999. The new 20-year-old from Enköpings SK, Sebastian Rajalakso scored most goals.

== Squad ==
As of July 2, 2008. Note: Flags indicate national team as defined under FIFA eligibility rules; some limited exceptions apply. Players may hold more than one non-FIFA nationality.

| No. | Pos. | Nation | Player |
|---|---|---|---|
| 2 | MF | (Sweden) SWE | Philip Hellqvist |
| 4 | DF | (Sweden) SWE | Patrik Haginge |
| 6 | DF | (Finland) FIN | Toni Kuivasto (vice-captain) |
| 7 | MF | (Nigeria) NGA | Prince Ikpe Ekong |
| 8 | DF | (Germany) GER | Jan Tauer |
| 9 | FW | (Sweden) SWE | Jones Kusi-Asare |
| 10 | MF | (Brazil) BRA | Enrico Cardoso Nazaré |
| 11 | FW | (Finland) FIN | Daniel Sjölund |
| 12 | FW | (Sweden) SWE | Mattias Jonson (vice-captain) |
| 14 | DF | (Sweden) SWE | Kebba Ceesay |
| 15 | GK | (The Gambia) GAM | Pa Dembo Touray |
| 16 | DF | (Sweden) SWE | Markus Johannesson (captain) |

| No. | Pos. | Nation | Player |
|---|---|---|---|
| 18 | FW | (Sweden) SWE | Mikael Dahlberg |
| 19 | FW | (Brazil) BRA | Thiago Quirino da Silva |
| 20 | MF | (Sweden) SWE | Martin Andersson |
| 21 | FW | (Sweden) SWE | Kristian Junegard |
| 22 | MF | (Slovenia) SVN | Andrej Komac |
| 23 | MF | (South Africa) RSA | Lance Davids |
| 24 | DF | (Sweden) SWE | Peter Magnusson |
| 25 | MF | (Sweden) SWE | Sebastian Rajalakso |
| 27 | FW | (Sweden) SWE | Johan Oremo |
| 28 | MF | (Sweden) SWE | Kristoffer Näfver (on loan from Örebro SK) |
| 29 | MF | (Finland) FIN | Aki Riihilahti |
| 30 | GK | (Sweden) SWE | Oskar Wahlström |

=== Out on loan ===
Note: Flags indicate national team as defined under FIFA eligibility rules; some limited exceptions apply. Players may hold more than one non-FIFA nationality.

| No. | Pos. | Nation | Player |
|---|---|---|---|
| 4 | DF | (Sweden) SWE | Dennis Boskailo (on loan to Falkenbergs FF) |
| 3 | DF | (Sweden) SWE | Robert Stoltz (on loan to Enköpings SK) |
| 13 | DF | (Sweden) SWE | Per Johansson (on loan to Örebro SK) |
| 24 | MF | (Sweden) SWE | Christoffer Karlsson (on loan to Åtvidabergs FF) |
| 17 | FW | (Sweden) SWE | Stefan Batan (on loan to Assyriska FF) |

== Transfers ==
=== Players in ===
| Date | No. | Player | From | Comments | Link |
|---|---|---|---|---|---|
| 2008-01-01 | 25 | (Sweden) Sebastian Rajalakso | (Sweden) Enköpings SK | | |
| 2008-01-01 | 20 | (Sweden) Martin Andersson | (Sweden) Enköpings SK | | |
| 2008-01-01 | 13 | (Sweden) Per Johansson | (Sweden) BK Forward | Back from loan | |
| 2008-03-31 | 26 | (Serbia) Nebojša Marinković | (Serbia) FK Partizan | Loan | |
| 2008-06-17 | 4 | (Sweden) Patrik Haginge | (Sweden) Örebro SK | | |
| 2008-06-27 | 7 | (Nigeria) Prince Ikpe Ekong | (Sweden) GAIS | | |
| 2008-07-01 | 24 | (Sweden) Peter Magnusson | (Sweden) Vasalund | | |
| 2008-07-03 | 27 | (Sweden) Johan Oremo | (Sweden) Gefle IF | | |
| 2008-07-29 | 28 | (Sweden) Kristoffer Näfver | (Sweden) Örebro SK | Loan | |

=== Players out ===
| Date | No. | Player | To | Comments | Link |
|---|---|---|---|---|---|
| 2007-11-30 | 7 | (Sweden) Johan Arneng | (Norway) Aalesunds FK | | |
| 2007-01-01 | 27 | (Switzerland) Feliciano Magro | (Sweden) IFK Norrköping | | |
| 2008-01-08 | 20 | (Sweden) Patrick Amoah | (Spain) Ciudad de Lorquí | | |
| 2008-01-01 | 25 | (Sweden) Eldin Kozica | | End of contract | |
| 2008-02-08 | 4 | (Sweden) Dennis Boskailo | (Sweden) Falkenbergs FF | Loan | |
| 2008-02-25 | 3 | (Sweden) Robert Stoltz | (Sweden) Enköpings SK | Loan | |
| 2008-02-26 | 35 | (Sweden) Tommi Vaiho | (Sweden) IK Frej | Loan | |
| 2008-06-13 | 5 | (Iceland) Sölvi Ottesen | (Denmark) SønderjyskE | | |
| 2008-07-02 | 26 | (Serbia) Nebojša Marinković | (Serbia) FK Partizan | End of Loan | |
| 2008-07-29 | 13 | (Sweden) Per Johansson | (Sweden) Örebro SK | Loan | |
| 2008-07-31 | 17 | (Sweden) Stefan Batan | (Sweden) Assyriska FF | Loan | |

== Club ==
=== Coaching staff ===
| Position | Staff |
|---|---|
| Manager | (Iceland) Sigurður Jónsson |
| Assistant manager | (Finland) Paul Lindholm |
| Goalkeeping coach | (Sweden) Kjell Frisk |
| Fitness coach | (Iceland) Palmar Hreinsson |

Last updated: 26 July
Source: Djurgårdens IF

=== Kit ===
Supplier: Adidas
Sponsor(s): ICA

| Home 2008 | Away 2008 |

=== Other information ===
| Chairman | (Sweden) Bo Lundquist |
| Sport director | (Sweden) Bo Andersson |
| Ground (capacity and dimensions) | Stockholm Stadion (14 417 / 105x70 m) |

Updated to match played 26 July
Source: Djurgårdens IF and Stockholm Stadion

== Player statistics ==
Appearances for competitive matches only

| No. | Pos | Nat | Player | Total | | Allsvenskan | | Svenska Cupen | | 2008–09 UEFA Cup | |
| No. | Pos | Nat | Player | Apps | Goals | Apps | Goals | Apps | Goals | Apps | Goals |
|---|---|---|---|---|---|---|---|---|---|---|---|
| 2 | | (Sweden) SWE | Philip Hellquist | 9 | 1 | 7 | 0 | 2 | 1 | 0 | 0 |
| 3 | | (Sweden) SWE | Robert Stoltz | 1 | 0 | 0 | 0 | 0 | 0 | 1 | 0 |
| 4 | | (Sweden) SWE | Patrik Haginge | 21 | 0 | 17 | 0 | 0 | 0 | 4 | 0 |
| 5 | | (Iceland) ISL | Sölvi Ottesen | 10 | 3 | 9 | 2 | 1 | 1 | 0 | 0 |
| 6 | | (Finland) FIN | Toni Kuivasto | 28 | 0 | 24 | 0 | 1 | 0 | 3 | 0 |
| 7 | | (Nigeria) NGA | Prince Ikpe Ekong | 18 | 1 | 14 | 0 | 0 | 0 | 4 | 1 |
| 8 | | (Germany) GER | Jan Tauer | 26 | 1 | 22 | 1 | 1 | 0 | 3 | 0 |
| 9 | | (Sweden) SWE | Jones Kusi-Asare | 35 | 7 | 29 | 6 | 2 | 1 | 4 | 0 |
| 10 | | (Brazil) BRA | Enrico Cardoso Nazaré | 28 | 4 | 22 | 2 | 2 | 0 | 4 | 2 |
| 11 | | (Finland) FIN | Daniel Sjölund | 13 | 1 | 10 | 1 | 0 | 0 | 3 | 0 |
| 12 | | (Sweden) SWE | Mattias Jonson | 14 | 2 | 14 | 2 | 0 | 0 | 0 | 0 |
| 13 | | (Sweden) SWE | Per Johansson | 6 | 0 | 4 | 0 | 2 | 0 | 0 | 0 |
| 14 | | (The Gambia) GAM | Kebba Ceesay | 9 | 0 | 7 | 0 | 1 | 0 | 1 | 0 |
| 15 | | (The Gambia) GAM | Pa Dembo Touray | 29 | 0 | 23 | 0 | 2 | 0 | 4 | 0 |
| 16 | | (Sweden) SWE | Markus Johannesson | 30 | 0 | 26 | 0 | 1 | 0 | 3 | 0 |
| 17 | | (Sweden) SWE | Stefan Batan | 11 | 1 | 9 | 0 | 2 | 1 | 0 | 0 |
| 18 | | (Sweden) SWE | Mikael Dahlberg | 31 | 2 | 27 | 2 | 0 | 0 | 4 | 0 |
| 19 | | (Brazil) BRA | Thiago Quirino da Silva | 26 | 4 | 22 | 2 | 2 | 2 | 2 | 0 |
| 20 | | (Sweden) SWE | Martin Andersson | 14 | 0 | 13 | 0 | 1 | 0 | 0 | 0 |
| 22 | | (Slovenia) SVN | Andrej Komac | 31 | 3 | 26 | 2 | 1 | 1 | 4 | 0 |
| 23 | | (South Africa) RSA | Lance Davids | 28 | 0 | 24 | 0 | 0 | 0 | 4 | 0 |
| 24 | | (Sweden) SWE | Peter Magnusson | 12 | 0 | 11 | 0 | 0 | 0 | 1 | 0 |
| 25 | | (Sweden) SWE | Sebastian Rajalakso | 29 | 7 | 27 | 7 | 0 | 0 | 2 | 0 |
| 26 | | (Serbia) SRB | Nebojsa Marinkovic | 5 | 1 | 3 | 0 | 2 | 1 | 0 | 0 |
| 27 | | (Sweden) SWE | Johan Oremo | 18 | 4 | 14 | 3 | 0 | 0 | 4 | 1 |
| 28 | | (Sweden) SWE | Kristoffer Näfver | 5 | 0 | 5 | 0 | 0 | 0 | 0 | 0 |
| 29 | | (Finland) FIN | Aki Riihilahti | 2 | 0 | 2 | 0 | 0 | 0 | 0 | 0 |
| 30 | | (Sweden) SWE | Oskar Wahlström | 8 | 0 | 8 | 0 | 0 | 0 | 0 | 0 |
| | | (Sweden) SWE | Robbin Sellin | 2 | 1 | 0 | 0 | 2 | 1 | 0 | 0 |
| | | (Sweden) SWE | August Bergman | 1 | 1 | 0 | 0 | 1 | 1 | 0 | 0 |
| | | (Sweden) SWE | Tobias Forsberg | 1 | 1 | 0 | 0 | 1 | 1 | 0 | 0 |
| | | (The Gambia) GAM | Yanbuka Ceesay | 1 | 0 | 0 | 0 | 1 | 0 | 0 | 0 |

=== Goals ===
==== Total ====
| Scorer | Goals |
|---|---|
| (Sweden) Sebastian Rajalakso | 7 |
| (Sweden) Jones Kusi-Asare | 7 |
| (Sweden) Johan Oremo | 4 |
| (Brazil) Enrico Cardoso Nazaré | 4 |
| (Brazil) Thiago Quirino da Silva | 4 |
| (Slovenia) Andrej Komac | 3 |
| (Iceland) Sölvi Ottesen | 3 |
| (Sweden) Mattias Jonson | 2 |
| (Sweden) Mikael Dahlberg | 2 |
| (Finland) Daniel Sjölund | 1 |
| (Germany) Jan Tauer | 1 |
| (Nigeria) Prince Ikpe Ekong | 1 |
| (Sweden) Stefan Batan | 1 |
| (Sweden) August Bergman | 1 |
| (Sweden) Tobias Forsberg | 1 |
| (Sweden) Philip Hellquist | 1 |
| (Serbia) Nebojša Marinković | 1 |
| (Sweden) Robbin Sellin | 1 |

==== Allsvenskan ====
| Scorer | Goals |
|---|---|
| (Sweden) Sebastian Rajalakso | 7 |
| (Sweden) Jones Kusi-Asare | 6 |
| (Sweden) Johan Oremo | 3 |
| (Sweden) Mattias Jonson | 2 |
| (Brazil) Enrico Cardoso Nazaré | 2 |
| (Brazil) Thiago Quirino da Silva | 2 |
| (Sweden) Mikael Dahlberg | 2 |
| (Slovenia) Andrej Komac | 2 |
| (Iceland) Sölvi Ottesen | 2 |
| (Finland) Daniel Sjölund | 1 |
| (Germany) Jan Tauer | 1 |

==== Svenska Cupen ====
| Scorer | Goals |
|---|---|
| (Brazil) Thiago Quirino da Silva | 2 |
| (Sweden) Stefan Batan | 1 |
| (Sweden) August Bergman | 1 |
| (Sweden) Tobias Forsberg | 1 |
| (Sweden) Philip Hellquist | 1 |
| (Slovenia) Andrej Komac | 1 |
| (Sweden) Jones Kusi-Asare | 1 |
| (Serbia) Nebojša Marinković | 1 |
| (Iceland) Sölvi Ottesen | 1 |
| (Sweden) Robbin Sellin | 1 |

==== UEFA Cup ====
| Scorer | Goals |
|---|---|
| (Brazil) Enrico Cardoso Nazaré | 2 |
| (Sweden) Johan Oremo | 1 |
| (Nigeria) Prince Ikpe Ekong | 1 |

== Competitions ==
=== Allsvenskan ===
| Pos | Team | Pld | W | D | L | GF | GA | GD | Pts | Qualification or relegation |
|---|---|---|---|---|---|---|---|---|---|---|
| 10 | Trelleborgs FF | 30 | 9 | 13 | 8 | 33 | 31 | +2 | 40 | |
| 11 | GAIS | 30 | 9 | 11 | 10 | 30 | 36 | −6 | 38 | |
| 12 | Djurgårdens IF | 30 | 9 | 9 | 12 | 30 | 41 | −11 | 36 | |
| 13 | Gefle IF | 30 | 7 | 7 | 16 | 33 | 42 | −9 | 28 | |
| 14 | Ljungskile SK (R) | 30 | 6 | 6 | 18 | 23 | 52 | −29 | 24 | Qualification to Relegation play-offs |

Source: svenskfotboll.se (in Swedish)
Rules for classification: 1) points; 2) goal difference; 3) number of goals scored.
(R) Relegated

==== Matches ====
Results for Djurgårdens IF for season 2008.

NOTE: scores are written DIF first

| Date | Venue | Opponents | Score | Comp | TV | Djurgården scorers | Attendance |
|---|---|---|---|---|---|---|---|
| 2008-03-30 | Idrottsparken | Norrköping | 2–1 | Allsvenskan | Canal + | Dahlberg, Rajalakso | 15 651 |
| 2008-04-05 | Stadion | Malmö | 1–1 | Allsvenskan | TV4 | Rajalakso | 13 379 |
| 2008-04-09 | Strömvallen | Gefle | 2–1 | Allsvenskan | PPV | Rajalakso, Kusi-Asare | 4 328 |
| 2008-04-13 | Stadion | Halmstad | 2–1 | Allsvenskan | PPV | Rajalakso, Ottesen | 8 947 |
| 2008-04-16 | Behrn Arena | Örebro | 1–1 | Allsvenskan | TV4 Sport | Rajalakso | 10 195 |
| 2008-04-21 | Stadion | GAIS | 0–0 | Allsvenskan | PPV | | 9 237 |
| 2008-04-24 | Råsunda | AIK | 1–1 | Allsvenskan | Canal + | Quirino | 34 173 |
| 2008-04-28 | Stadion | Ljungskile | 2–1 | Allsvenskan | PPV | Jonson, Ottesen | 8 915 |
| 2008-05-04 | Norrporten Arena | Sundsvall | 0–0 | Allsvenskan | PPV | | 5 047 |
| 2008-05-07 | Råsunda (H) | Hammarby | 0–2 | Allsvenskan | Canal + | | 20 346 |
| 2008-05-10 | Fredriksskans | Kalmar | 1–5 | Allsvenskan | TV4 | Kusi-Asare | 7 668 |
| 2008-07-02 | Stadion | Elfsborg | 0–2 | Allsvenskan | Canal + | | 10 241 |
| 2008-07-06 | Vångavallen | Trelleborg | 1–1 | Allsvenskan | PPV | Jonson | 4 128 |
| 2008-07-12 | Råsunda (H) | Göteborg | 1–2 | Allsvenskan | TV4 | Tauer | 10 713 |
| 2008-07-21 | Olympia | Helsingborg | 0–2 | Allsvenskan | Canal + | | 12 737 |
| 2008-07-27 | Råsunda (H) | Helsingborg | 1–2 | Allsvenskan | PPV | Oremo | 10 114 |
| 2008-08-10 | Malmö Stadion | Malmö | 2–1 | Allsvenskan | PPV | Kusi-Asare, Sjölund | 10 052 |
| 2008-08-17 | Stadion | Gefle | 2–0 | Allsvenskan | PPV | Kusi-Asare, Enrico | 6 712 |
| 2008-08-24 | Örjans Vall | Halmstad | 2–1 | Allsvenskan | PPV | Dahlberg, Komac | 5 621 |
| 2008-09-01 | Stadion | Örebro | 0–0 | Allsvenskan | PPV | | 8 140 |
| 2008-09-15 | Ullevi | GAIS | 1–2 | Allsvenskan | PPV | Oremo | 3 060 |
| 2008-09-24 | Råsunda (H) | AIK | 1–1 | Allsvenskan | Canal + | Oremo | 22 312 |
| 2008-09-28 | Starke Arvid | Ljungskile | 1–0 | Allsvenskan | PPV | Kusi-Asare | 2 725 |
| 2008-10-02 | Stadion | Norrköping | 1–1 | Allsvenskan | TV4 Sport | Enrico | 5 332 |
| 2008-10-05 | Stadion | Sundsvall | 3–1 | Allsvenskan | PPV | Komac, Rajalakso, Quirino | 5 012 |
| 2008-10-20 | Råsunda | Hammarby | 0–3 | Allsvenskan | Canal + | | 12 483 |
| 2008-10-25 | Stadion | Kalmar | 0–1 | Allsvenskan | TV4 | | 7 823 |
| 2008-10-29 | Borås Arena | Elfsborg | 0–1 | Allsvenskan | Canal + | | 8 319 |
| 2008-11-01 | Ullevi | Göteborg | 1–3 | Allsvenskan | Canal + | Kusi-Asare | 8 070 |
| 2008-11-09 | Stadion | Trelleborg | 1–3 | Allsvenskan | None | Rajalakso | 5 300 |

=== Svenska Cupen ===
| Date | Venue | Opponents | Score | Comp | TV | Djurgården scorers | Attendance |
|---|---|---|---|---|---|---|---|
| 2008-05-01 | Stadsparksvallen | Råslätt | 9–0 | Svenska Cupen | None | Quirino(2), Kusi-Asare, Ottesen, Marinković, Bergman, Sellin, Forsberg | 1 281 |
| 2008-05-17 | Strömvallen | Sirius | 2–4 | Svenska Cupen | TV4 | Hellqvist, Komac | |

=== UEFA Cup ===
| Game | Date | Tournament | Round | Ground | Opponent | Score^{1} | TV | Report |
|---|---|---|---|---|---|---|---|---|
| 1 | 17 July | UEFA Cup | First qualifying round | HR | Flora (Estonia) | 0 – 0 | – | Report / Report link; Kick off / 19:00 CEST; Attendance / 5 386; Referee / (Luxembourg) Luc Wilmes |
| 2 | 31 July | UEFA Cup | First qualifying round | A (Estonia) | Flora (Estonia) | 2 – 2 | – | Report / Report link; Kick off / 17:45 EET; Attendance / 2 199; Referee / (Georgia (country)) Lasha Silagava; Flora / Djurgårdens IF; 81' Post; 82' Post / 23' Enrico; 55' Ekong |
| 3 | 14 August | UEFA Cup | Second qualifying round | HR | Rosenborg (Norway) | 2 – 1 | Viasat Sport | Report / Report link; Kick off / 19:00 CEST; Attendance / 6 947; Referee / (Scotland) Douglas McDonald; Djurgårdens IF / Rosenborg; 38' Oremo; 90' Enrico / 75' Sapara |
| 4 | 28 August | UEFA Cup | Second qualifying round | A (Norway) | Rosenborg (Norway) | 0 – 5 | TV2 Zebra (Norway) | Report / Report link; Kick off / 19:00 CEST; Referee / (Switzerland) Sascha Kever; Rosenborg / Djurgårdens IF; 43' Iversen; 58' Konan pen' (67) Iversen; (penalty scored) Skjelbred pen' (86) Iversen |

=== Friendlies ===
| Date | Venue | Opponents | Score | Comp | Time | Djurgården scorers | Attendance |
|---|---|---|---|---|---|---|---|
| 2008-02-09 | Stadshagen | BP | 2–0 | Friendly | 13:00 | Enrico, Dahlberg | 2 000 |
| 2008-02-16 | Södertälje | (Denmark) FC Copenhagen | 1–4 | Friendly | 13:00 | Kusi-Asare | 1 345 |
| 2008-02-23 | Behrn Arena | Örebro | 2–1 | Friendly | 15:00 | Dahlberg, Batan | 2 114 |
| 2008-02-27 | Årsta IP | Sirius | 1–2 | Friendly | 16:00 | Rajalakso | 725 |
| 2008-03-01 | Strömvallen | Gefle | 3–2 | Friendly | 13:30 | Dahlberg (2), Kusi-Asare | 498 |
| 2008-03-09 | Stadshagen | Enköping | 3–0 | Friendly | 13:00 | Kusi-Asare, Y Ceesay, Hellqvist | |
| 2008-03-12 | (Portugal) Browns Club | GAIS | 2–2 | Friendly | 17:00 | Kusi-Asare, Almerares | |
| 2008-03-19 | (Portugal) Alcochete | AIK | 0–2 | Friendly | 17:00 | | |
| 2008-03-24 | Stadshagen | (Finland) Mariehamn | 1–0 | Friendly | 15:00 | Kusi-Asare | 750 |
| 2008-06-13 | (Finland) Wiklöf Holding Arena | (Finland) Mariehamn | 2–3 | Friendly | 19:00 | Johannesson, Kusi-Asare | |
| 2008-06-13 | (Finland) Ratina Stadion | (Finland) Tampere United | 1–0 | Friendly | 17:30 | Hellqvist | |
| 2008-06-27 | Borgvallen, Hummelsta! | Örebro | 0–3 | Friendly | | | |
| 2008-10-15 | Kristinebergs IP | IK Frej | 1–0 | Friendly | 18:30 | Quirino | |

== Djurgården League Top Goalscorers/Assist in the Allsvenskan 2008 Season ==
Updated 10 November 2008

| Name | Matches | Goals |
|---|---|---|
| (Sweden) Sebastian Rajalakso | 27 | 7 |
| (Sweden) Jones Kusi-Asare | 29 | 6 |
| (Sweden) Johan Oremo | 14 | 3 |
| (Sweden) Mattias Jonson | 13 | 2 |
| (Brazil) Thiago Quirino da Silva | 22 | 2 |
| (Iceland) Sölvi Ottesen | 9 | 2 |
| (Slovenia) Andrej Komac | 26 | 2 |
| (Brazil) Enrico Cardoso Nazaré | 22 | 2 |
| (Sweden) Mikael Dahlberg | 27 | 2 |
| (Finland) Daniel Sjölund | 10 | 1 |
| (Germany) Jan Tauer | 22 | 1 |

| Name | Matches | Assists |
|---|---|---|
| (Brazil) Enrico Cardoso Nazaré | 22 | 4 |
| (Germany) Jan Tauer | 22 | 3 |
| (Sweden) Mikael Dahlberg | 27 | 3 |
| (Sweden) Patrik Haginge | 16 | 3 |
| (Sweden) Martin Andersson | 13 | 2 |
| (Sweden) Jones Kusi-Asare | 29 | 2 |
| (Slovenia) Andrej Komac | 26 | 2 |
| (Sweden) Johan Oremo | 14 | 1 |
| (Iceland) Sölvi Ottesen | 9 | 1 |
| (Finland) Daniel Sjölund | 10 | 1 |
| (Sweden) Markus Johannesson | 26 | 1 |

== Djurgården League Top Goalscorers/Assist in the UEFA Cup 2008–09 ==
| Name | Matches | Goals |
|---|---|---|
| (Brazil) Enrico Cardoso Nazaré | 4 | 2 |
| (Sweden) Johan Oremo | 4 | 1 |
| (Nigeria) Prince Ikpe Ekong | 4 | 1 |

| Name | Matches | Assists |
|---|---|---|
| (Nigeria) Prince Ikpe Ekong | 4 | 2 |
| (Sweden) Mikael Dahlberg | 4 | 2 |
