= 2007 Djurgårdens IF season =

Djurgården
2007 season
- Chairman: Bo Lundquist
- Manager: Siggi Jónsson
- Stadium: Stockholms Stadion
- Allsvenskan: 3rd
- Svenska Cupen: 3rd round
- Top goalscorer: League: Quirino (8); All: Quirino (8)
- Highest home attendance: 32,529 (29 May vs AIK, Allsvenskan)
- Lowest home attendance: 9,311 (28 July vs Örebro SK, Allsvenskan)

Djurgården will in the 2007 season compete in Allsvenskan and Swedish Cup.

The gold medal was a battle between Djurgården and IFK Göteborg. Since Djurgården lost last round against Brommapojkarna and Göteborg beat Trelleborgs FF, Göteborg was the new champion. Kalmar FF won their last match, and took the second place from Djurgården.

== Squad ==
Note: Flags indicate national team as defined under FIFA eligibility rules; some limited exceptions apply. Players may hold more than one non-FIFA nationality.

No.	Pos.	Nation	Player
3	DF	(Sweden) SWE	Robert Stoltz
5	DF	(Iceland) ISL	Sölvi Ottesen
6	DF	(Finland) FIN	Toni Kuivasto (vice-captain)
7	MF	(Sweden) SWE	Johan Arneng
8	DF	(Germany) GER	Jan Tauer
9	FW	(Sweden) SWE	Jones Kusi-Asare
10	MF	(Brazil) BRA	Enrico
11	FW	(Finland) FIN	Daniel Sjölund
12	FW	(Sweden) SWE	Mattias Jonson (vice-captain)
14	DF	(Sweden) SWE	Kebba Ceesay
15	GK	(The Gambia) GAM	Pa Dembo Touray
16	DF	(Sweden) SWE	Markus Johannesson (captain)

No.	Pos.	Nation	Player
17	FW	(Sweden) SWE	Stefan Batan
18	FW	(Sweden) SWE	Mikael Dahlberg
19	FW	(Brazil) BRA	Quirino
20	FW	(Sweden) SWE	Patrick Amoah
21	FW	(Sweden) SWE	Kristian Junegard
22	MF	(Slovenia) SVN	Andrej Komac
23	MF	(South Africa) RSA	Lance Davids
24	MF	(Sweden) SWE	Christoffer Karlsson
25	DF	(Sweden) SWE	Eldin Kozica
29	MF	(Finland) FIN	Aki Riihilahti
30	GK	(Sweden) SWE	Oskar Wahlström

== Player statistics ==
Appearances for competitive matches only

No.	Pos	Nat	Player	Total		Allsvenskan		Svenska Cupen	
No.	Pos	Nat	Player	Apps	Goals	Apps	Goals	Apps	Goals
2		(Sweden) SWE	Matias Concha	11	0	11	0	0	0
3		(Sweden) SWE	Robert Stoltz	8	1	7	1	1	0
5		(Iceland) ISL	Sölvi Ottesen	15	1	14	0	1	1
6		(Finland) FIN	Toni Kuivasto	28	1	26	1	2	0
7		(Sweden) SWE	Johan Arneng	24	1	22	1	2	0
8		(Germany) GER	Jan Tauer	24	1	23	1	1	0
9		(Sweden) SWE	Jones Kusi-Asare	24	5	23	4	1	1
10		(Brazil) BRA	Enrico Cardoso Nazaré	27	5	25	5	2	0
11		(Sweden) SWE	Daniel Sjölund	24	5	23	5	1	0
12		(Sweden) SWE	Mattias Jonson	16	5	16	5	0	0
14		(The Gambia) GAM	Kebba Ceesay	6	0	4	0	2	0
15		(The Gambia) GAM	Pa Dembo Touray	26	0	26	0	0	0
16		(Sweden) SWE	Markus Johannesson	27	0	25	0	2	0
17		(Sweden) SWE	Stefan Batan	15	0	13	0	2	0
18		(Sweden) SWE	Mikael Dahlberg	21	6	19	4	2	2
19		(Brazil) BRA	Thiago Quirino da Silva	15	8	13	8	2	0
20		(Sweden) SWE	Patrick Amoah	15	1	13	1	2	0
22		(Slovenia) SVN	Andrej Komac	25	1	23	1	2	0
23		(South Africa) RSA	Lance Davids	22	1	22	1	0	0
24		(Sweden) SWE	Christoffer Karlsson	1	0	0	0	1	0
26		(Nigeria) NGA	Kennedy Igboananike	2	0	2	0	0	0
27		(Switzerland) SUI	Felix Magro	3	0	3	0	0	0
29		(Finland) FIN	Aki Riihilahti	10	0	10	0	0	0
30		(Sweden) SWE	Oskar Wahlström	2	0	0	0	2	0

=== Goals ===
==== Total ====
Scorer	Goals
(Brazil) Quirino	8
(Sweden) Mikael Dahlberg	6
(Brazil) Enrico	5
(Sweden) Mattias Jonson	5
(Finland) Daniel Sjölund	5
(Sweden) Jones Kusi-Asare	5
(Sweden) Patrick Amoah	1
(Sweden) Robert Stoltz	1
(Sweden) Johan Arneng	1
(South Africa) Lance Davids	1
(Slovenia) Andrej Komac	1
(Finland) Toni Kuivasto	1
(Germany) Jan Tauer	1
(Iceland) Sölvi Ottesen	1

==== Allsvenskan ====
Scorer	Goals
(Brazil) Quirino	8
(Brazil) Enrico	5
(Sweden) Mattias Jonson	5
(Finland) Daniel Sjölund	5
(Sweden) Jones Kusi-Asare	4
(Sweden) Mikael Dahlberg	4
(Sweden) Patrick Amoah	1
(Sweden) Robert Stoltz	1
(Sweden) Johan Arneng	1
(South Africa) Lance Davids	1
(Slovenia) Andrej Komac	1
(Finland) Toni Kuivasto	1
(Germany) Jan Tauer	1

==== Svenska Cupen ====
Scorer	Goals
(Sweden) Mikael Dahlberg	2
(Sweden) Jones Kusi-Asare	1
(Iceland) Sölvi Ottesen	1

== Competitions ==
=== Allsvenskan ===
Pos	Team	Pld	W	D	L	GF	GA	GD	Pts	Qualification or relegation
1	IFK Göteborg (C)	26	14	7	5	45	23	+22	49	Qualification to Champions League first qualifying round
2	Kalmar FF	26	15	3	8	43	32	+11	48	Qualification to UEFA Cup first qualifying round
3	Djurgårdens IF	26	13	7	6	39	24	+15	46	Qualification to UEFA Cup first qualifying round
4	IF Elfsborg	26	10	10	6	39	30	+9	40	Qualification to Intertoto Cup first round
5	AIK	26	10	8	8	30	27	+3	38	

Source: svenskfotboll.se (in Swedish)
Rules for classification: 1) points; 2) goal difference; 3) number of goals scored.
(C) Champions

==== Matches ====
Results for Djurgårdens IF for season 2007.

NOTE: scores are written DIF first

Date	Venue	Opponents	Score	Comp	TV	Djurgården scorers	Attendance
2007-04-07	Råsunda	BP	0–1	Allsv.	Canal+		15 092
2007-04-16	Stadion	Halmstad	2–0	Allsv.	Säsongskortet	Kusi Asare, Dahlberg	10 747
2007-04-21	Stadion	Helsingborg	3–1	Allsv.	TV4	Jonson(2), Kusi Asare	11 223
2007-04-29	Fredriksskans	Kalmar	0–1	Allsv.	Säsongskortet		7 349
2007-05-07	Borås Arena	Elfsborg	2–2	Allsv.	Säsongskortet	Stoltz, Dahlberg	11 533
2007-05-14	Stadion	GAIS	0–1	Allsv.	Säsongskortet		10 122
2007-05-21	Vångavallen	Trelleborg	3–0	Allsv.	Säsongskortet	OG, Enrico, Amoah	3 012
2007-05-28	Råsunda	AIK	3–1	Allsv.	Canal+	Sjölund(2), Enrico	32 529
2007-06-12	Stadion	Göteborg	2–1	Allsv.	Säsongskortet	Tauer, Komac	12 697
2007-06-19	Råsunda	Hammarby	0–2	Allsv.	Canal+		23 545
2007-06-25	Behrn Arena	Örebro	0–0	Allsv.	Säsongskortet		11 565
2007-07-02	Stadion	Gefle	2–1	Allsv.	Säsongskortet	Enrico(2)	12 030
2007-07-07	Stadion	Malmö	1–0	Allsv.	Säsongskortet	Kusi Asare	11 515
2007-07-17	Malmö Stadion	Malmö	1–1	Allsv.	Canal+	Davids	15 976
2007-07-21	Stadion	Elfsborg	2–1	Allsv.	Säsongskortet	Quirino, Kuivasto	11 733
2007-08-06	Nya Ullevi	GAIS	1–1	Allsv.	Säsongskortet	Sjölund	6 453
2007-08-13	Råsunda	Hammarby	1–0	Allsv.	Canal+	Dahlberg	24 634
2007-08-16	Nya Ullevi	Göteborg	1–1	Allsv.	Canal+	Jonson	12 187
2007-08-27	Stadion	Kalmar	1–3	Allsv.	Säsongskortet	Sjölund	13 387
2007-09-03	Olympia	Helsingborg	4–1	Allsv.	Säsongskortet	Quirino(2), Sjölund, Dahlberg	13 385
2007-09-17	Stadion	Trelleborg	1–1	Allsv.	Säsongskortet	Jonson	9 700
2007-09-24	Råsunda	AIK	1–1	Allsv.	Canal+	Quirino	34 116
2007-09-29	Stadion	Örebro	4–1	Allsv.	TV4	Arneng, Jonson, Kusi Asare, Quirino	9 311
2007-10-07	Strömvallen	Gefle	2–0	Allsv.	Säsongskortet	Quirino, Enrico	7 130
2007-10-22	Örjans Vall	Halmstad	2–1	Allsv.	Säsongskortet	Quirino (2)	7 147
2007-10-28	Stadion	BP	0–1	Allsv.	Canal+		14 222

=== Svenska Cupen ===
Date	Venue	Opponents	Score	Comp	TV	Djurgården scorers	Attendance
2007-04-26	Borås Arena	Norrby IF	2–0	Svenska Cupen	None	Dahlberg, Ottesen	628
2007-05-17	Strömvallen	Gefle IF	1–1^{[I]}	Svenska Cupen	TV4	Kusi Asare, Dahlberg	1 335

- I The result was 1–1 after full-time, and 2–2 after overtime. The game had to be decided on penalties which Gefle won with 7–5.
