= Sölvi Ottesen =

Icelandic footballer

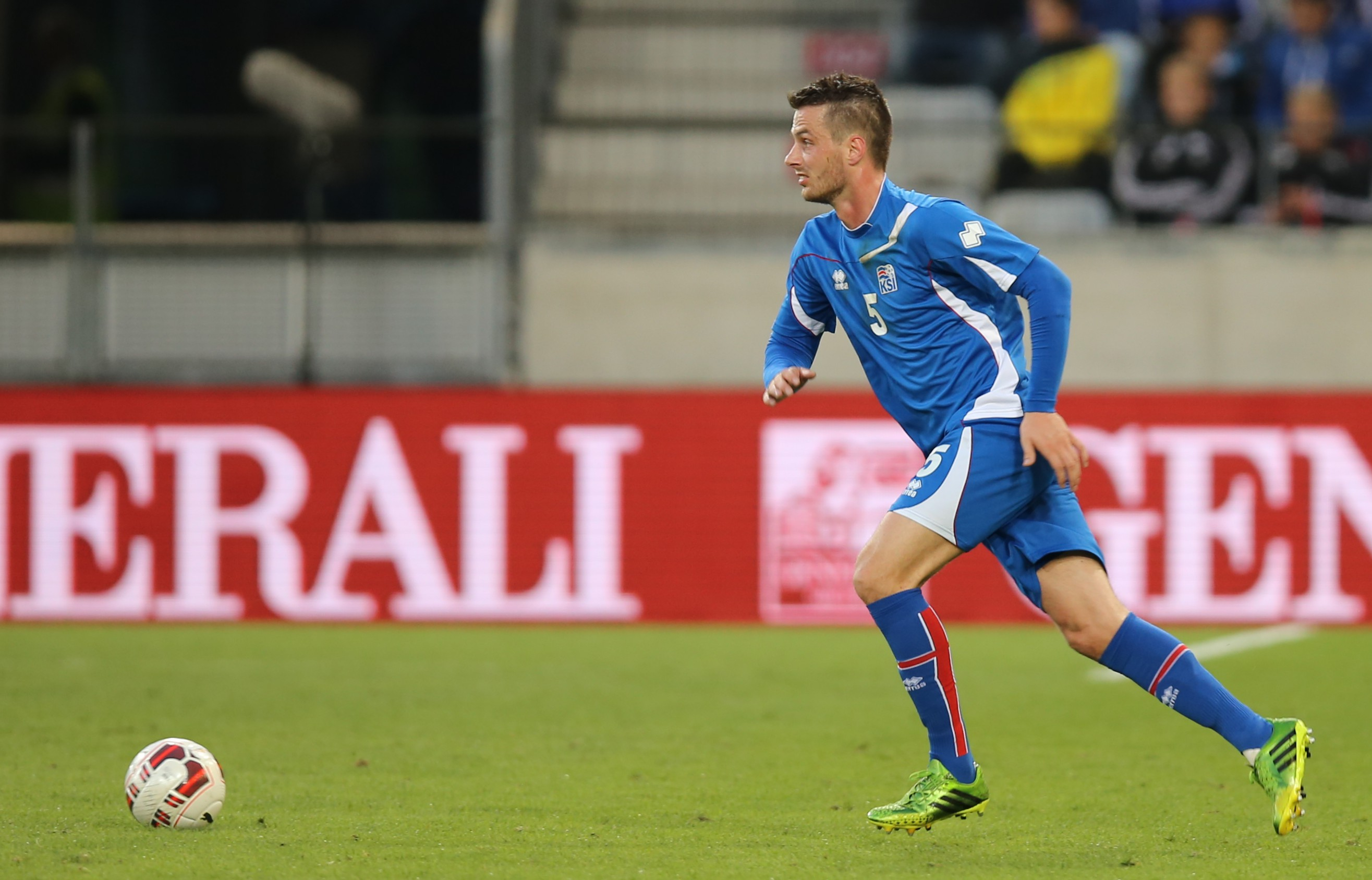
- Sölvi Ottesen at an Austria–Iceland match in 2014.

Personal information
- Full name: Sölvi Geir Ottesen Jónsson
- Date of birth: 18 February 1984 (age 42)
- Place of birth: Reykjavík, Iceland
- Height: 1.89 m (6 ft 2 in)
- Position: Centre back

Team information
- Current team: Vikingur Reykjavík (manager)

Youth career
- 2000: Víkingur Reykjavík

Senior career*
Years	Team	Apps	(Gls)
2001–2004	Víkingur Reykjavík	36	(0)
2004–2008	Djurgården	35	(2)
2008–2010	SønderjyskE	54	(6)
2010–2013	Copenhagen	43	(8)
2013–2015	Ural	33	(0)
2015	Jiangsu Sainty	26	(3)
2016	Wuhan Zall	24	(3)
2017	Buriram United	12	(1)
2017	Guangzhou R&F	5	(1)
2018–2021	Víkingur Reykjavík	57	(4)
Total		278	(24)

International career
2004–2006	Iceland U21	11	(0)
2005–2016	Iceland	28	(0)

Managerial career
- 2025–: Vikingur Reykjavík
- * Club domestic league appearances and goals

Sölvi Geir Ottesen Jónsson (born 18 February 1984) is an Icelandic professional football manager and former player who played as a centre back; he earned 28 caps for the Iceland national football team. He is currently the manager of Icelandic team Vikingur Reykjavík.

Sölvi is among the most decorated Icelandic professional footballers ever. In his professional career, Sölvi picked up seven titles. In Sweden, he won the Allsvenskan and the Svenska Cupen on two occasions. In Denmark he won the Superliga twice and the Cup. As he moved to Asia he helped Jiangsu Sainty to win the Chinese FA Cup. He also played a part with Buriram United as they won the Thai League 1.

== Club career ==
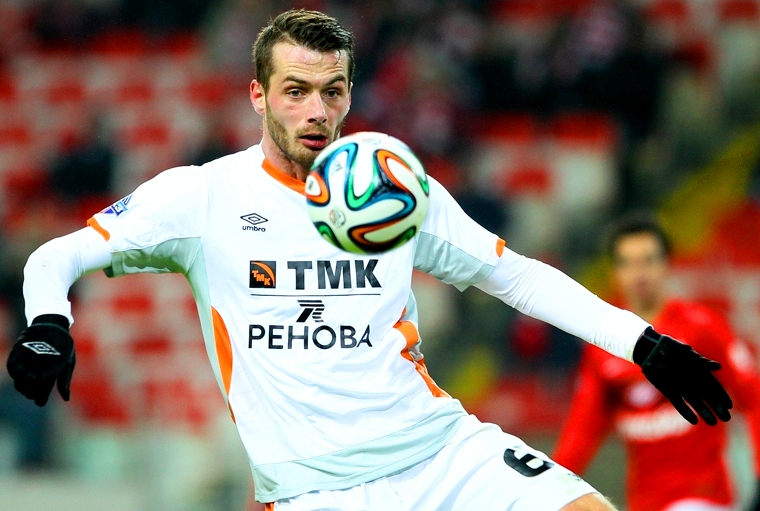
Ottesen playing for Ural.

=== Early career ===
Born in Reykjavík, Sölvi started his career at Vikingur Reykjavík, where he came through the academy. After progressing the ranks of the youth team, he made his Vikingur Reykjavík debut as an 84th-minute substitute, in a 7–2 win over KS on 25 August 2001. Ottesen went on to make four appearances for the side at the end of the 2001 season. The following 2002 season saw his first team opportunities increased, making a total of ten appearances.

The 2003 season saw Ottesen continuing to establish himself in the starting eleven for Vikingur Reykjavík. He went on to make eighteen appearances for the side at the end of the 2003 season. His performance saw him being named 1. deild karla's Team of the Year. Despite signing a three–year contract with for Vikingur Reykjavík, Ottesen was linked with a move away with the club, with Norwegian side Brann and Football League Second Division side Barnsley were interested in signing him.

Despite suffering from an injury, Ottesen was a first team regular until July 2004, where he made eight appearances for the side. By the time he departed from the club, Ottesen made 32 appearances in the heart of defence for Vikingur between years 2001 and 2004, spurring interest from abroad.

=== Djurgården ===
Sölvi signed for Swedish side Djurgården on 10 July 2004, signing a four-and-a-half-year contract with the club. Upon joining the club, he said the move would help him develop.

However, Ottesen suffered a setback when he suffered an injury. On 21 August 2004 Ottesen was an unused substitute, in a 1–0 win over Örgryte. He made his Djurgården debut, starting the whole game, in a 2–0 loss against Malmö on 20 September 2004. Ottesen appeared three more times, all coming on as a substitute. He later helped Djurgården win the Svenska Cupen with them in his first year as a professional after beating IFK Göteborg 3–1 in the final. At the end of the 2004 season, Ottesen went on to make four appearances for the side.

At the start of the 2005 season, Ottesen was expecting to compete with Elias Storm over the centre–back position. However, he suffered a groin injury during the pre–season and was sidelined for several months. By May, Ottesen made his recovery from his groin injury. On 13 June 2005 he made his first appearance of the season, starting the whole match, in a 0–0 draw against IFK Göteborg. However, Ottesen appeared in the remaining matches of the 2005 season at the substitute bench. On 4 August 2005 he played in a 2–2 draw against Hammarby. Although Ottesen made two appearances for the side in the 2005, he was part of the squad that won both the Allsvenskan and Cupen. Shortly after, Ottesen was sidelined for six to eight months after injuring his knee during a friendly match against Väsby United.

In the 2006 season, Ottesen continue to be rehabilitated his knee since the start of the season. By mid–July, he returned to full training, though his knee hadn't yet fully recovered. On 28 August 2006 made his return from a knee injury, starting the whole game, in a 3–0 win over Hammarby. Since returning to the first team, he went on to make five more appearances for the side at the end of the 2006 season.

In the 2007 season, Ottesen continued to be in a competition over the centre–back position with Toni Kuivasto, Markus Johannesson and Kebba Ceesay. He scored his first goal for the club in a Swedish Cup, in a 2–0 win over Norrby on 27 April 2007. Despite being sidelined at the beginning of May, he began to play regularly for the side by the end of the month. However, Ottesen suffered an injury that resulted in him sidelined for two months. But he made his return to the first team in the last game of the season, coming on as a late substitute, in a 1–0 loss against IF Brommapojkarna. Ottesen made fourteen appearances and scoring once this season.

Ahead of the 2008 season, Ottesen was sidelined with a knee injury that kept him out between three and four weeks. But he returned and started the season, as he found himself in and out of the starting line-up for the side. On 14 April 2008 he scored his first Djurgården goal, in a 2–1 win over Halmstad. His second goal for the side came on 28 April 2008, in a 2–1 win over Ljungskile. By the time he departed Djurgården, Sölvi made thirty–six appearances and scoring three times in all competitions.

=== SønderjyskE ===
Following his spell in Sweden, Sölvi signed a three-year contract with SønderjyskE of the Danish Superliga in the summer of 2008. The move was reportedly cost "close to one million DKK. Swedish kronor - about 800,000 kr".

Ottesen made his SønderjyskE debut, starting the whole game, in a 2–0 loss against AC Horsens in the opening game of the season. In a 1–1 draw against FC Copenhagen on 4 August 2008, Ottesen started the whole match, as his performance earned him a Man of the Match by Ekstrabladet. In a follow–up match against Vejle on 11 August 2008, setting up the club's opening goal of the game, in a 2–1 loss. He scored his first goal for the club, in a 2–1 loss against Aalborg three weeks later on 31 August 2008. Since joining the club, Ottesen quickly established himself in the starting eleven, playing in the centre–back position. On 8 April 2009 he scored his second goal of the season, in a 2–1 loss against F.C. Copenhagen. Ottesen later scored two more goals against Odense BK and Esbjerg, win against them saw SønderjyskE avoid relegation. Despite being sidelined on five occasions during the 2008–09 season, he went on to make twenty–seven appearances and scoring four times in all competitions.

Ahead of his second season with SønderjyskE, a report suggested that he would soon go on trial with Scottish giants Glasgow Celtic. Icelandic newspaper Fréttablaðið stated that he had been invited to train with during pre-season with a view to a deal subject to permission from his then current club, SønderjyskE. But he stayed at SønderjyskE for the second season. At the start of the 2009–10 season, Ottesen appeared in the opening game of the season against Randers, starting the whole game and keeping a clean sheet, as SønderjyskE won 1–0. However, he suffered a knee injury that saw him sidelined for two matches. On 9 August 2009 Ottesen returned from injury, starting the whole game, in a 1–0 loss against FC Copenhagen. Since returning to the first team from injury, he regained his first team place for the side. His performance saw him named Player of the Month. As the season went by, SønderjyskE was in financial problems, leading him to be linked away from the club. Despite this, Ottesen stayed at the club for the remaining matches of the 2009–10 season. Ottesen scored his first goal of the season, in a 1–1 draw against Brøndby on 7 March 2010. He then captained the side for the first time, starting the whole game, in a 2–0 against FC Copenhagen on 21 March 2010. Despite suffering from an injury later in the 2009–10 season, Ottesen was able to return to the first team and scored his second goal of the season, in a 2–0 win over Odense BK on 3 May 2010. Following another successful relegation battle to stay in the top division, he went on to make twenty–nine appearances and scoring two times in all competitions.

It was announced on 18 March 2010 that he will leave the club at the end of the 2009–10 season, regardless of the club's future in the top division. Six years after departing the club, Ottesen was inducted to Sønderjyske's Hall of Fame.

=== Copenhagen ===
As the deal with Glasgow Celtic failed to materialize, Ottesen signed a three-year contract with defending Superliga champions Copenhagen instead on 23 June 2010.

Ottesen made his FC Copenhagen debut, starting the whole game, in a 3–0 win against his former club, SønderjyskE, in the opening game of the season. He then made his UEFA Champions League debut against BATE Borisov in the first leg of the third qualifying round, in a 0–0 draw. FC Copenhagen went on to win 3–2 in the second leg. Following a 2–1 loss against Rosenborg in the first leg, the then 26 year old Ottesen could hardly have popped up at a more important time to register his first goal for [Copenhagen, in the UEFA Champions League Play-Off Round against Rosenborg. In the biggest game of his career so far, his perfectly placed header secured Copenhagen a spot in the group stage for only the second time in the club's history. Four days later on 29 August 2010, Ottesen scored his second goal for the side, in a 2–1 win over AC Horsens. Since joining the club, he found himself in a competition with Mathias Jørgensen and Mikael Antonsson over the centre–back position. During a 2–0 win over Brøndby on 19 September 2010, Ottesen fractured his arm and was sidelined between four and six weeks. On 24 October 2010 he returned from injury, coming on as a substitute in the 70th minute, in a 3–0 win over Silkeborg. In a follow–up match against Lyngby on 30 October 2010, Ottesen came on as a late substitute and scored in a 3–2 win. However, he then suffered a back injury in January 2011 and sidelined for four months. While on the sidelines, the club won the league title after winning 2–1 against Lyngby on 21 April 2011. On 16 May 2011 he returned to the first team, coming on as a late substitute, in a 1–1 draw against AC Horsens. At the end of the 2010–11 season, Ottesen went on to make twenty appearances and scoring three times in all competitions.

In the 2011–12 season, Ottesen started the season well when he scored his first goals of the season, in a 2–2 draw against Odense BK on 23 July 2011. Four days later, on 27 July 2011, Ottesen scored his second goal of the season, in a 1–0 win over Shamrock Rovers in the first leg of the UEFA Champions League Third Qualifying Round. FC Copenhagen was through to the next round after beating Shamrock Rovers 2–0 in the second leg (3–0 on aggregate). Despite suffering an injury at the start of the season, he regained his first team place for the side, playing in the centre–back position. Ottesen scored his fourth goal of the season, in a 3–1 loss against Viktoria Plzeň in the first leg of the UEFA Champions League play–off qualifying round. In the second leg of the UEFA Champions League play–off qualifying round against Viktoria Plzeň, FC Copenhagen lost 2–1 once again (5–2 on aggregate), eliminating them from the tournament. He was part of the club's defence squad to keep three clean sheets in a row between 10 September 2011 and 18 September 2011 against Lyngby BK, Vorskla Poltava and Aalborg BK. After being dropped for one match against Nordsjælland on 24 October 2011, Ottesen scored on his return three days later, in a 3–0 win over Bröndby in the third round of the Sydbank Pokalen, followed up by scoring his sixth goal of the season, in a 3–1 win over Odense BK. After being dropped from the first team for the match against Bröndby on 20 November 2011, he scored his seventh goal of the season, in a 2–0 win over Nordsjælland in the quarter–finals of the Sydbank Pokalen. Once again, Ottesen was part of the club's defence squad to keep three clean sheets in a row between 11 March 2012 and 25 March 2012 against SönderjyskE, FC Midtjylland and Silkeborg IF. He then scored his eighth goal of the season, in a 5–0 win over HB Køge on 15 April 2012. After being dropped the next six matches, Ottesen scored on his return on 13 May 2012, in a 2–2 draw against SönderjyskE. But he was dropped from the squad for the Danish Cup Final, as the club went on to win the trophy after beating AC Horsens 1–0. At the end of the 2011–12 season, Ottesen went on to make thirty–six appearances and scoring nine times in all competitions.

In the 2012–13 season, Ottesen was featured in the first two league matches of the season. He played in both legs against Club Brugge in the third qualifying round of the UEFA Champions League, as they won 3–2 on aggregate. His first goal for the club this season came on 25 August 2012, in a 3–2 win over Randers. However, Ottesen's first team opportunities became limited, having fallen out with new Manager Ariël Jacobs, as well as, his own injury concern when he suffered a back injury. At one point, Jacobs said that Ottesen has an unprofessional attitude, which contributed to their fallen out. Despite making two rare appearances later in the 2012–13 season, the club, once again, won the league. At the end of the 2012–13 season, he went on to make nine appearances and scoring once in all competitions. It was announced on 10 June 2013 that Ottesen will be leaving Copenhagen, as his contract expires at the end of the 2012–13 season. Although he ruled out joining another Danish club, he was linked with a move back to Sweden, with Djurgården interested in signing him. During his time at Copenhagen Sölvi played an important role with the champions, making 43 appearances in the Danish Superliga with a tally of 8 goals.

=== Ural ===
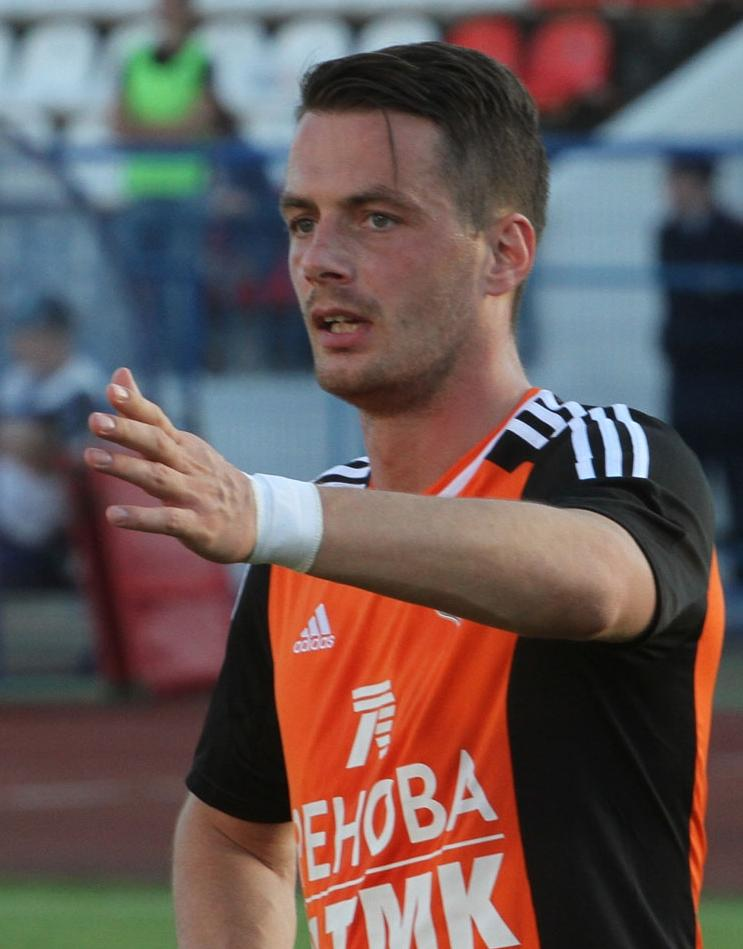
Ottesen pictured during his time at Ural in 2014.

On 1 August 2013, he moved to Russia by signing a two-year contract to Ural. In an interview with Morgunblaðið, Sölvi described that he "immediately took pleasure in the Russian Premier League. This really is a great adventure. To play in such a challenging football league makes it even more fun. I am facing very strong opponents every week; some world-class players in bigger teams such as Zenit, CSKA Moscow and Rubin Kazan".

However, Ottesen's debut suffered a setback when he suffered an injury that kept him out for a month. On 30 September 2013 Ottesen made his Ural debut, starting the whole game, in a 1–1 draw against FC Rostov. Since joining the club, Ottesen quickly became a first team regular for the side, playing in the centre–back position. His performance, at one point, saw him named the club's Player of the Month for November and December. Ottesen set up the club's second goal of the game for Denis Dorozhkin, who scored a winning goal, in a 2–1 win over Kuban Krasnodar on 10 May 2014. Despite being sidelined on two occasions later in the 2013–14 season, he helped the side finish eleventh place in the league and finished his first season, making eighteen appearances.

In the 2014–15 season, Ottesen continued to be in the first team regular for the side, playing in the centre–back position. However, during a match Torpedo Moscow on 16 August 2014, he scored an own goal to give the opposition team a 2–0 lead in stoppage time, as Ural lost 2–0. Despite being sidelined on two occasions, Ottesen went on to make fifteen appearances for the side. By the time he departed the club, Ottesen made 33 appearances for Ural in the Russian Premier League.

=== Jiangsu Sainty ===
On 14 February 2015, Sölvi transferred to Chinese Super League side Jiangsu Sainty, signing a two–year contract with the club.

Ottesen made his Jiangsu Sainty debut in the opening game of the season against Shanghai SIPG, starting the whole game, in a 2–1 loss. After missing two matches with a groin injury, he scored on his return, in a 2–1 win over Shijiazhuang Ever Bright on 5 April 2015. His second goal for the club came on 27 June 2015, in a 4–1 loss against Shanghai SIPG. He later scored two more goals later in the season. He celebrated his 7th career title in winning the Chinese FA Cup with Jiangsu under coach Dan Petrescu after beating Shanghai SIPG 1–0 on aggregate when the match in the second leg went extra time. At the end of the 2015 season, Ottesen went on to make thirty–one appearances and scoring four times in all competitions.

=== Wuhan Zall ===
On 4 February 2016, Ottesen transferred to China League One club Wuhan Zall.

He made his Wuhan Zall debut, starting the whole game, in a 1–1 draw against Beijing Sport University in the opening game of the season. Ottesen then set up an equalising goal for Guto, in a 1–1 draw against Tianjin Tianhai on 22 May 2016. Ottesen captained the side for the first time, where he helped the side keep a clean sheet, in a 0–0 draw against Qingdao Huanghai on 12 June 2016. He scored his first goal for the club, in a 4–2 loss against Beijing Sport University on 3 July 2016. Ottesen later scored two more goals later in the 2016 season against Qingdao Huanghai and Shanghai Shenxin. However, his playing time was reduced, due to his suspension that saw him banned for three matches. Ottesen made 23 appearances while getting on the scoresheet three times in the 2016 season with Wuhan Zall and filing for 6th place in the league. At the end of the 2017 season, the club announced his departure along with Guto and Michael Barrantes.

=== Buriram United ===
On 6 February 2017, it was announced that Thai League 1 side Buriram United had completed the signing of the Icelandic defender from Chinese League One club Wuhan Zall. In doing so, Ottesen became the first Icelandic footballer to play in the Thai League 1 division. Upon joining the club, he said: "There was an invitation from Thailand that I was excited about and I just jumped on this offer from Buriram United".

In taking on yet another challenge in entering Thai League 1, Ottesen made 12 appearances scoring one goal, which he scored on his debut against Chonburi in the opening game of the season. Despite his departure on 18 June 2017, Ottesen, nevertheless, received a medal when Buriram United were the league winners.

=== Guangzhou R&F ===
Halfway through the China Super League season, on 13 July 2017, it was reported that Sölvi would make his return to China, this time to help Guangzhou R&F in the top flight. It came after when the club was interested in signing him.

Ottesen made his Guangzhou R&F debut, starting the whole game, in a 3–2 loss against Changchun Yatai on 16 July 2017. He then scored his first goal for the club, in a 4–1 win over Liaoning on 6 August 2017. However, he was sent–off for a second bookable offence, in a 2–0 loss against Guizhou Hengfeng on 13 August 2017. After making five appearances for Guangzhou R&F, the side finished 5th in the league table in the 2017 season. It was announced on 23 November 2017 that Ottesen departed Guangzhou R&F to return to his homeland.

=== Víkingur ===
On 1 January 2018, Sölvi returned to the club he played for as a youth, Víkingur, signing a three-year deal.

Ottesen made his first appearance for the club since leaving fourteen years ago, appearing as captain against Valur and started the whole game, as Víkingur drew 0–0 in the opening game of the season. Ottesen started in every match since making his debut and performed impressively. This lasted until he suffered an injury early in the game against Valur on 22 July 2018, resulting in his substitution. Following this, Ottesen was sidelined for the rest of the season. At the end of the 2018 season, he went on to make fifteen appearances in all competitions.

At the start of the 2019 season, Ottesen managed to recover from his injury and started the season well when he scored in the opening game of the season, in a 3–3 draw against Valur. His second goal of the season came on 15 May 2019, in a 4–3 loss against Stjarnan. However, in a 1–0 loss against KR Reykjavík on 25 May 2019, he was sent–off for a professional foul in the 77th minute. A month later, Ottesen scored his third goal of the season, in a 3–2 win over ÍBV in the quarter–finals of the Icelandic Cup. Since returning to the first team, he continued to regain his first team place and retaining his captaincy. On 14 September 2019, he captained his side to triumph as they won the 2019 Icelandic Cup, their first trophy in forty–eight years after beating Fimleikafélag Hafnarfjarðar 1–0. At the end of the 2019 season, Ottesen went on to make twenty–four appearances and scoring three times in all competitions. Following this, Ottesen was named Viking athlete of the year at the club's award ceremony in Reykjavik.

The start of the 2020 season saw Ottesen regained his first team place, as well as, his captaincy for Víkingur. However, in a match against KR Reykjavík on 4 July 2020, he received a straight red card in the 78th minute, as the club lost 2–0. After serving a three match suspension, Ottesen returned to the starting line–up for a match against Grótta, as KR Reykjavík drew 2–2 on 23 July 2020. He then scored his first goal of the season, in a 4–2 loss against Breiðablik on 16 August 2020. Ottesen, once again, was sent–off in the 5th minute of the game against Olimpija Ljubljana in the first round of the UEFA Europa League, as the club lost 2–1, eliminating KR Reykjavík from the tournament. After missing two matches due to fitness concern, he returned to the starting line–up against ÍA, as the club drew 2–2. KR Reykjavía avoided relegation when the abandoned on 30 October 2020 due to the COVID-19 pandemic, resulting in the club finishing in tenth place. At the end of the 2020 season, Ottesen went on to make fifteen appearances and scoring once in all competitions. Following this, he went on a successful operation on his injury. In 2021, in his final season, he went on to win both the league and the cup in Iceland.

== International career ==
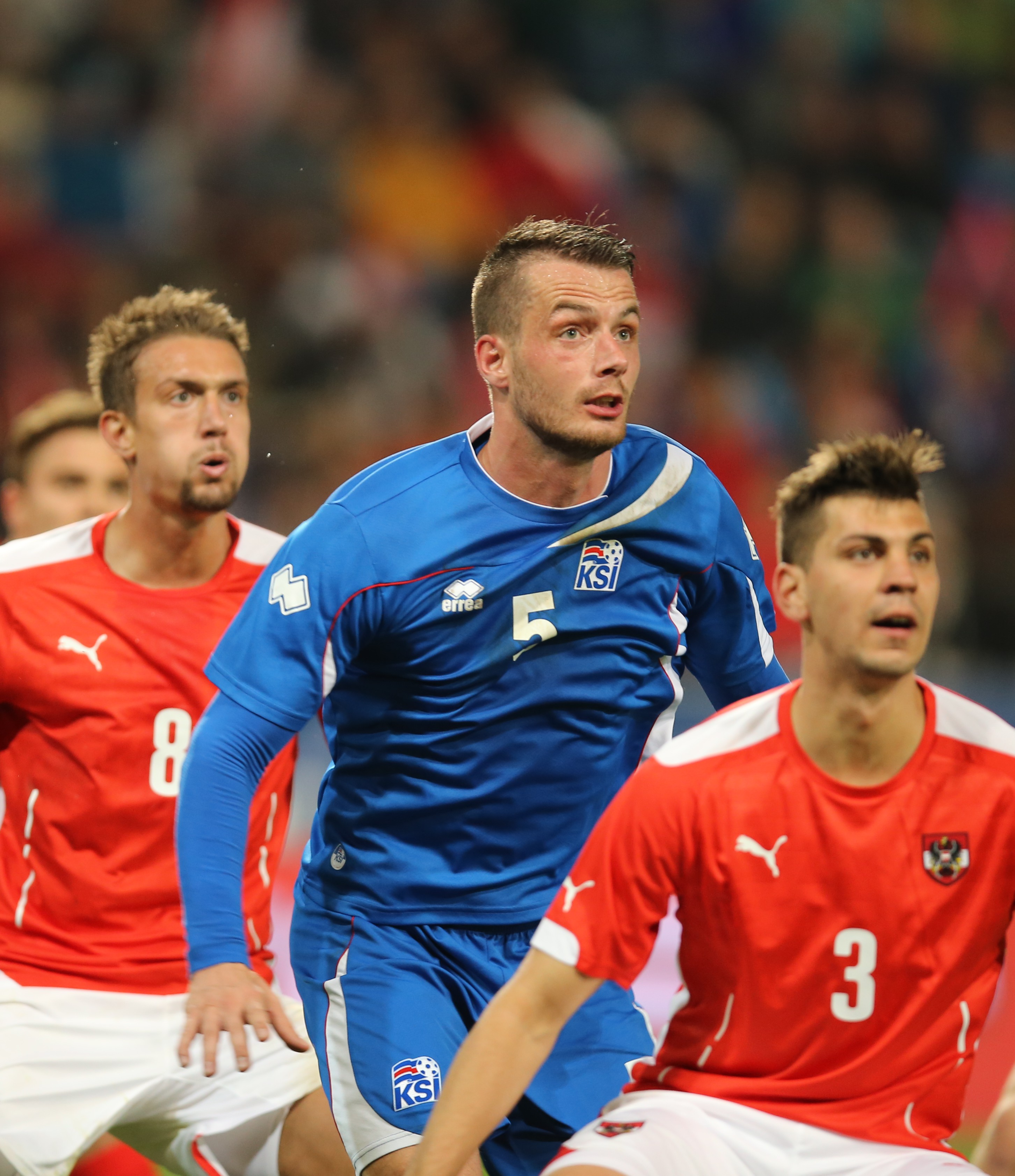
Ottesen (blue) played for Iceland in 2014.

In August 2004, Ottesen was called up to the Iceland U21 squad for the first time He made his debut for the U21 side against Estonia U21, as Iceland U21 lost 2–1. Ottesen went on to make eleven appearances for the U21 side.

On 29 September 2005, Ottesen was called up by Iceland for the first time. He made his first appearance against Poland on 7 October 2005, starting the whole game, in a 3–2 loss. After three years away from the national team, Ottesen was called up by Iceland once again and started the whole game, in a 1–0 win over Malta on 19 November 2008. In September 2010, he captained the national side on two occasions against Norway and Denmark. Ottesen captained the side two more times the following year and assisted two times, in a 5–3 loss against Portugal on 7 October 2011.

However, in a match against Cyprus on 11 September 2012, Ottesen was sent off in the 86th minute for a professional foul, as Iceland lost 1–0. Following the match, he served a two match suspension. On 14 November 2012 Ottesen returned from suspension, starting the whole match, in a 2–0 win over Andorra. His latest appearances came a decade later against Latvia in October 2015 and Finland in January 2016.

In November 2017, Ottesen announced his retirement from international football. He has been capped twenty-eight times for Iceland.

== Coaching career ==
On 20 January 2025, he was announced as manager of Víkingur Reykjavík, taking over from Arnar Gunnlaugsson, having previously been his assistant manager at the club.

== Personal life ==
Ottesen was married to Sandra Karlsdóttir and together, they had three children. Ottesen revealed that one of his children has been diagnosed with autism.

During his early football career, he worked full time at a liquor store. In April 2017, Ottesen purchased a mansion in Fossvogur and resided there since returning from China and Thailand.

== Honours ==
=== Player ===
Djurgårdens IF

- Allsvenskan: 2005
- Svenska Cupen: 2004, 2005

FC Copenhagen

- Danish Superliga: 2010–11, 2012–13
- Danish Cup: 2011–12

Jiangsu Sainty

- Chinese FA Cup: 2015

Víkingur

- Icelandic Premier Division: 2021
- Icelandic Cup: 2019, 2021

=== Managerial ===
Víkingur

- Icelandic Premier Division: 2025, 2026
- Icelandic Super Cup: 2026

Sporting positions
Preceded by (Denmark) Jacob Stolberg	SønderjyskE captain 2008–2010	Succeeded by (Iceland) Ólafur Ingi Skúlason
