= Hvaltorvet =

Coordinates: 59°07′48″N 10°13′36″E

- Alternative names: Hvaltorget

General information
- Type: Shopping mall
- Location: Torget 7, 3210 Sandefjord, Norway
- Opening: 12 October 1989; 37 years ago
- Owner: KLP Eiendom

Technical details
- Floor count: Three
- Floor area: 27,000 square metres (290,000 sq ft)

Other information
- Number of stores: 55- 60
- Parking: 400-500 spaces

Website
- hvaltorvet.no

Hvaltorvet, or Hvaltorget, is the largest shopping mall in Sandefjord in Sandefjord Municipality, Norway. It is located in the town square in the city centre. It first opened in 1989, but an expanded mall was opened on 20 November 2008. It is home to 60-63 stores including H&M, Jack & Jones, Lindex, Narvesen, Telenor, Vero Moda, and Teknikmagasinet. The mall is 27,000 square metres (290,000 sq ft).

Hvaltorvet is named in honor of the city’s iconic whaling epoch.

== History ==
The location of the current mall was formerly a farm owned by Christopher Hvidt.

Kremmerhuset in Tønsberg was the first mall in Vestfold County when constructed in 1971. This is now known as Farmandstredet. The early 1990s saw the opening of Nordbyen in Larvik and Hvaltorvet in Sandefjord. In its first year, 1990, Hvaltorvet’s 13 shops had a turnover of NOK 107 million. In 1998, the mall’s 22 shops had a turnover of NOK 205 million.

Hvaltorvet was built in 1988. It officially opened on 12 October 1989. Mayor Per Foshaug undertook the symbolic opening of the mall by cutting a mooring cable with a flensing knife. Previously owned by Steen & Strøm Invest AS, it was purchased by Norske Liv AS in 1995. It was sold for NOK 170 million and Norske Liv AS became the owner on 1 January 1996. Its net revenue in 2003, which was NOK 233 million, was lower than three other malls in Vestfold: Sjøsiden (236 million), Nordbyen (440 million), and Farmandstredet (1,063 billion).

The mall was expanded in November 2008 to 27,000 m^{2}. 65 apartments were built atop the mall after the 2008 expansion. 199 new parking spaces were also added during the expansion, bringing the total number to 400-500 spaces for parking. The main parking structure is located underneath the town square in the city centre.
