= Joel Rajalakso =

Swedish footballer

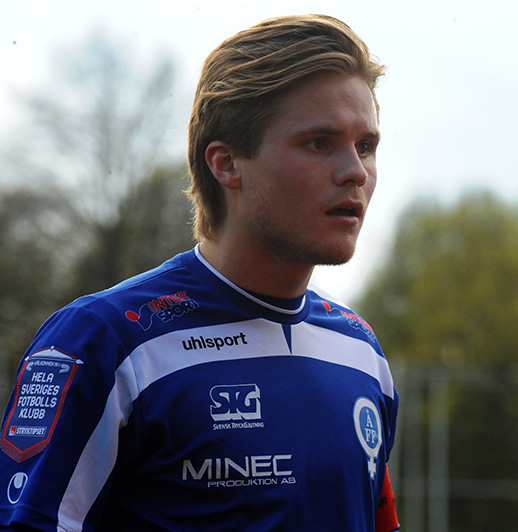

Personal information
- Full name: Carl Joel Samuel Rajalakso
- Date of birth: 2 April 1993 (age 33)
- Place of birth: Enköping, Sweden
- Height: 1.82 m (5 ft 11 1/2 in)
- Position: Midfielder

Youth career
- 2000–2008: Enköpings SK

Senior career*
Years	Team	Apps	(Gls)
2009–2012	Enköpings SK	74	(20)
2013–2014	Åtvidabergs FF	6	(0)
2015	Östers IF	23	(3)
2016	IFK Luleå	26	(9)
2017–2018	Carlstad United	32	(5)
2019	FBK Karlstad	14	(10)
2020–2021	Stockholm Internazionale	21	(4)

International career
2008–2009	Sweden U17	7	(1)
2010	Sweden U19	2	(0)
- * Club domestic league appearances and goals

Carl Joel Samuel Rajalakso (born 2 April 1993) is a Swedish footballer who played as a midfielder.

== Career ==
In 2016 he joined IFK Luleå. He left Carlstad United in December 2018 and rounded off his career in FBK Karlstad and FC Stockholm Internazionale.

== Personal life ==
Rajalakso is the younger brother of Sebastian Rajalakso. He is of Finnish descent through his father who is from Finland.
