= Peter Magnusson (footballer) =

Swedish footballer

Personal information
- Full name: Peter Magnusson
- Date of birth: 16 July 1984 (age 42)
- Place of birth: Sweden
- Height: 1.91 m (6 ft 3 in)
- Position: Defender

Youth career
- Spårvägens FF

Senior career*
Years	Team	Apps	(Gls)
2007	Vasalund/Essinge IF		
2008	Vasalunds IF	11	(4)
2008–2010	Djurgårdens IF	24	(0)
2010	HJK	15	(0)
2010	→ Klubi-04 (loan)	2	(0)
2011–2012	Sandefjord	22	(1)
2012–2015	IK Brage	86	(5)
2016–2017	Vasalunds IF	44	(1)
- * Club domestic league appearances and goals as of 28 January 2016

Peter Magnusson (born July 16, 1984) is a Swedish footballer. He has previously played professional for Djurgårdens IF, HJK Helsinki and Sandefjord Fotball.

== Career ==
After playing for Vasalunds IF, Magnusson joined Djurgårdens IF in 2008. Earlier in his career, he had a brief spell at HTFF, the youth team of Hammarby which is one of Djurgården's major rivals. As a young talent in Hammarby Magnusson stated that he could never play for Djurgården or the other Stockholm rival AIK. Magnusson made his Allsvenskan debut for Djurgården on July 6, 2008, against Trelleborgs FF. He played a total of 24 matches for DIF as a centre-back mainly alongside Toni Kuivasto. Magnusson left Djurgården on February 17, 2010.

He signed for one year with HJK Helsinki just before the 2010 Veikkausliiga season started. He was recommended by former DIF players Aki Riihilahti and Toni Kuivasto. At the same time he played for HJK's feeder club Klubi-04. 28 February 2011 he signed a two years contract with Sandefjord Fotball, and played for the club in Adeccoligaen until he went to IK Brage on 7 August after struggling with getting into the starting eleven at Sandefjord.
