= Markus Johannesson =

Swedish footballer (born 1975)

Personal information
- Date of birth: 29 May 1975 (age 51)
- Place of birth: Rölanda, Sweden
- Height: 1.85 m (6 ft 1 in)
- Positions: Defender; midfielder

Senior career*
| Years | Team | Apps | (Gls) |
| 1994–1996 | IK Oddevold | 65 | (4) |
| 1997–2004 | Örgryte IS | 164 | (11) |
| 2004–2009 | Djurgårdens IF | 136 | (1) |
| Total | | 365 | (16) |

International career
| 1989 | Sweden U17 | 2 | (0) |
| 1996–1998 | Sweden U21 | 11 | (0) |
| 2001–2009 | Sweden | 5 | (1) |
- * Club domestic league appearances and goals

Markus Johannesson (born 29 May 1975) is a Swedish former football defender and football commentator.

== Career ==
Johannesson started his career at Rölanda IF, but moved on to Eds FF and IK Oddevold before he was signed by Örgryte IS in 1997. In 2004, Johannesson left Örgryte IS for Djurgårdens IF. He won The Double with Djurgården in 2005 and was also the captain of the team. He has been capped five times and scored one goal for the Sweden national team. He was later on the 2009 season on the bench for Kebba Ceesay. But later on he took back his place but then as a defensive midfielder where he used to play with Örgryte IS. Johannesson scored his first league goal for Djurgården in his last game against Kalmar FF, helping Djurgården to reach relegation round against Assyriska FF. Djurgården lost the first game away 2–0 but won at home in extra time, 3–0.

Johannesson retired from professional football after the 2009 season.

Since 2010, Johannesson works for SVT as football commentator.

== Career statistics ==
=== International ===
Appearances and goals by national team and year
| National team | Year | Apps | Goals |
|---|---|---|---|
| Sweden | 2001 | 1 | 0 |
| Sweden | 2002 | 0 | 0 |
| Sweden | 2003 | 4 | 1 |
| Total | | 5 | 1 |

Scores and results list Sweden's goal tally first, score column indicates score after each Johannesson goal.

List of international goals scored by Markus Johannesson
| No. | Date | Venue | Opponent | Score | Result | Competition | Ref. |
|---|---|---|---|---|---|---|---|
| 1 | 22 February 2003 | National Stadium, Bangkok, Thailand | North Korea | 3–0 | 4–0 | 2003 King's Cup | |

== Honours ==
Djurgårdens IF

- Allsvenskan: 2005
- Svenska Cupen : 2004, 2005

Sweden

- King's Cup: 2003

Individual

- Årets Järnkamin: 2009
