= Per Johansson (footballer, born 1989) =

Swedish footballer

Personal information
- Date of birth: 6 April 1989 (age 37)
- Position: Defender

Senior career*
| Years | Team | Apps | (Gls) |
| 2007–2008 | Djurgården | 4 | (0) |
| 2008–2011 | Örebro SK | 48 | (2) |
- * Club domestic league appearances and goals

Per Johansson (born 6 April 1989) is a Swedish football player, currently playing for BK Forward. Johansson usually plays as a left wing defender. He made his Allsvenskan debut when Djurgården played against Gefle IF on 9 April 2008. He joined the Djurgården from Karlslunds IF at the start of the 2007 season. He also played for Örebro SK.
