= 2005 Svenska Cupen =

Tournament details
- Country: Sweden
- Teams: 96

Final positions
- Champions: Djurgårdens IF
- Runners-up: Åtvidabergs FF

Tournament statistics
- Matches played: 96

The 2005 Svenska Cupen was the 50th season of the main Swedish football Cup. The competition started on 20 March 2005 and concluded on 29 November 2005 with the final, held at Råsunda Stadium, Solna Municipality in Stockholm County. Djurgårdens IF won the final 2–0 against Åtvidabergs FF.

== First round ==
The 32 matches were played between 20 March and 14 April 2005. There were 68 teams in the first round from Division 1, Division 2 and Division 3, but also including a few teams from Division 4 and Division 5.

Team 1	Score	Team 2
20 March 2005
Tvååkers IF	0–3	Malmö Anadolu BI
28 March 2005
IK Sleipner	4–3	Syrianska FC
Jämjö GoIF	1–4	Ystads IF FF
2 April 2005
Lärje/Angereds IF	1–0	Skärhamns IK
3 April 2005
Segeltorps IF	1–2 (aet)	Topkapi Konya KIF
BK Forward	0–0 (aet); 5–6 (p)	Enskede IK
6 April 2005
Söderhamns FF	1–2	Sandvikens IF
Tyresö FF	0–4	Vallentuna BK
9 April 2005
Husqvarna FF	3–1	IF Heimer
Kulladals FF	1–7	Bunkeflo IF
Långås IF	0–4	Limhamns IF
Mölnlycke IF	1–3	Tidaholms GoIF
IFK Värnamo	3–3 (aet); 5–4 (p)	Kristianstads FF
Kalmar AIK	2–0	Ängelholms FF
Östersunds FK	3–1	Kubikenborgs IF
IF Väster	0–4	Melleruds IF
IFK Arboga	2–6	Forssa BK
Valtorps IF	1–3	Tenhults IF
Skellefteå AIK	3–0	Sävast AIF
IK Fyris	0–5	Vasalund/Essinge IF
Växjö BK	0–3	Lunds BK
10 April 2005
Bara GoIF	2–0	Kvibille BK
Sälen/S-Lima	0–6	Carlstad United BK
Värtans IK	3–3 (aet); 0–3 (p)	Visby IF Gute FK
Linköpings FF	0–3	Degerfors IF
Gamla Upsala SK	0–0 (aet); 7–8 (p)	Spårvägens FF
Lundby IF	1–3	Kinna IF
Skövde AIK	2–1	Jönköpings Södra
Gammalkils IF	0–2	Rynninge IK
IK Oden	0–2	IFK Ölme
Svenljunga IK	2–0	Myresjö IF
14 April 2005
Assi IF	0–1	Bureå IF

== Second round ==
In this round the 32 winning teams from the previous round were joined by 32 teams from Allsvenskan and Superettan. The 32 matches were played between 19 April and 21 April 2005.

Team 1	Score	Team 2
19 April 2005
Bara GoIF	0–6	IK Sleipner
FC Trollhättan	0–0 (aet); 6–7 (p)	Väsby United
Bureå IF	0–2	Trelleborgs FF
20 April 2005
Visby IF Gute FK	2–0	Friska Viljor FC
Forssa BK	3–4 (aet)	Tenhults IF
Skövde AIK	0–1	Östersunds FK
IFK Ölme	1–1 (aet); 4–1 (p)	IK Brage
Husqvarna FF	0–7	IF Elfsborg
Ystads IF FF	0–2	Halmstads BK
Kinna IF	1–2 (aet)	Åtvidabergs FF
Kalmar AIK FK	1–7	IFK Göteborg
Melleruds IF	0–3 (aet)	GAIS
Topkapi IK	0–3	Landskrona BoIS
Skellefteå FF	1–1 (aet); 4–2 (p)	IF Brommapojkarna
Spårvägens FF	0–2	Assyriska Föreningen
Vasalund/Essinge IF	1–1 (aet); 4–3 (p)	Örebro SK
Sandvikens IF	1–2	Östers IF
Lunds BK	2–2 (aet); 5–3 (p)	Västra Frölunda IF
Anundsjö IF	1–5	IFK Norrköping
Vallentuna BK	1–3	Malmö FF
Tidaholms GoIF	0–4	Bodens BK
21 April 2005
IFK Värnamo	0–2	Hammarby IF
Rynninge IK	1–3	Djurgårdens IF
Valsta Syrianska IK	4–3 (aet)	Falkenbergs FF
Bunkeflo IF	1–0	Västerås SK FK
Limhamns IF	0–0 (aet); 4–5 (p)	BK Häcken
Lärje-Angereds IF	0–0 (aet); 4–5 (p)	Kalmar FF
Enskede IK	2–0 (aet)	Helsingborgs IF
Svenljunga IK	0–2	Gefle IF
Malmö Anadolu BI	0–1 (aet)	GIF Sundsvall
Carlstad United BK	0–3	AIK
Degerfors IF	1–3	Örgryte IS

== Third round ==
The 16 matches in this round were played between 4 May and 19 May 2005.

Team 1	Score	Team 2
4 May 2005
Valsta Syrianska IK	0–4	Örgryte IS
Östersunds FK	2–3	Åtvidabergs FF
Assyriska Föreningen	2–1	Gefle IF
5 May 2005
Halmstads BK	3–2	Bodens BK FF
Enskede IK	3–1	Visby IF Gute FK
Trelleborgs FF	1–0	AIK
Bunkeflo IF	0–3	GIF Sundsvall
Vasalund/Essinge IF	0–1	IF Elfsborg
Lunds BK	1–4	IFK Norrköping
Skellefteå AIK	2–11	IFK Göteborg
Tenhults IF	0–1	IFK Ölme
Östers IF	0–1	BK Häcken
IK Sleipner	1–2	GAIS
Väsby United	0–2	Djurgårdens IF
Kalmar FF	3–1	Hammarby IF
19 May 2005
Landskrona BoIS	1–3	Malmö FF

== Fourth round ==
The 8 matches in this round were played between 1 June and 13 July 2005.

Team 1	Score	Team 2
1 June 2005
IFK Ölme	1–1 (aet); 5–4 (p)	Kalmar FF
7 June 2005
Örgryte IS	1–1 (aet); 2–4 (p)	Assyriska Föreningen
9 June 2005
IFK Göteborg	1–2	IF Elfsborg
10 June 2005
Enskede IK	1–5	Djurgårdens IF
30 June 2005
Åtvidabergs FF	1–0	Trelleborgs FF
BK Häcken	0–0 (aet); 4–3 (p)	Malmö FF
7 July 2005
IFK Norrköping	2–0	GIF Sundsvall
13 July 2005
GAIS	2–1	Halmstads BK

== Quarter-finals ==
The 4 matches in this round were played between 22 July and 4 August 2005.

Team 1	Score	Team 2
22 July 2005
IFK Ölme	0–6	Djurgårdens IF
3 August 2005
Assyriska Föreningen	2–2 (aet); 10–11 (p)	IFK Norrköping
4 August 2005
IF Elfsborg	4–3 (aet)	BK Häcken
Åtvidabergs FF	1–1 (aet); 5–4 (p)	GAIS

== Semi-finals ==
The semi-finals were played on 8 September and 22 September 2005.

Team 1	Score	Team 2
8 September 2005
Åtvidabergs FF	1–0	IFK Norrköping
22 September 2005
Djurgårdens IF	2–1	IF Elfsborg

== Final ==
The final was played on 29 October 2005 at the Råsunda Stadium.

29 October 2005
15:30

Djurgårdens IF	2–0	Åtvidabergs FF
Kuivasto 36'; Hysén 89'	Report

Råsunda, Solna
Attendance: 11,613
Referee: Martin Hansson (Holmsjö)
