= Robert Stoltz =

Swedish footballer

Personal information
- Date of birth: 10 August 1976 (age 50)

Youth career
- Lira BK

Senior career*
Years	Team	Apps	(Gls)
–2004	Bodens BK		
2004–2005	Kalmar FF	37	(0)
2006–2008	Djurgårdens IF	27	(1)
2008	→ Enköpings SK (loan)	18	(0)
- * Club domestic league appearances and goals

Robert Stoltz (born 10 August 1976) is a Swedish football defender.

He joined the Djurgårdens IF for the 2006 season, leaving Kalmar FF. After two seasons with the club, on the first of January 2009 he was sent out on loan to Enköpings SK for the remainder of the 2008 season. Stoltz got little time on the pitch being capped only 27 times. His only goal was scored against IF Elfsborg during the 2007 season. He started his career at Lira Luleå BK in Luleå and has also represented Bodens BK.
