= Lance Davids =

South African footballer (born 1985)

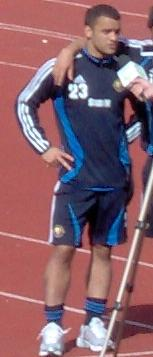
- Davids with Djurgården in 2007

Personal information
- Full name: Lance Davids
- Date of birth: 11 April 1985 (age 41)
- Place of birth: Cape Town, South Africa
- Height: 1.71 m (5 ft 7 in)
- Position: Midfielder

Youth career
- Parkhurst Ambassadors
- Hellenic
- 2001–2004: 1860 Munich

Senior career*
Years	Team	Apps	(Gls)
2004–2005	1860 Munich	21	(0)
2006–2008	Djurgården	64	(6)
2009	Supersport United	6	(0)
2009–2010	Ajax Cape Town	24	(5)
2010–2013	Lierse	28	(1)
2013–2015	Ajax Cape Town	44	(6)
Total		234	(24)

International career
2004–2010	South Africa	23	(0)
- * Club domestic league appearances and goals

Lance Davids (born 11 April 1985) is a South African former professional soccer player who played as a midfielder.

== Club career ==
Born in Cape Town, Davids hails from Mitchell's Plain on the Cape Flats.

In 1999, Davids went for trials with Budgie Byrne with Arsenal and Manchester United.

=== 1860 Munich ===
Recruited from the Cape Town based club Hellenic F.C. at age 15 by TSV 1860 Munich, Lance Davids is a youth product of the Bavarian club to which he transferred in 2001. He made his professional debut on 22 November 2003 in a 1–0 loss to Bayern Munich. He made his debut in the German 2. Bundesliga in the 2004–05 season, playing for 1860 Munich making 21 league appearances before transferring to the Swedish Djurgårdens IF from Stockholm.

=== Djurgården IF ===
Davids came to Djurgårdens IF from 1860 Munich in Germany at the start of the 2006 season, but had a tough time establishing himself as a starter at the beginning of the season. However, as the season went on, Davids became a regular name in the Djurgården starting line-up. During the 2007 season, Davids played on the right as a midfielder or as a defender. He made his debut on 6 April 2007. He was voted best right back in the Swedish League in 2007 and 2008.

In December 2007, he trialed with two English Premier League clubs, Blackburn Rovers and Newcastle United, but no transfer materialised.

=== Supersport United and Ajax CT ===
In early 2009, Davids signed as a free agent with South African champions SuperSport United on a short-term contract. He made his debut on 4 February 2009 in a 3–0 over Bay United. After one year with Ajax Cape Town F.C., Davids signed on 11 June 2010 for Lierse SK on a free transfer.

=== Lierse ===
Davids, who represented South Africa at the 2010 FIFA World Cup, penned a three-year deal with recently promoted Belgian team Lierse S.K. that same summer. He was Lierse's first transfer of the 2010–11 Belgian First Division campaign. He made his debut on 31 July 2010 in a 1–0 loss to Sint Truiden.

=== Ajax Cape Town ===
On 31 January 2013, Ajax Cape Town confirmed the signing of their former player from the Belgian club along with fellow South African international Mabhuti Khenyeza. He played what would be his last match on 21 April 2015 in a 1–0 loss to Free State Stars.

== International career ==
Davids made his debut for the South Africa national team on 30 March 2004 against Australia in a 1–0 defeat at Loftus Road, London. His last international was a 4–0 win over Thailand on 16 May 2015.

== Retirement ==
Davids announced his retirement on 18 May 2015 at the age of 30.
