= Kristoffer Näfver =

Swedish footballer (born 1986)

Personal information
- Full name: Kristoffer Näfver
- Date of birth: September 4, 1986 (age 40)
- Place of birth: Örebro, Sweden
- Height: 1.72 m (5 ft 8 in)
- Position: Midfielder

Team information
- Current team: Rynninge IK
- Number: 11

Youth career
- Adolfsbergs IK
- 2003: Örebro SK

Senior career*
Years	Team	Apps	(Gls)
2004–2009	Örebro SK	62	(2)
2008	→ Djurgårdens IF (loan)	5	(0)
2009	Assyriska FF	12	(0)
2010	Landskrona BoIS	0	(0)
2011–2013	BK Forward	69	(22)
2014	Motala AIF	24	(0)
2015–2016	BK Forward	47	(1)
2017–	Rynninge IK	–	(–)

International career^{‡}
2007–2008	Sweden U21	5	(1)

Managerial career
- 2017–: Rynninge IK (playing sports director)
- * Club domestic league appearances and goals ‡ National team caps and goals as of 30 November 2017

Kristoffer Näfver (born 28 March 1986) is a Swedish footballer who plays for Rynninge IK. He is also the sports director at the club.

== Career ==
Näfver started his career in Adolfsbergs IK and joined 2004 to Örebro SK. He played for Örebro SK until 2009, except for the second half of the 2008 season when he played on loan for Djurgårdens IF.
