= Sebastian Rajalakso =

Swedish footballer

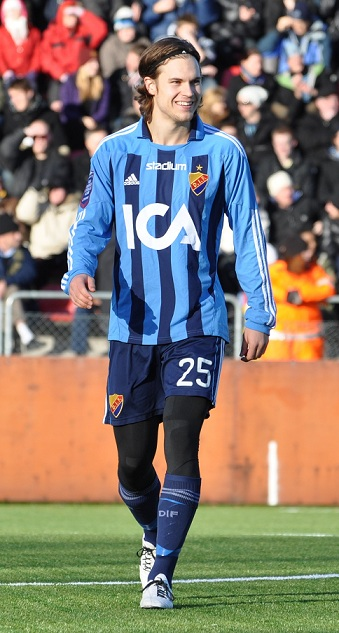

Personal information
- Full name: Per Johan Sebastian Rajalakso
- Date of birth: 23 September 1988 (age 38)
- Place of birth: Enköping, Sweden
- Height: 1.86 m (6 ft 1 in)
- Position: Midfielder

Team information
- Current team: Nordic United FC
- Number: 11

Youth career
- –1999: Fanna BK
- 2000–2006: Enköpings SK

Senior career*
Years	Team	Apps	(Gls)
2007	Enköpings SK	29	(8)
2008–2013	Djurgårdens IF	127	(18)
2013	→ Syrianska FC (loan)	23	(4)
2014	Jagiellonia Białystok	7	(0)
2014	Jagiellonia Białystok II	5	(1)
2014–2017	GIF Sundsvall	80	(2)
2018–2020	Syrianska FC	55	(8)
2020	Fanna BK	0	(0)
2020–	Nordic United FC	73	(4)

International career
2007	Sweden U19	2	(0)
2008–2010	Sweden U21	9	(2)
- * Club domestic league appearances and goals as of 24 November 2025

Per Johan Sebastian Rajalakso (born 23 September 1988) is a Swedish footballer who plays as a midfielder for Nordic United FC.

== Career ==
Rajalakso joined Djurgårdens IF in the beginning of 2008 from Enköpings SK. He made his debut against IFK Norrköping on March 30, 2008, scoring the 2-0 goal. During his time at Djurgården, he has usually been employed as a left winger in a 4-4-2 formation, but he has also been used as a central attacker in a 4-3-3 system.

He started the 2008 season by scoring in the first five games in the Swedish first league.

In early 2009, Rajalakso was called up to the Swedish U21 squad, taking part in two games against Belgium.

In 2014, Rajalakso played for Polish club Jagiellonia Białystok.

== Personal life ==
Rajalakso was born in Sweden to a Finnish father and Swedish mother. He is the older brother of fellow footballer Joel Rajalakso.

== Career statistics ==
Appearances and goals by club, season and competition
Club	Season	League			National cup		League cup		Continental		Total	
Club	Season	Division	Apps	Goals	Apps	Goals	Apps	Goals	Apps	Goals	Apps	Goals
Enköping	2007	Superettan	29	8	—		—		—		29	8
Djurgården	2008	Allsvenskan	27	7	0	0	—		2	0	29	7
Djurgården	2009	Allsvenskan	28	3	1	0	—		0	0	29	3
Djurgården	2010	Allsvenskan	20	1	1	0	—		0	0	21	1
Djurgården	2011	Allsvenskan	28	5	2	0	—		0	0	30	5
Djurgården	2012	Allsvenskan	27	2	0	0	—		0	0	27	2
Djurgården	Total		130	18	4	0	—		2	0	124	18
Syrianska FC (loan)	2013	Allsvenskan	10	1	0	0	—		0	0	10	1
Jagiellonia Białystok	2013–14	Ekstraklasa	7	0	0	0	—		—		7	0
Jagiellonia Białystok II	2013–14	III liga	5	1	—		—		—		5	1
Career total			181	28	4	0	—		2	0	187	28
