= Teknikmagasinet =

Swedish-based retail company

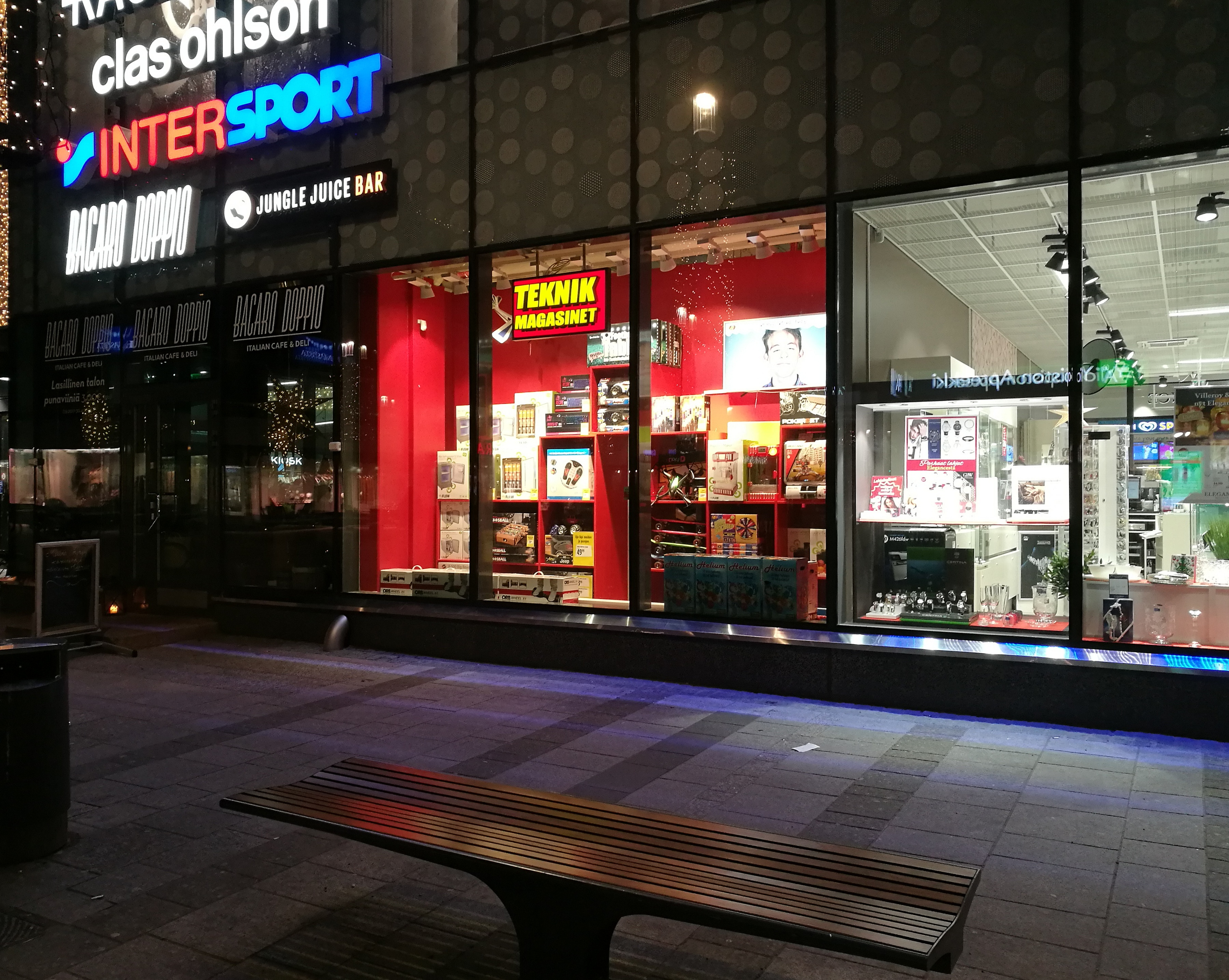
Teknikmagasinet in Oulu, Finland.

Teknikmagasinet AB is a Swedish-based retail company which sells consumer electronics and gadgets. Founded in 1989, the company operates stores in Sweden, Norway and Finland. Since January 2004 the company has been controlled by venture capital group 3i Group, which holds a 45% stake, and chairman Bo Lundquist. With 68 stores in Sweden (23 of which are in Stockholm), 20 in Norway and 5 in Finland, Teknikmagasinet reported revenues of 800 million SEK in 2008. Approximately 10 new stores are opened every year. There are nearly 4000 products that are promoted via their catalogue. On 29 January 2020, it was announced that the Swedish company Ambia Trading Group is buying the chain for 41 million Swedish kronor and will take over as owners on 19 February of the same year.
