= Carlstad United BK =

Swedish football club

- Full name: Carlstad United Bollklubb
- Founded: 1998
- Dissolved: 2019
- Ground: Tingvalla IP, Karlstad
- Capacity: 10,000
- League: Division 2 Norra Götaland
- 2019: Division 1 Norra, 4th
Home colours	Away colours

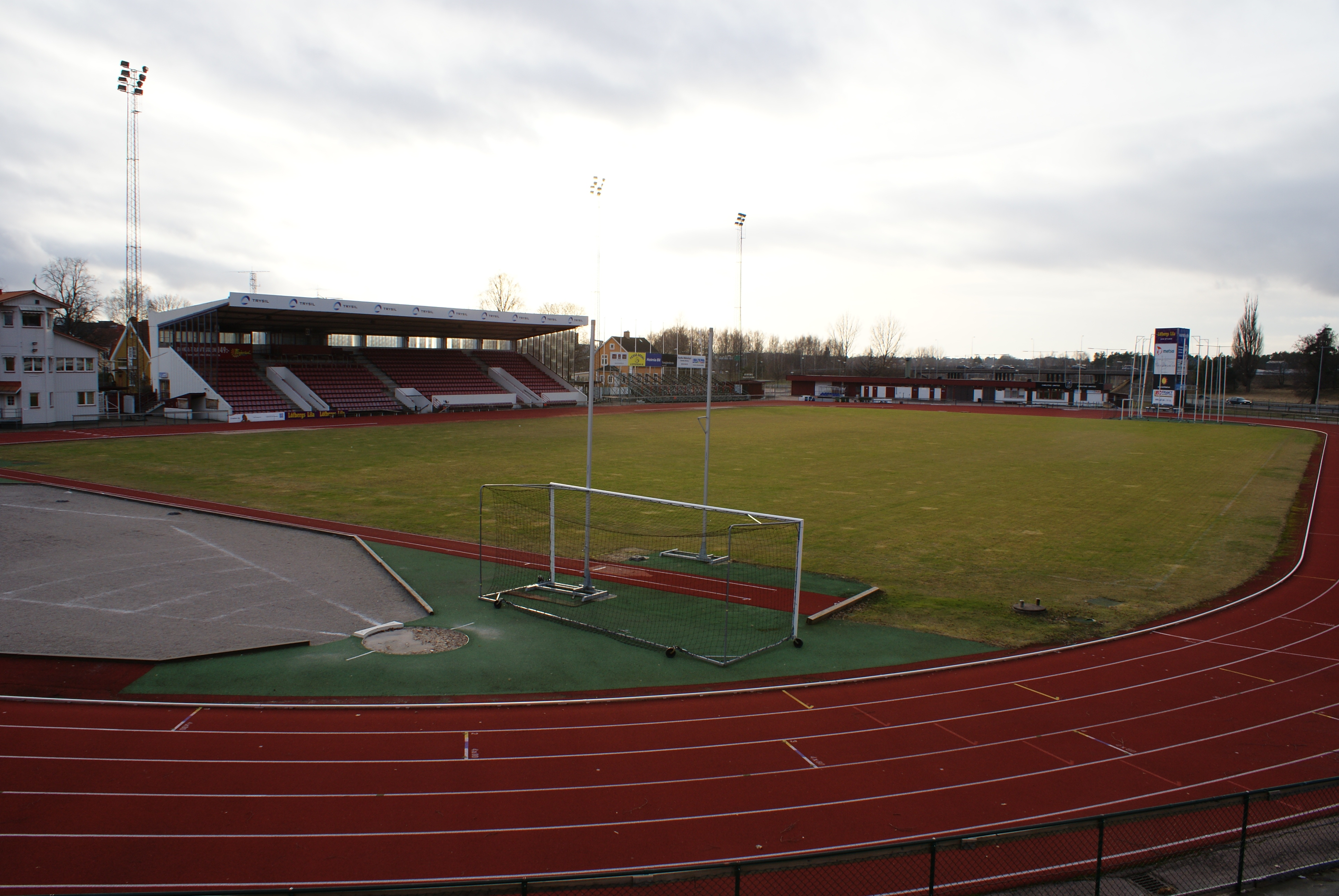
Tingvalla IP

Carlstad United BK was a Swedish football club located in Karlstad. The club, formed in 1998, last played in the third highest Swedish league, Division 1 Norra. The club was affiliated to the Värmlands Fotbollförbund.

== History ==
Carlstad United BK came together as a joint-senior team in 1998 for Hertzöga BK, Innerstadens BK, FBK Karlstad, IFK Kronoparken, Norrstrands IF, Råtorps IK, and Sommarro IF. Carlstad United debuted in the 2000 Division 3 Västra Svealand; then played in Division 1 from 2006 to 2010 and from 2015 to 2019.

They merged with Karlstad BK after the 2019 season to form IF Karlstad Fotboll.

== Season to season ==
Season	Level	Division	Section	Position	Movements
2000	Tier 4	Division 3	Västra Svealand	2nd	
2001	Tier 4	Division 3	Västra Svealand	4th	
2002	Tier 4	Division 3	Västra Svealand	3rd	
2003	Tier 4	Division 3	Västra Svealand	2nd	Promoted
2004	Tier 3	Division 2	Västra Svealand	8th	
2005	Tier 3	Division 2	Västra Götaland	4th	Promoted
2006*	Tier 3	Division 1	Södra	11th	
2007	Tier 3	Division 1	Södra	7th	
2008	Tier 3	Division 1	Södra	3rd	
2009	Tier 3	Division 1	Norra	7th	
2010	Tier 3	Division 1	Norra	12th	Relegated
2011	Tier 4	Division 2	Norra Götaland	5th	
2012	Tier 4	Division 2	Södra Svealand	2nd	
2013	Tier 4	Division 2	Norra Götaland	2nd	
2014	Tier 4	Division 2	Norra Götaland	1st	Promoted

* League restructuring in 2006 resulted in a new division being created at Tier 3 and subsequent divisions dropping a level.

== Attendances ==
In recent seasons Carlstad United BK have had the following average attendances:

Season	Average attendance	Division / Section	Level
2005	273	Div 2 Västra Götaland	Tier 3
2006	271	Div 1 Södra	Tier 3
2007	338	Div 1 Södra	Tier 3
2008	379	Div 1 Södra	Tier 3
2009	646	Div 1 Norra	Tier 3
2010	387	Div 1 Norra	Tier 3
2011	236	Div 2 Norra Götaland	Tier 4
2012	204	Div 2 Södra Svealand	Tier 4
2013	402	Div 2 Norra Götaland	Tier 4
2014	396	Div 2 Norra Götaland	Tier 4

* Attendances are provided in the Publikliga sections of the Svenska Fotbollförbundet website.

== Notable former players ==
- Joel Rajalakso

== Managers ==
- Björn-Magne Broen (2000–01)
- Börje Andersson (2002–06)
- Per-Johan Karlsson (2007–08)
- Lennart Andersson (2008)
- Milenko Vukcevic (2008–09)
- Håkan Werme & Roger Werner (2010)
- Lars-Olof Andersson (2010)
- Dave Mosson (2011–2013)
- Jonas Rehnberg (2014–2015)
- Amir Alagić (2016)
- David Ekelund (2016–)
