= Stefan Batan =

Assyrian-Swedish footballer

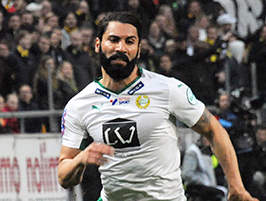

Personal information
- Full name: Stefan Batan
- Date of birth: 20 March 1985 (age 41)
- Place of birth: Södertälje, Sweden
- Height: 1.76 m (5 ft 9 in)
- Positions: Defender; midfielder

Youth career
- Assyriska FF

Senior career*
Years	Team	Apps	(Gls)
2003–2005	Assyriska FF	53	(2)
2006–2009	Djurgårdens IF	41	(2)
2008–2009	→ Assyriska FF (loan)	41	(4)
2010–2013	Assyriska FF	105	(3)
2014–2017	Hammarby IF	58	(0)
2018	Assyriska FF	14	(0)
2018–2019	Västerås SK	14	(1)
2021	Nordic United FC	2	(0)

International career
2005	Sweden U21	2	(0)
- * Club domestic league appearances and goals as of 26 January 2018

Stefan Batan (Syriac: ܣܬܖܔܐܢ ܒܐܬܐܢ; born 20 March 1985) is a Swedish former professional footballer who played as a defender. He is best known for his time at Assyriska FF, but also represented Djurgårdens IF and Hammarby IF in Allsvenskan.

== Career ==
Batan began his career at Assyriska Föreningen. He made his first appearance in the first-team squad in Superettan during the 2003 season. Assyriska was promoted to Allsvenskan in 2004, and Batan made his Allsvenskan debut against Hammarby IF on 11 April 2005. After the 2005 season, Batan received several offers from a number of clubs and was involved in some controversy on leaving Assyriska. AIK had announced to media that Batan had signed for them, claiming they had an oral agreement, but had to see themselves fooled as he signed for their archrivals Djurgårdens IF only a few days later. Batan claimed it was a childhood dream to play for Djurgården, whereas fans of AIK found his "treachery" very hard to accept.

On the pitch, Batan had a tough job making himself a regular starter for Djurgården and he was regularly a substitute for the team. During the summer 2008, he was put on loan for Assyriska Föreningen due to lack of time on the pitch. He was also loaned out to Assyriska FF for the 2009 season. He left Djurgården when his contract expired after the 2009 season.

He returned to Assyriska in 2010 where he acted as a regular starter for the club in the Swedish second tier Superettan. During the upcoming three seasons he played a total of 105 games for the club, scoring on 3 occasions. When his contract expired after the 2013 season, he signed a three-year deal with Hammarby Fotboll, a fierce rival of his former club Djurgården.

In the 2014 Superettan he played 27 league games for Hammarby as his side regained promotion to Allsvenskan. In the upcoming two seasons, back in the Swedish first tier, Batan was used more sparingly as a starter. However, in December 2016 he renewed his link to the club signing a new one-year deal. He only appeared in three league games in 2017, and left the club at the end of the season at the expiration of his contract.

On 26 January 2018, Batan returned to Assyriska FF, now competing in Division 1, the Swedish third tier.
