= Jones Kusi-Asare =

Swedish footballer (born 1980)

Personal information
- Full name: Jones Kusi-Asare
- Date of birth: 21 May 1980 (age 46)
- Place of birth: Kumasi, Ghana
- Height: 1.78 m (5 ft 10 in)
- Position: Forward

Senior career*
Years	Team	Apps	(Gls)
1998–1999	Vasalund		
1999–2001	Djurgården	53	(12)
2002–2003	Grazer AK	24	(6)
2003	→ Denizlispor (loan)	3	(0)
2003–2004	Landskrona BoIS	33	(7)
2005–2008	Djurgården	93	(28)
2009–2010	Esbjerg	9	(0)
2010	→ AaB (loan)	4	(1)
2011	Assyriska FF	19	(5)

International career
2001	Sweden U21	1	(0)
- * Club domestic league appearances and goals as of 1 April 2012

Jones Kusi-Asare (born 21 May 1980) is a former professional footballer who played as a forward. Born in Ghana, he represented Sweden at youth level.

== Career ==
He started his career at Vasalunds IF in the Stockholm suburb of Solna. He was signed by Djurgården in 1998 and made his Allsvenskan against IFK Norrköping on 11 April 1999. He struggled in the first two seasons but in 2001 he became their top goalscorer despite the fact that he often started on the bench. After spells at Grazer AK in Austria and Denizlispor in Turkey, he returned to Swedish football in 2003 when he signed for Landskrona BoIS. After two seasons there (2003 and 2004), he returned to Djurgården.

In December 2008, it was announced that he would be playing at Esbjerg fB starting from spring 2009 and signs a contract between 30 June 2011. At 1 September 2010 Esbjerg fB and AaB agreed that Kusi-Asare would join AaB on a loan-contract until 31 December 2010. On 26 January 2011 Jones signed with Assyriska FF from Södertälje Sweden.

== Personal life ==
He is the father of Jonah Kusi-Asare.

== Honours ==
Djurgårdens IF

- Allsvenskan: 2005
