= Enrico (footballer) =

Brazilian footballer (born 1984)

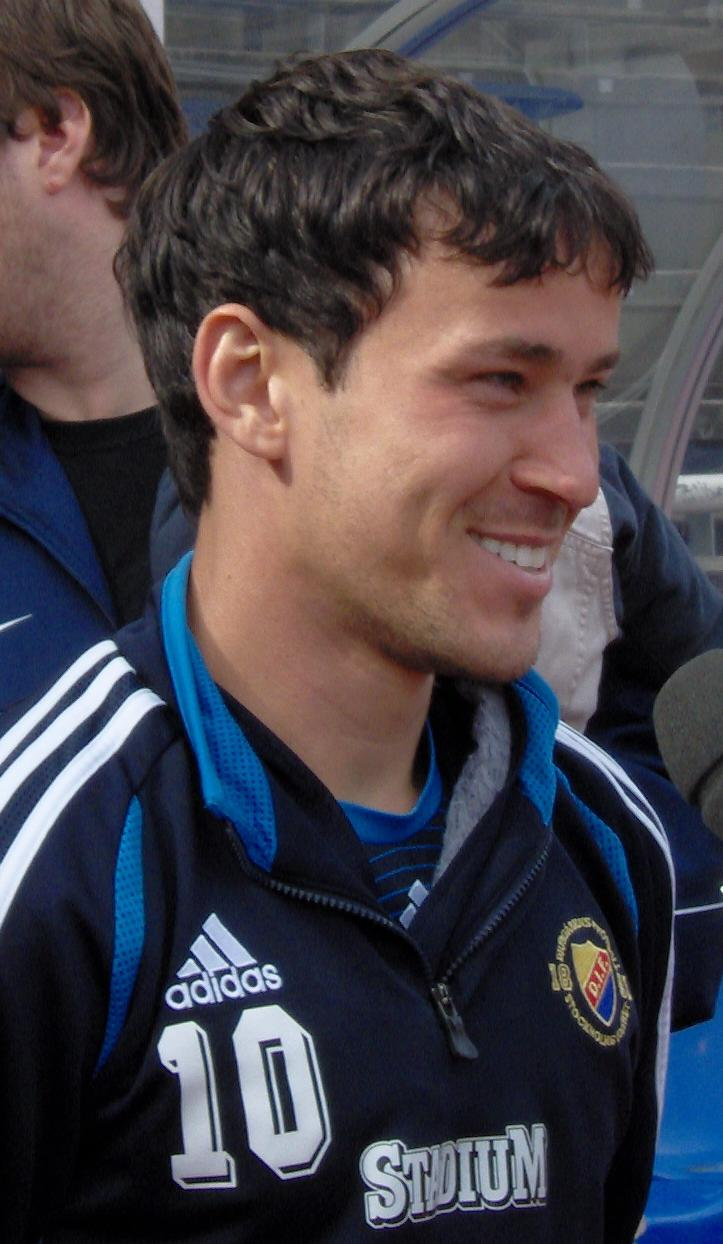

Personal information
- Date of birth: 4 May 1984 (age 42)
- Place of birth: Belo Horizonte, Brazil
- Height: 1.77 m (5 ft 9 1/2 in)
- Position: Attacking midfielder

Youth career
- Atlético Mineiro

Senior career*
Years	Team	Apps	(Gls)
2003–2005	Atlético Mineiro		
2006	Ipatinga		
2006–2008	Djurgårdens IF	62	(7)
2009–2014	Vasco da Gama	17	(1)
2010	→ Coritiba (loan)	34	(8)
2011	→ Ceará (loan)	8	(0)
2012	→ Ponte Preta (loan)	2	(0)
2014	Apollon Smyrnis	3	(0)
2015	Iraklis Psachna	20	(2)
2015	Huddinge	5	(1)
2016	Enskede	7	(1)
- * Club domestic league appearances and goals as of 30 October 2015

Enrico Cardoso Nazaré (born 4 May 1984, in Belo Horizonte), commonly known as Enrico, is a former Brazilian footballer who played as attacking midfielder.

== Early life ==
Enrico Cardoso Nazaré was born in Belo Horizonte to English teacher Rogerio and Sandra. At the age of seven, he and his twin brother Fabricio joined local team Santa Tereza.

== Playing career ==
=== Djurgården ===
In the summer of 2006, Enrico signed with Djurgårdens IF on a 3.5-year contract. Before that, he had played for the Brazilian teams Atlético Mineiro and Ipatinga. He made his debut and scored his first Djurgården goal in the 2006–07 UEFA Champions League qualifying rounds tie against MFK Ružomberok in July 2006 on Råsunda Stadium.

=== Vasco da Gama ===
In 2009, after almost three seasons as a standout for the Swedish club, Enrico returned to Brazil, signed by Vasco da Gama. That year he won the Série B. In 2010, he was loaned to Coritiba, winning the Campeonato Paranaense and the Série B. In 2011, after his loan ended, he returned to Vasco da Gama. That same year Enrico became champion again, this time winning the Copa do Brasil. A few weeks after winning the Copa do Brasil, he was loaned to Ceará until the end of the season. In 2012, Enrico was loaned again by Vasco da Gama, this time to Ponte Preta. There he played alongside Rodrigo Pimpão, who was also loaned by the carioca club.

In 2013, he returned to Vasco. Early in the year, Enrico began to feel severe pain in his left knee. Infiltration and PRP were some of the repeated procedures, but nothing worked. A more in-depth examination revealed that a bone was pressing on the fibular nerve and preventing him from making sudden movements. Vasco's medical department didn't have a specialist to take care of such a problem. The player contacted his uncle, Ronaldo Nazaré, former doctor for Cruzeiro and the national team. Only in November they found a specialist who would accept the case.

On 30 May 2014, after his contract ended, Enrico left Vasco. He was the last remaining player who won the 2009 Série B.

=== Greece ===
In the second half of 2014, Enrico signed with the Greek club Apollon Smyrnis. In early 2015, Enrico transferred to Iraklis Psachna FC, also in Greece.

=== Return to Sweden ===
In 2015, Enrico joined Huddinge. In 2016, he signed with Enskede. In 2017, Enrico ended his professional football career and started working as an agent at his sports management company.

== Career statistics ==
Club statistics
Club	Season	League			Cup		Continental		Other		Total	
Club	Season	Division	Apps	Goals	Apps	Goals	Apps	Goals	Apps	Goals	Apps	Goals
Atlético Mineiro	2003	Série A	8	1							8	1
Atlético Mineiro	2004	Série A	7	0							7	0
Atlético Mineiro	2005	Série A									0	0
Atlético Mineiro	Total		0	0	0	0	0	0	0	0	0	0
Ipatinga	2006	Série C									0	0
Ipatinga	Total		0	0	0	0	0	0	0	0	0	0
Djurgården	2006	Allsvenskan	15	0	0	0	2	1	0	0	17	1
Djurgården	2007	Allsvenskan	25	5	2	0					27	5
Djurgården	2008	Allsvenskan	22	2	2	0	4	2			28	4
Djurgården	Total		62	7	4	0	6	3	0	0	72	10
Vasco da Gama	2009	Série B	13	0	5	0			5	2	23	2
Vasco da Gama	Total		13	0	5	0	0	0	5	2	23	2
Coritiba (loan)	2010	Série B	34	8	2	0					36	8
Coritiba (loan)	Total		34	8	2	0	0	0	0	0	36	8
Vasco da Gama	2011	Série A	4	1	2	0			6	2	12	3
Vasco da Gama	Total		4	1	2	0	0	0	6	2	12	3
Ceará (loan)	2011	Série A	8	0	2	0					10	0
Ceará (loan)	Total		8	0	2	0	0	0	0	0	10	0
Ponte Preta (loan)	2012	Série A	2	0	4	3					6	3
Ponte Preta (loan)	Total		2	0	4	3	0	0	0	0	6	3
Vasco da Gama	2013	Série A									0	0
Vasco da Gama	2014	Série B									0	0
Vasco da Gama	Total		0	0	0	0	0	0	0	0	0	0
Apollon Smyrnis	2014–15	Football League	2	0	1	0					3	0
Apollon Smyrnis	Total		2	0	1	0	0	0	0	0	3	0
Career total			140	17	20	3	6	3	11	4	177	27

== Honours ==
Ipatinga

- Campeonato Mineiro (1): 2005

Vasco da Gama

- Brazilian Série B (1): 2009
- Brazilian Cup (1): 2011

Coritiba

- Campeonato Paranaense (1): 2010
- Brazilian Série B (1): 2010
