= Bo Lundquist =

Swedish sports executive

Bo Lundquist (born 1942) is a Swedish businessman and a former chairman of Djurgårdens IF Fotboll (1998–2008). Lundquist is a former vice-chairman of Swedish Football Association.

Born in Sollefteå, Sweden, he is also member of the boards of H&M, ACSC AB, Teknikmagasinet AB and the board of the Swedish School of Sport and Health Sciences (GIH).
