= Thiago Quirino =

Brazilian footballer (born 1985)

Personal information
- Full name: Thiago Quirino da Silva
- Date of birth: 4 January 1985 (age 41)
- Place of birth: Belo Horizonte, Minas Gerais, Brazil
- Height: 1.83 m (6 ft 0 in)
- Position: Striker

Team information
- Current team: Felda United
- Number: 9

Senior career*
Years	Team	Apps	(Gls)
2003–2005	Atlético Mineiro	65	(14)
2006–2008	Djurgården	53	(11)
2009–2012	Consadole Sapporo	72	(21)
2011	→ Daegu (loan)	12	(3)
2012–2013	Shonan Bellmare	30	(9)
2013–2014	→ Al-Shaab (loan)	10	(2)
2014	Ventforet Kofu	7	(0)
2015–2016	Shonan Bellmare	10	(0)
2016	→ Oita Trinita (loan)	5	(0)
2017	Anápolis FC	4	(1)
2018	Kagoshima United FC	26	(5)
2019	Felda United	1	(0)

International career
2005	Brazil U-20	12	(3)
- * Club domestic league appearances and goals as of 5 January 2019

Thiago Quirino da Silva or simply Quirino (born 4 January 1985 in Belo Horizonte) is a Brazilian football striker, who last played for Malaysian side Felda United. Quirino holds a Timor-Leste passport, which he used during the later stage of his career, but he still hasn't represented the Timor-Leste national team.

== Career ==
From 2003 to 2005, he played for Atlético Mineiro. On signing for Djurgårdens IF before the 2006 season, the club made it clear to the media and competing clubs that they had found themselves their very own "golden boy". However, Thiago's impact at Stockholms Stadion was far from impressive and during the 2006 season, he scored only one goal and was regularly used as a substitute, if at all being part of the match squad. While this may be true, it is clear to see that the transfer from the Brazilian way of futbol to the Swedish football way took its toll on his game. Quirino did score in the derby against AIK on 24 September, making it 1–0 to his side.

On 21 November 2008 it was revealed that Quirino had officially been transferred to the newly relegated J. League team Consadole Sapporo. The reported transfer sum was 2,5 million SEK, far less than the 14 million SEK it was reported that Djurgården themselves spent 3 years earlier.

On 17 January 2011, Daegu FC was officially announced his signing of a 1-year loan contract. on 23 January 2012, he loaned back to Consadole Sapporo.

In the 2019 Malaysia Super League season, he played under a Timor-Leste passport, putting him under the ASIAN player quota at Felda United.

== Career statistics ==
Updated to 23 February 2018.

Season	Club	League	League		Cup		League Cup		Continental		Total	
Season	Club	League	Apps	Goals	Apps	Goals	Apps	Goals	Apps	Goals	Apps	Goals
2006	Djurgården	Allsvenskan	18	1	3	1	-		3	0	24	2
2007	Djurgården	Allsvenskan	13	8	2	0	-		2	0	17	8
2008	Djurgården	Allsvenskan	22	2	2	0	-		2	0	26	2
2009	Consadole Sapporo	J2 League	48	19	2	1	-		-		50	20
2010	Consadole Sapporo	J2 League	17	2	0	0	-		-		17	2
2011	Daegu F.C.	K-League	12	3	1	0	2	0	-		17	3
2012	Consadole Sapporo	J1 League	7	0	0	0	4	0	-		11	0
2012	Shonan Bellmare	J2 League	17	7	1	0	-		-		18	7
2013	Shonan Bellmare	J1 League	13	2	0	0	1	0	-		14	2
2013–14	Al-Shaab	UAE PL	10	2	-		3	1	-		13	3
2014	Ventforet Kofu	J1 League	7	0	1	0	-		-		8	0
2015	Shonan Bellmare	J1 League	5	0	0	0	0	0	-		5	0
2016	Shonan Bellmare	J1 League	5	0	-		2	0	-		7	0
2016	Oita Trinita	J3 League	5	0	2	0	-		-		7	0
Career total			199	46	13	4	12	1	7	0	231	51
