= Jan Tauer =

German footballer (born 1983)

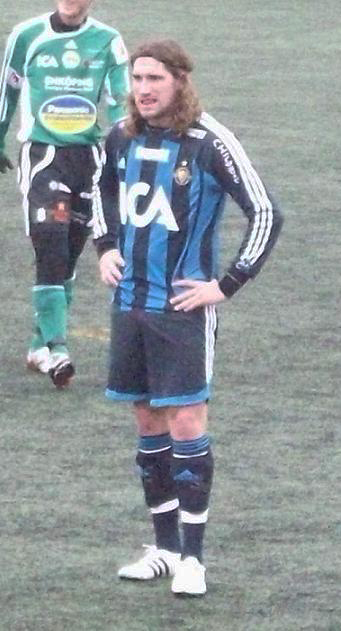
- Tauer in 2008

Personal information
- Date of birth: 26 August 1983 (age 43)
- Place of birth: Düsseldorf, Germany
- Height: 1.86 m (6 ft 1 in)
- Position: Defender

Senior career*
Years	Team	Apps	(Gls)
2001–2003	Fortuna Düsseldorf	27	(3)
2003–2004	KFC Uerdingen 05	32	(0)
2004–2007	Eintracht Braunschweig	60	(0)
2007–2009	Djurgårdens IF	57	(3)
2010–2012	VfL Osnabrück	39	(1)
2012–2013	Iraklis Psachna	12	(2)
2013	IK Brage	8	(1)
Total		235	(10)
- * Club domestic league appearances and goals

Jan Tauer (born 26 August 1983) is a German former professional footballer who played as a defender.

== Career ==
Tauer was born in Düsseldorf.

He joined Djurgårdens IF from Eintracht Braunschweig at the start of the 2007 season, and made his Allsvenskan debut for Djurgården against IF Brommapojkarna. He scored his first goal for Djurgården against IFK Göteborg when IFK midfielder Niclas Alexandersson tried to clear the ball and hit Tauer in the back, which made the ball to bounce into the goal. Tauer left Djurgården after the 2009 season and signed on 21 December 2009 for VfL Osnabrück.

== Personal life ==
In summer 2017 Tauer returned to Germany from Sweden and joined lower league club DJK Sparta Bilk.
