= Andrej Komac =

Slovenian footballer (born 1979)

Personal information
- Full name: Andrej Komac
- Date of birth: 4 December 1979 (age 46)
- Place of birth: Šempeter pri Gorici, SFR Yugoslavia
- Height: 1.75 m (5 ft 9 in)
- Position: Midfielder

Youth career
- Vodice Šempas

Senior career*
Years	Team	Apps	(Gls)
1998	Gorica	7	(0)
1999–2001	Primorje	59	(2)
2001–2002	Olimpija	24	(2)
2002–2004	Primorje	59	(4)
2004–2005	Gorica	30	(1)
2005–2006	Marítimo	7	(0)
2006	Gorica	15	(0)
2006–2009	Djurgården	71	(4)
2009–2010	Maccabi Tel Aviv	18	(0)
2010–2011	Ruch Chorzów	22	(2)
2012	Gorica	10	(0)
2012–2013	Treviso	4	(0)
2013–2014	Manzanese		
Total		326	(15)

International career
2000–2001	Slovenia U21	9	(0)
2004–2010	Slovenia	43	(0)

Managerial career
- 2019–2021: Primorje
- 2022–2023: Brda
- * Club domestic league appearances and goals

Andrej Komac (born 4 December 1979) is a Slovenian former professional footballer who played as a midfielder.

== International career ==
Komac has represented Slovenia at the under-21 level, before making his senior debut in 2004. He was selected to the final Slovenian squad for the 2010 FIFA World Cup. At the tournament, he played in two Group C matches as a late substitute and received one yellow card. Overall, he earned a total of 43 caps for Slovenia, scoring no goals.

== Honours ==
Gorica

- Slovenian First League: 2004–05, 2005–06

== See also ==
- Slovenian international players
