= Mikael Dahlberg =

Swedish footballer (born 1985)

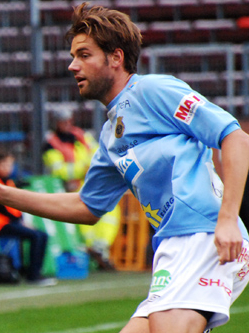

Personal information
- Full name: Mikael Andreas Dahlberg
- Date of birth: 6 March 1985 (age 41)
- Place of birth: Umeå, Sweden
- Height: 1.91 m (6 ft 3 in)
- Position: Striker

Senior career*
Years	Team	Apps	(Gls)
2002–2004	Umeå FC	31	(18)
2004–2006	GIF Sundsvall	61	(10)
2007–2009	Djurgårdens IF	73	(6)
2010–2013	Gefle IF	109	(20)
2013–2014	Apollon Smyrnis	17	(1)
2014–2018	Helsingborgs IF	60	(12)

International career
2001–2002	Sweden U17	10	(1)
2003	Sweden U19	10	(6)
2004–2006	Sweden U21	21	(6)
2009	Sweden	1	(1)
- * Club domestic league appearances and goals

Mikael Andreas Dahlberg (born 6 March 1985) is a Swedish former footballer who played as a striker.

Dahlberg began his career in Mariehem SK from Umeå. He moved to GIF Sundsvall in the 2004 season and made his Allsvenskan debut against Örebro SK on July 18, 2004. Dahlberg was capped 61 times, scoring 10 goals before moving to Djurgårdens IF in 2007. During his time in Djurgården, Dahlberg has been capped 34 times, scoring five goals for Djurgården. He has also been capped 21 times, scoring six goals for Sweden's U21 team.

On January 24, 2009, Dahlberg played for the first time for the Sweden men's national football team against USA at Sweden's "USA-tour". Dahlberg headed in a late goal for Sweden on a pass from Alexander Farnerud in the 3–2 loss against USA.

== Career statistics ==
=== International ===
List of international goals scored by Mikael Dahlberg

#	Date	Venue	Opponent	Score	Competition
1.	24 January 2009	Home Depot Center, Carson, California, United States	United States	3–2	Friendly
