= Sigurður Jónsson (footballer) =

Icelandic footballer and coach

Personal information
- Date of birth: 27 September 1966 (age 60)
- Place of birth: Akranes, Iceland
- Height: 1.85 m (6 ft 1 in)
- Position: Midfielder

Senior career*
Years	Team	Apps	(Gls)
1982–1984	IA Akranes	26	(2)
1984–1989	Sheffield Wednesday	67	(5)
1986	→ Barnsley (loan)	18	(0)
1989–1991	Arsenal	8	(1)
1992–1995	IA Akranes	56	(6)
1996–1997	Örebro SK	42	(2)
1997–2000	Dundee United	43	(1)
2000	IA Akranes	12	(3)
Total		272	(20)

International career
1983–1999	Iceland	65	(3)

Managerial career
- 2002: FH
- 2003–2005: Víkingur
- 2006: Grindavík
- 2007–2008: Djurgårdens IF
- 2010–2012: Enköpings SK
- 2014–: Kári
- * Club domestic league appearances and goals

Sigurður Jónsson (born 27 September 1966 in Akranes), also known as The Icelandic Beast (and his son as The Icelandic Beast JR), is an Icelandic former footballer player and coach.

In 2008, he featured in a ten-man shortlist for Iceland's greatest footballer of all time.

== Club career ==
Sigurður started his career at his hometown club IA Akranes before moving to English club Sheffield Wednesday in February 1985. He spent four years at Wednesday, including a brief spell on loan to Barnsley in 1986, playing 67 times for them. He made his English league debut against Leicester City in March 1985. He was signed by Arsenal in July 1989 for a fee of £475,000 and made his Arsenal debut at home against Manchester City on 14 October 1989. However his period at Arsenal was wrecked by injury and he made just ten appearances in all competitions for the London side, scoring once in the league against Queens Park Rangers in November 1989. He was part of the Arsenal side that won the old First Division in 1991 but only played in two matches, which was not enough to earn a winner's medal.

Sigurður announced his retirement in December 1991, having failed to appear in a competitive game for Arsenal since October 1990, due to a back injury. He came out of retirement to rejoin IA Akranes in 1992 and later played for Swedish club Örebro in the 1996 and 1997 Allsvenskan seasons. He signed for Scottish club Dundee United in November 1997, where again injury reduced his opportunities to play; he made 43 league appearances, scoring once against Motherwell. After having his contract terminated in April 2000, Sigurður signed for IA Akranes for the third time in his career the following month. He finally retired from playing in 2001.

== International career ==
Additionally, during his career Sigurður represented Iceland at international level 65 times, scoring three goals. He made his international debut in a Euro 84 qualifier against Malta on 5 June 1983, aged just 16 years and 251 days. He came on at half time in a 1–0 win. This made him the youngest player to have appeared in a European Championship qualifier, a record he held until it was taken by Martin Ødegaard of Norway in 2014. He played his last game for the national team on 9 September 1999 against Ukraine.

== Coaching career ==
As a coach, he had spells with FH, Vikingur and Grindavík, before being appointed Djurgården manager in November 2006. In 2010, he signed on as Enköping manager.

== Honours ==
- FA Charity Shield: 1991 (shared)
- Årets Järnkamin: 2007
