= Kebba Ceesay =

Gambian footballer

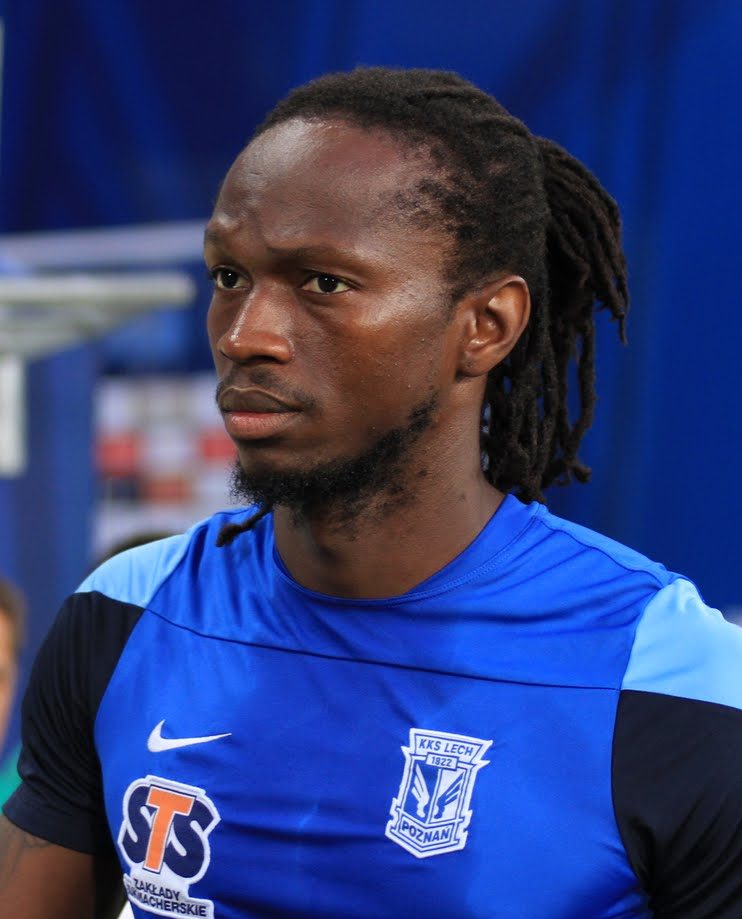
- Ceesay with Lech Poznań

Personal information
- Date of birth: 14 November 1987 (age 39)
- Place of birth: Bakau, Gambia
- Height: 1.80 m (5 ft 11 in)
- Position: Defender

Youth career
- IK Brage

Senior career*
Years	Team	Apps	(Gls)
2005–2006	IK Brage	26	(0)
2007–2012	Djurgårdens IF	102	(1)
2008	→ Vasalunds IF (loan)	6	(0)
2012–2016	Lech Poznań	53	(2)
2013–2015	Lech Poznań II	5	(0)
2016–2017	Djurgårdens IF	14	(0)
2017–2018	Dalkurd FF	52	(1)
2019–2021	IK Sirius	31	(1)
2020	→ Helsingborgs IF (loan)	12	(0)
2021	Vasalunds IF	23	(0)
2022	Nordic United FC	15	(0)
2023	Vasalunds IF	4	(0)

International career
2006–2007	Sweden U21	2	(0)
2007–2016	Gambia	12	(0)
- * Club domestic league appearances and goals

Kebba Ceesay (born 14 November 1987) is a Gambian former professional footballer who played as a defender. He also holds Swedish nationality.

== Career ==
Ceesay joined Djurgården from IK Brage at the start of the 2007 season, and made his Allsvenskan debut for Djurgården in the Stockholm derby against Hammarby IF on 13 August 2007. He usually plays as a right back even though he personally considers himself to be a central defender. Ceesay visited English side Notts County for a trial in November 2009, but no transfer was made. Ceesay made his debut for Gambia against Namibia playing with fellow Djurgården player Pa Dembo Touray. With his contract ending after the 2012 season he declared that he wouldn't accept sitting on the bench at Djurgården. He received a contract offer from Major League Soccer club Portland Timbers but instead chose to sign with Polish club Lech Poznań in August 2012. On 18 July 2016, he returned to Djurgårdens IF on a two-and-a-half-year deal.

On 13 November 2018, it was announced that Ceesay had signed with IK Sirius and would join the club for the 2019 season on a one-year contract.

== Career statistics ==
=== Club ===
As of 29 November 2017

Appearances and goals by club, season and competition
Club	Season	League			National cup (Note: Includes Polish Cup, Svenska Cupen)		Europe		Other		Total	
Club	Season	Division	Apps	Goals	Apps	Goals	Apps	Goals	Apps	Goals	Apps	Goals
Lech Poznań	2012–13	Ekstraklasa	25	2	1	0	1 (Note: Appearance(s) in UEFA Europa League)	0	—		27	2
Lech Poznań	2013–14	Ekstraklasa	8	0	1	0	1	0	—		10	0
Lech Poznań	2014–15	Ekstraklasa	2	0	3	0	0	0	—		5	0
Lech Poznań	2015–16	Ekstraklasa	18	0	4	0	4 (Note: Two appearances in UEFA Champions League, two appearances in UEFA Europa League)	0	1 (Note: Appearance in Polish Super Cup)	0	27	0
Lech Poznań	Total		53	2	9	0	6	0	1	0	69	2
Djurgårdens IF	2016	Allsvenskan	14	0	4	0	—		—		18	0
Dalkurd FF	2017	Superettan	28	0	0	0	—		—		28	0
Career total			95	2	13	0	6	0	1	0	115	2

== Honours ==
Lech Poznań

- Ekstraklasa: 2014–15
- Polish Super Cup: 2015
