= Toni Kuivasto =

Finnish footballer (born 1975)

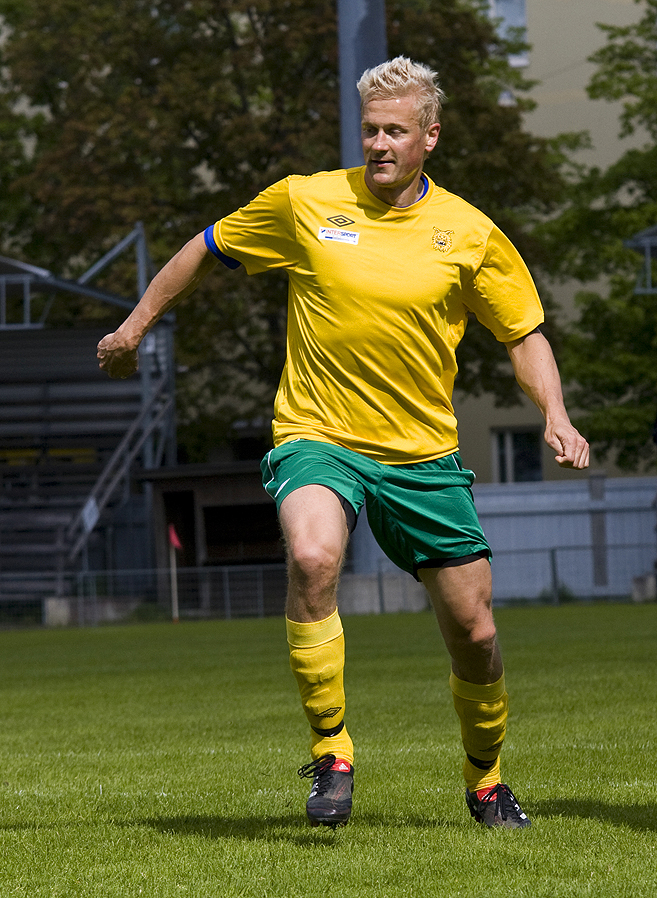
- Kuivasto in a charity match in 2010

Personal information
- Full name: Toni Tapio Kuivasto
- Date of birth: 31 December 1975 (age 50)
- Place of birth: Tampere, Finland
- Height: 1.88 m (6 ft 2 in)
- Position: Defender

Youth career
- Ilves

Senior career*
Years	Team	Apps	(Gls)
1992–1996	Ilves	77	(5)
1997–1998	MyPa	46	(2)
1999–2000	HJK	60	(2)
2001–2003	Viking	62	(4)
2003–2009	Djurgården	165	(6)
2010	Haka	21	(0)
2012–2013	Ilves/2		
2014	Ilves/3		

International career
?	Finland U-21	11	(?)
1997–2009	Finland	75	(1)
- * Club domestic league appearances and goals

Toni Tapio Kuivasto (born 31 December 1975) is a retired Finnish footballer who last played for Veikkausliigaside Haka.

== Club career ==
Kuivasto started his career at home-town club FC Ilves, making his Veikkausliiga debut in 1992. He also played for MyPa and HJK Helsinki in Finland, before moving abroad to play for Viking FK of the Norwegian Tippeligaen in 2001. After a few years in Norway he wanted new challenges, and he was bought by Djurgården in the summer of 2003. Kuivasto has helped Djurgården to two Swedish championships and two Swedish Cups. Kuivasto returned to Finland for the 2010 season after spending 10 years abroad. He signed a one-year contract with FC Haka. He managed to score a vital goal for his team in his second game for Haka, in a league cup match against VPS.

After his contract with Haka expired after the 2010 season, he became a free agent. On 4 November 2011 it was announced that the 35-year-old Kuivasto would retire due his knee problems. He is currently studying to become a youth coach.

== International career ==
Kuivasto made his debut for the Finland national team on 21 February 1997 against Malaysia. He made his last national appearance on 1 April 2009 as he played 23 minutes in a friendly against Norway. He made in total of 75 national caps and scored one goal.

== Career statistics ==
As of 1 September 2024.

Appearances and goals by club, season and competition
Club	Season	League			Cup (Note: Includes Suomen Cup)		League cup		Europe		Total	
Club	Season	Division	Apps	Goals	Apps	Goals	Apps	Goals	Apps	Goals	Apps	Goals
Ilves	1992	Veikkausliiga	9	0	–		–		–		9	0
Ilves	1993	Veikkausliiga	1	0	–		–		–		1	0
Ilves	1994	Veikkausliiga	22	1	–		–		–		22	1
Ilves	1995	Veikkausliiga	23	1	–		–		–		23	1
Ilves	1996	Veikkausliiga	22	3	–		–		–		22	3
Ilves	Total		77	5	0	0	0	0	0	0	77	5
MYPA	1997	Veikkausliiga	27	1	–		–		2 (Note: Appearances in UEFA Cup)	0	29	1
MYPA	1998	Veikkausliiga	19	1	–		–		–		19	1
MYPA	Total		46	2	0	0	0	0	2	0	48	2
HJK Helsinki	1999	Veikkausliiga	28	1	–		–		4	0	32	1
HJK Helsinki	2000	Veikkausliiga	32	1	1	0	–		4	0	37	1
HJK Helsinki	Total		60	2	1	0	0	0	8	0	69	2
Viking	2001	Tippeligaen	25	0	6	1	–		6	0	37	1
Viking	2002	Tippeligaen	26	3	4	0	–		4	0	34	3
Viking	2003	Tippeligaen	11	3	3	1	–		–		14	4
Viking	Total		62	6	13	2	0	0	10	0	85	8
Djurgården	2003	Allsvenskan	13	1	0	0	–		2 (Note: Appearances in UEFA Champions League)	0	15	1
Djurgården	2004	Allsvenskan	24	0	1	0	–		6 (Note: Appearances in UEFA Champions League and UEFA Cup)	0	31	0
Djurgården	2005	Allsvenskan	26	3	1	1	–		2	0	29	4
Djurgården	2006	Allsvenskan	23	0	–		–		2	0	25	0
Djurgården	2007	Allsvenskan	26	1	–		–		–		26	1
Djurgården	2008	Allsvenskan	24	0	–		–		3	0	27	0
Djurgården	2009	Allsvenskan	31	1	1	0	–		–		32	1
Djurgården	Total		167	6	3	1	0	0	15	0	185	7
Haka	2010	Veikkausliiga	21	0	2	0	0	0	–		23	0
Career total			433	21	19	3	0	0	35	0	487	24

=== International ===
As of match played 1 April 2009

Finland
Year	Apps	Goals
1997	4	0
1998	2	0
1999	5	0
2000	4	0
2001	7	0
2002	10	0
2003	9	0
2004	11	0
2005	10	1
2006	4	0
2007	3	0
2008	4	0
2009	2	0
Total	75	1

=== International goals ===
As of match played 18 March 2005. Finland score listed first, score column indicates score after each Kuivasto goal.

List of international goals scored by Toni Kuivasto
No.	Date	Venue	Opponent	Score	Result	Competition
1	18 March 2005	Prince Mohamed bin Fahd Stadium, Dammam, Saudi Arabia	Saudi Arabia	4–1	4–1	Friendly

== Honours ==
HJK

- Suomen Cup: 2000

Viking FK

- Norwegian Cup: 2001

Djurgårdens IF

- Allsvenskan (2): 2003, 2005
- Svenska Cupen (2): 2004, 2005
