= List of Swedish football transfers winter 2009–10 =

This is a list of Swedish football transfers in the winter transfer window 2009–2010 by club.

Only transfers in and out between 1 January – 31 March 2010 of the Allsvenskan and Superettan are included.

== Allsvenskan ==
=== AIK ===
In: Note: Flags indicate national team as defined under FIFA eligibility rules; some limited exceptions apply. Players may hold more than one non-FIFA nationality.

No.	Pos.	Nation	Player
—	DF	SWE	Martin Lorentzson (from Assyriska)
—	MF	SWE	Jacob Ericsson (from Carlstad United BK)
—	DF	SWE	Niklas Backman (from FC Väsby United)
—	MF	URU	Sebastián Eguren (from Villarreal CF)
—	GK	CAN	Kyriakos Stamatopoulos (on loan from Tromsø IL)
—	FW	BRA	Clecio (on loan from Morrinhos FC)

Out: Note: Flags indicate national team as defined under FIFA eligibility rules; some limited exceptions apply. Players may hold more than one non-FIFA nationality.

No.	Pos.	Nation	Player
—	GK	SWE	Daniel Örlund (to Rosenborg BK)
—	FW	SWE	Mikael Thorstensson (to Assyriska)
—	FW	ARG	Iván Obolo (to Arsenal de Sarandí)
—	DF	SWE	Markus Jonsson (free transfer)
—	DF	NED	Jos Hooiveld (to Celtic)
—	FW	SWE	Yussuf Saleh (on loan to Syrianska FC)

=== BK Häcken ===
In: Note: Flags indicate national team as defined under FIFA eligibility rules; some limited exceptions apply. Players may hold more than one non-FIFA nationality.

No.	Pos.	Nation	Player
—	FW	GHA	Abdul Majeed Waris (from Hartpury College)
—	DF	SWE	Kyle Konwea (from Qviding FIF)
—	FW	BRA	Kayke Rodrigues (on loan from C.R. Flamengo)

Out: Note: Flags indicate national team as defined under FIFA eligibility rules; some limited exceptions apply. Players may hold more than one non-FIFA nationality.

No.	Pos.	Nation	Player
—	MF	FIN	Janne Saarinen (to HJK)
—	FW	SWE	Jacob Johansson (to HJK)
—	MF	SWE	Philip Lundin (to HJK)
—	DF	FIN	Robin Wikman (to Hammarby IF)

=== Djurgårdens IF ===
In: Note: Flags indicate national team as defined under FIFA eligibility rules; some limited exceptions apply. Players may hold more than one non-FIFA nationality.

No.	Pos.	Nation	Player
—	MF	SWE	Martin Andersson (loan return from Vasalunds IF)
—	DF	FIN	Jani Lyyski (from IFK Mariehamn)
—	FW	NGA	Kennedy Igboananike (from Vasalunds IF)
—	MF	FIN	Joel Perovuo (from FC Honka)
—	MF	FIN	Kasper Hämäläinen (from TPS)
—	DF	FIN	Joona Toivio (from AZ Alkmaar)
—	DF	SRB	Danilo Kuzmanović (from FK Rad)
—	MF	SWE	Sharbel Touma (free agent)

Out: Note: Flags indicate national team as defined under FIFA eligibility rules; some limited exceptions apply. Players may hold more than one non-FIFA nationality.

No.	Pos.	Nation	Player
—	DF	SWE	Markus Johannesson (retires)
—	DF	FIN	Toni Kuivasto (free transfer)
—	DF	GER	Jan Tauer (to VfL Osnabrück)
—	GK	SWE	Oskar Wahlström (retires) (Note: "Oskar Wahlström slutar" (in Swedish). dif.se. 2009-12-10.)
—	MF	SWE	Stefan Batan (free transfer)
—	DF	SWE	Dennis Boskailo (free transfer)
—	MF	SWE	Christoffer Karlsson (free transfer)
—	MF	ARG	Leandro Ortiz (loan return to River Plate)
—	FW	SWE	Mikael Dahlberg (to Gefle IF)
—	MF	SWE	Dan Burlin (loan return to Skellefteå FF) (Note: "Ingen förlängning med Burlin" (in Swedish). dif.se. 2009-12-17.)
—	DF	SWE	Peter Magnusson (free transfer)
—	FW	ZAM	Boyd Mwila (on loan to FC Trollhättan) (Note: "Mwila till Trollhättan" (in Swedish). dif.se. 2010-03-13.)

=== GAIS ===
In: Note: Flags indicate national team as defined under FIFA eligibility rules; some limited exceptions apply. Players may hold more than one non-FIFA nationality.

No.	Pos.	Nation	Player
—	DF	ISL	Guðmundur Gunnarsson (loan return from KR Reykjavíkur)
—	MF	SWE	Daniel Nicklasson (loan return from Mjällby AIF)
—	GK	FIN	Henri Sillanpää (from VPS)
—	MF	ENG	Kyle Patterson (from Los Angeles Galaxy)
—	FW	SWE	Joel Johansson (on loan from IF Elfsborg)
—	FW	NOR	Aram Khalili (on loan from IK Start)

Out: Note: Flags indicate national team as defined under FIFA eligibility rules; some limited exceptions apply. Players may hold more than one non-FIFA nationality.

No.	Pos.	Nation	Player
—	FW	SWE	Pär Ericsson (to IFK Göteborg)
—	MF	SWE	Daniel Nicklasson (to Mjällby AIF)
—	FW	SWE	Tobias Holmqvist (loan return to Helsingborgs IF)
—	DF	SWE	Mikael Dahlgren (to Ängelholms FF)
—	MF	SWE	Mattias Lindström (to Helsingborgs IF)
—	DF	SWE	Andreas Tobiasson (to Ljungskile SK) (Note: "Andreas Tobiasson klar för Ljungskile" (in Swedish). lsk.se. 2010-02-02.)

=== Gefle IF ===
In: Note: Flags indicate national team as defined under FIFA eligibility rules; some limited exceptions apply. Players may hold more than one non-FIFA nationality.

No.	Pos.	Nation	Player
—	FW	SWE	Jakob Orlov (from Skövde AIK)
—	MF	TAN	Haruna Moshi (from Simba SC)
—	MF	NOR	Øyvind Gram (from Aalesunds FK)
—	MF	SWE	James Frempong (from Örebro SK)
—	DF	SWE	Sebastian Senatore (from Vasalunds IF)
—	DF	FIN	Jens Portin (from FF Jaro)
—	FW	SWE	Mikael Dahlberg (from Djurgårdens IF)

Out: Note: Flags indicate national team as defined under FIFA eligibility rules; some limited exceptions apply. Players may hold more than one non-FIFA nationality.

No.	Pos.	Nation	Player
—	MF	SWE	Johannes Ericsson (retire)
—	MF	COD	Yannick Bapupa (to Kalmar FF)
—	DF	SWE	Andreas Dahlén (to F.C. Hansa Rostock)
—	DF	SWE	Linus Bolin (free transfer)

=== Halmstads BK ===
In: Note: Flags indicate national team as defined under FIFA eligibility rules; some limited exceptions apply. Players may hold more than one non-FIFA nationality.

No.	Pos.	Nation	Player
—	GK	SWE	Robin Malmqvist (from Östers IF)
—	DF	USA	Ryan Miller (from Ljungskile SK)
—	MF	USA	Michael Thomas (from San Jose Earthquakes)

Out: Note: Flags indicate national team as defined under FIFA eligibility rules; some limited exceptions apply. Players may hold more than one non-FIFA nationality.

No.	Pos.	Nation	Player
—	MF	FIN	Tim Sparv (to Groningen)
—	MF	CHA	Azrack Mahamat (loan return to RCD Espanyol B)
—	GK	FIN	Magnus Bahne (free transfer)
—	FW	SWE	Ajsel Kujović (free transfer)
—	DF	SWE	Emil Jensen (free transfer)
—	MF	SWE	Sebastian Johansson (to Örgryte IS)

=== Helsingborgs IF ===
In: Note: Flags indicate national team as defined under FIFA eligibility rules; some limited exceptions apply. Players may hold more than one non-FIFA nationality.

No.	Pos.	Nation	Player
—	FW	SWE	Tobias Holmqvist (loan return from GAIS)
—	MF	NOR	Ardian Gashi (from Fredrikstad FK)
—	MF	SWE	Mattias Lindström (from GAIS)
—	DF	SWE	Erik Edman (from Wigan Athletic F.C.)
—	FW	NED	Rachid Bouaouzan (on loan from Wigan Athletic F.C.)

Out: Note: Flags indicate national team as defined under FIFA eligibility rules; some limited exceptions apply. Players may hold more than one non-FIFA nationality.

No.	Pos.	Nation	Player
—	DF	SWE	Andreas Landgren (to Udinese)
—	FW	SWE	Henrik Larsson (retire)
—	MF	NGA	Yakubu Alfa (to K.F.C. Germinal Beerschot)
—	MF	FIN	Fredrik Svanbäck (to Landskrona BoIS)
—	MF	ISL	Ólafur Skúlason (free transfer)
—	MF	SWE	Mathias Unkuri (to Landskrona BoIS) (Note: "Mathias Unkuri klar" (in Swedish). landskronabois.com. 2010-01-15.)
—	DF	MLI	Adama Tamboura (to FC Metz)
—	MF	ZAM	Isaac Chansa (to Orlando Pirates FC)
—	GK	SWE	Daniel Andersson (to Ängelholms FF)

=== IF Brommapojkarna ===
In: Note: Flags indicate national team as defined under FIFA eligibility rules; some limited exceptions apply. Players may hold more than one non-FIFA nationality.

No.	Pos.	Nation	Player
—	DF	DEN	Mikkel Jensen (from Hammarby IF)
—	DF	SWE	Ferhat Korkmaz (from Vasalunds IF)
—	MF	SWE	Babis Stefanidis (from Malmö FF)
—	DF	SWE	Pontus Segerström (from Stabæk)
—	DF	SWE	André Möllestam (from U.S. Lecce)
—	FW	SWE	Marcus Irestam (from Spårvägens FF)
—	FW	SWE	John Guidetti (on loan from Manchester City F.C.)

Out: Note: Flags indicate national team as defined under FIFA eligibility rules; some limited exceptions apply. Players may hold more than one non-FIFA nationality.

No.	Pos.	Nation	Player
—	DF	SWE	Markus Karlsson (retire)
—	FW	SWE	Mikael Nilsson (to Valsta Syrianska IK)
—	DF	SWE	Max Clauss (Akropolis IF)
—	DF	SWE	Jon Persson (free transfer)
—	MF	SWE	Anders Bååth-Sjöblom (to Syrianska FC)
—	MF	SWE	Philip Haglund (to SC Heerenveen)
—	FW	SWE	Marcus Irestam (On loan to Gröndals IK)
—	FW	SWE	David Carlsson (to Gröndals IK)
—	MF	SWE	Labinot Kelmendi (Lyckeby GoIF)
—	DF	SWE	Richard Henriksson (retire)

=== IF Elfsborg ===
In: Note: Flags indicate national team as defined under FIFA eligibility rules; some limited exceptions apply. Players may hold more than one non-FIFA nationality.

No.	Pos.	Nation	Player
—	DF	SWE	Johan Sjöberg (loan return from Örgryte IS) (Note: "Sjöberg skall hjälpa Örgryte kvar i allsvenskan" (in Swedish). Elfsborg.se. 2009-06-02.)
—	FW	SWE	Fredrik Berglund (loan return from Stabæk)
—	DF	SWE	Marcus Falk-Olander (loan return from Trelleborgs FF)

Out: Note: Flags indicate national team as defined under FIFA eligibility rules; some limited exceptions apply. Players may hold more than one non-FIFA nationality.

No.	Pos.	Nation	Player
—	MF	ISL	Helgi Daníelsson (to FC Hansa Rostock) (Note: "Helgi Danielsson lämnar IF Elfsborg för Tyskland" (in Swedish). elfsborg.se. 2010-01-22.)
—	DF	SWE	Jesper Arvidsson (on loan to Åtvidabergs FF)
—	DF	SWE	Marcus Falk-Olander (to Norrby IF) (Note: "Landslagsmeriterad spelare klar för Norrby!" (in Swedish). proteamonline.se. 2010-01-11.)

=== IFK Göteborg ===
In: Note: Flags indicate national team as defined under FIFA eligibility rules; some limited exceptions apply. Players may hold more than one non-FIFA nationality.

No.	Pos.	Nation	Player
—	FW	SWE	Hannes Stiller (from Qviding FIF)
—	FW	SWE	Pär Ericsson (from GAIS)
—	MF	SWE	Alexander Faltsetas (from FC Trollhättan)
—	DF	SWE	Fredrik Risp (free transfer)

Out: Note: Flags indicate national team as defined under FIFA eligibility rules; some limited exceptions apply. Players may hold more than one non-FIFA nationality.

No.	Pos.	Nation	Player
—	FW	SWE	Mathias Etéus (to Jönköpings Södra IF)
—	FW	SWE	Daniel Alexandersson (to Falkenbergs FF)

=== Kalmar FF ===
In: Note: Flags indicate national team as defined under FIFA eligibility rules; some limited exceptions apply. Players may hold more than one non-FIFA nationality.

No.	Pos.	Nation	Player
—	DF	FIN	Paulus Arajuuri (from IFK Mariehamn)
—	MF	NIR	Daryl Smylie (loan return from Jönköpings Södra)
—	MF	COD	Yannick Bapupa (from Gefle IF)
—	FW	BRA	Jael Ferreira Vieira (from Bahia)
—	MF	USA	Johann Smith (from NK Rijeka)

Out: Note: Flags indicate national team as defined under FIFA eligibility rules; some limited exceptions apply. Players may hold more than one non-FIFA nationality.

No.	Pos.	Nation	Player
—	DF	SWE	Tobias Carlsson (free transfer)
—	MF	SWE	Lasse Johansson (free transfer)
—	DF	SWE	Mikael Eklund (to Assyriska)
—	MF	SWE	Joakim Karlsson (free transfer)
—	FW	SWE	Marcus Mårtensson (free transfer)
—	DF	SWE	Petter Lennartsson (on loan to Jönköpings Södra)
—	MF	BRA	Reinaldo da Silva (loan returns to Palmeiras)

=== Malmö FF ===
In: Note: Flags indicate national team as defined under FIFA eligibility rules; some limited exceptions apply. Players may hold more than one non-FIFA nationality.

No.	Pos.	Nation	Player
—	MF	SWE	Robin Nilsson (Return from loan at Ängelholms FF)
—	DF	CMR	Joseph Elanga (from Brøndby IF)

Out: Note: Flags indicate national team as defined under FIFA eligibility rules; some limited exceptions apply. Players may hold more than one non-FIFA nationality.

No.	Pos.	Nation	Player
—	GK	SWE	Jonas Sandqvist (to Atromitos F.C.)
—	DF	BRA	Gabriel de Paulo Limeira (to Manisaspor)
—	MF	SWE	Babis Stefanidis (to IF Brommapojkarna)
—	DF	SWE	Anes Mravac (on loan to Lilla Torg FF)
—	MF	SWE	Robin Nilsson (on loan to Ängelholms FF)

=== Mjällby AIF ===
In: Note: Flags indicate national team as defined under FIFA eligibility rules; some limited exceptions apply. Players may hold more than one non-FIFA nationality.

No.	Pos.	Nation	Player
—	DF	SWE	Jesper Westerberg (from Landskrona BoIS)
—	MF	NZL	Craig Henderson (from Dartmouth Big Green)
—	MF	SWE	Daniel Nicklasson (from GAIS)
—	MF	SWE	Tobias Grahn (from Randers FC)
—	MF	RUS	Pyotr Gitselov (from FC Rubin Kazan)
—	FW	NED	Moestafa El Kabir (from N.E.C.)

Out: Note: Flags indicate national team as defined under FIFA eligibility rules; some limited exceptions apply. Players may hold more than one non-FIFA nationality.

No.	Pos.	Nation	Player
—	MF	SWE	Tobias Johansson (free transfer)
—	MF	SWE	Robin Kacaniklic (free transfer)
—	FW	FIN	Jukka Santala (free transfer) (Note: "Pengarna avgör i Maif" (in Swedish). sydostran.se. 2009-11-07.)

=== Trelleborgs FF ===
In: Note: Flags indicate national team as defined under FIFA eligibility rules; some limited exceptions apply. Players may hold more than one non-FIFA nationality.

No.	Pos.	Nation	Player
—	DF	SWE	Johan Nilsson Guiomar (Kongsvinger IL)
—	FW	SWE	Mattias Adelstam (from Ängelholms FF)
—	DF	SWE	Philip Milenkovic (from Malmö FF)

Out: Note: Flags indicate national team as defined under FIFA eligibility rules; some limited exceptions apply. Players may hold more than one non-FIFA nationality.

No.	Pos.	Nation	Player
—	MF	SWE	Mattias Thylander (free transfer)
—	DF	SWE	Mikael Bengtsson (to Landskrona BoIS)
—	DF	SWE	Marcus Falk-Olander (Return from loan to IF Elfsborg)
—	DF	SWE	Jens Sloth (to Höörs IS)
—	DF	SWE	Mattias Nylund (free transfer)
—	MF	POR	Paulino Lopes Tavares (free transfer)
—	FW	SWE	Emil Mårtensson (to Karlstad BK)
—	MF	SWE	Rasmus Östman (on loan to IK Brage)

=== Åtvidabergs FF ===
In: Note: Flags indicate national team as defined under FIFA eligibility rules; some limited exceptions apply. Players may hold more than one non-FIFA nationality.

No.	Pos.	Nation	Player
—	MF	NGA	Prince Efe Ehiorobo (from Løv-Ham Fotball)
—	MF	NGA	Etuwe Prince Eboagwu (from Đồng Tâm Long An F.C.)
—	GK	SWE	Gustav Jansson (from Värmbols FC)
—	MF	SWE	Christoffer Karlsson (free transfer)
—	FW	FIN	Paulus Roiha (from HJK Helsinki)
—	DF	SWE	Jesper Arvidsson (on loan from IF Elfsborg)

Out: Note: Flags indicate national team as defined under FIFA eligibility rules; some limited exceptions apply. Players may hold more than one non-FIFA nationality.

No.	Pos.	Nation	Player
—	MF	NGA	Prince Efe Ehiorobo (contract terminated (medical reasons))
—	MF	SWE	Daniel Lundqvist (free transfer)

=== Örebro SK ===
In: Note: Flags indicate national team as defined under FIFA eligibility rules; some limited exceptions apply. Players may hold more than one non-FIFA nationality.

No.	Pos.	Nation	Player
—	MF	SWE	Simon Leonidsson (from BK Forward) (Note: "Adriano klar för ÖSK fotboll" (in Swedish). orebro-sk.se. 2009-07-29.)
—	FW	BRA	Paulinho Guará (on loan from Busan I'Park)

Out: Note: Flags indicate national team as defined under FIFA eligibility rules; some limited exceptions apply. Players may hold more than one non-FIFA nationality.

No.	Pos.	Nation	Player
—	MF	SWE	James Frempong (to Gefle IF)
—	DF	SWE	Glenn Holgersson (free transfer)
—	FW	BRA	Adriano Munoz (free transfer)
—	MF	SWE	Robert Walker (free transfer)
—	GK	SWE	Peter Rosendal (free transfer)

== Superettan ==
=== Assyriska FF ===
In: Note: Flags indicate national team as defined under FIFA eligibility rules; some limited exceptions apply. Players may hold more than one non-FIFA nationality.

No.	Pos.	Nation	Player
—	DF	SWE	Gustaf Segerström (from IK Sirius)
—	DF	SWE	Richard Jansson (to Ljungskile SK)
—	DF	SWE	David Björkeryd (to Qviding FIF)
—	MF	SWE	Marco Kotilainen (from Gunnilse IS)
—	MF	SWE	Mikael Eklund (from Kalmar FF)
—	FW	SWE	Mikael Thorstensson (from AIK)
—	MF	SWE	Stefan Batan (from Djurgårdens IF)
—	GK	FIN	Magnus Bahne (free transfer)
—	MF	SWE	Haris Laitinen (free transfer)
—	MF	TUR	Ceyhun Eriş (from Denizlispor)
—	GK	SWE	Kristoffer Björklund (from Hammarby IF)
—	DF	SWE	Pierre Bengtsson (free transfer)

Out: Note: Flags indicate national team as defined under FIFA eligibility rules; some limited exceptions apply. Players may hold more than one non-FIFA nationality.

No.	Pos.	Nation	Player
—	DF	SWE	Martin Lorentzson (to AIK)
—	DF	SWE	Filip Bergman (free transfer)
—	DF	SWE	Pierre Bengtsson (free transfer)
—	DF	SWE	Lamin Conateh (free transfer)
—	FW	BRA	Tiago Pereira (free transfer)
—	DF	BRA	Daniel Lopes dos Santos (free transfer)
—	MF	NOR	Petter Furuseth (loan return to FC Lyn)

=== Degerfors IF ===
In: Note: Flags indicate national team as defined under FIFA eligibility rules; some limited exceptions apply. Players may hold more than one non-FIFA nationality.

No.	Pos.	Nation	Player
—	MF	SWE	Stellan Carlsson (Karlslunds IF)
—	MF	SWE	Andreas Ljunggren-Eriksson (Enköpings SK)

Out: Note: Flags indicate national team as defined under FIFA eligibility rules; some limited exceptions apply. Players may hold more than one non-FIFA nationality.

No.	Pos.	Nation	Player
—	MF	SWE	Fredrik Crona (free transfer)
—	DF	SWE	Johan Larsson (to IFK Ölme) (Note: "Ölme har gjort klart med spelare från Degerfors och Skattkärr" (in Swedish). vf.se. 2009-12-17.)
—	FW	SWE	Mario Simunovic (to Carlstad United BK)

=== Falkenbergs FF ===
In: Note: Flags indicate national team as defined under FIFA eligibility rules; some limited exceptions apply. Players may hold more than one non-FIFA nationality.

No.	Pos.	Nation	Player
—	MF	SWE	Christoffer Carlsson (from Landskrona BoIS)
—	DF	SWE	Emil Jensen (from Halmstads BK)
—	FW	SWE	Daniel Alexandersson (from IFK Göteborg)

Out: Note: Flags indicate national team as defined under FIFA eligibility rules; some limited exceptions apply. Players may hold more than one non-FIFA nationality.

No.	Pos.	Nation	Player
—	MF	SWE	Jonas Cullsjö (to Varbergs BoIS)
—	MF	SWE	Kristoffer Fagercrantz (to Jönköpings Södra IF)
—	DF	SWE	Jens Gustafsson (retire)
—	DF	SWE	Björn Carlsson (IS Halmia)

=== FC Trollhättan ===
In: Note: Flags indicate national team as defined under FIFA eligibility rules; some limited exceptions apply. Players may hold more than one non-FIFA nationality.

No.	Pos.	Nation	Player
—	MF	SWE	Robert Davidsson (Skoftebyns IF)
—	FW	ZAM	Boyd Mwila (on loan from Djurgårdens IF) (Note: "Mwila till Trollhättan" (in Swedish). dif.se. 2010-03-13.)
—	DF	SWE	Robin Eriksson (from Lindome GIF)
—	MF	SWE	Viktor Sköld (from IF Elfsborg)
—	MF	SWE	Petrit Zhubi (from IK Oddevold)

Out: Note: Flags indicate national team as defined under FIFA eligibility rules; some limited exceptions apply. Players may hold more than one non-FIFA nationality.

No.	Pos.	Nation	Player
—	MF	SWE	Alexander Faltsetas (to IFK Göteborg)
—	DF	SWE	Darko Matijevic (free transfer)
—	MF	SWE	Olof Hvidén-Watson (free transfer)
—	MF	SWE	Karl Johansson (free transfer)
—	MF	SWE	Martin Bäckström (free transfer)
—	DF	SWE	Henric Svensson (free transfer)
—	MF	SWE	Daniel Andersson (free transfer)
—	FW	SWE	Mathias Etéus (loan return to IFK Göteborg)

=== FC Väsby United ===
In: Note: Flags indicate national team as defined under FIFA eligibility rules; some limited exceptions apply. Players may hold more than one non-FIFA nationality.

No.	Pos.	Nation	Player
—	MF	SWE	Daniel Ålund (from IF Brommapojkarna) (Note: "Daniel Ålund klar för Väsby" (in Swedish). vasby-fotboll.nu.)
—	MF	SWE	Patrik Pupparo (from Enskede IK) (Note: "Patrik Pupparo skriver på för Väsby United" (in Swedish). vasby-fotboll.nu.)
—	MF	SWE	Jonatan Lundevall (from IK Brage)
—	GK	SWE	Peter Rosendal (on loan from Örebro SK) (Note: "Väsby lånar målvakt" (in Swedish). vasby-fotboll.nu.)

Out: Note: Flags indicate national team as defined under FIFA eligibility rules; some limited exceptions apply. Players may hold more than one non-FIFA nationality.

No.	Pos.	Nation	Player
—	DF	SWE	Daniel Johansson (free transfer) (Note: "Daniel Johansson har spelat färdigt i Väsby" (in Swedish). vasby-fotboll.nu.)
—	DF	SWE	Peter Motas (free transfer)
—	DF	SWE	Niklas Backman (to AIK)
—	DF	SWE	Daniel Johansson (free transfer) (Note: "Daniel Johansson har spelat färdigt i Väsby" (in Swedish). vasby-fotboll.nu.)
—	GK	SWE	Niklas Westberg (to IFK Norrköping)
—	MF	SWE	Robin Wiksten (to Täby IS)
—	FW	SWE	Loan Shaharian (to Täby IS)
—	GK	SWE	Mikael Forsbeck (to Bollstanäs SK)
—	MF	NGA	Obi Etie (to Syrianska FC)

=== GIF Sundsvall ===
In: Note: Flags indicate national team as defined under FIFA eligibility rules; some limited exceptions apply. Players may hold more than one non-FIFA nationality.

No.	Pos.	Nation	Player
—	GK	SWE	Tommy Naurin (from Qviding FIF)
—	FW	SWE	Saihou Jagne (on loan from AIK)
—	DF	SWE	Fredric Jonson (from Vasalunds IF)

Out: Note: Flags indicate national team as defined under FIFA eligibility rules; some limited exceptions apply. Players may hold more than one non-FIFA nationality.

No.	Pos.	Nation	Player
—	GK	SWE	Fredrik Sundfors (retire)
—	DF	SWE	Erkan Saglik (to Kocaelispor)
—	DF	ISL	Sverrir Gardarsson (free transfer)
—	FW	NGA	Akombo Ukeyima (free transfer)
—	DF	SWE	Christian Söderberg (free transfer)
—	MF	SWE	Anton Andersson (to IK Boden)
—	MF	TAN	Kali Ongala (on loan to Umeå FC)
—	GK	SWE	Alexander Hysén (on loan to Östersunds FK)

=== Hammarby IF ===
In: Note: Flags indicate national team as defined under FIFA eligibility rules; some limited exceptions apply. Players may hold more than one non-FIFA nationality.

No.	Pos.	Nation	Player
—	MF	SWE	Sebastian Bojassén (from Hammarby Talang FF)
—	DF	FIN	Robin Wikman (from BK Häcken)
—	DF	SWE	Filip Bergman (free transfer)
—	FW	SWE	Tobias Holmqvist (from Helsingborgs IF)
—	FW	NOR	Petter Furuseth (from FK Lyn)
—	DF	SWE	Isak Dahlin (from Hammarby Talang FF)
—	DF	SWE	Mauro Saez Jarpa (from Hammarby Talang FF)

Out: Note: Flags indicate national team as defined under FIFA eligibility rules; some limited exceptions apply. Players may hold more than one non-FIFA nationality.

No.	Pos.	Nation	Player
—	DF	DEN	Mikkel Jensen (to IF Brommapojkarna)
—	FW	RSA	Nathan Paulse (on loan to Ajax Cape Town)
—	DF	SWE	Emil Johansson (to Molde FK)
—	MF	SWE	Haris Laitinen (free transfer)
—	GK	SWE	Kristoffer Björklund (free transfer)
—	FW	BRA	Rafael Magalhaes (loan return to Santo André)
—	MF	BRA	Luiz Cláudio Carvalho da Silva (loan return to Palmeiras B)
—	DF	MDA	Igor Armaş (to FC Kuban Krasnodar)
—	DF	DEN	Christian Traoré (on loan to Hønefoss BK)

=== IFK Norrköping ===
In: Note: Flags indicate national team as defined under FIFA eligibility rules; some limited exceptions apply. Players may hold more than one non-FIFA nationality.

No.	Pos.	Nation	Player
—	FW	ALB	Shpetim Hasani (from IK Sirius)
—	FW	SWE	Marcus Johansson (from Hagahöjdens BK)
—	MF	SWE	David Wiklander (from Qviding FIF)
—	GK	SWE	Niclas Westberg (from FC Väsby United)
—	MF	SWE	Mikael Lindskog (from IK Sleipner)
—	MF	SWE	Tobias Rickhammar (from IK Sleipner)

Out: Note: Flags indicate national team as defined under FIFA eligibility rules; some limited exceptions apply. Players may hold more than one non-FIFA nationality.

No.	Pos.	Nation	Player
—	DF	SWE	Mikael Roth (free transfer)
—	FW	ISL	Stefan Thordarson (retire)
—	GK	SWE	Nuredin Bakiu (free transfer)
—	MF	SWE	Mikael Blomberg (free transfer)
—	MF	SWE	Magnus Samuelsson (retire)
—	MF	SWE	Patrik Jönsson (retire)

=== IK Brage ===
In: Note: Flags indicate national team as defined under FIFA eligibility rules; some limited exceptions apply. Players may hold more than one non-FIFA nationality.

No.	Pos.	Nation	Player
—	MF	SWE	Daniel Åkervall (from Ljungskile SK)
—	MF	UKR	Vyacheslav Jevtushenko (from Valsta Syrianska IK)
—	GK	SWE	Peter Bergqvist (from Sandvikens IF)
—	DF	SWE	Håkan Malmström (from Ham Kam)
—	MF	SWE	Jesper Medén (from Ludvika FK)
—	MF	SWE	Rasmus Östman (on loan from Trelleborgs FF)

Out: Note: Flags indicate national team as defined under FIFA eligibility rules; some limited exceptions apply. Players may hold more than one non-FIFA nationality.

No.	Pos.	Nation	Player
—	MF	SWE	Jonatan Lundevall (to FC Väsby United)
—	DF	SWE	Gabriel Öberg-Bustad (free transfer)
—	FW	SWE	Mats Theander (free transfer)
—	GK	SWE	Tom Jansson (to Kvarnsvedens IK)
—	GK	SWE	Johan Höjer (free transfer)
—	MF	SWE	Anders Lindholm (to Kvarnsvedens IK)
—	MF	SWE	Stefan Jadnerth (free transfer)
—	DF	SWE	Niklas Bergfors (free transfer)

=== Jönköpings Södra IF ===
In: Note: Flags indicate national team as defined under FIFA eligibility rules; some limited exceptions apply. Players may hold more than one non-FIFA nationality.

No.	Pos.	Nation	Player
—	MF	SWE	Kristoffer Fagercrantz (from Falkenbergs FF)
—	GK	SWE	Nuredin Bakiu (from IFK Norrköping)
—	FW	SWE	Pär Cederqvist (from Landskrona BoIS)
—	FW	SWE	Mathias Etéus (from IFK Göteborg)
—	DF	SWE	Petter Lennartsson (On loan from Kalmar FF)
—	MF	SWE	Robert Walker (from Örebro SK)
—	DF	FIN	Jukka Sauso (from HJK Helsinki)

Out: Note: Flags indicate national team as defined under FIFA eligibility rules; some limited exceptions apply. Players may hold more than one non-FIFA nationality.

No.	Pos.	Nation	Player
—	DF	SVN	Uros Hojan (free transfer)
—	DF	SVN	Peter Klancar (free transfer)
—	FW	EST	Kristen Viikmäe (free transfer)
—	GK	SWE	Mikael Axelsson (to Tenhults IF)
—	GK	SWE	Carl Kjeldsen (to Mariebo IK)
—	DF	SWE	Eddie Avdic (on loan to Tenhults IF)
—	GK	SWE	Niklas Helgesson (on loan to Råslätts SK)
—	GK	SWE	Markus Everstrand (on loan to Hallby IF)

=== Landskrona BoIS ===
In: Note: Flags indicate national team as defined under FIFA eligibility rules; some limited exceptions apply. Players may hold more than one non-FIFA nationality.

No.	Pos.	Nation	Player
—	MF	FIN	Fredrik Svanbäck (from Helsingborgs IF)
—	MF	SWE	Patrik Åström (from Ängelholms FF)
—	FW	SWE	Fredrik Karlsson (from Lunds BK)
—	DF	SWE	Mikael Bengtsson (from Trelleborgs FF)
—	MF	SWE	Mathias Unkuri (from Helsingborgs IF) (Note: "Mathias Unkuri klar" (in Swedish). landskronabois.com. 2010-01-15.)
—	DF	SWE	Tim Andersson (from Östersunds FK) (Note: "Klart med Tim Andersson" (in Swedish). landskronabois.com. 2010-02-10.)
—	FW	RSA	Ralani Bradley (on loan from IFK Hässleholm)
—	FW	SWE	Kristoffer Näfver (from Örebro SK)
—	MF	DEN	Thomas Raun (from Viborg FF) (Note: "Thomas Raun klar" (in Swedish). landskronabois.com. 2010-03-26.)
—	FW	DEN	Morten Nielsen (on loan from AZ Alkmaar)

Out: Note: Flags indicate national team as defined under FIFA eligibility rules; some limited exceptions apply. Players may hold more than one non-FIFA nationality.

No.	Pos.	Nation	Player
—	MF	CMR	Charles Anderson (to Östers IF)
—	MF	SWE	Christoffer Carlsson (free transfer)
—	FW	BRA	Renam França (free transfer)
—	DF	SWE	Martin Olofsson (free transfer)
—	MF	SWE	Mirza Jelecak (free transfer)
—	DF	SWE	Jesper Westerberg (to Mjällby AIF)
—	FW	SWE	Pär Cederqvist (to Jönköpings Södra IF)

=== Ljungskile SK ===
In: Note: Flags indicate national team as defined under FIFA eligibility rules; some limited exceptions apply. Players may hold more than one non-FIFA nationality.

No.	Pos.	Nation	Player
—	GK	USA	Nick Noble (from Austin Aztex FC)
—	DF	SWE	Sören Ferm (from Ytterby IS) (Note: "Sören Ferm klar för Ljungskile" (in Swedish). lsk.se. 2009-12-15.)
—	MF	SWE	Arash Bayat (from Qviding FIF) (Note: "Arash Bayat klar för Ljungskile" (in Swedish). lsk.se. 2009-12-30.)
—	FW	SWE	Andreas Lind (from IF Sylvia)
—	DF	SWE	Andreas Tobiasson (from GAIS) (Note: "Andreas Tobiasson klar för Ljungskile" (in Swedish). lsk.se. 2010-02-02.)
—	DF	BRA	Josemar (free transfer) (Note: "Josemar da Santana Silva klar för LSK" (in Swedish). lsk.se. 2010-02-19.)
—	DF	SWE	David Durmaz (free transfer) (Note: "David Durmaz klar för Ljungskile" (in Swedish). lsk.se. 2010-02-17.)
—	DF	FIN	Henrik Nikkilä (from Särö IK) (Note: "Henrik Nikkilä klar för Ljungskile" (in Swedish). lsk.se. 2010-02-12.)
—	FW	SWE	Gabriel Altemark-Vanneryr (from Jonsereds IF) (Note: "Gabriel Altemark-Vanneryr klar för LSK" (in Swedish). lsk.se. 2010-01-01.)
—	MF	SWE	Johan Friberg da Cruz (from Blokhus FC) (Note: "Johan Friberg da Cruz klar för LSK" (in Swedish). lsk.se. 2010-02-24.)
—	MF	SWE	Martin Dohlsten (from Örgryte IS) (Note: "Martin Dohlsten klar för LSK" (in Swedish). lsk.se. 2010-03-24.)

Out: Note: Flags indicate national team as defined under FIFA eligibility rules; some limited exceptions apply. Players may hold more than one non-FIFA nationality.

No.	Pos.	Nation	Player
—	MF	NIR	Daryl Smylie (loan return to Kalmar FF)
—	FW	SWE	Jörgen Wålemark (retire)
—	DF	SWE	Richard Jansson (to Assyriska FF)
—	GK	USA	Colin Burns (to Sarpsborg 08 FF)
—	MF	SWE	Daniel Åkervall (to IK Brage)
—	MF	SWE	Viktor Adebahr (free transfer)
—	DF	USA	Ryan Miller (to Halmstads BK)
—	DF	USA	Etchu Tabe (to RoPS)

=== Syrianska FC ===
In: Note: Flags indicate national team as defined under FIFA eligibility rules; some limited exceptions apply. Players may hold more than one non-FIFA nationality.

No.	Pos.	Nation	Player
—	MF	EST	Martin Vunk (from FC Flora)
—	MF	NGA	Obi Etie (from FC Flora)
—	DF	EST	Tõnis Vanna (from FC Flora)
—	MF	SWE	Anders Bååth-Sjöblom (from IF Brommapojkarna)
—	FW	NGA	Peter Ijeh (from Viking FK)
—	GK	JAM	Dwayne Miller (from Harbour View F.C.)
—	FW	SWE	Yussuf Saleh (on loan from AIK)

Out: Note: Flags indicate national team as defined under FIFA eligibility rules; some limited exceptions apply. Players may hold more than one non-FIFA nationality.

No.	Pos.	Nation	Player
—	FW	GHA	Michael Mensah (contracted terminated)
—	FW	PLE	Imad Zatara (on loan to Nîmes)

=== Ängelholms FF ===
In: Note: Flags indicate national team as defined under FIFA eligibility rules; some limited exceptions apply. Players may hold more than one non-FIFA nationality.

No.	Pos.	Nation	Player
—	DF	SWE	Mikael Dahlgren (from GAIS)
—	MF	SWE	Tobias Johansson (from Mjällby AIF)
—	GK	SWE	Daniel Andersson (from Helsingborgs IF)
—	FW	ISL	Heidar Geir Juliusson (from Fram)
—	MF	SWE	Robin Nilsson (on loan from Malmö FF)

Out: Note: Flags indicate national team as defined under FIFA eligibility rules; some limited exceptions apply. Players may hold more than one non-FIFA nationality.

No.	Pos.	Nation	Player
—	MF	SWE	Patrik Åström (to Landskrona BoIS)
—	FW	SWE	Mattias Adelstam (to Trelleborgs FF)

=== Örgryte IS ===
In: Note: Flags indicate national team as defined under FIFA eligibility rules; some limited exceptions apply. Players may hold more than one non-FIFA nationality.

No.	Pos.	Nation	Player
—	FW	SWE	Luka Mijaljevic (from FK Velebit)
—	MF	SWE	Sebastian Johansson (from Halmstads BK) (Note: "Luka Sebastian Johansson klar för ÖIS" (in Swedish). ois.se. 2010-01-11.)
—	DF	BRA	Valter Tomaz Junior (from Molde FK)
—	FW	SWE	Ken Fagerberg (on loan from FC Midtjylland)

Out: Note: Flags indicate national team as defined under FIFA eligibility rules; some limited exceptions apply. Players may hold more than one non-FIFA nationality.

No.	Pos.	Nation	Player
—	DF	SWE	Johan Sjöberg (loan return to IF Elfsborg) (Note: "Sjöberg skall hjälpa Örgryte kvar i allsvenskan" (in Swedish). Elfsborg.se. 2009-06-02.)
—	DF	CRC	Roy Miller (loan return to Rosenborg BK)
—	MF	SWE	Magnus Källander (free transfer)
—	GK	SWE	David Stenman (free transfer)
—	MF	SWE	Martin Dohlsten (free transfer)
—	MF	SWE	Christian Lindström (to Qviding FIF)

=== Östers IF ===
In: Note: Flags indicate national team as defined under FIFA eligibility rules; some limited exceptions apply. Players may hold more than one non-FIFA nationality.

No.	Pos.	Nation	Player
—	MF	CMR	Charles Anderson (from Landskrona BoIS)
—	GK	SWE	Björn Åkesson (from IFK Värnamo)
—	MF	ISL	Davíð Viðarsson (from FH)
—	MF	RSA	Jabu Mahlangu (from Platinum Stars)
—	FW	RWA	Olivier Karekezi (free transfer)

Out: Note: Flags indicate national team as defined under FIFA eligibility rules; some limited exceptions apply. Players may hold more than one non-FIFA nationality.

No.	Pos.	Nation	Player
—	GK	SWE	Robin Malmqvist (to Halmstads BK)
—	DF	SWE	Tobias Häll (to IK Sleipner)
—	FW	SWE	Axel Johansson (free transfer)
—	FW	ARG	Tomas Petry (free transfer)
—	FW	SWE	Marcus Nobell (to FC Gute)
—	MF	SWE	Fredrik Petersson (to Lindsdals IF)
