= List of Swedish football transfers summer 2012 =

This is a list of Swedish football transfers in the summer transfer window 2012 by club.

Only transfers in and out between 1–31 August 2012 of the Allsvenskan and Superettan are included.

== Allsvenskan ==
=== AIK ===
In: Note: Flags indicate national team as defined under FIFA eligibility rules; some limited exceptions apply. Players may hold more than one non-FIFA nationality.

No.	Pos.	Nation	Player
—	DF	SWE	Daniel Majstorović (from Celtic)
—	FW	GHA	Kwame Karikari (loan return from Degerfors IF)
—	MF	SWE	Robin Palacios (loan return from Akropolis IF)
—	FW	SWE	Henok Goitom (from Almeria)
—	FW	SLE	Mohamed Bangura (on loan from Celtic)
—	FW	SLE	Tom Bongay (on loan from Old Edwardians)

Out: Note: Flags indicate national team as defined under FIFA eligibility rules; some limited exceptions apply. Players may hold more than one non-FIFA nationality.

No.	Pos.	Nation	Player
—	FW	SWE	Pontus Engblom (to FK Haugesund)
—	DF	SWE	Sal Jobarteh (on loan to IK Sirius)
—	MF	SWE	Nicklas Maripuu (on loan to Umeå FC)
—	MF	SWE	Robin Palacios (on loan to IK Frej)
—	FW	SLE	Alhassan Kamara (on loan to Örebro SK)
—	FW	SWE	Edward Owusu (on loan to Akropolis IF)
—	FW	SWE	Christian Kouakou (on loan to Akropolis IF)

=== BK Häcken ===
In: Note: Flags indicate national team as defined under FIFA eligibility rules; some limited exceptions apply. Players may hold more than one non-FIFA nationality.

No.	Pos.	Nation	Player
—	DF	LBR	Jimmy Dixon (from Manisaspor)

Out: Note: Flags indicate national team as defined under FIFA eligibility rules; some limited exceptions apply. Players may hold more than one non-FIFA nationality.

No.	Pos.	Nation	Player
—	FW	HON	Eddie Hernández (loan return to Platense)
—	DF	SWE	Mattias Östberg (to Djurgårdens IF)

=== Djurgårdens IF ===
In: Note: Flags indicate national team as defined under FIFA eligibility rules; some limited exceptions apply. Players may hold more than one non-FIFA nationality.

No.	Pos.	Nation	Player
—	GK	NOR	Kenneth Høie (free transfer)
—	DF	SLE	Mohamed Kamanor (on loan from FC Kallon)
—	FW	SWE	Erton Fejzullahu (from N.E.C.)
—	DF	SWE	Mattias Östberg (from BK Häcken)

Out: Note: Flags indicate national team as defined under FIFA eligibility rules; some limited exceptions apply. Players may hold more than one non-FIFA nationality.

No.	Pos.	Nation	Player
—	FW	SWE	Carl Björk (on loan to Västerås SK)
—	FW	BRA	Ricardo Santos (to Sogndal)
—	DF	SWE	Kebba Ceesay (to Lech Poznań)
—	FW	SWE	Trimi Makolli (on loan to IK Frej)

=== GAIS ===
In: Note: Flags indicate national team as defined under FIFA eligibility rules; some limited exceptions apply. Players may hold more than one non-FIFA nationality.

No.	Pos.	Nation	Player

Out: Note: Flags indicate national team as defined under FIFA eligibility rules; some limited exceptions apply. Players may hold more than one non-FIFA nationality.

No.	Pos.	Nation	Player
—	MF	BRA	Wánderson (on loan to FC Krasnodar)
—	GK	FIN	Henri Sillanpää (on loan to Tromsø IL)

=== Gefle IF ===
In: Note: Flags indicate national team as defined under FIFA eligibility rules; some limited exceptions apply. Players may hold more than one non-FIFA nationality.

No.	Pos.	Nation	Player

Out: Note: Flags indicate national team as defined under FIFA eligibility rules; some limited exceptions apply. Players may hold more than one non-FIFA nationality.

No.	Pos.	Nation	Player
—	MF	SWE	Hjalmar Öhagen (to Sandvikens IF)
—	FW	SWE	Erik Törnros (on loan to IK Brage)
—	DF	SWE	Sebastian Senatore (free transfer)

=== GIF Sundsvall ===
In: Note: Flags indicate national team as defined under FIFA eligibility rules; some limited exceptions apply. Players may hold more than one non-FIFA nationality.

No.	Pos.	Nation	Player
—	MF	SWE	Robbin Sellin (from IK Brage)

Out: Note: Flags indicate national team as defined under FIFA eligibility rules; some limited exceptions apply. Players may hold more than one non-FIFA nationality.

No.	Pos.	Nation	Player
—	FW	SWE	Mehmed Hafizovic (on loan to Hudiksvalls FF)
—	FW	BRA	Denis Santos (retires)

=== Helsingborgs IF ===
In: Note: Flags indicate national team as defined under FIFA eligibility rules; some limited exceptions apply. Players may hold more than one non-FIFA nationality.

No.	Pos.	Nation	Player
—	FW	SRB	Nikola Đurđić (on loan from FK Haugesund)
—	MF	GHA	David Accam (from Östersunds FK)
—	MF	USA	Alejandro Bedoya (from Rangers F.C.)
—	DF	SWE	Peter Larsson (on loan from F.C. Copenhagen)

Out: Note: Flags indicate national team as defined under FIFA eligibility rules; some limited exceptions apply. Players may hold more than one non-FIFA nationality.

No.	Pos.	Nation	Player
—	FW	SWE	Erik Sundin (to Hammarby IF)
—	MF	SWE	Marcus Bergholtz (to Östers IF)
—	FW	ISL	Alfreð Finnbogason (loan return to K.S.C. Lokeren)
—	FW	SWE	Lucas Ohlander (on loan to Brønshøj BK) (Note: "Lucas Ohlander lånas ut till danska ligan" (in Swedish). hif.se. 4 September 2012.)

=== IF Elfsborg ===
In: Note: Flags indicate national team as defined under FIFA eligibility rules; some limited exceptions apply. Players may hold more than one non-FIFA nationality.

No.	Pos.	Nation	Player
—	FW	SWE	Richard Yarsuvat (loan return from IFK Värnamo)

Out: Note: Flags indicate national team as defined under FIFA eligibility rules; some limited exceptions apply. Players may hold more than one non-FIFA nationality.

No.	Pos.	Nation	Player
—	GK	NOR	Kenneth Høie (free transfer)
—	DF	SWE	Carl Wede (on loan to Falkenbergs FF)
—	FW	SWE	Richard Yarsuvat (on loan to Örgryte IS)

=== IFK Göteborg ===
In: Note: Flags indicate national team as defined under FIFA eligibility rules; some limited exceptions apply. Players may hold more than one non-FIFA nationality.

No.	Pos.	Nation	Player
—	DF	SWE	Mattias Bjärsmyr (free transfer)

Out: Note: Flags indicate national team as defined under FIFA eligibility rules; some limited exceptions apply. Players may hold more than one non-FIFA nationality.

No.	Pos.	Nation	Player
—	MF	SWE	Sebastian Eriksson (to Cagliari)
—	MF	SWE	Tobias Sana (to Ajax)

=== IFK Norrköping ===
In: Note: Flags indicate national team as defined under FIFA eligibility rules; some limited exceptions apply. Players may hold more than one non-FIFA nationality.

No.	Pos.	Nation	Player

Out: Note: Flags indicate national team as defined under FIFA eligibility rules; some limited exceptions apply. Players may hold more than one non-FIFA nationality.

No.	Pos.	Nation	Player
—	MF	SWE	Astrit Ajdarević (to Standard Liège)
—	MF	SWE	Riki Cakić (on loan to IK Sleipner)
—	FW	KOS	Shpëtim Hasani (to Örebro SK)

=== Kalmar FF ===
In: Note: Flags indicate national team as defined under FIFA eligibility rules; some limited exceptions apply. Players may hold more than one non-FIFA nationality.

No.	Pos.	Nation	Player
—	GK	SEN	Khadim N'Diaye (on loan from ASC Linguère)

Out: Note: Flags indicate national team as defined under FIFA eligibility rules; some limited exceptions apply. Players may hold more than one non-FIFA nationality.

No.	Pos.	Nation	Player
—	MF	SWE	Johan Bertilsson (on loan to Jönköpings Södra IF)

=== Malmö FF ===
In: Note: Flags indicate national team as defined under FIFA eligibility rules; some limited exceptions apply. Players may hold more than one non-FIFA nationality.

No.	Pos.	Nation	Player
—	DF	SWE	Matias Concha (from Bochum)
—	FW	RSA	Tokelo Rantie (on loan from Stars Of Africa Academy)
—	GK	SWE	Zlatan Azinović (from Trelleborgs FF) (Note: "Zlatan Azinovic till Malmö FF" (in Swedish). mff.se. 22 August 2012.)
—	MF	SWE	David Löfquist (on loan from Parma)

Out: Note: Flags indicate national team as defined under FIFA eligibility rules; some limited exceptions apply. Players may hold more than one non-FIFA nationality.

No.	Pos.	Nation	Player
—	MF	SWE	Jimmy Durmaz (to Gençlerbirliği)
—	MF	NED	Rick Kruys (to Excelsior)
—	GK	SWE	Viktor Noring (loan return to Trelleborgs FF) (Note: "Zlatan Azinovic till Malmö FF" (in Swedish). mff.se. 22 August 2012.)
—	MF	SWE	Tobias Lewicki (to Trelleborgs FF)
—	FW	SWE	Mathias Ranégie (to Udinese)

=== Mjällby AIF ===
In: Note: Flags indicate national team as defined under FIFA eligibility rules; some limited exceptions apply. Players may hold more than one non-FIFA nationality.

No.	Pos.	Nation	Player
—	FW	NED	Moestafa El Kabir (loan return from Cagliari)
—	DF	CHI	Juan Robledo (from Kasımpaşa S.K.)

Out: Note: Flags indicate national team as defined under FIFA eligibility rules; some limited exceptions apply. Players may hold more than one non-FIFA nationality.

No.	Pos.	Nation	Player
—	MF	SWE	Robin Strömberg (on loan to Þór Akureyri)
—	MF	CZE	Pavel Zavadil (to Zbrojovka Brno)

=== Syrianska FC ===
In: Note: Flags indicate national team as defined under FIFA eligibility rules; some limited exceptions apply. Players may hold more than one non-FIFA nationality.

No.	Pos.	Nation	Player
—	MF	SWE	Charbel Georges (from AS Botkyrka IF)
—	DF	GER	Christian Demirtaş (free transfer)
—	MF	SWE	Labinot Harbuzi (free transfer)
—	MF	SWE	Josef Ibrahim (on loan from Örebro SK)

Out: Note: Flags indicate national team as defined under FIFA eligibility rules; some limited exceptions apply. Players may hold more than one non-FIFA nationality.

No.	Pos.	Nation	Player
—	MF	SWE	Semir Mete (on loan to Husqvarna FF)
—	GK	NOR	Lasse Staw (to Lillestrøm SK)
—	MF	SWE	Rabi George (free transfer)
—	MF	CMR	Matthew Mbuta (free transfer)
—	MF	NGA	Obie Etie (on loan to Syrianska IF)

=== Åtvidabergs FF ===
In: Note: Flags indicate national team as defined under FIFA eligibility rules; some limited exceptions apply. Players may hold more than one non-FIFA nationality.

No.	Pos.	Nation	Player
—	GK	SWE	Thomas Thudin (free transfer)
—	MF	GHA	Mohammed Abubakari (from Doxa Drama)
—	FW	BRA	Diego Pelicles da Silva (from Al-Muharraq SC)
—	MF	DEN	Martin Christensen (from HB Køge)

Out: Note: Flags indicate national team as defined under FIFA eligibility rules; some limited exceptions apply. Players may hold more than one non-FIFA nationality.

No.	Pos.	Nation	Player
—	MF	SWE	Christoffer Karlsson (on loan to Varbergs BoIS)

=== Örebro SK ===
In: Note: Flags indicate national team as defined under FIFA eligibility rules; some limited exceptions apply. Players may hold more than one non-FIFA nationality.

No.	Pos.	Nation	Player
—	FW	SLE	Alhassan Kamara (on loan from AIK)
—	FW	KOS	Shpëtim Hasani (from IFK Norrköping)

Out: Note: Flags indicate national team as defined under FIFA eligibility rules; some limited exceptions apply. Players may hold more than one non-FIFA nationality.

No.	Pos.	Nation	Player
—	FW	SWE	Peter Samuelsson (on loan to Degerfors IF)
—	MF	FIN	Tommy Wirtanen (to IFK Mariehamn)
—	FW	SWE	Simon Leonidsson (on loan to Karlslunds IF)
—	FW	SWE	Miralem Malic (on loan to Karlslunds IF)
—	FW	KOS	Kushtrim Lushtaku (contract terminated)

== Superettan ==
=== Assyriska FF ===
In: Note: Flags indicate national team as defined under FIFA eligibility rules; some limited exceptions apply. Players may hold more than one non-FIFA nationality.

No.	Pos.	Nation	Player
—	DF	ESP	Ubay Luzardo (from Kitchee SC)
—	GK	BLR	Filip Vaytekhovich (from IK Frej)
—	MF	TUR	Ceyhun Eriş (free transfer)

Out: Note: Flags indicate national team as defined under FIFA eligibility rules; some limited exceptions apply. Players may hold more than one non-FIFA nationality.

No.	Pos.	Nation	Player

=== Degefors IF ===
In: Note: Flags indicate national team as defined under FIFA eligibility rules; some limited exceptions apply. Players may hold more than one non-FIFA nationality.

No.	Pos.	Nation	Player
—	FW	SWE	Peter Samuelsson (on loan from Örebro SK)

Out: Note: Flags indicate national team as defined under FIFA eligibility rules; some limited exceptions apply. Players may hold more than one non-FIFA nationality.

No.	Pos.	Nation	Player
—	FW	GHA	Kwame Karikari (loan return to AIK)

=== Falkenbergs FF ===
In: Note: Flags indicate national team as defined under FIFA eligibility rules; some limited exceptions apply. Players may hold more than one non-FIFA nationality.

No.	Pos.	Nation	Player
—	DF	SWE	Carl Wede (on loan from IF Elfsborg)

Out: Note: Flags indicate national team as defined under FIFA eligibility rules; some limited exceptions apply. Players may hold more than one non-FIFA nationality.

No.	Pos.	Nation	Player
—	MF	SLE	Sahr David Morsay (on loan to Konyaspor KIF)
—	DF	SWE	Tobias Johansson (on loan to Konyaspor KIF)

=== Halmstads BK ===
In: Note: Flags indicate national team as defined under FIFA eligibility rules; some limited exceptions apply. Players may hold more than one non-FIFA nationality.

No.	Pos.	Nation	Player
—	MF	SWE	Kristoffer Fagercrantz (on loan from Kalmar FF)

Out: Note: Flags indicate national team as defined under FIFA eligibility rules; some limited exceptions apply. Players may hold more than one non-FIFA nationality.

No.	Pos.	Nation	Player
—	MF	ISL	Jónas Sævarsson (to KR)

=== Hammarby IF ===
In: Note: Flags indicate national team as defined under FIFA eligibility rules; some limited exceptions apply. Players may hold more than one non-FIFA nationality.

No.	Pos.	Nation	Player
—	MF	CAN	Nikolas Ledgerwood (from Wehen Wiesbaden)
—	DF	DEN	Thomas Christensen (from HB Køge)
—	MF	ARG	Luis Rodríguez (from FC Sunkar)
—	FW	SWE	Erik Sundin (from Helsingborgs IF)
—	MF	SWE	Kennedy Bakircioglu (free transfer)

Out: Note: Flags indicate national team as defined under FIFA eligibility rules; some limited exceptions apply. Players may hold more than one non-FIFA nationality.

No.	Pos.	Nation	Player
—	MF	SWE	Robin Tranberg (on loan to Enköpings SK)
—	FW	USA	Billy Schuler (on loan to Nacka FF)
—	MF	SWE	Fredrik Forsberg (on loan to Nacka FF)

=== IF Brommapojkarna ===
In: Note: Flags indicate national team as defined under FIFA eligibility rules; some limited exceptions apply. Players may hold more than one non-FIFA nationality.

No.	Pos.	Nation	Player
—	MF	SWE	Bojan Djordjic (free transfer)

Out: Note: Flags indicate national team as defined under FIFA eligibility rules; some limited exceptions apply. Players may hold more than one non-FIFA nationality.

No.	Pos.	Nation	Player
—	MF	SWE	Filip Tronêt (on loan to Västerås SK)

=== IFK Värnamo ===
In: Note: Flags indicate national team as defined under FIFA eligibility rules; some limited exceptions apply. Players may hold more than one non-FIFA nationality.

No.	Pos.	Nation	Player
—	GK	SWE	Richard Fransson (from Hasslö GoIF)

Out: Note: Flags indicate national team as defined under FIFA eligibility rules; some limited exceptions apply. Players may hold more than one non-FIFA nationality.

No.	Pos.	Nation	Player
—	FW	SWE	Richard Yarsuvat (loan return to IF Elfsborg)

=== IK Brage ===
In: Note: Flags indicate national team as defined under FIFA eligibility rules; some limited exceptions apply. Players may hold more than one non-FIFA nationality.

No.	Pos.	Nation	Player
—	FW	SWE	Erik Törnros (on loan from Gefle IF)
—	MF	SWE	Dana Kuhi (on loan from BK Forward)

Out: Note: Flags indicate national team as defined under FIFA eligibility rules; some limited exceptions apply. Players may hold more than one non-FIFA nationality.

No.	Pos.	Nation	Player
—	DF	SWE	Mikael Eklund (on loan to Knattspyrnudeild UMFG)
—	MF	SWE	Robbin Sellin (to GIF Sundsvall)
—	FW	SWE	Jesper Carlsson (to FC Väsby)

=== Jönköpings Södra IF ===
In: Note: Flags indicate national team as defined under FIFA eligibility rules; some limited exceptions apply. Players may hold more than one non-FIFA nationality.

No.	Pos.	Nation	Player
—	FW	USA	Dustin Corea (on loan from Blokhus)
—	MF	SWE	Johan Bertilsson (on loan from Kalmar FF)
—	DF	GEO	Zourab Tsiskaridze (from Amkar Perm) (Note: "Tsiskaridze klar för J-Södra och Corea är spelklar" (in Swedish). j-sodra.se. 9 August 2012.)

Out: Note: Flags indicate national team as defined under FIFA eligibility rules; some limited exceptions apply. Players may hold more than one non-FIFA nationality.

No.	Pos.	Nation	Player
—	FW	SWE	Branimir Hrgota (to Borussia Mönchengladbach)
—	MF	SLV	Dustin Corea (contract terminated)

=== Landskrona BoIS ===
In: Note: Flags indicate national team as defined under FIFA eligibility rules; some limited exceptions apply. Players may hold more than one non-FIFA nationality.

No.	Pos.	Nation	Player
—	FW	TOG	Abdou-Fatawou Dodja (on loan from AS Douanes)

Out: Note: Flags indicate national team as defined under FIFA eligibility rules; some limited exceptions apply. Players may hold more than one non-FIFA nationality.

No.	Pos.	Nation	Player
—	FW	SWE	Sonny Karlsson (free transfer)
—	MF	DEN	Thomas Raun (free transfer)

=== Ljungskile SK ===
In: Note: Flags indicate national team as defined under FIFA eligibility rules; some limited exceptions apply. Players may hold more than one non-FIFA nationality.

No.	Pos.	Nation	Player
—	FW	SWE	Sonny Karlsson (free transfer)
—	FW	SWE	Robert Bagger (from IFK Uddevallas)
—	DF	SWE	Adam Eriksson (from Kinna IF)
—	FW	SWE	Korab Bakraqi (from Gunnilse IS)
—	DF	SWE	Sandeep Mankoo (from Norrby IF)

Out: Note: Flags indicate national team as defined under FIFA eligibility rules; some limited exceptions apply. Players may hold more than one non-FIFA nationality.

No.	Pos.	Nation	Player
—	FW	USA	Steffen Vroom (retired)

=== Trelleborgs FF ===
In: Note: Flags indicate national team as defined under FIFA eligibility rules; some limited exceptions apply. Players may hold more than one non-FIFA nationality.

No.	Pos.	Nation	Player
—	FW	SWE	Nichlas Schön (loan return from Höörs IS)
—	GK	SWE	Viktor Noring (loan return from Malmö FF) (Note: "Zlatan Azinovic till Malmö FF" (in Swedish). mff.se. 22 August 2012.)
—	MF	SWE	Tobias Lewicki (from Malmö FF)

Out: Note: Flags indicate national team as defined under FIFA eligibility rules; some limited exceptions apply. Players may hold more than one non-FIFA nationality.

No.	Pos.	Nation	Player
—	FW	SWE	Mattias Adelstam (free transfer)
—	GK	SWE	Zlatan Azinović (to Malmö FF) (Note: "Zlatan Azinovic till Malmö FF" (in Swedish). mff.se. 22 August 2012.)

=== Umeå FC ===
In: Note: Flags indicate national team as defined under FIFA eligibility rules; some limited exceptions apply. Players may hold more than one non-FIFA nationality.

No.	Pos.	Nation	Player
—	MF	SWE	Nicklas Maripuu (on loan from AIK)

Out: Note: Flags indicate national team as defined under FIFA eligibility rules; some limited exceptions apply. Players may hold more than one non-FIFA nationality.

No.	Pos.	Nation	Player
—	DF	SWE	Jens Sjöström (on loan to Mariehem SK)
—	DF	SLE	Mohamed Kamanor (to Djurgårdens IF)

=== Varbergs BoIS ===
In: Note: Flags indicate national team as defined under FIFA eligibility rules; some limited exceptions apply. Players may hold more than one non-FIFA nationality.

No.	Pos.	Nation	Player
—	MF	SWE	Christoffer Karlsson (on loan from Åtvidabergs FF)
—	MF	CMR	Alain Junior Ollé Ollé (on loan from Åtvidabergs FF)
—	DF	SWE	Sebastian Senatore (free transfer)

Out: Note: Flags indicate national team as defined under FIFA eligibility rules; some limited exceptions apply. Players may hold more than one non-FIFA nationality.

No.	Pos.	Nation	Player

=== Ängelholms FF ===
In: Note: Flags indicate national team as defined under FIFA eligibility rules; some limited exceptions apply. Players may hold more than one non-FIFA nationality.

No.	Pos.	Nation	Player
—	MF	SWE	Muamet Asanovski (from AB)

Out: Note: Flags indicate national team as defined under FIFA eligibility rules; some limited exceptions apply. Players may hold more than one non-FIFA nationality.

No.	Pos.	Nation	Player
—	FW	USA	Lester Dewee (free transfer)
—	MF	SWE	Joakim Alriksson (on loan to Enköpings SK)
—	MF	SWE	Tobias Johansson (retires)

=== Östers IF ===
In: Note: Flags indicate national team as defined under FIFA eligibility rules; some limited exceptions apply. Players may hold more than one non-FIFA nationality.

No.	Pos.	Nation	Player
—	DF	SWE	Joachim Lantz (on loan from IFK Berga)
—	MF	SWE	Marcus Bergholtz (from Helsingborgs IF)

Out: Note: Flags indicate national team as defined under FIFA eligibility rules; some limited exceptions apply. Players may hold more than one non-FIFA nationality.

No.	Pos.	Nation	Player
—	FW	NGA	Kevin Amuneke (free transfer)
—	MF	ISL	Davíð Viðarsson (to Vejle Kolding)
