= 2013 Division 2 (Swedish football) =

Swedish League Division 2
- Season: 2013
- Champions: Skellefteå FF; Huddinge IF; Motala AIF; IFK Uddevalla; Lärje/Angereds IF; Oskarshamns AIK
- Promoted: 6 teams above
- Relegated: 12 teams

Statistics of Swedish football Division 2 for the 2013 season.

== League standings ==
=== Norrland 2013 ===
Pos	Team	Pld	W	D	L	GF	GA	GD	Pts	Promotion or relegation
1	Skellefteå FF	22	14	5	3	51	19	+32	47	Promotion to Division 1
2	Anundsjö IF	22	13	5	4	51	25	+26	44	
3	Härnösands FF	22	12	3	7	33	25	+8	39	
4	Hudiksvalls FF	22	10	6	6	43	25	+18	36	
5	Bodens BK	22	10	6	6	43	35	+8	36	
6	Piteå IF	22	10	5	7	35	24	+11	35	
7	Strömsbergs IF	22	10	4	8	37	26	+11	34	
8	Mariehems SK	22	8	2	12	38	47	−9	26	
9	Assi IF	22	5	8	9	21	41	−20	23	
10	Morön BK	22	4	5	13	29	57	−28	17	
11	Alviks IK	22	4	4	14	19	48	−29	16	Relegation playoffs to Division 3
12	Robertsfors IK	22	3	5	14	18	46	−28	14	Relegation to Division 3

=== Norra Svealand 2013 ===
Pos	Team	Pld	W	D	L	GF	GA	GD	Pts	Promotion or relegation
1	Huddinge IF	22	12	5	5	46	35	+11	41	Promotion to Division 1
2	Konyaspor KIF	22	12	4	6	45	32	+13	40	
3	Akropolis IF	22	10	7	5	38	26	+12	37	
4	Sollentuna FK	22	10	3	9	41	39	+2	33	
5	Syrianska Kerburan	22	9	6	7	28	29	−1	33	
6	Rotebro	22	8	7	7	27	28	−1	31	
7	Kvarnsvedens IK	22	8	6	8	35	32	+3	30	
8	Gamla Upsala SK	22	8	5	9	36	34	+2	29	
9	Karlbergs BK	22	8	5	9	27	28	−1	29	
10	Skiljebo SK	22	6	5	11	29	29	0	23	
11	Västerås IK	22	6	5	11	30	45	−15	23	Relegation playoffs to Division 3
12	Enköpings SK	22	3	6	13	22	47	−25	15	Relegation to Division 3

=== Södra Svealand 2013 ===
Pos	Team	Pld	W	D	L	GF	GA	GD	Pts	Promotion or relegation
1	Motala AIF	21	18	2	1	60	15	+45	56	Promotion to Division 1
2	Enskede IK	21	16	0	5	46	24	+22	48	
3	Värmdö IF	21	11	1	9	35	29	+6	34	
4	IK Sleipner	21	10	3	8	34	23	+11	33	
5	Arameiska/Syrianska	21	10	3	8	32	30	+2	33	
6	Ekerö IK	21	8	2	11	36	39	−3	26	
7	Vimmerby IF	21	8	2	11	25	37	−12	26	
8	Spårvägens FF	21	6	6	9	29	30	−1	24	
9	Smedby AIS	21	7	2	12	27	39	−12	23	
10	Värmbols FC	21	5	6	10	24	33	−9	21	
11	FC Gute	21	4	7	10	18	37	−19	19	Relegation playoffs to Division 3
12	Assyriska Föreningen i Norrköping	21	5	2	14	26	56	−30	17	Relegation to Division 3

=== Norra Götaland 2013 ===
Pos	Team	Pld	W	D	L	GF	GA	GD	Pts	Promotion or relegation
1	IFK Uddevalla	21	13	2	6	50	27	+23	41	Promotion to Division 1
2	Carlstad United	21	11	5	5	48	25	+23	38	
3	IK Gauthiod	21	10	6	5	47	31	+16	36	
4	Rynninge IK	21	10	3	8	27	24	+3	33	
5	IFK Åmål	21	9	4	8	36	29	+7	31	
6	Jonsereds IF	21	9	3	9	35	44	−9	30	
7	Nordvärmland FF	21	7	7	7	31	26	+5	28	
8	Sävedalens IF	21	8	3	10	33	42	−9	27	
9	Tibro AIK	21	8	3	10	31	40	−9	27	
10	Karlslund	21	6	6	9	32	40	−8	24	
11	Ytterby IS	21	6	5	10	29	47	−18	23	Relegation playoffs to Division 3
12	Götene IF	21	4	3	14	27	51	−24	15	Relegation to Division 3

=== Västra Götaland 2013 ===
Pos	Team	Pld	W	D	L	GF	GA	GD	Pts	Promotion or relegation
1	Lärje/Angereds IF	21	14	6	1	55	17	+38	48	Promotion to Division 1
2	Norrby IF	21	11	4	6	56	23	+33	37	
3	Eskilsminne IF	22	13	2	7	53	35	+18	41	
4	Assyriska BK	21	10	7	4	36	22	+14	37	
5	HIF Akademi	21	8	5	8	36	28	+8	29	
6	Dalstorps IF	21	8	5	8	40	40	0	29	
7	Tvååkers IF	21	8	3	10	39	39	0	27	
8	Råslätts SK	21	8	2	11	27	41	−14	26	
9	Lindome GIF	21	8	2	11	39	55	−16	26	
10	Tenhults IF	21	6	4	11	37	47	−10	22	
11	Högaborgs BK	21	6	2	13	27	41	−14	20	Relegation playoffs to Division 3
12	Fässbergs IF	21	2	0	19	20	77	−57	6	Relegation to Division 3

=== Södra Götaland 2013 ===
Pos	Team	Pld	W	D	L	GF	GA	GD	Pts	Promotion or relegation
1	Oskarshamns AIK	21	10	7	4	37	24	+13	37	Promotion to Division 1
2	Torns IF	21	11	2	8	33	37	−4	35	
3	FC Rosengård	21	8	8	5	34	31	+3	32	
4	Lindsdals IF	21	8	7	6	49	34	+15	31	
5	Hässleholms IF	21	9	4	8	40	41	−1	31	
6	KSF Prespa Birlik	21	9	4	8	32	42	−10	31	
7	BW90	21	9	2	10	51	43	+8	29	
8	Ljungby IF	21	7	8	6	28	28	0	29	
9	GIF Nike	21	7	6	8	30	34	−4	27	
10	Kvarnby IK	21	6	6	9	37	37	0	24	
11	Karlskrona AIF	21	7	3	11	29	30	−1	24	Relegation playoffs to Division 3
12	Sölvesborgs GoIF	21	4	5	12	39	58	−19	17	Relegation to Division 3

== Player of the year awards ==
Ever since 2003 the online bookmaker Unibet have given out awards at the end of the season to the best players in Division 2. The recipients are decided by a jury of sportsjournalists, coaches and football experts. The names highlighted in green won the overall national award.

Norrland
Position	Player	Club
GK	(Sweden) Fredrik Enberg	Skellefteå FF
DF	(Bosnia and Herzegovina) Haris Devic	Bodens BK
MF	(Sweden) Simon Gustafsson	Anundsjö IF
FW	(Sweden) Leo Englund	Skellefteå FF

Norra Svealand
Position	Player	Club
GK	(Sweden) Aly Keita	Syrianska IF Kerburan
DF	(Sweden) Umut Cesmeli	Konyaspor KIF
MF	(Sweden) Joel Johansson Matikka	Huddinge IF
FW	(Sweden) Erido Poli	Huddinge IF

Södra Svealand
Position	Player	Club
GK	(Sweden) Jimmy Karlsson	IK Sleipner
DF	(Sweden) Sebastian Starkenberg	Motala AIF
MF	(Sweden) Haris Laitinen	Enskede IK
FW	(Sweden) Niklas Moberg	Smedby AIS

Norra Götaland
Position	Player	Club
GK-	(Sweden) Mattias Karlsson	Carlstad United
DF	(Sweden) Henrik Andersson	IK Gauthiod
MF	(Sweden) Imer Beqiri	IFK Uddevalla
FW	(Sweden) Valon Gashi	IFK Åmål

Västra Götaland
Position	Player	Club
GK	(Sweden) Etta ljoh	Lärje/Angereds IF
DF	(Sweden) Per Nylander	Assyriska BK
MF	(Nigeria) Prince Efe Ehiorobo	Lärje/Angereds IF
FW	(Sweden) Mathias Strinäs	Norrby IF

Södra Götaland
Position	Player	Club
GK	(Sweden) Oscar Johansson	Oskarshamns AIK
DF	(Sweden) Johan Israelsson	Lindsdals IF
MF	(Sweden) Filip Jägerbrink	Oskarshamns AIK
FW	(Sweden) Joel Wedenell	Hässleholms IF
