= 2008 Division 2 (Swedish football) =

Swedish League Division 2
- Season: 2008
- Champions: Skellefteå FF; Syrianska IF Kerburan; Karlslunds IF; IK Sleipner; IK Oddevold; Kristianstads FF
- Promoted: 6 teams above
- Relegated: 12 teams

The following are the statistics of Swedish football Division 2 for the 2008 season.

== League standings ==
=== Division 2 Norrland ===
Pos	Team	Pld	W	D	L	GF	GA	GD	Pts	Promotion or relegation
1	Skellefteå FF (P)	22	15	3	4	50	21	+29	48	Promotion to Division 1
2	IFK Luleå	22	14	2	6	50	25	+25	44	
3	Piteå IF	22	12	1	9	52	37	+15	37	
4	Anundsjö	22	10	6	6	35	37	−2	36	
5	Robertsfors	22	9	5	8	39	31	+8	32	
6	Friska Viljor	22	9	3	10	55	44	+11	30	
7	Umedalen	22	7	8	7	43	46	−3	29	
8	Mariehem	22	9	1	12	40	40	0	28	
9	Infjärden	22	8	4	10	36	52	−16	28	
10	IFK Holmsund	22	6	8	8	27	41	−14	26	Division 3 Relegation Playoffs
11	IFK Timrå (R)	22	5	9	8	49	62	−13	24	Relegation to Division 3
12	Kiruna (R)	22	2	2	18	21	71	−50	8	Relegation to Division 3

Rules for classification: 1) points; 2) goal difference; 3) number of goals scored.
(P) Promoted; (R) Relegated

=== Division 2 Norra Svealand ===
Pos	Team	Pld	W	D	L	GF	GA	GD	Pts	Promotion or relegation
1	Syrianska IF Kerburan (P)	22	13	5	4	46	26	+20	44	Promotion to Division 1
2	Skiljebo SK	22	11	9	2	43	18	+25	42	
3	Sollentuna United	22	11	3	8	36	32	+4	36	
4	Vallentuna	22	8	9	5	39	36	+3	33	
5	Sandvikens IF	22	9	5	8	35	32	+3	32	
6	Söderhamn	22	8	6	8	29	32	−3	30	
7	IK Frej	22	7	8	7	41	37	+4	29	
8	Västerås IK	22	7	4	11	27	44	−17	25	
9	Råsunda	22	6	5	11	30	44	−14	23	
10	Heby AIF	22	4	10	8	27	36	−9	22	Division 3 Relegation Playoffs
11	Brynäs (R)	22	4	9	9	27	34	−7	21	Relegation to Division 3
12	Hudiksvall (R)	22	5	5	12	27	36	−9	20	Relegation to Division 3

Rules for classification: 1) points; 2) goal difference; 3) number of goals scored.
(P) Promoted; (R) Relegated

=== Division 2 Östra Svealand ===
Pos	Team	Pld	W	D	L	GF	GA	GD	Pts	Promotion or relegation
1	Karlslunds IF (P)	22	12	6	4	45	24	+21	42	Promotion to Division 1
2	Eskilstuna City	22	12	6	4	46	28	+18	42	
3	Hammarby Talang	22	10	8	4	48	25	+23	38	
4	Enskede	22	11	4	7	41	34	+7	37	
5	Akropolis IF	22	9	4	9	53	44	+9	31	
6	Värmbol	22	8	5	9	38	35	+3	29	
7	KB Karlskoga	22	9	2	11	32	38	−6	29	
8	FC Gute	22	8	4	10	35	38	−3	28	
9	Älvsjö	22	6	6	10	33	41	−8	24	
10	Panellinios	22	7	3	12	30	52	−22	24	Division 3 Relegation Playoffs
11	Rynninge (R)	22	6	5	11	27	44	−17	23	Relegation to Division 3
12	IFK Eskilstuna (R)	22	4	7	11	30	55	−25	19	Relegation to Division 3

Rules for classification: 1) points; 2) goal difference; 3) number of goals scored.
(P) Promoted; (R) Relegated

=== Division 2 Östra Götaland ===
Pos	Team	Pld	W	D	L	GF	GA	GD	Pts	Promotion or relegation
1	IK Sleipner (P)	22	15	5	2	59	25	+34	50	Promotion to Division 1
2	Myresjö IF	22	13	6	3	51	30	+21	45	
3	Linköping	22	11	8	3	48	37	+11	41	
4	Smedby	22	10	8	4	42	35	+7	38	
5	Kenty	22	9	5	8	38	34	+4	32	
6	Nyköpings BIS	22	8	7	7	36	34	+2	31	
7	Lindsdal	22	7	6	9	30	34	−4	27	
8	Tenhult	22	8	2	12	27	47	−20	26	
9	Nybro IF	22	5	10	7	27	31	−4	25	
10	Ljungby	22	4	6	12	29	42	−13	18	Division 3 Relegation Playoffs
11	Lindö (R)	22	3	6	13	19	45	−26	15	Relegation to Division 3
12	Tord (R)	22	3	3	16	26	48	−22	12	Relegation to Division 3

Rules for classification: 1) points; 2) goal difference; 3) number of goals scored.
(P) Promoted; (R) Relegated

=== Division 2 Västra Götaland ===
Pos	Team	Pld	W	D	L	GF	GA	GD	Pts	Promotion or relegation
1	IK Oddevold (P)	22	14	7	1	40	15	+25	49	Promotion to Division 1
2	Gunnilse	22	15	3	4	43	15	+28	48	
3	Mellerud	22	12	3	7	44	41	+3	39	
4	Varbergs BoIS	22	12	1	9	47	31	+16	37	
5	Utsiktens BK	22	9	6	7	45	31	+14	33	
6	Ahlafors	22	10	3	9	33	31	+2	33	
7	Kinna	22	9	4	9	29	33	−4	31	
8	Jonsered	22	7	7	8	40	33	+7	28	
9	Fässberg	22	8	1	13	30	45	−15	25	
10	Annelund	22	7	1	14	28	52	−24	22	Division 3 Relegation Playoffs
11	Laholm (R)	22	5	3	14	23	41	−18	18	Relegation to Division 3
12	Lärje-Angered (R)	22	3	3	16	22	56	−34	12	Relegation to Division 3

Rules for classification: 1) points; 2) goal difference; 3) number of goals scored.
(P) Promoted; (R) Relegated

=== Division 2 Södra Götaland ===
Pos	Team	Pld	W	D	L	GF	GA	GD	Pts	Promotion or relegation
1	Kristianstads FF (P)	22	15	4	3	47	23	+24	49	Promotion to Division 1
2	Ramlösa Södra	22	12	6	4	63	36	+27	42	
3	Lunds BK	22	13	2	7	42	23	+19	41	
4	Karlskrona	22	12	2	8	40	28	+12	38	
5	IFK Hässleholm	22	9	3	10	40	34	+6	30	
6	GIF Nike	22	8	6	8	25	33	−8	30	
7	Höllvikens GIF	22	7	5	10	30	34	−4	26	
8	IFK Klagshamn	22	7	5	10	34	42	−8	26	
9	Amundtorp	22	7	4	11	35	52	−17	25	
10	Högaborg	22	6	6	10	27	41	−14	24	Division 3 Relegation Playoffs
11	Markaryd (R)	22	6	3	13	36	56	−20	21	Relegation to Division 3
12	Sölvesborg (R)	22	6	2	14	28	55	−27	20	Relegation to Division 3

Rules for classification: 1) points; 2) goal difference; 3) number of goals scored.
(P) Promoted; (R) Relegated

== Player of the year awards ==
Ever since 2003 the online bookmaker Unibet have given out awards at the end of the season to the best players in Division 2. The recipients are decided by a jury of sportsjournalists, coaches and football experts. The names highlighted in green won the overall national award.

Norrland
Position	Player	Club
GK	(Sweden) Fredrik Enberg	Piteå IF
DF	(Sweden) Joel Burström	Robertsfors IK
MF	(Ghana) Maikano Osman	IFK Luleå
FW	(Sweden) Robin Arestad	Mariehem SK

Norra Svealand
Position	Player	Club
GK	(Sweden) Martin Sundström	Brynäs IF
DF	(Sweden) Haisem Ismael	Skiljebo SK
MF	(Sweden) Daniel Jansson	Vallentuna BK
FW	(Sweden) Mattias Mete	Syrianska IF Kerburan

Södra Svealand
Position	Player	Club
GK	(Sweden) Gustav Jansson	Värmbols FC
DF	(Sweden) Marcus Törnstrand	Hammarby TFF
MF	(Sweden) Carlos Gaete Moggia	Hammarby TFF
FW	(Sweden) Michael Allyn	Akropolis IF

Östra Götaland
Position	Player	Club
GK	(Sweden) Magnus Helin	Linköpings FF
DF	(Sweden) Tobias Häll	IK Sleipner
MF	(Sweden) Mikael Andersson	IK Sleipner
FW	(Sweden) Josef Haddad	Linköpings FF

Västra Götaland
Position	Player	Club
GK	(Sweden) Andreas Johansson	Melleruds IF
DF	(Sweden) Jonas Larsson	IK Oddevold
MF	(Sweden) Marco Kotilainen	Gunnilse IS
FW	(Sweden) Markus Svensson	Melleruds IF

Södra Götaland
Position	Player	Club
GK	(Sweden) Christian Fegler	Kristianstads FF
DF	(Sweden) Viktor Agardius	Kristianstads FF
MF	(Sweden) Labinot Kelmendi	Karlskrona AIF
FW	(Sweden) Robin Staaf	Ramlösa Södra FF
