= Wikman =

Wikman is a Swedish surname. Notable people with the surname include:

- Annie Wikman (born 2001), Australian-Italian cricketer
- Adam Wikman (born 2003), Swedish footballer
- Harry Wikman (1929–2017), Finnish rower
- Jonas Wikman (born 1972), Swedish Air Force officer
- Kaarlo Wikman (1877–1925), Finnish educator and politician
- Robin Wikman (born 1986), Finnish-Swedish former footballer

== See also ==
- Vikman
