= Tobiasson =

Tobiasson is a patronymic Swedish surname. Notable people with the surname include:

- Andreas Tobiasson (born 1983), Swedish footballer
- Ingrid Tobiasson (born 1951), Swedish opera singer

== See also ==
- Alex Tobiasson Harris
