= Marcus Johansson =

Marcus Johansson may refer to:

- Marcus Johansson (footballer, born 1994), Swedish footballer who plays for IFK Norrköping
- Marcus Johansson (footballer, born 1993), Swedish footballer who plays for Halmstads BK
- Marcus Johansson (ice hockey, born 1979), Swedish professional ice hockey defenceman
- Marcus Johansson (ice hockey, born 1990), Swedish ice hockey player currently playing for Färjestad BK.
