= Marcus Mårtensson =

Swedish footballer

Personal information
- Full name: Marcus Mårtensson
- Date of birth: 23 April 1990 (age 36)
- Place of birth: Sweden
- Height: 1.83 m (6 ft 0 in)
- Position: Midfielder

Team information
- Current team: Stafsinge IF (on loan from Falkenbergs FF)
- Number: 14

Youth career
- IFK Berga

Senior career*
Years	Team	Apps	(Gls)
2008–2009	Kalmar FF	1	(0)
2009	→ Lindsdals IF (loan)	13	(1)
2010	IFK Berga	22	(36)
2011–	Falkenbergs FF	0	(0)
2012–	→ Stafsinge IF (loan)	2	(3)
- * Club domestic league appearances and goals as of 12 July 2012

Marcus Mårtensson (born 23 April 1990) is a Swedish footballer who plays for Stafsinge IF on loan from Falkenbergs FF as a midfielder.
