= Vikman =

Vikman is a surname. Notable people with the surname include:

- Anna Vikman (born 1981), Swedish ice hockey player
- Erika Vikman (born 1993), Finnish singer and songwriter
- Sofia Vikman (born 1983), Finnish politician

== See also ==
- Wikman
