= Daniel Johansson (footballer) =

Swedish footballer (born 1987)

Personal information
- Full name: Daniel Johansson
- Date of birth: July 28, 1987 (age 39)
- Place of birth: Sweden
- Height: 1.87 m (6 ft 2 in)
- Position: Centre back

Team information
- Current team: Stafsinge IF

Youth career
- 2004: Stafsinge IF
- 2005–2007: Halmstads BK

Senior career*
| Years | Team | Apps | (Gls) |
| 2008 | Halmstads BK | 2 | (0) |
| 2009–2017 | Falkenbergs FF | 201 | (3) |
| 2018– | Stafsinge IF | ? | (?) |
- * Club domestic league appearances and goals as of 19 November 2017

Daniel Johansson (born July 28, 1987) is a Swedish football player, who currently plays as defender for Stafsinge IF.

Starting his football career in Falkenberg and the club Stafsinge IF, at the age of 17 he moved south to Halmstads BK's youth team, he has played his way through the club's youth system and in 2008 he took the final step to the senior team.

On 17 December 2008 it was reported that Halmstads BK would not offer him a new contract and that he had signed for Falkenbergs FF.
