= Mikael Dahlgren =

Swedish footballer

Personal information
- Full name: Jens Mikael Dahlgren
- Date of birth: July 19, 1984 (age 42)
- Place of birth: Landskrona, Sweden
- Height: 1.85 m (6 ft 1 in)
- Position: Defender

Youth career
- –1994: Häljarps IF
- 1995–2002: Landskrona BoIS

Senior career*
Years	Team	Apps	(Gls)
2003–2008	Landskrona BoIS	80	(10)
2005	→ IFK Hässleholm (loan)	?	(?)
2009	GAIS	11	(0)
2010–2014	Ängelholms FF	135	(6)
2015–2016	Landskrona BoIS	52	(6)
2017–2018	Hittarps IK	52	(4)
- * Club domestic league appearances and goals as of 28 February 2017

Mikael Dahlgren (born July 19, 1984) is a retired Swedish footballer who has played for Landskrona BoIS, IFK Hässleholm, GAIS and Ängelholms FF. He last played for Hittarps IK.

== Biography ==
Born into a family of footballers, Dahlgren began his career in local club Häljarps IF, before switching to Landskrona BoIS.
His father, grandfather and uncle, as well as himself, all played in Allsvenskan for Landskrona BoIS.
