= Gustav Jansson =

Swedish footballer

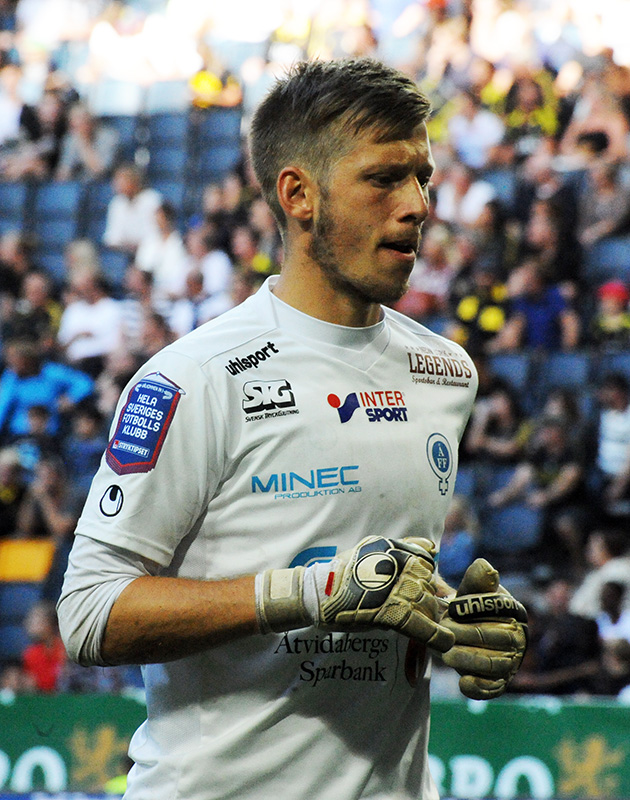
- Jansson in 2009

Personal information
- Date of birth: 24 February 1986 (age 40)
- Place of birth: Sweden
- Height: 1.95 m (6 ft 5 in)
- Position: Goalkeeper

Team information
- Current team: Värmbols FC
- Number: 1

Youth career
- Katrineholms AIK

Senior career*
Years	Team	Apps	(Gls)
2005–2009	Värmbols FC	43	(0)
2010–2017	Åtvidabergs FF	85	(0)
2018–2019	IFK Norrköping	0	(0)
2020–	Värmbols FC	0	(0)
- * Club domestic league appearances and goals as of 21 August 2019

Gustav Jansson (born 24 February 1986) is a Swedish footballer who plays for Värmbols FC as a goalkeeper.

== Club career ==
On 15 April 2020, Jansson returned to Värmbols FC.
