= Kristoffer Björklund =

Swedish footballer (born 1978)

Personal information
- Date of birth: 19 April 1978 (age 48)
- Place of birth: Stockholm, Sweden
- Height: 1.90 m (6 ft 3 in)
- Position: Goalkeeper

Senior career*
Years	Team	Apps	(Gls)
1997–1999	Brommapojkarna	?	(?)
2000–2002	Café Opera Djursholm	47	(0)
2003–2007	Brommapojkarna	137	(0)
2008–2009	Hammarby IF	40	(0)
2010	Assyriska Föreningen	0	(0)
2010	Väsby United	10	(0)
- * Club domestic league appearances and goals

Kristoffer Björklund (born 19 April 1978) is a Swedish former football player.

== Career ==
After a weak start by Hammarbys first choice Rami Shaaban, Björklund jumped in and played surprisingly well. Later, when Rami Shaaban injured his knee, Björklund became the first choice for the rest of the 2008 season. After Shaaban's continued injurie problems, he rotated with Shaaban as first choice for Hammarby in 2009 season. Later on, Hammarby got relegated and "Poppen" left the club due to their economical problems.
