= Mohamed Kamanor =

Sierra Leonean footballer

Personal information
- Full name: Mohamed Kamanor
- Date of birth: 15 October 1992 (age 34)
- Place of birth: Freetown, Sierra Leone
- Height: 1.77 m (5 ft 10 in)
- Position: Defender

Team information
- Current team: FC Kallon

Senior career*
Years	Team	Apps	(Gls)
2008–	FC Kallon		
2012	→ Umeå FC (loan)	13	(0)
2012	→ Djurgårdens IF (loan)	0	(0)
- * Club domestic league appearances and goals

Mohamed Kamanor (born 15 October 1992 in Freetown, Sierra Leone) is a Sierra Leonean footballer who plays for FC Kallon as a defender.

== Career ==
=== FC Kallon ===
Mohamaed Kamanor was recruited to top Sierra Leone National Premier League club FC Kallon by popular Sierra Leonean football agent Chernor Musa Jalloh, who is well known for recruiting many talented young Sierra Leonean footballers. While at FC Kallon, Kamanor quickly established himself as one of the most talented players in the Sierra Leone Premier League.

=== Umeå FC ===
Kamanor signed for Superettan club Umeå FC in 2012. He was recruited by Umeå FC during the club agent visit to Sierra Leone in early 2012. Kamanor was again loaned to Umeå FC in the following season 2013.
