= Prince Efe Ehiorobo =

Nigerian football player

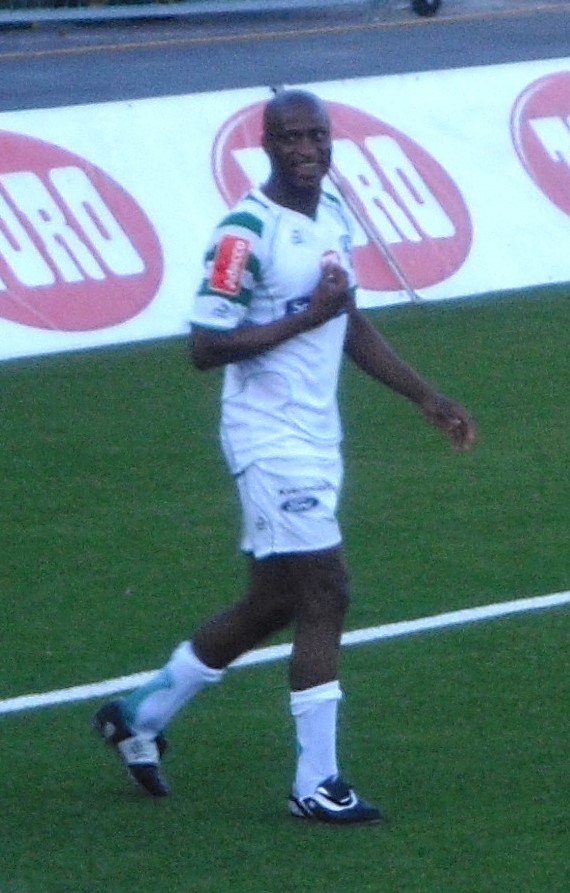

Personal information
- Full name: Prince Efe Ehiorobo
- Date of birth: 12 April 1984 (age 42)
- Place of birth: Benin City, Nigeria
- Height: 1.84 m (6 ft 0 in)
- Position: Attacking midfielder

Team information
- Current team: Bryne
- Number: 2

Youth career
- 1998: Invisible-Leopards FC
- 1999: DSC Aladja

Senior career*
Years	Team	Apps	(Gls)
2000–2002	National Ports Authority	23	(14)
2003–2006	GAIS	52	(8)
2007	Torslanda	2	(0)
2008	Drøbak/Frogn	1	(0)
2008–2009	Løv-Ham	50	(7)
2009	Åtvidaberg	0	(0)
2010–2011	Løv-Ham	37	(5)
2011	Bryne	10	(2)
2012–	Lärje-Angered		

International career
2001	Nigeria	1	(0)
- * Club domestic league appearances and goals

Prince Efe Ehiorobo (born 12 April 1983 in Benin City) is a Nigerian football player who is currently playing for Lärje-Angereds IF.

== Career ==
Ehiorobo started his career in Invisible-Leopards FC Warri before joining DSC Aladja. He then joined NPA of Warri where he had much success and was selected Pepsi Player of the Month. He finished second in the Nigerian Premiership top scorer table. He then came to Sweden in 2001 and signed for GAIS 2002. In GAIS he was selected best player of the season 2004. In 2007, he played a few matches with Swedish lower league team Torslanda IK, he then signed for Norwegian team Drøbak/Frogn IL.

Later he signed for Løv-Ham Fotball in Adeccoligaen. He played for the team in 3 season and later signed for Swedish team Åtvidabergs FF in November 2009 and turned on 12 March 2010 back to his club Løv-Ham Fotball. In 2011, he played for Bryne FK, but moved to Lärje-Angereds IF ahead of the 2012 season. He went ahead and won the league with Lärje-Angered. In August 2012 he participated in Futsal Champions League with FC Ibra.

== International career ==
Ehiorobo was in 2001 invited to the Nigeria national football team and earned his only call up for the Africa Cup of Nations qualification games against Madagascar national football team.
