= Haris Laitinen =

Swedish footballer

Personal information
- Full name: Haris Antti Laitinen Donoukarás
- Date of birth: 5 December 1984 (age 41)
- Place of birth: Skarpnäck, Sweden
- Height: 1.72 m (5 ft 8 in)
- Position: Midfielder

Senior career*
Years	Team	Apps	(Gls)
2003	Hammarby TFF	22	(11)
2004–2009	Hammarby IF	88	(3)
2006	→ IFK Norrköping (loan)	25	(6)
2010–2012	Assyriska FF	53	(9)
2013	AFC United	6	(0)
2013–2014	Enskede IK	34	(13)
2015	IFK Haninge	4	(1)
2015	Nacka FF	9	(0)
Total		241	(43)

International career
2004	Sweden U21	4	(0)
- * Club domestic league appearances and goals

Haris Antti Laitinen Donoukarás (born 5 December 1984) is a Swedish former footballer who played as a midfielder.

== Early life ==
Laitinen was born in Skarpnäck, Sweden, to a Finnish mother and Greek father.

== Career ==
He signed for Assyriska Föreningen after leaving Hammarby IF in December 2009. He went to Hammarby from Hammarby Talang FF for the 2004 season. After the 2006 season with IFK Norrköping on loan, he returned to Hammarby.
