= Daniel Nicklasson =

Swedish footballer

Personal information
- Full name: Anders Daniel Nicklasson
- Date of birth: 23 April 1981 (age 45)
- Place of birth: Sweden
- Height: 1.75 m (5 ft 9 in)
- Position: Midfielder

Youth career
- IFK Hässleholm

Senior career*
Years	Team	Apps	(Gls)
1998	IFK Hässleholm	13	(1)
1999–2000	IFK Göteborg	5	(0)
2000–2001	Aalborg BK	0	(0)
2002	IFK Hässleholm	15	(6)
2003–2004	Mjällby AIF	33	(6)
2005–2009	GAIS	97	(8)
2009–	Mjällby AIF	77	(6)
2014	→ Kristianstads FF (loan)	11	(0)
2015	Kristianstads FF	20	(0)
- * Club domestic league appearances and goals as of 1 January 2016

Daniel Nicklasson (born 23 April 1981) is a Swedish retired footballer who played as a midfielder.
