= Charbel Georges =

Swedish footballer (born 1993)

Personal information
- Date of birth: 28 September 1993 (age 33)
- Place of birth: Kiruna, Sweden
- Height: 1.77 m (5 ft 10 in)
- Position: Midfielder

Team information
- Current team: Enskede IK

Youth career
- IFK Tumba
- Hammarby IF

Senior career*
Years	Team	Apps	(Gls)
2011–2012	Arameisk-Syrianska IF	33	(12)
2012–2017	Syrianska FC	106	(16)
2018	IK Sirius	11	(1)
2019	Mjällby AIF	8	(1)
2020	Arameisk-Syrianska IF	0	(0)
2020–2021	Vasalunds IF	49	(10)
2022	Hammarby TFF	8	(0)
2023–	Enskede IK	13	(3)
- * Club domestic league appearances and goals as of 3 January 2025 (UTC)

Charbel Georges (born 28 September 1993) is a Swedish professional footballer who plays as a midfielder for Swedish club Enskede IK.

Georges is of Assyrian descent; he is the maternal nephew of Sharbel Touma and cousin of Jimmy Durmaz.
