= Mikael Bengtsson =

Swedish former association footballer

Personal information
- Full name: Mikael Bengtsson
- Date of birth: December 5, 1981 (age 44)
- Place of birth: Sweden
- Height: 1.85 m (6 ft 1 in)
- Position: Defender

Youth career
- Malmö FF

Senior career*
Years	Team	Apps	(Gls)
–2004	BK Näset	?	(?)
2005–2009	Trelleborgs FF	102	(2)
2010–2011	Landskrona BoIS	45	(0)
- * Club domestic league appearances and goals as of December 21, 2009

Mikael Bengtsson (born December 5, 1981) is a Swedish former association footballer. He played most of his career for the Swedish club Trelleborgs FF. He has also played for Landskrona BoIS for two seasons.
