= Erik Törnros =

Swedish footballer

Personal information
- Full name: Erik Törnros
- Date of birth: 11 June 1993 (age 33)
- Place of birth: Gävle, Sweden
- Height: 1.94 m (6 ft 4 1/2 in)
- Position: Forward

Youth career
- –2009: Gefle

Senior career*
Years	Team	Apps	(Gls)
2010–2013	Gefle	16	(0)
2012	→ Brage (loan)	7	(2)
2014	Brage	16	(2)
2015–2016	Dalkurd	30	(10)
2016	→ PS Kemi (loan)	13	(8)
2017	GKS Tychy	7	(0)
2017–2018	HB Køge	15	(4)
2018	Gefle	22	(1)
2019–2020	Lahti	16	(2)
2020–2021	Nardò	25	(8)
2021	Acireale	1	(0)
2021	Real Vis Artena	2	(0)
Total		170	(37)

International career
2010	Sweden U17	6	(2)
2012	Sweden U19	2	(0)
- * Club domestic league appearances and goals

Erik Törnros (born 11 June 1993) is a Swedish former professional footballer who played as a forward.

== Career ==
He previously played at HB Køge and Dalkurd.

On 4 August 2016, Törnros signed for PS Kemi on loan for the remainder of the season.

Törnros signed for FC Lahti in Finland on 21 December 2018. He signed a 2-year contract.

Tornros joined AC Nardò in the Italian Serie D in November 2020. He signed a one-year contract.

== Honours ==
Individual

- Veikkausliiga Player of the Month: August 2016
