= Robert Walker (Swedish footballer) =

Swedish footballer

Personal information
- Date of birth: 6 March 1987 (age 39)
- Place of birth: Örebro, Sweden
- Height: 1.83 m (6 ft 0 in)
- Position: Midfielder

Youth career
- 1994: Varbergs BoIS
- 1994–1998: Kalmar FF
- 1998–2000: ÖSK Ungdom
- 2001–2004: GIF Sundsvall
- 2005: Örebro SK

Senior career*
Years	Team	Apps	(Gls)
2006–2009	Örebro SK	38	(5)
2009	→ Åtvidaberg (loan)	11	(3)
2010–2011	Jönköpings Södra IF	41	(3)
2012–2014	BK Forward	58	(15)
- * Club domestic league appearances and goals

Robert Walker (born 6 March 1987 in Örebro) is a Swedish retired football player. Son of manager Pat Walker, Robert has played for Swedish underage teams, but is also eligible to represent the Republic of Ireland. Walker was the second most effective goalscorer (goals/min) in the Swedish Allsvenskan 2007.

In March 2009 Walker was loaned to Åtvidabergs FF until 30 June 2009. He was given the number 6 shirt. During his loan spell at Åtvidaberg, he played 11 times and scored two goals. In February 2010 Walker joined Superettan side Jönköpings Södra IF having seen out his Örebro contract, which expired in January. While at Jönköpings Södra, Walker helped them avoid relegation in 2010 by scoring in a relegation play-off against IK Sirius. During the 2011 season Walker scored three goals as J-Södra again avoided relegation. He left the club at the end of 2011.

In 2012 Walker joined Örebro-based side BK Forward on a free transfer.
