= Kaarlo Wikman =

Finnish educator and politician (1877–1925)

Karl Oskar (Kaarlo Oskari, K. O.) Wikman (12 June 1877 – 5 March 1925) was a Finnish educator and politician, born in Kymi. He was a member of the Parliament of Finland from 1907 to 1909, representing the Young Finnish Party.
