= Calle Wede =

Swedish footballer

Personal information
- Full name: Carl Erik Magnus Wede
- Date of birth: 20 April 1990 (age 36)
- Place of birth: Sweden
- Height: 1.73 m (5 ft 8 in)
- Position: Right midfielder

Youth career
- Västanfors IF
- Fagersta Södra IK
- IF Elfsborg

Senior career*
Years	Team	Apps	(Gls)
2011–2012	IF Elfsborg	2	(0)
2012	→ Falkenbergs FF (loan)	1	(0)
2013–2015	Falkenbergs FF	82	(7)
2016–2017	Helsingborgs IF	10	(0)
2017–2018	GAIS	26	(2)
2019–2021	Örgryte IS	34	(0)

International career
2005	Sweden U17	2	(0)
- * Club domestic league appearances and goals as of 3 August 2020

Carl Erik Magnus "Calle" Wede (born 20 April 1990) is a Swedish footballer who plays as a right midfielder. He is the twin brother of fellow professional footballer Anton Wede.
