= Marcus Falk-Olander =

Swedish footballer

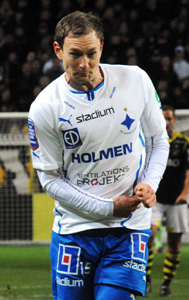

Personal information
- Full name: Marcus Roland Falk-Olander
- Date of birth: 21 May 1987 (age 39)
- Place of birth: Ödeshög Sweden
- Height: 1.80 m (5 ft 11 in)
- Position: Defender

Youth career
- Ödeshögs IK

Senior career*
Years	Team	Apps	(Gls)
2005–2010	IF Elfsborg	2	(0)
2009	→ Trelleborgs FF (loan)	3	(0)
2010	→ Norrby IF (loan)	12	(3)
2010–2017	IFK Norrköping	107	(4)

International career
2004	Sweden U17	7	(0)
2006	Sweden U19	8	(0)
2007	Sweden U21	1	(0)
- * Club domestic league appearances and goals as of 8 April 2018

Marcus Falk-Olander (born 21 May 1987) is a Swedish former footballer.
