= Marcus Johansson (footballer, born 1994) =

Swedish footballer

Personal information
- Date of birth: 1 February 1994 (age 32)
- Place of birth: Sweden
- Height: 1.78 m (5 ft 10 in)
- Position: Forward

Team information
- Current team: Assyriska IF

Youth career
- Hagahöjdens BK

Senior career*
Years	Team	Apps	(Gls)
2009	Hagahöjdens BK		
2010–2013	IFK Norrköping	10	(0)
2011	→ Sylvia (loan)	1	(0)
2012	→ Assyriska BK (loan)	8	(1)
2013	→ Sylvia (loan)	16	(1)
2014–2015	Sylvia	9	(1)
2016–	Assyriska IF		

International career
2009–2011	Sweden U17	8	(2)
- * Club domestic league appearances and goals as of 24 August 2017

Marcus Johansson (born 1 February 1994) is a Swedish footballer who plays for Assyriska IF as a forward.
