= Peter Klančar =

Slovenian footballer

Personal information
- Full name: Peter Klančar
- Date of birth: 14 November 1985 (age 40)
- Height: 1.76 m (5 ft 9 1/2 in)
- Positions: Defender; midfielder

Team information
- Current team: FC-WR Nußdorf/Debant
- Number: 20

Senior career*
Years	Team	Apps	(Gls)
2000–2005	Factor	46	
2005–2006	Rudar Velenje	16	
2006–2007	Ihan	2	(0)
2007–2008	Krka	12	(0)
2008–2009	Jönköpings Södra IF	47	
2010	Interblock	8	(0)
2010–2011	Ivančna Gorica	23	
2011	UMF Selfoss	8	(0)
2012-2013	Rudar Trbovlje	33	(1)
2014	DSG Sele/Zell	11	(0)
2014-	FC-WR Nußdorf/Debant	206	(6)
- * Club domestic league appearances and goals as of 11 November 2023

Peter Klančar (born 14 November 1985) is a Slovenian footballer, who plays for Austrian 5th-tier outfit FC-WR Nußdorf/Debant.
