= Martin Dohlsten =

Swedish footballer

Martin Dohlsten (born 29 April 1986) is a Swedish footballer, currently playing for UMF Selfoss. He moved to the club in the July transfer window 2010 from Örgryte IS.
