= Stafsinge IF =

Swedish football club

- Full name: Stafsinge Idrottsförening
- Nickname: SIF
- Founded: 1943
- Ground: Stafsinge IP; Falkenberg; Sweden
- Chairman: Bengt-Erik Karlsson
- Head coach: Magnus Eriksson
- League: Division 3 Sydvästra Götaland
- 2019: Division 2 Västra Götaland, 14th
Home colours	Away colours

Stafsinge IF is a Swedish football club located in Falkenberg in Halland County.

== Background ==
Stafsinge Idrottsförening were formed on 25 August 1943 at a meeting at the local community hall. The current coach of IF Elfsborg, Magnus Haglund, was the coach of SIF in the years 1998–99.

Since their foundation Stafsinge IF has participated mainly in the middle and lower divisions of the Swedish football league system. The club currently plays in Division 3 Sydvästra Götaland which is the fifth tier of Swedish football. They play their home matches at the Stafsinge IP in Falkenberg.

Stafsinge IF are affiliated to Hallands Fotbollförbund.

== Recent history ==
In recent seasons Stafsinge IF have competed in the following divisions:

2012 – Division III, Sydvästra Götaland
2011 – Division III, Sydvästra Götaland
2010 – Division IV, Halland Elit
2009 – Division IV, Halland Elit
2008 – Division IV, Halland Elit
2007 – Division IV, Halland
2006 – Division IV, Halland
2005 – Division V, Halland Södra
2004 – Division V, Halland Södra
2003 – Division V, Halland Södra
2002 – Division V, Halland Norra
2001 – Division V, Halland Södra
2000 – Division VI, Halland Södra
1999 – Division VI, Halland Södra

== Attendances ==
In recent seasons Stafsinge IF have had the following average attendances:

Season	Average Attendance	Division / Section	Level
2008	Not available	Div 4 Halland Elit	Tier 6
2009	146	Div 4 Halland Elit	Tier 6
2010	164	Div 4 Halland Elit	Tier 6

* Attendances are provided in the Publikliga sections of the Svenska Fotbollförbundet website.

== Notable Managers ==
- (Sweden) Magnus Haglund
