= Sebastian Senatore =

Uruguayan footballer (born 1985)

Sebastian "Senna" Senatore
Personal information
- Full name: Sebastian Senatore
- Date of birth: 17 December 1985 (age 40)
- Place of birth: Montevideo, Uruguay
- Height: 1.80 m (5 ft 11 in)
- Position: Defender

Team information
- Current team: Nacka FF

Youth career
- Haningepojkarna
- 1998–2002: Hammarby IF

Senior career*
Years	Team	Apps	(Gls)
2003–2004	Hammarby TFF		
2005–2006	Hammarby IF	0	(0)
2006–2008	Montevideo Wanderers	2	(0)
2008	Syrianska FC	0	(0)
2008–2009	Vasalunds IF	37	(1)
2010–2012	Gefle IF	25	(0)
2012	Varbergs BoIS	8	(0)
2012–2013	AFC United	2	(0)
2013–2014	Huddinge IF	0	(0)
2014–	Nacka FF	0	(0)
- * Club domestic league appearances and goals as of 11 August 2014

Sebastian Senatore (born 17 December 1985) is a Uruguayan-born Swedish footballer who plays for Nacka FF as a defender.
