= Andreas Tobiasson =

Swedish footballer

Personal information
- Full name: Andreas Tobiasson
- Date of birth: 14 December 1983 (age 42)
- Height: 1.86 m (6 ft 1 in)
- Position: Defender

Youth career
- –2003: Jonsereds IF

Senior career*
Years	Team	Apps	(Gls)
2004–2009	GAIS	107	(8)
2009	Vasalunds IF (loan)	2	(0)
2010–2011	Ljungskile SK	4	(0)
Total		113	(8)

International career
	Sweden U-21	1	(0)
- * Club domestic league appearances and goals

Andreas Tobiasson (born 14 December 1983) is a Swedish former professional footballer who played as a defender.

== Club career ==
Tobiasson came to the club from Jonsereds IF in 2004, he left after several years GAIS and joined to Vasalunds IF. He played for Ljungskile SK between 2010 and 2011

== International career ==
Tobiasson has made one U-21 match for Sweden.
