= Hagahöjdens BK =

Swedish football club

- Full name: Hagahöjdens Bollklubb
- Founded: 1945
- Ground: Himmelstalund Norra; Norrköping; Sweden
- Chairman: Håkan Gustavsson
- League: Division 4 Östergötland Östra, 8th
- 2019: 8th
Home colours	Away colours

Hagahöjdens BK is a Swedish football club located in Norrköping.

== Background ==
Hagahöjdens BK currently plays in Division 4 Östergötland Östra which is the sixth tier of Swedish football. They play their home matches at the Himmelstalund Norra in Norrköping.

The club is affiliated to Östergötlands Fotbollförbund.

== Season to season ==
Season	Level	Division	Section	Position	Movements
1993	Tier 5	Division 4	Östergötland Östra	7th	
1994	Tier 5	Division 4	Östergötland Östra	7th	
1995	Tier 5	Division 4	Östergötland Östra	1st	Promoted
1996	Tier 4	Division 3	Nordöstra Götaland	11th	Relegated
1997	Tier 5	Division 4	Östergötland Östra	2nd	Promotion Playoffs
1998	Tier 5	Division 4	Östergötland Östra	5th	
1999	Tier 5	Division 4	Östergötland Östra	4th	
2000	Tier 5	Division 4	Östergötland Östra	1st	Promoted
2001	Tier 4	Division 3	Nordöstra Götaland	11th	Relegated
2002	Tier 5	Division 4	Östergötland Östra	3rd	
2003	Tier 5	Division 4	Östergötland Östra	10th	
2004	Tier 5	Division 4	Östergötland Östra	10th	Relegated
2005	Tier 6	Division 5	Östergötland Östra	4th	
2006*	Tier 7	Division 5	Östergötland Östra	2nd	Promoted
2007	Tier 6	Division 4	Östergötland Östra	8th	
2008	Tier 6	Division 4	Östergötland Östra	3rd	
2009	Tier 6	Division 4	Östergötland Östra	4th	
2010	Tier 6	Division 4	Östergötland Östra	6th	
2011	Tier 6	Division 4	Östergötland Östra	2nd	promotion playoffs
2012	Tier 6	Division 4	Östergötland Östra	2nd	promotion playoffs
2013	Tier 6	Division 4	Östergötland Östra	4th	
2014	Tier 6	Division 4	Östergötland Östra	9th	
2015	Tier 6	Division 4	Östergötland Östra	4th	
2016	Tier 6	Division 4	Östergötland Östra	5th	
2017	Tier 6	Division 4	Östergötland Östra	6th	
2018	Tier 6	Division 4	Östergötland Östra	7th	
2019	Tier 6	Division 4	Östergötland Östra	8th	
2020	Tier 6	Division 4	Östergötland Östra		

* League restructuring in 2006 resulted in a new division being created at Tier 3 and subsequent divisions dropping a level.
