= Robin Wikman =

Finnish-Swedish footballer (born 1986)

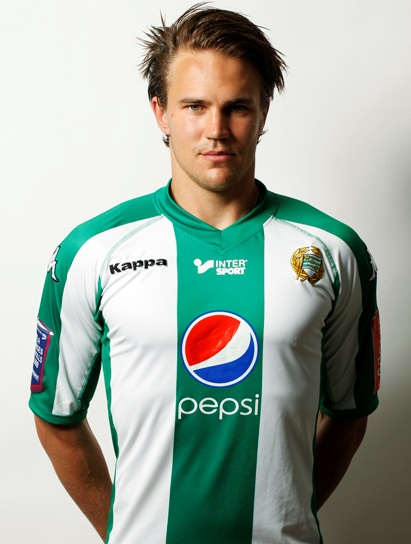
- Wikman in 2011

Personal information
- Full name: Robin Carl-Markus Christoffer Wikman
- Date of birth: 21 January 1986 (age 40)
- Place of birth: Helsinki, Finland
- Height: 1.78 m (5 ft 10 in)
- Position: Defender

Youth career
- 2003–2004: Bjärreds IF

Senior career*
Years	Team	Apps	(Gls)
2005–2008	Landskrona BoIS	67	(0)
2009	BK Häcken	2	(0)
2010–2011	Hammarby IF	11	(0)
2012–2013	Nacka FF	20	(0)
2015–2017	FC Stockholm Internazionale		

International career
2007–2008	Finland U21	5	(0)
- * Club domestic league appearances and goals

Robin Wikman (born 21 January 1986) is a Finnish-Swedish former footballer who last played for FC Stockholm Internazionale. He holds both Finnish and Swedish citizenship.

== Career ==
He has previously played four seasons in Landskrona BoIS; one season by BK Häcken, Hammarby IF and Nacka FF.

=== International ===
He was a member of the Finnish U-21 national football team during the u21 2009 campaign.
