= Simon Leonidsson =

Swedish footballer

Personal information
- Date of birth: 17 January 1992 (age 34)
- Place of birth: Örebro, Sweden
- Height: 1.74 m (5 ft 9 in)
- Position: Forward

Youth career
- 1996–1999: Örebro SK
- 2002–2007: BK Forward

Senior career*
Years	Team	Apps	(Gls)
2008–2009	BK Forward	15	(0)
2010–2012	Örebro SK	2	(0)
2010–2011	→ Örebro SK Ungdom	14	(0)
2012	→ Karlslunds IF (loan)	0	(0)
2013–2017	Rynninge IK		

International career
2009	Sweden U17	5	(0)
- * Club domestic league appearances and goals as of 18:21, 18 May 2012 (UTC)

Simon Leonidsson (born 17 January 1992) is a Swedish retired footballer who played as a forward.
