= Mikael Eklund =

Swedish footballer

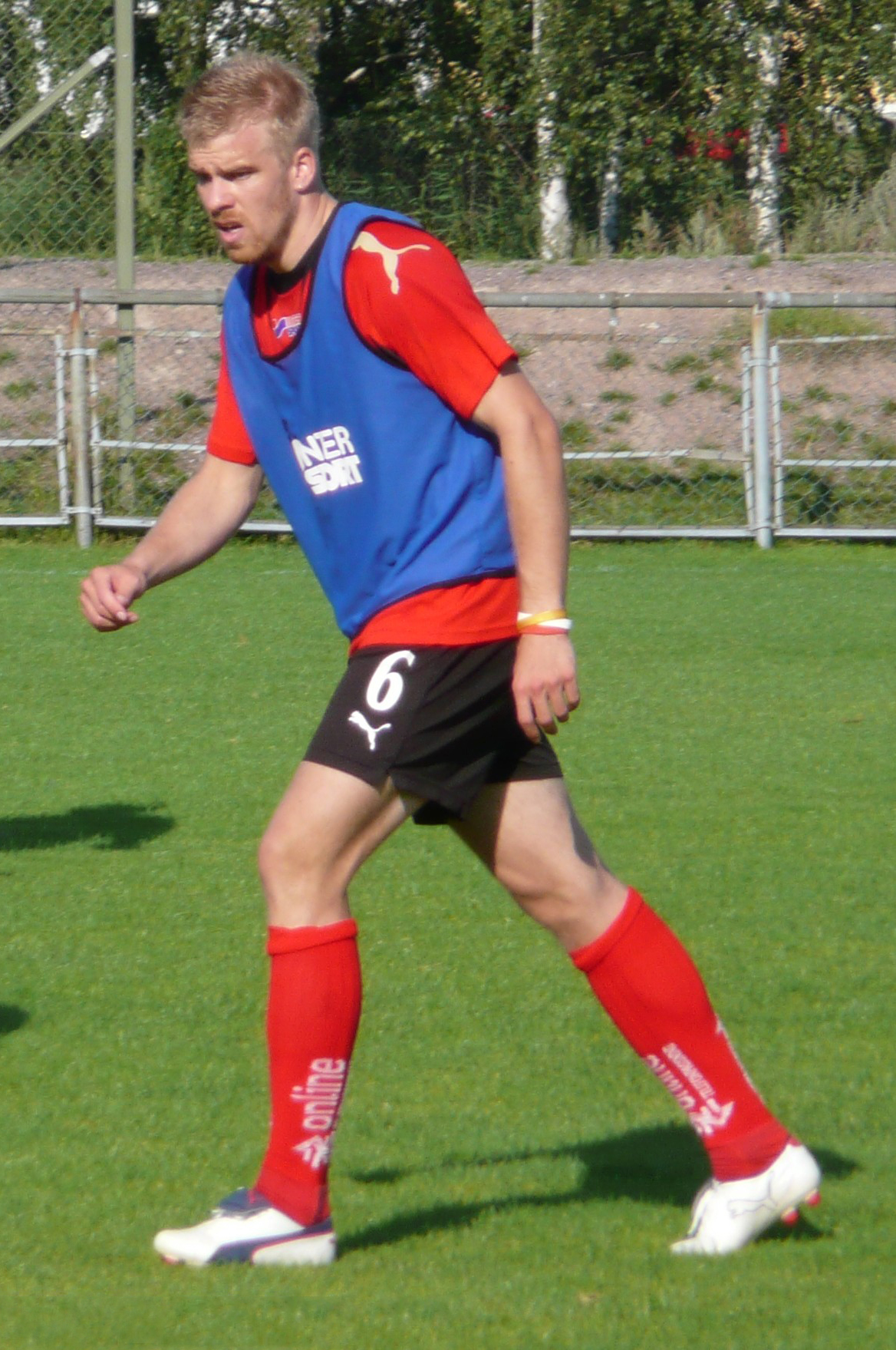

Personal information
- Full name: Johan Mikael Eklund
- Date of birth: 14 September 1981 (age 45)
- Place of birth: Borlänge, Sweden
- Height: 1.82 m (6 ft 0 in)
- Position: Defender

Team information
- Current team: IK Brage
- Number: 25

Youth career
- Forssa BK

Senior career*
Years	Team	Apps	(Gls)
1999	Forssa BK		
2000–2002	IK Brage	69	(3)
2003–2009	Kalmar FF	100	(2)
2010	Assyriska FF	1	(0)
2011–	IK Brage	18	(0)
2012	→ Grindavík (loan)	14	(1)
- * Club domestic league appearances and goals as of 4 October 2011

Johan Mikael Eklund (born 14 September 1981) is a Swedish footballer who plays for IK Brage as a defender.

== Career ==
Eklund started his career in Forssa BK of Borlänge. Eklund got his breakthrough when playing for IK Brage in Superettan, and he signed for Kalmar FF in 2003. He won the Swedish championship, Allsvenskan, in 2008 with Kalmar FF.
