= Tobias Johansson =

Swedish footballer

Personal information
- Full name: Tobias Johansson
- Date of birth: 27 January 1982 (age 44)
- Place of birth: Sweden
- Height: 1.83 m (6 ft 0 in)
- Position: Midfielder

Youth career
- Hånger IF

Senior career*
Years	Team	Apps	(Gls)
1998–1999	IFK Värnamo	31	(0)
2000–2004	Helsingborgs IF	10	(1)
2005–2009	Mjällby AIF	127	(15)
2010–2012	Ängelholms FF	28	(6)

International career
1999–2000	Sweden U18	5	(0)
- * Club domestic league appearances and goals as of 7 July 2012

Tobias Johansson (born 27 January 1982) is a Swedish retired footballer who played as a midfielder. His last club was Ängelholms FF.
