= Lärje-Angereds IF =

Swedish football club

- Full name: Lärje-Angereds Idrottsförening
- Nickname: LAIF
- Founded: 1988; 38 years ago
- Ground: Bläsebovallen; Angered; Gothenburg; Sweden
- Chairman: Roger Martinssons
- League: Division 2 Västra Götaland
- 2012: Division 3 Mellersta Götaland, 1st (Promoted)
Home colours	Away colours

Lärje-Angereds IF is a Swedish football club located in Angered, a suburb in Gothenburg Municipality.

== Background ==
Since their foundation, Lärje-Angereds IF has participated mainly in the middle and lower divisions of the Swedish football league system. The club currently plays in Division 2 Västra Götaland which is the fourth tier of Swedish football. The club spent 3 seasons in Division 2 Västra Götaland from 2006 to 2008, but after two consecutive relegations dropped to Division 4 Göteborg A for the 2010 season. With much improved form in 2010, LAIF won their Division 4 section to clinch promotion back to Division 3. They play their home matches at the Bläsebovallen in Angered.

Lärje-Angereds IF are affiliated to Göteborgs Fotbollförbund.

== Youth Development ==
Larje-Angereds IF have a successful youth development programme which has been reflected by the recent emergence of two talented young players. Amin Affane agreed to join Chelsea FC in January 2010, leaving Lärje-Angereds IF to head to London ahead of interest from some of Europe's biggest teams. The 17-year-old left-footed attacking midfielder has represented Sweden at Under-16 level.

Another Larje-Angereds IF youngster Anjur Osmanović revealed in February 2011 that he has also left the club to join Chelsea FC. The 16-year-old midfielder has Bosnian roots. Anjur Osmanovic told Swedish daily newspaper, Aftonbladet, that he had a lot of offers from England but in the end chose Chelsea in order to continue his development. He is reported to have signed a three-year contract.

== Season to season ==
Season	Level	Division	Section	Position	Movements
1999	Tier 6	Division 5	Göteborg A	6th	
2000	Tier 6	Division 5	Göteborg A	1st	Promoted
2001	Tier 5	Division 4	Göteborg A	7th	
2002	Tier 5	Division 4	Göteborg A	2nd	Promotion Playoffs – Promoted
2003	Tier 4	Division 3	Nordvästra Götaland	2nd	Promotion Playoffs
2004	Tier 4	Division 3	Nordvästra Götaland	2nd	Promotion Playoffs
2005	Tier 4	Division 3	Nordvästra Götaland	1st	Promoted
2006*	Tier 4	Division 2	Västra Götaland	2nd	
2007	Tier 4	Division 2	Västra Götaland	7th	
2008	Tier 4	Division 2	Västra Götaland	12th	Relegated
2009	Tier 5	Division 3	Nordvästra Götaland	12th	Relegated
2010	Tier 6	Division 4	Göteborg A	1st	Promoted
2011	Tier 5	Division 3	Nordvästra Götaland	3rd	
2012	Tier 5	Division 3	Mellersta Götaland	1st	Promoted
2013	Tier 4	Division 2	Västra Götaland	2nd	
2014	Tier 4	Division 2	Norra Götaland	5th	

* League restructuring in 2006 resulted in a new division being created at Tier 3 and subsequent divisions dropping a level.

== Attendances ==
In recent seasons Lärje-Angereds IF have had the following average attendances:

Season	Average attendance	Division / Section	Level
2002	Not available	Div 4 Göteborg A	Tier 5
2003	167	Div 3 Nordvästra Götaland	Tier 4
2004	177	Div 3 Nordvästra Götaland	Tier 4
2005	126	Div 3 Nordvästra Götaland	Tier 4
2006	186	Div 2 Västra Götaland	Tier 4
2007	191	Div 2 Västra Götaland	Tier 4
2008	144	Div 2 Västra Götaland	Tier 4
2009	80	Div 3 Nordvästra Götaland	Tier 5
2010	67	Div 4 Göteborg A	Tier 6

* Attendances are provided in the Publikliga sections of the Svenska Fotbollförbundet website and European Football Statistics website.
