= Värmbols FC =

Swedish football club

- Full name: Värmbols Football Club
- Nickname(s): VFC
- Founded: 1990
- Ground: Backavallen; Katrineholm; Sweden
- Capacity: 4,000
- Head coach: Håkan "Vargen" Andersson
- Coach: Tony Lundkvist
- League: Division 2 Södra Svealand
- 2019: Division 2 Södra Svealand, 8th
Home colours

Värmbols FC is a Swedish football club located in Katrineholm in Södermanland County.

== Background ==
In 1990 it was decided to divide Värmbols GoIF into 3 clubs, namely FC Värmbols, DFK Värmbol (Värmbol Women's Football Club) and KVBK (Katrineholm Värmbol Bandyklubb). Värmbols Football Club was formed on 3 December 1990.

Since their foundation Värmbols FC has participated mainly in the lower divisions of the Swedish football league system including a spell in Division 5 from 2000 to 2002. The club currently plays in Division 2 Södra Svealand which is the fourth tier of Swedish football. They play their home matches at the Backavallen in Katrineholm.

The club is affiliated to the Södermanlands Fotbollförbund.

== Season to season ==
Season	Level	Division	Section	Position	Movements
1993	Tier 4	Division 3	Östra Svealand	12th	Relegated
1994	Tier 5	Division 4	Södermanland	4th	
1995	Tier 5	Division 4	Södermanland	2nd	Promotion Playoffs
1996	Tier 5	Division 4	Södermanland	3rd	
1997	Tier 5	Division 4	Södermanland	2nd	Promotion Playoffs
1998	Tier 5	Division 4	Södermanland	4th	
1999	Tier 5	Division 4	Södermanland	11th	Relegated
2000	Tier 6	Division 5	Södermanland	4th	
2001	Tier 6	Division 5	Södermanland	3rd	
2002	Tier 6	Division 5	Södermanland	2nd	Promoted
2003	Tier 5	Division 4	Södermanland	6th	
2004	Tier 5	Division 4	Södermanland	4th	Promoted
2005	Tier 4	Division 3	Västra Svealand	7th	
2006*	Tier 5	Division 3	Östra Svealand	1st	Promoted
2007	Tier 4	Division 2	Östra Svealand	6th	
2008	Tier 4	Division 2	Östra Svealand	6th	
2009	Tier 4	Division 2	Östra Svealand	2nd	
2010	Tier 4	Division 2	Södra Svealand	6th	
2011	Tier 4	Division 2	Södra Svealand	4th	
2012	Tier 4	Division 2	Södra Svealand	5th	
2013	Tier 4	Division 2	Södra Svealand		

* League restructuring in 2006 resulted in a new division being created at Tier 3 and subsequent divisions dropping a level.
