= Enskede IK =

Swedish football club

- Full name: Enskede Idrottsklubb
- Nickname: EIK
- Founded: 1914
- Ground: Enskede IP; Gamla Enskede; Sweden
- Capacity: 1,000
- Chairman: Pontus Gustafsson
- Head coach: Lukas Gummesson
- Coach: Andrei Zaporojan
- League: Division 2 Norra Svealand
- 2019: Division 2 Södra Svealand, 4th
Home colours	Away colours

Enskede IK is a Swedish football club located in Gamla Enskede, Stockholm.

== Background ==
Since their foundation in 1914 Enskede IK has participated mainly in the lower divisions of the Swedish football league system but since 2004 they have resided in Division 2. The club currently plays in Division 2 Södra Svealand which is the fourth tier of Swedish football. They play their home matches at the Enskede IP in Enskede.

Today EIK is one of Sweden's biggest football clubs with over 140 teams. A few years ago, Enskede IK had bandy and hockey teams, too, but today it is just a football club.

From 1989 to 2005, the club president was the Swedish politician Bo Ringholm.

== Season to season ==
Season	Level	Division	Section	Position	Movements
1993	Tier 5	Division 4	Stockholm Södra	2nd	
1994	Tier 5	Division 4	Stockholm Södra	1st	Promoted
1995	Tier 4	Division 3	Östra Svealand	12th	Relegated
1996	Tier 5	Division 4	Stockholm Södra	4th	
1997	Tier 5	Division 4	Stockholm Södra	4th	
1998	Tier 5	Division 4	Stockholm Södra	2nd	Promotion Playoffs
1999	Tier 5	Division 4	Stockholm Södra	2nd	
2000	Tier 5	Division 4	Stockholm Södra	7th	
2001	Tier 5	Division 4	Stockholm Södra	2nd	Promotion Playoffs – Promoted
2002	Tier 4	Division 3	Östra Svealand	7th	
2003	Tier 4	Division 3	Östra Svealand	1st	Promoted
2004	Tier 3	Division 2	Östra Svealand	9th	
2005	Tier 3	Division 2	Östra Svealand	6th	
2006*	Tier 4	Division 2	Östra Svealand	3rd	
2007	Tier 4	Division 2	Östra Svealand	7th	
2008	Tier 4	Division 2	Östra Svealand	4th	
2009	Tier 4	Division 2	Östra Svealand	6th	
2010	Tier 4	Division 2	Södra Svealand	2nd	
2011	Tier 4	Division 2	Södra Svealand	3rd	
2012	Tier 4	Division 2	Södra Svealand	4th	
2013	Tier 4	Division 2	Södra Svealand	2nd	
2014	Tier 4	Division 2	Södra Svealand	3rd	
2015	Tier 4	Division 2	Norra Svealand	1st	Promoted
2016	Tier 3	Division 1	Norra	9th	
2017	Tier 3	Division 1	Norra	13th	Relegated
2018	Tier 4	Division 2	Södra Svealand	5th	
2019	Tier 4	Division 2	Södra Svealand	4th	
2020	Tier 4	Division 2	Södra Svealand		

* League restructuring in 2006 resulted in a new division being created at Tier 3 and subsequent divisions dropping a level.

== Attendances ==
In recent seasons Enskede IK have had the following average attendances:

Season	Average attendance	Division / Section	Level
2005	128	Div 2 Östra Svealand	Tier 3
2006	104	Div 2 Östra Svealand	Tier 4
2007	127	Div 2 Östra Svealand	Tier 4
2008	127	Div 2 Östra Svealand	Tier 4
2009	146	Div 2 Östra Svealand	Tier 4
2010	149	Div 2 Södra Svealand	Tier 4
2011	125	Div 2 Södra Svealand	Tier 4
2012	84	Div 2 Södra Svealand	Tier 4
2013	194	Div 2 Södra Svealand	Tier 4
2014	162	Div 2 Södra Svealand	Tier 4
2015	124	Div 2 Norra Svealand	Tier 4
2016	187	Div 1 Norra Svealand	Tier 3
2017	158	Div 1 Norra Svealand	Tier 3
2018	?	Div 2 Södra Svealand	Tier 4
2019	?	Div 2 Södra Svealand	Tier 4
2020		Div 2 Södra Svealand	Tier 4

* Attendances are provided in the Publikliga sections of the Svenska Fotbollförbundet website.

== First-team squad ==
As of June 2025

Note: Flags indicate national team as defined under FIFA eligibility rules; some limited exceptions apply. Players may hold more than one non-FIFA nationality.

No.	Pos.	Nation	Player
1	GK	SWE	Andreas Carlsson
2	DF	SWE	Jakub Stadnicki
4	DF	SWE	Joel Lundgren
5	MF	SWE	Lukas Lilja
6	MF	SWE	Alekh Singh
7	FW	SWE	Kristijan Cosic
8	DF	SWE	Tobias Enhörning
10	FW	SWE	Stefan Ostojic
11	MF	SWE	Charbel Georges
12		SWE	Malik Aiobov
13		SWE	Robin Johansson
14		SWE	Emil Åhrberg

No.	Pos.	Nation	Player
15	FW	SWE	Jonathan Skoglund
16		SWE	Loke Fernström
17	FW	SWE	Ljeutrim Makolli
18	MF	SWE	Emil Marletta
19	DF	SWE	Samuel Johansson
21	DF	SWE	William Tallén
22	MF	SWE	Mattias Nyberg
23	DF	SWE	Daniel Strandsäter
24	MF	SWE	Oscar Sears
55	GK	SWE	Linus Rudman
—	GK	SWE	Carl Axel Persson

== Notable alumni ==
- Noah Sonko Sundberg
- Anton Salétros
- Oscar Krusnell
- Oliver Dovin
- Benny Lekström
- Björn Runström
- Daniel Örlund
- Andi Toompuu
- Magdalena Eriksson
