= List of IF Elfsborg records and statistics =

IF Elfsborg is a Swedish professional football club based in Borås. In 2012 Elfsborg, played their 69th season in Allsvenskan from its inception in 1924 up to and including the 2012 season. This placing them on a 5th place of those teams who have participated in total seasons. They have also played top flight football continually in Sweden since 1997, which currently is the 3rd longest top flight tenure of any club in Sweden—the longest one is IFK Göteborg, since 1977.

The club is currently placed 5th in the all-time Allsvenskan table, "maratontabellen" in Swedish, which is a cumulative record of all match results, points, and goals of every team that has played in Allsvenskan since its inception in 1924–25. Furthermore, Elfsborg is placed 6th in the all-time medal table, with a total of 24 medals of different value – the most recent received in 2012.

The player in IF Elfsborg who holds most club and national records is Sven Jonasson. In 409 games, most appearances ever in Elfsborg, he scored a total of 252 goals in Allsvenskan, which makes it an all-time record. He played in Elfsborg throughout his career, which started in 1927 and ended 1947, a total of 20 years. The most remarkable achievement is his unbroken record of 344 consecutive games. A sequence that was broken when he missed his first game in 14 years because he failed to receive furlough during his military service. He was also the first goalscorer ever for the Sweden men's national football team in a World Cup. It was in the 1934 FIFA World Cup, where he scored two goals in Sweden's 3–2 victory against Argentina.

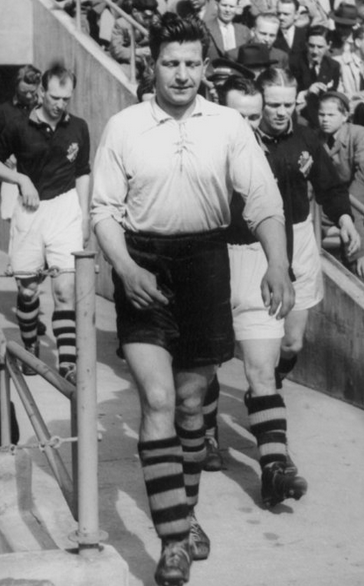
Sven Jonasson, record holder of most consecutive games and goals scored in Allsvenskan.

This article is about the statistics and records of the football section of IF Elfsborg.

== Honours ==
=== Domestic ===

The lineup who managed to win the league title, Allsvenskan, with a 1–0 home victory against Djurgårdens IF, 5 November 2006.
- Swedish Champions:^{[A]}
  - Winners (6): 1935–36, 1938–39, 1939–40, 1961, 2006, 2012

==== League ====
- Allsvenskan:
  - Winners (6): 1935–36, 1938–39, 1939–40, 1961, 2006, 2012
  - Runners-up (6): 1942–43, 1943–44, 1944–45, 1965, 1977, 2008
- Division 1 Södra:
  - Winners (1): 1996
  - Runners-up (1): 1991
- Division 2 Götaland:
  - Winners (1): 1960
  - Runners-up (4): 1955–56, 1956–57, 1957–58, 1959
- Division 2 Västsvenska Serien:
  - Winners (1): 1925–26
  - Runners-up (2): 1914–15, 1923–24

==== Cups ====
- Svenska Cupen:
  - Winners (2): 2001, 2003
  - Runners-up (3): 1942, 1980–81, 1996–97
- Svenska Supercupen:
  - Winners (1): 2007

=== European ===
- UEFA Intertoto Cup:
  - Winners (2): 1980, 2008
  - Runners-up (1): 1961
- The Atlantic Cup:
  - Winners (1): 2011

== Player records ==
=== Appearances ===
- Most Allsvenskan appearances: Sven Jonasson, 409
- Most consecutive appearances: Sven Jonasson, 344 (1927–41)

==== Most appearances ====
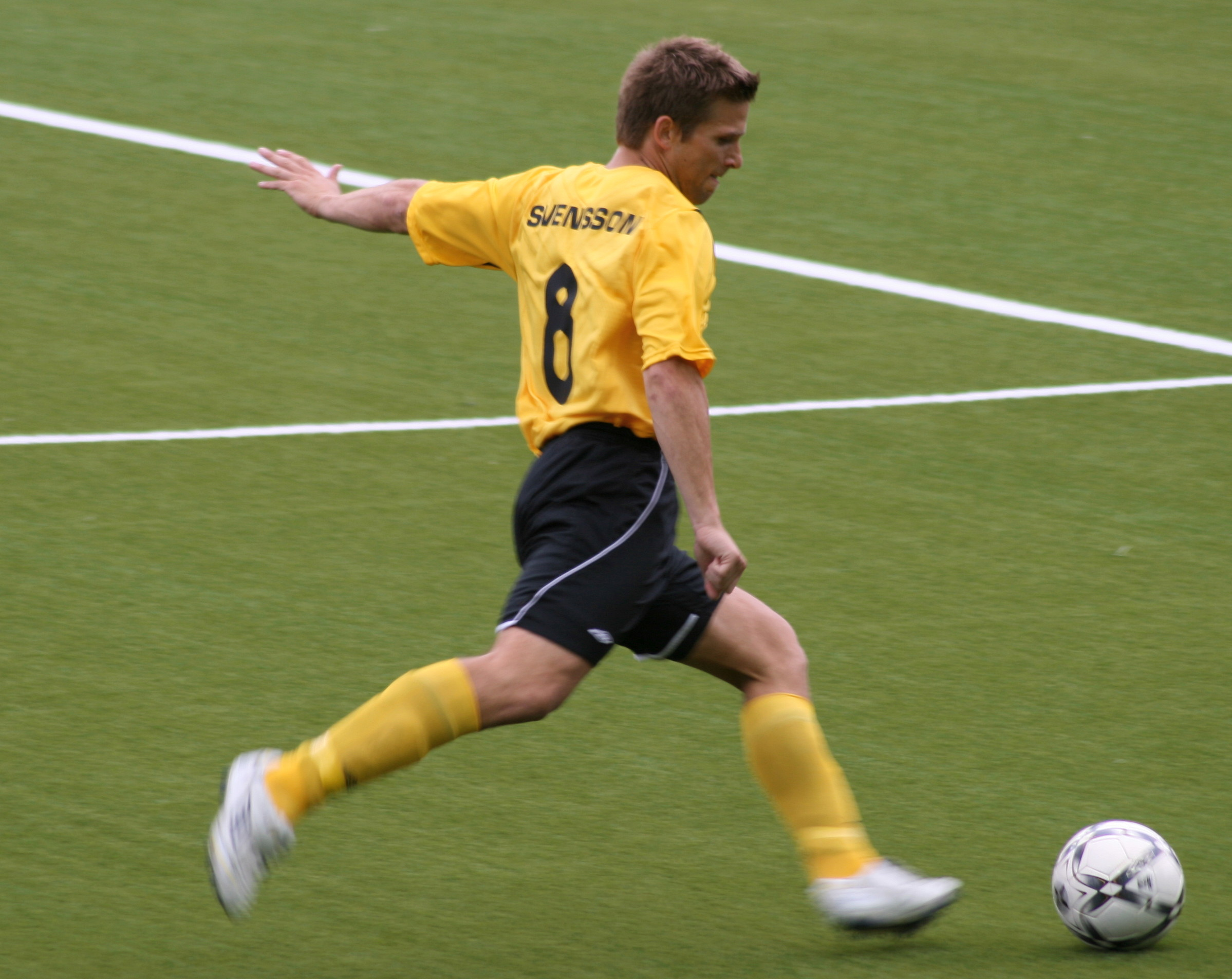
Anders Svensson placing himself on a 4th place on the most appearances in IF Elfsborg.

Competitive matches only, includes appearances as substitute. Numbers in brackets indicate goals scored.

#	Name	Years	League
1	(Sweden) Sven Jonasson	1927–1947	409
2	(Sweden) Karl-Erik Grahn	1932–1949	346
3	(Sweden) Leif Målberg	1965–1971; 1973–1980	337
4	(Sweden) Anders Svensson	1997–2001; 2005–	289
5	(Sweden) Leif Gustafsson	1970–1971; 1973–1982; 1984	276
6	(Sweden) Thomas Johansson	1973–83	276
7	(Sweden) Arvid Samuelsson	1933–1947	270
8	(Sweden) Johan Karlsson	2001–2011	263
9	(Sweden) Göran Ahlström	1969–1971; 1973–1981	258
10	(Sweden) Thomas Ahlström	1971; 1973–1979; 1982–1984	237

=== Goalscorers ===
- Most Allsvenskan goals: Sven Jonasson, 252

==== Top goalscorers ====
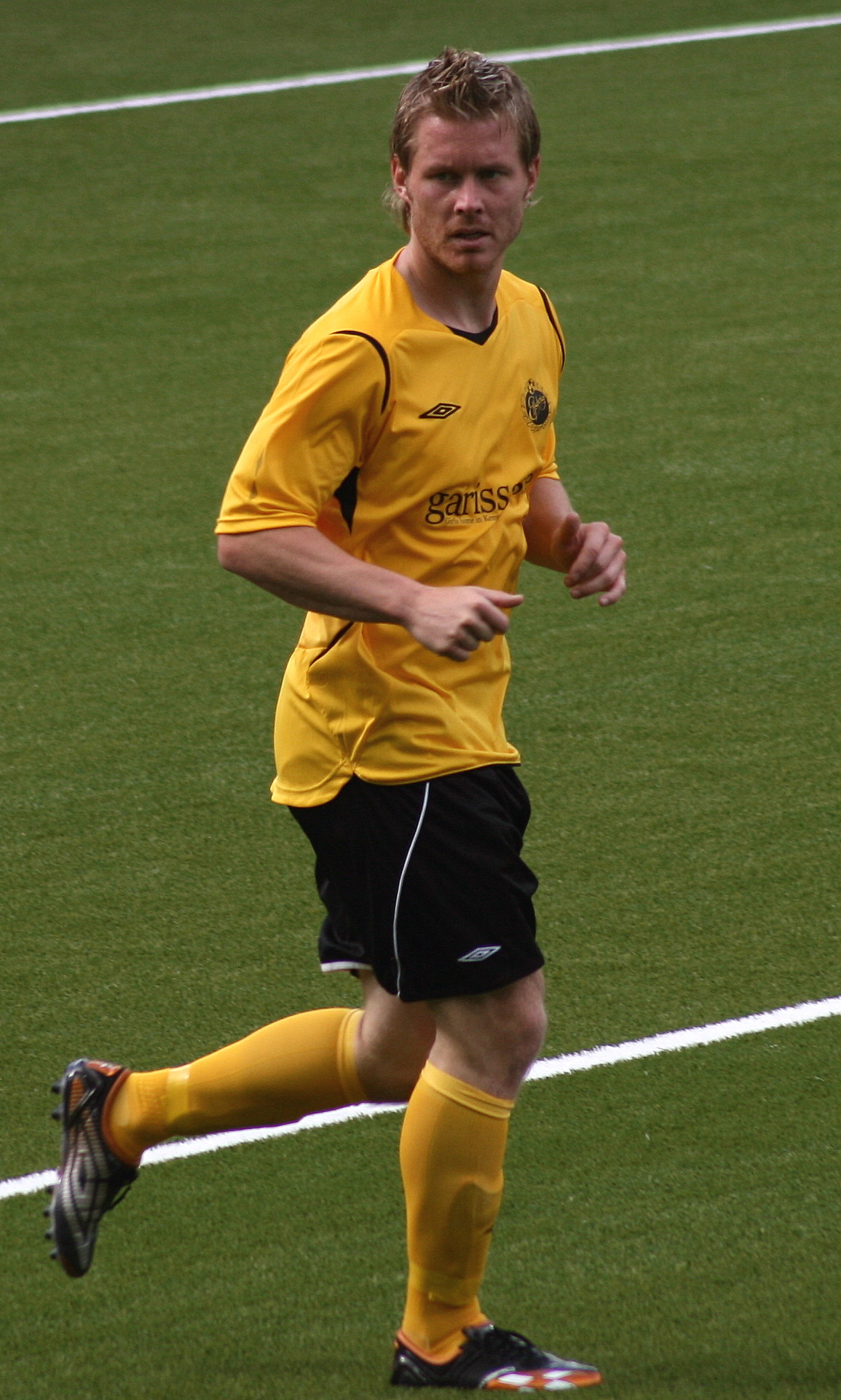
Fredrik Berglund being one of the top-ten scorers.

Competitive matches only. Numbers in brackets indicate appearances made.

#	Name	Years	League
1	(Sweden) Sven Jonasson	1927–1947	252
2	(Sweden) Thomas Ahlström	1971; 1973–1979; 1982–1984	101
3	(Sweden) Knut Johansson	1936–1944	92
4	(Sweden) Henry Larsson	1952–1954; 1961–1968	80
5	(Sweden) Åke Samuelsson	1930–1941	76
6	(Sweden) Gillis Andersson	1933–1943	67
7	(Sweden) Ove Grahn	1961–1965	62
8	(Sweden) Karl-Erik Grahn	1932–1949	57
9	(Sweden) Anders Svensson	1997–2001; 2005–2015	56
10	(Sweden) Fredrik Berglund	1997–2001; 2003; 2007–2010	54

=== International ===
- Most capped Elfsborg player for Sweden while playing for the club: Anders Svensson, 89 caps whilst an Elfsborg player

== Club records ==
=== Matches ===
- Biggest victory, Svenska cupen: 19–0 vs. Varbergs BoIS, 21 January 1996*

==== Record wins ====
- Record win: 19–0 (against Varbergs BoIS, Svenska Cupen, 21 January 1996)
- Record Allsvenskan win: 12–2 (against IFK Eskilstuna, 19 April 1936)
- Record European win: 8–0 (against 8–0 vs. Floriana F.C., UEFA Europa League, 5 July 2012
- Record home win: Allsvenskan: 10–1 (against Degerfors IF, 28 August 1938)

==== Record defeats ====
- Record Allsvenskan defeat: Allsvenskan: 0–7 (against GAIS, 25 August 1926)

=== Attendances ===
Only competitive first-team matches are considered.

- Highest home attendance: 22,654 (against IFK Norrköping, Allsvenskan, 1961) at Ryavallen
- Highest attendance at Borås Arena: 17,070 (against Kalmar FF, Allsvenskan, 4 July 2005)
- Highest attendance at Ramnavallen: 16,340 (against AIK, Allsvenskan, 7 June 1936)
- Highest average attendance: 14,608 (1961 season)
- Highest away attendance: 48,296 (against IFK Göteborg, 2 June 1977) at Ullevi
