= Lars Hedén =

Swedish footballer and manager (1934–2013)

Personal information
- Full name: Lars Allan Hedén
- Date of birth: 4 September 1934
- Place of birth: Sweden
- Date of death: 29 April 2013 (aged 78)
- Position: Midfielder

Senior career*
Years	Team	Apps	(Gls)
1950–1955	Vänersborgs IF		
1955–1957	AIK		
1957–1959	Vänersborgs IF		
1960–1968	Norrby IF		
1969	Vänersborgs IF		
1970–1972	Norrby IF		

Managerial career
- 1970–1972: Norrby IF
- 1973–1975: IF Elfsborg
- 1976–1977: Norrby IF
- 1978–1979: GAIS
- 1980–1981: Grimsås IF
- 1984: IF Elfsborg
- * Club domestic league appearances and goals

Lars Hedén (4 September 1934 – 29 April 2013) was a Swedish football player and manager. Hedén died on 29 April 2013, at the age of 78.
