= Gabríel Gunnarsson =

Icelandic footballer

Personal information
- Full name: Gabríel Snær Gunnarsson
- Date of birth: 23 July 2008 (age 18)
- Place of birth: Oslo, Norway
- Position: Right winger

Team information
- Current team: IF Elfsborg

Youth career
- 2011–2013: IFK Norrköping
- 2013–2014: Konyaspor
- 2014–2015: BK Häcken
- 2015–2022: ÍBV
- 2022–2024: ÍA

Senior career*
Years	Team	Apps	(Gls)
2024–2026	ÍA	21	(0)
2026–	IF Elfsborg	0	(0)

International career^{‡}
2024–2025	Iceland U17	10	(0)
2025–	Iceland U19	2	(0)
- * Club domestic league appearances and goals as of 2 July 2026 ‡ National team caps and goals as of 18 November 2025

Gabríel Snær Gunnarsson (born 23 July 2008) is an Icelandic professional footballer who plays as a right winger for Allsvenskan club IF Elfsborg.

== Club career ==
On 16 May 2024, Gabríel made his professional debut with ÍA.

On 16 April 2026, it was announced that Gabríel had signed for IF Elfsborg on a three-year-contract starting in July 2026.

== International career ==
Gabríel is a youth international for Iceland.

== Personal life ==
Gabríel's father is former Iceland international and striker Gunnar Heiðar Þorvaldsson.
