= Gunnar Heiðar Þorvaldsson =

Icelandic footballer

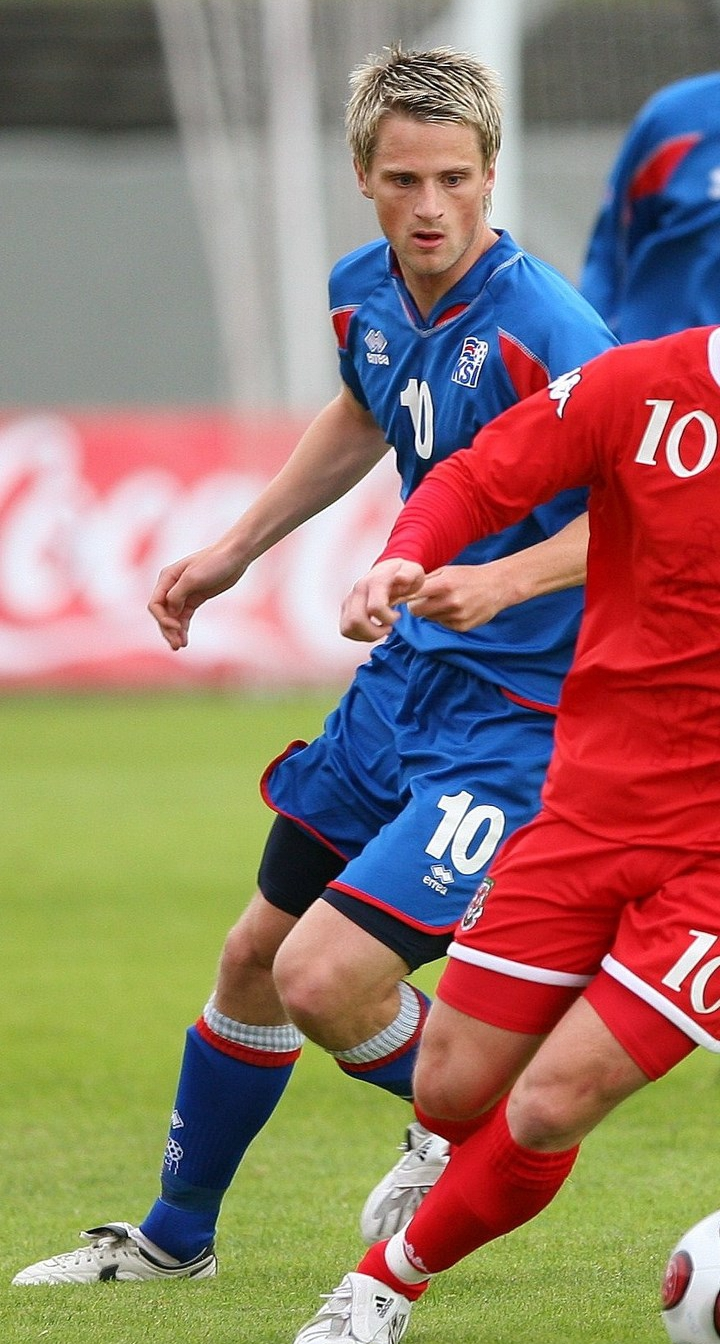
- Gunnar (blue) with Iceland in 2008

Personal information
- Full name: Gunnar Heiðar Þorvaldsson
- Date of birth: 1 April 1982 (age 44)
- Place of birth: Vestmannaeyjar, Iceland
- Height: 1.82 m (6 ft 0 in)
- Position: Striker

Senior career*
Years	Team	Apps	(Gls)
1999–2004	ÍBV	72	(37)
2004–2006	Halmstads BK	38	(16)
2006–2007	Hannover 96	7	(0)
2007–2008	→ Vålerenga (loan)	16	(4)
2008–2011	Esbjerg fB	24	(2)
2010	→ Reading (loan)	4	(0)
2010–2011	→ Fredrikstad FK (loan)	7	(3)
2011	ÍBV	0	(0)
2011–2013	IFK Norrköping	70	(34)
2013–2014	Konyaspor	12	(1)
2014–2015	BK Häcken	23	(3)
2015–2018	ÍBV	55	(24)
Total		328	(124)

International career
1998	Iceland U17	3	(0)
2000	Iceland U19	5	(1)
2002–2003	Iceland U21	7	(0)
2005–2013	Iceland	24	(5)

Managerial career
- 2021: KFS
- 2022: Vestri
- * Club domestic league appearances and goals

Gunnar Heiðar Þorvaldsson (born 1 April 1982), commonly anglicised as Gunnar Heidar Thorvaldsson, is an Icelandic football manager and former professional footballer who played as a striker.

== Club career ==
Born in Vestmannaeyjar, Iceland, Gunnar started his career at ÍBV. After establishing himself as the best striker in the Icelandic Premier League, he was transferred to Halmstads BK in Sweden in 2004. Here, he only narrowly missed out on the league title in his first year and won the Swedish golden boot in the following season (with 16 goals). He also featured in the club's UEFA Cup campaign of 2005–06, scoring a vital goal in the qualifying round victory over Sporting.

This brought him to the attention of several clubs from around Europe, before he eventually opted to move to German side Hannover 96 in March 2006 on a three-year deal. His time in Germany however was blighted by persistent injuries; he only managed to make seven appearances and scored no goals. In August 2007, after only 17 months with Hannover, he was loaned to Vålerenga. In summer 2008, he was sold to Danish club Esbjerg fB. For the latter part of the 2009–10 season, Gunnar was on loan at the English Football League Championship side Reading F.C.

Gunnar joined Norwegian side Fredrikstad FK on loan for the rest of the Norwegian 2010 season. On 17 March 2011, Gunnar signed a three-year contract with IFK Norrköping. After a prolific spell in the top Swedish league Gunnar signed a two-year contract with Turkish Süper Lig side Konyaspor on 5 August 2013.

In July 2015, Gunnar signed back with ÍBV. He retired from football following the 2018 season. In his last game, he scored a hat-trick in ÍBV's 5–2 victory against Grindavík. It was the fourth hat-trick of his career in the Icelandic top-tier league.

== International career ==
He made his international debut on 30 March 2005, as a last minute substitute in a goalless friendly draw with Italy in Padova. His first international goal came in a 4–1 World Cup qualifying victory over Malta on 8 June 2005.

== Managerial career ==
Gunnar started his manager career with KFS in 2021, leading them to promotion to 3. deild karla. In March 2022, he was hired as the manager of 1. deild karla club Vestri.

== Personal life ==
His cousin is former Reading defender Ívar Ingimarsson. His sister is international footballer Berglind Björg Þorvaldsdóttir.

His son, Gabríel Gunnarsson, plays for ÍA

== Honours ==
Individual

- Allsvenskan top scorer: 2005
