= Bosse Johansson (chairman) =

Swedish businessman (born 1965)

Bosse Johansson (born 1965) is the CEO at Swedbank Sjuhärad in Borås. He also has been a chairman of IF Elfsborg since 2004, where he replaced Sture Svensson after his resignment. He was chosen along with Elfsborg's new sporting director Stefan Andreasson.
