= Guliganerna =

Supporter group of IF Elfsborg

Guliganerna emblem representing a lion.

Guliganerna is an independent supporter association to IF Elfsborg based in Borås. The association was founded on 21 November 1991, during a time when Elfsborg's position, both sporting and economically reached rock bottom. Guliganerna members supported, however, Elfsborg more than ever as their major objective, which would later become the backbone of this supporters' association. Guliganerna set ground to the association's continued development, to today's date will be the largest fan group of IF Elfsborg and the fifth in whole Sweden under 2011.

== Policy ==
Guliganerna is an active supporters association which is open to all Elfsborg fans regardless of age, gender or standing section. This means that they are politically independent and rejects all forms of violence and racism. Guliganerna are an association with members between 0–91 years, comprising both men and women, scattered around the country. Their central location is on Elfsborgsläktaren also called heart of the Borås Arena. In 2011 Guliganerna broke their old member record and reached a total of 1155 members making them the 5th biggest supportergroup in Sweden.

Since its foundation in 1991, Guliganernas activities primarily focused on actively support IF Elfsborg at home as well as away and raise an interest in IF Elfsborg in and around Borås. Over the years we also developed a variety of custom souvenirs, member magazines, two beers with their own labels as well as produced and released four CDs with Elfsborg Music. Today, their organization has grown to include both member and local retail outlets as at Elfsborg games and various markets in Borås city.

== History ==
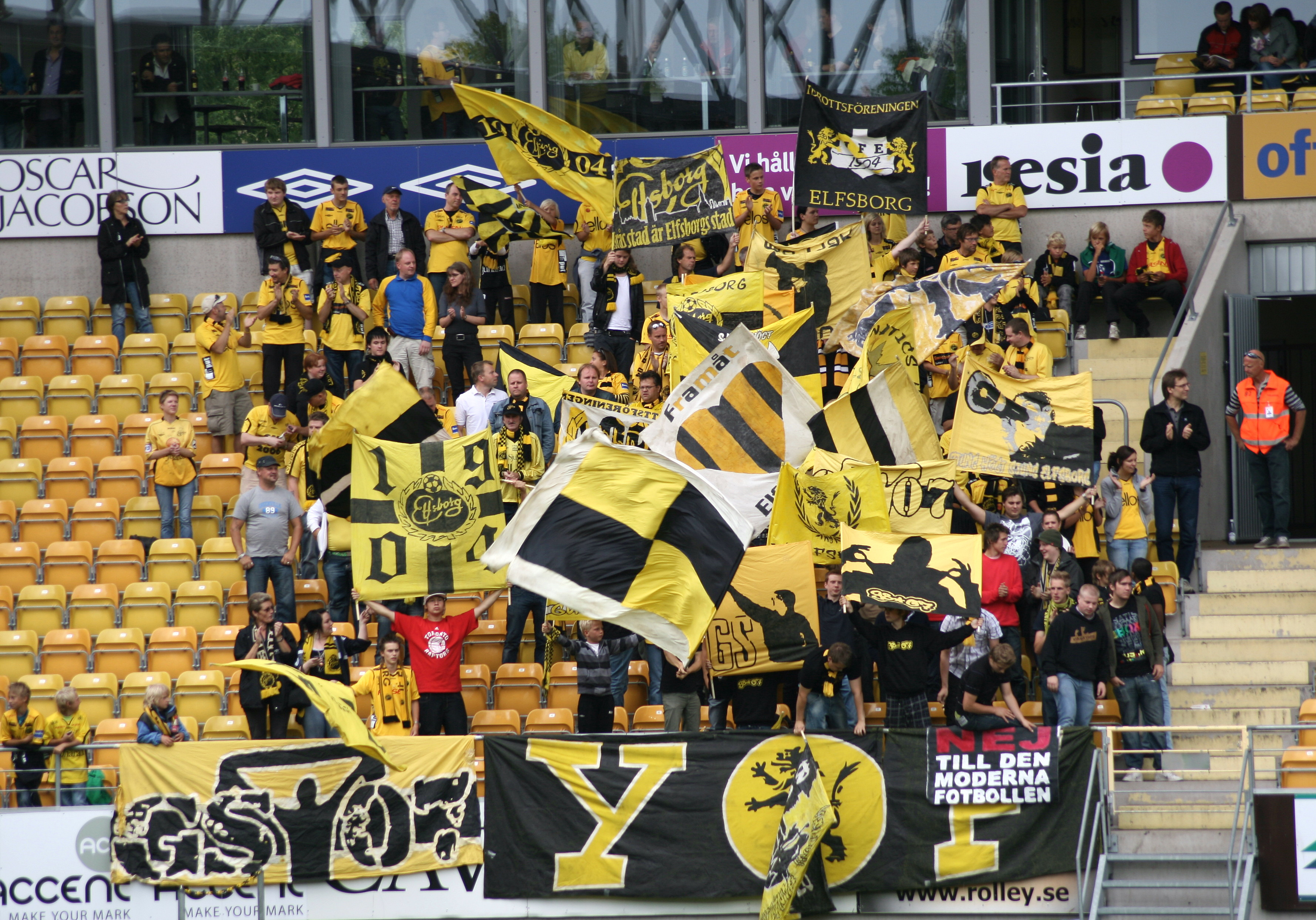
Guliganerna in a match against Riga

1991 underwent IF Elfsborg the club's probably heaviest period ever, the economy and the results weighted during the period in Söderettan. 21 November 1991, however, formed a collection of young men, a supporter compound that would become a familiar concept not only in Borås, but throughout Sweden, Guliganerna. Despite continued play in Söderettan and low public interest in all of Sweden the supporter group, Guliganerna, continued to grow. The 1990s guliganer became not known for their quantity but for their faithfulness, to always be there wherever IF Elfsborg played. After the fan bus arrived late for an away game at some point in the mid 1990s, the players looked nervous on the stand and was worried that something happened, after this incident the players had the supporters promise to not be late for the games so as not to disturb the players focus.

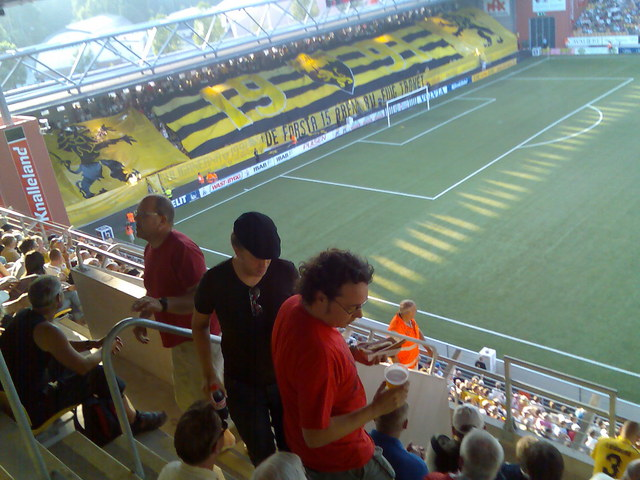
IF Elfsborg supporters Guliganerna, founded 1991, arranging a tifo.

In 1997, was IF Elfsborg back in the top tier of Swedish football and that also meant an upturn for Guliganerna, in −97 was the first Elfsborg Tifo group founded, TGD (Tifosi Guligan Divisione), who had a few tifos before the members quit for various reasons in 1999, mainly because they had no financial backing. Year 2000 became the starting year of the great generation change that occurred in Elfsborg's supporterlines until now, a group of young boys founded the current tifo group, GTS (Guligan Tifo Support), and a more youthful profile became clear among Elfsborg's supporter sections.

2006 was 45-years of waiting over. The club had won national championship which also meant an increased interest around Elfsborg. In 2011 Guliganerna had their 20th anniversary celebrated, the tribute was made in connection with the game against Kalmar FF, the players wore specially made anniversary T-shirts and GTS arranged the most expensive tifo ever in the history of the club. Guliganerna also broke during the same year, a new member record of 1155 people, making guliganerna Sweden fifth largest fan base in the 2011.

Elfsborg's main antagonist and rivalry is pointed against IFK Göteborg and has been so since all the way back in the 1920s. The geographical position between the cities makes it Elfsborg's only and closest derby also called "El Västico", which also reflects the attendance figures since it is almost always sold out in these games. Guliganerna and Peking Fanz (supporters of IFK Norrköping) however has a completely own history among Swedish supporters, a history that stands as a thorn in the eyes of other supporter organizations in Sweden. This friendship is based on that Guliganerna in the 1990s invited visiting supporters before the match, Peking Fanz invited back several times and the friendship was born. Since this friendship was born, both supporter bases now often follow each other's games, which makes Guliganerna and Peking Fanz unique. Especially between Elfsborg's only ultras group Yellow Fanatics, there are strong links with the IFK Norrköping, Peking ultras.

== Other supporter groups ==
- Yellow Fanatics
- Elfsborgs supporterklubb
- Guliganerna Bollebygd
- Skåneguliganerna
- Gamla Elfsborgare
- TGD Ultras (Tifosi Guligan Divisione)
- Guligan Tifo Support(GTS)
