= Ryavallen =

Sports venue in Borås, Sweden

Coordinates: 57°44′09″N 12°56′06″E

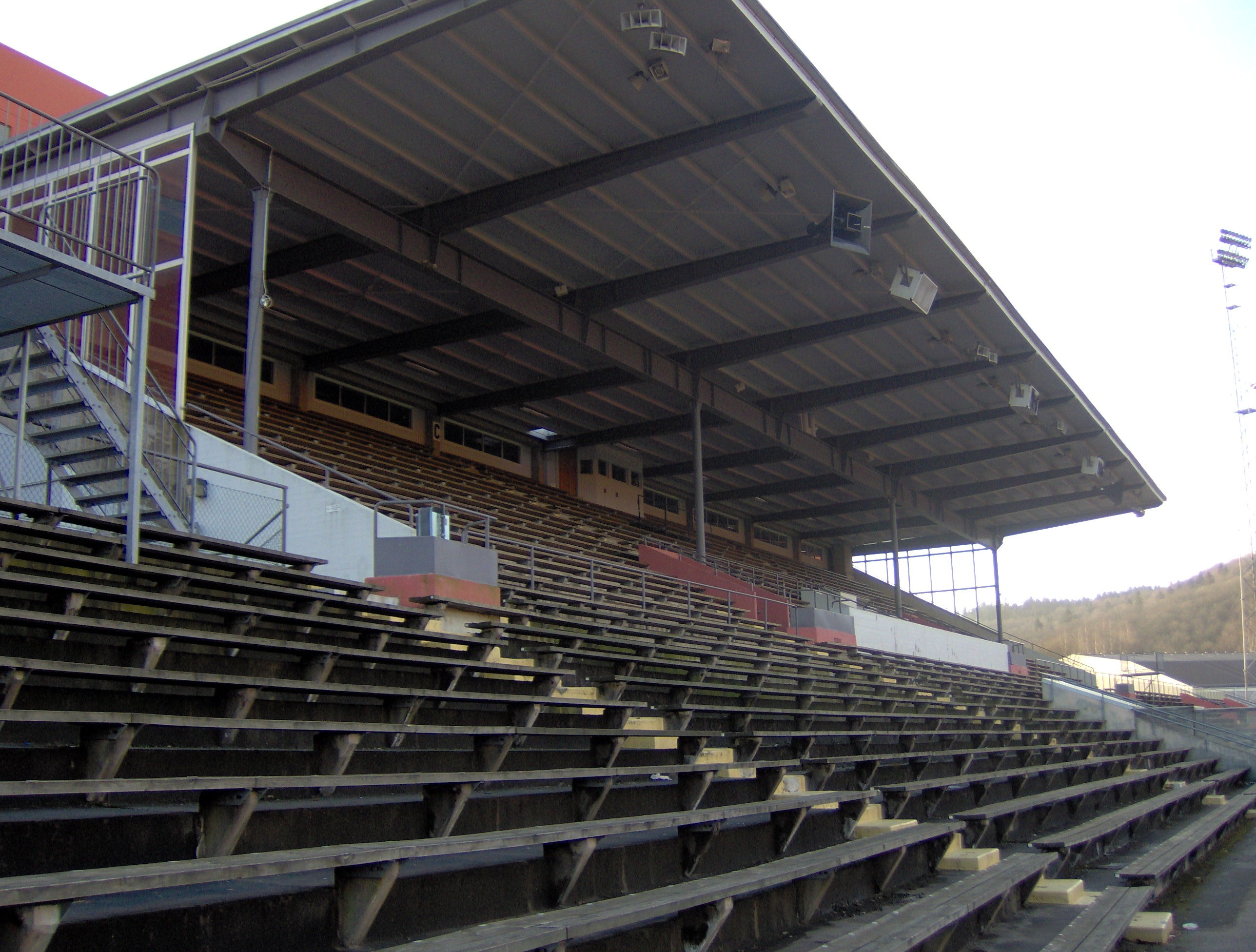
- Ryavallen mainstand in January 2008.
- Interactive map of Ryavallen
- Location: Borås, Sweden
- Capacity: 12 000
- Type: sports ground

Construction
- Opened: 17 August 1941
- Renovated: 2005, 2012

Tenants
- IF Elfsborg (1941–2004); Norrby IF

Ryavallen is a multi-purpose stadium in Borås, Sweden, mainly used for soccer and track and field athletics.

== History ==
It was inaugurated on 17 August 1941 with a soccer game where IF Elfsborg defeated Team Sweden, 2–1. It was the home ground for IF Elfsborg until 2005, when the Borås Arena was inaugurated. During the 1958 FIFA World Cup, it hosted the matches between USSR and Austria, and between England and Austria.

The record attendance is 22,654 spectators, when IF Elfsborg played IFK Norrköping in 1961. After Elfsborg had left the arena, the north stand was replaced by an indoor athletics hall. Ryavallen is currently used mostly for athletics.

The Ryavallen was a venue for motorcycle speedway and hosted the 1972 and 1973 Speedway World Pairs Championship finals and the 1972 Swedish Individual Speedway Championship.

As of today (June 2016), Ryavallen has a seating capacity of circa 12 000 spectators.

== Image gallery ==
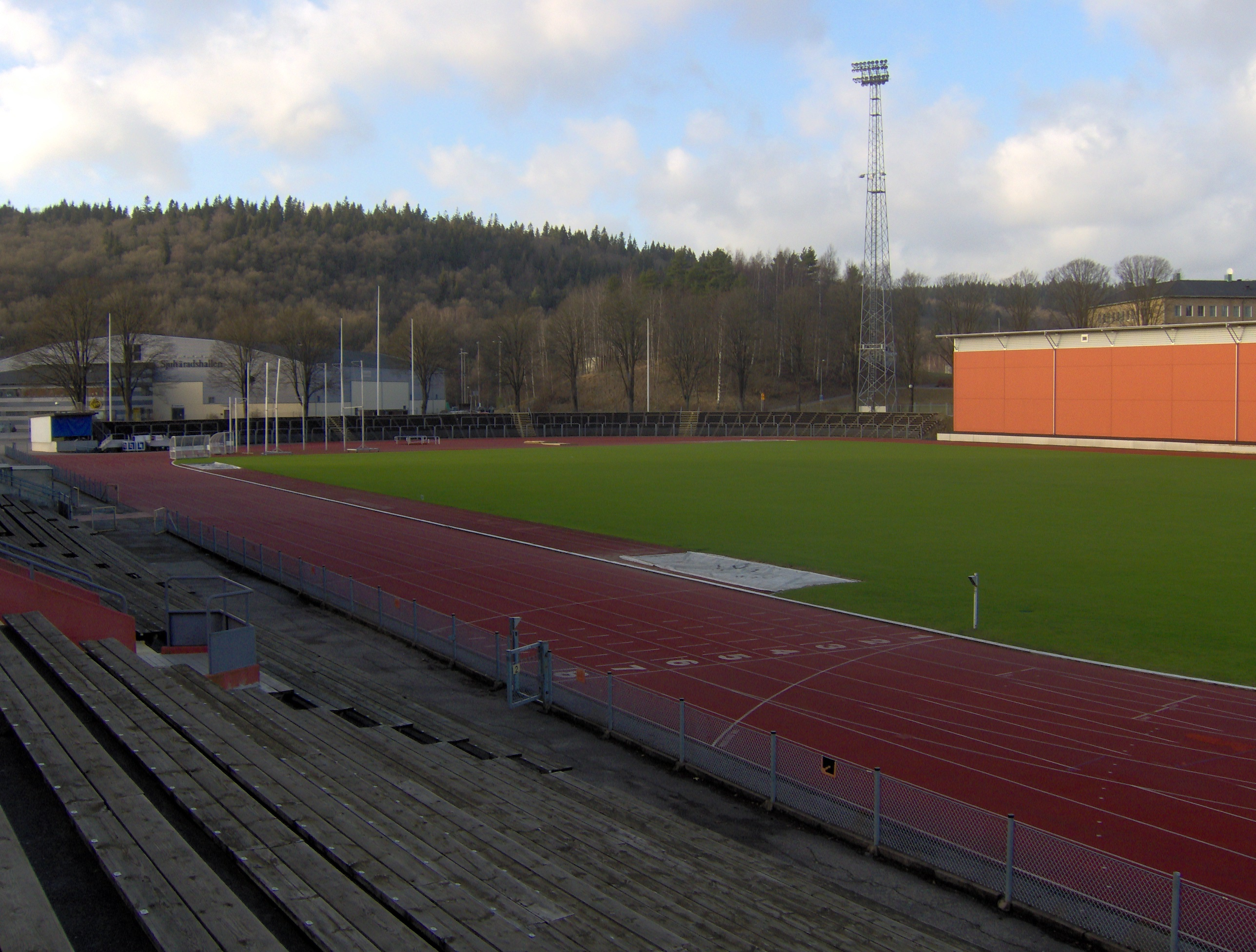

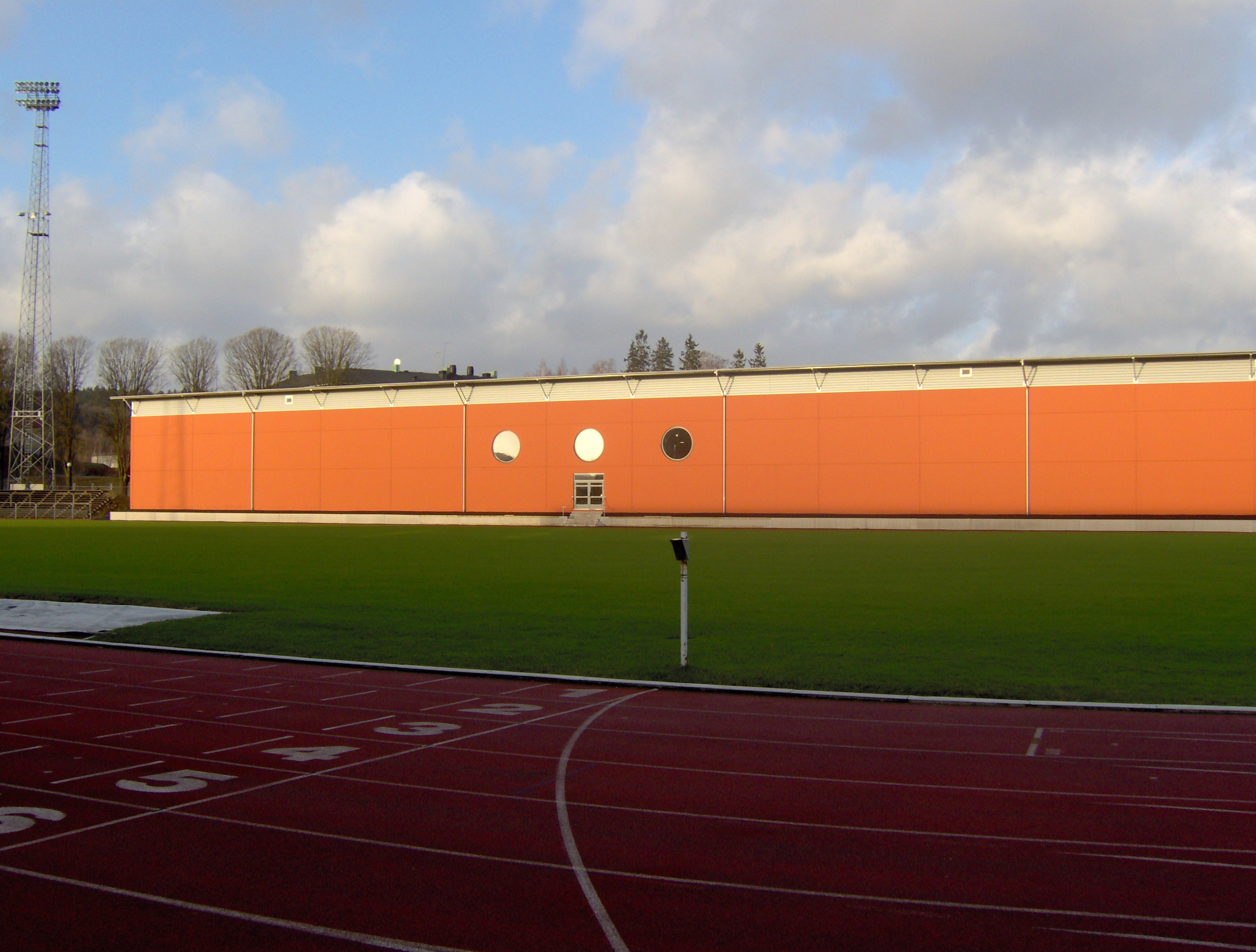

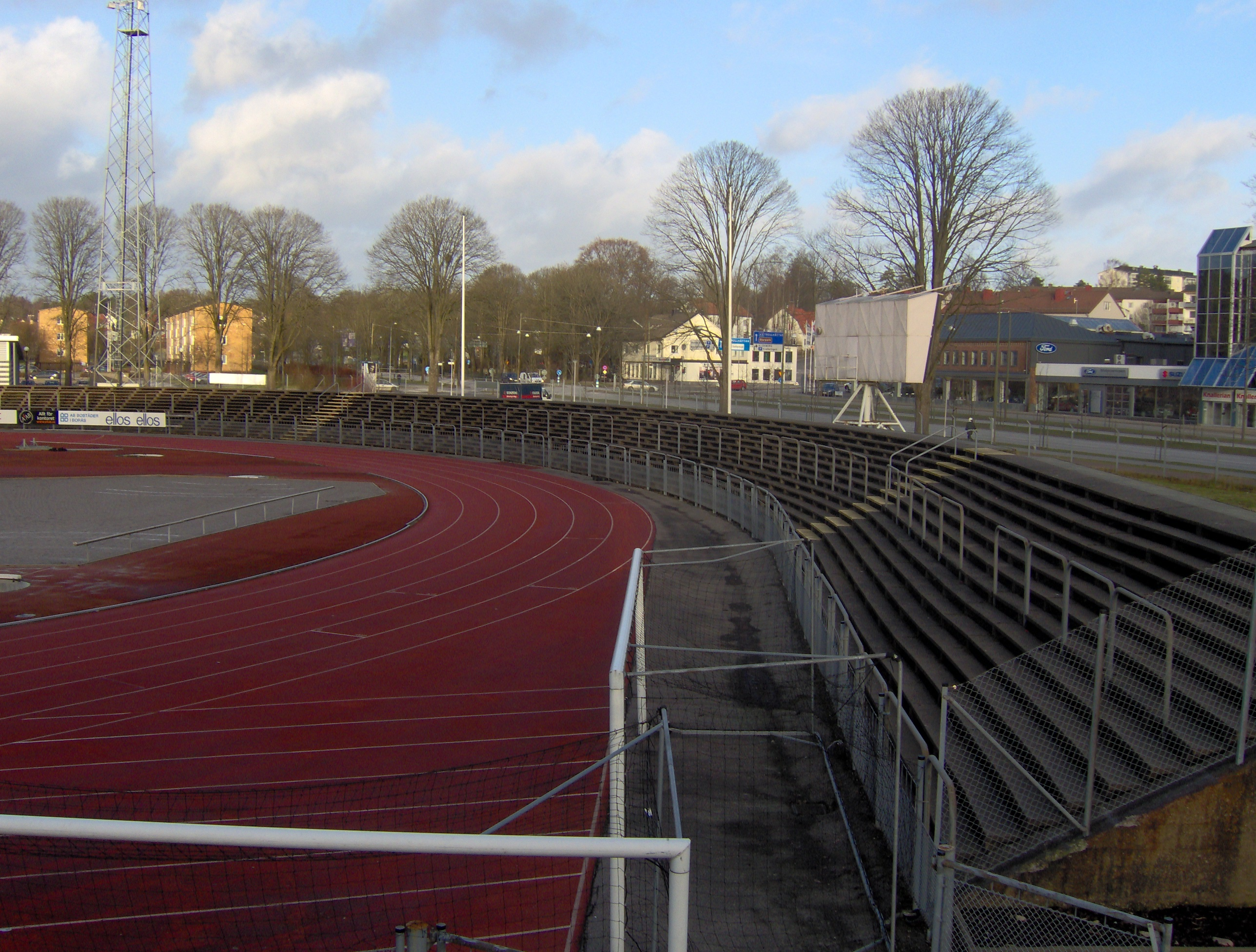

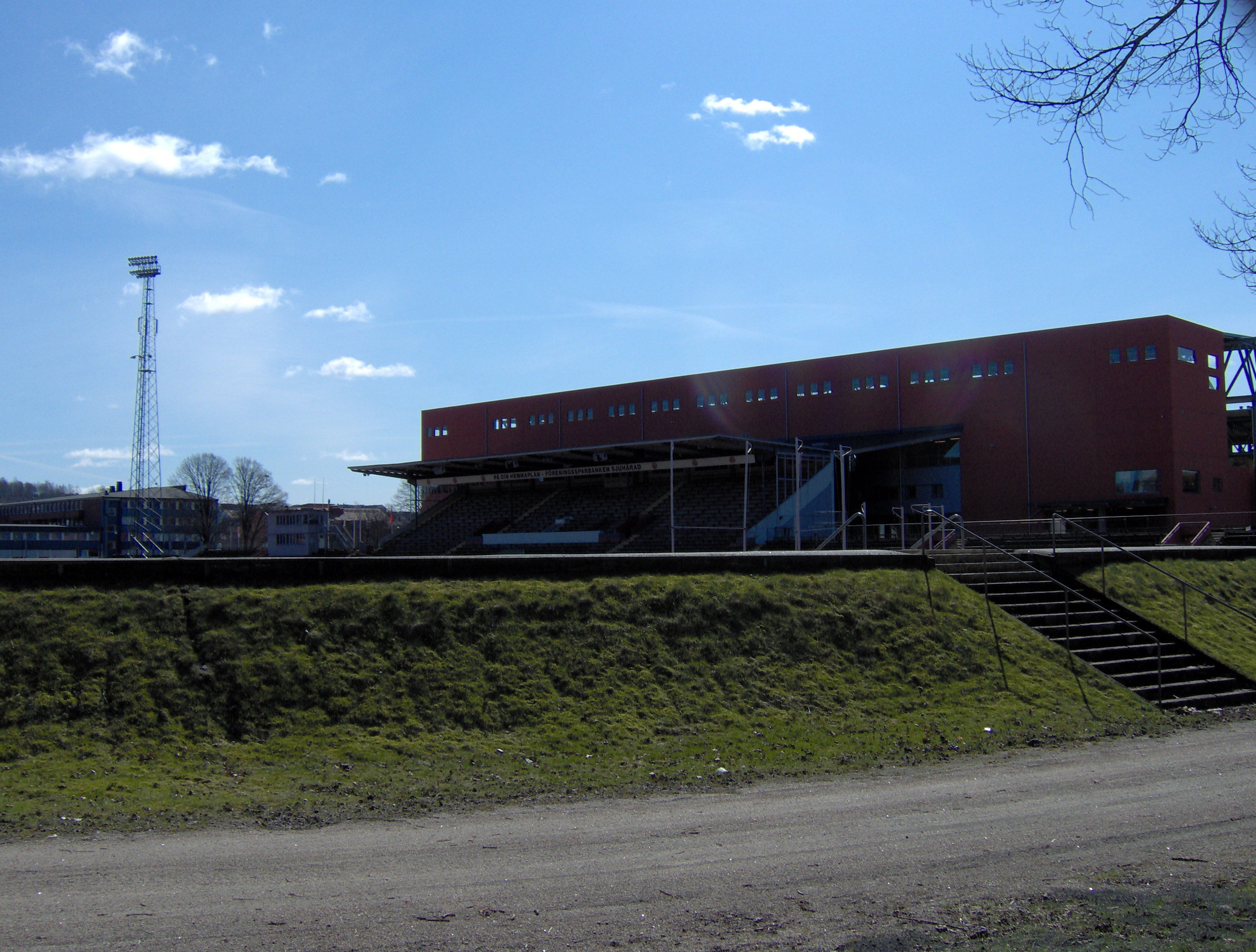

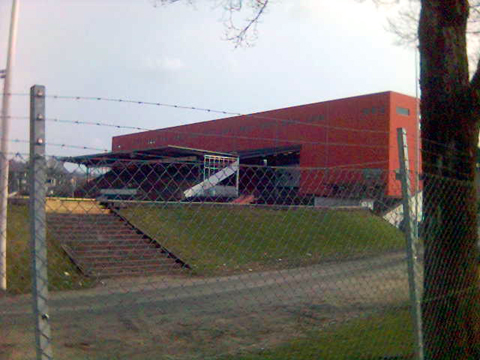
