= Ramnavallen =

Football stadium in Borås, Sweden

Coordinates: 57°43′21″N 12°55′09″E

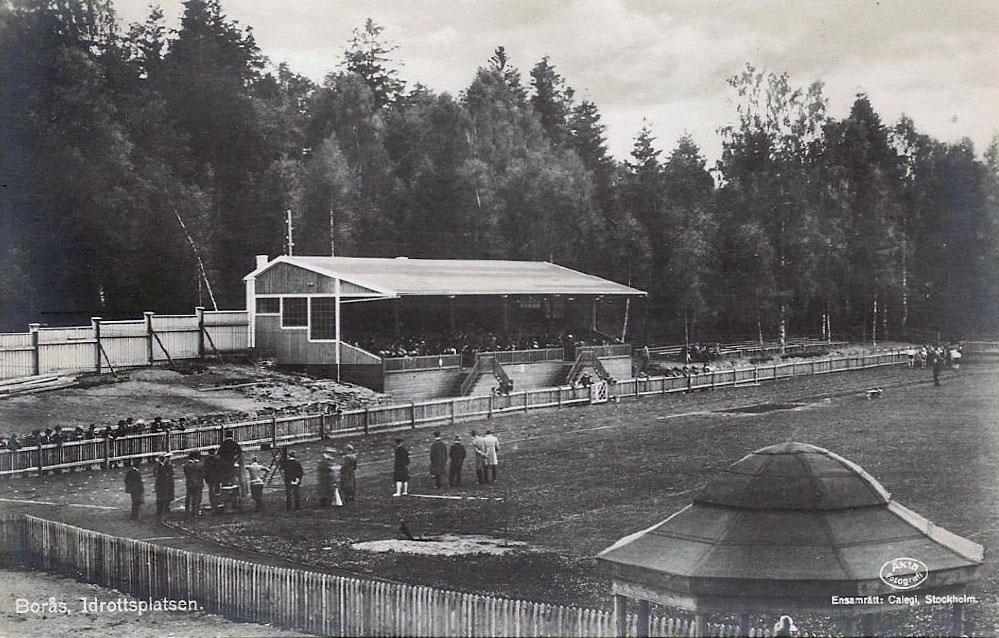
Ramnavallen in 1920, called Borås Idrottsplats in that time.

Ramnavallen is a football stadium in Borås, Sweden and the former home stadium for the football teams IF Elfsborg and Norrby IF. Ramnavallen has a total capacity of 4,000 spectators.
