= Thomas Ahlström =

Swedish footballer

Personal information
- Date of birth: 17 July 1952 (age 74)
- Place of birth: Sweden
- Position: Midfielder

Senior career*
Years	Team	Apps	(Gls)
1970–1979	Elfsborg	176	(53)
1979–1982	Olympiacos	45	(11)
1982–1984	Elfsborg	64	(29)
Total		285	(93)

International career
1973–1982	Sweden	11	(2)
- * Club domestic league appearances and goals

Thomas Ahlström (17 July 1952) is a Swedish former professional footballer who played as a midfielder.

Thomas played for IF Elfsborg between 1971–1979 and 1982–84 and was the top scorer in Allsvenskan year 1983 with 16 goals. In 1979-82 he played in Olympiacos F.C., Greece. Thomas Ahlström was a member of the Swedish squad in the 1974 FIFA World Cup in Germany. He primarily was a midfielder, but could also play as a forward.
