= IF Elfsborg =

Elfsborg
- Full name: Idrottsföreningen Elfsborg
- Nicknames: Di Gule (The Yellow Ones); Eleganterna (The Elegants)
- Founded: 26 June 1904; 122 years ago (as Borås Fotbollslag)
- Ground: Borås Arena, Borås
- Capacity: 14,500
- Chairman: Sune Lundqvist
- Manager: Björn Hamberg
- League: Allsvenskan
- 2025: Allsvenskan, 8th of 16
- Website: www.elfsborg.se
Home colours	Away colours	Third colours

Idrottsföreningen Elfsborg, more commonly known as IF Elfsborg or simply Elfsborg (Swedish pronunciation: [ˈɛ̌lfsbɔrj]), is a professional football club based in Borås, Sweden, and is affiliated to the Västergötlands Fotbollförbund. They play in the Allsvenskan and have spent most of their history in the top tier of Swedish football. Their homeground is Borås Arena, where they have played since 17 April 2005.

The club was founded in 1904 by a group of 19 youngsters which all were 14–15 years old. Borås Fotbollslag was formed in Ordenshuset at Landala (today Knalleland) on 26 June 1904. The main protagonist in the formation, Carl Larson, who in addition to football also practiced athletics and wrestling, claimed the reason was that the main sports club in the city, Borås Athletic and Sports Society, would not exert football in their program.

Carl Larson, however, found that there were too many clubs containing the city name Borås which contributed to the name change in 1906 by Riksidrottsförbundet to the current, IF Elfsborg. The name is derived from Älvsborg County where instead of making use of the modern spelling Älvsborg, they used the older spelling with an E. The same goes for the club colours, reflected in their crest and kit, yellow and black. Colours that are taken from Älvsborg Regiment, Elfsborg would not only represent a city but a whole region. A recurring motto of the club is "Vi Tillsammans" (We together).

The club's homeground Borås Arena is also called Elfsborg Fortress, since Elfsborg is Allsvenskan home strongest team in the 2000s (decade). It is one of two teams in Allsvenskan that has won against the Sweden national team with 2–1 in the opening ceremony of Ryavallen (the other team is AIK 1979 with 3–2) and one of only two teams to win Allsvenskan as newcomers in 1961, the other team was Östers IF in 1968. Elfsborg have repeatedly participated for the qualifier to Champions League, Europa League and was as late as 2007 in 2007–08 UEFA Cup and was one of the co-winners in 2008 UEFA Intertoto Cup the following year. The club have won six national championships, the latest in 2012, and three national cups.

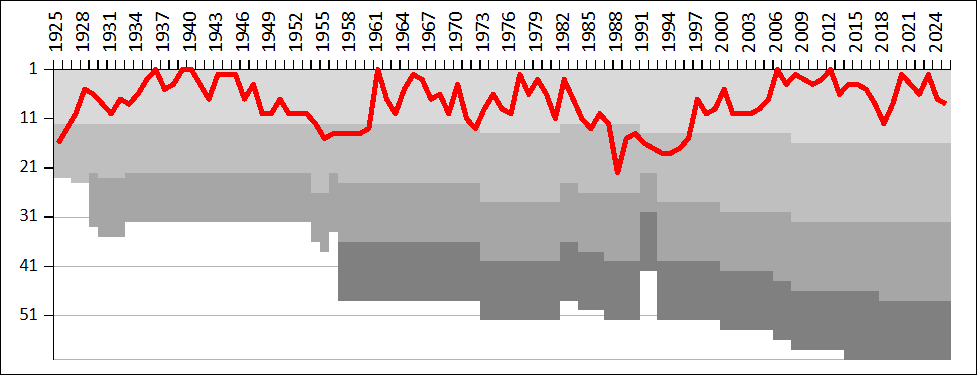
A chart showing the progress of IF Elfsborg through the Swedish football league system. The different shades of gray represent league divisions.

== History ==
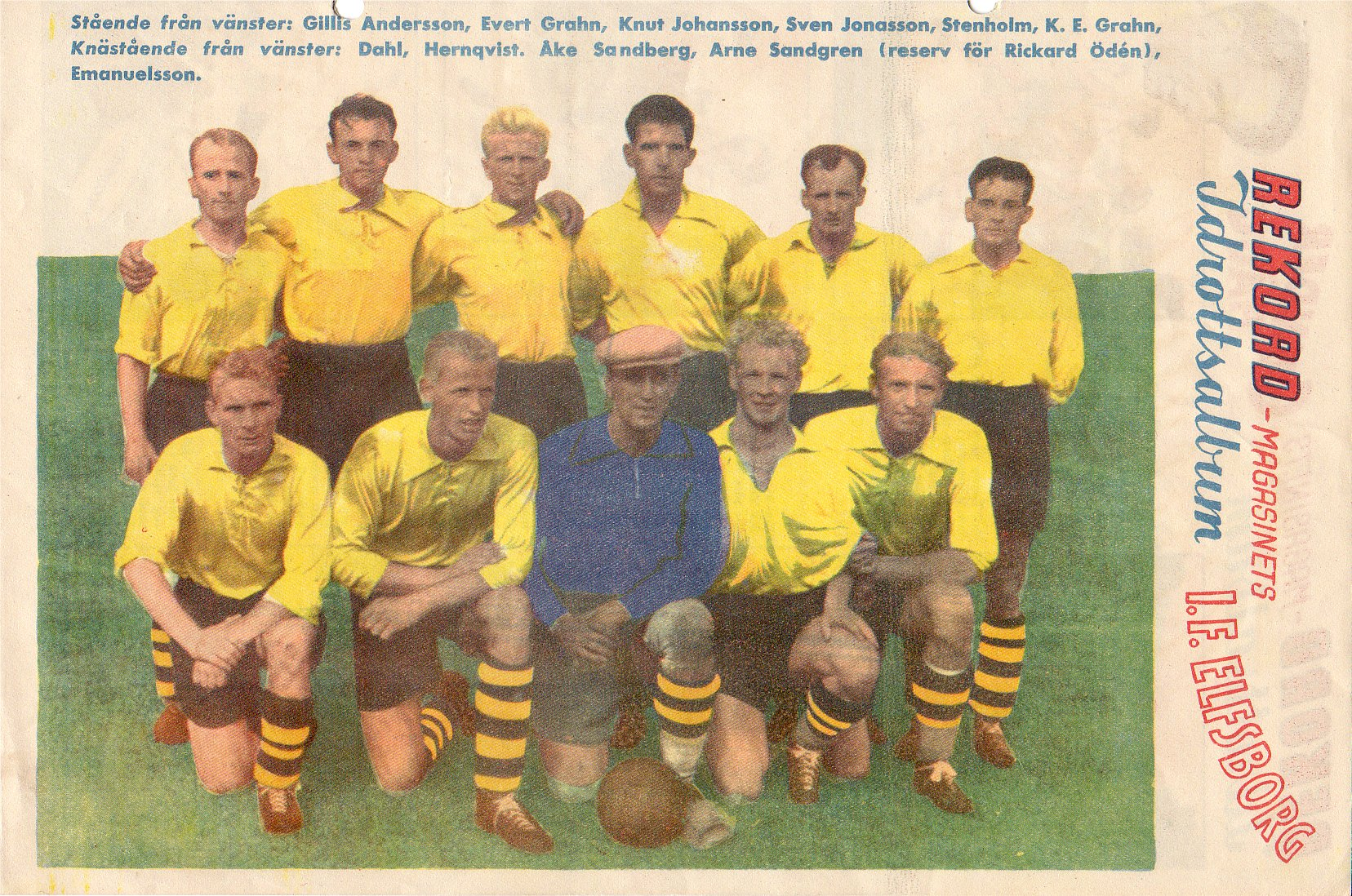
The glory days of IF Elfsborg, season 1942–43, with the team whom won three national titles. Standing from left: Gillis Andersson, Evert Grahn, Knut Johansson, Sven Jonasson, Stenholm, KE Grahn. Kneeling from left: Dahl, Hernqvist, Åke Sandberg, Arne Sandgren, Emanuelsson.

Borås Fotbollslag was formed on 26 June 1904, by a group of youngsters. In 1906 the name was changed to IF Elfsborg, because the founders felt there were too many teams with 'Borås' in their name. In 1926 Elfsborg won Västsvenska Serien, and defeated Halmstad BK in the play-off, and was promoted to Allsvenskan for the first time. During the 1930s Elfsborg built a very strong team led by striker Sven Jonasson, who appeared in both the 1934 and 1938 World Cup. In 1936 Elfsborg won Allsvenskan for the first time, and two more titles followed soon after (1939 and 1940). During this period Elfsborg had as many as seven players in the Sweden national team.

The club also fielded a bandy team for decades. In 1920, 1924, 1927, 1932, 1934, and 1938, IF Elfsborg won the Västergötland bandy district championship.

In 1941 Elfsborg left Ramnavallen to play their home games at the newly constructed Ryavallen. The first game at the new ground was supposed to be a friendly between Sweden and Finland, but Finland's involvement in the Second World War prevented them from playing, so they were replaced by Elfsborg, who beat Sweden 2–1.

In the mid-1940s Elfsborg came close to claiming Allsvenskan again, but finished second three consecutive seasons. By the late 1940s, Elfsborg's glory days were sparse, and the club would relegated in 1954.

In 1960 Elfsborg won promotion after an impressive season with 20 wins in 22 games, and the club won Allsvenskan for the fourth time in 1961, becoming the first Swedish team to go straight from the second level to becoming champions. This was under the leadership of the legendary Sven Andreasson as chairman.

In 1977 Elfsborg reached second place, but the following years proved difficult for the club. In 1987 Elfsborg finished last in Allsvenskan, and did not return to the top flight until 1997. The team that won promotion contained several future Swedish internationals including Anders Svensson and Tobias Linderoth. Even though Elfsborg won their first two cup titles (in 2001 and 2003), the club struggled to stay in Allsvenskan in the following years.

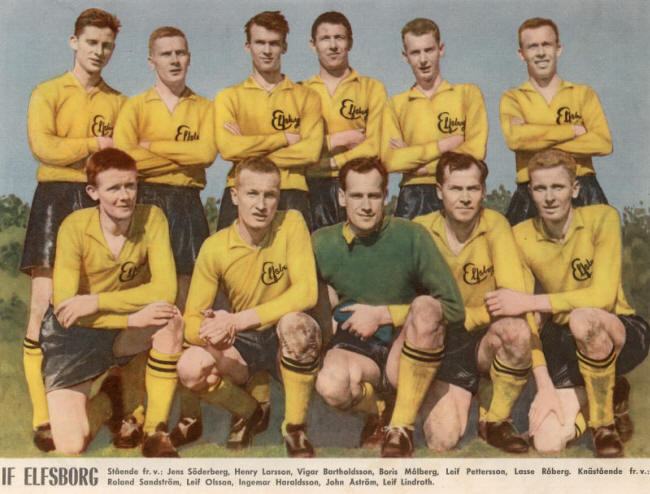
Elfsborg squad who won the national championship 1961.

In 2005 Elfsborg spent a lot of money on building Borås Arena, and bringing back former players. The investments paid off and the fifth Championship was won in 2006 – the club's first Allsvenskan title for 41 years. The year after Elfsborg appeared in the Champions League qualifying stage for the first time, and subsequently reached the group stage in the UEFA Cup for the first time. On the way there they knocked out Linfield FC (Northern Ireland) and Debreceni VSC (Hungary) in the qualification stage of the Champions League before eventually being eliminated themselves by the hands of Valencia CF (Spain) in the last round. The club won the last round of qualifications for the Uefa Cup against FC Dinamo București (Romania).

In the group stage IF Elfsborg faced AC Fiorentina and Villarreal away and AEK Athens and FK Mladá Boleslav at Borås Arena and was knocked out.

In the following years, IF Elfsborg under the guidance of coach Magnus Haglund and his 4-2-3-1-formation have established themselves as a top club in Swedish football. The clearly stated ambition to finish top 4, qualifying for European football every year. In 2007, the club finished 4th securing a place in the last edition of the Intertoto-cup, from which they advanced but was surprisingly knocked out by St Patrick's Athletic F.C. in the second qualifying round of the UEFA Cup after conceding late goals in both legs.

The team bounced back though, competing for the title again until the very last round of 2008. In the end, injuries to key players like Anders Svensson and Stefan Ishizaki proved to costly, eventually having to settle for second place behind Kalmar FF.

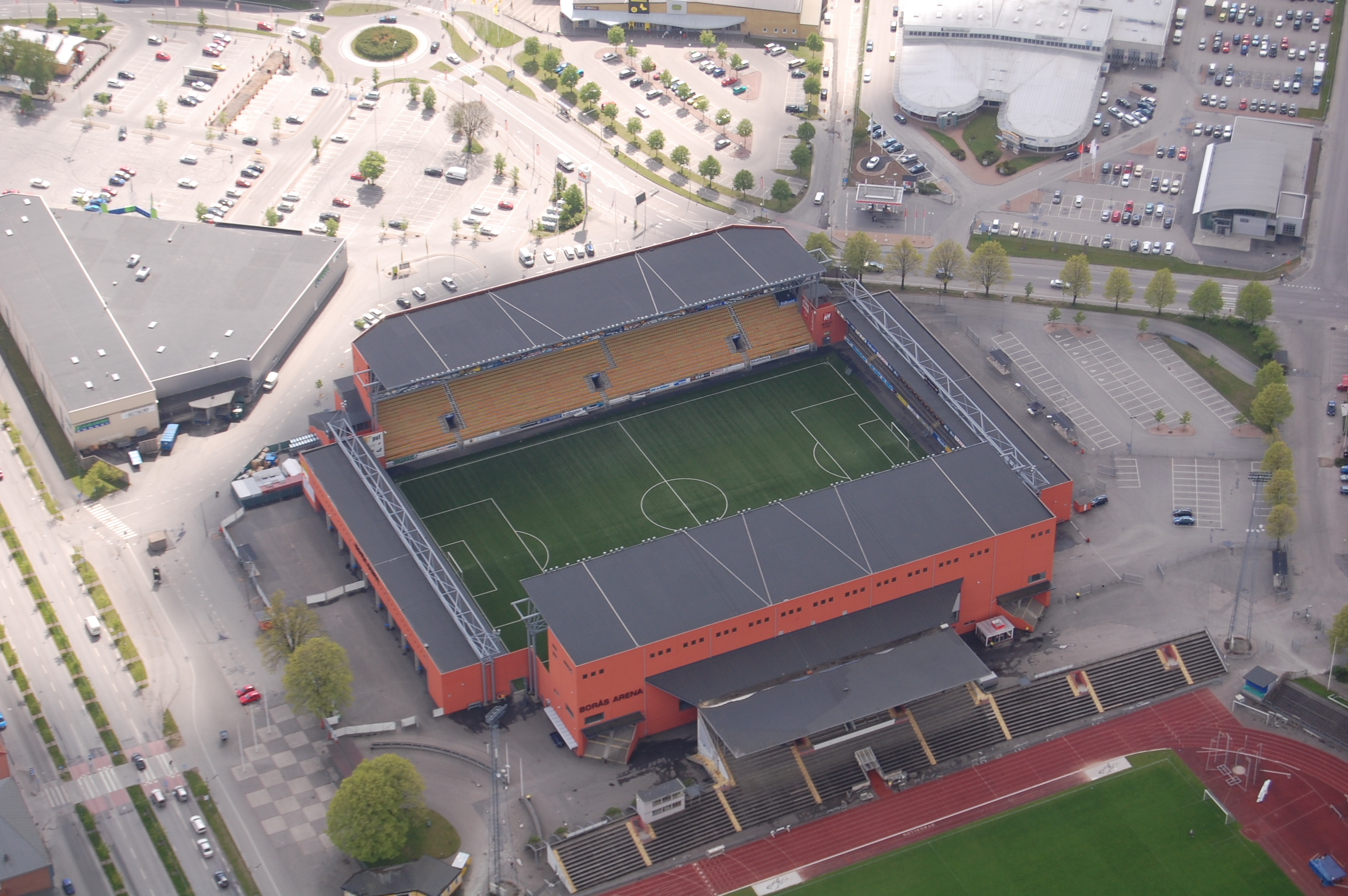
Borås Arena opened a new era for Elfsborg.

The following year, IF Elfsborg once again challenged for a place in European football, brushing aside Hungarian side Szombathelyi Haladás and Portuguese S.C. Braga before eventually falling in the last qualifying round against S.S. Lazio.

IF Elfsborg were big favourites for winning the 2009 but had a problem capitalizing on their high possession and serendipity and eventually ranking third behind AIK and rivals IFK Göteborg.

The following season expectations remained high, but a mediocre start (only nine points in the first 9 rounds), the IF Elfsborg 2010 campaign became an uphill struggle, and Helsingborgs IF and Malmö FF were uncatchable. Malmö FF would be champions with IF Elfsborg in fourth place.

2010 marked IF Elfsborg's fourth consecutive season in continental football. The team entered the Europa League second qualifying round in the seeded pot having no real difficulties eliminating Moldovan side FC Iskra-Stal (on an aggregate score of 3–1). The Macedonian side FK Teteks proved unchallenging in the following round with IF Elfsborg realising an emphatic 5–0 first leg win.

The team seemed in good shape to make a serious challenge for reaching the Europa League group stage even though they would be unseeded in the last qualifying round. Unfortunately the draw was once again one of the worst realised. SSC Napoli was held to a 1–0 win away at Stadio San Paolo following a stellar effort by new Danish signing Jesper Christiansen, but the Italians proved too strong in the second leg where they cruised to a 2–0 victory, both goals scored by Uruguay international Edinson Cavani.

The 2010 season was busy for transfers, both in and out. Sweden international Emir Bajrami making his way to FC Twente during the summer and top goalscorer Denni Avdic moving to Werder Bremen during the January transfer window. Three players were signed from Danish clubs. Former hero Jon Jönsson was brought in from Brøndby IF during the summer to bolster the defense, goalkeeper Jesper Christiansen from FC København and right back Andreas Klarström from Esbjerg fB making a comeback to the club.

The club signings during the 2010–2011 winter were notable. Brought in were: forward Lasse Nilsson from Vitesse Arnhem, central defender Andreas Augustsson from Randers FC and target man David Elm from Fulham F.C. Once again, many of the media pundits were thinking that IF Elfsborg were firm favourites to win the 2011.

In early spring former allsvenskan top goalscorer Fredrik Berglund decided to hang up his boots.

The 2011 campaign showed an IF Elfsborg seemingly set on playing a more successful straightforward counter-attacking game. The team started bringing home the occasional away wins. By season's midpoint the team was trailing Helsingborgs IF at the top of the table. Young left winger Niklas Hult was the standout player during that half of the season, quickly establishing himself in the team and being touted by some members of the press as "the new Freddie Ljungberg".

In continental football, IF Elfsborg entered the fray in the first qualifying round of the Europa League. CS Fola Esch were brushed aside after winning 4–0 in the first leg at home and drawing (1–1) away.

== Colours and crest ==
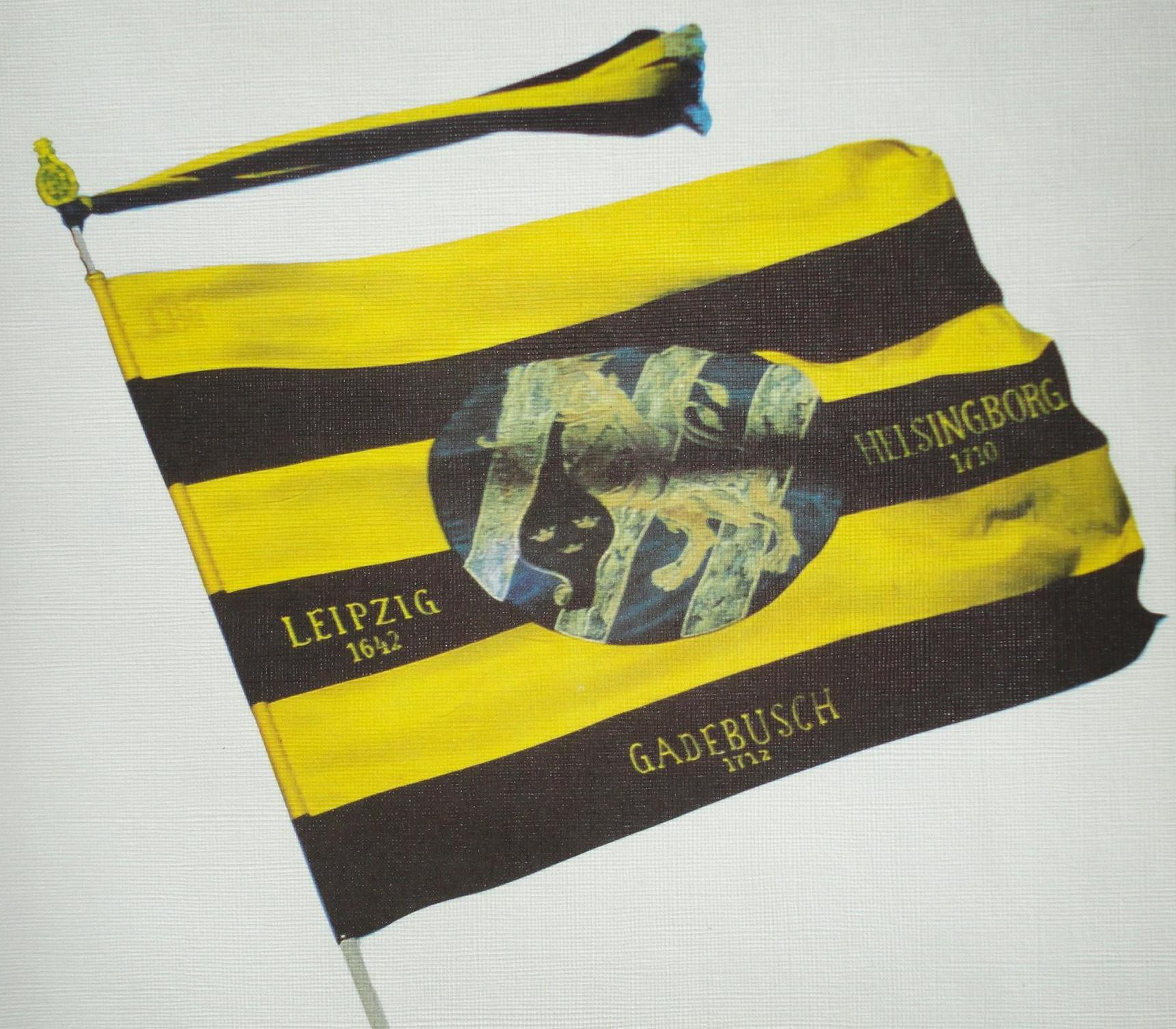
The colors yellow and black in Elfsborg derived from the Royal Älvsborg Regiment.

Ever since Elfsborg was established they wore the main colour yellow with some stripes of black. The yellow and black color originates in Älvsborg, and it was Älvsborg Regiment that had yellow and black color on their flag, which meant that Elfsborg of course would play in these colors. So it became yellow shirts and black shorts. The costumes remained pure in the colors yellow and black with no club text scrolling on the chest or back. They were simply pure in their colors, and it remained so until the 1940s when trends over Sweden was to adorn their badge on the shirt. In this manner, they could strengthen their brand even more. For Elfsborgs part it was the classic black text Elfsborg in italics placed on the chest at the heart. From 1940 until 2007, almost 50 years, the classic text Elfsborg decorated chest. From 2007 there was a change to what is now the official club emblem there, an emblem derived from the 1970s and has appeared in several versions at most of Elfsborg sections. It is a crown of yellow and black with Elfsborg engraved in it and a football at the top. The reason for the change was mainly to promote the club brand. They wanted a brand that people and companies could associate themselves with – instead of a text as before.

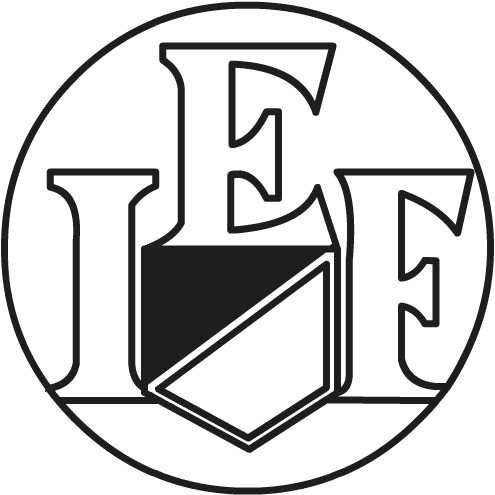
Old crest used before the 1970s.

Elfsborg reserve kit is red, and become so as a tribute to a 1941 match against the Sweden. The match was intended a celebration to the Elfsborg new arena Ryavallen. But Second World War deprivation left Elfsborg with a choice of kit the same color, yellow, as their opponent. On short notice, a kit was borrowed from Borås Wäferi, red and white. The Elfsbor 2-1 win would be memorialized in the red kit. Sweden played in yellow. The colours red and white figure prominently as symbols of the city of Borås, in the coat of arms with the two scissors. Elfsborg has the distinction of being the only team in Allsvenskan's history to ever defeat Sweden.

=== Sponsorship ===
The shirts remained long without a major sponsor, which would obviously affect the economy. When IFE harrowed in Division 1 South in the early 1990s, Olle Blomqvist CEO of Ellos went in with large sums of money and saved the association by becoming the major sponsor. This was not necessarily because he is particularly interested in football, but because he knew the importance Elfsborg had to Borås and Sjuhärad. Ellos became such a prominent sponsor that people jokingly began to Christen the team "Ellos" due to its presence on their shirts. In 2010, a survey showed that Elfsborg was second best team in Allsvenskan to acquire sponsorship money and to establish and maintain contact with their sponsor. The same year, Elfsborg broke a record in local sponsorships around Sjuhärad when its sponsor money increased from 28 to 33 million SEK.

It was not until recently that they signed a contract with major sportbrands. Elfsborg have significantly signed a contract with Umbro up to this date to use their collection of both soccer shoes and clothes. So strong was Umbro's sponsorship, that a section of Borås Arena became "umbrocorner". In earlier years, teams always sewed their own shirts, but with a contract from a major label, new shirts get released into the market each year– which is an economical advantage.

== Stadia ==
=== Ramnavallen ===
One of the first homegrounds to Elfsborg was a small pitch of grass in Folkparken (Ramnaparken today). However Elfsborg noticed quickly that it required more space to be on, both for training and matches. They went to Fristad and Fristads hed where they practiced and played, due to the more space. Next ground that was in Borås was Apotekarnas Mosse who would later become today's Ramnavallen.

Ramnavallen was completed in 1922 and then got Elfsborg finally run out on his long-awaited stadium, Ramnavallen. At its time, this was a very modern stadium even though it initially took only 2.700 spectators. Borås Tidning was lyrical about the contribution and described the stadium as impressive from the provincial point of view and because it had high international standards. Elfsborg first Allsvenskan league match on Ramnavallen was played in 1926 and guests were Örgryte IS. 3887 spectators came and saw Evert Lundqvist make the only goal for the guests. The next season became the first yellow and black premiere triumph on the new stadium. AIK came to Ramnavallen and were defeated with 2–1.

Elfsborg kept ramnavallen as a homeground until 1941 and during this time won three league titles. Attendance record of ramnavallen was against AIK 7 June 1936, the end game before the league gold, 16.348 spectators came to see Elfsborg win their first league title in history.

=== Ryavallen ===
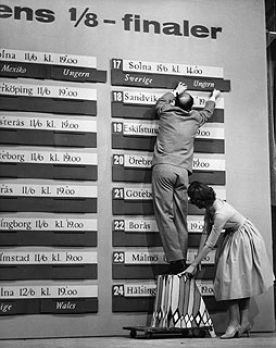
Play order for the FIFA World Cup 1958, Borås and Ryavallen are number 22.

Ryavallen was completed in 1941 and became first of all the new homeground of IF Elfsborg. But it was also Borås first major sports stadium, where the usual track and field could be exercised. Hence the athletics track along the pitch. Before one grandstand was demolished in 2005 the capacity was 19.400, to today's approximately 7,000. The old Ryavallen in Borås will get a facelift in 2012. Prior to Swedish Athletics Championship 2013, the current six running tracks widened to eight, and both seat grandstand and the earthworks plan is stripped to make room. The old legendary dikes on Ryavallen gets a proper scratch when Ryavallen upgraded for 13 million SEK. After the renovation, Ryavallen will not be approved to play football on by Swedish Football Association nor UEFA, it will in the future only be used for the purpose of athletics.

At one point came ryavallen to be used for a championship. During the 1958 FIFA World Cup, it hosted the matches between USSR and Austria, and between England and Austria. The Soviet Union won their match against Austria with 2–0, and England had a draw against Austria, 2–2. A championship where Sweden came as a surprise to the finals where they faced Brazil. It ended with a 5–2 loss, but an honorable second place which is the best Sweden performed in a World Cup.

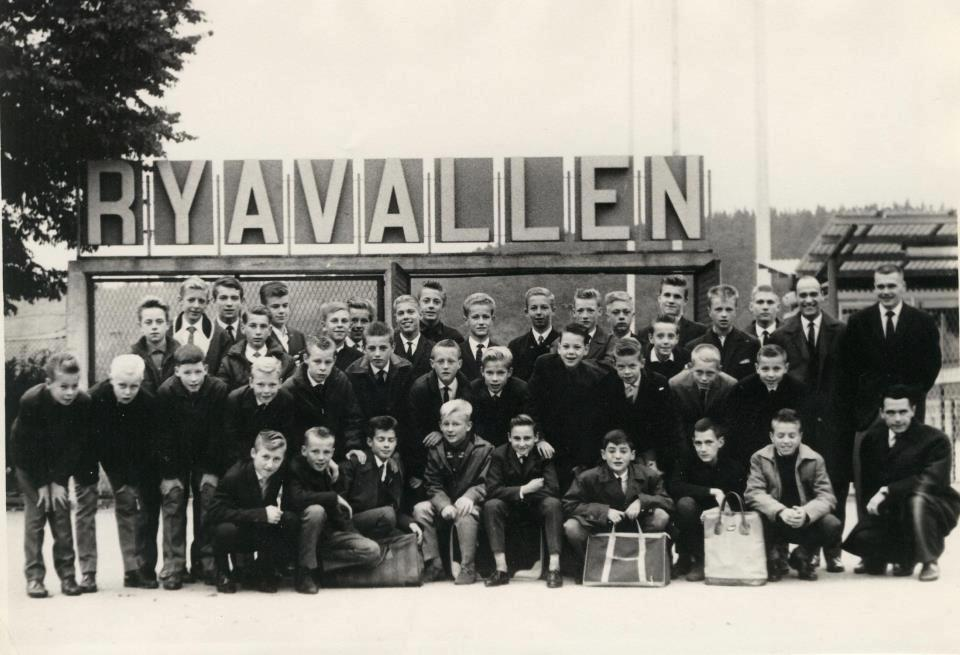
Youth team of IF Elfsborg, standing in front of Ryavallen during early 60s.

The most memorable event in Ryavallen was the gold game against Örgryte IS – 1961. Elfsborg faced Örgryte on Ryavallen and plays 1–1. When the final whistle sounded, it was clear that Elfsborg as first team come up from Division 2 and immediately won Allsvenskan gold. This made them historic. This was the fourth league gold for Elfsborg. Another very memorable moment of the more terrible degree was when the grandstand collapsed against IFK Göteborg – 1979. The reason was because of the high spectator pressure (19,170) the grandstand collapsed and 10 people had to get to hospital. A memorable moment of the weirder degree was an own goal by Husqvarna IF in the final minutes – 1958. Elfsborg played against Husqvarna IF and it is 0–1 with ten minutes left. A Husqvarna player receives the ball just outside his own penalty area. He then shoots, hard and accurate an untakeable shot into his own goal. No one understands why, and the match ends 1–1. In the newspaper the day after he explains that he was so tired that he did not know which side of the pitch he had found himself.

25 October 2004 would be a historic game before kickoff. Elfsborg met Hammarby and that was the last game ever at Ryavallen. The arena had become too old after 63 years of service. In 2005 Elfsborg moved to its new modern arena, Borås Arena, and ryavallen was converted completely to only fit for athletics. Even so, did Ryavallen reach the highest attendance record in history of Elfsborg, IF Elfsborg – IFK Norrköping – 1961. Record Audience 21,854 in this historic match. Elfsborg won the match with 3–0. After Ryavallen inaugurated in 1941 by Crown Prince Gustav Adolf V and Elfsborg struck as the only Allsvenskan team in the history Sweden men's national football team in the inaugural match by 2–1. That also completed a 63-year history in the last match against Hammarby with a win.

=== Borås Arena ===
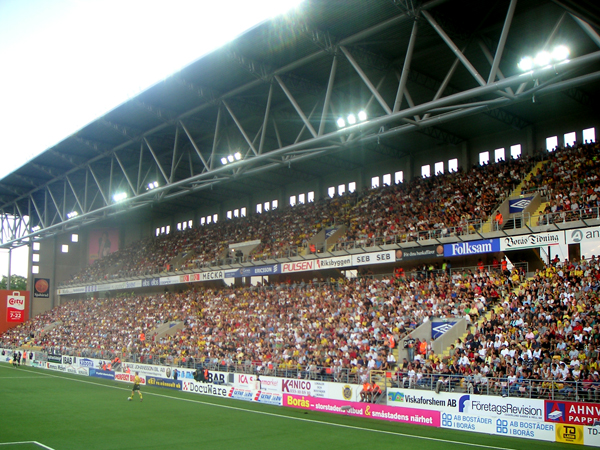
Ålgårdsläktaren, in a derby against IFK Göteborg.

Borås Arena is a football stadium in Borås, Sweden. It is the home ground of IF Elfsborg and Norrby IF and was opened on 17 April 2005. Borås Arena has an artificial turf pitch, and was changed to the most modern synthetic turf on the market during the UEFA Euro 2012 at a cost of £500 000. The capacity of the arena is 14,500–17,800 depending on usage, 14,800 is mostly the capacity during international matches, because Uefa would not approve the installation of seats on the standing because of fire risk which means a lower capacity is needed to be approved by Uefa. Borås Arena is located next to Elfsborgs old homeground Ryavallen, both of the stadiums are built together at the roofs, which means that the new stadium is still attached to the old historical Ryavallen.

The first construction started on 31 December 2003 and was inaugurated 17 April 2005 at a cost of £1,120 000 . Which was very cheap at this time considering to be Sweden's most modern stadium at that time. It was an effort by Borås Municipality that went out as a lender to Elfsborg. A necessary investment for the club and the city, Elfsborg would own their own stadium by the company Borås Arena AB and would receive all revenues without any intermediaries from matches. Borås Arena didn't only open a new era for IF Elfsborg but also for other clubs in Allsvenskan, Elfsborg was the first club to build a new arena owned by their own investment company. Many other clubs have built new arenas copying the model Elfsborg set up, trying to own their arena which gives big economic resources. Borås Arena consists of four main grandstands; Knallelandsläktaren, Ålgårdsläktaren, Sjuhäradsläktaren and Elfsborgsläktaren.

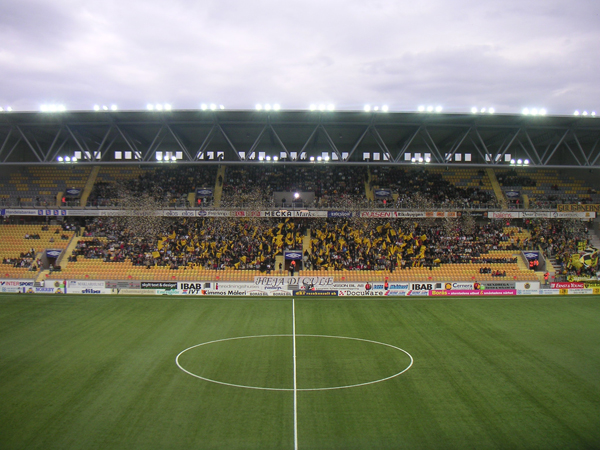
Ålgårdsläktaren, in a Tifo arrangement.

The first game at Borås Arena was between IF Elfsborg vs Örgryte IS on 17 April 2005 in the top Swedish league, Allsvenskan. The game ended in a 1–0 victory for Elfsborg, Daniel Mobaeck scoring the only and first goal in history on Borås Arena. The current record attendance is 17,070 and was set 4 July 2005 in a game between IF Elfsborg and Kalmar FF which marked the return of both Anders Svensson and Mathias Svensson. Anders Svensson also became the first on Borås Arena to score a hat-trick in the derby against rivals IFK Göteborg, Elfsborg won with Anders 3 goals, 3–1. The highest attendance on an international tournament was during the Champions League play-off against Valencia CF where 13,148 spectators came to see Elfsborg deal with the Spaniards. Elfsborg lost with 2–1, after a goal by Daniel Alexandersson.

The stadium was originally scheduled to be a tournament site for the 2009 UEFA European Under-21 Football Championship, but a sponsorship conflict with Max fast food chain's location at the stadium and official UEFA sponsor McDonald's, plus a contractual requirement for official sponsors to have a monopoly over the stadium's area, and a refusal to close the restaurant led to it losing its status as a site for the tournament. A strange conflict that led to Elfsborg and Borås Arena lost the championship as an arranger.

2006 was an important moment in Borås Arenas's history. In this year Elfsborg received dividends on their effort by salvaging the club's 5th SM-Gold. An explicit goal from the club was to win SM-Gold by 2007 and this was accomplished a year in advance, 5 November 2006. The association was strengthened at all levels for a couple of years, not least organizationally and financially, with new sports director "Mr. Elfsborg" Stefan Andreasson, President-elect Bosse "Bank" Johansson and two billionaires as external funders. The new manager couple Magnus Haglund and Peter Wettergren, who was employed before the 2004 season, was also in the club's big bet. The following year (2005) "Elfsborg Fortress", Borås Arena was also completed. Memorable matches this season on Borås Arena was at home the victory against Malmö FF (4–2), which many described as the best in the season and where Anders Svensson made the team's single best effort during the season. Another memorable match was the last one. Gold match at a packed Borås Arena against Djurgårdens IF where Joakim Sjöhage became gold shooter with the only goal which meant that over 40 years of waiting was over for the Elfsborgs fans.

== Supporters ==
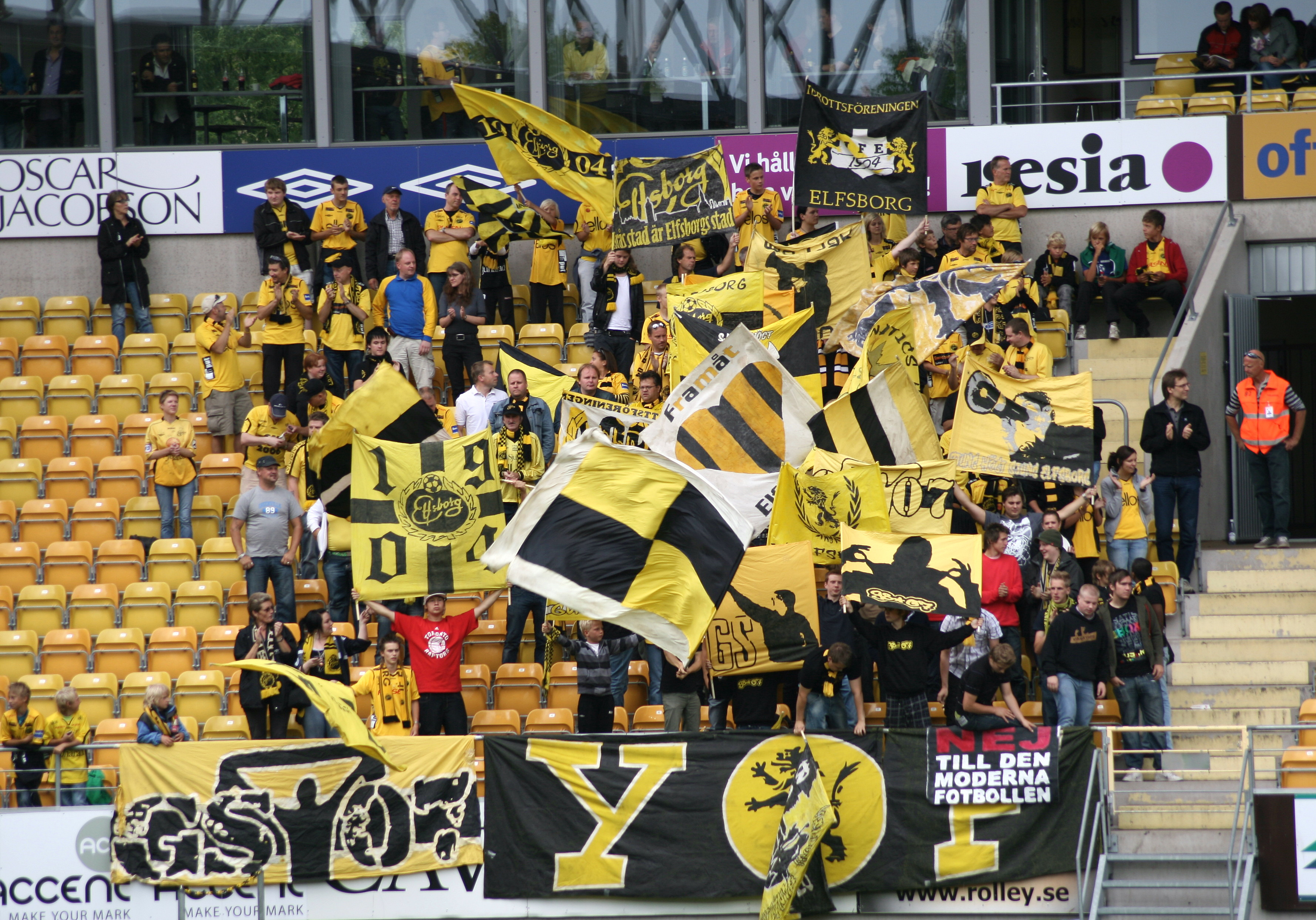
Guliganerna during a game against FK Riga.

Already in the 1940s there was the legendary Elfsborg chant "heja di våra, inte di dära, trampa di främmatta pöjka på tära" on Ryavallen, at the time, including of a certain young Ingvar Carlsson, who later became prime minister. For a few years in the 1970s "Di Gule" played fantastic football and was in top contest of the Swedish Allsvenskan. At this time the British supporter culture retrieved from "Tipsextra" began to interfere and influence in Swedish football culture, with an impact even on Ryavallen in Borås, where the seating stand for many years was the busiest around Ryavallen and Elfsborg. A young supporter section was formed later on within Elfsborgs fanclub and the culture of being on the standing ground began to arise all along with the contemporary characteristic hat and striped scarf in Elfsborgs colours yellow and black. In the coming years, there was a small and disorganized supporter group who failed to make a big fuss.

=== Guliganerna ===
1991 underwent IF Elfsborg the club's probably heaviest period ever, the economy and the results weighted during the period in Söderettan. 21 November 1991, however, formed a collection of young men, a supporter compound that would become a familiar concept not only in Borås, but throughout Sweden: Guliganerna. Despite continued play in Söderettan and low public interest in all of Sweden the supporter group, Guliganerna, continued to grow. 1990s guliganer became not known for their quantity but for their faithfulness, to always be there wherever IF Elfsborg played. After the fan bus arrived late for an away game at some point in the mid-1990s, the players looked nervous on the stand and was worried that something happened, after this incident the players had the supporters promise to not be late for the games so as not to disturb the players focus.

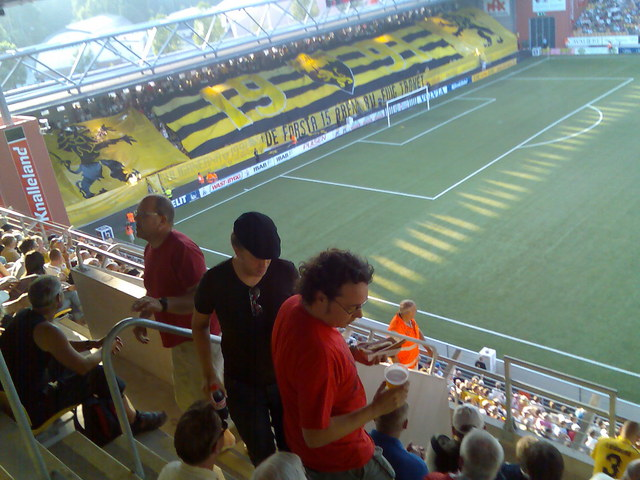
IF Elfsborg supporters Guliganerna, founded 1991, arranging a tifo.

In 1997, was IF Elfsborg back in the top tier of Swedish football and that also meant an upturn for Guliganerna, in −97 was the first Elfsborg Tifo group founded, TGD (Tifosi Guligan Divisione), who had a few tifos before the members quit for various reasons in 1999, mainly because they had no financial backing. Year 2000 became the starting year of the great generation change that occurred in Elfsborgs supporterlines until now, a group of young boys founded the current tifo group, GTS (Guligan Tifo Support), and a more youthful profile became clear among Elfsborgs supporter sections.

2006 was 45-years of waiting over. The club had won national championship which also meant an increased interest around Elfsborg. In 2011 Guliganerna had their 20th anniversary celebrated, the tribute was made in connection with the game against Kalmar FF, the players wore specially made anniversary T-shirts and GTS arranged the most expensive tifo ever in the history of the club. Guliganerna also broke during the same year, a new member record of 1155 people, making Guliganerna Sweden fifth largest fan base in the 2011.

Elfsborgs main antagonist and rivalry is pointed against IFK Göteborg and has been so since all the way back in the 1920s. The geographical position between the cities makes it Elfsborgs only and closest derby also called "El Västico", which also reflects the attendance figures since it is almost always sold out in these games.

Guliganerna and Peking Fanz (supporters of IFK Norrköping) however has a completely own history among Swedish supporters, a history that stands as a thorn in the eyes of other supporter organizations in Sweden. This friendship is based on that Guliganerna in the 1990s invited visiting supporters before the match, Peking Fanz invited back several times and the friendship was born. Since this friendship was born, both supporter bases now often follow each other's games, which makes Guliganerna and Peking Fanz unique. Especially between Elfsborgs only ultras group Yellow Fanatics, there are strong links with the IFK Norrköping, Peking ultras.

== European record ==
=== 1960–1980, playing in the UEFA Intertoto Cup and UEFA Cup ===
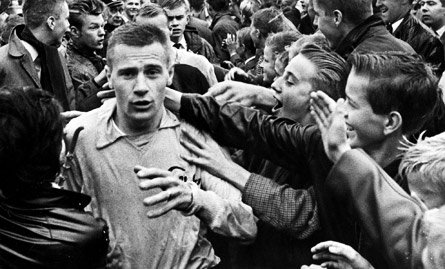
Henry Larsson scored eight goals for IF Elfsborg in their European debut in the 1961 Intertoto Cup.

Elfsborgs tenure in European football began in 1961 after winning national championship. The same year they qualified to the current UEFA Intertoto Cup. Elfsborg first resistance ever in a European Cup was against the German SC Tasmania 1900 Berlin, which they won with 2–3 away and a stunning 5–2 at home. The second match was against the classic Swiss team FC Basel, which began with a 1–2 loss at home but Elfsborg gathered forces and won in the returning game with 3–6 after a hat-trick by Henry Larsson. The last and final match was against the hard to beat Sparta Rotterdam who before they faced Elfsborg had not lost a single game, the Dutch proved to be too difficult, it ended in a 2–5 loss at home and 4–3 away loss. But despite the loss Elfsborg ended as runners-up being the second team in the group and the tournament's big winner was Henry Larsson with his 8 goals and Lars Råberg with 6 his goals. Five years later, in 1966, Elfsborg continued their adventures in Europe and the UEFA Intertoto Cup. The first opponent was the German team Borussia Neunkirchen, a match which Elfsborg won both home and away with a total of 4–1. The second match against VSS Košice became a very different story, they lost 3–0 away and then crushed the opponents with 6–0 at home, after a hat-trick by Roger Carlsson. In the final group stage match against leaders Vorwärts Berlin was lost with 2–0 in both matches which meant that Elfsborg finally ended as third in the group.

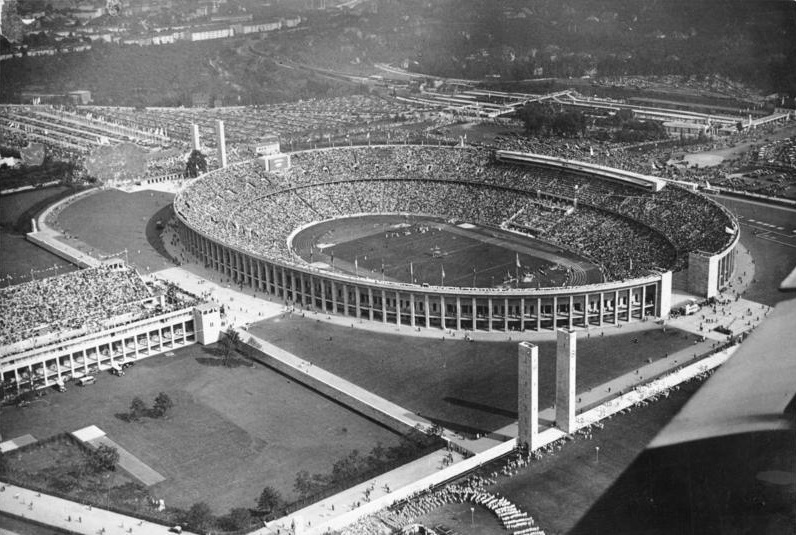
IF Elfsborg lost against Hertha Berlin in the UEFA Cup 1972, at the historic Olympic Stadium.

The following year, 1967 Elfsborg played in the UEFA Intertoto Cup where they in the first group stage match met the German team Werder Bremen. The first match ended in a 4–1 loss away, but the second game ended with a draw 2–2 at home. In the second game, the Polish team Polonia Bytom were the adversaries, where Elfsborg lost in both matches. But in the last match against the Swiss Grasshopper Club Zürich Elfsborg would take a memorable scalp, when they beat them at home with 5–2 after a hat-trick by Lars Heinemann. The return ended in a 3–1 loss and Elfsborg finished again in third place in the group. 1971 was an unsuccessful year in the European competitions for Elfsborg, they met the teams Stal Mielec, Tatran Prešov and Vejle BK. They lost every game except against the Danish Vejle BK where they won both games with a total of 8–0, and once again Elfsborg ended as third in their group. In 1972, Elfsborg played in the UEFA Cup for the first time, playing against the classic German champions Hertha Berlin in the first round. They lost with 3–1 at Olympic Stadium and with 1–4 at home.

1975 was Elfsborg's worst performing year in European competition and the UEFA Intertoto Cup when they finished last in the group after having met teams as Baník Ostrava, Celik Zenica and Vitoria Setúbal. Elfsborg still won at home against Baník Ostrava with 3–1 at home and a tie against Vitoria Setúbal. In 1978, Elfsborg participated once again in the UEFA Intertoto Cup and this year was slightly better than the last in 1975, Elfsborg won with a total of 5–3 against Norwegian Lillestrøm SK, and then a win against former Yugoslav Sloboda Tuzla. But Elfsborg could not compete with the giant Israeli Maccabi Netanya F.C., and lost the first game with 7–1 away but managed a 2–2 draw at home. In 1978 Elfsborg were in the UEFA Cup for the second time when they stood against the French sovereigns RC Strasbourg. In the first meeting, Elfsborg surprisingly won 2–0 at home, but in the returning game they lost 4–1 in front of 31 000 spectators.

=== 1980–2000, many years outside European football ===
1980, became Elfsborg best year ever in the UEFA Intertoto Cup when they won their group and became the winner of the tournament. This after they first won against FK Napredak Kruševac with a total of 4–2 and then against Slavia Sofia with a total of 3–1. German VfL Bochum became more difficult when the loss in the first meeting with 2–1 and then changed with a win at home 1–0, this meant that Elfsborg ended up as number one in their group. The following year, 1981, did Elfsborg participate in the UEFA Cup where they faced Scottish St Mirren F.C. The first match ended in a 1–2 loss at home who then followed up with a draw 0–0 in Scotland. 1983 Elfsborg would make their penultimate appearance in the UEFA Intertoto Cup, when they stood against the teams TJ Vitkovice, Trakia Plovdiv and Eintracht Braunschweig. It was a bad adventure where they only won against German Eintracht Braunschweig with 1–0 at home and play a draw against Trakia Plovdiv, this meant that Elfsborg finished as last in their group. Despite the poor performance 1983, they reached the UEFA Cup, 1984, where the opponents was Polish team Widzew Łódź, before 30 000 spectators played Elfsborg a draw away against the Poles, 0–0, also at home playing a heroic game with a draw 2–2 and but the Poles advanced furthermore, after more away goals.

=== 2000–present ===
It would take almost 20 years before Elfsborg would participate in the European cups again, after the heaviest period in the club's history Elfsborg was now back at the top layer of Allsvenskan and participated in the UEFA Cup in 2001 after they won the national cup. They stood against JK Trans Narva in the first round, where they won with 1–3 away and then also won with 5–0 at home after a hat-trick by Stefan Andreasson. The second round was against one of the Polish giants Legia Warsaw where Elfsborg lost with a total of 10–2. After winning national cup once again, Elfsborg participated in the UEFA Cup in 2004 where the opponents in the first round was Glentoran F.C. who were beaten with a total of 3–1, in the next round Elfsborg stood against Croatian team NK Dinamo Zagreb, Elfsborg lost the first game away with 2–0 and then played a draw at home 0–0. After winning national championship in 2006 got Elfsborg for the first time participate in the UEFA Champions League. This occurred in 2007 when the first round was against Linfield FC where Elfsborg in the first match played a draw 0–0. To then win at home with 1–0 after a goal by Mathias Svensson. The second round was against Hungarian Debreceni VSC where they won away with 1–0 after a goal by Daniel Mobaeck. They secured promotion to the third round by playing 0–0 at home. The third round was against Spanish giants Valencia CF, where 50 000 spectators at the Mestalla Stadium saw Elfsborg lose with 3–0 after including goal by David Silva. Back at Borås Arena Elfsborg lost again with 2–1 after goals by Daniel Alexandersson and David Villa with Valencia's decisive 2–1 goal.

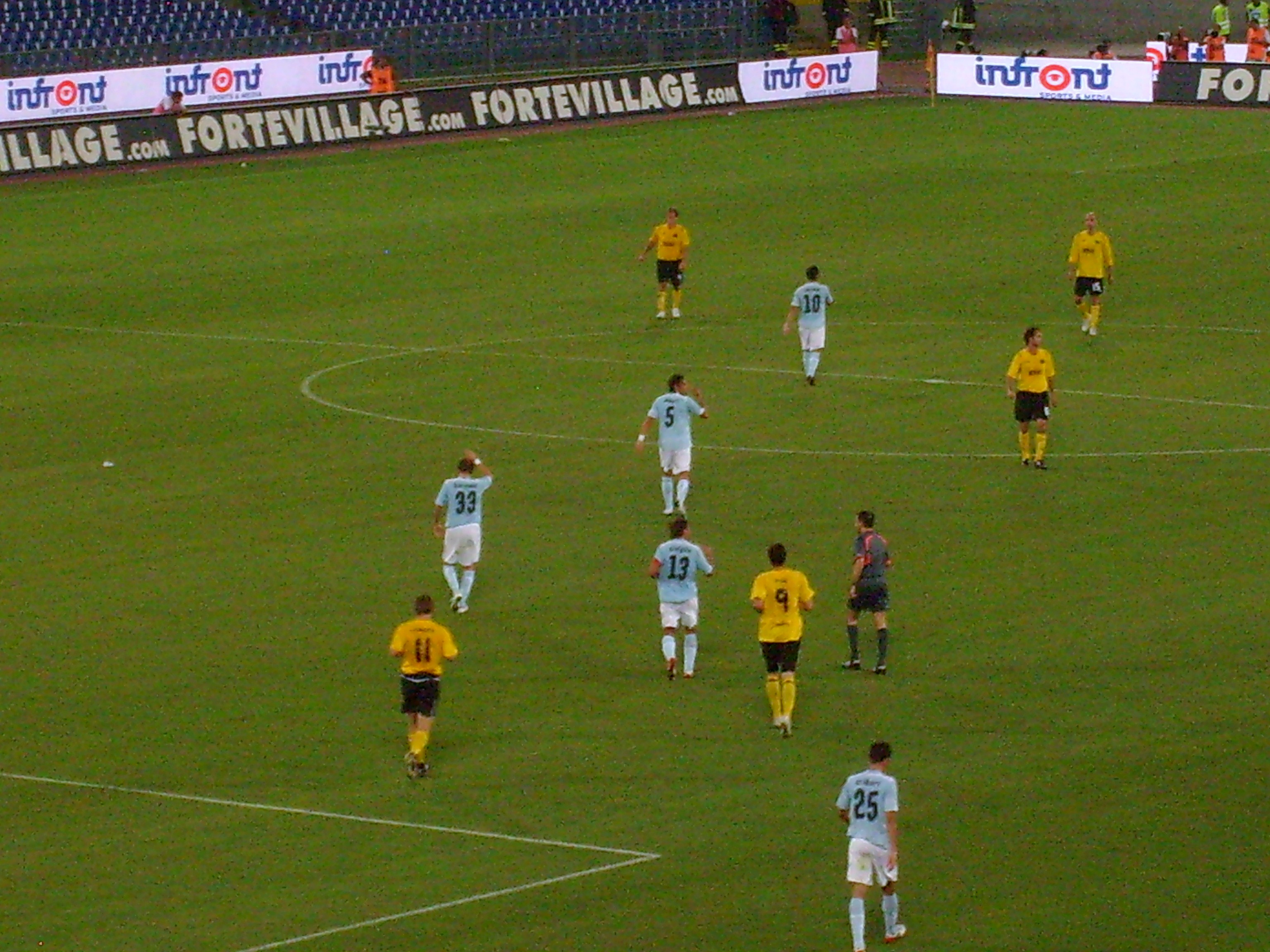
S.S Lazio–Elfsborg at the Stadio Olimpico in Rome, Europa League play-off 2009.

After the excellent results in the UEFA Champions League became Elfsborg directly qualified for the 2007–08 UEFA Cup group stage where they stood against the teams FC Dinamo București, AEK Athens, ACF Fiorentina, FK Mladá Boleslav and Villarreal CF. Elfsborg won against FC Dinamo București with 2–1 and a draw against AEK Athens, 1–1. The following year 2008 achieved Elfsborg for the last time winning the UEFA Intertoto Cup by beating teams HB Tórshavn with a total of 2–1, Hibernian FC with a total of 4–0 and FK Riga with a total of 1–0. Which meant that they finished as group winners. That same year they also played UEFA Cup last time 2008–09 UEFA Cup when it was against the Irish St Patrick's Athletic F.C. but lost surprisingly with a total of 4–3. In 2009 Elfsborg started for the first time playing in the UEFA Europa League where they in the second round stood against Szombathelyi Haladás as they were defeated with a total of 3–0. In the third round was against Portuguese 2010–11 UEFA Europa League finalists S.C. Braga, as they beat them after a completely win by a total of 4–1. In the final play-off round Elfsborg stood against classic S.S. Lazio where they in the first meeting lost with 3–0 and then again after a heroic effort won with 1–0 after a goal by Denni Avdic.

Also the year after 2010 played Elfsborg in the UEFA Europa League where they stood against FC Iskra-Stal in the second round and won with the total of 3–1. The third round was against FK Teteks from Macedonia, a team that Elfsborg won easily against with a total of 7–1. The play-off round was once again against one of the classic Italian teams against Maradona's old club SSC Napoli. Elfsborg succeeded after a heroic performance by goalkeeper Jesper Christiansen to get away from the Stadio San Paolo with a 1–0 loss. Back at the Borås Arena Elfsborg lost anyway with 2–0 after two goals by Edinson Cavani who got his big breakthrough in this match. In 2011 Elfsborg played in the UEFA Europa League for the third consecutive year, and stood against CS Fola Esch in the first round which they won with a total of 5–1. The second round was against FK Suduva where they won easily with a total of 4–1. But in the third round Elfsborg lost surprisingly against the Norwegian Aalesunds FK with a total of 5–1 and failed to reach the play-offs. The same thing happened the year after in 2012. Even if Elfsborg had a perfect start in the qualification by winning a home game in the first stage against Floriana F.C. with 8–0, the biggest international victory in Elfsborgs history. The away game was just as easy, Elfsborg won with 5–0 and with a total of 13–0. In the second stage were the opponents FC Dacia Chişinău and Elfsborg lost the first game after a weak effort with 1–0. But won easy at Borås Arena with 2–0 and therefore advanced to the third stage. In the third stage it would be a Scandinavian battle, since the opponents were Danish AC Horsens. The first away game ended with a draw, 1–1, after Horsens received a penalty in stoppage time. But in their home game Elfsborg lost 2–3 and history was repeated from the previous year, Elfsborg failed once again to reach the play-offs.

=== European statistics ===
(As of 22 June 2015)

Competition	GP	W	D	L	GF	GA
Champions League	10	4	3	3	14	7
UEFA Cup / Europa League	116	47	21	48	177	160

A = appearances, GP = games played, W = won, D = drawn, L = lost, GF = goals for, GA = goals against.

==== Matches ====
(As of 23 January 2025)

- Q = qualification round
- R = round
- Group = group stage
- (a) = away goals rule

Season	Competition	Round	Club	Home	Away	Aggregate
1961–62	UEFA Intertoto Cup	Group B4	(Germany) Tasmania Berlin	5-2	2–3	2nd
1961–62	UEFA Intertoto Cup	Group B4	(Switzerland) Basel	2–1	3–6	2nd
1961–62	UEFA Intertoto Cup	Group B4	(Netherlands) Sparta Rotterdam	2–5	4-3	2nd
1966–67	UEFA Intertoto Cup	Group B5	(Germany) Borussia Neunkirchen	1-0	1–3	3rd
1966–67	UEFA Intertoto Cup	Group B5	(Czechoslovakia) Košice	6-0	3–0	3rd
1966–67	UEFA Intertoto Cup	Group B5	(East Germany) Vorwärts Berlin	0–2	2–0	3rd
1967	UEFA Intertoto Cup	Group B3	(Germany) Werder Bremen	2–2	4-1	3rd
1967	UEFA Intertoto Cup	Group B3	(Poland) Polonia Bytom	1–2	3–0	3rd
1967	UEFA Intertoto Cup	Group B3	(Switzerland) Grasshopper	5-2	3-1	3rd
1971	UEFA Intertoto Cup	Group 2	(Poland) Stal Mielec	0–1	4–0	3rd
1971	UEFA Intertoto Cup	Group 2	(Czechoslovakia) Tatran Prešov	2–3	3–0	3rd
1971	UEFA Intertoto Cup	Group 2	(Denmark) Vejle	4–0	0–4	3rd
1971–72	UEFA Cup	1R	(Germany) Hertha Berlin	1–4	3–1	2–7
1975	UEFA Intertoto Cup	Group 10	(Czechoslovakia) Baník Ostrava	3-1	3–1	4th
1975	UEFA Intertoto Cup	Group 10	(Socialist Federal Republic of Yugoslavia) Čelik Zenica	1–2	2–0	4th
1975	UEFA Intertoto Cup	Group 10	(Portugal) Vitória	1–1	1–0	4th
1978	UEFA Intertoto Cup	Group 8	(Norway) Lillestrøm	0–0	3–5	3rd
1978	UEFA Intertoto Cup	Group 8	(Socialist Federal Republic of Yugoslavia) Sloboda Tuzla	1-0	3–2	3rd
1978	UEFA Intertoto Cup	Group 8	Maccabi Netanya	2–2	7–1	3rd
1978–79	UEFA Cup	1R	(France) Strasbourg	2-0	4–1	3–4
1980	UEFA Intertoto Cup	Group 9	(Socialist Federal Republic of Yugoslavia) Napredak Kruševac	2-0	2–2	1st
1980	UEFA Intertoto Cup	Group 9	(Bulgaria) Slavia Sofia	1-0	2–1	1st
1980	UEFA Intertoto Cup	Group 9	(Germany) VfL Bochum	1-0	2–1	1st
1980–81	UEFA Cup	1R	(Scotland) St Mirren	1–2	0–0	1–2
1983	UEFA Intertoto Cup	Group 10	(Czechoslovakia) Vítkovice	1–2	2–1	4th
1983	UEFA Intertoto Cup	Group 10	(Bulgaria) Botev Plovdiv	0–0	4–0	4th
1983	UEFA Intertoto Cup	Group 10	(Germany) Eintracht Braunschweig	1-0	4–0	4th
1983–84	UEFA Cup	1R	(Poland) Widzew Łódź	2–2	0–0	2–2 (a)
2001–02	UEFA Cup	1R	(Estonia) Narva Trans	5-0	1-3	8–1
2001–02	UEFA Cup	2R	(Poland) Legia Warsaw	1–6	4–1	2–10
2004–05	UEFA Cup	2Q	(Northern Ireland) Glentoran	2-1	0-1	3–1
2004–05	UEFA Cup	1R	(Croatia) Dinamo Zagreb	0–0	2-0	0–2
2007–08	UEFA Champions League	1Q	(Northern Ireland) Linfield	1-0	0–0	1–0
2007–08	UEFA Champions League	2Q	(Hungary) Debreceni	0–0	0-1	1–0
2007–08	UEFA Champions League	3Q	(Spain) Valencia	1–2	3–0	1–5
2007–08	UEFA Cup	1R	(Romania) Dinamo București	0–1	1-2	2–2 (a)
2007–08	UEFA Cup	Group C	(Greece) AEK Athens	1–1	—	5th
2007–08	UEFA Cup	Group C	(Italy) Fiorentina	—	6–1	5th
2007–08	UEFA Cup	Group C	(Czech Republic) Mladá Boleslav	1–3	—	5th
2007–08	UEFA Cup	Group C	(Spain) Villarreal	—	2–0	5th
2008–09	UEFA Intertoto Cup	1R	(Faroe Islands) HB Tórshavn	0–0	1-4	4–1
2008–09	UEFA Intertoto Cup	2R	(Scotland) Hibernian	2–0	0-2	4–0
2008–09	UEFA Intertoto Cup	3R	(Latvia) Rīga	1–0	0–0	1–0
2008–09	UEFA Cup	2Q	(Republic of Ireland) St Patrick's Athletic	2–2	2–1	3–4
2009–10	UEFA Europa League	2Q	(Hungary) Haladas	3–0	0–0	3–0
2009–10	UEFA Europa League	3Q	(Portugal) Braga	2–0	1–2	4–1
2009–10	UEFA Europa League	PO	(Italy) Lazio	1–0	3–0	1–3
2010–11	UEFA Europa League	2Q	(Moldova) Iskra-Stal	2–1	0-1	3–1
2010–11	UEFA Europa League	3Q	(North Macedonia) FK Teteks	5–0	1-2	7–1
2010–11	UEFA Europa League	PO	(Italy) Napoli	0–2	1–0	0–3
2011–12	UEFA Europa League	1Q	(Luxembourg) Fola Esch	4–0	1–1	5–1
2011–12	UEFA Europa League	2Q	(Lithuania) Sūduva Marijampolė	3–0	1–1	4–1
2011–12	UEFA Europa League	3Q	(Norway) Aalesund	1–1	4–0	1–5
2012–13	UEFA Europa League	1Q	(Malta) Floriana	8–0	0-4	12–0
2012–13	UEFA Europa League	2Q	(Moldova) Dacia Chişinău	2–0	1–0	2–1
2012–13	UEFA Europa League	3Q	(Denmark) Horsens	2–3	1–1	3–4
2013–14	UEFA Champions League	2Q	(Latvia) Daugava Daugavpils	7-1	4–0	11–1
2013–14	UEFA Champions League	3Q	(Scotland) Celtic	0–0	0–1	0–1
2013–14	UEFA Europa League	PO	(Denmark) Nordsjælland	1–1	1-0	2–1
2013–14	UEFA Europa League	Group C	(Belgium) Standard Liège	1–1	3-1	3rd
2013–14	UEFA Europa League	Group C	(Austria) Red Bull Salzburg	0–4	0–1	3rd
2013–14	UEFA Europa League	Group C	(Denmark) Esbjerg	2-1	0–1	3rd
2014–15	UEFA Europa League	2Q	(Azerbaijan) Inter Baku	0–1	1-0	1–1 (4–3p)
2014–15	UEFA Europa League	3Q	(Iceland) FH	4-1	1–2	5–3
2014–15	UEFA Europa League	PO	(Portugal) Rio Ave	2–1	0–1	2–2 (a)
2015–16	UEFA Europa League	1Q	(Finland) Lahti	5–0	2–2	7–2
2015–16	UEFA Europa League	2Q	(Denmark) Randers	1–0	0–0	1–0 (a.e.t.)
2015–16	UEFA Europa League	3Q	(Norway) Odd	2–1	0–2	2–3
2021–22	UEFA Europa Conference League	2Q	(Moldova) Milsami Orhei	4–0	5–0	9–0
2021–22	UEFA Europa Conference League	3Q	(Bosnia and Herzegovina) Velež Mostar	1–1	4-1	5–2
2021–22	UEFA Europa Conference League	PO	(Netherlands) Feyenoord	3-1	0–5	3–6
2022–23	UEFA Europa Conference League	2Q	(Norway) Molde	1−2	1–4	2−6
2024–25	UEFA Europa League	1Q	(Cyprus) Pafos	3–0	5-2	8−2
2024–25	UEFA Europa League	2Q	(Moldova) Sheriff Tiraspol	2–0	1–0	3−0
2024–25	UEFA Europa League	3Q	(Croatia) Rijeka	2–0	1−1	3−1
2024–25	UEFA Europa League	PO	(Norway) Molde	0−1	1–0	1−1 (4−2p)
2024–25	UEFA Europa League	League phase	(Netherlands) AZ Alkmaar	—N/a	2–3	26th
2024–25	UEFA Europa League	League phase	(Italy) Roma	1–0	—N/a	26th
2024–25	UEFA Europa League	League phase	(Turkey) Galatasaray	—N/a	3–4	26th
2024–25	UEFA Europa League	League phase	(Portugal) Braga	1–1	—N/a	26th
2024–25	UEFA Europa League	League phase	(Spain) Athletic Bilbao	—N/a	0–3	26th
2024–25	UEFA Europa League	League phase	(Azerbaijan) Qarabağ	1–0	—N/a	26th
2024–25	UEFA Europa League	League phase	(France) Nice	1–0	—N/a	26th
2024–25	UEFA Europa League	League phase	(England) Tottenham Hotspur	—N/a	0–3	26th

=== Rankings ===
==== UEFA club coefficient ranking ====
As of 2 September 2024

Rank	Team	Points
306	(Latvia) FK Liepāja	4.000
307	(Gibraltar) St Joseph's	4.000
308	(Iceland) Vikingur Reykjavik	4.000
309	(Sweden) IF Elfsborg	4.000
310	(Georgia (country)) Dila	4.000
311	(Andorra) FC Santa Coloma	4.000
312	(Sweden) Kalmar	4.000

== Players ==
=== First-team squad ===
As of 3 September 2026

Note: Flags indicate national team as defined under FIFA eligibility rules; some limited exceptions apply. Players may hold more than one non-FIFA nationality.

No.	Pos.	Nation	Player
2	DF	SWE	Viggo Elfström
3	DF	ENG	Jonathan Esenga
4	DF	SWE	Thomas Isherwood (captain)
5	MF	SWE	Ossian Nordvall
6	DF	SWE	Rasmus Wikström
7	MF	SWE	Marcus Rohdén
8	DF	SWE	Sebastian Holmén
9	MF	KOS	Arbër Zeneli
10	MF	SWE	Simon Olsson
11	FW	SWE	Taylor Silverholt
12	GK	DEN	Theo Sander
14	FW	ISL	Gabríel Gunnarsson
15	MF	SWE	Simon Hedlund

No.	Pos.	Nation	Player
16	DF	DEN	Alexander Jensen
17	FW	SWE	Per Frick
18	MF	ISL	Júlíus Magnússon
19	MF	DEN	Julius Beck (on loan from Sturm Graz)
21	FW	SWE	Leo Östman
22	FW	KOS	Dion Krasniqi
23	DF	SWE	Niklas Hult
25	MF	ISL	Ari Sigurpálsson
27	MF	NGR	Abdulmuiz Oluwatimil Oladimeji
29	MF	SLE	Momoh Kamara (on loan from Minnesota United)
30	GK	SWE	Lucas Hägg-Johansson
31	GK	SWE	Isak Pettersson

=== Out on loan ===
Note: Flags indicate national team as defined under FIFA eligibility rules; some limited exceptions apply. Players may hold more than one non-FIFA nationality.

No.	Pos.	Nation	Player
1	GK	SWE	Tim Erlandsson (at Odd until 31 December 2026)
2	DF	GHA	Rufai Mohammed (at Venezia until 30 June 2027)
5	MF	BRA	Wenderson (at Avaí until 1 December 2026)
16	MF	FIN	Altti Hellemaa (at Jaro until 31 December 2026)

No.	Pos.	Nation	Player
20	MF	SWE	Gottfrid Rapp (at Stabæk until 31 December 2026)
24	FW	DEN	Frederik Ihler (at Volendam until 30 June 2027)
26	MF	SWE	Ludvig Richtnér (at IFK Mariehamn until 31 December 2026)
27	MF	NGR	Ozor Okeke (at IK Brage until 30 November 2026)

=== Notable players ===
Sven Jonasson, Elfsborgs greatest player of all time. Also included in the Swedish Hall of Fame.

This list of notable players includes those who received international caps for the Sweden men's national football team, made significant contributions to the team in terms of appearances or goals while playing for the team, or who made significant contributions to the sport either before they played for the team, or after they left.

The players are all listed according to when they debuted for IF Elfsborg:

List criteria:

- Player has made more than 250 Allsvenskan league appearances for the club.
- Player has scored more than 50 Allsvenskan league goals for the club.
- Player has received more than 70 caps for the Sweden national team.
Player included in the Swedish football Hall of fame.

Name	Pos	IF Elfsborg career	Apps	Goals	Honours
(Sweden) Sven Jonasson	FW	1927–47	409	252	3 Swedish Championships, Hall of fame
(Sweden) Åke Samuelsson	MF	1930–41	214	76	3 Swedish Championships
(Sweden) Karl-Erik Grahn	MF	1932–49	346	57	3 Swedish Championships
(Sweden) Gillis Andersson	FW	1933–43	184	67	3 Swedish Championships
(Sweden) Arvid Emanuelsson	MF	1933–47	270	12	3 Swedish Championships
(Sweden) Knut Johansson	FW	1936–44	125	92	2 Swedish Championships
(Sweden) Evert Grahn	FW	1940–46, 1949–52	154	55	1 Swedish Championships
(Sweden) Henry Larsson	MF	1952–54, 1961–68	217	80	1 Swedish Championships
(Sweden) Ove Grahn	FW	1961–65	91	62	1 Swedish Championships
(Sweden) Leif Målberg	DF	1965–71, 1973–80	337	8	337 games for IF Elfsborg
(Sweden) Göran Ahlström	DF	1969–71, 1973–81	258	10	258 games for IF Elfsborg
(Sweden) Leif Gustafsson	DF	1970–71, 1973–82, 1984	276	3	276 games for IF Elfsborg
(Sweden) Thomas Ahlström	FW	1971, 1973–79, 1982–84	237	101	101 goals for IF Elfsborg
(Sweden) Thomas Johansson	MF	1973–83	276	19	276 games for IF Elfsborg
(Sweden) Tobias Linderoth	MF	1997–98	47	4	76 games for Sweden national team
(Sweden) Fredrik Berglund	FW	1997–01, 2003, 2007–08, 2010	166	54	2 Svenska Cupen
(Sweden) Anders Svensson	MF	1997–01, 2005–2015	290	58	2 Swedish Championships,1 Svenska Cupen, 1 Supercupen
(Sweden) Johan Karlsson	DF	2001–11	263	7	1 Swedish Championships, 2 Svenska Cupen, 1 Supercupen
(Sweden) Teddy Lučić	DF	2008–10	68	3	86 games for Sweden national team

== Club officials ==
=== Organisation ===
As of 24 January 2018.

Role	Name	Nation
Chairman	Bo Johansson	(Sweden)
Director	Stefan Andreasson	(Sweden)

=== Technical staff ===
As of 31 January 2019.

Role	Name	Nation
Manager	Oscar Hiljemark	(Sweden)
Assistant manager	Emir Bajrami	(Sweden)
Assistant manager / Fitness	Miguel Beas	(Spain)
Fitness	Dan Fransson	(Sweden)
Goalkeeping coach	Linus Eriksson	(Sweden)
Scout	Anders Svensson	(Sweden)
U21 Coach	Tobias Linderoth	(Sweden)
Fitness coach	Victor Stoltz	(Sweden)
Physiotherapist	Jan Andblad	(Sweden)
Physiotherapist	Johan Meldo	(Sweden)
Club doctor	Matilda Lundblad	(Sweden)
Kit manager	Stefan Ågren	(Sweden)
Kit manager	Reima Haukka	(Sweden)
Football administrator	Martin Andersson	(Sweden)

=== Youth section ===
As of 24 January 2018.

Role	Name	Nation
U21 and U19 team manager	Janne Mian	(Sweden)
U21 and U19 team manager	Sanel Duzel	(Sweden)
U17 and U16 team manager	Tony Lundqvist	(Sweden)
U17 and U16 team manager	Kjell Antonsson	(Sweden)
U15 team manager	Joakim Alexandersson	(Sweden)
U15 team manager	Kari Mäkelä	(Sweden)
Head of youth development	Tony Lundqvist	(Sweden)

== Managerial history ==
Listed according to when they became managers for IF Elfsborg:

- (C) – Caretaker
- (FTC) – First-team coach

List of managers
- 1916–1925: (Sweden) Carl Larsson
- 1926: (Sweden) Erik Börjesson (C)
- 1926–1930: (Sweden) Carl Larsson
- 1930: (England) Skolaut (C)
- 1930–1938: (Sweden) Carl Larsson & Thure Claesson (FTC)
- 1938–1946: (Sweden) Sven Zachrisson
- 1946–1949: (England) John Mahon
- 1949–1952: (Sweden) Karl-Erik Grahn
- 1952–1954: (Sweden) Sven Jonasson
- 1954–1957: (Austria) Adolf Vogel
- 1957–1958: (Sweden) Thure Nygren
- 1959–1960: (Sweden) Sven Zachrisson
- 1961–1962: (Sweden) Karl-Erik Grahn
- 1963: (Austria) Karl Neschy (C)
- 1963–1967: (Sweden) Thure Nygren
- 1968–1969: (Sweden) Hans Karlsson
- 1970–1972: (Sweden) Thure Nygren
- 1973–1975: (Sweden) Lars Hedén
- 1976: (Sweden) Jens Lindblom (C)
- 1976: (Sweden) Bengt Lindroth (C)
- 1977–1982: (Sweden) Rolf Svensson
- 1983: (Sweden) Wåge Eriksson
- 1984: (Sweden) Lars Hedén
- 1985–1986: (Sweden) Leif Målberg
- 1987: (Sweden) Sven Andersson (C)
- 1987: (Sweden) Hans Ohlsson (C)
- 1988–1990: (Netherlands) Jan Mak
- 1990: (Sweden) Leif Målberg
- 1991–1992: (Sweden) Hans Lindbom
- 1993–1994: (Sweden) Håkan Sandberg
- 1995 – 1997: (Sweden) Anders Linderoth
- 1998–1999: (Sweden) Kalle Björklund
- 1999–2001: (Sweden) Bengt-Arne Strömberg
- 2002 – 2003: (Sweden) Anders Grönhagen
- 2004 – 2011: (Sweden) Magnus Haglund
- 2012 – 2013: (Sweden) Jörgen Lennartsson
- 2013 – 2014: (Sweden) Klas Ingesson
- 2015 – 2017: (Sweden) Magnus Haglund
- 2017: (Sweden) Janne Mian
- 2018 – 2024: (Sweden) Jimmy Thelin
- 2024 – : (Sweden) Oscar Hiljemark

=== Notable managers ===
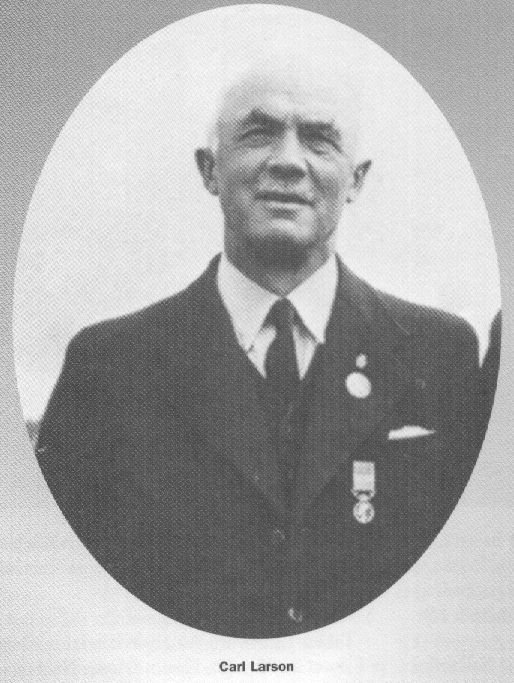
Carl Larsson – head founder, former player and manager of IF Elfsborg. He managed Elfsborg for over 20 years.

The managers are listed according to when they were first appointed manager for IF Elfsborg:

List criteria:

- Won at least one major honour with IF Elfsborg.
- Managed the team for at least 5 years.

Name	Nat	Years	Honours
Carl Larsson	(Sweden)	1916–1925 1926–1930 1930–1938	21 years in total.
Carl Larsson & Thure Claesson	(Sweden)	1930–1938	1 Swedish Championship
Sven Zachrisson	(Sweden)	1938–1946 1959–1960	2 Swedish Championship
Karl-Erik Grahn	(Sweden)	1949–1952 1961–1962	1 Swedish Championship
Thure Nygren	(Sweden)	1957–1958 1963–1967 1970–1972	7 years in total.
Rolf Svensson	(Sweden)	1977–1982	5 years in total.
Bengt-Arne Strömberg	(Sweden)	1999–2001	1 Svenska Cupen
Anders Grönhagen	(Sweden)	2002–2003	1 Svenska Cupen
Magnus Haglund	(Sweden)	2004–2011	1 Swedish Championship 1 Svenska Supercupen 1 The Atlantic Cup
Jörgen Lennartsson	(Sweden)	2012–2013	1 Swedish Championship
Klas Ingesson	(Sweden)	2013–2014	1 Svenska Cupen

== Honours ==
=== Domestic ===
- Swedish Champions: (Note: The title of "Swedish Champions" has been awarded to the winner of four different competitions over the years. Between 1896 and 1925 the title was awarded to the winner of Svenska Mästerskapet, a stand-alone cup tournament. No club were given the title between 1926 and 1930 even though the first-tier league Allsvenskan was played. In 1931 the title was reinstated and awarded to the winner of Allsvenskan. Between 1982 and 1990 a play-off in cup format was held at the end of the league season to decide the champions. After the play-off format in 1991 and 1992 the title was decided by the winner of Mästerskapsserien, an additional league after the end of Allsvenskan. Since the 1993 season the title has once again been awarded to the winner of Allsvenskan.)
  - Winners (6): 1935–36, 1938–39, 1939–40, 1961, 2006, 2012

==== League ====
- Allsvenskan:
  - Winners (6): 1935–36, 1938–39, 1939–40, 1961, 2006, 2012
  - Runners-up (8): 1942–43, 1943–44, 1944–45, 1965, 1977, 2008, 2020, 2023
- Division 1 Södra:
  - Winners: 1996
  - Runners-up: 1991
- Division 2 Götaland:
  - Winners: 1960
  - Runners-up (4): 1955–56, 1956–57, 1957–58, 1959
- Division 2 Västsvenska Serien:
  - Winners: 1925–26
  - Runners-up: 1914–15, 1923–24

==== Cups ====
- Svenska Cupen:
  - Winners (3): 2000–01, 2003, 2013–14
  - Runners-up (3): 1942, 1980–81, 1996–97
- Svenska Supercupen:
  - Winners: 2007
  - Runners-up: 2014

=== European ===
- UEFA Intertoto Cup:
  - Winners: 1980, 2008 (joint winner)
  - Runners-up: 1961

== Records ==
In 2024 Elfsborg played their 81st season in Allsvenskan from its inception in 1924 up to and including the 2024 season. This placing them on a 5th place of those teams who have participated in total seasons. They have also played top-flight football continually in Sweden since 1997, which currently is the 3rd longest top-flight tenure of any club in Sweden—the longest one is IFK Göteborg, since 1977.

The club is currently placed 5th in the all-time Allsvenskan table, "maratontabellen" in Swedish, which is a cumulative record of all match results, points, and goals of every team that has played in Allsvenskan since its inception in 1924–25. Furthermore, Elfsborg is placed 6th in the all-time medal table, with a total of 24 medals of different value – the most recent was received in 2012.

The player in IF Elfsborg who holds most club and national records is Sven Jonasson. In 409 games, most appearances ever in Elfsborg, he scored a total of 252 goals in Allsvenskan, which makes it an all-time record. He played in Elfsborg throughout his career, which started in 1927 and ended 1947, a total of 20 years. What's more, the most remarkable achievement is his unbreakable record of 344 games in consecutive. A record that was broken in a most unfortunate way, he missed his first game in 14 years because of failure to receive furlough during his military service. He was also the first goalscorer ever for the Sweden men's national football team in a worldcup. It was in the 1934 FIFA World Cup, where he scored two goals in Sweden's 3–2 victory against Argentina.

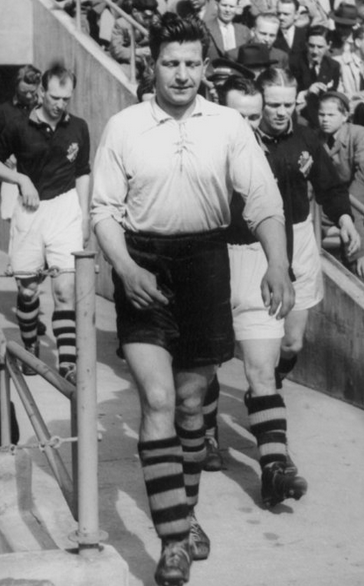
Sven Jonasson, record holder of most consecutive games and goals scored in Allsvenskan.

- Most appearances, total: 409, (Sweden) Sven Jonasson
- Most goals scored, total: 252, (Sweden) Sven Jonasson*
- Most appearances in Sweden while playing for Elfsborg, total: 106, Anders Svensson*
- Most consecutive games, total: 344, (Sweden) Sven Jonasson, 1927–41*
- Biggest victory, Svenska cupen: 19–0 vs. Varbergs BoIS, 21 January 1996*
- Biggest defeat, Allsvenskan: 0–7 vs. GAIS, 25 August 1926
- Home victory, Allsvenskan: 10–1 vs. Degerfors IF, 28 August 1938
- Away victory, Allsvenskan: 12–2 vs. IFK Eskilstuna, 19 April 1936*
- International victory, UEFA Europa League: 8–0 vs. Floriana F.C., 5 July 2012*
- Highest attendance, Ryavallen: 22,654 vs. IFK Norrköping, 1961
- Highest attendance, Borås Arena: 17,070 vs. Kalmar FF, 4 July 2005
- Highest attendance, Ramnavallen: 16,340 vs. AIK, 7 June 1936
- Highest average attendance, season 1961: 14,608
- Highest away attendance, Ullevi: 48 296 vs. IFK Göteborg, 2 June 1977

Allsvenskan all-time record.

=== Team records ===
IF Elfsborg top ten most goal scorers and appearances.

==== Most goals ====
League, Allsvenskan

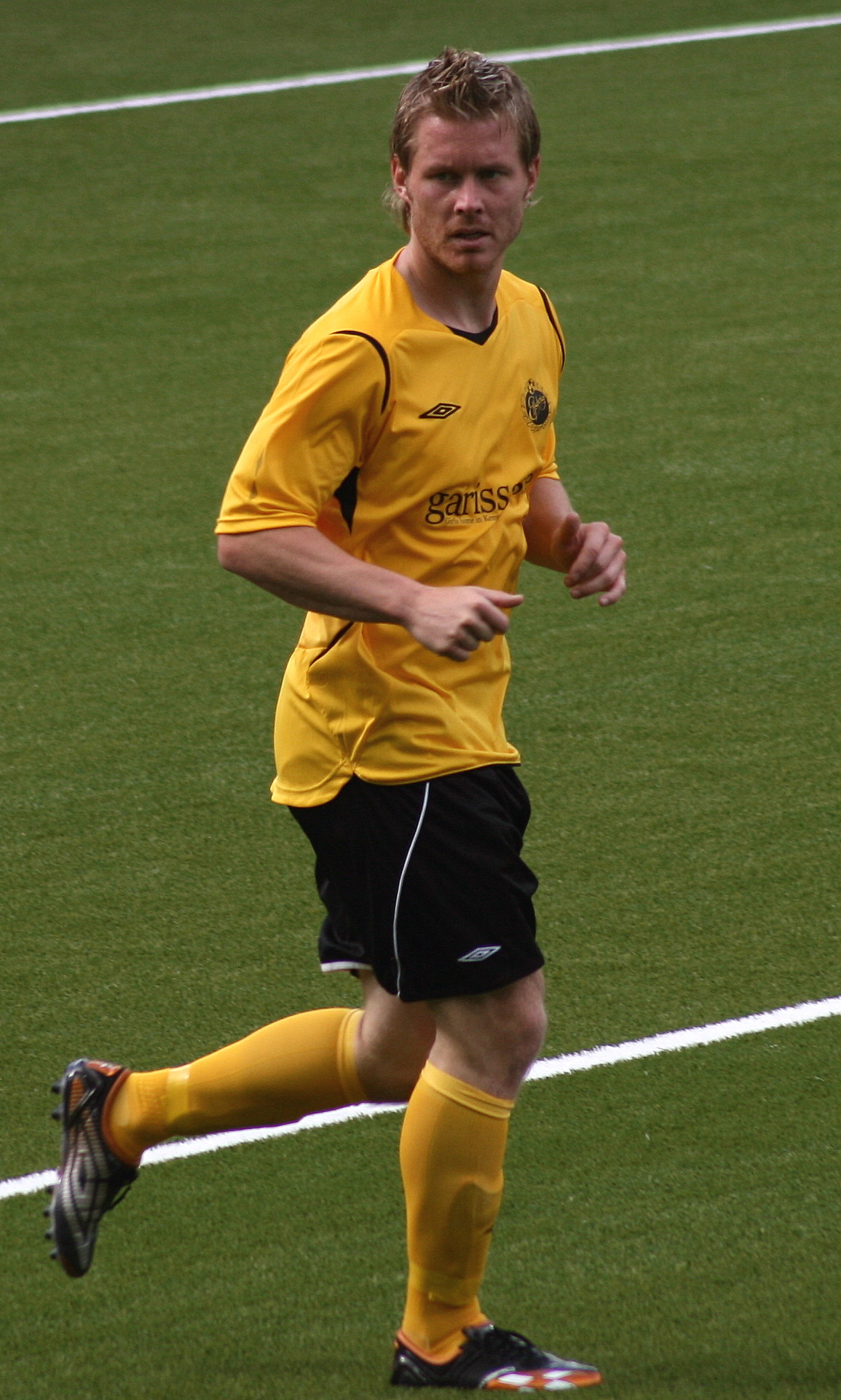
Fredrik Berglund being one of the top-ten scorers.

#	Name	Nation	Career	Goals
1	Sven Jonasson	Sweden	1927–47	252
2	Thomas Ahlström	Sweden	1971, 1973–79, 1982–84	101
3	Knut Johansson	Sweden	1936–44	92
4	Henry Larsson	Sweden	1952–54, 1961–68	80
5	Åke Samuelsson	Sweden	1930–41	76
6	Gillis Andersson	Sweden	1933–43	67
7	Ove Grahn	Sweden	1961–65	62
8	Karl-Erik Grahn	Sweden	1932–49	57
9	Anders Svensson	Sweden	1997–01, 2005–2015	56
10	Fredrik Berglund	Sweden	1997–01, −03, 2007–08, −10	54

==== Most Appearances ====
League, Allsvenskan

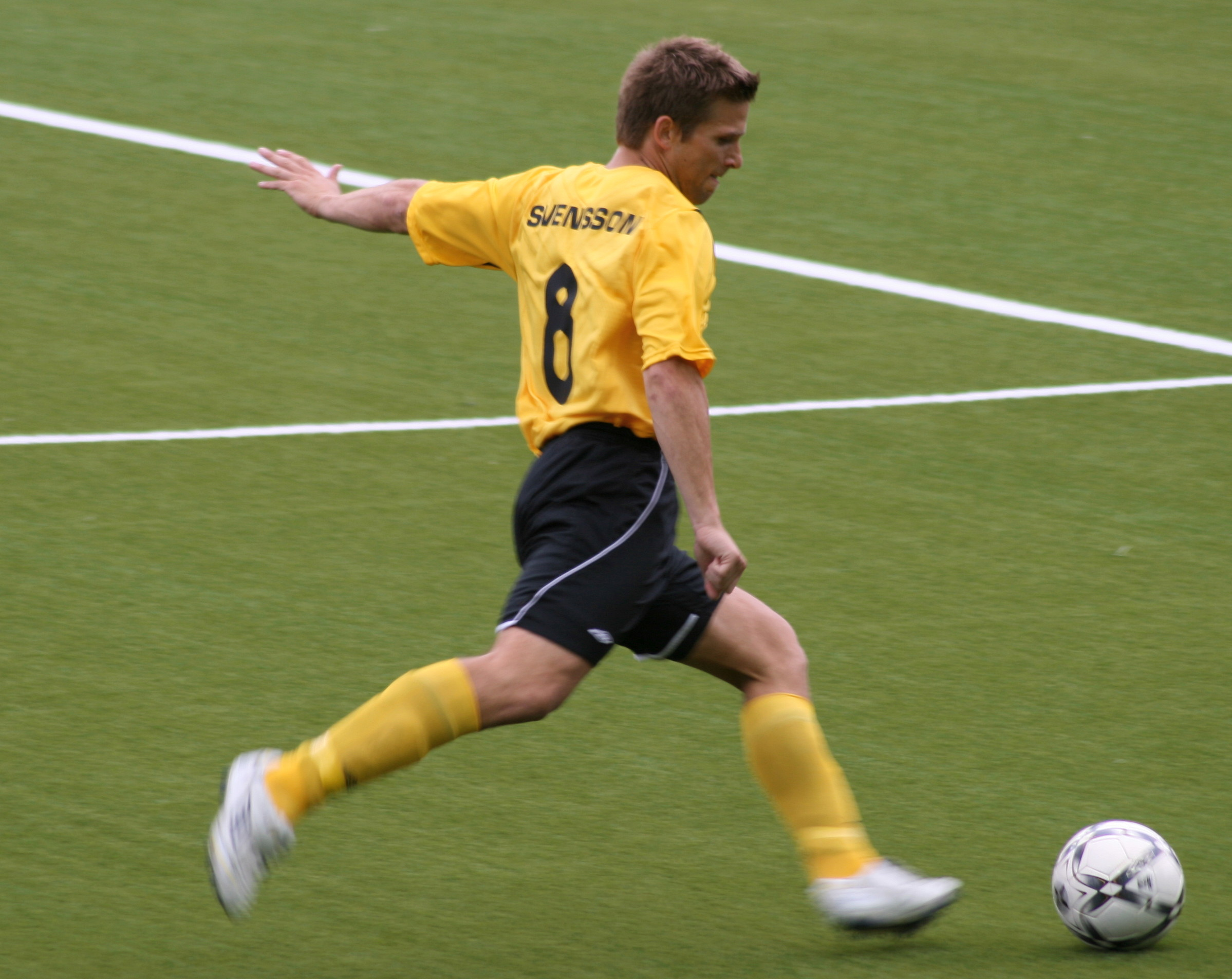
Anders Svensson placing himself on a 4th place on the most appearances in IF Elfsborg.

#	Name	Nation	Career	Appearances
1	Sven Jonasson	Sweden	1927–47	409
2	Karl-Erik Grahn	Sweden	1932–49	346
3	Leif Målberg	Sweden	1965–71, 1973–80	337
4	Anders Svensson	Sweden	1997–01, 2005–2015	289
5	Leif Gustafsson	Sweden	1970–71, 1973–82, −84	276
6	Thomas Johansson	Sweden	1973–83	276
7	Arvid Samuelsson	Sweden	1933–47	270
8	Johan Karlsson	Sweden	2001–11	263
9	Göran Ahlström	Sweden	1969–71, 1973–81	258
10	Thomas Ahlström	Sweden	1971, 1973–79, 1982–84	237

== Literature ==
- 75 år med Elfsborg, Arne Gullberg, 1979
- Jubileumsskrift Elfsborg 90 år, Mats Segerblom, 1994
- 1961 – guldåret, Mikael Häggström, 2001
- ETTHUNDRA, Arne Gullberg mfl, 2004
- Utmanarna – Så ska Elfsborg vinna SM-guld, Henrik Ystén, 2006
- Guldknallen – IF Elfsborg guldlaget, Aftonbladet, 2006
- Guldregn över Borås, Borås Tidning, 2006
- Stå upp för Elfsborg, Per Samuelson, 2007
- IF Elfsborg – en kramgo knalle, Mikael Hjerpe, Idrottsörlaget i Västerås AB, 2010
- Guldbilagan, Borås Tidning, 2012
