= Leif Målberg =

Swedish footballer and manager

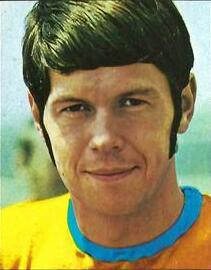
- Målberg in the 1974 FIFA World Cup

Personal information
- Date of birth: 1 September 1945 (age 81)
- Place of birth: Sweden
- Position: Defender

Senior career*
Years	Team	Apps	(Gls)
1965–1980	IF Elfsborg		

International career
1972–1973	Sweden	4	(0)

Managerial career
- 1985–1986: IF Elfsborg
- 1990: IF Elfsborg
- * Club domestic league appearances and goals

Leif Målberg (born 1 September 1945) is a Swedish former footballer.

Målberg played his whole career for IF Elfsborg from 1965 to 1980. He was one of the club's most important defenders at the time. He played 337 games for his club.

He was a member of the Sweden men's national football team in the 1970 FIFA World Cup.
