= 2013 Allsvenskan =

89th season of Allsvenskan

Allsvenskan
- Season: 2013
- Champions: Malmö FF; 20th Allsvenskan title 17th Swedish title
- Relegated: Östers IF; Syrianska FC
- Champions League: Malmö FF
- Europa League: AIK; IF Elfsborg; IFK Göteborg; IF Brommapojkarna
- Matches: 240
- Goals: 659 (2.75 per match)
- Top goalscorer: Imad Khalili (15 goals)
- Best goalkeeper: Etrit Berisha (81 save %)
- Biggest home win: IF Elfsborg 6–0 IF Brommapojkarna (23 May 2013)
- Biggest away win: IF Brommapojkarna 0–6 AIK (26 October 2013)
- Highest scoring: Mjällby AIF 4–3 Helsingborgs IF (19 August 2013); IFK Norrköping 6–1 Syrianska FC (1 September 2013)
- Longest winning run: 6 games Helsingborgs IF
- Longest unbeaten run: 10 games AIK
- Longest winless run: 22 games Syrianska FC
- Longest losing run: 6 games Syrianska FC; Östers IF
- Highest attendance: 43,466; AIK 0–0 Syrianska FC (7 April 2013)
- Lowest attendance: 513; Syrianska FC 1–3 IF Elfsborg (6 October 2013)
- Total attendance: 1,830,374
- Average attendance: 7,627

The 2013 Allsvenskan, part of the 2013 Swedish football season, was the 89th season of Allsvenskan since its establishment in 1924. The 2013 fixtures were released on 14 December 2012. The season started on 31 March 2013 and ended on 3 November 2013. IF Elfsborg were the defending champions, having won their sixth title the previous season.

Malmö FF won the Swedish championship this season, their 20th Allsvenskan title and 17th Swedish championship overall, in the 29th round on 28 October 2013 when they won 2–0 in the away fixture against reigning champions IF Elfsborg at Borås Arena. This was Malmö FF's third Swedish championship of the 21st century having won their last title in the 2010 Allsvenskan season.

A total of 16 teams contested the league: 13 returning from the 2012 season and three that were promoted from Superettan.

== Summary ==
=== Background ===
The annual pre-season kick-off meeting was held in Stockholm on 25 March 2013. All managers accompanied with a key player for their team were interviewed by the two hosts Petter Johansson and Jens Fjellström about the upcoming season and their expectations as well as what team they held as favourites to win the title. Hans Backe acted as a commentator and did a short analysis after each of the teams presentation. Only Malmö FF's Rikard Norling held his own team as the title favourite. Eight managers out of 16 believed that IF Elfsborg would win the title. The remaining managers placed their bets on AIK (three votes), Malmö FF (two votes), IFK Göteborg (two votes) and BK Häcken (one vote). The entire attendance consisted of the clubs' managers, key players and media experts. When asked about Elfsborg's chances to defend their title, only 36.5% of the audience believed that they could. The attendance voted IF Elfsborg as the title favourites (29.7% of the votes) with Malmö FF (22.4% of the votes) and AIK (14.5% of the votes) closely after. The attendance also predicted that Syrianska FC (33.4% of the votes) and IF Brommapojkarna (30.1% of the votes) were the two favourites to be relegated. When asked about the top goalscorer, a majority of the audience voted for Djurgårdens IF's Erton Fejzullahu. For the top assisting player the audience placed their bets on BK Häcken's Martin Ericsson.

=== Season overview ===
The season started on 31 March 2013 with three fixtures. The first match to be played was the Gothenburg derby between BK Häcken and IFK Göteborg which was moved to Ullevi for this specific match, the match ended in a 3–0 win for last years 7th positioned IFK Göteborg. The remaining five fixtures of the first week were played on 1 April 2013 with the match between the reigning champions IF Elfsborg against one of the title favourites AIK at Borås Arena as the most prominent fixture that day, the matched in a 2–2 draw.

Early on IFK Göteborg established themselves in first position after a win in the second round and didn't lose a match until in the seventh round in the away game against AIK, this match was also the first league match AIK won at their new home ground Friends Arena. Helsingborgs IF overtook Göteborg as leaders in the same round. Until the seventh round the main top teams had been Malmö FF who had held onto second position from the third round, Helsingborg, and surprisingly Mjällby AIF. The reigning champions and title favourites Elfsborg started the season with four drawn matches in a row before finally managing a win in the fifth round against Djurgårdens IF. The remaining title favourites AIK and Häcken were positioned 9th and 7th respectively after seven rounds. The teams that were voted most likely to be relegated Syrianska FC and IF Brommapojkarna were positioned 14th and 15th respectively after seven rounds with under-performing Djurgårdens IF occupying 16th and last place.

After the seventh round Helsingborg continued their streak of wins which ensured them to stay in pole position after ten matches had been played. A draw in the Scanian derby against Malmö FF on 29 May ended their winning run of six matches, this was also Malmö's fifth match without winning since their win against Östers IF in the fifth round. This streak of matches made Malmö FF drop to fourth place in the league after ten rounds. In the same time IFK Göteborg had continued to collect points despite their loss against AIK and were two points after leaders Helsingborg in second place. Elfsborg had also overtaken Malmö FF after four straight wins after their four initial draws in the start of the league. AIK and Häcken were still stuck in no man's land in the middle of the table after ten rounds, positioning themselves 10th and 9th respectively. In the other end of the table Syrianska and Brommapojkarna had managed to improve their form and were positioned 13th and 12th respectively. The two last teams after ten rounds were Öster and Djurgården.

In the coming ten rounds a quartet of teams would establish themselves as favourites for the league title. The positions in the top started to change around the 16th round of games when AIK managed to gain contact with the top teams and cling on to a third position in the table, passing IFK Göteborg in the process. Malmö FF gained momentum in the top and rose to a second place while Helsingborg where still top of the table. Elfsborg dropped to a fifth place. After the 20th round the same four teams still topped the table. Malmö FF passed Helsinborg in the same round and took the lead for the first time this season, three points ahead of Helsingborg. IFK Göteborg and AIK were placed third and fourth respectively on the same number of points as Helsingborg, 38 points, although with lesser goal difference. Elfsborg followed in fifth place, seven points after Helsingborg, IFK Göteborg and AIK and ten points after Malmö FF. One of the biggest upsets this far in the season was last years runners up and one of the title favourites, Häcken. Häcken was twenty points behind Malmö FF at this point of the season and in 12th position with only three points ahead of the relegation zone. In the battle to avoid relegation Syrianska and Brommapojkarna were placed 15th and 16th respectively in the relegation positions with Halmstad in 14th place. Syrianska had only managed to collect ten points at this point and were eight points behind Brommapojkarna and Halmstad who both had 18 points. Djurgården who had started the season in the relegation zone managed to escape upwards in the table in the 11th week of games and were placed 10th after 20 rounds.

During the last ten rounds of the league Malmö FF, Helsingborg, IFK Göteborg and AIK continued to battle for the title. The most important developments happened in the 24th and 25th round when IFK Göteborg first defeated AIK at home and in the next week Malmö FF proceeded to win against Helsingborg away. Malmö had also defeated IFK Göteborg at home in the 21st round. At this point Malmö was one point ahead of IFK Göteborg, six points ahead of Helsingborg and eight points ahead of AIK. Although it seemed obvious that Malmö FF and IFK Göteborg were the only title contender left at this point, AIK would continue to chase the two teams while Helsingborg would continue to drop. In the other end of the table Syrianska was confirmed for relegation after a loss against fellow relegation competitor Brommapojkarna in the 26th round. Östers IF was dragged into the relegation battle as Brommapojkarna rose up the table. In the last round Halmstad drew against Brommapojkarna to confirm the relegation of Öster, Halmstad qualified for the relegation play-offs against GIF Sundsvall who finished third in 2013 Superettan and Brommapojkarna managed to stay in the league.

Both Malmö FF and IFK Göteborg lost their matches in the 27th round while Helsingborg and AIK won their matches, making the title race live into the last rounds. However, as Malmö FF still held the lead they had a chance to secure the title with two wins in the last three rounds. After winning at home against Brommapojkarna in the 28th round after a late goal Malmö travelled to reigning champions Elfsborg in Borås to clinch the title in the 29th round. Up until this point AIK had continued to win while Helsingborg and IFK Göteborg had staggered making AIK the only title contender left. It was highly uncertain if the match in Borås would be played as the St Jude storm had made weather conditions in the south west of Sweden unfit for football. However the match was played and Malmö FF won the match and thus the league title with a 2–0 result after two goals by Guillermo Molins. This result also confirmed AIK as runners-up and the last round of the league would only determine which of IFK Göteborg, Helsingborg and Kalmar FF would take the third and final European qualifier position in the table. IFK Göteborg managed to finished third by winning for the first time in five rounds. Kalmar passed Helsingborg in the last round to claim the bronze medal.

Reigning champions Elfsborg finished sixth and BK Häcken, previously one of the favourites for the title prior to the season, finished 10th. Helsingborgs Imad Khalili, who had belonged to IFK Norrköping for half of the season, became top scorer with 15 goals as he scored on a penalty in the 90th minute of the last match. The favourite to become top scorer prior to the season, Djurgårdens Erton Fejzullahu, scored seven goals. Malmö FF's Magnus Eriksson made the most assists with 14, Eriksson also made the most points with 25, this included 11 goals and 14 assists. BK Häcken's Martin Ericsson, who was the favourite prior to the season to make the most assists, finished the season with four assists.

=== Allsvenskans stora pris ===
For the first time in the league's history, the broadcaster of Allsvenskan, C More Entertainment, hosted an award ceremony where they presented seven awards and two special awards to the players and staff of the 16 Allsvenskan clubs, the award ceremony was held on 8 November 2013. Usually some of the awards from the annual "Fotbollsgalan" hosted by the Swedish Football Association included Allsvenskan players. "Fotbollsgalan" also introduced an "Allsvenskan player of the year" award in recent years, however that award will no longer be awarded due to the introduction of Allsvenskans stora pris. The nominations for the 2013 season were officially announced on 6 November 2013. Nominees are displayed below, the winners are marked in bold text.

**Goalkeeper of the year**

- **Etrit Berisha** (Kalmar FF)
- John Alvbåge (IFK Göteborg)
- Johan Dahlin (Malmö FF)

**Defender of the year**

- **Per Karlsson** (AIK)
- Pontus Jansson (Malmö FF)
- Miiko Albornoz (Malmö FF)

**Midfielder of the year**

- **Jiloan Hamad** (Malmö FF)
- Celso Borges (AIK)
- Jakob Johansson (IFK Göteborg)

**Forward of the year**

- **Tobias Hysén** (IFK Göteborg)
- Magnus Eriksson (Malmö FF)
- Moestafa El Kabir (BK Häcken)

**Newcomer of the year**

- **Melker Hallberg** (Kalmar FF)
- Daniel Amartey (Djurgårdens IF)
- Simon Gustafson (BK Häcken)

**Manager of the year**

- **Rikard Norling** (Malmö FF)
- Per-Mathias Høgmo (Djurgårdens IF)
- Nanne Bergstrand (Kalmar FF)

**Most valuable player of the year**

- **Tobias Hysén** (IFK Göteborg)
- Magnus Eriksson (Malmö FF)
- Jiloan Hamad (Malmö FF)

== Teams ==
A total of sixteen teams contested the league, including thirteen sides from the 2012 season and three promoted teams from the 2012 Superettan. One of the two promoted teams for the 2012 season managed to stay in the league, Åtvidabergs FF.

Örebro SK and GAIS were relegated at the end of the 2012 season after finishing in the bottom two places of the table. They were replaced by 2012 Superettan champions Östers IF and runners-up IF Brommapojkarna. Öster returned to Allsvenskan after five seasons after their relegation in 2006, two which were spent in the third tier. Brommapojkarna participated in their fourth Allsvenskan season, they last played in Allsvenskan during the 2010 season. This was notably the first time Brommapojkarna were promoted directly without play-offs.

GIF Sundsvall as 14th-placed team lost their Allsvenskan spot after losing to third-placed Superettan team Halmstads BK 6–4 on aggregate in a relegation/promotion playoff. This was the first time since 2008 that the Superettan team beat the Allsvenskan team and only the fourth time since the play-offs between Allsvenskan and Superettan was introduced in 2000. Halmstad made their Allsvenskan return after only one season in Superettan, having been relegated at the end of the 2011 season.

=== Stadia and locations ===
Locations of the 2013 Allsvenskan teams

Team	Location	Stadium	Turf^{1}	Stadium capacity^{1}
AIK	Stockholm	Friends Arena	Natural	54,000
BK Häcken	Gothenburg	Rambergsvallen	Natural	7,000
Djurgårdens IF	Stockholm	Stockholm Stadion (Until 30 June 2013)	Natural	14,417
Djurgårdens IF	Stockholm	Tele2 Arena (From 21 July 2013)	Artificial	30,001
Gefle IF	Gävle	Strömvallen	Artificial	7,200
Halmstads BK	Halmstad	Örjans Vall	Natural	15,500
Helsingborgs IF	Helsingborg	Olympia	Natural	16,500
IF Brommapojkarna	Stockholm	Grimsta IP	Artificial	8,000
IF Elfsborg	Borås	Borås Arena	Artificial	16,899
IFK Göteborg	Gothenburg	Gamla Ullevi	Natural	18,900
IFK Norrköping	Norrköping	Idrottsparken	Artificial	17,234
Kalmar FF	Kalmar	Guldfågeln Arena	Natural	12,182
Malmö FF	Malmö	Swedbank Stadion	Natural	24,000
Mjällby AIF	Mjällby	Strandvallen	Natural	7,500
Syrianska FC	Södertälje	Södertälje Fotbollsarena	Artificial	6,400
Åtvidabergs FF	Åtvidaberg	Kopparvallen	Artificial	8,000
Östers IF	Växjö	Myresjöhus Arena	Natural	12,000

- ^{1} According to each club information page at the Swedish Football Association website for Allsvenskan.

=== Personnel and kits ===
Note: Flags indicate national team as has been defined under FIFA eligibility rules. Players and Managers may hold more than one non-FIFA nationality.

Team	Head coach^{1}	Captain	Kit manufacturer	Shirt sponsor
AIK	(Sweden) Andreas Alm	(Sweden) Nils-Eric Johansson	Adidas	Åbro
BK Häcken	(Sweden) Peter Gerhardsson	(Lebanon) Mohammed Ali Khan	Nike	BRA Bygg
Djurgårdens IF	(Norway) Per-Mathias Høgmo	(Sweden) Andreas Johansson	Adidas	None
Gefle IF	(Sweden) Per Olsson	(Sweden) Daniel Bernhardsson	Umbro	Sandvik
Halmstads BK	(Sweden) Jens Gustafsson	(Sweden) Stefan Selaković	Puma	Various
Helsingborgs IF	(Sweden) Roar Hansen	(Sweden) Pär Hansson	Puma	Resurs Bank
IF Brommapojkarna	(Sweden) Roberth Björknesjö	(Sweden) Pontus Segerström	Adidas	Dustin
IF Elfsborg	(Sweden) Klas Ingesson	(Sweden) Anders Svensson	Umbro	Various
IFK Göteborg	(Sweden) Mikael Stahre	(Sweden) Tobias Hysén	Adidas	Prioritet Finans
IFK Norrköping	(Sweden) Janne Andersson	(Sweden) Mathias Florén	Puma	Holmen
Kalmar FF	(Sweden) Nanne Bergstrand	(Sweden) Henrik Rydström	Puma	Småländska Hjältevadshus
Malmö FF	(Sweden) Rikard Norling	(Sweden) Jiloan Hamad	Puma	Rörläggaren
Mjällby AIF	(Sweden) Lars Jacobsson	(Sweden) Mattias Asper	Umbro	Stål & Rörmontage Sölvesborg
Syrianska FC	(Sweden) Özcan Melkemichel^{2}	(Sweden) Suleyman Sleyman	Nike	Telge
Åtvidabergs FF	(Sweden) Peter Swärdh	(Sweden) Daniel Hallingström	Uhlsport	Klädhuset Falerum
Östers IF	(Sweden) Andreas Thomsson	(Sweden) Denis Velić	Puma	IST

- ^{1} According to each club information page at the Swedish Football Association website for Allsvenskan.
- ^{2} Syrianska FC's Özcan Melkemichel had the title Manager while Klebér Saarenpää had the title Head coach, the team selection was done by Melkemichel.

=== Managerial changes ===
Team	Outgoing manager	Manner of departure	Date of vacancy	Table	Incoming manager	Date of appointment
Helsingborgs IF	(Norway) Åge Hareide	End of tenure as caretaker	4 November 2012	Pre-season	(Sweden) Roar Hansen	3 December 2012
Åtvidabergs FF	(Sweden) Andreas Thomsson	Sacked	4 November 2012	Pre-season	(Sweden) Peter Swärdh	9 November 2012
Mjällby AIF	(Sweden) Peter Swärdh	Signed by Åtvidabergs FF	5 November 2012	Pre-season	(Sweden) Anders Torstensson	7 December 2012
Östers IF	(Sweden) Roar Hansen	Signed by Helsingborgs IF	3 December 2012	Pre-season	(Sweden) Andreas Thomsson	3 December 2012
Djurgårdens IF	(Sweden) Magnus Pehrsson	Resigned	26 April 2013	16th	(Sweden) Anders Johansson (Sweden) Martin Sundgren (as caretakers)	26 April 2013
Djurgårdens IF	(Sweden) Anders Johansson (Sweden) Martin Sundgren	End of tenure as caretakers	15 May 2013	16th	(Norway) Per-Mathias Høgmo	15 May 2013
IF Elfsborg	(Sweden) Jörgen Lennartsson	Sacked	30 September 2013	6th	(Sweden) Klas Ingesson (as caretaker)	30 September 2013
Mjällby AIF	(Sweden) Anders Torstensson	Resigned	16 October 2013	11th	(Sweden) Lars Jacobsson	16 October 2013

== Suspended matches ==
The 2013 Allsvenskan season encountered one incident involving thrown items and supporter violence, with that match needing to be suspended. This was the first time an Allsvenskan match was suspended since the troublesome 2011 Allsvenskan season when three matches had to be suspended.

=== Djurgårdens IF vs. Mjällby AIF ===
The match on 8 April 2013 at Stockholms Stadion between Djurgårdens IF and Mjällby AIF was suspended after 37 minutes of play, after Mjällby had scored the first goal of the match. Following the goal, several supporters started throwing items on the pitch. Mjällby defender Gbenga Arokoyo was hit in the stomach by a pear thrown by a supporter while celebrating Mjällby's goal. On 12 April 2013 the Swedish Football Association (SvFF) announced that the match would continue at a later date and that play would resume at the specific minute and with the standing result when the original match was suspended. No attendance would have been allowed. Djurgården was also given a 15,000 SEK fine. Mjällby filed an appeal for a 3–0 fixed result in their favour on 26 April 2013, and on 7 May 2013 the SvFF decided to award Mjällby a 3–0 fixed-result victory for the match.

== League table ==
Pos	Team	Pld	W	D	L	GF	GA	GD	Pts	Qualification or relegation
1	Malmö FF (C)	30	19	6	5	56	30	+26	63	Qualification to Champions League second qualifying round
2	AIK	30	17	7	6	54	32	+22	58	Qualification to Europa League second qualifying round
3	IFK Göteborg	30	16	6	8	49	31	+18	54	Qualification to Europa League first qualifying round
4	Kalmar FF	30	14	10	6	35	26	+9	52	
5	Helsingborgs IF	30	14	7	9	61	41	+20	49	
6	IF Elfsborg	30	12	10	8	49	34	+15	46	Qualification to Europa League second qualifying round (Note: IF Elfsborg qualified for the 2014–15 UEFA Europa League second qualifying round by winning the 2013–14 Svenska Cupen.)
7	Djurgårdens IF	30	12	8	10	38	44	−6	44	
8	Åtvidabergs FF	30	11	7	12	37	37	0	40	
9	IFK Norrköping	30	11	6	13	45	47	−2	39	
10	BK Häcken	30	10	7	13	37	41	−4	37	
11	Mjällby AIF	30	10	6	14	46	47	−1	36	
12	Gefle IF	30	7	13	10	34	42	−8	34	
13	IF Brommapojkarna	30	8	8	14	33	54	−21	32	Qualification to Europa League first qualifying round (Note: Sweden was among the best three associations in the UEFA Fair Play ranking and thus received an additional spot in the first qualifying round of the Europa League, IF Brommapojkarna received the qualifying spot for their ranking in Allsvenskans Fair Play ranking.)
14	Halmstads BK (O)	30	7	10	13	32	46	−14	31	Qualification to Relegation play-offs
15	Östers IF (R)	30	6	10	14	27	43	−16	28	Relegation to Superettan
16	Syrianska FC (R)	30	3	5	22	26	64	−38	14	Relegation to Superettan

Source: svenskfotboll.se (in Swedish)
Rules for classification: 1) points; 2) goal difference; 3) number of goals scored.
(C) Champions; (O) Play-off winners; (R) Relegated

=== Positions by round ===
Note: Some matches were played out of phase with the corresponding round, positions were corrected in hindsight.

Team ╲ Round	1	2	3	4	5	6	7	8	9	10	11	12	13	14	15	16	17	18	19	20	21	22	23	24	25	26	27	28	29	30
Malmö FF	11	5	2	2	2	2	2	5	5	4	4	5	4	4	3	2	2	2	2	1	1	1	1	1	1	1	1	1	1	1
AIK	6	10	13	14	11	11	9	10	8	10	7	8	8	5	5	3	3	3	3	4	3	3	4	4	4	4	4	2	2	2
IFK Göteborg	2	1	1	1	1	1	3	2	2	2	3	3	3	2	2	4	4	4	4	3	4	4	3	2	2	2	2	3	3	3
Kalmar FF	3	4	8	8	5	6	6	6	6	5	6	7	7	7	7	6	6	5	6	6	5	5	6	6	5	5	5	5	5	4
Helsingborgs IF	1	3	7	5	3	3	1	1	1	1	1	1	1	1	1	1	1	1	1	2	2	2	2	3	3	3	3	4	4	5
IF Elfsborg	9	8	11	10	7	5	4	3	4	3	2	2	2	3	4	5	5	6	5	5	6	6	5	5	6	6	6	6	6	6
Djurgårdens IF	15	16	16	16	16	16	16	16	16	16	12	12	11	11	10	11	11	10	10	10	10	10	10	10	10	8	7	7	7	7
Åtvidabergs FF	13	15	12	12	13	13	10	7	9	7	8	6	5	6	6	7	7	7	7	9	7	9	8	8	7	9	9	8	9	8
IFK Norrköping	4	2	5	7	10	7	8	8	7	8	9	10	10	10	11	10	9	9	8	7	8	7	9	9	8	7	8	9	8	9
BK Häcken	14	13	9	11	8	9	7	9	10	9	10	9	9	9	9	9	10	11	12	13	12	12	11	11	11	11	10	10	11	10
Mjällby AIF	12	6	3	3	4	4	5	4	3	6	5	4	6	8	8	8	8	8	9	8	9	8	7	7	9	10	11	11	10	11
Gefle IF	5	7	4	6	9	12	13	14	13	11	13	13	13	12	13	12	12	12	11	11	13	13	12	12	13	13	13	12	12	12
IF Brommapojkarna	8	12	10	9	12	14	15	11	11	12	15	14	14	14	15	15	15	14	14	15	15	15	15	15	12	12	12	13	13	13
Halmstads BK	10	11	14	13	15	15	12	13	15	13	16	16	15	15	14	13	13	15	15	14	14	14	14	14	15	15	15	14	14	14
Östers IF	7	9	6	4	6	8	11	12	12	14	11	11	12	13	12	14	14	13	13	12	11	11	13	13	14	14	14	15	15	15
Syrianska FC	16	14	15	15	14	10	14	15	14	15	14	15	16	16	16	16	16	16	16	16	16	16	16	16	16	16	16	16	16	16

Leader and 2014–15 UEFA Champions League second qualifying round
2014–15 UEFA Europa League second qualifying round
2014–15 UEFA Europa League first qualifying round
Relegation play-offs
Relegation to Superettan

Source: everysport.com

== Results ==
Home \ Away	AIK	BKH	DIF	GIF	HBK	HIF	BP	IFE	IFKG	IFKN	KFF	MFF	MAIF	SFC	ÅFF	ÖIF
AIK		2–0	1–1	3–0	3–3	2–1	4–0	2–1	3–1	1–0	0–0	0–1	0–0	0–0	3–2	2–1
BK Häcken	2–3		4–0	2–2	1–3	3–2	1–0	0–1	0–3	1–0	0–1	2–0	2–0	4–0	0–2	0–2
Djurgårdens IF	2–2	1–1		1–1	1–0	2–1	1–1	1–2	2–1	1–2	1–0	3–2	0–3 (Note: The match between Djurgårdens IF and Mjällby AIF was awarded to Mjällby by a score of 3–0. The original contest had to be suspended after 37 minutes and a 1–0 lead for Mjällby when Mjällby defender Gbenga Arokoyo was hit in the stomach by a pear thrown by an unidentified supporter while celebrating Mjällby's goal.)	0–1	2–0	2–0
Gefle IF	1–2	0–0	1–1		2–0	1–2	1–0	0–2	1–1	2–2	1–1	2–0	2–1	2–0	1–0	0–0
Halmstads BK	1–0	0–2	1–4	2–2		0–1	2–2	1–1	0–1	1–1	1–2	1–3	1–0	1–1	0–0	1–0
Helsingborgs IF	1–2	5–0	3–0	5–1	4–2		4–2	2–1	1–1	0–0	2–3	0–3	1–2	2–2	3–0	3–0
IF Brommapojkarna	0–6	1–0	3–0	4–1	1–1	0–2		1–0	2–1	1–0	0–1	1–3	2–0	1–1	0–0	2–2
IF Elfsborg	2–2	0–0	2–0	0–0	2–2	1–1	6–0		0–0	4–1	1–0	0–2	2–1	5–1	0–1	2–4
IFK Göteborg	3–1	3–1	0–0	3–1	1–0	2–4	2–0	3–1		2–0	2–0	1–1	4–2	2–0	3–0	0–0
IFK Norrköping	0–1	4–2	2–3	2–1	3–2	1–4	2–1	1–2	1–2		0–1	0–2	3–2	6–1	2–1	1–1
Kalmar FF	2–1	0–0	1–2	0–0	1–0	1–1	2–2	1–1	2–1	2–2		1–4	2–1	1–0	0–0	3–1
Malmö FF	1–0	1–3	0–2	3–1	1–1	1–1	2–1	2–1	3–1	1–1	1–0		1–0	3–1	4–0	2–0
Mjällby AIF	2–3	1–1	2–0	1–0	5–1	4–3	4–2	2–2	2–1	1–2	0–2	2–2		4–1	0–1	1–1
Syrianska FC	1–2	0–3	1–3	2–2	1–2	0–1	1–2	1–3	0–2	3–1	0–3	2–3	1–2		4–1	0–1
Åtvidabergs FF	1–0	2–2	5–1	1–1	0–1	3–0	4–1	1–1	1–2	1–3	0–0	1–3	3–0	1–0		4–0
Östers IF	2–3	2–0	1–1	1–4	0–1	1–1	1–1	1–3	2–0	0–2	1–2	1–1	1–1	1–0	0–1	

Source: Swedish Football Association (in Swedish)
Legend: Blue = home team win; Yellow = draw; Red = away team win.

== Relegation play-offs ==
6 November 2013
18:30 UTC+1

GIF Sundsvall	1–1	Halmstads BK
Sliper 2'	Report	Baldvinsson 57'

Norrporten Arena, Sundsvall
Attendance: 3,097
Referee: Johan Hamlin (Bro)

10 November 2013
15:30 UTC+1

Halmstads BK	2–1	GIF Sundsvall
Boman 53', 57'	Report	Dibba 14'

Örjans Vall, Halmstad
Attendance: 5,135
Referee: Jonas Eriksson (Stockholm)

Halmstads BK won 3–2 on aggregate.

== Season statistics ==
=== Top scorers ===
Rank	Player	Club	Goals
1	(Sweden) Imad Khalili	Helsingborgs IF/IFK Norrköping	15
2	(Sweden) Tobias Hysén	IFK Göteborg	14
2	(Nigeria) Kennedy Igboananike	AIK	14
4	(Netherlands) Moestafa El Kabir	BK Häcken	12
4	(Sweden) Amadou Jawo	Djurgårdens IF	12
6	(Sweden) Magnus Eriksson	Malmö FF	11
7	(Ghana) David Accam	Helsingborgs IF	10
7	(Sweden) Mauricio Albornoz	IF Brommapojkarna	10
7	(Sweden) Kristian Haynes	Mjällby AIF	10

=== Top assists ===
Rank	Player	Club	Assists
1	(Sweden) Magnus Eriksson	Malmö FF	14
2	(Sweden) Stefan Ishizaki	IF Elfsborg	12
3	(Uganda) Martin Kayongo-Mutumba	AIK	11
4	(Sweden) Mattias Lindström	Helsingborgs IF	9
5	(Sweden) Nabil Bahoui	AIK	8
5	(Sweden) Kristian Bergström	Åtvidabergs FF	8
5	(Sweden) Sam Larsson	IFK Göteborg	8
5	(Democratic Republic of the Congo) René Makondele	BK Häcken	8
5	(Sweden) Martin Smedberg-Dalence	IFK Norrköping	8

=== Top goalkeepers ===
(Minimum of 10 games played)

Rank	Goalkeeper	Club	GP	GA	SV%	CS
1	(Albania) Etrit Berisha	Kalmar FF	22	19	81	9
2	(Sweden) John Alvbåge	IFK Göteborg	30	31	77	12
3	(Sweden) Mattias Hugosson	Gefle IF	23	33	76	7
4	(Sweden) David Mitov Nilsson	IFK Norrköping	25	39	75	2
5	(Sweden) Johan Dahlin	Malmö FF	22	22	74	7
5	(Denmark) Robin Olsen	Malmö FF	10	8	74	4
7	(Sweden) Ivo Vazgeč	IF Brommapojkarna	19	31	73	6

=== Hat-tricks ===
Player	For	Against	Result	Date
(Sweden) Kristian Haynes	Mjällby AIF	Syrianska FC	4–1	12 May 2013
(Switzerland) Aleksandar Prijović	Djurgårdens IF	IFK Norrköping	3–2	22 August 2013
(Sweden) Pablo Piñones Arce^{4}	Östers IF	IF Elfsborg	2–4	25 August 2013

- ^{4} Player scored 4 goals

=== Scoring ===
- First goal of the season: Jakob Johansson for IFK Göteborg against BK Häcken (31 March 2013)
- Fastest goal of the season: 28 seconds, Stefan Selaković for Halmstads BK against Kalmar FF (21 April 2013)
- Latest goal of the season: 94 minutes and 45 seconds, Kennedy Igboananike for AIK against Gefle IF (22 April 2013)
- Largest winning margin: 6 goals
  - IF Elfsborg 6–0 IF Brommapojkarna (23 May 2013)
  - IF Brommapojkarna 0–6 AIK (26 October 2013)
- Highest scoring game: 7 goals
  - Mjällby AIF 4–3 Helsingborgs IF (19 August 2013)
  - IFK Norrköping 6–1 Syrianska FC (1 September 2013)
- Most goals scored in a match by a single team: 6 goals
  - IF Elfsborg 6–0 IF Brommapojkarna (23 May 2013)
  - IF Brommapojkarna 0–6 AIK (26 October 2013)
- Most goals scored in a match by a losing team: 3 goals
  - Mjällby AIF 4–3 Helsingborgs IF (19 August 2013)
- Fewest games failed to score in: 3
  - Helsingborgs IF
  - Malmö FF
- Most games failed to score in: 12
  - BK Häcken
  - Syrianska FC

=== Clean sheets ===
- Most clean sheets: 13
  - Åtvidabergs FF
- Fewest clean sheets: 2
  - IFK Norrköping
  - Syrianska FC

=== Discipline ===
- Worst overall disciplinary record (1 pt per yellow card, 3 pts per red card): 72
  - Syrianska FC (57 yellow cards, 5 red cards)
- Best overall disciplinary record: 34
  - Gefle IF (28 yellow cards, 2 red cards)
- Most yellow cards (club): 57
  - Halmstads BK
  - Syrianska FC
- Most yellow cards (player): 9
  - Alexander Faltsetas (Gefle IF)
  - Fredrik Liverstam (Halmstads BK)
- Most red cards (club): 6
  - Helsingborgs IF
  - IF Elfsborg
- Most red cards (player): 2
  - Dominic Chatto (BK Häcken)
  - Gbenga Arokoyo (Mjällby AIF)
  - Jon Jönsson (IF Elfsborg)
  - Peter Larsson (Helsingborgs IF)
- Most fouls (player): 57
  - Johan Persson (Östers IF)

=== Attendance ===
Club	Home		Away		Total	
Club	Average	Total	Average	Total	Average	Total
AIK	18,900	283,497	9,832	147,487	14,366	430,984
Malmö FF	16,093	241,395	8,158	114,205	12,255	367,639
Djurgårdens IF	12,475	187,132	8,945	134,180	10,710	321,312
IFK Göteborg	11,589	173,831	10,048	150,717	10,818	324,548
Helsingborgs IF	10,284	154,257	8,680	130,200	9,482	284,457
IF Elfsborg	9,077	136,158	7,894	118,408	8,486	254,566
IFK Norrköping	6,269	94,033	7,612	114,186	6,941	208,219
Kalmar FF	5,771	86,563	6,807	102,110	6,289	188,673
Östers IF	5,757	86,353	6,836	95,710	6,174	185,229
Halmstads BK	4,865	72,973	6,896	103,447	5,881	176,420
Åtvidabergs FF	4,287	64,298	6,448	96,714	5,367	161,012
BK Häcken	4,105	61,576	5,935	89,018	5,020	150,594
Mjällby AIF	3,846	57,685	6,325	94,880	5,086	152,565
Gefle IF	3,771	56,561	6,333	94,989	5,052	151,550
IF Brommapojkarna	2,505	37,568	6,664	99,959	4,584	137,527
Syrianska FC	2,433	36,494	8,597	128,959	5,515	165,453
League					7,627	1,830,374

== See also ==
Competitions

- 2013 Superettan
- 2013 Division 1
- 2012–13 Svenska Cupen
- 2013 Svenska Supercupen

Team seasons

- 2013 AIK Fotboll season
- 2013 Djurgårdens IF season
- 2013 Halmstads BK season
- 2013 Malmö FF season

Transfers

- List of Swedish football transfers winter 2012–2013
- List of Swedish football transfers summer 2013
