= Moestafa El Kabir =

Moroccan footballer

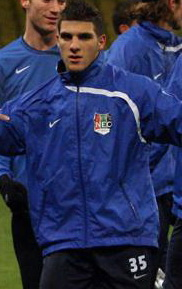

Personal information
- Full name: Moestafa El Kabir
- Date of birth: 5 October 1988 (age 38)
- Place of birth: Targuist, Morocco
- Height: 1.76 m (5 ft 9 in)
- Position: Forward

Youth career
- 2003–2005: Blauw Wit
- 2005–2006: Ajax
- 2006–2007: Feyenoord
- 2007–2008: Utrecht

Senior career*
Years	Team	Apps	(Gls)
2008–2010	NEC	21	(0)
2010–2012	Mjällby AIF	38	(16)
2011–2012	→ Cagliari (loan)	7	(1)
2013–2014	Häcken	32	(19)
2014–2015	Al Ahli SC	11	(3)
2015–2016	Gençlerbirliği	23	(9)
2016	Sagan Tosu	5	(0)
2017–2018	Antalyaspor	28	(4)
2018	→ Häcken (loan)	9	(2)
2018	Ankaragücü	14	(6)
2019	Kalmar FF	8	(0)
2019	Çaykur Rizespor	2	(0)
2020	Örgryte IS	6	(1)
2021	BB Erzurumspor	11	(0)
2021	Hammarby TFF	11	(3)
Total		226	(64)
- * Club domestic league appearances and goals as of 1 March 2022 (UTC)

Moestafa El Kabir (Arabic: مصطفى الكبير; born 5 October 1988) is a Dutch-Moroccan former professional footballer who played as a forward. Starting off his career with NEC in the Netherlands in 2008, he went on to play for clubs in Sweden, Italy, Saudi Arabia, Turkey, and Japan before retiring in 2022.

== Career ==
=== Early life ===
El Kabir revealed he began playing street football and it wasn't until when he was 12 years old, El Kabir joined an organised club, which was Blauw Wit, where he began his football career. El Kabir also revealed that he started out as a defender before playing in a striker position during his time at Blauw Wit.

In 2005, El Kadir joined Jong Ajax and stayed there for two years. He later stated that his reasons of his release was due to his attitude problem. After leaving Ajax, he was offered a contract by rivals, Feyenoord, but the trauma of the abdominal muscles prevented him from joining the club. Nevertheless, El Kabir did join Jong Feyenoord and stayed there for a year before joining FC Utrecht, where he was assigned to the club's reserve team. But in the summer of 2008, El Kabir left FC Utrecht to sign with Eredivisie side NEC on 3 June 2008, starting his professional career. As a result, he signed his first professional contract with NEC, on a one–year contract. Immediately after signing for the club, El Kabir was assigned to Jong NEC Nijmegen.

=== NEC ===
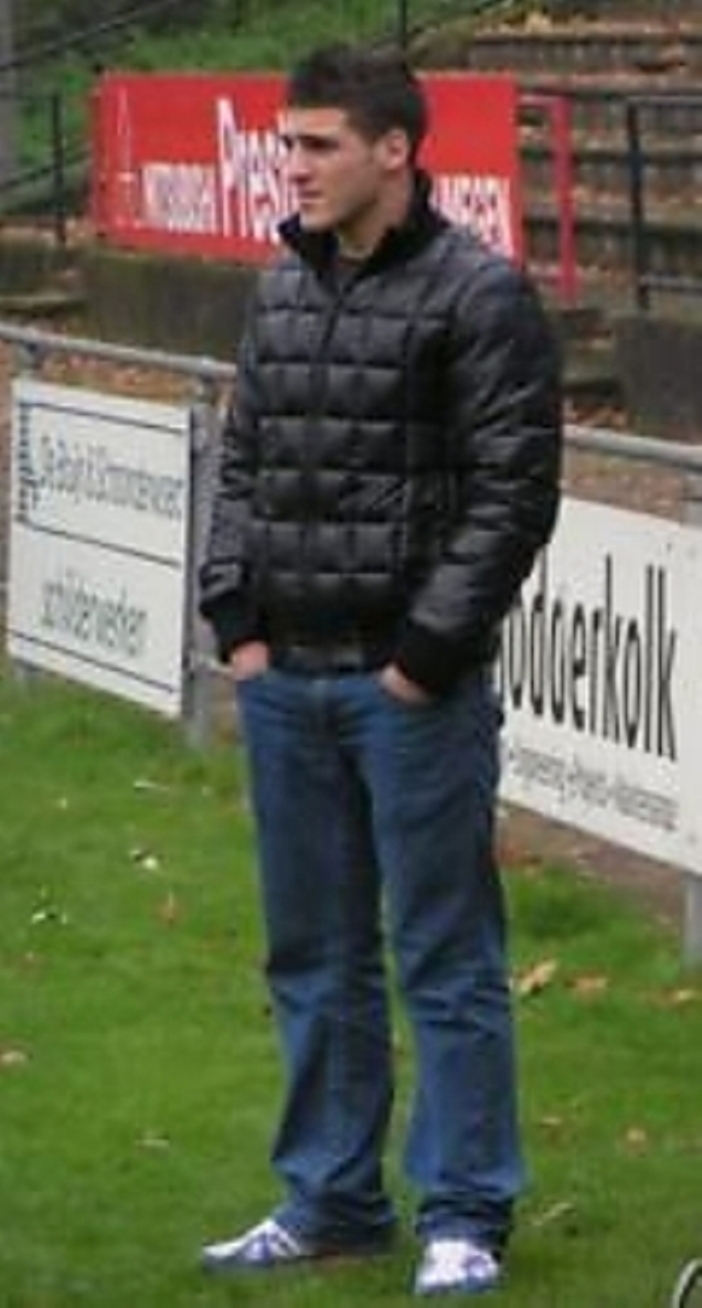
El Kabir on the pitch in casual clothes.

Having impressed Jong NEC Nijmegen in his first five months, El Kabir made his NEC debut, starting a match and played 82 minutes before being substituted, in a 1–1 draw against NAC Breda on 22 November 2008. Five days later on 27 November 2008, he made his UEFA Cup debut, starting the whole game, in a 1–0 loss against Tottenham Hotspur. After the match, El Kabir said about making his tournament debut: "This game was definitely a dream." It was announced on 27 December 2008 when he signed a contract with NEC, keeping him until 2012. Since making his debut for the club, El Kabir received a handful of first team football, mostly coming from the substitute bench. This lasted until he was removed from the first team, due to being disciplined over his weight problems and never played for the side again. Despite this, El Kabir made fourteen appearances in all competitions.

Ahead of the 2009–10 season, El Kabir was recalled to the first team after being given a second chance by Manager Dwight Lodeweges. He then made his first appearance of the season, starting a match and played 81 minutes before being substituted, in a 2–0 loss against Feyenoord in the opening game of the season. A month later on 22 September 2009, El Kabir scored his first goal for the club, in a 3–2 win against FC Eindhoven in the second round of the KNVB Beker. Since the start of the 2009–10 season, he was featured in every match for the side until he was suspended for three matches for unprofessional conduct made during Jong NEC's match against Jong AZ Alkmaar. While serving a suspension, it was announced on 9 November 2009 that El Kabir was dropped from the first team, due to his continuous disciplined over his weight problems and never played for the club again. It was announced on 8 February 2010 that El Kabir was told he would not be playing any more matches for NEC, as result of disciplinary action, and even allowed to leave the club despite having two years left to his contract. Shortly after, he went on a trial at Allsvenskan side Mjällby AIF.

=== Mjällby AIF ===
It was announced on 7 March 2010 that El Kabir moved to Sweden, joining new promoted Allsvenskan side Mjällby AIF, signing a two–year contract. Upon joining the club, he said: "I am really so happy that I'm here in Sweden have signed. It feels like a relief. Finally I feel that I have confidence again. Although I have a two and a half year contract, the plan is to be resold after one year. I want to go higher and know I can. I see it as a good opportunity to put myself in the spotlight again."

El Kabir made his Mjällby AIF debut, starting a match and played 75 minutes before being substituted, in a 0–0 draw against AIK in the opening game of the season. Two weeks later on 29 March 2010, he scored his first goal for the club, in a 2–0 away win against Örebro SK. His second goal for the club came on 19 April 2010 against BK Häcken, scoring the only goal of the game, in a 1–0 win. After being sidelined on two occasions, El Kabir scored in the next two matches between 15 May 2010 and 22 May 2010, scoring twice against Malmö FF and once against Åtvidaberg. Two months later on 4 July 2010, he scored four times in the fourth round of the Svenska Cupen, winning 4–1 against Malmö FF. This was followed up by scoring in a 3–0 win against Örebro SK in the quarter–finals of the Svenska Cupen. However, during a 1–0 loss against IF Brommapojkarna on 24 July 2010, El Kabir was sent–off for the second time in the 86th minute for a second bookable offence. After the match, Manager Peter Swärdh criticised him, describing him as "temperamental" and let down both the team and his teammates. Following a one match suspension, El Kabir returned to the starting line–up against GAIS, as Mjällby AIF lost 3–2 on 7 August 2010. Two weeks later on 21 August 2010, he scored twice for the side, as Mjällby AIF drew 3–3 against Gefle. A month later on 27 September 2010, El Kabir scored his thirteen goal of the season, as well as, setting up the club's second goal of the game, in a 3–0 win against Djurgården. After serving a one match suspension following his booking during a match against Djurgården on 27 September 2010, he scored the next two goals against Halmstad and Kalmar FF. Despite being sidelined throughout the 2010 season, El Kabir continued to be in the first team regular for Mjällby AIF, playing in an attacking position. In his first season at the club, he made twenty–seven appearances and scoring five times in all competitions.

At the start of the 2011 season, El Kabir continued to be in the first team regular despite transfer speculation over his future at Mjällby AIF. He then scored his first goal of the season, in a 1–0 win against Kalmar FF on 16 April 2011. After being sidelined for one match, El Kabir scored twice on his return to the starting line–up, helping the side win 3–0 against IFK Norrköping on 30 April 2011. He then scored twice for the second time this season, scoring against Djurgården, as they won 3–0 on 23 May 2011. In a follow–up match against Gefle, however, El Kabir suffered an injury in early first half and had to be substituted in the 24th minute, in what turned out to be his last appearance for the side this season, as Mjällby AIF drew 0–0. By the time he departed from the club, El Kabir made ten appearances and scoring five times in all competitions.

Following his loan spell at Cagliari ended, El Kabir returned to his parent club halfway through the 2012 season. However, he continued to be linked away from Mjällby AIF as clubs from Europe interested in signing him. Despite this, it wasn't until on 12 August 2012 when El Kabir made his first appearance for the side, coming on as a 64th-minute substitute and set up the club's second goal of the game, in a 4–2 loss against IFK Göteborg. A month later on 15 September 2012, he scored his first goal of the season, as they won 4–0 against GAIS. Since returning to Mjällby AIF, El Kabir was featured in the first team for the next four matches before suffering a knee injury during a match against Gelfe on 23 September 2012 and was sidelined for the rest of the season. At the end of the 2012 season, he went on to make five appearances and scoring once in all competitions.

==== Loan to Cagliari ====
Throughout his time at Mjällby AIF, El Kabir was linked a move away from the club, as clubs from Europe interested in signing him. On 5 April 2011, Cagliari's President Massimo Cellino announced they signed El Kabir on loan for the 2011–12 Serie A season. Two months later on 15 June 2011, the club confirmed the move, which included an option to sign him permanently on a four–year contract.

El Kabir made his debut for the club, coming on as an 87th-minute substitute, and scored the club's second goal of the game, in a 2–1 win away match against Roma on 11 September 2011. However, he suffered a muscle injury that kept him out for a month. Although El Kabir did recover from a muscle injury in early–October, his return was short–lived when he suffered another muscle injury strain that kept him out for the rest of 2011. After recovering from his muscle injury strain in late–December, it wasn't until on 8 January 2012 when El Kabir returned to the first team, coming on as an 83rd-minute substitute, in a 3–0 win against Genoa. He then made his first start for the side, playing 56 minutes before being substituted, in a 0–0 draw against Novara on 5 February 2012. However, El Kabir was plagued with injuries once more that eventually ruled him out for the rest of the season. At the end of the 2011–12 season, he went on to make seven appearances and scoring once in all competitions.

Following this, Cagliari announced it decided against exercise the option to sign El Kabir permanently and returned to Mjällby.

=== BK Häcken ===
In November 2012, Häcken announced the signing of El Kabir, signing a three–year contract with the club.

El Kabir made his Häcken debut in the Svenska Cupen against Falkenberg and set up the club's only goal of the game, as they lost 2–1. This was followed by scoring three more goals, including a brace against IFK Värnamo. He then made his league debut for the club, starting the whole game, in a 3–0 loss against IFK Göteborg in the opening game of the season. Two weeks later on 14 April 2013, he scored his first goals for the club, in a 4–0 win against Djurgården. El Kabir's goal scoring spree continued throughout the first half of the season, eventually scoring thirteen times in all competitions. His performance earned him June's Player of the Month. He played an important role in the first leg of UEFA Europa League Second Qualifying Round, setting up both goals, in a 2–2 draw against Sparta Prague. Eventually, BK Häcken were through to the next round following a 1–0 win in the second leg. After being sidelined for one match, El Kabir then added two more goals in the next matches against AIK and IFK Göteborg. During a match against IFK Göteborg on 4 August 2013, he sustained a back injury and was substituted in the 21st minute. Following this, it was announced that he was out until October. But El Kabir made his return to the first team on 30 September 2013, coming on as a 75th-minute substitute, in a 0–0 draw against Gelfe. Despite suffering from injuries during the 2013 season, he was a first team regular, playing in a striker position. In his first season at BK Häcken, El Kabir made twenty–nine appearances and scoring fifteen times in all competitions, making him a top scorer this season.

Ahead of the 2014 season, El Kabir was linked with a move to Danish side Brøndby and the player, himself, was interested in the move. Amid the transfer speculation, El Kabir started the season well when he scored three times in the Svenska Cupen against Örgryte and Mjällby AIF (twice). However, during a match against Elfsborg in the Svenska Cupen, El Kabir suffered an injury and was substituted in the 53rd minute. But he made a quickly recovery and returned to the starting line–up in the opening game of the season against IFK Norrköping, setting up the opening game of the game and scoring the club's second goal of the game, as they won 2–0. Two weeks later on 13 April 2014, El Kabir scored the next two goals, scoring against Helsingborg and Halmstad. After missing one match due to injury, he added three more goals, including a brace against Malmö FF on 4 May 2014. El Kabir then added his tenth goal of the season, scoring in a 4–1 win against Kalmar FF on 20 May 2014. Despite missing two more matches later in the season, he remained as a first team regular, playing in the striker position. By the time he departed from the club, he made fourteen appearances and scoring ten times in all competitions.

=== Al Ahli ===
In July 2014, El Kabir joined Al Ahli SC on a one-and-a-half-year contract for a reported fee of SEK 8 and 9 million.

He made his debut against Najran SC in the 2014–15 Saudi Professional League, in which Al Ahli SC had drawn 1–1 on 23 August 2014. It wasn't until on 13 September 2014 when El Kabir scored his first goal for Al Ahli SC against Al-Khaleej. It wasn't until on 12 December 2014 when he scored a brace, in a 4–1 win against Al-Taawoun. After making twelve appearances and scoring three times for the side, he left the club on 12 January 2015.

=== Gençlerbirliği ===
It was announced on 2 February 2015 that El Kabir signed for Gençlerbirliği on a two–year contract.

Two days later on 4 February 2015 after signing for the club, he made his Gençlerbirliği debut, starting the whole game, in a 0–0 draw against Konyaspor. A month later on 7 March 2015 against Kayseri Erciyesspor, El Kabir provided four assists in the club's four goals of the game, as they won 4–2. In a follow–up match against Fenerbahçe, he scored his first goal for the club, in a 2–1 win. Three weeks later on 4 April 2015, El Kabir scored a hat–trick, as well as, setting up the club's third goal of the game, in a 5–2 win against Kasımpaşa. A week later on 14 April 2015, he scored his fifth goal of the season, as well as, setting up the club's first goal of the game, in a 3–2 loss against Bursaspor in the second leg of the Turkish Cup quarter–final. However, in a follow–up match against Kardemir Karabükspor, he was sent–off for a second bookable offence, as Gençlerbirliği lost 2–1. Having become a first team regular, playing in a striker position, El Kabir went on to make eighteen appearances and scoring five times in all competitions.

In the 2015–16 season, El Kabir continued to be a first team regular at Gençlerbirliği, playing in a striker position. It wasn't until on 23 August 2015 when he scored his first goal of the season, in a 3–1 loss against Antalyaspor. El Kabir added three more goals between 3 October 2015 and 17 October 2015, including twice against Kayserispor. After serving a one match suspension, he scored on his return on 29 November 2015, helping the side draw 2–2 against Gaziantepspor. It wasn't until on 13 February 2016 when El Kabir scored his seventh goal of the season and set up the club's first goal of the game, in a 2–0 win against Bursaspor. Two months later on 25 April 2016, he scored his eighth goal of the season and set up the club's second goal of the game, in a 3–1 win against Gaziantepspor. Despite being sidelined during the 2015–16 season, El Kabir went on to make twenty–eight appearances and scoring eight times in all competitions.

During his time at Gençlerbirliği, El Kabir earned a nickname "Tank" from his teammates, due to his strong physique.

=== Sagan Tosu ===
It was announced on 22 July 2016 that El Kabir joined J1 League side Sagan Tosu for the 2016 season. It came after when El Kabir told the club's technical director İbrahim Üzülmez that he wanted to leave. Prior to leaving Gençlerbirliği, El Kabir said he was in Turkey when the 2016 coup d'état attempt took place in country, as a reason of him leaving the club.

It wasn't until on 6 August 2016 when he made his Sagan Tosu debut, coming on as a 68th-minute substitute, in a 2–1 loss against Gamba Osaka. El Kabir made his first start for the side, playing 66 minutes before being substituted, in a 1–0 win against Albirex Niigata on 27 August 2016. A week later on 3 September 2016, he scored his first goal for the club and then set up the club's second goal of the game, in a 3–1 win against FC Ryukyu in the second round of the Emperor's Cup. His run in the first team appearances resulted in him making eight appearances and scoring once in all competitions.

It was announced on 22 January 2017 that El Kabir left Sagan Tosu by mutual consent. It came after when he had his contract renewed for the 2017 season.

=== Antalyaspor ===
Two days after leaving Japan, El Kabir returned to Turkey to sign for Antalyaspor on a two–year and a half contract.

El Kabir made his Antalyaspor debut on 12 February 2017 against Konyaspor and scored the opening goal of the game, in a 1–1 draw. It wasn't until on 1 April 2017 when he scored his second goal for the club, as well as, setting up the club's first goal of the game, in a 2–1 win against Kayserispor. El Kabir then scored his third goal for Antalyaspor, in a 5–2 win against Adanaspor on 30 April 2017. Despite being on the sidelines on three occasions later in the 2016–17 season, El Kabir was a first team regular, as he made eleven appearances and scoring three times in all competitions.

However, in the 2017–18 season, El Kabir struggled to regain his first team place in the starting line–up and mostly coming on as a substitute. It wasn't until on 12 December 2017 when he scored his first goal of the season, in a 3–2 loss against Orhangazispor. After suffering an injury, El Kabir scored his second goal of the season on his return from injury, in a 3–1 win against Yeni Malatyaspor on 3 February 2018. However, his return was short–lived when he fell out of the club's management and was dropped from the first team squad, never playing for the side again. By the time El Kabir departed from Antalyaspor, he made twenty appearances and scoring once in all competitions. On 4 June 2018, El Kabir announced that he's become a free agent.

==== Loan to BK Häcken ====
It was announced on 26 March 2018 that El Kabir joined Häcken on loan for the second time in his career.

El Kabir scored on his debut in his BK Häcken second spell, scoring the only goal of the game, in a 1–0 win against Kalmar FF in the opening game of the season. Three weeks later on 22 April 2018, he scored his second goal for the club, in a 2–2 draw against Hammarby. Despite being a first team regular, El Kabir was subjected of criticism over his performance by the Swedish media. Although he was sidelined on two occasions, including being sent–off for a second bookable offence in a 2–0 loss against Malmö on 20 May 2018, he went on to make eight appearances and scoring two times in all competitions.

=== Ankaragücü ===
It was announced on 16 July 2018 that El Kabir returned to Turkey by signing for Ankaragücü, signing a one–year contract.

El Kabir started the season well when he scored on his debut in the opening game of the season, losing 3–1 against Galatasaray. El Kabir then scored his second goal for the club, in a 1–0 win against Akhisar Belediyespor a month later on 15 September 2018. He then started in the first seven league matches before being sidelined with an injury. It wasn't until on 28 October 2018 when El Kabir scored on his return from injury, in a 3–1 win against Fenerbahçe. He then went on a scoring spree, adding three more goals to his tally. However, El Kabir's first team opportunities soon became limited after refusing play for Ankaragücü and never played for the side again. It was announced on 7 March 2019 that El Kabir left the club by mutual consent. By the time he departed from Ankaragücü, El Kabir went on to make fourteen appearances and scoring six times for the side.

=== Kalmar FF ===
On 11 March 2019, it was announced that Kalmar FF signed El Kabir on a free transfer until June.

El Kabir made his Kalmar FF debut, coming on as a 65th-minute substitute, in a 1–1 draw against Hammarby on 7 April 2019. Since making his debut for the club, he found himself in and out of the starting line–up for the side, but failed to score a goal. It was announced on 30 May 2019 that El Kabir left the club with immediate effect. Despite suffering from an injury along the way, he made eight appearances for Kalmar FF.

=== Çaykur Rizespor ===
It was announced on 7 July 2019 Çaykur Rizespor signed El Kabir on a one–year contract.

He made his Çaykur Rizespor debut, starting the whole game, and set up the only goal of the game, in a 1–0 win against Gençlerbirliği in the opening game of the season. However, in a follow–up match against Sivasspor, El Kabir fractured his fibula and was substituted in the 13th minute. Following the match, it was announced that he was sidelined for three months and never played for the club again. After making two appearances, it was announced on 13 January 2020 that El Kabir left Çaykur Rizespor by mutual consent.

=== Örgryte IS ===
On 23 September 2020, El Kabir signed a deal with Örgryte IS in Superettan, Sweden's second tier, for the remainder of the year. He made six league appearances for the club, scoring once in a 4–1 win against Östers IF, before leaving at the end of the season.

=== BB Erzurumspor ===
On 20 January 2021, El Kabir moved back to the Turkish Süper Lig, signing with BB Erzurumspor. He made 11 appearances during the spring, but was unable to save the club from a relegation to the second division.

=== Hammarby TFF ===
On 2 August 2021, El Kabir signed a contract with Hammarby TFF, the feeder team of Allsvenskan club Hammarby IF, competing in Ettan, Sweden's third tier. He was sought out as a mentor for the younger players in the squad.

=== Retirement ===
On 5 October 2022, El Kabir's 34th birthday, he announced his retirement from professional football.

== Personal life ==
Born on 5 October 1988 in Targuist, Morocco, in the province of Al Hoceima, El Kabir's family returned to Amsterdam after 20 days in Morocco, where they were on vacation at the time. Growing up with five brothers (including footballer Othman El Kabir) and one sister, El Kabir revealed that their family were poor and explained why he started playing football at a late age. His father worked as a Stonemasonry and a labour immigrant to help the family. In addition to speaking Dutch, he speaks Swedish, Italian and English. El Kabir has a daughter, Aaliyah. El Kabir is a Muslim, having grown up in a Muslim environment.

Although his parents were from Morocco and was born in the country, himself, El Kabir holds a Dutch passport, making him eligible to play for Morocco and Netherlands. But he stated that he feels more Moroccan than Dutch and was open to play for the national team. During his time at Sweden, El Kabir lives in Sölvesborg and Fridhem in Högadal. However, lack of recognition from Morocco led El Kabir to change his mind, saying he's open to play for Sweden instead. El Kabir stated in an interview that he wanted to be a football coach once his playing days are over.

== Career statistics ==
As of 22 November 2021

Club	Season	League			Cup		Continental		Total	
Club	Season	Division	Apps	Goals	Apps	Goals	Apps	Goals	Apps	Goals
NEC	2008–09	Eredivisie	10	0	—		4	0	14	0
NEC	2009–10	Eredivisie	11	0	1	1	—		12	1
NEC	Total		21	0	1	1	4	0	26	1
Mjällby AIF	2010	Allsvenskan	24	10	4	5	—		28	15
Mjällby AIF	2011	Allsvenskan	9	5	1	0	—		10	5
Mjällby AIF	2012	Allsvenskan	5	1	1	0	—		6	1
Mjällby AIF	Total		38	16	6	5	0	0	44	21
Cagliari (loan)	2011–12	Serie A	7	1	—		—		7	1
BK Häcken	2013	Allsvenskan	22	12	3	3	3	0	28	15
BK Häcken	2014	Allsvenskan	10	7	4	3	—		14	10
BK Häcken	Total		32	19	7	6	3	0	42	25
Al Ahli SC	2014–15	Saudi Professional League	11	3	2	1	—		13	4
Gençlerbirliği	2014–15	Süper Lig	15	4	3	1	—		18	5
Gençlerbirliği	2015–16	Süper Lig	28	8	0	0	—		28	8
Gençlerbirliği	Total		43	12	3	1	0	0	46	13
Sagan Tosu	2016	J1 League	5	0	1	0	—		6	0
Antalyaspor	2016–17	Süper Lig	11	3	3	1	—		14	4
Antalyaspor	2017–18	Süper Lig	17	1	2	0	—		19	1
Antalyaspor	Total		28	4	5	1	0	0	33	5
BK Häcken (loan)	2018	Allsvenskan	9	2	0	0	—		9	2
Ankaragücü	2018–19	Süper Lig	14	6	2	0	—		16	6
Kalmar FF	2019	Allsvenskan	8	0	0	0	—		8	0
Çaykur Rizespor	2019–20	Süper Lig	2	0	0	0	—		2	0
Örgryte IS	2020	Superettan	6	1	1	0	—		7	1
BB Erzurumspor	2020–21	Süper Lig	11	0	0	0	—		11	0
Hammarby TFF	2021	Ettan	11	3	0	0	—		11	3
Career total			246	67	28	15	7	0	281	82
