= Sven-Agne Larsson =

Swedish footballer and manager (1925–2006)

Personal information
- Date of birth: 6 October 1925
- Date of death: 5 January 2006 (aged 80)
- Position: Midfielder

Senior career*
Years	Team	Apps	(Gls)
1943–1955	BK Häcken		

Managerial career
- 1958–1959: BK Häcken
- 1961–1963: Örgryte IS
- 1966–1970: Örgryte IS
- 1971–1972: Åtvidabergs FF
- 1973–1975: Halmstads BK
- 1976: Kiruna FF
- 1979–1982: Örgryte IS
- 1984–1985: Hamarkameratene
- * Club domestic league appearances and goals

Sven-Agne Larsson (6 October 1925 – 5 January 2006) was a Swedish football player and manager who played as a midfielder.
