= Simon Bengtsson =

Swedish footballer (born 2004)

Personal information
- Full name: Erik Simon Bengtsson
- Date of birth: 23 April 2004 (age 22)
- Place of birth: Sweden
- Height: 1.77 m (5 ft 10 in)
- Position: Left-back

Team information
- Current team: Helsingborg
- Number: 5

Youth career
- –2022: Helsingborg

Senior career*
Years	Team	Apps	(Gls)
2022–	Helsingborg	80	(3)
2024	→ AC Oulu (loan)	13	(0)

International career^{‡}
2019	Sweden U15	2	(0)
2024–	Sweden U20	2	(0)
- * Club domestic league appearances and goals as of 12 November 2026 ‡ National team caps and goals as of 18:20, 21 April 2025 (UTC)

Erik Simon Bengtsson (born 23 April 2004) is a Swedish professional footballer who plays as a left-back for Helsingborgs IF.

== Club career ==
Bengtsson advanced through the youth sector of Helsingborgs IF, and made his senior debut with the club's first team in Allsvenskan in 2022.

On 27 June 2024, Bengtsson was loaned out to AC Oulu in Veikkausliiga for the rest of the 2024 season.

== Career statistics ==
As of 5 May 2025

Appearances and goals by club, season and competition
Club	Season	League			National cup (Note: Includes Svenska Cupen)		Europe		Other		Total	
Club	Season	Division	Apps	Goals	Apps	Goals	Apps	Goals	Apps	Goals	Apps	Goals
Helsingborg	2022	Allsvenskan	3	0	3	0	–		–		6	0
Helsingborg	2023	Superettan	24	1	4	0	–		–		28	1
Helsingborg	2024	Superettan	2	0	0	0	–		–		2	0
Helsingborg	2025	Superettan	3	0	1	0	–		–		4	0
Helsingborg	Total		32	1	8	0	–	–	–	–	40	1
AC Oulu (loan)	2024	Veikkausliiga	13	0	0	0	–		0	0	13	0
Career total			45	1	8	0	0	0	0	0	53	1
