= List of Helsingborgs IF players =

This list is about Helsingborgs IF players with at least 100 league appearances. For a list of all Helsingborgs IF players with a Wikipedia article, see Category:Helsingborgs IF players. For the current Helsingborgs IF first-team squad, see First-team squad.

This is a list of Helsingborgs IF players with at least 100 league appearances.

== Players ==
Matches of current players as of 27 March 2014.

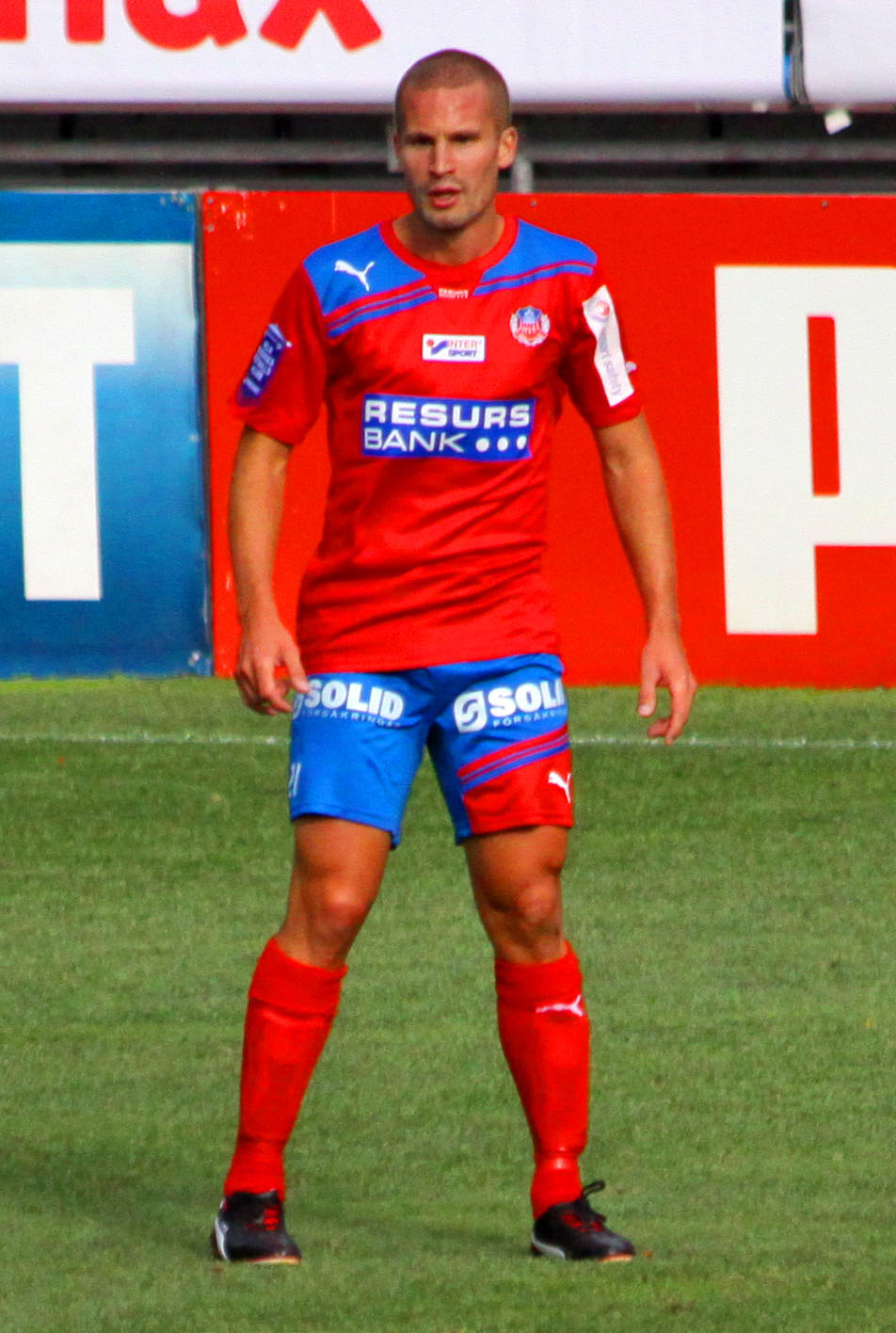
Christoffer Andersson has made 319 league appearances for Helsingborgs IF.

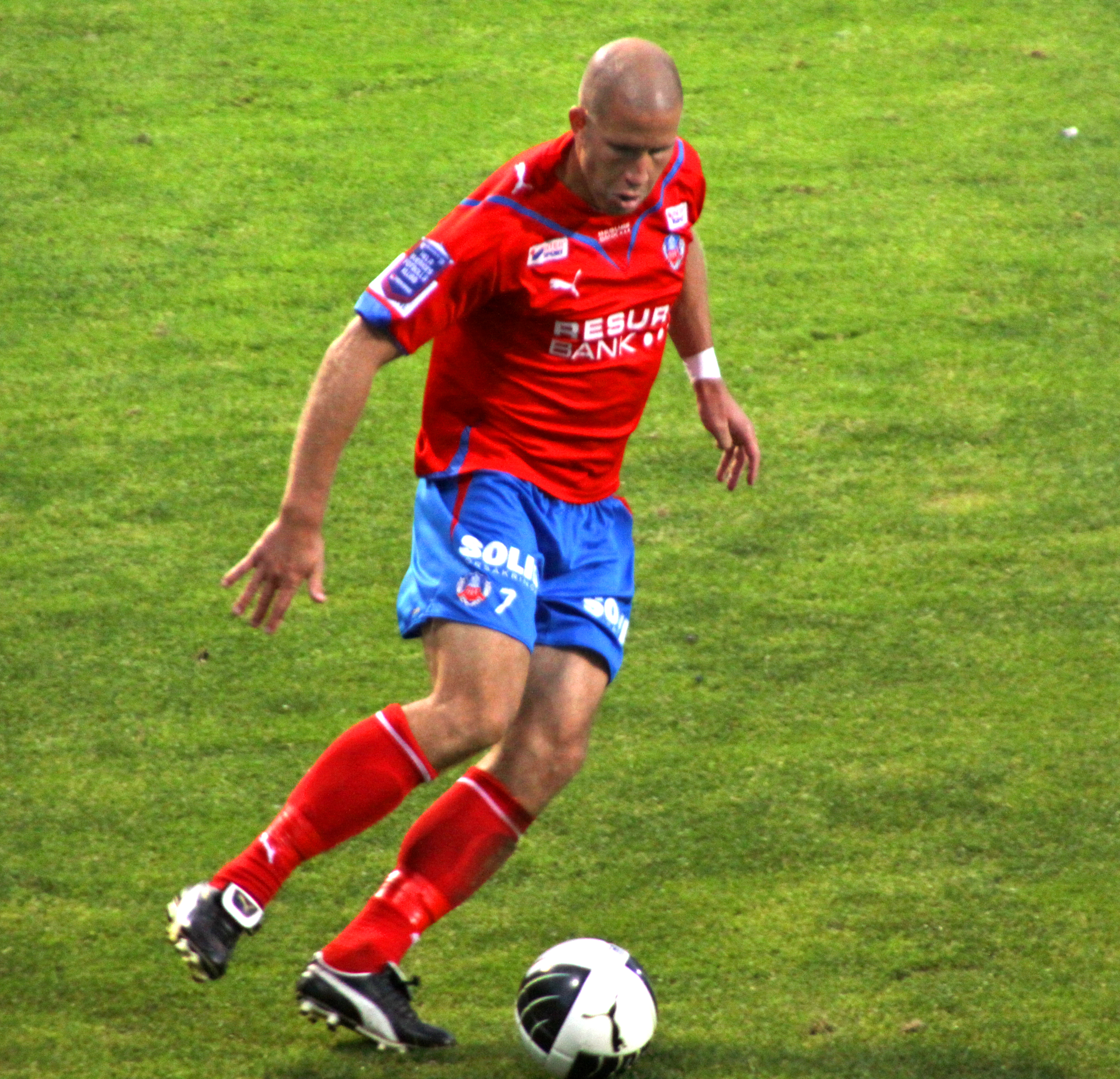
Mattias Lindström has made 224 league appearances for Helsingborgs IF.

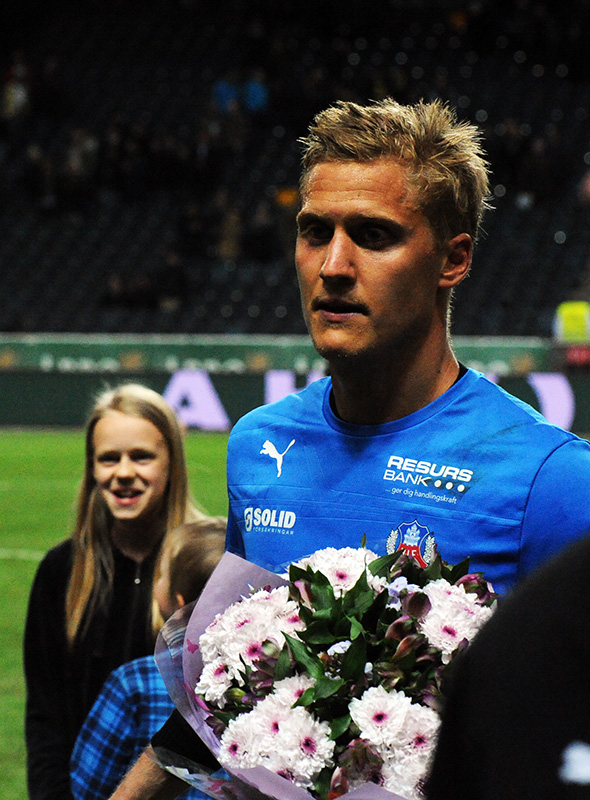
Pär Hansson has made 142 league appearances for Helsingborgs IF.

Name	Nationality	Position	Helsingborg career	League apps	League goals	Total apps	Total goals
Christoffer Andersson	Sweden	DF	1997–2003; 2007–	319	40		
Sven Andersson	Sweden	GK	1993–2001	233	0		
Mattias Lindström	Sweden	MF	1997–2004; 2010–	224	40		
Marcus Lantz	Sweden	MF	1994–1999; 2007–2010	167	16		
Pär Hansson	Sweden	GK	2005–	142	0		
Henrik Larsson	Sweden	FW	1992–1993; 2006–2009	140	88		
Álvaro Santos	Brazil	FW	2000–2003; 2011–	116	45		
