= Dustin AB =

Swedish IT company

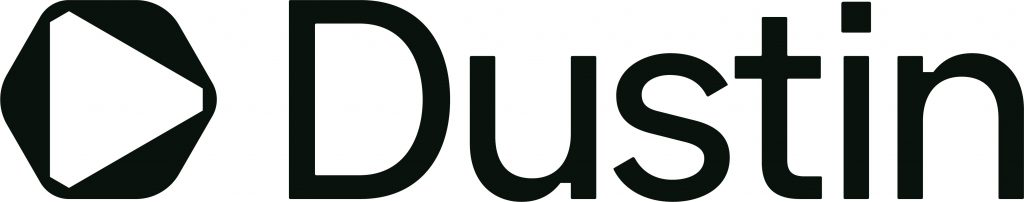
- Type: Aktiebolag
- Industry: IT Reseller
- Founded: 1984
- Key people: Bo Lundevall Founder, Ulla Lundevall Founder; Samuel Skott CEO
- Website: Dustin

Dustin is a Swedish company specializing in IT. It is active in the Nordics and in the Benelux.

Dustin had approximately 2,200 employees and a turnover of 23.6 billion Swedish kronor in the fiscal year of 2022/2023. The company was listed on the Stockholm Stock Exchange in 2015.

Dustin was founded by the couple Bo and Ulla Lundevall in 1984 as a side business in a zoo shop in the Stockholm suburb Farsta selling computer accessories such as colored diskettes via mail order. In 1995, Dustin started selling products via the internet. Dustin was acquired in 2006 by the risk capital company Altor Equity Partners. Dustin Group was listed on the Stockholm Stock Exchange in 2015.

In 2004, the subsidiary company Dustin Home was founded, which is aimed at private individuals. Before that, the Dustin brand was aimed at both private individuals and companies. In 2007, Dustin acquired the companies TCM and Computerstore A/S.

In 2008, Dustin Home was established in Denmark, in 2009 in Norway and in 2016 in Finland.

In 2012, IT-Hantverkarna was acquired by Dustin. and Best Office and Norsk Data Senter (NDS). In 2013, Finnish Businessforum was acquired. In 2015 acquisition of Commsec in Sweden and Resolute in Finland and in 2016 acquisition of Swedish Idenet and Norwegian IKT Gruppen. In 2017, Norwegian companies Core Services and Purit were acquired. Norriqs, a Danish company, and Saldab IT AB, a Swedish company, were also acquired in the same year. In 2018 and 2022, Dustin expanded to the Netherlands and Belgium through the acquisition of Centralpoint and Vincere Groep. Ownership of Dustin has gradually shifted to Axel Johnson AB, which since 2024 owns over 50% of Dustin's shares. A major reorganization was announced in 2024 after the company's share value had dropped by over 90% since late 2021.

In 2026, it experienced a severe data breach and was forced to shut down its online services. Following the breach, the company's share value dropped to a 95% decline over the past five years, while the workforce shrunk to approximately 1,800 employees.

== Dustin Financial Services AB ==
Dustin Financial Services AB was founded in 2007 as a subsidiary of Dustin. In 2015, it was sold to De Lage Landen Finance.
