= Andreas Thomsson =

Swedish football manager

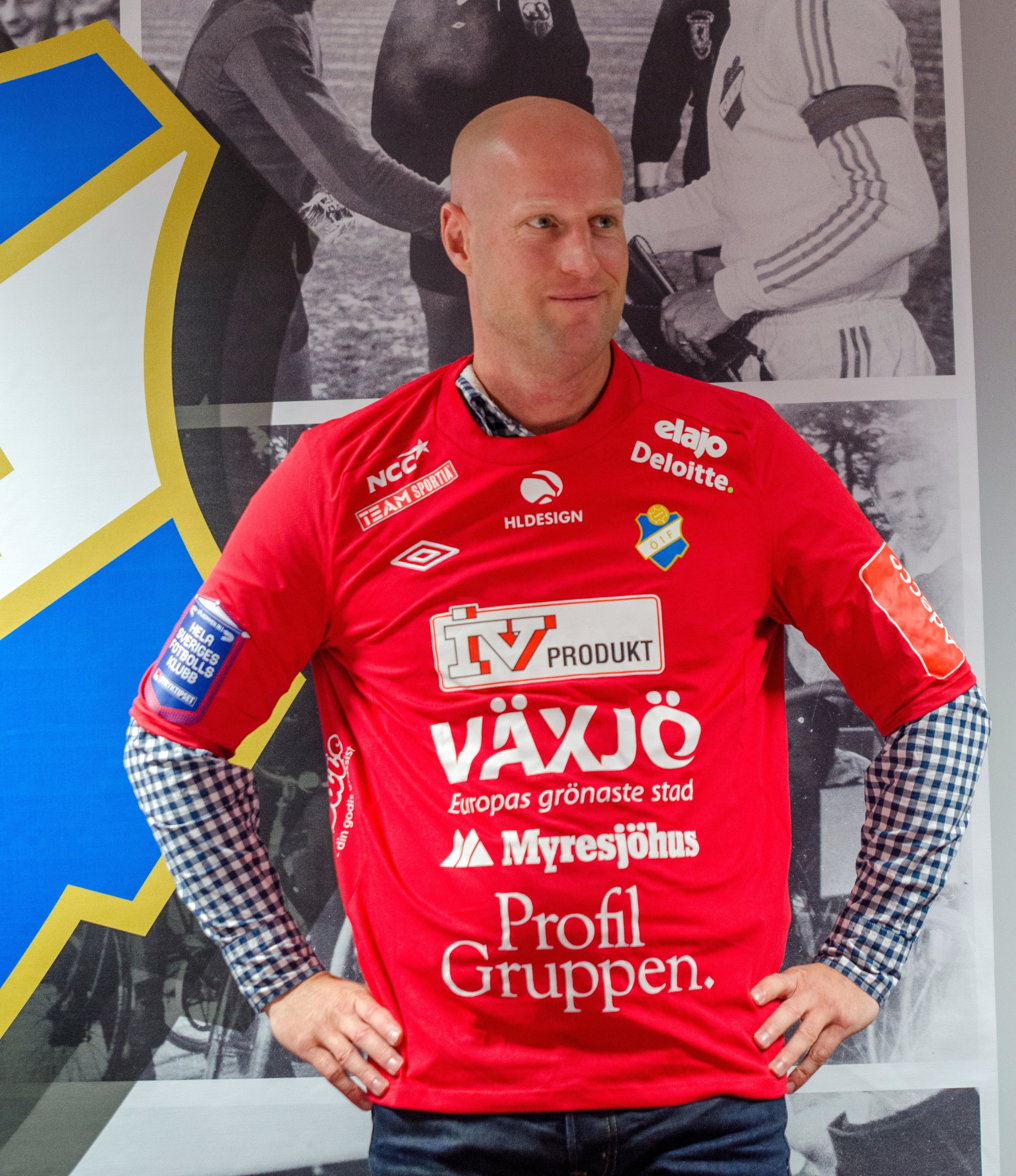
- Andreas Thomsson trying on his new team Östers' kit.

Personal information
- Full name: Andreas Thomsson
- Date of birth: 27 May 1971 (age 55)
- Place of birth: Kalmar, Sweden
- Position: Forward

Team information
- Current team: Östers IF (manager)

Youth career
- Mörbylånga GoIF

Senior career*
Years	Team	Apps	(Gls)
1990–1993	Kalmar FF	43	(8)
1994–1996	Färjestadens GoIF		
1997–2000	Kalmar FF	86	(13)
2001	Sandefjord	18	(3)
2002–2004	Åtvidabergs FF	60	(6)
Total		207	(30)

Managerial career
- 2004–2005: Linköpings FF
- 2006–2010: Åtvidabergs FF (assistant manager)
- 2010–2012: Åtvidabergs FF
- 2013: Östers IF
- 2014: FC Linköping City
- 2017: Åtvidabergs FF
- * Club domestic league appearances and goals

Andreas Thomsson (born 27 May 1971) is a Swedish football manager who most recently managed Åtvidabergs FF. He previously managed Östers IF and FC Linköping City.
