= Roar Hansen =

Swedish football manager

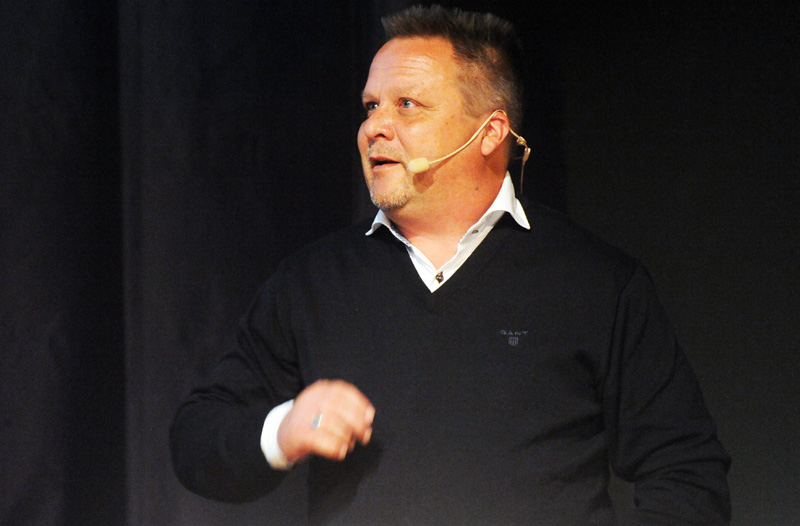

Personal information
- Full name: Roar Magne Hansen
- Date of birth: 28 February 1966 (age 60)
- Place of birth: Stidsvig, Sweden
- Height: 1.73 m (5 ft 8 in)

Team information
- Current team: Eskilsminne IF (Head coach)

Senior career*
Years	Team	Apps	(Gls)
- Tvärby IF
- Stidsvigs IF
- Kvidinge IF
- Östra Ljungby IF

Managerial career
- 1993–1997: Klippans BIF
- 1998–2000: Helsingborgs Södra BIS
- 2001–2003: Högaborgs BK
- 2004–2005: Landskrona BoIS (assistant)
- 2006–2010: Ängelholms FF
- 2011–2012: Östers IF
- 2013–2014: Helsingborgs IF
- 2015–2017: Åtvidabergs FF
- 2018: IFK Värnamo
- 2019–2023: Ängelholms FF
- 2024: Ängelholms FF (Director of Football)
- 2024–2025: Varbergs BoIS
- 2026–: Eskilsminne IF
- * Club domestic league appearances and goals

Roar Hansen (born 28 February 1966) is a Swedish football manager in charge of Eskilsminne IF in the Swedish Division 1.

After a short playing career in the lower divisions he spent 18 years combining work at a factory with coaching various small local clubs before he finally became a Superettan manager in 2008 after winning promotion with Ängelholms FF.

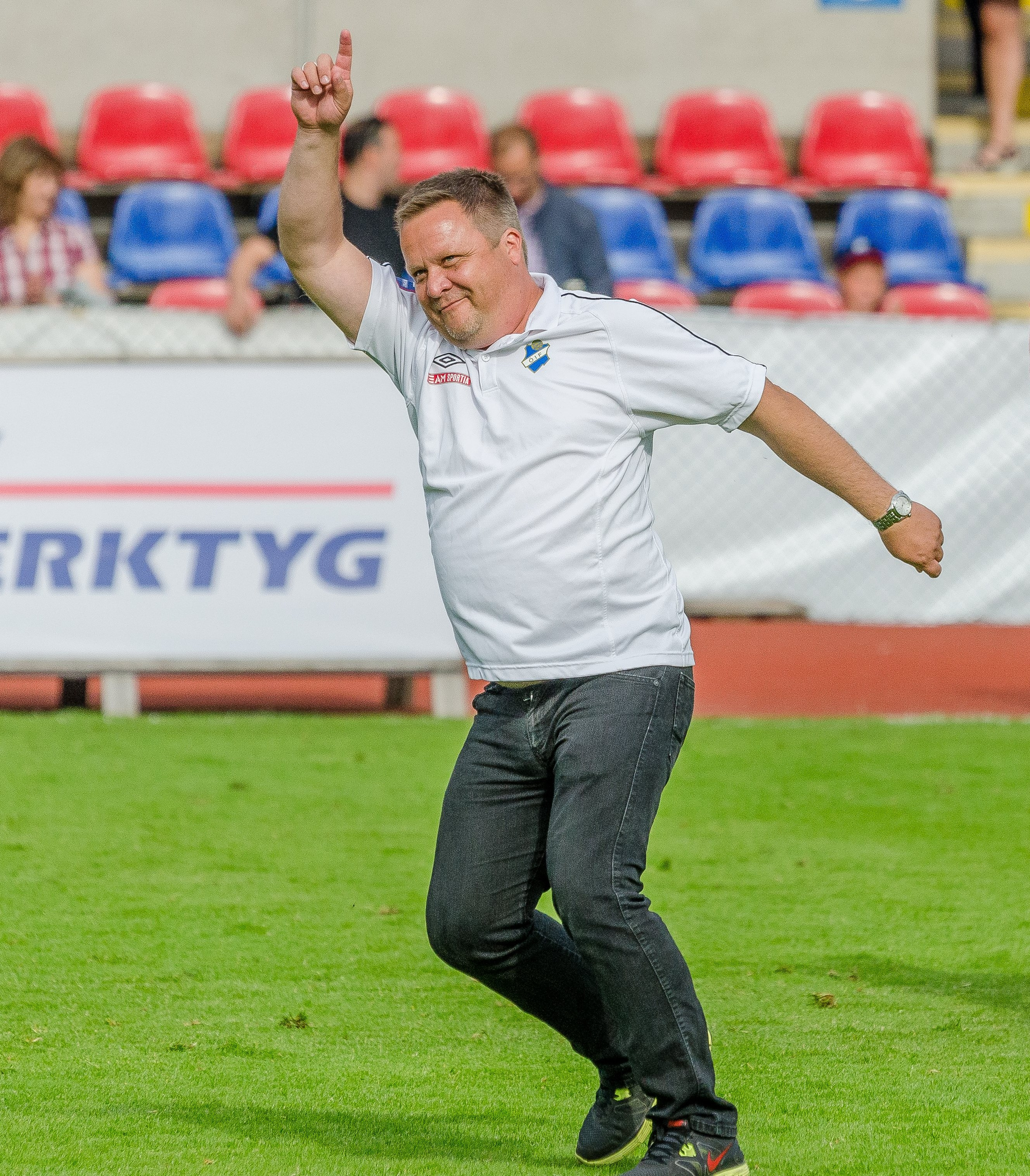
Hanson celebrating in 2012 when he was in charge of Östers IF.
