= Peter Swärdh =

Swedish footballer and manager

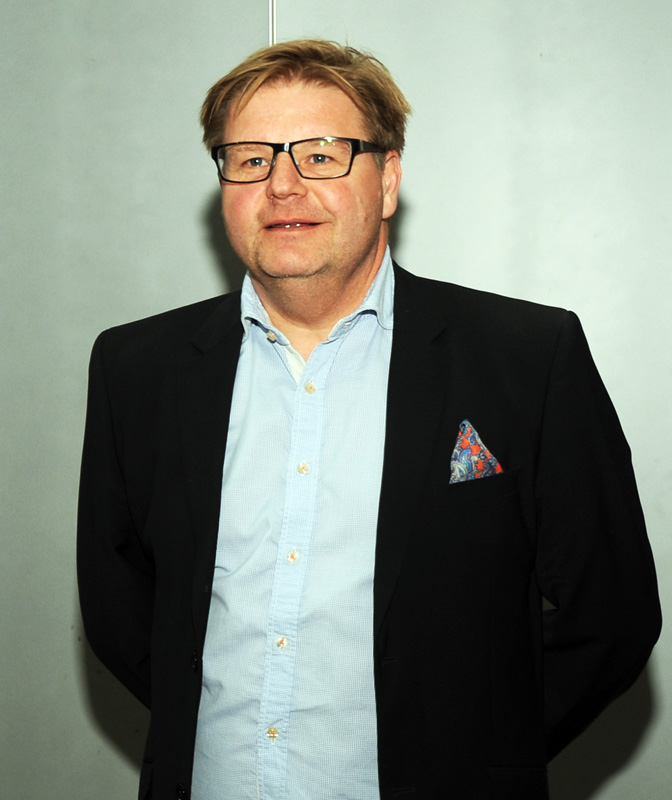

Personal information
- Full name: Rolf Peter Swärdh
- Date of birth: 27 February 1965 (age 61)
- Place of birth: Hässleholm, Sweden
- Position: Defender

Senior career*
Years	Team	Apps	(Gls)
1982–1991	IFK Hässleholm	156	(13)

Managerial career
- 1983–1991: IFK Hässleholm (youth coach)
- 1993–1995: IFK Hässleholm (assistant coach)
- 1995–1998: IFK Hässleholm
- 1999: Högaborgs BK
- 1999–2002: Helsingborgs IF (youth coach)
- 2002–2006: Helsingborgs IF
- 2007–2008: Åtvidabergs FF
- 2009–2012: Mjällby AIF
- 2012–2014: Åtvidabergs FF
- 2015–2017: Kalmar FF
- 2018: Landskrona BoIS (director of football)
- 2019: Trelleborgs FF
- * Club domestic league appearances and goals

Peter Swärdh (born 27 February 1965) is a Swedish football manager and former player.
