= Åtvidabergs FF =

Swedish football club

Åtvidaberg
- Full name: Åtvidabergs Fotbollförening
- Founded: 1 July 1907; 119 years ago (as Åtvidabergs IF)
- Ground: Kopparvallen, Åtvidaberg
- Capacity: 8,100
- Chairman: Martin Siggesjö
- Head coach: Dennis Bilanovic
- League: Ettan Södra
- 2026: Ettan Södra, 5th
- Website: www.atvidabergsff.se
Home colours	Away colours

Åtvidabergs Fotbollförening, also known simply as Åtvidabergs FF, Åtvidaberg, Åtvid or (especially locally) ÅFF, is a Swedish professional football club based in Åtvidaberg. The club is affiliated with Östergötlands Fotbollförbund and plays their home games at Kopparvallen. The club colours, reflected in their crest and kit, are blue and white. Formed on 1 July 1907 as Åtvidabergs IF, the club was most successful during the 1970s when they won two national championship titles and two national cup titles. With a population of around 7,000, Åtvidaberg was the smallest town ever to bring home a Swedish league title, until Mjällby in 2025. They currently play in Division 1.

== History ==
=== Initial rise through the divisions ===
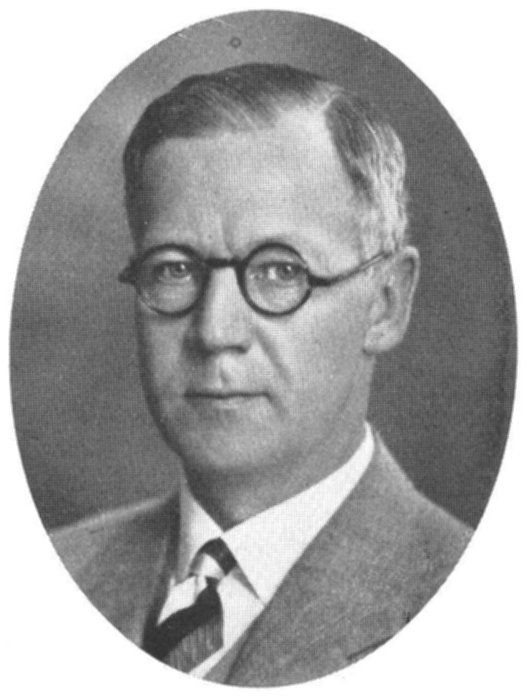
Elof Ericsson (1887–1961)

During the 1920s, the small town club Åtvidabergs IF played in the fifth tier of Swedish football. However, local businessman Elof Ericsson was determined to change this. He became chairman of the board and took the initiative of separating the different sections of the multisport club, thus forming a new club, Åtvidabergs FF, out of the football section. Through his company Facit, which employed a large portion of the small Åtvidaberg population, he was also able to increase the funding for the team.

Åtvidaberg became early forerunners with their strategy to scout players nationally instead of just locally. Since all players in Sweden at the time were amateurs, their ability to offer new signings a good job at the Facit factory made them an attractive club to play for. This, together with the hiring of foreign coaches like Kálmán Konrád, helped the club move up through the divisions, establishing them in the second tier and playing one year in Allsvenskan.

=== The peak of Åtvidaberg's success ===
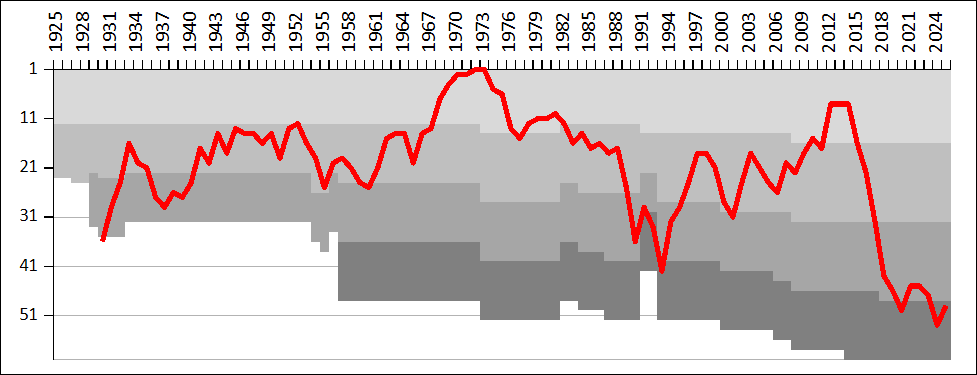
A chart showing the progress of Åtvidabergs FF through the swedish football league system. The different shades of gray represent league divisions.

The years that followed would prove to be Åtvidabergs FF's most successful ever. During this period, they recruited players like Ralf Edström, Roland Sandberg and Conny Torstensson.

In 1967, they were promoted to Allsvenskan and five years later they won the league for the first time ever and repeated the year after in 1973. Ironically, this golden age came at exactly the same time as the Facit company, which had enabled the success, struggled greatly and eventually was sold off to Electrolux.

=== New millennium revival ===
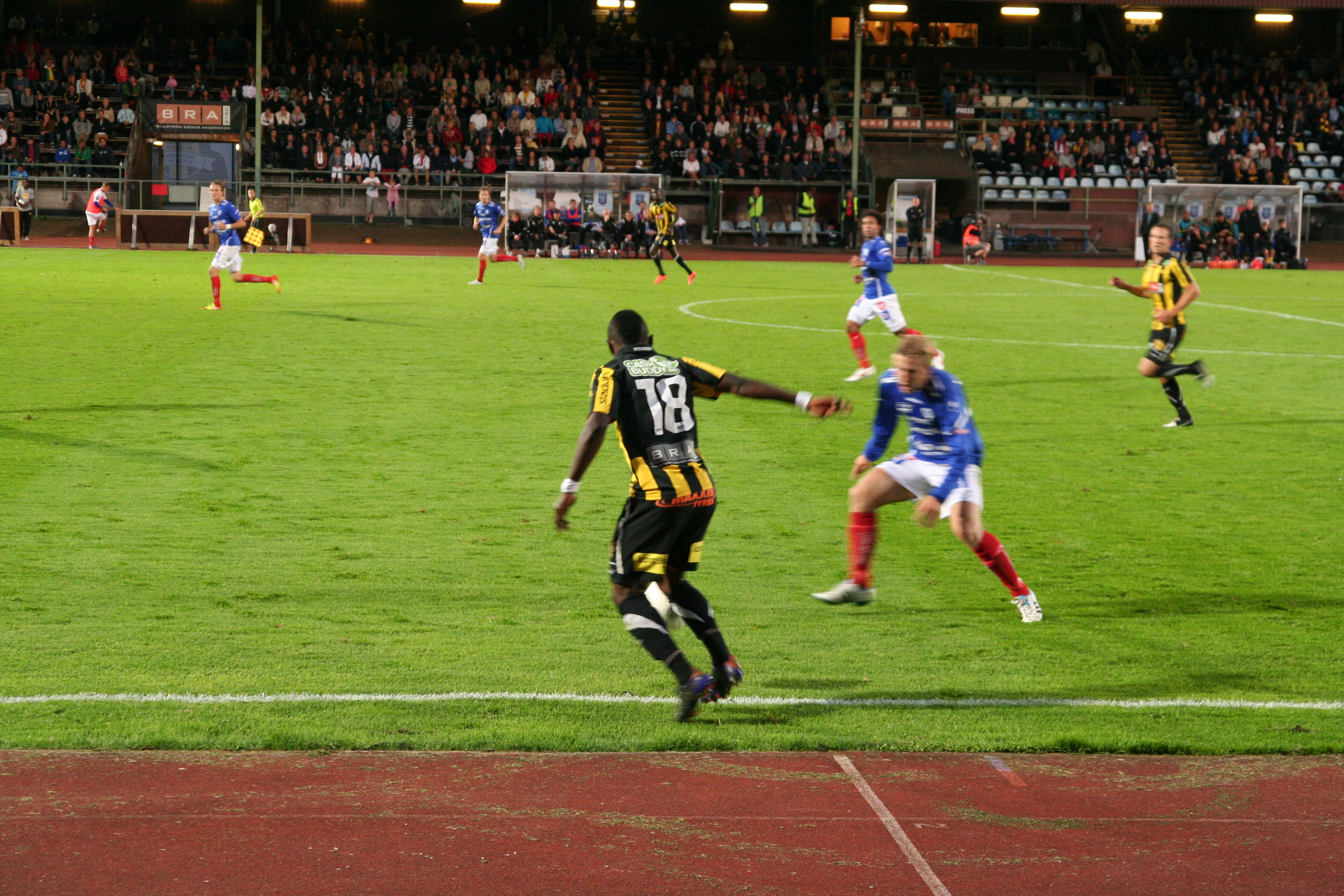
Åtvidaberg playing a game against BK Häcken in the 2012 Allsvenskan.

After struggling greatly in the 1990s and falling as low as the fourth tier with attendance numbers in the hundreds, Åtvidaberg had managed to climb back up to the second tier again by the start of the new millennium. In an effort to further strengthen their organization and finances, the club started a cooperation with reigning champions Djurgårdens IF in 2003. The deal also included a loan of several Djurgården players to Åtvidaberg. In 2005, the Djurgården chairman said that the team should move to the nearby city of Linköping, that did not have a club in the higher divisions. The proposal was met by a negative reaction from the Åtvidaberg supporters. The cooperation finally collapsed in 2006 when Åtvidaberg Municipality refused to cover any potential economic losses for Djurgården.

In the following years, Åtvidaberg finished in the top half of the Superettan table and finally in 2009 they were promoted back to Allsvenskan for the first time since 1982. They were relegated again but bounced back immediately and achieved an eighth-place finish in the 2012 Allsvenskan. During the upcoming seasons, Åtvidaberg finished mid-table in the top tier with the help of the three key players that long had stayed faithful with the club: goalkeeper Henrik Gustavsson (that made 487 league appearances between 1997 and 2015), central defender Daniel Hallingström (350 appearances and 29 goals between 1999–2000 and 2002–2015) and midfielder Kristian Bergström (489 appearances and 118 goals between 1992–1997 and 2004–2015). All three players retired after the 2015 season, as Åtvidaberg finished 16th and last in Allsvenskan and got relegated back to Superettan.

Two years later, in 2017, the club got relegated from Superettan to the third tier, Division 1.

== Players ==
=== First-team squad ===
As of 3 September 2026

Note: Flags indicate national team as defined under FIFA eligibility rules; some limited exceptions apply. Players may hold more than one non-FIFA nationality.

No.	Pos.	Nation	Player
1	GK	SWE	Hugo Claesson
2	DF	SWE	Anton Skogö
3	DF	SWE	Carl Thulin
4	DF	SWE	Tufve Östlund
5	DF	SWE	Ali Kachmar
6	DF	SWE	Markus Assarsson
7	MF	SWE	Adam Samuelsson
8	FW	SWE	Victor Kamf
9	FW	SWE	Haris Radetinac
11	FW	SWE	Adam Paakkari

No.	Pos.	Nation	Player
15	FW	SWE	Albin Bergström
16	MF	SWE	Joel Hedström
18	MF	SWE	Jesper Lindvall
19	FW	SWE	Lucas Brahim
20	FW	SWE	Erik Grandelius
21	MF	SWE	Srdjan Sotra
22	DF	SWE	Hannes Lennartsson
23	MF	SWE	David Ström
24	DF	SWE	Joshua Sivertsen
30	GK	SWE	Kevin Eriksson

=== Youth players in use ===
Note: Flags indicate national team as defined under FIFA eligibility rules; some limited exceptions apply. Players may hold more than one non-FIFA nationality.

No.	Pos.	Nation	Player

== Management ==
=== Technical staff ===
As of 1 July 2023

Name	Role		
(Sweden) Anders Bååth	Head coach	(Sweden) Henrik Gustavsson	Assistant coach
(Sweden) Anders Ale	Goalkeeping coach		
(Sweden) Pontus Hydén	Fitness coach		
(Sweden) Bengt Holmudd	Masseur		
(Sweden) Kalle Torvaldsson	Club doctor		

== Achievements ==
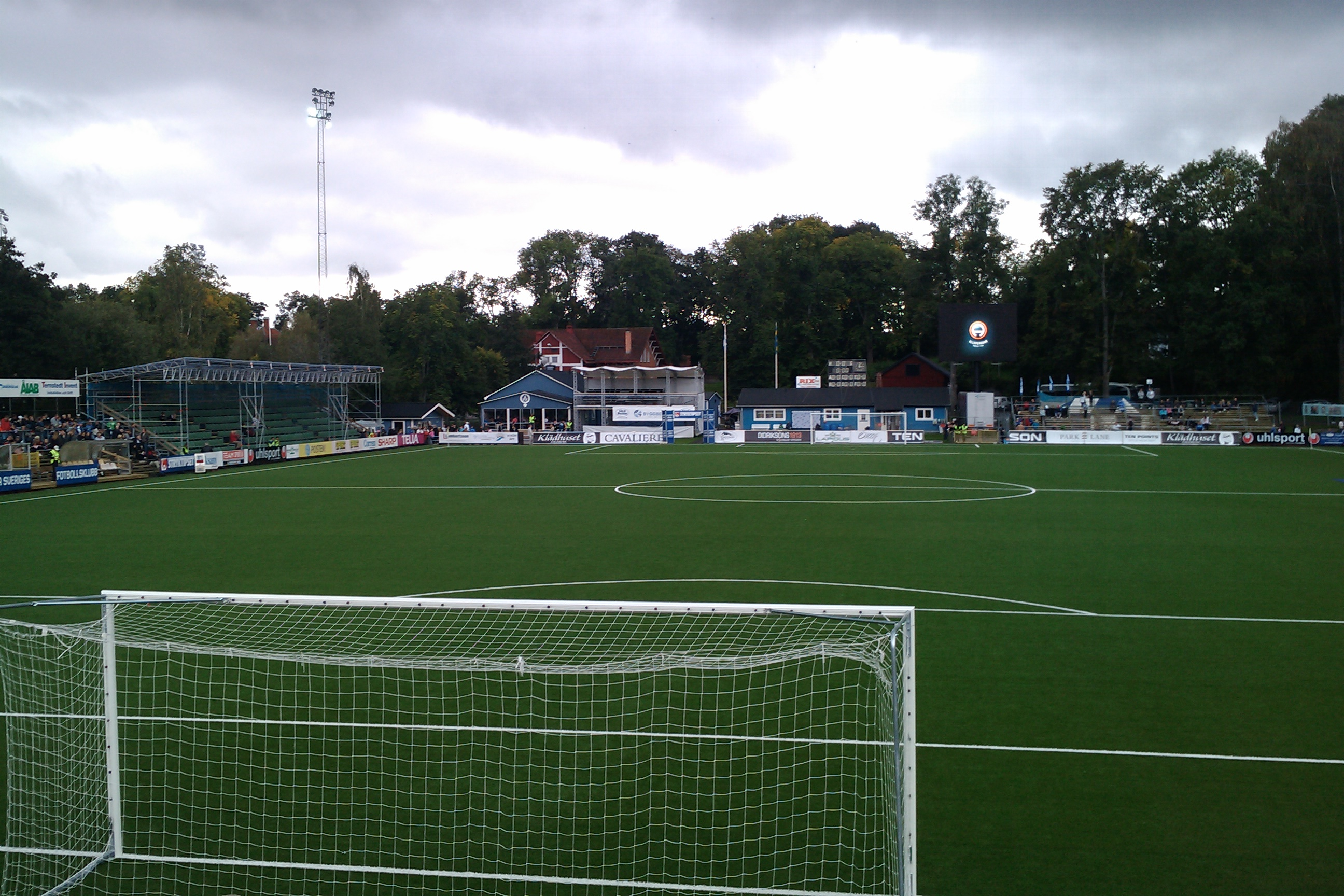
Kopparvallen before the 2011–2012 stadium rebuild.

- Swedish Champions (Note: The title of "Swedish Champions" has been awarded to the winner of four different competitions over the years. Between 1896 and 1925 the title was awarded to the winner of Svenska Mästerskapet, a stand-alone cup tournament. No club were given the title between 1926 and 1930 even though the first-tier league Allsvenskan was played. In 1931 the title was reinstated and awarded to the winner of Allsvenskan. Between 1982 and 1990 a play-off in cup format was held at the end of the league season to decide the champions. After the play-off format in 1991 and 1992 the title was decided by the winner of Mästerskapsserien, an additional league after the end of Allsvenskan. Since the 1993 season the title has once again been awarded to the winner of Allsvenskan.)
  - Winners (2): 1972, 1973

=== League ===
- Allsvenskan:
  - Winners (2): 1972, 1973
  - Runners-up (2): 1970, 1971
- Superettan:
  - Winners (1): 2011
  - Runners-up (1): 2009

=== Cups ===
- Svenska Cupen:
  - Winners (2): 1969–70, 1970–71
  - Runners-up (4): 1946, 1972–73, 1978–79, 2005

== Managers ==
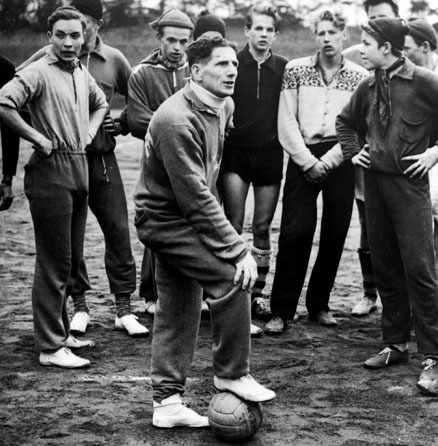
Englishman George Raynor also managed clubs like Juventus and Lazio as well as the 1958 FIFA World Cup Swed national team who finished runners-up.

- (Hungary) Kálmán Konrád (1942–1947)
- (Sweden) Erik Almgren (1948)
- (Hungary) József Nagy (1948–1952)
- (England) George Raynor (1952–1954)
- (Austria) Karl Durspekt (1956–1957)
- (Spain) Antonio Durán (1960–1963)
- (Sweden) Bengt Gustavsson (1966–1970)
- (Sweden) Sven-Agne Larsson (1971–1972)
- (Sweden) Ottó Dombos (1973–1974)
- (Sweden) Ingvar Svensson (1977–1979)
- (Sweden) Björn Westerberg (Jan 1979 – Dec 1982)
- (Sweden) Bo-Leine Larsson
- (Sweden) Conny Torstensson (1986)
- (Sweden) Håkan Stenbäck (1989)
- (Sweden) Mats "Tott" Karlsson (1997 – 1999)
- (Sweden) Jörgen Augustsson (2000)
- (Sweden) Steve Creutz & Hans "Lerdala" Andersson (2000–2003)
- (Sweden) Kent Karlsson (2004 – 2006)
- (Sweden) Peter Swärdh (2007 – 2008)
- (Sweden) Daniel Wiklund (2009)
- (Sweden) Andreas Thomsson (2010 – 2012)
- (Sweden) Peter Swärdh (2013 – 2014)
- (Sweden) Roar Hansen (2015 – 2017)
- (Sweden) Andreas Thomsson (2017)
- (Sweden) Daniel Hallingström & Pontus Hydén (2018)
- (Sweden) Rickard Johansson (2018 – 2019)
- (Sweden) Tor-Arne Fredheim (2019)
- (Sweden) Jesper Ny (2019 – 2021)
- (Sweden) Rickard Larsén (2022)
- (Sweden) Jan Stahre (2022)
- (Sweden) Anders Bååth (2023)
- (Sweden) Robert Axelsson (2024 – 2025)
- (Sweden) Dennis Bilanovic (2025 – present)
