= 2010 IF Elfsborg season =

IF Elfsborg
2010 season
- Manager: Magnus Haglund
- Allsvenskan: 4th
- Europa League: Play-off round
- Svenska Cupen: Last 16
- Top goalscorer: Denni Avdić (19)

IF Elfsborg had another season where they stayed in the top four for the fifth consecutive season. Being tipped for title glory, Elfsborg was nowhere near such a feat, but thanks to Denni Avdić and his sensational season, scoring 19 league goals a European qualification was granted once more. In the 2010-11 edition of UEFA Europa League.

== Squad ==
=== Goalkeepers ===
- (Australia) (Croatia) Ante Čović
- (Denmark) Jesper Christiansen
- (Sweden) Joakim Wulff

=== Defenders ===
- (Sweden) Mathias Florén
- (Sweden) Johan Sjöberg
- (Sweden) Johan Karlsson
- (Sweden) Martin Andersson
- (Sweden) Jon Jönsson
- (Sweden) Anders Wikström
- (Sweden) Teddy Lučić

=== Midfielders ===
- (Finland) Jari Ilola
- (Sweden) Anders Svensson
- (Sweden) Martin Ericsson
- (Sweden) Daniel Mobaeck
- (Sweden) Daniel Nordmark
- (Sweden) Johan Larsson
- (Sweden) Niklas Hult
- (Sweden) Stefan Ishizaki
- (Sweden) Elmin Kurbegović

=== Attackers ===
- (Sweden) Denni Avdić
- (Sweden) Amadou Jawo
- (England) James Keene
- (Sweden) Fredrik Berglund

== Allsvenskan ==
=== Matches ===
- Gefle-Elfsborg 0-0
- Elfsborg-Halmstad 6-0
- 1-0 Johan Larsson 13'
- 2-0 Johan Larsson 28'
- 3-0 James Keene 59'
- 4-0 James Keene 65'
- 5-0 Fredrik Berglund 87'
- 6-0 Denni Avdić 89'
- Kalmar FF-Elfsborg 2-2
- 1-0 Ricardo Santos 3'
- 1-1 Daniel Mobaeck 16'
- 1-2 Daniel Nordmark 43'
- 2-2 Ricardo Santos 90'
- Elfsborg-Häcken 0-0
- Helsingborg-Elfsborg 2-1
- 1-0 Ardian Gashi 47'
- 1-1 Denni Avdić 61'
- 2-1 Marcus Holgersson 63'
- Elfsborg-Djurgården 3-1
- 0-1 Johan Oremo 4' (pen.)
- 1-1 Denni Avdić 17'
- 2-1 Denni Avdić 38'
- 3-1 Martin Ericsson 56'
- IFK Göteborg-Elfsborg 5-1
- 0-1 Martin Ericsson 5'
- 1-1 Sebastian Eriksson 20'
- 2-1 Hjálmar Jónsson 41'
- 3-1 Jakob Johansson 81'
- 4-1 Jakob Johansson 87'
- 5-1 Robin Söder 90'
- Elfsborg-Trelleborg 4-1
- 0-1 Joakim Sjöhage 5'
- 1-1 Emir Bajrami 18'
- 2-1 Denni Avdić 29'
- 3-1 Denni Avdić 64'
- 4-1 Johan Larsson 80'
- Elfsborg-Brommapojkarna 1-0
- 1-0 Johan Larsson 35'
- Åtvidaberg-Elfsborg 1-1
- 1-0 Haris Radetinač 27'
- 1-1 Denni Avdić 41'
- Elfsborg-Malmö FF 2-2
- 0-1 Jimmy Durmaz 26'
- 0-2 Wílton Figueiredo 35'
- 1-2 Denni Avdić 36'
- 2-2 Denni Avdić 86'
- Mjällby-Elfsborg 2-0
- 1-0 Tobias Grahn 46'
- 2-0 David Löfquist 83'
- Elfsborg-AIK 4-0
- 1-0 Denni Avdić 5'
- 2-0 Martin Ericsson 20'
- 3-0 Denni Avdić 55' (pen.)
- 4-0 Amadou Jawo 63'
- GAIS-Elfsborg 0-2
- 0-1 Emir Bajrami 19'
- 0-2 Denni Avdić 39'
- Elfsborg-Örebro 3-3
- 0-1 Patrik Anttonen 7'
- 1-1 Martin Ericsson 17'
- 2-1 Denni Avdić 50'
- 2-2 Roni Porokara 58'
- 3-2 Stefan Ishizaki 83'
- 3-3 Astrit Ajdarević 90'
- Örebro-Elfsborg 3-0
- 1-0 Astrit Ajdarević 44'
- 2-0 Astrit Ajdarević 56'
- 3-0 Samuel Wowoah 80'
- Elfsborg-Gefle 1-0
- 1-0 Stefan Ishizaki 24'
- Halmstad-Elfsborg 1-3
- 0-1 Stefan Ishizaki 4'
- 0-2 Denni Avdić 8'
- 0-3 Denni Avdić 45'
- 1-3 Emir Kujović 81'
- Elfsborg-Kalmar FF 4-1
- 1-0 Mathias Florén 2'
- 1-1 Ricardo Santos 5'
- 2-1 Johan Larsson 56'
- 3-1 Denni Avdić 58'
- 4-1 James Keene 62'
- Häcken-Elfsborg 1-1
- 1-0 Jonas Henriksson 90'
- 1-1 Denni Avdić 90'
- Malmö FF-Elfsborg 1-0
- 1-0 Daniel Andersson 79'
- Elfsborg-Mjällby 2-0
- 1-0 Martin Ericsson 44' (pen.)
- 2-0 Daniel Nordmark 90'
- Trelleborg-Elfsborg 1-1
- 1-0 Kristian Haynes 46'
- 1-1 Denni Avdić 67'
- Elfsborg-IFK Göteborg 1-1
- 0-1 Tobias Hysén 5'
- 1-1 Jon Jönsson 54'
- Brommapojkarna-Elfsborg 2-2
- 0-1 Jon Jönsson 6'
- 1-1 Sinan Ayrancı 43'
- 2-1 Pontus Segerström 65' (pen.)
- 2-2 Niklas Hult 78'
- Elfsborg-Åtvidaberg 4-1
- 0-1 Haris Radetinač 28'
- 1-1 Stefan Ishizaki 48'
- 2-1 Stefan Ishizaki 62'
- 3-1 Johan Larsson 77'
- 4-1 James Keene 84'
- Elfsborg-Helsingborg 1-3
- 0-1 May Mahlangu 11'
- 1-1 Mathias Florén 45'
- 1-2 Erik Sundin 58'
- 1-3 Erik Sundin 73'
- Djurgården-Elfsborg 4-4
- 1-0 Prince Ikpe Ekong 14'
- 1-1 Prince Ikpe Ekong 31' (o.g.)
- 1-2 Stefan Ishizaki 50'
- 2-2 Kennedy Igboananike 61'
- 2-3 Amadou Jawo 64'
- 3-3 Petter Gustafsson 73'
- 3-4 Denni Avdić 75'
- 4-4 Kennedy Igboananike 90'
- AIK-Elfsborg 2-0
- 1-0 Mohamed Bangura 51'
- 2-0 Viktor Lundberg 75'
- Elfsborg-GAIS 1-0
- 1-0 Martin Andersson 84'
