= 2008 IF Elfsborg season =

IF Elfsborg
2008 season
- Manager: Magnus Haglund
- Allsvenskan: 2nd
- UEFA Cup: 2nd round
- Svenska Cupen: Quarter-final
- Intertoto Cup: Progression
- Top goalscorer: Stefan Ishizaki (8); Fredrik Berglund (8)

IF Elfsborg had their best points average season, in spite of not repeating its 2006 title. Finishing just one point adrift of Kalmar FF, Elfsborg had cemented its place as one of the top Swedish sides, being further boosted by Anders Svensson turning down a lucrative offer from Shaktar Donetsk during the course of the season.

== Squad ==
=== Goalkeepers ===
- (Sweden) Johan Wiland
- (Sweden) Abbas Hassan
- (Sweden) Jesper Hansen

=== Defenders ===
- (Sweden) Mathias Florén
- (Sweden) Johan Sjöberg
- (Sweden) Johan Karlsson
- (Sweden) Martin Andersson
- (Sweden) Teddy Lučić
- (Sweden) Andreas Augustsson
- (Sweden) Markus Falk Olander
- (Sweden) Marcus Översjö

=== Midfielders ===
- (Sweden) Anders Svensson
- (Iceland) Helgi Daníelsson
- (Finland) Jari Ilola
- (Sweden) Daniel Mobaeck
- (Sweden) Stefan Ishizaki
- (Sweden) Jesper Florén
- (Sweden) Daniel Nordmark
- (Sweden) Emir Bajrami
- (Sweden) Elmin Kurbegović

=== Attackers ===
- (Sweden) Lasse Nilsson
- (Sweden) Denni Avdić
- (Sweden) Joakim Sjöhage
- (England) James Keene
- (Sweden) Fredrik Berglund

== Allsvenskan ==
=== Matches ===
- GAIS-Elfsborg 1-1
- 0-1 Stefan Ishizaki 83'
- 1-1 Fredrik Lundgren 88'
- Elfsborg-AIK 3-0
- 1-0 Stefan Ishizaki 38'
- 2-0 Joakim Sjöhage 43'
- 3-0 Denni Avdić 54'
- Malmö FF-Elfsborg 1-1
- 0-1 Emir Bajrami 18'
- 1-1 Guillermo Molins 33'
- Elfsborg-Örebro 0-0
- Ljungskile-Elfsborg 1-0
- 1-0 Martin Smedberg 87'
- Elfsborg-GIF Sundsvall 2-0
- 1-0 Daniel Mobaeck 9'
- 2-0 Fredrik Berglund 74'
- Hammarby-Elfsborg 0-0
- Elfsborg-Kalmar FF 1-0
- 1-0 Fredrik Berglund 3'
- Elfsborg-Helsingborg 1-0
- 1-0 Daniel Mobaeck 33'
- Trelleborg-Elfsborg 0-2
- 0-1 Stefan Ishizaki 13'
- 0-2 Youssef Fakhro 29' (o.g.)
- Elfsborg-IFK Göteborg 3-0
- 1-0 Fredrik Berglund 68'
- 2-0 Fredrik Berglund 74'
- 3-0 Stefan Ishizaki 90'
- Djurgården-Elfsborg 0-2
- 0-1 Anders Svensson 1'
- 0-2 Stefan Ishizaki 14' (pen.)
- Elfsborg-Gefle 0-1
- 0-1 Hasse Berggren 67'
- Halmstad-Elfsborg 1-2
- 0-1 Emir Bajrami 30'
- 0-2 Fredrik Berglund 49'
- 1-2 Sebastian Johansson 90'
- Elfsborg-IFK Norrköping 3-0
- 1-0 Emir Bajrami 2'
- 2-0 Lasse Nilsson 39'
- 3-0 Stefan Ishizaki 72'
- IFK Norrköping-Elfsborg 0-1
- 0-1 Denni Avdić 83'
- Elfsborg-GAIS 1-0
- 1-0 Teddy Lučić 43'
- AIK-Elfsborg 0-2
- 0-1 Stefan Ishizaki 24'
- 0-2 Fredrik Berglund 31'
- Örebro-Elfsborg 2-0
- 1-0 Robin Staaf 32'
- 2-0 Eric Bassombeng 78'
- Elfsborg-Ljungskile 4-0
- 1-0 Denni Avdić 7'
- 2-0 Stefan Ishizaki 59'
- 3-0 Denni Avdić 75'
- 4-0 James Keene 90'
- GIF Sundsvall-Elfsborg 0-0
- Elfsborg-Malmö FF 4-0
- 1-0 Stefan Ishizaki 11'
- 2-0 Daniel Mobaeck 45'
- 3-0 Emir Bajrami 67'
- 4-0 James Keene 73'
- Elfsborg-Hammarby 1-0
- 1-0 Christian Traoré 49' (o.g.)
- Kalmar FF-Elfsborg 2-1
- 1-0 Viktor Elm 45'
- 2-0 Viktor Elm 82'
- 2-1 Joakim Sjöhage 90'
- Helsingborg-Elfsborg 2-2
- 1-0 René Makondele 28'
- 2-0 Henrik Larsson 42'
- 2-1 Teddy Lučić 53'
- 2-2 Fredrik Berglund 71'
- Elfsborg-Trelleborg 4-1
- 1-0 Daniel Mobaeck 21'
- 1-1 Fredrik Jensen 35'
- 2-1 Johan Karlsson 54'
- 3-1 Johan Karlsson 71'
- 4-1 Lasse Nilsson 79'
- IFK Göteborg-Elfsborg 5-2
- 0-1 Johan Karlsson 11'
- 1-1 Gustaf Svensson 18'
- 2-1 Pontus Wernbloom 48'
- 3-1 Niclas Alexandersson 60'
- 4-1 Jakob Johansson 75'
- 5-1 Pontus Wernbloom 85'
- 5-2 Daniel Nordmark 89'
- Elfsborg-Djurgården 1-0
- 1-0 James Keene 49'
- Elfsborg-Halmstad 3-0
- 1-0 Fredrik Berglund 74'
- 2-0 Emir Bajrami 78'
- 3-0 Lasse Nilsson 82'
- Gefle-Elfsborg 1-2
- 0-1 Martin Andersson 21'
- 0-2 Johan Karlsson 54'
- 1-2 Hasse Berggren 90'

=== Topscorers ===
- (Sweden) Stefan Ishizaki 8
- (Sweden) Fredrik Berglund 8
- (Sweden) Emir Bajrami 5
- (Sweden) Johan Karlsson 4
- (Sweden) Denni Avdić 4
- (Sweden) Daniel Mobaeck 3
- (England) James Keene 3

== Sources ==
Soccerway - IF Elfsborg results
