= 2009 IF Elfsborg season =

IF Elfsborg
2009 season
- Manager: Magnus Haglund
- Allsvenskan: 3rd
- Europa League: Play-off round
- Svenska Cupen: Last 16
- Top goalscorer: James Keene (8)

IF Elfsborg had another decent season, finishing in third of Allsvenskan, and having a decent run in the UEFA Europa League, knocking Braga out, before losing to Lazio prior to the group stage. Having been tipped for domestic glory, heavy defeats to IFK Göteborg and Malmö FF within a couple of weeks meant the team got to far behind to mount a serious challenge.

== Squad ==
=== Goalkeepers ===
- (Australia) (Croatia) Ante Čović
- (Sweden) Joakim Wulff

=== Defenders ===
- (Sweden) Mathias Florén
- (Sweden) Johan Karlsson
- (Sweden) Martin Andersson
- (Sweden) Anders Wikström
- (Sweden) Teddy Lučić
- (Sweden) Daniel Mobaeck

=== Midfielders ===
- (Iceland) Helgi Daníelsson
- (Finland) Jari Ilola
- (Sweden) Anders Svensson
- (Sweden) Martin Ericsson
- (Sweden) Jesper Florén
- (Sweden) Daniel Nordmark
- (Sweden) Emir Bajrami
- (Sweden) Niklas Hult
- (Sweden) Stefan Ishizaki

=== Attackers ===
- (Sweden) Denni Avdić
- (Sweden) Amadou Jawo
- (England) James Keene
- (Sweden) Joel Johansson
- (Sweden) Henrik Svedberg

== Allsvenskan ==
=== Matches ===
- Elfsborg-Hammarby 1-1
- 0-1 Erik Johansson 14'
- 1-1 Stefan Ishizaki 48' (pen.)
- Örebro-Elfsborg 0-1
- 0-1 Joel Johansson 84'
- Elfsborg-Kalmar FF 1-1
- 1-0 Emir Bajrami 31'
- 1-1 Daniel Mendes 88'
- Gefle-Elfsborg 1-2
- 1-0 Hasse Berggren 20'
- 1-1 Mathias Florén 44'
- 1-2 Anders Svensson 90'
- Elfsborg-Malmö FF 1-0
- 1-0 Mathias Florén 30'
- Brommapojkarna-Elfsborg 1-1
- 1-0 Olof Guterstam 9'
- 1-1 James Keene 29'
- Elfsborg-IFK Göteborg 2-0
- 1-0 Daniel Mobaeck 31'
- 2-0 Emir Bajrami 54'
- GAIS-Elfsborg 1-1
- 0-1 Anders Svensson 37'
- 1-1 Mattias Lindström 76'
- Elfsborg-Halmstad 4-0
- 1-0 Daniel Nordmark 11'
- 2-0 James Keene 20'
- 3-0 James Keene 44'
- 4-0 Denni Avdić 45'
- AIK-Elfsborg 0-0
- Elfsborg-Trelleborg 1-0
- 1-0 Daniel Nordmark 59'
- Häcken-Elfsborg 1-1
- 1-0 Mathias Ranégie 26'
- 1-1 Martin Ericsson 37'
- Elfsborg-Örgryte 3-0
- 1-0 Stefan Ishizaki 29' (pen.)
- 2-0 James Keene 39'
- 3-0 Emir Bajrami 87'
- Helsingborg-Elfsborg 3-2
- 1-0 Christoffer Andersson 12'
- 2-0 Rasmus Jönsson 48'
- 2-1 Emir Bajrami 52'
- 2-2 Emir Bajrami 63'
- 3-2 Rasmus Jönsson 70'
- Djurgården-Elfsborg 1-2
- 0-1 Emir Bajrami 18'
- 1-1 Kebba Ceesay 55'
- 1-2 Teddy Lučić 81'
- Elfsborg-Djurgården 3-1
- 0-1 Daniel Sjölund 40' (pen.)
- 1-1 Denni Avdić 79'
- 2-1 Daniel Nordmark 80'
- 3-1 Petter Gustafsson 90' (o.g.)
- Kalmar FF-Elfsborg 3-1
- 1-0 David Elm 35'
- 1-1 Helgi Daníelsson 38'
- 2-1 Rasmus Elm 61'
- 3-1 Abiola Dauda 88'
- Elfsborg-Gefle 2-3
- 1-0 Stefan Ishizaki 11' (pen.)
- 1-1 Yannick Bapupa 49'
- 1-2 Yannick Bapupa 65'
- 1-3 Jonas Lantto 81'
- 2-3 Stefan Ishizaki 87'
- Hammarby-Elfsborg 2-3
- 0-1 Stefan Ishizaki 18'
- 1-1 Andreas Dahl 21' (pen.)
- 1-2 Anders Svensson 41'
- 1-3 Stefan Ishizaki 84'
- 2-3 Rafael 86'
- Elfsborg-Örebro 2-1
- 1-0 Daniel Mobaeck 6'
- 2-0 James Keene 13'
- 2-1 Mikael Astvald 13'
- IFK Göteborg-Elfsborg 4-0
- 1-0 Hjálmar Jónsson 55'
- 2-0 Hannes Stiller 57'
- 3-0 Hannes Stiller 65'
- 4-0 Tobias Hysén 88'
- Elfsborg-GAIS 2-2
- 1-0 Anders Svensson 40'
- 1-1 Wanderson 43'
- 2-1 Amadou Jawo 85'
- 2-2 Eyjólfur Héðinsson 89'
- Malmö FF-Elfsborg 5-0
- 1-0 Daniel Larsson 4'
- 2-0 Guillermo Molins 6'
- 3-0 Edward Ofere 40'
- 4-0 Edward Ofere 61'
- 5-0 Daniel Larsson 79'
- Elfsborg-Brommapojkarna 1-0
- 1-0 James Keene 52'
- Halmstad-Elfsborg 1-2
- 0-1 Martin Ericsson 27'
- 1-1 Azrack Mahamat 44'
- 1-2 Denni Avdić 88'
- Elfsborg-AIK 0-0
- Trelleborg-Elfsborg 0-1
- 0-1 Martin Ericsson 73' (pen.)
- Elfsborg-Häcken 1-1
- 1-0 Mattias Östberg 23' (o.g.)
- 1-1 Marcus Jarlegren 90'
- Örgryte-Elfsborg 1-1
- 0-1 James Keene 24'
- 1-1 Pavel Zavadil 83'
- Elfsborg-Helsingborg 1-0
- 1-0 James Keene 73'

=== Topscorers ===
- (England) James Keene 8
- (Sweden) Stefan Ishizaki 6
- (Sweden) Emir Bajrami 6
- (Sweden) Martin Ericsson 4
- (Sweden) Anders Svensson 4
- (Sweden) Denni Avdić 3
- (Sweden) Daniel Nordmark 3

== Sources ==
- Soccerway - IF Elfsborg matches
