= 2007 IF Elfsborg season =

IF Elfsborg
2007 season
- Manager: Magnus Haglund
- Allsvenskan: 4th
- Champions League: Play-off round
- Svenska Cupen: 3rd Round
- Supercupen: Champions
- UEFA Cup: Group Stage
- Top goalscorer: Anders Svensson (9)

IF Elfsborg did not repeat its 2006 league title, but at least managed to qualify for the group stage of the UEFA Cup, following the victory against Dinamo Bucharest in the play-off round, into which they had been relegated from the Champions League, where they had lost to Valencia in the final play-off round.

== Squad ==
=== Goalkeepers ===
- (Sweden) Johan Wiland
- (Sweden) Abbas Hassan

=== Defenders ===
- (Sweden) Mathias Florén
- (Sweden) Johan Karlsson
- (Sweden) Martin Andersson
- (Sweden) Daniel Mobaeck
- (Sweden) Markus Falk-Olander
- (Sweden) Fredrik Björck
- (Sweden) Andreas Augustsson
- (Sweden) Jon Jönsson

=== Midfielders ===
- (Finland) Jari Ilola
- (Sweden) Anders Svensson
- (Sweden) Emir Bajrami
- (Sweden) Stefan Ishizaki
- (Sweden) Elmin Kurbegović
- (Sweden) Daniel Eres
- (France) Léandre Griffit
- (Sweden) Samuel Holmén
- (Sweden) Daniel Alexandersson

=== Attackers ===
- (Sweden) Joakim Sjöhage
- (Sweden) Mathias Svensson
- (England) James Keene
- (Sweden) Fredrik Berglund

== Allsvenskan ==
=== Matches ===
- Elfsborg-Malmö FF 1-1
- 0-1 Jonatan Johansson 27'
- 1-1 Samuel Holmén 37'
- Örebro-Elfsborg 1-1
- 0-1 Emir Bajrami 9'
- 1-1 Nedim Halilović 37'
- Elfsborg-Gefle 1-1
- 0-1 Johannes Ericsson 24'
- 1-1 Stefan Ishizaki 82'
- Helsingborg-Elfsborg 0-1
- 0-1 Andreas Augustsson 3'
- Elfsborg-Djurgården 2-2
- 1-0 Jon Jönsson 12'
- 1-1 Robert Stoltz 27'
- 2-1 Anders Svensson 45'
- 2-2 Mikael Dahlberg 79'
- Kalmar FF-Elfsborg 2-1
- 1-0 Patrik Ingelsten 16'
- 2-0 Viktor Elm 22'
- 2-1 Anders Svensson 68'
- Trelleborg-Elfsborg 1-2
- 0-1 Mathias Svensson 30'
- 1-1 Michael Mensah 67'
- 1-2 Anders Svensson 74'
- Elfsborg-IFK Göteborg 3-1
- 0-1 Marcus Berg 26'
- 1-1 Anders Svensson 38'
- 2-1 Anders Svensson 62'
- 3-1 Anders Svensson 79'
- Hammarby-Elfsborg 0-1
- 0-1 Daniel Alexandersson 79'
- GAIS-Elfsborg 2-1
- 1-0 Bobbie Friberg da Cruz 12'
- 1-1 James Keene 30'
- 2-1 Fredrik Lundgren 89'
- Elfsborg-Trelleborg 2-0
- 1-0 James Keene 56'
- 2-0 Mathias Svensson 76'
- Elfsborg-Brommapojkarna 3-0
- 1-0 Stefan Ishizaki 10'
- 2-0 James Keene 44'
- 3-0 Daniel Alexandersson 81'
- Halmstad-Elfsborg 3-0
- 1-0 Dušan Đurić 20'
- 2-0 Mikael Rosén 52'
- 3-0 Hasse Mattisson 69'
- AIK-Elfsborg 0-1
- 0-1 Stefan Ishizaki 61'
- Elfsborg-AIK 2-0
- 1-0 James Keene 32'
- 2-0 Mathias Svensson 50'
- Djurgården-Elfsborg 2-1
- 0-1 Fredrik Berglund 3'
- 1-1 Thiago Quirino 87'
- 2-1 Toni Kuivasto 90'
- Elfsborg-Kalmar FF 2-2
- 0-1 Rasmus Elm 8'
- 1-1 Stefan Ishizaki 10'
- 2-1 Stefan Ishizaki 45'
- 2-2 César Santín 76'
- Elfsborg-GAIS 5-1
- 0-1 Bobbie Friberg da Cruz 4'
- 1-1 Stefan Ishizaki 36'
- 2-1 Samuel Holmén 44'
- 3-1 Fredrik Björck 45'
- 4-1 Fredrik Berglund 58'
- 5-1 Andreas Augustsson 83'
- Elfsborg-Helsingborg 0-0
- Gefle-Elfsborg 2-2
- 1-0 Johan Oremo 7'
- 1-1 Anders Svensson 21'
- 2-1 Daniel Bernhardsson 30'
- 2-2 Mathias Svensson 80'
- IFK Göteborg-Elfsborg 2-2
- 1-0 Gustaf Svensson 3'
- 2-0 Jonas Wallerstedt 23'
- 2-1 Stefan Ishizaki 37'
- 2-2 Stefan Ishizaki 66'
- Elfsborg-Hammarby 1-2
- 1-0 Mathias Svensson 4'
- 1-1 Sebastián Eguren 27'
- 1-2 Sebastián Eguren 73'
- Brommapojkarna-Elfsborg 1-1
- 0-1 Fredrik Berglund 55'
- 1-1 Martin Ekström 89'
- Elfsborg-Halmstad 1-1
- 0-1 Dušan Đurić 10'
- 1-1 Anders Svensson 67'
- Elfsborg-Örebro 0-2
- 0-1 Lars Larsen 51'
- 0-2 Patrik Anttonen 73'
- Malmö FF-Elfsborg 1-2
- 1-0 Júnior 11'
- 1-1 Anders Svensson 13'
- 1-2 Mathias Svensson 60'

=== Topscorers ===
- (Sweden) Anders Svensson 9
- (Sweden) Stefan Ishizaki 8
- (Sweden) Mathias Svensson 5
- (England) James Keene 4

== Sources ==
IF Elfsborg Results at Soccerway
