= List of IF Elfsborg players =

This list is about IF Elfsborg players with at least 100 league appearances. For a list of all IF Elfsborg players with a Wikipedia article, see Category:IF Elfsborg players. For the current IF Elfsborg first-team squad, see First-team squad.

This is a list of IF Elfsborg players with at least 100 league appearances.

== Players ==
Matches of current players as of 27 March 2014.

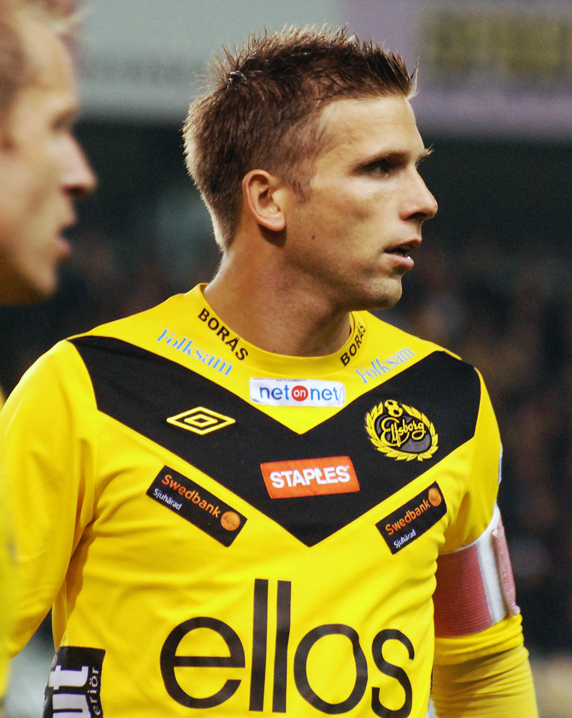
Anders Svensson has made 368 league appearances for IF Elfsborg.

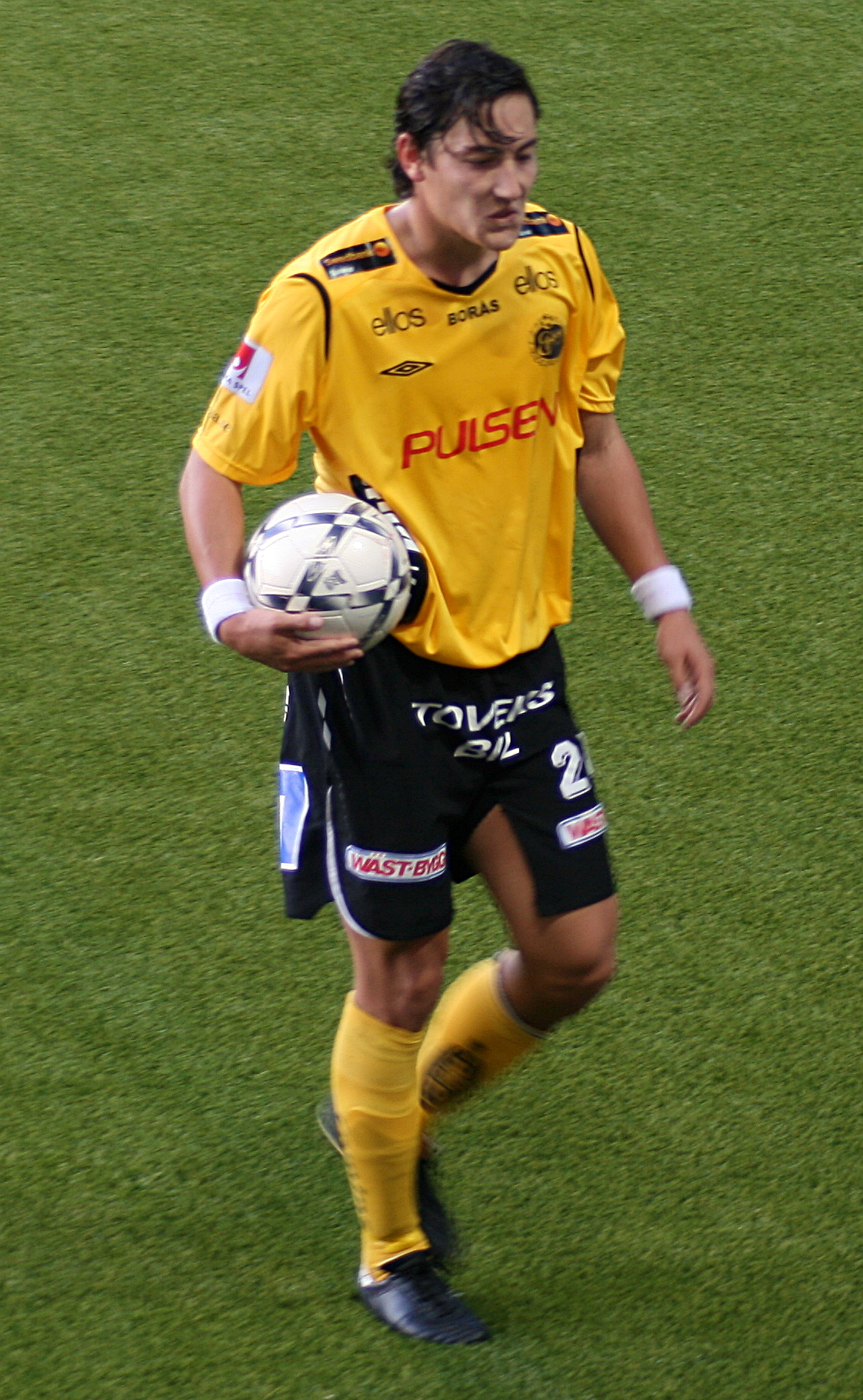
Stefan Ishizaki has made 183 league appearances for IF Elfsborg.

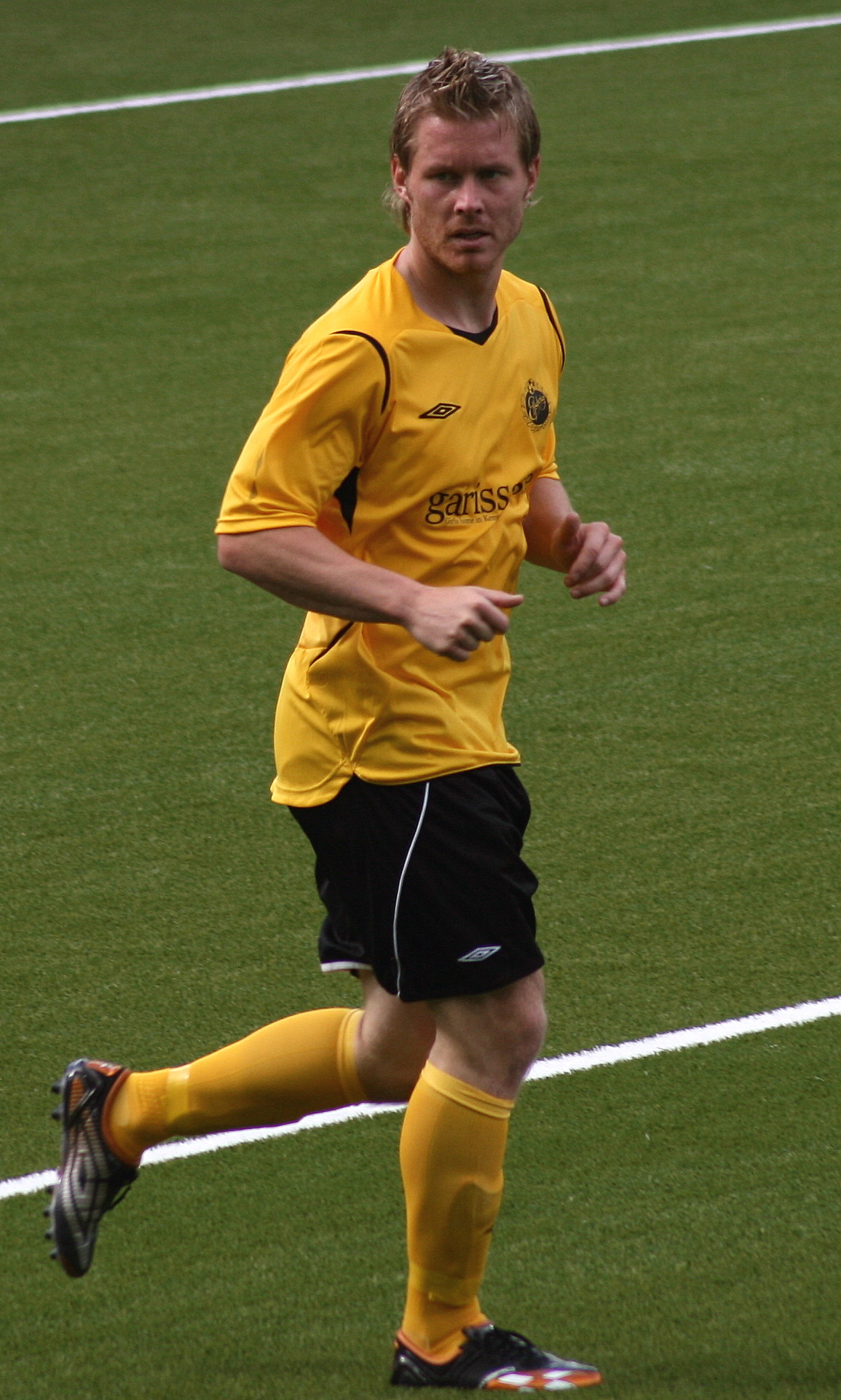
Fredrik Berglund has made 168 league appearances for IF Elfsborg.

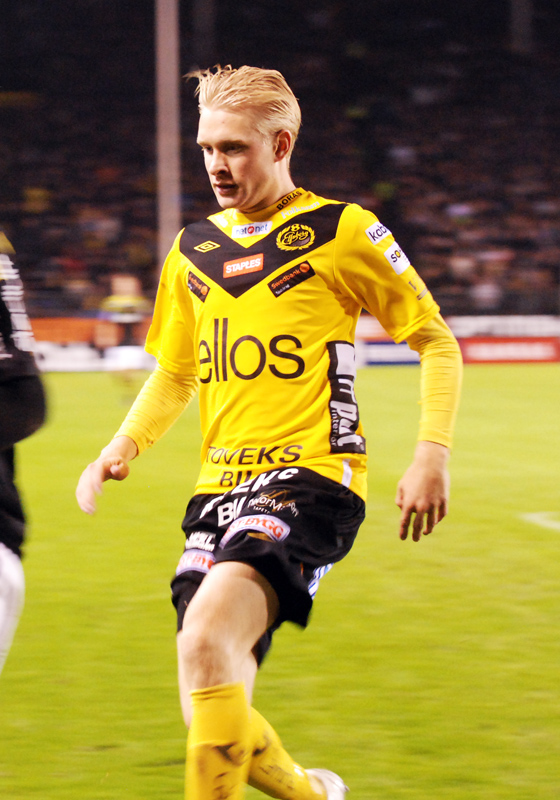
Johan Larsson has made 119 league appearances for IF Elfsborg.

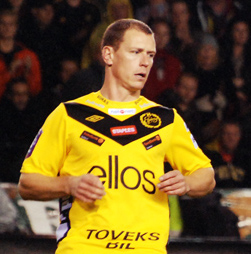
Andreas Augustsson has made 114 league appearances for IF Elfsborg.

Name	Nationality	Position	Elfsborg career	League apps	League goals	Total apps	Total goals
Anders Svensson	Sweden	MF	1994–2001; 2005–	368	68		
Johan Karlsson	Sweden	DF	2001–2011	263	7		
Johan Wiland	Sweden	GK	2000–2008	206	0		
Daniel Mobaeck	Sweden	DF	2005–	187	12		
Stefan Ishizaki	Sweden	FW	2006–2013	183	48		
Fredrik Berglund	Sweden	FW	1995–2001; 2003; 2007–2010	168	55		
Lasse Nilsson	Sweden	FW	2002–2004; 2008; 2011–	167	45		
Johan Larsson	Sweden	DF	2010–	119	18		
Andreas Augustsson	Sweden	DF	2006–2008; 2011–2012	114	7		
Samuel Holmén	Sweden	MF	2002–2007	112	18		
Daniel Alexandersson	Sweden	MF	2004–2007	100	14		
