= Abbas Hassan =

Association football player

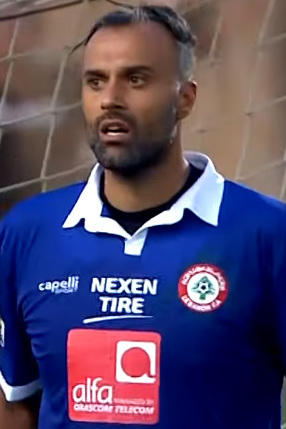
- Hassan with Nejmeh in 2019

Personal information
- Full name: Abbas Ahmad Hassan
- Date of birth: 10 May 1985 (age 41)
- Place of birth: Blida, Lebanon
- Height: 1.97 m (6 ft 6 in)
- Position: Goalkeeper

Team information
- Current team: Falkenbergs FF (goalkeeper coach, player)
- Number: 44

Youth career
- –2002: Arvidstorps IK
- 2002–2005: IF Elfsborg

Senior career*
Years	Team	Apps	(Gls)
2005–2010	IF Elfsborg	15	(0)
2008	→ Halmstads BK (loan)	0	(0)
2009–2010	→ Aalborg BK (loan)	0	(0)
2010	→ IFK Norrköping (loan)	2	(0)
2011–2013	IFK Norrköping	30	(0)
2013–2016	IF Elfsborg	6	(0)
2016	Örgryte IS	12	(0)
2017–2020	Nejmeh	25	(0)
2026–	Falkenbergs FF	1	(0)

International career
2003	Sweden U18	1	(0)
2006	Sweden U21	2	(0)
2012–2018	Lebanon	25	(0)

Managerial career
- 2025–: Falkenbergs FF (goalkeeper)
- * Club domestic league appearances and goals as of 30 May 2026

Abbas Ahmad Hassan (Arabic: عباس أحمد حسن; born 10 May 1985) is a professional football coach and player who is the goalkeeper coach of Swedish club Falkenbergs FF while also playing as a goalkeeper for the club. Born in Lebanon, he played for Sweden at youth level and for Lebanon at senior level.

Coming through the youth sector, Hassan made his professional debut at IF Elfsborg in 2005. After a loan at Aalborg BK in 2009–10, Hassan joined IFK Norrköping, with whom he stayed from 2011 to 2013. That year he returned to IF Elfsborg, playing three years, before moving to Örgryte IS in 2016. In 2017 Hassan moved for the first—and only—time away from Europe, playing in his country of origin, Lebanon. He played for Nejmeh between 2017 and 2020.

== Early life ==
Hassan was born in Blida, Lebanon, in 1985, and moved to Sweden with his family in 1992. He grew up in Falkenberg, where he began playing football with local club Arvidstorps IK before joining IF Elfsborg's youth academy in 2002.

== Club career ==
=== IF Elfsborg ===
Coming through the youth system, Hassan made his first-team debut for IF Elfsborg in 2005 after first-choice goalkeeper Johan Wiland suffered an injury. Hassan's performances earned him a place in the starting lineup ahead of Håkan Svensson, who had been signed as a temporary replacement for Wiland. However, an injury during the 2006 pre-season allowed Wiland to regain his position as first-choice goalkeeper.

In early 2008, Hassan spent time on trial with English club Manchester City. Ahead of the 2009 season, he was considered a candidate to replace the departing Wiland, who had joined Copenhagen. However, the arrivals of Ante Covic and Joakim Wulff relegated Hassan to third-choice goalkeeper, prompting him to express his desire to leave the club. On 9 July 2009, Hassan joined Danish club Aalborg BK on a one-year loan deal.

=== IFK Norrköping ===
On 29 June 2010, he signed a short-term contract with Superettan side IFK Norrköping as cover for the injured David Mitov Nilsson. Hassan made his league debut for IFK Norrköping on 27 August 2010, in a 2–1 victory over Ljungskile SK, replacing suspended goalkeeper Niklas Westberg. Following the club's promotion to Allsvenskan, he signed a three-year contract with IFK Norrköping in December 2010, bringing his time at IF Elfsborg to an end.

=== Return to IF Elfsborg ===
On 6 February 2013, Hassan returned to IF Elfsborg, the reigning Swedish champions, after terminating his contract with IFK Norrköping. He was brought in as a reserve goalkeeper for Kevin Stuhr Ellegaard.

=== Örgryte IS ===
Hassan joined Örgryte IS in summer 2016, leaving at the end of the 2016 season.

=== Nejmeh ===
Hassan joined Lebanese Premier League club Nejmeh in July 2017. In 2020, amid Lebanon's financial crisis and the suspension of football during the COVID-19 pandemic, he entered a contractual dispute with the club regarding unpaid salaries and later announced his retirement from playing.

=== Falkenbergs FF ===
Following his retirement from professional football in 2020, Hassan joined Falkenbergs FF as the club's goalkeeping coach in 2025. On 30 May 2026, he made an unexpected return to playing during a Superettan match against IK Oddevold. With Anton Andersson forced off injured and Gustav Lillienberg unavailable, Hassan was called upon to replace Andersson in goal. The appearance was his first competitive match since playing for Nejmeh in Lebanon in 2019.

== International career ==
Hassan played for Sweden at under-18 and under-21 levels between 2003 and 2006.

Hassan made his debut for the Lebanon national team on 22 January 2012, in a friendly match against Iraq. One of his most notable performances came on 11 September 2012, in Lebanon's 1–0 victory over Iran during qualification for the 2014 FIFA World Cup. Named man of the match, Hassan produced a series of crucial saves to preserve Lebanon's lead. Following the match, Iran manager Carlos Queiroz remarked: "I think a national hero was born today. For me, the score was Abbas Hassan 1, Iran 0." Hassan also played a key role in Lebanon's World Cup qualifier against South Korea on 4 June 2013, making several important saves before Kim Chi-woo scored a late equaliser in the 97th minute.

== Managerial career ==
On 23 December 2024, Hassan was appointed goalkeeper coach of Falkenbergs FF ahead of the 2025 season. His contract was extended for a further year on 9 February 2026.

== Career statistics ==
=== Club ===
As of match played 30 May 2026

Appearances and goals by club, season and competition
Club	Season	League			National cup (Note: Includes Svenska Cupen, Danish Cup, Lebanese FA Cup)		Total	
Club	Season	Division	Apps	Goals	Apps	Goals	Apps	Goals
IF Elfsborg	2005	Allsvenskan	10	0	—		10	0
IF Elfsborg	2006	Allsvenskan	0	0	—		0	0
IF Elfsborg	2007	Allsvenskan	3	0	—		3	0
IF Elfsborg	2008	Allsvenskan	2	0	1	0	3	0
IF Elfsborg	2009	Allsvenskan	0	0	0	0	0	0
IF Elfsborg	2010	Allsvenskan	—		—		0	0
IF Elfsborg	Total		15	0	1	0	16	0
Halmstads BK (loan)	2008	Allsvenskan	0	0	1	0	1	0
Aalborg BK (loan)	2009–10	Danish Superliga	0	0	0	0	0	0
IFK Norrköping (loan)	2010	Superettan	2	0	0	0	2	0
IFK Norrköping	2011	Allsvenskan	19	0	0	0	19	0
IFK Norrköping	2012	Allsvenskan	11	0	0	0	11	0
IFK Norrköping	Total		30	0	0	0	30	0
IF Elfsborg	2013	Allsvenskan	2	0	2	0	4	0
IF Elfsborg	2014	Allsvenskan	3	0	1	0	4	0
IF Elfsborg	2015	Allsvenskan	1	0	1	0	2	0
IF Elfsborg	Total		6	0	4	0	10	0
Örgryte IS	2016	Superettan	12	0	0	0	12	0
Nejmeh	2017–18	Lebanese Premier League	12	0	—		12	0
Nejmeh	2018–19	Lebanese Premier League	11	0	—		11	0
Nejmeh	2019–20	Lebanese Premier League	2	0	—		2	0
Nejmeh	Total		25	0	0	0	25	0
Falkenbergs FF	2026	Superettan	1	0	0	0	1	0
Career total			91	0	6	0	97	0

=== International ===
Appearances and goals by national team and year
National team	Year	Apps	Goals
Lebanon	2012	9	0
Lebanon	2013	11	0
Lebanon	2014	1	0
Lebanon	2015	3	0
Lebanon	2016	0	0
Lebanon	2023	0	0
Lebanon	2024	1	0
Total		25	0

== Honours ==
IF Elfsborg

- Allsvenskan: 2006
- Svenska Cupen: 2013–14
- Svenska Supercupen: 2007

Nejmeh

- Lebanese Elite Cup: 2017, 2018

Individual

- IFFHS All-time Lebanon Men's Dream Team

== See also ==
- List of sportspeople who competed for more than one nation
