= 1999 AIK Fotboll season =

AIK
1999 season
- Manager: Stuart Baxter
- Stadium: Råsunda Stadium
- Allsvenskan: 2nd
- Champions League: Group stage

The 1999 season was AIK's 108th in existence. The team competed in the Allsvenskan and UEFA Champions League.

AIK finished second in the league table.

== First-team squad ==
Note: Flags indicate national team as defined under FIFA eligibility rules; some limited exceptions apply. Players may hold more than one non-FIFA nationality.

| No. | Pos. | Nation | Player |
|---|---|---|---|
| 1 | GK | SWE | Mattias Asper |
| 2 | MF | SWE | Krister Nordin (captain) |
| 3 | DF | SWE | Karl Corneliusson |
| 4 | MF | SWE | Ola Andersson |
| 5 | DF | SWE | Michael Brundin |
| 6 | DF | SWE | Tomas Gustafsson |
| 7 | FW | BIH | Nebojša Novaković |
| 8 | MF | SWE | Daniel Tjernström |
| 9 | MF | SWE | Hans Bergh |
| 10 | MF | SWE | Martin Åslund |
| 11 | FW | SWE | Andreas Andersson |

| No. | Pos. | Nation | Player |
|---|---|---|---|
| 12 | GK | SWE | Lee Baxter |
| 13 | FW | SWE | Christer Mattiasson |
| 14 | MF | SWE | Thomas Lagerlöf |
| 15 | FW | SWE | David Ljung |
| 16 | DF | NOR | Mike Kjølø |
| 17 | DF | SWE | Pontus Kåmark |
| 18 | MF | SWE | Marcus Bengtsson |
| 19 | FW | SWE | Daniel Hoch |
| 21 | MF | SWE | Andreas Johansson |
| 24 | FW | SWE | Stefan Ishizaki |

=== In ===
| No. | Pos. | Nat. | Name | Age | EU | Moving from | Type | Transfer window | Ends | Transfer fee | Source |
|---|---|---|---|---|---|---|---|---|---|---|---|
| 3 | | | Karl Corneliusson | 28 | | | | | | | [] |
| 8 | MF | | Daniel Tjernström | 25 | | Örebro SK | | | | | [] |
| 10 | FW | | Andreas Andersson | 25 | | Newcastle United (England) | | | | | [] |
| 14 | | | Christer Mattiasson | 23 | | | | | | | [] |
| 17 | DF | | Pontus Kåmark | 30 | | Leicester City (England) | | | | | [] |
| 21 | MF | | Andreas Johansson | 21 | | Degerfors IF | | | | | [] |

== Results ==
=== Allsvenskan ===
| Pos | Team | Pld | W | D | L | GF | GA | GD | Pts | Qualification or relegation |
|---|---|---|---|---|---|---|---|---|---|---|
| 1 | Helsingborgs IF (C) | 26 | 17 | 3 | 6 | 44 | 24 | +20 | 54 | Qualification to Champions League second qualifying round |
| 2 | AIK | 26 | 16 | 5 | 5 | 42 | 14 | +28 | 53 | Qualification to UEFA Cup qualifying round |
| 3 | Halmstads BK | 26 | 14 | 6 | 6 | 43 | 22 | +21 | 48 | Qualification to UEFA Cup qualifying round |
| 4 | Örgryte IS | 26 | 11 | 10 | 5 | 41 | 23 | +18 | 43 | Qualification to UEFA Cup qualifying round |
| 5 | IFK Norrköping | 26 | 11 | 6 | 9 | 41 | 36 | +5 | 39 | Qualification to UEFA Cup qualifying round |

Rules for classification: 1) points; 2) goal difference; 3) number of goals scored.
(C) Champions

=== UEFA Champions League ===
==== Group stage ====
| Pos | Team | Pld | W | D | L | GF | GA | GD | Pts | Qualification | BAR | FIO | ARS | AIK |
|---|---|---|---|---|---|---|---|---|---|---|---|---|---|---|
| 1 | (Spain) Barcelona | 6 | 4 | 2 | 0 | 19 | 9 | +10 | 14 | Advance to second group stage | — | 4–2 | 1–1 | 5–0 |
| 2 | (Italy) Fiorentina | 6 | 2 | 3 | 1 | 9 | 7 | +2 | 9 | Advance to second group stage | 3–3 | — | 0–0 | 3–0 |
| 3 | (England) Arsenal | 6 | 2 | 2 | 2 | 9 | 9 | 0 | 8 | Transfer to UEFA Cup | 2–4 | 0–1 | — | 3–1 |
| 4 | (Sweden) AIK | 6 | 0 | 1 | 5 | 4 | 16 | −12 | 1 | | 1–2 | 0–0 | 2–3 | — |

Source: UEFA
