= Denni Avdić =

Swedish footballer (born 1988)

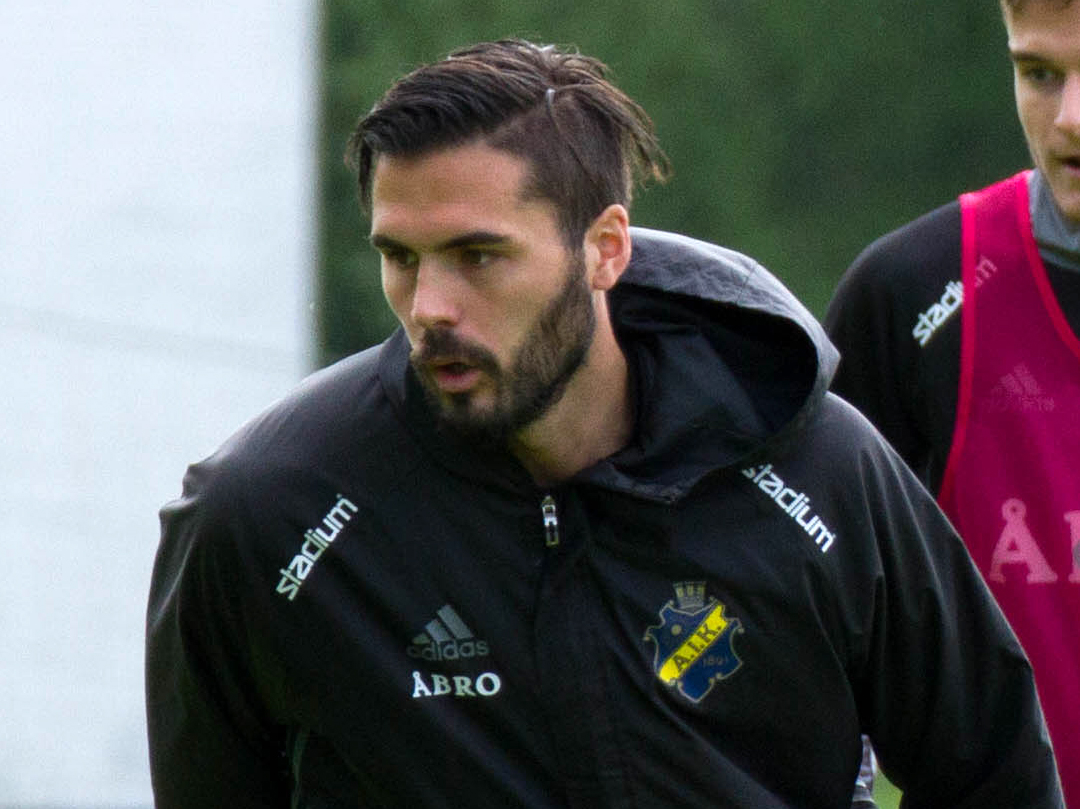
- Avdić training with AIK in 2016

Personal information
- Full name: Denni Robin Avdić
- Date of birth: 5 September 1988 (age 38)
- Place of birth: Huskvarna, Sweden
- Height: 1.92 m (6 ft 4 in)
- Position: Centre-forward

Team information
- Current team: Vasalund IF
- Number: 26

Youth career
- Husqvarna FF
- –2005: Brøndby

Senior career*
Years	Team	Apps	(Gls)
2006–2011	Elfsborg	104	(26)
2011–2013	Werder Bremen	7	(0)
2011–2012	Werder Bremen II	12	(0)
2012–2013	→ PEC Zwolle (loan)	23	(8)
2013–2015	AZ	13	(0)
2014–2015	→ Heracles Almelo (loan)	22	(4)
2016–2018	AIK	55	(5)
2019	AFC Eskilstuna	16	(1)
2021–	Vasalund IF	20	(2)

International career
2003–2004	Sweden U17	15	(8)
2005–2007	Sweden U19	18	(4)
2007–2010	Sweden U21	24	(7)
2009	Sweden	1	(0)
- * Club domestic league appearances and goals as of 12:35, 14 November 2021 (UTC)

Denni Robin Avdić (born Deni Avdić; 5 September 1988) is a Swedish professional footballer who plays as a centre-forward for Vasalund IF.

Beginning his professional career with IF Elfsborg, he has gone on to play professionally in Germany for Werder Bremen and in the Netherlands for PEC Zwolle, AZ Alkmaar, and Heracles Almelo before returning to Sweden in 2016. He has won one cap for the Sweden national team.

== Club career ==
=== Early career ===
Avdić was born in Huskvarna, Sweden. At 15 years old he was signed by Danish Superliga club Brøndby IF, playing for Brøndby's reserve team in the Danish 2nd Division East – the third tier of Danish football; never played any senior games for the club. In 2006, Avdić was released by Brøndby, as he wanted to live closer to his family in Sweden.

=== IF Elfsborg ===
He was picked up by IF Elfsborg in the Swedish Allsvenskan championship. When he was signed by Elfsborg, he was praised by its officials as one of the greatest talents in Swedish football.

Avdić made his debut for Elfsborg in November 2006. He played from the start in Elfsborg's first ever Royal League match, and scored two goals in the 4–0 win over AIK. In the 2010 season of Allsvenskan, Avdić changed position from attacking-midfielder to striker, his previous position as a youth player. He scored 19 goals, making him runner-up golden boot that season; Alexander Gerndt scored 20 goals. Due to this he was sold the same season for a transfer fee of £2 million to Werder Bremen.

=== Werder Bremen ===
On 3 January 2011, Avdić became Werder Bremen's first new signing of that winter, as confirmed by the website of the German Bundesliga club. He signed a contract until summer 2014. He featured for the team only on rare occasions during the 2011–12 Bundesliga season. due to his repeated injuries. Before his loan to PEC Zwolle, Avdić played seven games in Bundesliga and 12 games for Werder's second team never scoring a single goal.

==== Loan to PEC Zwolle ====
On 29 August 2012, Avdić agreed to a loan until the end of season 2013 to the Dutch football team PEC Zwolle in Eredivisie. He scored as a substitute his debut goal for the club in his fourth game. On 17 February 2013, in his 14th game, against Feyenoord, Avdić made the match-winning 3–2 goal for Zwolle. This was at the time his seventh cumulative goal count, the second best Swedish goalscorer in the 2012–13 season, exceeded by Zlatan Ibrahimović. Where experts claimed that he deserved a place in the Sweden national team, due to Sweden's unavailability of good strikers.

=== AZ Alkmaar ===
In summer 2013, Avdić joined AZ Alkmaar. He made his debut on 30 October in a KNVB Cup match against Achilles '29, scoring two goals. AZ won the match with 7–0.

==== Loan to Heracles Almelo ====
On 15 August 2014, as a result of having no prospect with AZ, he was sent on loan to Heracles Almelo until the end of the season.

=== Return to Sweden ===
He signed with AIK in 2016, and was a part of the AIK team that won the 2018 Allsvenskan.

In February 2019, joined AFC Eskilstuna, newly promoted to Allsvenskan. He left the club at the end of the year. After a long time without a club he signed for Vasalund IF in March 2021.

In March 2021, Avdić joined Vasalund IF.

== International career ==
Avdić scored a total of 19 goals in 57 games for the Sweden U17, U19, and U21 teams, and was a part of the Sweden U21 squad that reached the semi-finals of the 2009 UEFA European Under-21 Championship on home soil.

He made his full international debut for Sweden on 28 January 2009 in a friendly game against Mexico, coming on as a substitute for Daniel Nannskog in the 66th minute.

== Career statistics ==
As of 28 February 2019

Appearances and goals by club, season and competition
Club	Season	League			Cup		Continental		Total	
Club	Season	Division	Apps	Goals	Apps	Goals	Apps	Goals	Apps	Goals
IF Elfsborg	2007	Allsvenskan	19	0	0	0	6	0	25	0
IF Elfsborg	2008	Allsvenskan	25	4	0	0	1	0	26	4
IF Elfsborg	2009	Allsvenskan	29	3	2	0	6	2	37	5
IF Elfsborg	2010	Allsvenskan	29	19	2	1	4	1	35	21
IF Elfsborg	Total		102	26	4	1	17	3	123	30
Werder Bremen	2010–11	Bundesliga	7	0	0	0	4	1	11	1
Werder Bremen II	2010–11	3. Liga	1	0	—		—		1	0
Werder Bremen II	2011–12	3. Liga	11	0	—		—		11	0
Werder Bremen II	Total		12	0	0	0	0	0	12	0
PEC Zwolle	2012–13	Eredivisie	23	8	4	0	—		23	8
AZ Alkmaar	2013–14	Eredivisie	13	0	2	2	4	0	19	2
Heracles Almelo	2014–15	Eredivisie	22	4	2	0	—		24	4
AIK	2016	Allsvenskan	15	2	3	1	5	1	23	4
AIK	2017	Allsvenskan	21	3	4	1	4	0	29	4
AIK	2018	Allsvenskan	19	0	1	0	3	0	23	0
AIK	Total		55	5	8	2	12	1	75	8
Career total			234	43	20	5	37	5	291	53

== Honours ==
IF Elfsborg

- Allsvenskan: 2006
- Svenska Supercupen: 2007

AIK

- Allsvenskan: 2018

Individual

- Allsvenskan top scorer runner-up: 2010
