= Karl Corneliusson =

Swedish footballer (born 1976)

Personal information
- Full name: Björn Karl Håkan Corneliusson
- Date of birth: 17 November 1976 (age 49)
- Place of birth: Gothenburg, Sweden
- Height: 1.75 m (5 ft 9 in)
- Position: Defender

Youth career
- 1982–1985: Masthuggets BK
- 1986–1987: Göteborgs FF
- 1988–1994: Örgryte IS

Senior career*
Years	Team	Apps	(Gls)
1994–1998	Örgryte IS	56	(1)
1999–2003	AIK	98	(7)
2004–2005	Salernitana	22	(2)
2004–2005	→ Napoli (loan)	11	(0)
2005–2007	Landskrona BoIS	43	(3)
2008–2009	Lilla Torg FF	19	(1)
2010–2012	BK Skottfint	11	(1)
2014	Stenungsunds IF	0	(0)
2014	Styrsö BK	3	(1)

International career
1992–1993	Sweden U17	13	(2)
1994	Sweden U19	7	(1)
1996–1998	Sweden U21	19	(1)
2000–2001	Sweden	9	(1)
- * Club domestic league appearances and goals

Björn Karl Håkan Corneliusson (born 17 November 1976) is a Swedish former professional footballer who played as a defender. Starting off his career with Örgryte IS, he went on to play professionally for AIK, Salernitana, Napoli, and Landskrona BoIS during a career that spanned between 1994 and 2007. He won nine caps for the Sweden national team between 2000 and 2001, scoring one goal.

== Club career ==
Corneliusson began his footballing career with Örgryte IS, before signing with AIK ahead of the 1999 Allsvenskan season. While at AIK, he was a part of the team that competed in the 1999–2000 UEFA Champions League, as well as won the 1998–1999 Svenska Cupen.

After the 2003 Allsvenskan season, he left AIK to sign for Salernitana in the Italian Serie B. The following season, he was loaned out to Napoli in Serie C. In 2005, he returned home to Sweden to sign for Landskrona BoIS.

== International career ==
=== Youth ===
Corneliusson made a total of 39 appearances for the Sweden U17, U19, and U21 teams, and was a part of the Sweden U21 team that finished 6th at the 1998 UEFA European Under-21 Championship in Romania.

=== Senior ===
Corneliusson made his full international debut for Sweden on 4 February 2000 in a friendly game against Norway, coming on as a substitute for Teddy Lucic in the 71st minute in a game that ended in a 0–1 loss. Later that year, he made his competitive debut for Sweden in a 2002 FIFA World Cup qualifier against Turkey, replacing Niclas Alexandersson in the 55th minute and picking up a yellow card in a 1–1 draw.

Corneliusson scored his only international goal for Sweden on 28 February 2001 in a friendly game against Malta, netting the first goal in a 3–0 win. He won his ninth and final international cap on 25 April 2001 in a 2-0 friendly win against Switzerland.

Corneliusson played in three 2002 FIFA World Cup qualifying games, but was not called up to Sweden's 2002 FIFA World Cup squad after injuring his hand only a month before the tournament.

== Career statistics ==
=== International ===
Appearances and goals by national team and year
National team	Year	Apps	Goals
Sweden	2000	2	0
Sweden	2001	7	1
Total		9	1

Scores and results list Sweden's goal tally first, score column indicates score after each Corneliusson goal.

List of international goals scored by Karl Corneliusson
No.	Date	Venue	Opponent	Score	Result	Competition	Ref.
1	28 February 2001	National Stadium Ta' Qali, Ta' Qali, Malta	Malta	1–0	3–0	Friendly	

== Honours ==
AIK

- Svenska Cupen: 1998–1999

Individual

- Isidorpriset: 2000
