= Guldhedens IK =

Swedish football club

- Full name: Guldhedens Idrottsklubb
- Nickname: GIK
- Ground: Bergsjövallen & Mossens IP; Gothenburg; Sweden
- Chairman: Lars Nilsson
- League: Division 4 Göteborg A
- 2021: Division 4 Göteborg B, 11th (Relegated)
Home colours	Away colours

Guldhedens IK is a Swedish football club located in Gothenburg.

== Background ==
Guldhedens Idrottsklubb is a sports club catering for football, floorball and handball. The aim of the club is to offer children and young people in the vicinity an opportunity to meet and play sports together. There are now about 500 members of the association.

The club's key objective is to jointly develop and nurture players who at some time in the future may reach a level that extends to the national team. To date GIK has developed Anders Svensson who has progressed to play in the national team.

Guldhedens IK currently plays in Division 4 Göteborg A which is the sixth tier of Swedish football. They play their home matches at the Bergsjövallen and Mossens IP in Göteborg.

The club is affiliated to Göteborgs Fotbollförbund. Guldhedens IK have competed in the Svenska Cupen on 12 occasions and have played 22 matches in the competition.

== Season to season ==
Season	Level	Division	Section	Position	Movements
1999	Tier 5	Division 4	Göteborg B	11th	
2000	Tier 6	Division 5	Göteborg B	3rd	Promoted
2001	Tier 5	Division 4	Göteborg A	8th	
2002	Tier 5	Division 4	Göteborg A	3rd	
2003	Tier 5	Division 4	Göteborg A	5th	
2004	Tier 5	Division 4	Göteborg A	6th	
2005	Tier 5	Division 4	Göteborg A	8th	
2006*	Tier 6	Division 4	Göteborg A	11th	Relegated
2007	Tier 7	Division 5	Göteborg A	5th	
2008	Tier 7	Division 5	Göteborg A	2nd	Promoted
2009	Tier 6	Division 4	Göteborg A	6th	
2010	Tier 6	Division 4	Göteborg A	7th	
2011	Tier 6	Division 4	Göteborg A	7th	
2012	Tier 6	Division 4	Göteborg A	7th	
2013	Tier 6	Division 4	Göteborg A	10th	
2014	Tier 6	Division 4	Göteborg A	8th	
2015	Tier 6	Division 4	Göteborg A	8th	
2016	Tier 6	Division 4	Göteborg A	8th	
2017	Tier 6	Division 4	Göteborg A	10th	
2018	Tier 6	Division 4	Göteborg A	2nd	Promotion Playoffs
2019	Tier 6	Division 4	Göteborg A	7th	
2020	Tier 6	Division 4	Göteborg A	3rd	
2021	Tier 6	Division 4	Göteborg B	11th	Relegated

* League restructuring in 2006 resulted in a new division being created at Tier 3 and subsequent divisions dropping a level.

== Attendances ==
In recent seasons IF Warta have had the following average attendances:

Season	Average attendance	Division / Section	Level
2009	Not Available	Div 4 Göteborg A	Tier 6
2010	24	Div 4 Göteborg A	Tier 6
2011	50	Div 4 Göteborg A	Tier 6
2012	41	Div 4 Göteborg A	Tier 6
2013	33	Div 4 Göteborg A	Tier 6
2014	35	Div 4 Göteborg A	Tier 6
2015	49	Div 4 Göteborg A	Tier 6
2016	32	Div 4 Göteborg A	Tier 6
2017	35	Div 4 Göteborg A	Tier 6
2018	40	Div 4 Göteborg A	Tier 6
2019		Div 4 Göteborg A	Tier 6
2020		Div 4 Göteborg A	Tier 6

* Attendances are provided in the Publikliga sections of the Svenska Fotbollförbundet website.
