= Teddy Lučić =

Swedish footballer and manager

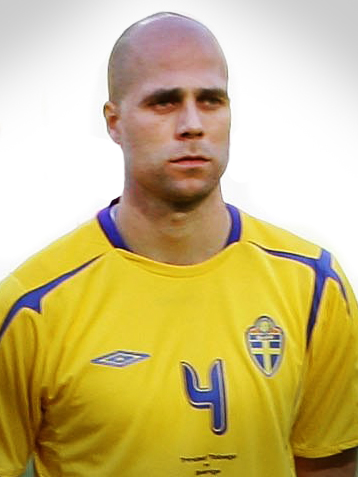
- Lučić lining up for Team Sweden during the FIFA World Cup in Germany in June 2006

Personal information
- Full name: Teddy Mark Šime Lučić
- Date of birth: 15 April 1973 (age 53)
- Place of birth: Gothenburg, Sweden
- Height: 1.87 m (6 ft 2 in)
- Position: Centre back

Youth career
- Lundby IF

Senior career*
Years	Team	Apps	(Gls)
1989–1992	Lundby IF	63	(13)
1993–1995	Västra Frölunda IF	68	(0)
1996–1998	IFK Göteborg	58	(2)
1998–2000	Bologna	9	(0)
2000–2003	AIK	58	(4)
2002–2003	→ Leeds United (loan)	17	(1)
2003–2005	Bayer Leverkusen	11	(0)
2005–2007	BK Häcken	70	(8)
2008–2010	IF Elfsborg	66	(3)
2012	KF Velebit	15	(1)
2015	Holmalunds IF	9	(1)
Total		444	(33)

International career
1993–1995	Sweden U21	18	(1)
1995–2006	Sweden	86	(0)

Managerial career
- 2011–2014: KF Velebit (manager)
Medal record
Sweden
FIFA World Cup
Bronze medal – third place	1994	{{{2}}}
- * Club domestic league appearances and goals

Teddy Mark Šime Lučić (Swedish pronunciation: [ˈtɛ̌dːʏ ˈlʊ̌tːɕɪtɕ]; born 15 April 1973) is a Swedish former professional footballer and manager. He played as a centre-back. Lučić made his debut for Sweden in 1995, and represented his country at three FIFA World Cups (1994, 2002, and 2006) and two UEFA European Championships (2000 and 2004), earning a total of 86 caps.

== Early life ==
Lučić was born on 15 April 1973 in Biskopsgården, Gothenburg to Croatian father, Krešimir, and Finnish mother, Annis. His father Krešimir was also a football player. In 1966, Krešimir moved to Sweden where he played football. In 1971, his father was offered to play for Halmstads BK but declined because he thought he was too old, at age 27. The Lučić family decided to live in Sweden but visited Croatia and Finland often.

As a boy, Lučić attended the Bjurslätt School in Hisingen, which is only 500 meters from where BK Häcken have their exercise equipment. Due to his parents' heritage, Lučić had Yugoslav passport rather than a Swedish one, which prevented him from playing in the Swedish Junior Team.

== Club career ==
=== Early career ===
He began playing for Lundby IF as an 18-year-old for whom he played 44 times in the Swedish league and scored 10 goals from fullback. He moved to Västra Frölunda IF in 1993 for a two-year spell in which he played 68 matches. In 1996, he moved on to IFK Göteborg, landing the Swedish championship in his first season.

=== Bologna ===
Lučić went abroad to Italy upon leaving IFK Göteborg in 1998. However, he found his opportunities limited at his new club and consequently made just nine league appearances in the Serie A in a two-year spell.

=== AIK ===
Lučić returned to Sweden in 2000, signing for AIK Fotboll. He made 58 appearances and scored four times. He left the club in 2003 to move to Germany.

==== Loan to Leeds United ====
Lučić's period at AIK Fotboll was broken up by a loan spell at English club Leeds United, starting in 2002. During his time in England, he made a total of 17 league appearances and scored one goal, in a 3–2 defeat at Chelsea in January 2003. His loan spell ended in 2003 after Leeds decided not to sign him on a permanent deal. AIK had offered Lučić to a number of clubs.

=== Bayer Leverkusen ===
Lučić signed for Bayer Leverkusen directly from Leeds in May 2003. He failed to get a major impact for the starting 11 in Bundesliga, and only played 11 times for the club, before he left for Sweden in December 2004.

=== Return to Sweden ===
Lučić went back to Sweden for a second time to sign for BK Häcken, where he made 70 appearances and scored 8 goals. In 2008, Lučić moved again to the ninth club of his career, IF Elfsborg where he was a regular in the starting eleven until the end of his career. After IF Elfsborgs last game of the season, on 7 November 2010, Lucic officially ended his career as a player.

== International career ==
Lučić played 86 times for the Swedish national team, mostly as a full back. He was handed his debut against Brazil in June 1995, having been an unused squad member at the 1994 FIFA World Cup.

Since 2004, he played as centre back. Lučić played in Euro 2004, and the 2002 and 2006 World Cups (in 1994 he was unused substitute having been called up to replace Jan Eriksson). Against Germany, in what turned out to be Sweden's final 2006 World Cup match, he was given two yellow cards by Brazilian referee Carlos Eugênio Simon, and sent off in the 35th minute.

== Personal life ==
Due to his multinational background, Lučić had the option to play for two other countries—his mother is Finnish and his father Croatian. He is fluent in Croatian and also speaks some Finnish. He has a summer cottage in Lappeenranta, Finland, and is a fan of Lappeenranta-based first division football team Rakuunat and ice hockey team SaiPa.

== Career statistics ==
=== Club ===
Club performance			League		Cup		League Cup		Continental		Total	
Club	Season	League	Apps	Goals	Apps	Goals	Apps	Goals	Apps	Goals	Apps	Goals
Sweden			League		Svenska Cupen		League Cup		Europe		Total	
Lundby IF	1989	Division 3	1	0								
Lundby IF	1990	Division 4	18	3								
Lundby IF	1991	Division 3	22	3								
Lundby IF	1992	Division 4	22	7								
Västra Frölunda	1993	Allsvenskan	17	0								
Västra Frölunda	1994	Allsvenskan	25	0								
Västra Frölunda	1995	Allsvenskan	26	0								
IFK Göteborg	1996	Allsvenskan	24	0								
IFK Göteborg	1997	Allsvenskan	11	2								
IFK Göteborg	1998	Allsvenskan	23	0								
Italy			League		Coppa Italia		League Cup		Europe		Total	
Bologna	1998–99	Serie A	8	0								
Bologna	1999–00	Serie A	1	0								
Sweden			League		Svenska Cupen		League Cup		Europe		Total	
AIK	2000	Allsvenskan	22	3								
AIK	2001	Allsvenskan	20	0								
AIK	2002	Allsvenskan	16	1								
England			League		FA Cup		League Cup		Europe		Total	
Leeds United (loan)	2002–03	Premier League	17	1								
Germany			League		DFB-Pokal		DFB Ligapokal		Europe		Total	
Bayer Leverkusen	2003–04	Bundesliga	11	0								
Bayer Leverkusen	2004–05	Bundesliga	0	0								
Sweden			League		Svenska Cupen		League Cup		Europe		Total	
BK Häcken	2005	Allsvenskan	21	1								
BK Häcken	2006	Allsvenskan	25	6								
BK Häcken	2007	Superettan	24	1								
IF Elfsborg	2008	Allsvenskan	29	2								
IF Elfsborg	2009	Allsvenskan	25	1								
IF Elfsborg	2010	Allsvenskan	12	0								
Sweden			383	30								
Italy			9	0								
England			17	1								
Germany			11	0								
Total			320	31								

=== International ===
Appearances and goals by national team and year

National team	Year	Apps	Goals
Sweden	1995	5	0
Sweden	1996	5	0
Sweden	1997	4	0
Sweden	1998	6	0
Sweden	1999	6	0
Sweden	2000	6	0
Sweden	2001	7	0
Sweden	2002	9	0
Sweden	2003	8	0
Sweden	2004	11	0
Sweden	2005	11	0
Sweden	2006	8	0
Total		86	0

== Honours ==
IFK Göteborg

- Allsvenskan: 1996

Sweden

- FIFA World Cup third place: 1994
