= Stefan Ishizaki =

Swedish footballer (born 1982)

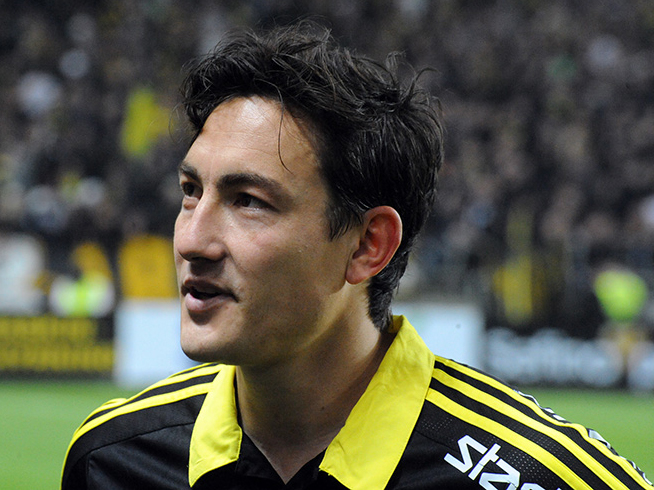
- Stefan Ishizaki in 2015

Personal information
- Full name: Stefan Daisuke Ishizaki
- Date of birth: 15 May 1982 (age 44)
- Place of birth: Stockholm, Sweden
- Height: 1.80 m (5 ft 11 in)
- Position: Attacking midfielder

Youth career
- Rågsveds
- AIK

Senior career*
Years	Team	Apps	(Gls)
1999–2004	AIK	103	(17)
2004	→ Genoa (loan)	4	(0)
2005	Vålerenga	15	(2)
2006–2013	Elfsborg	183	(48)
2014–2015	LA Galaxy	50	(6)
2015–2017	AIK	59	(6)
2018–2019	Elfsborg	47	(3)
Total		461	(82)

International career
1997–1999	Sweden U16	29	(4)
2000	Sweden U18	3	(1)
2001–2004	Sweden U21	21	(5)
2001–2012	Sweden	13	(0)
- * Club domestic league appearances and goals as of 17 May 2018

Stefan Daisuke Ishizaki (Japanese: ステファン 大輔 石崎; born 15 May 1982) is a Swedish former professional footballer who played as a midfielder. Starting off his career with AIK in the late 1990s, he went on to represent Genoa, Vålerenga, and LA Galaxy before retiring at Elfsborg in 2019. A full international between 2001 and 2012, he won 13 caps for the Sweden national team.

== Club career ==
=== AIK ===
Born to a Swedish mother and a Japanese father, he started his career with Rågsveds and stayed with the club until 1999 when he signed a contract with major Swedish club AIK. He made his debut for the club in the same year in Svenska Cupen as he came on as a substitute in the 80th minute against Gefle, he later came on as a substitute again in the final, which AIK won 1–0 against Göteborg, making him the youngest in the country to win the Cup, being only 16 years and 364 days old.

His league debut was not until the 2000 season against his future club Elfsborg. He quickly established himself as a starting lineup player and really broke through as a player against Helsingborg, a 4–1 victory, scoring a goal and making two assists. He missed out the first game of the 2001 season due to an injury he got during the pre-season, which would continue to haunt him for the rest of the season, but he fully recovered for the 2002 season. Prior to the 2004 season, he was loaned out to Italian Serie B club Genoa over the spring part of the season, later when AIK was relegated to Superettan he signed with Norwegian club Vålerenga.

=== Genoa ===
During the winterbreak of the 2003–04 season Genoa signed Ishizaki on loan until the end of the season. Ishizaki did not play many games for the club, before returning to AIK. Genoa also had an option to buy the player, but it was never used.

=== Vålerenga ===
Instead of following AIK down into Superettan, Ishizaki decided to sign with Norwegian club Vålerenga, helping the club to break rivals Rosenborg’s 13 straight league wins, bringing the title back to the club for the first time since 1984.

=== Elfsborg ===
Stefan Ishizaki returned to Sweden prior to the 2006 season, signing for Elfsborg. Being a major signing for the coming season, he helped the club to claim the league title at the end of the season.

After his successful first season, he remained with Elfsborg, taking a medal every season, gold (1st) in 2006, bronze (4th) in 2007, the Stora Silvret (2nd) in 2008, Lilla Silvret in 2009 (3rd) and bronze (4th) in 2010. Prior to the 2010 season he signed a new 5-year contract with the club.

=== LA Galaxy ===
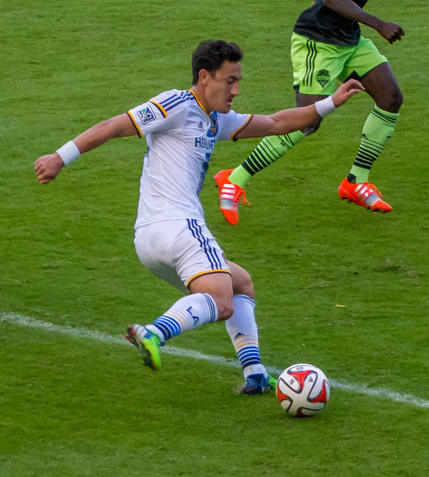
Ishizaki with the Galaxy

Stefan Ishizaki signed with the LA Galaxy in Major League Soccer before camps opened in January for the 2014 season. While at the Galaxy, he won the 2014 MLS Cup where he was a starter in the final. Ishizaki was released by the club on 4 July 2015 so he could return to Sweden to finish his career to be with his expectant wife.

=== Return to AIK ===
On 10 July 2015, it was confirmed that Ishizaki signed a 2.5 year deal with AIK. After the 2017 AIK season, Ishizaki left AIK upon the expiration of his contract.

=== Return to Elfsborg and retirement ===
Ishizaki signed for Elfsborg on a free transfer ahead of the 2018 Allsvenskan season. At the end of the 2019 season, Ishizaki announced his retirement from professional football.

== International career ==
Born to a Japanese father and a Swedish mother, Ishizaki was eligible to play internationally for both Sweden as well as Japan. In the early 2000s, Ishizaki turned down an offer to represent the Japan national team.

He represented Sweden at the U17, U19, and U21 levels, and was a squad player for the Sweden U21 team at the 2004 UEFA European Under-21 Championship. Sweden was eliminated by the Serbia and Montenegro U21 team in the semifinals after penalty kicks despite Ishizaki successfully converting his penalty kick.

On the senior level Ishizaki won 13 caps for the Sweden national team between 2001 and 2012 but never featured in a major tournament.

== Career statistics ==
=== Club ===
As of 13 November 2019

Club Performance		League		Cup		Other Cups		Continental		Total	
Club	Season	Apps	Goals	Apps	Goals	Apps	Goals	Apps	Goals	Apps	Goals
Sweden		Allsvenskan		Svenska Cupen		Other Cups		UEFA		Total	
AIK	2000	21	3	0	0	0	0	–		21	3
AIK	2001	18	3	0	0	0	0	–		18	3
AIK	2002	25	5	0	0	0	0	4	0	29	5
AIK	2003	24	2	0	0	0	0	4	0	28	2
AIK	2004	15	4	0	0	0	0	0	0	15	4
AIK	Total	103	17	0	0	0	0	8	0	111	17
Italy		Serie B		Coppa Italia		Other Cups		UEFA		Total	
Genoa (loan)	2003–04	4	0	0	0	0	0	–		4	0
Genoa (loan)	Total	4	0	0	0	0	0	–		4	0
Norway		Tippeligaen		Norgesmesterskapet		Other Cups		UEFA		Total	
Vålerenga	2005	15	2	0	0	10	2	4	0	29	4
Vålerenga	Total	15	2	0	0	10	2	4	0	29	4
Sweden		Allsvenskan		Svenska Cupen		Other Cups		UEFA		Total	
Elfsborg	2006	25	4	0	0	7	1	–		32	5
Elfsborg	2007	25	8	0	0	1	0	11	1	37	9
Elfsborg	2008	21	8	0	0	5	0	2	0	28	8
Elfsborg	2009	22	6	1	0	0	0	6	1	29	7
Elfsborg	2010	13	6	0	0	0	0	5	2	18	8
Elfsborg	2011	25	6	3	0	0	0	5	0	33	6
Elfsborg	2012	25	8	0	0	0	0	5	0	30	8
Elfsborg	2013	27	2	2	0	0	0	11	0	40	2
Elfsborg	Total	183	48	6	0	13	1	45	4	247	53
United States		MLS		US Open Cup		Other Cups		CONCACAF		Total	
LA Galaxy	2014	30	5	2	0	–		–		32	5
LA Galaxy	2015	20	1	0	0	–		–		20	1
LA Galaxy	Total	50	6	2	0	–		–		52	6
Sweden		Allsvenskan		Svenska Cupen		Other Cups		UEFA		Total	
AIK	2015	9	1	0	0	–		4	1	13	2
AIK	2016	27	4	0	0	–		6	0	33	4
AIK	2017	23	1	4	0	–		6	1	33	2
AIK	Total	59	6	4	0	0	0	16	2	79	8
Elfsborg	2018	26	1	2	0	–		–		28	1
Elfsborg	2019	21	2	0	0	–		–		21	2
Elfsborg	Total	47	3	2	0	–		–		49	3
Career total		461	83	10	0	23	3	73	6	571	91

=== International ===
Appearances and goals by national team and year
National team	Year	Apps	Goals
Sweden	2001	1	0
Sweden	2002	0	0
Sweden	2003	4	0
Sweden	2004	0	0
Sweden	2005	1	0
Sweden	2006	2	0
Sweden	2007	2	0
Sweden	2008	1	0
Sweden	2009	0	0
Sweden	2010	1	0
Sweden	2011	0	0
Sweden	2012	1	0
Total		13	0

== Honours ==
AIK

- Svenska Cupen: 1999

Vålerenga

- Eliteserien: 2005

Elfsborg

- Allsvenskan: 2006, 2012

LA Galaxy

- MLS Cup: 2014
- Western Conference: 2014

Sweden

- King's Cup: 2003
