= Hans Bergh =

Swedish footballer (born 1970)

Personal information
- Date of birth: 6 June 1970 (age 56)
- Place of birth: Sundsvall, Sweden
- Height: 1.76 m (5 ft 9 in)
- Position: Midfielder

Senior career*
Years	Team	Apps	(Gls)
1988–1994	IFK Sundsvall	114	(8)
1994–1996	Hammarby IF	44	(2)
1996–1998	Degerfors IF	45	(2)
1998	Helsingborg	9	(0)
1998–2001	AIK	33	(1)
2001–2006	GIF Sundsvall	99	(3)
2006–2007	IFK Sundsvall		
2007	IFK Timrå		

International career^{‡}
1998	Sweden	2	(0)
- * Club domestic league appearances and goals as of 26 October 2017 (UTC) ‡ National team caps and goals as of 26 October (UTC)

Hans Bergh (born 6 June 1970) is a Swedish retired footballer. During his club career, Bergh played for IFK Sundsvall, Hammarby IF, Degerfors IF, Helsingborg, AIK, GIF Sundsvall and IFK Timrå. He made two appearances for the Sweden national team.

== Honours ==
- Allsvenskan: 1998
- Svenska Cupen: 1997-98, 1998-99
