= Jon Jönsson =

Swedish footballer (born 1983)

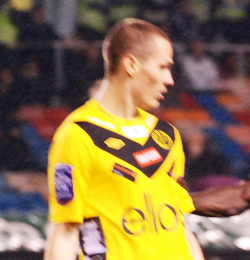
- Jönsson in 2012

Personal information
- Full name: Jon Martin Olof Jönsson
- Date of birth: 8 July 1983 (age 43)
- Place of birth: Hässleholm, Sweden
- Height: 1.82 m (6 ft 0 in)
- Position: Defender

Youth career
- –1999: IFK Hässleholm
- 1999–2000: Tottenham Hotspur
- 2001: Malmö FF

Senior career*
| Years | Team | Apps | (Gls) |
| 2001–2006 | Malmö FF | 59 | (3) |
| 2005 | → Landskrona BoIS (loan) | 21 | (3) |
| 2006–2007 | IF Elfsborg | 26 | (5) |
| 2007–2008 | Toulouse | 1 | (0) |
| 2008–2010 | Brøndby IF | 24 | (2) |
| 2010–2019 | IF Elfsborg | 135 | (7) |
| Total | | 266 | (20) |

International career
| 2000 | Sweden U17 | 12 | (2) |
| 2002–2005 | Sweden U21 | 27 | (5) |
- * Club domestic league appearances and goals

Jon Martin Olof Jönsson (born 8 July 1983) is a Swedish former professional footballer who played as a defender.

== Career ==
Jönsson made his first team debut in IFK Hässleholm aged 15, and his talent was recognised by Tottenham Hotspur who brought him to London. In return IFK Hässleholm received roughly £70,000 and two players to play one season on loan, Alton Thelwell and Peter Crouch.

Jönsson started his career as an offensive midfielder, but in the beginning of 2006 was retrained as a central defender. He adapted very well to his new position, and was voted the best central defender in Allsvenskan in 2006, by the managers of Allsvenskan. At the end of the year, he was included in the Sweden men's national team squad, but prevented from playing per an injury.

In June 2007 Jönsson agreed a contract with Ligue 1 team Toulouse FC. He left the club after only one season because he struggled to get a place on the first team. He signed a four-year contract with Danish club Brøndby IF on 26 June 2008. Jönsson left Brøndby on 18 June 2010, after having signed a 4 1/2-year contract with IF Elfsborg.

He retired from professional football in 2019.

== Honours ==
Malmö FF

- Allsvenskan: 2004

IF Elfsborg

- Allsvenskan: 2006, 2012
