= Johan Sjöberg =

Swedish footballer

Personal information
- Full name: Per Johan Sjöberg
- Date of birth: 14 November 1980 (age 45)
- Place of birth: Borås, Sweden
- Height: 1.85 m (6 ft 1 in)
- Position: Defender

Youth career
- –1997: Mariedals IK
- 1997: IF Elfsborg

Senior career*
Years	Team	Apps	(Gls)
1997–2011	IF Elfsborg	143	(2)
2007	→ Fredrikstad FK (loan)	11	(0)
2009	→ Örgryte IS (loan)	2	(0)

International career^{‡}
2000	Sweden U21	6	(0)
- * Club domestic league appearances and goals as of 20 January 2011 ‡ National team caps and goals as of 20 January 2011

Per Johan Sjöberg (born 14 November 1980) is a Swedish retired footballer who played as a defender. His last club was IF Elfsborg.

== Club career ==
=== Youth years ===
Sjöberg played for Mariedals IK until 1997 when he left the club for IF Elfsborg.

=== IF Elfsborg ===
He was regular in the starting line-up until injuries enabled him to play. He was a former team captain as well.

== International career ==
In 2000, he played for the Swedish national under-21 football team.

== Personal life ==
Sjöberg is very popular with IF Elfsborg's supporters and is called Kapten Blod (Captain Blood).
