= Joakim Wulff =

Swedish footballer (born 1979)

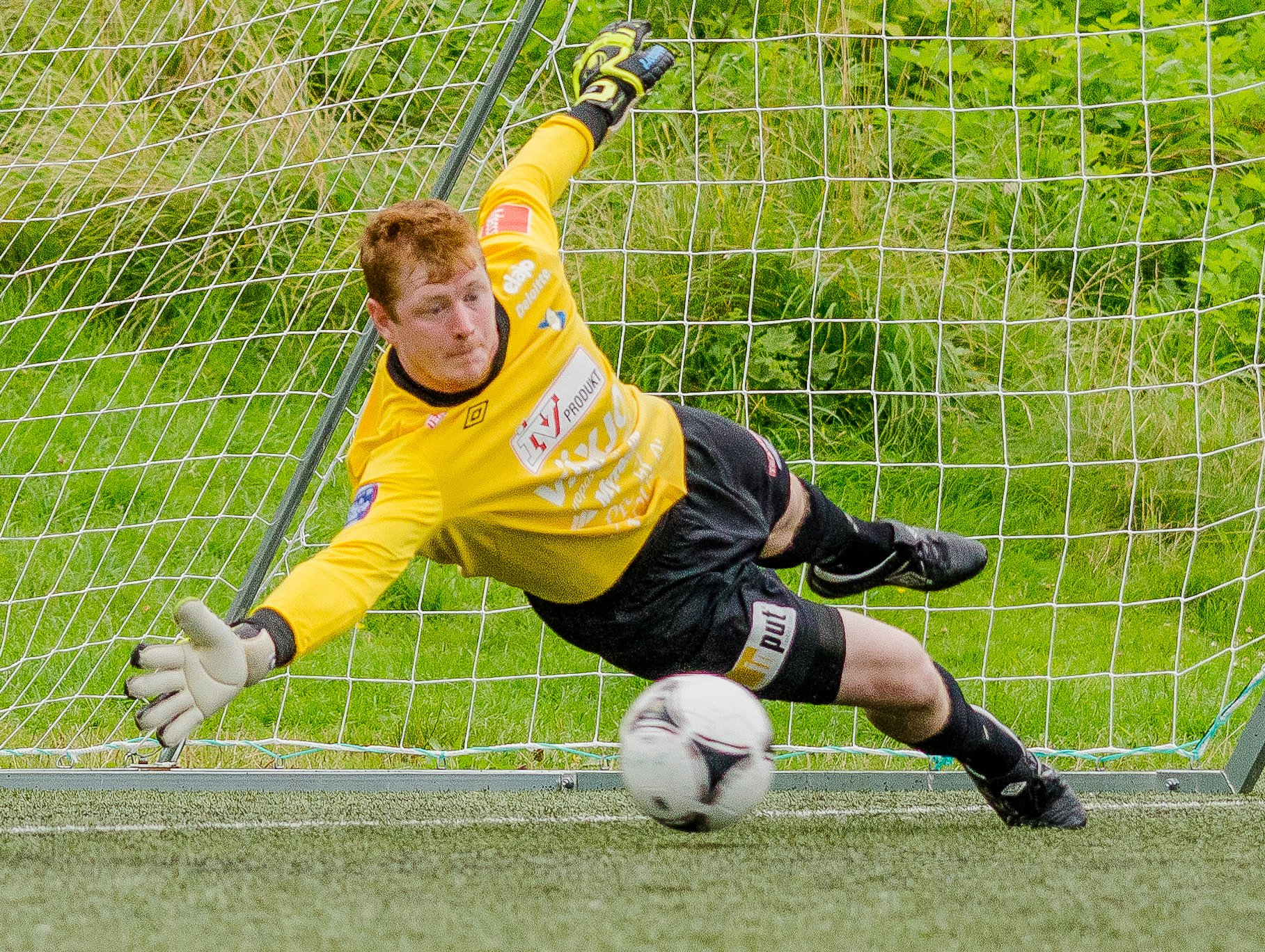

Personal information
- Date of birth: 6 February 1979 (age 47)
- Place of birth: Sweden
- Height: 1.85 m (6 ft 1 in)
- Position: Goalkeeper

Team information
- Current team: IFK Värnamo
- Number: 1

Youth career
- Veinge IF

Senior career*
Years	Team	Apps	(Gls)
1998–2007	Laholms FK		
2008	Falkenbergs FF	3	(0)
2009–2011	IF Elfsborg	9	(0)
2011–2014	Östers IF	41	(0)
2014–2017	Varbergs BoIS	102	(0)
2018	IK Sirius	3	(0)
2018–	IFK Värnamo	6	(0)
- * Club domestic league appearances and goals as of 17 October 2018

Joakim Wulff (born 6 February 1979) is a Swedish footballer who plays as a goalkeeper for IFK Värnamo in Superettan.
