= Daniel Nordmark =

Swedish footballer (born 1988)

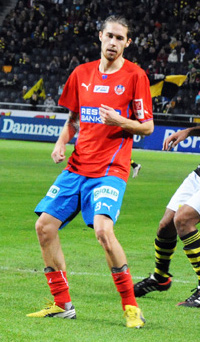
- Nordmark with Helsingborgs IF

Personal information
- Full name: Karl Daniel Nordmark
- Date of birth: 4 January 1988 (age 38)
- Place of birth: Lidköping, Sweden
- Height: 1.83 m (6 ft 0 in)
- Position: Midfielder

Youth career
- –2003: Lidköpings IF
- 2004–2005: IF Heimer
- 2006–2007: IF Elfsborg

Senior career*
Years	Team	Apps	(Gls)
2008–2011	IF Elfsborg	76	(8)
2012–2014	Helsingborgs IF	40	(6)
2014–2016	Örebro SK	54	(5)
Total		170	(19)

International career
2004–2005	Sweden U17	5	(0)
2009–2010	Sweden U21	10	(1)
- * Club domestic league appearances and goals

Karl Daniel Nordmark (born 4 January 1988) is a Swedish former professional footballer who played as a midfielder.

== Club career ==
=== Youth years ===
Nordmark played for Lidköpings IF and IF Heimer until 2001 when he left the club for IF Elfsborg.

=== IF Elfsborg ===
Nordmark made his first team debut in Elfsborg's 0–0 draw away at Hammarby IF on 23 April 2008. Nordmark was not offered a new contract after the 2011 season.

== International career ==
Nordmark represented Sweden at youth level.

== Personal life ==
Nordmark is a fan of Italian Serie A and his favourite team is A.S. Roma.
