= Mathias Florén =

Swedish footballer

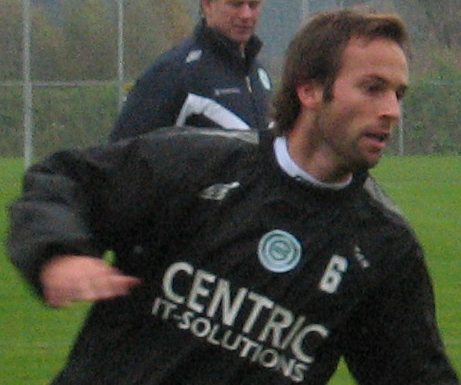
- Florén in 2006

Personal information
- Full name: Lars Mathias Florén
- Date of birth: 11 August 1976 (age 50)
- Place of birth: Söderhamn, Sweden
- Height: 1.79 m (5 ft 10 in)
- Position: Left back

Senior career*
Years	Team	Apps	(Gls)
1991–1993	Marma	43	(19)
1993–1995	Alnö	36	(2)
1995–1997	Sundsvall	48	(11)
1997–2001	Norrköping	122	(4)
2001–2007	Groningen	151	(1)
2007–2010	Elfsborg	67	(3)
2011–2014	Norrköping	80	(0)
2014	→ IF Sylvia (loan)	10	(0)
2015–2017	IF Sylvia	13	(0)

International career^{‡}
1998	Sweden U21	3	(0)
2001	Sweden	2	(0)

Managerial career
- 2015–2017: IFK Norrköping (Asst manager)
- 2018–2020: IFK Norrköping (U19)
- 2021–: IFK Norrköping (Asst manager)
- * Club domestic league appearances and goals as of 23 February 2021 ‡ National team caps and goals as of 20 October 2002

Lars Mathias Florén (born 11 August 1976) is a Swedish former professional footballer who played as a left back.

During his career, he represented Alnö IF, GIF Sundsvall, IFK Norrköping, FC Groningen, IF Elfsborg, and IF Sylvia. In 2001, he won two caps for the Sweden men's national football team.
