= James Keene (footballer) =

English footballer

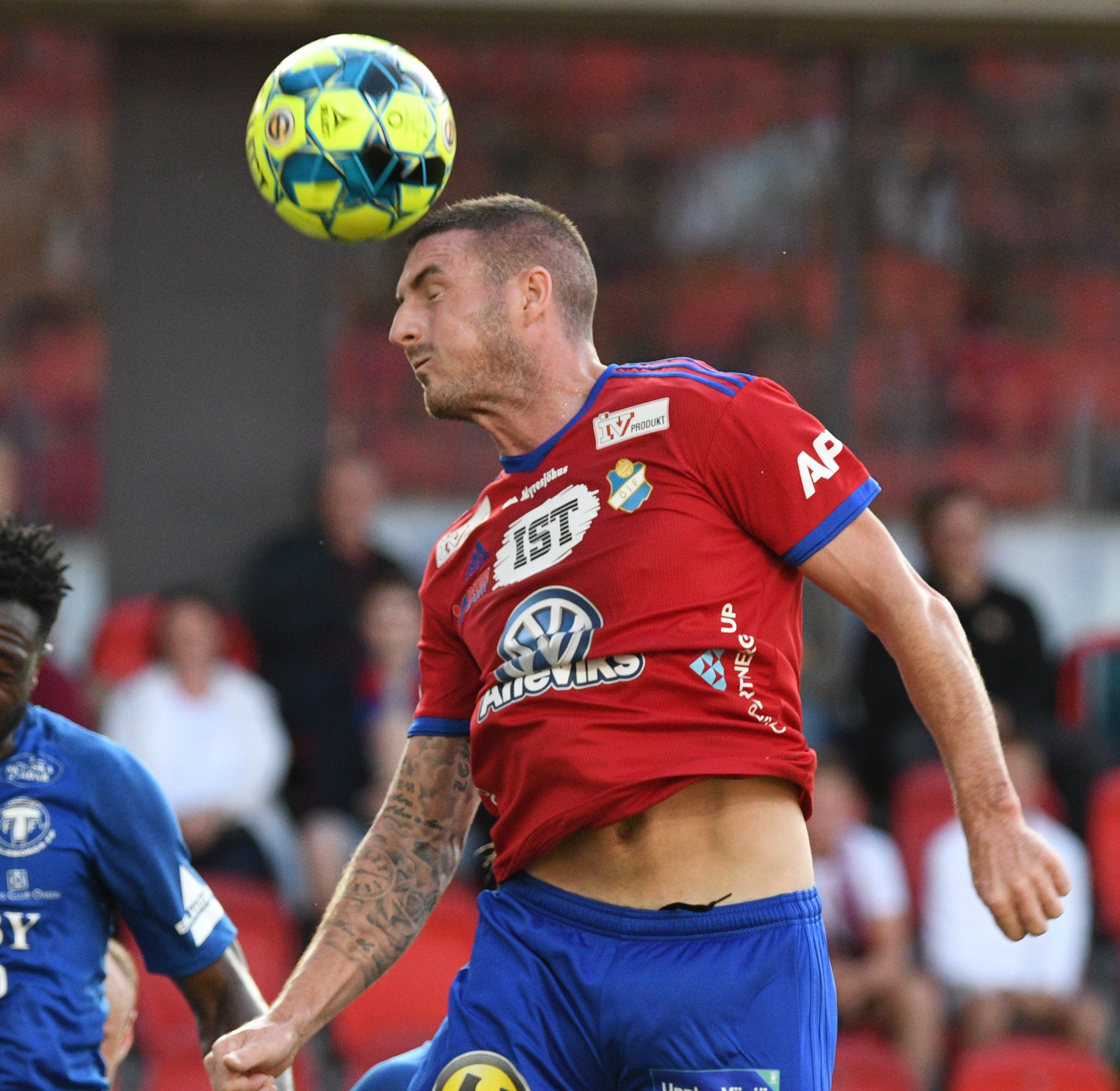

Personal information
- Full name: James Duncan Keene
- Date of birth: 26 December 1985 (age 40)
- Place of birth: Wells, England
- Height: 1.80 m (5 ft 11 in)
- Position: Striker

Youth career
- Wells City
- Portsmouth

Senior career*
Years	Team	Apps	(Gls)
2004–2006	Portsmouth	2	(0)
2004	→ Newbury (loan)		
2004–2005	→ Kidderminster (loan)	5	(0)
2005	→ AFC Bournemouth (loan)	11	(2)
2006	→ Boston United (loan)	6	(1)
2006	→ GAIS (loan)	24	(10)
2007–2013	IF Elfsborg	123	(25)
2011	→ Fredrikstad FK (loan)	9	(2)
2012	→ Djurgården (loan)	26	(6)
2013	→ Portsmouth (loan)	9	(1)
2014	Bnei Yehuda	14	(2)
2014	NorthEast United	10	(0)
2015	Halmstad	22	(4)
2016–2018	Bidvest Wits	39	(12)
2018–2019	SuperSport United	22	(3)
2019–2021	Östers IF	48	(8)
- * Club domestic league appearances and goals

James Duncan Keene (born 26 December 1985) is an English former footballer who played as a striker.

== Club career ==
=== Early career ===
Keene is a product of the Portsmouth youth scheme. After making his way through the ranks – including a successful 'work experience' loan at A.F.C. Newbury – he was loaned to Football League Two club Kidderminster Harriers, making his debut in a 2–0 defeat to Bristol Rovers. Keene was the Man of the Match for the visitors. He played five more games for Kidderminster, excelling during his loan period.

He was rewarded upon his return to Fratton Park with his first professional contract, to run until the summer of 2007.

Following his loan he broke into the first team squad, and played in the final two games of the 2004–05 season, making his debut against Bolton Wanderers in a 1–1 draw as a 60th-minute substitute. He started his next game against West Bromwich Albion. He then had two loans spells in the 2005–06 season. First he joined League 1 side AFC Bournemouth. It was there he scored his first career goal on 15 October 2005, a last minute winner as Bournemouth beat Colchester away from home by the single goal. Three days later he scored twice in a 4–1 win over Aldershot Town in the Football League Trophy. His fourth and final goal for the club came in a 2-0 league victory against Brentford. He then joined League 2 side Boston United, where he scored his first and only goal for the club in a 1–1 draw with Rochdale.

=== Sweden ===
Keene was loaned in March 2006 to GAIS for the Swedish 2006 Allsvenskan. Keene scored the first goal of the season for GAIS in the Allsvenskan in the Gothenburg derby against Örgryte IS. He finished the season as the club's top scorer with 10 goals in 24 league appearances, and following his success he was at the end of the season transferred to the Swedish champions IF Elfsborg, signing a five-year contract with them. Keene has been an integral member of the club's Champions League campaigns.

Keene was on loan to the Norwegian Tippeligaen team Fredrikstad FK during the latter part of the 2011 season. He then returned to Elfsborg, and was loaned to Djurgården for 2012 season.

Keene has recently become a Swedish citizen and is fluent in the language.

=== Return to Portsmouth ===
On 10 January 2013, Keene signed a one-month loan deal with Portsmouth, his former club. He made his debut on 26 January, against Hartlepool United. He scored his first Pompey goal on 2 February, against Colchester United. He returned to Elfsborg on 2 March, after the game against Crewe Alexandra, in which Portsmouth managed to get a win.

=== Return to Sweden ===
On 24 April 2015, Keene joined Allsvenskan side Halmstad.

=== Bidvest Wits ===
On 1 January 2016, Bidvest Wits of the South African Premier Division announced that Keene had signed for them. On 14 May 2018, it was announced that he would join SuperSport United for the 2018–19 season.

In July 2019, Keene returned to Sweden once again to sign for Superettan side Öster.

== International career ==
Uncapped by England, Keene expressed his interest in playing for the Sweden national team. He became eligible in 2012.

== Career statistics ==
As of match played 1 April 2016

Appearances and goals by club, season and competition
Club	Season	League			National Cup		League Cup		Continental		Other		Total	
Club	Season	Division	Apps	Goals	Apps	Goals	Apps	Goals	Apps	Goals	Apps	Goals	Apps	Goals
Portsmouth	2004–05	Premier League	2	0	0	0	0	0	-		-		2	0
Portsmouth	2005–06	Premier League	0	0	0	0	0	0	-		-		0	0
Portsmouth	Total		2	0	0	0	0	0	-	-	-	-	2	0
Kidderminster Harriers (loan)	2004–05	League Two	5	0	1	0	0	0	-		-		6	0
AFC Bournemouth (loan)	2005–06	League One	11	2	1	0	1	0	-		1	2	14	4
Boston United (loan)	2005–06	League Two	6	1	0	0	0	0	-		-		6	1
GAIS (loan)	2006	Allsvenskan	24	10			-		-		-		24	10
IF Elfsborg	2007	Allsvenskan	24	4			-		6	0	-		24	4
IF Elfsborg	2008	Allsvenskan	9	3			-		1	0	-		9	3
IF Elfsborg	2009	Allsvenskan	27	8	2	0	-		4	2	-		29	8
IF Elfsborg	2010	Allsvenskan	25	4	2	0	-		6	2	-		27	4
IF Elfsborg	2011	Allsvenskan	14	1	2	0	-		4	1	-		16	1
IF Elfsborg	2012	Allsvenskan	0	0	0	0	-		-		-		0	0
IF Elfsborg	2013	Allsvenskan	24	5	0	0	-		9	1	-		24	5
IF Elfsborg	Total		123	25			-	-	30	6	-	-	99	20
Fredrikstad (loan)	2011	Tippeligaen	9	2	1	0	-		-		-		10	2
Djurgården (loan)	2012	Allsvenskan	26	6	1	0	-		-		-		27	6
Portsmouth (loan)	2012–13	League One	9	1	0	0	0	0	-		-		9	1
Bnei Yehuda	2013–14	Ligat HaAl	15	2	0	0	0	0	-		-		15	2
NorthEast United	2014	Indian Super League	10	0	-		-		-		-		10	0
Halmstad	2015	Allsvenskan	22	4	0	0	-		-		-		22	4
Bidvest Wits	2015–16	Premier Soccer League	10	7	2	1	0	0	-		-		12	8
Career total			272	60			1	0	30	6	1	2	304	68

== Honours ==
Individual

- Årets Järnkamin: 2012.

Bidvest Wits

- Premier Soccer League:2016–17
- Mtn 8:2016
- Telkom Knockout:2017-18
