= Emir Bajrami =

Swedish footballer (born 1988)

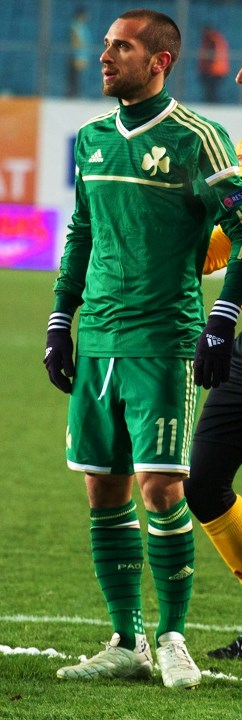

Personal information
- Full name: Burim Emir Bajrami
- Date of birth: 7 March 1988 (age 38)
- Place of birth: Pristina, SFR Yugoslavia
- Height: 1.80 m (5 ft 11 in)
- Position: Winger

Youth career
- Köping FF

Senior career*
Years	Team	Apps	(Gls)
2005	Köping FF	12	(5)
2006–2010	IF Elfsborg	83	(14)
2010–2013	Twente	43	(5)
2012–2013	→ Monaco (loan)	10	(1)
2013	→ Monaco B	5	(2)
2013–2015	Panathinaikos	12	(1)
2015–2018	IF Elfsborg	45	(2)
Total		210	(30)

International career
2006–2007	Sweden U19	12	(1)
2007–2010	Sweden U21	25	(5)
2010–2012	Sweden	18	(2)
- * Club domestic league appearances and goals

Emir Bajrami (born 7 March 1988) is a former professional footballer who played as a winger. Starting off his professional career with IF Elfsborg in 2006, he went on to represent FC Twente, AS Monaco, and Panathinaikos before retiring at Elfsborg in 2018. Born in Kosovo, he won 18 caps for the Sweden national team and was included in the squad for UEFA Euro 2012. He is the joint Assistant Manager of Aberdeen FC.

== Club career ==
=== IF Elfsborg ===
Growing up in Sweden, Bajrami began playing football when he was about eight or nine years old. This resulted in Bajrami joining Köping FF and progressed his career at the club, he made twelve appearances and scoring five times professionally. It was announced that the player would be moving to Elfsborg at the end of the 2005 season. He made his debut for the club, coming on as an 83rd-minute substitute, in a 3–0 win against GAIS on 30 July 2006. Despite making his only appearance of the 2006 season, the season saw IF Elfsborg win the league for the first time since 1961.

The 2007 season proved to be a breakthrough season for Bajrami. He made his first appearance of the season against Helsingborg in the Svenska Supercupen, coming on as a 68th-minute substitute, in a 1–0 win, marking Bajrami's first achievement in his football career. He scored on his first Allsvenskan start for IF Elfsborg, as the club drew 1–1 against Örebro SK on 17 April 2007. Following this, Bajrami found his playing time, mostly coming from the substitute bench throughout the 2007 season. He then made his UEFA Champions League debut, coming on as a 79th-minute substitute, in a 1–0 win against Debreceni. Although Bajrami appeared as an unused substitute in the return leg, IF Elfsborg went through to the next round after a 0–0 draw, resulting in the club going through to the next round following a 1–0 win on aggregate. It was announced on 20 August 2007 that he signed a contract with IF Elfsborg, keeping him until 2011. At the end of the 2007 season, Bajrami went on to make twenty–one appearances and scoring once in all competitions.

In the 2008 season, Bajrami started the season well when he scored his first goal of the season, in a 1–1 draw against Malmö on 10 April 2008. Following this, Bajrami established himself in the first team, playing in the left–wing position for the rest of the season. Between 6 July 2008 and 23 July 2008, he scored four goals in four matches, both from the UEFA Cup against Hibernian and the league against Halmstad and Norrköping. In a match against Ljungskile on 1 September 2008, Bajrami then set up two goals, in a 4–0 win. As the 2008 season progressed, he scored two more goals later in the season against Malmö and Halmstads. However, the club failed to win the league once again after finishing second place behind Kalmar. Despite missing three matches during the 2008 season, he went on to score seven goals in thirty–five appearances in all competitions. Following this, Bajrami signed a contract extension with the club, keeping him until 2013.

At the start of the 2009 season, Bajrami started the season well when he scored against Kalmar on 16 April 2009. Nine days later on 25 April 2009, Bajrami scored again in a 2–1 win over Ljungskile in the third round of the Svenska Cupen. He then scored his third goal of the season, in a 2–0 win against IFK Göteborg on 4 May 2009. Since the 2009 season, Bajrami continued to establish himself in the starting eleven, playing in the left–wing position. His performance attracted interests from Serie A side Parma throughout the summer transfer window. In response, IF Elsborg said that they have no concern on selling the player. Eventually, he ended up staying at the club despite interests from Parma. Between 6 July 2009 and 19 July 2009, Bajrami scored four goals in three matches against Örgryte, Helsingborg (twice) and Djurgården. Eleven days later on 30 July 2009, he scored in a third round of the UEFA Europa League first leg, in a 2–1 win over Braga. In the return leg, Bajrami helped IF Elfsborg beat Braga 2–0 to advance to the next round. He later helped the club finish third place in the league. Despite suffering from injuries during the 2009 season, Bajrami went on to make twenty–nine appearances and scoring five times in all competitions.

Ahead of the 2010 season, Bajrami continued to be linked with a move to clubs, such as, Sporting CP. But he ended up staying at IF Elfsborg after dismissing of leaving the club in the January transfer window. However, Bajrami missed the opening game of the season against Gefle, due to an illness. But he made his return to the starting line–up against Halmstad in a follow–up, as IF Elfsborg won 6–0. Since returning from injury, Bajrami continued to regain his first team place, playing in the left–wing position. He then set up two goals in two matches between 11 April 2010 and 15 April 2010 against Helsingborgs and Djurgårdens. Ten days later on 25 April 2010, Bajrami scored his first goal of the season, in a 4–1 win against Trelleborg. He then scored his second goal of the season, in a 2–0 win against GAIS on 16 May 2010, which turned out to be his last appearance for the club. By then, Bajrami made fourteen appearances and scoring two times in all competitions.

=== FC Twente ===
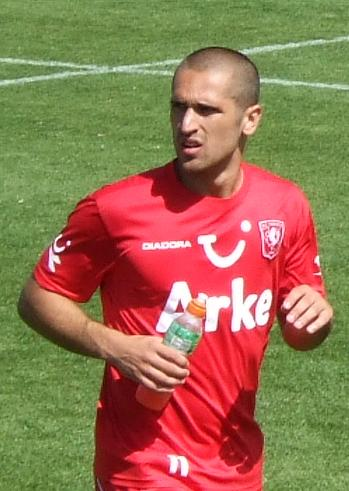
Bajrami playing for Twente.

On 25 May 2010, Bajrami signed for Eredivisie side Twente, signing a four–year contract with the club. The fee was reported to be 2.5 million euros, while Swedish based newspaper Expressen estimated the fee was 35 million SEK, which would increase to 15 million based on his appearance at Twente and 25% of the clause should he leave the club.

Bajrami made his FC Twente debut, starting a match and played 81 minutes before being substituted, as he helped the club beat Ajax 1–0 to win the Johan Cruyff Shield. In the opening game of the season, Bajrami made his league debut, starting a match and played for 69 minutes before being substituted, in a 0–0 draw against Roda JC. A month later on 14 September 2010, Bajrami made his UEFA Champions League debut in the Group Stage against Inter Milan, coming on as a 78th-minute substitute, in a 2–2 draw He then made his first UEFA Champions League start against Tottenham Hotspur on 29 September 2010. During the match, however, Bajrami suffered an ankle injury and was substituted in the first half as a result. Following a surgery, it was announced that he would be out for the rest of the year. After making his return from injury, Bajrami made his return to the first team on 19 January 2011, where he came on as a substitute in the second half, in a 5–0 win over Heracles Almelo. After the match, Bajrami continued to be involved in a number of matches in the first team. A month later on 20 February 2011, he scored his first goal for FC Twente in a 1–1 draw against NEC. Two months later on 14 April 2011, Bajrami scored again in the second leg of the quarter final of the Europa League, in a 3–1 loss against Villarreal. Although the club were unsuccessful to win the league again after losing 3–1 against Ajax in the last game of the season, he was featured in the final of the KNVB Cup against Ajax, coming on as a 91st-minute substitute in extra time and helped FC Twente win 3–2. In his first season at Twente, Bajrami finished the season, making thirty–two appearances and scoring two times in all competitions.

At the start of the 2011–12 season, Bajrami suffered a setback when he suffered an injury at the start of the season. Bajrami made his return from injury against NAC Breda in the opening game of the season, coming on as a 66th-minute substitute, in a 1–0 win. Two weeks later on 20 August 2011, he scored his first goal of the season, in a 5–1 win over Heerenveen. After missing out one game, due to illness, Bajrami scored on his return from injury on 18 September 2011 after coming on as a substitute in the second half, in a 5–2 win over ADO Den Haag. Following this, he continued to be involved in a number of matches in the first team throughout the 2011–12 season. He then scored in the Europa League match on 20 October 2011, in a 4–1 win over Odense Boldklub, which was followed up by scoring twice six days later, in the third round of the KNVB Cup, in a 4–3 win over Genemuiden. After missing one due to illness in late–December, Bajrami scored on his return from the sidelines, as well as, setting one of FC Twente's goals, in a 5–2 win over RKC Waalwijk on 21 January 2012. However, his return was short–lived when he suffered a foot injury that kept him out for a week. But he made his return from injury against Steaua București in the first leg of the UEFA Europa League on 16 February 2012, coming on as a 75th-minute substitute, in a 1–0 win. Following his return from injury, Bajrami found his playing time, mostly coming from the substitute bench. Despite this, he scored his third goal of the season on 11 April 2012, in a 2–2 draw against AZ Alkmaar. At the end of the 2011–12 season, Bajrami went on to make thirty–eight appearances and scoring seven times in all competitions.

=== AS Monaco ===
After announcing his desire to leave Twente, Bajrami joined Ligue 2 side Monaco on a season long loan deal for the remainder of the 2012–13 season. Upon joining the club, Bajrami revealed that he turned down a move to La Liga side Deportivo de La Coruña to join Monaco.

Bajrami made his AS Monaco debut, in the opening game of the season, where he came on as a substitute in the second half, in a 4–0 win over Tours in the opening game of the season. Two weeks later on 10 August 2012, he scored his first goal for the club, in a 3–2 win over Istres. However, Bajrami struggled in the first team throughout the season, resulting in him making thirteen appearances and scoring once in all competitions.

=== Panathinaikos ===
On 4 June 2013, Bajrami signed a three-year contract with Greek side Panathinaikos. Upon joining the club, Bajrami said the move to Panathinaikos could resurrected his career, having lost his place at the national team and was given a number eleven shirt for the new season.

Bajrami made his Panathinaikos debut, in the opening game of the season, where he made his first start and played the whole game, in a 2–0 win over Panetolikos. However, Bajrami's time at the club was plagued when he suffered an injury that saw him out for months, as well as, losing his first team place. After returning to training from injury, Bajrami made his return to the first team against Veria on 19 January 2014, coming on as a 67th-minute substitute, in a 3–1 win. Ten days later on 29 January 2014, he scored his first goal for the club, in the quarter final of Greek Cup, in a 4–0 win over Olympiacos Volos. However, his return was short–lived when Bajrami suffered another injury that kept him out for the rest of the 2013–14 season. At the end of the 2013–14 season, he finished his first season at the club, making ten appearances and scoring once in all competitions.

At the start of the 2014–15 season, Bajrami continued to recovery from his injury that he sustained last season. His first appearance of the season came on 14 September 2014 against AEL Kalloni, coming on as a second-half substitute, in a 1–0 win. A month later on 30 October 2014, he set up two goals for the club, in a 3–1 win against Panetolikos in the Group Stage of Kypello Elladas. However, Bajrami continued to face injury problems at Panathinaikos. Up until his injury, he made nine appearances in all competitions.

It was announced on 10 March 2015 that Panathinaikos terminated his contract. Reflecting on his release, Bajrami said: "I think I made the right decision. I need time and calm. "I want to be close to my family and friends in order to play football again at the level I can."

=== Return to IF Elfsborg ===
Shortly after leaving Panathinaikos, Bajrami returned to Sweden, where he joined Elfsborg for the second time of his career. However, Bajrami did not make an appearance for the club throughout the 2015 season, due to suffering from a back problems. Throughout 2015, Bajrami continued to rehabilitate from his injury and made his recovery by December. Shortly after, he signed a four-year contract with the club on 23 December 2015.

After a year signing for the club, Bajrami finally made his Elfsborg debut, coming on as a substitute, in a 4–2 loss against Nordsjælland in a friendly match on 22 January 2016. A month later on 27 February 2016, he made his first appearance of the season, coming on as a 73rd-minute substitute, in a 3–3 draw against IFK Värnamo in the Svenska Cupen match. Two months later on 3 April 2016, Bajrami made his first start for the club, starting a match and played 68 minutes before being substituted, in a 2–1 loss against BK Häcken in the opening game of the season. Since joining IF Elfsborg, he began to be involved in the first team in a number of matches. Bajrami scored his first Elfsborg goal since 2010 and set up another goal, in a 2–1 win over Falkenberg on 1 May 2016. However, he was plagued with injuries throughout the 2016 season. At the end of the 2016 season, Bajrami went on to make nineteen appearances and scoring once in all competitions.

The 2017 season saw Bajrami find his playing time, mostly coming from the substitute bench. However, he continued to be plagued with injuries throughout the season. Despite this, Bajrami scored his first goal of the season, in a 3–1 win against IFK Norrköping on 9 July 2017. A month later on 23 August 2017, he scored twice for the club, in a 4–3 win against Landskrona in the Svenska Cupen. At the end of the 2017 season, Bajrami went on to make twenty–four appearances and scoring two times in all competitions.

Bajrami made his first appearance of the 2018 season for the club against IF Brommapojkarna on 19 April 2018, coming on as a late substitute, in a 1–0 win. However, he continued to find his first team opportunities limited and found his playing time, mostly coming from the substitute bench. Bajrami retired from professional football after the 2018 season. It came after when he played his last match in professional football against IF Brommapojkarna on 5 November 2018, as IF Elfsborg lost 2–1. Following this, Bajrami moved to coaching and began working his former club, IF Elfsborg. Having coached the club's U19 and U21 team for the next two years, he was promoted as IF Elfsborg's assistant coach ahead of the 2020 season.

== International career ==
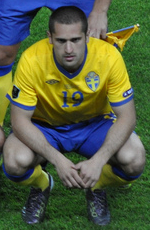
Bajrami playing for Sweden in 2010.

=== Early career ===
Bajrami started out his Sweden career when he played for Sweden U15, Sweden U16 and Sweden U17 for three years between 2003 and 2006.

In November 2005, Bajrami was called up for his debut in the Sweden U18 team. He made his debut for the U18 national team against USA U18 on 8 June 2006, starting a match and played 75 minutes before being substituted, in a 2–2 draw. It wasn't until on 7 September 2006 when Bajrami scored his first Sweden U18 goal, in a 1–1 draw against Czech Republic U18. He went on to make six appearances and scoring once for the U18 national team.

In October 2006, Bajrami was called up for his debut in the Sweden U19 team. He made his U19 national team debut, coming on as a 79th-minute substitute, in a 4–1 win against Faroe Islands U19 on 6 October 2006. Bajrami continued to make six more appearances for the U19 national team.

=== Sweden U21 ===
In October 2007, Bajrami was called up for his debut on the Sweden U21 team. He made his debut for the U21 national team against Republic of Ireland U21 on 12 October 2007, coming on as a 64th-minute substitute, in a 3–2 loss. In a follow–up match against Belgium U21, Bajrami scored his first goal for Sweden U21, in a 5–1 win. The next two years saw the player become a regular for the U21 national team, playing in the midfield position. During which, he scored two goals against Finland U21 and Netherlands U21.

In May 2009, Bajrami was included in Sweden for the UEFA European Under-21 Championship in Sweden. Prior to the start of the tournament, his place was under threat when he suffered an injury during a match against BK Häcken on 29 May 2009. But Bajrami made a quick recovery and was fit to be included in the squad. In a match against Estonia on 9 June 2009, he set up two goals for the U21 national team, in a 2–1 win. Bajrami made his tournament debut against Belarus U21 on 16 June 2009, starting a match and played 71 minutes before being substituted, in a 5–1 win. He then set up two goals for Marcus Berg against Serbia U21 on 23 June 2009, as Sweden U21 won 3–1 to advance to the next round. During the match, Bajrami was subjected of a racist taunts from the opposition players, prompting Tommy Söderberg to defend him. However, he appeared as an unused substitute against England U21 in the semi–finals, as the U21 national team were eliminated from the tournament following a penalty shootout defeat.

Two months later after the end of the tournament, Bajrami was recalled up to the Sweden U21 squad. He then scored two more goals for the U21 national team against Denmark U21 and Bulgaria U21. Bajrami then captained Sweden U21 three times for throughout 2010. He went on to make twenty–five appearances and scoring five times for the U21 national team.

=== Senior career ===
It was announced on 14 December 2009 that Bajrami was called up for his debut in the Sweden team. He made his Sweden debut, starting a match and played 64 minutes before being substituted, in a 1–0 win against Oman on 20 January 2010. In his fourth national appearance, Bajrami scored his first national team goal in a friendly game against Scotland on 11 August 2010. He then made two more starts for Sweden by the end of the year. In a match against Ukraine on 9 February 2011, Bajrami came on as a 60th-minute substitute and played the rest of the season, in which missed the penalty in the shootout, resulting a loss for the national team.

Four months later on 7 June 2011, Bajrami scored his second Sweden goal, in a 5–0 win over Finland. Later in the year, his involvement in the national team saw Sweden qualify for the UEFA Euro 2012. In May 2012, he was called up by the national team for the UEFA 2012 Three years before his call up, Expressen successfully predicted that Bajrami would be included in the Sweden squad for the tournament. Prior to the tournament, he set up the national team's third goal of the game for Christian Wilhelmsson, in a 3–2 win against Iceland on 30 May 2012. Having appeared twice as an unused substitute, Bajrami played once in the tournament, which was against France, but was eliminated from the tournament despite Sweden winning the match by two goals to nothing. Following the end of the tournament, he appeared once again, coming against Kazakhstan on 11 September 2012, coming on as a 56th-minute substitute, in a 2–0 win, in what turned out to be his last appearance for the national team.

In February 2014, Bajrami said he would pledge his international commitment to play for Kosovo in the near future, should the national side was accepted by FIFA.

== Personal life ==
Born in Pristina, SFR Yugoslavia, (which is now Kosovo), Bajrami's family moved to Sweden and grew up in Köping, along with his older brother, Ramush. As a result, Bajrami was granted Swedish citizenship, which meant that he was eligible to play for the national team in the future.

In addition to playing football, Bajrami played ice hockey and even played bandy as a teenager, where he was, at one point, selected for the national youth team, but rejected the offer in favour of playing football instead. Bajrami has tattoos, including an Albanian flag on the underside of his upper arm, saying: "Mostly so that people know that I do not forget my roots. I am and will always be Kosovo Albanian. I was born there." In September 2010, he signed a sponsorship with Adidas.

Bajrami is married.

== Career statistics ==
=== Club ===
Appearances and goals by club, season and competition
Club	Season	League			National cup		League cup		Europe		Other		Total	
Club	Season	Division	Apps	Goals	Apps	Goals	Apps	Goals	Apps	Goals	Apps	Goals	Apps	Goals
Elfsborg	2016	Allsvenskan	17	1	2	0	—		—		—		19	1
Elfsborg	2017	Allsvenskan	21	1	3	0	—		—		—		24	1
Elfsborg	2018	Allsvenskan	7	0	1	2	—		—		—		8	2
Elfsborg	Total		45	2	6	2	0	0	0	0	0	0	51	4
Career total			45	2	6	2	0	0	0	0	0	0	51	4

=== International ===
Appearances and goals by national team and year
National team	Year	Apps	Goals
Sweden	2010	3	1
Sweden	2011	8	1
Sweden	2012	5	0
Total		18	2

Scores and results list Sweden's goal tally first, score column indicates score after each Bajrami goal.

List of international goals scored by Emir Bajrami
No.	Date	Venue	Opponent	Score	Result	Competition	Ref.
1	11 August 2010	Råsunda Stadium, Solna, Sweden	Scotland	2–0	3–0	Friendly	
2	7 June 2011	Råsunda Stadium, Solna, Sweden	Finland	5–0	5–0	UEFA Euro 2012 qualifier	

== Honours ==
Twente

- KNVB Cup: 2010–11
- Johan Cruijff Schaal: 2010
