= Martin Andersson (footballer, born 1981) =

Swedish footballer

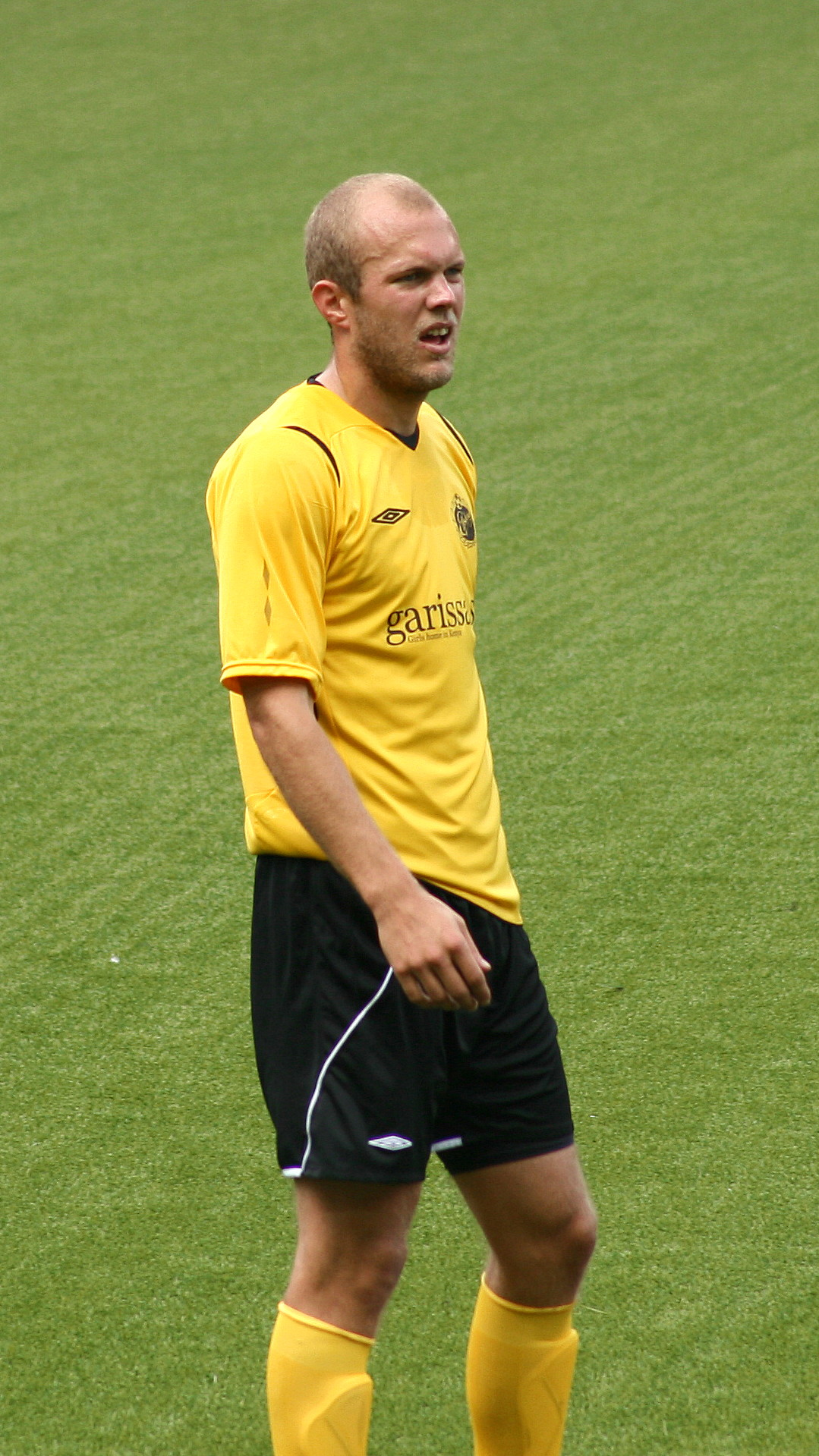

Personal information
- Full name: Karl Martin Andersson
- Date of birth: 16 January 1981 (age 45)
- Place of birth: Sweden
- Height: 1.88 m (6 ft 2 in)
- Position: Defender

Youth career
- Arentorps SK
- 1997–2000: IF Elfsborg

Senior career*
Years	Team	Apps	(Gls)
2000–2013	Elfsborg	198	(4)

International career
2000–2004	Sweden U21	10	(0)
- * Club domestic league appearances and goals

Martin Andersson (born 16 January 1981) is a Swedish retired footballer who played for IF Elfsborg as a defender.
