= Daniel Mobaeck =

Swedish footballer

Personal information
- Full name: Kent Daniel Mobaeck
- Date of birth: 22 May 1980 (age 46)
- Place of birth: Åtvidaberg, Sweden
- Height: 1.84 m (6 ft 0 in)
- Position: Defender

Senior career*
Years	Team	Apps	(Gls)
1997–2004	Kalmar FF	189	(47)
2005–2015	IF Elfsborg	206	(13)

International career
2007	Sweden	3	(0)
- * Club domestic league appearances and goals as of 1 January 2016

Kent Daniel Mobaeck (born 22 May 1980) is a Swedish footballer who last played for IF Elfsborg in the Allsvenskan. His debut in the Sweden national team came while on a tour in South America in January 2007.

He usually plays as a right back or right midfielder. However, he can play all across the midfield, and even striker.
