= Anders Svensson =

Swedish footballer (born 1976)

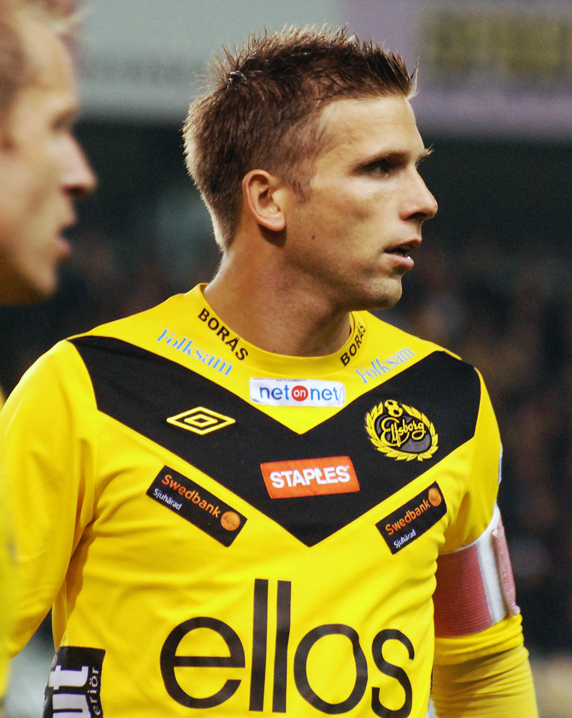
- Svensson playing for Elfsborg in 2012

Personal information
- Full name: Anders Gunnar Svensson
- Date of birth: 17 July 1976 (age 50)
- Place of birth: Gothenburg, Sweden
- Height: 1.77 m (5 ft 10 in)
- Position: Midfielder

Youth career
- 1980–1990: Guldhedens IK
- 1990–1992: Hestrafors IF
- 1993: IF Elfsborg

Senior career*
Years	Team	Apps	(Gls)
1994–2001	IF Elfsborg	155	(38)
2001–2005	Southampton	127	(9)
2005–2015	IF Elfsborg	266	(34)
Total		548	(81)

International career
1996–1998	Sweden U21	16	(2)
1999–2013	Sweden	148	(21)
- * Club domestic league appearances and goals

Anders Gunnar Svensson (Swedish pronunciation: [ˈânːdɛʂ ˈsvɛ̌nːsɔn]; born 17 July 1976) is a Swedish former professional footballer. He was a central midfielder, known for his passing, free kicks, and set piece-taking abilities, who usually operated in a playmaking role. He was capped 148 times for the Sweden national team, many times as a captain, before he retired from international football in 2013. He is the most capped male player for Sweden, beating Thomas Ravelli's previous record of 143 caps.

As well as being named captain of Sweden on several occasions, Svensson also captained Southampton and Elfsborg. He played important roles in the 2002 and 2006 World Cups, in which he proved his leadership skills, resulting in him being named captain of that Sweden national team in 2009.

He is the eighth-most capped European player in history, after Lothar Matthäus, Martin Reim, Cristiano Ronaldo, Iker Casillas, Vitālijs Astafjevs, Sergio Ramos, and Gianluigi Buffon. Svensson also represented the Sweden national team at three consecutive European Championships, in 2004, 2008, and 2012.

== Early years ==
Svensson was born on 17 July 1976 in Gothenburg to parents Bertil and Gun Svensson. Svensson has three brothers, the oldest one, Thomas, Kristoffer, and the youngest one, Marcus. His father Bertil was his coach at Guldhedens IK. He grew up watching English football on television, and when he finally played the game, he was compared with one of the best talents of English football David Beckham. In 1980, Svensson joined Guldhedens IK, where he played for ten years.

== Club career ==
=== IF Elfsborg ===
Svensson played at Guldhedens IK for ten years, until he moved to Borås, where he began to play for IF Elfsborg.

As his role on the pitch was that of an offensive midfielder, although at Southampton he also played on the left side of midfield. He made his breakthrough while playing for IF Elfsborg in the late 1990s before moving to English side Southampton in 2001.

=== Southampton ===
Svensson moved to Southampton on 14 June 2001 for a £750,000 transfer fee. In his first season in the Premier League, Svensson scored four goals in 35 appearances for the Saints, and the club finished in 11th place, missing the UEFA Cup participation by just one point. He was a key player for Southampton; although near the end of his time with the club, he was rarely selected for Gordon Strachan's starting 11.

He played an important role for Southampton in their success in the 2002–03 FA Cup. Their opening match was a 4–0 win against fellow Premier League club Tottenham Hotspur. Svensson scored a goal along with other goal scorers Michael Svensson, Jo Tessem, and James Beattie, taking the club to a second consecutive victory against Tottenham, having beaten them on New Year's Day in the league. He played for Southampton in the 2003 FA Cup Final against Arsenal, which Southampton lost 1–0. Svensson also played in the 2003–04 UEFA Cup for the Saints, but the club was knocked out of the tournament in the first round.

During his time with Southampton, Svensson made 140 appearances. Despite chairman Rupert Lowe allegedly offering him a new contract, Svensson turned down the offer in order to return to his former club IF Elfsborg.

=== Return to IF Elfsborg ===
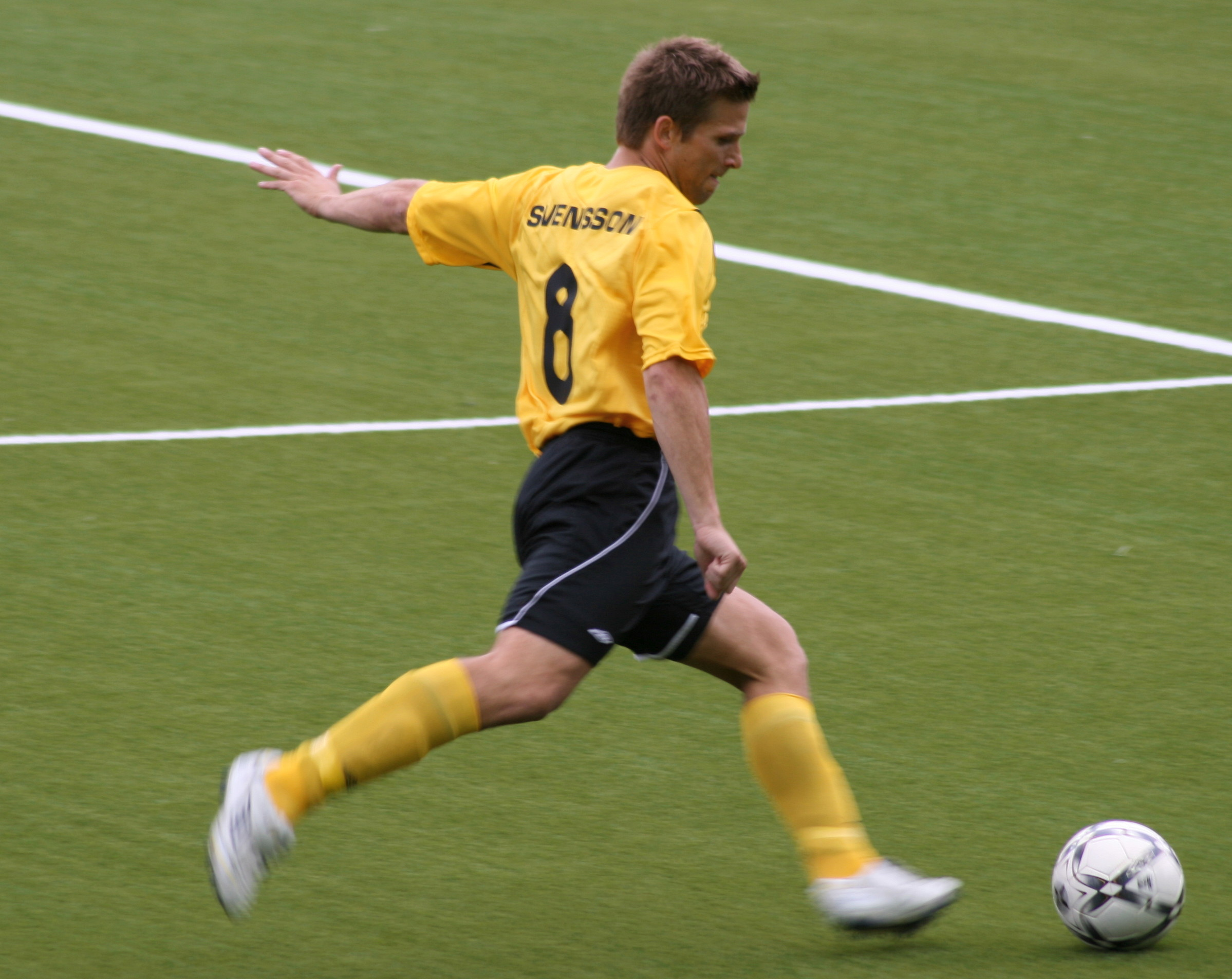
Anders Svensson playing for IF Elfsborg.

He rejoined Elfsborg in 2005 and was the captain of the team until 2014, when he gave up the title to Johan Larsson. He helped the team win the 2006 and 2012 Allsvenskan titles. After another 10 years at IF Elfsborg Svensson decided to announce his retirement from professional football in 2015.

== International career ==
In 1996, he debuted in the Swedish under-21 team. In 1998, he played in the U-21 championships along with Jörgen Pettersson, Yksel Osmanovski, Daniel Andersson, and Freddie Ljungberg.

He debuted for the Sweden national side against South Africa in 1999.

He was known for being a good free kick taker, which he showed in the 2002 World Cup in South Korea/Japan, where he scored a free kick goal against Argentina, which effectively eliminated the opponent in the group stages. He set up the opening goal for Henrik Larsson against Senegal through an in-swinging corner. He nearly scored a golden goal in extra time, but his shot from inside the box was denied by the post. He played for Sweden in the Euro 2004, as well as the 2006 World Cup.

However, he found form for the national team during the Euro 2008 qualifying stage. He played 11 games with two goals and one assist which led Sweden to the Euro 2008. Svensson played every minute of every game during Euro 2008, but did not find form. His frustration showed, conceding a few free kicks during their last game in the tournament. After Henrik Larsson retired, and Zlatan Ibrahimović declared that he was unsure about his future in the national team, Svensson was the team captain for Sweden in a friendly against Italy (0–1). After Ibrahimović returned to the national team in the summer of 2010, Svensson was named co-captain, although Ibrahimović remained official captain on the pitch.

On 6 September 2013, Svensson became the joint most capped male player in Swedish football history, equalling Thomas Ravelli's record with his 143rd cap; he would later claim the record for himself. It was to be a memorable night for Svensson, as he scored the winner as Sweden came from behind to beat Ireland 2–1. In November 2013, the Swedish Football Association (SvFF) sparked a sexism scandal at its annual awards Gala when it presented Svensson with a Volvo car for winning 146 caps. The governing body was widely criticised for failing to honour Therese Sjögran, who had 187 caps. After Sweden failed to win against Portugal in the play-offs for the World Cup 2014 in November 2013, Svensson decided to retire from international duty.

== Post-playing career ==
In 2014, Svensson, still actively playing at that time, started to work as a football commentator for Kanal 5.

== Personal life ==
Svensson was in a two-year relationship with fashion designer Anine Bing while playing for Southampton. The pair met in London where she was modelling at the time. Svensson married Emma Johansson in July 2007 at Thorberg Castle.

== Career statistics ==
=== International ===
Appearances and goals by national team and year
National team	Year	Apps	Goals
Sweden	1999	1	0
Sweden	2000	6	1
Sweden	2001	15	5
Sweden	2002	11	1
Sweden	2003	10	3
Sweden	2004	12	1
Sweden	2005	7	1
Sweden	2006	9	1
Sweden	2007	13	2
Sweden	2008	10	0
Sweden	2009	9	1
Sweden	2010	8	1
Sweden	2011	12	1
Sweden	2012	12	0
Sweden	2013	13	3
Total		148	21

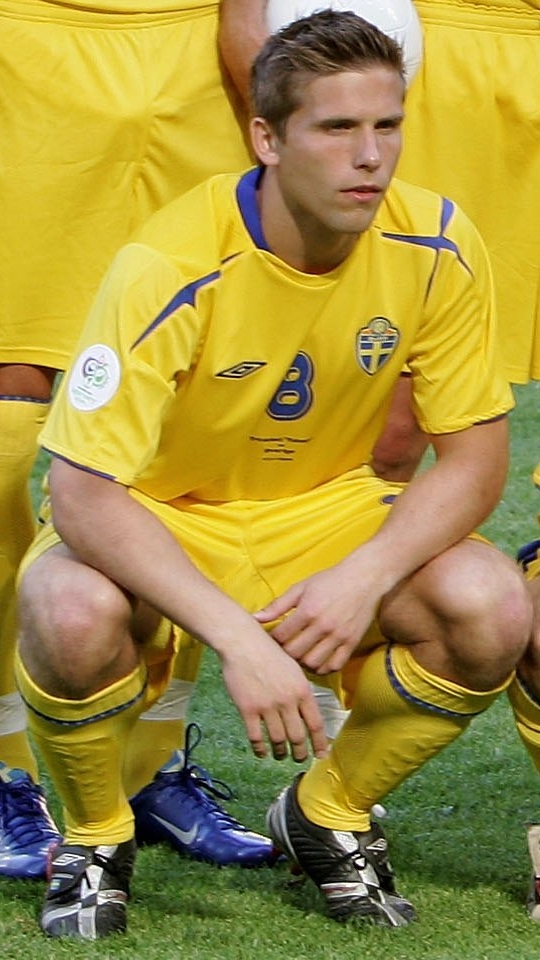
Anders Svensson is the most capped player for the Sweden national team and the sixth most capped outfield-player in European football history.

Scores and results list Sweden's goal tally first, score column indicates score after each Svensson goal.

List of international goals scored by Anders Svensson
No.	Date	Venue	Opponent	Score	Result	Competition
1	2 September 2000	Tofiq Bahramov Republican Stadium, Baku, Azerbaijan	Azerbaijan	1–0	1–0	2002 FIFA World Cup qualification
2	10 February 2001	Suphachalasai Stadium, Bangkok, Thailand	Thailand	2–0	4–1	2001 King's Cup
3	24 March 2001	Ullevi, Gothenburg, Sweden	Macedonia	1–0	1–0	2002 FIFA World Cup qualification
4	25 April 2001	Charmilles Stadium, Geneva, Switzerland	Switzerland	1–0	2–0	Friendly
5	25 April 2001	Charmilles Stadium, Geneva, Switzerland	Switzerland	2–0	2–0	Friendly
6	7 October 2001	Råsunda Stadium, Solna, Sweden	Azerbaijan	1–0	3–0	2002 FIFA World Cup qualification
7	12 June 2002	Miyagi Stadium, Rifu, Japan	Argentina	1–0	1–1	2002 FIFA World Cup
8	11 June 2003	Råsunda Stadium, Solna, Sweden	Poland	1–0	3–0	UEFA Euro 2004 qualifying
9	11 June 2003	Råsunda Stadium, Solna, Sweden	Poland	3–0	3–0	UEFA Euro 2004 qualifying
10	20 August 2003	Idrottsparken, Norrköping, Sweden	Greece	1–0	1–2	Friendly
11	9 October 2004	Råsunda Stadium, Solna, Sweden	Hungary	3–0	3–0	2006 FIFA World Cup qualification
12	4 June 2005	Ullevi, Gothenburg, Sweden	Malta	2–0	6–0	2006 FIFA World Cup qualification
13	18 January 2006	King Fahd Sports City Stadium, Riyadh, Saudi Arabia	Saudi Arabia	1–0	1–1	Friendly
14	6 June 2007	Råsunda Stadium, Solna, Sweden	Iceland	2–0	5–0	UEFA Euro 2008 qualifying
15	13 October 2007	Rheinpark Stadion, Vaduz, Liechtenstein	Liechtenstein	3–0	3–0	UEFA Euro 2008 qualifying
16	14 October 2009	Råsunda Stadium, Solna, Sweden	Albania	4–1	4–1	2010 FIFA World Cup qualification
17	20 January 2010	Al-Seeb Stadium, Muscat, Oman	Oman	1–0	1–0	Friendly
18	19 January 2011	Cape Town Stadium, Cape Town, South Africa	Botswana	2–1	2–1	Friendly
19	26 January 2013	700th Anniversary Stadium, Chiang Mai, Thailand	Finland	3–0	3–0	2013 King's Cup
20	14 August 2013	Friends Arena, Solna, Sweden	Norway	4–2	4–2	Friendly
21	6 September 2013	Aviva Stadium, Dublin, Republic of Ireland	Republic of Ireland	2–1	2–1	2014 FIFA World Cup qualification

== Honours ==
IF Elfsborg

- Allsvenskan: 2006, 2012
- Svenska Cupen: 2000–01, 2013–14
- Svenska Supercupen: 2007
- Atlantic Cup: 2011

Southampton

- FA Cup runner-up: 2002–03

== See also ==
- List of men's footballers with 100 or more international caps
