= Johan Karlsson (footballer, born 1975) =

Swedish footballer

Personal information
- Full name: Johan Karlsson
- Date of birth: 6 April 1975 (age 51)
- Place of birth: Sweden
- Height: 1.76 m (5 ft 9 in)
- Position: Defender

Youth career
- Horn/Hycklinge IF

Senior career*
Years	Team	Apps	(Gls)
1992–1997	Gullringens GoIF	103	(7)
1998–2000	Åtvidabergs FF	76	(7)
2001–2011	IF Elfsborg	263	(7)
- * Club domestic league appearances and goals as of 20 January 2011 ‡ National team caps and goals as of 20 January 2011

Johan Karlsson (born 6 April 1975) is a Swedish retired footballer who played as a defender. His last club was IF Elfsborg.
