= 2006 IF Elfsborg season =

IF Elfsborg
2006 season
- Manager: Magnus Haglund
- Allsvenskan: 1st
- Svenska Cupen: Quarter-final
- Top goalscorer: Anders Svensson (7)

In 2006 IF Elfsborg, the Swedish football club located in Borås, won their first national title since 1961, thanks to a dramatic finish to the season, where Elfsborg hit top form at the end of the year, sealing the title thanks to Joakim Sjöhage's goal against Djurgården. When Djurgården's claim for a penalty was waved off in stoppage time, Elfsborg overhauled AIK by a single point.

== Squad ==
=== Goalkeepers ===
- (Sweden) Johan Wiland
- (Sweden) Abbas Hassan
- (Sweden) Nicholas Sharro

=== Defenders ===
- (Sweden) Johan Sjöberg
- (Sweden) Martin Andersson
- (Sweden) Daniel Mobaeck
- (Sweden) Jon Jönsson
- (Sweden) Jesper Arvidsson
- (Sweden) Markus Falk Olander
- (Sweden) Andreas Augustsson
- (Sweden) Martin Strömberg

=== Midfielders ===
- (Sweden) Johan Karlsson
- (Finland) Jari Ilola
- (Sweden) Anders Svensson
- (Sweden) Samuel Holmén
- (Sweden) Magnus Samuelsson
- (Sweden) Sebastian Göransson
- (Sweden) Emir Bajrami
- (France) Léandre Griffit
- (Sweden) Stefan Ishizaki
- (Sweden) Elmin Kurbeqović
- (Sweden) Daniel Eres

=== Attackers ===
- (Sweden) Mathias Svensson
- (Sweden) Joakim Sjöhage
- (Sweden) Daniel Alexandersson
- (Sweden) Denni Avdić

== Allsvenskan ==
=== Matches ===
- Elfsborg-IFK Göteborg 1-1
- 1-0 Samuel Holmén 39'
- 1-1 Karl Svensson 90'
- Öster-Elfsborg 3-4
- 0-1 Stefan Ishizaki 6'
- 1-1 Helgi Daníelsson 36'
- 1-2 Mathias Svensson 52'
- 2-2 Marco da Silva 68'
- 2-3 Samuel Holmén 75'
- 3-3 Tomas Backman 79'
- 3-4 Anders Svensson 84'
- Halmstad-Elfsborg 0-1
- 0-1 Andreas Augustsson 30'
- Elfsborg-Kalmar FF 1-0
- 1-0 Stefan Ishizaki 39'
- Elfsborg-Häcken 2-2
- 0-1 Hans Berggren 38'
- 1-1 Anders Svensson 53'
- 1-2 Hans Berggren 59'
- 2-2 Mathias Svensson 78'
- Örgryte-Elfsborg 0-2
- 0-1 Joakim Sjöhage 32'
- 0-2 Joakim Sjöhage 55'
- AIK-Elfsborg 2-2
- 1-0 Markus Jonsson 75'
- 2-0 Dulee Johnson 84'
- 2-1 Anders Svensson 90'
- 2-2 Daniel Alexandersson 90'
- Elfsborg-Gefle 0-1
- 0-1 Yannick Bapupa 53'
- Elfsborg-Helsingborg 0-0
- Djurgården-Elfsborg 1-1
- 1-0 Abgar Barsom 38'
- 1-1 Andreas Augustsson 90'
- GAIS-Elfsborg 0-3
- 0-1 Samuel Holmén 24'
- 0-2 Jon Jönsson 41'
- 0-3 Joakim Sjöhage 77'
- Elfsborg-Malmö FF 4-2
- 0-1 Júnior 13'
- 1-1 Anders Svensson 16'
- 1-2 Júnior 39'
- 2-2 Anders Svensson 54'
- 3-2 Daniel Alexandersson 64'
- 4-2 Samuel Holmén 90'
- Malmö FF-Elfsborg 1-1
- 1-0 Daniel Andersson 6'
- 1-1 Anders Svensson 55'
- Elfsborg-Halmstad 3-0
- 1-0 Jon Jönsson 14'
- 2-0 Daniel Alexandersson 26'
- 3-0 Mathias Svensson 38'
- IFK Göteborg-Elfsborg 1-1
- 0-1 Stefan Ishizaki 38'
- 1-1 Gustaf Svensson 83'
- Elfsborg-AIK 1-1
- 1-0 Andreas Augustsson 50'
- 1-1 Daniel Mendes 66'
- Gefle-Elfsborg 1-1
- 0-1 Anders Svensson 50'
- 1-1 Johan Claesson 74'
- Häcken-Elfsborg 1-4
- 0-1 Mathias Svensson 19'
- 1-1 Dioh Williams 31'
- 1-2 Mathias Svensson 43'
- 1-3 Jon Jönsson 49'
- 1-4 own goal 90' (o.g.)
- Elfsborg-Örgryte 2-0
- 1-0 Stefan Ishizaki 54'
- 2-0 Daniel Alexandersson 87'
- Elfsborg-Öster 0-0
- Kalmar FF-Elfsborg 0-1
- 0-1 Jon Jönsson 8'
- Elfsborg-GAIS 1-0
- 1-0 Samuel Holmén 46'
- Helsingborg-Elfsborg 1-1
- 0-1 Mathias Svensson 62'
- 1-1 Olivier Karekezi 64'
- Elfsborg-Djurgården 1-0
- 1-0 Joakim Sjöhage 39'

=== Topscorers ===
- (Sweden) Anders Svensson 7
- (Sweden) Samuel Holmén 5
- (Sweden) Stefan Ishizaki 4
- (Sweden) Mathias Svensson 4
- (Sweden) Jon Jönsson 4
- (Sweden) Daniel Alexandersson 4

== Sources ==
IF Elfsborg -- FootballSquads
