= Borås Arena =

Football stadium in Borås, Sweden

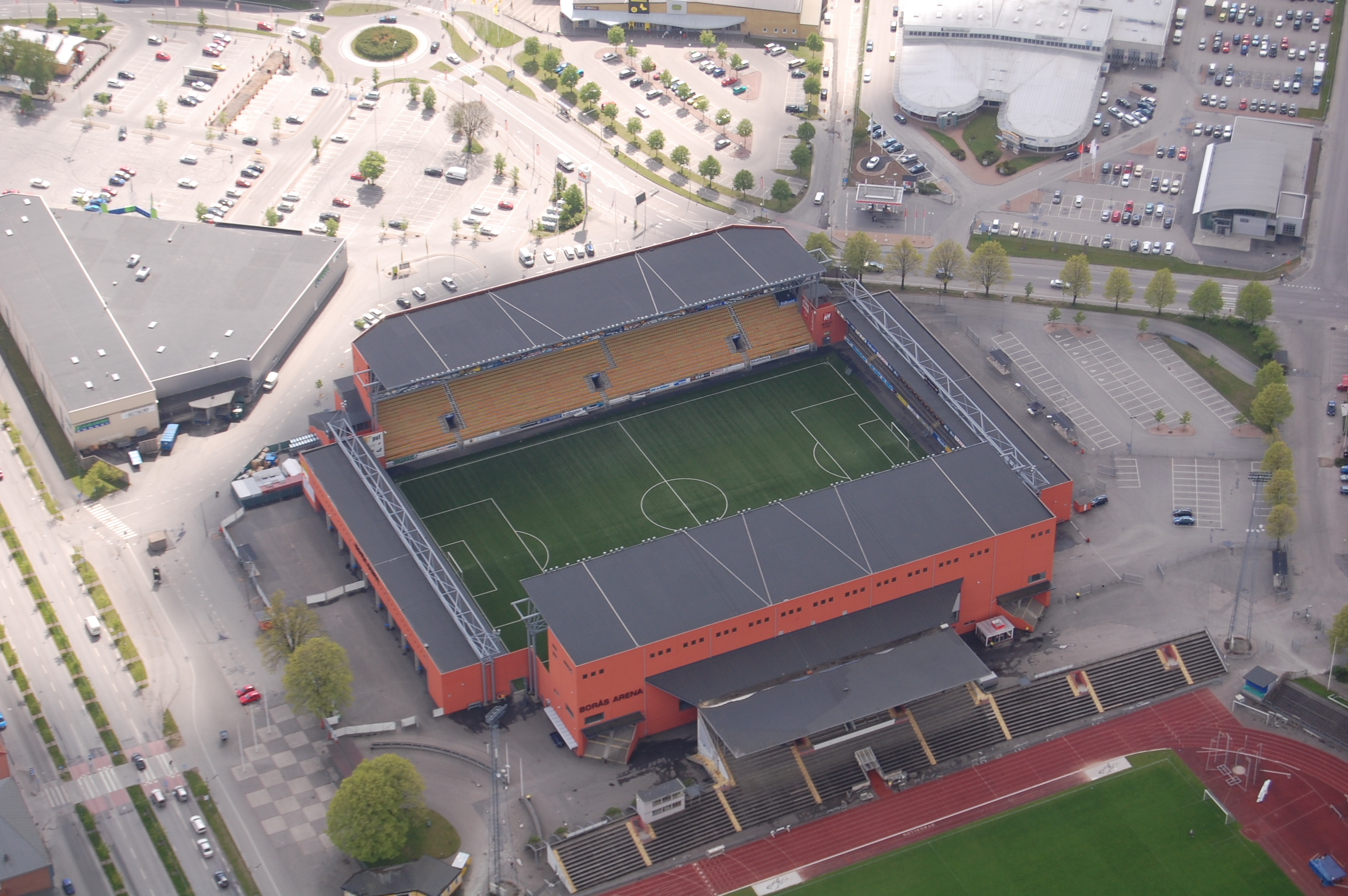
- Aerial View
- Interactive map of Borås Arena
- Full name: Borås Arena
- Location: Ålgårdsvägen 32, 506 30 Borås, Sweden
- Coordinates: 57°44′4″N 12°56′5″E
- Owner: IF Elfsborg 100%
- Operator: Borås Arena AB
- Capacity: 14,500
- Surface: Artificial turf
- Field size: 105 x 68 m

Construction
- Groundbreaking: 13 December 2003; 22 years ago
- Opened: 17 April 2005; 21 years ago
- Cost: 112 million kronor
- Architect: Crister Larsson (Creacon)
- Main contractor: IBAB

Tenants
- IF Elfsborg; Norrby IF

The Borås Arena is a football stadium in Borås, Sweden. It is the home ground of IF Elfsborg and Norrby IF and was opened in 2005. Borås Arena has an artificial turf pitch, GreenFields MX by GreenFields, and has a capacity of 14,500. Both clubs presently using the stadium previously had Ryavallen as their home ground. Until recently it was the only stadium in Allsvenskan built in the last 40 years. The arena is located in Knalleland and is very close to the newly built athletics hall Ryahallen.

The first game at Borås Arena was IF Elfsborg vs Örgryte IS on 17 April 2005 in the top Swedish league, Allsvenskan. The game ended in a 1–0 victory for Elfsborg, Daniel Mobaeck scoring the goal. The current record attendance is 17,070 and was set 4 July 2005 in a game between IF Elfsborg and Kalmar FF which marked the return of both Anders Svensson and Mathias Svensson.

The stadium was originally scheduled to be a tournament site for the 2009 UEFA European Under-21 Football Championship, but a sponsorship conflict with Max fast food chain's location at the stadium and official UEFA sponsor McDonald's, plus a contractual requirement for official sponsors to have a monopoly over the stadium's area, and a refusal to close the restaurant led to it losing its status as a site for the tournament.

Borås Arena didn't only open a new era for IF Elfsborg but also for other clubs in Allsvenskan, Elfsborg was the first club to build a new arena owned by their investment company. Many other clubs have built new arenas copying the model Elfsborg set up, trying to own their arena which gives big economic resources.

== History ==
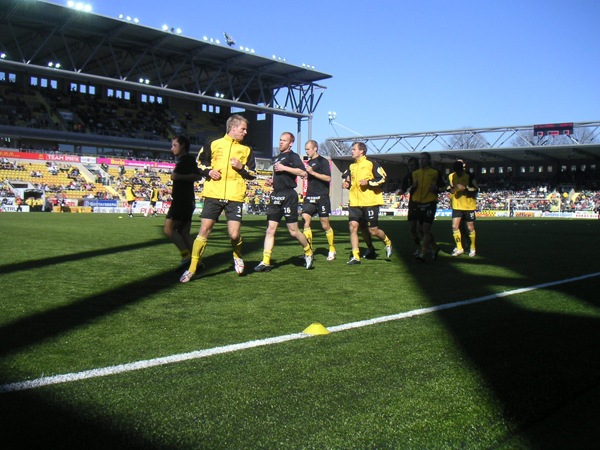
Players warming up in the Borås Arena opening game against Örgryte IS.

Borås Arena is a football stadium in Borås, Sweden, and it is the home ground of IF Elfsborg and Norrby IF. Borås Arena has an artificial turf pitch, and was changed to the most modern synthetic turf on the market during the UEFA Euro 2012 at a cost of £500,000. The capacity of the arena is 11,700–14,500 depending on usage, 11,700 is the capacity during international matches because it is seating only. Borås Arena is located next to Elfsborg's old home ground Ryavallen, both of the stadiums are built together at the roofs, which means that the new stadium is still attached to the old historical Ryavallen.

The first construction started on 31 December 2003 and was inaugurated April 17, 2005 at a cost of £8,500,000 which was very cheap at this time considering to be Sweden's most modern stadium at that time. It was an effort by Borås Municipality that went out as a lender to Elfsborg. A necessary investment for the club and the city, Elfsborg would own their own stadium by the company Borås Arena AB and would receive all revenues without any intermediaries from matches. Borås Arena didn't only open a new era for IF Elfsborg but also for other clubs in Allsvenskan, Elfsborg was the first club to build a new arena owned by their own investment company. Many other clubs have built new arenas copying the model Elfsborg set up, trying to own their arena which gives big economic resources. Borås Arena consists of four main grandstands; Knallelandsläktaren, Ålgårdsläktaren, Sjuhäradsläktaren and Elfsborgsläktaren.

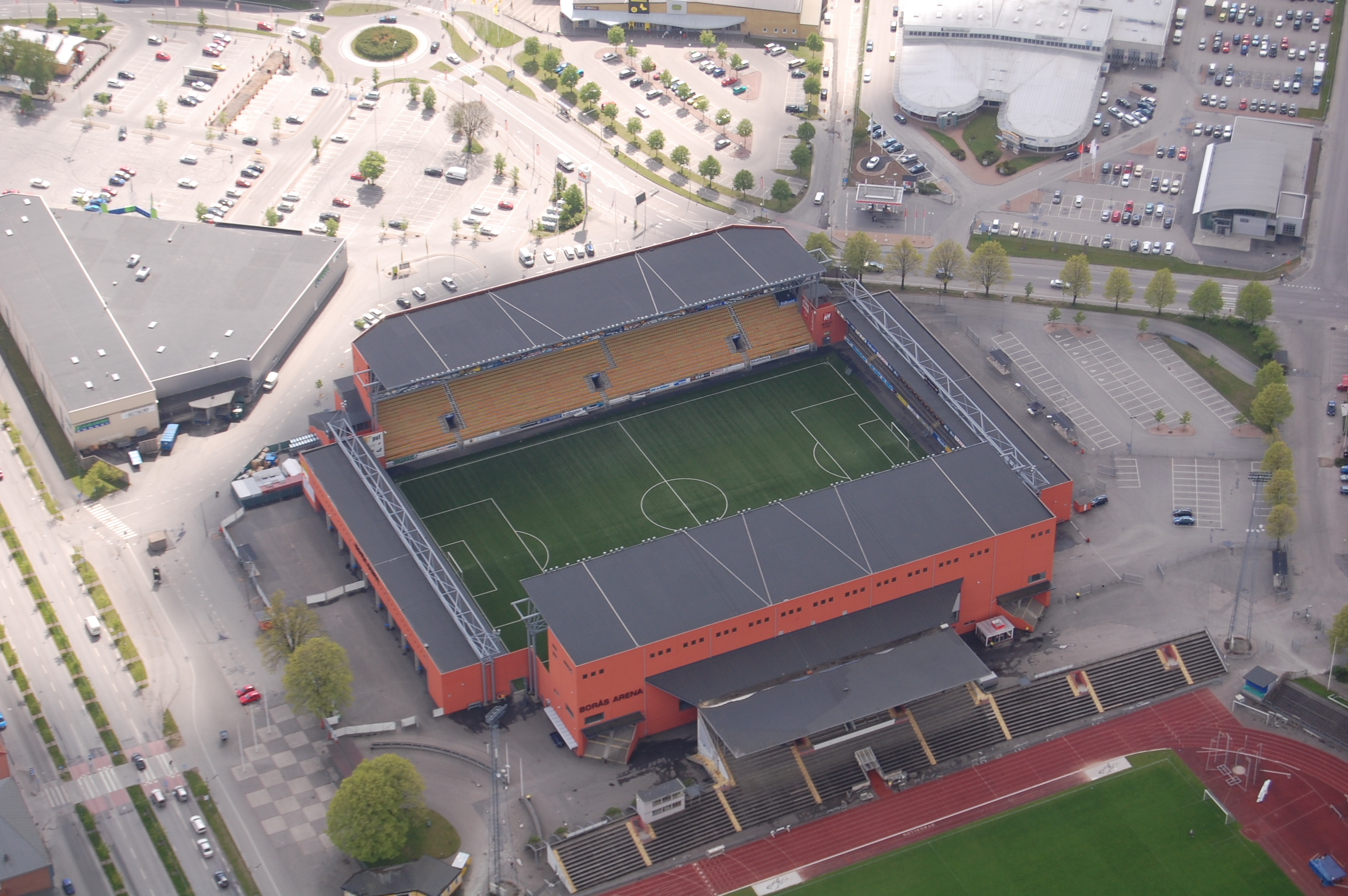
Borås Arena seen from above where it is connected with old Ryavallen.

The first game at Borås Arena was between IF Elfsborg vs Örgryte IS on 17 April 2005 in the top Swedish league, Allsvenskan. The game ended in a 1–0 victory for Elfsborg, Daniel Mobaeck scoring the only and first goal in history on Borås Arena. The current record attendance is 17,070 and was set 4 July 2005 in a game between IF Elfsborg and Kalmar FF which marked the return of both Anders Svensson and Mathias Svensson. Anders Svensson also became the first on Borås Arena to score a hat-trick in the derby against rivals IFK Göteborg, Elfsborg won with Anders 3 goals, 3–1. The highest attendance on an international tournament was during the Champions League play-off against Valencia CF where 13,148 spectators came to see Elfsborg deal with the Spaniards. Elfsborg lost with 2–1, after a goal by Daniel Alexandersson.

The stadium was originally scheduled to be a tournament site for the 2009 UEFA European Under-21 Football Championship, but a sponsorship conflict with Max fast food chain's location at the stadium and official UEFA sponsor McDonald's, plus a contractual requirement for official sponsors to have a monopoly over the stadium's area, and a refusal to close the restaurant led to it losing its status as a site for the tournament. A strange conflict that led to Elfsborg and Borås Arena lost the championship as an arranger.

2006 was a special year for Borås Arenas, when Elfsborg received the 5th SM-Gold. An explicit goal from the club was to win SM-Gold by 2007 and this was accomplished a year in advance, 5 November 2006. The association was strengthened by this for a couple of years, organizationally and financially, with new sports director "Mr. Elfsborg" Stefan Andreasson, President-elect Bosse Johansson and two billionaires as external funders. The new manager couple Magnus Haglund and Peter Wettergren, who was employed before the 2004 season, was also in the club. The following year (2005) was also Elfsborg Fortress, Borås Arena, completed while enlisted old players in the form of Anders and Mathias Svensson came back. Memorable matches this season on Borås Arena was, at home, the victory against Malmö FF (4-2), where Anders Svensson made the team's single best effort during the season. Another memorable match was the last one, a Gold match against Djurgårdens IF where Joakim Sjöhage became gold shooter.

== Average attendances ==
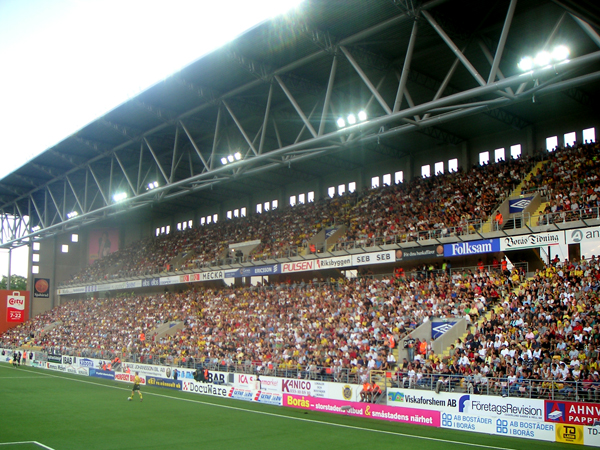
Ålgårdsläktaren, in a derby against IFK Göteborg.

Season	IF Elfsborg	Norrby IF
2005	10,746	559
2006	12,176	337
2007	11,867	286
2008	9,513	295
2009	9,719	312
2010	8,423	512
2011	10,029	634
2012	10,513	470
2013	9,077	438
2014	8,031	398

== Pictures ==
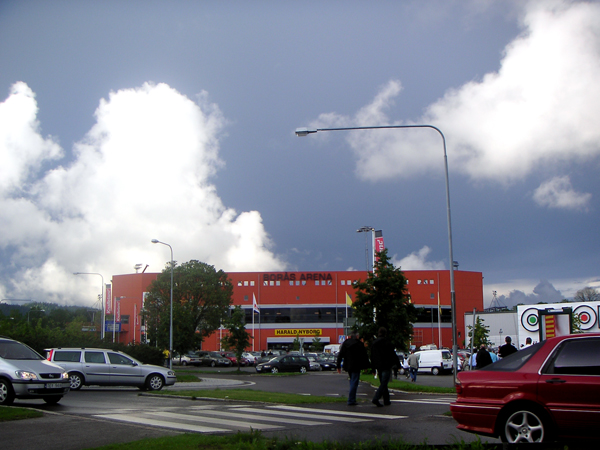
Borås Arena

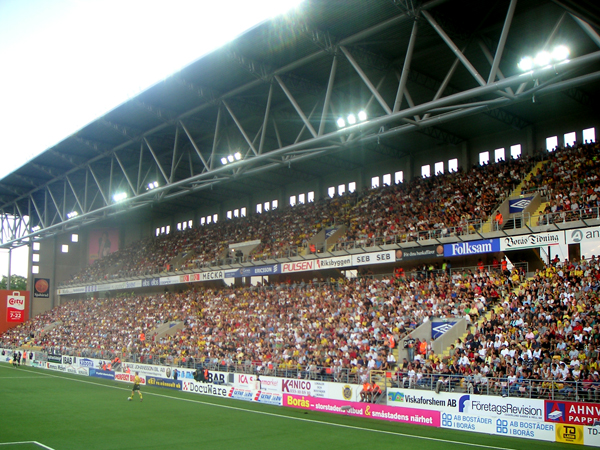
Ålgårdsläktaren, Long side

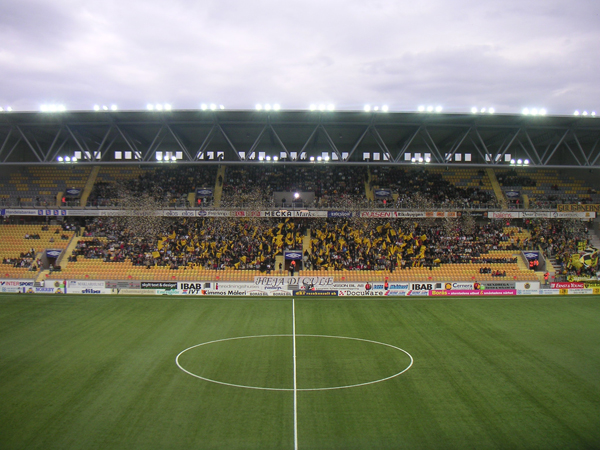
Ålgårdsläktaren, Long side

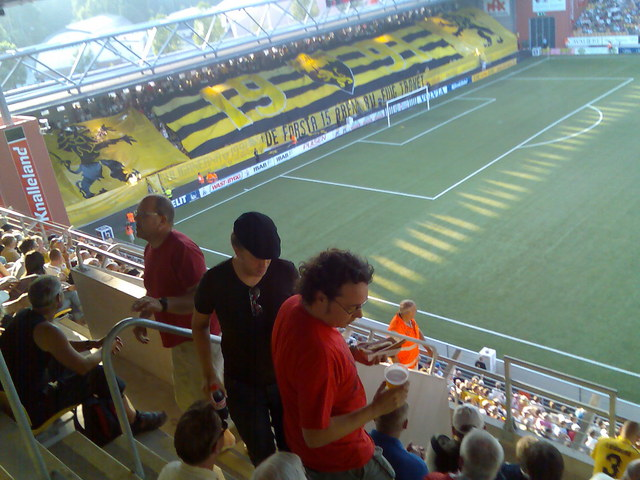
Elfsborgsläktaren seen from Ålgårdsläktaren

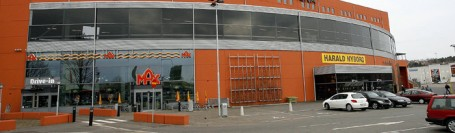
Max restaurant on Borås Arena

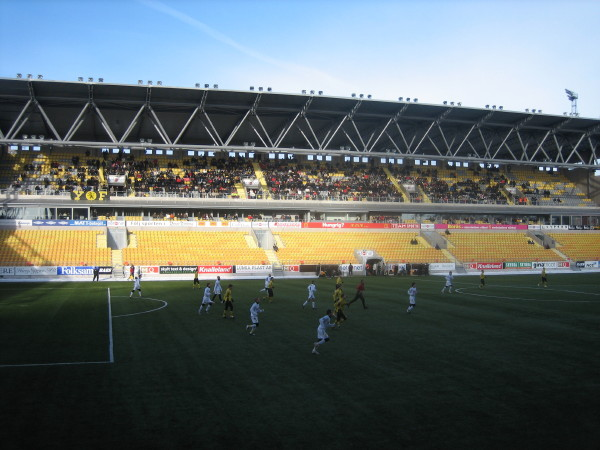
Sjuhäradsläktaren, Long side

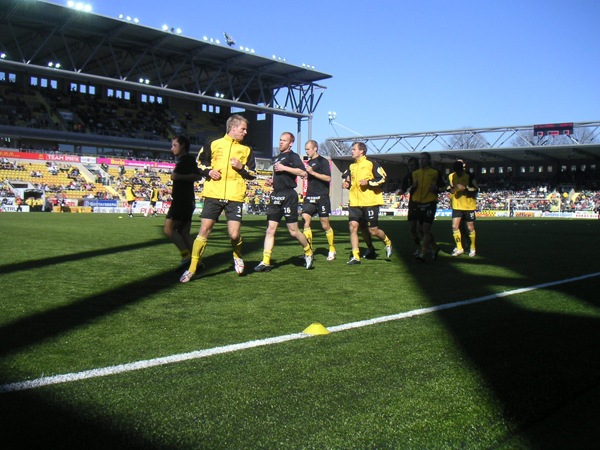
Sjuhäradsläktaren, Longside and Knallelandsläktaren, Short side

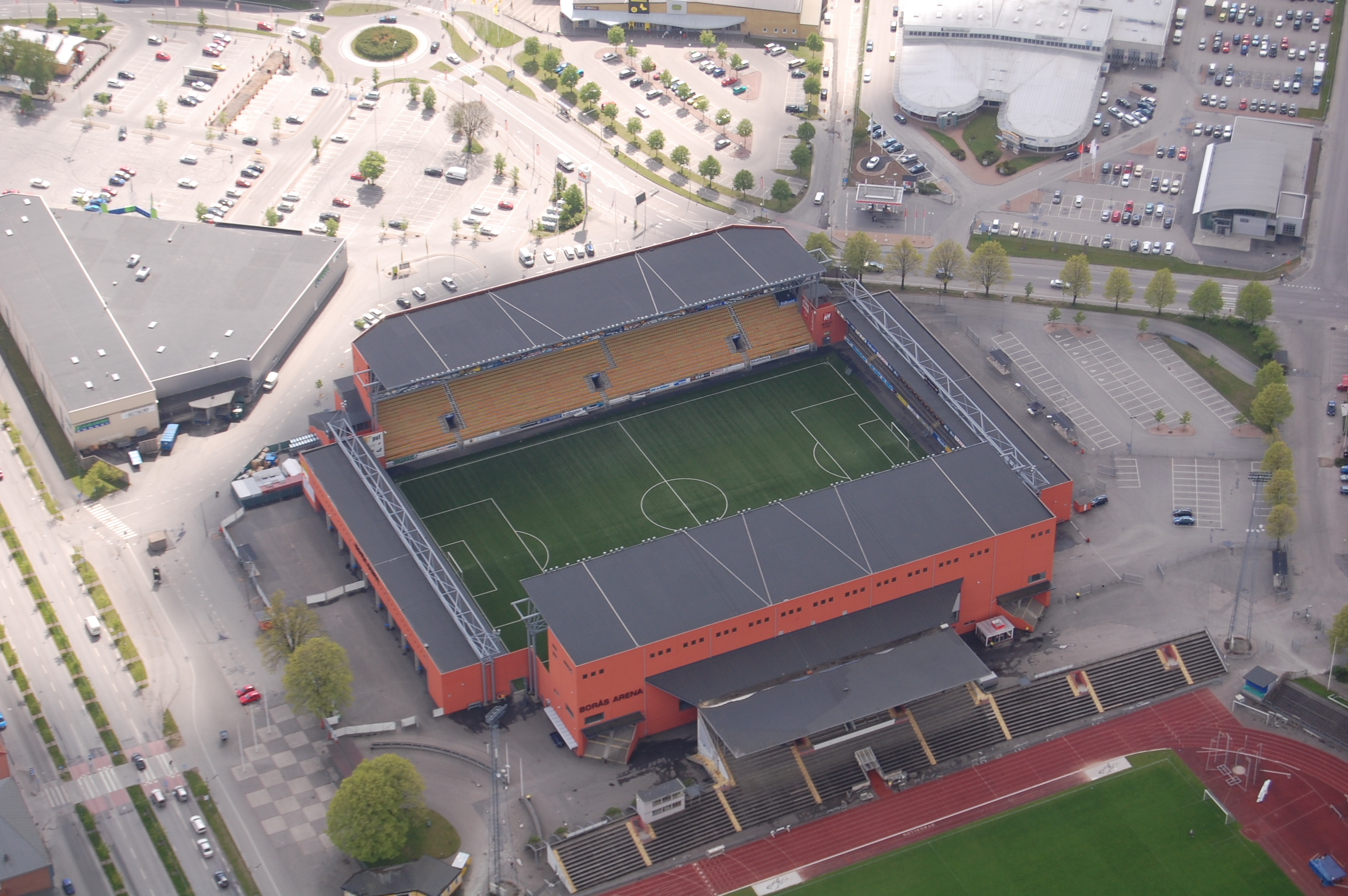
Borås Arena seen from above
