= 2007 Svenska Supercupen =

- Event: Svenska Supercupen
| IF Elfsborg | Helsingborgs IF |
| 1 | 0 |
- Date: 31 March 2007
- Venue: Borås Arena, Borås
- Referee: Martin Ingvarsson (Hässleholm)
- Attendance: 1,240

Svenska Supercupen 2007 (Swedish Super Cup 2007) was the inaugural edition Svenska Supercupen annual football match that 2006 Allsvenskan champions IF Elfsborg successfully pursued the first competition title by defeating 2006 Svenska Cupen winners Helsingborgs IF, 1-0. James Keene scored the only goal of the match in the 55th minute. 1,240 attended the 31 March 2007 match at Borås Arena, Borås.

== Match facts ==
31 March 2007
16:00 CEST

| IF Elfsborg | 1–0 | Helsingborgs IF |
|---|---|---|
| Keene 55' |

Borås Arena, Borås
Attendance: 1,240
Referee: Martin Ingvarsson (Hässleholm)

| IF Elfsborg | Helsingborgs IF |

| GK | 30 | (Sweden) Johan Wiland |
| RB | 11 | (Sweden) Daniel Mobaeck |
| CB | 13 | (Sweden) Jon Jönsson | (substituted off) 65' |
| CB | 22 | (Sweden) Andreas Augustsson |
| LB | 4 | (Sweden) Johan Karlsson |
| RM | 24 | (Sweden) Stefan Ishizaki |
| DM | 7 | (Finland) Jari Ilola |
| DM | 10 | (Sweden) Samuel Holmén |
| LM | 6 | (Sweden) Daniel Alexandersson | (substituted off) 68' |
| CM | 8 | (Sweden) Anders Svensson (c) |
| FW | 17 | (England) James Keene |
Substitutes:
| GK | 1 | (Sweden) Abbas Hassan |
| DF | 5 | (Sweden) Martin Andersson | (substituted on) 65' |
| MF | 20 | (Sweden) Emir Bajrami | (substituted on) 68' |
| FW | 12 | (Sweden) Joakim Sjöhage |
Manager:
(Sweden) Magnus Haglund

| GK | 1 | (Sweden) Daniel Andersson |
| RB | 23 | (Sweden) Erik Wahlstedt |
| CB | 18 | (Algeria) Samir Beloufa |
| CB | 24 | (Sweden) Fredrik Björck |
| LB | 16 | (Argentina) Franco Miranda |
| RM | 15 | (Rwanda) Olivier Karekezi |
| CM | 5 | (Sweden) Andreas Jakobsson (c) |
| CM | 10 | (Kenya) McDonald Mariga |
| LM | 8 | (Finland) Fredrik Svanbäck | (substituted off) 81' |
| FW | 17 | (Sweden) Henrik Larsson |
| FW | 11 | (Benin) Razak Omotoyossi |
Substitutes:
| GK | 22 | (Sweden) Oscar Berglund |
| DF | 33 | (Sweden) Marcus Nilsson |
| MF | 9 | (Sweden) Andreas Dahl |
| MF | 13 | (Iceland) Ólafur Ingi Skúlason |
| FW | 20 | (Sweden) Fredrik Olsson | (substituted on) 81' |
Manager:
(England) Stuart Baxter
