= 1976 Allsvenskan =

52nd season of Allsvenskan

Allsvenskan
- Season: 1976
- Champions: Halmstads BK
- Relegated: Åtvidabergs FF; Örgryte IS
- European Cup: Halmstads BK
- UEFA Cup: Malmö FF; Landskrona BoIS
- Top goalscorer: Rutger Backe, Halmstads BK (21)
- Average attendance: 6,946

Statistics of Allsvenskan in season 1976.

== Overview ==
The league was contested by 14 teams, with Halmstads BK winning the championship.

== League table ==
Pos	Team	Pld	W	D	L	GF	GA	GD	Pts	Qualification or relegation
1	Halmstads BK (C)	26	17	4	5	56	27	+29	38	Qualification to European Cup first round
2	Malmö FF	26	12	11	3	37	21	+16	35	Qualification to UEFA Cup first round
3	Östers IF	26	12	8	6	51	39	+12	32	Qualification to Cup Winners' Cup first round (Note: Öster qualified for the European Cup Winners' Cup as Svenska Cupen champions 1976–77.)
4	Landskrona BoIS	26	12	8	6	34	34	0	32	Qualification to UEFA Cup first round
5	Örebro SK	26	9	11	6	42	34	+8	29	
6	Kalmar FF	26	10	7	9	38	43	−5	27	
7	AIK	26	6	13	7	38	35	+3	25	
8	Hammarby IF	26	10	4	12	40	33	+7	24	
9	IFK Norrköping	26	10	4	12	47	48	−1	24	
10	IF Elfsborg	26	8	8	10	42	48	−6	24	
11	Djurgårdens IF	26	9	6	11	32	38	−6	24	
12	IFK Sundsvall	26	9	4	13	43	57	−14	22	
13	Åtvidabergs FF (R)	26	6	6	14	34	46	−12	18	Relegation to Division 2
14	Örgryte IS (R)	26	3	4	19	24	55	−31	10	Relegation to Division 2

Rules for classification: 1) points; 2) goal difference; 3) number of goals scored.
(C) Champions; (R) Relegated

== Results ==
Home \ Away	AIK	DIF	HBK	HIF	IFE	IFKN	IFKS	KFF	BOIS	MFF	ÅFF	ÖSK	ÖIS	ÖIF
AIK		5–0	3–1	2–0	1–0	3–3	1–3	1–1	0–1	0–0	2–3	1–1	5–2	2–2
Djurgårdens IF	1–1		0–2	0–3	2–0	2–1	2–1	0–1	0–1	0–1	2–0	2–1	1–0	4–3
Halmstads BK	2–1	2–2		3–0	3–0	2–1	3–1	2–0	7–1	1–1	4–1	2–1	2–1	2–0
Hammarby IF	1–1	0–2	1–2		0–0	2–0	6–1	0–0	0–2	3–0	4–1	3–0	3–1	6–0
IF Elfsborg	2–0	2–2	0–3	3–0		1–1	6–2	2–2	3–0	2–1	5–1	0–0	0–1	0–2
IFK Norrköping	3–1	3–2	1–3	2–1	3–5		5–1	2–1	4–0	1–1	1–0	1–2	3–0	0–2
IFK Sundsvall	1–2	2–2	2–2	3–1	2–2	0–2		9–2	1–1	1–3	1–3	1–4	1–0	4–3
Kalmar FF	3–3	2–0	1–5	4–0	0–1	2–1	0–1		1–2	3–1	3–1	1–1	2–0	1–1
Landskrona BoIS	1–1	1–0	1–0	0–0	5–2	3–2	1–0	1–2		1–1	1–1	3–2	3–2	0–1
Malmö FF	1–1	2–0	1–0	1–0	6–0	3–1	3–0	1–0	2–1		2–1	0–0	0–0	1–1
Åtvidabergs FF	0–0	1–1	1–2	0–1	3–0	1–2	0–1	1–2	0–0	1–1		4–2	4–2	2–3
Örebro SK	1–1	1–0	1–1	2–0	4–2	6–2	0–2	2–2	1–1	1–1	0–0		4–1	0–0
Örgryte IS	0–0	0–3	2–0	1–4	2–2	1–1	3–0	1–2	0–2	0–1	1–3	1–2		2–4
Östers IF	2–0	2–2	3–0	2–1	2–2	3–1	0–2	4–0	1–1	2–2	3–1	2–3	3–0	

Legend: Blue = home team win; Yellow = draw; Red = away team win.

== Attendances ==
#	Club	Average attendance	Highest attendance
1	Malmö FF	11,186	23,533
2	Halmstads BK	10,081	16,216
3	Hammarby IF	9,767	25,885
4	AIK	8,204	29,306
5	Kalmar FF	7,476	12,582
6	Djurgårdens IF	6,999	22,121
7	Östers IF	6,807	18,535
8	IF Elfsborg	6,750	8,824
9	IFK Norrköping	6,488	12,354
10	IFK Sundsvall	6,072	10,650
11	Örebro SK	5,466	10,070
12	Landskrona BoIS	5,112	13,758
13	Örgryte IS	4,336	7,725
14	Åtvidabergs FF	2,549	6,597
