= Bondeson =

Bondeson is a surname. Notable people with the surname include:

- August Bondeson (1854–1906), Swedish physician and author
- Jan Bondeson (born 1962), Swedish-British rheumatologist, scientist and author
