= Vessigebro =

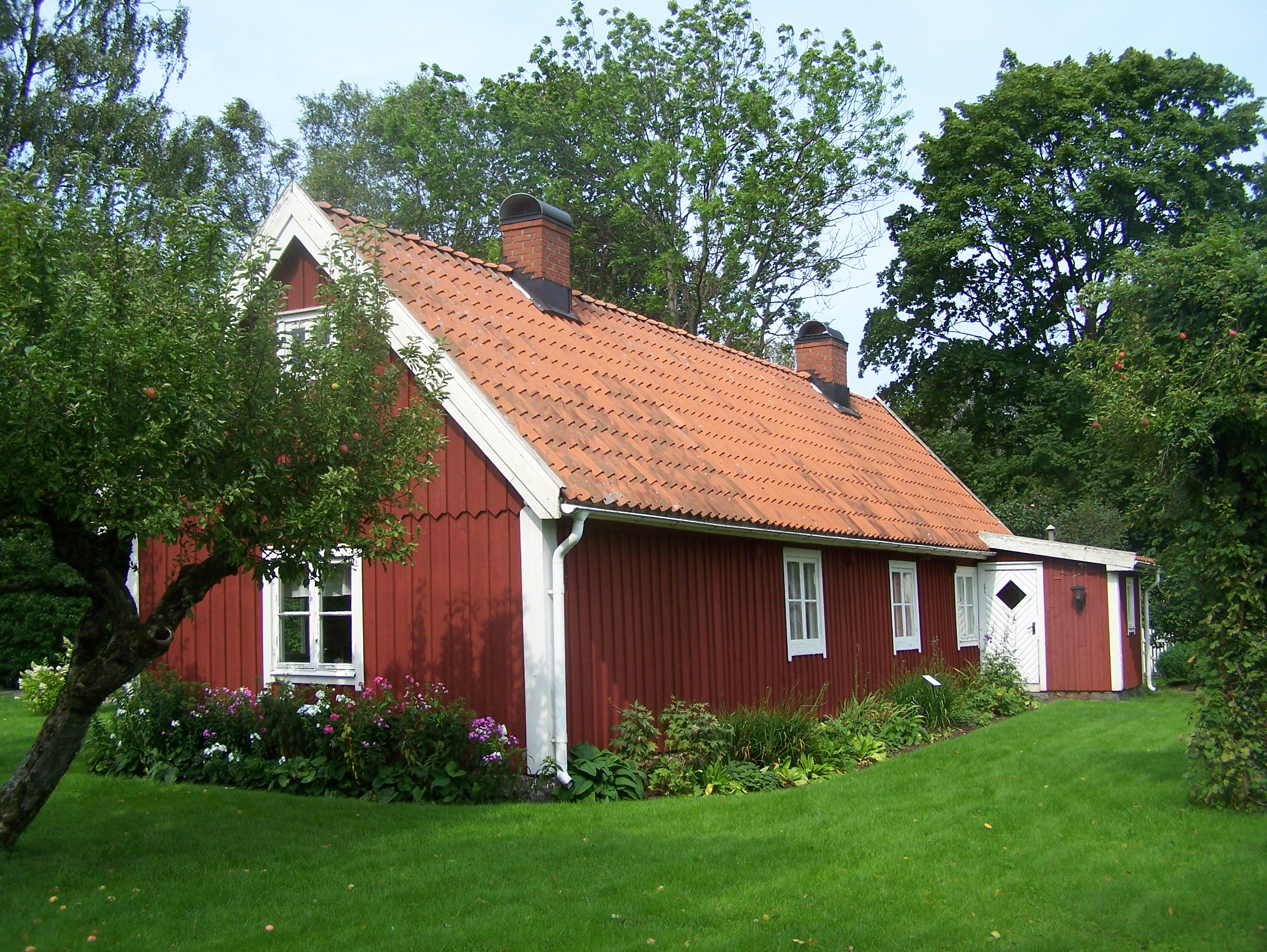
- Fågelboet, birthplace of author August Bondeson

- Location within Halland Location within Sweden
- Coordinates: 56°58′45″N 12°39′58″E
- Country: Sweden
- Province: Halland
- County: Halland County
- Municipality: Falkenberg Municipality

Area
  - Total: 1.03 km^{2} (0.40 sq mi)

Population (31 December 2010)
  - Total: 740
  - Density: 721/km^{2} (1,870/sq mi)
- Time zone: UTC+1 (CET)
  - Summer (DST): UTC+2 (CEST)

Vessigebro is a locality situated in Falkenberg Municipality, Halland County, Sweden, with 740 inhabitants in 2010.

The village was formed at a ford over river Ätran. Its original name, Vessigevad notice this as vad is the Swedish name for a ford. As a bridge was built over the village the name was changed (bro is Swedish for bridge).

The village is home to one of the oldest folk high schools in Sweden, Katrineberg Folk High School. Among facilities found in the village are Vessige church, a school, a football pitch, a nursing home and a store.

Sjönvad, a hamlet east of the village, hosts an annual market, Sjönevad market. An island in the nearby lake Sjönevad hosts the remains of a minor medieval fort. Larsagården, a house of which some parts were built in the 18th century, is located to the west of the village.

Several sport clubs are active in the village, among the most popular sports are football, floorball, gymnastics and golf. Several prominent footballers are from Vessige. Niclas Alexandersson has played over 100 matches for the Sweden men's national football team, while his father, Lennart Alexandersson, and brother, Daniel Alexandersson, both have played in Allsvenskan, the top national league. Author August Bondeson was born in the village.
