= Katrinebergs folkhögskola =

School in Vessigebro, Sweden

Coordinates: 56°58′21″N 12°38′27″E

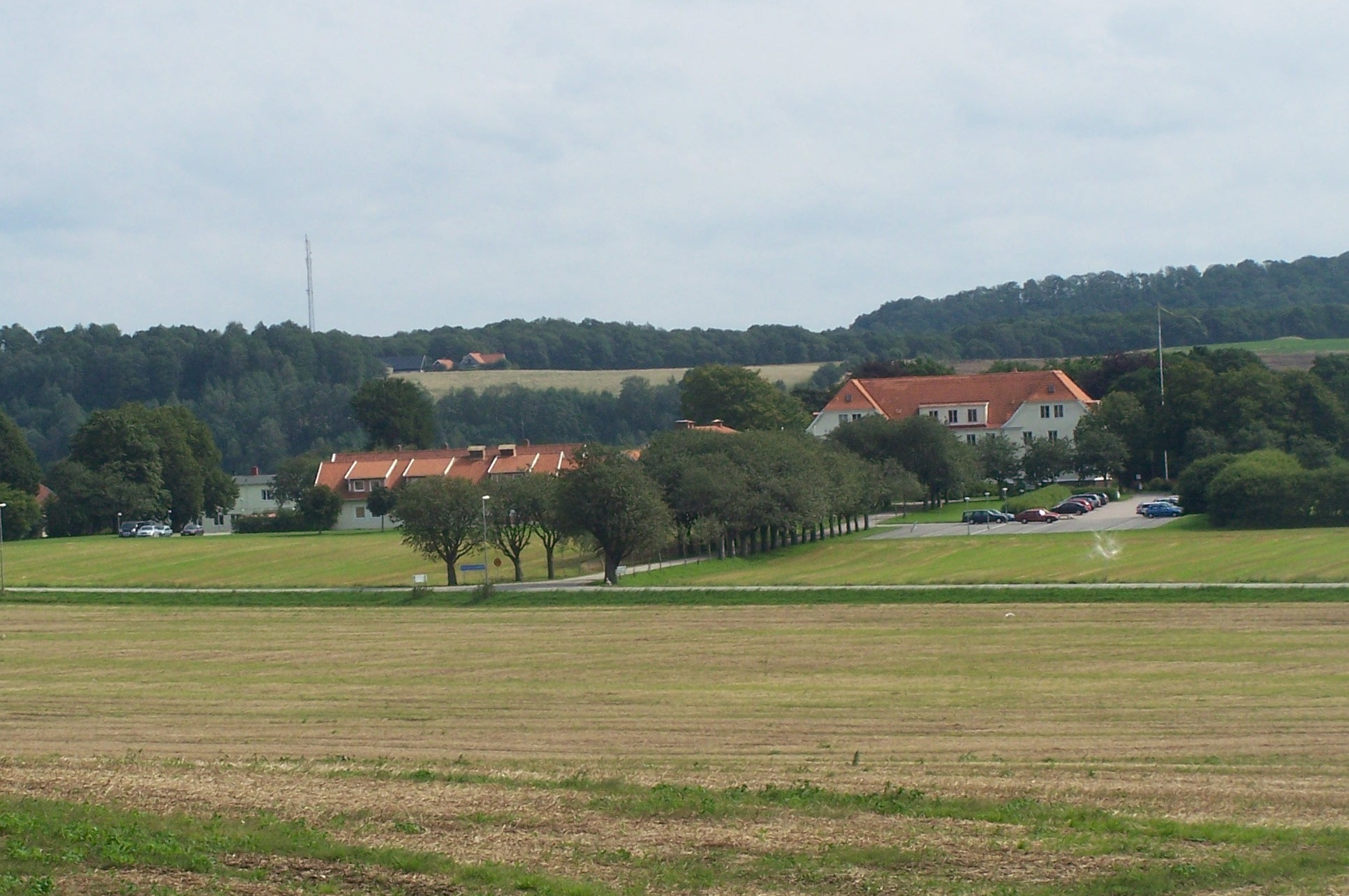

Katrineberg Folk High School (sw. Katrinebergs folkhögskola) is a folk high school in Vessigebro, Sweden. It is run by the county, and was founded in 1873, which makes it one of the older folk high schools in Sweden. The school has a branch in Halmstad. It has about 200 students, of which about 100 have accommodation at the school. It is used as a youth hostel during the summer
