= Torbjörn Arvidsson =

Swedish footballer

Personal information
- Full name: Torbjörn Arvidsson
- Date of birth: 6 May 1968 (age 58)
- Place of birth: Sweden
- Height: 1.87 m (6 ft 2 in)
- Positions: Central defender; central midfielder

Team information
- Current team: Hajduk Split (Assistant)

Youth career
- –1988: Kalmar FF

Senior career*
Years	Team	Apps	(Gls)
1989–2005	Halmstads BK	306	(22)

Managerial career
- 2006–2015: Halmstads BK (assistant)
- 2010–2015: Halmstads BK U-21
- 2016–2017: Varbergs BoIS (assistant)
- 2018: Kalmar FF U-17
- 2019: Kalmar FF (assistant)
- 2020–2021: Halmstads BK (assistant)
- 2021–: Hajduk Split (fitness coach)
- * Club domestic league appearances and goals

Torbjörn Arvidsson (born 6 May 1968) is a Swedish former football player, who played as a defender for Halmstads BK. He is currently the assistant manager of Hajduk Split.

== Career ==
Starting his career in Kalmar FF he early moved to Halmstads BK in 1989, where he played until 2005. During this time he became the player with most games in Allsvenskan for Halmstad so far, 306 games and 543 games in total, he won Allsvenskan twice and Svenska Cupen once and 1998-1999 he was the team captain and also playing several time in European cups.

He made his debut for the club in 1989 in the serie debut against Örebro SK and his last match was in the cup against Ystads IF FF in 2005.

== Coaching career ==
From 2010 until he left Halmstad BK at the end of 2015, beside his role as the assistant manager of the first team, Arvidsson was also responsible for the clubs U-21 squad. Arvidsson continued his coaching career at Varbergs BoIS. He signed as an assistant manager on 4 January 2016. He left the club at the end of 2017 to join Kalmar FF, which already was announced in November 2017. Arvidsson was going to take charge of the U-17 squad.

On 7 January 2019, Arvidsson was promoted to the technical staff of the first team at Kalmar FF, functioning as one of the assistant managers.

== Achievements ==
Halmstads BK:

- Allsvenskan:

- Champion: 1997, 2000
- Stora Silvret (2nd): 2004
- Lilla Silvret (3rd): 1995, 1999
- Bronze: 1998

- Svenska Cupen:

- Champion: 1995
