= Lennart Alexandersson =

Swedish footballer (born 1947)

Personal information
- Date of birth: 31 March 1947
- Positions: Full-back; forward

Senior career*
Years	Team	Apps	(Gls)
- Halmstads BK
- * Club domestic league appearances and goals

Lennart Alexandersson (born 31 March 1947) is a Swedish former footballer who as a full-back or forward played for Halmstads BK in the 1960s and 1970s. He is the father of football players, Niclas and Daniel Alexandersson.

In 1965, Halmstads was demoted to Division 3. From 1966 to 1968, the team regained their Division 2 status after dominating Division 3 with a goal difference of 87 to 23, a record in the Swedish league system. After Halmstads triumphant return to Division 2, Alexandersson along with three other teammates became the first contracted players for the club.

After his retirement from football, Lennart settled in Falkenberg with his wife and three sons. Two of his sons eventually went on to play for Halmstads BK. His son Niclas helped lead the team to the Svenska Cupen in 1995. As of June 2002, he had two grandchildren from his son Niclas.
