= Rutger Backe =

Swedish football player, Falkenberg

Personal information
- Date of birth: 14 January 1951 (age 75)
- Place of birth: Falkenberg, Sweden
- Position: Striker

Senior career*
Years	Team	Apps	(Gls)
–	IF Böljan		
1972–1981	Halmstads BK	207	(77)

International career
1979–1980	Sweden	8	(2)

Managerial career
- 1990–1991: Varbergs BoIS
- 1997: Falkenbergs FF
- 1999: Harplinge IK
- 2003–2006: Varbergs BoIS
- * Club domestic league appearances and goals

Rutger Backe (born 14 January 1951 in Falkenberg) is a Swedish former football player and coach. He started his career in local club IF Böljan. He joined Allsvenskan club Halmstads BK in 1972, with whom he played until 1981. Backe played 207 matches in the top league, scoring 77 goals. He was the Allsvenskan top scorer with 21 goals, when the club won its first ever Swedish national championship in 1976. Backe played 8 matches with the Sweden national team, scoring two goals. He trained Varbergs BoIS and Falkenbergs FF as coach in the 1990s.
