= August Bondeson =

Swedish physician and author

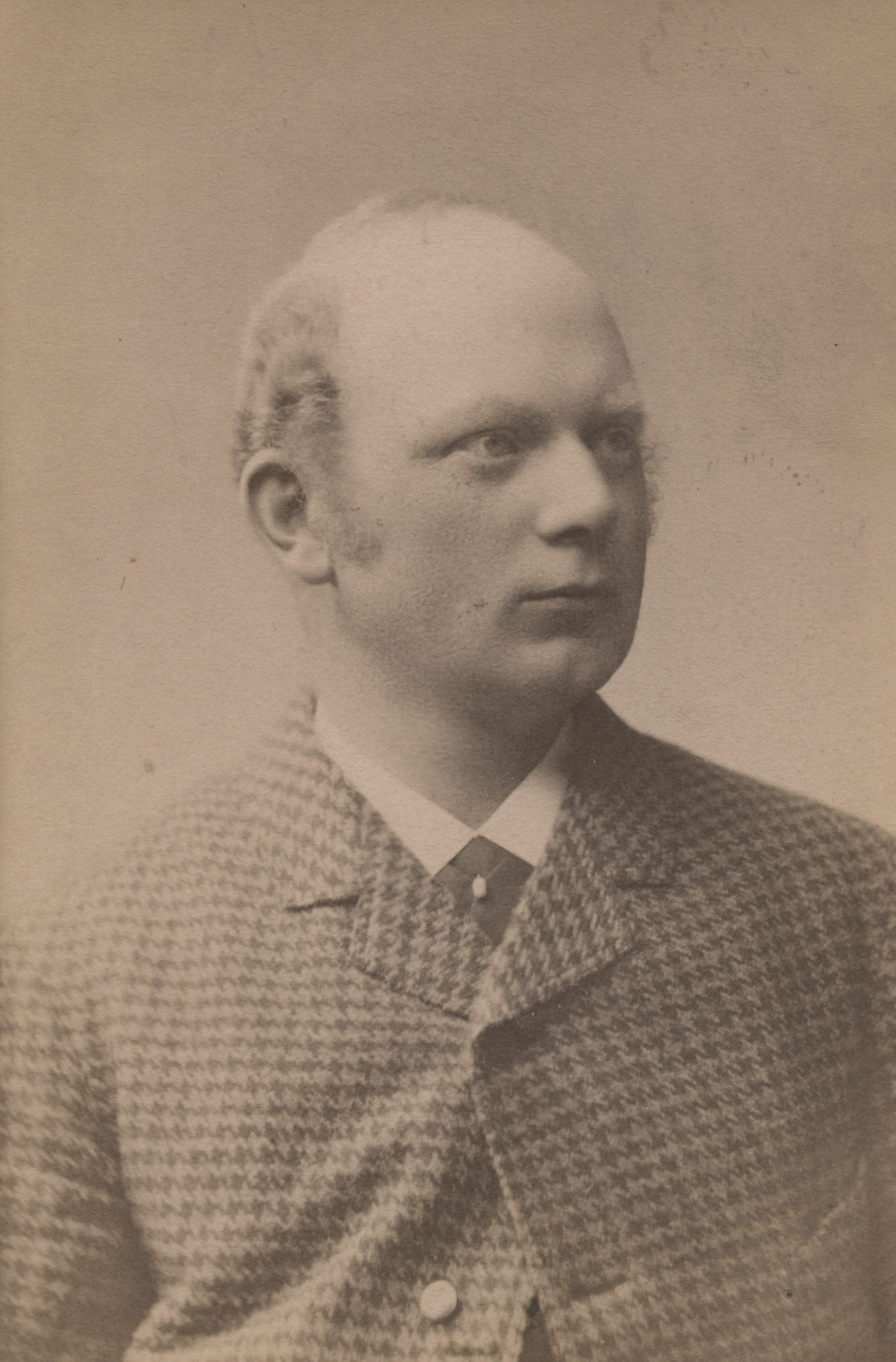
- Born: 2 February 1854; Vessigebro, Sweden
- Died: 23 September 1906 (aged 52); Gothenburg, Sweden
- Occupations: physician and author

August Leonard Bondeson (2 February 1854 - 23 September 1906) was a Swedish physician and author.

== Biography ==
August Bondeson was born in Vessigebro, Sweden. He was a student at Uppsala University from 1876, graduating with a med. kand. in 1884. He also studied at Karolinska Institute (1885-1886). He started as a practicing physician in Gothenburg in the fall of 1889.

Starting in 1876, he made summer trips for the study of folk languages and folk life in Värmlands Älvdal. He became one of the most popular depictors of popular Swedish culture, focusing in particular on common people's lives in southern Sweden, close to his birthplace. Tales such as Halländska sagor, samlade och berättade ("Collected and Narrated Hallandic Tales"), Allmogeberättelser ("Popular Tales") and Historiegubbar på Dal ("Tale-telling Old Mans at Dal") gave him a large and faithful audience. He is best known for his novel "John Chronschoughs memoarer från uppväksttiden och seminarieåren" ( "John Chronschough's memoirs" ), which is set at the teachers' seminary in Gothenburg in the early 1860s. The book was published in 1897 and was followed by an independent second part 1904.

He died in Gothenburg, Sweden during 1906. His former home Fågelboet was donated to the Halland Museum of Cultural History and is preserved almost unchanged since the days of Bondeson.

== Other Sources ==
- (in Swedish)County Museum of Halland:August Bondeson - vem var han?
