= Daniel Alexandersson =

Swedish footballer (born 1978)

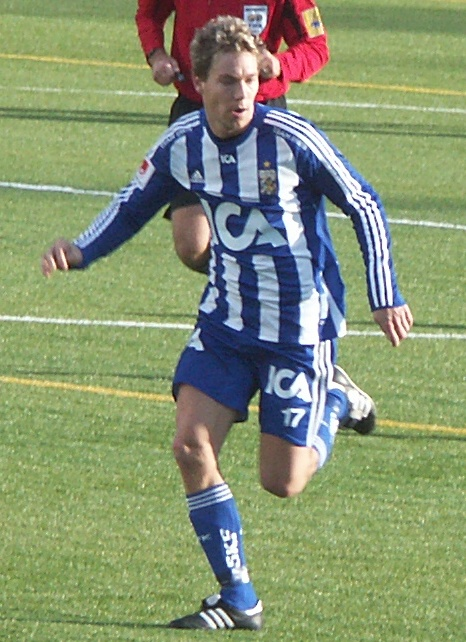
- Alexandersson during pre-season in 2009

Personal information
- Full name: Daniel Nils Alexandersson
- Date of birth: 3 December 1978 (age 47)
- Place of birth: Falkenberg, Sweden
- Height: 1.83 m (6 ft 0 in)
- Positions: Midfielder; forward

Youth career
- Vessigebro BK

Senior career*
Years	Team	Apps	(Gls)
1998–1999	Halmstads BK		
2000–2003	Falkenbergs FF	29	(11)
2004–2007	IF Elfsborg	100	(14)
2008–2009	IFK Göteborg	21	(0)
2010–2011	Falkenbergs FF	22	(10)
- * Club domestic league appearances and goals

Daniel Alexandersson (born 3 December 1978) is a Swedish former professional footballer who played as a midfielder or forward. He is the younger brother of Niclas Alexandersson.

== Career ==
Alexandersson started his youth career at Vessigebro BK and continued his early career at Halmstads BK, where his brother and father had played. He also played for Falkenbergs FF and Danish side Viborg FF before joining IF Elfsborg in 2005.

During his tenure at IF Elsborg, he was in the starting eleven. In the 2006 Allsvenskan, he scored five goals and won the Swedish Championship gold.

In 2008, Alexandersson left Elfsborg for IFK Göteborg where he played alongside his brother Niclas who retired after the 2008 season. In early 2010 Alexandersson chose to return to Falkenbergs FF. He retired after the 2011 season.

== Biography ==
Alexandersson was born in Falkenberg, Sweden to father Lennart Alexandersson who was a Halmstads BK player in the 1960s. He lived in Vessigebro as a child where he trained until moving to Halmstad.

== Honours ==
IF Elfsborg:

- Allsvenskan: 2006
- Supercupen: 2007

IFK Göteborg:

- Supercupen: 2008
