= Jari Ilola =

Finnish footballer (born 1978)

Personal information
- Date of birth: 24 November 1978 (age 47)
- Place of birth: Oulu, Finland
- Height: 1.86 m (6 ft 1 in)
- Position: Midfielder

Team information
- Current team: RoPS (sporting director)

Senior career*
| Years | Team | Apps | (Gls) |
| 1995–1997 | RoPS | 47 | (5) |
| 1998–2002 | HJK | 90 | (11) |
| 2003–2010 | Elfsborg | 85 | (0) |
| Total | | 222 | (16) |

International career
| 1998–2007 | Finland | 30 | (1) |

Managerial career
- 2013–: RoPS (sporting director)
- * Club domestic league appearances and goals

Jari Ilola (born 24 November 1978) is a Finnish former professional footballer who played for Finnish clubs Rovaniemen Palloseura (RoPS), HJK Helsinki, as well as for Swedish club IF Elfsborg. Ilola was part of the HJK squad that qualified for the 1998–99 UEFA Champions League group stage as the first and the only Finnish club ever to this date.

At international level, he made 30 appearances scoring one goal for the Finland national team.

He is currently the sporting director of his former club RoPS in Ykkönen.

== Career statistics ==
=== Club ===
Appearances and goals by club, season and competition
| Club | Season | League | | | Cup | | Europe | | Total | |
| Club | Season | Division | Apps | Goals | Apps | Goals | Apps | Goals | Apps | Goals |
|---|---|---|---|---|---|---|---|---|---|---|
| RoPS | 1995 | Veikkausliiga | 2 | 0 | – | | – | | 2 | 0 |
| RoPS | 1996 | Veikkausliiga | 23 | 4 | – | | – | | 23 | 4 |
| RoPS | 1997 | Veikkausliiga | 22 | 1 | – | | – | | 22 | 1 |
| RoPS | Total | | 47 | 5 | – | – | – | – | 47 | 5 |
| HJK Helsinki | 1998 | Veikkausliiga | 22 | 2 | 0 | 0 | 8 (Note: Includes UEFA Champions League) | 1 | 30 | 3 |
| HJK Helsinki | 1999 | Veikkausliiga | 27 | 2 | 0 | 0 | 3 (Note: Includes UEFA Cup) | 1 | 30 | 3 |
| HJK Helsinki | 2000 | Veikkausliiga | 1 | 0 | 0 | 0 | 0 | 0 | 1 | 0 |
| HJK Helsinki | 2001 | Veikkausliiga | 24 | 4 | 0 | 0 | 4 | 0 | 28 | 4 |
| HJK Helsinki | 2002 | Veikkausliiga | 16 | 3 | 0 | 0 | 2 | 0 | 18 | 3 |
| HJK Helsinki | Total | | 90 | 11 | – | – | 17 | 2 | 107 | 13 |
| Elfsborg | 2003 | Allsvenskan | 12 | 0 | | | | | 12 | 0 |
| Elfsborg | 2004 | Allsvenskan | 18 | 0 | | | 3 | 0 | 21 | 0 |
| Elfsborg | 2005 | Allsvenskan | 15 | 0 | | | | | 15 | 0 |
| Elfsborg | 2006 | Allsvenskan | 20 | 0 | | | | | 20 | 0 |
| Elfsborg | 2007 | Allsvenskan | 19 | 0 | 1 | 0 | 6 (Note: Includes UEFA Champions League and UEFA Cup) | 0 | 26 | 0 |
| Elfsborg | 2008 | Allsvenskan | 1 | 0 | | | 1 (Note: Includes UEFA Intertoto Cup) | 0 | 2 | 0 |
| Elfsborg | 2009 | Allsvenskan | 0 | 0 | | | | | 0 | 0 |
| Elfsborg | 2010 | Allsvenskan | 0 | 0 | | | | | 0 | 0 |
| Elfsborg | Total | | 85 | 0 | 1 | 0 | 10 | 0 | 96 | 0 |
| Career total | | | 222 | 16 | 1 | 0 | 27 | 2 | 250 | 18 |

=== International ===
Appearances and goals by national team and year
| National team | Year | Apps | Goals |
|---|---|---|---|
| Finland | 1998 | 2 | 0 |
| Finland | 1999 | 5 | 0 |
| Finland | 2000 | 0 | 0 |
| Finland | 2001 | 1 | 0 |
| Finland | 2002 | 3 | 1 |
| Finland | 2003 | 4 | 0 |
| Finland | 2004 | 3 | 0 |
| Finland | 2005 | 3 | 0 |
| Finland | 2006 | 7 | 0 |
| Finland | 2007 | 2 | 0 |
| Total | | 30 | 1 |

Scores and results list Finland's goal tally first, score column indicates score after each Ilola goal.

List of international goals scored by Jari Ilola
| No. | Date | Venue | Opponent | Score | Result | Competition |
|---|---|---|---|---|---|---|
| 1 | 7 January 2002 | Bahrain National Stadium, Riffa, Bahrain | Albania | 1–0 | 1–1 | Friendly |
