= Halmstads BK =

Association football club in Halmstad, Sweden

Halmstad
- Full name: Halmstads Bollklubb
- Nickname: Bollklubben (lit. 'The Ball Club')
- Short name: HBK
- Founded: 7 February 1914; 112 years ago
- Ground: Örjans Vall, Halmstad
- Capacity: 10,873
- Chairman: Pelle Nilsson
- Manager: Stuart Baxter
- League: Allsvenskan
- 2025: Allsvenskan, 11th
- Website: www.hbk.se
Home colours	Away colours	Third colours

Halmstads Bollklubb, also known simply as Halmstad ([ˈhǎlmsta, -stɑːd]) or (especially locally) HBK or Bollklubben, is a Swedish professional football club located in Halmstad in the county of Halland. The club, formed 7 February 1914 and approved membership in the Swedish Sports Confederation on 6 March the same year. The club competes in the highest tier of Swedish football, Allsvenskan, and has won four national championship titles and one national cup title. HBK is a member-controlled club.

The club gained some European recognition in October 1995, when they defeated the successful Italian club Parma A.C. 3–0 at Gamla Ullevi (in Gothenburg) in the first of two matches in the Cup Winners' Cup. However, their second encounter, in Parma in November of the same year, ended with a crushing 0–4 defeat, eliminating them from the tournament.

== History ==
=== In the beginning ===
In 1913 a group of youngsters, who called themselves Viking, wishing to create a more serious organization, met at Hotel Lugnet and decided to create an organization. They gave their new organization the name Halmstads Bollklubb and chose Axel Winberg as the club's first chairman. They also applied for membership in the Swedish Sports Confederation.

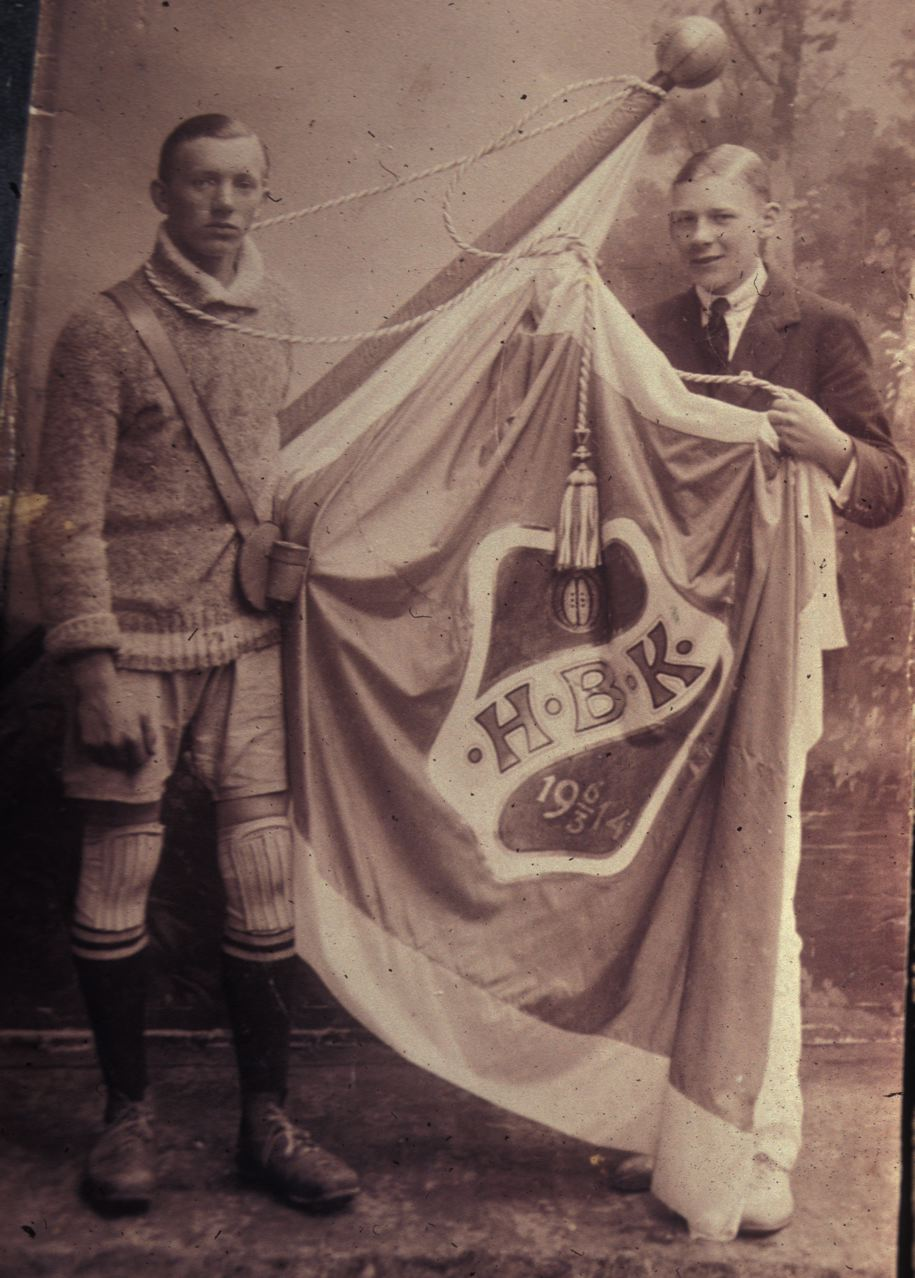
Charles Teodor Hansson (left) in early uniform and Axel Winberg (right)

Except for soccer, the club also played bandy during the early years.

On 6 March 1914, the club was allowed entrance to Swedish Sports Confederation; the following year they played in their first competition, Pokalserien, a local tournament in which they faced IS Halmia and Halmstads Kamraterna; the club ended up last with 2 points and 5–16 in goal difference, in 1916 the same result was seen again, but this time the club only managed to score 1 goal totally. In 1917 the club was able to defeat Halmstads Kamraterna twice and end up in second place behind IS Halmia; the same year an athletics department was made part of the club. The final in the district championship was reached in 1918, but yet again IS Halmia proved too strong. In 1919 the club was for the first time able to defeat IS Halmia and Gustav "Pytt" Söderholm became top goalscorer in the tournament. In 1919, a swimming department was made a part of the club.

In 1920 the club won its first district championship title by defeating Falkenbergs FF with 4–0 in the final and boxing was introduced by the club. In 1921 the club yet again won the championship, this time by defeating IS Halmia, the club also won Hallandspostens pokal after defeating Halmstads IF 5–0. The same year, a women's section was added to the athletics part of the club. Halmstads BK won the Bernhard Aronssons vandringspris after defeating IS Halmia in 1922; the club also won a series of tournaments in Jönköping, Malmö and Ängelholm, however the district championship was lost to Varberg this year. The local rivalry with Halmia was also seen in bandy. The first-ever bandy game between two organised teams in Halland, is thought to have been played between these rival clubs in 1922.

By winning Hallandsserien the club was able to reach Sydsvenskan in 1923, which led to third place in 1924 after Varbergs GIF and Malmö FF, an international exchange of matches was started with FC Rudolfshügel from Austria and Danish B 03. In 1925 the club won the district championship and came in second place in Sydsvenskan. Halmstads BK was able to win Sydsvenskan in 1926 and was to play qualifying matches against IF Elfsborg to reach Allsvenskan, however, Elfsborg proved to be too strong and won 2–1 after three matches. Halmstad only reached third place in 1927, a large series of injuries made the club use 32 different players in total. In 1928 the club took part in the newly formed Division 2 Söder; the club also employed amateur coach Henning Helgesson, Örjans Vall was only selected as the second-best arena in the series duo to the lack of warm showers. In 1929 Halmstads BK celebrated 15 years with a match against SpVgg Sülz from Cologne, Germany; 1600 people watched the game in heavy rain, SpVgg Sülz won 5–2, the club also failed to win Division 2 Söder after a hard race with Stattena IF and Redbergslids IK, ending up in third place.

=== Division 2 and upwards ===
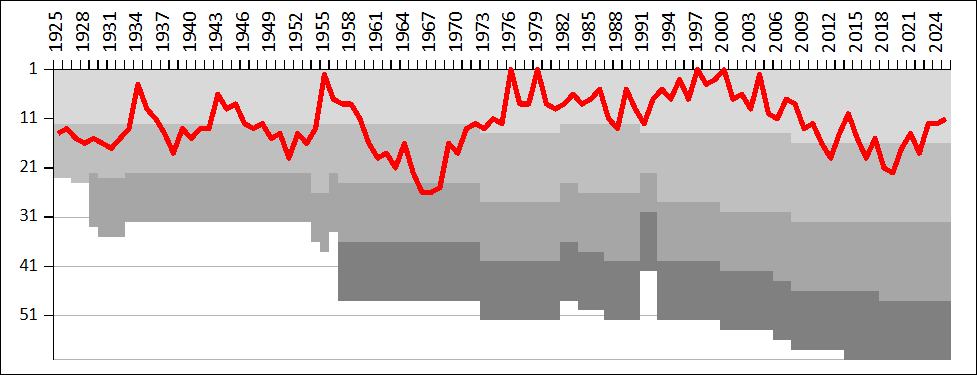
A chart showing the progress of Halmstads BK through the swedish football league system. The different shades of gray represent league divisions.

Halmstads BK started the next decade by ending up in 4th place in the league. A visit by CD Europa pulled a large audience, as the Spanish team won 6–5. After a late league start in 1931, due to heavy snowing, the club ended up in 4th place yet again. IS Halmia won the league in 1932 and in a campaign in the local newspapers tried to get the better Halmstads BK players to join the team. This failed, however, and after Halmstads BK defeated IS Halmia in a charity match for the city's unemployed, the swimmers also left the club and founded SK Laxen. Under the leadership of playing manager Gunnar Olsson Halmstads BK was able to reach Division 1, the top league at the time, in 1933 for the first time in the club's history, this after defeating BK Drott and Helsingborgs IF for the league title and then defeating Krokslätts FF with 4–0 totally. Unexpectedly, the club won bronze in their first season in the top league as when they finished in 4th place, Emil Carlsson also became the club's first player in the Swedish national team. The club was unable to repeat last season's result and ended up in 9th place in 1935, handball was also made a part of the club this year. Halmstads BK left the top league in 1936 after ending up second last, the club would have been able to stay if they had won over IK Sleipner in the last game, however, the team lost 2–4. The club was able to return to Division 1 in 1937, but a defeat against top competitor Helsingborgs IF saw them come in 2nd, former English professional player Harry Bruce became the first non-Swedish manager for the club. 1938 was a middle year for Halmstads BK as they ended up in 6th position at the end of the season, English club Sheffield United played a friendly against the club and won with 5–2. In 1939 the club celebrated its 25th year and won Division 2, however IFK Göteborg proved too strong in the qualify and won with 1–5 over the club.

Halmstads BK also took part in the bandy district championships in Halland in the 1930s.

Due to the ongoing Second World War Sweden focused more on military readiness in case of an invasion than on sport. This led to Halmstads BK being forced to use 29 different players during the season and the result came thereafter as the club ended up in 3rd place behind Malmö BI and winners IS Halmia. Halmstads BK was the superior team in 1941 Division 2 but failed to defeat GAIS in the qualify for Division 1. Halmstads BK won Division 2 after hard competition with local rivals IS Halmia in 1942 and in the qualify the club was able to defeat Lundby IF with 3–2. The club ended up in 6th place in 1943, only 1 point from earning a medal. Halmstad was close to falling out of the top division in 1944 but a series of victories saved them in the end. 1945 saw the club end up in 8th place. In 1946 the club ended up second from last after a poor season, however the club's youth squad won the unofficial youth championship, first defeating IFK Göteborg and then playing 4–4 against AIK in the final, winning on drawing the winning lot, in the youth squad there were players like Sylve Bengtsson, Gunnar Johansson, Olle Ericsson, Östen Ståhl and Åke Hallström, who all later became noted players in the club's history. Halmstads BK returned to Division 1 after only 1 season in Division 2, the club crushed Örgryte IS with 6–1 in the 1947 qualify, the team also played their first match outside Sweden this year, they defeated Helsingør IF with 8–2 and the youth squad won the youth championship again after defeating Djurgårdens IF with 2–1. Just like the year before Halmstads BK time in Division 1 only became 1 year as they ended up in last place in 1948. In 1949 Kalmar FF proved too strong and Halmstads BK ended up in 3rd place in the league, the club also refused to participate in the district championship as a protest to the "unsporting behavior" the district association had shown the club the previous year.

The 1950s started poorly as the club reached 2nd place behind Råå IF; several injuries to key players disturbed the season, and in 1951 the club board decided to rejuvenate the squad and which led to a 7th place. In 1952 the club yet again ended up in 2nd place, the club also went on a trip, first to Germany, where they played a series of matches, and then to the French Riviera, where the club played a game and enjoyed the weather and beach, they then returned home and played a game against Brazilian team Corinthians with a mixed team of Halmstads BK and IS Halmia players, the Brazilians won with 10–1, Sylve Bengtsson returned from the 1952 Summer Olympics with a bronze medal. 1953 saw a change in the league system and Halmstads BK was lucky as the club was able to stay only because of better goal difference as 6 teams was relegated. Things changed in 1954 as Halmstads BK dominated the new league and won promotion with 12 points ahead of IK Sleipner in second place, then made yet again a trip south, this time to North Africa and Spain, bowling was added to the club. Halmstads BK reached their best position so far in 1954–55 season as the club ended up in 2nd place, winning Stora Silvret (eng: The Big Silver), then during 1955–56 season, Halmstads BK biggest victory was recorded as they club crushed Västerås SK with 9–0, Östen Ståhl scored 6 goals in the match, Sylve Bengtsson also became the league's top goal scorer with 22 goals, Halmstads BK ended in 7th position. Just as in the beginning of the decade the end was far from good, the club ended up in 8th place both in 1957 and 1958, during 1958 Sweden hosted FIFA World Cup and 2 matches, Northern Ireland against Czechoslovakia (1–0) and Argentina against Northern Ireland (3–1) were played at Örjans Vall, and in 1959 the club was relegated back to Division 2 after ending up second to last.

=== The dark decade ===
The 1960s wasn't Halmstads BK's decade, the club ended up in 4th place in 1960 even after Kjell "Lill-Goggo" Karlsson and Sylve Bengtsson had scored 34 goals together, in 1961 the club ended up in 7th position after poor play, in 1962 the club went through a rejuvenation and only won 9 matches out of 22, making the club end in 6th place, then in 1963 two victories against Norrby IF and IK Oddevold helped the club to 9th place, this year saw ice hockey become a part of the club's organization. Halmstads BK won Division 2 in 1964, but in the new qualify for Allsvenskan, a group of the four different Division 2 winners, the club played poorly and ended up last. 1965 was the darkest year for the club so far as it was relegated to Division 3 for the first time ever in club history, it took the club 2 years to return Division 2 again after ending up in 2nd place both 1966 and 1967, then in 1968 the club dominated Division 3 and had a goal difference of 87–23, a record in the Swedish league system, the ice hockey left the organization and started their own. The club made a strong return in Division 2 and ended up in 4th position, Lennart Alexandersson, Ingvar Andersson, Roland Fransson and Lars Nordin became the first contracted players in the club.

=== Champions ===
With only 3 point in total in all away games saw Halmstads BK end up in 6th place in 1970. The year 1971 was turbulent, as manager Janne Holmberg left in the middle of the season due to a dispute with the board. Former top player Sylve Bengtsson replaced him and the club subsequently defeated Perstorps SK in the league final, securing 2nd place and qualifying for promotion to Allsvenskan. The spell in the top league lasted only 1 year, however, as the club ended up last, scoring only 14 goals that year. 1973 saw the club again achieve promotion, this time under the leadership of Sven Agne Larsson, who led the club through 20 games in a row without a defeat. The club spent the next two years in Allsvenskan fighting off relegation, finishing in 11th place in 1974 and, in 1975, only surviving by beating GAIS on goal difference. In 1976 Halmstads BK hired Roy Hodgson as new manager and success came immediately, as the club went on to win Allsvenskan for the first time ever. The title was won in the second last game against IFK Norrköping. The last match against Östers IF was seen by 16000 people cheering for the team. Halmstads BK ended up in 8th place in 1977 season and Dynamo Dresden proved too strong in the first round of European Cup. Yet again the club ended in 8th place in 1978. Mats Jingblad was moved up from the club's youth system this year. Halmstads BK won their second title in 1979.

Just like after last time winning Allsvenskan, Halmstad ended up in 8th place in 1980 and in the European Cup Danish Esbjerg fB proved too strong with 0–0 home and 2–3 away, Roy Hodgson also left during the autumn to take over Bristol City. To the 1981 season Halmstads BK hired Dutch manager Jan Mak and with him came Frank Schinkels, the first non Swedish player in the club, but with a poor start saw the club end up in 9th place. In 1982 the club ended up in 8th and earned a spot in the play-off, but IFK Göteborg proved too strong with 2–4 totally. In 1983 the club climbed two positions much due to British goalkeeper Ken Allen. 1984 started with a fight between the board and manager Jan Mak and it ended it with Jan Mak leaving the club, he was replaced by Stefan Lundin, the club reached 8th place and IFK Göteborg proved too strong in the play-off again. Halmstads BK topt the table during the spring of 1985 but a poor ending of the season saw the club end in 7th place. During the middle of the 1986 season Stefan Lundin left the club for Portugies C.S. Marítimo and was replaced by Kenneth Rosén, the season ended with a 5th place and Stig Nilsson became the new chairman. A series of injuries on keyplayers saw the club end up second to last and was relegated from Allsvenskan for the first time in 14 years in 1987. Stuart Baxter became new manager in 1988 and ever after losing several keyplayers and trailing after Mjällby AIF with 7 point, the club was able to claim the top spot on better goal difference. The club ended up in a 5th place in their return to Allsvenskan in 1989.

=== Allsvenskan and Europe ===
The 1990s decade started far from promising for the club; in 1990 season the club ended in 9th place and a new play-off was started in 1991, Halmstads BK just missed the play-off on goal difference to IFK Norrköping, ending up in 7th place and was forced to play relegation play-off against team 8–10 in Allsvenskan and the Division 1 champions, it went poorly and the club was relegated. 1992 saw two league victories for Halmstads BK, first Division 1 Södra and then in the promotion/relegation play-off for Allsvenskan. Henrik Bertilsson became Allsvenskan's top goalscorer in 1993 with 18 goals, sharing the top spot with Trelleborgs FF's Mats Lilienberg, this helped the club to a 5th place. The club ended up in 7th place in 1994 and Henrik Bertillson left for French FC Martigues, it went better for the youth squad as they reached the final in the youth championship, but Djurgårdens IF proved too strong and won with 1–0. 1995 became a hard year for Halmstads BK supporters to forget as they for the first time ever won Svenska Cupen and the club ended up in 3rd place, winning Lilla Silvret, but it was the home match against Parma F.C. in the UEFA Cup Winners' Cup that drew most attention as Halmstads BK won with 3–0 on Gamla Ullevi in Gothenburg, however the returned ended with a major defeat, 4–0 to Parma. Tom Prahl took over as manager in 1996 and lead the team to a 7th place in Allsvenskan and in the first round of the UEFA Cup Newcastle United proved the stronger team. In 1997 Halmstads BK celebrated their third championship title after 3–0 in the last game against Ljungskile SK, Mats Lilienberg, now in Halmstads BK, became league top goalscorer with 14 goals, alongside Christer Mattiasson, IF Elfsborg, and Dan Sahlin, Örebro SK. 1998 saw the club end up in 8th place and the UEFA Champions League adventured ended quickly after defeat with 3–2 in total against Litex Lovech, from Bulgaria, in the first qualifying round, own product Freddie Ljungberg was sold to Arsenal F.C. for 40 million SEK. A poor start of the 1999 season didn't prevent Halmstads BK from fighting for the league title until the second last match, the club had to be satisfied with 3rd place and Lilla Silvret.

Halmstads BK facing RC Lens on Stade Félix-Bollaert in 2005–06 UEFA Cup, Le 12 Lensois and Les Tigers in the background.

Halmstads BK started the new millennium with taking their fourth Allsvenskan title, they also reached second round in the UEFA Cup after defeating S.L. Benfica, but then TSV 1860 München proved too strong, Halmstad also became the last team to win the Von Rosen Trophy as it was revealed that Clarence von Rosen was a Nazi sympathiser, it was replaced in 2001 with the Lennart Johansson Trophy. Stefan Selakovic became league top goalscorer with 15 goals as the club ended 7th place, R.S.C. Anderlecht was too strong in the UEFA Champions League third qualifying round and then Sporting Clube de Portugal in the second round of the UEFA Cup, Tom Prahl left the club for Allsvenskan rival Malmö FF and was replaced by former Swedish international player Jonas Thern. 2002 started badly for the club as after 15 rounds it lay dead last, but a spell of 11 games undefeated saw the club get saved from relegation. During the 2003 season Halmstad had a chance for a medal until the end of the season where the club lost 7 of the 8 last games and ended up in 9th place, Jonas Thern decided to leave the club during the autumn and assistant manager Janne Andersson became new manager. Halmstads BK was 36 minutes from winning their fifth Allsvenskan title after leading Allsvenskan most of the season, but only managed 1–1 against IFK Göteborg in the last game, while Malmö FF, on the same point prior to the last match, managed to win with 1–0 against IF Elfsborg, Markus Rosenberg, on loan from Malmö FF, became league top goalscorer with 14 goals. 2005 became a bad year for Halmstads BK as they struggled to a 10th place, Gunnar Heidar Thorvaldsson became league top goalscorer with 16 goals, however in Europe things went a bit better as the club managed to qualify for the new group stage in the UEFA Cup after winning on away goal against last year runners-up Sporting Clube de Portugal, however the club failed to take a single point in the group and only scored 1 goal. 2006 was much like the year before and the club didn't score until the 7th match of the season when defender Per "Texas" Johansson scored the only goal of the match against Örgryte IS, the club ended in 11th place. 2007 started promising and the club was one of the teams fighting for the Allsvenskan title until the 18 round, in the game against IFK Göteborg, Finnish goalkeeper Magnus Bahne got injured and missed the rest of the season, Kazakh goalkeeper David Loriya was brought in, but in his seven games Halmstads BK failed to win a single one and in the last game, away against Helsingborgs IF, the club lost with 0–9, the second biggest defeat in the club history; Halmstads BK ended up in 7th place.

Halmstads BK supporters (Kvastarna) in Lens, France, prior to a game against RC Lens in UEFA Cup 2005-06.

=== Relegation to Superettan ===
Halmstad began the 2008 Allsvenskan season well enough, with four wins and three ties after the first ten rounds. The team continued on in this fashion, ending at a respectable 8th place with 41 points. But the following season did not end nearly as good. The team began very impressively, with consecutive wins and very few losses. But, following several losses, the team eventually found themselves in the bottom region of the table. However, the team ended the season better and finished 13th with 32 points, just three points from having to play in a relegation playoff series.

The 2011 season was not a good season for neither Halmstad nor its fans. With just 14 points after 26 rounds, and at least another 10 points needed to reach the relegation playoffs, Halmstad had to win against Syrianska FC in the following round. Halmstad lost the game 1–0 and thus were relegated to Superettan for the 2012 season, after 19 consecutive seasons in Allsvenskan.

=== Bouncing back ===
HBK was now back in the second division, a division they had been away for 19 years. But as previously 4 times, they quickly bounced back through a play-off win against GIF Sundsvall. The next year, 2013, ended with a 14th place and once again GIF Sundsvall was the opponent in the play-offs. But as in 2012 HBK ended up as the winner and could celebrate their 100-year anniversary in the top division.

== Supporters ==
Halmstads BK's official supporter group is Bollklubben Support, it was earlier known as Kvastarna (eng: The Brooms), and were created in 1995, they are located in the center of the terrace section of Örjans Vall during the home games. There is also 2 other supporter group´s known as “Ultras Halmstad” Est 2023 & “Boys In Blue”, which were formed in 2021. Ultras Halmstad & Boys In Blue belong´s to the supporter category called “Ultras”.

Halmstads BK used to have an average of 4000–6000 spectators when playing home, when playing teams like Djurgårdens IF, IFK Göteborg or Malmö FF then audience it could rise to 8000-10000 people, however much because of the away supporters. Today the attendance is more modest and rises to maximum of 5000–6000 on the "big" games.

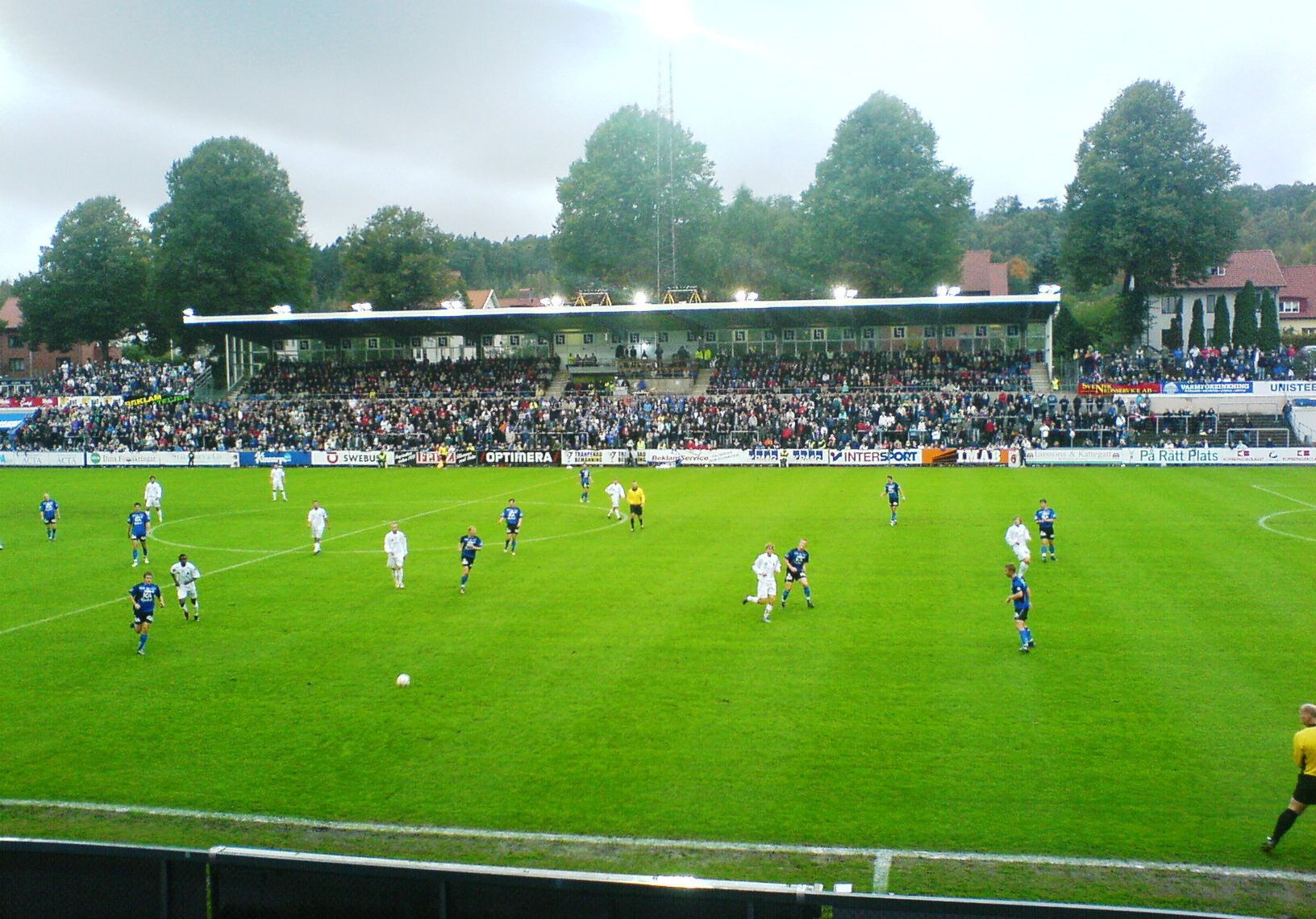
Halmstads BK playing Gefle IF in Allsvenskan 2007 on Örjans Vall.

== Stadium ==
Halmstads BK plays it home matches on Örjans Vall, which they share together with local rivals IS Halmia. However, since Örjans Vall is an old stadium, built in 1922, it doesn't meet the present European demands for stadiums, forcing Halmstads BK to play their European games on Olympia, Helsingborg, or at Ullevi, Gothenburg.

Örjans Vall was the site of 2 games during the 1958 FIFA World Cup, Northern Ireland–Czechoslovakia and Argentina–Northern Ireland.

== Match programmes and newspaper ==
In 2006 all Swedish clubs in Allsvenskan was given an offer from Aftonbladet to print their match programmes, aside from AIK, Djurgårdens IF and Hammarby IF, who signed a deal with newspaper competitor Expressen. Halmstads BK rejected the offer and chose to print their own match program, making them the only club in the top league with their own match programme at the time.

The club also print a minor newspaper known as Tidningen HBK (eng: Newspaper HBK), which contains interviews with players, fans and other people connected to the club. It comes out as a supplement to the local newspaper Hallandsposten. It is also available to download on the club's homepage.

== In popular culture ==
Swedish comedians Hans Alfredson and Tage Danielsson, also known as Hasse och Tage, made a skit about English football manager Bob Houghton, though some consider it to be about former HBK manager Roy Hodgson when Halmstads BK won Allsvenskan in 1976, known as Fotbollstränare Bob Lindeman (Eng: Football manager Bob Lindeman).

== Players ==
=== First-team squad ===
As of 3 September 2026

Note: Flags indicate national team as defined under FIFA eligibility rules; some limited exceptions apply. Players may hold more than one non-FIFA nationality.

No.	Pos.	Nation	Player
1	GK	SWE	Tim Rönning
3	DF	SWE	Gabriel Wallentin
4	DF	SWE	Filip Schyberg
5	DF	DEN	Pascal Gregor
6	MF	SWE	Joel Allansson (captain)
7	FW	CIV	Daniel Koffi
8	MF	FIN	Niilo Mäenpää
9	FW	PLE	Omar Faraj
11	FW	SWE	Ludvig Arvidsson
14	MF	SWE	Hussein Carneil
16	DF	EST	Erko Jonne Tõugjas
17	DF	SWE	André Boman

No.	Pos.	Nation	Player
18	FW	SWE	Malte Persson
19	FW	CIV	Marvin Illary
21	FW	SWE	Joel Nilsson
22	MF	SWE	Oliver Kapsimalis
23	FW	SWE	Ajdin Zeljković
24	DF	TUN	Rami Kaib
25	MF	SWE	Aleksander Damnjanovic Nilsson
27	MF	FRA	Rocco Ascone (vice-captain)
28	MF	GER	Tom Trybull
31	MF	GHA	Iddrisu Moro
35	GK	SWE	Adam Wihed

=== Out on loan ===
As of 26 March 2026

Note: Flags indicate national team as defined under FIFA eligibility rules; some limited exceptions apply. Players may hold more than one non-FIFA nationality.

No.	Pos.	Nation	Player
—	MF	SWE	Albin Ahlstrand (at Hässleholms IF until 30 November 2026)
—	MF	SWE	Måns Andersson (at Laholms until 30 November 2026)

No.	Pos.	Nation	Player
—	MF	SWE	Vincent Johansson (at Laholms until 30 November 2026)
—	DF	SWE	Hjalmar Åberg (at Laholms until 30 November 2026)

=== Notable players ===
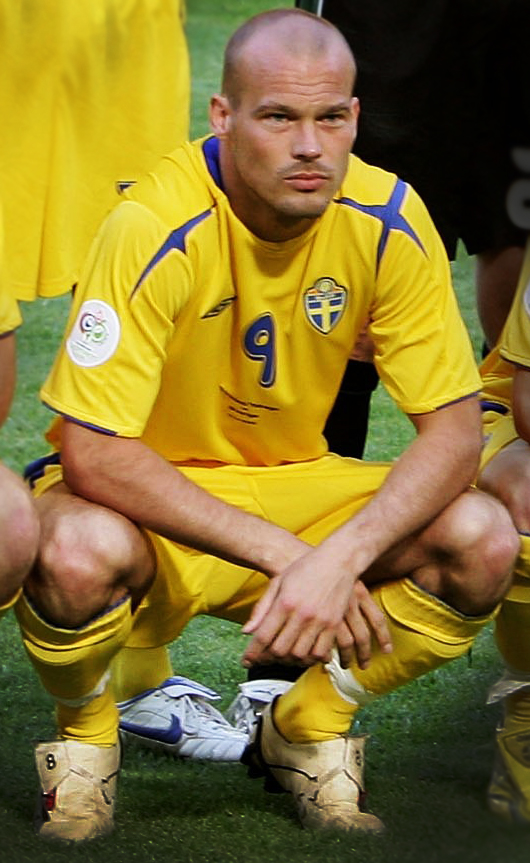
Freddie Ljungberg in 2006, Halmstads BK's most awarded player

List criteria:

- player has made 250 or more appearances in Allsvenskan for the club, or
- player has won Guldbollen, or
- player has received more than 50 caps for Sweden or other national team.

Name	Years	Games	Goals	Guldbollen	National team
(Sweden) Torbjörn Arvidsson	1989–2005	306	22		
(Sweden) Tommy Jönsson	1989–2005	304	29		
(Sweden) Håkan Svensson	1990–2002	253	0		
(Sweden) Freddie Ljungberg	1994–1998	79	10	2002; 2006	75 games for Sweden
(Sweden) Mikael Nilsson	2000–2004	103	17		64 games for Sweden
(Sweden) Niclas Alexandersson	1989–1995	157	29		109 games for Sweden
(North Macedonia) Artim Šakiri	1997–1998	43	8		75 games for Macedonia
(Ghana) Yaw Preko	2004–2005	49	11		68 games for Ghana
(Lithuania) Tomas Žvirgždauskas	2002–2011	211	6		56 games for Lithuania

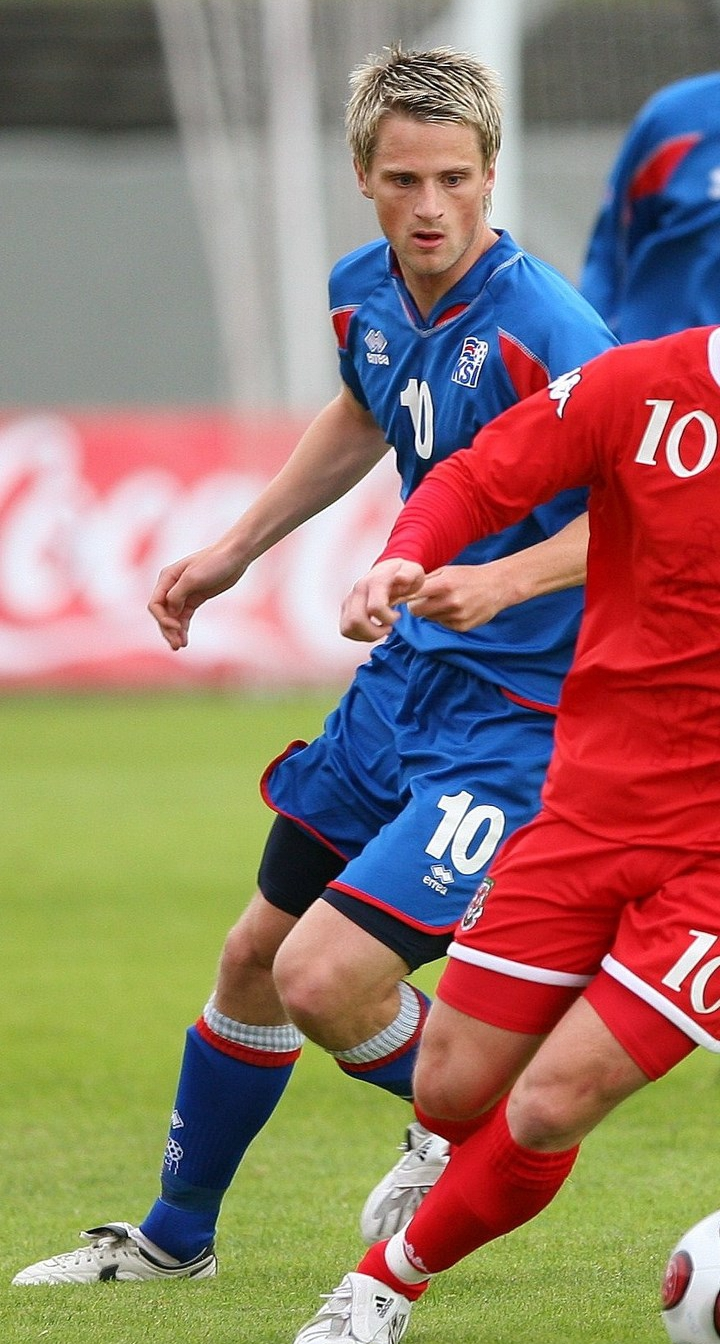
Gunnar Heiðar Þorvaldsson, the most recent top goalscorer

=== Allsvenskan top goalscorers ===
Name	Season	Goals	Notes
(Sweden) Sylve Bengtsson	1956	22	
(Sweden) Rutger Backe	1976	21	
(Sweden) Henrik Bertilsson	1993	18	Shared with Mats Lilienberg
(Sweden) Mats Lilienberg	1997	14	Shared with Christer Mattiasson and Dan Sahlin
(Sweden) Stefan Selaković	2001	15	
(Sweden) Markus Rosenberg	2004	14	
(Iceland) Gunnar Heiðar Þorvaldsson	2005	16	

== Technical staff ==
As of 1 September 2025.

Role	Name
Head Coach	(Scotland) Stuart Baxter (interim)
Assistant coach	(Sweden) Hristijan Cvetkovski
Assistant coach	(Sweden) Andreas Johansson
Assistant coach	(Sweden) Adam Larsson
Goalkeeping coach	(Sweden) Dennis Nilsson
Physiotherapist	(Morocco) (Sweden) Simon Bakkioui

== Noted managers ==
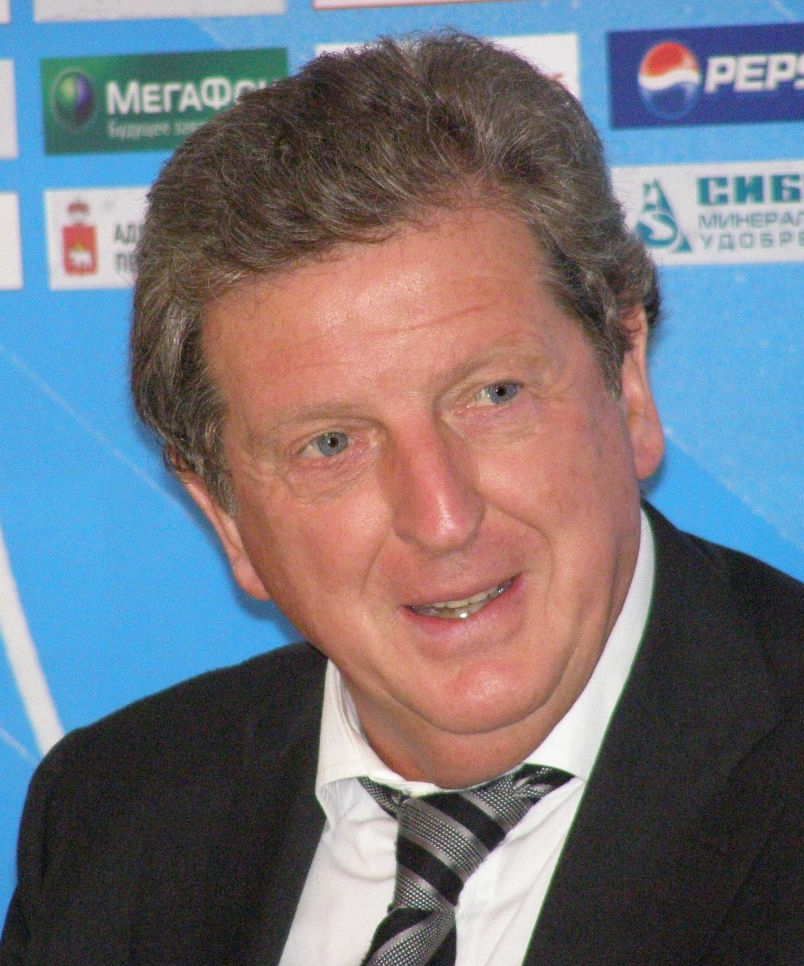
Roy Hodgson managed Halmstads to their first Allsvenska title

This is a list of managers who have won one or more titles at the club.

Name	Years	Allsvenskan	Svenska Cupen
(England) Roy Hodgson	1976–1980	1976; 1979	—
(Sweden) Mats Jingblad	1992–1995	—	1995
(Sweden) Tom Prahl	1996–2001	1997; 2000	—

== Achievements ==
=== Domestic ===
==== Domestic ====
- Swedish Champions (Note: The title of "Swedish Champions" has been awarded to the winner of four different competitions over the years. Between 1896 and 1925 the title was awarded to the winner of Svenska Mästerskapet, a stand-alone cup tournament. No club were given the title between 1926 and 1930 even though the first-tier league Allsvenskan was played. In 1931 the title was reinstated and awarded to the winner of Allsvenskan. Between 1982 and 1990 a play-off in cup format was held at the end of the league season to decide the champions. After the play-off format in 1991 and 1992 the title was decided by the winner of Mästerskapsserien, an additional league after the end of Allsvenskan. Since the 1993 season the title has once again been awarded to the winner of Allsvenskan.)
  - Winners (4): 1976, 1979, 1997, 2000

==== League ====
- Allsvenskan (Tier 1)
  - Winners (4): 1976, 1979, 1997, 2000
  - Runners-up (2): 1954–55, 2004
- Superettan (Tier 2)
  - Winners (1): 2020
- Division 1 Södra (Tier 2)
  - Winners (2): 1988, 1992
- Division 2 (Tier 2) (Note: This includes different regional divisions within the league: Division 2 Sydsvenska Serien, Division 2 Södra, Division 2 Sydvästra, Division 2 Götaland, Division 2 Västra Götaland and Division 2 Södra Götaland.)
  - Winners (10): 1925–26, 1932–33, 1938–39, 1940–41, 1941–42, 1946–47, 1953–54, 1964, 1971, 1973
  - Runner-up (4): 1924–25, 1936–37, 1949–50, 1951–52
- Division 3 Sydvästra Götaland (Tier 3)
  - Winners (1): 1968
  - Runner-up (2): 1966, 1967
- Hallandsserien (Tier 3)
  - Winners (2): 1921–22, 1922–23

==== Cups ====
- Svenska Cupen
  - Winners (1): 1994–95

== Records ==
- Most appearances, Allsvenskan: 306, Torbjörn Arvidsson (1989–2004)
- Most goals scored, Allsvenskan: 77, Rutger Backe (1972–1981)
- Most appearances, in European cups: 28, Torbjörn Arvidsson (1989–2004), Fredrik Andersson (1990–2001)
- Most goals scored, in European cups: 11, Stefan Selakovic (1996–2001)
- Biggest victory: 12–0 vs. Fässbergs IK, 7 September 1968
- Biggest victory, Allsvenskan: 9–0 vs. Västerås SK, 23 October 1955
- Biggest defeat: 0–12 vs Malmö FF, 3 June 1943
- Highest attendance (before renovation): 19 783 vs. Djurgårdens IF, 10 June 1955
- Highest attendance (after renovation): 16 867 vs. IFK Göteborg, 30 October 2004
