= Joakim Sjöhage =

Swedish footballer

Personal information
- Full name: Joakim Sjöhage
- Date of birth: 27 September 1986 (age 40)
- Place of birth: Målsryd, Sweden
- Height: 1.82 m (6 ft 0 in)
- Position: Striker

Youth career
- Målsryds IF
- Dalsjöfors GoIF
- Elfsborg

Senior career*
| Years | Team | Apps | (Gls) |
| 2004–2007 | Elfsborg | 57 | (10) |
| 2007–2008 | Brann | 3 | (0) |
| 2008 | → Elfsborg (loan) | 22 | (2) |
| 2009–2011 | Trelleborgs FF | 48 | (8) |
| 2012–2013 | Varbergs BoIS | 24 | (6) |
| 2013 | → Tvååkers IF (loan) | 10 | (11) |
| 2014–2016 | Tvååkers IF | 54 | (41) |
| Total | | 218 | (78) |

International career
| 2005 | Sweden U19 | 4 | (0) |
| 2005–2007 | Sweden U21 | 6 | (0) |
- * Club domestic league appearances and goals

Joakim Sjöhage (born 27 September 1986) is a Swedish former professional footballer who played as a striker. In 2006 and 2007, respectively, he won Allsvenskan and Tippeligaen, the top divisions of Sweden and Norway. With Elfsborg, he also won Supercupen in 2007.

== Career ==
Sjöhage started his career in the Swedish club IF Elfsborg where he won the Swedish Premier League in 2006 and Supercupen in 2007.

On 3 July 2007, it was reported that Norwegian Premier League title contenders Brann were interested in his signature. He signed a 3.5-year deal with Brann on 4 July 2007.

He got his debut for Brann on 29 July 2007, when he got a couple of minutes against Strømsgodset IF in the Norwegian Premier League.

He struggled to get a regular place in Mons Ivar Mjeldes first eleven, finding himself fourth in line for a starting position after international strikers Thorstein Helstad, Robbie Winters and Ármann Smári Björnsson, even after Bengt Sæternes left for the Danish team Odense BK.

In 2008, he returned to Elfsborg on loan, with an option to make the move permanent, however at the end of the season it was reported that he had signed for Trelleborgs FF. Following the end of the 2011 season Sjöhage's contract with Trelleborg ended and he decided to leave the club for Varbergs BoIS, newelly promoted to Superettan from Division 1 Södra.

Sjöhage later moved on to Tvååkers IF in Swedish Football Division 2 Västra Götaland (level 4). He played a key role when the team was promoted to Division 1 Södra in 2015, as he was the top scorer and named the best attacker of the Västra Götaland division this season, having scored 22 goals and made nine assists. However, the first half of the 2016 season was ruined due to a broken leg. Sjöhage retired after the 2016 season.

== Honours ==
Elfsborg

- Allsvenskan: 2006
- Supercupen: 2007

Brann

- Tippeligaen: 2007
