= Mathias Svensson =

Swedish footballer (born 1974)

Personal information
- Full name: Johan Mathias Svensson
- Date of birth: 24 September 1974 (age 52)
- Place of birth: Borås, Sweden
- Position: Striker

Senior career*
Years	Team	Apps	(Gls)
1996	Elfsborg	22	(15)
1996–1998	Portsmouth	45	(10)
1998	Tirol Innsbruck	6	(1)
1998–2000	Crystal Palace	32	(10)
2000–2003	Charlton Athletic	70	(8)
2003	→ Derby County (loan)	10	(3)
2003–2005	Norwich City	42	(11)
2005–2008	Elfsborg	48	(9)
Total		275	(67)

International career
1997	Sweden B	1	(1)
1997–2001	Sweden	3	(0)
- * Club domestic league appearances and goals

Johan Mathias Svensson (born 24 September 1974) is a Swedish former professional footballer who played as a striker. Starting off his career with IF Elfsborg in the mid-1990s, he spent most of his career in England before retiring at Elfsborg in 2008. A full international between 1997 and 2001, he won three caps for the Sweden national team.

== Club career ==
Svensson began his career with Elfsborg, and was their top scorer when they won promotion to Allsvenskan in 1996. Following his success, he moved to England in the same year to play for Portsmouth. He then moved to Crystal Palace and Charlton, and had a spell on loan with Derby County before joining Norwich in December 2003, making his debut for the Canaries in the East Anglian Derby against Ipswich Town at Portman Road.

Norwich paid an initial fee of £50,000 for Svensson, which rose to £300,000 when the Canaries won promotion at the end of that season. It took Svensson some time to find his form at Norwich and he came in for criticism from some City supporters. However, he began scoring goals towards the end of the season – including two in a 5–3 win at Burnley and a long range effort in a televised match against Wigan – and ended the season with a first division championship medal as The Canaries won promotion to the Premiership.

Svensson scored four times in Norwich's premiership season of 2004–05, including two in a 3–2 win against Bolton Wanderers. Norwich were relegated at the end of the season and a clause in Svensson's contract allowed him to move to a top flight club in another country in the event that such a club showed interest to him. IF Elfsborg offered Norwich £100,000 for Svensson, and he returned to the club where he began his career.

After his return to Elfsborg Svensson played his first Allsvenskan game on 4 July 2005 against Kalmar FF, and he scored the only goal of the game. The 2006 season was very successful for Svensson. He started all games and scored six goals, and at the end of the season he won the first title of his career, as Elfsborg were crowned Swedish champions. In 2008, he was forced to retire due to a knee injury. He remained at Elfsborg, with various duties.

== International career ==
Svensson made his full international debut for Sweden in a friendly 1–0 win against Israel on 12 March 1997, replacing Kennet Andersson in the 62nd minute. He appeared once for the Sweden B team on 21 May 1997, scoring the only goal in a 1–0 win against Poland. He made his competitive international debut for Sweden on 6 June 2001 in a 2002 FIFA World Cup qualifier against Moldova, replacing Magnus Svensson in the 83rd minute of a 6–0 win. In total, Svensson won three caps during an international career that spanned between 1997 and 2001.

== Career statistics ==
=== International ===
Appearances and goals by national team and year
National team	Year	Apps	Goals
Sweden	1997	2	0
Sweden	1998	0	0
Sweden	1999	0	0
Sweden	2000	0	0
Sweden	2001	1	0
Total		3	0

== Honours ==
Charlton Athletic

- Football League First Division: 1999–2000

Norwich City

- Football League First Division: 2003–04

IF Elfsborg

- Allsvenskan: 2006
