= List of Sweden international footballers =

The Sweden men's national football team has traditionally been a strong team in international football, with twelve World Cup appearances—collecting one silver and two bronze medals—and three medals in the Olympics, including one gold. Sweden played its first international game against Norway in 1908 and competed in an international tournament, the Summer Olympics, for the first time the same year. Since then, Sweden has regularly qualified for the World Cup and the Olympics as well as the European Championships. The best results in the World Cup are a second place (as hosts) in the 1958 and two third places in 1950 and 1994. In the Olympics, Sweden has won the gold medal in 1948 as well as two bronze medals in 1924 and 1952. The best result in the European Championship is a semi-final loss in 1992 as hosts of the tournament.

Ten Swedish players are in the FIFA Century Club, having earned 100 or more caps. Anders Svensson is the most capped Swedish player at 148 appearances, fifth most of all European internationals. Björn Nordqvist, with 115 caps for Sweden, was the World record holder for international caps when he ended his national team career in 1978. With 62 goals in 116 caps, Zlatan Ibrahimović is the top scorer for the national team, Sven Rydell in second place with 49 goals in only 43 caps and Gunnar Nordahl in third with 43 goals in only 33 caps. Henrik Larsson with 37 goals in fourth place shares a World Cup record for the longest period between a player's first and last goals, with 12 years as he scored in both the 1994 and 2006 tournaments.

Three Sweden internationals have been top scorers in a major international tournament, Herbert Carlsson (not included in this list at only 20 caps) at the 1920 Olympics, Gunnar Nordahl at the 1948 Olympics and Tomas Brolin at the Euro 1992. No Swedish player has been awarded the World Cup Golden Boot, but Kennet Andersson won the Silver Boot in 1994 with Martin Dahlin winning the Bronze Boot in the same tournament. The last award was also won by Ralf Edström in 1974. Three Swedish players have been chosen for the World Cup All-Star Team, Erik Nilsson in 1950, Gunnar Gren in 1958 and Tomas Brolin in 1994.

The following list of Sweden international footballers covers all football players with 30 or more official caps for the Sweden men's national football team. The players are listed here sorted first by the total number of caps, and then by last name. Substitute appearances are included.

== Key ==
	Guldbollen winner, awarded since 1946.
	Still active for the national team.
Caps	Appearances
WC	Appearances at FIFA World Cups
EC	Appearances at UEFA European Football Championships
OG	Appearances at the Olympic Games
1st place, gold medalist(s)	Tournament winners
2nd place, silver medalist(s)	Tournament runners-up
3rd place, bronze medalist(s)	Tournament third place
Pos	Positions
GK	Goalkeeper
DF	Defender
MF	Midfielder
FW	Forward

== List of players ==
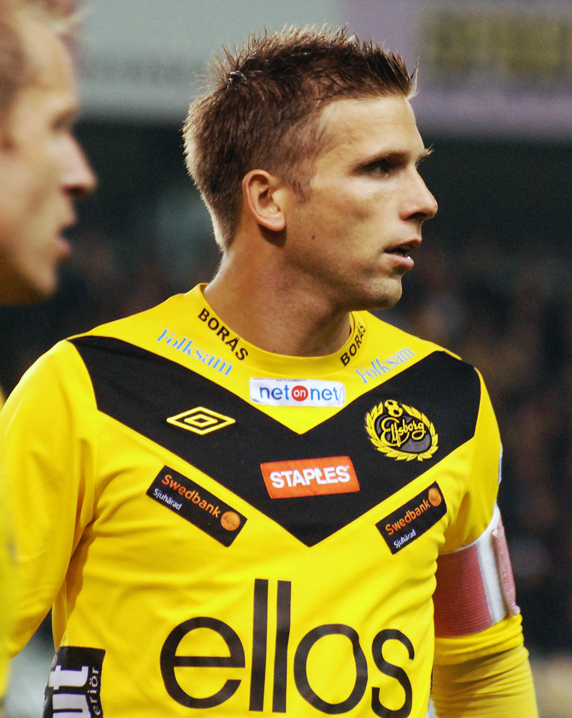
Anders Svensson, Sweden's most capped player of all time.

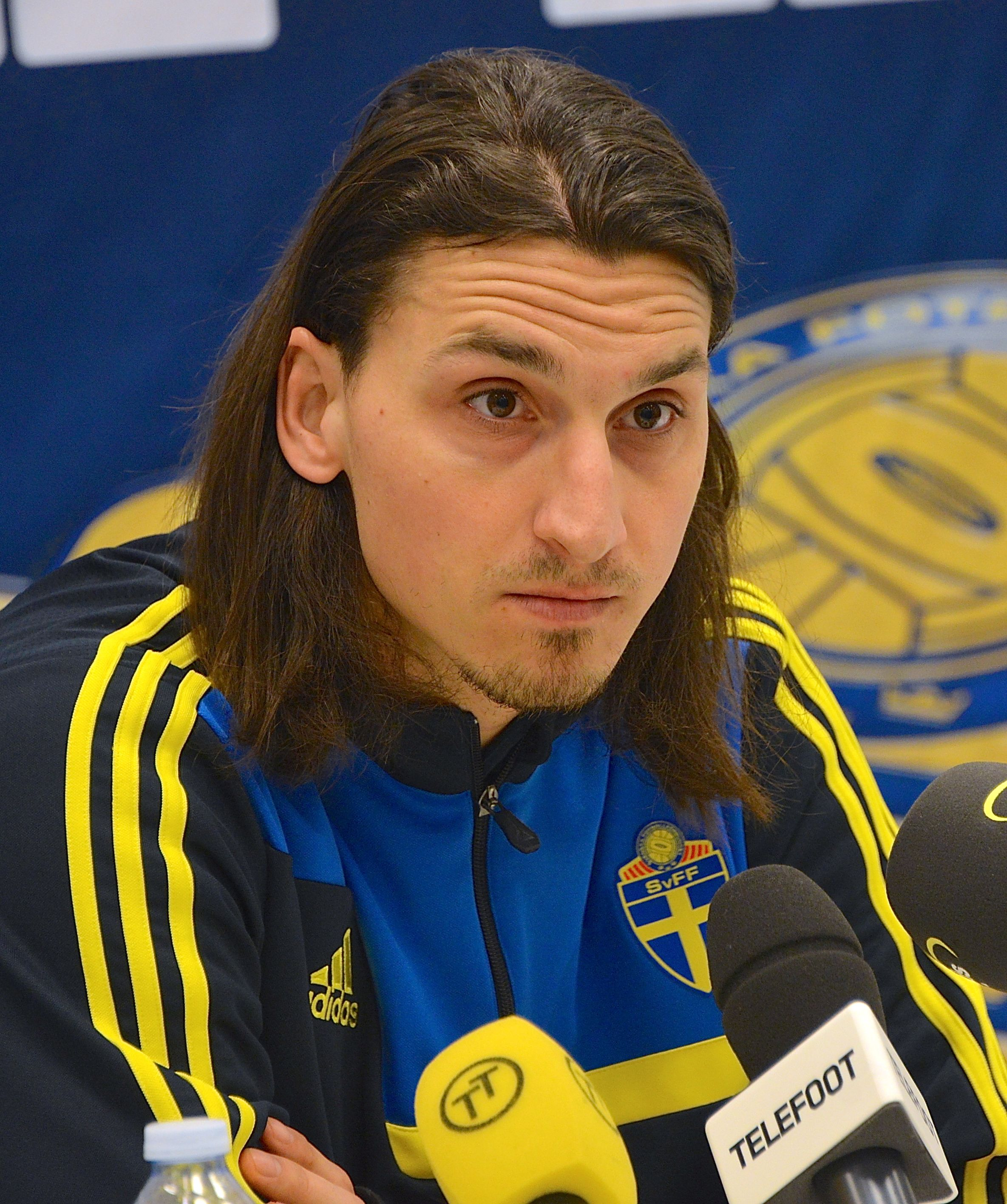
Zlatan Ibrahimović, Sweden's all-time top goalscorer.

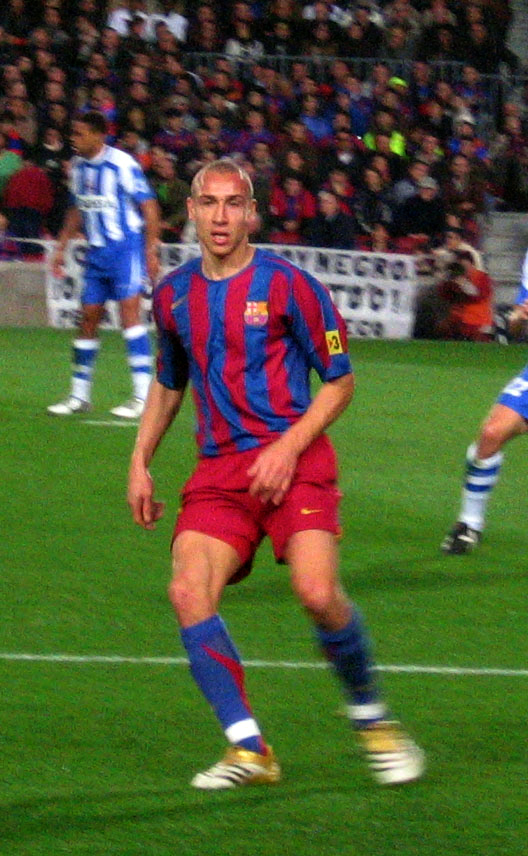
Henrik Larsson, one of the most prominent goalscorers in the Sweden men's national football team in the 1990s and 2000s.

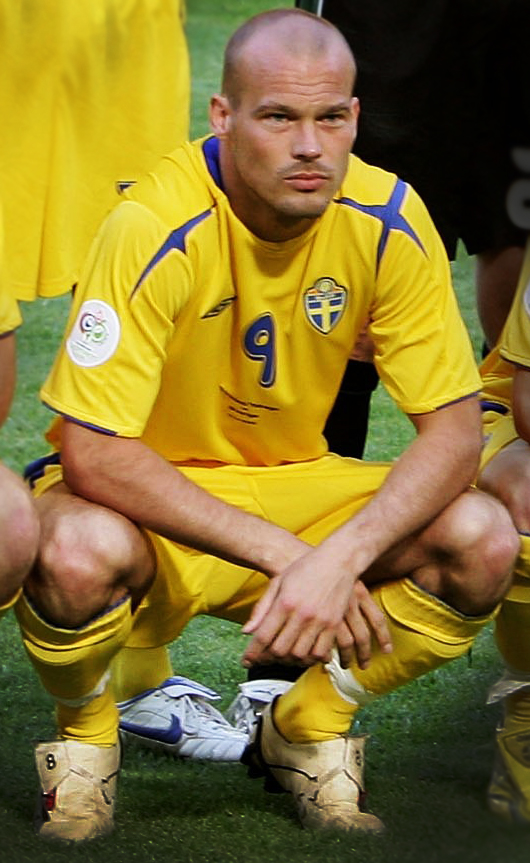
Freddie Ljungberg was one of the most important players of the national team, and also one of the top scoring midfielders of the team.

As of 17 November 2026.

Player	Pos	Caps	Goals	First	Last	WC	EC	OG
Anders Svensson	MF	148	21	1999	2013	2002, 2006	2004, 2008, 2012	
Thomas Ravelli	GK	143	0	1981	1997	1990, 1994 (bronze)	1992	
Andreas Isaksson	GK	133	0	2002	2016	2006	2004, 2008, 2012, 2016	
Sebastian Larsson	MF	133	10	2008	2021	2018	2008, 2012, 2016, 2020	
Kim Källström	MF	131	16	2001	2016	2006	2004, 2008, 2012, 2016	
Zlatan Ibrahimović	FW	122	62	2001	2023	2002, 2006	2004, 2008, 2012, 2016	
Olof Mellberg	DF	117	8	2000	2012	2002, 2006	2000, 2004, 2008, 2012	
Roland Nilsson	DF	116	1	1986	2000	1990, 1994 (bronze)	1992, 2000	
Björn Nordqvist	DF	115	0	1963	1978	1970, 1974, 1978		
Niclas Alexandersson	MF	109	7	1993	2008	2002, 2006	2000, 2008	
Henrik Larsson	FW	106	37	1993	2009	1994 (bronze) , 2002, 2006	2000, 2004, 2008	
Patrik Andersson	DF	96	3	1992	2002	1994 (bronze)	1992, 2000	
Orvar Bergmark	DF	94	0	1951	1965	1958 (silver)		
Mikael Lustig	DF	94	6	2008	2021	2018	2012, 2016, 2020	
Emil Forsberg	MF	92	21	2014	2025	2018	2016, 2020	
Marcus Berg	FW	90	24	2008	2021	2018	2016, 2020	
Andreas Granqvist	DF	88	9	2006	2019	2018	2012, 2016	
Victor Lindelöf	DF	86	3	2016	2026	2018, 2026	2016, 2020	
Teddy Lučić	DF	86	0	1995	2006	2002, 2006	2000, 2004	
Johan Elmander	FW	85	20	2002	2015	2006	2008, 2012	
Kennet Andersson	FW	83	31	1990	2000	1994 (bronze)	1992, 2000	
Robin Olsen	GK	79	0	2015	2025	2018	2016, 2020	
Christian Wilhelmsson	MF	79	9	2001	2012	2006	2004, 2008, 2012	
Joachim Björklund	DF	78	0	1992	2000	1994 (bronze)	1992, 2000	
Ronnie Hellström	GK	77	0	1968	1980	1970, 1974, 1978		
Tobias Linderoth	MF	76	2	1999	2008	2002, 2006	2004	
Freddie Ljungberg	MF	75	14	1998	2008	2002, 2006	2000, 2004, 2008	
Jonas Thern	MF	75	6	1987	1997	1990, 1994 (bronze)	1992	
Marcus Allbäck	FW	74	30	1999	2008	2002, 2006	2004, 2008	
Daniel Andersson	MF	74	0	1997	2009	2006	2000, 2008	
Håkan Mild	MF	74	8	1991	2001	1994 (bronze)	2000	
Viktor Claesson	MF	74	15	2012	2023	2018	2020	
Kalle Svensson	GK	73	0	1949	1958	1950 (bronze) , 1958 (silver)		1952 (bronze)
Albin Ekdal	MF	70	0	2011	2023	2018	2016, 2020	
Bo Larsson	MF	70	17	1964	1978	1970, 1974, 1978		
Ingemar Erlandsson	DF	69	2	1978	1985	1978		
Stefan Schwarz	MF	69	6	1990	2001	1990, 1994 (bronze)	1992	
Glenn Hysén	DF	68	7	1981	1990	1990		
Mikael Nilsson	DF	64	3	2002	2009		2004, 2008	
Alexander Isak	FW	64	19	2017	2026	2026	2020	
Ola Toivonen	FW	64	14	2007	2018	2018	2012	
Martin Dahlin	FW	60	29	1991	1997	1994 (bronze)	1992	
Roger Ljung	MF	59	3	1988	1995	1990, 1994 (bronze)	1992	
Stig Fredriksson	DF	58	2	1979	1987			
Magnus Hedman	GK	58	0	1997	2004	2002	2000	
Anders Limpar	MF	58	6	1987	1996	1990, 1994 (bronze)	1992	
Gunnar Gren	FW	57	32	1940	1958	1958 (silver)		1948 (gold)
Bengt Gustavsson	DF	57	0	1951	1963	1958 (silver)		1952 (bronze)
Klas Ingesson	MF	57	13	1989	1998	1990, 1994 (bronze)	1992	
Mattias Jonson	MF/FW	57	9	1996	2006	2002, 2006	2004	
Pontus Kåmark	DF	57	0	1990	2002	1994 (bronze)		
Erik Nilsson	DF	57	0	1938	1952	1938, 1950 (bronze)		1948 (gold) , 1952 (bronze)
Ludwig Augustinsson	DF	56	2	2015	2024	2018	2016, 2020	
Martin Olsson	DF	56	5	2010	2023	2018	2012, 2016	
Robert Prytz	MF	56	13	1980	1989			
Erik Edman	DF	55	1	2001	2009	2006	2004	
Roland Grip	DF	55	1	1968	1974	1970, 1974		
Åke Johansson	MF	53	1	1955	1965			
Robin Quaison	FW	52	14	2013	2023		2020	
Gösta Sandberg	FW	52	10	1951	1961			1952 (bronze)
Glenn Strömberg	MF	52	7	1982	1990	1990		
Emil Krafth	DF	52	0	2014	2025	2018	2020	
Agne Simonsson	FW	51	27	1957	1967	1958 (silver)		
Pontus Wernbloom	MF	51	2	2007	2016		2012	
Sigfrid Lindberg	GK	50	0	1921	1930			1924 (bronze)
Daniel Majstorović	DF	50	2	2003	2013			
Hasse Borg	DF	49	4	1976	1985	1978		
Jimmy Durmaz	MF	49	3	2011	2019	2018	2016	
Leif Eriksson	FW	49	12	1962	1972	1970		
Johan Mjällby	DF/MF	49	4	1997	2004	2002	2000	
Örjan Persson	MF	48	7	1962	1974	1970, 1974		
Tomas Brolin	FW	47	27	1990	1995	1990, 1994 (bronze)	1992	
Johnny Ekström	FW	47	13	1986	1995	1990	1992	
Dejan Kulusevski	MF/FW	47	5	2019	2026		2020	
Kristoffer Olsson	MF	47	0	2017	2023		2020	
Peter Larsson	MF	47	4	1983	1992	1990		
Ove Grahn	FW	45	10	1962	1976	1970, 1974		
Stefan Rehn	MF	45	6	1988	1995	1994 (bronze)		
Thomas Sjöberg	MF	45	14	1974	1981	1978		
Viktor Gyökeres	FW	43	27	2019	2026	2026		
Petter Hansson	DF	43	2	2001	2009	2006	2008	
Ove Kindvall	FW	43	16	1965	1974	1970, 1974		
Sven Rydell	FW	43	49	1923	1932			1924 (bronze)
Mattias Svanberg	MF	43	3	2019	2026	2026	2020	
Andreas Andersson	FW	42	8	1996	2003	2002		
Pierre Bengtsson	DF	42	0	2011	2022		2020	
Sven Jonasson	FW	42	20	1932	1940	1934, 1938		1936
Hans Selander	DF	42	3	1966	1977	1970		
Sven Friberg	MF	41	0	1915	1928			1924 (bronze)
Karl-Erik Grahn	MF	41	4	1935	1946			1936
Andreas Ravelli	DF	41	2	1980	1989			
Ralf Edström	FW	40	15	1972	1980	1974, 1978		
Anders Linderoth	MF	40	2	1972	1980	1978		
Gösta Löfgren	FW	40	12	1951	1961	1958 (silver)		1952 (bronze)
Tommy Svensson	MF	40	4	1967	1973	1970		
Conny Torstensson	MF	40	7	1972	1979	1974, 1978		
Sven Dahlkvist	DF/FW	39	4	1979	1985			
Rasmus Elm	MF	39	4	2009	2013		2012	
Kent Karlsson	DF	38	0	1973	1977	1974		
Krister Kristensson	DF	38	0	1967	1972	1970		
Magnus Erlingmark	DF/MF	37	1	1990	1998	1994 (bronze)	1992	
Putte Kock	MF	37	12	1919	1925			1924 (bronze)
Sigge Parling	MF	37	0	1954	1960	1958 (silver)		
Roland Sandberg	FW	37	15	1969	1976	1974		
Anthony Elanga	FW	36	8	2022	2026	2026		
Andreas Jakobsson	DF	36	2	1996	2004	2002	2004	
Lennart Samuelsson	DF	36	0	1950	1955	1950 (bronze)		1952 (bronze)
Staffan Tapper	MF	36	3	1971	1978	1974, 1978		
Lennart Wing	DF	36	0	1961	1965			
Sven Bergqvist	GK	35	0	1935	1943			
Arvid Emanuelsson	DF	35	1	1935	1946			1936
Jan Eriksson	DF	35	4	1990	1994		1992	
Knut Kroon	FW	35	18	1925	1934	1934		
Peter Nilsson	MF	35	0	1979	1984			
Ken Sema	DF/MF	35	5	2017	2026	2026	2020	
Ulf Eriksson	MF	34	3	1979	1988			
Tobias Hysén	FW	34	10	2005	2014			
Harry Nilsson	DF	34	0	1938	1947			
Olle Åhlund	MF	34	2	1943	1952			1952 (bronze)
Gabriel Gudmundsson	DF	33	0	2022	2026	2026		
Torbjörn Jonsson	MF	33	11	1955	1968			
Per Kaufeldt	FW	33	23	1921	1931			1924 (bronze)
Gunnar Nordahl	FW	33	43	1942	1948			1948 (gold)
Isaac Kiese Thelin	FW	33	5	2014	2024	2018		
Markus Rosenberg	FW	33	6	2005	2012		2008, 2012	
Ragnar Wicksell	MF	33	3	1911	1921			1912, 1920
Karl Gustafsson	FW	32	22	1908	1924			1908, 1912, 1920
Kurt Hamrin	FW	32	17	1953	1965	1958 (silver)		
Isak Hien	DF	32	0	2022	2026	2026		
Jesper Karlström	MF	32	0	2018	2026	2026		
Erik Persson	FW	32	20	1930	1939	1938		
Gustav Svensson	MF	32	0	2009	2021	2018	2020	
Magnus Svensson	MF	32	2	1996	2003	2002	2000	
Axel Alfredsson	DF	31	0	1924	1932			1924 (bronze)
Sven Axbom	DF	31	0	1955	1960	1958 (silver)		
Lennart Backman	MF	31	3	1958	1966			
Samuel Holmén	MF	31	2	2006	2013		2012	
Gösta Lindh	DF/MF	31	2	1950	1954			1952 (bronze)
Hans Mild	DF/MF	31	1	1960	1965			
Arne Nyberg	FW	31	18	1935	1946			
Stefan Pettersson	FW	31	4	1983	1993	1990		
Behrang Safari	DF	31	0	2008	2013			
Sven-Ove Svensson	MF	31	8	1951	1956			
Kurt Axelsson	DF	30	0	1966	1971	1970		
Jesper Blomqvist	MF	30	0	1994	2002	1994 (bronze)		
Mats Magnusson	FW	30	9	1984	1990	1990		
Bengt Nyholm	GK	30	0	1959	1964			
Gary Sundgren	DF	30	1	1994	2000		2000	
Rune Wenzel	MF	30	1	1919	1930			
Pär Zetterberg	MF	30	6	1993	1999			
