= List of IFK Norrköping players =

This list is about IFK Norrköping players with at least 100 league appearances. For a list of all IFK Norrköping players with a Wikipedia article, see Category:IFK Norrköping players. For the current IFK Norrköping first-team squad, see First-team squad.

This is a list of IFK Norrköping players with at least 100 league appearances.

== Players ==
Matches of current players as of 8 April 2015.

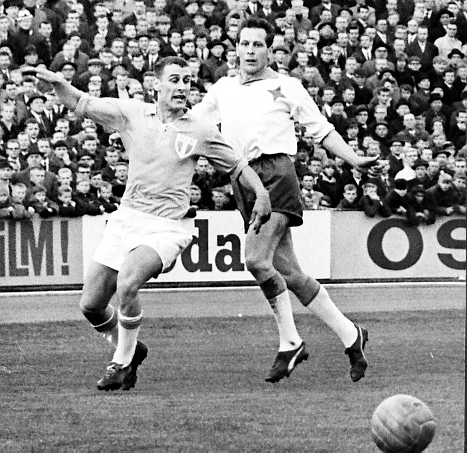
Åke Johansson (right) has made 305 league appearances for IFK Norrköping.

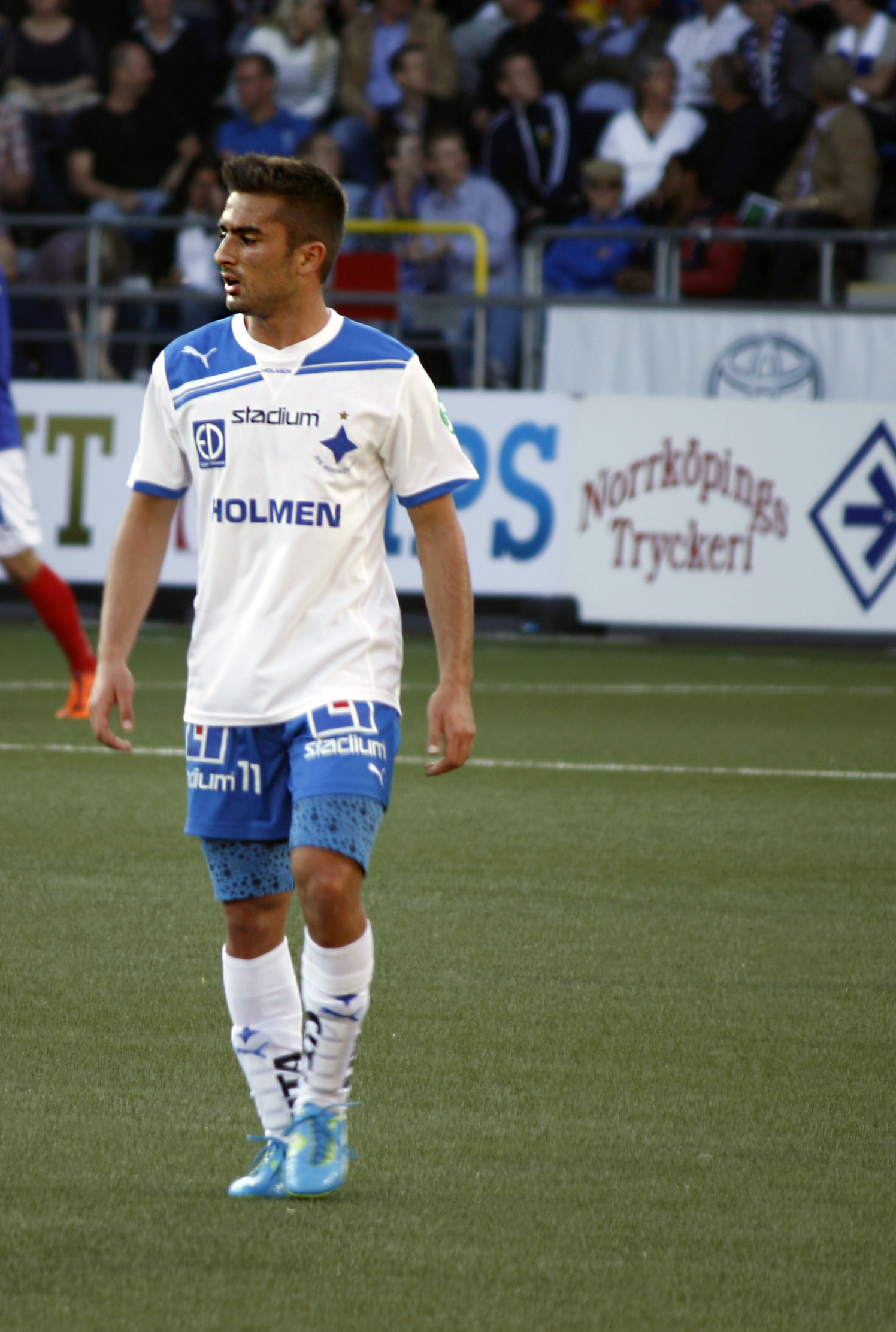
Christopher Telo has made 150 league appearances for IFK Norrköping.

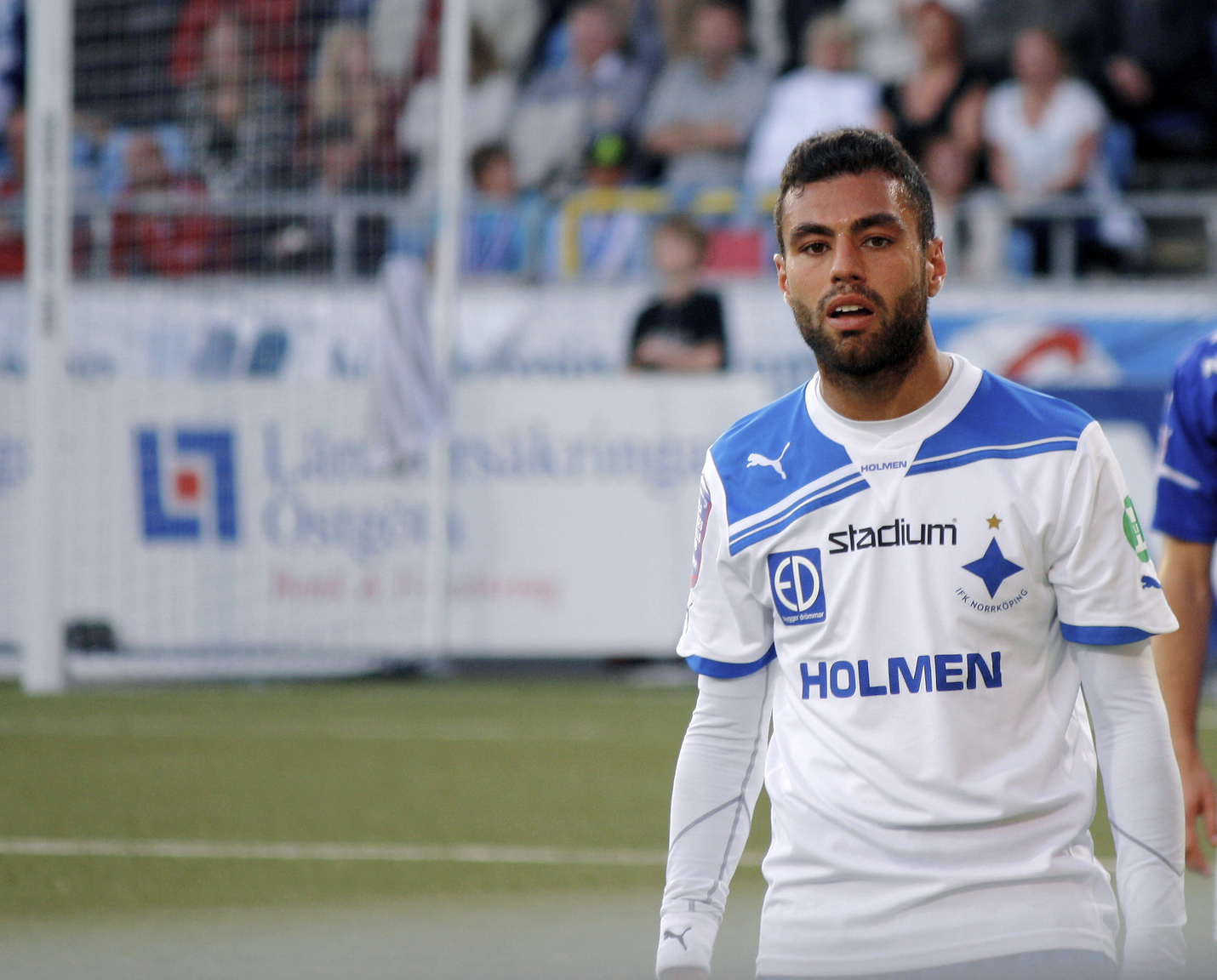
Imad Khalili has made 101 league appearances for IFK Norrköping.

Name	Nationality	Position	Norrköping career	League apps	League goals	Total apps	Total goals
Åke Johansson	Sweden	DF	1948–1966	305	1		
Jan Hellström	Sweden	FW	1981–1984; 1988–1994	265	116		
Björn Nordqvist	Sweden	DF	1961–1972	245	7		
Torbjörn Jonsson	Sweden	MF	1953–1960; 1967–1972	242	94		
Ove Kindvall	Sweden	FW	1962–1966; 1971–1975	178	100		
Harry Bild	Sweden	FW	1956–1964	175	120		
Christopher Telo	Sweden	MF	2007–	150	18		
Bengt Gustavsson	Sweden	DF	1947–1955	147	17		
Kristian Bergström	Sweden	MF	1998–2002	129	21		
Imad Khalili	Sweden	FW	2008–2013	101	29		
