= Gösta Sandberg =

Swedish sportsman

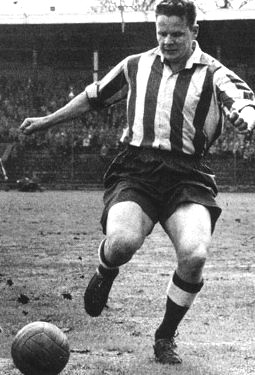
- Gösta Sandberg in 1964
- Born: Oskar Gösta Leonard Sandberg; 6 August 1932; Knivsta, Sweden
- Died: 27 April 2006 (aged 73); Stockholm, Sweden
Association football career
- Position: Striker
Youth career
- Knivsta IK
Senior career*
Years	Team	Apps	(Gls)
–1950	Knivsta IK		
1951–1966	Djurgårdens IF	322	(77)
International career
	Sweden B	2	(1)
1951–1961	Sweden	52	(10)
Managerial career
- 1959–1961: IF Brommapojkarna
- 1967–1971: Djurgårdens IF
- 1968: Djurgårdens IF (women)
- 1972–1978: IF Brommapojkarna
- 1979: Djurgårdens IF
- * Club domestic league appearances and goals
Ice hockey career
- Played for: Spånga IS; Djurgårdens IF
- National team: Sweden
- Playing career: 1957–1963

Oskar Gösta Leonard "Knivsta" Sandberg (6 August 1932 – 27 April 2006) was a Swedish football, ice hockey, and bandy player who is best remembered for representing Djurgårdens IF. He was capped 52 times for the national team in football, eight times in ice hockey, and three times in bandy.

In 1991, he was voted "Djurgårdare of the century".

== Football career ==
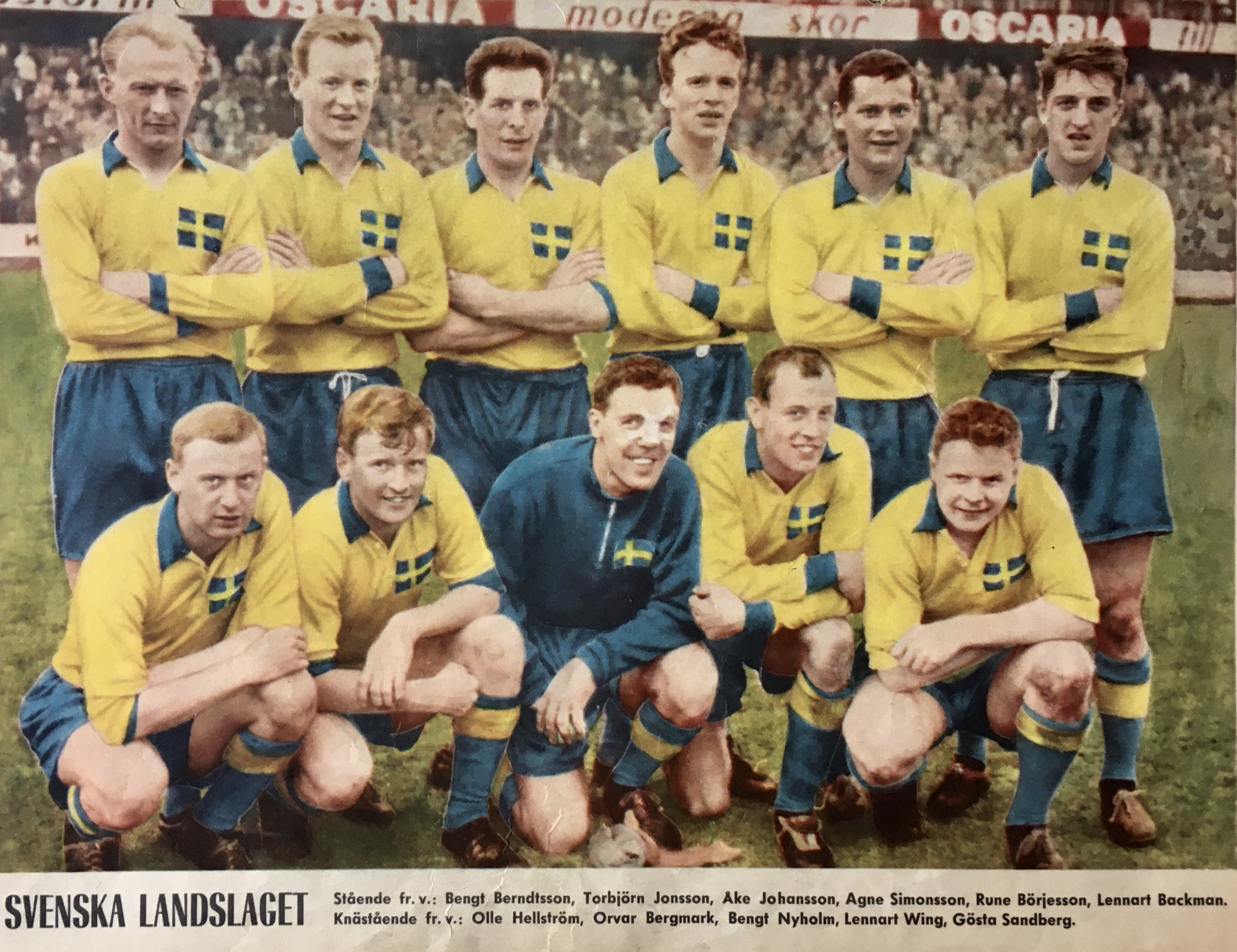
The Sweden men's national football team in 1961 with Sandberg in the front row, and from the left, standing: Bengt Berndtsson, Torbjörn Jonsson, Åke Johansson, Agne Simonsson, Rune Börjesson and Lennart Backman; crouched: Olle Hellström, Orvar Bergmark, Bengt Nyholm, Lennart Wing and Gösta Sandberg.

Gösta Sandberg joined Djurgården before the 1951–52 Allsvenskan season and stayed with the team throughout the rest of his career, until 1966, winning four Swedish titles. During his debut season in Allsvenskan, he played all 22 matches and six goals. Except for a one-year spell in second tier Division 1, Sandberg played all his Djurgården football in Allsvenskan, and there making 298 appearances and scoring 70 goals. As of 2023, he is the player who have scored the most goals in Allsvenskan for Djurgårdens IF.

A full international between 1951 and 1961, Sandberg won 52 caps and scored 10 goals for the Sweden national team and represented his country at the 1952 Summer Olympics where they won the bronze medal. He made his international debut in a friendly against Yugoslavia on 2 September 1951

In 1956, he received the Guldbollen as Sweden's best footballer of the year.

== Ice hockey career ==
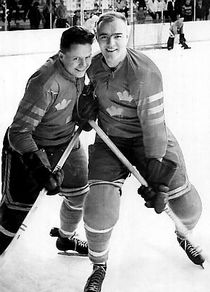
Sandberg (left) with Hans Mild at the 1961 World Ice Hockey Championships.

Sandberg first represented IK Sirius, then Spånga IS. Gösta Sandberg joined Djurgården from Spånga IS in 1957 and played with the team for six seasons in Division 1 until 1963, winning the Swedish title all six seasons.

Sandberg won eight caps for the Sweden national ice hockey team. Sandberg debuted for the national team on 23 November 1958 in a 8–2 win over Finland, where he was part of line together with fellow Djurgården player Hans Mild and Uno Öhrlund of Västerås IK. He represented Sweden at the 1961 World Ice Hockey Championships where Sweden finished fourth, as well as the 1961 Ice Hockey European Championships where Sweden finished third.

== Bandy career ==
Gösta Sandberg played with Djurgårdens IF bandy team in the 1961–66 seasons.

Sandberg represented the Sweden national bandy team a total of three times during his career.

== Managerial career ==
During and after his active career, Gösta Sandberg managed IF Brommapojkarna 1959-61 and 1972–78, and Djurgården 1967–71 and in 1979. Sandberg managed Djurgården's women's team in 1968.

== Personal life ==
Sandberg's nickname derives from the town he was born and grew up in, Knivsta. Sandberg died on his way home from the derby between the archrivals AIK and Djurgårdens IF on 27 April 2006.

Gösta Sandberg had four children and nine grandchildren. One son, Lars played Allsvenskan football for Djurgården, one daughter, Anna, represented IF Brommapojkarna, and two of his grandchildren, and Anna's children together with Brommapojkarna footballer and Swedish junior international Berndt Magnusson, Gustav Sandberg Magnusson and Anton Sandberg Magnusson, both played Allsvenskan football for IF Brommapojkarna.

== Honours ==
=== Ice hockey ===
Djurgårdens IF

- Swedish Champion: 1957–58, 1958–59, 1959–60, 1960–61, 1961–62, 1962–63

Sweden

- Ice Hockey European Championship bronze: 1961

=== Football ===
Djurgårdens IF

- Allsvenskan: 1954–55, 1959, 1964, 1966
- Division 2 Svealand: 1961

Sweden

- Summer Olympics bronze medal: 1952

Individual

- Guldbollen: 1956
