= Lennart Wing =

Swedish footballer and manager

Personal information
- Full name: Lennart Wing
- Date of birth: 7 August 1935 (age 91)
- Place of birth: Gothenburg, Sweden
- Height: 6 ft 1 in (1.85 m)
- Positions: Left half; center back

Youth career
- BK René
- Örgryte IS

Senior career*
Years	Team	Apps	(Gls)
1955–1964	Örgryte IS		
1965–1967	Dundee United	67	(9)
1967–1969	Örgryte IS		
1970	Kungsbacka BI		

International career
1961–65	Sweden	36	(0)

Managerial career
- 1976: Örgryte IS
- * Club domestic league appearances and goals

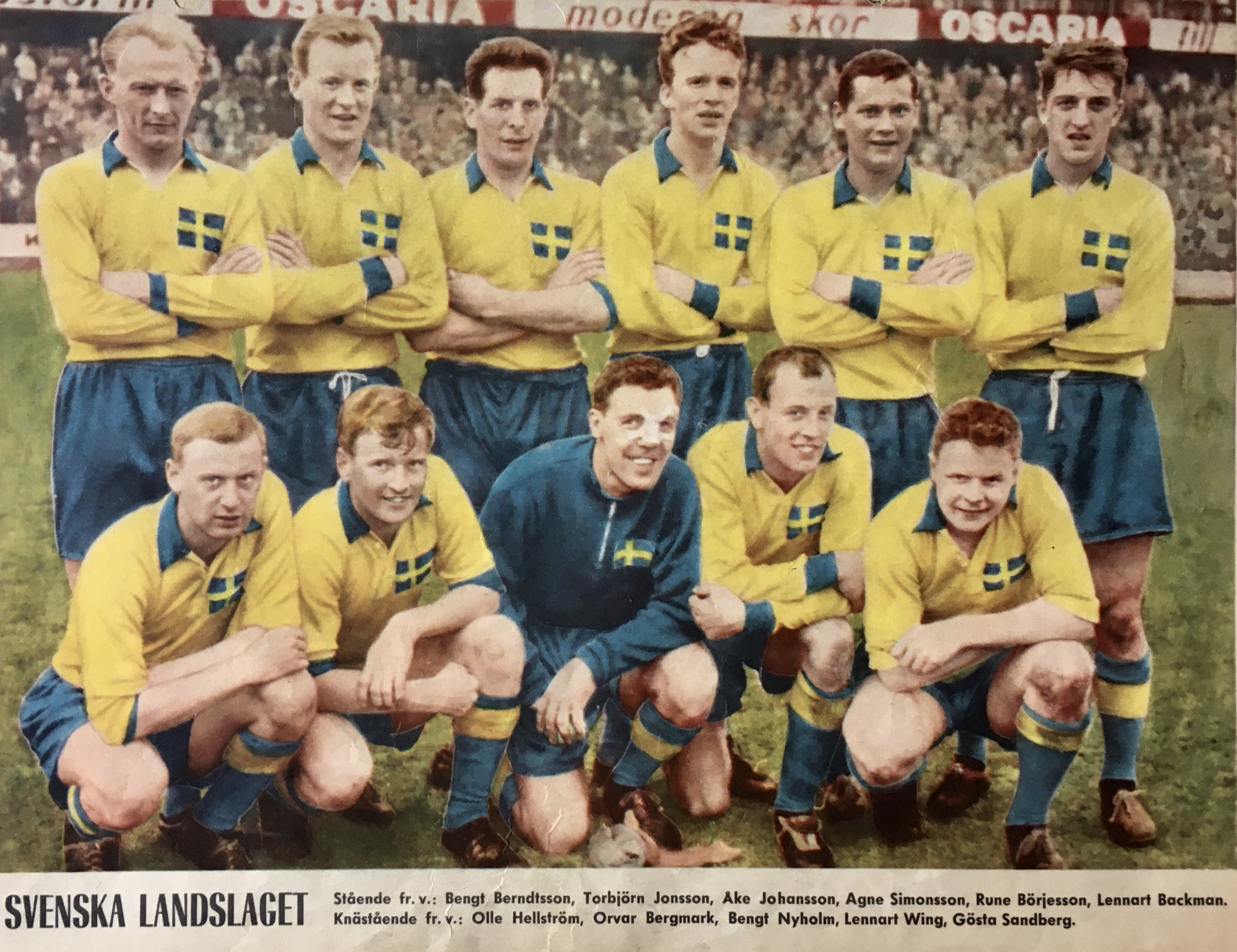
The Sweden men's national football team in 1961 with this players – from the left, standing: Bengt "Fölet" Berndtsson, Torbjörn Jonsson, Åke "Bajdoff" Johansson, Agne Simonsson, Rune Börjesson and Lennart Backman; crouched: Olle "Lappen" Hellström, Orvar Bergmark, Bengt "Zamora" Nyholm, Lennart Wing and Gösta "Knivsta" Sandberg.

Lennart Wing (born 7 August 1935) is a Swedish former footballer and manager who played as a wing half. He began his senior career with Örgryte IS before moving to play professionally in Scotland, joining Dundee United in 1965. He returned to Örgryte in 1967 and also played for Kungsbacka BI before retiring in 1970. He later managed Örgryte in 1976. He won 36 caps for Sweden between 1961 and 1965.

== Early life ==
Wing was born in Gothenburg, Sweden and grew up in the Gamlestaden area of the city. He was one of a group of friends who formed a local team, BK René, where he played until joining Örgryte as a youth player.

== Club career ==
Wing began his senior career at Örgryte in 1956. After promotion to the Allsvenskan in 1959, he helped the club achieve a third-placed finish in 1960, their highest placing during Wing's Örgryte career. At this time, Wing was employed as a firefighter whilst playing football part-time.

Wing signed for Scottish club Dundee United in January 1965, joining former Örgryte teammate Örjan Persson, who had made the same move the previous month. Wing's debut for the club was in a Scottish First Division match against St Mirren on 23 January 1965. He went on to be a regular in the left half position for United over the next two and a half seasons and was part of the team that eliminated holders Barcelona from the 1966–67 Fairs Cup.

Unable to further extend his leave of absence from his firefighting job, Wing returned to Sweden in April 1967 and rejoined Örgryte. He ended his career playing in the third tier of Swedish football with Kungsbacka, where he played as a forward and finished as the team's top scorer. He retired from playing in 1970.

== International career ==
Wing made his debut for Sweden in a friendly against Czechoslovakia in Prague on 26 March 1961. Later that year, he played as an emergency goalkeeper for part of a World Cup qualifying match against Switzerland, due to an injury to Bengt Nyholm.

Following their transfers to Scotland, Wing and Persson jointly became the first ever Dundee United players to appear in a full international match when they played for Sweden against Cyprus in May 1965. Wing's 36th and final appearance for Sweden was also against Cyprus, in November 1965.

== Management career ==
Wing was appointed Örgryte manager at short notice just before the start of the 1976 season following the abrupt departure of his predecessor Sid Huntley, but was unsuccessful in the role and resigned later the same year.

== After football ==
Wing lives in the Fiskebäck neighbourhood of Gothenburg following his retirement from the fire service. His contribution to Dundee United was recognised when he was inducted into the club's Hall of Fame in 2011.
