= Rune Börjesson =

Swedish footballer (1937–1996)

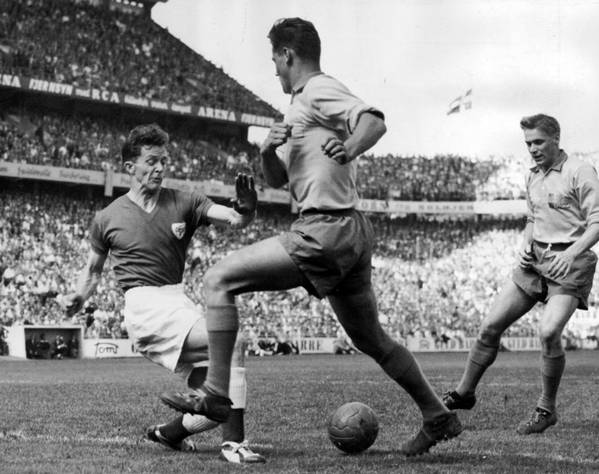
- Harry Bild and Börjesson in 1959

Personal information
- Full name: Rune Börjesson
- Date of birth: 5 April 1937
- Place of birth: Gothenburg, Sweden
- Date of death: 21 February 1996 (aged 58)
- Place of death: Gothenburg, Sweden
- Position: Forward

Youth career
- –1951: Hovås IF
- 1951–1954: Örgryte IS

Senior career*
Years	Team	Apps	(Gls)
1955–1961	Örgryte IS		
1961–1963	Juventus	0	(0)
1961–1963	→ Palermo (loan)	38	(10)
1963–1967	Örgryte IS		
1968–?	Hovås IF		

International career
1955–1957	Sweden U21	3	(0)
1955–1958	Sweden B	2	(2)
1958–1961	Sweden	20	(17)
- * Club domestic league appearances and goals

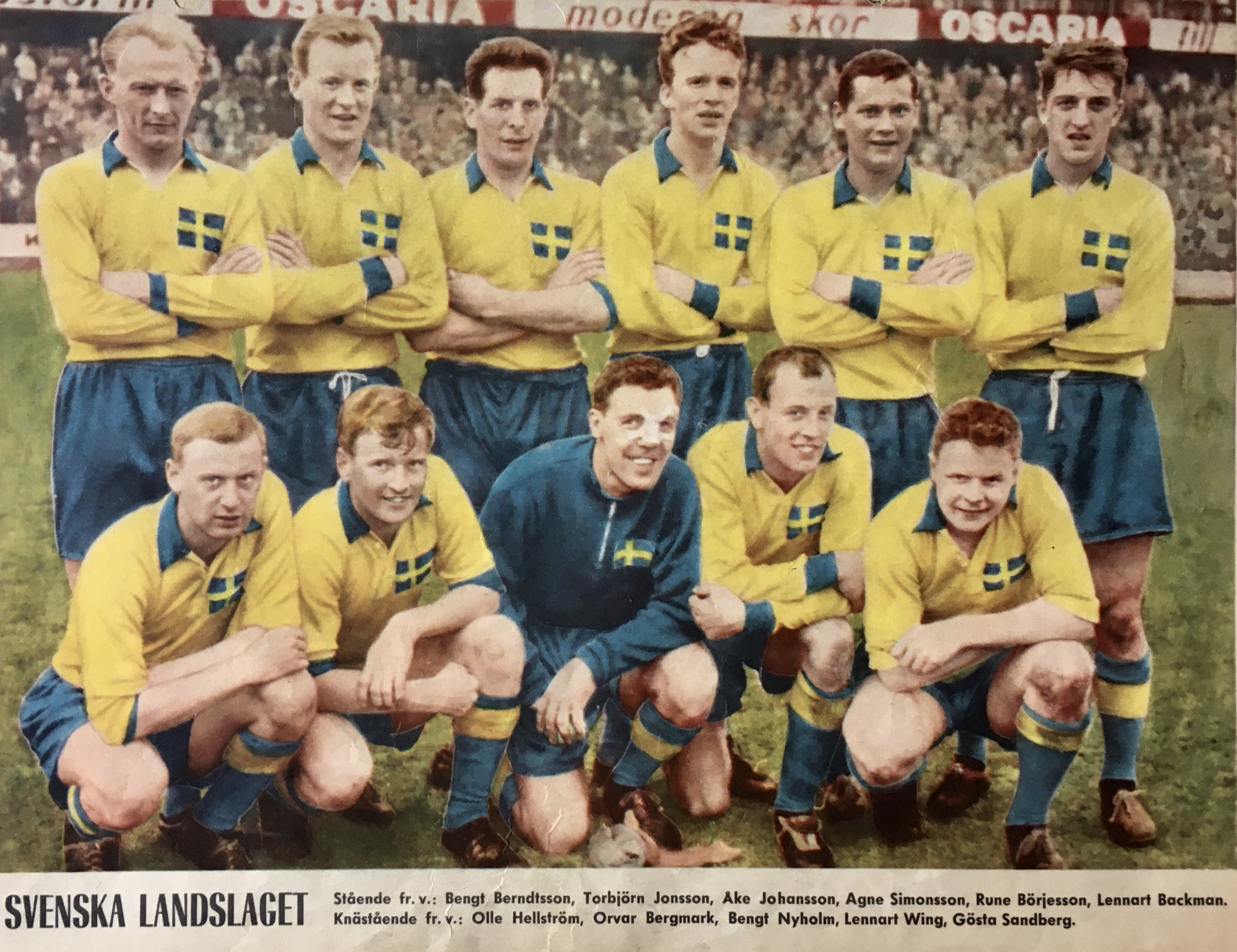
The Sweden men's national football team in 1961 with this players – from the left, standing: Bengt "Fölet" Berndtsson, Torbjörn Jonsson, Åke "Bajdoff" Johansson, Agne Simonsson, Rune Börjesson and Lennart Backman; crouched: Olle "Lill-Lappen" Hellström, Orvar Bergmark, Bengt "Zamora" Nyholm, Lennart Wing and Gösta "Knivsta" Sandberg.

Rune Börjesson (5 April 1937 – 21 February 1996) was a Swedish professional footballer who played as a forward. He was the Allsvenskan top scorer in 1959 and 1960 while at Örgryte IS, and later played professionally in Serie A with Juventus and Palermo. A full international between 1958 and 1961, he won 20 caps and scored 17 goals for the Sweden national team.

== Club career ==
=== Early career ===
Rune Börjesson started off his career with Hovås IF, before being signed by Örgryte IS at the age of 14. While at Örgryte, Börjesson formed a successful striker partnership with the prolific striker Agne Simonsson. In 1955, Börjesson was awarded GT's Kristallkulan as the best player in West Sweden.

During the 1957–58 Division 2 Västra Götaland season, Börjesson helped Örgryte win promotion to Allsvenskan for the first time in 19 years by scoring a total of 40 goals. In his first ever Allsvenskan season, Börjesson finished as the Allsvenskan top scorer with 21 goals, as Örgryte claimed a respectable fourth position in the 1959 table. The following season Börjesson yet again finished as the league's top scorer with 24 goals, helping his team finish third.

=== Serie A ===
Börjesson signed with the Italian Serie A team Juventus after the 1961 Allsvenskan season but was quickly loaned out to Palermo where he spent two seasons, playing in 38 games and scoring 10 goals.

=== Return to Örgryte ===
Börjesson returned to Örgryte in 1963 after his stint in Italy and was reunited with his former striker partner Agne Simonsson, who had returned from a spell in La Liga with Real Madrid and Real Sociedad. He left Örgryte at the end of the 1967 Allsvenskan season to round up his career with his boyhood club Hovås IF.

Börjesson scored a total of 91 goals in 125 Allsvenskan games during his two stints at Örgryte IS. In all divisions for Örgryte, he scored a total of 202 league goals, which puts him second behind Agne Simonsson for most league goals of all time for Örgryte.

== International career ==
Börjesson started his international career with the Sweden U21 team, representing them in three games. Prior to making his senior debut, he also represented the Sweden B team twice, scoring two goals.

Börjesson eventually made his international senior debut for Sweden in a home game against Norway on 14 September 1958, in which he also scored his first international goal. He played for Sweden in their unsuccessful 1962 FIFA World Cup qualifying campaign, but never appeared in a major tournament. He won a total of 20 caps for Sweden, scoring 17 goals.

== Career statistics ==
=== International ===
Appearances and goals by national team and year

National team	Year	Apps	Goals
Sweden	1958	2	2
Sweden	1959	6	5
Sweden	1960	6	6
Sweden	1961	6	4
Total		20	17

Scores and results list Sweden's goal tally first, score column indicates score after each Börjesson goal.

List of international goals scored by Rune Börjesson
No.	Date	Venue	Opponent	Score	Result	Competition	Ref.
1	14 September 1958	Ullevaal Stadium, Oslo, Norway	Norway	1–0	2–0	1956–59 Nordic Football Championship	
2	26 October 1958	Råsunda, Stockholm, Sweden	Denmark	2–1	4–4	1956–59 Nordic Football Championship	
3	2 August 1959	Malmö Stadium, Malmö, Sweden	Finland	2–1	3–1	1956–59 Nordic Football Championship	
4	18 October 1959	Gamla Ullevi, Gothenburg, Sweden	Norway	3–0	6–2	1956–59 Nordic Football Championship	
5	18 October 1959	Gamla Ullevi, Gothenburg, Sweden	Norway	4–0	6–2	1956–59 Nordic Football Championship	
6	18 October 1959	Gamla Ullevi, Gothenburg, Sweden	Norway	5–1	6–2	1956–59 Nordic Football Championship	
7	11 November 1959	Dalymount Park, Dublin, Ireland	Republic of Ireland	1–0	2–3	Friendly	
8	18 May 1960	Malmö Stadium, Malmö, Sweden	Republic of Ireland	4–1	4–1	Friendly	
9	22 June 1960	Helsinki Olympic Stadium, Helsinki, Finland	Finland	1–0	3–0	1960–63 Nordic Football Championship	
10	22 June 1960	Helsinki Olympic Stadium, Helsinki, Finland	Finland	2–0	3–0	1960–63 Nordic Football Championship	
11	18 September 1960	Ullevaal, Oslo, Norway	Norway	1–2	1–3	1960–63 Nordic Football Championship	
12	19 October 1960	Råsunda, Stockholm, Sweden	Belgium	1–0	2–0	1962 FIFA World Cup qualification	
13	23 October 1960	Ullevi, Gothenburg, Sweden	Denmark	1–0	2–0	1960–63 Nordic Football Championship	
14	28 May 1961	Råsunda, Stockholm, Sweden	Switzerland	2–0	4–0	1962 FIFA World Cup qualification	
15	28 May 1961	Råsunda, Stockholm, Sweden	Switzerland	4–0	4–0	1962 FIFA World Cup qualification	
16	18 June 1961	Parken, Copenhagen, Denmark	Denmark	1–0	2–1	1960–63 Nordic Football Championship	
17	18 June 1961	Parken, Copenhagen, Denmark	Denmark	2–0	2–1	1960–63 Nordic Football Championship	

== Honours ==
Örgryte IS

- Division 2 Västra Götaland: 1957–58

Individual

- Allsvenskan top scorer: 1959, 1960
- Kristallkulan: 1955
- Stor Grabb: 1960
