= Olle Hellström =

Swedish footballer (born 1936)

Personal information
- Date of birth: 1 January 1936 (age 90)
- Position: Defender

Senior career*
Years	Team	Apps	(Gls)
- Sandvikens AIK
- Djurgårdens IF

International career
	Sweden U23	10	(1)
	Sweden B	6	(0)
1960–1961	Sweden	6	(0)
- * Club domestic league appearances and goals

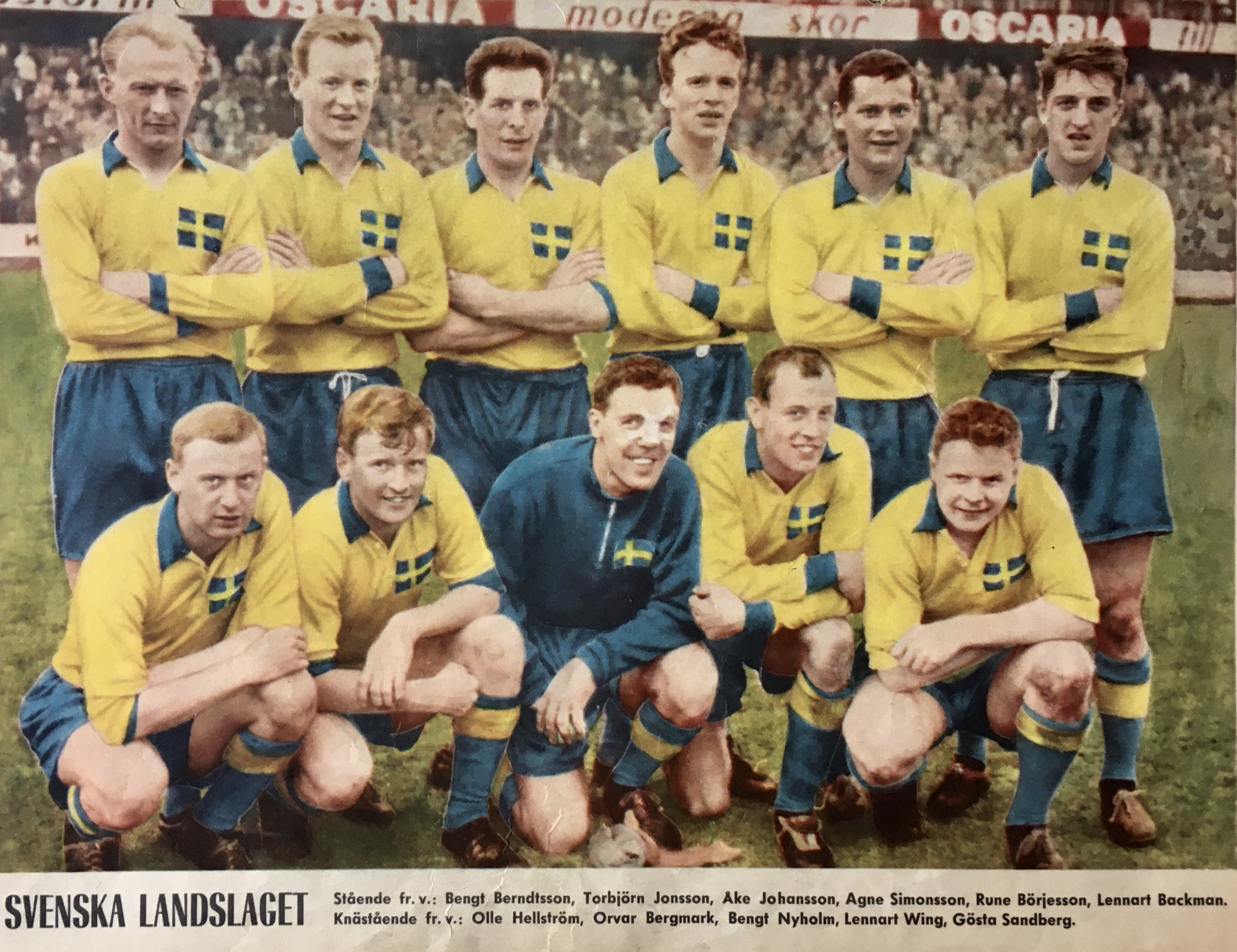
The Sweden men's national football team in 1961 with this players – from the left, standing: Bengt "Fölet" Berndtsson, Torbjörn Jonsson, Åke "Bajdoff" Johansson, Agne Simonsson, Rune Börjesson and Lennart Backman; crouched: Olle "Lappen" Hellström, Orvar Bergmark, Bengt "Zamora" Nyholm, Lennart Wing and Gösta "Knivsta" Sandberg.

Olle Hellström (born 1 January 1936) is a Swedish former footballer who played as a defender. He made 127 Allsvenskan appearances for Djurgårdens IF and scored four goals. He also played international games for Team Sweden.

== Honours ==
Djurgårdens IF

- Allsvenskan: 1959, 1964
