= Bengt Berndtsson =

Swedish footballer (1933–2015)

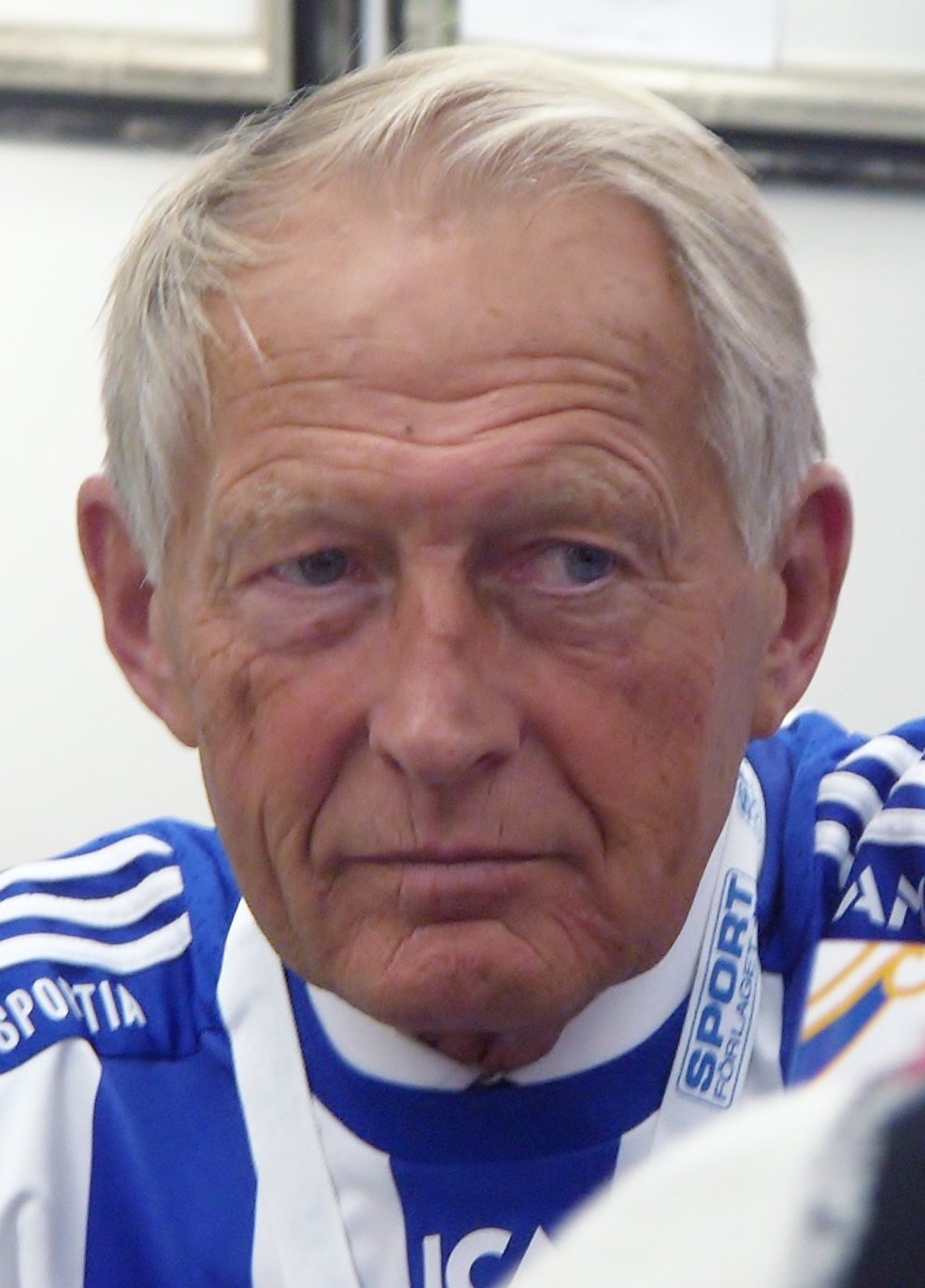
- Berndtsson during the Göteborg Book Fair in September 2009

Personal information
- Full name: Bengt Ryno Berndtsson
- Date of birth: 26 January 1933
- Place of birth: Gothenburg, Sweden
- Date of death: 4 June 2015 (aged 82)
- Place of death: Gothenburg, Sweden
- Position: Winger

Youth career
- Hisingstads IS
- Lundby IF

Senior career*
| Years | Team | Apps | (Gls) |
| 1951–1968 | IFK Göteborg | 348 | (69) |

International career
| 1956–1964 | Sweden | 29 | (6) |
Medal record
Men's Football
Representing Sweden
FIFA World Cup
| Runner-up | 1958 Sweden |
- * Club domestic league appearances and goals

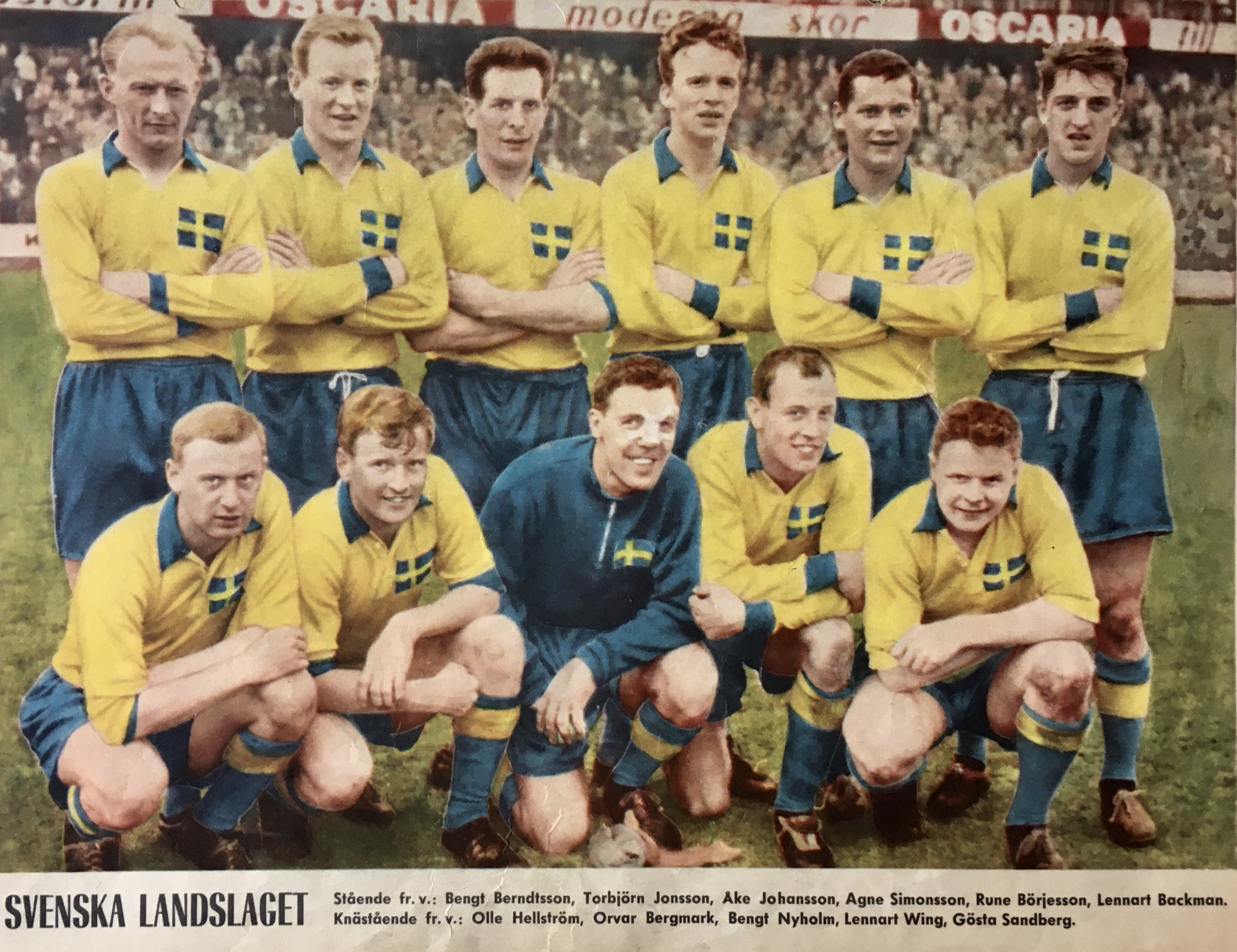
The Sweden men's national football team in 1961 with this players – from the left, standing: Bengt "Fölet" Berndtsson, Torbjörn Jonsson, Åke "Bajdoff" Johansson, Agne Simonsson, Rune Börjesson and Lennart Backman; crouched: Olle "Lappen" Hellström, Orvar Bergmark, Bengt "Zamora" Nyholm, Lennart Wing and Gösta "Knivsta" Sandberg.

Bengt Ryno Berndtsson (26 January 1933 – 4 June 2015) was a Swedish football winger. Born in Gothenburg, he was nicknamed Fölet (meaning The Foal).

After starting his career playing for two local clubs, he joined IFK Göteborg in 1951 and won a Swedish Championship with the club. He played 599 matches for IFK during his 17 seasons there, a club record that would stand for 30 years, before being beaten by Mikael Nilsson.

Berndtsson played for the Sweden men's national football team, and was a member of the squad at the 1958 FIFA World Cup finals.
