= Bengt Nyholm =

Swedish footballer

Bengt "Zamora" Nyholm
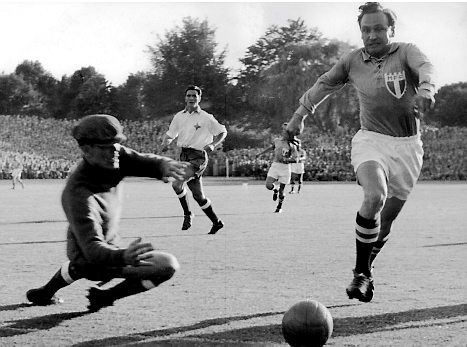
- Bengt Nyholm and Malmö FF's Henry Thillberg in 1955

Personal information
- Date of birth: 30 January 1930
- Place of birth: Härnösand, Sweden
- Date of death: 10 September 2015 (aged 85)
- Place of death: Mantorp, Sweden
- Position: Goalkeeper

Senior career*
Years	Team	Apps	(Gls)
–1948	IF Älgarna	?	(?)
1948–1965	IFK Norrköping	294	(0)

International career
1959–1964	Sweden	30	(0)
- * Club domestic league appearances and goals

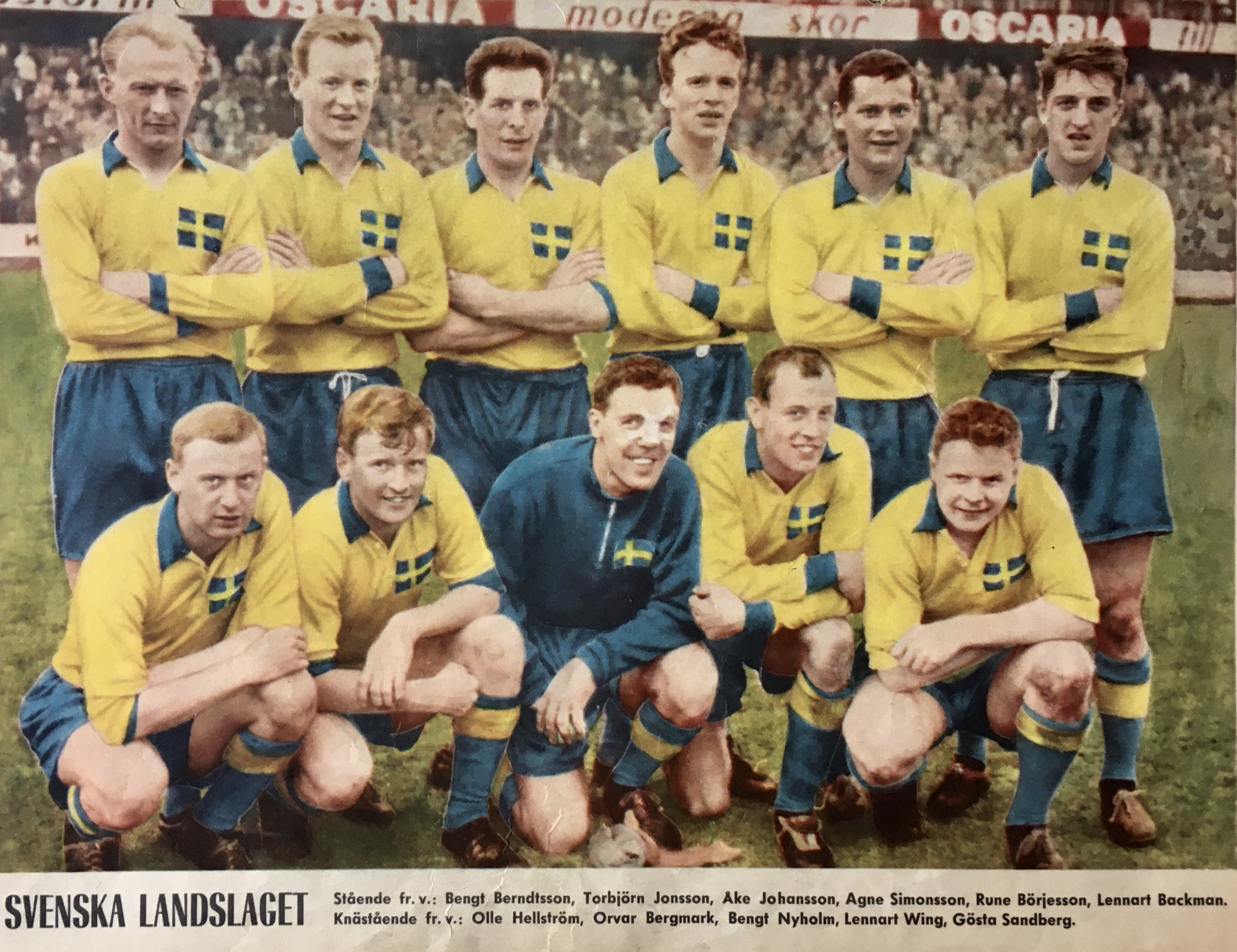
The Sweden men's national football team in 1961 with these players – from the left, standing: Bengt "Fölet" Berndtsson, Torbjörn Jonsson, Åke "Bajdoff" Johansson, Agne Simonsson, Rune Börjesson and Lennart Backman; crouched: Olle "Lappen" Hellström, Orvar Bergmark, Bengt "Zamora" Nyholm, Lennart Wing and Gösta "Knivsta" Sandberg.

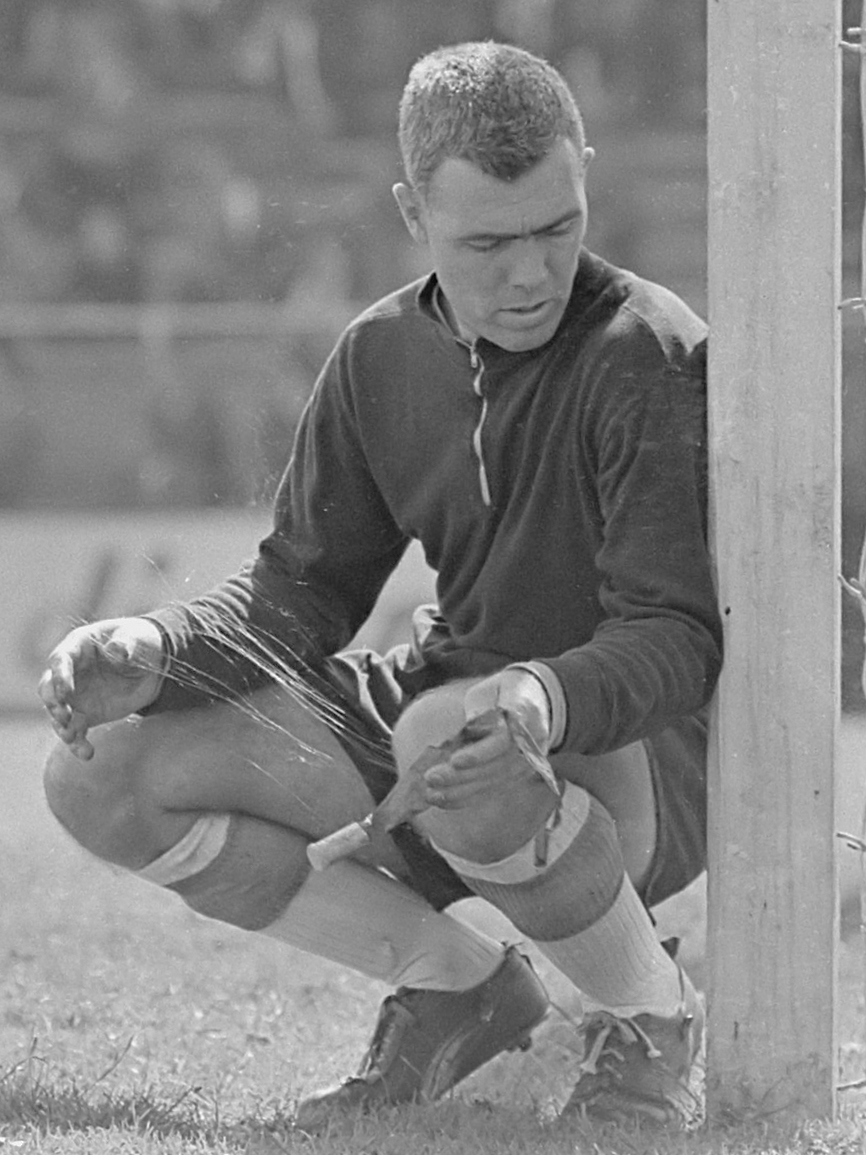
1963: Bengt Nyholm, the keeper of IFK Norrköping, tries to improve his effectiveness by applying glue from flypaper to his hands.

Bengt "Zamora" Nyholm (30 January 1930 – 10 September 2015) was a Swedish footballer who played as a goalkeeper. He was awarded the Guldbollen Award in 1961.

The nickname "Zamora" (after Ricardo Zamora) originated when he served as a ball boy as a child and would dive for the ball. Those around him remarked that he dove just like Zamora, and the name stuck.

== Honours ==
IFK Norrköping

- Allsvenskan: 1951–52, 1955–56, 1956–57, 1960, 1962, 1963

Individual

- Guldbollen: 1961
