= Orvar Bergmark =

Swedish footballer, manager, and bandy player

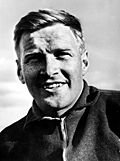
- Orvar Bergmark in 1958

Personal information
- Date of birth: 16 November 1930
- Place of birth: Bureå, Sweden
- Date of death: 10 May 2004 (aged 73)
- Place of death: Örebro, Sweden
- Height: 1.80 m (5 ft 11 in)
- Position: Right back

Youth career
- 1944–1947: Byske IF

Senior career*
Years	Team	Apps	(Gls)
1948–1954	Örebro SK	97	(10)
1955	AIK	17	(0)
1956–1962	Örebro SK	133	(8)
1962	AS Roma	2	(0)
1962–1965	Örebro SK	44	(1)
Total		293	(19)

International career
1951–1965	Sweden	94	(0)

Managerial career
- 1958–1961: Örebro SK
- 1966–1970: Sweden
- 1971–1973: Örebro SK
- 1974–1977: Fjugesta IF
- 1978: Örebro SK
Medal record
Representing Sweden
Men's football
FIFA World Cup
Runner-up	1958 Sweden	Team
Men's bandy
Olympic Games (demonstration sport)
Gold medal – first place	1952 Oslo	Team
- * Club domestic league appearances and goals

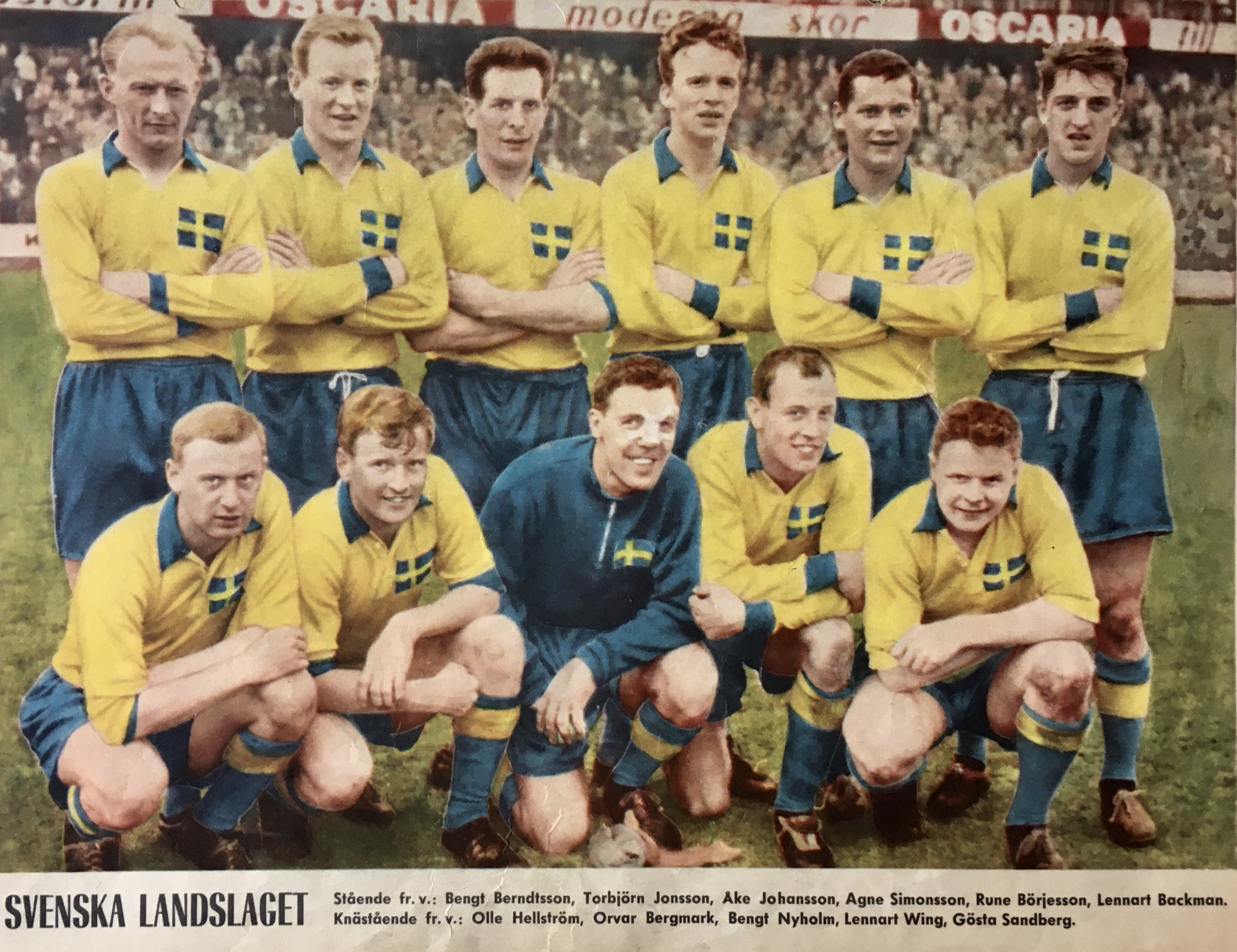
The Sweden men's national football team in 1961 with the players from the left, standing: Bengt "Fölet" Berndtsson, Torbjörn Jonsson, Åke "Bajdoff" Johansson, Agne Simonsson, Rune Börjesson and Lennart Backman; crouched: Olle "Lappen" Hellström, Orvar Bergmark, Bengt "Zamora" Nyholm, Lennart Wing and Gösta "Knivsta" Sandberg.

Orvar Bergmark (16 November 1930 – 10 May 2004) was a Swedish football defender, manager and bandy player. He was the second manager of the Sweden national team, and was manager when the Sweden national team qualified for the FIFA World Cup in Mexico 1970, after having beaten France (among others) in the qualifications. The 1970 World Cup was the first one for Sweden in 12 years, and it was also the first time in 20 years that Sweden had qualified for a World Cup. Sweden hosted the 1958 FIFA World Cup, and hence did not need to qualify. (Bergmark was a player for Sweden that year.) Sweden did not qualify for the World Cups in 1954, 1962 and 1966]. In 1952 he took part in the Olympic Bandy tournament.

In Mexico, Sweden had to face the becoming runners-up, Italy, in their first game, and lost 0–1. The Italian squad included Roberto Boninsegna, Gianni Rivera, Luigi Riva, Giacinto Facchetti and Dino Zoff. In the second game, Israel did not seem too difficult to beat. But Sweden managed only a 1–1 draw. Then Sweden needed to beat Uruguay in the last group game by at least two goals. Orvar Bergmark's squad only scored a single goal (in the last minute), and it all was over. Some of Orvar Bergmark's key players were Ove Grahn, Ove Kindvall, Hasse Selander, Tommy Svensson (who would 24 years later, as manager, lead Sweden to a surprising bronze medal in the 1994 World Cup in the United States), Bosse Larsson and Roland Grip.

During the tournament, Sweden had a goal-keeping problem. Bergmark used the young Ronnie Hellström in the opening game against Italy, and was displeased with Hellström's performance when Italy scored. The little less talented, but far more experienced Sven-Gunnar Larsson guarded the Swedish goal during the last two matches instead.

Orvar Bergmark left his office soon after the World Cup and was replaced by Georg "Åby" Ericson.

Bergmark won a silver medal and was elected to the All-Star team at the 1958 FIFA World Cup. He was also an international bandy player, and won silver medals at that sport's World Cup also. He played his bandy for Örebro SK.

In 1980, he organized the first international tournament for women's bandy. In Örebro, Sweden met Finland, Norway and the Netherlands, and took the first prize.

Bergmark contracted Parkinson's disease around 1980, and died from it in 2004.

== Honours ==
=== Player ===
Sweden

- FIFA World Cup: runner-up 1958

Individual

- Guldbollen: 1958
- World Soccer World XI: 1960, 1961
- All-Star team as a defender at the 1958 World Cup
