= 1959 Allsvenskan =

35th season of Allsvenskan

Allsvenskan
- Season: 1959
- Champions: Djurgårdens IF
- Relegated: Halmstads BK; GAIS
- European Cup: IFK Göteborg
- Top goalscorer: Rune Börjesson, Örgryte IS (21)
- Average attendance: 13,369

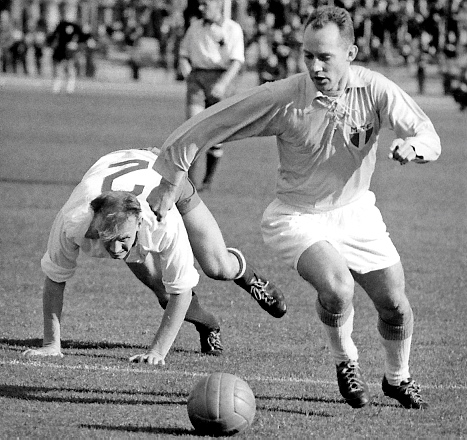
Malmö FF-IFK Norrköping

These are the statistics for the 1959 season of Allsvenskan, the top tier of the Swedish football league system.

== Overview ==
The league was contested by 12 teams, with Djurgårdens IF winning the championship.

== League table ==
Pos	Team	Pld	W	D	L	GF	GA	GD	Pts	Qualification or relegation
1	Djurgårdens IF (C)	22	11	10	1	46	20	+26	32	
2	IFK Norrköping	22	14	3	5	58	30	+28	31	
3	IFK Göteborg	22	14	3	5	56	28	+28	31	Qualification to European Cup preliminary round (Note: IFK Göteborg qualified for the European Cup as Allsvenskan leaders in the spring of 1959.)
4	Örgryte IS	22	13	4	5	53	38	+15	30	
5	Malmö FF	22	12	4	6	50	29	+21	28	
6	Hammarby IF	22	9	1	12	38	56	−18	19	
7	Sandvikens IF	22	7	5	10	35	54	−19	19	
8	Hälsingborgs IF	22	7	4	11	44	45	−1	18	
9	IFK Malmö	22	8	2	12	34	48	−14	18	
10	AIK	22	6	5	11	37	46	−9	17	
11	Halmstads BK (R)	22	7	2	13	38	46	−8	16	Relegation to Division 2
12	GAIS (R)	22	2	1	19	20	69	−49	5	Relegation to Division 2

Rules for classification: 1) points; 2) goal difference; 3) number of goals scored.
(C) Champions; (R) Relegated

== Results ==
Home \ Away	AIK	DIF	GAIS	HBK	HAIF	HÄIF	IFKG	IFKM	IFKN	MFF	SIF	ÖIS
AIK		1–1	6–1	3–1	2–3	1–2	1–1	1–0	0–0	1–3	2–0	2–4
Djurgårdens IF	4–2		6–0	3–0	1–0	1–1	1–1	7–1	2–1	0–0	2–2	2–2
GAIS	1–2	1–1		0–2	1–0	2–6	0–5	0–1	1–2	1–2	0–2	2–4
Halmstads BK	4–2	0–1	7–0		0–2	2–4	1–1	5–1	2–4	0–2	1–1	3–1
Hammarby IF	3–2	0–2	2–1	4–2		3–2	4–2	2–6	3–2	1–6	3–2	1–3
Hälsingborgs IF	2–3	1–1	1–2	0–3	2–1		0–2	1–2	4–1	2–3	2–0	4–3
IFK Göteborg	4–0	0–2	3–2	3–0	3–2	1–0		5–0	1–3	3–1	7–0	0–3
IFK Malmö	2–1	3–5	3–0	1–0	4–0	1–1	1–3		2–1	1–2	3–4	0–1
IFK Norrköping	5–2	1–1	3–1	3–0	5–1	5–3	2–3	3–0		3–0	2–1	4–1
Malmö FF	0–0	0–1	5–1	4–2	4–1	1–1	2–3	3–0	1–4		6–0	3–3
Sandvikens IF	2–2	2–1	3–2	0–1	0–0	5–4	2–5	3–2	1–1	1–0		3–5
Örgryte IS	3–1	1–1	3–1	6–2	4–2	2–1	1–0	0–0	0–3	0–2	3–1	

Legend: Blue = home team win; Yellow = draw; Red = away team win.

== Attendances ==
#	Football club	Average attendance
1	Örgryte IS	25,490
2	Djurgårdens IF	22,787
3	IFK Göteborg	20,602
4	Hammarby IF	14,560
5	AIK	13,731
6	Malmö FF	13,612
7	IFK Norrköping	10,646
8	Hälsingborgs IF	10,050
9	IFK Malmö	9,361
10	GAIS	8,881
11	Sandvikens IF	8,434
12	Halmstads BK	6,997
