= Sven-Ove Svensson =

Swedish football player

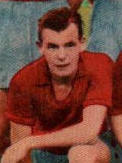
- Sven-Ove Svensson playing for Helsingborgs IF against Halmstads BK at Olympia in July 1944.

Personal information
- Date of birth: 9 June 1922
- Date of death: 21 December 1986 (aged 65)
- Position: Midfielder

Senior career*
Years	Team	Apps	(Gls)
1947–1958	Helsingborgs IF		

International career
1951–1956	Sweden	31	(8)
- * Club domestic league appearances and goals

Sven-Ove Svensson (9 June 1922 – 21 December 1986) was a Swedish footballer who played as a midfielder for Helsingborgs IF and the Sweden national team.

== Career ==
Svensson played most of his career in Helsingborgs IF in Allsvenskan. Having made his debut in the Sweden national team in 1951 he was capped 31 times scoring 8 goals. He was bestowed guldbollen in 1954. In 1956 he was injured which ended his career.
