= Lennart Backman =

Swedish sportsperson (1934–2026)

Personal information
- Full name: Kurt Lennart Ingemar Backman
- Date of birth: 7 February 1934
- Place of birth: Skellefteå, Sweden
- Date of death: 24 January 2026 (aged 91)
- Position: Winger

Youth career
- Skellefteå IF

Senior career*
Years	Team	Apps	(Gls)
1950–1956	Skellefteå IF		
1957–1958	IFK Norrköping	32	(6)
1959–1968	AIK	194	(51)

International career
1958–1965	Sweden B	2	(0)
1958–1966	Sweden	31	(3)
- * Club domestic league appearances and goals

Kurt Lennart Ingemar Backman (7 February 1934 – 24 January 2026) was a Swedish footballer who played as a winger. He made more than 200 Allsvenskan appearances for IFK Norrköping and AIK between 1957 and 1968. A full international between 1958 and 1966, he won 31 caps and scored three goals for the Sweden national team.

== Club career ==
Born in Skellefteå, Backman started off his career with Skellefteå IF. In 1957, he signed for the Allsvenskan team IFK Norrköping where he played for two seasons. In 1959, he signed with AIK with which he spent ten seasons, appearing in a total of 194 league games. Nine of these seasons were spent in Allsvenskan, while he spent the 1962 season with AIK in Division 2 Svealand. In Division 2, Backman scored a total of 19 goals in 24 games, helping AIK win Division 2 Svealand and win promotion back to Allsvenskan by qualifying through the 1962 Allsvenskan promotion playoffs. He retired from professional football in 1968.

== International career ==
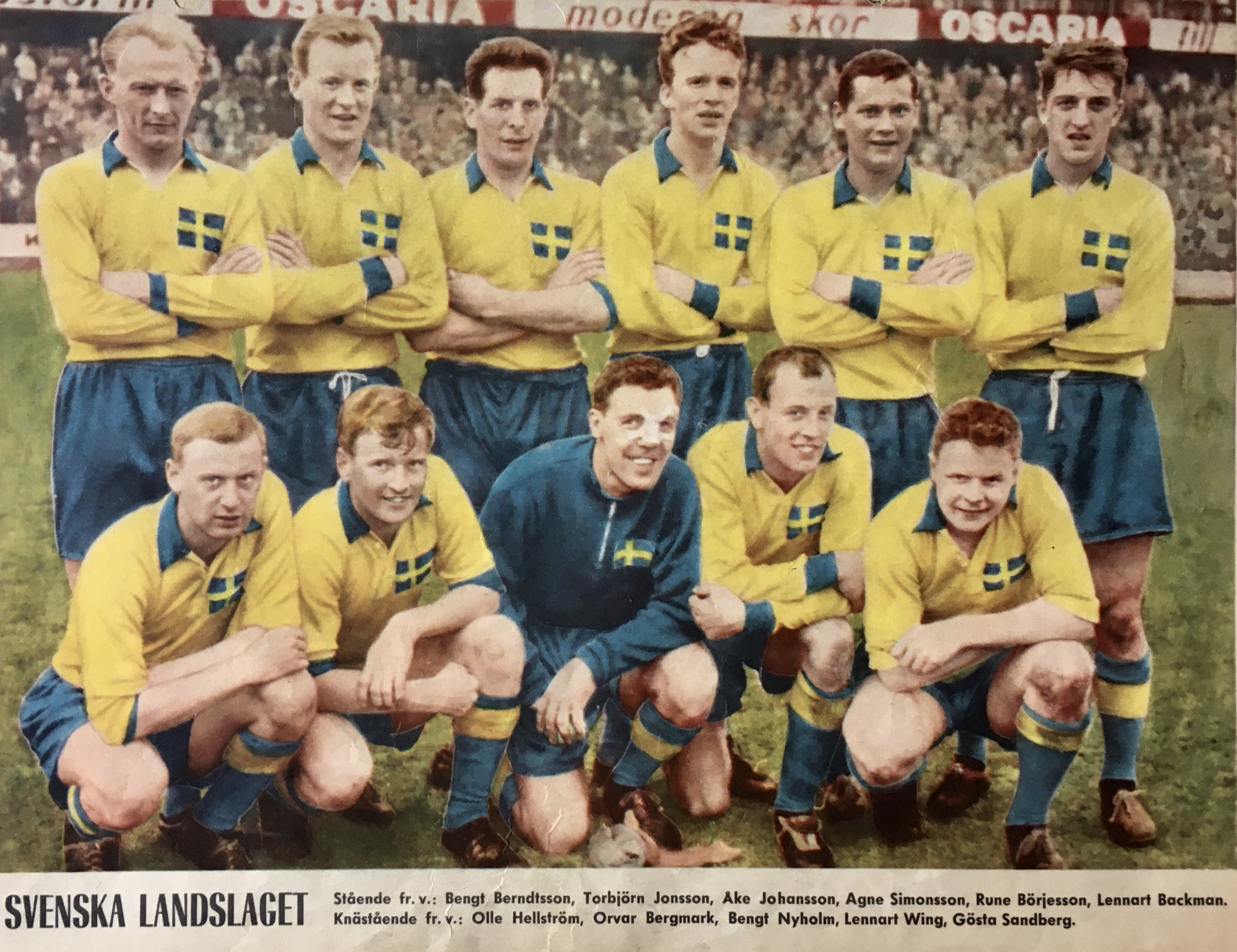
The Sweden men's national football team in 1961 with this players – from the left, standing: Bengt "Fölet" Berndtsson, Torbjörn Jonsson, Åke "Bajdoff" Johansson, Agne Simonsson, Rune Börjesson and Lennart Backman; crouched: Olle "Lill-Lappen" Hellström, Orvar Bergmark, Bengt "Zamora" Nyholm, Lennart Wing and Gösta "Knivsta" Sandberg.

Backman made his full international debut for the Sweden national team on 7 May 1958 in a friendly game against Switzerland ahead of the 1958 FIFA World Cup. 65 minutes into his debut, Backman was replaced by Sylvie Bengtsson after picking up a knee injury. The injury ended up keeping Backman out of Sweden's 1958 World Cup squad and sidelined him from all football for the next couple of months.

Backman scored his first international goal for Sweden in a 6–0 friendly win against Denmark on 21 June 1959. He made his competitive debut for Sweden on 19 October 1960 in a 1962 FIFA World Cup qualifier against Belgium which Sweden won 2–0. He also represented Sweden in the UEFA Euro 1964 and 1966 FIFA World Cup qualifying campaigns, but never appeared in a major international tournament. He made his final international appearance on 4 June 1966 in a friendly against Finland.

In total, Backman won 31 caps for Sweden and scored three goals. He also appeared twice for the Sweden B team.

== Bandy and ice hockey career ==
A versatile athlete, Backman also represented AIK in bandy and ice hockey during his footballing career. He appeared a total of 16 times for the Sweden national bandy team, and helped his country finish second at the 1961 Bandy World Championship and third at the 1963 Bandy World Championship.

== Death ==
Backman died on 24 January 2026, at the age of 91.

== Career statistics ==
Appearances and goals by national team and year
National team	Year	Apps	Goals
Sweden	1958	2	0
Sweden	1959	4	2
Sweden	1960	5	0
Sweden	1961	8	1
Sweden	1962	3	0
Sweden	1963	6	0
Sweden	1964	1	0
Sweden	1965	1	0
Sweden	1966	1	0
Total		31	3

Scores and results list Sweden's goal tally first, score column indicates score after each Backman goal.

List of international goals scored by Lennart Backman
No.	Date	Venue	Opponent	Score	Result	Competition	Ref.
1	21 June 1959	Parken, Copenhagen, Denmark	Denmark	4–0	6–0	1956–59 Nordic Football Championship	
2	28 June 1959	Népstadion, Budapest, Hungary	Hungary	2–3	2–3	Friendly	
3	9 August 1961	Idrottsparken, Norrköping, Sweden	Finland	4–0	4–0	1960–63 Nordic Football Championship	

== Honours ==
AIK

- Division 2 Svealand: 1962

Individual

- Stor Grabb: 1960
