= Agne Simonsson =

Swedish footballer (1935–2020)

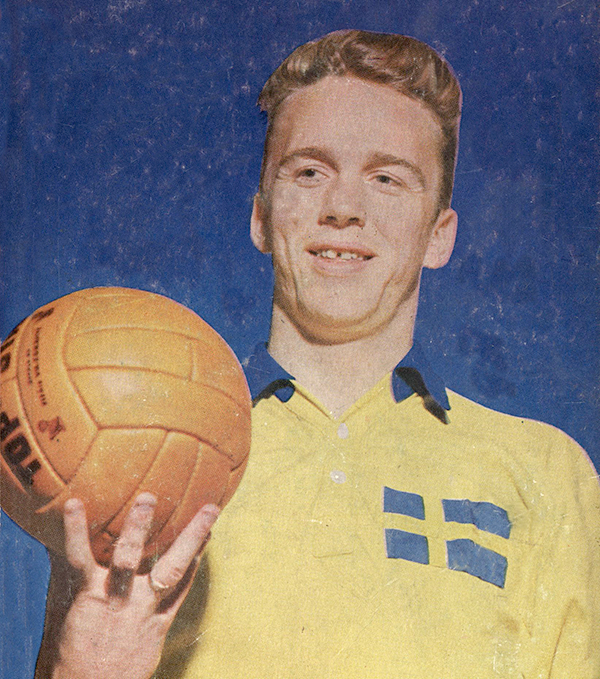
- Simonsson with Sweden in 1960s

Personal information
- Full name: Tore Klas Agne Simonsson
- Date of birth: 19 October 1935
- Place of birth: Gothenburg, Sweden
- Date of death: 22 September 2020 (aged 84)
- Place of death: Göteborg, Sweden
- Position: Forward

Youth career
- BK René

Senior career*
Years	Team	Apps	(Gls)
1953–1960	Örgryte IS	42	(25)
1960–1963	Real Madrid	3	(1)
1961–1962	→ Real Sociedad (loan)	22	(8)
1963–1970	Örgryte IS	120	(80)
Total		187	(114)

International career
1957	Sweden U21	1	(3)
1957–1967	Sweden	51	(27)

Managerial career
- 1971–1972: Örgryte IS
- 1977–1982: BK Häcken
- 1983–1986: Örgryte IS
- 1988–1990: Iraklis
Medal record
Men's Football
Representing Sweden
FIFA World Cup
Runner-up	1958 Sweden
- * Club domestic league appearances and goals

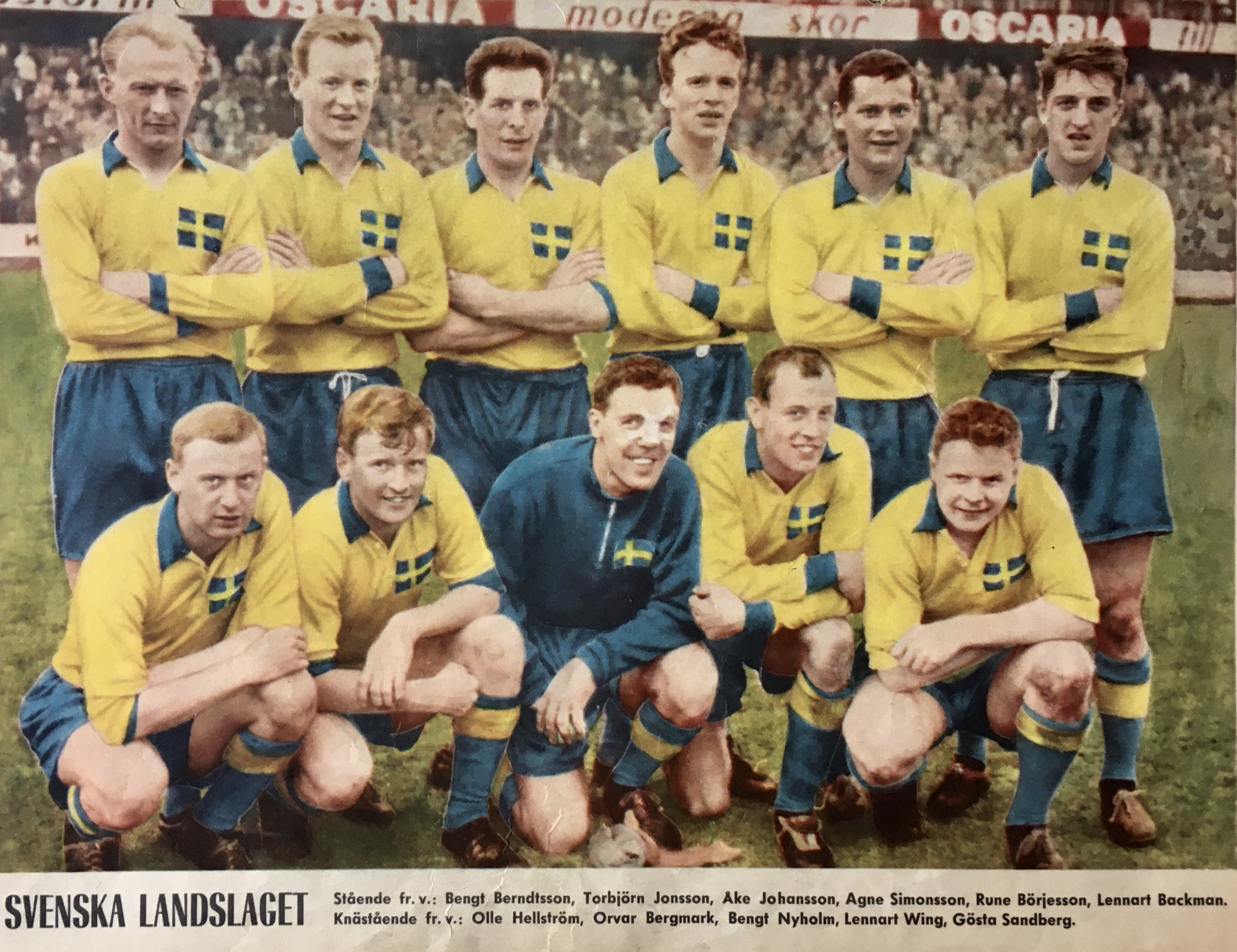
The Sweden men's national football team in 1961 with this players – from the left, standing: Bengt "Fölet" Berndtsson, Torbjörn Jonsson, Åke "Bajdoff" Johansson, Agne Simonsson, Rune Börjesson and Lennart Backman; crouched: Olle "Lappen" Hellström, Orvar Bergmark, Bengt "Zamora" Nyholm, Lennart Wing and Gösta "Knivsta" Sandberg.

Tore Klas Agne Simonsson (19 October 1935 – 22 September 2020) was a Swedish professional footballer who played as a forward. Beginning his career with Örgryte IS in 1953, he went on to represent Real Madrid and Real Sociedad in La Liga in the early 1960s before returning to Örgryte in 1963. Simonsson won 51 caps for the Sweden national team, and was a part of the Sweden team that finished second at the 1958 FIFA World Cup. He was also the recipient of the 1959 Svenska Dagbladet Gold Medal after a spectacular performance for Sweden in an international game against England at Wembley Stadium.

== Club career ==
=== Örgryte IS ===
Simonsson played youth football for BK René before signing for Örgryte IS in 1949. He made his senior debut for Örgryte in 1953, when the team played in Division 3. He helped the team win promotion to Division 2 in 1955, and later won promotion to Allsvenskan in 1958 with Gunnar Gren as a player-coach. While at Örgryte IS, he finished fifth in votes for the 1959 Ballon d'Or and was awarded the 1959 Guldbollen.

=== Real Madrid ===
Widely regarded as the best center forward in the world after a string of impressive performances for the Sweden national team, Simonsson was signed by the La Liga team Real Madrid in 1960. However, fierce competition from especially Alfredo Di Stéfano limited Simonsson's playing chances at the club and he ended up playing in only three league games during the 1960–61 La Liga season, scoring one goal as Real Madrid was crowned champions. His only goal was the third goal against Real Zaragoza in a 5–1 home win in 9th round. He was also a part of the Real Madrid teams that won the 1960 Intercontinental Cup and the 1962–63 La Liga, but did receive any playing time. Simonsson is the only Swede ever to have represented Real Madrid men’s team.

==== Loan to Real Sociedad ====
For the 1961–62 La Liga season, Simonsson was loaned out to Real Sociedad for which he scored 8 goals in 22 league games. However, at the end of the season Simonsson was forced to see his team be relegated, as the team finished 15th out of 16 teams in the table.

=== Return to Örgryte IS ===
In 1963, Simonsson returned to Sweden and Örgryte IS to form a feared striker partnership together with Rune Börjesson. Simonsson is Örgryte IS' best ever goal scorer in league play with a total of 206 goals.

== International career ==
=== Early career ===
Simonsson made his only appearance for the Sweden U21 team on 22 September 1957 in a friendly game against Finland, scoring a hat-trick in a 7–0 win. He made his full international debut for Sweden a month later on 13 October 1957 in a 1956–59 Nordic Football Championship game against Norway, scoring two goals as Sweden won 5–2.

=== 1958 FIFA World Cup ===
Simonsson scored four goals as Sweden reached the final of the 1958 FIFA World Cup on home soil, including a goal in the final as Sweden lost 2–5 to Brazil.

=== Later career ===
He was awarded the 1959 Svenska Dagbladet Gold Medal as well as the 1959 Guldbollen after his performance against England on 28 October 1959 when Sweden beat the English 3–2 at Wembley Stadium and Simonsson scored two goals and made one assist. This was only the second time in history that a team beat England at Wembley.

He won his 51st and final cap in a 2–0 win against Finland on 10 August 1967 in the 1964–67 Nordic Football Championship. He scored a total of 27 international goals.

== Managerial career ==
In 1982, Simonsson managed BK Häcken to win promotion to their first ever season in Allsvenskan. As a manager for Örgryte IS, Simonsson led the team to the 1985 Swedish Championship title, winning them their first league title since 1913.

== Death ==
Simonsson died on 22 September 2020, at the age of 84.

== Career statistics ==
=== International ===
Appearances and goals by national team and year
National team	Year	Apps	Goals
Sweden	1957	2	2
Sweden	1958	9	8
Sweden	1959	7	6
Sweden	1960	3	3
Sweden	1961	4	2
Sweden	1962	0	0
Sweden	1963	4	1
Sweden	1964	5	1
Sweden	1965	3	3
Sweden	1966	9	1
Sweden	1967	5	0
Total		51	27

Scores and results list Sweden's goal tally first, score column indicates score after each Simonsson goal.

List of international goals scored by Agne Simonsson
No.	Date	Venue	Opponent	Score	Result	Competition	Ref.
1	13 October 1957	Råsunda Stadium, Solna, Sweden	Norway	1–0	5–2	1956–59 Nordic Football Championship	
2	13 October 1957	Råsunda Stadium, Solna, Sweden	Norway	3–0	5–2	1956–59 Nordic Football Championship	
3	7 May 1958	Olympia, Helsingborg, Sweden	Switzerland	2–1	3–2	Friendly	
4	7 May 1958	Olympia, Helsingborg, Sweden	Switzerland	3–2	3–2	Friendly	
5	8 June 1958	Råsunda Stadium, Solna, Sweden	Mexico	1–0	3–0	1958 FIFA World Cup	
6	8 June 1958	Råsunda Stadium, Solna, Sweden	Mexico	3–0	3–0	1958 FIFA World Cup	
7	19 June 1958	Råsunda Stadium, Solna, Sweden	Soviet Union	2–0	3–0	1958 FIFA World Cup	
8	29 June 1958	Råsunda Stadium, Solna, Sweden	Brazil	2–4	2–5	1958 FIFA World Cup	
9	20 August 1958	Helsinki Olympic Stadium, Helsinki, Finland	Finland	7–1	7–1	1956–59 Nordic Football Championship	
10	14 September 1958	Ullevaal Stadium, Oslo, Norway	Norway	2–0	2–0	1956–59 Nordic Football Championship	
11	21 May 1958	Ullevi, Gothenburg, Sweden	Portugal	1–0	2–0	Friendly	
12	21 June 1959	Parken Stadium, Copenhagen, Denmark	Denmark	2–0	6–0	1956–59 Nordic Football Championship	
13	2 August 1959	Malmö Stadium, Malmö, Sweden	Finland	3–1	3–1	1956–59 Nordic Football Championship	
14	18 August 1959	Gamla Ullevi, Gothenburg, Sweden	Norway	3–0	6–2	1956–59 Nordic Football Championship	
15	28 October 1959	Wembley Stadium, London, United Kingdom	England	1–1	3–2	Friendly	
16	28 October 1959	Wembley Stadium, London, United Kingdom	England	2–1	3–2	Friendly	
17	18 May 1960	Malmö Stadium, Malmö, Sweden	Republic of Ireland	2–0	4–1	Friendly	
18	18 May 1960	Malmö Stadium, Malmö, Sweden	Republic of Ireland	3–0	4–1	Friendly	
19	22 June 1960	Helsinki Olympic Stadium, Helsinki, Finland	Finland	3–0	3–0	1960–63 Nordic Football Championship	
20	28 May 1961	Råsunda Stadium, Solna, Sweden	Switzerland	3–0	4–0	1962 FIFA World Cup qualifier	
21	29 October 1961	Wankdorf Stadium, Bern, Switzerland	Switzerland	1–0	2–3	1962 FIFA World Cup qualifier	
22	3 November 1963	Råsunda Stadium, Solna Sweden	Germany	1–0	2–1	Friendly	
23	29 April 1964	De Kuip, Rotterdam, Netherlands	Netherlands	1–0	1–0	Friendly	
24	5 May 1965	Nya Parken, Norrköping, Sweden	Cyprus	1–0	3–0	1966 FIFA World Cup qualifier	
25	5 May 1965	Nya Parken, Norrköping, Sweden	Cyprus	3–0	3–0	1966 FIFA World Cup qualifier	
26	22 August 1965	Skogsvallen, Luleå, Sweden	Finland	2–2	2–2	1964–67 Nordic Football Championship	
27	6 November 1966	Råsunda Stadium, Solna, Sweden	Denmark	1–1	2–1	1964–67 Nordic Football Championship	

== Honours ==
=== Player ===
Örgryte IS

- Division 2 Västra Götaland: 1957–58

Real Madrid

- La Liga: 1960–61, 1962–63
- Intercontinental Cup: 1960

Sweden

- FIFA World Cup runner-up: 1958
- Nordic Football Championship: 1956–1959

Individual

- Svenska Dagbladet Gold Medal: 1959
- Guldbollen: 1959
- Kristallkulan: 1959
- Nordic Football Championship top scorer: 1956–1959

Records

- Most league goals for Örgryte IS: 206 goals

=== Manager ===
BK Häcken

- Division 3 Nordvästra Götaland: 1977

Örgryte IS

- Swedish Champion: 1985

Preceded by Miloš Milutinović	FIFA World Cup opening goal 1958	Succeeded by Héctor Facundo
Preceded by Richard Dahl	Svenska Dagbladet Gold Medal; 1959	Succeeded by Jane Cederqvist
