= Guldbollen =

Swedish association football award

- Awarded for: Association football award
- Country: Sweden
- Presented by: Swedish Football Association, Aftonbladet

History
- Most wins: Zlatan Ibrahimović (12)
- Most recent: Alexander Isak (2025)

Guldbollen (Golden Ball) is a Swedish football award given by Aftonbladet and the Swedish Football Association to the best male Swedish footballer each year.

== History ==
The award was created by Bengt Liljedahl and between 1946 and 1965 it was awarded in cooperation with Stockholms-Tidningen.

The first Guldbollen award was given in 1946 to Gunnar Gren. In 1973, Bo Larsson of Malmö FF became the first player to win the award for a second time, having previously won it in 1965. Zlatan Ibrahimović is the only player to win the award more than twice, winning it twelve times between 2005 and 2020.

The female equivalent of the award, Diamantbollen, was established in 1990. Both Guldbollen and Diamantbollen are now awarded at the Fotbollsgalan.

== Winners ==
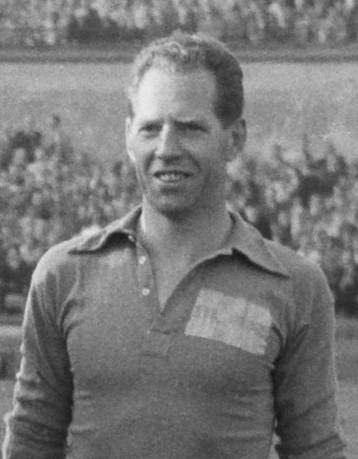
Erik Nilsson, 1950 winner

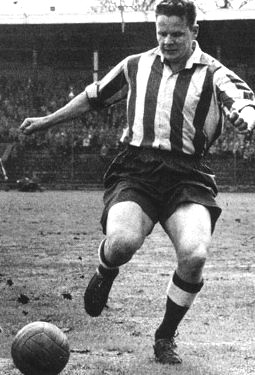
Gösta Sandberg, 1956 winner

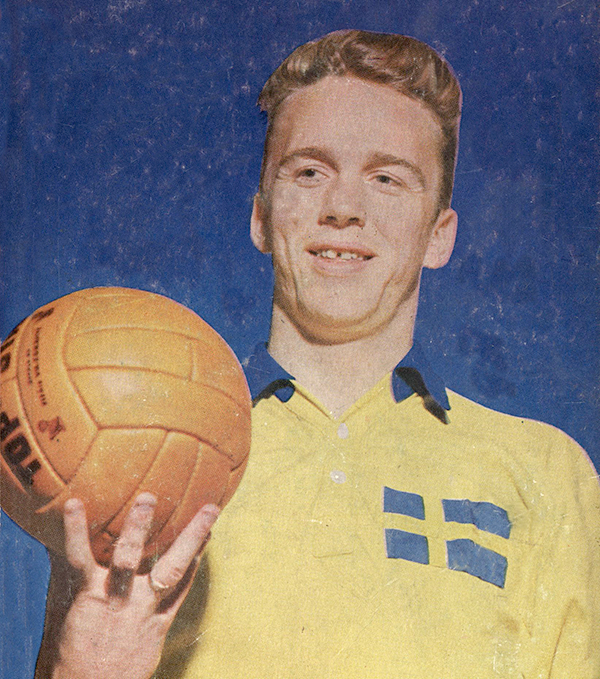
Agne Simonsson, 1959 winner

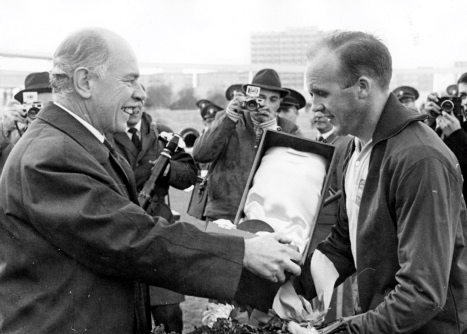
Prawitz Öberg, receiving the award in 1962

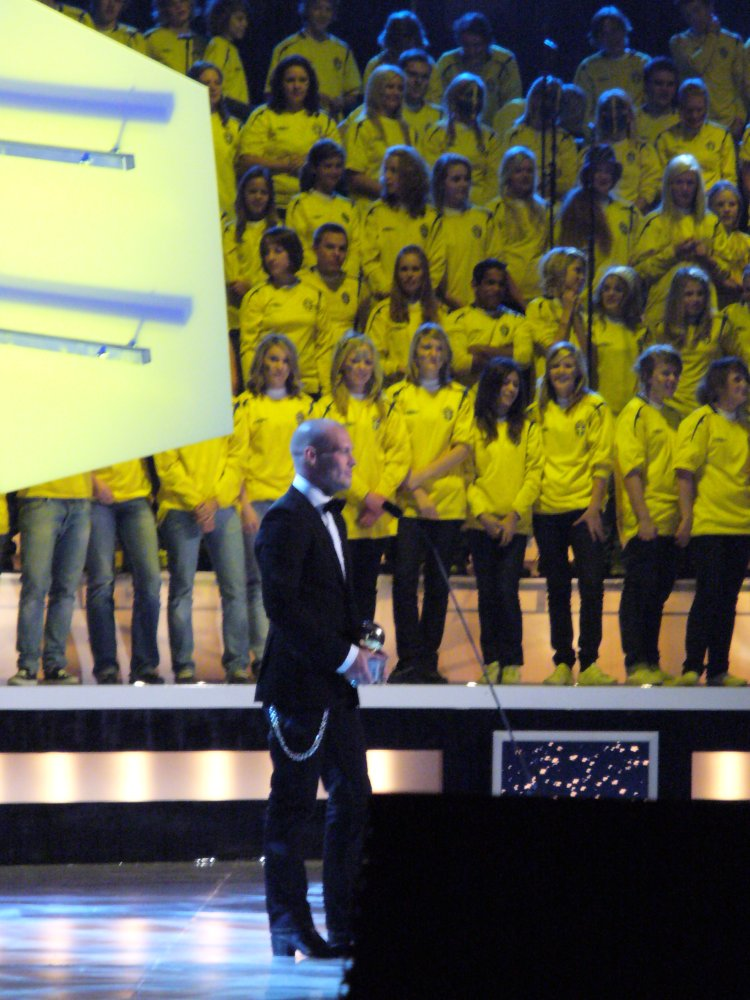
Freddie Ljungberg receiving the award in 2006

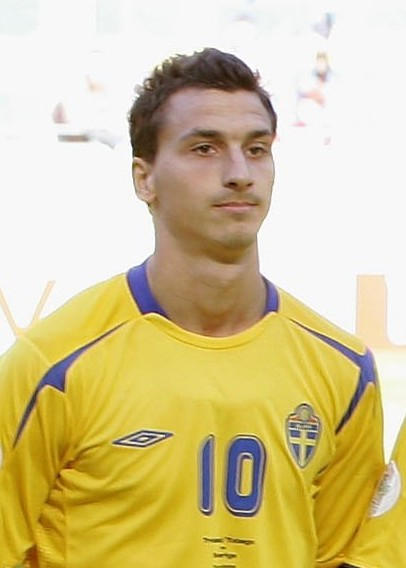
Zlatan Ibrahimović, twelve-time winner

Year	Player	Club(s)
1946	Gunnar Gren	(Sweden) IFK Göteborg
1947	Gunnar Nordahl	(Sweden) IFK Norrköping
1948	Bertil Nordahl	(Sweden) Degerfors IF
1949	Knut Nordahl	(Sweden) IFK Norrköping
1950	Erik Nilsson	(Sweden) Malmö FF
1951	Olle Åhlund	(Sweden) Degerfors IF
1952	Kalle Svensson	(Sweden) Helsingborgs IF
1953	Bengt Gustavsson	(Sweden) IFK Norrköping
1954	Sven-Ove Svensson	(Sweden) Helsingborgs IF
1955	Gösta Löfgren	(Sweden) Motala AIF
1956	Gösta Sandberg	(Sweden) Djurgårdens IF
1957	Åke Johansson	(Sweden) IFK Norrköping
1958	Orvar Bergmark	(Sweden) Örebro SK
1959	Agne Simonsson	(Sweden) Örgryte IS
1960	Torbjörn Jonsson	(Sweden) IFK Norrköping
1961	Bengt Nyholm	(Sweden) IFK Norrköping
1962	Prawitz Öberg	(Sweden) Malmö FF
1963	Harry Bild	(Sweden) IFK Norrköping
1964	Hans Mild	(Sweden) Djurgårdens IF
1965	Bo Larsson	(Sweden) Malmö FF
1966	Ove Kindvall	(Sweden) IFK Norrköping (Netherlands) Feyenoord
1967	Ingvar Svahn	(Sweden) Malmö FF
1968	Björn Nordqvist	(Sweden) IFK Norrköping
1969	Tommy Svensson	(Sweden) Östers IF
1970	Jan Olsson	(Germany) VfB Stuttgart
1971	Ronnie Hellström	(Sweden) Hammarby IF
1972	Ralf Edström	(Sweden) Åtvidabergs FF
1973	Bo Larsson (2)	(Sweden) Malmö FF
1974	Ralf Edström (2)	(Netherlands) PSV Eindhoven
1975	Kent Karlsson	(Sweden) Åtvidabergs FF
1976	Anders Linderoth	(Sweden) Östers IF
1977	Roy Andersson	(Sweden) Malmö FF
1978	Ronnie Hellström (2)	(Germany) 1. FC Kaiserslautern
1979	Jan Möller	(Sweden) Malmö FF
1980	Rolf Zetterlund	(Sweden) IK Brage
1981	Thomas Ravelli	(Sweden) Östers IF
1982	Torbjörn Nilsson	(Sweden) IFK Göteborg (Germany) 1. FC Kaiserslautern
1983	Glenn Hysén	(Sweden) IFK Göteborg (Netherlands) PSV Eindhoven
1984	Sven Dahlkvist	(Sweden) AIK
1985	Glenn Strömberg	(Italy) Atalanta
1986	Robert Prytz	(Switzerland) Young Boys
1987	Peter Larsson	(Sweden) IFK Göteborg (Netherlands) Ajax
1988	Glenn Hysén (2)	(Italy) Fiorentina
1989	Jonas Thern	(Sweden) Malmö FF (Portugal) Benfica
1990	Tomas Brolin	(Sweden) IFK Norrköping (Italy) Parma
1991	Anders Limpar	(England) Arsenal
1992	Jan Eriksson	(Sweden) IFK Norrköping (Germany) 1. FC Kaiserslautern
1993	Martin Dahlin	(Germany) Borussia Mönchengladbach
1994	Tomas Brolin (2)	(Italy) Parma
1995	Patrik Andersson	(Germany) Borussia Mönchengladbach
1996	Roland Nilsson	(Sweden) Helsingborgs IF
1997	Pär Zetterberg	(Belgium) Anderlecht
1998	Henrik Larsson	(Scotland) Celtic
1999	Stefan Schwarz	(Spain) Valencia (England) Sunderland
2000	Magnus Hedman	(England) Coventry City
2001	Patrik Andersson (2)	(Germany) Bayern Munich (Spain) Barcelona
2002	Freddie Ljungberg	(England) Arsenal
2003	Olof Mellberg	(England) Aston Villa
2004	Henrik Larsson (2)	(Scotland) Celtic (Spain) Barcelona
2005	Zlatan Ibrahimović	(Italy) Juventus
2006	Freddie Ljungberg (2)	(England) Arsenal
2007	Zlatan Ibrahimović (2)	(Italy) Internazionale
2008	Zlatan Ibrahimović (3)	(Italy) Internazionale
2009	Zlatan Ibrahimović (4)	(Italy) Internazionale (Spain) Barcelona
2010	Zlatan Ibrahimović (5)	(Spain) Barcelona (Italy) Milan
2011	Zlatan Ibrahimović (6)	(Italy) Milan
2012	Zlatan Ibrahimović (7)	(Italy) Milan (France) Paris Saint-Germain
2013	Zlatan Ibrahimović (8)	(France) Paris Saint-Germain
2014	Zlatan Ibrahimović (9)	(France) Paris Saint-Germain
2015	Zlatan Ibrahimović (10)	(France) Paris Saint-Germain
2016	Zlatan Ibrahimović (11)	(France) Paris Saint-Germain (England) Manchester United
2017	Andreas Granqvist	(Russia) Krasnodar
2018	Victor Lindelöf	(England) Manchester United
2019	Victor Lindelöf (2)	(England) Manchester United
2020	Zlatan Ibrahimović (12)	(Italy) Milan
2021	Emil Forsberg	(Germany) RB Leipzig
2022	Dejan Kulusevski	(England) Tottenham Hotspur
2023	Dejan Kulusevski (2)	(England) Tottenham Hotspur
2024	Viktor Gyökeres	(Portugal) Sporting CP
2025	Alexander Isak	(England) Newcastle United (England) Liverpool

=== By club ===
Club	Wins
(Sweden) IFK Norrköping	11
(Sweden) Malmö FF	8
(France) Paris Saint-Germain	5
(Spain) Barcelona	4
(Sweden) IFK Göteborg	4
(Italy) Milan	4
(England) Arsenal	3
(Sweden) Helsingborgs IF	3
(Italy) Internazionale	3
(Germany) 1. FC Kaiserslautern	3
(England) Manchester United	3
(Sweden) Östers IF	3
(Germany) Borussia Mönchengladbach	2
(Scotland) Celtic	2
(Sweden) Degerfors IF	2
(Sweden) Djurgårdens IF	2
(Italy) Parma	2
(Netherlands) PSV Eindhoven	2
(England) Tottenham Hotspur	2
(Sweden) Åtvidabergs FF	2
(Sweden) AIK	1
(Netherlands) Ajax	1
(Belgium) Anderlecht	1
(England) Aston Villa	1
(Italy) Atalanta	1
(Germany) Bayern Munich	1
(Portugal) Benfica	1
(Sweden) IK Brage	1
(England) Coventry City	1
(Netherlands) Feyenoord	1
(Italy) Fiorentina	1
(Sweden) Hammarby IF	1
(Italy) Juventus	1
(Russia) Krasnodar	1
(Germany) RB Leipzig	1
(England) Liverpool	1
(Sweden) Motala AIF	1
(England) Newcastle United	1
(Portugal) Sporting CP	1
(Germany) VfB Stuttgart	1
(England) Sunderland	1
(Spain) Valencia	1
(Switzerland) Young Boys	1
(Sweden) Örebro SK	1
(Sweden) Örgryte IS	1
