= Åke Johansson =

Swedish footballer (1928–2014)

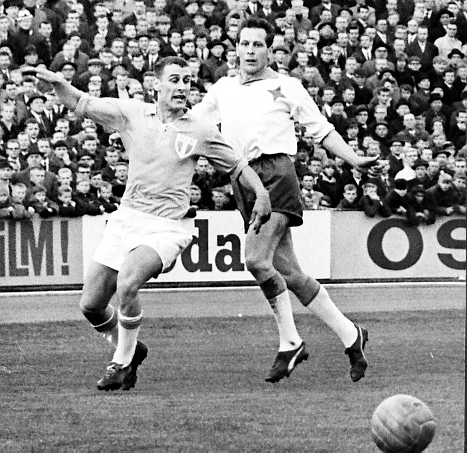
- Åke "Bajdoff" Johansson (right) facing Jan Ekström in an April 1964 Allsvenskan game between Malmö FF and IFK Norrköping at Malmö Stadion

Personal information
- Date of birth: 19 March 1928
- Place of birth: Norrköping, Sweden
- Date of death: 21 December 2014 (aged 86)
- Place of death: Norrköping, Sweden
- Position: Defender

Senior career*
Years	Team	Apps	(Gls)
1948–1966	IFK Norrköping	305	(1)

International career
1955–1965	Sweden	53	(1)
Medal record
Men's Football
Representing Sweden
FIFA World Cup
Runner-up	1958 Sweden
- * Club domestic league appearances and goals

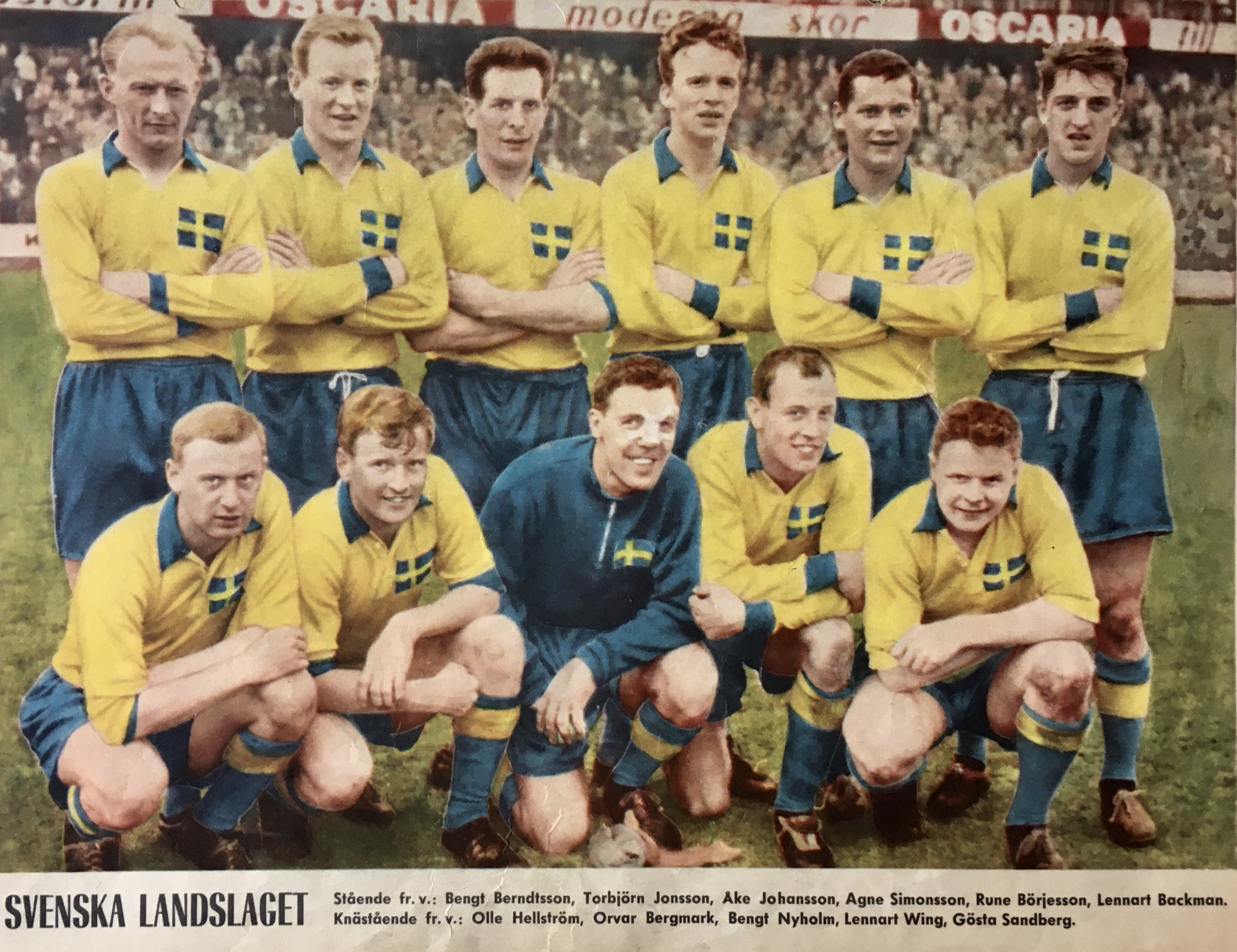
The Sweden men's national football team in 1961 with these players – from the left, standing: Bengt "Fölet" Berndtsson, Torbjörn Jonsson, Åke "Bajdoff" Johansson, Agne Simonsson, Rune Börjesson and Lennart Backman; crouched: Olle "Lappen" Hellström, Orvar Bergmark, Bengt "Zamora" Nyholm, Lennart Wing and Gösta "Knivsta" Sandberg.

Åke "Bajdoff" Johansson (19 March 1928 – 21 December 2014) was a Swedish football player.

Johansson played as a center half in IFK Norrköping and capped 53 times for the Sweden national team between 1955 and 1965. With IFK Norrköping he owns the club record with 321 appearances.

Johansson became Swedish champion with his club 6 times (1952, 1956, 1957, 1960, 1962 and 1963), won Guldbollen 1957 and was a member of the silver winning team in 1958 FIFA World Cup but did not appear in the final. He also capped one time for the national team in ice hockey. He died after a brief illness, on 21 December 2014.
