= Hans Selander =

Swedish footballer (1945–2023)

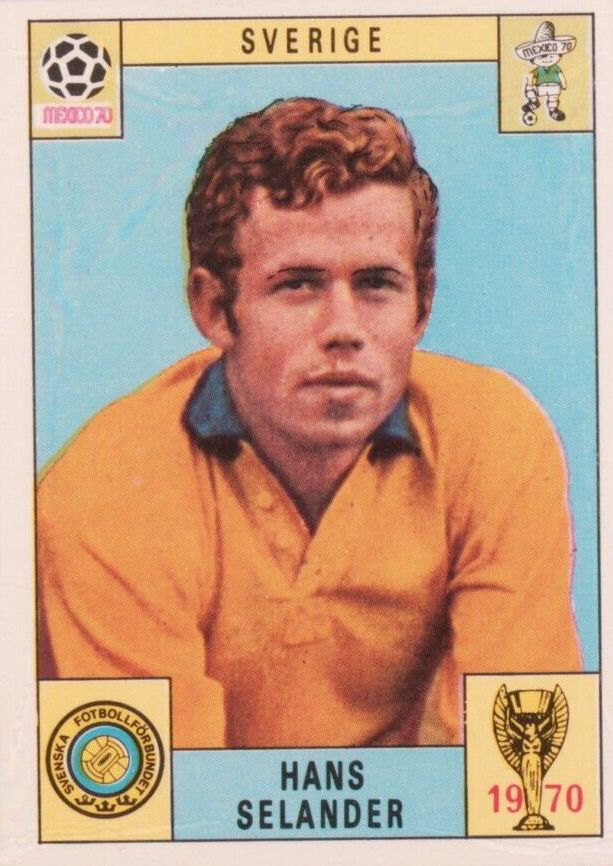
- Selander in 1970

Personal information
- Date of birth: 15 March 1945
- Place of birth: Sweden
- Date of death: 15 December 2023 (aged 78)
- Position: Defender

Senior career*
| Years | Team | Apps | (Gls) |
| 1962–1969 | Helsingborgs IF | | |
| 1970–1972 | Upsala IF | | |
| 1973 | IK Sirius | | |
| 1973–1974 | Wormatia Worms | | |
| 1974 | IK Sirius | | |
| 1975–1981 | Halmstads BK | | |

International career
| 1966–1977 | Sweden | 42 | (3) |

Managerial career
- 1982–1984: Falkenbergs FF
- * Club domestic league appearances and goals

Hans Göran "Hasse" Selander (15 March 1945 – 15 December 2023) was a Swedish footballer who played as a defender. A full international between 1966 and 1977, he won 42 caps for the Sweden national team and represented his country at the 1970 FIFA World Cup.

== Club career ==
Selander first played for Helsingborgs IF in Allsvenskan from 1962 to 1968. Then he played for the minor club Upsala IF because of university studies. He then played for IK Sirius FK. In 1973–74 he played one season in the West German Regionalliga with Wormatia Worms. After that Selander did great work with Halmstads BK and won Allsvenskan in 1976 and 1979. He retired in 1981.

== International career ==
Selander was capped 42 times for the Sweden national team and scored 3 goals (1966–1977). He was also a member of the team in the 1970 FIFA World Cup where he participated in two games.

== Death ==
Selander died on 15 December 2023, at the age of 78.
