= 1960 Allsvenskan =

36th season of Allsvenskan

Allsvenskan
- Season: 1960
- Champions: IFK Norrköping
- Relegated: Djurgårdens IF; Jönköpings Södra IF
- European Cup: IFK Malmö
- Top goalscorer: Rune Börjesson, Örgryte IS (24)
- Average attendance: 10,241

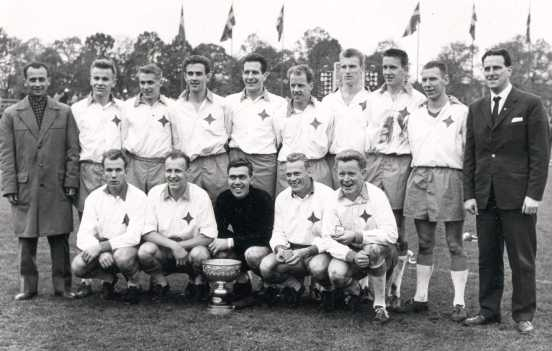
IFK Norrköping's victorious team.

Statistics of Allsvenskan in season 1960.

== Overview ==
The league was contested by 12 teams, with IFK Norrköping winning the championship.

== League table ==
| Pos | Team | Pld | W | D | L | GF | GA | GD | Pts | Qualification or relegation |
|---|---|---|---|---|---|---|---|---|---|---|
| 1 | IFK Norrköping (C) | 22 | 17 | 4 | 1 | 75 | 26 | +49 | 38 | |
| 2 | IFK Malmö | 22 | 12 | 7 | 3 | 38 | 21 | +17 | 31 | Qualification to European Cup preliminary round (Note: IFK Malmö qualified for the European Cup as Allsvenskan leaders in the spring of 1960.) |
| 3 | Örgryte IS | 22 | 10 | 4 | 8 | 52 | 40 | +12 | 24 | |
| 4 | Malmö FF | 22 | 9 | 4 | 9 | 33 | 33 | 0 | 22 | |
| 5 | Degerfors IF | 22 | 9 | 4 | 9 | 44 | 52 | −8 | 22 | |
| 6 | AIK | 22 | 7 | 7 | 8 | 42 | 39 | +3 | 21 | |
| 7 | Hammarby IF | 22 | 8 | 4 | 10 | 46 | 49 | −3 | 20 | |
| 8 | IFK Göteborg | 22 | 7 | 6 | 9 | 46 | 49 | −3 | 20 | |
| 9 | Sandvikens IF | 22 | 6 | 7 | 9 | 35 | 46 | −11 | 19 | |
| 10 | Hälsingborgs IF | 22 | 8 | 2 | 12 | 42 | 53 | −11 | 18 | |
| 11 | Djurgårdens IF (R) | 22 | 8 | 2 | 12 | 26 | 38 | −12 | 18 | Relegation to Division 2 |
| 12 | Jönköpings Södra IF (R) | 22 | 5 | 1 | 16 | 19 | 52 | −33 | 11 | Relegation to Division 2 |

Rules for classification: 1) points; 2) goal difference; 3) number of goals scored.
(C) Champions; (R) Relegated

== Results ==
| Home \ Away | AIK | DEG | DJU | HAIF | HÄIF | IFKG | IFKM | IFKN | JS | MFF | SIF | ÖIS |
|---|---|---|---|---|---|---|---|---|---|---|---|---|
| AIK | | 2–0 | 1–2 | 2–1 | 2–1 | 1–1 | 0–1 | 1–3 | 7–1 | 7–1 | 1–1 | 3–1 |
| Degerfors IF | 5–4 | | 2–3 | 2–7 | 5–2 | 3–2 | 0–3 | 4–4 | 2–0 | 3–1 | 0–3 | 2–2 |
| Djurgårdens IF | 2–0 | 1–1 | | 0–1 | 1–2 | 2–1 | 1–1 | 0–2 | 2–1 | 2–0 | 1–4 | 0–1 |
| Hammarby IF | 2–3 | 5–1 | 2–0 | | 1–2 | 2–0 | 0–0 | 2–2 | 6–1 | 1–1 | 1–1 | 2–5 |
| Hälsingborgs IF | 2–2 | 2–4 | 2–1 | 4–2 | | 1–3 | 1–2 | 1–3 | 2–0 | 1–0 | 3–4 | 1–3 |
| IFK Göteborg | 1–1 | 5–3 | 4–0 | 1–4 | 5–2 | | 1–1 | 2–5 | 1–0 | 1–1 | 4–1 | 3–3 |
| IFK Malmö | 1–1 | 1–0 | 3–0 | 3–2 | 3–3 | 4–2 | | 0–1 | 3–1 | 1–0 | 3–0 | 2–0 |
| IFK Norrköping | 4–2 | 3–2 | 4–1 | 6–0 | 2–0 | 7–0 | 0–0 | | 5–0 | 3–1 | 6–1 | 2–2 |
| Jönköpings Södra | 1–0 | 0–1 | 2–1 | 2–3 | 1–0 | 1–5 | 2–1 | 0–4 | | 1–2 | 0–2 | 3–1 |
| Malmö FF | 0–0 | 1–1 | 4–0 | 2–1 | 2–1 | 3–1 | 3–1 | 2–3 | 2–1 | | 4–0 | 2–0 |
| Sandvikens IF | 1–1 | 1–2 | 0–3 | 4–1 | 2–3 | 2–2 | 2–2 | 1–4 | 0–0 | 2–1 | | 0–1 |
| Örgryte IS | 7–1 | 0–1 | 0–3 | 7–0 | 5–6 | 2–1 | 1–2 | 4–2 | 2–1 | 2–0 | 3–3 | |

Legend: Blue = home team win; Yellow = draw; Red = away team win.

== Attendances ==
| # | Club | Average | Highest |
|---|---|---|---|
| 1 | Örgryte IS | 19,097 | 42,786 |
| 2 | IFK Göteborg | 14,726 | 24,151 |
| 3 | IFK Malmö | 12,787 | 25,291 |
| 4 | Djurgårdens IF | 10,944 | 25,932 |
| 5 | Malmö FF | 10,381 | 27,201 |
| 6 | AIK | 9,970 | 29,807 |
| 7 | IFK Norrköping | 9,902 | 15,377 |
| 8 | Hammarby IF | 9,726 | 16,274 |
| 9 | Hälsingborgs IF | 8,704 | 12,368 |
| 10 | Sandvikens IF | 8,627 | 18,120 |
| 11 | Degerfors IF | 7,359 | 18,596 |
| 12 | Jönköpings Södra IF | 5,560 | 9,065 |
