= Torbjörn Jonsson =

Swedish footballer (1936–2018)

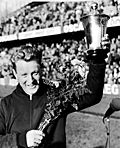
- Jonsson in 1960

Personal information
- Date of birth: 6 May 1936
- Place of birth: Ljusne, Sweden
- Date of death: 16 October 2018 (aged 82)
- Place of death: Norrköping, Sweden
- Height: 1.80 m (5 ft 11 in)
- Position: Midfielder

Youth career
- 1948–1953: Ljusne AIK

Senior career*
Years	Team	Apps	(Gls)
1953–1960	IFK Norrköping	148	(72)
1960–1961	Real Betis	0	(0)
1961	Fiorentina	8	(1)
1962–1963	Roma	42	(14)
1963–1967	Mantova	119	(17)
1967–1972	IFK Norrköping	94	(22)
Total		411	(126)

International career
1955–1968	Sweden	33	(11)
- * Club domestic league appearances and goals

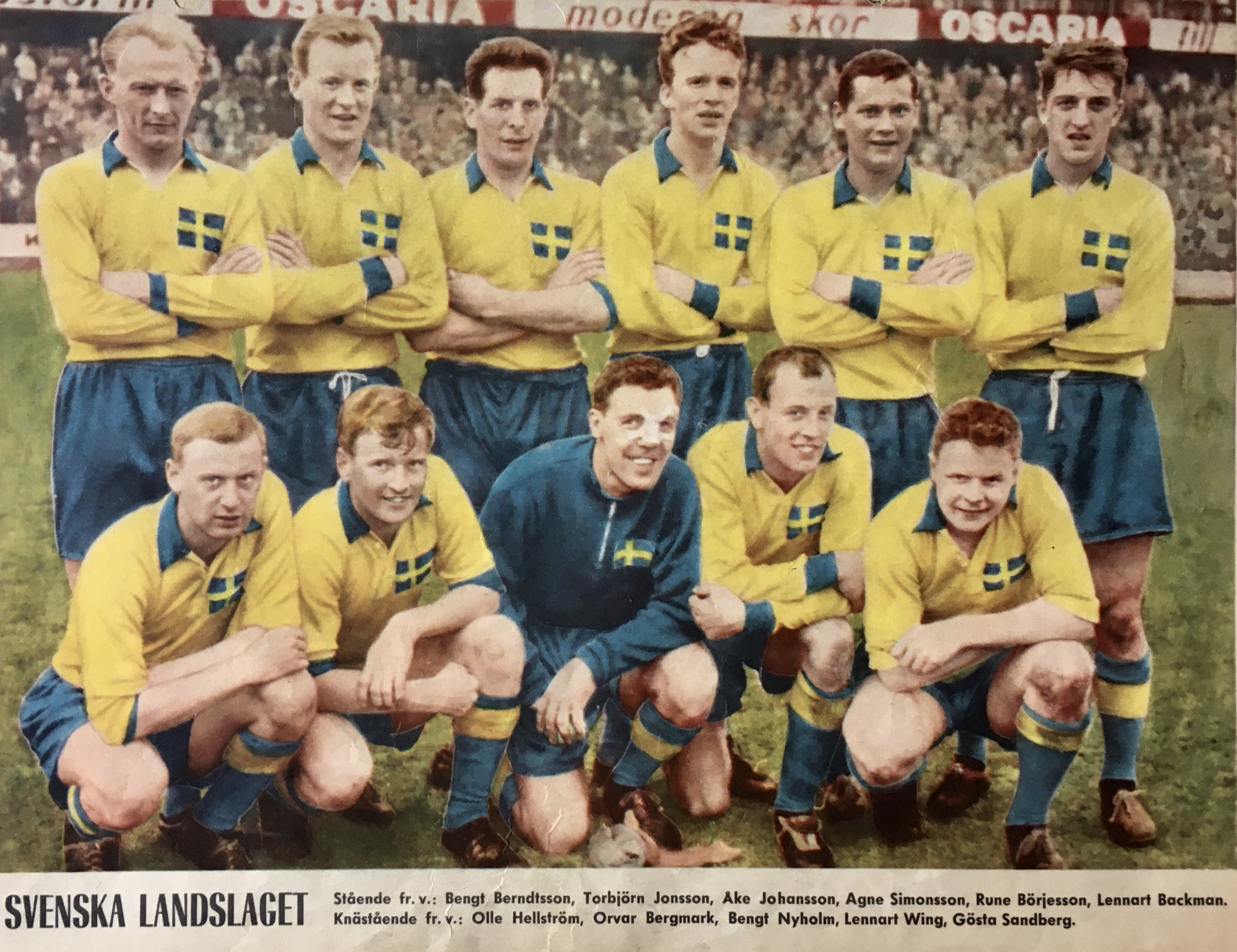
The Sweden men's national football team in 1961 with this players – from the left, standing: Bengt "Fölet" Berndtsson, Torbjörn Jonsson, Åke "Bajdoff" Johansson, Agne Simonsson, Rune Börjesson and Lennart Backman; crouched: Olle "Lappen" Hellström, Orvar Bergmark, Bengt "Zamora" Nyholm, Lennart Wing and Gösta "Knivsta" Sandberg.

Torbjörn Jonsson (6 May 1936 – 16 October 2018) was a Swedish professional footballer who played as a midfielder.

== Career ==
Jonsson played for five seasons (134 games, 27 goals) in the Italian Serie A for ACF Fiorentina, A.S. Roma and A.C. Mantova.

== Honours ==
Individual

- Guldbollen: 1960
