= History of Malmö FF =

Malmö FF's progress through the Swedish football league system. The different shades of grey represent league divisions.

Malmö Fotbollförening, also known simply as Malmö FF, is a Swedish professional association football club based in Malmö. The club is affiliated with Skånes Fotbollförbund (The Scanian Football Association), and plays its home games at Stadion. Formed on 24 February 1910, Malmö FF is the most successful club in Sweden in terms of trophies won. The club have won the most league titles of any Swedish club with twenty-one, a joint record eighteen Swedish championship titles and a record fourteen national cup titles. (Note: The title of "Swedish Champions" has been awarded to the winner of four different competitions over the years. Between 1896 and 1925 the title was awarded to the winner of Svenska Mästerskapet, a stand-alone cup tournament. No club were given the title between 1926 and 1930 even though the first-tier league Allsvenskan was played. In 1931 the title was reinstated and awarded to the winner of Allsvenskan. Between 1982 and 1990 a play-off in cup format was held at the end of the league season to decide the champions. After the play-off format in 1991 and 1992 the title was decided by the winner of Mästerskapsserien, an additional league after the end of Allsvenskan. Since the 1993 season the title has once again been awarded to the winner of Allsvenskan.) The team competes in Allsvenskan as of the 2015 season; this is Malmö FF's 15th consecutive season in the top flight, and their 80th overall. The main rivals of the club are Helsingborgs IF, IFK Göteborg and, historically, IFK Malmö.

This article outlines the history of Malmö FF from its founding on 24 February 1910 to present day.

== 1905–1910 ==
Malmö FF arose from a municipal initiative in 1905 to encourage young people in Malmö to play organised football. One of the youth teams that were created, Bollklubben Idrott, also known simply as BK Idrott, was a predecessor to Malmö FF. The members of BK Idrott joined the newly created football department of IFK Malmö in 1909, but soon left because of issues between the two clubs. On 24 February 1910 the 19 members of BK Idrott met at Malmö IP and founded Malmö FF; the first chairman was Werner Mårtensson. Initially Malmö FF continued to play in the colours of the former club, blue and white striped shirts and white shorts. However, after six months the club changed its colours to red and white and played in red and white striped shirts and black shorts to symbolize the fact that Malmö FF was a new club, the club continued to play in red and white until 1920. The first club logo was also red and white in accordance with the club kit.

== 1910–1920 ==
The club spent their first ten years in local and regional divisions as there was no official national league competition, playing the majority of their matches in the city division called Malmömästerskapen. They also competed in regional competitions in Scania, and played matches against Danish clubs. In 1916 Malmö FF reached the final of the Scanian regional competition (Distriktsmästerskapen) for the first time, playing against rival Helsingborgs IF but losing 3–4. The club defeated local rival IFK Malmö three times during the season, and thus earned the unofficial but much desired title of Malmö's best football club. In 1917 Malmö FF competed in Svenska Mästerskapet for the first time, a cup tournament for the title of Swedish champions, but lost their first match in the second qualifying round 4–1 against IFK Malmö. The club continued to play in the cup until 1922, reaching the quarter-finals in 1920 when they were knocked out by Landskrona BoIS. The cup was eventually discontinued and the title of Swedish champions was given to the winners of Allsvenskan which was first created for the 1924–25 season.

In 1920 the Swedish Football Association invited Swedish football clubs to compete in official national competitions. Malmö FF earned a place in Division 2 Sydsvenska Serien. They won this division in the first season, and were promoted to Svenska Serien Västra, the highest level of competition in Sweden at the time. However, they were relegated after a single season, and found themselves back in Sydsvenska Serien for nearly a decade until they again achieved promotion to Allsvenskan, in 1931.

== 1931–1943 – First arrival to the finest assembly and gossiping rivals ==
Malmö FF participated for the first time in Swedish top and at the time only national league, Allsvenskan, in the 1931–32 season. During their first season their local rivals IFK Malmö was relegated, which later might have an unexpected affect also on Malmö FF. And by Christmas two years later, as the club gave watches to their players as Christmas gifts, this became supposedly known to IFK Malmö. Somehow these gifts later became known by the Swedish Football Association in Stockholm, and was by them considered to be a crime against the harsh amateur rules of the time. The club was relegated and all their games during the spring was cancelled. Legendary chairman Eric Persson was for the rest of his days known to have a strong repulsive antipathy towards the yellow IFK Malmö, which likely was the gossip tubs. The club returned to Allsvenskan in the 1936–37 season. and has since then only been outside the finest league in Sweden during one single season. Time was on their side as the 1940s began. This was however not the case with their most local rivals.

== 1965–1979 ==
After winning Allsvenskan in 1977, the club qualified for the 1978–79 European Cup. After an initial 0–0 draw home against French champions Monaco it seemed difficult for Malmö FF to progress further in the competition. However the club won away on a single decider scored by Jan-Olov Kindvall. Now Malmö FF had to face the champions of the Soviet Union, Dynamo Kyiv. And after a goalless match in Kiev, suddenly the expectations rose. And with a 2–0 victory at home, the club became the second ever Swedish club to reach the quarter-finals. After an unusually cold winter, Malmö FF played Polish champions Wisla Krakow. After a 1–2 defeat away, the return match began ill-fitting for Malmö FF as the Polish side scored in the 58th minute. However Malmö FF turned the match back around as Anders "Puskas" Ljungberg scored a hat trick that together with a goal from Tore Cervin completed the comeback. With a 4–1 home victory and 5-3 aggregate score, Malmö FF now had reached the Semi-finals. In the semi-finals the club faced Austrian champions Austria Wien. After a goalless draw in Vienna, Tommy Hansson scored the single decisive goal that brought Malmö FF to the final of the European Cup. The Final was played at the Olympiastadion in Munich against Nottingham Forest, the English champions. In the last minute of the first half Trevor Francis scored the only goal for the Englishmen. Jan-Olov Kindvall however was close to scoring an equalizer. As of 2015 the achievement of reaching the European Cup final has never been repeated by a Nordic club. In recognition of the achievement, Malmö FF was awarded the Svenska Dagbladet Gold Medal in 1979. Malmö FF is also the only Nordic club to have been represented at the Intercontinental Cup (succeeded by FIFA Club World Cup) in which they competed for the 1979 title.

== 1990–1999 ==
The 1990s was the first decade since the 1930s that left Malmö FF without any trophies. The club entered the decade as reigning Allsvenskan champions and with five consecutive league titles during the last years of the 1980s. The 1990 season was the last season to feature the Allsvenskan play-offs before the introduction of Mästerskapsserien in 1991 to prevent the rapidly decreasing attendance figures in Swedish football. For the first time since 1972 Malmö FF finished below the top five teams in the league in 1990. This meant that they missed the last edition of the Allsvenskan play-offs.

In 1991 and 1992 the post-season league Mästerskapsserien was played, the sixth best teams of the regular Allsvenskan season participated. Malmö FF participated in both editions after finishing third in the Allsvenskan season of 1991 and fifth in 1992. However the club failed to make a mark in the new competition as the finished fourth in 1991 and sixth in 1992. Malmö FF's average attendance reached its lowest point since the club was promoted to Allsvenskan back in the 1930s, the 1991 season saw a meagre attendance of 4,005 spectators. In 1993 the league format was reformed to the format that existed before the Allsvenskan play-offs, the league champions was yet again recognized as Swedish champions. The league was now contested of fourteen teams, playing each other twice to make up 26 rounds of play, a format that continued until 2007.

After finishing in 10th place for the 1993 season, Malmö FF entered a fairly successful period during the mid-1990s. Between 1994 and 1997 the club finished in the top four every year and reached the 1996 Svenska Cupen Final, most notably the most recent Svenska Cupen final for the club. These results also meant that Malmö FF was entitled to play regularly in European competitions again for the first time since the mid-1980s, the club played four consecutive seasons in the UEFA Cup between 1995 and 1998, however never reaching past the first round. Notably Malmö FF faced 1979 European Cup Final opponents Nottingham Forest in a two legged fixture in the 1995–96 UEFA Cup, ultimately losing the tie on away goals. The most successful of these mid 1990s season was the 1996 season where the club finished as runners-up in Allsvenskan, however ten points behind the champions IFK Göteborg.

The last two seasons of the decade saw a decline in the club's result. The 1998 Allsvenskan season resulted in a tenth place for the team as they narrowly escaped the relegation play-offs with one point to spare. The 1999 season turned out to be a different story altogether as Malmö FF were relegated for the first time in its history and the first time they dropped down a division since the demotion in 1933–34. This ended a streak of 63 consecutive seasons in Allsvenskan, a standing Allsvenskan record as of 2015. Malmö FF ended the season in 13th out of 14th place, two points behind the teams playing the relegation play-offs. The relegation was confirmed in the 25th matchday on 23 October after a 3–0 loss against AIK at Råsunda. In the 1999 season Malmö FF had moved their home fixtures from Malmö Stadion to their old ground Malmö IP which had finished an extensive renovation project in August 1999. This was due to Malmö Stadion being too large for the decreasing attendance figures. In the end the second half of the 1999 season proved that Malmö IP was too small and couldn't provide the same facilities as Malmö Stadion could. This resulted in safety concerns that led to Malmö FF moving back to Malmö Stadion for the 2000 Superettan season, Malmö FF's first season in the second tier of Swedish football since 1935–36.

== 2000–2010 ==
The return to Allsvenskan was the start of the successful early 2000s, under the management of Tom Prahl who was appointed manager in January 2002 succeeding Michael Andersson. The club finished in the top three three times in a row under Prahl's management. In 2004, Malmö FF won Allsvenskan, the club's fifteenth Swedish Championship. This ended the longest title drought in the club's history after having won their latest Swedish Championship in 1988 and their latest Allsvenskan title in 1989. In the following season the club reached the third and last qualifying round for the 2005–06 UEFA Champions League but were defeated by Swiss club FC Thun. Successful sponsor work and player sales also made Malmö FF the richest club in Sweden, a position they still hold as of 2012. The club moved from Malmö Stadion to Swedbank Stadion in 2009, a stadium built entirely for football and located next to the old one.

In early 2009, Bengt Madsen announced that he would step down as chairman, and was replaced by Håkan Jeppsson early the following year. In 2010 the club marked their 100th anniversary with many celebratory events at the beginning of the season. On the day of the club's 100th anniversary in 2010, the Swedish football magazine Offside declared Malmö FF to be the greatest football club in Swedish history. The season became a great success as the club won Allsvenskan for the nineteenth time and became Swedish champions for the sixteenth time under the management of Roland Nilsson. Unlike in 2004, these successes were achieved without any major transfers before the season, and with a squad consisting mostly of younger players.

== 2011–present day ==
Malmö FF once again reached the final qualifying stage of the UEFA Champions League in 2011–12 after beating Scottish side Rangers F.C. in the third qualifying round 2–1 on aggregate. However like in 2005 the club failed to progress to the group stage and the competition proper after losing 3–4 on aggregate against the Croatian 2010–11 Prva HNL champions Dinamo Zagreb. Malmö FF therefore achieved automatic qualification to the group stage of the 2011–12 UEFA Europa League, the first time the club qualified for this stage since the re branding of the competition in 2009. The club finished at the bottom of the group table with one point after failing to achieve more than a draw in six matches. The other teams that was part of the group were Ukrainian Metalist Kharkiv, Dutch AZ and Austrian Austria Wien. For the 2011 Allsvenskan the club finished fourth and thefore failed to qualify for Europe the coming season. A major point of discussion during the season was manager Roland Nilsson's mid-season departure from the club in May and Rikard Norling's appointment in June. A bright point of the 2011 season was Malmö FF's progression to the quarter–finals in the 2011 Svenska Cupen, the club's best cup result since they reached the semi-finals in 2002.

For Rikard Norling's first full season as manager in 2012 the club managed had only the 2012 Allsvenskan to focus on since they had failed to qualify for European play as well as Svenska Cupen changing format to a fall-spring schedule which made 2012 a gap year with only one cup match for the club. As the season progressed Malmö FF chased IF Elfsborg in the top of the league table and spent the majority of the season in second place. With only two matches to be played the club had overtaken Elfsborg and thus a golden opportunity to win the title. A draw and a loss in the final two fixtures of the season resulted in Malmö FF dropping down to third place in the final league table. The club remain one of the dominant football clubs in Sweden. As of the end of the 2013 Allsvenskan season the club are the leaders of the overall Allsvenskan table maratontabellen. Malmö FF are also the record holders for total number of Allsvenskan championships and Svenska Cupen championships, and share the record of most Swedish championships with IFK Göteborg.
