= List of Malmö FF chairmen =

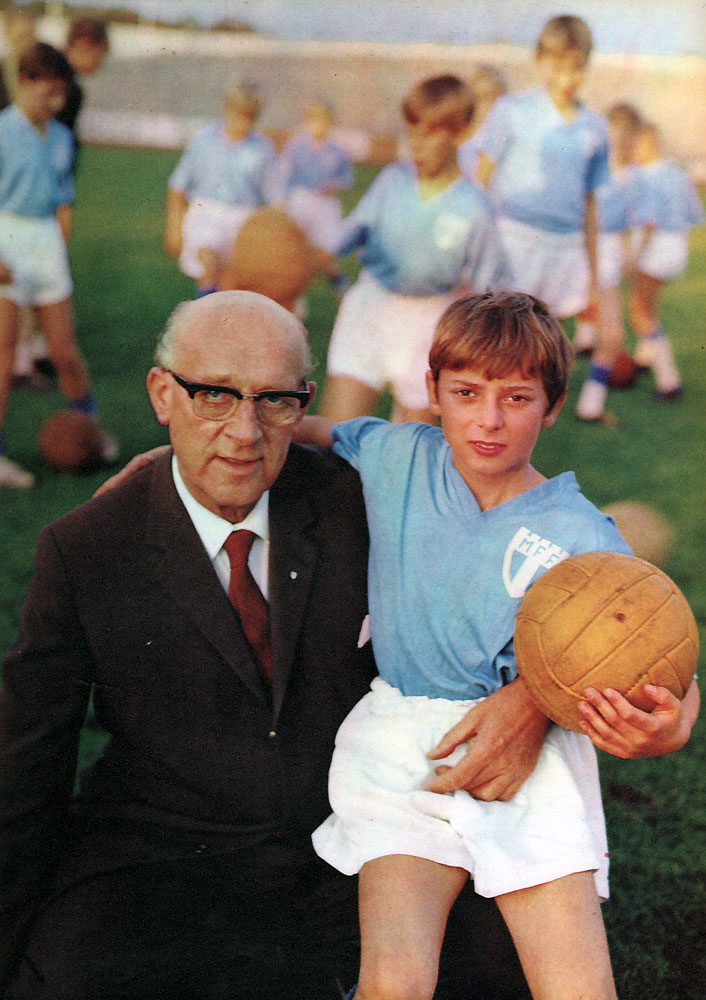
Eric Persson (left, pictured with his nephew) was Malmö FF chairman for a record 38 years, from 1937 to 1975. During this time the club won 10 Allsvenskan league championships, and lifted Svenska Cupen eight times.

Malmö Fotbollförening, also known simply as Malmö FF, is a Swedish professional association football club based in Malmö. The club is affiliated with Skånes Fotbollförbund (The Scanian Football Association), and plays its home games at Stadion. Formed on 24 February 1910, Malmö FF is the most successful club in Sweden in terms of trophies won. The club have won the most league titles of any Swedish club with twenty-three, a record twenty Swedish championship titles and a record fourteen national cup titles. (Note: The title of "Swedish Champions" has been awarded to the winner of four different competitions over the years. Between 1896 and 1925 the title was awarded to the winner of Svenska Mästerskapet, a stand-alone cup tournament. No club were given the title between 1926 and 1930 even though the first-tier league Allsvenskan was played. In 1931 the title was reinstated and awarded to the winner of Allsvenskan. Between 1982 and 1990 a play-off in cup format was held at the end of the league season to decide the champions. After the play-off format in 1991 and 1992 the title was decided by the winner of Mästerskapsserien, an additional league after the end of Allsvenskan. Since the 1993 season the title has once again been awarded to the winner of Allsvenskan.) The team competes in Allsvenskan as of the 2019 season; this is Malmö FF's 19th consecutive season in the top flight, and their 84th overall. The main rivals of the club are Helsingborgs IF, IFK Göteborg and, historically, IFK Malmö.

Malmö FF made the transition from amateurism to full professionalism in the late 1970s under the leadership of club chairman Eric Persson. An open member association, the club's annual general meeting is the highest policy-making body. Each club member has one vote, so no shares are issued. The general meeting approves the accounts, votes to elect the chairman and other board members, and decides on incoming motions. The most recent chairman is Zlatko Rihter, chairman since 2026 when he replaced Anders Pålsson. The club's legal status means that any interest claims are made to the club, and not to the board of directors or club members. Day-to-day operations are overseen by a managing director, who liaises with the chairman.

The following is a list of chairmen of Malmö FF and the club's major honours from the founding of the club in 1910 to the present day. As of the start of the 2018 season, nine men have held the club chairmanship, of whom two have held the job for multiple spells. Counting each of these periods separately, there have been 12 chairmen. The most successful Malmö FF chairman in terms of trophies won is Eric Persson, under whose stewardship the side won its first 10 Swedish championships, as well as eight Svenska Cupen final victories. Persson is also the club's longest-serving chairman, having held the post for 38 years, from 1937 to 1975.

== History ==
=== Early years (1910–1915) ===
Malmö Fotbollförening was established by 19 men on 24 February 1910 at Malmö IP. The first board of directors comprised Bror Hansson, Fritz Landgren, Werner Mårtensson, Hjalmar Nilsson and Oscar Persson. The board elected Mårtensson as the club's first chairman. He remained at this post for three years until early 1914, when he was replaced by Bertin Nilsson, who served as chairman until the end of 1915. He was in turn succeeded by one of the club's founders and an original member of the board, Landgren.

=== Landgren and Johansson (1916–1934) ===
From 1916 to 1934, Landgren and Janne Johansson took turns as chairman of the club. Landgren was first chairman between 1916 and 1918, then Johansson held the post from 1919 to 1921, when Landgren became chairman again. Johansson replaced him once more in 1927, but Landgren took over more permanently a year later. Landgren's last term as chairman lasted until 1934, when he was suspended along with the rest of the club's board of directors and several of its players, soon after the side was found to have breached the ban on professional players then active in Swedish football. The team was barred from playing for the rest of the season, and demoted a division.

=== After 1934 and the Eric Persson years (1934–1975) ===
Landgren was succeeded as the club's chairman by C. E. Eriksson in February 1934. Eriksson remained until early 1937, when he was succeeded by Eric Persson. A long-time junior member of the club's front office, Persson joined the club as a member in 1925, and was elected into the board of directors as secretary in 1929.

During Persson's time as chairman Malmö FF employed their first foreign managers and won their first national titles. In total Persson employed 15 managers, seven of whom were foreign born. Malmö FF won Allsvenskan and became Swedish champions for the first time in 1944, and by the end of the 1970s had won nine Swedish league championships. Most of the titles won during this time were under foreign managers, the most successful of whom in terms of honours was Bob Houghton, whom Persson appointed in 1974. Persson was reportedly initially hesitant to employ Houghton, who at 27 was younger than several of the club's players, but was convinced when the Englishman met them and won their respect and confidence. Houghton had never met any of the players, but had researched them thoroughly; he impressed the team by immediately recognising each of them and knowing them by first name. There was also some initial disagreement between Persson and Houghton as Persson had been used to having a final say in the team selection. Houghton wanted full purview over team selection, and Persson ultimately relented and gave it to him.

When Persson retired from the chairmanship in early 1975, aged 77, he had earned the nickname Hövdingen – "the chief". Houghton later led the club to the 1979 European Cup Final.

=== Hans Cavalli-Björkman (1975–1998) ===
Persson was succeeded by Hans Cavalli-Björkman, a CEO at Skandinaviska Enskilda Banken, a major Swedish banking group. Cavalli-Björkman continued where Persson had left off; the club continued winning league and cup honours. One of the largest achievements of the club during Cavalli-Björkman's reign as chairman was the club's performance in the 1978–79 European Cup, where Malmö FF reached the final of the competition. In the final at the Olympiastadion in Munich, West Germany, Malmö FF were defeated 1–0 by the English side Nottingham Forest, but the side's achievement in reaching the final is still the club's most prominent in European football. The club also became runners-up in the 1979 Intercontinental Cup, taking part after Forest forfeited their place in the competition; pitted against Olimpia of Paraguay, Malmö lost 3–1 on aggregate.

During the 1980s, Malmö FF won Allsvenskan five times in a row between 1985 and 1989, but were only awarded the Swedish championship in 1986 and 1988 as the club failed to win the newly constructed play-off stage during 1985, 1987 and 1989. The side won the cup four times during the decade. The 1990s was the first decade in the club's history since the first title in 1944 where it failed to win any league or cup titles. The team's best performance that decade was second place in Allsvenskan in 1996, and runners-up in the cup the same season. Cavalli-Björkman retired as chairman of Malmö FF after the 1998 season, leaving the post to Bengt Madsen, whom club members elected in the banker's place.

=== Bengt Madsen (1999–2010) ===
Madsen's first year as chairman of the club proved to be a difficult year for Malmö FF as they were relegated from Allsvenskan for the first time, leaving the top flight for the first time since the club's demotion in 1934, ending a run of 63 consecutive seasons in the first division. Madsen and the club's director of sports, Hasse Borg, initiated a programme for Malmö FF to regain its place in the top league, and the club was promoted back to Allsvenskan in 2000, after one season in Superettan. Nineteen-year-old Zlatan Ibrahimović emerged as the club's leading goalscorer, scoring 12 goals in 26 games. Ibrahimović was sold to Ajax in 2001 for 86.2 million SEK (approximately €10.2 million); as of 2012, this is the highest transfer fee paid to a Swedish football club.

The start of the 2000s saw the club regaining its place in Allsvenskan and competing for the top spots once more. In 2004, Malmö FF won Allsvenskan for the first time since 1989, and thereby ended the longest title drought in the club's history. By this time the club's home stadium, Malmö Stadion, was rapidly deteriorating, and Madsen, along with the club's board, started to plan a new stadium for Malmö FF. After a succession of mid-table finishes for the team, Swedbank Stadion stood ready in April 2009, when the club moved in. Madsen retired from the chairmanship in early 2010, the year of Malmö FF's centenary.

=== Håkan Jeppsson (2010–2018) ===
Håkan Jeppsson, CEO of Inwido, a Swedish company that sells windows and doors, was elected as the club's new chairman in February 2010. Jeppsson had previously been a member of the board and vice-chairman during the last years of Madsen's time in charge. Jeppsson's first year as chairman proved to be markedly different from those directly preceding it, as the club won its 19th league title in November 2010. The championship was much celebrated by the club's fans because it coincided with the club's centenary, and also because Malmö FF clinched the title two points ahead of their local rivals Helsingborgs IF in the final standings. The second Swedish championship of Jeppssons chairmanship was won in the 2013 season where the title was secured in the penultimate round of the league. The club also won Svenska Supercupen for the first time in 2013 with a 3–2 win against rivals IFK Göteborg. In the following season Malmö FF won yet another league title and entered the group stage of the UEFA Champions League for the first time in the club's history.

== Key ==
Table headers

- From and To – The exact dates for Werner Mårtensson's departure up to Bengt Madsen's arrival—with exception of Fritz Landgren's departure and C. E. Eriksson's arrival—are unavailable, therefore the years when the chairman held his position are displayed. The exact dates for arrival and departure are displayed from Bengt Madsen's departure up to the appointment of current chairman Anders Pålsson.
- Allsvenskan titles – Allsvenskan title winning seasons while each man was chairman of Malmö FF. This column is sorted by number of titles won. (Note: These titles are all equivalent to Swedish championship titles, except for those years noted below in footnote C.)
- Other honours – Other notable honours the club won while the chairman held his position. "W" denotes "Winners", while "RU" means "Runners-up". The cell is sorted by number of honours won.
- Ref – Referencing for the chairman

== Chairmen ==
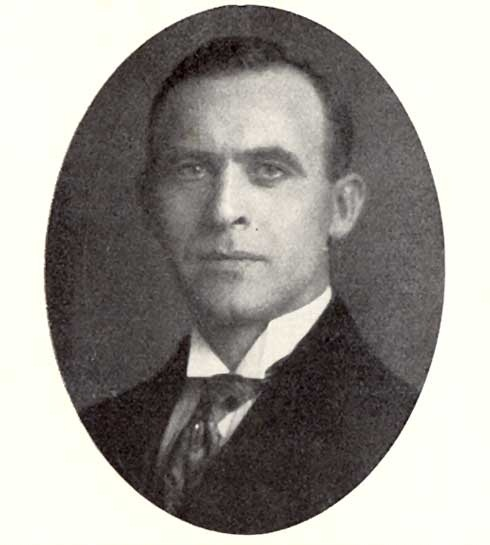
Fritz Landgren co-founded Malmö FF with 18 other men on 24 February 1910. He was also the chairman of the club over three spells, from 1916 to 1918, from 1922 to 1926, and finally from 1929 to 1934.

Information is correct as of the end of the 2025 season.

No.	Name	Nationality	From	To	Allsvenskan titles	Other honours	Ref
1st	Werner Mårtensson	Swedish	24 February 1910	1913	–	–	
2nd	Bertin Nilsson	Swedish	1914	1915	–	–	
3rd	Fritz Landgren	Swedish	1916	1918	–	–	
4th	Janne Johansson	Swedish	1919	1921	–	–	
5th	Fritz Landgren	Swedish	1922	1926	–	–	
6th	Janne Johansson	Swedish	1927	1928	–	–	
7th	Fritz Landgren	Swedish	1929	February 1934	–	–	
8th	C. E. Eriksson	Swedish	February 1934	1936	–	–	
9th	Eric Persson	Swedish	1937	1975	1943–44; 1948–49; 1949–50; 1950–51; 1952–53; 1965; 1967; 1970; 1971; 1974	1944 Svenska Cupen – W 1946 Svenska Cupen – W 1947 Svenska Cupen – W 1951 Svenska Cupen – W 1953 Svenska Cupen – W 1967 Svenska Cupen – W 1972–73 Svenska Cupen – W 1973–74 Svenska Cupen – W 1945 Svenska Cupen – RU; 1970–71 Svenska Cupen – RU	
10th	Hans Cavalli-Björkman	Swedish	1975	1998	1975; 1977; 1985 (Note: Between and including the 1982 and 1990 seasons, the Swedish football championship was decided not by the final standings in Allsvenskan, but by a play-off held following the Allsvenskan season, which pitted the four best-placed clubs against each other in a two-legged cup format. The Malmö FF team won Allsvenskan five times in a row between 1985 and 1989, but had to contest these play-offs each time to claim the national title. Though they won the play-offs in 1986 and 1988, they failed to do so in 1985, 1987 and 1989, and therefore were not Swedish champions those years.); 1986; 1987; 1988; 1989	1979 Intercontinental Cup – RU; 1978–79 European Cup – RU; 1974–75 Svenska Cupen – W 1977–78 Svenska Cupen – W 1979–80 Svenska Cupen – W 1983–84 Svenska Cupen – W 1985–86 Svenska Cupen – W 1988–89 Svenska Cupen – W 1995–96 Svenska Cupen – RU	
11th	Bengt Madsen	Swedish	1999	18 February 2010	2004	2000 Superettan – RU	
12th	Håkan Jeppsson	Swedish	18 February 2010	6 December 2018 (Died in office)	2010; 2013; 2014; 2016; 2017	2015–16 Svenska Cupen – RU; 2017–18 Svenska Cupen – RU; 2013 Svenska Supercupen – W 2014 Svenska Supercupen – W 2011 Svenska Supercupen – RU	
—	Anders Pålsson	Swedish	7 December 2018 (Acting)	1 March 2019 (Acting)	2020; 2021; 2023; 2024	2019–20 Svenska Cupen – RU; 2021–22 Svenska Cupen – W 2023–24 Svenska Cupen – W 2024–25 Svenska Cupen – RU	
13th	Anders Pålsson	Swedish	1 March 2019	6 March 2026	2020; 2021; 2023; 2024	2019–20 Svenska Cupen – RU; 2021–22 Svenska Cupen – W 2023–24 Svenska Cupen – W 2024–25 Svenska Cupen – RU	
14th	Zlatko Rihter	Swedish	6 March 2026	Present			
