= Anders Pålsson =

Swedish businessman and football chairman

13th Chairman of Malmö FF
- In office 7 December 2018 – 6 March 2026
- Preceded by: Håkan Jeppsson
- Succeeded by: Zlatko Rihter

Personal details
- Born: 12 April 1958 Röstånga, Sweden
- Education: Lund University
- Profession: Businessman

Anders Bertil Pålsson (born 12 April 1958) is a Swedish businessman who is the former chairman of the Swedish Association football club Malmö FF, a post he held between 2018 when he became acting chairman after the death of Håkan Jeppsson and 2026. On 1 March 2019, Pålsson was confirmed by the annual general meeting as the club's full-term chairman. Pålsson decided to step down after the 2025 season and was succeeded by Zlatko Rihter.

== Honours won by club during presidency ==
- Allsvenskan:
  - Winners (4): 2020, 2021, 2023, 2024
- Svenska Cupen:
  - Winners (2) 2021–22, 2023–24
  - Runner-up (2): 2019–20, 2024–25
