= Bengt Madsen =

Swedish footballer (1942–2021)

11th Chairman of Malmö FF
- In office 1999 – 18 February 2010
- Preceded by: Hans Cavalli-Björkman
- Succeeded by: Håkan Jeppsson

Personal details
- Born: 5 October 1942 Malmö, Sweden
- Died: 15 November 2021 (aged 79)
- Education: Lund University
- Occupation: CEO
- Website: Bengt Madsen at mff.se

Bengt-Åke Knud Madsen (5 October 1942 – 15 November 2021) was a Swedish football chairman for the Swedish club Malmö FF, a post he held between 1999 and 2009. Madsen is most renowned for leading the club from their first relegation in 65 years in 1999 to their first Swedish championship in 16 years in 2004. He also had a prominent role in Malmö FF moving from Malmö Stadion to Stadion. Madsen is also famous for being a controversial figure in the sport such as an incident in 2002 when Madsen verbally criticized referee Anders Frisk in half-time in an Allsvenskan match between Malmö FF and Hammarby IF.

== Career ==
=== Sports career ===
As a young football player Madsen played at Håkanstorps BK scoring 67 goals in 24 games, as of 2009 still holding the goal record at the club. After this he was noticed by Malmö FF who signed him. In Malmö FF he played with legends such as Bo Larsson and Krister Kristensson. After realising that he would not make it to the first team he accepted an offer to start a table tennis section at the club in 1975. The section was very successful and went from playing in the 6th division to becoming Swedish champions in just nine years.

=== Chairman of Malmö FF ===
In 1999, he was appointed chairman of Malmö FF, replacing Hans Cavalli-Björkman, who had been chairman since 1975 when he took the position over from club legend Eric Persson. In 2009 Madsen announced that he would step down as chairman before he reaches the age of 70. He announced his decision to not seek re-election as chairman another year and thus his resignation on 14 January 2010. On 18 February 2010 Håkan Jeppsson was named as Madsen's successor as chairman. The club won one Swedish championship during Madsen's time as chairman; this happened in 2004. Outside Malmö FF, Madsen has had a successful business career until his retirement in later years.

== Honours won by club during presidency ==
- Allsvenskan: 2004; runners-up 2002
- Superettan: runner-up: 2000
