= Janne Johansson =

Swedish football chairman

4th Chairman of Malmö FF
- In office 1919–1921
- Preceded by: Fritz Landgren
- Succeeded by: Fritz Landgren

6th Chairman of Malmö FF
- In office 1927–1928
- Preceded by: Fritz Landgren
- Succeeded by: Fritz Landgren

Personal details
- Born: Sweden

Janne Johansson was a Swedish chairman of the Swedish Association football club Malmö FF, a post he held for two periods, first between 1919 and 1921 and then between 1927 and 1928.
