= Bertin Nilsson =

2nd Chairman of Malmö FF
- In office 1914–1915
- Preceded by: Werner Mårtensson
- Succeeded by: Fritz Landgren

Personal details
- Born: Sweden

Bertin Nilsson was a Swedish co-founder and chairman of the Swedish Association football club Malmö FF, a post he held between 1914 and 1915.
