= C. E. Eriksson =

Chairman of a Swedish Association football club

8th Chairman of Malmö FF
- In office 1934–1936
- Preceded by: Fritz Landgren
- Succeeded by: Eric Persson

Personal details
- Born: Sweden

C. E. Eriksson was a Swedish chairman of the Swedish Association football club Malmö FF, a post he held between 1934 and 1936.
