= Fritz Landgren =

Swedish footballer and club chairman

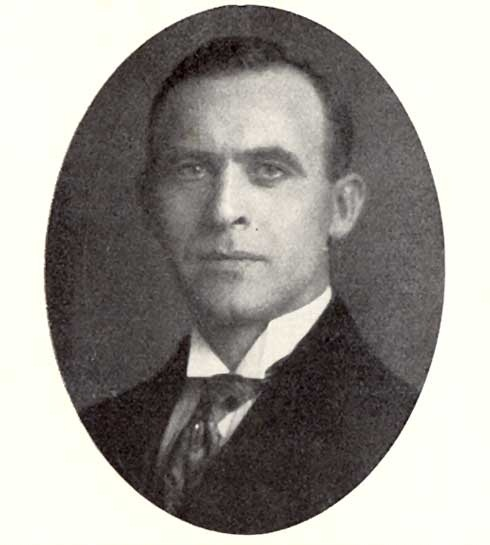

3rd Chairman of Malmö FF
- In office 1916–1918
- Preceded by: Bertin Nilsson
- Succeeded by: Janne Johansson

5th Chairman of Malmö FF
- In office 1922–1926
- Preceded by: Janne Johansson
- Succeeded by: Janne Johansson

7th Chairman of Malmö FF
- In office 1929–1934
- Preceded by: Janne Johansson
- Succeeded by: C. E. Eriksson

Personal details
- Born: January 7, 1891; Västra Skrävlinge, Malmö, Sweden
- Died: November 12, 1977 (aged 86)

Fritz August Landgren (7 January 1891 – 12 November 1977) was a Swedish footballer, co-founder and chairman of the Swedish association football club Malmö FF, a post he held for three periods, first between 1916 and 1918, then between 1922 and 1926, and finally between 1929 and 1934. Landgren also played as goalkeeper for the club between 1910 and 1915. This was before the days of league football in Sweden.
