= Västra Skrävlinge =

Parish, socken, in Malmö, Sweden

Coordinates: 55°34′41″N 13°3′15″E

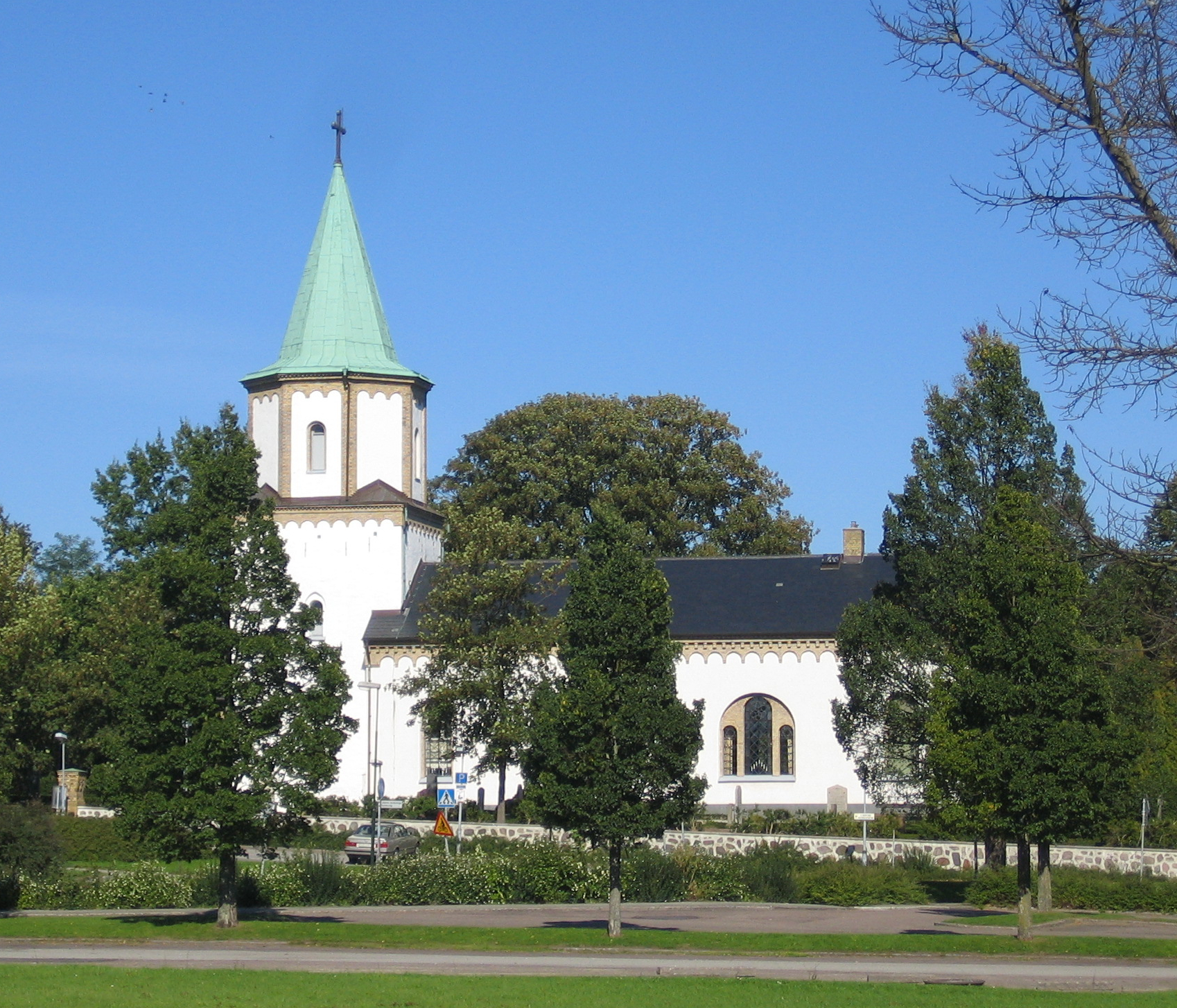
Västra Skrävlinge Church

Västra Skrävlinge socken in Scania, formerly part of the Oxie hundred, was 1911 merged into the city of Malmö, and the area has been part of Malmö municipality since 1971, and from 2016 part of the Västra Skrävlinge, Möllevången and Sofielund district.

The area of the parish was 10,27 sq km (3,96 sq mi). In 1929 it had 5,799 inhabitants. Part of the Malmö district of Rosengård is located in the parish, as well as the parish church of Västra Skrävlinge.

== History of Administration ==
The parish has medieval origins.

At the Swedish municipal reforms of 1862, the socken's responsibility for ecclesiastical matters was transferred to the Västra Skrävlinge parish, and the Västra Skrävlinge rural municipality was formed for civil matters. In 1911 the rural municipality merged into the city of Malmö, which in turn in 1971 was transformed into the Malmö municipality. In 1949 the Möllevången parish was formed and then broken out of the Västra Skrävlinge parish. As was Sofielunds parish in 1969. In 2002 those two parishes were joined as the Möllevången-Sofielund parish. In 2014 of the Västra Skrävlinge parish merged partly into the Fosie parish, and partly into the Husie parish.

The parish has belonged to counties, bailiwicks, tithings and judicial districts according to what is described in the article Oxie county. The croft soldiers belonged to the South Scanian Infantry Regiment and the Scanian Hussar Regiment.

== Ancient remains ==
Settlements from the Stone, Bronze and Iron Ages have been found. There are three burial mounds from the Bronze Age.

== Notable people ==
- Fritz Landgren (1891–1977), footballer
- Prawitz Öberg (1930–1995), footballer
