= MFF Support =

Malmö FC fan club also considered to be one of the largest in Sweden

MFF Support logo

MFF Support is the official fan club for Swedish football club Malmö FF. Founded on 1 November 1992, it has 2,195 members as of January 2014. Based on the number of members it is one of largest fan clubs in Sweden. Since the founding of the fan club in the early 1990s the number of members has been rising until recently after the 2005 season. The current chairman is Thelma Ernst who has had the post since February 2017.

== Current Board ==
As of 20 May 2017

Chairman: Thelma Ernst
Vice Chairman: Kaveh Hosseinpour
Board Members: Ola Larsson, Sebastian Olofsson, Danny Bernardo Hörlin, Gustav Rosengren, Johanna Nilsson
Deputy Directors: Åsa Wendin, Jenny Åberg

== Chairmen ==
Years	Name
1997–2004	Peter Åhlander
2005–2006	Jonas Rasmusson
2007–2009	Tony Ernst
2009–2011	Ola Solér
2011–2017	Magnus Ericsson
2017–Present	Thelma Ernst

== History ==
MFF Support found itself in the limelight during a Royal League game in 2005, the first season of the Scandinavian Royal League Football Tournament. At this event, the Danish police allegedly attacked the members of the fan club without provocation at Parken, Copenhagen. MFF Support held the police officers accountable for this scandal, and this event made several headlines in Denmark back in 2005. 2008 the officers were convicted for misconduct in Danish court.

== External sources ==
- Official website (in Swedish)
- mff.se - MFF Support at Malmö FF
