= Zlatko Rihter =

Swedish businessman and football chairman

14th Chairman of Malmö FF
- Incumbent
- Assumed office 6 March 2026
- Preceded by: Anders Pålsson

Personal details
- Born: 26 August 1970 (age 56) Malmö, Sweden
- Education: Lund University
- Profession: Businessman

Zlatko Rihter (born 26 August 1970) is a Swedish businessman who is currently the chairman of the Swedish Association football club Malmö FF, a post he has held since 2026. He is also the CEO of Mölnlycke Health Care.

== Career ==
Rihter's parents moved to Sweden from northern Yugoslavia, the area that today is Slovenia, in the 1960s. Rihter grew up in the neighborhood of Rosengård, and earned a M. Sc. in Mechanical Engineering at Lund University, with additional studies in economics.

He was the CEO of CellaVision from 2015 to 2020, and since 2020 he has been the CEO of Mölnlycke Health Care. He was also a member of the Malmö FF board between 2017 and 2020. On 6 March 2026, he was voted the new chairman of Malmö FF at the annual general meeting, following Anders Pålsson's departure.
