= Hans Cavalli-Björkman =

Swedish lawyer (1928–2020)

10th Chairman of Malmö FF
- In office 1975–1998
- Preceded by: Eric Persson
- Succeeded by: Bengt Madsen

Personal details
- Born: 29 June 1928 Jönköping, Sweden
- Died: 18 August 2020 (aged 92) Malmö, Sweden
- Education: Lund University
- Occupation: Bank officer
- Profession: Lawyer

Hans Cavalli-Björkman (29 June 1928 – 18 August 2020) was a Swedish lawyer and former chairman of the Swedish Association football club Malmö FF, a post he held between 1975 and 1998. During Cavalli-Björkman's years at the club they won four Swedish championships as well as six Svenska Cupen titles. His predecessor was Eric Persson. Besides being chairman at Malmö FF, he was also CEO of Swedish bank SEB in the late 1980s.

== Honours won by club during presidency ==
- Allsvenskan:
  - Winners (7): 1975, 1977, 1985, 1986, 1987, 1988, 1989
  - Runners-up (5): 1976, 1978, 1980, 1983, 1996
- Svenska Cupen:
  - Winners (6): 1974–75, 1977–78, 1979–80, 1983–84, 1985–86, 1988–89
  - Runners-up (1): 1995–96
- European Cup
  - Runners-up (1): 1978–79
- Intercontinental Cup
  - Runners-up (1): 1979
