= MFF Bordtennis =

Swedish table-tennis team

- Full name: Malmö fotbollförening bordtennis
- Sport: table tennis
- Founded: 1975
- Folded: 3 July 2006
- Based in: Malmö, Sweden
- Arena: Sofielunds idrottshus

MFF Bordtennis was the table tennis section of Malmö FF. Established in 1975, the club won the Swedish national men's team championship during the seasons of 1988–89, 1989–1990, 1990–1991, 1993–1994, 1996–1997, 1997–1998 and 2003–2004. During the 2004–05 season, the men's team became silver medalists at the Swedish national men's team championship. Jörgen Persson and Thomas von Scheele have both played for the club.

On 3 July 2006, the table tennis section applied for bankruptcy and the table tennis section was disestablished. Some attempts to keep the youth activity were done.
