= Werner Mårtensson =

Swedish co-founder and chairman of football club

1st Chairman of Malmö FF
- In office 1910–1913
- Preceded by: Position established
- Succeeded by: Bertin Nilsson

Personal details
- Born: Sweden

Werner Mårtensson was a Swedish co-founder and chairman of the Swedish Association football club Malmö FF, a post he held between 1910 and 1913.
