= 1971 Allsvenskan =

47th season of Allsvenskan

Allsvenskan
- Season: 1971
- Champions: Malmö FF
- Relegated: IF Elfsborg; IFK Luleå
- European Cup: Malmö FF
- UEFA Cup: Åtvidabergs FF; IFK Norrköping
- Top goalscorer: Roland Sandberg, Åtvidabergs FF (17)
- Average attendance: 9,483

Statistics of Allsvenskan in season 1971.

== Overview ==
The league was contested by 12 teams, with Malmö FF winning the championship.

== League table ==
Pos	Team	Pld	W	D	L	GF	GA	GD	Pts	Qualification or relegation
1	Malmö FF (C)	22	12	6	4	46	22	+24	30	Qualification to European Cup first round
2	Åtvidabergs FF	22	10	8	4	43	20	+23	28	Qualification to UEFA Cup first round
3	IFK Norrköping	22	8	10	4	23	15	+8	26	Qualification to UEFA Cup first round
4	Djurgårdens IF	22	11	4	7	32	27	+5	26	
5	Örgryte IS	22	6	10	6	29	28	+1	22	
6	Landskrona BoIS	22	5	12	5	22	25	−3	22	Qualification to Cup Winners' Cup first round (Note: Landskrona BoIS qualified for the European Cup Winners' Cup as Svenska Cupen champions 1971–72.)
7	AIK	22	8	6	8	26	38	−12	22	
8	Örebro SK	22	7	7	8	20	25	−5	21	
9	Östers IF	22	5	10	7	26	24	+2	20	
10	Hammarby IF	22	6	7	9	22	27	−5	19	
11	IF Elfsborg (R)	22	6	2	14	20	34	−14	14	Relegation to Division 2
12	IFK Luleå (R)	22	4	6	12	20	44	−24	14	Relegation to Division 2

Rules for classification: 1) points; 2) goal difference; 3) number of goals scored.
(C) Champions; (R) Relegated

== Results ==
Home \ Away	AIK	DIF	HIF	IFE	IFKL	IFKN	BOIS	MFF	ÅFF	ÖSK	ÖIS	ÖIF
AIK		1–0	1–0	3–1	3–2	0–0	1–1	0–4	0–0	1–0	1–1	1–1
Djurgårdens IF	1–2		3–1	1–2	5–1	2–0	3–1	4–3	3–0	1–2	0–0	2–1
Hammarby IF	2–0	1–0		1–0	0–2	1–2	1–1	1–1	2–1	2–2	1–2	1–0
IF Elfsborg	1–0	0–1	3–2		3–1	0–1	0–1	1–2	1–2	4–1	2–1	0–1
IFK Luleå	0–4	0–0	0–4	1–0		0–3	1–0	1–3	0–3	0–1	2–2	2–2
IFK Norrköping	5–1	0–1	1–1	3–0	0–0		1–0	0–0	0–3	1–0	0–2	2–0
Landskrona BoIS	0–0	1–1	0–0	3–0	3–2	1–1		2–1	1–1	2–0	1–1	0–0
Malmö FF	5–1	6–0	3–1	1–0	2–0	0–0	2–2		1–0	1–1	2–0	2–0
Åtvidabergs FF	8–2	4–0	3–0	3–0	1–1	1–1	4–1	0–2		2–0	1–1	1–1
Örebro SK	1–3	0–1	0–0	3–0	0–0	0–0	1–1	2–1	0–2		1–1	2–1
Örgryte IS	1–0	1–3	2–0	2–2	2–3	1–1	0–0	4–2	1–1	1–2		1–0
Östers IF	4–1	0–0	0–0	0–0	3–1	1–1	4–0	2–2	2–2	0–1	3–2	

Legend: Blue = home team win; Yellow = draw; Red = away team win.

== Attendances ==
#	Club	Average	Highest
1	Malmö FF	16,383	25,703
2	Hammarby IF	13,018	27,608
3	AIK	11,132	29,189
4	IFK Norrköping	9,810	20,090
5	Östers IF	9,320	14,800
6	Djurgårdens IF	8,765	26,014
7	Landskrona BoIS	8,483	15,036
8	Örebro SK	8,361	17,476
9	IFK 1900 Luleå	7,846	12,272
10	Örgryte IS	7,791	10,621
11	IF Elfsborg	7,380	9,859
12	Åtvidabergs FF	5,575	9,813
