= Håkan Jeppsson =

Swedish businessman (1961–2018)

12th Chairman of Malmö FF
- In office 18 February 2010 – 6 December 2018
- Preceded by: Bengt Madsen
- Succeeded by: Anders Pålsson (acting)

Personal details
- Born: 6 May 1961 Malmö, Sweden
- Died: 6 December 2018 (aged 57)
- Education: Lund University
- Occupation: CEO
- Profession: Businessman
- Website: Håkan Jeppsson at mff.se

Håkan Lennart Jeppsson (6 May 1961 – 6 December 2018) was a Swedish businessman who was the chairman of the Swedish Association football club Malmö FF, a post he held from 2010 until his death in 2018. Jeppsson received his education at Lund University and worked as CEO for Inwido.

== Career ==
=== Sport career ===
In his younger years Jeppsson played football at Malmö FF simultaneously as he played table tennis at IK Pallas. After a couple of years being active in both sports he decided to quit football in favour of becoming a professional table tennis player. Jeppsson had his active career at the same time as Sweden was dominating the table tennis world in the 1970s and the 1980s. After growing tired of the life as a professional player he decided to focus on a civil career and started studying international economy at Lund University.

=== Civil career ===
After graduating he worked his way up to higher positions. Jeppsson was the president of Papyrus AB from 1999 to 2002. He later went on to become the president and CEO of BE group. Jeppsson has been the president and CEO of Inwido since 2009.

=== Chairman of Malmö FF ===
Jeppsson was elected a board member of Malmö FF in 2004. Eventually he was elected vice chairman under Bengt Madsen. In 2010 when Madsen decided not to stand for re-election Jeppsson was the only candidate to succeed him and did so on 18 February 2010. In his first year as chairman and the same year as the club's centennial anniversary Malmö FF won its 16th Swedish championship.

Malmö FF had completed the move from former home stadium Malmö Stadion to Eleda Stadion a year before Jeppsson's presidency began. The new stadium created both financial opportunities as well as certain risks for the club. These risks became apparent when the club announced that the loss for the 2010 season was 30 million kronor. As a result, the club sacked its current managing director and Jeppsson announced that there would be several austerity measures to turn the result back to positive. As part of the plan Malmö FF increased their share in Swedbank Stadion to 75% to reduce costs and increase profits.

== Honours won by club during presidency ==
- Allsvenskan:
  - Winners (5): 2010, 2013, 2014, 2016, 2017
- Svenska Supercupen:
  - Winners (2): 2013, 2014
  - Runner-up (1): 2011
- Svenska Cupen:
  - Runner-up (2): 2015–16, 2017–18
