= 1952–53 Allsvenskan =

29th season of Allsvenskan

Allsvenskan
- Season: 1952–53
- Champions: Malmö FF
- Relegated: Örebro SK; IFK Malmö
- Top goalscorer: Karl-Alfred Jacobsson, GAIS (24)
- Average attendance: 10,284

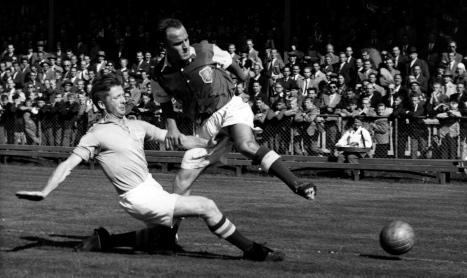
A Allsvenskan game in 1953

These are the statistics in season 1952–53 of Allsvenskan, the highest level of the Swedish football league system.

== Overview ==
The league was contested by 12 teams, with Malmö FF winning the championship.

== League table ==
Pos	Team	Pld	W	D	L	GF	GA	GD	Pts	Qualification or relegation
1	Malmö FF (C)	22	14	3	5	60	32	+28	31	
2	IFK Norrköping	22	12	3	7	49	32	+17	27	
3	Djurgårdens IF	22	11	4	7	41	34	+7	26	
4	Hälsingborgs IF	22	8	8	6	33	23	+10	24	
5	AIK	22	10	4	8	36	36	0	24	
6	GAIS	22	11	1	10	50	50	0	23	
7	Jönköpings Södra IF	22	7	7	8	40	43	−3	21	
8	Degerfors IF	22	8	4	10	41	36	+5	20	
9	IFK Göteborg	22	9	2	11	32	54	−22	20	
10	IF Elfsborg	22	7	4	11	28	36	−8	18	
11	Örebro SK (R)	22	6	4	12	23	40	−17	16	Relegation to Division 2
12	IFK Malmö (R)	22	5	4	13	29	46	−17	14	Relegation to Division 2

Rules for classification: 1) points; 2) goal difference; 3) number of goals scored.
(C) Champions; (R) Relegated

== Results ==
Home \ Away	AIK	DEG	DJU	GAIS	HIF	IFE	IFKG	IFKM	IFKN	JS	MFF	ÖSK
AIK		3–0	0–0	2–3	1–1	1–3	4–0	3–1	4–3	3–1	1–1	0–1
Degerfors IF	0–1		1–2	5–0	1–4	2–2	4–0	7–0	1–1	1–0	2–3	1–2
Djurgårdens IF	1–2	1–2		1–5	1–5	0–1	4–0	3–2	1–0	1–2	2–1	5–1
GAIS	1–2	3–1	3–2		2–0	1–1	2–4	4–0	1–3	4–2	2–1	3–1
Hälsingborgs IF	1–1	0–2	1–1	2–0		2–0	1–2	5–1	2–1	2–2	1–1	0–0
IF Elfsborg	1–2	1–2	0–1	1–6	1–2		6–2	0–0	1–0	0–2	2–2	2–1
IFK Göteborg	5–3	2–0	1–4	2–1	2–1	2–0		2–1	1–5	1–1	1–4	3–3
IFK Malmö	3–0	3–0	1–2	4–1	1–2	2–0	2–0		0–3	3–3	1–2	0–0
IFK Norrköping	1–0	2–2	2–2	5–0	1–0	1–3	5–0	2–1		3–4	2–0	3–0
Jönköpings Södra	1–2	2–2	1–1	4–3	0–0	3–0	0–1	1–1	2–3		0–4	2–1
Malmö FF	6–1	4–3	3–4	6–2	1–0	1–3	1–0	4–1	6–0	5–3		2–1
Örebro SK	2–0	0–2	0–2	1–3	1–1	1–0	2–1	2–1	1–3	2–4	0–2	

Legend: Blue = home team win; Yellow = draw; Red = away team win.

== Attendances ==
#	Club	Average	Highest
1	Djurgårdens IF	14,860	25,481
2	AIK	14,758	20,854
3	Malmö FF	14,004	21,032
4	IFK Göteborg	13,848	25,922
5	GAIS	13,067	25,326
6	IFK Malmö	9,783	17,296
7	Hälsingborgs IF	9,192	16,008
8	IFK Norrköping	7,781	13,927
9	IF Elfsborg	7,232	10,232
10	Örebro SK	6,909	11,501
11	Jönköpings Södra IF	6,675	13,317
12	Degerfors IF	5,303	10,426
