= Offside (magazine) =

Swedish football magazine

Offside is a Swedish bimonthly football magazine. The magazine takes its name from the football law of the same name.

== History and profile ==
Offside was started in March 2000. It is published by Offside Press AB six times a year but there are often an extra issue published in connection to larger events, such as the FIFA World Cup. The magazine had its headquarters in Gothenburg.

Each edition of around 130 pages has three to five long articles of 10–30 pages and several shorter interviews and reports. The coverage of the articles include the whole world—from a Flamengo match in Bolivia, to the 2010 FIFA World Cup in South Africa, to the lower divisions of Swedish football and to the fan culture around FC St. Pauli—and people that are or have written for Offside include Simon Kuper, Phil Ball, Sid Lowe, Åke Edwardson, Peter Birro and Thomas Bodström.

The two editors of Offside, Mattias Göransson and Tobias Regnell won the Swedish journalist prize Stora Journalistpriset in 2002 "with knowledge, love and feeling for the game, having moved the borders of sport journalism", and the magazine has been described as "salvation for the 'intellectual supporter'".

In 2011, Offside made an interview with the Swedish footballer Anton Hysén, in which he came out as gay. The interview received much attention in media around the world.

Offside had an average circulation of 18,400 in mid-2005.
