= Allsvenskan play-offs =

Swedish football cup

- Sport: Football
- Founded: 1982
- Folded: 1990
- No. of teams: 4
- Country: Sweden
- Most titles: IFK Göteborg (5 titles)

The Allsvenskan play-offs was a Swedish football cup held to decide the Swedish football champions between 1982 and 1990. The cup was created to increase the average attendance for Allsvenskan since public interest had dropped remarkably in the previous years. The four best placed teams in Allsvenskan qualified for the cup. The cup was succeeded by Mästerskapsserien to decide the champions.

== Winners ==
Season	Winners	Runners-up
1982	IFK Göteborg (1)	Hammarby IF
1983	IFK Göteborg (2)	Östers IF
1984	IFK Göteborg (3)	IFK Norrköping
1985	Örgryte IS (1)	IFK Göteborg
1986	Malmö FF (1)	AIK
1987	IFK Göteborg (4)	Malmö FF
1988	Malmö FF (2)	Djurgårdens IF
1989	IFK Norrköping (1)	Malmö FF
1990	IFK Göteborg (5)	IFK Norrköping

== See also ==
- Football in Sweden
- Swedish football league system
