= IFK Malmö–Malmö FF rivalry =

Association football rivalry in Sweden

Malmö derby
- IFK Malmö Malmö FF
- Location: Malmö
- Teams
- First meeting: 27 June 1911
- Latest meeting: 13 August 1986; IFK Malmö - Malmö FF (1–3)

Statistics
- Total meetings: Competitive: 61
- Most wins: Malmö FF (32)
- Largest victory: 5 August 1927; Malmö FF - IFK Malmö (0–5)

The fixture between IFK Malmö and Malmö FF is a local derby in Malmö, Sweden and was a fierce rivalry from the beginning of the 1910s to the 1960s when the two clubs regularly played against each other. The story of the rivalry between the clubs dates back to 1909 when BK Idrott joined IFK Malmö's football department but later broke away from the club in 1910 due to differences between the two clubs. The founders of BK Idrott then founded Malmö FF in 1910. IFK Malmö are Malmö's oldest football club, having been founded in 1899. Before the creation of official leagues for Swedish club football, IFK Malmö and Malmö FF played against each other in "Distriktsmästerkapen", the regional championship. The clubs later played against each other in both the second tier league and first tier league, Allsvenskan. The last time the two clubs were in the same league was in 1962 when they were both playing in Allsvenskan; IFK Malmö were relegated and have since not returned while Malmö FF have played in Allsvenskan for every season since 1926 except for one season. Rivalry between the clubs died out when they were no longer playing in the same league although they have played each other one time after this on 13 August 1986 in a Svenska Cupen fixture, which Malmö FF won, 3–1.

== Rivalry ==
The rivalry is primarily of geographic nature as both teams are from Malmö, however a major cause for the rivalry is also an incident in 1934 with both clubs involved. Malmö FF were relegated from Allsvenskan as a penalty for breaking amateur regulations. The club had paid their players a small sum of money for each game. Although against the rules, this was common at the time; Malmö FF were the only club to show it in their accounting records. In addition to relegation to Division 2, the club suffered bans for the entire board of directors and twenty-six players. The version of events told by Malmö FF and local press suggests that local rival IFK Malmö reported the violation to the Swedish Football Association. This belief has contributed to the longstanding competitive tensions between the clubs.

Malmö FF was also the club of the workers class and closely tied to the Social Democratic party, while IFK Malmö was the club of the middle class.

== Statistics ==
	IFK Malmö wins	Draws	Malmö FF wins
League	7	5	15
Cups	12	5	17
Total	19	10	32

Table correct as of 16 April 2011

== Last five head-to-head fixtures ==
Date	Home team	Score	Away team	Venue	Competition
17 August 1961	Malmö FF	1–0	IFK Malmö	Malmö Stadion	Allsvenskan
3 May 1962	IFK Malmö	1–2	Malmö FF	Malmö Stadion	Allsvenskan
12 September 1962	Malmö FF	0–1	IFK Malmö	Malmö Stadion	Allsvenskan
7 November 1964	Malmö FF	3–2	IFK Malmö	Malmö IP	Distriktmästerskapet
13 August 1986	IFK Malmö	1–3	Malmö FF	Malmö Stadion	Svenska Cupen

== All-time results ==
=== IFK Malmö in the league at home ===
Date	Venue	Attendance	Score	Competition
8 October 1922	Malmö IP	1,602	2–0	Svenska Serien
17 October 1926	Malmö IP	2,390	4–1	Sydsvenska Serien
25 May 1928	Malmö IP	4,125	2–2	Sydsvenska Serien
23 August 1931	Malmö IP	8,447	1–2	Allsvenskan
2 September 1934	Malmö IP	Unknown	2–2	Division 2 Södra
9 August 1935	Malmö IP	Unknown	3–6	Division 2 Södra
20 May 1953	Malmö IP	17,296	1–2	Allsvenskan
15 August 1956	Malmö IP	20,533	0–0	Allsvenskan
2 November 1957	Malmö IP	12,155	1–3	Allsvenskan
20 August 1959	Malmö Stadion	17,141	1–2	Allsvenskan
11 May 1960	Malmö Stadion	24,917	1–0	Allsvenskan
1 June 1961	Malmö Stadion	21,251	1–0	Allsvenskan
3 May 1962	Malmö Stadion	14,719	1–2	Allsvenskan

IFK Malmö wins	Malmö FF wins	Draws
4	6	3

=== Malmö FF in the league at home ===
Date	Venue	Attendance	Score	Competition
28 May 1922	Malmö IP	1,535	0–1	Svenska Serien
13 August 1926	Malmö IP	1,597	3–0	Sydsvenska Serien
5 August 1927	Malmö IP	2,297	0–5	Sydsvenska Serien
13 May 1932	Malmö IP	8,262	3–2	Allsvenskan
24 May 1935	Malmö IP	8,872	3–1	Division 2 Södra
8 May 1936	Malmö IP	6,668	3–0	Division 2 Södra
22 August 1952	Malmö IP	18,485	4–1	Allsvenskan
24 May 1957	Malmö IP	20,086	0–0	Allsvenskan
2 August 1957	Malmö IP	15,481	3–0	Allsvenskan
8 August 1958	Malmö Stadion	16,733	4–4	Allsvenskan
3 June 1959	Malmö Stadion	17,776	3–0	Allsvenskan
24 August 1960	Malmö Stadion	27,201	3–1	Allsvenskan
17 August 1961	Malmö Stadion	18,306	1–0	Allsvenskan
12 September 1962	Malmö Stadion	14,053	0–1	Allsvenskan

Malmö FF wins	IFK Malmö wins	Draws
9	3	2

=== Results at home in Cup matches ===
Includes fixtures for the regional competition "Distriktsmästerskapet".

Date	Venue	Attendance	Matches			Competition
Date	Venue	Attendance	Team 1	Score	Team 2	Competition
27 June 1911	Malmö IP	Unknown	Malmö FF	4–2	IFK Malmö	Distriktsmästerskapet (Quarter-final)
7 July 1912	Idrottsplats, bortre	Unknown	IFK Malmö	4–2	Malmö FF	Distriktsmästerskapet (Semi-final)
6 July 1913	Malmö IP	Unknown	Malmö FF	1–1	IFK Malmö	Distriktsmästerskapet (Semi-final)
15 July 1913	Malmö IP	Unknown	IFK Malmö	8–7	Malmö FF	Distriktsmästerskapet (Semi-final, replay)
14 June 1914	Malmö IP	Unknown	IFK Malmö	1–0	Malmö FF	Distriktsmästerskapet (Semi-final)
30 May 1915	Malmö IP	Unknown	IFK Malmö	7–4	Malmö FF	Distriktsmästerskapet (Quarter-final)
28 May 1916	Malmö IP	Unknown	Malmö FF	4–1	IFK Malmö	Distriktsmästerskapet (Quarter-final)
22 July 1917	Malmö IP	Unknown	IFK Malmö	3–1	Malmö FF	Distriktsmästerskapet (Semi-final)
2 August 1917	Malmö IP	554	IFK Malmö	4–1	Malmö FF	Svenska Mästerskapet (Second Qualifying Round)
10 July 1918	Malmö IP	Unknown	Malmö FF	2–2	IFK Malmö	Distriktsmästerskapet (Semi-final)
31 July 1918	Malmö IP	Unknown	Malmö FF	4–0	IFK Malmö	Distriktsmästerskapet (Semi-final, replay)
11 June 1919	Malmö IP	1,268	IFK Malmö	2–0	Malmö FF	Svenska Mästerskapet (Second Qualifying Round)
16 July 1920	Malmö IP	Unknown	IFK Malmö	3–0	Malmö FF	Distriktsmästerskapet (Quarter-final)
4 August 1920	Malmö IP	Unknown	Malmö FF	3–3	IFK Malmö	Distriktsmästerskapet (Quarter-final, replay)
8 August 1920	Malmö IP	Unknown	IFK Malmö	2–2	Malmö FF	Distriktsmästerskapet (Quarter-final, replay)
14 August 1920	Malmö IP	Unknown	IFK Malmö	3–1	Malmö FF	Distriktsmästerskapet (Quarter-final, replay)
8 July 1926	Malmö IP	Unknown	Malmö FF	2–1	IFK Malmö	Distriktsmästerskapet (Quarter-final)
24 July 1927	Malmö IP	Unknown	Malmö FF	3–2	IFK Malmö	Distriktsmästerskapet (Final)
27 July 1928	Malmö IP	Unknown	IFK Malmö	4–1	Malmö FF	Distriktsmästerskapet (Semi-final)
19 July 1931	Malmö IP	Unknown	IFK Malmö	2–1	Malmö FF	Distriktsmästerskapet (Semi-final)
24 May 1934	Malmö IP	Unknown	Malmö FF	4–1	IFK Malmö	Distriktsmästerskapet (Unknown round)
21 November 1937	Malmö IP	Unknown	Malmö FF	3–0	IFK Malmö	Distriktsmästerskapet (Semi-final)
5 July 1938	Malmö IP	Unknown	Malmö FF	2–0	IFK Malmö	Distriktsmästerskapet (Quarter-final)
12 July 1940	Malmö IP	Unknown	IFK Malmö	2–1	Malmö FF	Distriktsmästerskapet (Unknown round)
7 July 1943	Malmö IP	Unknown	Malmö FF	4–1	IFK Malmö	Distriktsmästerskapet (Quarter-final)
24 July 1946	Malmö IP	Unknown	Malmö FF	3–1	IFK Malmö	Distriktsmästerskapet (Semi-final)
16 July 1947	Malmö IP	Unknown	Malmö FF	4–1	IFK Malmö	Distriktsmästerskapet (Quarter-final)
15 November 1953	Malmö IP	Unknown	Malmö FF	1–0	IFK Malmö	Distriktsmästerskapet (Quarter-final)
12 June 1955	Malmö IP	Unknown	Malmö FF	1–0	IFK Malmö	Distriktsmästerskapet (Semi-final)
31 March 1956	Malmö IP	Unknown	IFK Malmö	0–0	Malmö FF	Distriktsmästerskapet (Final)
3 November 1956	Malmö IP	Unknown	Malmö FF	2–1	IFK Malmö	Distriktsmästerskapet (Final, replay)
15 July 1960	Malmö Stadion	Unknown	Malmö FF	5–3	IFK Malmö	Distriktsmästerskapet (Semi-final)
7 November 1964	Malmö IP	Unknown	Malmö FF	3–2	IFK Malmö	Distriktsmästerskapet (Semi-final)
13 August 1986	Malmö Stadion	1,820	IFK Malmö	1–3	Malmö FF	Svenska Cupen (Round 6)

Malmö FF wins	IFK Malmö wins	Draws
17	12	5
