= Eric Persson =

Swedish sports official (1898–1984)

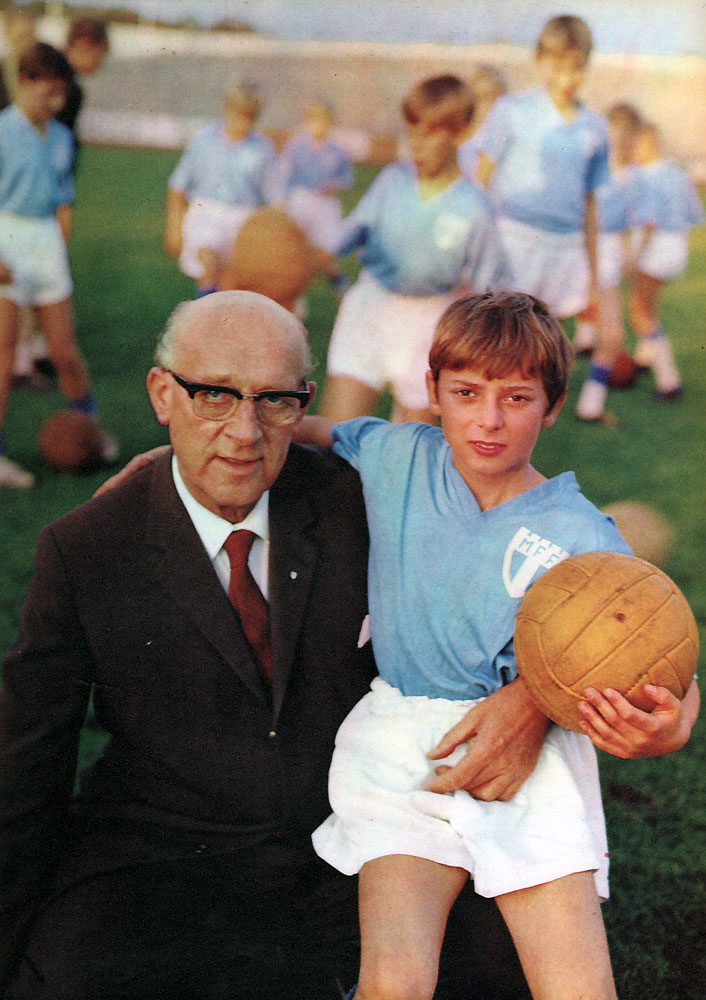
- Eric Persson with his daughter's son Mario in the mid 1960's

9th Chairman of Malmö FF
- In office 1937–1974
- Preceded by: C. E. Eriksson
- Succeeded by: Hans Cavalli-Björkman

Personal details
- Born: Eric Persson; April 19, 1898 Malmö, Sweden
- Died: June 9, 1984 (aged 86) Malmö, Sweden

Eric "Hövdingen" Persson (19 April 1898 – 9 June 1984) was chairman of the Swedish football club Malmö FF between 1937 and 1974. He is commonly regarded as one of the most prominent figures in Swedish football history.

== Chairman of Malmö FF ==
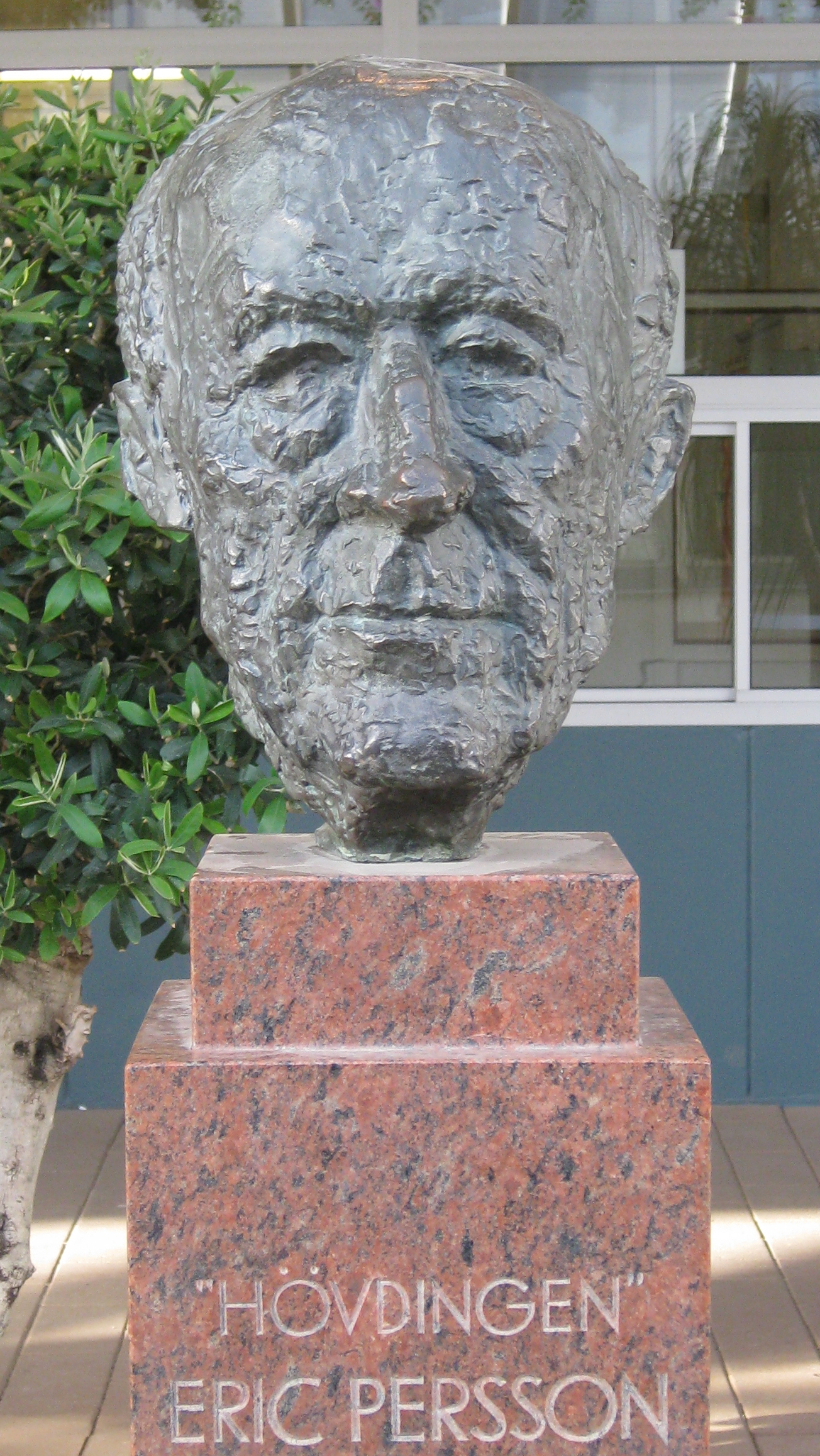
Statue of Persson outside Malmö Stadion

Persson was chairman of the club for 37 years between 1937 and 1974. He earned his nickname Hövdingen—"the chief"—because of the success the club enjoyed while under his leadership. Malmö FF won 10 Swedish Championships out of their total 18 during Perssons era as chairman.

Persson became a member of Malmö FF in 1925. In 1929, he was elected a member of the board and 8 years later in 1937, he was elected chairman of the club, a position he would hold on to until 1974. In 1944, Persson led Malmö FF to the first Swedish championship in the history of the club.

He would lead the club to another 9 victories in Allsvenskan as well as 8 Swedish Cup titles. At the yearly members meeting in 1974, he announced that he would be stepping down as chairman after the season, his successor would be Hans Cavalli-Björkman. Four years later in 1979, Malmö FF reached the final of the European Cup (The predecessor to UEFA Champions League). The club lost 1-0 to Nottingham Forest but the final is still regarded as the brightest moment of the club's history, Something which some argue would have been impossible if it hadn't been for Persson. When he was elected chairman in 1937, the club was playing in the second division in Sweden, when he left the club in the late 1970s the club was the dominating club in Swedish football and a consistent competitor in Europe.

Today, Persson is regarded as the most important person in Malmö FF's history.

== Life outside the club ==
During World War II, Persson was a part of organisations that helped Jewish people escape the Nazi occupation of Denmark. As a result, he was awarded the Order of the Elephant, the highest order in Denmark.

In 1958, Persson part of the committee who selected the Swedish national football team for the FIFA World Cup which took place in Sweden that year.

Persson was also a supporter and member of the Swedish Social Democratic Party. He was a close friend of Swedish prime ministers Olof Palme and Per-Albin Hansson.
