= Malmö FF =

Association football club in Sweden

Malmö
- Full name: Malmö Fotbollförening (Malmö)
- Nicknames: Di Blåe (The Blue Ones); Himmelsblått (Sky Blue)
- Short name: MFF
- Founded: 24 February 1910; 116 years ago
- Ground: Eleda Stadion, Malmö
- Capacity: 22,500
- Chairman: Zlatko Rihter
- Head coach: Gaute Helstrup
- League: Allsvenskan
- 2025: Allsvenskan, 6th of 16
- Website: www.mff.se
Home colours	Away colours	Third colours

Malmö Fotbollförening (Swedish pronunciation: [ˈmâlːmøː ˈfûːtbɔlːfœˌreːnɪŋ]), commonly known simply as Malmö FF or MFF, is a Swedish professional football club based in Malmö, Scania. They compete in the Allsvenskan, the top division of Swedish football, and play home matches at the Eleda Stadion. Malmö FF is Sweden's most successful football club in terms of domestic trophies won. They hold 24 Swedish championships and 16 Svenska Cupen titles, both of which are national records. (Note: The title of "Swedish Champions" has been awarded to the winner of four different competitions over the years. Between 1896 and 1925, the title was awarded to the winner of the Svenska Mästerskapet, a stand-alone cup tournament. No club was given the title between 1926 and 1930 even though the first-tier league Allsvenskan was played. In 1931, the title was reinstated and awarded to the winner of Allsvenskan. Between 1982 and 1990, a play-off in cup format was held at the end of the league season to decide the champions. After the play-off format in 1991 and 1992, the title was decided by the winner of Mästerskapsserien, an additional league after the end of Allsvenskan. Since the 1993 season, the title has once again been awarded to the winner of Allsvenskan.)

The club formed in 1910 and is affiliated with the Scania Football Association, winning its first national championship in 1944. Their most successful period was the 1970s, during which they won five Swedish championships, four Svenska Cupen titles and became the only side from the Nordic countries to have reached a European Cup or UEFA Champions League final, losing 1–0 to English club Nottingham Forest in the 1979 final. For this feat, Malmö FF was awarded the Svenska Dagbladet Gold Medal. Malmö FF also became the only Nordic side to be represented at the Intercontinental Cup, the predecessor of the FIFA Club World Cup, by competing in the tournament's 1979 edition. The club is the leader of the overall Allsvenskan table maratontabellen, meaning that they have won the most matches of any side in Allsvenkan history. They also lead the table in terms of total goals scored.

Malmö FF is nicknamed Di Blåe (Scanian for "The Blues"), and their colours are sky blue and white. This is reflected in their kit: sky blue shirts, white shorts and sky blue socks. They have two long-standing rivalries: a regional derby with fellow Scanian club Helsingborg and a competitive rivalry with IFK Göteborg. Another historical rivalry exists with local Division 2 Södra Götaland side IFK Malmö. The MFF Support are their official fan club.

== History ==
=== Early years ===
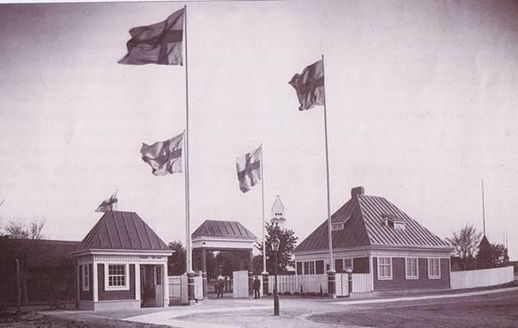
Malmö IP, the first home stadium for the club between 1910 and 1957

The club arose from a municipal initiative in 1905 to encourage young people in Malmö to play organised football. One of the youth teams, Bollklubben Idrott, also known simply as BK Idrott, was a predecessor to Malmö FF. BK Idrott joined the newly created football department of IFK Malmö in 1909, but soon left because of issues between the two clubs. On 24 February 1910 the 19 members of BK Idrott founded Malmö FF; the first chairman was Werner Mårtensson.

The club spent its first ten years in local and regional divisions as there was no official national league competition, playing the majority of their matches in the city division called the Malmömästerskapen. They also competed in regional competitions in Scania, and played matches against Danish clubs. In 1916 Malmö FF reached the final of the Scanian regional competition (Distriktsmästerskapen) for the first time, playing against rivals Helsingborgs IF but losing 3–4. The club defeated local rivals IFK Malmö three times during the season, and thus earned the unofficial but much desired title of Malmö's best football club. In 1917 Malmö FF competed for the first time in Svenska Mästerskapet, a cup tournament for the title of Swedish champions, but lost their first match in the second qualifying round 4–1 against IFK Malmö. The club continued to play in the cup until 1922, reaching the quarter-finals in 1920 when they were knocked out by Landskrona BoIS. The cup was eventually discontinued and the title of Swedish champions was given to the winners of the Allsvenskan which was first created for the 1924–25 season.

In 1920 the Swedish Football Association invited Swedish football clubs to compete in official national competitions. Malmö FF earned a place in the Division 2 Sydsvenska Serien. They won this division in the first season, and were promoted to the Svenska Serien Västra, the highest level of competition in Sweden at the time. However, they were relegated after a single season, and found themselves back in Sydsvenska Serien for nearly a decade until they again achieved promotion to Allsvenskan, in 1931.

=== First years in the Allsvenskan and early achievements ===
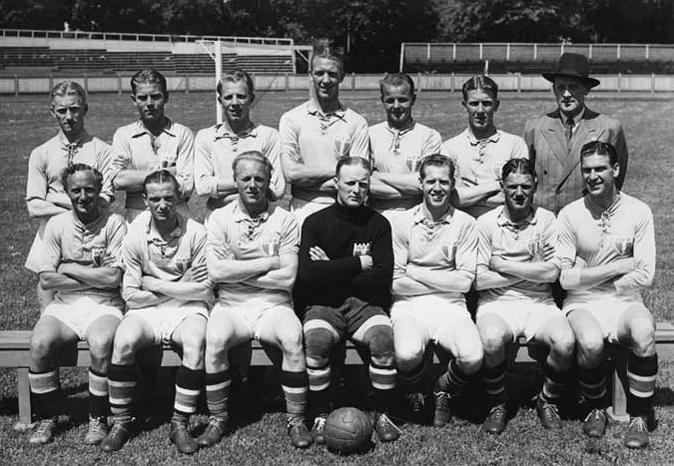
The Malmö FF team of 1943–44

The club achieved mid-table league positions for two seasons, but was relegated in 1934 as a penalty for breaking amateur regulations. The club had paid their players a small sum of money for each game. Although against the rules, this was common at the time; Malmö FF was the only club to show it in the accounting records. In addition to relegation to Division 2, the club suffered bans for the entire board of directors and twenty-six players. The version of events told by Malmö FF and local press suggests that local rival, IFK Malmö, had reported the violation to the Swedish Football Association. This belief has contributed to the longstanding competitive tensions between the clubs.

The club made their way back to the Allsvenskan in 1937 after two seasons in the Division 2. In the same year Eric Persson was elected as chairman after being secretary since 1929, and held the position until 1974. Persson is regarded by club leaders and fans as the most important person in the club's history, as he turned the club professional in the 1970s. Under his leadership the club went from being titleless in 1937 to holding ten Swedish championships by the end of the 1974 season. In 1939 the club reached its highest position yet, third place in the Allsvenskan, nine points behind champions IF Elfsborg. Malmö FF's first Swedish championship came in 1944, when the club won the penultimate game of the season against AIK before 36,000 spectators at the Råsunda. The last game of the season was won 7–0 against Halmstad BK.

The following nine seasons, Malmö FF finished in the top three in the league. The club won the Swedish Championship in 1949, 1950, 1951 and 1953, and were runners-up in 1946, 1948 and 1952. The club also won the Svenska Cupen in 1944, 1946, 1947, 1951 and 1953, and finished as runners-up in 1945. Between 6 May 1949 and 1 June 1951, the team were unbeaten in 49 matches, of which 23 were an unbroken streak of victories.

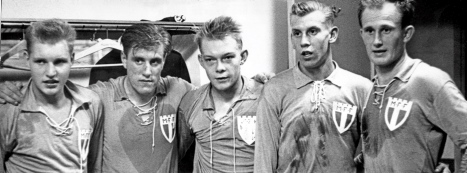
Young players in the 1960s

The club finished as runners-up in the Allsvenskan twice more, in 1956 and 1957. The following year the club left Malmö IP for Malmö Stadion, which had been built for the 1958 FIFA World Cup, and was to host the club for 50 years. In 1964 Malmö FF contracted Spanish manager Antonio Durán; this was the first of a series of changes that led to the most successful era in the club's history. Young talents such as Lars Granström and Bo Larsson emerged during the early 1960s and would prove to be crucial ingredients in the success that would come in the 1970s. The club finished second in 1964 but went on to win their sixth Swedish Championship in 1965, when Bo Larsson scored 28 goals to finish as the league's top goal scorer. Malmö FF once again won the Allsvenskan in 1967, after a less successful year in 1966. The club's young players, as well as talents bought in from neighbouring clubs in Scania in 1967, became a team that consistently finished in the top three in the Allsvenskan.

=== Successful 1970s, European Cup 1979, 1980s and 1990s ===
After finishing as runners-up in Allsvenskan for the final two years of the 1960s, Malmö FF started the most successful decade of their history with a Swedish Championship in 1970. The club won Allsvenskan in 1970, 1971, 1974, 1975 and 1977 as well as Svenska Cupen in 1976 and 1978. The 1977 Allsvenskan victory qualified the club for the 1978–79 European Cup, and after victories against AS Monaco, Dynamo Kyiv, Wisła Kraków and Austria Wien, Malmö FF reached the final of the competition, which was played at the Olympiastadion in Munich against Nottingham Forest. Trevor Francis, who scored the only goal of the match, won it 1–0 for Nottingham Forest. Nevertheless, the 1979 European Cup run is the biggest success in the history of Malmö FF. The team were given the Svenska Dagbladet Gold Medal the same year, awarded for the most significant Swedish sporting achievement of the year, for their achievement in the European Cup.

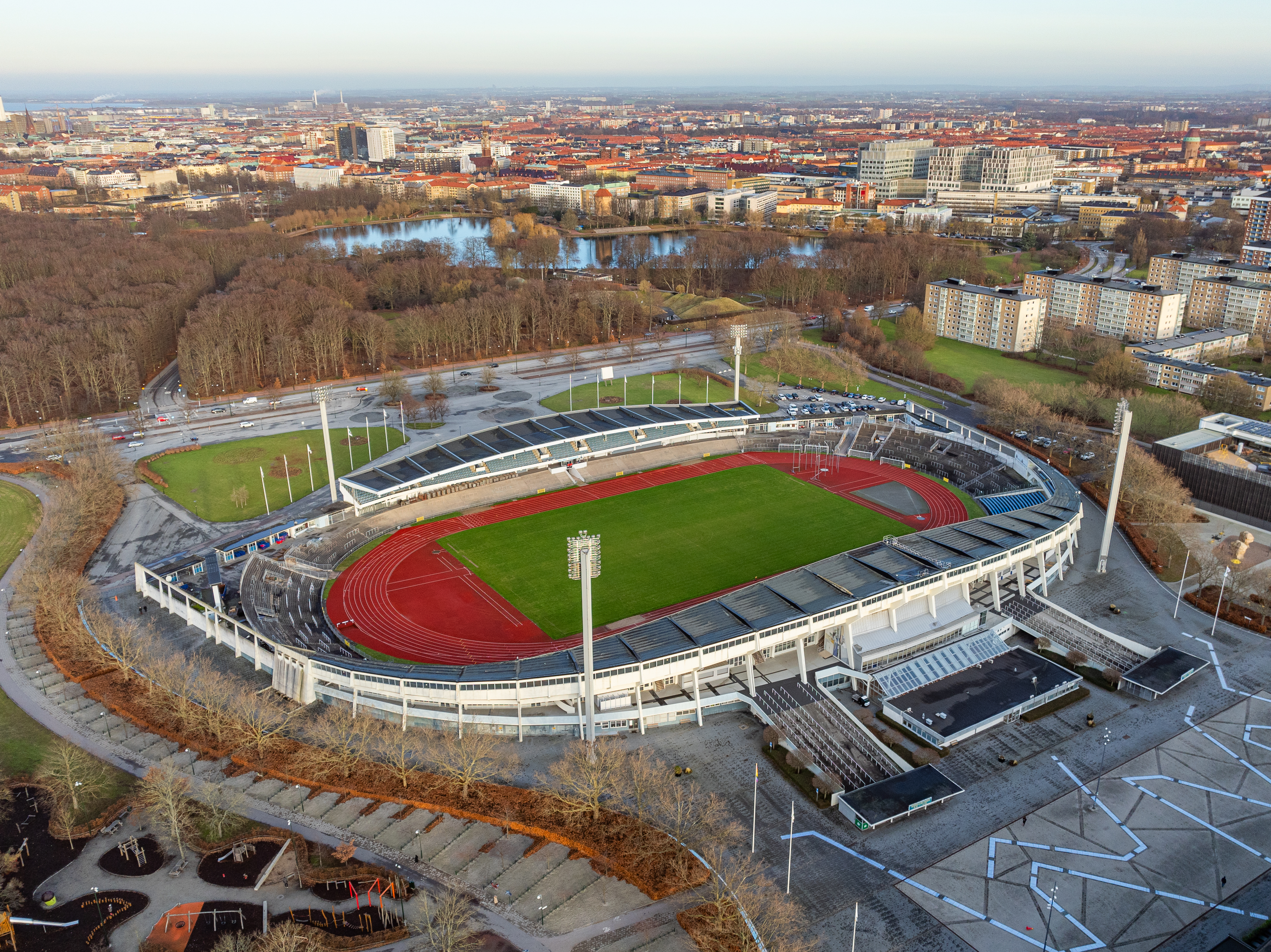
Malmö Stadion, the home stadium for the club between 1958 and 2008

Much of the success during the 1970s was due to new tactics and training methods brought to the club by Englishman Bob Houghton, who managed the club between 1974 and 1980. Eric Persson was succeeded as chairman in 1974 by Hans Cavalli-Björkman. After the team performed respectably under managers Keith Blunt and Tord Grip in the early 1980s, Roy Hodgson took over in 1985. Roy Hodgson led Malmö FF to two Swedish Championships in 1986 and 1988, and the club won Allsvenskan five years in a row between 1985 and 1989. At the time, the championship was decided by play-offs between the best teams after the end of the regular season; this arrangement was in place from 1982 until 1992. The club reached the play-off final four times between 1986 and 1989 but only managed to win the final twice. Apart from Allsvenskan and Swedish Championships, Malmö FF won Svenska Cupen in 1984, 1986 and 1989.

Other than finishing as runners-up in Allsvenskan in 1996, the team did not excel in the 1990s, as the club failed to win Allsvenskan and Svenska Cupen throughout the entire decade. The 1990s ended with relegation from Allsvenskan in 1999. Hans Cavalli-Björkman was succeeded as chairman by Bengt Madsen in 1999, and former player Hasse Borg was contracted as Director of Sport. These operational changes, as well as the emergence of young talent Zlatan Ibrahimović, led to the return to Allsvenskan in 2001. Ibrahimović rose to fame and became an important player in Malmö FF's campaign to return to the top league. He was later sold to Ajax in 2001, before playing for several European clubs in Italy's Serie A, FC Barcelona in Spain's La Liga, Paris Saint-Germain in France's Ligue 1, Manchester United F.C. in England's Premier League, LA Galaxy in the MLS, and AC Milan again until his retirement in 2023.

=== Start of the 2000s to the present ===
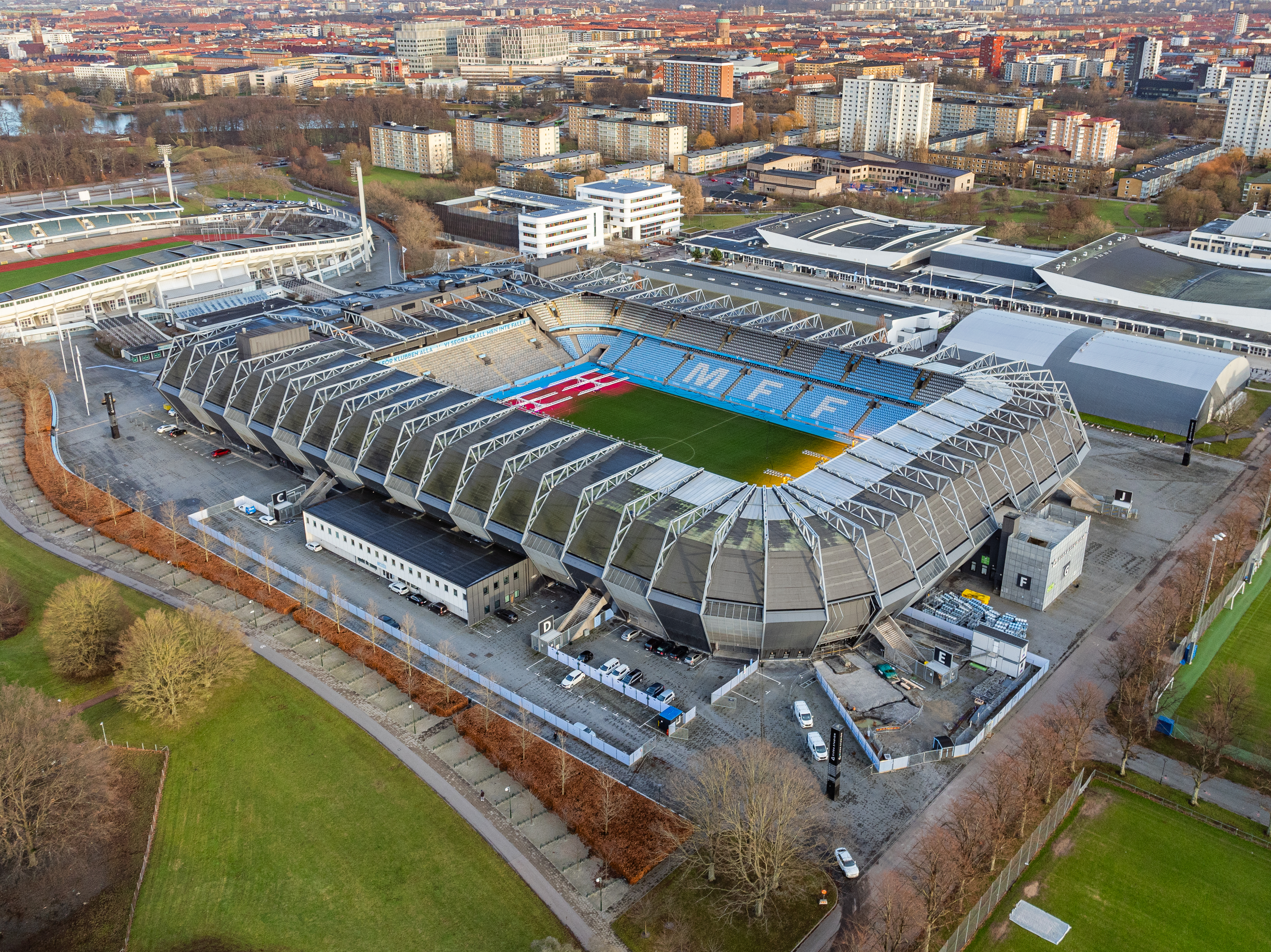
Eleda Stadion

The return to Allsvenskan was the start of the successful early 2000s, under the management of Tom Prahl, when the club finished in the top three times in a row. In 2004, it won Allsvenskan, the club's fifteenth Swedish Championship. In 2005, the club reached the last qualifying round for the UEFA Champions League but were defeated by FC Thun. Successful sponsor work and player sales also made Malmö FF the richest club in Sweden. This position was further cemented by the successive Champions League group stage appearances the two following years. Malmö FF moved from Malmö Stadion to Eleda Stadion in 2009, a stadium built entirely for football and located next to the old one.

In 2009, Madsen announced that he would step down as chairman, and was replaced by Håkan Jeppsson early the following year. In 2010, the club marked their 100th anniversary with many celebratory events at the beginning of the season. On the day of the club's 100th anniversary in 2010, the Swedish football magazine Offside declared Malmö FF to be the greatest football club in Swedish history. The season became a great success as the club won Allsvenskan for the nineteenth time and became Swedish champions for the sixteenth time. Unlike in 2004, these successes were achieved without any major transfers before the season, and with a squad consisting mostly of younger players.

In October 2013, Malmö FF won their seventeenth Swedish championship and 20th Allsvenskan title in the penultimate round of the league away from home. Similar to 2010, the title was the result of a young squad. The average age of the squad, 23.8 years, was the youngest team to become champions since the beginning of the 21st century. The following year Malmö FF qualified for the group stage of the 2014–15 UEFA Champions League by beating Ventspils, Sparta Prague and Red Bull Salzburg in the qualifying rounds. This was the first time the club qualified for the competition proper since the re-branding from the European Cup in the 1992–93 season and the first time since the 2000–01 season that a Swedish club qualified. In the following months Malmö FF defended their league title, winning their eighteenth Swedish championship and 21st Allsvenskan title. This was the first time a club defended the Allsvenskan title since the 2003 season.

Chart of Malmö's yearly table positions in the Swedish football league system.

The 2015 season saw Malmö FF failing to retaining the title and missing out on the top-four for the first time since 2009. However, the club managed to qualify once again to the group stages of the UEFA Champions League in the 2015–16 UEFA Champions League edition, beating Žalgiris Vilnius, Red Bull Salzburg and Celtic in qualifiers. In October 2016, Malmö FF won their nineteenth Swedish championship and 22nd Allsvenskan title. The title was Malmö FF's third in the span of four years. This resulted in the club surpassing IFK Göteborg in terms of Swedish championship titles, indisputably becoming the most successful Swedish football club of all time in terms of domestic titles while still being second behind IFK Göteborg in terms of European titles.

The 2020s have brought renewed national success to the club, winning the Allsvenskan in 2020, 2021, 2023 and 2024, reaching a total of 27 league titles, while reaching the Champions League group stage in the 2021–22 edition and reaching the knockout stages of the UEFA Europa League in 2019–20, under the management of Jon Dahl Tomasson and Henrik Rydström.

Malmö FF is a dominant force in Sweden. As of the end of the 2021 Allsvenskan season, the club are the leaders of the overall Allsvenskan table maratontabellen. Malmö FF are also the record holders for the total number of Swedish championships, Allsvenskan titles and Svenska Cupen titles.

== Colours and crest ==
Because of the club colours, sky blue and white, the club is often known by the nicknames Di blåe (Scanian: The Blues) and Himmelsblått (The Sky Blues). The home kit is sky-blue shirts, white shorts, and sky-blue socks. The away strip is black. Various alternative kits have been used for European play such as an all-white kit introduced in the 1950s, and re-used for the 2011 and 2012 seasons, and all-black kits with sky-blue and golden trimmings were used for the European campaigns in 2005 and 2013.

=== Kit evolution ===
Home kit for the 1910 season
Home kit between 1910 and 1920
Home kit from 1920 to the present

The club colours have not always been sky blue. The predecessor club BK Idrott wore blue and white striped shirts and white shorts, and this kit was still used for the first six months of 1910 after Malmö FF was founded. This was later changed to red and white striped shirts and black shorts to show that Malmö FF was a new, independent club. This colour combination has on occasion been used in modern times as the away kit. The present sky-blue kit was introduced in 1920. Since 2010 a small Scanian flag is featured on the back of the shirt just below the neck.

=== Crest evolution ===
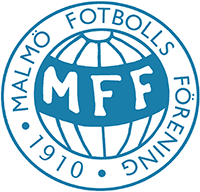
1910

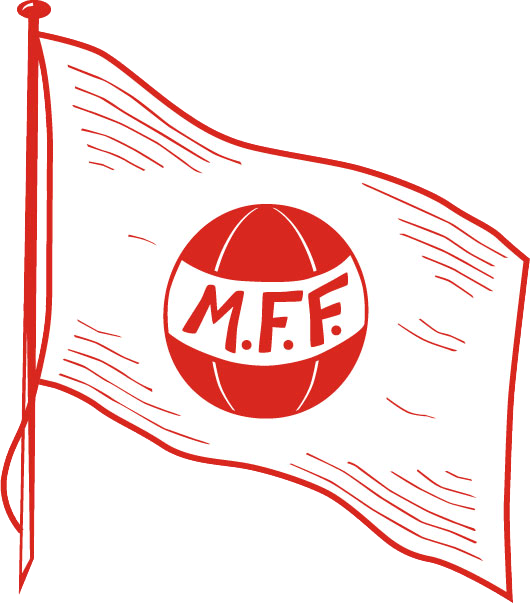
1920

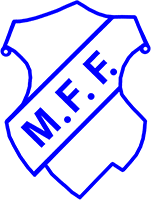
1920s

Current crest

The crest of Malmö FF consists of a shield with two vertical sky-blue fields on the sides, and one vertical white field in the middle. Underneath the shield is "Malmö FF" spelled out in sky-blue letters with a sky-blue star under the text. In the top area of the shield is a white horizontal field over the three vertical fields. The abbreviation of the club name "MFF" is spelled out with sky-blue letters in this field. On top of the shield are five tower-like extensions of the white field. The present shield crest made its debut on the shirt in the 1940s. There were other crests before this but they were never featured on the shirt. While the first crest was black and white, the second crest was red and white in accordance with the club's main colours between 1910 and 1920.

For the 100th anniversary of the club in 2010, the years 1910 and 2010 were featured on each side of the shield on a sky-blue ribbon behind the shield.

Malmö FF is the only Swedish club to wear two stars above its crest, representing at least 20 domestic championship titles. The stars are only featured on match shirts and are not part of the club's crest.

== Supporters ==
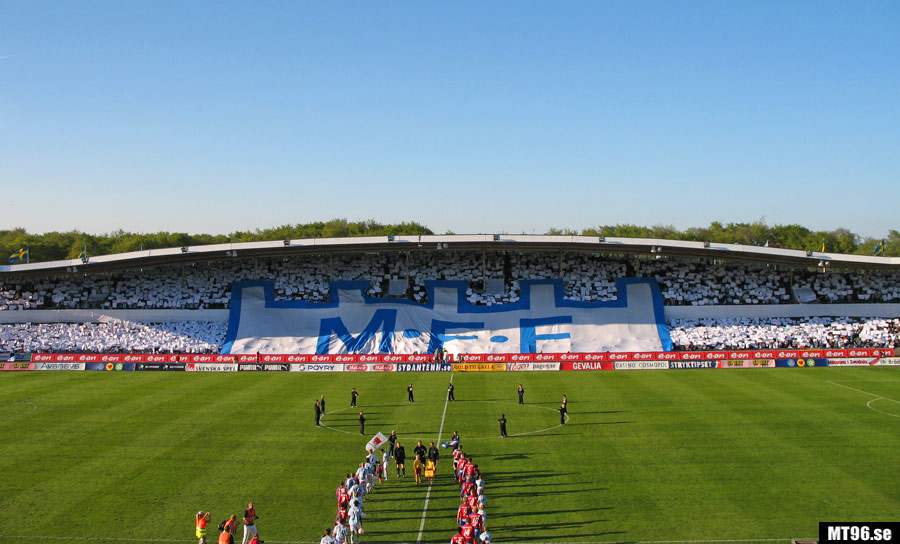
Tifo at former home stadium Malmö Stadion.

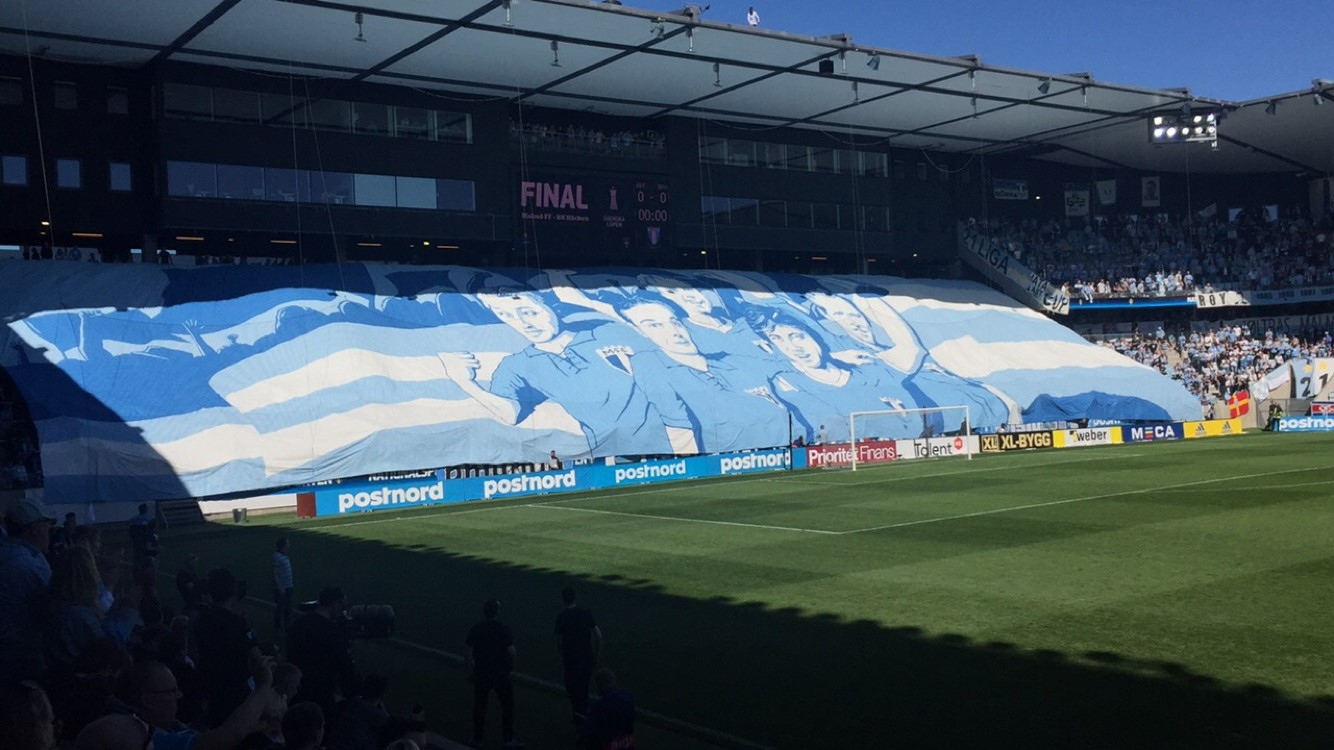
Tifo at the Swedish Cup final in 2016.

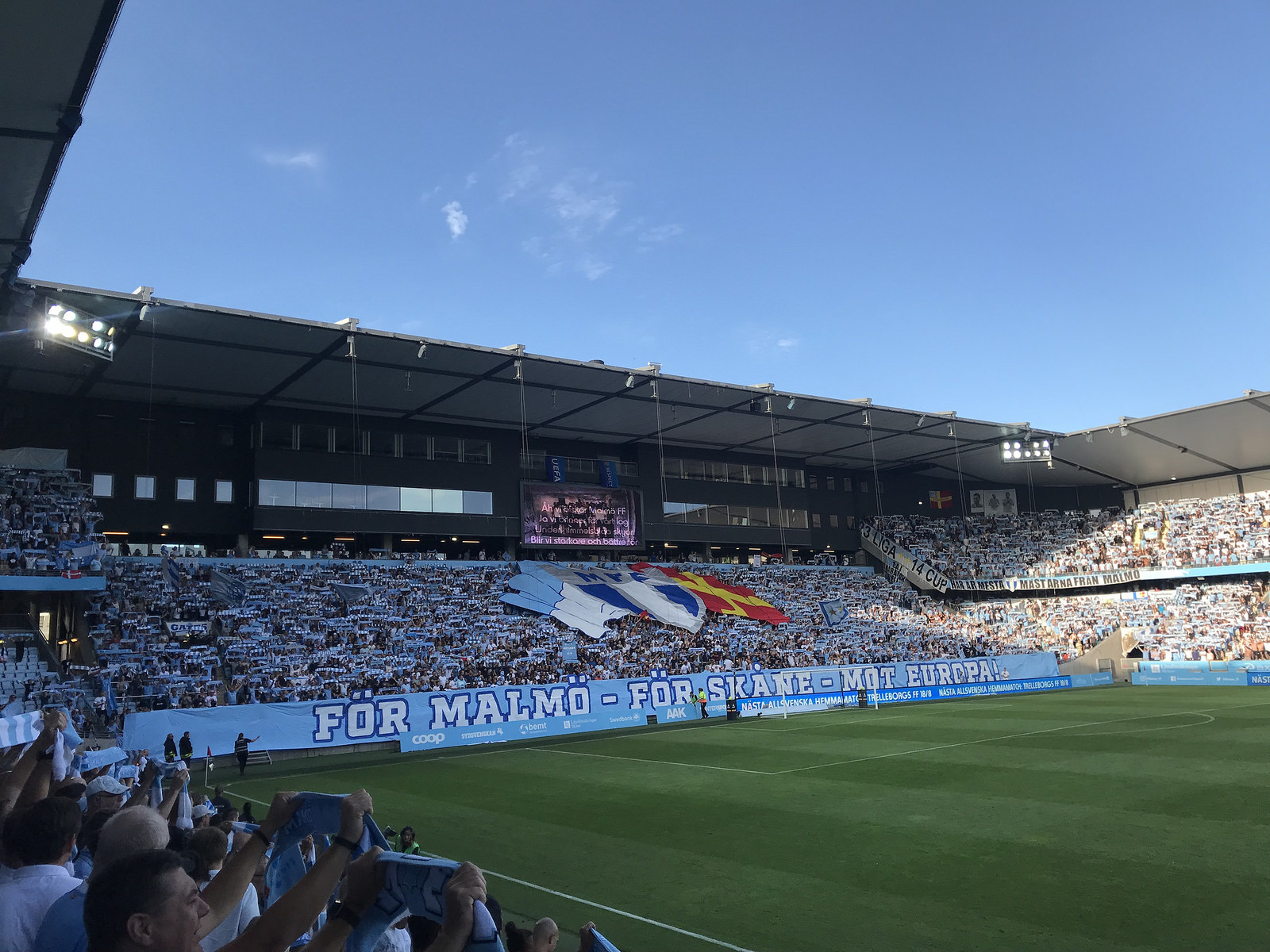
Tifo before a Champions League qualifier in 2018. The red and yellow flag is the Scanian flag.

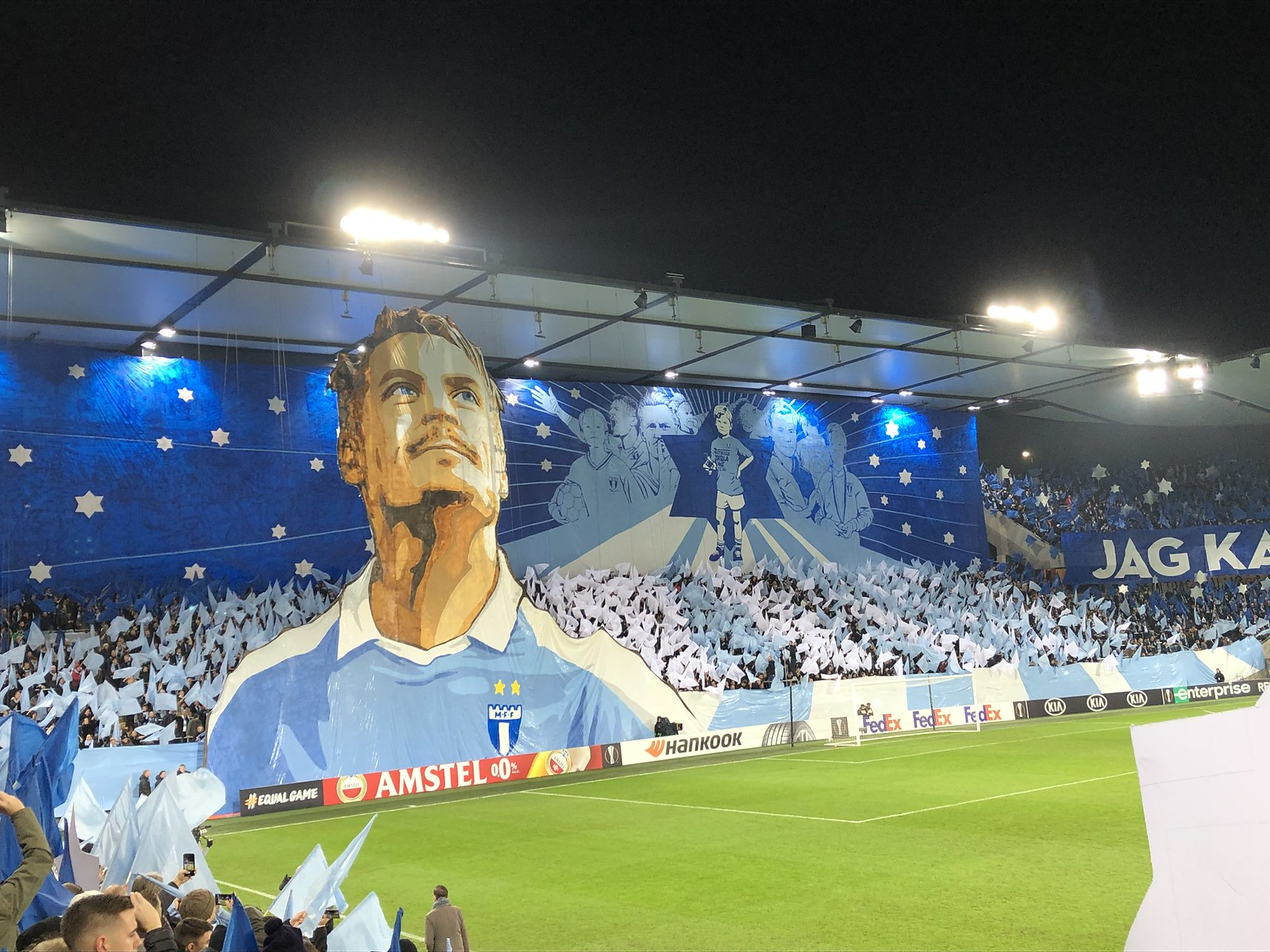
Tifo before Markus Rosenberg's final home game for Malmö FF in 2019.

Malmö FF has several fan clubs, of which the largest is the official fan club MFF Support, founded in 1992. MFF Support describes itself as "a non-profit and non-political organization working against violence and racism". The chairman of MFF Support is Thelma Ernst.

There are also several smaller independent supporter groups. The most prominent of these is Supras Malmö, which was founded in 2003 by a coalition of smaller ultras groups and devoted fans. The name "Supras" is derived from the words supporters and ultras – the latter indicating that the group is inspired by a fan culture with roots in southern Europe. Supras Malmö is the most visible group in the main supporter stand at Eleda Stadion, marking its presence with banners, flags and choreography. Another group with similar goals is Rex Scania. MFF Tifosi 96 (MT96) is a network of supporters creating tifos for special occasions and important games. Malmösystrar (Sisters of Malmö) is the largest female supporter faction in Europe with over 200 members.

Malmö FF supporters maintains a friendship with the supporters of Hertha BSC.

=== Rivalries ===
Because of geographical proximity, minor rivalries exist with Trelleborgs FF and Landskrona BoIS, which are both also located in Scania. The main rivals of the club are Helsingborgs IF, IFK Göteborg and IFK Malmö. The rivalry between Malmö FF and Helsingborgs IF has existed since Malmö FF were promoted up to Allsvenskan in the 1930s, and is primarily geographic, since both teams are from Scania in southern Sweden. The rivalry with IFK Göteborg relates more to title clashes; the two are the most successful clubs in Swedish football history and the only two to have appeared in European cup finals, IFK Göteborg in the UEFA Cup in 1982 and 1987 and Malmö FF in the European Cup in 1979.

During the 2000s, a rivalry between Malmö FF and FC Copenhagen has grown stronger. The rivalry is mainly about geographical proximity and the fact that the teams have played against each other more frequently. During a match in the Royal League in 2005 at Parken Stadium in Copenhagen, the meeting was given greater significance than before, this after Danish police, for unclear reasons, handed out blows with batons to Malmö supporters in the stands.

The rivalry with IFK Malmö is both geographical and historical. The two clubs come from the same city and used to play at the same stadium in the early 20th century. The supposed actions of board members of IFK Malmö in 1933, revealing Malmö FF's breaches of amateur football rules to the Swedish Football Association, further contribute to the competitive tensions between the two clubs. IFK Malmö have not played in Allsvenskan since 1962; thus matches between the two sides are rare.

=== Average attendances ===
As of 15 December 2024

Malmö FF are well known for their large average attendance. Average attendances at Malmö FF's home matches in Allsvenskan and European competitions for the last ten seasons running.

Allsvenskan 2010–2025
Season	Stadium	Capacity	Total	High	Low	Average	Occupancy	Median
2010	Eleda Stadion	24,000	227,904	24,148	9,346	15,194 ▲	63.3%	14,149
2011	Eleda Stadion	24,000	185,825	23,612	6,715	12,388 ▼	51.6%	11,333
2012	Eleda Stadion	24,000	221,981	23,638	10,088	14,799 ▲	61.7%	14,583
2013	Eleda Stadion	24,000	241,395	23,758	9,837	16,093 ▲	67.1%	15,560
2014	Eleda Stadion	24,000	211,357	20,310	9,336	14,090 ▼	58.7%	13,382
2015	Eleda Stadion	22,500	259,973	22,337	12,862	17,332 ▲	77.0%	16,215
2016	Eleda Stadion	22,500	267,622	21,719	13,747	17,841 ▲	79.3%	17,526
2017	Eleda Stadion	22,500	273,807	21,354	14,482	18,254 ▲	81.1%	18,830
2018	Eleda Stadion	22,500	223,822	20,072	11,237	14,921 ▼	66.3%	14,745
2019	Eleda Stadion	22,500	248,496	21,812	11,521	16,566 ▲	73.6%	16,267
2020	Eleda Stadion	22,500	0	0	0	0	0%	0
2021	Eleda Stadion	22,500	108,115	21,067	0	7,208 ▲	32.0%	5,113
2022	Eleda Stadion	22,500	261,156	20,231	13,312	17,410 ▲	77.4%	17,052
2023	Eleda Stadion	22,500	301,126	21,612	17,116	20,075 ▲	89.2%	20,231
2024	Eleda Stadion	22,500	304,320	21,576	19,173	20,288 ▲	90.2%	20,118
2025	Eleda Stadion	22,500	279,938	21,269	15,226	18,662 ▼	82.9%	18,676

European Competitions 2010–2022
Season	Competition	Capacity	Matches	Total	High	Low	Average
2011–12	UEFA Champions League	20,500	3	46,916	19,084	12,501	15,639
2011–12	UEFA Europa League	20,500	3	26,900	10,802	7,632	8,967
2013–14	UEFA Europa League	20,500	3	25,855	11,538	5,689	8,618
2014–15	UEFA Champions League	20,500	6	110,014	20,500	8,831	18,336
2015–16	UEFA Champions League	20,500	6	113,958	20,500	12,436	18,993
2017–18	UEFA Champions League	20,500	1	20,058	20,058	20,058	20,058
2018–19	UEFA Champions League	20,500	3	45,985	18,153	10,623	15,328
2018–19	UEFA Europa League	20,500	5	82,692	20,312	11,487	16,538
2019–20	UEFA Europa League	20,500	8	125,471	20,500	8,667	15,684
2020–21	UEFA Europa League	20,500	3	0	0	0	0
2021–22	UEFA Champions League	20,500	7	61,522	19,551	4,012	8,789
2022–23	UEFA Champions League	20,500	2	29,064	17,234	11,830	14,532
2022–23	UEFA Europa League	20,500	5	64,029	16,057	10,912	12,806
2024–25	UEFA Champions League	20,500	3	57,679	20,589	18,432	19,226

== Stadium ==
Malmö FF's first stadium was Malmö IP, which was shared with arch-rivals IFK Malmö. The team played here from the founding of the club in 1910, until 1958. The stadium still exists today, albeit with lower capacity, and is now used by women's team FC Rosengård, who were previously the women's section of Malmö FF. Capacity in 2012 is 7,600, but attendances were usually much higher when Malmö FF played there. For the last season in 1957, the average attendance was 15,500. The club's record attendance at Malmö IP is 22,436 against Helsingborgs IF on 1 June 1956. The stadium is still considered a key part of the club's history, as it was here that the club were founded, played their first 47 seasons, and won five Swedish championships.

A new stadium was constructed in Malmö after Sweden was awarded the 1958 FIFA World Cup – this saw the birth of Malmö Stadion. Malmö FF played their first season at the stadium in 1958. The first time the club won the Swedish championship at the stadium was in 1965. An upper tier was added to the stadium in 1992. The club enjoyed the most successful era of their history at this stadium, winning ten out of twenty Swedish championships while based there. The stadium originally had a capacity of 30,000 but this was lowered to 27,500 due to changes in safety regulations. The club's record attendance at the stadium was 29,328 against Helsingborgs IF on 24 September 1967.

Following the 2004 victory in Allsvenskan, plans were made to construct a new stadium. In July 2005, Malmö FF announced that work was to begin on Eleda Stadion, designed for 18,000 seated spectators and 6,000 standing. The stadium can also accommodate 21,000 as an all-seater for international and European games in which terracing is not allowed. Construction started in 2007 and was finished in 2009. The new stadium is located next to Malmö Stadion. Although there was still small-scale construction going on around the stadium at the time, the stadium was inaugurated on 13 April 2009 with the first home game of the 2009 season against Örgryte IS; Malmö FF's Labinot Harbuzi scored the inaugural goal in the 61st minute. The first Swedish championship won at the stadium occurred in 2010, when the club beat Mjällby AIF on 7 November in the final game of the season 2–0. Attendance at this game set the stadium record of 24,148. Stadion is a UEFA category 4 rated stadium.

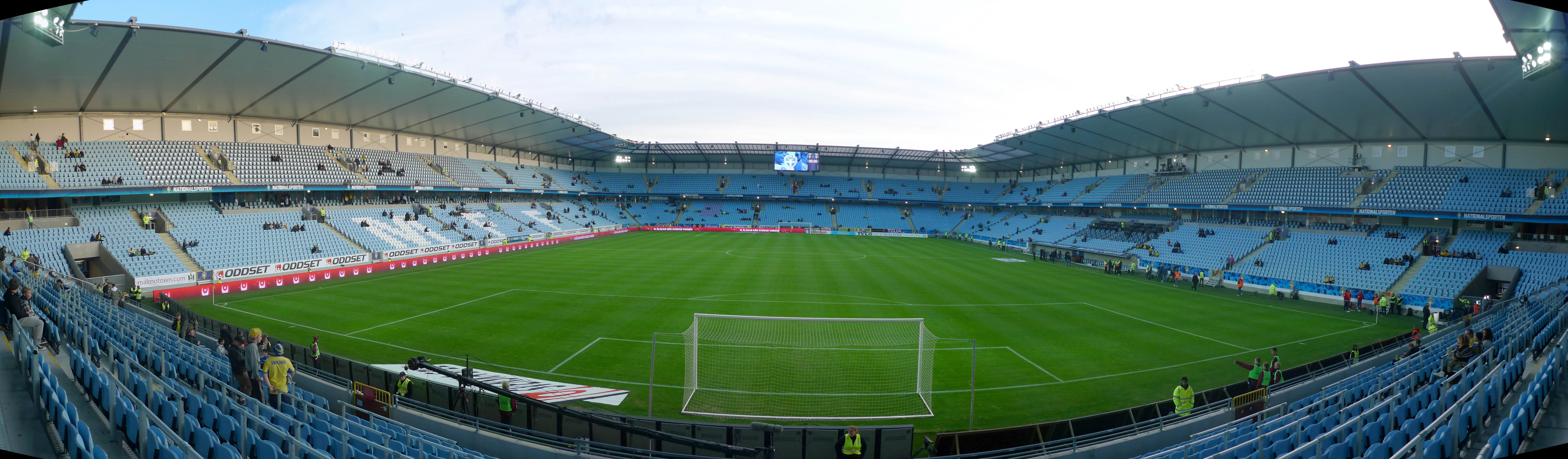
A panorama of Stadion from the Northern Stand, showing from left to right the Eastern Stand, the Southern Stand and the Western Stand
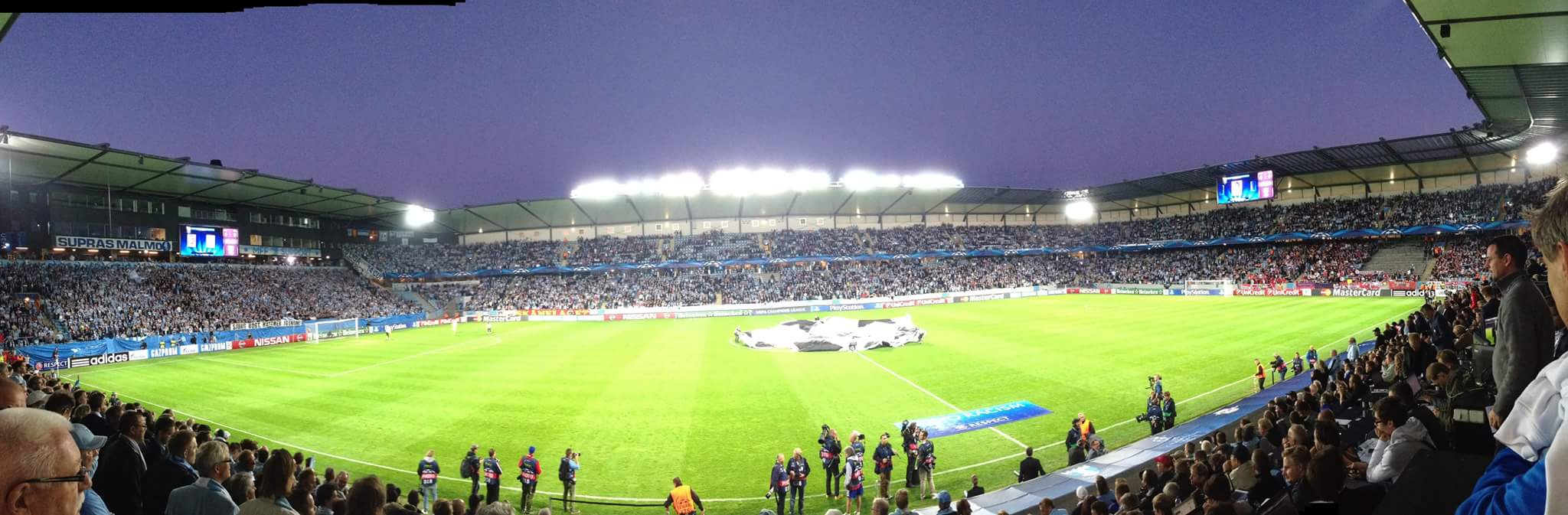
Stadion from the Western stand before a UEFA Champions League play-off game against FC Red Bull Salzburg in 2014

== European record ==
Malmö FF has a rich European legacy with participation in UEFA competitions since 1964. The club's best European performance was in the 1978–79 season, when they reached the final of the UEFA Champions League (then European Champion Clubs' Cup), where they were beaten 0–1 by English Champions Nottingham Forest. This makes Malmö FF the only Nordic club to have reached this far in the European Cup or Champions League. Malmö FF is also the only Nordic club to have been represented at the Intercontinental Cup (succeeded by FIFA Club World Cup) in which they competed for the 1979 title. Malmö FF is one of the four Swedish clubs to have participated in the UEFA Champions League group stages, along with IFK Göteborg, AIK, and Helsingborg.

=== Overall record by competition ===
Tournament	S	Pld	W	D	L	GF	GA	GD
European Champion Clubs' Cup / UEFA Champions League	19	95	32	23	40	103	148	−45
UEFA Cup / UEFA Europa League	17	80	34	15	31	122	97	+25
Cup Winners' Cup	5	22	9	7	6	35	18	+17
Inter-Cities Fairs Cup	4	8	0	1	7	4	23	−19
UEFA Intertoto Cup	1	2	0	0	2	1	4	−3
Intercontinental Cup / FIFA Club World Cup	1	2	0	0	2	1	3	−2
Total	45	197	70	43	83	247	273	−26

=== UEFA Coefficient ===
Correct as of 14 June 2024. The table shows the position of Malmö FF (highlighted), based on their UEFA coefficient club ranking for 2024, and the four clubs which are closest to Malmö FF's position (the two clubs with the higher coefficient and the two with the lower coefficient).

2024	2023	Mvmt.	Club	2019–20	2020–21	2021–22	2022–23	2023–24	2024 Coeff.
86	83	−3	(Poland) Lech Poznań		3.00		14.00	2.00	19.000
87	103	+16	(Ukraine) Zorya Luhansk	2.50	4.00	5.00	2.00	5.00	18.500
87	63	−24	(Sweden) Malmö FF	8.00	2.50	5.00	1.50		18.500
89	102	+13	(Italy) Torino FC	2.50					18.056
60	134	+74	(Poland) Legia Warsaw	2.50	2.50	4.00		9.00	18.000

== Ownership and finances ==
Malmö FF made the transition from an amateur club to fully professional in the late 1970s under the leadership of club chairman Eric Persson. The club is an open member association, and the annual general meeting is the highest policy-making body where each member has one vote, therefore no shares are issued. The meeting approves the accounts, votes to elect the chairman and the board, and decides on incoming motions. During the successful 2010's era Håkan Jeppsson was the chairman after taking over after Bengt Madsen in 2010, prior to his sudden death in 2018. The club's legal status means that any interest claims are made to the club and not to the board of directors or club members. Daily operations are run by a managing director who liaises with the chairman.

With an equity of 497 million SEK the club is the richest football club in Sweden as of 2019. The turnover for 2018 was 343 million SEK. The highest transfer fee received by Malmö FF for a player was 86.2 million SEK (€8.7 million at that time) for Zlatan Ibrahimović who was sold to Ajax in 2001. At the time, this was the highest transfer fee ever paid to a Swedish football club.

The main sponsors of Malmö FF are Volkswagen, Elitfönster AB, Intersport, Imtech, JMS Mediasystem, Mercedes-Benz, SOVA and Svenska Spel. The club also had a naming rights deal with Swedbank regarding the name of Eleda Stadion between 2007 and 2017 when it was called Swedbank Stadion.

== Media coverage ==
Malmö FF have been the subject of several films. Some examples are Swedish football documentaries Blådårar 1 and Blådårar 2, which portray the club from both supporter and player perspectives during the 1997 and 2000 seasons. Blådårar 1 is set in 1997, when the club finished third in Allsvenskan. The film focuses on devoted fan Lasse, player Anders Andersson, former chairman Hans Cavalli-Björkman and other individuals. Blådårar 2 is set in 2000, the year after the club had been relegated to Superettan, and follows the team as they fight for Malmö FF's return to Allsvenskan. The second film continues to follow Lasse, but also has a significant focus on Zlatan Ibrahimović, his progress and how he was eventually sold to AFC Ajax during the 2001 season.

The club have also been featured in Mitt Hjärtas Malmö, a series of documentaries covering the history of Malmö. Clips used included match footage from the 1940s (Volume 7), and match footage from the 1979 European Cup Final in Munich from a fan's perspective (Volume 8). Volume 9 of the series is devoted entirely to coverage of the club's 100th anniversary in 2010.

In the 2005 Swedish drama movie Om Sara, actor Alexander Skarsgård plays the fictional football star Kalle Öberg, who plays for Malmö FF. Finally, a recurring sketch in the second season of the comedy sketch show Hipphipp! involved a group of Malmö FF fans singing and chanting while performing everyday tasks, such as shopping or operating an ATM.

== Players ==
=== Current squad ===
As of 8 September 2026

Note: Flags indicate national team as defined under FIFA eligibility rules; some limited exceptions apply. Players may hold more than one non-FIFA nationality.

No.	Pos.	Nation	Player
1	GK	SWE	Robin Olsen
2	DF	NOR	Stian Gregersen
4	DF	KOS	Bleon Kurtulus
5	DF	MNE	Andrej Đurić
6	MF	BUL	Yanis Karabelyov
7	MF	SWE	Otto Rosengren
9	FW	ESP	Diego García
10	MF	DEN	Anders Christiansen (captain)
11	FW	SWE	Emmanuel Ekong
14	DF	NOR	Warren Kamanzi
15	FW	SWE	Mayckel Lahdo
17	DF	DEN	Jens Stryger
18	DF	SWE	Pontus Jansson
23	DF	SWE	Noah John
24	MF	SWE	Oscar Sjöstrand
25	DF	BRA	Gabriel Busanello
27	GK	SWE	Johan Dahlin

No.	Pos.	Nation	Player
28	MF	SRB	Jovan Milosavljević
29	FW	MNE	Sead Hakšabanović
32	FW	ISL	Daníel Guðjohnsen
33	FW	MNE	Omar Krajina
37	DF	SWE	Adrian Skogmar
39	FW	GHA	Isaac Assibu
40	MF	BIH	Kenan Busuladžić
42	MF	SWE	Viggo Jeppsson
43	MF	SWE	Gentian Lajqi
44	DF	SWE	Malte Frejd
45	MF	SWE	Anton Höög
46	MF	CRO	Antonio Palac
47	MF	SWE	Theodor Lundbergh
50	GK	SWE	William Nieroth
—	DF	GHA	Israel Anum
—	MF	KOS	Medjen Llumnica

=== Out on loan ===
As of 8 September 2026

Note: Flags indicate national team as defined under FIFA eligibility rules; some limited exceptions apply. Players may hold more than one non-FIFA nationality.

No.	Pos.	Nation	Player
34	MF	SWE	Zakaria Loukili (to Landskrona BoIS until 31 December 2026)
50	GK	SWE	Joakim Persson (to BK Olympic until 31 December 2026)
—	DF	DEN	Sashwat Rana (to Hellerup IK until 30 June 2027)
—	DF	SWE	William Åkesson (to Landskrona BoIS until 31 December 2026)

No.	Pos.	Nation	Player
—	MF	SWE	Viggo Karlsson (to Trelleborgs FF until 31 December 2026)
—	MF	GUI	Salifou Soumah (to Panetolikos until 30 June 2027)
—	FW	GHA	Yassin Mohammed (to Jong Gent until 30 June 2027)

=== Retired numbers ===
12 – MFF Support

=== Notable players ===
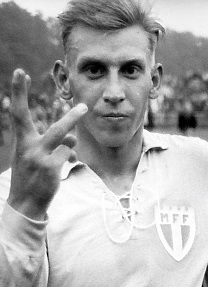
Bo Larsson is Malmö FF's all-time leading goalscorer in Allsvenskan with 119 goals in 302 matches.

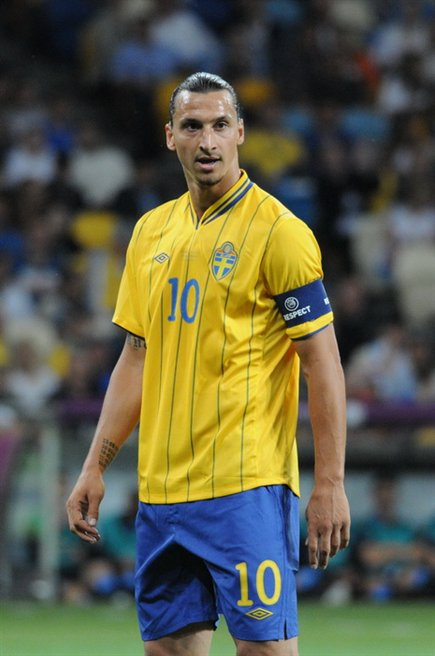
Zlatan Ibrahimović started his professional career at Malmö FF. He made 40 league appearances and scored 16 goals for the club between 1999 and 2001.

List criteria:

- player has made more than 500 appearances overall for the club, or
- player has won Guldbollen, an official UEFA or FIFA award, or
- player has been picked as one of the 11 best players in the official hall of fame Sydsvenskan team that was selected by the newspapers readers for the club's 100th anniversary in 2010.

Name	Nationality	Malmö FF career	Total appearances	Total goals	Guldbollen	UEFA/FIFA Award	Sydsvenskan team
Erik Nilsson	Sweden	1934–1953	600	4	1950		
Helge Bengtsson	Sweden	1934–1951	501	3			
Prawitz Öberg	Sweden	1952–1965	515	103	1962		
Ingvar Svahn	Sweden	1957–1968; 1970	414	161	1967		
Bo Larsson	Sweden	1962–1966; 1969–1979	546	289	1965; 1973		Yes
Krister Kristensson	Sweden	1963–1979	626	16			Yes
Roy Andersson	Sweden	1968–1983	624	49	1977		Yes
Roland Andersson	Sweden	1968–1974; 1977–1983	564	13			
Jan Möller	Sweden	1971–1980; 1984–1988	591	1	1979		Yes
Ingemar Erlandsson	Sweden	1976–1987	473	46			Yes
Magnus Andersson	Sweden	1975–1988	568	28			
Robert Prytz	Sweden	1977–1982; 1993–1995	132	36	1986		Yes
Torbjörn Persson	Sweden	1980–1995	574	39			
Jonnie Fedel	Sweden	1984–2001	588	1			
Jonas Thern	Sweden	1985–1987; 1988–1989	160	30	1989		Yes
Martin Dahlin	Sweden	1987–1991	176	83	1993		Yes
Stefan Schwarz	Sweden	1987–1991	103	7	1999		Yes
Patrik Andersson	Sweden	1989–1992; 2004–2005	184	24	1995; 2001	UEFA Team of the Year; 2001	Yes
Zlatan Ibrahimović	Sweden	1999–2001	69	16	2005; 2007–2016	UEFA Team of the Year; 2007; 2009; 2013; 2014; FIFPro World XI; 2013; FIFA Puskás Award; 2013	Yes
Jari Litmanen	Finland	2005–2007	18	6		UEFA Jubilee Awards	
Emil Forsberg	Sweden	2013–2014	57	19	2021		

== Management ==
=== Organisation ===
As of 6th March 2026

Name	Role
(Sweden) Zlatko Rihter	President
(Sweden) Jimmy Rosengren	Chief executive officer
(Sweden) Pontus Hansson	Secretary
(Sweden) Daniel Andersson	Head of football
(Sweden) Philip Berglund	Sporting director
(Sweden) Anne-Maj Jansson	Sporting assistant
(Sweden) Jeffrey Aubynn	Head of scouting
(Sweden) Alf Westerberg	Sporting co-ordinator
(Sweden) Per Ågren	Sporting director (youth)
(Denmark) Lars Hallengreen	Chief scout (youth)

=== Technical staff ===
As of 30 June 2026

Name	Role
(Norway) Gaute Helstrup	Head coach
(Norway) Aasmund Bjørkan	Assistant coaches
(Sweden) Guillermo Molins	Assistant coaches
(Sweden) Ola Toivonen	Loan manager
(England) Mark Piros-Read	Fitness coaches
(England) Matt Umney	Fitness coaches
(England) Aidan Spurling	Fitness coaches
(Sweden) Zlatan Azinovic	Goalkeeping coach
(Sweden) Jesper Robertsson	Physiotherapists
(Sweden) Roem Muftee	Physiotherapists
(Sweden) Johan Ahlberg	Physiotherapists
(Sweden) Igor Zindovic	Club doctor
(Sweden) Andreas Omidfar	Club doctor
(Sweden) Sebastian Leyton	Club masseur
(Sweden) David Björkman	Naprapat
(Sweden) Greger Andrijevski	Nutritionist
(Sweden) Sverker Fryklund	Psychologist
(Sweden) Daniel Möller	Equipment manager

=== Notable coaches ===
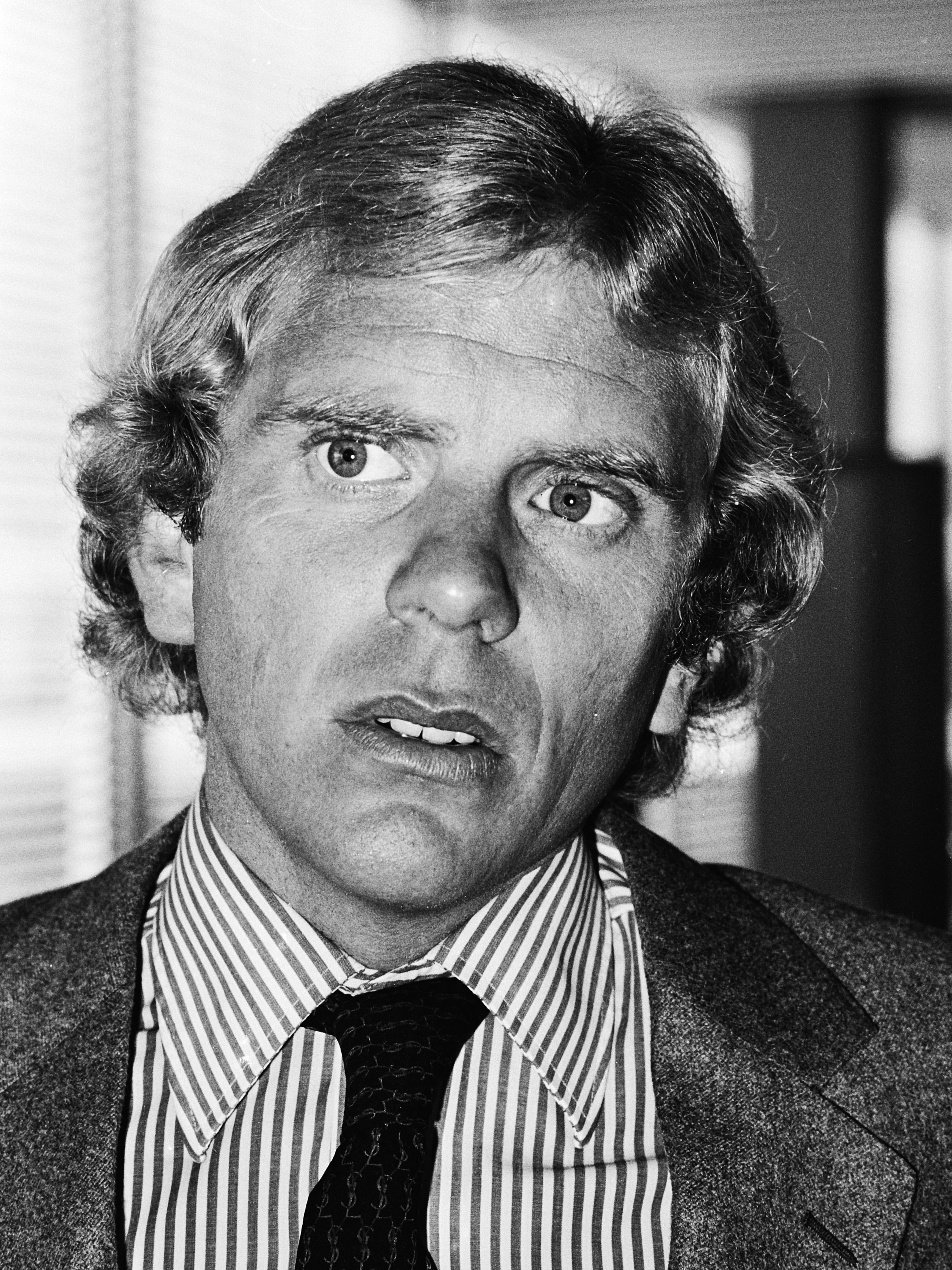
Bob Houghton won three Swedish championships, four Svenska Cupen titles and reached the 1979 European Cup Final during his time in Malmö.

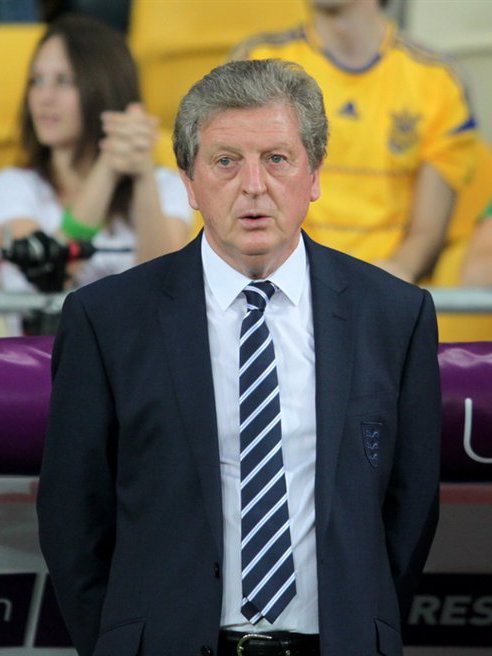
Roy Hodgson won five consecutive Allsvenskan titles and two Svenska Cupen titles during his five years at the club. He is pictured in 2012 as head coach of England.

This is a list of coaches who have won one or more titles at the club

Name	Years	Allsvenskan	Svenska Cupen
(Sweden) Sven Nilsson	1944; 1945–1946; 1950	1943–44; 1949–50	1944; 1946
(Hungary) Kálmán Konrád	1947–1949	1948–49	1947
(Wales) Bert Turner	1951–1954	1950–51; 1952–53	1951; 1953
(Spain) Antonio Durán	1964–1971	1965; 1967; 1970; 1971	1967
(Sweden) Karl-Erik Hult	1972–1973		1972–73
(England) Bob Houghton	1974–1980; 1990–1992	1974; 1975; 1977	1973–74; 1974–75; 1977–78; 1979–80
(Sweden) Tord Grip	1983–1984		1983–84
(England) Roy Hodgson	1985–1989	1985; 1986; 1987; 1988; 1989	1985–86; 1988–89
(Sweden) Tom Prahl	2002–2005	2004	
(Sweden) Roland Nilsson	2008–2011	2010	
(Sweden) Rikard Norling	2011–2013	2013	
(Norway) Åge Hareide	2014–2015	2014	
(Denmark) Allan Kuhn	2016	2016	
(Sweden) Magnus Pehrsson	2017–2018	2017	
(Denmark) Jon Dahl Tomasson	2020–2021	2020; 2021	
(Serbia) Miloš Milojević	2022		2021–22
(Sweden) Henrik Rydström	2023–2025	2023; 2024	2023–24

== Statistics ==
Malmö FF have played 86 seasons in Allsvenskan. The only clubs to have played more seasons are AIK with 93 and IFK Göteborg with 89 (2021). The club are also the leaders of the all-time Allsvenskan table since the end of the 2012 season. They are the only Nordic club to have played a European Cup final, present day UEFA Champions League, having reached the 1979 European Cup Final. Malmö FF is also the only Nordic club to have been represented at the Intercontinental Cup (succeeded by FIFA Club World Cup) in which they competed for the 1979 title.

== Honours ==
Malmö FF have won domestic honours. The club currently holds the records for most Swedish championships, Allsvenskan and Svenska Cupen titles. The club's most recent honour was in 2023 when they won Allsvenskan. The club first played in Europe for the 1964–65 European season in the European Cup, and most recently in the 2021–22 European season in the group stage for the UEFA Champions League. Including the qualification stages, they have participated in the European Cup and UEFA Champions League eighteen times and in the UEFA Cup and UEFA Europa League seventeen times. The club have also played in other now defunct European competitions such as the UEFA Cup Winners' Cup and the UEFA Intertoto Cup.

=== Domestic ===
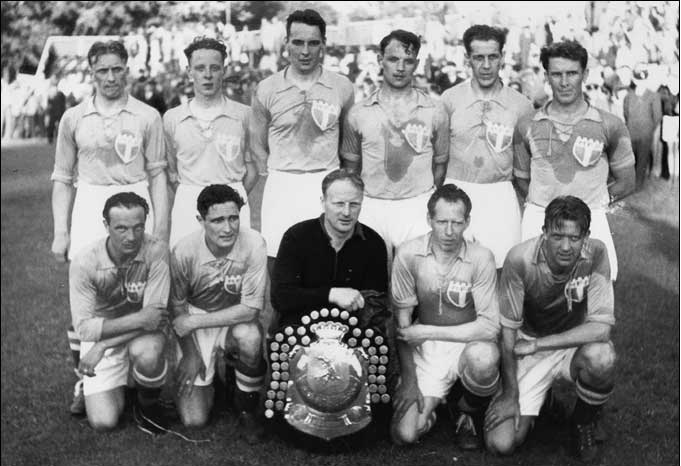
The Malmö FF team of 1948–49

- Swedish Champions
  - Winners (24): 1943–44, 1948–49, 1949–50, 1950–51, 1952–53, 1965, 1967, 1970, 1971, 1974, 1975, 1977, 1986, 1988, 2004, 2010, 2013, 2014, 2016, 2017, 2020, 2021, 2023, 2024

==== League ====
- Allsvenskan (Tier 1)
  - Winners (27): 1943–44, 1948–49, 1949–50, 1950–51, 1952–53, 1965, 1967, 1970, 1971, 1974, 1975, 1977, 1985, 1986, 1987, 1988, 1989, 2004, 2010, 2013, 2014, 2016, 2017, 2020, 2021, 2023, 2024
  - Runners-up (15): 1945–46, 1947–48, 1951–52, 1955–56, 1956–57, 1964, 1968, 1969, 1976, 1978, 1980, 1983, 1996, 2002, 2019
- Division 2 Sydsvenska Serien (Tier 2)
  - Winners (1): 1920–21
  - Runners-up (1): 1923–24
- Division 2 Södra (Tier 2)
  - Winners (3): 1930–31, 1934–35, 1935–36
  - Runners-up (1): 1929–30
- Superettan (Tier 2)
  - Runners-up (1): 2000

==== Cups ====
- Svenska Cupen
  - Winners (16): 1944, 1946, 1947, 1951, 1953, 1967, 1972–73, 1973–74, 1974–75, 1977–78, 1979–80, 1983–84, 1985–86, 1988–89, 2021–22, 2023–24
  - Runners-up (7): 1945, 1970–71, 1995–96, 2015–16, 2017–18, 2019–20, 2024–25
- Allsvenskan play-offs
  - Winners (2): 1986, 1988
  - Runners-up (2): 1987, 1989
- Svenska Supercupen
  - Winners (2): 2013, 2014
  - Runners-up (1): 2011

=== European ===
- European Cup (Champions League)
  - Runners-up (1): 1978–79

=== Worldwide ===
- Intercontinental Cup
  - Runners-up (1): 1979

=== Doubles ===
- Allsvenskan and Svenska Cupen
  - Winners (9): 1943–44, 1950–51, 1952–53, 1967, 1974, 1975, 1986, 1989, 2024

== Footnotes ==
Awards
Preceded by Björn Borg and Ingemar Stenmark	Svenska Dagbladet Gold Medal; 1979	Succeeded by Thomas Wassberg
