= List of Malmö FF players =

This list is about Malmö FF players with at least 100 league appearances. For a list of all Malmö FF players with a Wikipedia article, see Category:Malmö FF players. For the current Malmö FF first-team squad, see First-team squad.

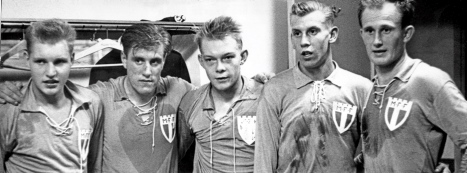
Part of Malmö FF's first team squad in 1962, from left to right; Jan Jeppsson, Rolf Eriksson, Lars Granström, Bo Larsson and Ingvar Svahn

Malmö Fotbollförening, also known simply as Malmö FF, is a Swedish professional association football club based in Malmö. The club is affiliated with Skånes Fotbollförbund (The Scanian Football Association), and plays its home games at Stadion. Formed on 24 February 1910, Malmö FF is the most successful club in Sweden in terms of trophies won. The club have won the most league titles of any Swedish club with twenty-one, a joint record eighteen Swedish championship titles and a record fourteen national cup titles. (Note: The title of "Swedish Champions" has been awarded to the winner of four different competitions over the years. Between 1896 and 1925 the title was awarded to the winner of Svenska Mästerskapet, a stand-alone cup tournament. No club were given the title between 1926 and 1930 even though the first-tier league Allsvenskan was played. In 1931 the title was reinstated and awarded to the winner of Allsvenskan. Between 1982 and 1990 a play-off in cup format was held at the end of the league season to decide the champions. After the play-off format in 1991 and 1992 the title was decided by the winner of Mästerskapsserien, an additional league after the end of Allsvenskan. Since the 1993 season the title has once again been awarded to the winner of Allsvenskan.) The team competes in Allsvenskan as of the 2015 season; this is Malmö FF's 15th consecutive season in the top flight, and their 80th overall. The main rivals of the club are Helsingborgs IF, IFK Göteborg and, historically, IFK Malmö. Since playing their first competitive match, more than 480 players have made a league appearance for the club, of whom 90 players have made at least 100 appearances; those players are listed here.

Defender Krister Kristensson is the player with the most league appearances in the club's history, having made 348 appearances between 1963 and 1978, scoring seven goals. Kristensson also played for the Sweden men's national football team, and ended his career with 38 international caps. Forward Hans Håkansson is the player who has scored the most goals in league matches for Malmö FF, with 163 goals in 192 matches; Bo Larsson holds the record of most goals scored in Allsvenskan with 119 goals in the league.

== Key ==
General

- League appearances and goals are for first-team competitive league matches only, including Allsvenskan, Svenska Serien, Superettan and Division 2 matches. Substitute appearances included. Total appearances and goals are for first-team matches only, including all competitive and friendly matches.
- Players are listed according to the total number of league games played, the player with the most goals scored is ranked higher if two or more players are tied.
- Positions are listed according to the tactical formations that were employed at the time. Thus the change in the names of defensive and midfield reflects the tactical evolution that occurred from the 1960s onwards. The year 1960 is used as a breaking point in this list for the use of names of defensive and midfield positions.

Table headers

- Nationality – If a player played international football, the country/countries he played for are shown. Otherwise, the player's nationality is given as their country of birth.
- Malmö FF career – The year of the player's first appearance for Malmö FF to the year of his last appearance.
- League appearances – The number of games played in league competition.
- League goals – The number of goals scored in league competition.
- Total appearances – The number of games played in all games for the club including friendlies.
- Total goals – The number of goals scored in all games for the club including friendlies.

Positions key
| Pre-1960 | | Post-1960 | |
|---|---|---|---|
| GK | Goalkeeper | | |
| FB | Full back | DF | Defender |
| HB | Half back | MF | Midfielder |
| FW | Forward | | |
| U | Utility player | | |

Symbols key
| Symbol | Meaning |
|---|---|
| ‡ | Malmö FF player in the 2026 season |
| * | Player holds club record(s) |

== Players ==
Statistics correct as of match played 14 December 2019. (Note: For up to date statistics and referencing for current Malmö FF players on this list, see the statistics section at svenskfotboll.se: click on the relevant player's name there to verify that the statistics displayed on this list are correct. For players who are no longer part of the squad, but who played in Malmö FF after 2010, see www.soccerway.com, and enter the player's name into the search field in the upper-right-hand corner and press enter to verify the player's statistics.)

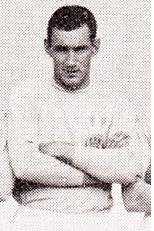
Krister Kristensson made over 300 league appearances for Malmö FF, more than any other player.

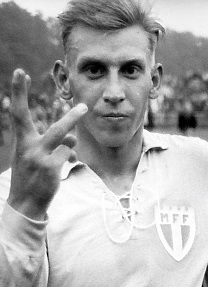
Bo Larsson made the fourth-highest number of league appearances for Malmö FF.

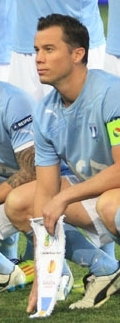
Daniel Andersson played for Malmö FF 292 times over 15 seasons.

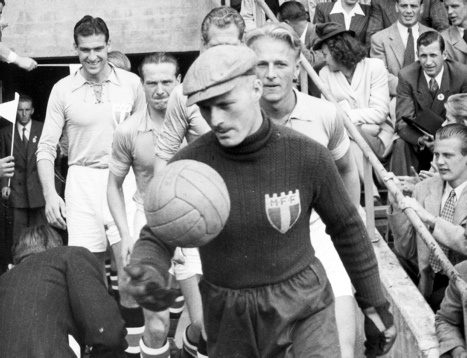
Helge Bengtsson was Malmö FF's first choice goalkeeper during the team's undefeated run of 49 league matches between 1949 and 1951.

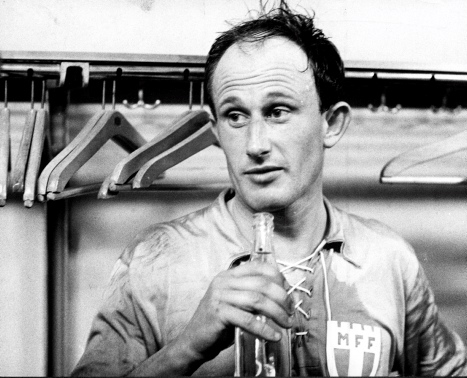
Ingvar Svahn was neither booked nor sent off for ten of his twelve seasons with Malmö FF.

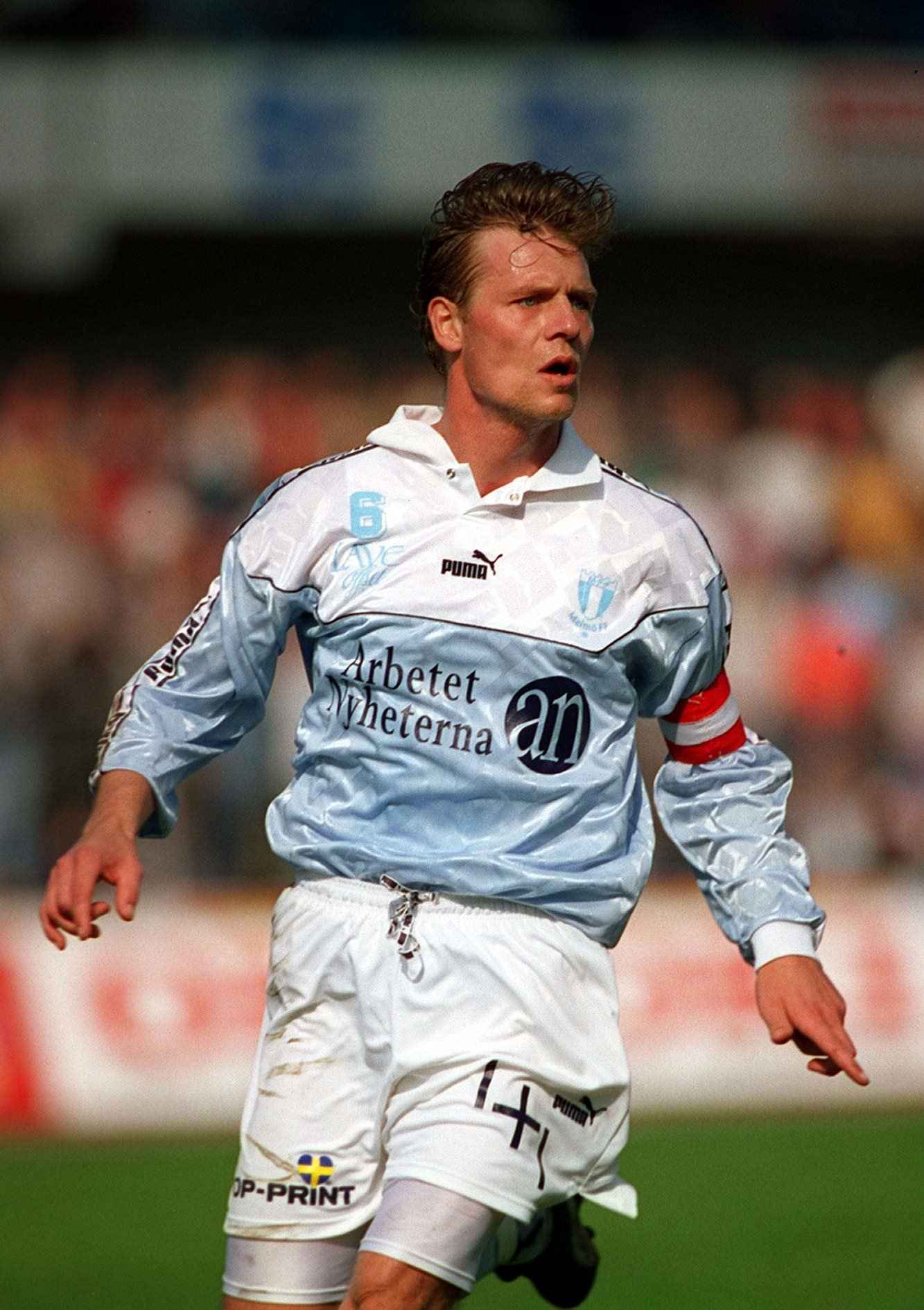
Niklas Nyhlén made 205 appearances for Malmö FF between 1987 and 1996.

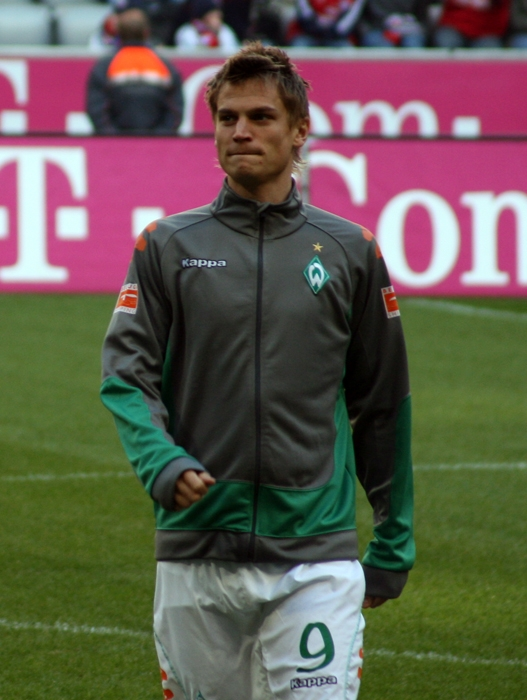
Markus Rosenberg has made 181 appearances and scored 62 goals for Malmö FF between 2001 and 2005 and since joining the club again in 2014.

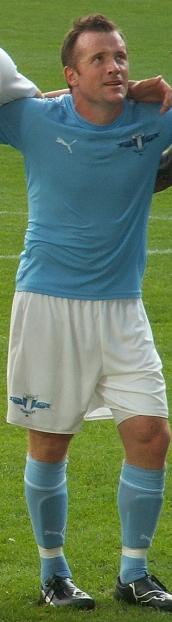
Ulrich Vinzents, from Denmark, is the foreign player with the most league appearances for Malmö FF.

List of Malmö FF players with at least 100 league appearances
| Name | Nationality | Position | Malmö FF career | League appearances | League goals | Total appearances | Total goals |
|---|---|---|---|---|---|---|---|
| Krister Kristensson (Note: Krister Kristensson holds the club records for most league appearances and most appearances in total.) * | Sweden | DF | 1963–1978 | 348 | 7 | 626 | 16 |
| Erik Nilsson | Sweden | FB | 1934–1953 | 326 | 1 | 600 | 4 |
| Roy Andersson | Sweden | DF | 1968–1983 | 317 | 21 | 624 | 49 |
| Bo Larsson (Note: Bo Larsson holds the club records for most Allsvenskan goals scored and most goals scored in one Allsvenskan season.) * | Sweden | U | 1962–1966; 1969–1979 | 302 | 119 | 546 | 289 |
| Roland Andersson | Sweden | DF | 1968–1974; 1977–1983 | 299 | 6 | 564 | 13 |
| Jan Möller (Note: Jan Möller holds the club and Allsvenskan records for most Allsvenskan medals won with 14 medals, Möller won 12 medals with Malmö FF and two medals while playing for Trelleborgs FF.) (Note: Jan Möller and Jonnie Fedel shares the club and Allsvenskan records for goalkeeper with least conceded goals in a single season with 11 goals.) * | Sweden | GK | 1972–1980; 1984–1988 | 298 | 1 | 591 | 1 |
| Jonnie Fedel * | Sweden | GK | 1984–2001 | 293 | 0 | 588 | 1 |
| Daniel Andersson | Sweden | MF | 1995–1998; 2004–2013 | 292 | 30 | 460 | 39 |
| Torbjörn Persson (Note: Torbjörn Persson and Leif Engqvist shares the club and Allsvenskan records for most consecutive Allsvenskan championships with 5 consecutive championships.) * | Sweden | DF | 1980–1995 | 281 | 10 | 574 | 39 |
| Prawitz Öberg | Sweden | U | 1952–1965 | 278 | 34 | 515 | 103 |
| Johan Dahlin ‡ | Sweden | GK | 2009–2013; 2017– | 270 | 0 | 371 | 0 |
| Jörgen Ohlsson | Sweden | DF | 1991–2003 | 266 | 34 | 464 | 53 |
| Magnus Andersson (Note: Magnus Andersson holds the club and Allsvenskan records for shortest time between a players debut and championship won with 2 months and 18 days between his debut and when he won Allsvenskan with Malmö FF.) * | Sweden | DF | 1975–1988 | 265 | 12 | 568 | 28 |
| Helge Bengtsson (Note: Helge Bengtsson holds the club and Allsvenskan records for goalkeeper with most consecutive matches without defeat with 40 matches. The record was set between 6 May 1949 and 6 November 1950.) * | Sweden | GK | 1934–1951 | 265 | 0 | 501 | 3 |
| Ingemar Erlandsson | Sweden | DF | 1976–1987 | 230 | 14 | 473 | 46 |
| Ingvar Svahn | Sweden | HB | 1957–1968; 1970 | 228 | 62 | 414 | 161 |
| Staffan Tapper | Sweden | MF | 1967–1979 | 222 | 42 | 407 | 99 |
| Sture Mårtensson | Sweden | HB | 1937–1949 | 221 | 17 | 403 | 25 |
| Tore Svensson | Sweden | GK | 1951–1961 | 215 | 0 | 433 | 1 |
| Oscar Lewicki | Sweden | MF | 2015–2026 | 213 | 4 | 313 | 7 |
| Kent Jönsson | Sweden | DF | 1974–1987 | 211 | 5 | 480 | 9 |
| Olof Persson | Sweden | DF | 1997–2001; 2002–2006 | 209 | 11 | 350 | 20 |
| Markus Rosenberg | Sweden | FW | 2001–2005; 2014–2019 | 208 | 75 | 285 | 143 |
| Niclas Nyhlén | Sweden | MF | 1987–1996 | 205 | 16 | 410 | 33 |
| Kjell Rosén | Sweden | FB | 1939–1950 | 204 | 41 | 379 | 108 |
| Lars Granström (Note: Lars Granström holds the club record for youngest goalscorer at the age of 17 years and 159 days. The record was set in an Allsvenskan match against Djurgårdens IF on 15 May 1960.) * | Sweden | MF | 1960–1966; 1967–1971 | 202 | 52 | 359 | 120 |
| Andreas Nilsson | Sweden | HB | 1928–1940 | 201 | 59 | 371 | 168 |
| Egon Jönsson (Note: Egon Jönsson and Sven Hjertsson shares the club and Allsvenskan records for most consecutive matches without defeat with 49 matches. The record was set between 6 May 1949 and 1 June 1951.) * | Sweden | HB | 1943–1955 | 200 | 99 | 405 | 269 |
| Hans Mattisson | Sweden | MF | 1996–2006 | 200 | 21 | 350 | 39 |
| Harry Jönsson | Sweden | FW | 1967–1976 | 194 | 18 | 357 | 31 |
| Anders Christiansen ‡ | Denmark | MF | 2016–2017; 2018– | 194 | 53 | 293 | 75 |
| Hans Håkansson (Note: Hans Håkansson holds the club records for most league goals scored and most goals in one season in any league.) * | Sweden | FW | 1927–1938 | 192 | 163 | 350 | 341 |
| Bertil Elmstedt | Sweden | FW | 1956–1969 | 192 | 36 | 350 | 94 |
| Anders Ljungberg | Sweden | MF | 1967–1968; 1972–1979 | 192 | 32 | 371 | 75 |
| Rolf Björklund | Sweden | FB | 1960–1970 | 192 | 1 | 341 | 6 |
| Börje Tapper | Sweden | FW | 1939–1951 | 191 | 91 | 371 | 298 |
| Nils Hult | Sweden | GK | 1960; 1963–1972 | 184 | 0 | 329 | 0 |
| Lennart Svensson | Sweden | HB | 1956–1966 | 183 | 34 | 336 | 102 |
| Anders Andersson | Sweden | MF | 1990–1997; 2005–2008 | 183 | 19 | 305 | 50 |
| Thomas Sjöberg | Sweden | FW | 1974–1976; 1977–1978; 1979–1982 | 180 | 80 | 334 | 157 |
| Erdal Rakip | North Macedonia | MF | 2013–2017; 2019–2022 | 180 | 15 | 257 | 21 |
| Stellan Nilsson | Sweden | HB | 1940–1950 | 179 | 68 | 336 | 166 |
| Bertil Nilsson | Sweden | MF | 1953–1960; 1964–1966 | 178 | 40 | 342 | 111 |
| Guillermo Molins | Sweden | MF | 2006–2011; 2013–2016; 2018–2020 | 178 | 41 | 220 | 61 |
| Henry Thillberg | Sweden | FW | 1951–1962 | 177 | 42 | 367 | 149 |
| Jo Inge Berget | Sweden | FW | 2015–2017; 2019–2022 | 173 | 40 | 254 | 59 |
| Ivar Roslund | Sweden | HB | 1925–1937 | 169 | 71 | 311 | 179 |
| Ulrich Vinzents | Denmark | DF | 2006–2012 | 166 | 0 | 247 | 2 |
| Ricardinho | Brazil | DF | 2009–2014 | 159 | 3 | 248 | 5 |
| Søren Rieks | Sweden | FW | 2018–2025 | 159 | 39 | 242 | 49 |
| Anders Palmér | Sweden | MF | 1980–1988 | 158 | 26 | 348 | 73 |
| Arthur Bergquist | Sweden | FB | 1950–1957 | 158 | 5 | 302 | 10 |
| Sven Nilsson | Sweden | FB | 1931–1940 | 158 | 3 | 302 | 4 |
| Carl-Erik Sandberg | Sweden | FW | 1938–1947 | 156 | 31 | 269 | 130 |
| Sven Hjertsson * | Sweden | FB | 1942–1954 | 156 | 10 | 319 | 30 |
| Pontus Jansson ‡ | Sweden | DF | 2009–2014; 2023– | 156 | 10 | 219 | 16 |
| Sune Sandbring | Sweden | FB | 1949–1958 | 153 | 0 | 305 | 1 |
| Algot Christoffersson | Sweden | FB | 1923–1933 | 150 | 5 | 295 | 28 |
| Georg Österlin | Sweden | FB | 1932–1942 | 149 | 6 | 295 | 28 |
| Kjell Hjertsson | Sweden | HB | 1940–1950 | 148 | 3 | 270 | 15 |
| Jörgen Ohlin | Sweden | FB | 1956–1958; 1958–1967 | 147 | 5 | 271 | 8 |
| Behrang Safari | Sweden | DF | 2004–2008; 2016–2020 | 141 | 3 | 192 | 4 |
| Joseph Elanga | Cameroon | DF | 2000–2005; 2010 | 139 | 6 | 254 | 13 |
| Lasse Nielsen | Denmark | DF | 2017–2023 | 137 | 3 | 217 | 5 |
| Robert Prytz | Sweden | MF | 1977–1982; 1993–1995 | 135 | 26 | 262 | 57 |
| Björn Nilsson | Sweden | FW | 1979–1986 | 134 | 28 | 265 | 66 |
| Tommy Larsson | Sweden | MF | 1969–1978 | 134 | 26 | 255 | 50 |
| Per Ågren | Sweden | DF | 1983–1992 | 133 | 1 | 329 | 2 |
| Gustaf Nilsson | Sweden | FW | 1940–1950 | 132 | 65 | 265 | 205 |
| Åke Hansson | Sweden | HB | 1950–1957 | 132 | 14 | 292 | 59 |
| Isaac Kiese Thelin | Sweden | FW | 2014–2017; 2022; 2023–2025 | 132 | 65 | 196 | 86 |
| John Torstensson | Sweden | FB | 1920–1931 | 128 | 21 | 370 | 53 |
| Mats Arvidsson | Sweden | DF | 1978–1987 | 127 | 10 | 294 | 24 |
| Tore Cervin | Sweden | FW | 1972–1980 | 126 | 55 | 258 | 110 |
| Curt Olsberg | Sweden | MF | 1967–1973 | 126 | 36 | 226 | 70 |
| Yksel Osmanovski | Sweden | FW | 1995–1998; 2004–2007 | 126 | 22 | 212 | 42 |
| Jiloan Hamad | Sweden | MF | 2008–2013 | 126 | 22 | 203 | 34 |
| Tommy Andersson | Sweden | FW | 1969–1979 | 123 | 28 | 256 | 73 |
| Leif Engqvist * | Sweden | MF | 1985–1991 | 123 | 25 | 288 | 57 |
| Arne Månsson | Sweden | FB | 1944–1955 | 121 | 1 | 252 | 1 |
| Jens Fjellström | Sweden | MF | 1993–1996; 1999–2000 | 119 | 19 | 204 | 43 |
| Gunnar Martinsson | Sweden | HB | 1926–1938 | 119 | 6 | 232 | 19 |
| Franz Brorsson | Sweden | DF | 2014–2021 | 118 | 2 | 163 | 5 |
| Jonas Wirmola | Sweden | DF | 1994–2000 | 117 | 3 | 223 | 7 |
| Eric Larsson | Sweden | DF | 2018–2022 | 116 | 5 | 175 | 10 |
| Markus Halsti | Finland | DF | 2008–2014 | 115 | 6 | 197 | 8 |
| Ove Karlsson | Sweden | FB | 1936–1943 | 114 | 0 | 178 | 1 |
| Daniel Larsson | Sweden | FW | 2009–2012 | 113 | 31 | 168 | 46 |
| Agon Mehmeti | Albania | FW | 2008–2011; 2014–2016 | 113 | 27 | 178 | 40 |
| Niklas Skoog | Sweden | FW | 2001–2008 | 112 | 49 | 191 | 97 |
| Jan Ekström | Sweden | MF | 1955–1960; 1964–1966 | 111 | 38 | 222 | 124 |
| Niclas Kindvall | Sweden | FW | 1996–2000 | 111 | 31 | 193 | 54 |
| Åke Larsson | Sweden | FB | 1952–1959 | 111 | 2 | 207 | 3 |
| Charles Gustafsson | Sweden | HB | 1954–1961 | 108 | 50 | 231 | 141 |
| Gert Lundqvist | Sweden | FB | 1954–1962 | 107 | 5 | 214 | 16 |
| Hans Malmström | Sweden | FB | 1942–1950 | 107 | 0 | 209 | 0 |
| Anton Tinnerholm | Sweden | DF | 2014–2017; 2023–2025 | 107 | 6 | 149 | 7 |
| Ingvar Rydell | Sweden | FW | 1948–1953 | 106 | 68 | 210 | 162 |
| Ola Toivonen | Sweden | FW | 2007–2008; 2020–2022 | 105 | 31 | 113 | 34 |
| Ture Isberg | Sweden | FW | 1924–1932 | 104 | 31 | 187 | 70 |
| Patrik Andersson (Note: Patrik Andersson holds the club record for most international caps for the Sweden men's national football team.) * | Sweden | DF | 1989–1992; 2004–2005 | 104 | 12 | 184 | 24 |
| Mikael Roth | Sweden | DF | 1998–2002 | 102 | 0 | 166 | 2 |
| Mattias Asper | Sweden | GK | 2002–2006 | 100 | 0 | 161 | 0 |

== Club captains ==
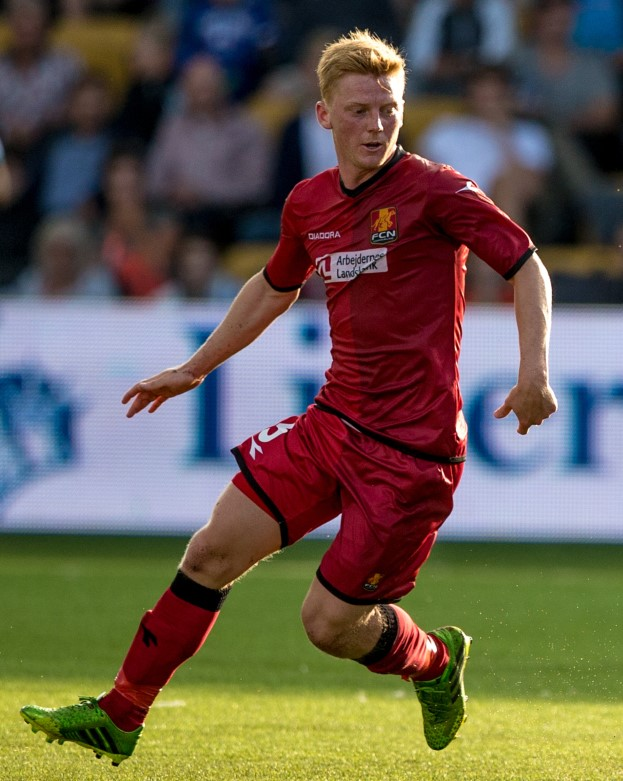
Anders Christiansen has captained Malmö FF since 2020

Since 1940, 30 players have held the position of club captain for Malmö FF. The first club captain was Sture Mårtensson, who was captain from 1940 to 1949. Mårtensson is also the longest-serving captain. Krister Kristensson, who was captain from 1970 to 1978, has the distinction of having won the most trophies as captain; he won five Allsvenskan titles and four Svenska Cupen titles. The current club captain is midfielder Anders Christiansen who has held the captaincy since the beginning of the 2020 season.

Club captains
| Name | Nationality | Position | Dates | Notes |
|---|---|---|---|---|
| Unknown | — | — | 1910–1939 | — |
| Sture Mårtensson | Sweden | HB | 1940–1949 | First known club captain and longest-serving captain in Malmö FF's history. |
| Helge Bengtsson | Sweden | GK | 1949 | — |
| Erik Nilsson | Sweden | FB | 1949–1953 | — |
| Sven Hjertsson | Sweden | FB | 1953–1954 | First captain not from Malmö and suburbs |
| Sune Sandbring | Sweden | FB | 1954–1958 | — |
| Tore Svensson | Sweden | GK | 1959–1961 | First captain not from Scania |
| Prawitz Öberg | Sweden | U | 1962–1965 | — |
| Jörgen Ohlin | Sweden | FB | 1966 | — |
| Anders Svensson | Sweden | HB | 1967–1968 | First captain to make less than 100 appearances. |
| Rolf Björklund | Sweden | FB | 1969–1970 | — |
| Krister Kristensson | Sweden | DF | 1970–1978 | Won more trophies than any other Malmö FF captain. |
| Staffan Tapper | Sweden | MF | 1979 | Co-captained with Bo Larsson. |
| Bo Larsson | Sweden | U | 1979 | Co-captained with Staffan Tapper. |
| Roland Andersson | Sweden | DF | 1980–1983 | — |
| Ingemar Erlandsson | Sweden | DF | 1984–1987 | — |
| Magnus Andersson | Sweden | DF | 1988 | — |
| Roger Ljung | Sweden | DF | 1989 | — |
| Per Ågren | Sweden | DF | 1989–1992 | — |
| Torbjörn Persson | Sweden | DF | 1993–1995 | — |
| Niclas Nyhlén | Sweden | MF | 1996 | — |
| Jonnie Fedel | Sweden | GK | 1996–1998 | — |
| Hans Mattisson | Sweden | MF | 1998–2000 | — |
| Olof Persson | Sweden | DF | 2001 | — |
| Hans Mattisson | Sweden | MF | 2002–2003 | First captain to have a second captaincy spell. |
| Patrik Andersson | Sweden | DF | 2004–2005 | — |
| Daniel Andersson | Sweden | MF | 2005–2011 | — |
| Ulrich Vinzents | Denmark | DF | 2012 | First non-Swedish club captain. |
| Jiloan Hamad | Sweden | MF | 2013 | — |
| Guillermo Molins | Sweden | MF | 2014 | — |
| Markus Rosenberg | Sweden | FW | 2015–2019 | — |
| Anders Christiansen | Denmark | MF | 2020– | — |
