= 1945 Svenska Cupen final =

- Event: 1945 Svenska Cupen
IFK Norrköping	Malmö FF
4	1
- Date: 26 August 1945
- Venue: Råsunda, Solna
- Referee: Erik Jansson (Kvarnsveden)
- Attendance: 31,896

The 1945 Svenska Cupen final took place on 26 August 1945 at Råsunda in Solna. It was contested between Allsvenskan sides IFK Norrköping and Malmö FF. The final was a repeat of last years final which Malmö FF won 4–3 after extra time. IFK Norrköping played their third final in total and Malmö FF played their second final in total. IFK Norrköping won their second title with a 4–1 victory.

== Match details ==
26 August 1945

IFK Norrköping	4–1	Malmö FF
Carlbom 13'; Ericson 37'; K.Nordahl 53', 71'		Sandberg 4'

Råsunda, Solna
Attendance: 31,896
Referee: Erik Jansson (Kvarnsveden)

IFK Norrköping	Malmö FF

IFK NORRKÖPING:
GK	(Sweden) Torsten Lindberg
DF	(Sweden) Oscar Holmqvist
DF	(Sweden) Gösta Malm
DF	(Sweden) Birger Rosengren
DF	(Sweden) Einar Stéen
MF	(Sweden) Lennart Wigren
MF	(Sweden) Halvar Carlbom
MF	(Sweden) Knut Nordahl
MF	(Sweden) Gunnar Nordahl
FW	(Sweden) Erik Holmqvist
FW	(Sweden) Georg Ericson
Manager:
(Hungary) Lajos Czeizler

MALMÖ FF:
GK	(Sweden) Helge Bengtsson
DF	(Sweden) Hans Malmström
DF	(Sweden) Erik Nilsson
DF	(Sweden) Kjell Rosén
DF	(Sweden) Sture Mårtensson
MF	(Sweden) Kjell Hjertsson
MF	(Sweden) Sven Hjertsson
MF	(Sweden) Börje Tapper
MF	(Sweden) Gustaf Nilsson
FW	(Sweden) Carl-Erik Sandberg
FW	(Sweden) Stellan Nilsson
Manager:
(Sweden) Sven Nilsson
