= 1951 Svenska Cupen final =

- Event: 1951 Svenska Cupen
Malmö FF	Djurgårdens IF
2	1
- Date: 22 July 1951
- Venue: Råsunda, Solna
- Referee: Sven Prytz (Skara)
- Attendance: 20,267

The 1951 Svenska Cupen final took place on 22 July 1951 at Råsunda in Solna. It was contested between Allsvenskan sides Malmö FF and Djurgårdens IF. Djurgården played their first cup final ever, Malmö FF played their first final since 1947 and their fifth final in total. Malmö FF won their fourth title with a 2–1 victory.

== Match details ==
22 July 1951

Malmö FF	2–1	Djurgårdens IF
Jönsson 39'; Ek 89'		Cederborg 61'

Råsunda, Solna
Attendance: 20,267
Referee: Sven Prytz (Skara)

Malmö FF	Djurgården

MALMÖ FF:
GK	(Sweden) Tore Svensson
DF	(Sweden) Sune Sandbring
DF	(Sweden) Erik Nilsson
DF	(Sweden) Åke Hansson
DF	(Sweden) Sven Hjertsson
MF	(Sweden) Arthur Jönsson
MF	(Sweden) Egon Jönsson
MF	(Sweden) Henry Thillberg
MF	(Sweden) Ingvar Rydell
FW	(Sweden) Walfrid Ek
FW	(Sweden) Einar Mårtensson
Manager:
(Wales) Bert Turner

DJURGÅRDENS IF:
GK	(Sweden) Ove Nilsson
DF	(Sweden) Birger Stenman
DF	(Sweden) Ingvar Pettersson
DF	(Sweden) Stig Andersson-Tvilling
DF	(Sweden) Berndt Ivegren
MF	(Sweden) Stig Carlsson
MF	(Sweden) Hilmer Pettersson
MF	(Sweden) Hans Andersson-Tvilling
MF	(Sweden) John Eriksson
FW	(Sweden) Nils Cederborg
FW	(Sweden) Gösta Sandberg
Manager:
(Wales) Dai Astley
