= 1944 Svenska Cupen final =

- Event: 1944 Svenska Cupen
Malmö FF	IFK Norrköping
4	3
- After extra time
- Date: 1 October 1944
- Venue: Råsunda, Solna
- Referee: Ivan Eklind (Stockholm)
- Attendance: 35,087

The 1944 Svenska Cupen final took place on 1 October 1944 at Råsunda in Solna. It was contested between Allsvenskan sides IFK Norrköping and Malmö FF. IFK Norrköping played their second consecutive final and their second final in total, Malmö FF played their first cup final ever. Malmö FF won their first title with a 4–3 victory after extra time. 35,087 spectators attended the match which was the record for the Svenska Cupen Final, until the 2026 final.

== Match details ==
1 October 1944

Malmö FF	4–3 (a.e.t.)	IFK Norrköping
Tapper 6', 7', 100'; Nilsson 40'		G.Nordahl 1', 52'; Rosengren 75'

Råsunda, Solna
Attendance: 35,087
Referee: Ivan Eklind (Stockholm)

Malmö FF	IFK Norrköping

MALMÖ FF:
GK	(Sweden) Helge Bengtsson
DF	(Sweden) Hans Malmström
DF	(Sweden) Erik Nilsson
DF	(Sweden) Kjell Rosén
DF	(Sweden) Sture Mårtensson
MF	(Sweden) Kjell Hjertsson
MF	(Sweden) Egon Jönsson
MF	(Sweden) Börje Tapper
MF	(Sweden) Gustaf Nilsson
FW	(Sweden) Carl-Erik Sandberg
FW	(Sweden) Stellan Nilsson
Manager:
(Hungary) István Wampetits

IFK NORRKÖPING:
GK	(Sweden) Torsten Lindberg
DF	(Sweden) Knut Nordahl
DF	(Sweden) Gösta Malm
DF	(Sweden) Birger Rosengren
DF	(Sweden) Einar Stéen
MF	(Sweden) Lennart Wigren
MF	(Sweden) Halvar Carlbom
MF	(Sweden) Sven Persson
MF	(Sweden) Gunnar Nordahl
FW	(Sweden) Erik Holmqvist
FW	(Sweden) Georg Ericson
Manager:
(Hungary) Lajos Czeizler
