= 1946 Svenska Cupen final =

- Event: 1946 Svenska Cupen
Malmö FF	Åtvidabergs FF
3	0
- Date: 25 August 1946
- Venue: Råsunda, Solna
- Referee: Tore Sjöberg (Stockholm)
- Attendance: 15,173

The 1946 Svenska Cupen final took place on 25 August 1946 at Råsunda in Solna. It was contested between Malmö FF and Åtvidabergs FF. Åtvidaberg played their first cup final ever, Malmö FF played their third consecutive final and their third final in total. Malmö FF won their second title with a 3–0 victory.

== Match details ==
25 August 1946

Malmö FF	3–0	Åtvidabergs FF
Jönsson 26'; Tapper 35'; Hjertsson 75'

Råsunda, Solna
Attendance: 15,173
Referee: Tore Sjöberg (Stockholm)

Malmö FF	Åtvidaberg

MALMÖ FF:
GK	(Sweden) Helge Bengtsson
DF	(Sweden) Hans Malmström
DF	(Sweden) Erik Nilsson
DF	(Sweden) Kjell Rosén
DF	(Sweden) Sture Mårtensson
MF	(Sweden) Kjell Hjertsson
MF	(Sweden) Egon Jönsson
MF	(Sweden) Börje Tapper
MF	(Sweden) Gustaf Nilsson
FW	(Sweden) Walfrid Ek
FW	(Sweden) Stellan Nilsson
Manager:
(Sweden) Sven Nilsson

ÅTVIDABERGS FF:
GK	(Sweden) Stig Nilsson
DF	(Sweden) Lennart Pettersson
DF	(Sweden) Rune Blomqvist
DF	(Sweden) Karl-Erik Härlin
DF	(Sweden) Yngve Ericson
MF	(Sweden) Nils Johansson
MF	(Sweden) Eric Södergren
MF	(Sweden) Einar Leoo
MF	(Sweden) Östen Andersson
FW	(Sweden) Arne Kjell
FW	(Sweden) Eric Bergström
Manager:
(Hungary) Kálmán Konrád
