= List of Sweden national football team captains =

The Sweden men's national football team (Swedish: Sveriges herrlandslag i fotboll) represents the nation of Sweden in international association football. The team is controlled by the Swedish Football Association (SvFF) (Swedish: Svenska Fotbollförbundet) and competes as a member of the UEFA and the FIFA. The team played its first official international match on 12 July 1908 against Norway, winning 11–3. Since the match against Norway, 1,225 players have made at least one international appearance for the team. Of them, 153 have served as captain of the national team. This list contains footballers who have served as captain of the Sweden national team and is listed according to their number of matches captained.

The Sweden national team's record appearance-maker as captain is Björn Nordqvist, who led the team out 92 times during his 115-cap tenure. He is the only player to have captained Sweden at the three different major tournaments; 1970 FIFA World Cup, 1974 FIFA World Cup and 1978 FIFA World Cup. During the tournament in 1974, Bo Larsson was the first-choice captain, but Nordqvist wore the armband in the last match against Yugoslavia. Zlatan Ibrahimović is the player with second most captaincies. Original a vice captain behind Henrik Larsson, he took over the armband in the summer of 2010 and wore it until his international retirement in 2016. Midfielder Jonas Thern and defender Erik Nilsson are the most successful captains regarding medals. Thern led Sweden to a semi-final in UEFA Euro 1992 and a third place in 1994 FIFA World Cup. Nilsson led Sweden to third places in both 1950 FIFA World Cup and 1952 Summer Olympics. Birger Rosengren became the first and so far only Swedish captain to win a major international competition after leading the team in the 1948 Summer Olympics. Nils Rosén captained Sweden in their first World Cup in 1934 and Nils Liedholm led the team to their best performance in the World Cup, runners-up in 1958.

== Captains ==
Players are initially listed by number of matches captained, followed by the chronological order of the first captaincy. Only players who started the match as captain are included here, not players that might have been given the armband due to the starting captain being injured, sent off or substituted off.

Statistics correct as of 17 November 2026.

Key
Still active for the national team (Note: Players who have not declared their retirement from international football and have been called up to the national team within the last two years.)
Captained the team at a major international tournament (Note: Includes matches in FIFA World Cup, UEFA European Championship and Olympic football tournament (1908–1952).)

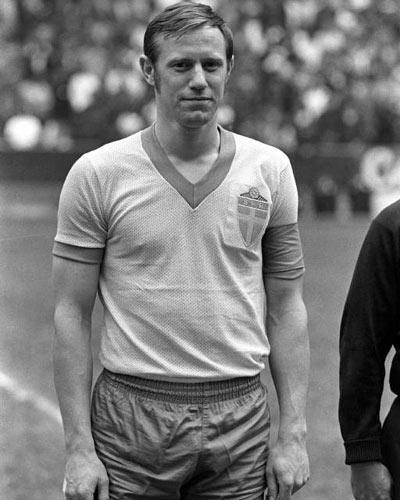
Holding the record for most captaincies, Björn Nordqvist captained Sweden in 92 matches, including the World Cups in 1970 and 1978.

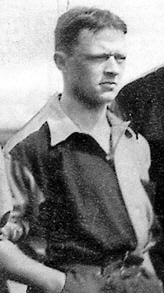
Gustaf Bergström captained Sweden in their first ever game against Norway on 12 July 1908.

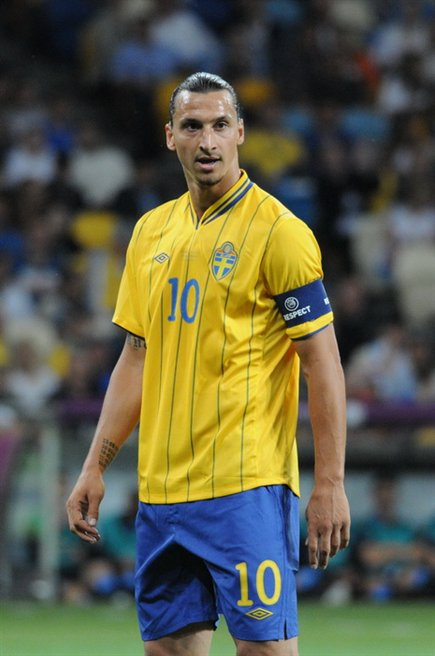
Zlatan Ibrahimović captained Sweden for six years, including the European Championships in 2012 and 2016.

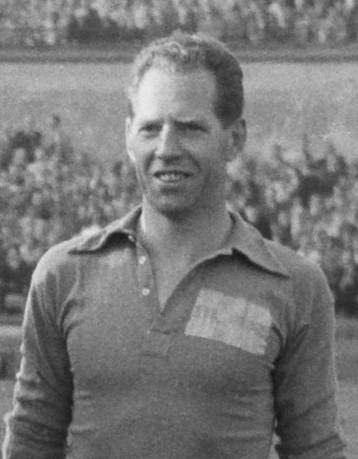
Erik Nilsson captained Sweden to third places at the 1950 FIFA World Cup and the 1952 Olympic football tournament.

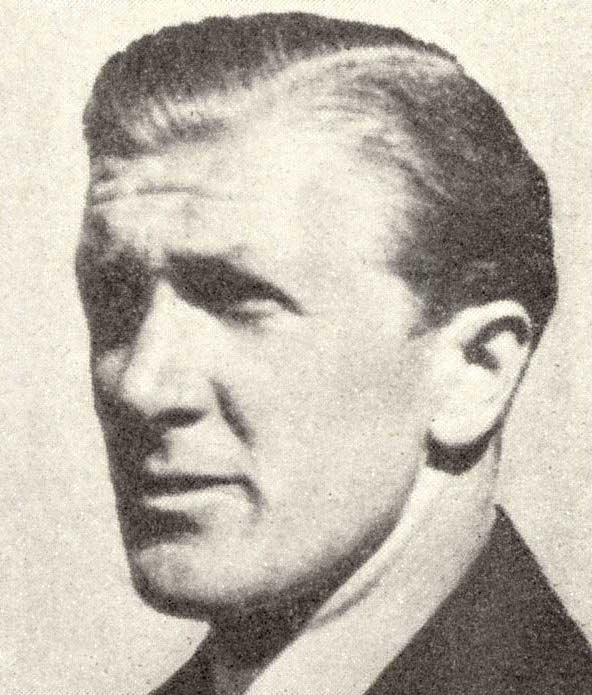
Birger Rosengren was the captain in all of his caps and captained Sweden to victory at the 1948 Olympic football tournament.

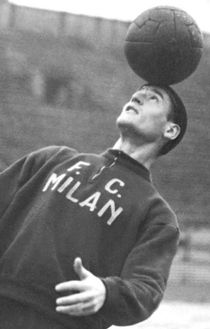
Nils Liedholm captained Sweden to the final at the 1958 FIFA World Cup, played at home soil.

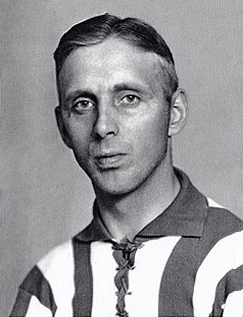
Tore Keller captained Sweden in four matches and led the team to a fourth place at the 1938 FIFA World Cup.

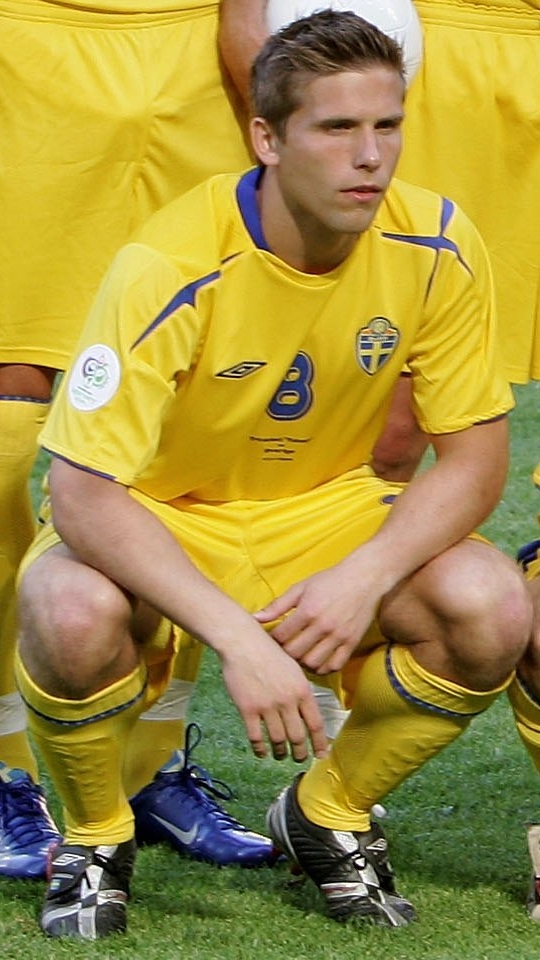
Being the most capped player with 148 caps, Anders Svensson was the captain in 21 matches.

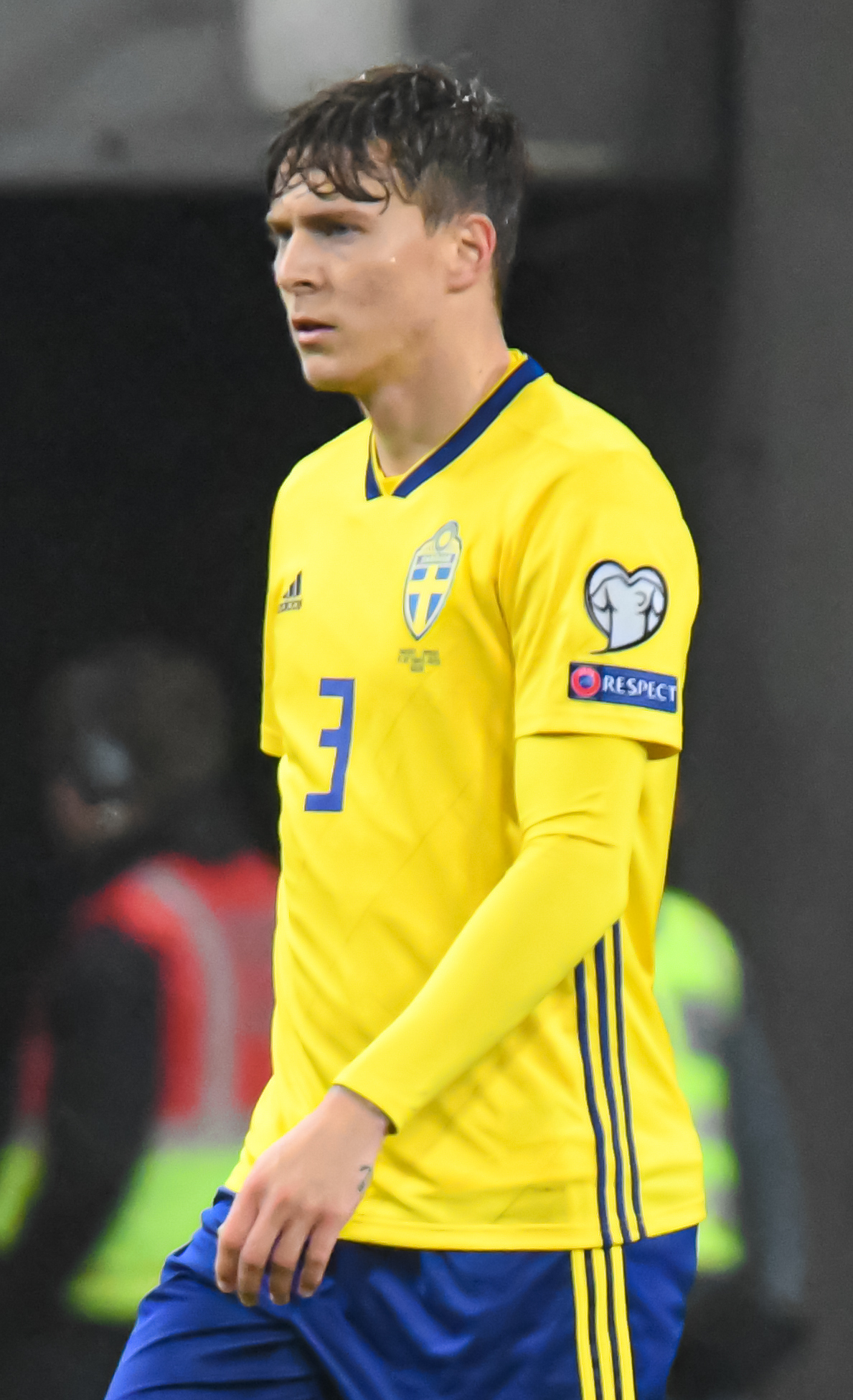
Victor Lindelöf captains Sweden since 2021.

List of Sweden national team football players who have served as captain of the team
Rank	Player	Sweden career	Caps as captain	Total caps	First to last captaincy
1	Björn Nordqvist	1963–1978	92	115	1967–1978
2	Zlatan Ibrahimović	2001–2023	58	122	2008–2016
3	Jonas Thern	1987–1997	55	75	1989–1997
4	Ingemar Erlandsson	1978–1985	47	69	1981–1985
5	Patrik Andersson	1992–2002	41	96	1995–2002
6	Orvar Bergmark	1951–1965	38	94	1959–1965
7	Erik Nilsson	1938–1952	37	57	1947–1952
7	Victor Lindelöf	2016–	37	86	2021–2026
9	Olof Mellberg	2000–2012	36	117	2002–2006
10	Andreas Granqvist	2006–2019	33	88	2016–2019
11	Sven Friberg	1915–1928	30	41	1920–1928
12	Bengt Gustavsson	1951–1963	29	57	1953–1962
13	Glenn Hysén	1981–1990	23	68	1987–1990
14	Åke Johansson	1955–1965	22	53	1956–1964
14	Roland Nilsson	1986–2000	22	116	1989–2000
16	Anders Svensson	1999–2013	21	148	2007–2013
17	Karl-Erik Grahn	1935–1946	17	41	1941–1946
17	Johan Mjällby	1997–2004	17	49	1998–2004
19	Stig Fredriksson	1979–1987	15	58	1985–1987
20	Agne Simonsson	1957–1967	14	51	1966–1967
20	Sebastian Larsson	2008–2021	14	133	2013–2021
22	Sven Jonasson	1932–1940	13	42	1935–1940
22	Freddie Ljungberg	1998–2008	13 (Note: Includes the abandoned match against Denmark on 2 June 2007, for which caps and goals were awarded.)	75	2006–2008
24	Axel Alfredsson	1924–1932	11	31	1925–1931
25	Per Kaufeldt	1921–1931	10	33	1926–1931
25	Harry Lundahl	1928–1933	10	14	1929–1933
25	Bo Larsson	1964–1978	10	70	1973–1974
28	Ragnar Wicksell	1911–1921	9	33	1914–1921
28	Birger Rosengren	1945–1948	9	9	1945–1948
30	Thure Svensson	1926–1931	8	10	1926–1930
30	Harry Nilsson	1938–1947	8	34	1946–1947
30	Hasse Borg	1976–1985	8	49	1979–1980
30	Henrik Larsson	1993–2009	8	106	2008–2009
34	Knut Nilsson	1911–1915	7	9	1912–1915
34	Karl Gustafsson	1908–1924	7	32	1913–1924
34	Herbert Samuelsson	1929–1932	7	11	1931–1932
34	Sven Andersson	1930–1938	7	27	1935–1938
34	Gösta Lindh	1950–1954	7	31	1951–1954
34	Daniel Andersson	1997–2009	7	74	2006–2009
34	Andreas Isaksson	2002–2016	7	133	2010–2016
34	Isak Hien	2022–	7	32	2025–2026
42	Hans Lindman	1908–1911	6	7	1908–1911
42	Herman Myhrberg	1909–1913	6	10	1911–1912
42	Bertil Nordenskjöld	1910–1920	6	8	1915–1920
42	Theodor Malm	1908–1920	6	26	1917–1920
42	Victor Carlund	1932–1936	6	12	1933–1936
42	Nils Rosén	1925–1934	6	25	1934
42	Stefan Rehn	1988–1995	6	45	1992–1994
42	Niclas Alexandersson	1993–2008	6	109	2005–2007
42	Tobias Linderoth	1999–2008	6	76	2005–2008
42	Marcus Berg	2008–2021	6	90	2020–2021
52	Erik Börjesson	1908–1922	5	17	1913–1919
52	Albert Andersson	1915–1921	5	11	1920–1921
52	Lennart Bunke	1933–1937	5	11	1937
52	Gunnar Gren	1940–1958	5	57	1957–1958
52	Nils Liedholm	1947–1958	5	23	1958
52	Roland Grip	1968–1974	5	55	1972–1973
52	Thomas Ravelli	1981–1997	5	143	1990–1995
52	Dejan Kulusevski	2019–	5	47	2024
60	Sven Rydell	1923–1932	4	43	1929–1932
60	Knut Kroon	1925–1934	4	35	1933
60	Tore Keller	1924–1938	4	25	1934–1938
60	Ronnie Hellström	1968–1980	4	77	1978–1979
60	Håkan Arvidsson	1976–1980	4	17	1979–1980
60	Albin Ekdal	2011–2023	4	70	2019–2023
66	Götrik Frykman	1911–1916	3	6	1911–1916
66	Rune Wenzel	1919–1930	3	30	1925–1926
66	Ernst Andersson	1931–1937	3	29	1935–1937
66	Erik Persson	1930–1939	3	32	1939
66	Nils Johansson	1959–1966	3	7	1963
66	Anders Linderoth	1972–1980	3	40	1979
66	Eine Fredriksson	1974–1980	3	20	1979–1980
66	Andreas Ravelli	1980–1989	3	41	1987–1988
66	Håkan Mild	1991–2001	3	74	2001
66	Pontus Jansson	2012–2020	3	27	2018–2019
66	Emil Forsberg	2014–2025	3	92	2022
77	Gustaf Bergström	1908–1909	2	6	1908–1909
77	Carl Ohlsson	1912–1919	2	4	1919
77	Helge Ekroth	1911–1922	2	18	1920–1922
77	Gösta Pettersson	1921–1923	2	2	1921–1923
77	Gustav Möller	1921–1923	2	6	1923
77	Gunnar Holmberg	1922–1927	2	12	1925–1927
77	Harry Johansson	1932–1935	2	9	1932
77	Einar Snitt	1926–1936	2	17	1935
77	Arvid Emanuelsson	1935–1946	2	35	1938–1945
77	Sven Jacobsson	1937–1947	2	7	1939–1947
77	Sture Mårtensson	1943–1948	2	3	1946–1948
77	Knut Nordahl	1945–1950	2	26	1949
77	Tommy Svensson	1967–1973	2	40	1970
77	Kent Karlsson	1973–1977	2	38	1974–1975
77	Leif Engqvist	1986–1990	2	18	1990
77	Peter Larsson	1983–1992	2	47	1991
77	Mats Gren	1984–1992	2	22	1992
77	Gary Sundgren	1994–2000	2	30	1997
77	Markus Johannesson	2001–2003	2	5	2001–2003
77	Andreas Jakobsson	1996–2004	2	36	2002–2004
77	Tommy Jönsson	2003	2	3	2003
77	Daniel Majstorović	2003–2013	2	50	2009
77	Johan Elmander	2002–2015	2	85	2015
77	Emil Bergström	2015–2016	2	3	2016
77	Oscar Lewicki	2014–2018	2	15	2017
77	Marcus Danielson	2019–2022	2	19	2020–2021
77	Viktor Claesson	2012–2023	2	74	2023
77	Alexander Isak	2017–	2	64	2025
105	Sixten Öberg	1910–1911	1	2	1910
105	Josef Appelgren	1911–1918	1	8	1916
105	Torsten Husén	1916	1	1	1916
105	Georg Bengtsson	1913–1917	1	3	1917
105	Konrad Törnqvist	1909–1919	1	14	1918
105	Victor Horndahl	1921	1	1	1921
105	Gösta Wihlborg	1919–1923	1	7	1921
105	Valdus Lund	1915–1923	1	29	1922
105	Gustaf Carlson	1915–1924	1	14	1924
105	Putte Kock	1919–1925	1	37	1924
105	Arvid Persson	1921–1924	1	2	1924
105	Douglas Krook	1924–1929	1	21	1926
105	Knut Lensing	1927	1	1	1927
105	Bror Persson	1928	1	1	1928
105	Arthur Bengtsson	1925–1930	1	4	1930
105	Torsten Lindskog	1930	1	1	1930
105	Gunnar Olsson	1923–1932	1	10	1932
105	Sven Nilsson	1937	1	1	1937
105	Malte Mårtensson	1937–1949	1	16	1943
105	Helge Bengtsson	1949	1	1	1949
105	Börje Leander	1941–1950	1	23	1950
105	Sven-Ove Svensson	1951–1956	1	31	1951
105	Karl-Erik Andersson	1948–1954	1	11	1954
105	Arne Arvidsson	1954–1965	1	27	1963
105	Harry Bild	1957–1968	1	28	1967
105	Ove Kindvall	1965–1974	1	43	1974
105	Olle Nordin	1970–1979	1	19	1979
105	Bo Börjesson	1976–1981	1	23	1981
105	Christian Karlsson	1996–1997	1	8	1997
105	Magnus Erlingmark	1990–1998	1	37	1998
105	Petter Hansson	2001–2009	1	43	2001
105	Klebér Saarenpää	2000–2001	1	11	2001
105	Per Nilsson	2001–2014	1	16	2003
105	Mikael Nilsson	2002–2009	1	64	2004
105	Teddy Lučić	1995–2006	1	86	2005
105	Johan Wiland	2007–2013	1	9	2011
105	Pär Hansson	2011–2014	1	6	2014
105	Jakob Johansson	2013–2019	1	18	2014
105	Anton Tinnerholm	2015–2018	1	9	2018
105	Johan Larsson	2014–2018	1	6	2018
105	Alexander Milošević	2013–2022	1	9	2019
105	Sotirios Papagiannopoulos	2018–2022	1	5	2019
105	Robin Söder	2020	1	1	2020
105	Gustav Svensson	2009–2021	1	32	2020
105	Robin Olsen	2015–2025	1	79	2022
105	Samuel Gustafson	2022–2024	1	13	2023
105	Edvin Kurtulus	2022–2023	1	4	2023
105	Isaac Kiese Thelin	2014–2024	1	33	2024
105	Viktor Gyökeres	2019–	1	43	2026

== Chronology ==
This is a chronology list of the first-choice captains in Sweden's tournament games. Matches in FIFA World Cup, UEFA European Championship and Olympic Games are included here.

Key
Champions
Runners-up
Third place
Fourth place

=== FIFA World Cup ===
Year	Incumbent
1934	Nils Rosén
1938	Tore Keller
1950	Erik Nilsson
1958	Nils Liedholm
1970	Björn Nordqvist
1974	Bo Larsson
1978	Björn Nordqvist
1990	Glenn Hysén
1994	Jonas Thern
2002	Patrik Andersson
2006	Olof Mellberg
2018	Andreas Granqvist
2026	Victor Lindelöf

=== UEFA European Championship ===
Year	Incumbent
1992	Jonas Thern
2000	Patrik Andersson
2004	Johan Mjällby
2008	Freddie Ljungberg
2012	Zlatan Ibrahimović
2016	Zlatan Ibrahimović
2020	Andreas Granqvist

=== Olympic Games ===
Year	Incumbent
1908	Hans Lindman
1912	Herman Myhrberg
1920	Bertil Nordenskjöld
1924	Sven Friberg
1936	Victor Carlund
1948	Birger Rosengren
1952	Erik Nilsson
