= 1953 Svenska Cupen final =

- Event: 1953 Svenska Cupen
Malmö FF	IFK Norrköping
3	2
- Date: 26 July 1953
- Venue: Råsunda, Solna
- Referee: Olof Gylén (Västerås)
- Attendance: 20,339

The 1953 Svenska Cupen final took place on 26 July 1953 at Råsunda in Solna. It was contested between Allsvenskan sides Malmö FF and IFK Norrköping. IFK Norrköping played their first final since 1945 and fourth final in total, Malmö FF played their second consecutive final and their sixth final in total. Malmö FF won their fifth title with a 3–2 victory.

== Match details ==
26 July 1953

Malmö FF	3–2	IFK Norrköping
Thillberg 3'; Sandell 69', 80'		Sandin 45'; Niva 46'

Råsunda, Solna
Attendance: 20,339
Referee: Olof Gylén (Västerås)

Malmö FF	IFK Norrköping

MALMÖ FF:
GK	(Sweden) Tore Svensson
DF	(Sweden) Sune Sandbring
DF	(Sweden) Arne Månsson
DF	(Sweden) Åke Hansson
DF	(Sweden) Sven Hjertsson
MF	(Sweden) Arthur Jönsson
MF	(Sweden) Egon Jönsson
MF	(Sweden) Henry Thillberg
MF	(Sweden) Nils-Åke Sandell
FW	(Sweden) Ingvar Rydell
FW	(Sweden) Prawitz Öberg
Manager:
(Wales) Bert Turner

IFK NORRKÖPING:
GK	(Sweden) Bengt Nyholm
DF	(Sweden) Bengt Gustavsson
DF	(Sweden) Karl-Edvin Stéen
DF	(Sweden) Göte Arnell
DF	(Sweden) Åke Johansson
MF	(Sweden) Holger Nyman
MF	(Sweden) Henry Källgren
MF	(Sweden) Olle Håkansson
MF	(Sweden) Herbert Sandin
FW	(Sweden) Roland Niva
FW	(Sweden) Lennart Holmqvist
Manager:
(Austria) Karl Adamek
