= Hjertsson =

Hjertsson is a Swedish surname. Notable people with the surname include:

- Arne Hjertsson (1918–1987), Swedish footballer
- Kjell Hjertsson (1922–2013), Swedish footballer
- Sven Hjertsson (1924–1999), Swedish footballer, brother of Arne and Kjell
