= Helsingborgs IF–Malmö FF rivalry =

Association football rivalry in Sweden

Skåne derby
- Other names: Slaget om Skåne (English: The battle for Scania)
- Location: Scania, Sweden
- Teams: Helsingborgs IF; Malmö FF
- First meeting: 10 September 1916
- Latest meeting: 18 September 2022; Helsingborgs IF 1–2 Malmö FF
- Next meeting: TBD

Statistics
- Total meetings: Competitive: 154
- Most wins: Malmö FF (76)
- Largest victory: 19 August 1965; Helsingborgs IF 1–10 Malmö FF

The fixture between Helsingborgs IF and Malmö FF is a local derby in Scania, Sweden and a fierce rivalry. The derby does not have a common name, any derby in Scania is usually called a "Skånederby" (English: Scanian derby), the fixture is sometimes referred to as Slaget om Skåne (English: The battle for Scania). The rivalry has arisen because the two clubs are the most historically successful clubs in Scania and also come from the two most populous cities in Scania. The two clubs have also played most seasons in the top tier league Allsvenskan of all Scanian clubs and they are also the only Scanian clubs to have won the Swedish football championship, Malmö FF with 22 titles and Helsingborgs IF with 5 titles. In the early days of Swedish club football before the time of national league play the two clubs often faced each other in the final of the regional championship "Distriktmästerskapet". The clubs have also faced each other in Svenska Cupen and Supercupen. The majority of all matches between the two clubs have taken place in Allsvenskan. The rivalry temporarily died out between 1968 and 1993 when they weren't playing in the same league, Helsingborgs IF had been relegated from Allsvenskan and spent 23 season in lower leagues while Malmö FF played in Allsvenskan. In 2020, Helsingborgs IF were relegated from the top tier once again; Malmö FF had a one year stint in Superettan in 2000.

== Shared player history ==
=== Transfers ===
The lists are incomplete. There have been several direct transfers between the rivals, the most recent transfer was on 1 January 2012. The majority of the transfers has been from Malmö FF to Helsingborgs IF in the early 1990s when Helsingborg made their comeback to Allsvenskan after having been in lower leagues since the late 1960s.

Date	Name	From	To
Unknown	Fritz Landgren	Malmö FF	Helsingborgs IF
1924	Emil Gudmundsson	Malmö FF	Helsingborgs IF
1950	Hans Malmström	Malmö FF	Helsingborgs IF
1955	Bengt Lindskog	Helsingborgs IF	Malmö FF
1969	Gert-Arne Nilsson	Malmö FF	Helsingborgs IF
1970	Anders Svensson	Malmö FF	Helsingborgs IF
1970	Björn Ranelid	Malmö FF	Helsingborgs IF
1983	Thomas Sjöberg	Malmö FF	Helsingborgs IF
1984	Anders Ohlsson	Malmö FF	Helsingborgs IF
1989	Anders Jönsson	Malmö FF	Helsingborgs IF
1989	Jan Möller	Malmö FF	Helsingborgs IF
1991	Jörgen Persson	Malmö FF	Helsingborgs IF
1992	Andreas Augustsson	Malmö FF	Helsingborgs IF
1993	Per Ågren	Malmö FF	Helsingborgs IF
1993	Patrik Sundström	Malmö FF	Helsingborgs IF
1994	Patrick Andersson	Malmö FF	Helsingborgs IF
1995	Peter Hillgren	Malmö FF	Helsingborgs IF
2 August 2007	Babis Stefanidis	Helsingborgs IF	Malmö FF
1 January 2012	Simon Thern	Helsingborgs IF	Malmö FF
1 February 2023	Taha Ali	Helsingborgs IF	Malmö FF

There have also been a few players who have played for both clubs although transferred via another club.

Name	From	Period	Via	To	Period
Tore Cervin	Malmö FF	1972–1980	Toronto Blizzard; Limhamns IF	Helsingborgs IF	1984–1985
Mats Magnusson	Malmö FF	1981–1985; 1986–1987	Benfica	Helsingborgs IF	1992–1994
Christian Järdler	Helsingborgs IF	2000–2005	Gençlerbirliği	Malmö FF	2006–2008
Nikola Đurđić	Helsingborgs IF	2012	SpVgg Greuther Fürth; Augsburg	Malmö FF	2015
Martin Olsson	Helsingborgs IF	2020	BK Häcken	Malmö FF	2021-
Moustafa Zeidan	Helsingborgs IF	2016-17	Syrianska; Brommapojkarna; Frej; Jönköpings Södra; Sirius	Malmö FF	2022-
Joseph Ceesay	Helsingborgs IF	2020-21	Lechia Gdańsk	Malmö FF	2022-

=== Played for one, managed the other ===
Manager	Played for		Managed	
Manager	Team	Span	Team	Span
Harry Lundahl	Helsingborgs IF	1927–1931; 1937–1938	Malmö FF	1937–1941
Roland Nilsson	Helsingborgs IF	1981–1983; 1994–1997; 1999–2001	Malmö FF	2008–2011

=== Managed both clubs ===
Åge Hareide is the only man to have managed both clubs. With Helsingborgs IF he won the 1999 Allsvenskan and the 1997–98 Svenska Cupen. With Malmö FF he won the 2014 Allsvenskan and the 2014 Svenska Supercupen.

Manager	Helsingborgs IF career						Malmö FF career					
Manager	Span	G^{1}	W	D	L	Win %	Span	G^{1}	W	D	L	Win %
(Norway) Åge Hareide	1998–1999; 2012	107	57	24	26	53.3	2014–2015	95	49	20	26	51.6

^{1} Only competitive matches are counted.

== Statistics ==
	Helsingborgs IF wins	Draws	Malmö FF wins
League	39	29	56
Svenska Cupen	3	0	7
Other	5	2	13
Total	47	31	76

Table correct as of 18 September 2022

== Last five head-to-head fixtures ==
Date	Home team	Score	Away team	Venue	Competition
25 September 2019	Malmö FF	3–0	Helsingborgs IF	Stadion	Allsvenskan
5 August 2020	Malmö FF	4–1	Helsingborgs IF	Stadion	Allsvenskan
2 November 2020	Helsingborgs IF	0–1	Malmö FF	Olympia	Allsvenskan
27 June 2022	Malmö FF	2–1	Helsingborgs IF	Stadion	Allsvenskan
18 September 2022	Helsingborgs IF	1–2	Malmö FF	Olympia	Allsvenskan

== Honours ==
Team	Allsvenskan	Svenska Cupen	Supercupen	Total
Malmö FF	25	15	2	40
Helsingborgs IF	7	5	2	14
Combined	32	20	4	54

Table correct as of 27 June 2022

== All-time results ==
=== Helsingborgs IF in the league at home ===
Date	Venue	Attendance	Score	Competition
25 May 1922	Olympia	Unknown	1–1	Svenska Serien
20 September 1931	Olympia	5,309	5–2	Allsvenskan
9 April 1933	Olympia	5,170	6–1	Allsvenskan
20 October 1935	Olympia	6,109	2–1	Division 2 Södra
26 September 1937	Olympia	8,657	2–1	Allsvenskan
11 September 1938	Olympia	7,035	2–1	Allsvenskan
9 August 1939	Olympia	4,518	2–1	Allsvenskan
11 August 1940	Olympia	4,609	3–2	Allsvenskan
21 September 1941	Olympia	7,312	2–2	Allsvenskan
26 July 1942	Olympia	5,336	2–2	Allsvenskan
18 May 1944	Olympia	9,556	2–2	Allsvenskan
8 October 1944	Olympia	9,914	2–5	Allsvenskan
30 May 1946	Olympia	8,095	0–2	Allsvenskan
18 August 1946	Olympia	10,207	1–2	Allsvenskan
14 May 1948	Olympia	18,653	2–0	Allsvenskan
26 September 1948	Olympia	17,014	1–1	Allsvenskan
26 May 1950	Olympia	24,314	2–2	Allsvenskan
11 August 1950	Olympia	17,569	1–3	Allsvenskan
9 May 1952	Olympia	19,443	1–0	Allsvenskan
15 August 1952	Olympia	16,008	1–1	Allsvenskan
14 May 1954	Olympia	26,154	3–3	Allsvenskan
27 May 1955	Olympia	23,981	0–1	Allsvenskan
11 August 1955	Olympia	18,568	4–1	Allsvenskan
1 August 1956	Olympia	19,290	0–0	Allsvenskan
21 August 1957	Olympia	17,608	1–2	Allsvenskan
7 September 1958	Olympia	11,414	1–0	Allsvenskan
12 August 1959	Olympia	9,853	2–3	Allsvenskan
11 September 1960	Olympia	10,135	1–0	Allsvenskan
7 May 1961	Olympia	9,606	1–3	Allsvenskan
7 June 1962	Olympia	12,444	1–3	Allsvenskan
16 May 1963	Olympia	11,160	1–1	Allsvenskan
19 April 1964	Olympia	12,151	2–2	Allsvenskan
19 August 1965	Olympia	12,960	1–10	Allsvenskan
14 September 1966	Olympia	13,623	1–0	Allsvenskan
11 May 1967	Olympia	21,787	0–2	Allsvenskan
19 October 1968	Olympia	13,761	2–0	Allsvenskan
27 September 1993	Olympia	13,063	0–2	Allsvenskan
19 May 1994	Olympia	10,584	0–0	Allsvenskan
15 May 1995	Olympia	11,498	2–1	Allsvenskan
19 September 1996	Olympia	10,774	1–2	Allsvenskan
16 June 1997	Olympia	14,301	2–1	Allsvenskan
24 September 1998	Olympia	11,333	1–2	Allsvenskan
21 August 1999	Olympia	11,277	1–0	Allsvenskan
6 August 2001	Olympia	15,527	1–1	Allsvenskan
7 May 2002	Olympia	15,107	2–3	Allsvenskan
15 September 2003	Olympia	15,460	0–0	Allsvenskan
24 May 2004	Olympia	16,069	0–2	Allsvenskan
13 June 2005	Olympia	16,495	0–1	Allsvenskan
12 September 2006	Olympia	17,000	3–1	Allsvenskan
15 May 2007	Olympia	16,500	0–1	Allsvenskan
28 April 2008	Olympia	16,704	4–2	Allsvenskan
4 May 2009	Olympia	15,800	1–0	Allsvenskan
20 April 2010	Olympia	16,200	2–1	Allsvenskan
23 July 2011	Olympia	16,500	2–2	Allsvenskan
24 September 2012	Olympia	14,191	1–1	Allsvenskan
25 September 2013	Olympia	16,300	0–3	Allsvenskan
8 May 2014	Olympia	10,950	0–1	Allsvenskan
30 August 2015	Olympia	12,678	0–3	Allsvenskan
5 May 2016	Olympia	11,065	2–1	Allsvenskan
2 June 2019	Olympia	16,127	0–1	Allsvenskan
2 November 2020	Olympia	0	0–1	Allsvenskan
18 September 2022	Olympia	15,800	1–2	Allsvenskan

Helsingborgs IF wins	Malmö FF wins	Draws
22	24	16

=== Malmö FF in the league at home ===
Date	Venue	Attendance	Score	Competition
22 October 1922	Malmö IP	1,861	2–3	Svenska Serien
10 April 1932	Malmö IP	6,883	3–5	Allsvenskan
10 August 1932	Malmö IP	8,219	4–2	Allsvenskan
9 August 1933	Malmö IP	7,717	2–4	Allsvenskan
24 May 1936	Malmö IP	12,745	3–0	Division 2 Södra
18 August 1937	Malmö IP	9,637	1–3	Allsvenskan
2 April 1939	Malmö IP	8,554	3–0	Allsvenskan
28 April 1940	Malmö IP	4,526	2–1	Allsvenskan
4 May 1941	Malmö IP	7,042	1–1	Allsvenskan
22 May 1942	Malmö IP	8,821	2–1	Allsvenskan
16 May 1943	Malmö IP	11,383	0–4	Allsvenskan
29 August 1943	Malmö IP	12,662	2–2	Allsvenskan
15 April 1945	Malmö IP	12,168	2–0	Allsvenskan
3 August 1945	Malmö IP	12,776	4–1	Allsvenskan
21 May 1947	Malmö IP	12,196	2–1	Allsvenskan
13 August 1947	Malmö IP	14,370	5–2	Allsvenskan
6 May 1949	Malmö IP	18,383	2–2	Allsvenskan
12 August 1949	Malmö IP	18,917	5–0	Allsvenskan
11 May 1951	Malmö IP	20,781	3–1	Allsvenskan
17 August 1951	Malmö IP	20,779	2–0	Allsvenskan
26 May 1953	Malmö IP	15,381	1–0	Allsvenskan
21 August 1953	Malmö IP	20,776	1–2	Allsvenskan
11 August 1954	Malmö IP	18,047	2–4	Allsvenskan
1 June 1956	Malmö IP	22,620	0–3	Allsvenskan
5 June 1957	Malmö IP	17,905	1–2	Allsvenskan
27 October 1957	Malmö IP	11,312	2–3	Allsvenskan
26 April 1959	Malmö Stadion	16,619	1–1	Allsvenskan
9 June 1960	Malmö Stadion	9,132	2–1	Allsvenskan
7 September 1961	Malmö Stadion	16,379	1–1	Allsvenskan
17 August 1962	Malmö Stadion	13,733	2–0	Allsvenskan
26 September 1963	Malmö Stadion	6,422	4–1	Allsvenskan
20 August 1964	Malmö Stadion	16,778	4–1	Allsvenskan
11 April 1965	Malmö Stadion	6,028	5–0	Allsvenskan
9 June 1966	Malmö Stadion	15,559	4–1	Allsvenskan
24 September 1967	Malmö Stadion	29,280	1–2	Allsvenskan
5 June 1968	Malmö Stadion	16,119	2–0	Allsvenskan
13 May 1993	Malmö Stadion	28,722	3–3	Allsvenskan
31 August 1994	Malmö Stadion	10,948	2–0	Allsvenskan
10 September 1995	Malmö Stadion	16,013	0–1	Allsvenskan
27 May 1996	Malmö Stadion	24,508	1–1	Allsvenskan
3 August 1997	Malmö Stadion	17,704	4–2	Allsvenskan
28 April 1998	Malmö Stadion	16,328	1–1	Allsvenskan
6 July 1999	Malmö Stadion	18,083	0–4	Allsvenskan
19 June 2001	Malmö Stadion	26,500	0–1	Allsvenskan
11 September 2002	Malmö Stadion	24,061	0–2	Allsvenskan
30 June 2003	Malmö Stadion	27,477	5–0	Allsvenskan
24 August 2004	Malmö Stadion	22,920	1–1	Allsvenskan
20 September 2005	Malmö Stadion	20,346	2–0	Allsvenskan
8 May 2006	Malmö Stadion	23,571	3–1	Allsvenskan
7 August 2007	Malmö Stadion	22,746	1–1	Allsvenskan
30 September 2008	Malmö Stadion	15,666	1–2	Allsvenskan
31 August 2009	Stadion	22,822	0–0	Allsvenskan
15 September 2010	Stadion	23,743	2–0	Allsvenskan
24 May 2011	Stadion	23,612	0–3^{1}	Allsvenskan
10 May 2012	Stadion	23,638	3–0	Allsvenskan
29 May 2013	Stadion	23,730	1–1	Allsvenskan
21 September 2014	Stadion	20,310	1–1	Allsvenskan
3 May 2015	Stadion	21,626	3–1	Allsvenskan
25 September 2016	Stadion	19,918	2–0	Allsvenskan
25 September 2019	Stadion	21,294	3–0	Allsvenskan
5 August 2020	Stadion	0	4–1	Allsvenskan
27 June 2022	Stadion	20,231	2–1	Allsvenskan

Malmö FF wins	Helsingborgs IF wins	Draws
32	17	13

^{1} Awarded 0–3 after the original match had been suspended with the score at a 0–1 as a result of a spectator scandal.

=== Results at home in Cup matches ===
Includes fixtures for the regional competition "Distriktsmästerskapet".

Date	Venue	Attendance	Matches			Competition
Date	Venue	Attendance	Team 1	Score	Team 2	Competition
10 September 1916	Malmö IP	Unknown	Malmö FF	3–4	Helsingborgs IF	Distriktmästerskapet (Final)
2 August 1922	Malmö IP	Unknown	Malmö FF	1–1	Helsingborgs IF	Distriktmästerskapet (Final)
16 August 1922	Unknown venue	Unknown	Malmö FF	1–3	Helsingborgs IF	Distriktmästerskapet (Final, replay)
21 July 1939	Olympia	Unknown	Helsingborgs IF	1–3	Malmö FF	Distriktmästerskapet (Final)
23 August 1942	Malmö IP	Unknown	Malmö FF	2–1	Helsingborgs IF	Distriktmästerskapet (Final)
7 November 1943	Malmö IP	Unknown	Malmö FF	4–1	Helsingborgs IF	Distriktmästerskapet (Final)
27 August 1944	Malmö IP	10,882	Malmö FF	6–0	Helsingborgs IF	Svenska Cupen (Semi-final)
21 October 1945	Unknown venue	Unknown	Malmö FF	5–0	Helsingborgs IF	Distriktmästerskapet (Final)
21 July 1946	Malmö IP	12,650	Malmö FF	7–0	Helsingborgs IF	Svenska Cupen (Semi-final)
17 November 1946	Malmö IP	Unknown	Malmö FF	3–1	Helsingborgs IF	Distriktmästerskapet (Final)
20 July 1947	Olympia	9,472	Helsingborgs IF	0–3	Malmö FF	Svenska Cupen (Semi-final)
12 June 1949	Malmö IP	Unknown	Malmö FF	3–2	Helsingborgs IF	Distriktmästerskapet (Final)
19 June 1952	Malmö IP	Unknown	Malmö FF	2–1	Helsingborgs IF	Distriktmästerskapet (Final)
8 July 1953	Olympia	Unknown	Helsingborgs IF	1–0	Malmö FF	Distriktmästerskapet (Final)
22 July 1953	Olympia	14,446	Helsingborgs IF	0–3	Malmö FF	Svenska Cupen (Semi-final)
11 June 1954	Malmö IP	Unknown	Malmö FF	3–0	Helsingborgs IF	Distriktmästerskapet (Final)
20 July 1955	Malmö IP	Unknown	Malmö FF	3–3	Helsingborgs IF	Distriktmästerskapet (Final)
25 March 1956	Heden	Unknown	Helsingborgs IF	1–2	Malmö FF	Distriktmästerskapet (Final)
1 November 1958	Olympia	Unknown	Helsingborgs IF	1–2	Malmö FF	Distriktmästerskapet (Final)
8 November 1959	Unknown venue	Unknown	Helsingborgs IF	1–3	Malmö FF	Distriktmästerskapet (Final)
5 November 1960	Olympia	Unknown	Helsingborgs IF	1–2	Malmö FF	Distriktmästerskapet (Final)
13 July 1962	Olympia	Unknown	Helsingborgs IF	4–0	Malmö FF	Distriktmästerskapet (Semi-final)
13 July 1965	Olympia	Unknown	Helsingborgs IF	2–5	Malmö FF	Distriktmästerskapet (Final)
29 August 1968	Olympia	3,774	Helsingborgs IF	0–2	Malmö FF	Svenska Cupen (Round 5)
19 August 1992	Olympia	4,391	Helsingborgs IF	1–0	Malmö FF	Svenska Cupen (Round 3)
27 April 1994	Malmö Stadion	9,872	Malmö FF	2–4	Helsingborgs IF	Svenska Cupen (Semi-final)
12 November 2000	Malmö Stadion	6,146	Malmö FF	2–1	Helsingborgs IF	Svenska Cupen (Round 3)
16 May 2002	Olympia	3,634	Helsingborgs IF	0–3	Malmö FF	Svenska Cupen (Round 3)
19 March 2011	Swedbank Stadion	10,362	Malmö FF	1–2	Helsingborgs IF	Svenska Supercupen
1 May 2014	Swedbank Stadion	8,540	Malmö FF	0–2	Helsingborgs IF	Svenska Cupen (Semi-final)

Malmö FF wins	Helsingborgs IF wins	Draws
20	8	2
