= Stig Carlsson =

Stig Carlsson can refer to:

- Stig Carlsson (1932–1997), a Swedish sound pioneer
- Stig Carlsson (footballer), a Swedish footballer
- Stig Carlsson (ice hockey), a Swedish ice hockey player
