= Krister Kristensson =

Swedish footballer and manager (1942–2023)

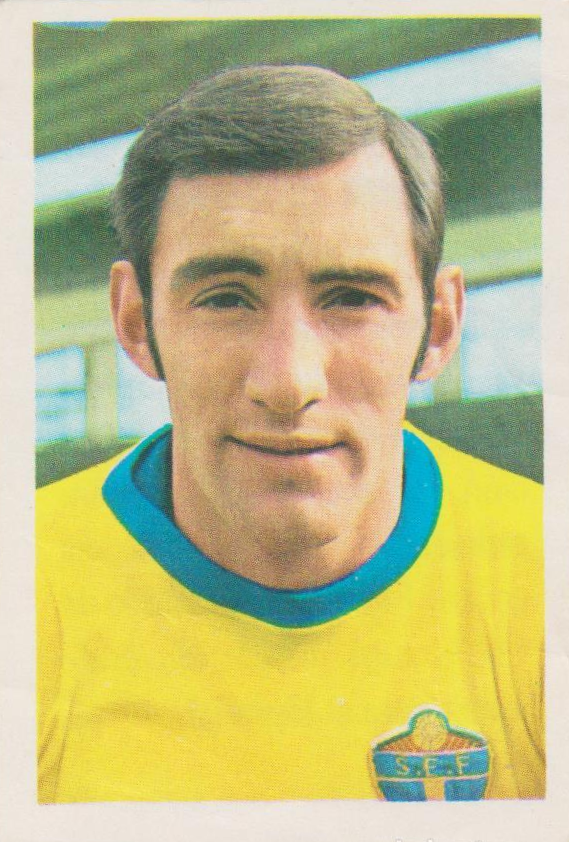
- Kristensson in 1970

Personal information
- Full name: Carl Krister Kristensson
- Date of birth: 25 July 1942
- Place of birth: Malmö, Sweden
- Date of death: 28 January 2023 (aged 80)
- Position: Defender

Senior career*
Years	Team	Apps	(Gls)
1963–1979	Malmö FF	348	(6)
1980–1981	Trelleborgs FF	22	(0)
Total		370	(6)

International career
1963–1964	Sweden U21	6	(0)
1967–1972	Sweden	38	(0)

Managerial career
- 1979–1986: Trelleborgs FF
- 1986–1987: Lunds BK
- 1989–1993: Höllvikens GIF
- * Club domestic league appearances and goals

Carl Krister Kristensson (25 July 1942 – 28 January 2023) was a Swedish footballer who played as a defender. He represented Malmö FF and Trelleborgs FF during a career that spanned between 1963 and 1981. A full international between 1967 and 1972, he won 38 caps for the Sweden national team and represented his country at the 1970 FIFA World Cup.

== Club career ==
Kristensson played most of his career for Malmö FF. He played 626 games for the club from 1963 to 1979. He won Allsvenskan seven times and Svenska Cupen five times.

== International career ==
Kristensson was capped 38 times for the Sweden national team, and was a part of the Sweden squad for the 1970 FIFA World Cup.

== Post-playing career ==
After his playing career Kristensson managed Trelleborgs FF (1979–1986), Lunds BK (1986–1987) and Höllvikens GIF (1989–1993) and was active as a board member of Malmö FF from 1995 to 2010. Outside of football Kristensson worked for 46 years, from the age of 16, for Swedish newspaper Sydsvenskan.

== Personal life and death ==
Kristensson had to amputate one of his lower legs in 2020, following infections related to a staircase accident in South Africa the previous year.

Kristensson died on 28 January 2023, at the age of 80.

== Career statistics ==
=== International ===
Appearances and goals by national team and year
National team	Year	Apps	Goals
Sweden	1967	2	0
Sweden	1968	5	0
Sweden	1969	9	0
Sweden	1970	7	0
Sweden	1971	8	0
Sweden	1972	7	0
Total		38	0

== Honours ==
Malmö FF

- Allsvenskan: 1965, 1967, 1970, 1971, 1974, 1975, 1977
- Svenska Cupen: 1967, 1972–73, 1973–74, 1974–75, 1977–78
- European Cup runner-up: 1978–79
- Bragdguldet: 1979

Individual

- Stor Grabb: 1969

Records

- Most appearances for Malmö FF: 626

Sporting positions
Preceded by Rolf Björklund	Malmö FF; Captain; 1970–1978	Succeeded by Staffan Tapper; Bo Larsson
