= Niclas Nylén =

Swedish footballer

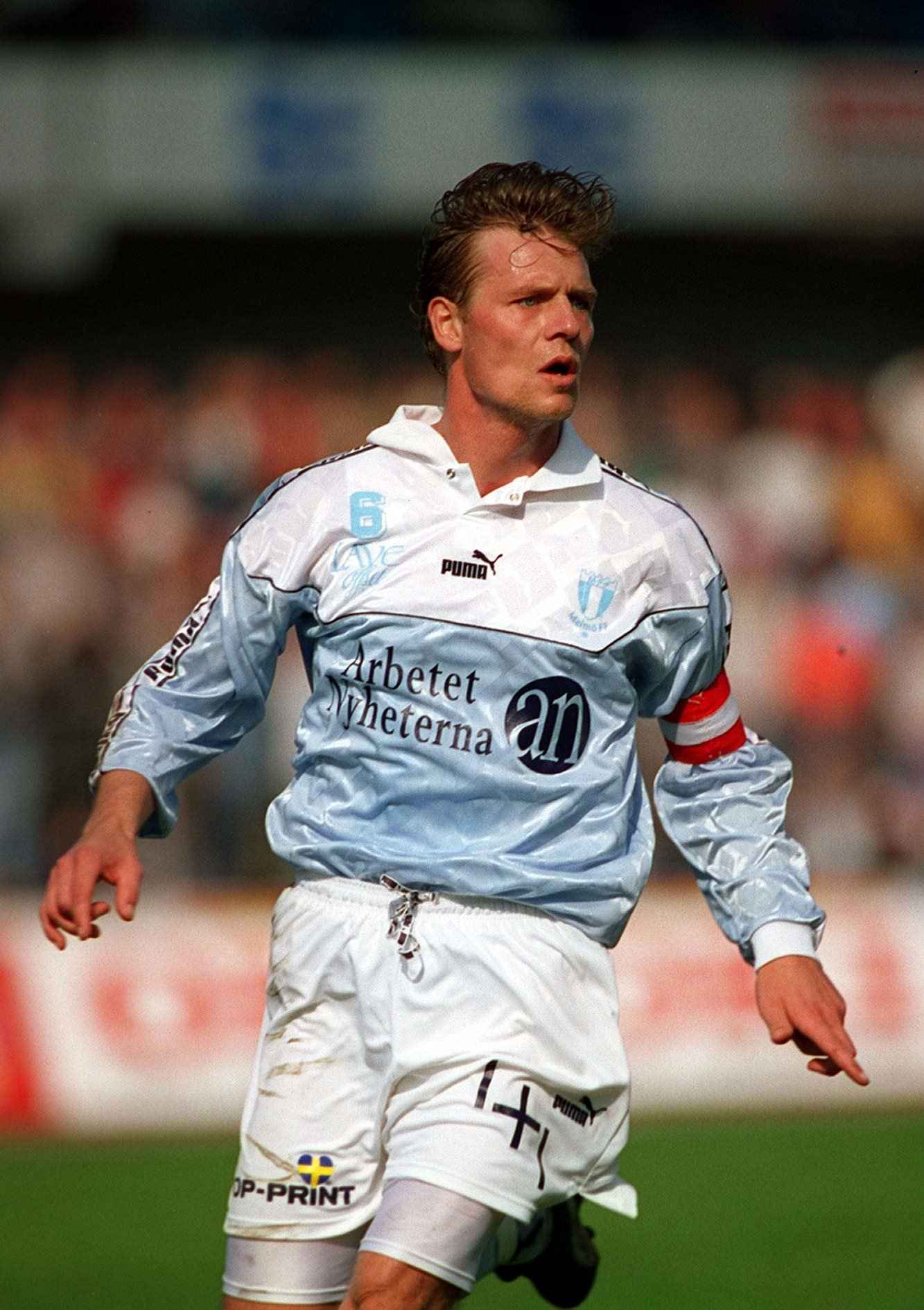

Personal information
- Full name: Paul Arne Niclas Nylén
- Birth name: Paul Arne Niclas Larsson
- Date of birth: 21 March 1966 (age 60)
- Place of birth: Malmö, Sweden
- Height: 1.80 m (5 ft 11 in)
- Position: Defensive midfielder

Senior career*
Years	Team	Apps	(Gls)
1984	BK Olympic	7	(1)
1984–1985	Vojvodina	2	(0)
1985–1987	BK Olympic	42	(8)
1987–1994	Malmö FF	159	(15)
1994–1995	Ayr United	2	(0)
1995–1996	Malmö FF	38	(1)
1996	Stuttgarter Kickers	12	(1)
1997	Cosenza	7	(0)
1997	Dalian Wanda FC	15	(2)
1998	Halmstads BK	9	(2)
1998–1999	VfB Leipzig	32	(2)
Total		325	(32)

International career
1989–1990	Sweden	8	(1)
- * Club domestic league appearances and goals

Paul Arne Niclas Nylén (né Larsson; born 21 March 1966) is a Swedish former professional footballer who played as a midfielder. He won eight caps for the Sweden national team and was a squad member at the 1990 FIFA World Cup.

== Club career ==
After some early experiences at local BK Olympic and Yugoslav team FK Vojvodina he signed in 1987 with Malmö FF, a stronghold of Swedish football. He played almost a decade with Malmö winning three Swedish championships and one cup. In 1994, he had a one-season spell with Scottish second league Ayr United F.C. In 1996, he left Malmö and decide to play abroad spending first six months of the 1996–97 season playing in German 2. Bundesliga club Stuttgarter Kickers before moving to Italy to play the rest of the season with Cosenza Calcio 1914. In 1997, he accepted the challenge to join his former Malmö and national team colleague Jens Fjellström to sign with Dalian Wanda FC. After this one year Chinese adventure, he still played one season back in Sweden with Halmstads BK before retiring in 1999 playing with German lower league VfB Leipzig.

In 1990, he changed his name to Nylén, before that he was known as Niclas Larsson.

== International career ==
Nylén played for the Sweden national team between 1989 and 1990, and played a total of eight matches and scored once. He was member of the Swedish team at the 1990 FIFA World Cup.

== Career statistics ==
=== International ===
Appearances and goals by national team and year
National team	Year	Apps	Goals
Sweden	1989	5	1
Sweden	1990	3	0
Total		8	1

Scores and results list Sweden's goal tally first, score column indicates score after each Nyhlén goal.

List of international goals scored by Niclas Nyhlén
No.	Date	Venue	Opponent	Score	Result	Competition	Ref.
1	7 May 1989	Råsunda Stadium, Solna, Sweden	Poland	2–1	2–1	1990 FIFA World Cup qualifier	

== Honours ==
Malmö FF

- Allsvenskan: 1987, 1988, 1989
- Svenska Cupen: 1988–89

Dalian Wanda FC

- Jia A: 1997
- Chinese Super Cup: 1997

Sporting positions
Preceded by Torbjörn Persson	Malmö FF; Captain; 1996	Succeeded by Jonnie Fedel
