= Prawitz =

Prawitz is a surname. Notable people with the name include:

- Dag Prawitz (born 1936), Swedish philosopher and logician
- Elsa Prawitz (1932–2001), Swedish film and stage actress
- Eva Prawitz (1920–2013), German pair skater and ice dancer

== See also ==
- Hartwig Edmund Prawitz Öberg (1930–1995), Swedish footballer
