= Rolf Björklund (footballer) =

Swedish footballer (born 1938)

Personal information
- Full name: Rolf Björklund
- Date of birth: 2 October 1938 (age 88)
- Place of birth: Sweden
- Position: Defender

Senior career*
Years	Team	Apps	(Gls)
1960–1970	Malmö FF	192	(1)

International career
1965–1967	Sweden	12	(0)
- * Club domestic league appearances and goals

Rolf Björklund (born 2 October 1938) is a Swedish former footballer who played his entire career at Malmö FF as a defender.

Sporting positions
Preceded by Anders Svensson	Malmö FF; Captain; 1969–1970	Succeeded by Krister Kristensson
