= Prawitz Öberg =

Swedish footballer

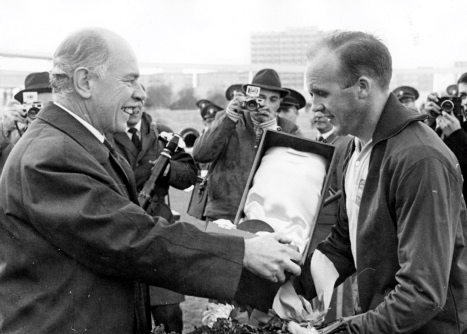
- Öberg (right) receiving an award

Personal information
- Full name: Hartwig Edmund Prawitz Öberg
- Date of birth: 16 November 1930
- Place of birth: Gislöv, Sweden
- Date of death: 4 November 1995 (aged 64)
- Place of death: Malmö, Sweden
- Position: Defender

Youth career
- 1940–1944: Gislövs IF
- 1945–1948: Trelleborgs FF

Senior career*
Years	Team	Apps	(Gls)
1949–1950	Gislövs IF		
1951–1952	IFK Trelleborg		
1952–1965	Malmö FF	278	(34)
1966	Gunnarstorps IF		

International career
1957–1964	Sweden	26	(5)

Managerial career
- 1966–1967: Gunnarstorps IF
- 1968–1969: Lunds BK
- 1970–1971: Gunnarstorps IF
- 1972: Anderslövs BoIK
- 1976–1978: Trelleborgs FF
- Malmö BI
- Limhamns IF
Medal record
Men's Football
Representing Sweden
FIFA World Cup
Runner-up	1958 Sweden
- * Club domestic league appearances and goals

Hartwig Edmund Prawitz Öberg (16 November 1930 – 4 November 1995) was a Swedish footballer, who was named Swedish Player of the Year in 1962. He was a very flexible player position-wise, and during his career he played as a defender, midfielder and forward.

== Club career ==
Öberg began his career with Gislövs IF, from the small town that he grew up in. He later joined the youth ranks of Trelleborgs FF, but after the club neglected to promote him to the senior team he chose to return to Gislövs IF. Following his stint with Gislöv, he signed for IFK Trelleborg, crosstown rivals of Trelleborgs FF. During his youth he was also a bantamweight boxer.

In 1952 Öberg signed for Malmö FF. According to Öberg's brother Wincent, Malmö FF chairman Eric Persson visited the family in their home and offered Öberg a new bicycle, 5 000 SEK, and a league win bonus. In his first season the club won the league, and Öberg went on to play more than 500 games in total for Malmö FF, also scoring more than 100 goals despite primarily playing as a left-back or midfielder. In 1962 he won the Guldbollen award as the player of the year in Sweden. Öberg finally won another Allsvenskan championship in 1965, after which he decided to wind down his playing career with newcomers Gunnarstorps IF in the second tier.

== International career ==
Öberg received twenty-six caps and five goals for the Sweden national team. He was a part of the Sweden squad that finished as runners-up in the 1958 FIFA World Cup. He played 0 games however, and acted as a back-up to Sven Axbom.

== Managerial career ==
As the player-manager of newly promoted second tier side Gunnarstorps IF, the club nearly won immediate promotion to Allsvenskan, losing out in the promotion qualifiers. He later went on to coach many southwestern Scanian teams such as Lunds BK, Anderslövs BoIK, Malmö BI, Limhamns IF and Trelleborgs FF.

Öberg died in Malmö on 4 November 1995 at the age of 64.

== Honours ==
=== Player ===
Sweden

- FIFA World Cup: runner-up 1958

Malmö FF

- Allsvenskan: 1952–53, 1965
- Svenska Cupen: 1953,

Individual

- Guldbollen: 1962

=== Manager ===
Gunnarstorps IF

- Division 2 Södra Götaland

Sporting positions
Preceded by Tore Svensson	Malmö FF; Captain; 1962–1965	Succeeded by Jörgen Ohlin
