= Jörgen Ohlin =

Swedish footballer (1937–2013)

Personal information
- Full name: Jörgen Ohlin
- Date of birth: 19 December 1937
- Date of death: 21 March 2013 (aged 75)
- Position: Defender

Senior career*
Years	Team	Apps	(Gls)
1956–1967	Malmö FF	147	(5)
- * Club domestic league appearances and goals

Jörgen Ohlin (19 December 1937 – 21 March 2013) was a Swedish footballer who played as a defender.

Sporting positions
Preceded by Prawitz Öberg	Malmö FF; Captain; 1966	Succeeded by Anders Svensson
