= Torbjörn Persson =

Swedish footballer and coach

Personal information
- Full name: Torbjörn Persson
- Date of birth: 14 January 1960 (age 66)
- Place of birth: Helsingborg, Sweden
- Position: Defender

Youth career
- –1979: Ramlösa

Senior career*
Years	Team	Apps	(Gls)
1980–1995	Malmö FF	574	(39)
1995–1997	Högaborgs BK		

International career
	Sweden	8	(0)

Managerial career
- 1997–2000: Ramlösa
- * Club domestic league appearances and goals

Torbjörn Persson (born 14 January 1960) is a Swedish former footballer and coach.

== Career ==
Persson played 574 matches for Malmö FF. He became Swedish champion two times and capped 8 times for the national team. Persson holds the record for most Allsvenskan wins for Malmö FF having been at the club when they won Allsvenskan five times in a row between 1985 and 1989. However, as Allsvenskan had championship playoffs at the time and Mamö FF managed to win two of them Persson only won two Swedish championships although having won the league five times.

After his player career he briefly started a coach career, now he is an IT specialist working at Alfa Laval Lund AB.

Sporting positions
Preceded by Per Ågren	Malmö FF; Captain; 1993-1995	Succeeded by Niclas Nyhlén
