= Erik Nilsson =

Swedish footballer

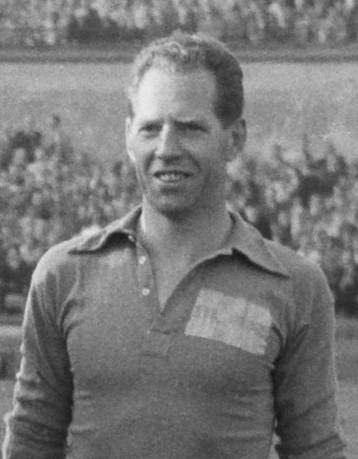
- Erik Nilsson in May 1952

Personal information
- Full name: Erik Henry Sixten Nilsson
- Date of birth: 6 August 1916
- Place of birth: Limhamn, Sweden
- Date of death: 9 September 1995 (aged 79)
- Place of death: Höllviken, Sweden
- Height: 1.75 m (5 ft 9 in)
- Position: Left back

Youth career
- –1933: Limhamns IF

Senior career*
Years	Team	Apps	(Gls)
1934–1953	Malmö FF	326	(2)

International career
1938–1952	Sweden	57	(0)
Medal record
Representing Sweden
Olympic Games
Gold medal – first place	1948 London
Bronze medal – third place	1952 Helsinki
FIFA World Cup
Third place	1950 Brazil
- * Club domestic league appearances and goals

Erik Henry Sixten Nilsson (6 August 1916 – 9 September 1995) was a Swedish footballer who played as a left back. Nilsson played his youth days with Limhamns IF, before he moved in 1934 to Allsvenskan club Malmö FF, where he played until 1953. There he won five league titles and five Swedish Cups. During his playing days he rejected an offer from A.C. Milan.

== Career ==
Nilsson played 57 times for the Sweden men's national football team, and participated in several international tournaments. He played in the 1938 FIFA World Cup, where Sweden finished fourth. He took part in the 1948 London Olympics, where Sweden celebrated its best international result with a gold medal, defeating Yugoslavia 3–1 in the final. Two years later he competed in the 1950 FIFA World Cup where Sweden finished third, thus becoming one of only two players to play in World Cups before and after World War II (the other being Switzerland's Alfred Bickel). In the 1950 World Cup, Nilsson was also elected into the All-Star team of the tournament. He won another medal in the 1952 Helsinki Olympics, where Sweden won the bronze after defeating Germany 2–0.

In 1950, Nilsson was awarded the Guldbollen as the year's best Swedish football player. In 2003, he was inducted into the SFS Hall Of Fame.

== Honours ==
Malmö FF

- Swedish Champions: 1943–44, 1948–49, 1949–50, 1950–51, 1952–53
- Division 2 Södra: 1934–35, 1935–36
- Svenska Cupen: 1944, 1946, 1947, 1951, 1953

Sweden

- 1948 Summer Olympics: gold medal winner
- 1952 Summer Olympics: bronze medal third place
- 1950 FIFA World Cup: third place
- 1938 FIFA World Cup: fourth place

Individual

- FIFA World Cup All-Star Team: 1950
- Guldbollen: 1950
- SFS Hall Of Fame: 2003

Sporting positions
Preceded by Helge Bengtsson	Malmö FF; Captain; 1949–1953	Succeeded by Sven Hjertsson
