= Nils Cederborg =

Swedish footballer

Personal information
- Full name: Nils Villy Cederborg
- Date of birth: 15 November 1925
- Place of birth: Nynäshamn, Sweden
- Date of death: 21 May 2001 (aged 75)
- Place of death: Stockholm, Sweden

Senior career*
Years	Team	Apps	(Gls)
- Djurgårdens IF

International career
1949	Sweden B	1	(0)
- * Club domestic league appearances and goals

Nils Villy Cederborg (15 November 1925 — 21 May 2001) is a Swedish former footballer. He made 102 Allsvenskan appearances for Djurgårdens IF and scored 42 goals.
