= Hilmer Pettersson =

Swedish footballer

Personal information
- Date of birth: February 22, 1925 (age 101)

Senior career*
Years	Team	Apps	(Gls)
1950–1952	Djurgården	19	(8)
- * Club domestic league appearances and goals

Hilmer "Kinesen" Pettersson (born 22 February 1925) is a Swedish retired footballer. Pettersson made 19 Allsvenskan appearances for Djurgården and scored 8 goals.
