= Anders Svensson (footballer, born 1939) =

Swedish footballer (1939–2007)

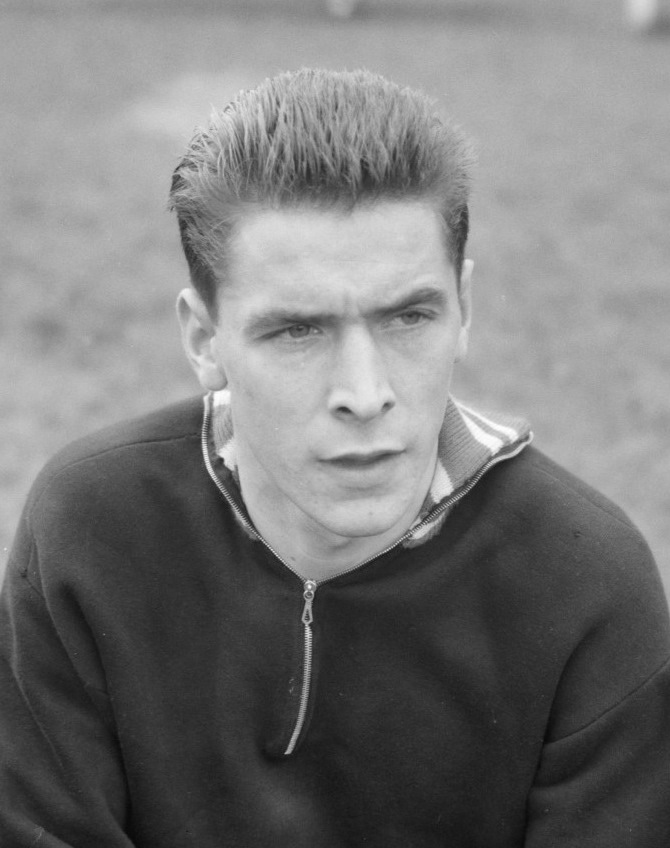

Personal information
- Full name: Anders Svensson
- Date of birth: 27 March 1939
- Place of birth: Teckomatorp, Sweden
- Date of death: 6 December 2007 (aged 68)
- Place of death: Bjärred, Sweden
- Position: Midfielder

Youth career
- Teckomatorp

Senior career*
Years	Team	Apps	(Gls)
1957–1959	Malmö FF		
1959–1963	PSV		
1963–1967	Örgryte IS		
1967–1969	Malmö FF		

International career
	Sweden	1	(0)
- * Club domestic league appearances and goals

Anders Svensson (27 March 1939 – 6 December 2007) was a Swedish footballer who played as a midfielder. He played for Malmö FF, PSV and Örgryte IS during his career, and was capped once for Sweden.

Sporting positions
Preceded by Jörgen Ohlin	Malmö FF; Captain; 1967–1968	Succeeded by Rolf Björklund
