= Arne Hjertsson =

Swedish footballer

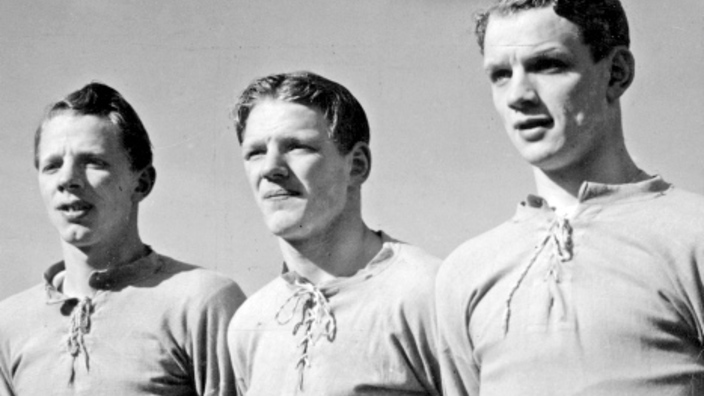
- The Hjertsson brothers 1944. From left Arne, Kjell and Sven.

Personal information
- Full name: Arne Hjertsson
- Date of birth: 4 September 1918
- Place of birth: Sweden
- Date of death: 12 June 1987 (aged 68)
- Place of death: Sweden
- Position: Forward

Senior career*
Years	Team	Apps	(Gls)
1936–1944	Malmö FF	17	(11)
- * Club domestic league appearances and goals

Arne Hjertsson (4 September 1918 – 12 June 1987) was a Swedish footballer who played as a forward.
