= Gunnar Martinsson =

Swedish footballer

Personal information
- Full name: Gunnar Martinsson
- Position: Midfielder

Senior career*
Years	Team	Apps	(Gls)
1926–1938	Malmö FF	119	(6)
- * Club domestic league appearances and goals

Gunnar Martinsson was a Swedish footballer who played as a midfielder.
