= Berndt Ivegren =

Swedish footballer

Personal information
- Birth name: Bernt Elof Johansson
- Date of birth: 21 September 1923
- Date of death: 11 September 2009 (aged 85)
- Place of death: Huddinge

Senior career*
Years	Team	Apps	(Gls)
1938–1949	Värtan		
1949–1954	Djurgården		

International career
1950	Sweden B	2	(0)
1951	Sweden	1	(0)
- * Club domestic league appearances and goals

Berndt Ivegren (21 September 1923 – 11 September 2009) was a Swedish footballer. He played in Allsvenskan for Djurgården

== Career ==
Ivegren, born 21 September 1923, represented Värtan and Djurgården. He made 88 Allsvenskan appearances for Djurgården and scored 0 goals.

He made his international debut for Sweden on 2 September 1951 against Sweden after having made 2 appearances for the national B team of Sweden in 1950.

Ivegren died 11 September 2009 in Huddinge.
