= Einar Mårtensson =

Swedish footballer

Personal information
- Full name: Einar Mårtensson
- Position: Forward

Senior career*
Years	Team	Apps	(Gls)
1945–1952	Malmö FF	22	(7)
- * Club domestic league appearances and goals

Einar Mårtensson was a Swedish footballer who played as a forward.
