= Georg Österlin =

Swedish footballer

Personal information
- Full name: Georg Österlin
- Position: Defender

Senior career*
Years	Team	Apps	(Gls)
1932–1942	Malmö FF	149	(6)
- * Club domestic league appearances and goals

Georg Österlin was a Swedish footballer who played as a defender.
