= Per Ågren =

Swedish footballer

Personal information
- Full name: Per Jonas Sven Ågren
- Date of birth: 12 April 1962 (age 64)
- Place of birth: Sweden
- Position: Defender

Youth career
- –1983: Malmö FF

Senior career*
Years	Team	Apps	(Gls)
1983–1992	Malmö FF	145	(1)
1993	Helsingborgs IF	11	(1)
Total		156	(2)

International career
1992	Sweden U21	2	(0)
- * Club domestic league appearances and goals

Per Jonas Sven Ågren (born 12 April 1962) is a Swedish former footballer who played as a defender.

== Club career ==
Ågren represented Malmö FF for most of his career and served as club captain for the club between 1989 and 1992. He played a total of 329 games for the club, and won two Swedish Championships and three Svenska Cupen titles during his time at Malmö.

Ågren finished up his career with a final season with rivals Helsingborgs IF.

== International career ==
Ågren appeared twice for the Sweden U21 team in 1992.

== Post-playing career ==
After his playing career Ågren worked within the Swedish Football Association and a civil career inside banking. Ågren held the position of director of sports for Malmö FF between 2011 and 2013.

== Personal life ==
He is the father of San José Earthquakes defender Oskar Ågren.

== Honours ==
Malmö FF

- Swedish Champion: 1986, 1988
- Allsvenskan: 1985, 1986, 1987, 1988, 1989
- Svenska Cupen: 1983–84, 1985–86, 1988–89

Sporting positions
Preceded by Roger Ljung	Malmö FF; Captain; 1989-1992	Succeeded by Torbjörn Persson
