= Ingvar Svahn =

Swedish footballer

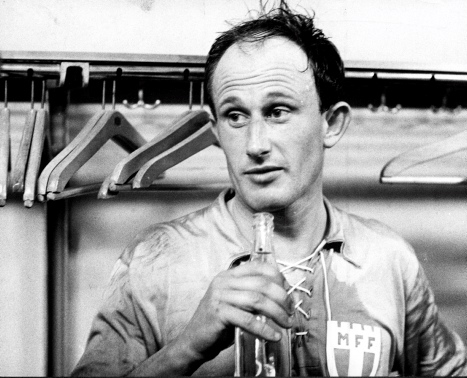
- Ingvar Svahn in 1967

Personal information
- Full name: Ingvar Svahn
- Date of birth: 22 May 1938
- Place of birth: Malmö, Sweden
- Date of death: 16 June 2008 (aged 70)
- Place of death: Malmö, Sweden
- Position: Midfielder

Youth career
- –1957: Kulladals FF

Senior career*
Years	Team	Apps	(Gls)
1957–1968	Malmö FF	217	(62)
1968–1970	Royal Daring		
1970	Malmö FF	11	(1)
1971–1972	Eslövs BK		

International career
1959–1961	Sweden U21	3	(3)
1958–1965	Sweden B	13	(1)
1961–1970	Sweden	19	(2)
- * Club domestic league appearances and goals

Ingvar Svahn (22 May 1938 – 16 June 2008) was a Swedish footballer who played as a midfielder.

== Career ==
Svahn played 255 matches for Malmö FF. He became Swedish champion three times and capped 19 times for the national team. In 1967, Svahn won the award for Swedish Footballer of the Year, Guldbollen. Svahn was known for being a fair player, he wasn't given a red or yellow card for ten seasons.
