= Lars Granström =

Swedish footballer

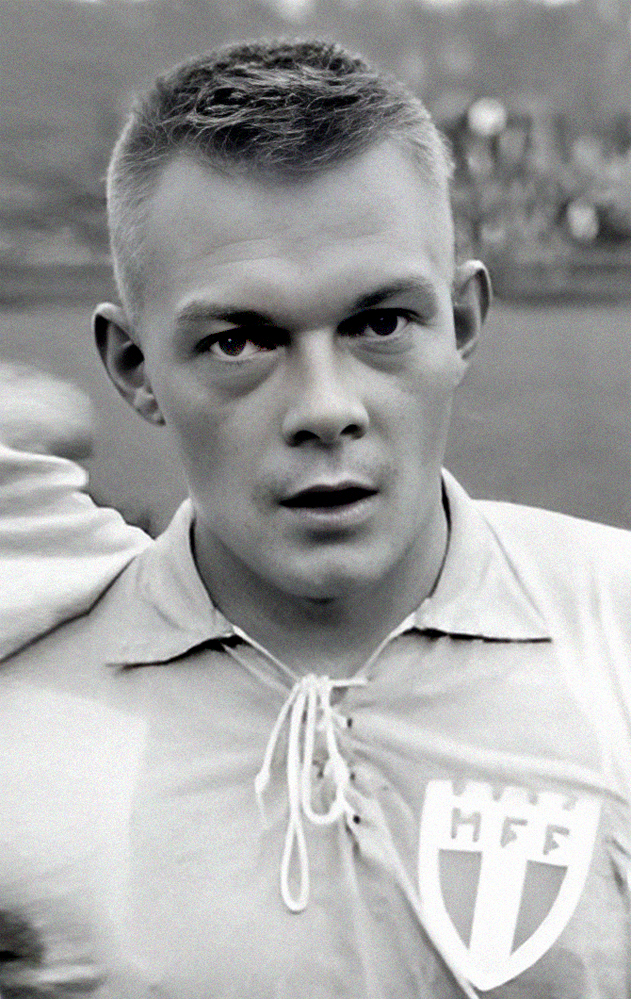
- Lars Granström in 1965

Personal information
- Full name: Lars Georg Granström
- Date of birth: 8 December 1942 (age 83)
- Place of birth: Helsingborg, Sweden
- Position: Forward

Youth career
- Stattena IF
- Malmö FF

Senior career*
Years	Team	Apps	(Gls)
1960–1966	Malmö FF	118	(41)
1966–1967	Karlsruher SC	3	(0)
1967–1971	Malmö FF	84	(11)
Total		205	(52)

International career
1960	Sweden U19	3	(4)
1961–1964	Sweden U21	8	(3)
1965	Sweden B	1	(0)
1965	Sweden	1	(2)
- * Club domestic league appearances and goals

Lars Georg Granström (born 8 December 1942) is a Swedish former professional footballer who played the majority of his career at Malmö FF as a forward. He also played professionally in Germany at Karlsruher SC. He won one cap for the Sweden national team in 1965, scoring two goals.

== Career statistics ==
=== International ===
Appearances and goals by national team and year
National team	Year	Apps	Goals
Sweden	1965	1	2
Total		1	2

Scores and results list Sweden's goal tally first, score column indicates score after each Granström goal.

List of international goals scored by Lars Granström
No.	Date	Venue	Opponent	Score	Result	Competition	Ref.
1	7 November 1965	Dr. Fazil Kucuk Stadium, Famagusta, Cyprus	Cyprus	1–0	5–0	1966 FIFA World Cup qualifier	
2	7 November 1965	Dr. Fazil Kucuk Stadium, Famagusta, Cyprus	Cyprus	2–0	5–0	1966 FIFA World Cup qualifier	
