= Arne Månsson =

Swedish footballer

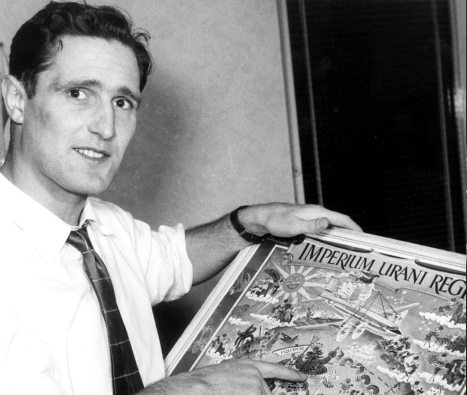
- Månsson in 1954

Personal information
- Date of birth: 11 November 1925
- Place of birth: Sweden
- Date of death: 11 January 2003 (aged 77)
- Position: Defender

Senior career*
| Years | Team | Apps | (Gls) |
- Malmö FF

International career
| 1949-1950 | Sweden | 2 | (0) |
Medal record
Representing Sweden
FIFA World Cup
| Third place | 1950 Brazil |
- * Club domestic league appearances and goals

Arne Månsson (11 November 1925 – 11 January 2003) was a Swedish football defender who played for Sweden in the 1950 FIFA World Cup. He also played for Malmö FF.
