= Stig Carlsson (footballer) =

Swedish association football player

Senior career*
Years	Team	Apps	(Gls)
- Djurgården
- * Club domestic league appearances and goals

Stig Carlsson is a Swedish retired footballer. Carlsson made 54 Allsvenskan appearances for Djurgården and scored 4 goals.
