= Sune Sandbring =

Swedish footballer (1928–2021)

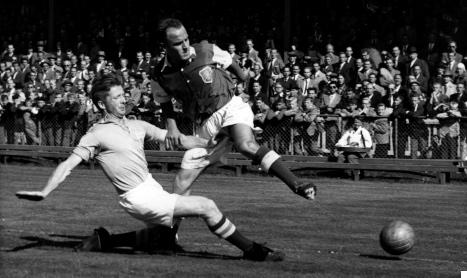
- Sune Sandbring (left) in a game with Frank Jacobsson from GAIS in the Allsvenskan 1953

Personal information
- Full name: Sune Sandbring
- Date of birth: 10 April 1928
- Place of birth: Malmö, Sweden
- Date of death: 1 October 2021 (aged 93)
- Position: Defender

Senior career*
Years	Team	Apps	(Gls)
1949–1958	Malmö FF	153	(0)

International career
1953–1954	Sweden	6	(0)
- * Club domestic league appearances and goals

Sune Sandbring (10 April 1928 – 1 October 2021) was a Swedish footballer who played his entire career at Malmö FF as a defender.

Sporting positions
Preceded by Sven Hjertsson	Malmö FF; Captain; 1954–1958	Succeeded by Tore Svensson
