= Tore Svensson =

Swedish footballer

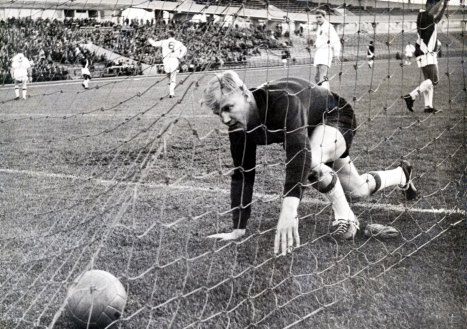
- Tore Svensson

Personal information
- Date of birth: 6 December 1927
- Place of birth: Sweden
- Date of death: 26 April 2002 (aged 74)
- Position: Goalkeeper

Senior career*
| Years | Team | Apps | (Gls) |
- Malmö FF

International career
| 1956-1958 | Sweden | 4 | (0) |
Medal record
Representing Sweden
FIFA World Cup
| Third place | 1950 Brazil |
| Runner-up | 1958 Sweden |
- * Club domestic league appearances and goals

Tore Svensson (6 December 1927 – 26 April 2002) was a Swedish football goalkeeper who played for Malmö FF. He also represented Team Sweden in the 1950 and 1958 FIFA World Cups in Brazil respectively Sweden. He was also part of Sweden's squad at the 1952 Summer Olympics, but he did not play in any matches.

Sporting positions
| Preceded by Sune Sandbring | Malmö FF; Captain; 1959–1961 | Succeeded by Prawitz Öberg |
