= 1965 Allsvenskan =

41st season of Allsvenskan

Allsvenskan
- Season: 1965
- Champions: Malmö FF
- Relegated: Hammarby IF; GIF Sundsvall
- European Cup: Malmö FF
- Top goalscorer: Bo Larsson, Malmö FF (28)
- Average attendance: 10,633

Statistics of Allsvenskan in season 1965.

== Overview ==
The league was contested by 12 teams, with Malmö FF winning the championship.

== League table ==
Pos	Team	Pld	W	D	L	GF	GA	GD	Pts	Qualification or relegation
1	Malmö FF (C)	22	15	4	3	64	24	+40	34	Qualification to European Cup first round
2	IF Elfsborg	22	13	6	3	52	20	+32	32	
3	AIK	22	12	6	4	40	29	+11	30	
4	IFK Norrköping	22	9	10	3	41	25	+16	28	
5	IFK Göteborg	22	9	7	6	31	35	−4	25	
6	Örebro SK	22	5	13	4	23	27	−4	23	
7	Örgryte IS	22	8	5	9	52	42	+10	21	
8	Djurgårdens IF	22	7	6	9	40	34	+6	20	
9	Degerfors IF	22	6	4	12	29	41	−12	16	
10	Hälsingborgs IF	22	4	8	10	28	59	−31	16	
11	Hammarby IF (R)	22	5	3	14	36	48	−12	13	Relegation to Division 2
12	GIF Sundsvall (R)	22	1	4	17	19	71	−52	6	Relegation to Division 2

Rules for classification: 1) points; 2) goal difference; 3) number of goals scored.
(C) Champions; (R) Relegated

== Results ==
Home \ Away	AIK	DEG	DJU	GIF	HAIF	HÄIF	IFE	IFKG	IFKN	MFF	ÖSK	ÖIS
AIK		3–1	1–0	1–0	1–1	3–3	1–5	0–1	0–3	2–2	1–0	2–1
Degerfors IF	0–2		4–2	3–0	2–1	1–1	0–3	2–4	0–1	1–2	0–1	4–3
Djurgårdens IF	2–2	2–0		4–1	2–0	6–1	1–2	2–1	1–1	0–3	1–1	3–1
GIF Sundsvall	2–3	2–4	1–6		3–1	1–1	0–1	0–1	1–1	1–4	1–1	0–5
Hammarby IF	1–8	0–1	2–1	6–0		3–1	2–3	1–1	2–4	1–3	0–1	5–2
Hälsingborgs IF	0–2	2–1	0–0	2–2	2–1		1–0	2–4	2–2	1–10	1–1	1–4
IF Elfsborg	1–2	2–2	2–0	8–1	2–1	4–0		6–0	0–2	3–1	0–0	4–1
IFK Göteborg	3–1	1–0	1–0	2–1	2–2	2–3	0–0		1–0	2–2	3–3	1–4
IFK Norrköping	0–1	1–1	2–1	5–0	1–0	2–2	2–2	2–0		4–2	1–1	1–1
Malmö FF	1–1	4–1	2–2	4–0	3–1	5–0	1–2	3–0	3–2		2–0	3–0
Örebro SK	1–1	1–1	0–0	3–1	0–4	2–1	1–1	1–1	1–1	0–3		4–3
Örgryte IS	1–2	3–0	6–4	5–1	5–1	3–1	1–1	0–0	3–3	0–1	0–0	

Legend: Blue = home team win; Yellow = draw; Red = away team win.

== Attendances ==
#	Club	Average	Highest
1	AIK	15,817	30,180
2	Örgryte IS	14,078	31,573
3	IFK Göteborg	13,631	32,363
4	Malmö FF	13,230	25,708
5	IF Elfsborg	12,608	19,137
6	IFK Norrköping	11,839	23,012
7	Djurgårdens IF	9,648	26,747
8	GIF Sundsvall	8,783	15,381
9	Hammarby IF	8,303	20,341
10	Örebro SK	6,816	11,509
11	Hälsingborgs IF	6,699	12,199
12	Degerfors IF	5,647	8,050
