= Jonnie Fedel =

Swedish footballer

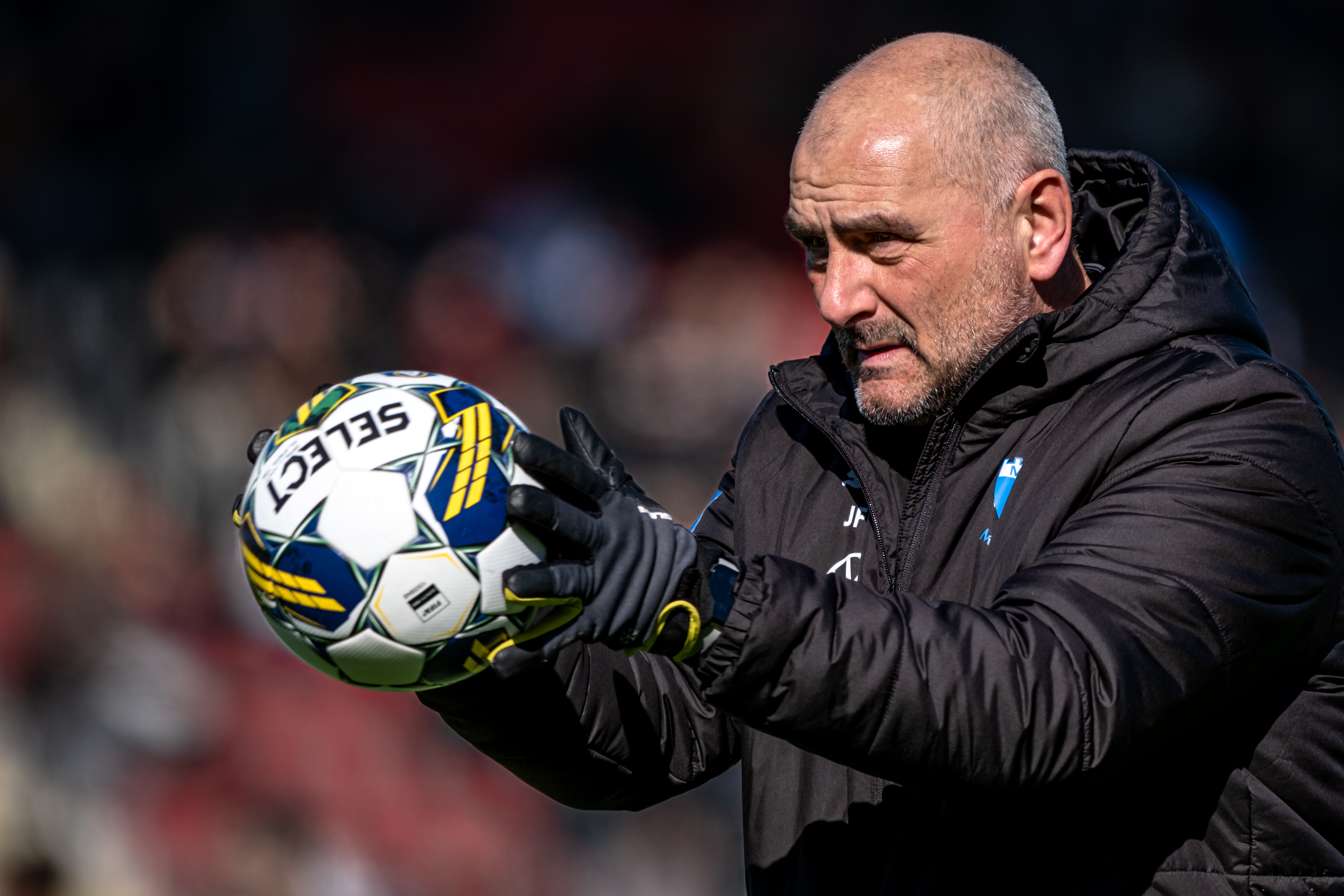
- Fedel as goalkeeper coach for Malmö FF in 2023

Personal information
- Full name: Jonnie Luigi Fedel
- Date of birth: 22 November 1966 (age 59)
- Place of birth: Malmö, Sweden
- Position: Goalkeeper

Team information
- Current team: Malmö FF (goalkeeping coach)

Youth career
- –1984: Malmö FF

Senior career*
Years	Team	Apps	(Gls)
1984–2001	Malmö FF	276	(1)
2001–2004	Höllvikens GIF		
2002–2003	→ Halmstad (loan)	0	(0)
2004–2006	NK Croatia Đakovo		

International career
1986	Sweden U21	1	(0)
1996	Sweden B	1	(0)
1992–1996	Sweden	2	(0)

Managerial career
- 2006–: Malmö FF (goalkeeping coach)
- * Club domestic league appearances and goals

Jonnie Luigi Fedel (born 22 November 1966) is a Swedish former professional footballer who played as a goalkeeper. He serves as a goalkeeping coach for Allsvenskan club Malmö FF. He spent almost his entire playing career at Malmö FF.

== International career ==
Fedel won two caps for the Sweden national team, making his debut in 1992 in a friendly game against Australia. He won his second cap in a friendly game against South Korea in 1996, replacing Bengt Andersson in goal at half time.

== Career statistics ==
Appearances and goals by national team and year
National team	Year	Apps	Goals
Sweden	1992	1	0
Sweden	1993	0	0
Sweden	1994	0	0
Sweden	1995	0	0
Sweden	1996	1	0
Total		2	0

== Honours ==
Malmö FF

- Swedish Champion: 1986, 1988
- Svenska Cupen: 1985–86, 1988–89

== External sources ==
- Malmö FF profile (in Swedish)
- Jonnie Fedel at the Swedish Football Association (in Swedish)
