= Helge Bengtsson =

Swedish footballer (1916–2001)

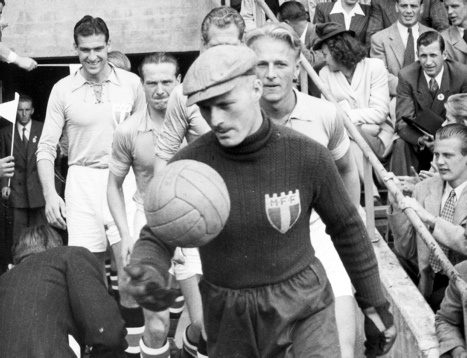
- Helge Bengtsson with Malmö FF in 1945

Personal information
- Full name: Helge Bengtsson
- Date of birth: 19 December 1916
- Place of birth: Malmö, Sweden
- Date of death: 10 February 2001 (aged 84)
- Place of death: Malmö, Sweden
- Position: Goalkeeper

Senior career*
| Years | Team | Apps | (Gls) |
| 1934–1951 | Malmö FF | 265 | (3) |

International career
| 1949 | Sweden | 1 | (0) |
- * Club domestic league appearances and goals

Karl Helge Bengtsson (19 December 1916 – 10 February 2001) was a Swedish footballer. He was nicknamed "Gripen" and was rarely referred to with his first name when he played.

== Career ==
Born in Malmö, Bengtsson played for Malmö FF his entire career and was the first choice goalkeeper for the team throughout the 1940s. He was part of the team which went undefeated during 49 games between 1949 and 1951. After his retirement from playing he continued to be a part of the club, sitting in the board of directors and being first team coach between 1962 and 1965.

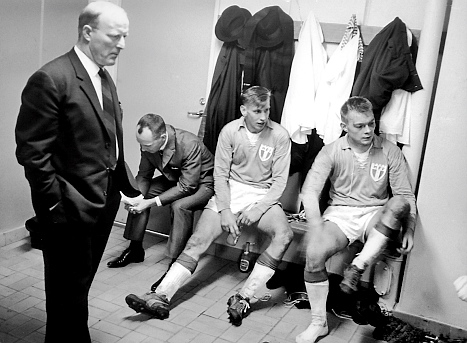
Bengtsson as first team coach with Bo Larsson and Lars Granström

Bengtsson also played one cap for Sweden in 1949. It is said that he played a national cap for Sweden previously in 1939, however this match was played against Arsenal and was not regarded as an international match.

In total Bengtsson played 501 games for Malmö FF and scored three goals in two matches in which he played as midfielder.

He died on 10 February 2001 in Malmö.

Sporting positions
| Preceded by Sture Mårtensson | Malmö FF; Captain; 1949 | Succeeded by Erik Nilsson |
