= Carl-Erik Sandberg =

Swedish footballer

Personal information
- Full name: Carl-Erik Sandberg
- Position: Forward

Senior career*
Years	Team	Apps	(Gls)
1938–1947	Malmö FF	156	(31)
- * Club domestic league appearances and goals

Carl-Erik Sandberg was a Swedish footballer who played as a forward.
