= Birger Rosengren =

Swedish footballer

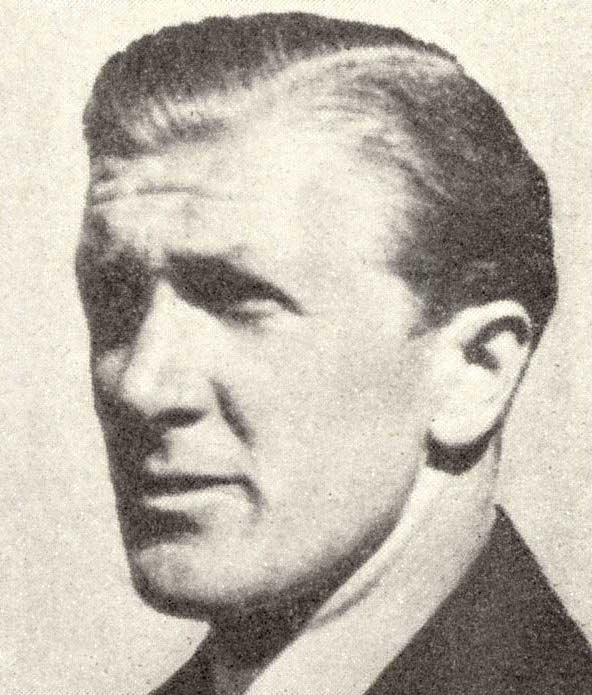

Personal information
- Date of birth: 29 October 1917
- Place of birth: Norrköping, Sweden
- Date of death: 15 October 1977 (aged 59)
- Place of death: Norrköping, Sweden
- Position: Midfielder

Senior career*
Years	Team	Apps	(Gls)
1935–1949	IFK Norrköping		

International career
1945–1948	Sweden	9	(0)
Medal record
Representing Sweden
Olympic Games
Gold medal – first place	1948 London	Team competition
- * Club domestic league appearances and goals

Birger Rosengren (29 October 1917 – 15 October 1977) was a Swedish international footballer who played for IFK Norrköping as a midfielder. During his club career, he won the national Swedish league (Allsvenskan) five times.

== International career ==
Rosengren played nine times for his home country, and as team captain he won the gold medal with the Swedish Olympic team at the 1948 Summer Olympics, at which he played in 4 games including the final.

== Honours ==
IFK Norrköping

- Allsvenskan: 1942–43, 1944–45, 1945–46, 1946–47, 1947–48
- Svenska Cupen: 1943, 1945

Sweden

- Summer Olympics: 1948
