= Åke Hansson (footballer, born 1927) =

Swedish footballer

Personal information
- Full name: Åke Hansson
- Date of birth: 7 May 1927
- Place of birth: Sweden
- Date of death: 6 September 2015 (aged 88)
- Position: Midfielder

Senior career*
Years	Team	Apps	(Gls)
1950–1957	Malmö FF	132	(14)
- * Club domestic league appearances and goals

Åke Hansson (7 May 1927 – 6 September 2015) was a Swedish footballer who played as a midfielder.
