= Sven Nilsson (footballer) =

Swedish footballer and manager

Personal information
- Full name: Sven Nilsson
- Date of birth: 15 June 1909
- Place of birth: Sweden
- Date of death: 5 March 1983 (aged 73)
- Position: Centre back

Senior career*
Years	Team	Apps	(Gls)
1931–1940	Malmö FF	172	(3)

International career
1937	Sweden	1	(0)

Managerial career
- 1944: Malmö FF
- 1945–1947: Malmö FF
- 1950: Malmö FF
- * Club domestic league appearances and goals

Sven Nilsson (15 June 1909 – 5 March 1983) was a Swedish football player and manager. He is most famous for being Malmö FF's manager during their first Championship season in 1944. Nilsson's son Bertil Nilsson is a former football player who himself played 342 matches for Malmö FF.

== Playing career ==
Nilsson played 302 matches in total (of which 172 were league matches) for Malmö FF and was one of the players who were banned in 1934 when the club was caught paying their players which was against the rules at the time. He was capped for Sweden once in a World Cup qualifier in Hamburg in 1937. Nilssons international career ended as he was called into the military as WWII raged through Europe.

== Manager career ==
After his player career Nilsson coached Malmö FF during three different periods. He was manager of the club in 1944 when they won their first Swedish Championship. Nilsson was also manager of the club from 1945 to 1947 and in 1950 between managers.

== Honours as manager ==
Malmö FF

- Allsvenskan (1): 1944
- Svenska Cupen (3): 1944, 1946, 1947
