= Kjell Hjertsson =

Swedish footballer (1922–2013)

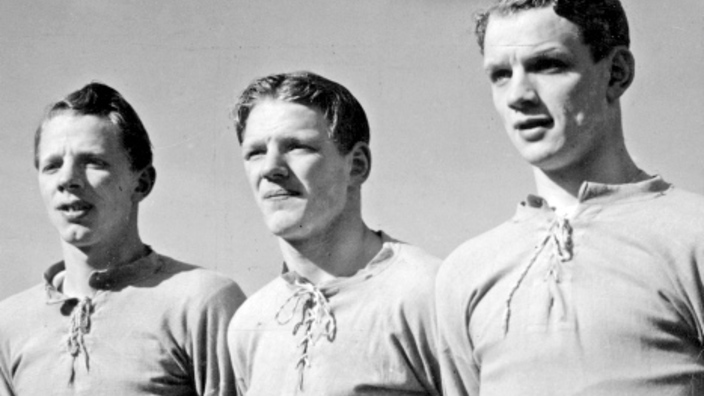
- The Hjertsson brothers 1944, from left: Arne, Kjell and Sven

Personal information
- Date of birth: 1 August 1922
- Place of birth: Sweden
- Date of death: 8 February 2013 (aged 90)
- Place of death: Sweden
- Position: Midfielder

Senior career*
Years	Team	Apps	(Gls)
1940–1950	Malmö FF	148	(3)
1950–1952	Råå IF		

International career
1946	Sweden	1	(0)
- * Club domestic league appearances and goals

Kjell Hjertsson (1 August 1922 – 8 February 2013) was a Swedish footballer who played his career at Malmö FF and Råå IF as a midfielder.

His brothers Arne Hjertsson and Sven Hjertsson were also footballers. He died 8 February 2013. In 1950 he was recruited to Råå IF, together with his Malmö FF clubmates Walle Ek and Gustaf Nilsson. With these reinforcements, Råå IF, immediately after promotion from the second tier, in the 1950–51 season, sensationally captured the top tier Allsvenskan's big silver medal.
