= Sture Mårtensson =

Swedish footballer

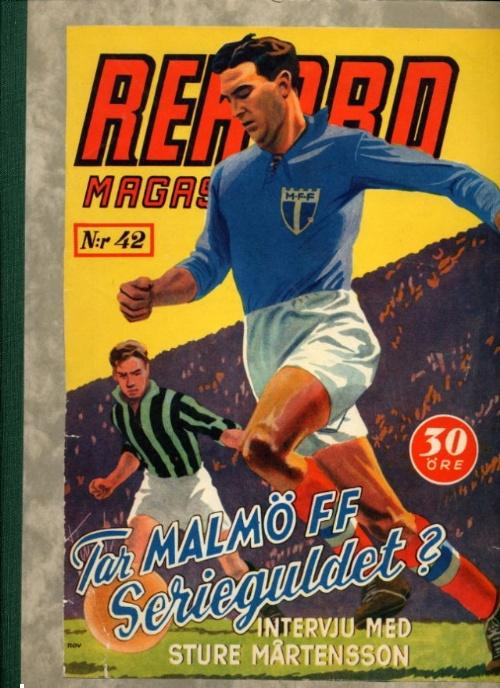
- Sture Mårtensson on the cover of Rekordmagasinet in 1943

Personal information
- Date of birth: 27 April 1916
- Place of birth: Malmö, Sweden
- Date of death: 15 February 2004 (aged 87)
- Place of death: Lomma, Sweden
- Position: Defender

Youth career
- Sjölunda IF

Senior career*
Years	Team	Apps	(Gls)
1937–1949	Malmö FF	221	(17)

International career
1943–1948	Sweden	3	(1)
- * Club domestic league appearances and goals

Sture Mårtensson (27 April 1916 – 15 February 2004) was a Swedish footballer who played his entire professional career at Malmö FF as a defender.

Sporting positions
Preceded by Position established	Malmö FF; Captain; 1940–1949	Succeeded by Helge Bengtsson
