= Sven Hjertsson =

Swedish footballer

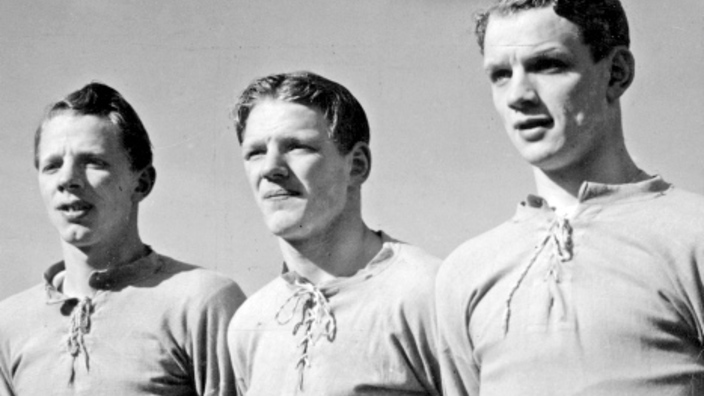
- The Hjertsson brothers 1944. From left Arne, Kjell and Sven.

Personal information
- Full name: Sven Hjertsson
- Date of birth: 7 March 1924
- Place of birth: Sweden
- Date of death: 12 November 1999 (aged 75)
- Place of death: Sweden
- Position: Defender

Senior career*
Years	Team	Apps	(Gls)
1942–1954	Malmö FF	156	(10)

International career
	Sweden	13	(0)
- * Club domestic league appearances and goals

Sven Hjertsson (7 March 1924 – 12 November 1999) was a Swedish footballer who played as a defender. He was also part of Sweden's squad at the 1952 Summer Olympics, but he did not play in any matches.

Sporting positions
Preceded by Erik Nilsson	Malmö FF; Captain; 1953–1954	Succeeded by Sune Sandbring
