= Hans Malmström =

Swedish footballer

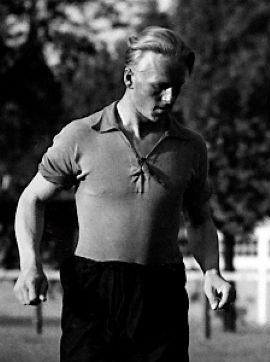

Personal information
- Full name: Hans Malmström
- Date of birth: 9 June 1921
- Place of birth: Sweden
- Date of death: 1994 (aged 72–73)
- Position: Defender

Senior career*
| Years | Team | Apps | (Gls) |
| 1942–1950 | Malmö FF | 107 | (0) |
| 1950–1954 | Helsingborgs IF | | |

International career
| 1946–1953 | Sweden | 12 | (0) |
- * Club domestic league appearances and goals

Hans Malmström (9 June 1921 – 1994) was a Swedish footballer who played as a defender.
