= Gustaf Nilsson (footballer, born 1922) =

Swedish footballer (1922–2004)

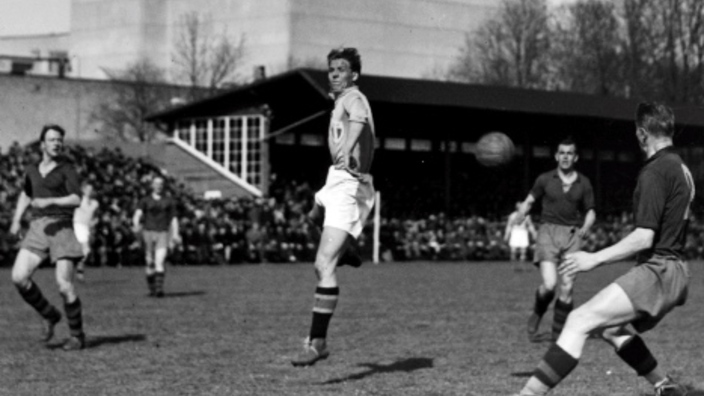
- Nilsson with Malmö FF in 1945

Personal information
- Date of birth: 20 October 1922
- Place of birth: Malmö, Sweden
- Date of death: 23 October 2004 (aged 82)
- Place of death: Sweden
- Position: Forward

Senior career*
Years	Team	Apps	(Gls)
1940–1950	Malmö FF	132	(65)
1950–1951	Råå IF	20	(11)

International career
1946	Sweden	1	(0)
- * Club domestic league appearances and goals

Gustaf Nilsson (20 October 1922 – 2004) was a Swedish footballer who played as a midfielder.
