= 1975 Svenska Cupen final =

- Event: 1974–75 Svenska Cupen
Malmö FF	Djurgårdens IF
1	0
- Date: 8 May 1975
- Venue: Malmö Stadion, Malmö
- Referee: Karl-Gösta Björkman (Lagan)
- Attendance: 6,913

The 1975 Svenska Cupen final took place on 8 May 1975 at Malmö Stadion in Malmö. The match was contested by Allsvenskan sides Malmö FF and Djurgårdens IF. Djurgården played their first final since 1951 and their second in total, Malmö FF played their third consecutive final and their 11th final in total. Malmö FF won their 9th title with a 1–0 victory.

== Match details ==
8 May 1975

Malmö FF	1–0	Djurgårdens IF
Andersson 47'

Malmö Stadion, Malmö
Attendance: 6,913
Referee: Karl-Gösta Björkman (Lagan)

Malmö FF	Djurgården

MALMÖ FF:
GK	(Sweden) Jan Möller
DF	(Sweden) Christer Jacobsson
DF	(Sweden) Krister Kristensson
DF	(Sweden) Roy Andersson
DF	(Sweden) Harry Jönsson
MF	(Sweden) Staffan Tapper
MF	(Sweden) Anders Ljungberg
MF	(Sweden) Bo Larsson
MF	(Sweden) Conny Andersson	(substituted off) 64'
FW	(Sweden) Thomas Sjöberg
FW	(Sweden) Tommy Larsson
Substitutes:
FW	(Sweden) Tore Cervin
MF	(Sweden) Christer Malmberg	(substituted in) 64'
Manager:
(England) Bob Houghton

DJURGÅRDENS IF:
GK	(Sweden) Björn Alkeby
DF	(Sweden) Roland Andersson
DF	(Sweden) Tommy Davidsson
DF	(Sweden) Birger Jakobson
DF	(Sweden) Tommy Berggren
MF	(Sweden) Curt Olsberg
MF	(Sweden) Sven Lindman
MF	(Sweden) Kjell Samuelsson
MF	(Sweden) Håkan Stenbäck
FW	(Sweden) Harry Svensson
FW	(Sweden) Kjell Karlsson	(substituted off) 65'
Substitutes:
FW	(Sweden) Per Lövfors	(substituted in) 65'
??	(Sweden) Per-Olof Erixon
Manager:
(Sweden) Bengt Persson
