= 2024 Svenska Cupen final =

2024 football match

- Event: 2023–24 Svenska Cupen
Malmö FF	Djurgårdens IF
1	1
- After extra time Malmö FF won 4–1 on penalties
- Date: 1 May 2024
- Venue: Eleda Stadion, Malmö
- Referee: Adam Ladebäck

The 2024 Svenska Cupen final was played on 1 May 2024 between Malmö FF and Djurgårdens IF at Eleda Stadion, Malmö, the home ground of Malmö FF, determined in a draw on 24 March 2024 after the semi-finals. The final was the culmination of the 2023–24 Svenska Cupen, the 68th season of Svenska Cupen and the twelfth season with the current format. Malmö FF won their sixteenth cup title after defeating Djurgården 4–1 on penalties after the match had ended 1–1 after extra time.

== Venue ==
Since the 2014–15 season, the venue for the Svenska Cupen final is decided in a draw between the two finalists. The draw for the final was held on 24 March 2024 and decided that the final would be played at Eleda Stadion, Malmö, the home ground of Malmö FF. This was the second cup final to be hosted at the venue, the previous one having been in 2016.

== Background ==
The winner qualifies for the Europa League first qualifying round. However, since Malmö FF won the 2023 Allsvenskan, they are already qualified for the Champions League second qualifying round. Since Malmö FF won the final, the Europa League spot was passed to the second-placed team in 2023 Allsvenskan, IF Elfsborg, and the second Conference League second qualifying round spot was passed to the fourth-placed team, Djurgårdens IF.

Malmö played their first final since 2022 and their 22nd in total. Djurgården played their first final since 2018 and their tenth in total. Both clubs won in their previous final appearances. Having met in 1951, 1975, 1989, and 2018, this was the fifth final to contest the two clubs. Malmö had won three of the prior meetings in the final of the competition while Djurgården had won one. The clubs faced each other once in Allsvenskan prior to the cup final, at Tele2 Arena on 25 April where Malmö won 1–0.

== Teams ==
Team	Previous finals appearances (bold indicates winners)
Malmö FF	21 (**1944**, 1945, **1946**, **1947**, **1951**, **1953**, **1967**, 1971, **1973**, **1974**, **1975**, **1978**, **1980**, **1984**, **1986**, **1989**, 1996, 2016, 2018, 2020, **2022**)
Djurgårdens IF	9 (1951, 1975, 1989, **1990**, **2002**, **2004**, **2005**, 2013, **2018**)

== Route to the final ==
Note: In all results below, the score of the finalist is given first (H: home; A: away).

Malmö FF		Round	Djurgårdens IF	
Opponent	Result	Initial rounds	Opponent	Result
Smedby AIS	2–0 (A)	Second round	Sandvikens IF	5–1 (A)
Opponent	Result	Group stage	Opponent	Result
Östers IF	2–0 (H)	Matchday 1	Skövde AIK	2–0 (H)
IFK Luleå	8–0 (A)	Matchday 2	Nordic United FC	5–0 (A)
Varbergs BoIS	1–1 (H)	Matchday 3	IFK Göteborg	3–0 (H)
**Group 1 winner**: Pos / Team / Pld / Pts; **1** / Malmö FF / **3** / **7**; 2 / Östers IF / 3 / **6**; 3 / Varbergs BoIS / 3 / **4**; 4 / IFK Luleå / 3 / **0**; Source: SvFF		Final standings	**Group 4 winner**: Pos / Team / Pld / Pts; **1** / Djurgårdens IF / **3** / **9**; 2 / IFK Göteborg / 3 / **6**; 3 / Skövde AIK / 3 / **3**; 4 / Nordic United FC / 3 / **0**; Source: SvFF	
Opponent	Result	Knockout stage	Opponent	Result
IFK Norrköping	5–2 (H)	Quarter-finals	Degerfors IF	3–0 (H)
Halmstads BK	4–0 (A)	Semi-finals	AIK	3–2 (p) (A)

== Match ==
=== Details ===
1 May 2024
14:00

Malmö FF (1)	1–1 (a.e.t.)	Djurgårdens IF (1)
Ali 70'	Report	Hümmet 78'
Penalties
Christiansen (penalty scored); Kiese Thelin (penalty scored); Olsson (penalty scored); Berg Johnsen (penalty scored)	4–1	(penalty scored) Danielson; (penalty missed) Radetinac; (penalty missed) Gulliksen

Eleda Stadion, Malmö
Referee: Adam Ladebäck
