= 1971 Svenska Cupen final =

- Event: 1970–71 Svenska Cupen
Åtvidabergs FF	Malmö FF
3	2
- Date: 30 June 1971
- Venue: Malmö Stadion, Malmö
- Referee: Bertil Lööw (Jönköping)
- Attendance: 7,544

The 1971 Svenska Cupen final took place on 30 June 1971 at Malmö Stadion in Malmö. The match was contested by Allsvenskan sides Malmö FF and Åtvidabergs FF. Åtvidaberg played their second consecutive final and their third final in total, Malmö FF played their first final since 1967 and their eighth final in total. Åtvidaberg won their second title with a 3–2 victory.

== Match details ==
30 June 1971

Åtvidabergs FF	3–2	Malmö FF
Sandberg 8', 19'; Ljungberg 40'		Jönsson 22'; Larsson 77'

Malmö Stadion, Malmö
Attendance: 7,544
Referee: Bertil Lööw (Jönköping)

Åtvidaberg	Malmö FF

ÅTVIDABERGS FF:
GK	(Sweden) Ulf Blomberg
DF	(Sweden) Jan Olsson
DF	(Sweden) Kent Karlsson
DF	(Sweden) Sten-Åke Andersson
DF	(Sweden) Conny Gustafsson
MF	(Sweden) Anders Ljungberg
MF	(Sweden) Conny Torstensson
MF	(Sweden) Veine Wallinder
MF	(Sweden) Roland Sandberg
FW	(Sweden) Ralf Edström
FW	(Sweden) Leif Franzén
Substitutes:
??	(Sweden) Lars Lundahl
FW	(Sweden) Benno Magnusson
Manager:
(Sweden) Sven-Agne Larsson

MALMÖ FF:
GK	(Sweden) Nils Hult
DF	(Sweden) Roland Andersson
DF	(Sweden) Krister Kristensson
DF	(Sweden) Staffan Tapper
DF	(Sweden) Ulf Kleander
MF	(Sweden) Roy Andersson
MF	(Sweden) Curt Olsberg
MF	(Sweden) Harry Jönsson
MF	(Sweden) Lars Granström
FW	(Sweden) Bo Larsson
FW	(Sweden) Christer Malmberg
Substitutes:
MF	(Sweden) Björn Friberg
FW	(Sweden) Conny Andersson
Manager:
(Spain) Antonio Durán
