= 2018 Svenska Cupen final =

- Event: 2017–18 Svenska Cupen
Djurgårdens IF	Malmö FF
3	0
- Date: 10 May 2018
- Venue: Tele2 Arena, Stockholm
- Referee: Bojan Pandžić
- Attendance: 25,123
- Weather: Clear; 17 °C (63 °F); 48% humidity

The 2018 Svenska Cupen final was played on 10 May 2018 between Djurgårdens IF and Malmö FF at Tele2 Arena, Stockholm, the home ground of Djurgårdens IF, determined in a draw on 21 March 2018 after the semi-finals. The final was the culmination of the 2017–18 Svenska Cupen, the 62nd season of Svenska Cupen and the sixth season with the current format.

Djurgården won their fifth Svenska Cupen title after defeating Malmö 3–0, earning themselves a place in the second qualifying round of the 2018–19 UEFA Europa League.

== Teams ==
Team	Previous finals appearances (bold indicates winners)
Djurgårdens IF	8 (1951, 1975, 1989, **1990**, **2002**, **2004**, **2005**, 2013)
Malmö FF	18 (**1944**, 1945, **1946**, **1947**, **1951**, **1953**, **1967**, 1971, **1973**, **1974**, **1975**, **1978**, **1980**, **1984**, **1986**, **1989**, 1996, 2016)

== Venue ==
Since the 2014–15 season, the venue for the Svenska Cupen final is decided in a draw between the two finalists. The draw for the final was held on 21 March 2018 at the annual pre-season kick-off meeting in Stockholm and decided that the final would be played at Tele2 Arena in Stockholm, the home venue of Djurgårdens IF. This was the first cup final to be hosted at the venue and the second consecutive final to be played on artificial turf.

== Background ==
The Allsvenskan clubs Djurgårdens IF and Malmö FF contested the final, with the winner earning a place in the second qualifying round of the 2018–19 UEFA Europa League. Since Malmö were qualified for the first qualifying round of the 2018–19 UEFA Champions League and Djurgården were qualified for the first qualifying round of the 2018–19 UEFA Europa League through their positions in the 2017 Allsvenskan, Sweden's fourth European place was given to BK Häcken as the 4th team of the 2017 Allsvenskan. Djurgården was given a place in the second qualifying round of the 2018–19 UEFA Europa League since they won the final.

Djurgården played their first final since 2013 and their ninth in total. Malmö played their first final since 2016 and their 19th in total. Both clubs lost in their previous final appearances. Having met in 1951, 1975, and 1989, this was the fourth final to contest the two clubs. Malmö had won all of the prior meetings in the final of the competition. The 1989 final was notably the last time Malmö won the competition, Djurgården had last won a cup title in 2005. The clubs faced each other twice in Allsvenskan prior to the cup final, at Tele2 Arena on 18 April where Djurgården won 3–0, and at Stadion on 3 May where Malmö won 1–0.

== Route to the final ==
Note: In all results below, the score of the finalist is given first (H: home; A: away).

Djurgårdens IF		Round	Malmö FF	
Opponent	Result	Initial rounds	Opponent	Result
Gamla Upsala SK	4–1 (A)	Second round	FC Trollhättan	4–1 (A)
Opponent	Result	Group stage	Opponent	Result
Degerfors IF	6–0 (H)	Matchday 1	Dalkurd FF	1–0 (H)
IK Frej	1–0 (A)	Matchday 2	Gefle IF	3–0 (A)
Jönköpings Södra IF	1–0 (H)	Matchday 3	IF Brommapojkarna	3–1 (H)
**Group 3 winner**: Pos / Team / Pld / Pts; **1** / Djurgårdens IF / **3** / **9**; 2 / Degerfors IF / 3 / **4**; 3 / IK Frej Täby / 3 / **3**; 4 / Jönköpings Södra IF / 3 / **1**; Source: Swedish Football Association		Final standings	**Group 1 winner**: Pos / Team / Pld / Pts; **1** / Malmö FF / **3** / **9**; 2 / IF Brommapojkarna / 3 / **6**; 3 / Dalkurd FF / 3 / **1**; 4 / Gefle IF / 3 / **1**; Source: Swedish Football Association	
Opponent	Result	Knockout stage	Opponent	Result
BK Häcken	1–0 (H)	Quarter-finals	IFK Göteborg	1–0 (H)
AIK	2–0 (A)	Semi-finals	Östersunds FK	1–0 (A)

== Match ==
=== Details ===
10 May 2018
15:00

Djurgårdens IF	3–0	Malmö FF
Une Larsson 17'; Mrabti 47'; Ring 81'	Report

Tele2 Arena, Stockholm
Attendance: 25,123
Referee: Bojan Pandžić

**Djurgårdens IF**	**Malmö FF**

GK	1	(Sweden) Andreas Isaksson
RB	4	(Sweden) Jacob Une Larsson
CB	3	(Sweden) Marcus Danielsson
CB	13	(Sweden) Jonas Olsson (c)
LB	22	(Sweden) Felix Beijmo		(substituted off) 81'
RM	11	(Sweden) Jonathan Ring
CM	23	(Norway) Fredrik Ulvestad
CM	6	(Sweden) Jesper Karlström	(yellow card) 37'
LM	9	(Bosnia and Herzegovina) Haris Radetinac		(substituted off) 78'
FW	24	(Zimbabwe) Tino Kadewere	(yellow card) 90'
FW	10	(Sweden) Kerim Mrabti	(yellow card) 24'	(substituted off) 70'
Substitutes:
GK	30	(Sweden) Tommi Vaiho
DF	5	(Norway) Niklas Gunnarsson		(substituted in) 81'
MF	7	(Sweden) Dženis Kozica		(substituted in) 70'
MF	8	(Sweden) Kevin Walker		(substituted in) 78'
MF	18	(Zambia) Edward Chilufya
FW	19	(Armenia) Yura Movsisyan
FW	20	(Senegal) Aliou Badji
Manager:
(Sweden) Özcan Melkemichel

GK	27	(Sweden) Johan Dahlin
RB	2	(Sweden) Eric Larsson	(yellow card) 78'	(substituted off) 79'
CB	24	(Denmark) Lasse Nielsen	(yellow card) 90'
CB	17	(Sweden) Rasmus Bengtsson
LB	4	(Sweden) Behrang Safari		(substituted off) 14'
RM	8	(Iceland) Arnór Ingvi Traustason	(yellow card) 37'
CM	6	(Sweden) Oscar Lewicki
CM	7	(Comoros) Fouad Bachirou
LM	5	(Denmark) Søren Rieks	(yellow card) 31'	(substituted off) 69'
FW	9	(Sweden) Markus Rosenberg (c)
FW	10	(Sweden) Carlos Strandberg
Substitutes:
GK	29	(Sweden) Fredrik Andersson
DF	3	(Sweden) Egzon Binaku		(substituted in) 14'
FW	11	(Sweden) Alexander Jeremejeff		(substituted in) 79'
MF	20	(Nigeria) Bonke Innocent
MF	22	(Sweden) Isak Ssewankambo
DF	31	(Sweden) Franz Brorsson
MF	32	(Sweden) Mattias Svanberg	(yellow card) 71'	(substituted in) 69'
Manager:
(Sweden) Magnus Pehrsson

Assistant referees:
Daniel Wärnmark
Stefan Hallberg
Fourth official:
Glenn Nyberg

**Match rules**

- 90 minutes.
- 30 minutes of extra time if necessary.
- Penalty shoot-out if scores still level.
- Seven named substitutes, of which up to three may be used.
