= 1973 Svenska Cupen final =

- Event: 1972–73 Svenska Cupen
Malmö FF	Åtvidabergs FF
7	0
- Date: 31 May 1973
- Venue: Stadsparksvallen, Jönköping
- Referee: Bertil Lööw (Jönköping)
- Attendance: 6,016

The 1973 Svenska Cupen final took place on 31 May 1973 at Stadsparksvallen in Jönköping. The match was contested by Allsvenskan sides Malmö FF and Åtvidabergs FF. The two clubs had faced each other just two years earlier in the 1971 Final . Åtvidaberg played their fourth final in total, Malmö FF played their ninth final in total. Malmö FF won their seventh title with a 7–0 victory.

== Match details ==
31 May 1973

Malmö FF	7–0	Åtvidabergs FF
T.Andersson 38'; Tapper 43' (pen.), 57', 75'; Stjernqvist 50'; Olsberg 78'; C.Andersson 88'

Stadsparksvallen, Jönköping
Attendance: 6,016
Referee: Bertil Lööw (Jönköping)

Malmö FF	Åtvidaberg

MALMÖ FF:
GK	(Sweden) Freddie Forsland
DF	(Sweden) Roland Andersson	(substituted off) 83'
DF	(Sweden) Krister Kristensson
DF	(Sweden) Roy Andersson
DF	(Sweden) Harry Jönsson
MF	(Sweden) Staffan Tapper
MF	(Sweden) Curt Olsberg
MF	(Sweden) Bo Larsson	(substituted off) 83'
MF	(Sweden) Tommy Andersson
FW	(Sweden) Conny Andersson
FW	(Sweden) Sten Stjernqvist
Substitutes:
DF	(Sweden) Christer Jacobsson	(substituted in) 83'
MF	(Sweden) Anders Ljungberg	(substituted in) 83'
Manager:
(Sweden) Karl-Erik Hult

ÅTVIDABERGS FF:
GK	(Sweden) Ulf Blomberg
DF	(Sweden) Kenneth Råsberg
DF	(Sweden) Kent Karlsson	(substituted off) 54'
DF	(Sweden) Lars-Göran Andersson
DF	(Sweden) Jörgen Augustsson
MF	(Sweden) Conny Torstensson
MF	(Sweden) Ingvar Svensson	(substituted off) 70'
MF	(Sweden) Reine Almqvist
MF	(Sweden) Benno Magnusson
FW	(Sweden) Roland Sandberg
FW	(Sweden) Nils Nilsson
Substitutes:
DF	(Sweden) Lage Gustafsson	(substituted in) 54'
MF	(Sweden) Lars Andersson	(substituted in) 70'
Manager:
(Sweden) Otto Dombos
