= 1974 Svenska Cupen final =

- Event: 1973–74 Svenska Cupen
Malmö FF	Östers IF
2	0
- Date: 23 May 1974
- Venue: Örjans Vall, Halmstad
- Referee: Lars-Åke Björck (Partille)
- Attendance: 4,227

The 1974 Svenska Cupen final took place on 23 May 1974 at Örjans Vall in Halmstad. The match was contested by Allsvenskan sides Malmö FF and Östers IF. Öster played their first cup final ever, Malmö FF played their second consecutive final and their 10th final in total. Malmö FF won their 8th title with a 2–0 victory.

== Match details ==
23 May 1974

Malmö FF	2–0	Östers IF
Sjöberg 56'; Tapper 87'

Örjans Vall, Halmstad
Attendance: 4,227
Referee: Lars-Åke Björck (Partille)

Malmö FF	Öster

MALMÖ FF:
GK	(Sweden) Jan Möller
DF	(Sweden) Roland Andersson
DF	(Sweden) Krister Kristensson
DF	(Sweden) Roy Andersson
DF	(Sweden) Harry Jönsson
MF	(Sweden) Staffan Tapper
MF	(Sweden) Anders Ljungberg
MF	(Sweden) Bo Larsson
MF	(Sweden) Tommy Andersson
FW	(Sweden) Thomas Sjöberg
FW	(Sweden) Tommy Larsson
Substitutes:
MF	(Sweden) Claes Malmberg
MF	(Sweden) Christer Malmberg
Manager:
(England) Bob Houghton

ÖSTERS IF:
GK	(Sweden) Göran Hagberg
DF	(Sweden) Björn Andersson
DF	(Sweden) Mats Nordenberg
DF	(Sweden) Håkan Arvidsson
DF	(Sweden) Per-Olof Bild
MF	(Sweden) Anders Linderoth
MF	(Sweden) Tommy Svensson
MF	(Sweden) Torbjörn Isaxon
MF	(Sweden) Hans Hansson
FW	(Sweden) Inge Ejderstedt
FW	(Sweden) Jan Mattsson
Substitutes:
??	(Sweden) Johnny Klüft
??	(Sweden) Peter Svensson
Manager:
(Sweden) Bengt Gustavsson
