= 1967 Svenska Cupen final =

- Event: 1967 Svenska Cupen
Malmö FF	IFK Norrköping
2	0
- Date: 1 November 1967
- Venue: Idrottsparken, Norrköping
- Referee: Arne Ekström (Stockholm)
- Attendance: 11,707

The 1967 Svenska Cupen final took place on 1 November 1967 at Idrottsparken in Norrköping. It was the first final since 1953 and the second consecutive final between Allsvenskan sides Malmö FF and IFK Norrköping. IFK Norrköping played their fifth final in total and Malmö FF played their seventh final in total. Malmö FF won their third consecutive final and their sixth title with a 2–0 victory.

== Match details ==
1 November 1967

Malmö FF	2–0	IFK Norrköping
Svahn 51'; Jönsson 55'

Idrottsparken, Norrköping
Attendance: 11,707
Referee: Arne Ekström (Stockholm)

Malmö FF	IFK Norrköping

MALMÖ FF:
GK	(Sweden) Nils Hult
DF	(Sweden) Jörgen Ohlin
DF	(Sweden) Krister Kristensson
DF	(Sweden) Bertil Elmstedt
DF	(Sweden) Rolf Björklund
MF	(Sweden) Lars Granström
MF	(Sweden) Anders Svensson
MF	(Sweden) Anders Ljungberg
MF	(Sweden) Harry Jönsson	(substituted off) 85'
FW	(Sweden) Ingvar Svahn
FW	(Sweden) Christer Malmberg
Substitutes:
DF	(Sweden) Ulf Kleander	(substituted in) 85'
Manager:
(Spain) Antonio Durán

IFK NORRKÖPING:
GK	(Sweden) Jan Connman
DF	(Sweden) Bill Björklund
DF	(Sweden) Björn Nordqvist
DF	(Sweden) Bert-Ottar Blom
DF	(Sweden) Roland Pressfeldt
MF	(Sweden) Torbjörn Jonsson
MF	(Sweden) Jan Ohlsson
MF	(Sweden) Ulf Jansson
MF	(Sweden) Ulf Hultberg	(substituted off) 60'
FW	(Sweden) Christer Sjölund
FW	(Sweden) Lars Berglund
Substitutes:
MF	(Sweden) Bo la Fleur	(substituted in) 60'
Manager:
(Sweden) Gunnar Nordahl
