= Bo Larsson =

Swedish footballer (1944–2023)

Bosse Larsson
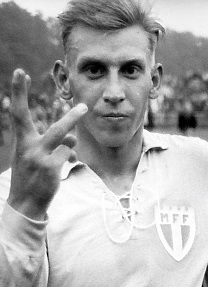
- Larsson in 1965

Personal information
- Full name: Bo-Göran Larsson
- Date of birth: 5 May 1944
- Place of birth: Malmö, Sweden
- Date of death: 18 December 2023 (aged 79)
- Place of death: Malmö, Sweden
- Height: 1.75 m (5 ft 9 in)
- Positions: Midfielder; striker

Senior career*
Years	Team	Apps	(Gls)
1962–1966	Malmö FF	86	(67)
1966–1969	VfB Stuttgart	88	(21)
1969–1979	Malmö FF	222	(52)
1980	Trelleborgs FF		

International career
1961–1962	Sweden U19	6	(0)
1963–1964	Sweden U21	3	(1)
1963–1965	Sweden B	3	(6)
1964–1978	Sweden	70	(17)

Managerial career
- 1981–1982: Kirseberg IF
- 1983–1984: Sofielund IF
- * Club domestic league appearances and goals

Bo-Göran "Bosse" Larsson (5 May 1944 – 18 December 2023) was a Swedish professional footballer who played as a midfielder and striker. Best remembered for his time with Malmö FF, he also represented VfB Stuttgart and Trelleborgs FF during his career. A full international between 1964 and 1978, he won 70 caps for the Sweden national team and scored 17 goals. He also represented Sweden at the 1970, 1974 and 1978 FIFA World Cups.

== Club career ==
Most of his club career he played for Malmö FF where he won the league championship several times. Between 1966 and 1969 he was an appreciated professional for VfB Stuttgart scoring 21 times in 88 games. As the best player in the team and loved by the supporters he was also awarded "Athlete of the Year" in 1969 by the city of Stuttgart. According to many he had a by far too short career as a professional player, but his wife Anita never settled to life in Germany, which made him move back home to Malmö that same summer.

Larsson was awarded the Guldbollen (the golden ball) in 1965 and 1973, and was the first to be awarded twice. In Malmö FF and among its supporters Bosse holds an iconic status and is regarded as the club's greatest player ever.

== International career ==
Bosse Larsson was one of the Sweden national team profiles during the 1970s. In total he got 70 caps, scoring 17 times, and played at the 1970 FIFA World Cup, 1974 FIFA World Cup and 1978 FIFA World Cup. The Sweden men's national team manager Georg "Åby" Ericson used to say that; "When picking a Swedish national squad you start by picking Bosse Larsson, then you start thinking about which other players to pick". Beside Nils Liedholm, Bosse Larsson is regarded as Sweden's most complete player ever, being able to actually play at almost any position on the pitch.

== Personal life ==
Larsson later lived in Malmö. In September 2007 a book titled "Bosse Larsson" was released. The book, written by Jonny Ambrius together with Bosse, and contains stories from his life, but with a focus on his footballer years. Shortly after the book release he also gave his permission for a possible statue to be made in his honour and placed outside Malmö FF's new stadium.

Larsson died on 18 December 2023, at the age of 79.

== Career statistics ==
=== International ===
Appearances and goals by national team and year
National team	Year	Apps	Goals
Sweden	1964	2	2
Sweden	1965	5	3
Sweden	1966	3	1
Sweden	1967	0	0
Sweden	1968	3	2
Sweden	1969	6	0
Sweden	1970	11	0
Sweden	1971	9	2
Sweden	1972	8	4
Sweden	1973	9	2
Sweden	1974	10	1
Sweden	1975	0	0
Sweden	1976	0	0
Sweden	1977	0	0
Sweden	1978	4	0
Total		70	17

Scores and results list Sweden's goal tally first, score column indicates score after each Larsson goal.

List of international goals scored by Bosse Larsson
No.	Date	Venue	Opponent	Score	Result	Competition	Ref.
1	20 September 1964	Ullevaal Stadion, Oslo, Norway	Norway	1–0	1–1	1964–67 Nordic Football Championship	
2	7 October 1964	Råsunda Stadium, Solna, Sweden	Poland	3–3	3–3	Friendly	
3	16 June 1965	Malmö Stadion, Malmö, Sweden	Italy	1–2	2–2	Friendly	
4	7 November 1965	Dr. Fazil Kucuk Stadium, Famagusta, Cyprus	Cyprus	4–0	5–0	1966 FIFA World Cup qualification	
5	7 November 1965	Dr. Fazil Kucuk Stadium, Famagusta, Cyprus	Cyprus	5–0	5–0	1966 FIFA World Cup qualification	
6	18 May 1966	Swierczewski, Wrocław, Poland	Poland	1–0	1–1	Friendly	
7	9 October 1968	Råsunda Stadium, Solna, Sweden	Norway	2–0	5–0	1970 FIFA World Cup qualification	
8	9 October 1968	Råsunda Stadium, Solna, Sweden	Norway	5–0	5–0	1970 FIFA World Cup qualification	
9	20 May 1971	Ryavallen, Örebro, Sweden	Finland	1–1	4–1	1968–71 Nordic Football Championship	
10	8 August 1971	Malmö Stadion, Malmö, Sweden	Norway	3–0	3–0	1968–71 Nordic Football Championship	
11	29 June 1972	Malmö Stadion, Malmö, Sweden	Denmark	1–0	2–0	1972–77 Nordic Football Championship	
12	17 September 1972	Ullevaal Stadion, Oslo, Norway	Norway	3–1	3–1	1972–77 Nordic Football Championship	
13	15 October 1972	Ullevi, Gothenburg, Sweden	Malta	2–0	7–0	1974 FIFA World Cup qualification	
14	15 October 1972	Ullevi, Gothenburg, Sweden	Malta	3–0	7–0	1974 FIFA World Cup qualification	
15	11 November 1973	Gzira Stadium, Gżira, Malta	Malta	2–1	2–1	1974 FIFA World Cup qualification	
16	27 November 1973	Parkstadion, Gelsenkirchen, West Germany	Austria	2–0	2–1	1974 FIFA World Cup qualification	
17	4 September 1974	Råsunda Stadium, Solna, Sweden	Netherlands	1–1	1–5	Friendly	

== Honours ==
Malmö FF

- Allsvenskan: 1965, 1970, 1971, 1974, 1975, 1977
- Svenska Cupen: 1973, 1974, 1975, 1978

Trelleborgs FF

- Division 3 Skåne: 1980

Individual

- Allsvenskan top scorer: 1963 (17 goals), 1965 (28 goals), 1970 (16 goals)
- Guldbollen (Swedish Footballer of the Year): 1965, 1973 (the first to be awarded twice)
- Stor Grabb: 1968
- Best footballer of the Bundesliga: 1968–69
- Athlete of the Year by the city of Stuttgart: 1969
- 2005 Swedish Football Association Hall of Fame inductee
- Honorary member of Malmö FF

Records

- Most goal scorer of Malmö FF: 119 goals (307 games)

Sporting positions
Preceded by Krister Kristensson	Malmö FF; Captain; 1979	Succeeded by Roland Andersson
