= Thomas Sjöberg =

Swedish footballer and manager

Personal information
- Date of birth: 6 July 1952 (age 74)
- Place of birth: Helsingborg, Sweden
- Position: Striker

Youth career
- 1964–1974: Eskilsminne IF

Senior career*
Years	Team	Apps	(Gls)
1974–1976	Malmö FF	75	(40)
1976–1977	Karlsruher SC	6	(0)
1977–1978	Malmö FF	34	(13)
1978	Al-Ittihad		
1979	Chicago Sting	17	(13)
1979–1982	Malmö FF	71	(27)
1983–1985	Helsingborgs IF	58	(20)
1985–1986	Lunds BK		

International career
1974	Sweden U21	2	(2)
1974–1981	Sweden	45	(14)

Managerial career
- 1991: GIF Nike P85
- 1997–1998: BSC Young Boys
- * Club domestic league appearances and goals

Thomas Sjöberg (born 6 July 1952) is a Swedish former professional footballer who played as a forward. A full international between 1974 and 1981, he won 45 caps for the Sweden national team and represented his country at the 1978 FIFA World Cup.

== Club career ==
Sjöberg played much of his career with Malmö FF in Allsvenskan during the 1970s. Already during his first season for Malmö FF, the club, much to his goal scoring capacity won the top Swedish football league, Allsvenskan in 1974, under English manager Bob Houghton. This was repeated the following season. When he then left for Karlsruher SC in the Bundesliga during the 1976–77 season, his former Swedish club only came second in Allsvenskan, behind Halmstad BK, which were led by another Englishman, Roy Hodgson. As Sjöberg returned to Malmö FF they won Allsvenskan again! So during four years, Malmö FF won Allsvenskan at three occasions, in which Sjöberg participated during the three "golden years" only. With Malmö FF he won Allsvenskan and became Swedish Champion in 1974, 1975 and 1977.

After scoring a goal for Sweden in the 1978 World Cup in Argentina against Brazil, the well bearded Sjöberg become interesting for an Arabian Sheik, who bought him for a club in Saudi Arabia. This became a rather short adventure for him, and likewise a shorter time in the old North American NASL league (not to be confused with current Major League Soccer) and a club from Chicago followed. This time he was absent from Malmö FF for less than 12 months. However he missed an indeed very important season for Malmö FF, and didn't participate in the club's most well known international achievement so far (also by summer of 2014), to reach the final of the European Cup in 1978–79 season. (which though was lost to Nottingham Forest by a single decider). He did though return to Malmö FF for a third time and for some more seasons. He ended his career at Lunds BK.

== International career ==
Sjöberg was capped 45 times for the Sweden national team and scored a goal against Brazil in the 1978 FIFA World Cup.

== Coaching career ==
He coached BSC Young Boys with Roland Andersson.

== Career statistics ==
=== International ===
Appearances and goals by national team and year
National team	Year	Apps	Goals
Sweden	1974	1	0
Sweden	1975	7	4
Sweden	1976	8	5
Sweden	1977	10	2
Sweden	1978	8	1
Sweden	1979	0	0
Sweden	1980	7	1
Sweden	1981	4	1
Total		45	14

Scores and results list Sweden's goal tally first, score column indicates score after each Sjöberg goal.

List of international goals scored by Thomas Sjöberg
No.	Date	Venue	Opponent	Score	Result	Competition	Ref.
1	16 April 1975	Ullevi, Gothenburg, Sweden	Scotland	1–0	1–1	Friendly	
2	19 May 1975	Örjans Vall, Halmstad, Sweden	Algeria	4–0	4–0	Friendly	
3	13 August 1975	Ullevaal Stadium, Oslo, Norway	Norway	2–0	2–0	UEFA Euro 1976 qualifying	
4	3 September 1975	Windsor Park, Belfast, Northern Ireland	Northern Ireland	2–1	2–2	UEFA Euro 1976 qualifying	
5	16 June 1976	Råsunda Stadium, Solna, Sweden	Norway	2–0	2–0	1978 FIFA World Cup qualifying	
6	11 August 1976	Malmö Stadium, Malmö, Sweden	Finland	1–0	6–0	1972–77 Nordic Football Championship	
7	11 August 1976	Malmö Stadium, Malmö, Sweden	Finland	3–0	6–0	1972–77 Nordic Football Championship	
8	22 September 1976	Ullevaal Stadium, Oslo, Norway	Norway	2–2	2–3	1972–77 Nordic Football Championship	
9	9 September 1976	St. Jakob-Park, Basel, Switzerland	Switzerland	1–2	1–2	1978 FIFA World Cup qualifying	
10	8 June 1977	Råsunda Stadium, Solna, Sweden	Switzerland	1–0	2–1	1978 FIFA World Cup qualifying	
11	7 September 1977	Ullevaal Stadium, Oslo, Norway	Norway	1–1	1–2	1978 FIFA World Cup qualifying	
12	3 June 1978	Estadio José María Minella, Mar del Plata, Argentina	Brazil	1–0	1–1	1978 FIFA World Cup	
13	22 May 1980	Helsinki Olympic Stadium, Helsinki, Finland	Finland	2–0	2–0	1978–80 Nordic Football Championship	
14	12 August 1981	Rimnersvallen, Uddevalla, Sweden	Bulgaria	1–0	1–0	Friendly	

== Honours ==
Malmö FF

- Swedish Champion: 1974, 1975, 1977
- Svenska Cupen: 1973–74, 1974–75, 1977–78, 1979–80

Individual

- Stor Grabb: 1976
