= Kjell Karlsson =

Kjell Karlsson may refer to:

- Kjell Karlsson (Malmö FF footballer), Swedish footballer who played for Malmö FF 1939–1940
- Kjell Karlsson (footballer born 1953) (born 1953), Swedish footballer
