= Bengt Persson =

Bengt Persson may refer to:

- Bengt Persson (athlete)
- Bengt Persson (football manager)

== See also ==
- Bent Persson, Swedish jazz trumpeter and cornetist
