= Brynäs IF Fotboll =

Brynäs IF
- Full name: Brynäs Idrottsförening
- Founded: 12 May 1912; 113 years ago
- Ground: Måsbergets IP, Gävle
- Chairman: Lars-Göran Karlsson
- League: Division 4 Gästrikland
- 2019: Division 4 Gästrikland, 3rd
Home colours

Brynäs IF is a Swedish football club located in Gävle.

== Background ==
Formed in 1912, Brynäs Idrottsförening has played only one season in the highest Swedish division, Allsvenskan (1974). The club won the Swedish Championship in 1925. Brynäs IF merged with Gefle IF and played under the name Gefle IF/Brynäs between the 1979 and 1981 seasons, but the merger was split up in 1982. Brynäs IF FK are affiliated to the Gestriklands Fotbollförbund.

== Achievements ==
- Swedish Champions^{[A]}
  - Winners (1): 1925

=== Cups ===
- Svenska Mästerskapet:
  - Winners: 1925

== Season to season ==
In their early years Brynäs IF competed in the following divisions:

Season	Level	Division	Section	Position	Movements
1928–29	Tier 3	Division 3	Uppsvenska	5th	
1929–30	Tier 3	Division 3	Uppsvenska	4th	
1930–31	Tier 3	Division 3	Uppsvenska	4th	
1931–32	Tier 3	Division 3	Uppsvenska	2nd	Promoted
1932–33	Tier 2	Division 2	Norra	7th	
1933–34	Tier 2	Division 2	Norra	10th	Relegated
1934–35	Tier 3	Division 3	Uppsvenska Östra	4th	
1935–36	Tier 3	Division 3	Uppsvenska Västra	2nd	
1936–37	Tier 3	Division 3	Uppsvenska Västra	4th	
1937–38	Tier 3	Division 3	Uppsvenska Västra	4th	
1938–39	Tier 3	Division 3	Uppsvenska Västra	3rd	

In the 1960s and 1970s Brynäs IF had their most successful period and competed in the following divisions:

Season	Level	Division	Section	Position	Movements
1960	Tier 4	Division 4	Gästrikland	3rd	
1961	Tier 4	Division 4	Gästrikland	2nd	
1962	Tier 4	Division 4	Gästrikland	1st	Promoted
1963	Tier 3	Division 3	Södra Norrland	7th	
1964	Tier 3	Division 3	Södra Norrland	1st	Promoted
1965	Tier 2	Division 2	Norrland	7th	
1966	Tier 2	Division 2	Norrland	4th	
1967	Tier 2	Division 2	Norrland	3rd	
1968	Tier 2	Division 2	Svealand	6th	
1969	Tier 2	Division 2	Norrland	3rd	
1970	Tier 2	Division 2	Norrland	5th	
1971	Tier 2	Division 2	Norrland	4th	
1972	Tier 2	Division 2	Norra	5th	
1973	Tier 2	Division 2	Norra	1st	Promoted
1974	Tier 1	Allsvenskan		14th	Relegated
1975	Tier 2	Division 2	Norra	2nd	
1976	Tier 2	Division 2	Norra	7th	
1977	Tier 2	Division 2	Norra	9th	
1978	Tier 2	Division 2	Norra	14th	Relegated
1979	Tier 3	Division 3	Södra Norrland	1st	Promotion Playoffs

In recent seasons Brynäs IF have competed in the following divisions:

Season	Level	Division	Section	Position	Movements
1993	Tier 4	Division 3	Södra Norrland	11th	Relegated
1994	Tier 5	Division 4	Gästrikland	4th	
1995	Tier 5	Division 4	Gästrikland	2nd	Promotion Playoffs
1996	Tier 5	Division 4	Gästrikland	2nd	Promotion Playoffs
1997	Tier 5	Division 4	Gästrikland	2nd	Promotion Playoffs
1998	Tier 5	Division 4	Gästrikland	4th	
1999	Tier 5	Division 4	Gästrikland	6th	
2000	Tier 5	Division 4	Gästrikland	5th	
2001	Tier 5	Division 4	Gästrikland	1st	Promoted
2002	Tier 4	Division 3	Södra Norrland	5th	
2003	Tier 4	Division 3	Södra Norrland	4th	
2004	Tier 4	Division 3	Norra Svealand	4th	
2005	Tier 4	Division 3	Södra Norrland	2nd	Promoted
2006*	Tier 4	Division 2	Norra Svealand	9th	
2007	Tier 4	Division 2	Norra Svealand	10th	Relegation Playoffs
2008	Tier 4	Division 2	Norra Svealand	11th	Relegated
2009	Tier 5	Division 3	Södra Norrland	9th	
2010	Tier 5	Division 3	Södra Norrland	9th	Relegation Playoffs
2011	Tier 5	Division 3	Södra Norrland	12th	Relegated
2012	Tier 6	Division 4	Gästrikland	9th	
2013	Tier 6	Division 4	Gästrikland	2nd	Promoted
2014	Tier 5	Division 3	Södra Norrland	10th	Relegated
2015	Tier 6	Division 4	Gästrikland	3rd	
2016	Tier 6	Division 4	Gästrikland	5th	
2017	Tier 6	Division 4	Gästrikland	4th	
2018	Tier 6	Division 4	Gästrikland	2nd	Promotion Playoffs – Not promoted
2019	Tier 6	Division 4	Gästrikland	3rd	
2020	Tier 6	Division 4	Gästrikland	7th	
2021	Tier 6	Division 4	Gästrikland		

* League restructuring in 2006 resulted in a new division being created at Tier 3 and subsequent divisions dropping a level.

== Attendances ==
In recent seasons IK Tord have had the following average attendances:

Season	Average attendance	Division / Section	Level
2009	132	Div 3 Södra Norrland	Tier
2010	119	Div 3 Södra Norrland	Tier 5
2011	112	Div 3 Södra Norrland	Tier 5
2012	50	Div 4 Gästrikland	Tier 6
2013	57	Div 4 Gästrikland	Tier 6
2014	79	Div 3 Södra Norrland	Tier 5
2015	49	Div 4 Gästrikland	Tier 6
2016	51	Div 4 Gästrikland	Tier 6
2017	58	Div 4 Gästrikland	Tier 6
2018	Not Available	Div 4 Gästrikland	Tier 6
2019	?	Div 4 Gästrikland	Tier 6
2020		Div 4 Gästrikland	Tier 6

* Attendances are provided in the Publikliga sections of the Svenska Fotbollförbundet website.

== Footnotes ==
A. The title of "Swedish Champions" has been awarded to the winner of four different competitions over the years. Between 1896 and 1925 the title was awarded to the winner of Svenska Mästerskapet, a stand-alone cup tournament. No club were given the title between 1926 and 1930 even though the first-tier league Allsvenskan was played. In 1931 the title was reinstated and awarded to the winner of Allsvenskan. Between 1982 and 1990 a play-off in cup format was held at the end of the league season to decide the champions. After the play-off format in 1991 and 1992 the title was decided by the winner of Mästerskapsserien, an additional league after the end of Allsvenskan. Since the 1993 season the title has once again been awarded to the winner of Allsvenskan.
