= Daniel Andersson (footballer, born 1977) =

Swedish footballer

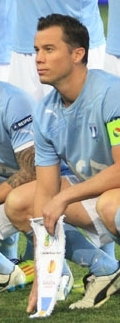
- Andersson with Malmö in 2011

Personal information
- Full name: Daniel Jerry Andersson
- Date of birth: 28 August 1977 (age 49)
- Place of birth: Lund, Sweden
- Height: 1.78 m (5 ft 10 in)
- Positions: Defender; midfielder

Team information
- Current team: Malmö (sporting director)

Youth career
- –1994: Bjärreds
- 1994–1995: Malmö

Senior career*
Years	Team	Apps	(Gls)
1995–1998	Malmö	85	(11)
1998–2001	Bari	97	(16)
2001–2002	Venezia	29	(0)
2002–2003	→ Chievo (loan)	12	(0)
2003–2004	→ Ancona (loan)	25	(1)
2004–2013	Malmö	207	(19)
Total		455	(47)

International career
1993–1994	Sweden U17	16	(6)
1995	Sweden U19	4	(1)
1996–1998	Sweden U21	16	(2)
1997–2009	Sweden	74	(0)

Managerial career
- 2018: Malmö (caretaker)
- * Club domestic league appearances and goals

Daniel Jerry Andersson (Swedish pronunciation: [ˈdɑ̂ːnɪɛl ˈânːdɛˌʂɔn]; born 28 August 1977) is a Swedish football executive and former manager and player who played primarily as a defensive midfielder but could also play as a centre back. He is currently the sporting director of Allsvenskan club Malmö.

Andersson played the majority of his career for Malmö in two different periods where he also served as team captain between 2006 and 2011. He also had a successful period playing for Serie A club Bari. Andersson also had a long international playing career, playing 74 matches for Sweden. He is part of a prosperous football family as both his father Roy and brother Patrik had successful football careers.

== Club career ==
=== Early career ===
Andersson played for Bjärreds as a youngster, but joined Malmö in 1994. He gradually became a star in the Swedish league, and was bought by Italian Serie A outfit Bari.

=== Bari ===
Andersson enjoyed big personal success at Bari, being named captain as a foreigner at only 23 years, in his third year. This attracted the interest of Juventus and Fiorentina amongst other clubs, with both clubs putting bids on the table. Andersson was also on his way to Fiorentina, but due to their financial problems the transfer was cancelled in the last minute.

=== Venezia and loans to Chievo and Ancona ===
Instead he transferred to Venezia for a fee of 6 million euro, where he had an average season. After that he had short loan stints with Chievo and Ancona. In 2004, he returned to Malmö together with former teammate Yksel Osmanovski.

=== Return to Malmö ===
Daniel Andersson returned to Malmö the same year as his brother, Patrik Andersson, who was captain of the team at the time. The return of both Andersson brothers was a contributing factor to the club winning the league the same year. When Patrik retired due to injury problems in 2005, Daniel took over the captaincy and held it until his retirement.

After having played as centre midfielder for the majority of his career, he took the position as centre back from the start of the 2010 season, where he enjoyed great success, consistently being one of the best players in Malmö that year. With this change, he became the third Andersson family member after his father Roy and brother Patrik to captain Malmö from the centre back position. He succeeded so well with the position change that he was nominated for Swedish Defender of the Year and Allsvenskan Player of the Year after he led Malmö to their 16th Swedish Championship.

On 29 October 2011, Andersson announced that he would focus on his forthcoming coaching career as one of the three assistant managers for Malmö, but emphasized that he would continue to play for the club when he was needed. On 15 December 2011, he played his last match for Malmö as player only in the away match against Austria Wien in the final fixture of the group stage of the 2011–12 UEFA Europa League. Due to injury problems with the clubs younger defenders, Andersson played 16 of 30 matches in the 2012 season, most of these matches were played before the summer break. His last match as a professional player was an away fixture against Elfsborg on 12 August 2012. On 16 November, Andersson announced the end of his professional playing career to be able to fully focus on his coaching duties.

== International career ==
=== Youth ===
Andersson represented the Sweden U17, U19, and U21 teams between 1993 and 1998 and was part of the Sweden squad that reached the quarter-finals at the 1998 UEFA European Under-21 Championship.

=== Senior ===
Andersson was capped 74 times for Sweden between 1997 and 2009. He was a squad member for Euro 2000, Euro 2008, and the 2002 and 2006 World Cup finals. At Euro 2000, he was a regular starter in Sweden's line-up. As a result of Tobias Linderoth getting injured, he was once again a regular starter at Euro 2008, although the team did not make it into the knockout stages of the competition. Andersson retired from the national team after the unsuccessful campaign to qualify for the 2010 World Cup, in order to devote his energies to Malmö FF.

== Coaching career ==
Andersson was appointed as one of three new assistant managers at Malmö, along with Jörgen Pettersson and Simon Hollyhead, on 29 October 2011. His focus was primarily on the defensive side of training at first and helping former manager Rikard Norling pick the starting eleven.

On 14 May 2018, Andersson took over as the caretaker manager at Malmö, following the sacking of Magnus Pehrsson; the club was in tenth place in the league after nine rounds.

== Executive career ==
On 9 January 2014, Andersson assumed the role of sporting director at Malmö, taking over the position from Per Ågren, who stepped down.

== Personal life ==
Daniel Andersson is the son of Roy Andersson and the younger brother of Patrik Andersson, all three of them being some of the most successful players in Malmö. A notable fact is also that all three have played at centre back and have been team captain of Malmö.

== Career statistics ==
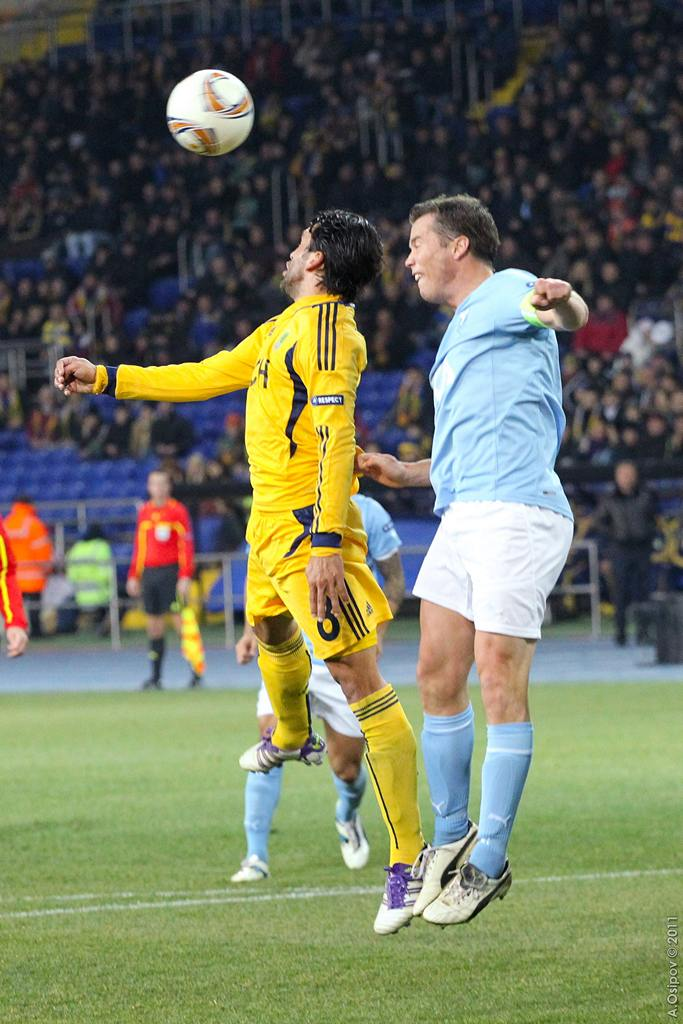
Andersson playing for Malmö FF in the UEFA Europa League

=== Club ===
Appearances and goals by club, season and competition
Club	Season	League			Cup		Continental		Total	
Club	Season	Division	Apps	Goals	Apps	Goals	Apps	Goals	Apps	Goals
Malmö	1995	Allsvenskan	21	2	—		—		21	2
Malmö	1996	Allsvenskan	26	2	—		—		26	2
Malmö	1997	Allsvenskan	26	4	—		—		26	4
Malmö	1998	Allsvenskan	12	3	—		—		12	3
Malmö	Total		85	11	0	0	0	0	85	11
Bari	1998–99	Serie A	33	3	—		—		33	3
Bari	1999–2000	Serie A	32	5	—		—		32	5
Bari	2000–01	Serie A	32	8	—		—		32	8
Bari	Total		97	16	0	0	0	0	97	16
Venezia	2001–02	Serie A	29	0	—		—		29	0
Chievo	2002–03	Serie A	12	0	—		—		12	0
Ancona	2003–04	Serie A	25	1	—		—		25	1
Malmö	2004	Allsvenskan	11	0	0	0	0	0	11	0
Malmö	2005	Allsvenskan	25	2	3	1	5	1	33	4
Malmö	2006	Allsvenskan	25	3	1	0	—		26	3
Malmö	2007	Allsvenskan	23	4	2	0	—		25	4
Malmö	2008	Allsvenskan	24	3	3	0	—		27	3
Malmö	2009	Allsvenskan	26	1	1	0	—		27	1
Malmö	2010	Allsvenskan	30	5	2	0	—		32	5
Malmö	2011	Allsvenskan	25	0	3	1	11	0	38	1
Malmö	2012	Allsvenskan	16	1	1	0	—		17	1
Malmö	2013	Allsvenskan	2	0	0	0	0	0	2	0
Malmö	Total		207	19	16	2	16	1	239	22
Career total			455	47	16	2	16	1	487	50

=== International ===
Appearances and goals by national team and year
National team	Year	Apps	Goals
Sweden	1997	3	0
Sweden	1998	5	0
Sweden	1999	8	0
Sweden	2000	8	0
Sweden	2001	10	0
Sweden	2002	4	0
Sweden	2003	0	0
Sweden	2004	0	0
Sweden	2005	7	0
Sweden	2006	7	0
Sweden	2007	6	0
Sweden	2008	12	0
Sweden	2009	4	0
Total		74	0

== Honours ==
Malmö

- Allsvenskan: 2004, 2010

Individual

- Swedish Midfielder of the Year: 1997
- Swedish Goal of the Year: 1997
