= Patrik Andersson =

Swedish footballer

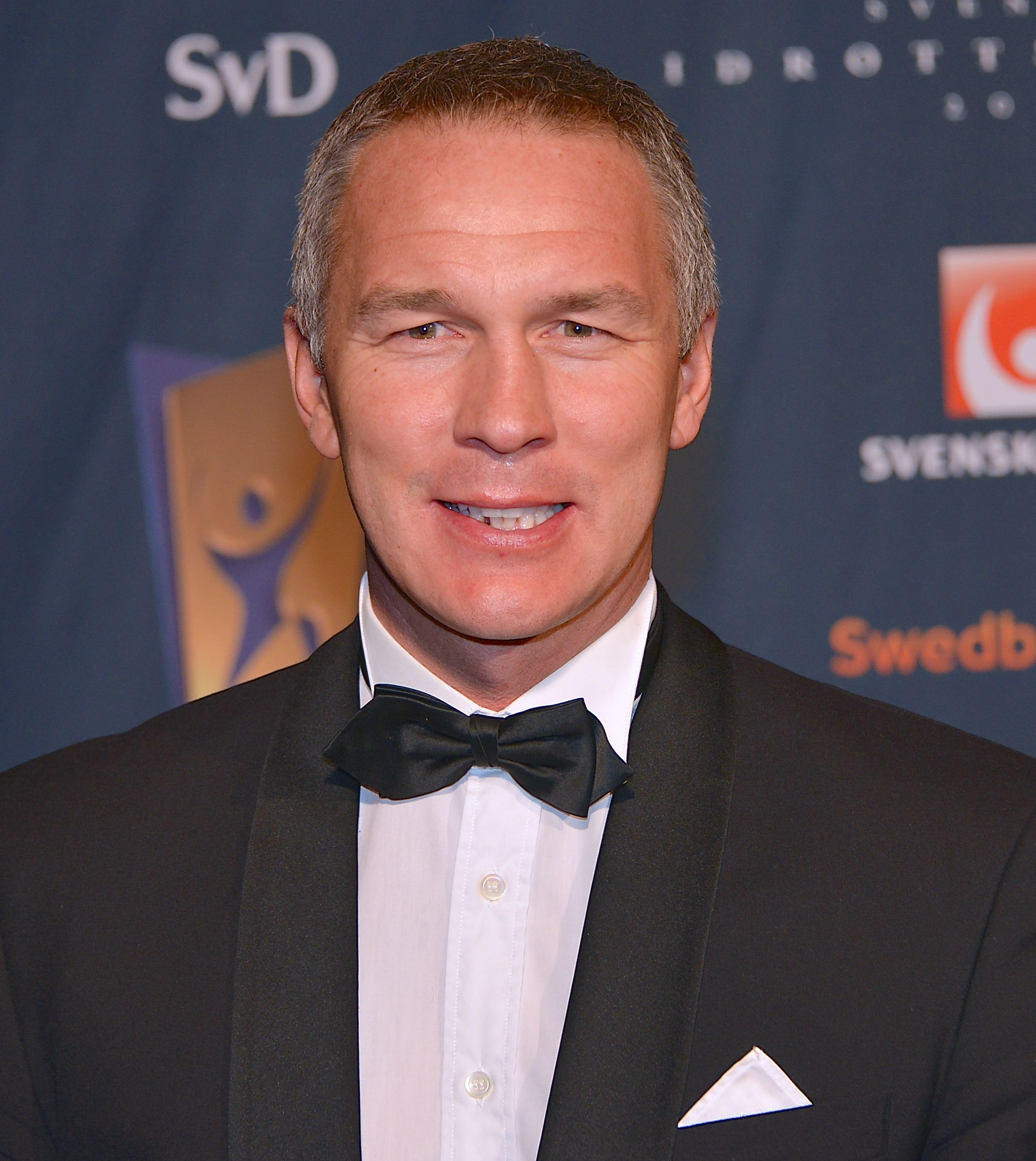
- Andersson at the Swedish Sports Awards in 2013

Personal information
- Full name: Patrik Jonas Andersson
- Date of birth: 18 August 1971 (age 55)
- Place of birth: Bjärred, Sweden
- Height: 1.85 m (6 ft 1 in)
- Position: Defender

Youth career
- –1988: Bjärreds IF
- 1988–1989: Malmö FF

Senior career*
Years	Team	Apps	(Gls)
1989–1992	Malmö FF	90	(11)
1992–1993	Blackburn Rovers	12	(0)
1993–1999	Borussia Mönchengladbach	174	(10)
1999–2001	Bayern Munich	35	(1)
2001–2004	Barcelona	19	(0)
2004–2005	Malmö FF	19	(1)
Total		349	(23)

International career
1992	Sweden Olympic		
1992–2002	Sweden	96	(3)
Medal record
Sweden
FIFA World Cup
Bronze medal – third place	1994
- * Club domestic league appearances and goals

Patrik Jonas Andersson (pronounced [ˈpɑ̌ːtrɪk ˈânːdɛˌʂɔn]; born 18 August 1971) is a Swedish former professional footballer who played as a defender.

Starting off his career with Malmö FF in the late 1980s, he went on to play professionally in England, Germany, and Spain, and won the 2000–01 UEFA Champions League with Bayern Munich. He returned to Malmö in 2004, before retiring the following season.

A full international between 1992 and 2002, he won 96 caps for the Sweden national team and was a part of the Sweden team that finished third at the 1994 FIFA World Cup. He also played at the 1992 Summer Olympics, UEFA Euro 1992, UEFA Euro 2000, and was a squad player at the 2002 FIFA World Cup.

He was awarded Guldbollen as the Sweden's best footballer of the year in 1995 and 2001.

== Club career ==
=== Early career ===
Born in Bjärred, Andersson began his career with the local club, Bjärreds IF. In 1988, he moved on to Allsvenskan club Malmö FF.

=== Blackburn Rovers ===
In December 1992, Andersson went professional as he moved to Blackburn Rovers for a fee of £800,000, where he stayed for one year, making just 12 Premier League appearances. However, he is notable for being one of the first foreign signings by Blackburn Rovers, and one of the relatively small group of foreigners who appeared in the first season of the new Premier League in England. He scored once for Blackburn, in a 2–1 defeat to Sheffield Wednesday in the second leg of the 1992–93 Football League Cup semi-final.

=== Borussia Mönchengladbach ===
His next step was to go to Germany in October 1993 and play for Borussia Mönchengladbach. There, he won the DFB-Pokal with the team in 1995, but left the team, as its performance deteriorated, in 1999.

=== Bayern Munich ===
In June 1999, Andersson signed for Bayern Munich for approximately DM 6 million. He made his debut on 22 August 1999 in a 2–0 away defeat to Bayer Leverkusen. His time with Bayern resulted in two Bundesliga championships (in the 2000–01 championship season he scored the final and decisive goal against Hamburger SV in the last minute – his only goal for the club) as well as a DFB-Pokal and victory in the 2000–01 UEFA Champions League, despite missing his penalty in the final shootout.

=== Barcelona ===
Andersson moved to La Liga giants Barcelona in 2001 and spent three injury-plagued seasons there. Therefore, he played only 19 league matches for the Blaugrana.

=== Return to Malmö ===
For the 2004 season, Andersson came back to Malmö to play in the Swedish league again after ten years. That year, he captained Malmö, who won their first Swedish league (Allsvenskan) title in 15 years. He has twice been awarded Guldbollen as the Swedish footballer of the year, in 1995 and 2001. After suffering yet another knee injury during a Champions League qualifier against Swiss team Thun on 10 August 2005, Andersson announced his retirement from professional football on 12 August 2005.

== International career ==
Andersson earned a total of 96 caps for the Sweden national team, scoring three goals. He won a bronze medal in the 1994 FIFA World Cup. Andersson also played in the team that reached the semi-finals at UEFA Euro 1992. He was on the Sweden national squad in Euro 2000, the 2002 FIFA World Cup and was a member of the Sweden squad at the 1992 Summer Olympics in Barcelona. At Euro 2000, he received a red card for a hard foul on Belgium's Bart Goor. At the 2002 World Cup, in Sweden's last training session before their opening match against England, Andersson was injured and was not able to play in the tournament. He was replaced by Andreas Jakobsson.

== Post-playing career ==
He was appointed as Manchester United's scout in Scandinavia in August 2010. He left the club after one year.

== Personal life ==
Andersson is the son of Roy Andersson, who played more than 300 games for Malmö and won 20 caps for the Sweden national team, representing them at the 1978 FIFA World Cup. His brother is Daniel Andersson, also a former professional footballer and Sweden international.

== Career statistics ==
=== Club ===
Appearances and goals by club, season and competition
Club	Season	League			Cup		League Cup		Continental		Total	
Club	Season	Division	Apps	Goals	Apps	Goals	Apps	Goals	Apps	Goals	Apps	Goals
Malmö FF	1989	Allsvenskan	15	1			–		4	0	19	1
Malmö FF	1990	Allsvenskan	20	2			–		4	0	24	2
Malmö FF	1991	Allsvenskan	28	1			–		–		28	1
Malmö FF	1992	Allsvenskan	27	7			–		–		27	7
Malmö FF	Total		90	11			–		8	0	98	11
Blackburn Rovers	1992–93	Premier League	11	0					–		11	0
Blackburn Rovers	1993–94	Premier League	1	0					–		1	0
Blackburn Rovers	Total		12	0					–		12	0
Borussia; Mönchengladbach	1993–94	Bundesliga	17	1	0	0	–		–		17	1
Borussia; Mönchengladbach	1994–95	Bundesliga	34	1	6	0	1	0	–		41	1
Borussia; Mönchengladbach	1995–96	Bundesliga	33	4	2	0	–		6	0	41	4
Borussia; Mönchengladbach	1996–97	Bundesliga	32	1	2	0	–		4	1	38	2
Borussia; Mönchengladbach	1997–98	Bundesliga	30	3	1	0	–		–		31	3
Borussia; Mönchengladbach	1998–99	Bundesliga	28	0	3	0	–		–		31	0
Borussia; Mönchengladbach	Total		174	10	14	0	1	0	10	1	199	11
Bayern Munich	1999–2000	Bundesliga	15	0	5	0	2	0	9	0	31	0
Bayern Munich	2000–01	Bundesliga	20	1	1	0	2	0	12	0	35	1
Bayern Munich	Total		35	1	6	0	4	0	21	0	66	1
Barcelona	2001–02	La Liga	12	0	1	0	–		6	1	19	1
Barcelona	2002–03	La Liga	3	0	0	0	–		4	0	7	0
Barcelona	2003–04	La Liga	4	0	1	0	–		0	0	5	0
Barcelona	Total		19	0	2	0	–		10	1	31	1
Malmö FF	2004	Allsvenskan	10	1			–		–		10	1
Malmö FF	2005	Allsvenskan	9	0			–		3	0	12	0
Malmö FF	Total		19	1			–		11	0	22	1
Career total			349	23	22	0	5	0	53	2	428	25

=== International ===
Appearances and goals by national team and year
National team	Year	Apps	Goals
Sweden	1992	11	0
Sweden	1993	7	0
Sweden	1994	15	1
Sweden	1995	7	0
Sweden	1996	8	1
Sweden	1997	9	0
Sweden	1998	7	0
Sweden	1999	9	0
Sweden	2000	10	0
Sweden	2001	10	1
Sweden	2002	3	0
Total		96	3

Scores and results list Sweden's goal tally first, score column indicates score after each Andersson goal.

List of international goals scored by Patrik Andersson
No.	Date	Venue	Opponent	Score	Result	Competition
1	17 August 1994	Eyravallen, Örebro, Sweden	Lithuania	3–0	4–2	Friendly
2	1 June 1996	Råsunda Stadium, Solna, Sweden	Belarus	4–1	5–1	1998 FIFA World Cup qualification
3	1 September 2001	Gradski Stadion, Skopje, North Macedonia	North Macedonia	2–0	2–1	2002 FIFA World Cup qualification

== Honours ==
Borussia Mönchengladbach

- DFB-Pokal: 1994–95

Bayern Munich

- Bundesliga: 1999–2000, 2000–01
- DFB-Pokal: 1999–2000
- DFB-Ligapokal: 1999, 2000
- UEFA Champions League: 2000–01

Malmö FF

- Allsvenskan: 2004

Sweden

- FIFA World Cup third place: 1994

Individual

- kicker Bundesliga Team of the Season: 1994–95, 1996–97
- UEFA Team of the Year: 2001
- Swedish Defender of the Year: 2001
- Guldbollen: 1995, 2001
