= 2022 Svenska Cupen final =

Svenska Cupen Final 2021

- Event: 2021–22 Svenska Cupen
Hammarby IF	Malmö FF
0	0
- After extra time Malmö won 4–3 on penalties
- Date: 26 May 2022
- Venue: Tele2 Arena, Stockholm
- Referee: Andreas Ekberg

== Teams ==
Team	Previous finals appearances (bold indicates winners)
Hammarby IF	4 (1976–77, 1982–83, 2009–10, **2020–21**)
Malmö FF	20 (**1944**, 1945, **1946**, **1947**, **1951**, **1953**, **1967**, 1970–71, **1972–73**, **1973–74**, **1974–75**, **1977–78**, **1979–80**, **1983–84**, **1985–86**, **1988–89**, 1995–96, 2015–16, 2017–18, 2019–20)

== Route to the final ==
Note: In all results below, the score of the finalist is given first.(H: home, A: away)

Hammarby IF		Round	Malmö FF	
Opponent	Result	Qualifying stage	Opponent	Result
Bye		Round 1	Bye	
Hudiksvalls FF	3–1 (A)	Round 2	Onsala BK	5–1 (H)
Opponent	Result	Group stage	Opponent	Result
Falkenbergs FF	2–1 (H)	Matchday 1	GAIS	5–1 (H)
Ytterhogdals IK	6–1 (A)	Matchday 2	Ängelholms FF	5–1 (A)
BK Häcken	4–0 (H)	Matchday 3	IFK Värnamo	2–0 (H)
**Group 5 winner**: Pos / Team / Pld / Pts; 1 / Hammarby IF / 3 / **9**; 2 / BK Häcken / 3 / **6**; 3 / Falkenbergs FF / 3 / **3**; 4 / Ytterhogdals IK / 3 / **0**; Updated to match(es) played on unknown. Source: Swedish Football Association		Final standings	**Group 1 winner**: Pos / Team / Pld / Pts; **1** / Malmö FF / **3** / **9**; 2 / IFK Värnamo / 3 / **6**; 3 / GAIS / 3 / **3**; 4 / Ängelholms FF / 3 / **0**; Updated to match(es) played on unknown. Source: Swedish Football Association	
Opponent	Result	Knockout stage	Opponent	Result
IFK Norrköping	3–2 (H)	Quarter-finals	AIK	3–2 (H) (a.e.t.)
IF Elfsborg	1–0 (H)	Semi-finals	Djurgårdens IF	1–0 (A)

== Match ==
=== Details ===
26 May 2022
15:00 CEST
Final

Hammarby IF	0–0 (a.e.t.)	Malmö FF
	Report
Penalties
Besara (penalty missed); Fenger (penalty scored); Trawally (penalty scored); Khalili (penalty scored); Selmani (penalty missed)	3–4	(penalty missed) Peña; (penalty scored) Birmančević; (penalty scored) Berget; (penalty scored) Olsson; (penalty scored) Toivonen

Tele2 Arena, Stockholm
Attendance: 29,214
Referee: Andreas Ekberg

**Hammarby IF**	**Malmö FF**

GK	25	(Sweden) Davor Blažević
CB	13	(Denmark) Mads Fenger
RB	2	(Sweden) Simon Sandberg (substituted off) 83'
LB	5	(Iraq) Mohanad Jeahze
CB	21	(Kosovo) Edvin Kurtulus
DM	20	(Sweden) Nahir Besara
DM	18	(Kosovo) Loret Sadiku (substituted off) 99'
DM	6	(Sweden) Darijan Bojanić (substituted off) 90'
AM	44	(Sweden) Williot Swedberg (substituted off) 83'
ST	9	(Kosovo) Astrit Selmani
AM	16	(Sweden) Gustav Ludwigson (substituted off) 83'
Substitutes:
MF	14	(Sweden) Dennis Collander (substituted on) 83'
FW	11	(The Gambia) Bubacarr Trawally (substituted on) 83'
MF	17	(Sweden) Abdul Khalili (substituted on) 90' (yellow card) 93'
MF	8	(Denmark) Jeppe Andersen (substituted on) 99'
MF	42	(Denmark) Bjørn Paulsen (substituted on) 99' (yellow card) 103'
DF	4	(Sweden) Richard Magyar
GK	27	(Sweden) Sebastian Selin
Coach:
(Spain) Martí Cifuentes

GK	30	(Mali) Ismael Diawara
LB	13	(Sweden) Martin Olsson
CB	24	(Denmark) Lasse Nielsen
CB	21	(Bosnia and Herzegovina) Dennis Hadžikadunić
RB	14	(Sweden) Felix Beijmo (substituted off) 46'
CM	5	(Denmark) Søren Rieks (substituted off) 66'
RM	32	(Norway) Jo Inge Berget (yellow card) 84'
DM	6	(Sweden) Oscar Lewicki (substituted off) 30'
DM	7	(North Macedonia) Erdal Rakip (substituted off) 105'
LM	19	(Serbia) Veljko Birmančević
ST	9	(Sweden) Isaac Kiese Thelin (substituted off) 66'
Substitutes:
MF	31	(Sweden) Hugo Larsson (substituted on) 30'
DF	2	(Sweden) Eric Larsson (substituted on) 46'
FW	11	(Sweden) Ola Toivonen (substituted on) 66' (yellow card) 76'
MF	8	(Peru) Sergio Peña (substituted on) 66'
FW	17	(Ghana) Malik Abubakari (substituted on) 105'
DF	23	(Czech Republic) Matěj Chaluš
GK	39	(Sweden) Viktor Andersson
Coach:
(Serbia) Miloš Milojević

Assistant referees:
Mehmet Culum
Fredrik Klyver
Fourth official:
Fredrik Klitte

**Match rules**

- 90 minutes.
- 30 minutes of extra time if necessary.
- Penalty shoot-out if scores still level.
- Seven named substitutes, of which up to five may be used.

== See also ==
- 2021–22 Svenska Cupen
