= 2013 Svenska Cupen final =

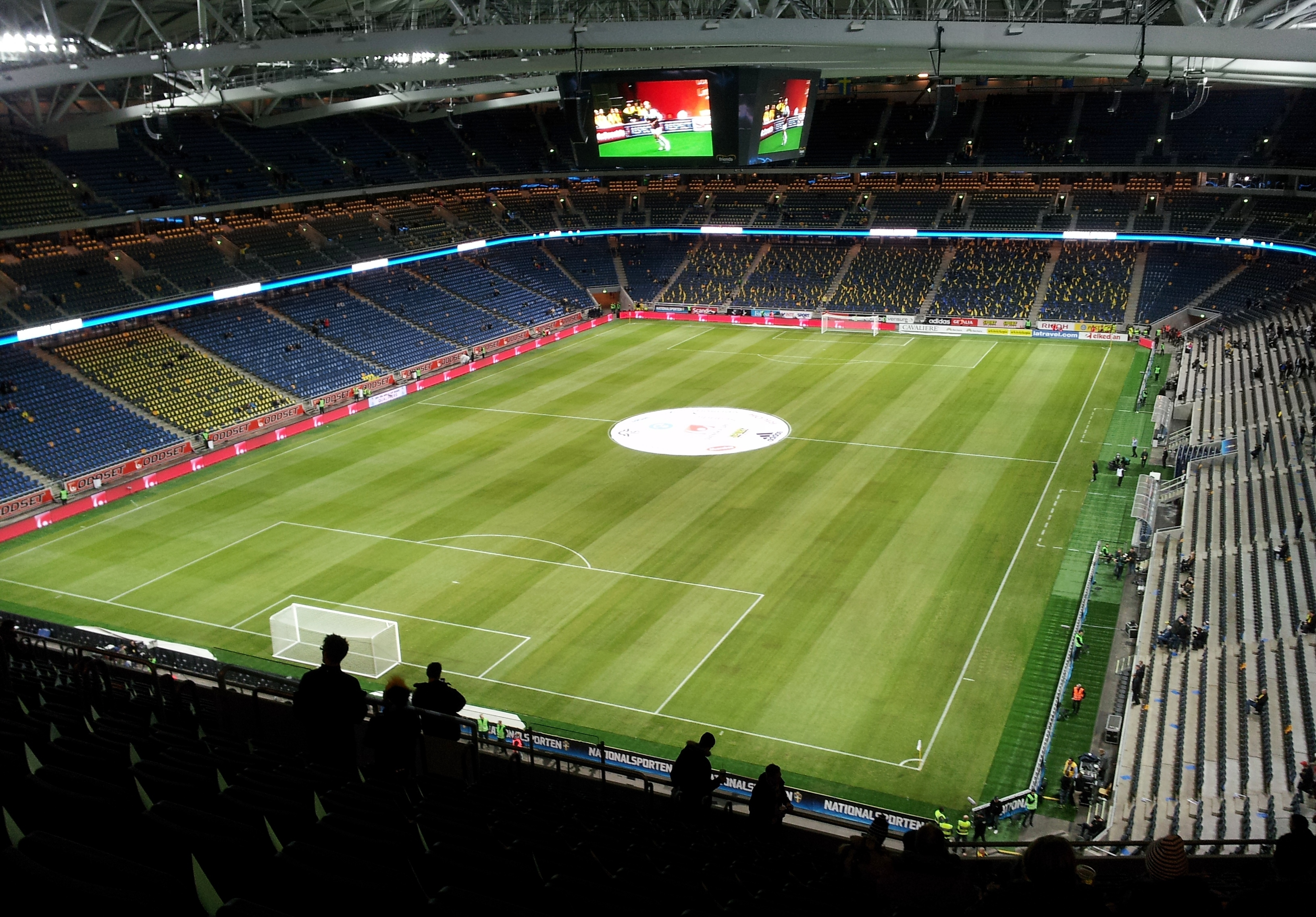
- Event: 2012–13 Svenska Cupen
IFK Göteborg	Djurgårdens IF
1	1
- IFK Göteborg won 3–1 on penalties
- Date: 26 May 2013
- Venue: Friends Arena, Solna
- Referee: Stefan Johannesson (Täby)
- Attendance: 21,819
- Weather: Rainy; 12 °C (54 °F); 92% humidity

The 2013 Svenska Cupen final was played on 26 May 2013. The match was played at the national stadium Friends Arena in Solna which was completed in November 2012 and hosted the final for the first time. The final made its return to Solna for the first time since 2009 and it was also the first time since 2006 that the final was played at a neutral venue. The final was the culmination of the 2012–13 Svenska Cupen, and the first time since 2001 that the final was held in springtime. Allsvenskan clubs Djurgårdens IF and IFK Göteborg contested the 2013 final. In Sweden the match was televised live on SVT.

IFK Göteborg won their sixth Svenska Cupen title after defeating Djurgården 3–1 on penalties after the match had finished 1–1 after extra time.

== Background ==
The match was Djurgården's eight final and IFK Göteborg's eleventh. Djurgården latest final appearance was in 2005 when they defeated Åtvidabergs FF 2–0 at Råsunda. IFK Göteborg latest final appearance was in 2009 when they lost 2–0 to AIK at Råsunda, ending a dramatic season between the two teams as AIK won the double that year, having finished four points ahead of IFK Göteborg after defeating them at Gamla Ullevi and clinching the league title in the last fixture of the season a week before the cup final. Before that IFK Göteborg had won the 2008 Svenska Cupen.

At the time of the final 10 rounds of the 2013 Allsvenskan league season had been played. IFK Göteborg got off to a good start of the season and were positioned second in the league table at the time of the final, 13 points ahead of Djurgården who were at 16th place and the bottom team in the league table after a rough start of the season. Djurgården changed managers just weeks before the cup final as previous manager Magnus Pehrsson resigned on 26 April after threats from the club's supporters. Norwegian manager Per-Mathias Høgmo was appointed on 15 May, just 11 days before the final. Høgmo had only been in charge for two league matches before the cup final.

The teams had previously faced each other once before in a Svenska Cupen final. This was in the 2004 Svenska Cupen final, that match was won by Djurgården with a 3–1 score at Råsunda.

== Road to the Final ==
Note: In all results below, the score of the finalist is given first.

Djurgårdens IF		Round	IFK Göteborg	
Opponent	Result	Qualifying stage	Opponent	Result
Dalstorps IF	5–1 (A)	Round 2	Långholmen FC	9–0 (A)
Opponent	Result	Group stage	Opponent	Result
Umeå FC	3–0 (H)	Matchday 1	IK Brage	2–0 (H)
Jönköpings Södra IF	3–1 (H)	Matchday 2	Nyköpings BIS	4–1 (A)
Åtvidabergs FF	1–1 (A)	Matchday 3	Kalmar FF	0–1 (H)
Group 8 winner: Team / Pld / W / D / L / GF / GA / GD / Pts; Djurgårdens IF / 3 / 2 / 1 / 0 / 7 / 2 / +5 / 7; Åtvidabergs FF / 3 / 1 / 1 / 1 / 5 / 4 / +1 / 4; Jönköpings Södra IF / 3 / 1 / 0 / 2 / 5 / 6 / –1 / 3; Umeå FC / 3 / 1 / 0 / 2 / 2 / 7 / –5 / 3		Final standings	Group 7 winner: Team / Pld / W / D / L / GF / GA / GD / Pts; IFK Göteborg / 3 / 2 / 0 / 1 / 6 / 2 / +4 / 6; Kalmar FF / 3 / 2 / 0 / 1 / 5 / 2 / +3 / 6; IK Brage / 3 / 1 / 0 / 2 / 3 / 6 / –3 / 3; Nyköpings BIS / 3 / 1 / 0 / 2 / 4 / 8 / –4 / 3	
Opponent	Result	Knockout stage	Opponent	Result
IFK Norrköping	0–0 (aet) (5–4 p) (A)	Quarter-finals	Helsingborgs IF	1–0 (A)
Örgryte IS	1–0 (H)	Semi-finals	Östers IF	4–1 (A)

== Match ==
The match was delayed for several minutes due to pyrotechnics and flares being set off by supporters from both teams which created a large smoke screen across the pitch. The teams were led back into the tunnel to wait for the smoke to clear. Kick-off was held at 17:16 instead of 17:00. The Swedish national anthem was sung before the start of the match.

=== Details ===
26 May 2013
17:00 UTC+2

IFK Göteborg	1–1 (a.e.t.)	Djurgårdens IF
Hysén 6'	Report	Amartey 52'
Penalties
Haglund (penalty scored); Bjärsmyr (penalty missed); Dyrestam (penalty scored); Farnerud (penalty scored)	3-1	(penalty missed) Jawo; (penalty scored) Johansson; (penalty missed) Solignac; (penalty missed) Nymann

Friends Arena, Solna
Attendance: 21,819
Referee: Stefan Johannesson (Täby)

IFK Göteborg	Djurgårdens IF

GK	1	(Sweden) John Alvbåge
DF	22	(Sweden) Adam Johansson
DF	30	(Sweden) Mattias Bjärsmyr
DF	4	(Norway) Kjetil Wæhler
DF	24	(Sweden) Mikael Dyrestam
MF	2	(Sweden) Emil Salomonsson		(substituted off) 59'
MF	5	(Sweden) Philip Haglund
MF	15	(Sweden) Jakob Johansson
MF	17	(Sweden) Sam Larsson		(substituted off) 59'
FW	11	(Sweden) Robin Söder		(substituted off) 83'
FW	7	(Sweden) Tobias Hysén (c)
Substitutes:
GK	12	(Sweden) Marcus Sandberg
MF	8	(Sweden) Nordin Gerzić
MF	10	(Brazil) Daniel Sobralense	(yellow card) 84'	(substituted on) 59'
DF	14	(Iceland) Hjálmar Jónsson
FW	19	(Sweden) Hannes Stiller
MF	21	(Sweden) Pontus Farnerud		(substituted on) 59'
FW	26	(Sweden) David Moberg Karlsson		(substituted on) 83'
Manager:
(Sweden) Mikael Stahre

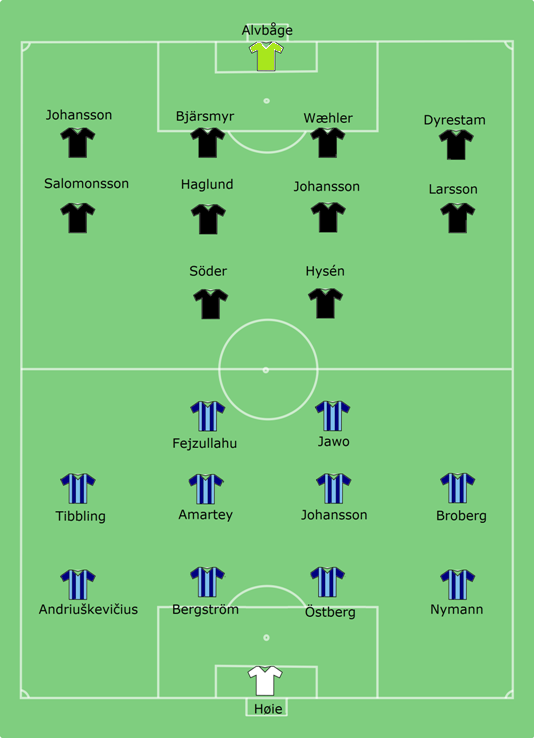

GK	12	(Norway) Kenneth Høie
DF	6	(Denmark) Peter Nymann
DF	14	(Sweden) Mattias Östberg	(yellow card) 90+2'
DF	13	(Sweden) Emil Bergström
DF	27	(Lithuania) Vytautas Andriuškevičius		(substituted off) 43'
MF	7	(Sweden) Martin Broberg		(substituted off) 76'
MF	8	(Sweden) Andreas Johansson (c)
MF	18	(Ghana) Daniel Amartey	(yellow card) 16'
MF	20	(Sweden) Simon Tibbling
FW	11	(Sweden) Amadou Jawo
FW	10	(Sweden) Erton Fejzullahu
Substitutes:
GK	23	(Sweden) Hampus Nilsson
DF	3	(Denmark) Marc Pedersen
MF	4	(Ghana) Yussif Chibsah		(substituted on) 63'
FW	9	(Argentina) Luis Solignac		(substituted on) 76'
MF	19	(Sweden) Nahir Oyal
FW	21	(Ghana) Godsway Donyoh
DF	26	(Sweden) Jesper Arvidsson		(substituted on) 43'	(substituted off) 63'
Manager:
(Norway) Per-Mathias Høgmo

Assistant referees:
Henrik Andrén (Hammarö)
Fredrik Nilsson (Svalöv)
Fourth official:
Daniel Wärnmark (Knivsta)

Match rules

- 90 minutes.
- 30 minutes of extra time if necessary.
- Penalty shoot-out if scores still level.
- Seven named substitutes.
- Maximum of three substitutions.

=== Statistics ===
First half
	IFK Göteborg	Djurgårdens IF
Goals scored	1	0
Shots on target	3	2
Corner kicks	1	1
Fouls committed	7	6
Offsides	2	1
Yellow cards	0	1
Red cards	0	0

Second half
	IFK Göteborg	Djurgårdens IF
Goals scored	0	1
Shots on target	1	3
Corner kicks	1	2
Fouls committed	5	4
Offsides	2	0
Yellow cards	1	1
Red cards	0	0

Extra time
	IFK Göteborg	Djurgårdens IF
Goals scored	0	0
Shots on target	1	1
Corner kicks	3	2
Fouls committed	1	5
Offsides	0	0
Yellow cards	0	0
Red cards	0	0

Overall
	IFK Göteborg	Djurgårdens IF
Goals scored	1	1
Shots on target	5	6
Ball possession	52%	48%
Corner kicks	5	5
Fouls committed	13	15
Offsides	4	1
Yellow cards	1	2
Red cards	0	0

== See also ==
- 2012–13 Svenska Cupen
