= Conny Andersson (footballer) =

Swedish footballer (born 1945)

Personal information
- Full name: Conny Andersson
- Date of birth: 8 April 1945 (age 81)
- Place of birth: Sweden
- Position: Forward

Senior career*
| Years | Team | Apps | (Gls) |
| –1971 | IFK Malmö | | |
| 1971–1976 | Malmö FF | 89 | (31) |

International career
| 1973 | Sweden | 4 | (0) |
- * Club domestic league appearances and goals

Conny Andersson (born 8 April 1945) is a Swedish former footballer.

Andersson was known as the "Butcher of Hardeberga". When he transferred from IFK Malmö to Malmö FF in 1971 he became Sweden's most expensive football transfer.

== Honours ==
=== Club ===
Malmö FF

- Allsvenskan: 1971, 1974, 1975
- Svenska Cupen: 1972-73, 1973–74, 1974-75
