= Staffan Tapper =

Swedish footballer

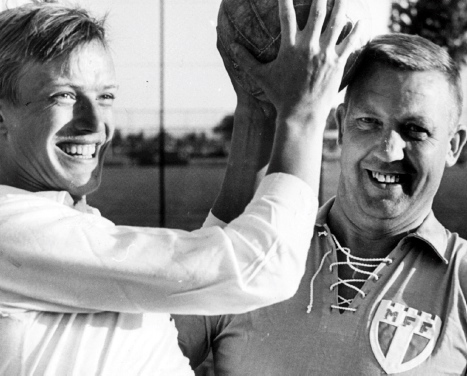
- Staffan and Börje Tapper

Personal information
- Full name: Staffan Lars Anders Tapper
- Date of birth: 10 July 1948 (age 78)
- Place of birth: Malmö, Sweden
- Height: 1.90 m (6 ft 3 in)
- Position: Midfielder

Team information
- Current team: Malmö FF (youth talent coach)

Senior career*
Years	Team	Apps	(Gls)
1968–1979	Malmö FF	220	(42)

International career
1964	Sweden U17	1	(0)
1964–1966	Sweden U19	13	(0)
1968–1972	Sweden U21	22	(6)
1971–1978	Sweden	36	(3)
- * Club domestic league appearances and goals

Staffan Lars Anders Tapper (born 10 July 1948) is a Swedish former footballer who played as a midfielder for Malmö FF and the Sweden national team. A full international between 1971 and 1978, he won 36 caps for Sweden and played at the 1974 and 1978 FIFA World Cups.

== Career ==
Playing for Malmö FF, his career there was successful, becoming Swedish champion in 1974, 1975 and 1977, as well as runner-up in the European Cup 1979 (a 0–1 defeat to Nottingham Forest). He represented the Sweden national team at the 1974 and 1978 World Cups as well as on a number of other occasions. However, many remember him for missing a penalty kick against Poland at the 1974 World Cup. For some time, Tapper was first team coach at Malmö FF; he later resigned from that role to become youth talent coach.

== Personal life ==
He is the son of Börje Tapper.

== Career statistics ==
=== International ===
Appearances and goals by national team and year
National team	Year	Apps	Goals
Sweden	1971	1	0
Sweden	1972	2	0
Sweden	1973	9	1
Sweden	1974	11	1
Sweden	1975	3	0
Sweden	1976	5	1
Sweden	1977	0	0
Sweden	1978	5	0
Total		36	3

Scores and results list Sweden's goal tally first, score column indicates score after each Tapper goal.

List of international goals scored by Staffan Tapper
No.	Date	Venue	Opponent	Score	Result	Competition	Ref.
1	11 July 1973	Rimnersvallen, Uddevalla, Sweden	Iceland	1–0	1–0	Friendly	
2	8 August 1974	Ullevi, Gothenburg, Sweden	Norway	2–1	2–1	1972–77 Nordic Football Championship	
3	2 March 1976	Stade du 5 Juillet, Algiers, Algeria	Algeria	2–0	2–0	Friendly	

== Honours ==
Malmö FF

- Allsvenskan: 1974, 1975, 1977
- European Cup runner-up: 1979

Sporting positions
Preceded by Krister Kristensson	Malmö FF; Captain; 1979	Succeeded by Roland Andersson
