= Jan Connman =

Swedish footballer

Elof Jan Connman was a goalkeeper in the Swedish football club IFK Norrköping. He was born in October 26, 1942.

Jan also made an appearance in the Swedish movie The Unthinkable, in which he portrayed himself.
