= Per-Olof Erixon =

Swedish footballer

Personal information
- Date of birth: 23 January 1952 (age 74)
- Position: Defender

Youth career
- Danderyds SK

Senior career*
Years	Team	Apps	(Gls)
1971–1977	Djurgården		

International career
1969	Sweden U19	3	(0)
- * Club domestic league appearances and goals

Per-Olof Erixon (born 23 January 1952) is a Swedish retired footballer who played as a defender.

Originally from Danderyds SK, Erixon represented Djurgården 1971–77. Erixon made 72 Allsvenskan appearances for Djurgården and scored one goal. He made three appearances for the Sweden men's national under-19 football team in 1969.
