= Freddie Forsland =

Swedish footballer

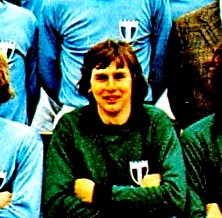
- 1973

Personal information
- Full name: Freddie Forsland
- Position: Goalkeeper

Senior career*
Years	Team	Apps	(Gls)
1969–1973	Malmö FF	36	(0)
- * Club domestic league appearances and goals

Freddie Forsland is a Swedish former footballer who played as a goalkeeper.
