= Björn Friberg =

Swedish footballer (1948–2024)

Personal information
- Date of birth: 1948
- Date of death: 17 July 2024 (aged 75)
- Position: Midfielder

Senior career*
Years	Team	Apps	(Gls)
1967–1973	Malmö FF	64	(4)
- * Club domestic league appearances and goals

Björn Friberg (1948 – 17 July 2024) was a Swedish footballer who played as a midfielder. He died on 17 July 2024, at the age of 75.
