= Per Lövfors =

Swedish footballer

Senior career*
Years	Team	Apps	(Gls)
- Djurgården
- * Club domestic league appearances and goals

Per Lövfors is a Swedish retired footballer. Lövfors made 87 Allsvenskan appearances for Djurgården and scored 16 goals.
