= Kjell Karlsson (footballer, born 1953) =

Swedish footballer

Personal information
- Date of birth: 20 June 1953 (age 73)
- Position: Defender

Senior career*
Years	Team	Apps	(Gls)
- Djurgården
- * Club domestic league appearances and goals

Kjell Karlsson (born 20 June 1953) is a Swedish former footballer who played as a defender. He made 84 Allsvenskan appearances for Djurgårdens IF and scored 18 goals.
