= Bengt Persson (football manager) =

Swedish football manager

Managerial career
- Years: Team
- 1975–1978: Djurgårdens IF
- 1982-1984: Hammarby IF

Bengt Persson is a Swedish football manager. He was Djurgårdens IF manager in 1975–78. Later in his career for rivals Hammarby IF.
