= Ulf Kleander =

Swedish footballer

Personal information
- Full name: Ulf Kleander
- Date of birth: 7 January 1947 (age 79)
- Position: Defender

Senior career*
Years	Team	Apps	(Gls)
1956–1957	Veberöd AIF		
1958–1961	Torups BK		
1961–1967	Trelleborgs FF		
1967–1973	Malmö FF	57	(3)
1974–1981	Trelleborgs FF		
- * Club domestic league appearances and goals

Ulf Kleander (born 7 January 1947) is a Swedish former footballer who played as a defender.
