= Tommy Larsson =

Swedish footballer

Personal information
- Full name: Tommy Larsson
- Date of birth: 7 September 1951 (age 75)
- Place of birth: Sweden
- Position: Midfielder

Senior career*
Years	Team	Apps	(Gls)
1969–1978	Malmö FF	134	(26)
1979–1984	Landskrona BoIS	96	(13)

International career
1975–1977	Sweden	4	(0)
- * Club domestic league appearances and goals

Tommy Larsson (born 7 September 1951) is a Swedish former footballer who played as a midfielder.
