= 2016 Svenska Cupen final =

- Event: 2015–16 Svenska Cupen
Malmö FF	BK Häcken
2	2
- BK Häcken won 6–5 on penalties
- Date: 5 May 2016
- Venue: Swedbank Stadion, Malmö
- Referee: Andreas Ekberg (Lund)
- Attendance: 22,302

The 2016 Svenska Cupen final was played on 5 May 2016. The match was played at Swedbank Stadion, Malmö, the home ground of Malmö FF, determined in a draw on 21 March 2016 after the semi-finals. The final was the culmination of the 2015–16 Svenska Cupen.

Allsvenskan clubs Malmö FF and BK Häcken contested the 2016 final, with the winner earning a place in the second qualifying round of the 2016–17 UEFA Europa League. Malmö FF played their first final since 1996 and their 18th final in total, BK Häcken played their first final since 1990 and their second final in total. BK Häcken won their first Svenska Cupen title after defeating Malmö FF 6–5 on penalties after the match had finished 2–2 after extra time.

== Route to the final ==
Note: In all results below, the score of the finalist is given first.

Malmö FF		Round	BK Häcken	
Opponent	Result	Initial rounds	Opponent	Result
Götene IF	5–0 (A)	Second round	Husqvarna FF	3–2 (A)
Opponent	Result	Group stage	Opponent	Result
IK Sirius	2–1 (H)	Matchday 1	IF Brommapojkarna	0–0 (H)
Ängelholms FF	4–1 (A)	Matchday 2	FC Trollhättan	6–2 (A)
GIF Sundsvall	4–0 (H)	Matchday 3	Gefle IF	4–0 (H)
Group 5 winner: Pos / Team / Pld / Pts; 1 / Malmö FF / 3 / 9; 2 / IK Sirius / 3 / 4; 3 / GIF Sundsvall / 3 / 3; 4 / Ängelholms FF / 3 / 1; Source: Swedish Football Association		Final standings	Group 7 winner: Pos / Team / Pld / Pts; 1 / BK Häcken / 3 / 7; 2 / FC Trollhättan / 3 / 4; 3 / Gefle IF / 3 / 3; 4 / IF Brommapojkarna / 3 / 2; Source: Swedish Football Association	
Opponent	Result	Knockout stage	Opponent	Result
IFK Norrköping	1–0 (H)	Quarter-finals	Halmstads BK	1–0 (H)
Kalmar FF	3–2 (A)	Semi-finals	Hammarby IF	3–2 (A)

== Match ==
=== Details ===
5 May 2016
15:30 CEST (UTC+2)

Malmö FF	2–2 (a.e.t.)	BK Häcken
Rosenberg 39'; Eikrem 44'	Report	Savage 61'; Mohammed 66'
Penalties
Molins (penalty scored); Sana (penalty scored); Berget (penalty scored); Christiansen (penalty scored); Rakip (penalty missed); Arnason (penalty scored); Tinnerholm (penalty missed)	5–6	(penalty scored) Savage; (penalty missed) Makondele; (penalty scored) Gustafson; (penalty scored) Mohammed; (penalty scored) Paulinho; (penalty scored) Arkivuo; (penalty scored) Sandberg

Swedbank Stadion, Malmö
Attendance: 22,302
Referee: Andreas Ekberg (Lund)

Malmö FF	BK Häcken

GK	1	(Sweden) Johan Wiland
RB	3	(Sweden) Anton Tinnerholm
CB	21	(Iceland) Kári Árnason
CB	31	(Sweden) Franz Brorsson
LB	2	(Sweden) Pa Konate
RM	23	(Norway) Jo Inge Berget	(yellow card) 45+2'
CM	6	(Sweden) Oscar Lewicki	(red card) 51'
CM	7	(Denmark) Anders Christiansen
LM	19	(Norway) Magnus Wolff Eikrem		(substituted off) 79'
FW	24	(Iceland) Viðar Örn Kjartansson		(substituted off) 100'
FW	9	(Sweden) Markus Rosenberg (c)	(yellow card) 45+1'	(substituted off) 64'
Substitutes:
GK	29	(Sweden) Fredrik Andersson
MF	5	(Sweden) Erdal Rakip		(substituted on) 64'
MF	8	(Ghana) Enoch Kofi Adu
FW	10	(Sweden) Guillermo Molins		(substituted on) 100'
DF	13	(Peru) Yoshimar Yotún
MF	22	(Sweden) Tobias Sana	(yellow card) 117'	(substituted on) 79'
DF	25	(Uruguay) Felipe Carvalho
Manager:
(Denmark) Allan Kuhn

GK	26	(Sweden) Peter Abrahamsson
RB	23	(Sweden) Simon Sandberg
CB	3	(Sweden) Jasmin Sudić
CB	5	(Sweden) Emil Wahlström
LB	15	(Finland) Kari Arkivuo	(yellow card) 43'
CM	12	(Ghana) Mohammed Abubakari		(substituted off) 90'
CM	22	(Sweden) Samuel Gustafson	(yellow card) 117'
CM	14	(Sweden) Martin Ericsson (c)		(substituted off) 62'
RW	21	(Ghana) Nasiru Mohammed	(yellow card) 33'
CF	18	(Sweden) Alexander Jeremejeff	(yellow card) 45'	(substituted off) 91'
LW	8	(The Gambia) Demba Savage
Substitutes:
GK	1	(Sweden) Christoffer Källqvist
MF	7	(Netherlands) Niels Vorthoren
FW	10	(Brazil) Paulinho		(substituted on) 62'
DF	13	(Ghana) Baba Mensah
FW	19	(Nigeria) John Owoeri		(substituted on) 91'
FW	24	(Democratic Republic of the Congo) René Makondele		(substituted on) 90'
DF	27	(Sweden) Joel Andersson
Manager:
(Sweden) Peter Gerhardsson

Assistant referees:
Mehmet Culum (Arlöv)
Stefan Hallberg (Gothenburg)
Fourth official:
Robert Daradic (Helsingborg)

Match rules

- 90 minutes.
- 30 minutes of extra time if necessary.
- Penalty shoot-out if scores still level.
- Seven named substitutes, of which up to three may be used.

== See also ==
- 2015–16 Svenska Cupen
