= Nils Hult =

Swedish footballer

Personal information
- Full name: Nils Gunnar Hult
- Date of birth: 14 August 1939 (age 87)
- Place of birth: Lund, Sweden
- Position: Goalkeeper

Senior career*
Years	Team	Apps	(Gls)
1960–1961	Malmö FF	4	(0)
1962	GIF Nike		
1963–1972	Malmö FF	180	(0)

International career
1966–1968	Sweden	2	(0)
- * Club domestic league appearances and goals

Nils Gunnar Hult (born 14 August 1939) is a Swedish former footballer who played the majority of his career at Malmö FF as a goalkeeper. He also represented Team Sweden.
