= Christer Jacobsson =

Swedish footballer

Personal information
- Full name: Christer Jacobsson
- Position: Defender

Senior career*
Years	Team	Apps	(Gls)
1969–1975	Malmö FF	65	(1)
1977–1980	Landskrona BoIS	23	(0)
- * Club domestic league appearances and goals

Christer Jacobsson is a Swedish former footballer who played as a defender.
