= Curt Olsberg =

Swedish footballer

Personal information
- Full name: Curt Olsberg
- Date of birth: 23 May 1945 (age 81)
- Place of birth: Sweden
- Position: Midfielder

Senior career*
Years	Team	Apps	(Gls)
–1964	Hovmantorps GoIF		
1965–1967	Växjö BK		
1967–1973	Malmö FF	126	(35)
1974–1979	Djurgårdens IF	125	(17)
1980	Helenelunds IK		

International career
	Sweden U23	2	(0)
1971–1975	Sweden	3	(0)
- * Club domestic league appearances and goals

Curt Olsberg (born 23 May 1945) is a Swedish former footballer who played as a midfielder.
