= 2005 Svenska Cupen final =

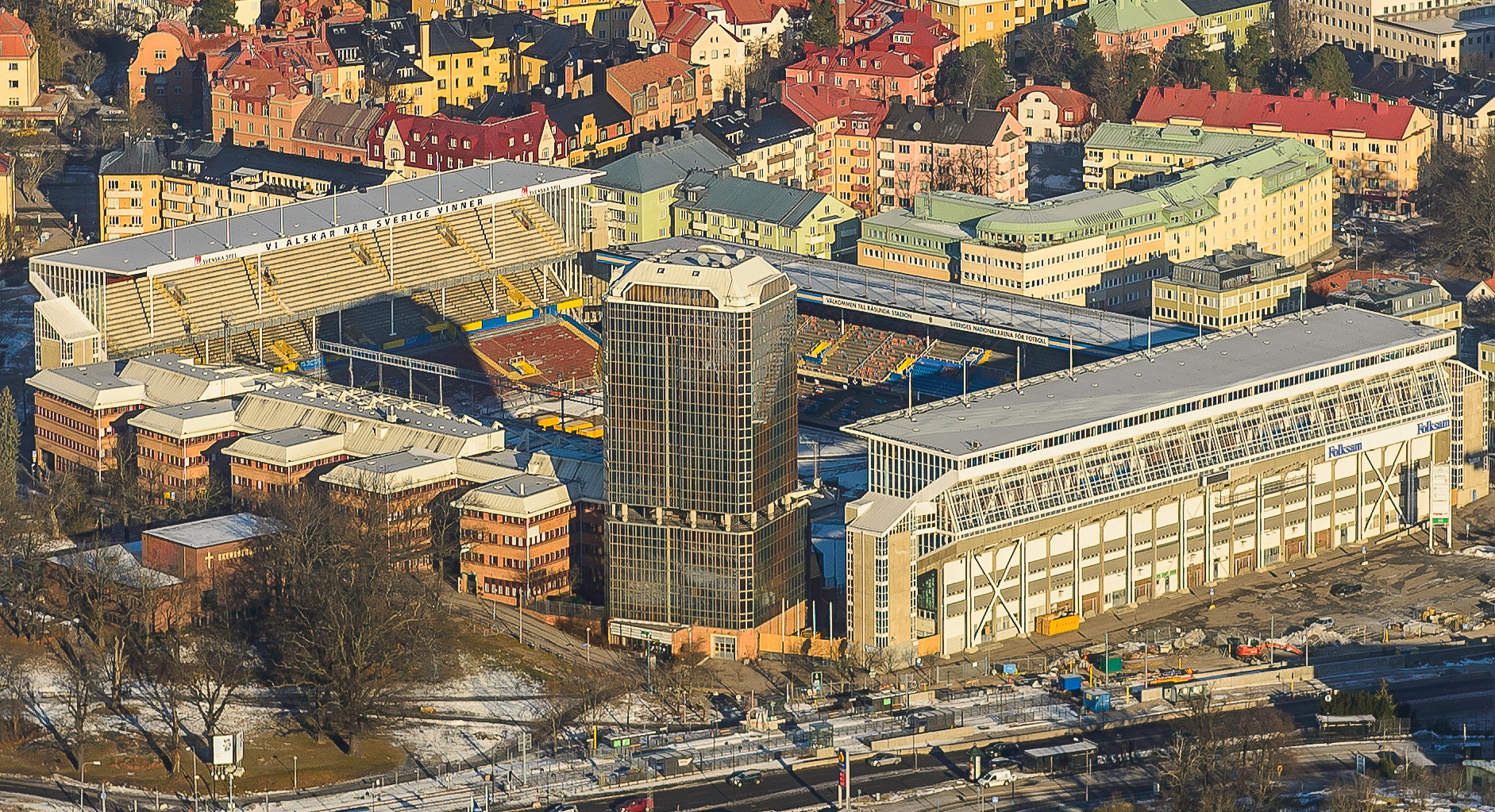
- Event: 2005 Svenska Cupen
Djurgårdens IF	Åtvidabergs FF
2	0
- Date: 29 October 2005
- Venue: Råsunda Stadium, Solna
- Referee: Martin Hansson (Täby)
- Attendance: 11,613
- Weather: Cloudy; 8 °C (46 °F)

The 2013 Svenska Cupen final was played on 29 October 2005. The match was played at the Råsunda Stadium in Solna.

== Road to the Final ==
Note: In all results below, the score of the finalist is given first.

Djurgårdens IF		Round	Åtvidabergs FF
Opponent	Result		Opponent	Result
Rynninge IK	3–1	Round 2	Kinna IF	2–1
Väsby United	2–0	Round 3	Östersunds FK	3–2
Enskede IK	5–1	Round 4	Trelleborgs FF	1–0
IFK Ölme	6–0	Quarter-finals	GAIS	1–1 (a.e.t.)(5–4 pen)
IF Elfsborg	2–1	Semi-finals	IFK Norrköping	1–0

== Match details ==
29 October 2005
15:30

Djurgårdens IF	2–0	Åtvidabergs FF
Kuivasto 36'; Hysén 89'	Report

Råsunda, Solna
Attendance: 11,613
Referee: Martin Hansson (Holmsjö)

DJURGÅRDEN:
GK	30	(Sweden) Oskar Wahlström
DF	2	(Sweden) Matias Concha
DF	6	(Finland) Toni Kuivasto
DF	16	(Sweden) Markus Johannesson
DF	3	(Sweden) Fredrik Stenman
MF	7	(Sweden) Johan Arneng
MF	11	(Finland) Daniel Sjölund	(substituted off) 71'
MF	77	(Sweden) Abgar Barsom
FW	12	(Sweden) Mattias Jonson	(substituted off) 77'
FW	9	(Ghana) Jones Kusi-Asare	(substituted off) 64'
FW	8	(Sweden) Tobias Hysén
Substitutes:
FW		(South Africa) Siyabonga Nomvethe	(substituted on) 64'
MF	14	(Iceland) Kári Árnason	(substituted on) 71'
FW	25	(Sweden) Patrick Amoah	(substituted on) 77'
Manager:
(Sweden) Kjell Jonevret

MATCH RULES

- 90 minutes.
- 30 minutes of extra-time if necessary.
- Penalty shoot-out if scores still level.
- Seven named substitutes.
- Maximum of three substitutions.
