= Roland Andersson =

Swedish football player and coach (born 1950)

Personal information
- Full name: Åke-Erik Roland Andersson
- Date of birth: 28 March 1950 (age 76)
- Place of birth: Malmö, Sweden
- Position: Defender

Youth career
- BK Olympic

Senior career*
Years	Team	Apps	(Gls)
–1967	Kävlinge GIF		
1968–1974	Malmö FF	146	(44)
1975–1976	Djurgårdens IF	45	(2)
1977–1983	Malmö FF	161	(6)

International career
	Sweden U18	19	(2)
	Sweden U23	14	(1)
1974–1978	Sweden	19	(0)

Managerial career
- 1983–1985: Malmö FF (youth teams)
- 1985–1987: Al-Ittihad (assistant)
- 1988–1990: Lunds BK
- 1991–1992: Malmö FF (assistant coach)
- 1993: Al-Ittihad
- 1994: Malmö FF (assistant coach)
- 1995–1997: Qatar SC
- 1997–1998: BSC Young Boys
- 1998–1999: Malmö FF
- 2002–2003: Al-Shaab
- 2004–2009: Sweden (assistant coach)
- 2010: Nigeria (assistant coach)
- * Club domestic league appearances and goals

Åke-Erik Roland Andersson (born 28 March 1950) is a Swedish former football player and coach. His most recent job was that as the assistant coach of the Nigeria national team under Lars Lagerbäck.

== Playing career ==
As a player, Andersson played for Malmö FF and Djurgårdens IF and was a part of the Swedish squad in the 1978 FIFA World Cup in Argentina.

== Managerial career ==
As a coach, Andersson has coached at Al-Shaab (United Arab Emirates), BSC Young Boys (Switzerland), Al-Ittihad (Saudi Arabia), Qatar SC (Qatar) and Malmö FF. His was assistant coach for the Sweden national team, appointed in 2004 by Lars Lagerbäck. In 2010, Andersson was appointed Head of Development and Scouting on a consulting basis at his former club Malmö FF. However this did not last for very long; in February 2010, he was appointed assistant coach at Nigeria under former colleague Lars Lagerbäck. Currently Andersson works as an analyst for the Icelandic national football team.

== Honours ==
Malmö FF

- Allsvenskan: 1970, 1971, 1974, 1977
- Svenska Cupen: 1973, 1974, 1978, 1980
