= Christer Malmberg =

Swedish footballer

Personal information
- Full name: Christer Malmberg
- Position: Midfielder

Senior career*
Years	Team	Apps	(Gls)
1966–1975	Malmö FF	43	(5)
- * Club domestic league appearances and goals

Christer Malmberg is a Swedish former footballer who played as a midfielder. He played most of his games for Malmö FF.
