= 1975 Allsvenskan =

51st season of Allsvenskan

Allsvenskan
- Season: 1975
- Champions: Malmö FF
- Relegated: GAIS; GIF Sundsvall
- European Cup: Malmö FF
- UEFA Cup: Östers IF; Djurgårdens IF
- Top goalscorer: Jan Mattsson, Östers IF (31)
- Average attendance: 6,598

Statistics of Allsvenskan in season 1975.

== Overview ==
The league was contested by 14 teams, with Malmö FF winning the championship.

== League table ==
Pos	Team	Pld	W	D	L	GF	GA	GD	Pts	Qualification or relegation
1	Malmö FF (C)	26	18	6	2	53	17	+36	42	Qualification to European Cup first round
2	Östers IF	26	16	5	5	66	26	+40	37	Qualification to UEFA Cup first round
3	Djurgårdens IF	26	13	8	5	36	25	+11	34	Qualification to UEFA Cup first round
4	Landskrona BoIS	26	9	12	5	32	32	0	30	
5	AIK	26	12	5	9	43	30	+13	29	Qualification to Cup Winners' Cup first round (Note: AIK qualified for the European Cup Winners' Cup as Svenska Cupen champions 1975–76.)
6	Åtvidabergs FF	26	10	6	10	31	39	−8	26	
7	Örebro SK	26	8	9	9	34	35	−1	25	
8	IFK Norrköping	26	8	7	11	44	49	−5	23	
9	IF Elfsborg	26	8	7	11	35	45	−10	23	
10	Hammarby IF	26	8	6	12	39	44	−5	22	
11	Örgryte IS	26	7	7	12	31	42	−11	21	
12	Halmstads BK	26	5	9	12	28	36	−8	19	
13	GAIS (R)	26	6	7	13	24	41	−17	19	Relegation to Division 2
14	GIF Sundsvall (R)	26	4	6	16	21	56	−35	14	Relegation to Division 2

Rules for classification: 1) points; 2) goal difference; 3) number of goals scored.
(C) Champions; (R) Relegated

== Results ==
Home \ Away	AIK	DIF	GAIS	GIF	HBK	HIF	IFE	IFK	BOIS	MFF	ÅFF	ÖSK	ÖIS	ÖIF
AIK		1–2	3–1	3–0	1–0	4–1	3–0	3–1	2–2	1–2	1–2	1–1	1–1	2–4
Djurgårdens IF	0–0		4–0	2–1	0–0	3–2	2–0	1–2	0–2	0–0	2–0	1–0	3–1	3–2
GAIS	2–1	1–2		1–0	0–1	3–1	1–2	1–1	3–1	2–0	0–1	0–4	1–1	0–2
GIF Sundsvall	0–1	2–1	0–0		1–1	2–2	2–0	3–2	2–2	0–2	0–2	0–1	2–1	0–4
Halmstads BK	2–1	0–1	1–0	5–0		2–0	0–2	3–3	1–2	2–3	1–2	0–1	0–0	2–4
Hammarby IF	1–0	1–2	3–1	0–0	1–1		2–1	2–0	3–0	0–2	2–2	4–1	3–0	1–2
IF Elfsborg	2–1	2–2	2–1	2–0	4–1	2–2		4–1	1–1	1–2	1–2	1–1	2–1	1–6
IFK Norrköping	2–2	1–0	4–0	4–1	2–2	4–2	3–0		2–4	3–2	1–1	1–3	1–2	0–3
Landskrona BoIS	1–2	1–1	0–0	2–0	1–1	1–0	1–1	0–0		0–5	1–1	2–1	0–0	2–2
Malmö FF	1–0	4–1	2–0	4–1	0–0	2–2	2–0	2–0	3–0		3–0	1–1	5–2	2–0
Åtvidabergs FF	0–2	0–1	2–2	4–1	1–0	2–1	2–0	2–4	0–3	1–1		2–0	0–2	0–1
Örebro SK	1–2	0–0	1–1	3–1	1–1	2–1	2–2	1–1	1–2	0–0	3–0		1–4	2–0
Örgryte IS	1–4	0–0	1–2	2–2	2–1	1–2	2–0	2–1	0–1	0–1	1–1	3–1		1–3
Östers IF	0–1	2–2	1–1	5–0	3–0	4–0	2–2	3–0	0–0	0–2	5–1	4–1	4–0	

Legend: Blue = home team win; Yellow = draw; Red = away team win.

== Attendances ==
#	Club	Average attendance	Highest attendance
1	Malmö FF	11,474	25,077
2	AIK	10,192	40,669
3	Hammarby IF	8,031	20,327
4	Djurgårdens IF	7,940	28,693
5	IF Elfsborg	6,991	9,813
6	IFK Norrköping	6,131	13,382
7	GAIS	6,110	11,754
8	Östers IF	6,012	14,272
9	Örebro SK	5,748	8,233
10	Halmstads BK	5,739	9,703
11	Örgryte IS	5,279	16,719
12	Landskrona BoIS	5,039	17,696
13	GIF Sundsvall	4,727	6,752
14	Åtvidabergs FF	2,936	8,853
