= Roy Andersson (footballer) =

Swedish footballer

Personal information
- Full name: Bror Roy Andersson
- Date of birth: 2 August 1949 (age 77)
- Place of birth: Kirseberg, Sweden
- Height: 1.78 m (5 ft 10 in)
- Position: Defender

Senior career*
Years	Team	Apps	(Gls)
1968–1983	Malmö FF	327	(21)

International career
1974–1978	Sweden	20	(0)
- * Club domestic league appearances and goals

Bror Roy Andersson (born 2 August 1949) is a Swedish former footballer who played as a defender. He won 20 caps for the Sweden national team, and played three matches at the 1978 FIFA World Cup.

He was a strong central defender for Malmö FF and was awarded Guldbollen (the golden ball) in 1977. His two sons, Patrik and Daniel, are both Swedish former international footballers.

== Career statistics ==
=== International ===
Appearances and goals by national team and year
National team	Year	Apps	Goals
Sweden	1974	1	0
Sweden	1975	2	0
Sweden	1976	–	
Sweden	1977	10	0
Sweden	1978	7	0
Total		20	0
