= Harry Jönsson =

Swedish footballer

Personal information
- Full name: Harry Jönsson
- Date of birth: 28 November 1943 (age 82)
- Place of birth: Sweden
- Position: Forward

Senior career*
Years	Team	Apps	(Gls)
1967–1976	Malmö FF	194	(18)
- * Club domestic league appearances and goals

Harry Jönsson (born 28 November 1943) is a Swedish former footballer who played the majority of his career at Malmö FF as a forward.
