= 1974 Allsvenskan =

50th season of Allsvenskan

Allsvenskan
- Season: 1974
- Champions: Malmö FF
- Relegated: IK Sirius; Brynäs IF
- European Cup: Malmö FF
- UEFA Cup: AIK; Östers IF; GAIS
- Top goalscorer: Jan Mattsson, Östers IF (22)
- Average attendance: 6,448

Statistics of Allsvenskan in season 1974.

== Overview ==
The league was contested by 14 teams, with Malmö FF winning the championship.

== League table ==
Pos	Team	Pld	W	D	L	GF	GA	GD	Pts	Qualification or relegation
1	Malmö FF (C)	26	19	5	2	48	15	+33	43	Qualification to European Cup first round
2	AIK	26	15	4	7	40	28	+12	34	Qualification to UEFA Cup first round
3	Östers IF	26	13	7	6	55	26	+29	33	Qualification to UEFA Cup first round
4	GAIS	26	12	5	9	44	40	+4	29	Qualification to UEFA Cup first round
5	Åtvidabergs FF	26	11	5	10	48	40	+8	27	
6	IF Elfsborg	26	10	6	10	55	43	+12	26	
7	Landskrona BoIS	26	11	4	11	43	36	+7	26	
8	Djurgårdens IF	26	9	8	9	44	38	+6	26	Qualification to Cup Winners' Cup first round (Note: Djurgården qualified for the European Cup Winners' Cup as Svenska Cupen runners-up 1974–75.)
9	Hammarby IF	26	10	5	11	37	44	−7	25	
10	Örebro SK	26	8	7	11	42	50	−8	23	
11	Halmstads BK	26	7	9	10	28	38	−10	23	
12	IFK Norrköping	26	7	7	12	39	60	−21	21	
13	IK Sirius (R)	26	4	8	14	28	57	−29	16	Relegation to Division 2
14	Brynäs (R)	26	2	8	16	27	63	−36	12	Relegation to Division 2

Rules for classification: 1) points; 2) goal difference; 3) number of goals scored.
(C) Champions; (R) Relegated

== Results ==
Home \ Away	AIK	BIF	DIF	GAIS	HBK	HIF	IFE	IFK	IKS	BOIS	MFF	ÅFF	ÖSK	ÖIF
AIK		2–2	3–2	0–1	1–0	2–0	4–2	2–0	0–0	1–0	1–0	1–0	3–0	2–1
Brynäs	1–4		0–2	0–0	1–1	2–3	1–4	4–0	3–3	0–2	0–1	1–1	3–2	0–1
Djurgårdens IF	0–2	5–0		1–3	3–3	2–0	3–0	5–0	3–1	2–0	0–2	2–1	1–1	0–0
GAIS	0–1	2–2	2–1		2–1	0–1	2–2	1–2	3–1	2–1	2–3	3–1	2–0	1–2
Halmstads BK	1–0	2–1	1–1	0–0		1–0	1–1	2–1	1–1	0–0	0–1	2–0	0–1	1–3
Hammarby IF	1–0	2–0	2–0	0–4	3–2		4–2	0–0	3–1	1–1	0–4	1–1	1–2	1–1
IF Elfsborg	1–3	1–1	3–1	5–1	4–1	5–2		6–2	2–2	3–1	0–1	0–1	3–2	0–0
IFK Norrköping	0–2	5–1	2–2	1–1	3–0	3–3	0–3		2–1	0–4	3–3	4–2	3–2	1–4
IK Sirius	1–1	1–1	1–3	0–6	0–1	0–6	1–0	2–1		3–1	0–0	1–0	2–2	2–3
Landskrona BoIS	2–0	3–2	2–2	5–0	2–3	1–0	1–0	0–1	3–1		1–2	2–3	3–0	3–0
Malmö FF	2–1	6–0	0–0	3–0	3–2	1–0	4–3	2–0	1–0	1–2		2–0	3–0	1–0
Åtvidabergs FF	3–2	5–0	5–1	5–1	1–1	1–2	1–1	1–1	2–0	7–2	0–1		2–1	2–1
Örebro SK	2–2	3–1	3–1	1–2	1–1	2–1	3–2	3–3	4–1	2–1	0–0	2–3		2–5
Östers IF	6–0	2–0	1–1	1–3	4–0	5–0	0–2	4–1	5–2	0–0	0–0	5–0	1–1	

Legend: Blue = home team win; Yellow = draw; Red = away team win.

== Attendances ==
#	Club	Average attendance	Highest attendance
1	AIK	10,422	30,674
2	Malmö FF	10,356	24,746
3	Hammarby IF	8,673	25,906
4	IF Elfsborg	7,743	11,215
5	Djurgårdens IF	7,558	32,527
6	Halmstads BK	6,707	10,752
7	GAIS	6,700	10,226
8	Östers IF	5,636	10,774
9	Landskrona BoIS	5,132	14,693
10	IFK Norrköping	4,933	12,987
11	Örebro SK	4,756	7,136
12	IK Sirius Fotboll	4,292	6,250
13	Åtvidabergs FF	3,860	9,360
14	Brynäs IF	3,603	6,332
