= Sweden men's national football team results (1980–1999) =

- Win Draw Loss

This is a list of Sweden men's national football team results (1980 to 1999).

== 1980s ==
=== 1980 ===
29 April International Friendly	Sweden	1 – 5	Soviet Union	Malmö, Sweden
	Nordgren 24'		Andreyev 7', 25'; Gavrilov 17'; Chelebadze 39' (pen.); Fedorenko 85'	Stadium: Malmö Stadion; Attendance: 10,613; Referee: Clive White (England)

7 May 1978–80 Nordic Football Championship	Sweden	0 – 1	Denmark	Stockholm, Sweden
			Steffensen 13'	Stadium: Ullevi; Attendance: 20,179; Referee: Reidar Bjørnestad (Norway)

22 May 1978–80 Nordic Football Championship	Finland	0 – 2	Sweden	Helsinki, Finland
			Nordgren 6'; Sjöberg 31'	Stadium: Helsinki Olympic Stadium; Attendance: 9,196; Referee: Ib Nielsen (Denmark)

18 June 1982 FIFA World Cup qualification UEFA Group 6	Sweden	1 – 1	Israel	Stockholm, Sweden
	Ramberg 35'		Damti 80'	Stadium: Råsunda Stadium; Attendance: 24,711; Referee: Martti Hirviniemi (Finland)

17 July International Friendly	Sweden	1 – 1	Iceland	Halmstad, Sweden
	Backe 80'		Þorbjörnsson 87'	Stadium: Örjans Vall; Attendance: 10,690; Referee: Torben Månsson (Denmark)

20 August International Friendly	Hungary	2 – 0	Sweden	Budapest, Hungary
	Bild 73' (o.g.); Burcsa 80'			Stadium: Népstadion; Attendance: 18,000; Referee: Erich Linemayr (Austria)

10 September 1982 FIFA World Cup qualification UEFA Group 6	Sweden	0 – 1	Scotland	Stockholm, Sweden
			Strachan 72'	Stadium: Råsunda Stadium; Attendance: 39,831; Referee: Franz Wöhrer (Austria)

24 September International Friendly	Bulgaria	2 – 3	Sweden	Burgas, Bulgaria
	Tsvetkov 32'; Markov 49'		Ramberg 72'; Ohlsson 74'; Holmgren 85'	Stadium: 9 Septemvri Stadium; Attendance: 11,000; Referee: Erkan Göksel (Turkey)

15 October 1982 FIFA World Cup qualification UEFA Group 6	Northern Ireland	3 – 0	Sweden	Belfast, Northern Ireland
	Brotherston 24'; McIlroy 28'; Nicholl 35'			Stadium: Windsor Park; Attendance: 20,000; Referee: Alexis Ponnet (Belgium)

12 November 1982 FIFA World Cup qualification UEFA Group 6	Israel	0 – 0	Sweden	Ramat Gan, Israel
				Stadium: Ramat Gan Stadium; Attendance: 37,654; Referee: George Courtney (England)

=== 1981 ===
28 February Lahti Cup 1981	Norway	2 – 4	Sweden	Lahti, Finland
	Hareide 10'; Davidsen 32'		To. Nilsson 36'; Rönnberg 64'; Larsson 71'; Th. Nilsson 79'	Stadium: Lahden suurhalli Attendance: 1,000; Referee: Taisto Mäkelä (Finland)

1 March Lahti Cup 1981	Finland	2 – 1	Sweden	Lahti, Finland
	Rajaniemi 5'; Ikäläinen 6'		Nilsson 21'	Stadium: Lahden suurhalli Attendance: 1,500; Referee: Mauri Laakso (Finland)

14 May 1981–85 Nordic Football Championship	Sweden	1 – 2	Denmark	Malmö, Sweden
	Börjesson 75'		Bastrup 63'; Elkjær 71'	Stadium: Malmö Stadion; Attendance: 12,07; Referee: Volker Roth (West Germany)

3 June 1982 FIFA World Cup qualification UEFA Group 6	Sweden	1 – 0	Northern Ireland	Stockholm, Sweden
	Borg 48', (red card) 58'		Cochrane (red card) 58'	Stadium: Råsunda Stadium; Attendance: 21,431; Referee: Paolo Bergamo (Italy)

24 June 1982 FIFA World Cup qualification UEFA Group 6	Sweden	3 – 0	Portugal	Stockholm, Sweden
	Börjesson 39'; Hysén 58'; Svensson 73'			Stadium: Råsunda Stadium; Attendance: 34,531; Referee: Anatoliy Milchenko (Soviet Union)

29 July 1981–85 Nordic Football Championship	Sweden	1 – 0	Finland	Halmstad, Sweden
	Björklund 16'			Stadium: Örjans Vall; Attendance: 9,595; Referee: Ole Amundsen (Norway)

12 August International Friendly	Sweden	1 – 0	Bulgaria	Uddevalla, Sweden
	Sjöberg 74'			Stadium: Rimnersvallen; Attendance: 7,561; Referee: Reidar Bjørnestad (Norway)

9 September 1982 FIFA World Cup qualification UEFA Group 6	Scotland	2 – 0	Sweden	Glasgow, Scotland
	Jordan 21'; Robertson 80' (pen.)			Stadium: Hampden Park; Attendance: 81,511; Referee: André Daina (Switzerland)

23 September International Friendly	Greece	2 – 1	Sweden	Thessaloniki, Greece
	Anastopoulos 7'; Kouis 72'		Larsson 76'	Stadium: Kleanthis Vikelidis Stadium; Attendance: 20,000; Referee: Romeo Stincan (Romania)

12 November 1982 FIFA World Cup qualification UEFA Group 6	Portugal	1 – 2	Sweden	Lisbon, Portugal
	Pietra 64'		Larsson 39'; Persson 89'	Stadium: Estádio da Luz; Attendance: 75,000; Referee: Ron Bridges (Wales)

12 November International Friendly	Saudi Arabia	1 – 2	Sweden	Riyadh, Saudi Arabia
	Mosebi 29'		Larsson 23', 83'	Stadium: Prince Faisal bin Fahd Stadium; Attendance: 30,000; Referee: Fahad Al Dahmash (Saudi Arabia)

=== 1982 ===
20 February International Friendly	Finland	2 – 2	Sweden	Lahti, Finland
	Jaakonsaari 31', 75'		Ahlström 9' (pen.), 43' (pen.)	Stadium: Lahden suurhalli Attendance: 1,000; Referee: Reidar Bjørnestad (Norway)

21 February International Friendly	Finland	2 – 1	Sweden	Lahti, Finland
	Jaakonsaari 17'; Ikäläinen 31'		Dahlkvist 69' (pen.)	Stadium: Lahden suurhalli Attendance: 1,500; Referee: Reidar Bjørnestad (Norway)

5 May 1981–85 Nordic Football Championship	Denmark	1 – 1	Sweden	Copenhagen, Denmark
	Arnesen 83'		Larsson 68'	Stadium: Københavns Idrætspark; Attendance: 15,300; Referee: Rolf Nyhus (Norway)

19 May International Friendly	Sweden	2 – 2	East Germany	Halmstad, Sweden
	Persson 61'; Larsson 78'		Jarohs 44'; Dörner 64'	Stadium: Örjans Vall; Attendance: 1,629; Referee: Rolf Haugen (Norway)

3 June International Friendly	Sweden	1 – 1	Soviet Union	Stockholm, Sweden
	Nilsson 85'		Blokhin 50'	Stadium: Råsunda Stadium; Attendance: 12,739; Referee: Torben Månsson (Denmark)

11 August 1981–85 Nordic Football Championship	Norway	1 – 0	Sweden	Oslo, Norway
	Lund 54'			Stadium: Ullevaal Stadion; Attendance: 22,403; Referee: Ole Amundsen (Denmark)

8 September UEFA Euro 1984 qualifying Group 5	Romania	2 – 0	Sweden	Bucharest, Romania
	Andone 25'; Klein 47'			Stadium: Stadionul 23 August; Attendance: 50,000; Referee: Egon Šoštarić (Yugoslavia)

6 October UEFA Euro 1984 qualifying Group 5	Czechoslovakia	2 – 2	Sweden	Bratislava, Czechoslovakia
	Janečka 47', 53'		Jingblad 89'; Eriksson 90'	Stadium: Tehelné pole Attendance: 14,977; Referee: Bob Valentine (Scotland)

13 November UEFA Euro 1984 qualifying Group 5	Cyprus	0 – 1	Sweden	Nicosia, Cyprus
			Corneliusson 34'	Stadium: Makario Stadium; Attendance: 8,000; Referee: Neil Midgley (England)

=== 1983 ===
27 April International Friendly	Netherlands	0 – 3	Sweden	Utrecht, Netherlands
			Corneliusson 12', 68'; Prytz 20' (pen.)	Stadium: Stadion Nieuw Galgenwaard; Attendance: 9,000; Referee: Volker Roth (West Germany)

15 May UEFA Euro 1984 qualifying Group 5	Sweden	5 – 0	Cyprus	Malmö, Sweden
	Prytz 53', 76'; Corneliusson 57'; Hysén 61'; Ravelli 72'			Stadium: Malmö Stadion; Attendance: 19,801; Referee: Juhani Smolander (Finland)

29 May UEFA Euro 1984 qualifying Group 5	Sweden	2 – 0	Italy	Gothenburg, Sweden
	Sandberg 32'; Strömberg 56'			Stadium: Ullevi Stadion; Attendance: 32,860; Referee: Walter Eschweiler (West Germany)

9 June UEFA Euro 1984 qualifying Group 5	Sweden	0 – 1	Romania	Stockholm, Sweden
			Cămătaru 29'	Stadium: Råsunda Stadium; Attendance: 29,522; Referee: Adolf Prokop (East Germany)

22 June International Friendly	Sweden	3 – 3	Brazil	Gothenburg, Sweden
	Corneliusson 14', 33'; Hysén 18'		Rossini 7'; Careca 9'; Jorginho 19'; Éder (red card)	Stadium: Ullevi Stadion; Attendance: 43,172; Referee: Henning Lund-Sørensen (Denmark)

17 August International Friendly	Iceland	0 – 4	Sweden	Reykjavík, Iceland
			Jingblad 4'; Ramberg 19'; Hysén 28'; Fredriksson 82' (pen.)	Stadium: Laugardalsvöllur; Attendance: 2,020; Referee: David Richardson (England)

7 September 1981–85 Nordic Football Championship	Finland	0 – 3	Sweden	Helsinki, Finland
			Eriksson 1', 23'; Sunesson 3'	Stadium: Helsinki Olympic Stadium; Attendance: 8,513; Referee: Erik Steen Jensen (Denmark)

21 September UEFA Euro 1984 qualifying Group 5	Sweden	1 – 0	Czechoslovakia	Stockholm, Sweden
	Corneliusson 13'			Stadium: Råsunda Stadium; Attendance: 20,546; Referee: Michel Vautrot (France)

15 October UEFA Euro 1984 qualifying Group 5	Italy	0 – 3	Sweden	Naples, Italy
			Strömberg 20', 27'; Sunesson 71'	Stadium: Stadio San Paolo; Attendance: 60,086; Referee: García Carrión (Spain)

16 November International Friendly	Trinidad and Tobago	0 – 5	Sweden	Port of Spain, Trinidad and Tobago
			Dahlkvist 14'; Jingblad 48', 54', 88'; Sunesson 77'	Stadium: Queen's Park Oval; Attendance: 7,000; Referee: Trevor Dyer (Trinidad and Tobago)

19 November International Friendly	Barbados	0 – 4	Sweden	Saint Michael, Barbados
			Dahlkvist 23'; Jingblad 75', 80', 85'	Stadium: Barbados National Stadium; Attendance: 4,000; Referee: Frederick Hoyte (Barbados)

22 November International Friendly	Mexico	2 – 0	Sweden	Morelia, Mexico
	Pérez 83'; Serrano 90'		Ravelli (red card) 87'	Stadium: Estadio Venustiano Carranza; Attendance: 22,000; Referee: Jorge Sansone (Mexico)

=== 1984 ===
23 February International Friendly	Sweden	4 – 0	United States	Jönköping, Sweden
	Dahlkvist 25'; Sunesson 75'; Sandberg 83', 88'			Stadium: Tipshallen; Attendance: 3,800; Referee: Ib Nielsen (Denmark)

2 May International Friendly	Switzerland	0 – 0	Sweden	Bern, Switzerland
				Stadium: Wankdorf Stadium; Attendance: 8,500; Referee: Zvi Sharir (Israel)

23 May 1986 FIFA World Cup qualification Group 2	Sweden	4 – 0	Malta	Norrköping, Sweden
	Sunesson 4', 76'; Corneliusson 36'; Erlandsson 70'			Stadium: Norrköpings Idrottspark; Attendance: 18,819; Referee: David Syme (Scotland)

6 June International Friendly	Sweden	0 – 1	Denmark	Gothenburg, Sweden
			Elkjær 45'	Stadium: Ullevi Stadion; Attendance: 24,388; Referee: Einar Halle (Norway)

22 August International Friendly	Sweden	1 – 1	Mexico	Malmö, Sweden
	Prytz 54' (pen.)		Aguirre 52'	Stadium: Malmö Stadion; Attendance: 15,918; Referee: Klaus Scheurell (East Germany)

12 September 1986 FIFA World Cup qualification Group 2	Sweden	0 – 1	Portugal	Stockholm, Sweden
			Gomes 79'	Stadium: Råsunda Stadium; Attendance: 30,136; Referee: Joël Quiniou (France)

26 September International Friendly	Italy	1 – 0	Sweden	Milan, Italy
	Cabrini 2'			Stadium: Stadio Giuseppe Meazza; Attendance: 25,000; Referee: Horst Brummeier (Austria)

17 October 1986 FIFA World Cup qualification Group 2	West Germany	2 – 0	Sweden	Cologne, West Germany
	Rahn 75'; Rummenigge 88'			Stadium: Müngersdorfer Stadion; Attendance: 61,000; Referee: Bob Valentine (Scotland)

14 November 1986 FIFA World Cup qualification Group 2	Portugal	1 – 3	Sweden	Lisbon, Portugal
	Rui Jordão 12'		Prytz 26', 34'; Nilsson 38'	Stadium: Estádio José Alvalade; Attendance: 21,089; Referee: Roger Schoeters (Belgium)

=== 1985 ===
1 May International Friendly	Israel	1 – 1	Sweden	Ramat Gan, Israel
	Ohana 34'		Prytz 31'	Stadium: Ramat Gan Stadium; Attendance: 6,727; Referee: Dan Petrescu (Romania)

22 May International Friendly	Sweden	1 – 0	Norway	Gothenburg, Sweden
	Prytz 86' (pen.)			Stadium: Ullevi Stadion; Attendance: 12,123; Referee: Henning Lund-Sørensen (Denmark)

5 June 1986 FIFA World Cup qualification Group 2	Sweden	2 – 0	Czechoslovakia	Stockholm, Sweden
	Prytz 77' (pen.); Larsson 85'			Stadium: Råsunda Stadium; Attendance: 33,981; Referee: Éamonn Farrell (Republic of Ireland)

21 August International Friendly	Sweden	1 – 0	Poland	Malmö, Sweden
	Ravelli 74'			Stadium: Malmö Stadion; Attendance: 13,000; Referee: Einar Halle (Norway)

11 September International Friendly	Denmark	0 – 3	Sweden	Copenhagen, Denmark
			Prytz 31'; Corneliusson 68'; Magnusson 86'	Stadium: Københavns Idrætspark; Attendance: 44,500; Referee: Rolf Haugen (Norway)

25 September 1986 FIFA World Cup qualification Group 2	Sweden	2 – 2	West Germany	Stockholm, Sweden
	Herget 23'; Völler 40'		Corneliusson 63'; Magnusson 89'	Stadium: Råsunda Stadium; Attendance: 39,157; Referee: Marcel Van Langenhove (Belgium)

16 October 1986 FIFA World Cup qualification Group 2	Czechoslovakia	2 – 1	Sweden	Prague, Czechoslovakia
	Ravelli 41' (o.g.); Vízek 67'		Corneliusson 7'	Stadium: Stadion Evžena Rošického; Attendance: 7,000; Referee: Georges Sandoz (Switzerland)

17 November 1986 FIFA World Cup qualification Group 2	Malta	1 – 2	Sweden	Ta' Qali, Malta
	Farrugia 65'		Prytz 2'; Strömberg 74'	Stadium: National Stadium; Attendance: 6,849; Referee: Yusuf Namoğlu (Turkey)

=== 1986 ===
1 May International Friendly	Sweden	0 – 0	Greece	Malmö, Sweden
	Eriksson (red card) 25'		Manolas (red card) 82'	Stadium: Malmö Stadion; Attendance: 9,944; Referee: Torbjørn Aas (Norway)

14 May International Friendly	Austria	1 – 0	Sweden	Salzburg, Austria
	Kienast 51'			Stadium: Stadion Lehen; Attendance: 12,500; Referee: Henk van Ettekoven (Netherlands)

6 August International Friendly	Finland	1 – 3	Sweden	Helsinki, Finland
	Lipponen 60'		Prytz 23', 36' (pen.); Palmér 34'	Stadium: Helsinki Olympic Stadium; Attendance: 7,040; Referee: Einar Halle (Norway)

20 August International Friendly	Sweden	0 – 0	Soviet Union	Gothenburg, Sweden
				Stadium: Ullevi; Attendance: 13,043; Referee: Jan Damgaard (Denmark)

10 September International Friendly	Sweden	1 – 0	England	Stockholm, Sweden
	Ekström 50'			Stadium: Råsunda Stadium; Attendance: 15,646; Referee: Werner Föckler (West Germany)

25 September UEFA Euro 1988 qualifying Group 2	Sweden	2 – 0	Switzerland	Stockholm, Sweden
	Ekström 19', 79'			Stadium: Råsunda Stadium; Attendance: 26,489; Referee: Vojtech Christov (Czechoslovakia)

12 October UEFA Euro 1988 qualifying Group 2	Portugal	1 – 1	Sweden	Oeiras, Portugal
	Coelho 66'		Strömberg 50'	Stadium: Estádio Nacional; Attendance: 20,000; Referee: Keith Hackett (England)

16 November UEFA Euro 1988 qualifying Group 2	Malta	0 – 5	Sweden	Ta' Qali, Malta
			Hysén 38'; Magnusson 68'; Fredriksson 69'; Ekström 81', 84'	Stadium: National Stadium; Attendance: 9,518; Referee: Lajos Hartmann (Hungary)

=== 1987 ===
18 April International Friendly	Soviet Union	1 – 3	Sweden	Tbilisi, Soviet Union
	Lönn 68' (o.g.)		Limpar 63'; Magnusson 70'	Stadium: Lenin Dinamo Stadium; Attendance: 27,500; Referee: Tadeusz Diakonowicz (Poland)

24 May UEFA Euro 1988 qualifying Group 2	Sweden	1 – 0	Malta	Gothenburg, Sweden
	Ekström 14'			Stadium: Ullevi; Attendance: 16,165; Referee: Kaj Natri (Finland)

3 June UEFA Euro 1988 qualifying Group 2	Sweden	1 – 0	Italy	Stockholm, Sweden
	Larsson 25'			Stadium: Råsunda Stadium; Attendance: 40,070; Referee: Dieter Pauly (West Germany)

21 June UEFA Euro 1988 qualifying Group 2	Switzerland	1 – 1	Sweden	Lausanne, Switzerland
	Halter 58'		Ekström 60'	Stadium: Stade Olympique de la Pontaise; Attendance: 7,000; Referee: Gerard Geurds (Netherlands)

12 August International Friendly	Norway	0 – 0	Sweden	Oslo, Norway
				Stadium: Ullevaal Stadion; Attendance: 22,237; Referee: Esa Palsi (Finland)

26 August International Friendly	Sweden	1 – 0	Denmark	Stockholm, Sweden
	Magnusson 88'			Stadium: Råsunda Stadium; Attendance: 15,637; Referee: Georges Sandoz (Switzerland)

23 September UEFA Euro 1988 qualifying Group 2	Sweden	0 – 1	Portugal	Stockholm, Sweden
			Gomes 34'	Stadium: Råsunda Stadium; Attendance: 28,916; Referee: Valeri Butenko (Soviet Union)

14 October International Friendly	West Germany	1 – 1	Sweden	Gelsenkirchen, West Germany
	Hysén 62'		Littbarski 17'	Stadium: Parkstadion; Attendance: 31,000; Referee: Victoriano Sánchez Arminio (Spain)

14 November UEFA Euro 1988 qualifying Group 2	Italy	2 – 1	Sweden	Naples, Italy
	Vialli 27', 45'		Larsson 38'	Stadium: Stadio San Paolo; Attendance: 59,046; Referee: Adolf Prokop (East Germany)

=== 1988 ===
12 January 1988 Maspalomas Tournament; Semi-final	East Germany	1 – 4	Sweden	Maspalomas, Spain
	Thom 41'		Truedsson 12'; Thern 54', 76'; Rehn 58'	Stadium: Estadio Municipal; Attendance: 4,500; Referee: Fernando Saavedra (Spain)

15 January 1988 Maspalomas Tournament; Final	Finland	0 – 1	Sweden	Maspalomas, Spain
	Rantanen (red card)		Thern 31'	Stadium: Estadio Municipal; Attendance: 4,129; Referee: Tomás Jiménez Moreno (Spain)

31 March 1988 Four Nations Tournament; Semi-final	West Germany	1 – 1 (aet); 2 - 4(p.)	Sweden	Berlin, West Germany
	Allofs 42'		Truedsson 74'	Stadium: Olympiastadion; Attendance: 23,709; Referee: Lajos Hartmann (Hungary)
	Penalties
	Thon (penalty scored); Eckstein (penalty scored); Matthäus (penalty missed); Völler (penalty missed)		(penalty scored) Prytz; (penalty scored) Larsson; (penalty scored) Strömberg; (penalty scored) Thern

2 April 1988 Four Nations Tournament; Final	Sweden	2 – 0	Soviet Union	Berlin, West Germany
	Eskilsson 52'; Holmqvist 88'			Stadium: Olympiastadion; Attendance: 25,000; Referee: Marcel Van Langenhove (Belgium)

27 April International Friendly	Sweden	4 – 1	Wales	Stockholm, Sweden
	Holmqvist 17', 55'; Strömberg 25'; Eskilsson 66'		Hodges 27'	Stadium: Råsunda Stadium; Attendance: 11,656; Referee: Gerald Losert (Austria)

1 June International Friendly	Spain	1 – 3	Sweden	Villares de la Reina, Spain
	Butragueño 14'		Nilsson 22'; Hysén 43'; Magnusson 48'	Stadium: Helmántico Stadium; Attendance: 25,000; Referee: Joe Worrall (England)

31 August International Friendly	Sweden	1 – 2	Denmark	Stockholm, Sweden
	Pettersson 82'		Elstrup 29', 64'	Stadium: Råsunda Stadium; Attendance: 20,528; Referee: Esa Palsi (Finland)

12 October International Friendly	Sweden	0 – 0	Portugal	Gothenburg, Sweden
				Stadium: Ullevi; Attendance: 10,092; Referee: Egil Nervik (Norway)

19 October 1990 FIFA World Cup qualification Group 2	England	0 – 0	Sweden	London, England
				Stadium: Wembley Stadium; Attendance: 65,628; Referee: Gérard Biguet (France)

5 November 1990 FIFA World Cup qualification Group 2	Albania	1 – 2	Sweden	Tirana, Albania
	Shehu 33'		Holmquist 68'; Ekström 71'	Stadium: Qemal Stafa Stadium; Attendance: 20,000; Referee: Yusuf Namoğlu (Turkey)

=== 1989 ===
26 April International Friendly	Wales	0 – 2	Sweden	Wrexham, Wales
			Schiller 30'; Ratcliffe 56' (o.g.)	Stadium: Racecourse Ground; Attendance: 7,292; Referee: John Purcell (Republic of Ireland)

7 May 1990 FIFA World Cup qualification Group 2	Sweden	2 – 1	Poland	Stockholm, Sweden
	Ljung 77'; Larsson 90'		Tarasiewicz 87'	Stadium: Råsunda Stadium; Attendance: 35,032; Referee: Kurt Röthlisberger (Switzerland)

31 May International Friendly	Sweden	2 – 0	Algeria	Örebro, Sweden
	Ingesson 33', 70'			Stadium: Eyravallen; Attendance: 7,500; Referee: Kim Milton Nielsen (Denmark)

14 June Dansk Boldspil Union 100th Anniversary Tournament	Denmark	6 – 0	Sweden	Copenhagen, Denmark
	Povlsen 30'; Elstrup 42', 73'; Andersen 63'; Bartram 69'; Laudrup 79'			Stadium: Københavns Idrætspark; Attendance: 15,200; Referee: Dieter Pauly (West Germany)

16 June Dansk Boldspil Union 100th Anniversary Tournament	Brazil	1 – 2	Sweden	Copenhagen, Denmark
	Cristóvão 79'		Rehn 26'; Ljung 48' (pen.)	Stadium: Københavns Idrætspark; Attendance: 6,700; Referee: Henning Lund-Sørensen (Denmark)

16 August International Friendly	Sweden	2 – 4	France	Malmö, Sweden
	Thern 5'; Lindqvist 63'		Cantona 57', 87'; Papin 61', 83'	Stadium: Malmö Stadion; Attendance: 16,619; Referee: Zvi Sharir (Israel)

6 September 1990 FIFA World Cup qualification Group 2	Sweden	0 – 0	England	Stockholm, Sweden
				Stadium: Råsunda Stadium; Attendance: 38,588; Referee: Hubert Forstinger (Austria)

8 October 1990 FIFA World Cup qualification Group 2	Sweden	3 – 1	Albania	Stockholm, Sweden
	Magnusson 20'; Ingesson 55'; Engqvist 89'		Kushta 8' (pen.)	Stadium: Råsunda Stadium; Attendance: 32,423; Referee: Alder Santos (Portugal)

25 October 1990 FIFA World Cup qualification Group 2	Poland	0 – 2	Sweden	Chorzów, Poland
			Larsson 35' (pen.); Ekström 60'	Stadium: Stadion Śląski; Attendance: 12,000; Referee: Wieland Ziller (East Germany)

== 1990s ==
=== 1990 ===
14 February International Friendly	United Arab Emirates	2 – 1	Sweden	Dubai, UAE
	Al Talyani 64'; Bakheet 74'		Schwarz 82'	Stadium: Al-Maktoum Stadium; Attendance: 4,000; Referee: Mohamed Al Mulla (UAE)

17 February International Friendly	United Arab Emirates	0 – 2	Sweden	Dubai, UAE
			Rehn 25'; Ingesson 83'	Stadium: Al-Maktoum Stadium; Attendance: 4,200; Referee: Ali Bujsaim (UAE)

21 February International Friendly	Belgium	0 – 0	Sweden	Brussels, Belgium
				Stadium: Heysel Stadium; Attendance: 3,537; Referee: Friedrich Kaupe (Austria)

11 April International Friendly	Algeria	1 – 1	Sweden	Algiers, Algeria
	Serrar 14' (pen.)		Schwarz 48'	Stadium: July 5, 1962 Stadium; Attendance: 300; Referee: Rachid Medjiba (Algeria)

25 April International Friendly	Sweden	4 – 2	Wales	Stockholm, Sweden
	Saunders 13', 64'		Brolin 20', 25'; Ingesson 53', 72'	Stadium: Råsunda; Attendance: 13,981; Referee: Simo Ruokonen (Finland)

27 May International Friendly	Sweden	6 – 0	Finland	Solna, Sweden
	Magnusson 5'; Limpar 56'; Brolin 58', 59'; Larsson 66'; Thern 74'			Stadium: Råsunda Stadium; Attendance: 12,914; Referee: Thorodd Presberg (Norway)

10 June 1990 FIFA World Cup; Group C	Brazil	2 – 1	Sweden	Turin, Italy
	Careca 41', 62'		Brolin 78'	Stadium: Stadio delle Alpi; Attendance: 62,628; Referee: Tullio Lanese (Italy)

16 June 1990 FIFA World Cup; Group C	Sweden	1 – 2	Scotland	Genoa, Italy
	Strömberg 85'		McCall 11'; Johnston 81'	Stadium: Stadio Luigi Ferraris; Attendance: 31,823; Referee: Carlos Maciel (Paraguay)

20 June 1990 FIFA World Cup; Group C	Sweden	1 – 2	Costa Rica	Genoa, Italy
	Ekström 32'		Flores 74'; Medford 81'	Stadium: Stadio Luigi Ferraris; Attendance: 30,223; Referee: Zoran Petrović (Serbia)

22 August International Friendly	Norway	1 – 2	Sweden	Stavanger, Norway
	Ahlsen 2'		Engqvist 40'; Fjellström 74'	Stadium: Stavanger Stadion; Attendance: 10,065; Referee: Kim Milton Nielsen (Denmark)

5 September International Friendly	Sweden	0 – 1	Denmark	Västerås, Sweden
			Christensen 84'	Stadium: Arosvallen; Attendance: 9,034; Referee: Douglas Hope (Scotland)

26 September International Friendly	Sweden	2 – 0	Bulgaria	Stockholm, Sweden
	Corneliusson 64'; Andersson 73'			Stadium: Råsunda; Attendance: 6,954; Referee: Jan Damgaard (Denmark)

10 October International Friendly	Sweden	1 – 3	Germany	Stockholm, Sweden
	Rehn 70'		Klinsmann 29'; Völler 39'; Brehme 44'	Stadium: Råsunda; Attendance: 20,396; Referee: Joe Worrall (England)

=== 1991 ===
17 April International Friendly	Greece	2 – 2	Sweden	Athens, Greece
	Vonderburg 11' (o.g.); Borbokis 83'		Erlingmark 41'; Mild 61'	Stadium: Neas Philadelphias; Attendance: 3,900; Referee: Pierluigi Magni (Italy)

1 May International Friendly	Sweden	6 – 0	Austria	Stockholm, Sweden
	Andersson 12', 34', 87'; Rehn 38'; Dahlin 41', 59'			Stadium: Råsunda; Attendance: 3,689; Referee: Rune Pedersen (Norway)

5 June International Friendly	Sweden	2 – 2	Colombia	Stockholm, Sweden
	Brolin 33'; Andersson 73'		Rincón 62'; Iguarán 71'	Stadium: Råsunda; Attendance: 12,261; Referee: Simo Ruokonen (Finland)

13 June Scania 100 Tournament; First Round	Sweden	2 – 3 (a.e.t.)	Soviet Union	Gothenburg, Sweden
	Brolin 4', 114'		Yuran 69'; Kuznetsov 94'; Korneev 117'	Stadium: Ullevi; Attendance: 14,225; Referee: Peter Mikkelsen (Denmark)

15 June Scania 100 Tournament; Third Place	Sweden	4 – 0	Denmark	Norrköping, Sweden
	Dahlin 42', 53'; Andersson 60' (pen.); Brolin 68'			Stadium: Norrköpings Idrottspark; Attendance: 7,849; Referee: Aron Schmidhuber (Germany)

8 August International Friendly	Norway	1 – 2	Sweden	Oslo, Norway
	Leonhardsen 12'		Brolin 14'; Limpar 40'	Stadium: Ullevaal Stadion; Attendance: 9,842; Referee: Hans-Peter Dellwing (Germany)

21 August International Friendly	Poland	2 – 0	Sweden	Gdynia, Poland
	Kowalczyk 59'; Trzeciak 90'			Stadium: Stadion Miejski; Attendance: 6,000; Referee: Frans van den Wijngaert (Netherlands)

4 September International Friendly	Sweden	4 – 3	Yugoslavia	Stockholm, Sweden
	Dahlin 20', 69'; Limpar 51'; Thern 84'		Savićević 33', 66'; Larsson 75' (o.g.)	Stadium: Råsunda; Attendance: 11,510; Referee: Alain Delmer (France)

9 October International Friendly	Switzerland	3 – 1	Sweden	Lucerne, Switzerland
	Chapuisat 11'; Herr 44'; Türkyilmaz 52'		Eriksson 89'	Stadium: Stadion Allmend; Attendance: 7,300; Referee: Claude Bouillet (France)

=== 1992 ===
26 January International Friendly	Australia	0 – 0	Sweden	Sydney, Australia
				Stadium: Sydney Football Stadium; Attendance: 13,456; Referee: Gary Power (Australia)

29 January International Friendly	Australia	1 – 0	Sweden	Adelaide, Australia
	Edwards 77'			Stadium: Hindmarsh Stadium; Attendance: 9,301; Referee: Tom McRoe (Australia)

2 February International Friendly	Australia	1 – 0	Sweden	Melbourne, Australia
	Wade 66'			Stadium: Olympic Park Stadium; Attendance: 10,800; Referee: John Frazer (Australia)

22 April International Friendly	Tunisia	0 – 1	Sweden	Tunis, Tunisia
			Andersson 63'	Stadium: Stade El Menzah; Attendance: 29,785; Referee: Rachid Medjiba (Algeria)

7 May International Friendly	Sweden	5 – 0	Poland	Stockholm, Sweden
	Andersson 10', 25'; Ingesson 44'; Dahlin 62'; Pettersson 70'			Stadium: Råsunda; Attendance: 9,425; Referee: Jaap Uilenberg (Netherlands)

27 May International Friendly	Sweden	2 – 1	Hungary	Stockholm, Sweden
	Schwarz 31', 39'		Márton 63'	Stadium: Råsunda; Attendance: 8,169; Referee: Kaj Natri (Finland)

7 June UEFA Euro 1992; Group 1	Sweden	1 – 1	France	Stockholm, Sweden
	Eriksson 25'		Papin 59'	Stadium: Råsunda; Attendance: 29,860; Referee: Alexey Spirin (CIS)

14 June UEFA Euro 1992; Group 1	Sweden	1 – 0	Denmark	Stockholm, Sweden
	Brolin 59'			Stadium: Råsunda; Attendance: 29,902; Referee: Aron Schmidhuber (Germany)

17 June UEFA Euro 1992; Group 1	Sweden	2 – 1	England	Stockholm, Sweden
	Eriksson 51'; Brolin 82'		Platt 4'	Stadium: Råsunda; Attendance: 30,126; Referee: José Rosa dos Santos (Portugal)

21 June UEFA Euro 1992; Semi final	Sweden	2 – 3	Germany	Stockholm, Sweden
	Brolin 64'; Andersson 89'		Häßler 11'; Riedle 59', 88'	Stadium: Råsunda; Attendance: 28,827; Referee: Tullio Lanese (Italy)

26 August Norwegian Football 90th Anniversary Tournament	Norway	2 – 2	Sweden	Oslo, Norway
	Leonhardsen 18'; Nilsen 88'		Dahlin 30'; Pettersson 63'	Stadium: Ullevaal Stadion; Attendance: 8,420; Referee: Kaj Østergaard (Norway)

9 September 1994 FIFA World Cup qualification Group 6	Finland	0 – 1	Sweden	Helsinki, Finland
			Ingesson 75'	Stadium: Helsinki Olympic Stadium; Attendance: 13,617; Referee: Vadim Zhuk (Belarus)

7 October 1994 FIFA World Cup qualification Group 6	Sweden	2 – 0	Bulgaria	Stockholm, Sweden
	Dahlin 56'; Pettersson 76'			Stadium: Råsunda; Attendance: 20,625; Referee: John Blankenstein (Netherlands)

11 November 1994 FIFA World Cup qualification Group 6	Israel	1 – 3	Sweden	Ramat Gan, Israel
	Banin 42'		Limpar 37'; Dahlin 58'; Ingesson 75'	Stadium: Ramat Gan Stadium; Attendance: 25,230; Referee: Serge Muhmenthaler (Switzerland)

=== 1993 ===
15 April International Friendly	Hungary	0 – 2	Sweden	Budapest, Hungary
			Ekström 66'; Rehn 89'	Stadium: Nepstadion; Attendance: 3,000; Referee: Bülent Yavuz (Turkey)

28 April 1994 FIFA World Cup qualification Group 6	France	2 – 1	Sweden	Paris, France
	Cantona 43', 82'		Dahlin 14'	Stadium: Parc des Princes; Attendance: 34,134; Referee: Pierluigi Pairetto (Italy)

19 May 1994 FIFA World Cup qualification Group 6	Sweden	1 – 0	Austria	Stockholm, Sweden
	Eriksson 50'			Stadium: Råsunda; Attendance: 27,775; Referee: Michel Piraux (Belgium)

2 June 1994 FIFA World Cup qualification Group 6	Sweden	5 – 0	Israel	Stockholm, Sweden
	Brolin 16', 41', 66'; Zetterberg 55'; Landberg 89'		Hilel (yellow card) 8' (red card) 31'	Stadium: Råsunda; Attendance: 22,042; Referee: Sergey Husainov (Russia)

11 August International Friendly	Sweden	1 – 2	Switzerland	Borås, Sweden
	Dahlin 17'		Knup 19'; Herr 74'	Stadium: Ryavallen; Attendance: 14,712; Referee: Angelo Amendolia (Italy)

22 August 1994 FIFA World Cup qualification Group 6	Sweden	1 – 1	France	Stockholm, Sweden
	Dahlin 88'		Sauzée 76'	Stadium: Råsunda; Attendance: 30,530; Referee: Aron Schmidhuber (Germany)

8 September 1994 FIFA World Cup qualification Group 6	Bulgaria	1 – 1	Sweden	Sofia, Bulgaria
	Stoichkov 22'		Dahlin 26'	Stadium: Vasil Levski National Stadium; Attendance: 35,000; Referee: Ryszard Wójcik (Poland)

13 October 1994 FIFA World Cup qualification Group 6	Sweden	3 – 2	Finland	Stockholm, Sweden
	Dahlin 27', 45'; Larsson 40'		Suominen 15'; Litmanen 60'	Stadium: Råsunda; Attendance: 30,177; Referee: Ahmet Çakar (Turkey)

10 November 1994 FIFA World Cup qualification Group 6	Austria	1 – 1	Sweden	Vienna, Austria
	Herzog 70'		Mild 67'	Stadium: Ernst-Happel-Stadion; Attendance: 25,000; Referee: Manuel Díaz Vega (Spain)

=== 1994 ===
18 February Joe Robbie Cup	Colombia	0 – 0	Sweden	Miami, USA
	Valderrama (yellow card) 45' (red card)		Björklund (yellow card) 83' (red card)	Stadium: Miami Orange Bowl; Attendance: 15,676; Referee: Hélder Dias (USA)

20 February Joe Robbie Cup	United States	1 – 3	Sweden	Miami, USA
	Pérez 4'		Larsson 30'; Andersson 34'; Lilienberg 56'	Stadium: Miami Orange Bowl; Attendance: 20,171; Referee: Antonio Marrufo Mendoza (Mexico)

24 February International Friendly	Mexico	2 – 1	Sweden	Fresno, USA
	Hernández 33'; Rodríguez 57'; Hermosillo (yellow card) 44' (red card)		Mild 81'	Stadium: Bulldog Stadium; Attendance: 21,172; Referee: Brian Hall (USA)

20 April International Friendly	Wales	0 – 2	Sweden	Wrexham, Wales
			Larsson 84'; Brolin 90'	Stadium: Racecourse Ground; Attendance: 4,694; Referee: Brendan Shorte (Republic of Ireland)

5 May International Friendly	Sweden	3 – 1	Nigeria	Stockholm, Sweden
	Schwarz 2'; Larsson 42'; Ingesson 77'		Odegbami 75'	Stadium: Råsunda; Attendance: 14,712; Referee: Pat Kelly (Northern Ireland)

26 May International Friendly	Denmark	1 – 0	Sweden	Copenhagen, Denmark
	M. Laudrup 54'			Stadium: Parken Stadium; Attendance: 28,689; Referee: Rune Pedersen (Norway)

5 June International Friendly	Sweden	2 – 0	Norway	Stockholm, Sweden
	Brolin 56', 61'			Stadium: Råsunda; Attendance: 29,691; Referee: Kim Milton Nielsen (Denmark)

12 June International Friendly	Romania	1 – 1	Sweden	Mission Viejo, USA
	Hagi 74'		Ingesson 56'	Stadium: Trabuco Hills High School; Attendance: 5,569; Referee: Joshua Patlak (USA)

19 June 1994 World Cup; Group B	Sweden	2 – 2	Cameroon	Pasadena, USA
	Ljung 8'; Dahlin 74'		Embé 31'; Omam-Biyik 47'	Stadium: Rose Bowl; Attendance: 93,194; Referee: Alberto Tejada (Peru)

24 June 1994 World Cup; Group B	Sweden	3 – 1	Russia	Pontiac, USA
	Brolin 37'; Dahlin 59', 81'		Salenko 9'	Stadium: Silverdome; Attendance: 71,528; Referee: Alberto Tejada (Peru)

28 June 1994 World Cup; Group B	Sweden	1 – 1	Brazil	Pontiac, USA
	Andersson 23'		Romario 46'	Stadium: Silverdome; Attendance: 77,217; Referee: Sándor Puhl (Hungary)

3 July 1994 World Cup; Round of 16	Sweden	3 – 1	Saudi Arabia	Dallas, USA
	Dahlin 6'; Andersson 51', 88'		Al-Ghesheyan 85'	Stadium: Cotton Bowl; Attendance: 60,277; Referee: Renato Marsiglia (Brazil)

10 July 1994 World Cup; Quarter final	Sweden	2 – 2 (a.e.t.) (5 – 4 p)	Romania	Stanford, USA
	Brolin 78'; Andersson 115'; Schwarz (yellow card) 43' (yellow-red card) 101'		Răducioiu 88', 101'	Stadium: Stanford Stadium; Attendance: 83,500; Referee: Philip Don (England)
	Penalties
	Mild (penalty missed); Andersson (penalty scored); Brolin (penalty scored); Ingesson (penalty scored); Nilsson (penalty scored); Larsson (penalty scored)		(penalty scored) Răducioiu; (penalty scored) Hagi; (penalty scored) Lupescu; (penalty missed) Petrescu; (penalty scored) Dumitrescu; (penalty missed) Belodedici

13 July 1994 World Cup; Semi final	Sweden	0 – 1	Brazil	Pasadena, USA
			Romario 80'	Stadium: Rose Bowl; Attendance: 91,856; Referee: José Torres Cadena (Colombia)

16 July 1994 World Cup; Third place play-off	Sweden	4 – 0	Bulgaria	Pasadena, USA
	Brolin 8'; Mild 30'; Larsson 37'; Andersson 40'			Stadium: Rose Bowl; Attendance: 83,716; Referee: Ali Bujsaim (UAE)

17 August International Friendly	Sweden	4 – 2	Lithuania	Örebro, Sweden
	Brolin 21', 28'; P. Andersson 38'; Larsson 72'			Stadium: Eyravallen; Attendance: 11,260; Referee: William Young (Scotland)

7 September UEFA Euro 1996 qualifying Group 3	Iceland	0 – 1	Sweden	Reykjavík, Iceland
			Ingesson 37'	Stadium: Laugardalsvöllur; Attendance: 14,631; Referee: Leslie Mottram (Scotland)

12 October UEFA Euro 1996 qualifying Group 3	Switzerland	4 – 2	Sweden	Bern, Switzerland
	Ohrel 36'; Blomqvist 63' (o.g.); Sforza 79'; Türkyilmaz 80'		K. Andersson 5'; Dahlin 61'	Stadium: Wankdorf Stadium; Attendance: 24,000; Referee: David Elleray (England)

16 November UEFA Euro 1996 qualifying Group 3	Sweden	2 – 0	Hungary	Stockholm, Sweden
	Brolin 43'; Dahlin 70'			Stadium: Råsunda; Attendance: 27,571; Referee: Mario van der Ende (Netherlands)

=== 1995 ===
8 March International Friendly	Cyprus	3 – 3	Sweden	Limassol, Cyprus
	Agathokleous 3'; Hadjiloukas 5'; Engomitis 85'		Ekström 17'; Andersson 45'; Alexandersson 46'	Stadium: Tsirio Stadium; Attendance: 500; Referee: Anastasios Papaioannou (Cyprus)

29 March UEFA Euro 1996 qualifying Group 3	Turkey	2 – 1	Sweden	Istanbul, Turkey
	Aşık 64'; Yalçın 75'		Andersson 23'; Björklund (red card) 76'	Stadium: İnönü Stadium; Attendance: 20,000; Referee: Alfredo Trentalange (Italy)

26 April UEFA Euro 1996 qualifying Group 3	Hungary	1 – 0	Sweden	Budapest, Hungary
	Halmai 2'			Stadium: Nepstadion; Attendance: 8,300; Referee: Antonio Jesús López Nieto (Spain)

1 June UEFA Euro 1996 qualifying Group 3	Sweden	1 – 1	Iceland	Stockholm, Sweden
	Brolin 17'		A. Gunnlaugsson 3'	Stadium: Råsunda; Attendance: 25,676; Referee: Atanas Uzunov (Bulgaria)

4 June Umbro Cup	Brazil	1 – 0	Sweden	Birmingham, England
	Edmundo 43'			Stadium: Villa Park; Attendance: 20,131; Referee: Dick Jol (Netherlands)

8 June Umbro Cup	England	3 – 3	Sweden	Leeds, England
	Sheringham 44'; Platt 89'; Anderton 90'		Mild 11', 37'; Andersson 46'	Stadium: Elland Road; Attendance: 32,008; Referee: Leslie Mottram (Scotland)

10 June Umbro Cup	Japan	2 – 2	Sweden	Nottingham, England
	Fujita 9'; Kurosaki 85'		Andersson 53', 69'	Stadium: City Ground; Attendance: 5,591; Referee: Angelo Amendolia (Italy)

16 August International Friendly	Sweden	1 – 0	United States	Norrköping, Sweden
	Brolin 86'			Stadium: Norrköpings Idrottspark; Attendance: 14,249; Referee: Roy Helge Olsen (Norway)

6 September UEFA Euro 1996 qualifying Group 3	Sweden	0 – 0	Switzerland	Gothenburg, Sweden
				Stadium: Ullevi; Attendance: 40,505; Referee: Piero Ceccarini (Italy)

11 October International Friendly	Sweden	2 – 0	Scotland	Stockholm, Sweden
	Pettersson 31'; Schwarz 36'			Stadium: Råsunda; Attendance: 19,121; Referee: Manuel Díaz Vega (Spain)

15 November UEFA Euro 1996 qualifying Group 3	Sweden	2 – 2	Turkey	Stockholm, Sweden
	Alexandersson 25'; Pettersson 64'		Şükür 62'; Pettersson 73' (o.g.)	Stadium: Råsunda; Attendance: 16,350; Referee: Ryszard Wójcik (Poland)

=== 1996 ===
22 February 1996 Lunar New Year Cup	Japan	1 – 1 (a.e.t.) (4 – 5 p)	Sweden	So Kon Po, Hong Kong
	Omura 65'		Pringle 52'	Stadium: Hong Kong Stadium; Attendance: 31,932; Referee: Peter Mikkelsen (Denmark)
	Penalties
	Miura (penalty scored); Sōma (penalty scored); Takagi (penalty missed); Honda (penalty scored); Ihara (penalty scored)		(penalty scored) Landberg; (penalty scored) Karlsson; (penalty scored) Nilsson; (penalty scored) Nilsson; (penalty scored) Alexandersson

25 February International Friendly	Australia	0 – 2	Sweden	Brisbane, Australia
			Andr. Andersson 85', 88'	Stadium: Suncorp Stadium; Attendance: 10,081; Referee: Eugene Brazzale (Australia)

28 February International Friendly	Australia	0 – 0	Sweden	Sydney, Australia
				Stadium: Sydney Football Stadium; Attendance: 13,905; Referee: Eddie Lennie (Australia)

24 April International Friendly	Northern Ireland	1 – 2	Sweden	Belfast, Northern Ireland
	McMahon 84'		Dahlin 22'; Ingesson 58'	Stadium: Windsor Park; Attendance: 5,666; Referee: Hugh Dallas (Scotland)

9 May International Friendly	Sweden	2 – 1	Slovakia	Helsingborg, Sweden
	Dahlin 51'; Zeman 85' (o.g.)		Zeman 65'	Stadium: Olympia; Attendance: 10,798; Referee: David Elleray (England)

16 May International Friendly	South Korea	0 – 2	Sweden	Seoul, South Korea
			Dahlin 13'; Limpar 59'	Stadium: Olympic Stadium; Attendance: 76,894; Referee: Pirom Un-prasert (Thailand)

1 June 1998 FIFA World Cup qualification Group 4	Sweden	5 – 1	Belarus	Stockholm, Sweden
	K. Andersson 20', 62'; Dahlin 30'; P. Andersson 77'; Larsson 88'		Byalkevich 75'	Stadium: Råsunda; Attendance: 30,014; Referee: Rémi Harrel (France)

14 August International Friendly	Sweden	0 – 1	Denmark	Gothenburg, Sweden
			Bjur 27'	Stadium: Ullevi; Attendance: 21,350; Referee: Ľuboš Micheľ (Slovakia)

1 September 1998 FIFA World Cup qualification Group 4	Latvia	1 – 2	Sweden	Riga, Latvia
	Rimkus 57'		Dahlin 16'; K. Andersson 20'	Stadium: Daugava Stadium; Attendance: 8,500; Referee: László Vágner (Hungary)

9 October 1998 FIFA World Cup qualification Group 4	Sweden	0 – 1	Austria	Stockholm, Sweden
			Herzog 12'	Stadium: Råsunda; Attendance: 36,859; Referee: Václav Krondl (Czech Republic)

10 November 1998 FIFA World Cup qualification Group 4	Scotland	1 – 0	Sweden	Glasgow, Scotland
	McGinlay 9'			Stadium: Ibrox Stadium; Attendance: 46,738; Referee: José María García-Aranda (Spain)

=== 1997 ===
9 February 1997 King's Cup; Group Stage	Romania	0 – 2	Sweden	Bangkok, Thailand
			Andr. Andersson 8'; Matovac 77'	Stadium: National Stadium; Attendance: 20,000; Referee: Pirom Un-prasert (Thailand)

11 February 1997 King's Cup; Group Stage	Thailand	0 – 0	Sweden	Bangkok, Thailand
				Stadium: National Stadium; Attendance: 25,000; Referee: Nik Ahmad Yaakub (Malaysia)

13 February 1997 King's Cup; Group Stage	Japan	0 – 1	Sweden	Bangkok, Thailand
			Anders Andersson 14'	Stadium: National Stadium; Attendance: 20,000; Referee: Eddie Lennie (Australia)

16 February 1997 King's Cup; Final	Thailand	1 – 3	Sweden	Bangkok, Thailand
	Pobprasert 89'		Sundgren 68'; Persson 82'; Steiner 90'	Stadium: National Stadium; Attendance: 30,000; Referee: Mohamed Nazri Abdullah (Malaysia)

9 May International Friendly	Sweden	2 – 1	Slovakia	Helsingborg, Sweden
	Dahlin 51'; Zeman 85' (o.g.)		Zeman 65'	Stadium: Olympia; Attendance: 10,798; Referee: David Elleray (England)

12 March International Friendly	Israel	0 – 1	Sweden	Ramat Gan, Israel
			Andr. Andersson 68'	Stadium: Ramat Gan Stadium; Attendance: 18,000; Referee: Hartmut Strampe (Germany)

2 April International Friendly	France	1 – 0	Sweden	Paris, France
	Djorkaeff 45'			Stadium: Parc des Princes; Attendance: 34,514; Referee: Marnix Sandra (Belgium)

30 April 1998 FIFA World Cup qualification Group 4	Sweden	2 – 1	Scotland	Gothenburg, Sweden
	K. Andersson 43', 63'		Gallacher 83'	Stadium: Ullevi; Attendance: 40,302; Referee: Pierluigi Collina (Italy)

22 May International Friendly	Sweden	2 – 2	Poland	Stockholm, Sweden
	Zetterberg 15', 32' (pen.)		Bukalski 69'; Kałużny 87'	Stadium: Råsunda; Attendance: 40,302; Referee: Kenny Clark (Scotland)

8 June 1998 FIFA World Cup qualification Group 4	Estonia	2 – 3	Sweden	Tallinn, Estonia
	Oper 74'; Kristal 84'		Dahlin 13'; Zetterberg 53'; K. Andersson 71'	Stadium: Kadriorg Stadium; Attendance: 3,000; Referee: Ryszard Wójcik (Poland)

6 August International Friendly	Sweden	1 – 0	Lithuania	Malmö, Sweden
	Dahlin 33'			Stadium: Malmö Stadion; Attendance: 15,043; Referee: Lutz Fröhlich (Germany)

20 August 1998 FIFA World Cup qualification Group 4	Belarus	1 – 2	Sweden	Minsk, Belarus
	Gurenko 38'; Romasjtjenko (yellow card) 68' (red card) 84'		K. Andersson 76'; Zetterberg 85'	Stadium: Dinamo Stadium; Attendance: 10,000; Referee: Dermot Gallagher (England)

6 September 1998 FIFA World Cup qualification Group 4	Austria	1 – 0	Sweden	Vienna, Austria
	Herzog 76'; Pfeffer (yellow card) 31' (red card) 41'; Konsel (red card) 82'		Nilsson (red card) 69'	Stadium: Ernst-Happel-Stadion; Attendance: 48,500; Referee: Antonio Jesús López Nieto (Spain)

10 September 1998 FIFA World Cup qualification Group 4	Sweden	1 – 0	Latvia	Stockholm, Sweden
	Jonson 88'			Stadium: Råsunda; Attendance: 48,500; Referee: Antonio Jesús López Nieto (Spain)

11 October 1998 FIFA World Cup qualification Group 4	Sweden	1 – 0	Estonia	Stockholm, Sweden
	Zetterberg 25'			Stadium: Råsunda; Attendance: 18,702; Referee: Stefan Ormandijev (Bulgaria)

=== 1998 ===
24 January International Friendly	United States	1 – 0	Sweden	Orlando, Florida, USA
	Wegerle 2'			Stadium: Citrus Bowl Stadium; Attendance: 12,773; Referee: Rich Grady (USA)

29 January International Friendly	Jamaica	0 – 0	Sweden	Kingston, Jamaica
				Stadium: National Stadium; Attendance: 20,000; Referee: Ramesh Ramdhan (Trinidad and Tobago)

25 March International Friendly	Spain	4 – 0	Sweden	Vigo, Spain
	Morientes 1', 6'; Raúl 31'; Etxeberria 71'			Stadium: Balaídos; Attendance: 20,000; Referee: Georg Dardenne (Germany)

22 April International Friendly	Sweden	0 – 0	France	Stockholm, Sweden
				Stadium: Råsunda; Attendance: 14,018; Referee: Graham Poll (England)

28 May International Friendly	Sweden	3 – 0	Denmark	Malmö, Sweden
	Ljungberg 22'; Pettersson 33', 50'			Stadium: Malmö Stadion; Attendance: 25,258; Referee: René Temmink (Netherlands)

2 June International Friendly	Sweden	1 – 0	Italy	Gothenburg, Sweden
	K. Andersson 90'			Stadium: Ullevi; Attendance: 25,553; Referee: Terje Hauge (Norway)

19 August International Friendly	Sweden	1 – 0	Russia	Örebro, Sweden
	Pettersson 3'			Stadium: Eyravallen; Attendance: 8,118; Referee: Luc Huyghe (Belgium)

5 September UEFA Euro 2000 qualifying Group 5	Sweden	2 – 1	England	Stockholm, Sweden
	A. Andersson 31'; Mjällby 33'		Shearer 2'	Stadium: Råsunda; Attendance: 35,394; Referee: Pierluigi Collina (Italy)

14 October UEFA Euro 2000 qualifying Group 5	Bulgaria	0 – 1	Sweden	Burgas, Bulgaria
			Larsson 62'	Stadium: Neftochimik Stadium; Attendance: 12,000; Referee: Bernd Heynemann (Germany)

=== 1999 ===
10 February International Friendly	Tunisia	0 – 1	Sweden	Tunis, Tunisia
			Alexandersson 77'	Stadium: Stade El Menzah; Attendance: 5,000; Referee: Mahmoud Ali Abdelkrim (Libya)

27 March UEFA Euro 2000 qualifying Group 5	Sweden	2 – 0	Luxembourg	Gothenburg, Sweden
	Mjällby 34'; Larsson 87'			Stadium: Ullevi; Attendance: 37,728; Referee: Vasyl Melnychuk (Ukraine)

31 March UEFA Euro 2000 qualifying Group 5	Poland	0 – 1	Sweden	Chorzów, Poland
			Ljungberg 36'	Stadium: Silesian Stadium; Attendance: 32,000; Referee: Markus Merk (Germany)

28 April International Friendly	Republic of Ireland	2 – 0	Sweden	Dublin, Ireland
	Kavanagh 75'; Kennedy 77'			Stadium: Lansdowne Road; Attendance: 29,300; Referee: Pascal Garibian (France)

27 May International Friendly	Sweden	2 – 1	Jamaica	Stockholm, Sweden
	Osmanovski 18', 28'		Gayle 76'	Stadium: Råsunda; Attendance: 27,298; Referee: Jack van Hulten (Netherlands)

5 June UEFA Euro 2000 qualifying Group 5	England	0 – 0	Sweden	London, England
	Scholes (yellow card) 27' (red card) 51'			Stadium: Wembley Stadium; Attendance: 75,824; Referee: José María García-Aranda (Spain)

18 August International Friendly	Sweden	0 – 0	Austria	Malmö, Sweden
	Osmanovski (red card) 45'			Stadium: Malmö Stadion; Attendance: 12,222; Referee: Claus Bo Larsen (Denmark)

8 September UEFA Euro 2000 qualifying Group 5	Luxembourg	0 – 1	Sweden	Luxembourg City, Luxembourg
			Alexandersson 39'	Stadium: Stade Josy Barthel; Attendance: 4,288; Referee: Hanacsek Attila (Hungary)

9 October UEFA Euro 2000 qualifying Group 5	Sweden	2 – 0	Poland	Stockholm, Sweden
	K. Andersson 64'; Larsson 90'			Stadium: Råsunda; Attendance: 35,037; Referee: Urs Meier (Switzerland)

27 November International Friendly	South Africa	1 – 0	Sweden	Pretoria, South Africa
	Nomvethe 88'		A. Andersson (red card) 56'	Stadium: Loftus Versfeld Stadium; Attendance: 15,000; Referee: Edwin Senai (Botswana)
