= 1981 in Swedish football =

The 1981 season in Swedish football, starting January 1981 and ending December 1981:

== Honours ==
=== Official titles ===
Title	Team	Reason
Swedish Champions 1981	Östers IF	Winners of Allsvenskan
Swedish Cup Champions 1980–81	Kalmar FF	Winners of Svenska Cupen

=== Competitions ===
Level	Competition	Team
1st level	Allsvenskan 1981	Östers IF
2nd level	Division 2 Norra 1981	IFK Eskilstuna
2nd level	Division 2 Södra 1981	BK Häcken
Cup	Svenska Cupen 1980–81	Kalmar FF

== Promotions, relegations and qualifications ==
=== Promotions ===
Promoted from	Promoted to	Team	Reason
Division 3 1981	Division 2 Södra 1982	Myresjö IF	Winners of qualification play-off
Division 3 1981	Division 2 Södra 1982	IK Oddevold	Winners of qualification play-off

=== Relegations ===
Relegated from	Relegated to	Team	Reason
Allsvenskan 1981	Division 2 Norra 1982	IFK Sundsvall	13th team
Allsvenskan 1981	Division 2 Norra 1982	Djurgårdens IF	14th team
Division 2 Norra 1981	Division 3 1982	Degerfors IF	Losers of qualification play-off
Division 2 Norra 1981	Division 3 1982	Karlslunds IF	12th team
Division 2 Norra 1981	Division 3 1982	Spånga IS	13th team
Division 2 Norra 1981	Division 3 1982	GIF Sundsvall	14th team
Division 2 Södra 1981	Division 3 1982	Jönköpings Södra IF	Losers of qualification play-off
Division 2 Södra 1981	Division 3 1982	IFK Hässleholm	12th team
Division 2 Södra 1981	Division 3 1982	Grimsås IF	13th team
Division 2 Södra 1981	Division 3 1982	GAIS	14th team

=== International qualifications ===
Qualified for	Enters	Team	Reason
European Cup 1982–83	1st round	Östers IF	Winners of Allsvenskan
UEFA Cup 1982–83	1st round	IFK Norrköping	3rd team in Allsvenskan
UEFA Cup 1982–83	1st round	IK Brage	4th team in Allsvenskan
UEFA Cup Winners' Cup 1981–82	1st round	Kalmar FF	Winners of Svenska Cupen
International Football Cup 1982	Group stage	Östers IF	Winners of Allsvenskan
International Football Cup 1982	Group stage	IFK Göteborg	2nd team in Allsvenskan
International Football Cup 1982	Group stage	IFK Norrköping	3rd team in Allsvenskan
International Football Cup 1982	Group stage	IK Brage	4th team in Allsvenskan

== Domestic results ==
=== Allsvenskan 1981 ===

	Team	Pld	W	D	L	GF		GA	GD	Pts
1	Östers IF	26	19	2	5	57	–	20	+37	40
2	IFK Göteborg	26	15	6	5	60	–	24	+36	36
3	IFK Norrköping	26	12	18	6	40	–	30	+10	32
4	IK Brage	26	11	8	7	34	–	27	+7	30
5	Malmö FF	26	11	5	10	48	–	44	+4	27
6	Örgryte IS	26	12	3	11	45	–	49	-4	27
7	Hammarby IF	26	9	7	10	48	–	46	+2	25
8	AIK	26	8	8	10	35	–	34	+1	24
9	Halmstads BK	26	11	2	13	35	–	44	-9	24
10	Åtvidabergs FF	26	8	6	12	28	–	35	-7	22
11	IF Elfsborg	26	7	8	11	27	–	38	-11	22
12	Kalmar FF	26	9	3	14	28	–	38	-10	21
13	IFK Sundsvall	26	6	6	14	24	–	58	-34	18
14	Djurgårdens IF	26	6	4	16	25	–	47	-22	16

=== Allsvenskan qualification play-off 1981 ===
October 17, 1981

Kalmar FF	2–0	IFK Eskilstuna

?, Kalmar
October 25, 1981

IFK Eskilstuna	2–2	Kalmar FF

?, Eskilstuna

October 18, 1981

BK Häcken	0–1	IF Elfsborg

?, Gothenburg
October 25, 1981

IF Elfsborg	1–1	BK Häcken

?, Borås

=== Division 2 Norra 1981 ===

	Team	Pld	W	D	L	GF		GA	GD	Pts
1	IFK Eskilstuna	26	13	9	4	44	–	27	+17	35
2	Örebro SK	26	11	8	7	50	–	32	+28	30
3	Vasalunds IF	26	10	10	6	47	–	40	+7	30
4	Flens IF	26	12	6	8	43	–	41	+2	30
5	Västerås SK	26	10	10	6	37	–	36	+1	30
6	Sandvikens IF	26	10	9	7	38	–	24	+14	29
7	Karlstad BK	26	12	5	9	44	–	43	+1	29
8	Ope IF	26	10	8	8	35	–	28	+7	28
9	Gefle IF/Brynäs	26	10	7	9	40	–	41	-1	27
10	IFK Västerås	26	7	11	8	31	–	28	+3	25
11	Degerfors IF	26	7	8	11	39	–	41	-2	22
12	Karlslunds IF	26	5	8	13	33	–	48	-15	18
13	Spånga IS	26	6	5	15	29	–	55	-26	17
14	GIF Sundsvall	26	2	9	15	21	–	47	-26	13

=== Division 2 Södra 1981 ===
	Team	Pld	W	D	L	GF		GA	GD	Pts
1	BK Häcken	26	14	9	3	44	–	28	+16	37
2	IS Halmia	26	11	9	6	44	–	30	+14	31
3	Trelleborgs FF	26	12	5	9	41	–	30	+9	29
4	Karlskrona AIF	26	9	11	6	35	–	28	+7	29
5	Mjällby AIF	26	10	8	8	34	–	31	+3	28
6	Landskrona BoIS	26	10	7	9	30	–	26	+4	27
7	Västra Frölunda IF	26	8	11	7	29	–	28	+1	27
8	Helsingborgs IF	26	9	9	8	32	–	33	-1	27
9	IK Sleipner	26	9	8	9	32	–	41	-9	26
10	IFK Malmö	26	5	14	7	33	–	31	+2	24
11	Jönköpings Södra IF	26	7	9	10	39	–	45	-6	23
12	IFK Hässleholm	26	6	10	10	30	–	43	-13	22
13	Grimsås IF	26	6	6	14	29	–	42	-13	18
14	GAIS	26	3	10	13	22	–	38	-16	16

=== Division 2 qualification play-off 1981 ===
1st round

October 15, 1981

IFK Östersund	2–2	IFK Malmö

?, ?
October 18, 1981

IFK Malmö	(ag) 1–1	IFK Östersund

?, ?

October 15, 1981

Norrby IF	1–1	Myresjö IF

?, ?
October 18, 1981

Myresjö IF	(ag) 0–0	Norrby IF

?, ?

October 15, 1981

IK Oddevold	2–0	Järla IF

?, ?
October 18, 1981

Järla IF	1–1	IK Oddevold

?, ?

October 15, 1981

Jönköpings Södra IF	2–2	Gammelstads IF

?, ?
October 18, 1981

Gammelstads IF	1–3	Jönköpings Södra IF

?, ?

October 15, 1981

Lunds BK	3–0	Degerfors IF

?, ?
October 18, 1981

Degerfors IF	1–0	Lunds BK

?, ?

October 15, 1981

IFK Västerås	2–0	Kalmar AIK

?, ?
October 18, 1981

Kalmar AIK	0–1	IFK Västerås

?, ?

October 15, 1981

Varbergs BoIS	0–1	BK Forward

?, ?
October 18, 1981

BK Forward	1–1	Varbergs BoIS

?, ?

October 15, 1981

Hudiksvalls ABK	1–1	IF Brommapojkarna

?, ?
October 18, 1981

IF Brommapojkarna	2–3	Hudiksvalls ABK

?, ?

2nd round

October 21, 1981

Myresjö IF	0–0	BK Forward

?, ?
October 25, 1981

BK Forward	2–4	Myresjö IF

?, ?

October 21, 1981

IFK Västerås	3–2	Hudiksvalls ABK

?, ?
October 25, 1981

Hudiksvalls ABK	1–1	IFK Västerås

?, ?

October 21, 1981

IK Oddevold	1–0	Lunds BK

?, ?
October 25, 1981

Lunds BK	0–0	IK Oddevold

?, ?

October 22, 1981

IFK Malmö	1–0	Jönköpings Södra IF

?, ?
October 25, 1981

Jönköpings Södra IF	0–0	IFK Malmö

?, ?

=== Svenska Cupen 1980–81 ===
Final

May 7, 1981

Kalmar FF	4–0	IF Elfsborg

Råsunda, Solna

== National team results ==
February 28, 1981
Friendly
№ 573

Sweden	4–2	Norway
To. Nilsson 35'; Rönnberg 64'; Larsson 71'; Th. Nilsson 79'		Hareide 10'; Davidsen 32'

Lahden Suurhalli, Lahti
Attendance: 1,000
Referee: Mäkelä (Finland)

March 3, 1981
Friendly
№ 574

Finland	2–1	Sweden
Rajaniemi 5'; Jukka Ikäläinen 6'		Nilsson 21'

Lahden Suurhalli, Lahti
Attendance: 1,500
Referee: Laakso (Finland)

May 14, 1981
Nordic Championship 1981–83
№ 575

Sweden	1–2	Denmark
Börjesson 75'		Bastrup 63'; Elkjær 5'

Malmö Stadion, Malmö
Attendance: 12,807
Referee: Roth (West Germany)

June 3, 1981
1982 World Cup qualification
№ 576

Sweden	1–0	Northern Ireland
Borg 49' (p)

Råsunda, Solna
Attendance: 21,431
Referee: Bergamo (Italy)

June 24, 1981
1982 World Cup qualification
№ 577

Sweden	3–0	Portugal
Börjesson 40'; Hysén 56'; Svensson 73'

Råsunda, Solna
Attendance: 34,531
Referee: Milchenko (Soviet Union)

July 29, 1981
Nordic Championship 1981–83
№ 578

Sweden	1–0	Finland
Björklund 16'

Örjans Vall, Halmstad
Attendance: 9,595
Referee: Amundsen (Denmark)

August 12, 1981
Friendly
№ 579

Sweden	1–0	Bulgaria
Sjöberg 73'

Rimnersvallen, Uddevalla
Attendance: 7,561
Referee: Bjørnestad (Norway)

September 9, 1981
1982 World Cup qualification
№ 580

Scotland	2–0	Sweden
Jordan 21'; Robertson 82' (p)

Hampden Park, Glasgow
Attendance: 81,511
Referee: Daina (Switzerland)

September 23, 1981
Friendly
№ 581

Greece	2–1	Sweden
Anastopoulos 7'; Kouis 72'		Larsson 77'

Charilaou Stadium, Thessaloniki
Attendance: 14,000
Referee: Stincan (Romania)

October 14, 1981
1982 World Cup qualification
№ 582

Portugal	1–2	Sweden
Pietra 65'		Larsson 37'; Persson 90'

Estádio da Luz, Lisbon
Attendance: 75,000
Referee: Bridges (Wales)

September 28, 1981
Friendly
№ 583

Saudi Arabia	1–2	Sweden
Mosebi 29'		Larsson 23', 83'

Prince Faisal bin Fahd Stadium, Riyadh
Attendance: 30,000
Referee: Demesh (Saudi Arabia)
