= 1982 in Swedish football =

The 1982 season in Swedish football, starting January 1982 and ending December 1982:

== Events ==
- 19 May 1982: IFK Göteborg—led by Sven-Göran Eriksson—defeats Hamburger SV on Volksparkstadion, Hamburg, 3–0 and wins the 1982 UEFA Cup trophy with 4–0 on aggregate after a 1–0 win on Ullevi in the first final on 5 May 1982. This is the first ever European trophy won by a Swedish club. IFK had defeated FC Haka, SK Sturm Graz, FC Dinamo București, Valencia CF and 1. FC Kaiserslautern on the way to the final.

== Honours ==
=== Official titles ===
Title	Team	Reason
Swedish Champions 1982	IFK Göteborg	Winners of Allsvenskan play-off
Swedish Cup Champions 1981–82	IFK Göteborg	Winners of Svenska Cupen

=== Competitions ===
Level	Competition	Team
1st level	Allsvenskan 1982	IFK Göteborg
1st level	Allsvenskan play-off 1982	IFK Göteborg
2nd level	Division 2 Norra 1982	Djurgårdens IF
2nd level	Division 2 Södra 1982	Mjällby AIF
Cup	Svenska Cupen 1981–82	IFK Göteborg

== Promotions, relegations and qualifications ==
=== Promotions ===
Promoted from	Promoted to	Team	Reason
Division 2 Norra 1982	Allsvenskan 1983	Gefle IF	Winners of qualification play-off
Division 2 Södra 1982	Allsvenskan 1983	BK Häcken	Winners of qualification play-off
Division 2 Södra 1982	Allsvenskan 1983	Mjällby AIF	Winners of qualification play-off
Division 3 1982	Division 2 Norra 1983	IF Brommapojkarna	Winners of qualification play-off
Division 3 1982	Division 2 Norra 1983	Karlslunds IF	Winners of qualification play-off
Division 3 1982	Division 2 Södra 1983	Grimsås IF	Winners of qualification play-off
Division 3 1982	Division 2 Södra 1983	Kalmar AIK	Winners of qualification play-off

=== Relegations ===
Relegated from	Relegated to	Team	Reason
Allsvenskan 1982	Division 2 Norra 1983	IFK Norrköping	Losers of qualification play-off
Allsvenskan 1982	Division 2 Södra 1983	Kalmar FF	Losers of qualification play-off
Allsvenskan 1982	Division 2 Södra 1983	Åtvidabergs FF	Losers of qualification play-off
Division 2 Norra 1982	Division 3 1983	Flens IF	Losers of qualification play-off
Division 2 Norra 1982	Division 3 1983	Karlstad BK	Losers of qualification play-off
Division 2 Södra 1982	Division 3 1983	IK Oddevold	Losers of qualification play-off
Division 2 Södra 1982	Division 3 1983	IK Sleipner	Losers of qualification play-off

=== International qualifications ===
Qualified for	Enters	Team	Reason
European Cup 1983–84	1st round	IFK Göteborg	Winners of Allsvenskan play-off
UEFA Cup 1983–84	1st round	IF Elfsborg	3rd team in Allsvenskan
UEFA Cup 1983–84	1st round	Malmö FF	4th team in Allsvenskan
UEFA Cup Winners' Cup 1982–83	1st round	IFK Göteborg	Winners of Svenska Cupen
International Football Cup 1983	Group stage	IFK Göteborg	Winners of Allsvenskan
International Football Cup 1983	Group stage	Hammarby IF	2nd team in Allsvenskan
International Football Cup 1983	Group stage	IF Elfsborg	3rd team in Allsvenskan
International Football Cup 1983	Group stage	Malmö FF	4th team in Allsvenskan

== Domestic results ==
=== Allsvenskan 1982 ===

	Team	Pld	W	D	L	GF		GA	GD	Pts
1	IFK Göteborg	22	11	7	4	45	–	22	+23	29
2	Hammarby IF	22	12	4	6	42	–	27	+15	28
3	IF Elfsborg	22	9	8	5	31	–	21	+10	26
4	Malmö FF	22	7	11	4	23	–	15	+8	25
5	Östers IF	22	10	4	8	28	–	20	+8	24
6	IK Brage	22	9	6	7	24	–	27	-3	24
7	Örgryte IS	22	7	7	8	27	–	28	-1	21
8	Halmstads BK	22	7	7	8	39	–	45	-6	21
9	Kalmar FF	22	6	7	9	21	–	27	-6	19
10	IFK Norrköping	22	5	9	8	28	–	38	-10	19
11	AIK	22	4	10	8	21	–	31	-10	18
12	Åtvidabergs FF	22	4	2	16	17	–	45	-28	10

=== Allsvenskan play-off 1982 ===
Quarter-finals

October 10, 1982

Halmstads BK	1–1	IFK Göteborg

?, ?
October 13, 1982

IFK Göteborg	3–1	Halmstads BK

?, ?

October 10, 1982

Örgryte IS	0–1	Hammarby IF

?, ?
October 13, 1982

Hammarby IF	5–1	Örgryte IS

?, ?

October 10, 1982

IK Brage	0–0	IF Elfsborg

?, ?
October 13, 1982

IF Elfsborg	2–0	IK Brage

?, ?

October 10, 1982

Östers IF	0–2	Malmö FF

?, ?
October 13, 1982

Malmö FF	1–2	Östers IF

?, ?

Semi-finals

October 17, 1982

Malmö FF	0–3	IFK Göteborg

?, ?
October 24, 1982

IFK Göteborg	5–1	Malmö FF

?, ?

October 17, 1982

IF Elfsborg	3–1	Hammarby IF

?, ?
October 24, 1982

Hammarby IF	3–0	IF Elfsborg

?, ?

Final

October 27, 1982

IFK Göteborg	1–2	Hammarby IF

Nya Ullevi, Gothenburg
October 31, 1982

Hammarby IF	1–3	IFK Göteborg

Söderstadion, Stockholm

=== Allsvenskan qualification play-off 1982 ===
October 10, 1982

Gefle IF	2–0	Kalmar FF

?, Gävle
October 16, 1982

Kalmar FF	1–2	Gefle IF

?, Kalmar

October 9, 1982

BK Häcken	2–0	IFK Norrköping

?, Gothenburg
October 16, 1982

IFK Norrköping	1–0	BK Häcken

?, Norrköping

October 10, 1982

Djurgårdens IF	1–2	AIK

?, Stockholm
October 16, 1982

AIK	2–2	Djurgårdens IF

?, Solna

October 10, 1982

Mjällby AIF	1–0	Åtvidabergs FF

?, Hällevik
October 17, 1982

Åtvidabergs FF	1–1	Mjällby AIF

?, Åtvidaberg

=== Division 2 Norra 1982 ===

	Team	Pld	W	D	L	GF		GA	GD	Pts
1	Djurgårdens IF	22	13	4	5	50	–	23	+27	30
2	Gefle IF	22	12	6	4	37	–	24	+13	30
3	Sandvikens IF	22	12	5	5	35	–	17	+18	29
4	IFK Sundsvall	22	9	6	7	42	–	39	+3	24
5	Vasalunds IF	22	8	7	7	37	–	40	-3	23
6	Örebro SK	22	8	6	8	37	–	36	+1	22
7	Västerås SK	22	8	6	8	29	–	32	-3	22
8	IFK Eskilstuna	22	8	5	9	35	–	41	-6	21
9	IFK Västerås	22	5	9	8	19	–	32	-13	19
10	Ope IF	22	7	4	11	34	–	33	+1	18
11	Karlstad BK	22	4	10	8	33	–	40	-7	18
12	Flens IF	22	2	4	16	28	–	59	-31	8

=== Division 2 Södra 1982 ===
	Team	Pld	W	D	L	GF		GA	GD	Pts
1	Mjällby AIF	22	13	5	4	39	–	23	+16	31
2	BK Häcken	22	12	6	4	39	–	23	+16	30
3	Västra Frölunda IF	22	10	8	4	35	–	25	+10	28
4	Helsingborgs IF	22	10	6	6	37	–	27	+10	26
5	Landskrona BoIS	22	9	6	7	31	–	31	0	24
6	Trelleborgs FF	22	9	5	8	41	–	28	+13	23
7	IS Halmia	22	10	3	9	32	–	29	+3	23
8	IFK Malmö	22	7	5	10	23	–	29	-6	19
9	Karlskrona AIF	22	5	8	9	33	–	36	-3	18
10	Myresjö IF	22	4	8	10	32	–	48	-16	16
11	IK Oddevold	22	5	5	12	18	–	37	-19	15
12	IK Sleipner	22	3	5	14	17	–	41	-24	11

=== Division 2 qualification play-off 1982 ===
1st round

October 7, 1982

Lunds BK	0–3	Derby/Saab FF

?, ?
October 10, 1982

Derby/Saab FF	1–2	Lunds BK

?, ?

October 7, 1982

IFK Östersund	1–2	Kalmar AIK

?, ?
October 10, 1982

Kalmar AIK	1–0	IFK Östersund

?, ?

October 7, 1982

Karlstad BK	2–3	IF Brommapojkarna

?, ?
October 10, 1982

IF Brommapojkarna	2–1	Karlstad BK

?, ?

October 7, 1982

IFK Mora	0–2	Karlslunds IF

?, ?
October 10, 1982

Karlslunds IF	2–0	IFK Mora

?, ?

October 7, 1982

IF Heimer	0–1	IK Sleipner

?, ?
October 10, 1982

IK Sleipner	0–2	IF Heimer

?, ?

October 7, 1982

Grimsås IF	1–2	Flens IF

?, ?
October 10, 1982

Flens IF	0–2	Grimsås IF

?, ?

October 7, 1982

IK Oddevold	1–1	Gammelstads IF

?, ?
October 10, 1982

Gammelstads IF	1–0	IK Oddevold

?, ?

October 9, 1982

Järla IF	0–0	GAIS

?, ?
October 12, 1982

GAIS	1–1 (ag)	Järla IF

?, ?

2nd round

October 16, 1982

Derby/Saab FF	1–1	Kalmar AIK

?, ?
October 23, 1982

Kalmar AIK	6–0	Derby/Saab FF

?, ?

October 17, 1982

Grimsås IF	3–0	Gammelstads IF

?, ?
October 24, 1982

Gammelstads IF	1–1	Grimsås IF

?, ?

October 16, 1982

Karlslunds IF	1–0	IF Heimer

?, ?
October 23, 1982

IF Heimer	0–1	Karlslunds IF

?, ?

October 17, 1982

IF Brommapojkarna	6–0	Järla IF

?, ?
October 23, 1982

Järla IF	1–2	IF Brommapojkarna

?, ?

=== Svenska Cupen 1981–82 ===
Final

May 23, 1982

IFK Göteborg	3–2	Östers IF

Råsunda, Solna

== National team results ==
February 20, 1982
Friendly
№ 584

Finland	2–2	Sweden
Jaakonsaari 30', 74'		Ahlström 9' (p), 43' (p)

Lahden Suurhalli, Lahti
Attendance: 1,000
Referee: Bjørnestad (Norway)

February 21, 1982
Friendly
№ 585

Finland	2–1	Sweden
Jaakonsaari 17'; Ikäläinen 31'		Dahlkvist 69' (p)

Lahden Suurhalli, Lahti
Attendance: 1,500
Referee: Bjørnestad (Norway)

May 5, 1982
Nordic Championship 1981–83
№ 586

Denmark	1–1	Sweden
Arnesen 83'		Larsson 68'

Idrætsparken, Copenhagen
Attendance: 15,300
Referee: Nyhus (Norway)

May 19, 1982
Friendly
№ 587

Sweden	2–2	East Germany
Persson 61'; Larsson 78'		Jarohs 44'; Dörner 64'

Örjans Vall, Halmstad
Attendance: 1,629
Referee: Haugen (Norway)

June 3, 1982
Friendly
№ 588

Sweden	1–1	Soviet Union
Nilsson 85'		Blokhin 50'

Råsunda, Solna
Attendance: 12,739
Referee: Månson (Denmark)

August 11, 1982
Nordic Championship 1981–83
№ 589

Norway	1–0	Sweden
Lund 57'

Ullevaal Stadion, Oslo
Attendance: 22,406
Referee: Amundsen (Denmark)

September 8, 1982
Euro 84 qualification
№ 590

Romania	2–0	Sweden
Andone 24'; Klein 47'

Stadionul 23 August, Bucharest
Attendance: 50,000
Referee: Šoštarić (Yugoslavia)

October 6, 1982
Euro 84 qualification
№ 591

Czechoslovakia	2–2	Sweden
Janečka 47', 53'		Jingblad 89'; Eriksson 90'

Tehelné pole, Bratislava
Attendance: 14,977
Referee: Valentine (Scotland)

November 13, 1982
Euro 84 qualification
№ 592

Cyprus	0–1	Sweden
		Corneliusson 34'

Makario Stadium, Nicosia
Attendance: 8,000
Referee: Midgley (England)
