= 1982 FIFA World Cup qualification (UEFA) =

Tournament details
- Teams: 33 (from 1 confederation, and 1 unaffiliated team)

Tournament statistics
- Top scorer: (Germany) Karl-Heinz Rummenigge (9 goals)

Listed below are the dates and results for the 1982 FIFA World Cup qualification rounds for the European zone (UEFA). For an overview of the qualification rounds, see the article 1982 FIFA World Cup qualification.

A total of 32 UEFA teams entered the qualifying competition. Moreover, Israel were also assigned to the European zone despite not being a UEFA member. The European zone was allocated 14 places (out of 24) in the final tournament. Spain, the hosts, qualified automatically, leaving 13 spots open for competition between 33 teams.

The 33 teams were divided into 7 groups. The teams would play against each other on a home-and-away basis. The number of teams and spots for each group were as follows:

- Groups 1 to 6 had 5 teams each. The group winners and runners-up would qualify.
- Group 7 had 3 teams. The group winner would qualify.

== Draw ==
The draw for the qualifying groups took place in the Zürichhorn Casino in Zürich, Switzerland on 14 October 1979. During the draw procedure, the 33 entrants were drawn into the 7 qualifying groups from the five pots of seeds, which had been announced ten days prior. As Group 7 only featured 3 teams (one team from Pot A, one team from Pot C and one team from Pot E), only the group winner of this group would qualify.

Pot A	Pot B	Pot C	Pot D	Pot E
England; Scotland; Czechoslovakia; Poland; Italy; Netherlands; West Germany	Yugoslavia; France; Austria; Hungary; Soviet Union; Sweden	East Germany; Belgium; Wales; Portugal; Switzerland; Greece; Bulgaria	Romania; Northern Ireland; Turkey; Denmark; Finland; Republic of Ireland	Malta; Albania; Cyprus; Luxembourg; Iceland; Norway; Israel* Israel added to Group 6 after the draw for political reasons

=== Summary ===
The 7 group winners and the 6 runners-up from groups 1–6 qualified directly for the 1982 FIFA World Cup
All other teams were eliminated

Group 1	Group 2	Group 3	Group 4	Group 5	Group 6	Group 7
West Germany	Belgium	Soviet Union	Hungary	Yugoslavia	Scotland	Poland
Austria	France	Czechoslovakia	England	Italy	Northern Ireland	East Germany
Bulgaria Albania Finland	Republic of Ireland Netherlands Cyprus	Wales Iceland Turkey	Romania Switzerland Norway	Denmark Greece Luxembourg	Sweden Portugal Israel	Malta

== Groups ==
=== Group 1 ===
Rank	Team	Pts	Pld	W	D	L	GF	GA	GD
1	West Germany	16	8	8	0	0	33	3	+30
2	Austria	11	8	5	1	2	16	6	+10
3	Bulgaria	9	8	4	1	3	11	10	+1
4	Albania	2	8	1	0	7	4	22	−18
5	Finland	2	8	1	0	7	4	27	−23

West Germany and Austria qualified.

=== Group 2 ===
Rank	Team	Pts	Pld	W	D	L	GF	GA	GD
1	Belgium	11	8	5	1	2	12	9	+3
2	France	10	8	5	0	3	20	8	+12
3	Republic of Ireland	10	8	4	2	2	17	11	+6
4	Netherlands	9	8	4	1	3	11	7	+4
5	Cyprus	0	8	0	0	8	4	29	−25

Belgium and France qualified.

=== Group 3 ===
Rank	Team	Pts	Pld	W	D	L	GF	GA	GD
1	Soviet Union	14	8	6	2	0	20	2	+18
2	Czechoslovakia	10	8	4	2	2	15	6	+9
3	Wales	10	8	4	2	2	12	7	+5
4	Iceland	6	8	2	2	4	10	21	−11
5	Turkey	0	8	0	0	8	1	22	−21

Soviet Union and Czechoslovakia qualified.

=== Group 4 ===
Rank	Team	Pts	Pld	W	D	L	GF	GA	GD
1	Hungary	10	8	4	2	2	13	8	+5
2	England	9	8	4	1	3	13	8	+5
3	Romania	8	8	2	4	2	5	5	0
4	Switzerland	7	8	2	3	3	9	12	−3
5	Norway	6	8	2	2	4	8	15	−7

Hungary and England qualified.

=== Group 5 ===
Rank	Team	Pts	Pld	W	D	L	GF	GA	GD
1	Yugoslavia	13	8	6	1	1	22	7	+15
2	Italy	12	8	5	2	1	12	5	+7
3	Denmark	8	8	4	0	4	14	11	+3
4	Greece	7	8	3	1	4	10	13	−3
5	Luxembourg	0	8	0	0	8	1	23	−22

Yugoslavia and Italy qualified.

=== Group 6 ===
Rank	Team	Pts	Pld	W	D	L	GF	GA	GD
1	Scotland	11	8	4	3	1	9	4	+5
2	Northern Ireland	9	8	3	3	2	6	3	+3
3	Sweden	8	8	3	2	3	7	8	−1
4	Portugal	7	8	3	1	4	8	11	−3
5	Israel	5	8	1	3	4	6	10	−4

Scotland and Northern Ireland qualified.

=== Group 7 ===
Rank	Team	Pts	Pld	W	D	L	GF	GA	GD
1	Poland	8	4	4	0	0	12	2	+10
2	East Germany	4	4	2	0	2	9	6	+3
3	Malta	0	4	0	0	4	2	15	−13

Poland qualified.

== Goalscorers ==
9 goals

- (West Germany) Karl-Heinz Rummenigge

7 goals

- (West Germany) Klaus Fischer
- (Socialist Federal Republic of Yugoslavia) Zlatko Vujović

6 goals

- (Denmark) Frank Arnesen

5 goals

- (Belgium) Erwin Vandenbergh
- (France) Michel Platini
- (Greece) Dinos Kouis
- (Poland) Włodzimierz Smolarek
- (Soviet Union) Oleg Blokhin
- (West Germany) Manfred Kaltz

4 goals

- (Austria) Kurt Welzl
- (Belgium) Jan Ceulemans
- (Bulgaria) Georgi Slavkov
- (Denmark) Preben Elkjær
- (Hungary) László Kiss
- (Soviet Union) Ramaz Shengelia

3 goals

- (Austria) Hans Krankl
- (Austria) Walter Schachner
- (Czechoslovakia) Ján Kozák
- (Czechoslovakia) Zdeněk Nehoda
- (East Germany) Joachim Streich
- (England) Paul Mariner
- (England) Terry McDermott
- (France) Bernard Lacombe
- (France) Didier Six
- (Hungary) László Fazekas
- (Republic of Ireland) Gerry Daly
- (Republic of Ireland) Michael Robinson
- (Republic of Ireland) Frank Stapleton
- (Israel) Benny Tabak
- (Italy) Francesco Graziani
- (Portugal) Rui Jordão
- (Scotland) John Robertson
- (Soviet Union) Sergey Andreyev
- (Switzerland) Claudio Sulser
- (Wales) Ian Walsh
- (West Germany) Paul Breitner
- (West Germany) Pierre Littbarski
- (Socialist Federal Republic of Yugoslavia) Vahid Halilhodžić

2 goals

- (Austria) Kurt Jara
- (Austria) Herbert Prohaska
- (Bulgaria) Kostadin Kostadinov
- (Czechoslovakia) Petr Janečka
- (Czechoslovakia) Ladislav Vízek
- (East Germany) Rüdiger Schnuphase
- (England) Trevor Brooking
- (England) Tony Woodcock
- (France) Jean-François Larios
- (France) Gerard Soler
- (France) Jacques Zimako
- (Greece) Georgios Kostikos
- (Greece) Thomas Mavros
- (Hungary) László Bálint
- (Hungary) Tibor Nyilasi
- (Iceland) Ásgeir Sigurvinsson
- (Republic of Ireland) Tony Grealish
- (Republic of Ireland) Mark Lawrenson
- (Republic of Ireland) Paul McGee
- (Israel) Gidi Damti
- (Italy) Roberto Bettega
- (Italy) Fulvio Collovati
- (Italy) Bruno Conti
- (Netherlands) Arnold Mühren
- (Netherlands) Cees van Kooten
- (Northern Ireland) Gerry Armstrong
- (Norway) Åge Hareide
- (Norway) Tom Lund
- (Norway) Hallvar Thoresen
- (Portugal) Humberto Coelho
- (Portugal) Manuel Fernandes
- (Romania) Anghel Iordănescu
- (Soviet Union) Yuri Gavrilov
- (Soviet Union) Khoren Oganesian
- (Switzerland) Umberto Barberis
- (Wales) Brian Flynn
- (Wales) David Giles
- (Wales) Leighton James
- (West Germany) Bernd Schuster
- (Socialist Federal Republic of Yugoslavia) Dragan Pantelić
- (Socialist Federal Republic of Yugoslavia) Vladimir Petrović
- (Socialist Federal Republic of Yugoslavia) Ivica Šurjak

1 goal

- (Albania) Millan Baçi
- (Albania) Sefedin Braho
- (Albania) Ilir Përnaska
- (Albania) Muhedin Targaj
- (Austria) Gernot Jurtin
- (Austria) Bruno Pezzey
- (Belgium) Albert Cluytens
- (Belgium) Alexandre Czerniatynski
- (Belgium) Gerard Plessers
- (Bulgaria) Plamen Markov
- (Bulgaria) Stoycho Mladenov
- (Bulgaria) Chavdar Tsvetkov
- (Bulgaria) Tsvetan Yonchev
- (Bulgaria) Andrey Zhelyazkov
- (Cyprus) Sotiris Kaiafas
- (Cyprus) Stefanos Lysandrou
- (Cyprus) Nikos Pantziaras
- (Cyprus) Fivos Vrachimis
- (Czechoslovakia) Verner Lička
- (Czechoslovakia) Antonín Panenka
- (Czechoslovakia) Rostislav Vojáček
- (Denmark) Lars Bastrup
- (Denmark) Søren Lerby
- (Denmark) Per Røntved
- (Denmark) Allan Simonsen
- (East Germany) Reinhard Häfner
- (East Germany) Jürgen Heun
- (East Germany) Andreas Krause
- (England) Kevin Keegan
- (England) Bryan Robson
- (Finland) Leo Houtsonen
- (Finland) Keijo Kousa
- (Finland) Hannu Turunen
- (Finland) Ari Valvee
- (France) Bruno Bellone
- (France) Bernard Genghini
- (France) Dominique Rocheteau
- (Greece) Nikos Anastopoulos
- (Hungary) Imre Garaba
- (Hungary) Sándor Müller
- (Iceland) Magnús Bergs
- (Iceland) Atli Eðvaldsson
- (Iceland) Janus Guðlaugsson
- (Iceland) Albert Guðmundsson
- (Iceland) Lárus Guðmundsson
- (Iceland) Pétur Ormslev
- (Iceland) Árni Sveinsson
- (Iceland) Teitur Þórðarson
- (Republic of Ireland) Chris Hughton
- (Israel) Moshe Sinai
- (Italy) Giancarlo Antognoni
- (Italy) Antonio Cabrini
- (Italy) Gaetano Scirea
- (Luxembourg) Alain Nurenberg
- (Malta) Emanuel Fabri
- (Malta) Ernest Spiteri-Gonzi
- (Netherlands) Ruud Geels
- (Netherlands) Hugo Hovenkamp
- (Netherlands) John Metgod
- (Netherlands) Dick Nanninga
- (Netherlands) Cees Schapendonk
- (Netherlands) Simon Tahamata
- (Netherlands) Frans Thijssen
- (Northern Ireland) Noel Brotherston
- (Northern Ireland) Billy Hamilton
- (Northern Ireland) Sammy McIlroy
- (Northern Ireland) Jimmy Nicholl
- (Norway) Vidar Davidsen
- (Norway) Svein Mathisen
- (Poland) Zbigniew Boniek
- (Poland) Andrzej Buncol
- (Poland) Dariusz Dziekanowski
- (Poland) Andrzej Iwan
- (Poland) Leszek Lipka
- (Poland) Stefan Majewski
- (Poland) Andrzej Szarmach
- (Portugal) Minervino Pietra
- (Romania) Ilie Balaci
- (Romania) Marcel Răducanu
- (Romania) Aurel Ţicleanu
- (Scotland) Kenny Dalglish
- (Scotland) Joe Jordan
- (Scotland) David Provan
- (Scotland) Gordon Strachan
- (Scotland) Paul Sturrock
- (Scotland) John Wark
- (Soviet Union) Volodymyr Bezsonov
- (Soviet Union) Aleksandr Chivadze
- (Soviet Union) Vitaly Daraselia
- (Soviet Union) Anatoliy Demianenko
- (Sweden) Hasse Borg
- (Sweden) Bo Börjesson
- (Sweden) Thomas Larsson
- (Sweden) Tony Persson
- (Sweden) Sten-Ove Ramberg
- (Sweden) Jan Svensson
- (Switzerland) Robert Lüthi
- (Switzerland) Hans-Jörg Pfister
- (Switzerland) Alfred Scheiwilder
- (Switzerland) Gian Pietro Zappa
- (Turkey) Fatih Terim
- (Wales) Alan Curtis
- (Wales) Carl Harris
- (Wales) Robbie James
- (West Germany) Hans-Peter Briegel
- (West Germany) Wolfgang Dremmler
- (West Germany) Felix Magath
- (Socialist Federal Republic of Yugoslavia) Ivan Buljan
- (Socialist Federal Republic of Yugoslavia) Jurica Jerković
- (Socialist Federal Republic of Yugoslavia) Predrag Pašić
- (Socialist Federal Republic of Yugoslavia) Edhem Šljivo
- (Socialist Federal Republic of Yugoslavia) Safet Sušić
- (Socialist Federal Republic of Yugoslavia) Zoran Vujović

1 own goal

- (Austria) Bernd Krauss (playing against West Germany)
- (France) Philippe Mahut (playing against Ireland)
- (Iceland) Þorsteinn Bjarnason (playing against Czechoslovakia)
- (Malta) John Holland (playing against East Germany)
- (Portugal) Gabriel Mendes (playing against Sweden)
- (Switzerland) Markus Tanner (playing against England)
- (Wales) Dai Davies (playing against Czechoslovakia)

== See also ==
- 1982 FIFA World Cup qualification (CONMEBOL)
- 1982 FIFA World Cup qualification (CONCACAF)
- 1982 FIFA World Cup qualification (CAF)
- 1982 FIFA World Cup qualification (AFC and OFC)
