= 1980 in Swedish football =

The 1980 season in Swedish football, starting January 1980 and ending December 1980:

== Honours ==
=== Official titles ===
| Title | Team | Reason |
|---|---|---|
| Swedish Champions 1980 | Östers IF | Winners of Allsvenskan |
| Swedish Cup Champions 1979–80 | Malmö FF | Winners of Svenska Cupen |

=== Competitions ===
| Level | Competition | Team |
|---|---|---|
| 1st level | Allsvenskan 1980 | Östers IF |
| 2nd level | Division 2 Norra 1980 | AIK |
| 2nd level | Division 2 Södra 1980 | Örgryte IS |
| Cup | Svenska Cupen 1979–80 | Malmö FF |

== Promotions, relegations and qualifications ==
=== Promotions ===
| Promoted from | Promoted to | Team | Reason |
|---|---|---|---|
| Division 2 Norra 1980 | Allsvenskan 1981 | AIK | Winners |
| Division 2 Södra 1980 | Allsvenskan 1981 | Örgryte IS | Winners |
| Division 3 1980 | Division 2 Norra 1981 | Ope IF | Winners of qualification play-off |
| Division 3 1980 | Division 2 Norra 1981 | Flens IF | Winners of qualification play-off |
| Division 3 1980 | Division 2 Norra 1981 | Spånga IS | 2nd in qualification play-off |
| Division 3 1980 | Division 2 Norra 1981 | Karlslunds IF | 2nd in qualification play-off |
| Division 3 1980 | Division 2 Södra 1981 | Västra Frölunda IF | Winners of qualification play-off |
| Division 3 1980 | Division 2 Södra 1981 | Trelleborgs FF | 2nd in qualification play-off |

=== Relegations ===
| Relegated from | Relegated to | Team | Reason |
|---|---|---|---|
| Allsvenskan 1980 | Division 1 Södra 1981 | Landskrona BoIS | 13th team |
| Allsvenskan 1980 | Division 1 Södra 1981 | Mjällby AIF | 14th team |
| Division 2 Norra 1980 | Division 3 1981 | BK Forward | 12th team |
| Division 2 Norra 1980 | Division 3 1981 | IF Brommapojkarna | 13th team |
| Division 2 Norra 1980 | Division 3 1981 | Hudiksvalls ABK | 14th team |
| Division 2 Södra 1980 | Division 3 1981 | IFK Kristianstad | 12th team |
| Division 2 Södra 1980 | Division 3 1981 | Kalmar AIK | 13th team |
| Division 2 Södra 1980 | Division 3 1981 | Nyköpings BIS | 14th team |

== Domestic results ==
=== Allsvenskan 1980 ===
| | Team | Pld | W | D | L | GF | | GA | GD | Pts |
|---|---|---|---|---|---|---|---|---|---|---|
| 1 | Östers IF | 26 | 13 | 11 | 2 | 41 | – | 16 | +25 | 37 |
| 2 | Malmö FF | 26 | 13 | 9 | 4 | 37 | – | 22 | +15 | 35 |
| 3 | IFK Göteborg | 26 | 12 | 10 | 4 | 45 | – | 26 | +19 | 34 |
| 4 | IK Brage | 26 | 12 | 9 | 5 | 29 | – | 18 | +11 | 33 |
| 5 | Hammarby IF | 26 | 11 | 8 | 7 | 49 | – | 31 | +18 | 30 |
| 6 | IF Elfsborg | 26 | 8 | 12 | 6 | 32 | – | 26 | +6 | 28 |
| 7 | IFK Sundsvall | 26 | 8 | 10 | 8 | 31 | – | 37 | -6 | 26 |
| 8 | Halmstads BK | 26 | 8 | 9 | 9 | 32 | – | 28 | +4 | 25 |
| 9 | Kalmar FF | 26 | 8 | 8 | 10 | 25 | – | 33 | -8 | 24 |
| 10 | IFK Norrköping | 26 | 7 | 8 | 11 | 25 | – | 39 | -14 | 22 |
| 11 | Åtvidabergs FF | 26 | 5 | 11 | 10 | 29 | – | 37 | -8 | 21 |
| 12 | Djurgårdens IF | 26 | 7 | 7 | 12 | 24 | – | 37 | -13 | 21 |
| 13 | Landskrona BoIS | 26 | 5 | 7 | 14 | 26 | – | 46 | -20 | 17 |
| 14 | Mjällby AIF | 26 | 3 | 5 | 18 | 18 | – | 47 | -29 | 11 |

=== Division 2 Norra 1980 ===
| | Team | Pld | W | D | L | GF | | GA | GD | Pts |
|---|---|---|---|---|---|---|---|---|---|---|
| 1 | AIK | 26 | 18 | 5 | 3 | 60 | – | 19 | +41 | 41 |
| 2 | Örebro SK | 26 | 16 | 6 | 4 | 52 | – | 14 | +38 | 38 |
| 3 | Vasalunds IF | 26 | 12 | 9 | 5 | 39 | – | 30 | +9 | 33 |
| 4 | Karlstads BK | 26 | 14 | 4 | 8 | 32 | – | 31 | +1 | 32 |
| 5 | Västerås SK | 26 | 13 | 5 | 8 | 45 | – | 40 | +5 | 31 |
| 6 | IFK Västerås | 26 | 9 | 9 | 8 | 35 | – | 30 | +5 | 27 |
| 7 | IFK Eskilstuna | 26 | 9 | 9 | 8 | 32 | – | 32 | 0 | 27 |
| 8 | Degerfors IF | 26 | 9 | 7 | 10 | 37 | – | 39 | -2 | 25 |
| 9 | GIF Sundsvall | 26 | 6 | 11 | 9 | 28 | – | 34 | -6 | 23 |
| 10 | Gefle IF/Brynäs | 26 | 7 | 8 | 11 | 29 | – | 36 | -7 | 22 |
| 11 | Sandvikens IF | 26 | 6 | 10 | 10 | 25 | – | 34 | -9 | 22 |
| 12 | BK Forward | 26 | 4 | 9 | 13 | 26 | – | 44 | -18 | 17 |
| 13 | IF Brommapojkarna | 26 | 6 | 4 | 16 | 35 | – | 55 | -20 | 16 |
| 14 | Hudiksvalls ABK | 26 | 2 | 6 | 18 | 26 | – | 63 | -37 | 10 |

=== Division 2 Södra 1980 ===
| | Team | Pld | W | D | L | GF | | GA | GD | Pts |
|---|---|---|---|---|---|---|---|---|---|---|
| 1 | Örgryte IS | 26 | 12 | 7 | 7 | 45 | – | 32 | +13 | 31 |
| 2 | GAIS | 26 | 13 | 5 | 8 | 35 | – | 22 | +13 | 31 |
| 3 | IFK Malmö | 26 | 11 | 9 | 6 | 30 | – | 25 | +5 | 31 |
| 4 | Grimsås IF | 26 | 11 | 7 | 8 | 29 | – | 24 | +5 | 29 |
| 5 | Helsingborgs IF | 26 | 10 | 8 | 8 | 33 | – | 23 | -10 | 28 |
| 6 | BK Häcken | 26 | 12 | 4 | 10 | 39 | – | 31 | +8 | 28 |
| 7 | Jönköpings Södra IF | 26 | 11 | 6 | 9 | 34 | – | 31 | +3 | 28 |
| 8 | IS Halmia | 26 | 11 | 5 | 10 | 30 | – | 28 | +2 | 27 |
| 9 | Karlskrona AIF | 26 | 10 | 7 | 9 | 27 | – | 29 | -2 | 27 |
| 10 | IFK Hässleholm | 26 | 8 | 9 | 9 | 26 | – | 33 | -7 | 25 |
| 11 | IK Sleipner | 26 | 8 | 8 | 10 | 26 | – | 30 | -4 | 24 |
| 12 | IFK Kristianstad | 26 | 9 | 6 | 11 | 28 | – | 36 | -8 | 24 |
| 13 | Kalmar AIK | 26 | 1 | 14 | 11 | 12 | – | 32 | -20 | 16 |
| 14 | Nyköpings BIS | 26 | 5 | 5 | 16 | 20 | – | 38 | -18 | 15 |

=== Svenska Cupen 1979–80 ===
Final

June 1, 1980

| Malmö FF | 3–3 4–3 (apen) | IK Brage |

Råsunda, Solna

== National team results ==
April 29, 1980
Friendly
№ 563

| Sweden | 1–5 | Soviet Union |
|---|---|---|
| Nordgren 24' | | Andreyev 7', 25'; Gavrilov 17'; Chelebadze 39' (p); Fedorenko 85' |

Malmö Stadion, Malmö
Attendance: 10,613
Referee: White (England)

May 7, 1980
Nordic Championship 1978–80
№ 564

| Sweden | 0–1 | Denmark |
|---|---|---|
| | | Steffensen 13' |

Nya Ullevi, Gothenburg
Attendance: 20,179
Referee: Bjørnestad (Norway)

May 22, 1980
Nordic Championship 1978–80
№ 565

| Finland | 0–2 | Sweden |
|---|---|---|
| | | Nordgren 6'; Sjöberg 31' |

Olympiastadion, Helsinki
Attendance: 9,189
Referee: Nielsen (Denmark)

June 18, 1980
1982 World Cup qualification
№ 566

| Sweden | 1–1 | Israel |
|---|---|---|
| Ramberg 35' | | Damti 80' |

Råsunda, Solna
Attendance: 24,711
Referee: Hirviniemi (Finland)

July 17, 1980
Friendly
№ 567

| Sweden | 1–1 | Iceland |
|---|---|---|
| Backe 80' | | Þorbjörnsson 87' |

Örjans Vall, Halmstad
Attendance: 10,690
Referee: Månsson (Denmark)

August 20, 1980
Friendly
№ 568

| Hungary | 2–0 | Sweden |
|---|---|---|
| Bild 73' (og); Burcsa 80' |

Népstadion, Budapest
Attendance: 18,000
Referee: Linemayr (Austria)

September 10, 1980
1982 World Cup qualification
№ 569

| Sweden | 0–1 | Scotland |
|---|---|---|
| | | Strahan 72' |

Råsunda, Solna
Attendance: 39,831
Referee: Wöhrer (Austria)

September 24, 1980
Friendly
№ 570

| Bulgaria | 2–3 | Sweden |
|---|---|---|
| Tzvetkov 32'; Markov 49' | | Ramberg 72'; Ohlsson 74'; Holmgren 85' |

9 Septembri Stadion, Burgas
Attendance: 16,000
Referee: Göksel (Turkey)

October 15, 1980
1982 World Cup qualification
№ 571

| Northern Ireland | 3–0 | Sweden |
|---|---|---|
| Brotherston 24'; McIlroy 28'; J.Nicholl 37' |

Windsor Park, Belfast
Attendance: 20,000
Referee: Ponnet (Belgium)

November 12, 1980
1982 World Cup qualification
№ 572

| Israel | 0–0 | Sweden |

Ramat Gan Stadium, Ramat Gan
Attendance: 46,000
Referee: Courtney (England)
