= 1982 FIFA World Cup qualification – UEFA Group 6 =

Football tournament qualification stage

1982 FIFA World Cup qualification UEFA Group 6 consisted of five of the 34 teams entered into the European zone: Scotland, Sweden, Portugal, Northern Ireland and Israel. These five teams competed on a home-and-away basis for two of the 14 spots in the final tournament allocated to the European zone, with the group's winner and runner-up claiming that spot.

== Standings ==
Rank	Team	Pts	Pld	W	D	L	GF	GA	GD
1	Scotland	11	8	4	3	1	9	4	+5
2	Northern Ireland	9	8	3	3	2	6	3	+3
3	Sweden	8	8	3	2	3	7	8	−1
4	Portugal	7	8	3	1	4	8	11	−3
5	Israel	5	8	1	3	4	6	10	−4

== Results ==
26 March 1980

Israel	0 – 0	Northern Ireland
	Repoet

Ramat Gan Stadium, Ramat Gan
Attendance: 34,000
Referee: Stjepan Glavina (Yugoslavia)

18 June 1980

Sweden	1 – 1	Israel
Ramberg 35'	Report	Damti 80'

Råsunda Stadium, Stockholm
Attendance: 24,711
Referee: Martti Hirviniemi (Finland)

10 September 1980

Sweden	0 – 1	Scotland
	Report	Strachan 72'

Råsunda Stadium, Stockholm
Attendance: 39,831
Referee: Franz Wöhrer (Austria)

15 October 1980

Northern Ireland	3 – 0	Sweden
Brotherston 24'; McIlroy 28'; J. Nicholl 37'	Report

Windsor Park, Belfast
Attendance: 18,000
Referee: Alexis Ponnet (Belgium)
15 October 1980

Scotland	0 – 0	Portugal
	Report

Hampden Park, Glasgow
Attendance: 60,765
Referee: Jan Redelfs (West Germany)

12 November 1980

Israel	0 – 0	Sweden
	Report

Ramat Gan Stadium, Ramat Gan
Attendance: 37,654
Referee: George Courtney (England)

19 November 1980

Portugal	1 – 0	Northern Ireland
Jordão 60'	Report

Estádio da Luz, Lisbon
Attendance: 60,000
Referee: Georges Konrath (France)

17 December 1980

Portugal	3 – 0	Israel
Coelho 33', 72'; Jordão 36'	Report

Estádio da Luz, Lisbon
Attendance: 38,926
Referee: Enzo Barbaresco (Italy)

25 February 1981

Israel	0 – 1	Scotland
	Report	Dalglish 54'

Ramat Gan Stadium, Ramat Gan
Attendance: 35,000
Referee: Anderco (Romania)

25 March 1981

Scotland	1 – 1	Northern Ireland
Wark 75'	Report	Hamilton 70'

Hampden Park, Glasgow
Attendance: 78,444
Referee: Klaus Scheurell (East Germany)

28 April 1981

Scotland	3 – 1	Israel
Robertson 21' (pen.), 30' (pen.); Provan 54'	Report	Sinai 56'

Hampden Park, Glasgow
Attendance: 61,489
Referee: Gudmundur Haraldsson (Iceland)
29 April 1981

Northern Ireland	1 – 0	Portugal
Armstrong 74'	Report

Windsor Park, Belfast
Attendance: 18,000
Referee: Svein-Inge Thime (Norway)

3 June 1981

Sweden	1 – 0	Northern Ireland
Borg 50' (pen.)	Report

Råsunda Stadium, Stockholm
Attendance: 21,431
Referee: Paolo Bergamo (Italy)

24 June 1981

Sweden	3 – 0	Portugal
Börjesson 39'; G. Mendes 55' (o.g.); J. Svensson 67'	Report

Råsunda Stadium, Stockholm
Attendance: 34,531
Referee: Anatoly Milchenko (Soviet Union)

9 September 1981

Scotland	2 – 0	Sweden
Jordan 20'; Robertson 80' (pen.)	Report

Hampden Park, Glasgow
Attendance: 81,511
Referee: André Daina (Switzerland)

14 October 1981

Northern Ireland	0 – 0	Scotland
	Report

Windsor Park, Belfast
Attendance: 22,248
Referee: Valeri Butenko (Soviet Union)
14 October 1981

Portugal	1 – 2	Sweden
Pietra 65'	Report	Larsson 38'; Persson 89'

Estádio da Luz, Lisbon
Attendance: 75,000
Referee: Ronald Bridges (Wales)

28 October 1981

Israel	4 – 1	Portugal
Tabak 6', 18', 30'; Damti 14'	Report	Jordão 8'

Ramat Gan Stadium, Ramat Gan
Attendance: 16,192
Referee: Afxentiou (Cyprus)

18 November 1981

Northern Ireland	1 – 0	Israel
Armstrong 27'	Report

Windsor Park, Belfast
Attendance: 38,000
Referee: Emilio Guruceta Muro (Spain)
18 November 1981

Portugal	2 – 1	Scotland
Manuel Fernandes 33', 56'	Report	Sturrock 9'

Estádio da Luz, Lisbon
Attendance: 25,000
Referee: Charles Corver (Netherlands)

== Goalscorers ==
3 goals

- (Israel) Benny Tabak
- (Portugal) Rui Jordão
- (Scotland) John Robertson

2 goals

- (Israel) Gidi Damti
- (Northern Ireland) Gerry Armstrong
- (Portugal) Humberto Coelho
- (Portugal) Manuel Fernandes

1 goal

- (Israel) Moshe Sinai
- (Northern Ireland) Noel Brotherston
- (Northern Ireland) Billy Hamilton
- (Northern Ireland) Sammy McIlroy
- (Northern Ireland) Jimmy Nicholl
- (Portugal) Minervino Pietra
- (Scotland) Kenny Dalglish
- (Scotland) Joe Jordan
- (Scotland) David Provan
- (Scotland) Gordon Strachan
- (Scotland) Paul Sturrock
- (Scotland) John Wark
- (Sweden) Hasse Borg
- (Sweden) Bo Börjesson
- (Sweden) Thomas Larsson
- (Sweden) Tony Persson
- (Sweden) Sten-Ove Ramberg
- (Sweden) Jan Svensson

1 own goal

- (Portugal) Gabriel Mendes (playing against Sweden)
