= Thomas Nilsson =

Thomas Nilsson may refer to:

- Thomas Nilsson (athlete)
- Thomas Nilsson (footballer)
