= UEFA Euro 1980 qualifying Group 5 =

Football tournament qualification stage

Standings and results for Group 5 of the UEFA Euro 1980 qualifying tournament.

Group 5 consisted of Czechoslovakia, France, Luxembourg and Sweden. Group winners were the reigning European champions Czechoslovakia, who pipped France by a single point. This pair dominated the group, winning won all their games against the other two nations, with the exception of France's opening draw with Sweden.

== Final table ==
Pos	Team	Pld	W	D	L	GF	GA	GD	Pts	Qualification	(Czechoslovakia)	(France)	(Sweden)	(Luxembourg)
1	Czechoslovakia	6	5	0	1	17	4	+13	10	Qualify for final tournament	—	2–0	4–1	4–0
2	France	6	4	1	1	13	7	+6	9		2–1	—	2–2	3–0
3	Sweden	6	1	2	3	9	13	−4	4		1–3	1–3	—	3–0
4	Luxembourg	6	0	1	5	2	17	−15	1		0–3	1–3	1–1	—

Source: UEFA
Rules for classification: Qualification tiebreakers

== Results ==
1 September 1978

France	2–2	Sweden
Berdoll 72'; Six 83'		Nordgren 54'; Grönhagen 90'

Parc des Princes, Paris
Attendance: 44,703
Referee: Palotai (HUN)

4 October 1978

Sweden	1–3	Czechoslovakia
Borg 15' (pen.)		Masný 17', 47'; Nehoda 85'

Råsunda Stadium, Stockholm
Attendance: 10,826
Referee: Gordon (SCO)

7 October 1978

Luxembourg	1–3	France
Michaux 73'		Six 14'; Trésor 62'; Gemmrich 79'

Stade Josy Barthel, Luxembourg City
Attendance: 12,652
Referee: Weerink (NED)

25 February 1979

France	3–0	Luxembourg
Petit 38'; Emon 62'; Larios 80'

Parc des Princes, Paris
Attendance: 46,988
Referee: Bridges (WAL)

4 April 1979

Czechoslovakia	2–0	France
Panenka 67' (pen.); Štambachr 72'

Tehelné Pole Stadium, Bratislava
Attendance: 48,138
Referee: Aldinger (FRG)

1 May 1979

Luxembourg	0–3	Czechoslovakia
		Masný 22'; Gajdůšek 67'; Štambachr 68'

Stade Josy Barthel, Luxembourg City
Attendance: 4,027
Referee: Galler (SUI)

7 June 1979

Sweden	3–0	Luxembourg
Grönhagen 15'; Cervin 29'; Borg 54' (pen.)

Malmö Stadion, Malmö
Attendance: 7,298
Referee: Suchanek (POL)

5 September 1979

Sweden	1–3	France
Backe 24'		Lacombe 14'; Platini 55'; Battiston 71'

Råsunda Stadium, Stockholm
Attendance: 14,393
Referee: Martinez (ESP)

10 October 1979

Czechoslovakia	4–1	Sweden
Nehoda 20'; Kozák 34'; Vízek 41', 78'		Svensson 61'

Stadion Evžena Rošického, Prague
Attendance: 24,783
Referee: Tokat (TUR)

23 October 1979

Luxembourg	1–1	Sweden
Braun 4' (pen.)		Grönhagen 61'

Stade de la Frontière, Esch-sur-Alzette
Attendance: 2,123
Referee: Horstmann (FRG)

17 November 1979

France	2–1	Czechoslovakia
Pécout 67'; Rampillon 75'		Kozák 80'

Parc des Princes, Paris
Attendance: 39,973
Referee: Brummeier (AUT)

24 November 1979

Czechoslovakia	4–0	Luxembourg
Panenka 37'; Masný 39', 45'; Vízek 61'

Stadion Evžena Rošického, Prague
Attendance: 10,063
Referee: Van Langenhove (BEL)

== Goalscorers ==
There were 41 goals scored in 12 matches, for an average of 3.42 goals per match.

5 goals

- (Czechoslovakia) Marián Masný

3 goals

- (Czechoslovakia) Ladislav Vízek
- (Sweden) Anders Grönhagen

2 goals

- (Czechoslovakia) Ján Kozák
- (Czechoslovakia) Zdeněk Nehoda
- (Czechoslovakia) Antonín Panenka
- (Czechoslovakia) František Štambachr
- (France) Didier Six
- (Sweden) Hasse Borg

1 goal

- (Czechoslovakia) Miroslav Gajdůšek
- (France) Patrick Battiston
- (France) Marc Berdoll
- (France) Albert Emon
- (France) Albert Gemmrich
- (France) Bernard Lacombe
- (France) Jean-François Larios
- (France) Éric Pécout
- (France) Jean Petit
- (France) Michel Platini
- (France) Gilles Rampillon
- (France) Marius Trésor
- (Luxembourg) Nico Braun
- (Luxembourg) Romain Michaux
- (Sweden) Rutger Backe
- (Sweden) Tore Cervin
- (Sweden) Mats Nordgren
- (Sweden) Jan Svensson
