= Anders Ohlsson =

Swedish footballer

Personal information
- Full name: Anders Ohlsson
- Position: Forward

Senior career*
Years	Team	Apps	(Gls)
1979–1983	Malmö FF	44	(4)
- * Club domestic league appearances and goals

Anders Ohlsson is Swedish former footballer who played as a forward. He played 44 matches and scored four goals for Malmö FF between 1979 and 1983.
