= Stefanos Lysandrou =

Cypriot footballer

Personal information
- Full name: Stefanos Lysandrou
- Date of birth: 3 December 1949 (age 76)
- Place of birth: Lysi, Famagusta, Cyprus
- Position: Defender

Youth career
- 1963–1965: ASIL

Senior career*
Years	Team	Apps	(Gls)
1965–1971	ASIL		
1971–1984	Anorthosis Famagusta	384	(29)
Total		384	(29)

International career
1974–1982	Cyprus	20	(2)
- * Club domestic league appearances and goals

Stefanos Lysandrou (Greek: Στέφανος Λυσάνδρου; born 3 December 1949) is a Cypriot former footballer who played as a defender and made 20 appearances for the Cyprus national team.

== Club career ==
=== Early years ===
Stefanos was born in Lysi on 3 December 1949. He attended the Famagusta High School having as professor Antonis Papadopoulos. He began his career at ASIL in the season 1963-64 at the age of 13. At ASIL, he played continuously until 1971, playing a leading role in the team.

=== Club career ===
Lysandrou was a leading form of Anorthosis in the decades of 70s and 80s, in which he played for 13 years after having played for six years at ASIL Lysi. At the age of 35 he left the stadiums before playing again in his hometown club in order to help ASIL to stand up in the difficulties which faced. Stefanos was a respected football personality and a leading figure who dominated the defense. He was a central defensive player with powerful stakes, strong, with great jump and head but also a great distant ball, combined his passion, his soul and his football mind. He also had the gift of guiding the defensive line of the team. Furthermore, he considered a model of combat and valence, stable football value who won the affection and appreciation of the sporting world as a whole. In 1971, was made his transfer to Anorthosis, which offered a fair amount of money and several players in exchange for him to join Anorthosis. He only got one title with Anorthosis (Cypriot Cup 1975).

== International career ==
From 1974 until the end of his career he was a valuable unit of Cyprus national football team. Lysandrou made his debut for Cyprus on 15 November 1974 in a friendly match against Greece, which finished as a 1–3 loss. He went on to make 20 appearances, scoring 2 goals, before making his last appearance on 1 May 1982 in a UEFA Euro 1984 qualifying match against Romania, which finished as a 1-3 loss.

== Career statistics ==
=== International ===
Cyprus
Year	Apps	Goals
1974	1	0
1976	1	0
1978	3	1
1979	5	0
1980	5	0
1981	3	1
1982	2	0
Total	20	2

=== International goals ===
No.	Date	Venue	Opponent	Score	Result	Competition
1	15 November 1978	Makario Stadium, Nicosia, Cyprus	Saudi Arabia	1–0	2–0	Friendly
2	18 February 1981	Stade du Heysel, Brussels, Belgium	Belgium	2–1	2–3	1982 FIFA World Cup qualification

== Honours ==
Anorthosis Famagusta

- Cypriot Cup: 1974–75
