= Mats Nordgren =

Swedish footballer

Mats Göran Nordgren
Personal information
- Full name: Mats Nordgren
- Date of birth: 9 April 1955 (age 71)
- Place of birth: Kristianstad, Sweden
- Height: 1.77 m (5 ft 10 in)
- Position: Midfielder

Youth career
- 1970–1974: Vä IF

Senior career*
Years	Team	Apps	(Gls)
1975–1976	Hässleholms IF	20+	(4+)
1977–1982	Östers IF	121	(24)
1982–1984	Hessen Kassel	69	(8)
1984–1986	Östers IF	54	(7)
1987–1988	Mjällby AIF	13	(0)
1989	Vilans BoIF		
1990	Hanaskogs IS		
Total		277+	(43+)

International career
1978–1980	Sweden	19	(3)
- * Club domestic league appearances and goals

Mats Göran Nordgren (born 9 April 1955) is a Swedish former footballer who played as a midfielder and made 19 appearances for the Sweden national team.

== Career ==
Nordgren made his debut for Sweden on 1 September 1978 in a UEFA Euro 1980 qualifying match against France, in which he scored the opening goal for Sweden in the 2–2 draw. He went on to make 19 appearances, scoring 3 goals, before making his last appearance on 10 September 1980 in a 1982 FIFA World Cup qualification match against Scotland, which finished as a 0–1 loss.

== Career statistics ==
=== International ===
Appearances and goals by national team and year

Sweden
Year	Apps	Goals
1978	2	1
1979	10	0
1980	7	2
Total	19	3

International goals

No.	Date	Venue	Opponent	Score	Result	Competition
1	1 September 1978	Parc des Princes, Paris, France	France	1–0	2–2	UEFA Euro 1980 qualifying
2	29 April 1980	Malmö Stadion, Malmö, Sweden	Soviet Union	1–2	1–5	Friendly
3	22 May 1980	Olympic Stadium, Helsinki, Finland	Finland	1–0	2–0	1978–80 Nordic Football Championship
