= Marián Zeman =

Slovak footballer

Personal information
- Full name: Marián Zeman
- Date of birth: 7 July 1974 (age 52)
- Place of birth: Bratislava, Czechoslovakia
- Height: 1.90 m (6 ft 3 in)
- Position: Centre back

Senior career*
Years	Team	Apps	(Gls)
1992–1995	Slovan Bratislava	61	(4)
1995–1997	İstanbulspor	56	(2)
1997–2003	Vitesse Arnhem	61	(1)
1999–2000	→ Grasshopper Zürich (loan)	13	(1)
2001–2002	→ PAOK (loan)	4	(0)
2003–2004	Beira-Mar	24	(2)
Total		219	(10)

International career
1994–2003	Slovakia	27	(2)
- * Club domestic league appearances and goals

Marián Zeman (born 7 July 1974) is a Slovak former footballer who played at both professional and international levels as a central defender. Active at club level in Slovakia, Turkey, the Netherlands, Switzerland, Greece and Portugal, Zeman made over 200 career league appearances.

Post-retirement, Zeman features as an expert analyst and co-commentator for public broadcaster RTVS in their national team broadcasts and major tournaments such as UEFA Euro 2020.

== Career ==
Born in Bratislava, Zeman played professionally for Slovan Bratislava, İstanbulspor, Vitesse Arnhem, Grasshopper, PAOK and Beira-Mar.

He also earned 27 caps for the Slovak national side between 1994 and 2003, including five FIFA World Cup qualifying matches.

== Career statistics ==
=== International ===
Appearances and goals by national team and year
National team	Year	Apps	Goals
Slovakia	1994	3	0
Slovakia	1995	6	0
Slovakia	1996	5	2
Slovakia	1997	3	0
Slovakia	1998	2	0
Slovakia	1999	5	0
Slovakia	2000	–	
Slovakia	2001	–	
Slovakia	2002	1	0
Slovakia	2003	2	0
Total		27	2

Scores and results list Slovakia's goal tally first, score column indicates score after each Zeman goal.

List of international goals scored by Marián Zeman
No.	Date	Venue	Opponent	Score	Result	Competition
1	9 May 1996	Olympia, Helsingborg, Sweden	Sweden	1–1	1–2	Friendly
2	22 September 1996	Tehelné pole, Bratislava, Slovakia	Malta	3–0	6–0	1998 FIFA World Cup qualification
