= Hannu Rajaniemi (footballer) =

Finnish footballer (1953-2008)

Personal information
- Full name: Hannu Rajaniemi
- Date of birth: 15 September 1953
- Place of birth: Seinäjoki, Finland
- Date of death: 29 August 2008 (aged 54)
- Height: 1.72 m (5 ft 7 1/2 in)
- Position: Forward

Senior career*
Years	Team	Apps	(Gls)
1972–1977	SePS		
1977–1979	MP Mikkeli	44	(18)
1979–1984	Sepsi-78	127	(80)
1984–1988	Lapuan Virkiä		
1988-1989	TP-55 Seinäjoki	45	(0)

International career
1980–1981	Finland	7	(2)
- * Club domestic league appearances and goals

Hannu Rajaniemi (born 15 September 1953) is a Finnish former footballer. During his club career, Rajaniemi played for Sepsi-78, MP Mikkeli, Lapuan Virkiä and TP-55 Seinäjoki. He made 7 appearances for the Finland national football team from 1980 to 1981, scoring 2 goals.
