= Sven Dahlkvist =

Swedish footballer

Personal information
- Full name: Sven Anders Peter Dahlkvist
- Date of birth: 30 May 1955 (age 71)
- Place of birth: Mockfjärd, Sweden
- Height: 1.93 m (6 ft 4 in)
- Position: Centre back

Youth career
- 1963–1974: Gagnefs IF

Senior career*
Years	Team	Apps	(Gls)
1974–1987	AIK	256	(38)
1988–1992	Örebro SK	79	(8)
Total		335	(46)

International career
1979–1985	Sweden	39	(4)

Managerial career
- 1993–1999: Örebro SK
- 2001–2002: Eskilstuna City
- * Club domestic league appearances and goals

Sven Anders Peter "Dala" Dahlkvist (born 30 May 1955) is a Swedish former footballer who played as a centre back. He represented AIK and Örebro SK during a career that spanned between 1974 and 1992. A full international between 1979 and 1985, he won 39 caps and scored four goals for the Sweden national team.

In 1984, he was awarded Guldbollen as Sweden's best footballer of the year.

== Career ==
Sven was a successful forward and defender who began his career in Allsvenskan with AIK in 1974. He was a key player for the club until 1987. He then played for Örebro SK 1988–1992.

He played 39 games for the Swedish national team, scored four goals and won the Guldbollen in 1984.

After his playing career he has worked as a coach and club director for Örebro SK 1993–1999, then as a coach for Eskilstuna City FK.

== Personal life ==
His daughter Lisa Dahlkvist is a professional footballer who has played for Umeå IK and the Sweden women's national team.

== Career statistics ==
=== International ===
International goals

#	Date	Venue	Opponent	Score	Result	Competition
1.	21 February 1982	Lahden suurhalli, Lahti, Finland	Finland	2–1	Lost	Friendly
2.	16 November 1983	Queen's Park Oval, Port of Spain, Trinidad and Tobago	Trinidad and Tobago	0–5	Won	Friendly
3.	19 November 1983	Barbados National Stadium, Saint Michael, Barbados	Barbados	0–4	Won	Friendly
4.	23 February 1984	Tipshallen, Jönköping, Sweden	United States	4–0	Won	Friendly

== Honours ==
AIK

- Svenska Cupen: 1975–76, 1984–85

Individual

- Guldbollen: 1984
- Stor Grabb: 1983
