= Rainer Jarohs =

German footballer

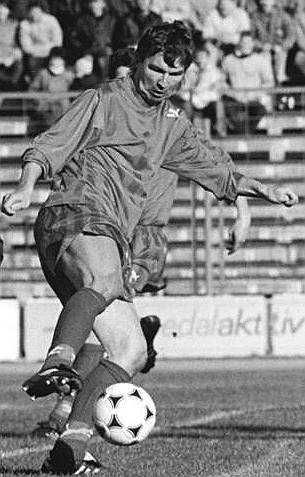

Personal information
- Date of birth: August 8, 1957 (age 69)
- Place of birth: Rostock, East Germany
- Position: Forward

Youth career
- 1965–1975: Hansa Rostock

Senior career*
Years	Team	Apps	(Gls)
1975–1990	Hansa Rostock	362	(166)

International career
1982	East Germany	3	(1)
- * Club domestic league appearances and goals

Rainer Jarohs (born August 8, 1957) is a German former footballer.

He played in the East German top-flight only for FC Hansa Rostock (259 matches, 76 goals).

In three full A internationals for East Germany he scored one goal.
