= Pasi Jaakonsaari =

Finnish footballer (born 1959)

Personal information
- Full name: Pasi Jaakonsaari
- Date of birth: 27 March 1959 (age 67)
- Place of birth: Riihimäki, Finland
- Height: 1.81 m (5 ft 11 1/2 in)
- Position: Midfielder

Senior career*
Years	Team	Apps	(Gls)
1976–1979	HIFK		
1979-1980	Grankulla IFK		
1980-1986	HJK Helsinki	41	(27)
1986-1988	Gefle IF	28	(3)
1988-1989	Vasalunds IF		
1989-1990	Geylang International FC		
1990-1993	HJK Helsinki	13	(0)
1993	FinnPa		

International career
1980-1982	Finland	11	(4)
- * Club domestic league appearances and goals

Pasi Jaakonsaari (born 27 March 1959) is a Finnish former footballer. During his club career, Jaakonsaari played for HIFK, Grankulla IFK, HJK Helsinki, Gefle IF, Vasalunds IF, Geylang International FC and FinnPa. He made 11 appearances for the Finland national football team between 1980 and 1982, scoring 4 goals.
