= Thomas Nilsson (footballer) =

Swedish footballer

Personal information
- Full name: Thomas Nilsson
- Date of birth: 2 August 1955 (age 71)
- Place of birth: Borlänge, Sweden
- Position: Forward

Senior career*
Years	Team	Apps	(Gls)
1975–1986	IK Brage	183	(85)
1986–1987	Karlstad BK	23	(8)
1987–1988	IK Brage	18	(0)

International career
1980–1982	Sweden	13	(1)
- * Club domestic league appearances and goals

Thomas Nilsson (born 2 August 1955) is a Swedish former football player.

During his club career, Sandberg played for IK Brage and Karlstad BK.

Sandberg made 13 appearances for the Sweden men's national football team from 1980 to 1982, scoring 1 goal.
