= Jan Svensson (footballer, born 1956) =

Swedish footballer

Personal information
- Full name: Jan Ingemar Svensson
- Date of birth: 24 April 1956 (age 70)
- Place of birth: Söderköping, Sweden
- Height: 1.77 m (5 ft 10 in)
- Position: Midfielder

Senior career*
Years	Team	Apps	(Gls)
1974–1976	IK Sleipner	22+	(8+)
1977–1983	IFK Norrköping	143	(35)
1983–1986	Eintracht Frankfurt	96	(16)
1986–1987	IFK Norrköping	41	(4)
1988–1990	FC Wettingen	78	(9)

International career
1979–1985	Sweden	26	(4)
- * Club domestic league appearances and goals

Jan Ingemar Svensson (born 24 April 1956) is a Swedish former footballer who played as a midfielder and made 26 appearances for the Sweden national team.

== Career ==
Svensson made his debut for Sweden on 5 September 1979 in a UEFA Euro 1980 qualifying match against France, which finished as a 1–3 loss. He went on to make 26 appearances, scoring 4 goals, before making his last appearance on 16 October 1985 in the 1–2 loss against Czechoslovakia.

== Career statistics ==
=== International ===
Appearances and goals by national team and year

National team	Year	Apps	Goals
Sweden	1979	5	3
Sweden	1980	1	0
Sweden	1981	5	1
Sweden	1982	8	0
Sweden	1984	1	0
Sweden	1985	6	0
Total		26	4

International goals

No.	Date	Venue	Opponent	Score	Result	Competition
1	10 October 1979	Sparta Stadium, Prague, Czechoslovakia	Czechoslovakia	1–3	1–4	UEFA Euro 1980 qualifying
2	17 November 1979	National Stadium, Kallang, Singapore	Singapore	2–0	5–0	Friendly
3	17 November 1979	National Stadium, Kallang, Singapore	Singapore	3–0	5–0	Friendly
4	24 June 1981	Råsunda Stadium, Stockholm, Sweden	Portugal	3–0	3–0	1982 FIFA World Cup qualification
