= Ladislav Vízek =

Czech footballer

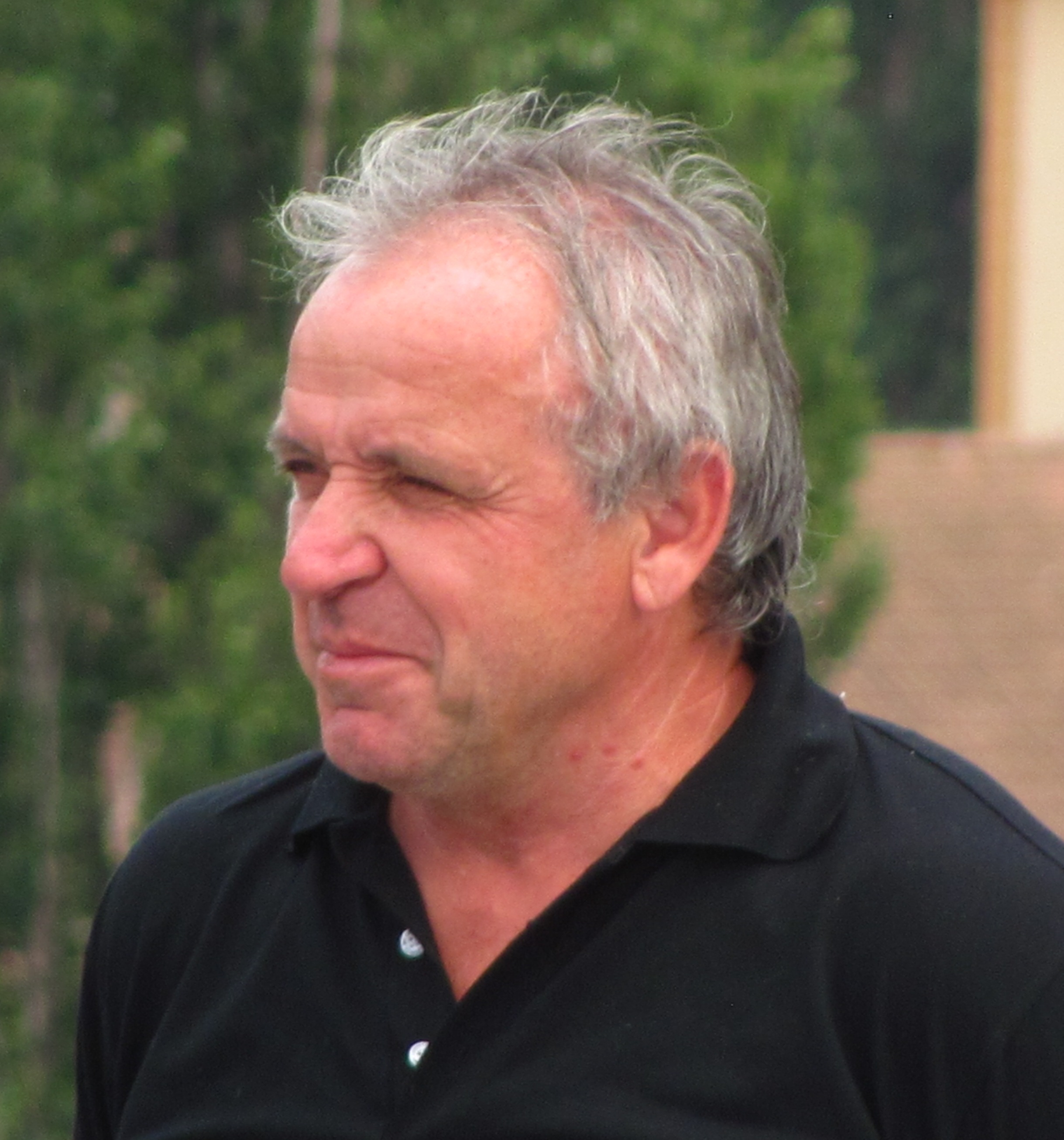

Personal information
- Date of birth: 22 January 1955 (age 71)
- Place of birth: Chlumec nad Cidlinou, Czechoslovakia
- Height: 1.76 m (5 ft 9 in)
- Position: Striker

Youth career
- TJ Čechie Hlušice
- Jiskra Nový Bydžov

Senior career*
Years	Team	Apps	(Gls)
1974–1975	Dukla Žatec		
1975–1985	Dukla Prague	321	(115)
1986–1988	Le Havre AC	61	(11)

International career
1977–1986	Czechoslovakia	55	(13)
- * Club domestic league appearances and goals

Olympic medal record

Representing Czechoslovakia

Men's Football
Gold medal – first place	1980 Moscow	Team competition

Ladislav Vízek (born 22 January 1955 in Chlumec nad Cidlinou) is a Czech football player. He played 55 matches for Czechoslovakia and scored 13 goals.

He played in the 1982 FIFA World Cup, and was sent off in Czechoslovakia's final game, a 1–1 draw with France in Valladolid.

He was a member of the gold Czechoslovakia team at the 1980 Olympic Games and the third-placed team at 1980 UEFA European Championship.

At club level, he played for Dukla Prague for many years.

== Trivia ==
Vízek's daughter Pavlína married another Czech football player, Vladimír Šmicer, in 1996.
