= Jukka Ikäläinen =

Finnish footballer (born 1957)

Personal information
- Full name: Jukka Ikäläinen
- Date of birth: 14 May 1957 (age 69)
- Place of birth: Söderhamn, Sweden
- Position: Midfielder

Senior career*
Years	Team	Apps	(Gls)
1976–1977	Kemin Into	?	(?)
1977–1981	GIF Sundsvall	97	(15)
1981–1985	Örgryte IS	81	(12)
1985–1988	Kemin Pallotoverit-85	68	(5)
1988–1991	Kiruna FF	69	(9)
1988–1991	Kemin Palloseura	48	(10)

International career
1980–1989	Finland	59	(3)

Managerial career
- 1994–1996: Finland
- 1998–1999: Finland U21
- 2000–2001: VPS
- 2002–2003: PS Kemi Kings
- 2004: Örgryte IS
- 2005: Örgryte IS (sporting director)
- 2006: RoPS
- 2009: PS Kemi Kings
- 2016: Finland (assistant)
- * Club domestic league appearances and goals

Jukka Ikäläinen (born 14 May 1957 in Söderhamn, Sweden) is a retired football midfielder.

During his club career, Ikäläinen played for Kemin Into, Örgryte IS, GIF Sundsvall, Kiruna FF and Kemin Palloseura. He also played international football for the Finland national team.

He was the Finnish Football Association footballer of the year in 1985.
