= Hasse Borg =

Swedish footballer (born 1953)

Personal information
- Full name: Hasse Kristian Borg
- Date of birth: 4 August 1953 (age 73)
- Place of birth: Örebro, Sweden
- Height: 1.85 m (6 ft 1 in)
- Position: Defender

Senior career*
Years	Team	Apps	(Gls)
1973	BK Forward		
1974–1976	Örebro SK	77	(6)
1977–1983	Eintracht Braunschweig	172	(9)
1983–1988	Malmö FF	92	(10)

International career
1976–1985	Sweden	49	(4)
- * Club domestic league appearances and goals

Hasse Kristian Borg (born 4 August 1953) is a Swedish former professional footballer who played as a defender. He played for Örebro SK, Eintracht Braunschweig and Malmö FF during a career that spanned between 1973 and 1988. A full international between 1976 and 1985, he won 49 caps and scored four goals for the Sweden national team and represented his country at the 1978 FIFA World Cup.

== Post-playing career ==
Borg was director of sports for Malmö FF between 1999 and 2009. He is now working for the club as a consultant.

== Career statistics ==
=== International ===
Appearances and goals by national team and year
National team	Year	Apps	Goals
Sweden	1976	5	0
Sweden	1977	6	0
Sweden	1978	10	1
Sweden	1979	9	2
Sweden	1980	6	0
Sweden	1981	6	1
Sweden	1982	3	0
Sweden	1983	–	
Sweden	1984	3	0
Sweden	1985	1	0
Total		49	4

Scores and results list Sweden's goal tally first, score column indicates score after each Borg goal.

List of international goals scored by Hasse Borg
No.	Date	Venue	Opponent	Score	Result	Competition
1	4 October 1978	Råsunda Stadium, Solna, Sweden	Czechoslovakia	1–0	1–3	UEFA Euro 1980 qualification
2	7 June 1979	Malmö Stadion, Malmö, Sweden	Luxembourg	3–0	3–0	UEFA Euro 1980 qualification
3	28 June 1979	Ullevi, Gothenburg, Sweden	Norway	1–0	2–0	1978–80 Nordic Football Championship
4	3 June 1981	Råsunda Stadium, Solna, Sweden	Northern Ireland	1–0	1–0	1982 FIFA World Cup qualification
