= Bo Börjesson =

Swedish footballer

Personal information
- Full name: Bo Börjesson
- Date of birth: 1 December 1949 (age 76)
- Place of birth: Alnö, Sweden
- Position: Midfielder

Senior career*
Years	Team	Apps	(Gls)
1971–1974	Örgryte IS	52	(5)
1974–1984	IFK Sundsvall		

International career
1976-81	Sweden	23	(5)
- * Club domestic league appearances and goals

Bo Börjesson (born 1 December 1949) is a Swedish former football player.

During his club career, Börjesson played for Örgryte IS and IFK Sundsvall.

Börjesson made 23 appearances for the Sweden men's national football team between 1976 and 1981, scoring 5 goals.
