= Sten-Ove Ramberg =

Swedish footballer and bandy player

Personal information
- Full name: Sten-Ove Wilhelm Ramberg
- Date of birth: 20 January 1955 (age 71)
- Place of birth: Stockholm, Sweden
- Position: Midfielder

Youth career
- Brommapojkarna

Senior career*
Years	Team	Apps	(Gls)
1973–1977	Brommapojkarna	119	(12)
1978–1989	Hammarby IF	250	(14)
Total		369	(26)

International career
1979–1984	Sweden	27	(3)
- * Club domestic league appearances and goals

Sten-Ove Wilhelm "Putte" Ramberg (born 20 November 1955) is a Swedish former footballer who played as a midfielder. He made 250 league appearances for Hammarby IF and scored 14 goals. He also made 27 appearances for the Swedish national side, scoring three times.

== Playing career ==
Being known as a technically gifted central midfielder, he started his career at IF Brommapojkarna in the lower divisions. Later he went on to play eleven years in Allsvenskan for Hammarby. He made 250 league appearances for Hammarby IF and scored 14 goals. Ramberg also made 27 appearances for the Swedish national side, scoring three times.

== Post-playing career ==
After ending his football career, Ramberg went on to work as an assistant manager at Brommapojkarna between 1993 and 1996. Since the beginning of the 2000s he has worked at the state owned gambling company Svenska Spel, managing their popular football product called "Stryktipset".

== Legacy ==
In 2004, Ramberg was voted as the seventh best player ever in Hammarby's history. In 2015, he also got inducted to the Hall of Fame at Brommapojkarna.

== Bandy career ==
Ramberg was also a gifted player in the sport of bandy, representing Hammarby IF Bandy whilst still being an active footballer. In 1978, he also earned two caps for the Swedish national bandy team.
