= Noel Brotherston =

Northern Irish footballer

Personal information
- Full name: Noel Brotherston
- Date of birth: 18 November 1956
- Place of birth: Dundonald, Northern Ireland
- Date of death: 6 May 1995 (aged 38)
- Place of death: Blackburn, England
- Height: 5 ft 7 in (1.70 m)
- Position: Winger

Senior career*
Years	Team	Apps	(Gls)
1974–1977	Tottenham Hotspur	1	(0)
1977–1987	Blackburn Rovers	317	(40)
1987–1989	Bury	38	(4)
1988	→ Scarborough (loan)	5	(0)
1989	Motala AIF		

International career
1978	Northern Ireland U21	1	(0)
1980–1985	Northern Ireland	27	(3)
- * Club domestic league appearances and goals

Noel Brotherston (18 November 1956 – 6 May 1995) was an international footballer for Northern Ireland.

== Club career ==
A winger, Brotherston played in the Football League for Tottenham, Blackburn Rovers, Bury, and Scarborough.

Noel was well remembered for his characteristic hairstyle that seemed to emphasise his jinking runs down the wing. He was a fans' favourite at Blackburn.

== International career ==
Brotherston made his debut for Northern Ireland in a May 1980 friendly match against Scotland and won 27 international caps, scoring three goals. He represented his country in three FIFA World Cup qualification matches and played at the 1982 World Cup.

Brotherston played in a famous 1–0 win for Northern Ireland over Israel that helped the team to qualify for the World Cup finals for the first time in 24 years. He also scored the winning goal against Wales in 1980 to give Northern Ireland the Home Internationals Championship trophy in the Irish Football Association's centenary year.

== Personal life ==
Brotherston grew up in the town of Dundonald, in the east of Belfast. He lived in Bright Street, East Belfast when he was a small boy.

He became a painter and decorator in Blackburn when he retired as a player, and had two sons, Lee and Ryan. He died of a heart attack aged just 38.
