= Thomas Larsson (footballer) =

Swedish footballer

Personal information
- Full name: Thomas Larsson
- Date of birth: 20 January 1955 (age 71)
- Place of birth: Norrköping, Sweden
- Position: Forward

Senior career*
Years	Team	Apps	(Gls)
1975–1982	Örgryte IS	150	(81)
1982-1985	OGC Nice	89	(36)
1985–1987	Örgryte IS	23	(4)
1987	Skövde AIK	7	(3)

International career
1981-1982	Sweden	10	(6)
- * Club domestic league appearances and goals

Thomas Larsson (born 20 January 1955) is a Swedish former football player.

During his club career, Sandberg played for Örgryte IS, OGC Nice and Skövde AIK.

Larsson made 10 appearances for the Sweden men's national football team between 1981 and 1982, scoring 6 goals.
