= Tony Persson =

Swedish footballer

Personal information
- Full name: Tony Persson
- Date of birth: 10 June 1959 (age 67)
- Place of birth: Sweden
- Position: Midfielder

Senior career*
Years	Team	Apps	(Gls)
1979–1986	Kalmar FF	113	(9)
1986-1989	GAIS	68	(12)

International career
1981-1982	Sweden	12	(2)
- * Club domestic league appearances and goals

Tony Persson (born 10 June 1959) is a Swedish former football player.

During his club career, Persson played for Kalmar FF and GAIS.

Persson made 12 appearances for the Sweden men's national football team between 1981 and 1982, scoring 2 goals.
