= 1986 FIFA World Cup qualification (UEFA) =

Tournament details
- Teams: 32 (from 1 confederation)

Tournament statistics
- Top scorer: (Denmark) Preben Elkjær (8 goals)

Listed below are the dates and results for the 1986 FIFA World Cup qualification rounds for the European zone (UEFA). For an overview of the qualification rounds, see the article 1986 FIFA World Cup qualification.

UEFA was allocated thirteen qualifying berths for the 1986 FIFA World Cup, and one place in a play-off, however Italy were the defending champions and qualified automatically, leaving 12.5 spots open for competition between 32 teams.

Europe's automatic qualifying berths were taken by Poland, West Germany, Portugal, England, Northern Ireland, France, Bulgaria, Hungary, Denmark, Soviet Union and Spain. Belgium and Scotland qualified through the UEFA play-off and UEFA–OFC intercontinental play-off respectively.

== Format ==
The 32 teams were divided into 7 groups. The teams would play against each other on a home-and-away basis. The number of teams and spots for each group were as follows:

- Groups 2, 3, 4 and 6 had 5 teams each. The group winners and runners-up would qualify.
- Groups 1, 5 and 7 had 4 teams each. The group winners would qualify. The runners-up of Groups 1 and 5 would advance to the UEFA Play-offs, while the runner-up of Group 7 would advance to the UEFA / OFC Intercontinental Play-off. In the play-offs, the 2 teams would play against each other on a home-and-away basis, with the winner qualifying.
  (Originally the runners-up of Groups 1, 5 and 7 would play against each other on a home-and-away basis. The winner of this play-off group would qualify, while the runner-up would advance to the UEFA / OFC Intercontinental Play-off. At request of among others the Dutch FA and Belgian FA this format was simplified.)

== Group play ==
The draw for the qualifying groups took place in Zürich, Switzerland on 7 December 1983. During the draw teams were drawn from the 5 pots into the 7 groups. The seedings below were announced ten days before the draw.

Pot A	Pot B	Pot C	Pot D	Pot E
West Germany; Poland; France; England; Soviet Union; Austria; Spain	Northern Ireland; Belgium; Hungary; Scotland; Yugoslavia; Czechoslovakia; Denmark	Republic of Ireland; Wales; Netherlands; Romania; Sweden; East Germany; Greece	Bulgaria; Portugal; Switzerland; Iceland; Albania; Turkey; Cyprus	Norway; Finland; Malta; Luxembourg

=== Summary ===
Group winners and the runners-up from the five-team groups qualified directly for the 1986 FIFA World Cup
Runners-up advanced to the play-offs
Runner-up advanced to the intercontinental play-off
Other teams were eliminated

Group 1	Group 2	Group 3	Group 4	Group 5	Group 6	Group 7
Poland	West Germany	England	France	Hungary	Denmark	Spain
Belgium	Portugal	Northern Ireland	Bulgaria	Netherlands	Soviet Union	Scotland
Albania Greece	Sweden Czechoslovakia Malta	Romania Finland Turkey	East Germany Yugoslavia Luxembourg	Austria Cyprus	Switzerland Republic of Ireland Norway	Wales Iceland

=== Group 1 ===
Pos	Team	Pld	W	D	L	GF	GA	GD	Pts	Qualification	Poland national football team	Belgium national football team	Albania national football team	Greece national football team
1	Poland	6	3	2	1	10	6	+4	8	Qualification to 1986 FIFA World Cup	—	0–0	2–2	3–1
2	Belgium	6	3	2	1	7	3	+4	8	Advance to UEFA play-off	2–0	—	3–1	2–0
3	Albania	6	1	2	3	6	9	−3	4		0–1	2–0	—	1–1
4	Greece	6	1	2	3	5	10	−5	4		1–4	0–0	2–0	—

=== Group 2 ===
Pos	Team	Pld	W	D	L	GF	GA	GD	Pts	Qualification	Germany national football team	Portugal national football team	Sweden men's national football team	Czechoslovakia national football team	Malta national football team
1	West Germany	8	5	2	1	22	9	+13	12	Qualification to 1986 FIFA World Cup	—	0–1	2–0	2–2	6–0
2	Portugal	8	5	0	3	12	10	+2	10	Qualification to 1986 FIFA World Cup	1–2	—	1–3	2–1	3–2
3	Sweden	8	4	1	3	14	9	+5	9		2–2	0–1	—	2–0	4–0
4	Czechoslovakia	8	3	2	3	11	12	−1	8		1–5	1–0	2–1	—	4–0
5	Malta	8	0	1	7	6	25	−19	1		2–3	1–3	1–2	0–0	—

=== Group 3 ===
Pos	Team	Pld	W	D	L	GF	GA	GD	Pts	Qualification	England national football team	Northern Ireland national football team	Romania national football team	Finland national football team	Turkey national football team
1	England	8	4	4	0	21	2	+19	12	Qualification to 1986 FIFA World Cup	—	0–0	1–1	5–0	5–0
2	Northern Ireland	8	4	2	2	8	5	+3	10	Qualification to 1986 FIFA World Cup	0–1	—	3–2	2–1	2–0
3	Romania	8	3	3	2	12	7	+5	9		0–0	0–1	—	2–0	3–0
4	Finland	8	3	2	3	7	12	−5	8		1–1	1–0	1–1	—	1–0
5	Turkey	8	0	1	7	2	24	−22	1		0–8	0–0	1–3	1–2	—

=== Group 4 ===
Pos	Team	Pld	W	D	L	GF	GA	GD	Pts	Qualification	France national football team	Bulgaria national football team	East Germany national football team	Yugoslavia national football team	Luxembourg national football team
1	France	8	5	1	2	15	4	+11	11	Qualification to 1986 FIFA World Cup	—	1–0	2–0	2–0	6–0
2	Bulgaria	8	5	1	2	13	5	+8	11	Qualification to 1986 FIFA World Cup	2–0	—	1–0	2–1	4–0
3	East Germany	8	5	0	3	16	9	+7	10		2–0	2–1	—	2–3	3–1
4	Yugoslavia	8	3	2	3	7	8	−1	8		0–0	0–0	1–2	—	1–0
5	Luxembourg	8	0	0	8	2	27	−25	0		0–4	1–3	0–5	0–1	—

=== Group 5 ===
Pos	Team	Pld	W	D	L	GF	GA	GD	Pts	Qualification	Hungary national football team	Netherlands national football team	Austria national football team	Cyprus national football team
1	Hungary	6	5	0	1	12	4	+8	10	Qualification to 1986 FIFA World Cup	—	0–1	3–1	2–0
2	Netherlands	6	3	1	2	11	5	+6	7	Advance to UEFA play-off	1–2	—	1–1	7–1
3	Austria	6	3	1	2	9	8	+1	7		0–3	1–0	—	4–0
4	Cyprus	6	0	0	6	3	18	−15	0		1–2	0–1	1–2	—

=== Group 6 ===
Pos	Team	Pld	W	D	L	GF	GA	GD	Pts	Qualification	Denmark national football team	Soviet Union national football team	Switzerland national football team	Republic of Ireland national football team	Norway national football team
1	Denmark	8	5	1	2	17	6	+11	11	Qualification to 1986 FIFA World Cup	—	4–2	0–0	3–0	1–0
2	Soviet Union	8	4	2	2	13	8	+5	10	Qualification to 1986 FIFA World Cup	1–0	—	4–0	2–0	1–0
3	Switzerland	8	2	4	2	5	10	−5	8		1–0	2–2	—	0–0	1–1
4	Republic of Ireland	8	2	2	4	5	10	−5	6		1–4	1–0	3–0	—	0–0
5	Norway	8	1	3	4	4	10	−6	5		1–5	1–1	0–1	1–0	—

=== Group 7 ===
Pos	Team	Pld	W	D	L	GF	GA	GD	Pts	Qualification	Spain national football team	Scotland national football team	Wales national football team	Iceland national football team
1	Spain	6	4	0	2	9	8	+1	8	Qualification to 1986 FIFA World Cup	—	1–0	3–0	2–1
2	Scotland	6	3	1	2	8	4	+4	7	Advance to UEFA–OFC play-off	3–1	—	0–1	3–0
3	Wales	6	3	1	2	7	6	+1	7		3–0	1–1	—	2–1
4	Iceland	6	1	0	5	4	10	−6	2		1–2	0–1	1–0	—

== UEFA play-off ==
16 October 1985

Belgium	1–0	Netherlands
Vercauteren 20'	Report

Constant Vanden Stock Stadium, Brussels, Belgium
Attendance: 30,764
Referee: Pietro D'Elia (Italy)
20 November 1985

Netherlands	2–1	Belgium
Houtman 60'; De Wit 72'	Report	Grün 85'

De Kuip, Rotterdam, Netherlands
Attendance: 48,962
Referee: George Courtney (England)

2–2 on aggregate; Belgium won on away goals.

== Inter-confederation play-offs ==
Team 1	Agg.	Team 2	1st leg	2nd leg
Scotland	2–0	Australia	2–0	0–0

== Goalscorers ==
8 goals

- (Denmark) Preben Elkjær

6 goals

- (East Germany) Rainer Ernst

5 goals

- (England) Bryan Robson
- (Portugal) Fernando Gomes
- (Soviet Union) Oleh Protasov

4 goals

- (Denmark) Michael Laudrup
- (East Germany) Ralf Minge
- (England) Mark Hateley
- (France) Michel Platini
- (Netherlands) Wim Kieft
- (Romania) Gheorghe Hagi
- (Sweden) Robert Prytz
- (West Germany) Karl-Heinz Rummenigge

3 goals

- (Albania) Bedri Omuri
- (Austria) Walter Schachner
- (Belgium) Franky Vercauteren
- (Bulgaria) Georgi Dimitrov
- (Czechoslovakia) Petr Janečka
- (England) Gary Lineker
- (England) Tony Woodcock
- (Finland) Mika Lipponen
- (France) Dominique Rocheteau
- (France) Yannick Stopyra
- (Northern Ireland) Norman Whiteside
- (Poland) Dariusz Dziekanowski
- (Poland) Włodzimierz Smolarek
- (Portugal) Carlos Manuel
- (Romania) Rodion Cămătaru
- (Soviet Union) Georgi Kondratiev
- (Sweden) Dan Corneliusson
- (Wales) Mark Hughes
- (Wales) Ian Rush
- (West Germany) Klaus Allofs
- (West Germany) Pierre Littbarski
- (West Germany) Uwe Rahn

2 goals

- (Belgium) Enzo Scifo
- (Bulgaria) Plamen Getov
- (Bulgaria) Stoycho Mladenov
- (Bulgaria) Nasko Sirakov
- (Denmark) Klaus Berggreen
- (Denmark) Søren Lerby
- (East Germany) Andreas Thom
- (England) John Barnes
- (Finland) Jari Rantanen
- (Hungary) Lajos Détári
- (Hungary) Márton Esterházy
- (Hungary) József Kiprich
- (Hungary) Tibor Nyilasi
- (Republic of Ireland) Frank Stapleton
- (Luxembourg) Robby Langers
- (Malta) Leonard Farrugia
- (Netherlands) Peter Houtman
- (Netherlands) Dick Schoenaker
- (Netherlands) Rob de Wit
- (Norway) Tom Sundby
- (Poland) Zbigniew Boniek
- (Portugal) Diamantino Miranda
- (Scotland) Davie Cooper
- (Scotland) Mo Johnston
- (Scotland) Paul McStay
- (Spain) Hipólito Rincón
- (Sweden) Thomas Sunesson
- (Switzerland) André Egli
- (West Germany) Matthias Herget
- (West Germany) Rudi Völler
- (Socialist Federal Republic of Yugoslavia) Fadil Vokrri

1 goal

- (Albania) Mirel Josa
- (Albania) Agustin Kola
- (Albania) Arben Minga
- (Austria) Martin Gisinger
- (Austria) Peter Hrstic
- (Austria) Toni Polster
- (Austria) Herbert Prohaska
- (Austria) Gerald Willfurth
- (Belgium) Nico Claesen
- (Belgium) Georges Grün
- (Belgium) Erwin Vandenbergh
- (Belgium) Eddy Voordeckers
- (Bulgaria) Rusi Gochev
- (Bulgaria) Kostadin Kostadinov
- (Bulgaria) Boycho Velitchkov
- (Cyprus) Paschalis Christophorou
- (Cyprus) Kostas Foti
- (Cyprus) Panayiotis Marangos
- (Czechoslovakia) Jan Berger
- (Czechoslovakia) Stanislav Griga
- (Czechoslovakia) Vladimír Hruška
- (Czechoslovakia) Karel Jarolím
- (Czechoslovakia) Vladislav Lauda
- (Czechoslovakia) Josef Novák
- (Czechoslovakia) Ladislav Vízek
- (Denmark) John Sivebæk
- (East Germany) Michael Glowatzky
- (East Germany) Ronald Kreer
- (East Germany) Matthias Liebers
- (East Germany) Uwe Zötzsche
- (England) Viv Anderson
- (England) Glenn Hoddle
- (England) Kenny Sansom
- (England) Chris Waddle
- (Finland) Ari Hjelm
- (Finland) Ari Valvee
- (France) Philippe Anziani
- (France) Patrick Battiston
- (France) Luis Fernández
- (France) Alain Giresse
- (France) José Touré
- (Greece) Nikos Anastopoulos
- (Greece) Kostas Antoniou
- (Greece) Tasos Mitropoulos
- (Greece) Dimitris Saravakos
- (Greece) Georgios Skartados
- (Hungary) József Kardos
- (Hungary) Antal Nagy
- (Hungary) Antal Róth
- (Hungary) László Szokolai
- (Iceland) Magnús Bergs
- (Iceland) Pétur Pétursson
- (Iceland) Guðmundur Þorbjörnsson
- (Iceland) Teitur Þórðarson
- (Republic of Ireland) Tony Grealish
- (Republic of Ireland) Kevin Sheedy
- (Republic of Ireland) Mickey Walsh
- (Malta) Carmel Busuttil
- (Malta) Michael Degiorgio
- (Malta) Raymond Xuereb
- (Netherlands) Erwin Koeman
- (Netherlands) Marco van Basten
- (Northern Ireland) Gerry Armstrong
- (Northern Ireland) John O'Neill
- (Northern Ireland) Martin O'Neill
- (Northern Ireland) Jimmy Quinn
- (Norway) Pål Jacobsen
- (Norway) Hallvar Thoresen
- (Poland) Marek Ostrowski
- (Poland) Andrzej Pałasz
- (Portugal) Rui Jordão
- (Portugal) José Rafael
- (Romania) Marcel Coraș
- (Romania) Ion Geolgău
- (Romania) Gino Iorgulescu
- (Romania) Ștefan Iovan
- (Romania) Dorin Mateuț
- (Scotland) Jim Bett
- (Scotland) Kenny Dalglish
- (Scotland) Frank McAvennie
- (Scotland) Charlie Nicholas
- (Soviet Union) Fyodor Cherenkov
- (Soviet Union) Anatoliy Demyanenko
- (Soviet Union) Yuri Gavrilov
- (Soviet Union) Sergey Gotsmanov
- (Soviet Union) Hennadiy Lytovchenko
- (Spain) Emilio Butragueño
- (Spain) Francisco José Carrasco
- (Spain) Paco Clos
- (Spain) Andoni Goicoechea
- (Spain) Rafael Gordillo
- (Spain) Marcos Alonso Peña
- (Spain) Manuel Sarabia
- (Sweden) Ingemar Erlandsson
- (Sweden) Lars Larsson
- (Sweden) Mats Magnusson
- (Sweden) Torbjörn Nilsson
- (Sweden) Glenn Strömberg
- (Switzerland) Umberto Barberis
- (Switzerland) Jean-Paul Brigger
- (Switzerland) Christian Matthey
- (Turkey) Metin Tekin
- (Turkey) İlyas Tüfekçi
- (Wales) Mickey Thomas
- (West Germany) Thomas Berthold
- (West Germany) Andreas Brehme
- (West Germany) Karlheinz Förster
- (West Germany) Felix Magath
- (West Germany) Lothar Matthäus
- (Socialist Federal Republic of Yugoslavia) Mehmed Baždarević
- (Socialist Federal Republic of Yugoslavia) Milko Djurovski
- (Socialist Federal Republic of Yugoslavia) Ivan Gudelj
- (Socialist Federal Republic of Yugoslavia) Miloš Šestić
- (Socialist Federal Republic of Yugoslavia) Haris Škoro

1 own goal

- (Cyprus) Nikos Pantziaras (playing against the Netherlands)
- (Luxembourg) Guy Hellers (playing against Bulgaria)
- (Netherlands) Michel Valke (playing against Austria)
- (Portugal) Frederico Rosa (playing against Malta)
- (Romania) Gino Iorgulescu (playing against Northern Ireland)
- (Sweden) Andreas Ravelli (playing against Czechoslovakia)
