= 1985 Wales v Scotland football match =

Association football match

1986 FIFA World Cup qualification
- Event: 1986 FIFA World Cup qualification – UEFA Group 7
Wales	Scotland
(Wales)	(Scotland)
1	1
- Date: 10 September 1985
- Venue: Ninian Park, Cardiff
- Referee: Jan Keizer (Netherlands)
- Attendance: 34,247

On 10 September 1985, the Welsh and Scottish national teams played each other during the qualifying stages of the 1986 FIFA World Cup at Ninian Park, the home of Cardiff City. The game was both teams' final match of the qualifying tournament, and both were still able to gain a place at the finals in Mexico; Wales needed to win the game, while Scotland knew that a draw would be enough.

The game was played against the backdrop of escalating football hooliganism; English clubs had been banned from European competition as a result of the Heysel Stadium disaster over three months prior, and fears were being raised, notably by Scotland's manager Jock Stein, that the British government, led by Margaret Thatcher, was seeking to lead a "crackdown" on football supporters generally, and that trouble at the highly charged game at Ninian Park would give them an excuse to extend this from just England to the other Home Nations.

Despite Scotland having the advantage in the group, thanks to a superior goal difference, they went into the game as underdogs due to some of their senior players being unavailable due to either injury or suspension, and because they had lost to Wales in the return fixture at Hampden Park in Glasgow the previous March. Despite this, Scotland achieved the draw they needed to go to the next stage of qualifying, while at the same time virtually eliminating Wales from the competition.

Scotland's celebrations at gaining the point they needed from the game were marred by Stein's collapse moments before the final whistle, and his subsequent death in the stadium's treatment room.

== Background ==
=== Home Internationals ===
Map of the Home Nations.

The four Home Nations of the United Kingdom (England, Scotland, Wales and Northern Ireland (Note: Ireland until 1955.)) had played regular international football matches against each other since 1872, when the first such game between England and Scotland was played. Initially, these were simply exhibition games, with only sporting and national pride being played for. (Note: Exhibition games are generally referred to as "friendlies".) As time went on, and a full fixture list between all four teams was established, discussion about a championship began, with points awarded for wins and draws, and a league table to determine a champion. This ultimately evolved into what became the British Home Championship, which was regularly played towards the end of the season. Into the 20th century, the tournament, which was the oldest international football competition, gained in prestige – the first list of "International Champions" was published in 1908, while a trophy was first awarded in 1935. As international football expanded, and new tournaments were established, such as the World Cup and European Championships, the prestige of the tournament began to wane.

The British Home Championship had ended in the 1983–84 season, with England having announced their decision to withdraw from the competition on 19 August 1983, citing an increasingly congested international fixture list and waning interest from supporters, especially for the games against Wales and Northern Ireland. Although Scotland said nothing publicly about also pulling out, it was accepted that, if any of the four withdrew from the competition, that would bring it to an end. Despite the withdrawal of England from the Home Championship, the annual England vs Scotland game would continue, with the two playing for a new trophy, the Rous Cup.

The Home Internationals had been a fixture in the calendar for 100 years, with the British Home Championship played every year (outside of the two World Wars) since the 1883–84 season. As a result, there was some level of disappointment felt by Wales and Northern Ireland over the decision. As a way of retaining the tournament, Alun Evans, the Secretary of the Football Association of Wales (FAW), had proposed making it biennial instead of annual, with the top two contesting a final game. In his programme notes for the first game of the 1984 tournament, Harry Cavan, the president of the Irish Football Association, said "We are gravely disappointed and sad that 100 years of genuine friendship, sporting traditions and close co-operation seems to have been sacrificed for financial expediency."

At the draw for the qualifying competition for the 1986 World Cup, which took place in Zürich on 7 December 1983 (six days before Harry Cavan's words were published), the four Home Nations were drawn against each other, with England and Northern Ireland in Group 3, and Scotland and Wales in Group 7.

=== World Cup qualification ===
Scotland and Wales, having been drawn together in the same qualifying group for the 1986 World Cup, had been evenly matched throughout the competition, although Wales had secured a 1–0 win over Scotland in what turned out to be a controversial and bad-tempered game at Hampden Park in March 1985. This game, Wales' first win at Hampden for 34 years, saw Scottish complaints over what appeared to be a foul by Welsh striker Mark Hughes on defender Alex McLeish in the buildup to the goal scored by Ian Rush. A clash between Scotland captain Graeme Souness and Welsh midfielder Peter Nicholas, for which both were booked, led to some of the Welsh team surrounding the Scottish player.

27 March 1985
20.00 GMT

Scotland	0–1	Wales
	Report	Rush 37'

Hampden Park, Glasgow
Attendance: 62,444
Referee: Alexis Ponnet (Belgium)

The booking that Souness received would prove expensive as he was subsequently booked in Scotland's next qualifying game against Iceland. This led to his receiving a suspension for the final qualifying game away to Wales. Going into the final round of games, both teams were equal on points with Spain, with Scotland ahead thanks to a superior goal difference; Spain's final game at home to Iceland was scheduled to be played two weeks after Wales and Scotland had played each other. With this in mind, a draw for Scotland would be sufficient to virtually guarantee second place in Group 7 and advance at the very least through to the two legged play-off against the winner of the Oceania qualifying tournament, while a win would likely see them top the group and qualify automatically. For Wales, anything less than a win would end their hopes of qualification unless Spain failed to beat Iceland.

Group 7 table prior to Wales v Scotland

Team	Pld	W	D	L	GF	GA	GD	Pts
Scotland	5	3	0	2	7	3	+4	6
Wales	5	3	0	2	6	5	+1	6
Spain	5	3	0	2	6	7	-1	6
Iceland	5	1	0	4	3	8	–5	2

The matchup was similar to the qualification for the 1978 World Cup, when Scotland and Wales were drawn together in the same group. On that occasion, the two played each other in the penultimate group game at Anfield, with Scotland knowing a point would be enough to guarantee qualification for the final tournament in Argentina, while Wales needed a victory to maintain their chance of qualifying going into their final game. In the event, a controversial penalty from Don Masson and a late header by Kenny Dalglish gave Scotland the victory.

=== Head-to-head ===
The World Cup qualifier between Wales and Scotland at Ninian Park was the 101st meeting between the two since 1876, encompassing games in the British Home Championship, World Cup and friendlies. Wales had a poor record against Scotland having won only 18 games up to that point, with Scotland successful in 60. The two teams had played each other 22 times at Ninian Park; Scotland had a 9–6 advantage over Wales, with the remaining seven games drawn.

	Wales	Draw	Scotland
British Home Championship	16	22	50
FIFA World Cup	1	0	2
Friendly	1	0	8
Total	18	22	60
At Ninian Park
	6	7	9

== Build-up ==
=== Recent results ===
The game would be the first of the 1985–86 season for both teams. Since the first fixture at Hampden Park on 27 March, both teams had played twice, with each playing one of the other teams in the qualifying group and a friendly. Wales had secured a comfortable home win against Spain in the World Cup qualifying tournament, but had gone down to defeat away to Norway. Scotland went into the match on the back of a pair of wins; the Rous Cup victory against England, and the World Cup qualifier away to Iceland.

Previous Scotland results 1985
Date	Venue	Opponents	Attendance	Score (Note: Scotland score first)	Competition	Scotland scorers
25 May 1985	Hampden Park, Glasgow (H)	England	66,489	1–0	Rous Cup	Gough
28 May 1985	Laugardalsvöllur, Reykjavík (A)	Iceland	16,000	1–0	WCQ7	Bett

Previous Wales results 1985
Date	Venue	Opponents	Attendance	Score (Note: Wales score first)	Competition	Wales scorers
30 April 1985	Racecourse Ground, Wrexham (H)	Spain	23,494	3–0	WCQ7	Rush (2), Hughes
5 June 1985	Brann Stadion, Bergen (A)	Norway	5,596	2–4	Friendly	Lovell, Hughes

=== Choice of venue ===
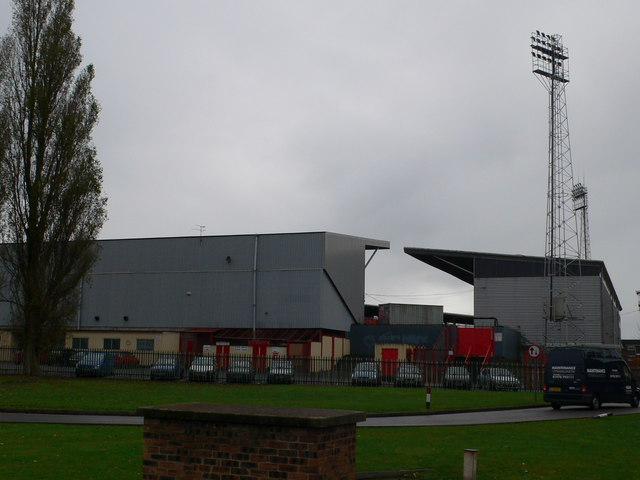
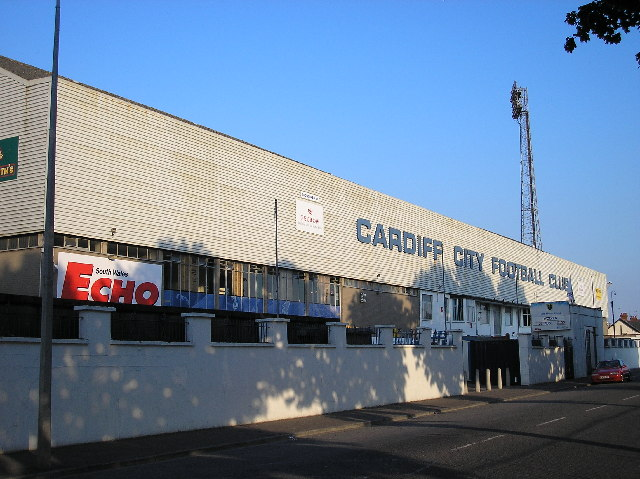
Despite Wales having an exceptional recent record at Wrexham's Racecourse Ground (left), the FAW decided to take advantage of the larger capacity offered by Ninian Park in Cardiff (right).

In 1985, the FAW did not have access to a large national stadium. The National Stadium at Cardiff Arms Park had opened the previous year, but was then for the exclusive use of the Welsh Rugby Union; there was no football game played there until 1989. The FAW instead took the national team to one of the stadia of Cardiff City, Swansea City or Wrexham, three of the four clubs who then played in the English football league system. (Note: Somerton Park, the home of Newport County, was never used for international football.)

In the buildup to the game, the Welsh manager Mike England was unhappy that the game was to be played at Ninian Park in Cardiff instead of the Racecourse Ground in Wrexham. Wales at the time had an excellent record at the Racecourse, both in qualifying tournaments for the World Cup and European Championships, and in the British Home Championship. During the early 1970s, Wrexham had embarked on making significant improvements to the Racecourse, with two new stands built and a new roof installed over the Kop End. Ninian Park had undergone a cut to its capacity, as a result of various safety inspections, until improvements were made. The smaller capacity of the Racecourse meant that home games were more likely to sell out. This had led to the FAW choosing the Racecourse for the majority of the national team's home games from 1977 onwards. Before the game against Scotland, Wales had played twenty home games since the beginning of 1980, with eight each of those played at Cardiff and Wrexham. Of those, Wales had won 6 and drawn 2, including two wins against England, and the 3–0 victory over Spain earlier in the qualifying tournament at the Racecourse, while they had won 3, drawn 2 and lost 3 at Ninian Park. In spite of Wales' exceptional record at the Racecourse, the level of interest in the game from supporters led to the FAW to name the larger Ninian Park as the venue.

Welsh home record January 1977 – June 1985					Welsh stadium capacity		
	Overall record	Ninian Park (Cardiff)	Racecourse Ground (Wrexham)	Vetch Field (Swansea)	Stadium	Total	Seats
Played	31 (Note: Includes 1978 World Cup Qualifier against Scotland played at Anfield.)	10	15	5	Ninian Park	43,000	7,040
Won	17	4	10	3	Racecourse Ground	28,500	7,000
Drawn	8	2	4	2	Vetch Field	26,490	5,300
Lost	6	4	1	0			
Win % (overall)	54.83%	12.9%	32.26%	9.68%			

=== Pressure on Jock Stein ===
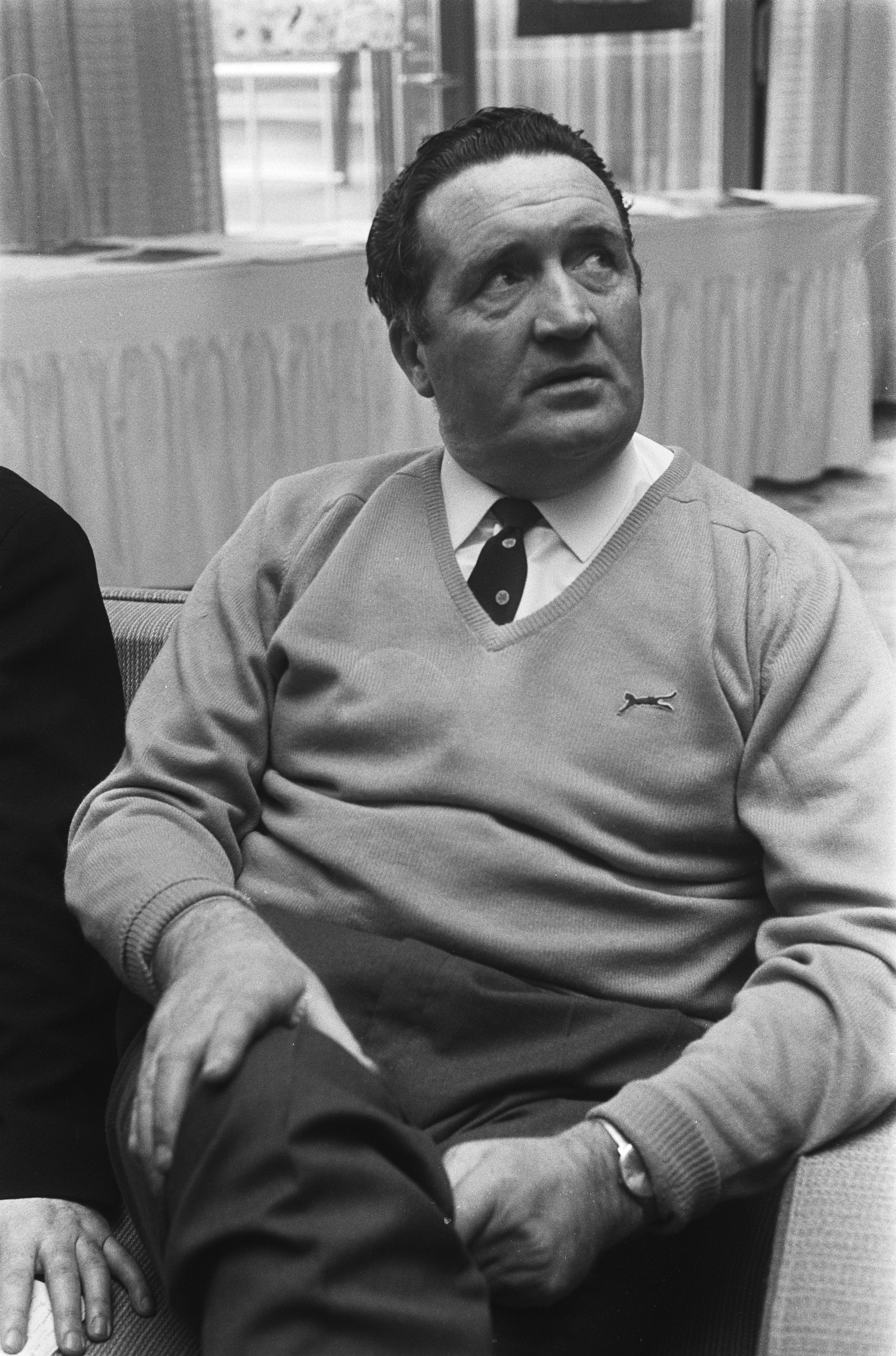
Jock Stein was under significant pressure, and indicated he would step down as Scotland manager after the 1986 World Cup.

Jock Stein had been the manager of Scotland since the resignation of Ally MacLeod in 1978, and had ensured qualification for the 1982 World Cup in Spain. Over the period there had been little other success, either in the European Championships, which Scotland had failed to qualify for twice, or the British Home Championship, which had led to criticism leading into the next competition, the 1986 World Cup. As a consequence, Stein was facing significant pressure to ensure qualification for his team for the tournament, given the route that had been provided to Scotland by the qualifying draw. Group 7 was one of three UEFA qualifying groups with only four teams – in each of these groups, the second placed teams would advance to a play-off round. For the second placed team in Group 7, this meant a two-legged play-off against the winner of the OFC tournament, likely to be Australia, which was seen as a much easier proposition than the runners up in Group 1 and Group 5, who would have to face each other. As a consequence, the defeat to Wales in Glasgow had led to significant criticism directed at Stein, who was aware that failure to get a result in the return game against Wales would likely cost him his job.

Stein was not helped by the fact that several of his senior players, including Graeme Souness (his captain), Kenny Dalglish, Alan Hansen and Steve Archibald would all miss the game through injury or suspension. Stein was also taking diuretics to manage heart failure at the time but had, in the build-up to the game, decided to stop taking them to try and remain focused and negate any potential side-effects the medication might have. Despite his enthusiasm for the job and for football, the strain on Stein, combined with his poor health, had led to him indicating that he would step down after the World Cup finals in Mexico.

=== Potential for government intervention ===
English football had gone through some serious incidents related to football hooliganism in 1985. In March, a major riot had occurred during an FA Cup tie between Luton Town and Millwall; on the final day of the English domestic season, the Second Division game between Birmingham City and Leeds United was marred by the death of a 14-year-old Birmingham fan during rioting before the game; while just two days after Scotland's qualifying game in Iceland, the Heysel Stadium disaster had occurred prior to the 1985 European Cup Final, which had led to English clubs being banned from European competition by UEFA. (Note: The disaster at the Heysel Stadium in Brussels saw 39 fans of Italian club Juventus killed and 600 injured as a result of the collapse of a wall following an attack by rival fans of Liverpool in the minutes leading up to the start of the 1985 European Cup Final between the two teams. Following the disaster, English clubs were banned from European competition until 1990.)

The action taken by UEFA had no effect on England's participation in international football, although there were discussions over their participation in the 1988 European Championships, nor did it have any implication for either the Scottish Football Association (SFA) or FAW over their clubs' participation in European competition. There were fears, voiced by Jock Stein among others, that any trouble at the game in Cardiff could provide an excuse for the UK government, under prime minister Margaret Thatcher, to extend the measures it was putting in place in England to crack down on football hooliganism to Scotland and Wales as well. (Note: UK wide action by government was not unprecedented; as a result of Heysel, the Belgian government banned football teams from the whole of the United Kingdom on 1 June 1985, with the ban only lifted in December 1986.)

=== Television broadcast ===
The importance of the match meant it was selected for live broadcast by ITV across their entire network, with on-site presentation by Jim Rosenthal, by then one of ITV Sport's main presenters, who shared the studio with Jimmy Greaves. Two separate commentary teams were used: one, consisting of ITV's senior commentator Brian Moore, Terry Yorath and Ian St. John, covered the game for the English and Welsh regions of the network, while the other, with Jock Brown and Joe Jordan, was for viewers in the Scottish ITV areas.

=== Referee ===
Dutch referee Jan Keizer was chosen to officiate the game. Up to that point, he had taken charge of two games in the qualifying competition, including Wales' home game against Spain the previous April. Although regarded highly enough by FIFA to be chosen for the 1984 Olympic Final, he had a reputation for being strict in his interpretation of the rules.

== Match ==
Several people, including midfielder Gordon Strachan, had noticed that Stein did not appear to be well prior to the start of the game. Roddy Forsyth of BBC Scotland had conducted an interview with Stein on the afternoon of the match for a documentary series, Only A Game?. Although appearing in good spirits in his conversation with Forsyth, the journalist also noted during a break in filming that Stein appeared pallid and was sweating heavily. This was in spite of it being a warm day but not, in Forsyth's opinion, being so hot as to cause someone to perspire significantly.

Nevertheless, Stein appeared to be in good spirits; during the warm-up, Wales goalkeeper Neville Southall found that the Scottish fans in the crowd kept all of the balls he and Eddie Niedzwiecki were using. On returning to the dressing room he spoke about it to Stein, who then went out onto the pitch and gestured to the fans to return all the balls. Prior to the start he took his place in the dugout and the game kicked off without incident.

=== First half ===
In the return game at Hampden Park, the Welsh strikers, Ian Rush and Mark Hughes, had been more than a match for Scotland's defensive set-up, with even Stein declaring that they had been "magnificent". It had been a challenge from Hughes on defender Alex McLeish that had ultimately allowed Rush to score the winner on that night. So, to counter the threat of the Welsh pair, Stein elected to set up with five defenders and only three midfielders, as opposed to the traditional back line of four that had played in March.

The game began at a furious pace, with both teams prepared to fight hard; after only two minutes, Hughes made a heavy tackle on McLeish that incensed the Scotland players, while only a minute later McLeish was booked for a challenge on Rush. Scotland's defence was unable to prevent Wales taking the lead after thirteen minutes, when Peter Nicholas made a low cross, despite the attention of both Aitken and Steve Nicol, for Hughes to score past goalkeeper Jim Leighton. Wales almost scored again in the twentieth minute when Joey Jones crossed for Robbie James, whose header went just over the bar. In the 38th minute, a Welsh free kick was blocked twice by Leighton, with the second falling at the feet of Hughes, whose shot went just wide. Then, just before half-time, Leighton misjudged the flight of a cross that caused the ball to drop again to Hughes; the Scottish keeper prevented Wales scoring a second by diving at Hughes' feet.

=== Half-time ===
Once half-time was reached, it was clear that Scotland, and Jim Leighton in particular, were in difficulty. In the dressing room, Leighton admitted that the reason he had missed the cross at the end of the first half, which led to the last-ditch save at the feet of Mark Hughes, was that he was shortsighted and, having lost one of his contact lenses, did not have a spare pair with him. Leighton had not been forthcoming about his eyesight because of fears that it might harm his career. As a consequence, the fact that the goalkeeper even needed lenses was something that his teammates, Alex Ferguson (who was also Leighton's club manager at Aberdeen) or, most importantly, a furious Jock Stein did not know.

During the half-time interval, Stein gave Gordon Strachan notice that he planned to bring him off during the second half and replace him with winger Davie Cooper. Stein's five-man defensive set-up meant that his midfielders were outnumbered by the Welsh, and consequently Strachan had failed to make an impact on the game up to then. Despite this, Strachan was prepared to argue with Stein that he should remain on, until Alex Ferguson cautioned him to be aware that the manager was clearly not well, and should not cause too much stress with a confrontation.

=== Second half ===
The situation with Leighton meant that Scotland were forced to make a half-time substitution, replacing the goalkeeper with Alan Rough, whose last international had been against the Soviet Union during the 1982 World Cup group stage. The second half began with Wales remaining in control of the game as they had been during the first half, with their best chance coming when Ian Rush mis-hit what appeared to be a simple tap-in, causing it to pass wide. As a consequence, with an hour of the game gone, Stein made his second and final substitution, withdrawing Strachan and replacing him with Davie Cooper on the left-hand side. Cooper had a reputation for being somewhat mercurial; he was considered to be one of the most gifted Scottish players of his generation, but was regarded as the type of player who could be anonymous throughout games. On this occasion, Cooper's introduction had an impact and caused the home side to look vulnerable for the first time. Scotland were gaining in confidence, but they were running out of time, with the Welsh defenders able to absorb the pressure and use the long clearance to get the ball upfield towards Hughes and Rush, who held the ball and waited for reinforcement from their midfielders. Scotland had already had a penalty claim turned down for an apparent push on David Speedie when, with nine minutes left, Nicol crossed into the Welsh box. The ball was nodded down by Graeme Sharp into Speedie's path; his shot, which appeared to be heading over the crossbar, struck defender David Phillips on the elbow and led to the Dutch referee awarding Scotland a penalty. With the majority of the Scottish team electing to leave the ball, it was Cooper who stepped up to assume responsibility to take the spot kick. Striking it low and hard to the right, Cooper's penalty was successful despite the efforts of Welsh goalkeeper Neville Southall, and the score was brought level. Immediately, Mike England made a substitution, withdrawing midfielder Robbie James and bringing on forward Steve Lovell in an effort to regain the advantage. Two minutes later he made his second and final substitution, bringing off Mickey Thomas for Clayton Blackmore.

At the time the penalty was taken, the Welsh dugout was surrounded by press and photographers, as the home team were still leading 1–0. With the scores levelled, the pack switched their attention to the Scottish bench, which led to Stein remonstrating with at least one photographer to move out of the way of his view of the game. Both Professor Stewart Hillis, the Scotland team doctor (who was also Stein's consultant), and Welsh manager Mike England stated that there appeared to be nothing wrong at this point.

While the rest of the Scottish bench were celebrating Cooper's successful penalty, Stein was unanimated. It was thought that he was merely following the advice he had given to his staff and players throughout the evening - "keep your dignity". Ferguson had noted that the manager appeared even more pallid, and was sweating profusely.

With approximately two minutes of normal time left, the referee's whistle blew for an infringement. Stein appeared to think that the final whistle had been blown, as he rose from his seat and began to make his way towards the Welsh bench to shake hands with England. As he got up, he fell to his knees before collapsing to the ground. He was immediately carried to the away dressing room where attempts were made to resuscitate him.

=== Post-match ===
The final whistle blew with the score remaining at 1–1. The Scottish players began celebrating their achievement with the estimated 12,000 Scotland fans who had made the trip to Cardiff, but were immediately aware that something was not right on the touchline. It was Alex Ferguson, who went onto the pitch after the final whistle, who began informing some of the players of Stein's collapse, news of which began to filter through to all of them as they made their way back to the dressing room.

Reports were confused initially – television pictures broadcast on ITV showed Stein, who appeared to be conscious and alert, being carried down the tunnel by police officers, with commentator Brian Moore speculating that he had been overcome with the emotion of the result. Martin Tyler of ITV Sport, who had been working as the pitchside reporter, and had been standing near Stein when he collapsed, reported that, despite the apparently alarming scenes, Stein was telling everyone that he was OK. BBC Radio commentator Peter Jones, who had no access to the television pictures and was relying on information from other people in the press box, also speculated that the tension of the result and the night had led to Stein's collapse.

In the treatment room, Stein, who had remained conscious throughout, was on the table being supported by Ernie Walker and Bill Dickie, two senior members of the SFA, while the on site medical team led by Stewart Hillis tried to keep his heart beating. Hillis at one point administered an injection to try to make Stein more comfortable, with Stein saying to him "that feels better Doc". Seconds later, Stein slipped into unconsciousness; despite the efforts of Stewart Hillis, he was pronounced dead approximately half an hour after the final whistle.

== Aftermath ==
Daily Record, 11 September 1985

As the crowd began making their way home from Ninian Park, the news began to filter out slowly. Some Scottish fans had elected to remain in Cardiff and were celebrating the achievement of guaranteeing the play-off spot when they saw and heard what had happened. Others had boarded trains or were in cars heading home – many fans did not hear the news until they got home the following day.

The death of Jock Stein cast a pall over the Scottish team that had gained the point they needed to ensure their continued participation in qualification for the World Cup. The squad returned to Edinburgh the same night, reflecting on the loss of their manager, while the celebrations of the fans was cut short by the news. While being interviewed on television after the news broke, one said:

We'd rather be out of the World Cup and have Big Jock back.

Stein's body was returned to Glasgow, where his funeral took place on 13 September 1985. In later years it became known that it was not a heart attack, but rather pulmonary oedema (fluid in the lungs) as a result of heart disease that caused Stein's death. Stein had stopped taking the diuretic medication prescribed for this in the days leading up to the game, which has been suggested as a contributory factor to his eventual collapse.

=== Scotland ===
Two weeks after Scotland had secured the point they needed against Wales, Spain played their final qualifier at home to Iceland, winning the game 2–1 to top the group and qualify automatically for the World Cup, leaving Scotland in second to go into the play-off.

Final Group 7 table

Team	Pld	W	D	L	GF	GA	GD	Pts
Spain	6	4	0	2	9	8	+1	8
Scotland	6	3	1	2	8	4	+4	7
Wales	6	3	1	2	7	6	+1	7
Iceland	6	1	0	5	4	10	−6	2

Following Stein's death, his assistant Alex Ferguson agreed to take charge of the national team. Initially, this was intended to be a one-off for the friendly that was planned for the free date on 16 October. The lack of time available in the lead up to the play-off meant finding a permanent replacement would prove difficult, and so Ferguson was officially appointed on 1 October at least until after the World Cup. While waiting to find out who they would play, Ferguson's first game in charge saw the team take on East Germany in a friendly at Hampden Park on 16 October. Their opponents were finally confirmed on 3 November, when Australia beat New Zealand to take an unassailable lead at the top of the four team Oceania group. Scotland came through the two-legged tie thanks to a 2–0 home win in Glasgow and a 0–0 draw in Melbourne, which saw them become the 24th and final team to qualify for the World Cup finals in Mexico.

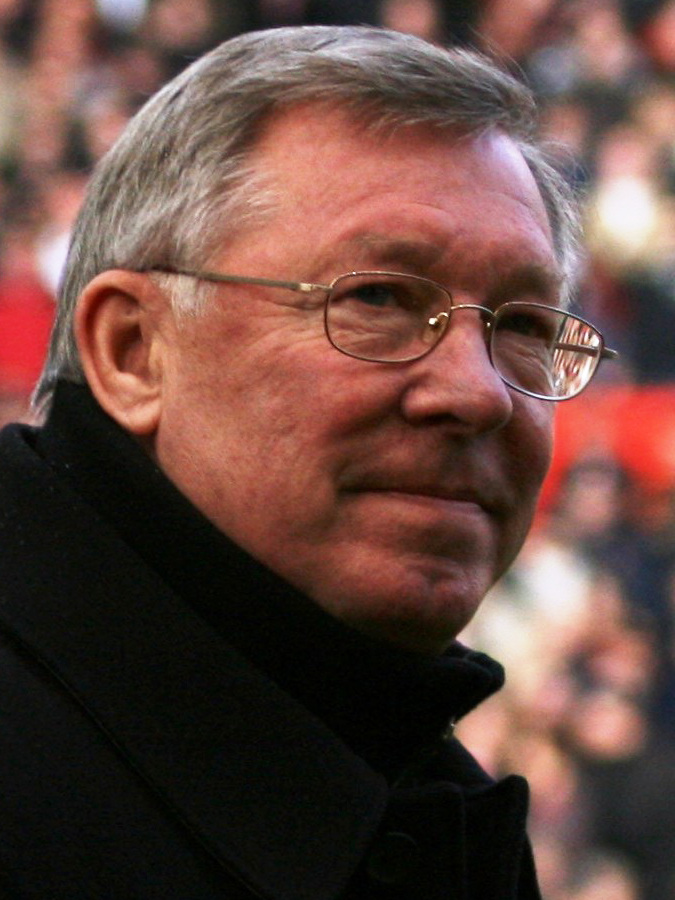
Alex Ferguson was appointed as the national team manager until at least the end of the World Cup.

Ferguson remained in charge through the remainder of the 1985–86 season and into their World Cup campaign, which saw them eliminated in the group stage, gaining only a single point, before stepping down at the end of June 1986, to be replaced by the SFA's Director of Coaching Andy Roxburgh. Ferguson's record saw him in charge for a total of ten games, of which five were competitive games and five (including the 1986 Rous Cup match) were friendlies. Of those, the team won three, lost three and drew four.

Subsequent Scotland results 1985–86
Date	Venue	Opponents	Attendance	Score (Note: Scotland score first)	Competition	Scotland scorers
16 October 1985	Hampden Park, Glasgow (H)	East Germany	41,114	0–0	Friendly	
20 November 1985	Hampden Park, Glasgow (H)	Australia	61,920	2–0	WCQPO	Cooper, McAvennie
4 December 1985	Olympic Park, Melbourne (A)	Australia	32,000	0–0	WCQPO	
28 January 1986	National Stadium, Ramat Gan (A)	Israel	7,000	1–0	Friendly	McStay
27 March 1986	Hampden Park, Glasgow (H)	Romania	53,589	3–0	Friendly	Strachan, Gough, Aitken
23 April 1986	Wembley Stadium, London (A)	England	68,357	1–2	Rous Cup	Souness
29 April 1986	Philips Stadion, Eindhoven (A)	Netherlands	14,500	0–0	Friendly	
4 June 1986	Neza Stadium, Nezahualcóyotl (N)	Denmark	18,000	0–1	WCGE	
8 June 1986	Estadio la Corregidora, Querétaro (N)	West Germany	30,000	1–2	WCGE	Strachan
13 June 1986	Neza Stadium, Nezahualcóyotl (N)	Uruguay	36,000	0–0	WCGE	

=== Wales ===
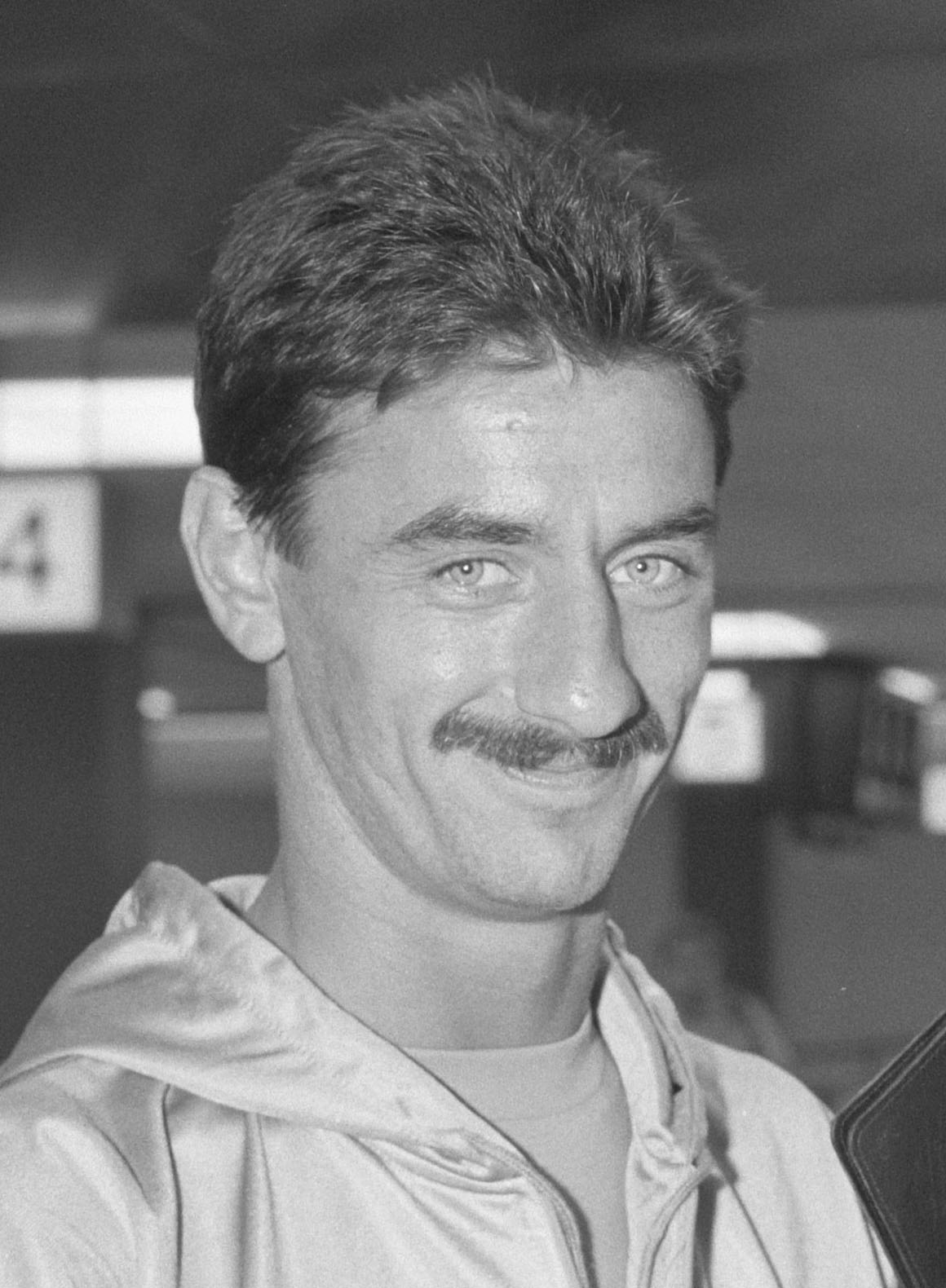
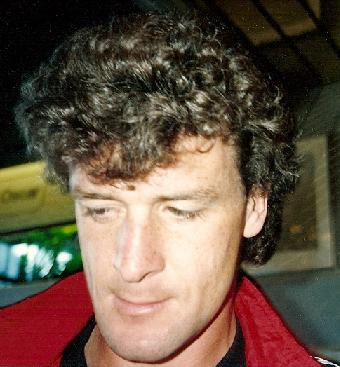
Ian Rush (left) and Mark Hughes (right) were part of what was considered a "golden generation" of Welsh footballers.

For the third successive tournament, Wales had missed out on qualification by a slender margin, having missed the 1982 World Cup on goal difference, and the 1984 European Championship by a single point. Despite this setback, which was followed by a 3–0 home defeat to Hungary in October, the team went through the rest of the season with only one other defeat, against Canada in May 1986. There was also the sense of history repeating itself in that, just as in 1977, it was a controversial penalty decision that ended up costing them dearly. Despite this, there was also a feeling that, given the group of players available to them, they would qualify for the next tournament. As it was, Wales failed to qualify for a major tournament until the 2016 European Championships.

Mike England was convinced that choosing Ninian Park as the venue was a factor in Wales failing to secure the win they needed, given the team's record when playing at Wrexham, and criticised the FAW for making the choice. Wales played two more home games that season against teams that had qualified for the World Cup by finishing top of their qualifying groups. On 16 October, Hungary came to Ninian Park and won 3–0, while on 21 April 1986, Wales's final home game that season saw them gain a 0–0 draw against Uruguay at the Racecourse Ground in Wrexham.

Subsequent Wales results 1985–86
Date	Venue	Opponents	Attendance	Score (Note: Wales score first)	Competition	Wales scorers
16 October 1985	Ninian Park, Cardiff (H)	Hungary	3,505	0–3	Friendly	
25 February 1986	Fahd Stadium, Dhahran (A)	Saudi Arabia	20,000	2–1	Friendly	Davies, Slater
26 March 1986	Lansdowne Road, Dublin (A)	Republic of Ireland	16,500	1–0	Friendly	Rush
21 April 1986	Racecourse Ground, Wrexham (H)	Uruguay	11,154	0–0	Friendly	
10 May 1986	North York Civic Stadium, Toronto (A)	Canada	13,142	0–2	Friendly	
19 May 1986	Empire Stadium, Vancouver (A)	Canada	9,007	3–0	Friendly	Saunders (2), Allen

England oversaw a further qualifying campaign, for the 1988 European Championships, which Wales again failed to qualify for. As a consequence of this, the FAW terminated his contract at the beginning of 1988. England admitted that the death of Jock Stein had significantly affected him and, following his dismissal from his post as Wales manager, he never worked in football again, instead focusing on the timber business he founded in 1969, before buying and managing two care homes in North Wales.

==== Welsh home venues ====
In 1989, the FAW reached agreement with the Welsh Rugby Union to play at the National Stadium in Cardiff, with the majority of home games being played there for the next decade, interspersed with occasional visits to Wrexham. In 1997, demolition of the National Stadium began, to be replaced on the same site by the Millennium Stadium, intended to serve as a home for both the football and rugby union teams. Since 2000, as well as continued improvements to the Racecourse Ground, both Cardiff City (the Cardiff City Stadium; opened 2009) and Swansea City (the Swansea.com Stadium; opened 2005) have built new grounds. The new Parc y Scarlets (opened 2008) in Llanelli has also been constructed to meet UEFA's international criteria. This, added to the difficulty the FAW have had in filling the 74,000 seat Millennium Stadium in recent years, has led them to come full circle, with the majority of home games in recent years taking place at venues other than the national stadium.

Welsh home venues 2000–2024
	Millennium Stadium	Cardiff City Stadium	Racecourse Ground	Swansea.com Stadium (Note: Originally named as the Liberty Stadium)	Parc y Scarlets
Capacity	72,500	33,280	12,600 (Note: The replacement of the old Spion Kop terrace at the Racecourse will increase the all-seated capacity to more than 15,000.)	21,088	14,547
2000–2004	19	N/A	1	N/A	N/A
2005-2009	16	1	3	3	1
2010-2014	1	14	0	4	2
2015-2019	1	18	1	0	0
2020-2024	0	25	1	1	0
Total	37	58	6	8	3

=== Recollections ===
In the years since Jock Stein's death, some, including Alex Ferguson, have said that they noticed changes in him in the days and weeks prior to the game against Wales. Gordon Strachan found it difficult to understand what Stein was saying during his team-talk. Strachan came to accept that the final decision Stein made, to replace him with Davie Cooper, was the correct one given Cooper's subsequent impact on the game.

On the 20th anniversary of Stein's death, Cardiff City unveiled a plaque commemorating the night at Ninian Park, located in the away dugout:

In respectful memory of Jock Stein who sadly left football forever while managing Scotland at Ninian Park on 10 September 1985. From football fans all over the world on the 20th anniversary.

In 2009, the memorial was removed from the stadium when it was demolished and transferred to the "Ninian Park Gates" at the new Cardiff City Stadium. In 2010, to mark the 25th anniversary of Stein's death, the original plaque was removed and taken to the Celtic museum at Celtic Park in Glasgow, and was replaced at the Cardiff City Stadium by a replica bearing the same inscription.

== Match details ==
1986 FIFA World Cup qualification
10 September 1985
19:30 BST

Wales	1–1	Scotland
Hughes 13'	Report	Cooper 81' (pen.)

Ninian Park, Cardiff
Attendance: 34,247
Referee: Jan Keizer (Netherlands)

Wales	Scotland

GK	1	Neville Southall (Everton)
DF	2	Joey Jones (Huddersfield Town)
DF	5	Pat Van Den Hauwe (Everton)
DF	4	Kevin Ratcliffe (c) (Everton)
DF	3	Kenny Jackett (Watford)
MF	7	Robbie James (Queen's Park Rangers)		(substituted off) 81'
MF	6	David Phillips (Manchester City)
MF	8	Peter Nicholas (Luton Town)
MF	10	Mickey Thomas (Chelsea)		(substituted off) 83'
CF	11	Mark Hughes (Manchester United)
CF	9	Ian Rush (Liverpool)	(yellow card) 52'
Substitutes:
GK	12	Eddie Niedzwiecki (Chelsea)
DF	14	Neil Slatter (Oxford United)
MF	15	Clayton Blackmore (Manchester United)		(substituted on) 83'
CF	13	Steve Lovell (Millwall)		(substituted on) 81'
Manager:
(Wales) Mike England

GK	1	Jim Leighton (Aberdeen)		(substituted off) 46'
DF	2	Richard Gough (Dundee United)
DF	3	Maurice Malpas (Dundee United)
DF	4	Roy Aitken (Celtic)
DF	5	Alex McLeish (Aberdeen)	(yellow card) 3'
DF	6	Willie Miller (c) (Aberdeen)
MF	7	Steve Nicol (Liverpool)
MF	8	Gordon Strachan (Manchester United)		(substituted off) 61'
MF	10	Jim Bett (Aberdeen)
CF	9	Graeme Sharp (Everton)
CF	11	David Speedie (Chelsea)
Substitutes:
GK	12	Alan Rough (Hibernian)		(substituted on) 46'
MF	14	Paul McStay (Celtic)
MF	16	Davie Cooper (Rangers)		(substituted on) 61'
CF	15	Andy Gray (Aston Villa)
Manager:
(Scotland) Jock Stein
