= 1986 FIFA World Cup qualification – UEFA Group 7 =

Football tournament qualification stage

The 1986 FIFA World Cup qualification UEFA Group 7 was a UEFA qualifying group for the 1986 FIFA World Cup. The group comprised Iceland, Scotland, Spain and Wales.

The group was won by Spain, who qualified for the 1986 FIFA World Cup. The runners-up Scotland entered the UEFA–OFC intercontinental play-off.

== Standings ==
Pos	Team	Pld	W	D	L	GF	GA	GD	Pts	Qualification	Spain national football team	Scotland national football team	Wales national football team	Iceland national football team
1	Spain	6	4	0	2	9	8	+1	8	Qualification to 1986 FIFA World Cup	—	1–0	3–0	2–1
2	Scotland	6	3	1	2	8	4	+4	7	Advance to UEFA–OFC play-off	3–1	—	0–1	3–0
3	Wales	6	3	1	2	7	6	+1	7		3–0	1–1	—	2–1
4	Iceland	6	1	0	5	4	10	−6	2		1–2	0–1	1–0	—

=== Results ===
12 September 1984

Iceland	1–0	Wales
Bergs 50'	Report

Laugardalsvöllur, Reykjavík
Attendance: 10,837
Referee: Steen Jenssen (Denmark)

17 October 1984

Spain	3–0	Wales
Rincón 7'; Carrasco 83'; Butragueño 89'	Report

Estadio Benito Villamarín, Seville
Attendance: 26,564
Referee: Erik Fredriksson (Sweden)
17 October 1984

Scotland	3–0	Iceland
McStay 26', 40'; Nicholas 74'	Report

Hampden Park, Glasgow
Attendance: 52,829
Referee: Egbert Mulder (Netherlands)

14 November 1984

Wales	2–1	Iceland
Thomas 36'; Hughes 62'	Report	Petursson 56'

Ninian Park, Cardiff
Attendance: 10,506
Referee: Edward Farrell (Republic of Ireland)
14 November 1984

Scotland	3–1	Spain
M.Johnston 33', 42'; Dalglish 71'	Report	Goikoetxea 65'

Hampden Park, Glasgow
Attendance: 74,299
Referee: Adolf Prokop (East Germany)

27 February 1985

Spain	1–0	Scotland
Clos 48'	Report

Estadio Ramón Sánchez Pizjuán, Seville
Attendance: 54,524
Referee: Michel Vautrot (France)

27 March 1985

Scotland	0–1	Wales
	Report	Rush 37'

Hampden Park, Glasgow
Attendance: 62,424
Referee: Alexis Ponnet (Belgium)

30 April 1985

Wales	3–0	Spain
Rush 44', 86'; Hughes 53'	Report

Racecourse Ground, Wrexham
Attendance: 23,494
Referee: Jan Keizer (Netherlands)

28 May 1985

Iceland	0–1	Scotland
	Report	Bett 86'

Laugardalsvöllur, Reykjavík
Attendance: 15,474
Referee: Anatoly Milchenko (Soviet Union)

12 June 1985

Iceland	1–2	Spain
Thordasson 33'	Report	Sarabia 50'; Marcos 67'

Laugardalsvöllur, Reykjavík
Attendance: 10,410
Referee: Andre Daina (Switzerland)

10 September 1985

Wales	1–1	Scotland
Hughes 13'	Report	Cooper 80' (pen.)

Ninian Park, Cardiff
Attendance: 34,247
Referee: Jan Keizer (Netherlands)

25 September 1985

Spain	2–1	Iceland
Rincón 44'; Gordillo 51'	Report	Thorbjornsson 35'

Estadio Benito Villamarín, Seville
Attendance: 42,210
Referee: Siegfried Kirschen (East Germany)

== Goalscorers ==
3 goals

- (Wales) Mark Hughes
- (Wales) Ian Rush

2 goals

- (Scotland) Mo Johnston
- (Scotland) Paul McStay
- (Spain) Hipólito Rincón

1 goal

- (Iceland) Magnús Bergs
- (Iceland) Pétur Pétursson
- (Iceland) Guðmundur Þorbjörnsson
- (Iceland) Teitur Þórðarson
- (Scotland) Jim Bett
- (Scotland) Davie Cooper
- (Scotland) Kenny Dalglish
- (Scotland) Charlie Nicholas
- (Spain) Emilio Butragueño
- (Spain) Francisco José Carrasco
- (Spain) Paco Clos
- (Spain) Andoni Goikoetxea
- (Spain) Rafael Gordillo
- (Spain) Marcos Alonso Peña
- (Spain) Manuel Sarabia
- (Wales) Mickey Thomas
