= Rob de Wit =

Rob de Wit may refer to:

- Robert de Wit (born 1962), Dutch Olympic decathlete and bobsledder
- Rob de Wit (footballer) (born 1963), Dutch footballer
