= 1986 FIFA World Cup qualification – UEFA Group 6 =

Football tournament qualification stage

The 1986 FIFA World Cup qualification UEFA Group 6 was a UEFA qualifying group for the 1986 FIFA World Cup. The group comprised Denmark, Norway, Republic of Ireland, Soviet Union and Switzerland.

The group was won by Denmark with the Soviet Union as the runners up. Both teams qualified for the 1986 FIFA World Cup.

== Standings ==
Pos	Team	Pld	W	D	L	GF	GA	GD	Pts	Qualification	Denmark national football team	Soviet Union national football team	Switzerland national football team	Republic of Ireland national football team	Norway national football team
1	Denmark	8	5	1	2	17	6	+11	11	Qualification to 1986 FIFA World Cup	—	4–2	0–0	3–0	1–0
2	Soviet Union	8	4	2	2	13	8	+5	10	Qualification to 1986 FIFA World Cup	1–0	—	4–0	2–0	1–0
3	Switzerland	8	2	4	2	5	10	−5	8		1–0	2–2	—	0–0	1–1
4	Republic of Ireland	8	2	2	4	5	10	−5	6		1–4	1–0	3–0	—	0–0
5	Norway	8	1	3	4	4	10	−6	5		1–5	1–1	0–1	1–0	—

=== Results ===
12 September 1984

Republic of Ireland	1–0	Soviet Union
Walsh 64'	Report

Lansdowne Road, Dublin
Attendance: 27,070
Referee: Jan Keizer (Netherlands)
12 September 1984

Norway	0–1	Switzerland
	Report	Egli 3' (pen.)

Ullevaal Stadion, Oslo
Attendance: 15,139
Referee: Egon Sostarić (Yugoslavia)

26 September 1984

Denmark	1–0	Norway
Elkjær 56'	Report

Parken Stadium, Copenhagen
Attendance: 45,400
Referee: Ronald Bridges (Wales)

10 October 1984

Norway	1–1	Soviet Union
Thoresen 54' (pen.)	Report	Lytovchenko 74'

Ullevaal Stadion, Oslo
Attendance: 13,789
Referee: Volker Roth (West Germany)

17 October 1984

Norway	1–0	Republic of Ireland
Jacobsen 42'	Report

Ullevaal Stadion, Oslo
Attendance: 15,379
Referee: Klaus Scheurell (East Germany)
17 October 1984

Switzerland	1–0	Denmark
Barberis 42'	Report

Wankdorf Stadium, Bern
Attendance: 32,169
Referee: Neil Midgley (England)

14 November 1984

Denmark	3–0	Republic of Ireland
Elkjær 26', 46'; Lerby 55'	Report

Parken Stadium, Copenhagen
Attendance: 45,300
Referee: Robert Wurtz (France)

17 April 1985

Switzerland	2–2	Soviet Union
Bregy 43' (pen.); Egli 90'	Report	Gavrilov 36'; Demyanenko 80'

Wankdorf Stadium, Bern
Attendance: 42,432
Referee: Bob Valentine (Scotland)

1 May 1985

Republic of Ireland	0–0	Norway
	Report

Lansdowne Road, Dublin
Attendance: 20,049
Referee: Lajos Nemeth (Hungary)

2 May 1985

Soviet Union	4–0	Switzerland
Protasov 18', 39'; Kondratiev 44', 45'	Report

Central Lenin Stadium, Moscow
Attendance: 94,843
Referee: Roger Schoeters (Belgium)

2 June 1985

Republic of Ireland	3–0	Switzerland
Stapleton 7'; Grealish 33'; Sheedy 57'	Report

Lansdowne Road, Dublin
Attendance: 16,918
Referee: Paolo Bergamo (Italy)

5 June 1985

Denmark	4–2	Soviet Union
Elkjær 16', 20'; M. Laudrup 61', 64'	Report	Protasov 25'; Gotsmanov 68'

Parken Stadium, Copenhagen
Attendance: 45,700
Referee: Horst Brummeier (Austria)

11 September 1985

Switzerland	0–0	Republic of Ireland
	Report

Wankdorf Stadium, Bern
Attendance: 20,489
Referee: Emilio Soriano Aladrén (Spain)

25 September 1985

Soviet Union	1–0	Denmark
Protasov 50'	Report

Central Lenin Stadium, Moscow
Attendance: 100,000
Referee: Antonis Vassaras (Greece)

9 October 1985

Denmark	0–0	Switzerland
	Report

Parken Stadium, Copenhagen
Attendance: 45,600
Referee: Joel Quiniou (France)

16 October 1985

Soviet Union	2–0	Republic of Ireland
Cherenkov 61'; Protasov 90'	Report

Central Lenin Stadium, Moscow
Attendance: 99,643
Referee: Paolo Casarin (Italy)
16 October 1985

Norway	1–5	Denmark
Sundby 44'	Report	M. Laudrup 56'; Lerby 63' (pen.); Elkjær 65'; Berggreen 75', 78'

Ullevaal Stadion, Oslo
Attendance: 18,326
Referee: Ioan Igna (Romania)

30 October 1985

Soviet Union	1–0	Norway
Kondratiev 58'	Report

Central Lenin Stadium, Moscow
Attendance: 44,696
Referee: Brian McGinlay (Scotland)

13 November 1985

Republic of Ireland	1–4	Denmark
Stapleton 6'	Report	Elkjær 7', 76'; M. Laudrup 49'; Sivebæk 57'

Lansdowne Road, Dublin
Attendance: 14,933
Referee: Franz Wöhrer (Austria)
13 November 1985

Switzerland	1–1	Norway
Matthey 54'	Report	Sundby 40'

Stadion Allmend, Lucerne
Attendance: 2,635
Referee: Ovadia Ben-Itzhak (Israel)

== Goalscorers ==
8 goals

- (Denmark) Preben Elkjær

5 goals

- (Soviet Union) Oleh Protasov

4 goals

- (Denmark) Michael Laudrup

3 goals

- (Soviet Union) Georgi Kondratiev

2 goals

- (Denmark) Klaus Berggreen
- (Denmark) Søren Lerby
- (Republic of Ireland) Frank Stapleton
- (Norway) Tom Sundby
- (Switzerland) André Egli

1 goal

- (Denmark) John Sivebæk
- (Republic of Ireland) Tony Grealish
- (Republic of Ireland) Kevin Sheedy
- (Republic of Ireland) Mickey Walsh
- (Norway) Pål Jacobsen
- (Norway) Hallvar Thoresen
- (Soviet Union) Fyodor Cherenkov
- (Soviet Union) Anatoliy Demyanenko
- (Soviet Union) Yuri Gavrilov
- (Soviet Union) Sergey Gotsmanov
- (Soviet Union) Hennadiy Lytovchenko
- (Switzerland) Umberto Barberis
- (Switzerland) Jean-Paul Brigger
- (Switzerland) Christian Matthey
