= 1986 FIFA World Cup qualification – UEFA Group 2 =

Football tournament qualification stage

The 1986 FIFA World Cup qualification UEFA Group 2 was a UEFA qualifying group for the 1986 FIFA World Cup. The group comprised Czechoslovakia, Malta, Portugal, Sweden and West Germany.

The group was won by West Germany with Portugal as the runners up. Both teams qualified for the 1986 FIFA World Cup.

== Standings ==
Pos	Team	Pld	W	D	L	GF	GA	GD	Pts	Qualification	Germany national football team	Portugal national football team	Sweden men's national football team	Czechoslovakia national football team	Malta national football team
1	West Germany	8	5	2	1	22	9	+13	12	Qualification to 1986 FIFA World Cup	—	0–1	2–0	2–2	6–0
2	Portugal	8	5	0	3	12	10	+2	10	Qualification to 1986 FIFA World Cup	1–2	—	1–3	2–1	3–2
3	Sweden	8	4	1	3	14	9	+5	9		2–2	0–1	—	2–0	4–0
4	Czechoslovakia	8	3	2	3	11	12	−1	8		1–5	1–0	2–1	—	4–0
5	Malta	8	0	1	7	6	25	−19	1		2–3	1–3	1–2	0–0	—

=== Results ===
23 May 1984

Sweden	4–0	Malta
Sunesson 4', 75'; Corneliusson 37'; Erlandsson 70'	Report

Nya Parken, Norrköping
Attendance: 18,819
Referee: David Syme (Scotland)

12 September 1984

Sweden	0–1	Portugal
	Report	Gomes 78'

Råsunda Stadium, Solna
Attendance: 30,136
Referee: Joël Quiniou (France)

14 October 1984

Portugal	2–1	Czechoslovakia
Diamantino 14'; Carlos Manuel 50'	Report	Janečka 39'

Estádio das Antas, Porto
Attendance: 18,357
Referee: George Courtney (England)

17 October 1984

West Germany	2–0	Sweden
Rahn 75'; Rummenigge 88'	Report

Müngersdorfer Stadion, Cologne
Attendance: 57,512
Referee: Bob Valentine (Scotland)

31 October 1984

Czechoslovakia	4–0	Malta
Janečka 17', 71'; Jarolím 35'; Berger 77' (pen.)	Report

Stadion Evžena Rošického, Prague
Attendance: 3,404
Referee: Gudmundur Haraldsson (Iceland)

14 November 1984

Portugal	1–3	Sweden
Jordão 11'	Report	Prytz 29' (pen.), 35'; Nilsson 38'

Estádio José Alvalade, Lisbon
Attendance: 21,089
Referee: Roger Schoeters (Belgium)

16 December 1984

Malta	2–3	West Germany
Busuttil 10'; Xuereb 84'	Report	Förster 43'; Allofs 68', 83'

Ta' Qali National Stadium, Ta' Qali
Attendance: 35,102
Referee: Zoran Petrovic (Yugoslavia)

10 February 1985

Malta	1–3	Portugal
Farrugia 59'	Report	Carlos Manuel 6'; Gomes 13', 74'

Ta' Qali National Stadium, Ta' Qali
Attendance: 22,610
Referee: Miklos Nagy (Hungary)

24 February 1985

Portugal	1–2	West Germany
Diamantino 57'	Report	Littbarski 28'; Völler 37'

Estádio Nacional, Lisbon
Attendance: 43,899
Referee: Paolo Casarin (Italy)

27 March 1985

West Germany	6–0	Malta
Rahn 10', 17'; Magath 13'; Littbarski 18'; Rummenigge 43', 67'	Report

Ludwigsparkstadion, Saarbrücken
Attendance: 33,978
Referee: Talat Tokat (Turkey)

21 April 1985

Malta	0–0	Czechoslovakia
	Report

Ta' Qali National Stadium, Ta' Qali
Attendance: 9,234
Referee: Sanchez Arminio Victoriano (Spain)

30 April 1985

Czechoslovakia	1–5	West Germany
Griga 87'	Report	Berthold 8'; Littbarski 22'; Matthäus 36'; Herget 43'; Allofs 83'

Stadion Evžena Rošického, Prague
Attendance: 30,618
Referee: Joël Quiniou (France)

5 June 1985

Sweden	2–0	Czechoslovakia
Prytz 77' (pen.); Larsson 85'	Report

Råsunda Stadium, Solna
Attendance: 33,981
Referee: Edward Farrell (Republic of Ireland)

25 September 1985

Czechoslovakia	1–0	Portugal
Hruška 21'	Report

Stadion Evžena Rošického, Prague
Attendance: 7,711
Referee: Damir Matovinović (Yugoslavia)
25 September 1985

Sweden	2–2	West Germany
Corneliusson 63'; Magnusson 90'	Report	Völler 23'; Herget 40'

Råsunda Stadium, Solna
Attendance: 39,157
Referee: Marcel van Langenhove (Belgium)

12 October 1985

Portugal	3–2	Malta
Gomes 37', 82'; José Rafael 54'	Report	Frederico 46' (o.g.); Degiorgio 78'

Estádio da Luz, Lisbon
Attendance: 23,366
Referee: Alan Snoddy (Northern Ireland)

16 October 1985

Czechoslovakia	2–1	Sweden
Ravelli 41' (o.g.); Vízek 69'	Report	Corneliusson 6'

Stadion Evžena Rošického, Prague
Attendance: 5,814
Referee: Georges Sandoz (Switzerland)
16 October 1985

West Germany	0–1	Portugal
	Report	Carlos Manuel 55'

Neckarstadion, Stuttgart
Attendance: 55,024
Referee: Keith Hackett (England)

17 November 1985

Malta	1–2	Sweden
Farrugia 65'	Report	Prytz 2'; Strömberg 76'

Ta' Qali National Stadium, Ta' Qali
Attendance: 6,849
Referee: Yusuf Namoğlu (Turkey)
17 November 1985

West Germany	2–2	Czechoslovakia
Brehme 1'; Rummenigge 87'	Report	Novák 52'; Lauda 62'

Olympic Stadium, Munich
Attendance: 17,686
Referee: Svein-Inge Thime (Norway)

== Goalscorers ==
5 goals

- (Portugal) Fernando Gomes

4 goals

- (Sweden) Robert Prytz
- (West Germany) Karl-Heinz Rummenigge

3 goals

- (Czechoslovakia) Petr Janečka
- (Portugal) Carlos Manuel
- (Sweden) Dan Corneliusson
- (West Germany) Klaus Allofs
- (West Germany) Pierre Littbarski
- (West Germany) Uwe Rahn

2 goals

- (Malta) Leonard Farrugia
- (Portugal) Diamantino Miranda
- (Sweden) Thomas Sunesson
- (West Germany) Matthias Herget
- (West Germany) Rudi Völler

1 goal

- (Czechoslovakia) Jan Berger
- (Czechoslovakia) Stanislav Griga
- (Czechoslovakia) Vladimír Hruška
- (Czechoslovakia) Karel Jarolím
- (Czechoslovakia) Vladislav Lauda
- (Czechoslovakia) Josef Novák
- (Czechoslovakia) Ladislav Vízek
- (Malta) Carmel Busuttil
- (Malta) Michael Degiorgio
- (Malta) Raymond Xuereb
- (Portugal) Rui Jordão
- (Portugal) José Rafael
- (Sweden) Ingemar Erlandsson
- (Sweden) Lars Larsson
- (Sweden) Mats Magnusson
- (Sweden) Torbjörn Nilsson
- (Sweden) Glenn Strömberg
- (West Germany) Thomas Berthold
- (West Germany) Andreas Brehme
- (West Germany) Karlheinz Förster
- (West Germany) Felix Magath
- (West Germany) Lothar Matthäus

1 own goal

- (Portugal) Frederico Rosa (playing against Malta)
- (Sweden) Andreas Ravelli (playing against Czechoslovakia)
