= 1986 FIFA World Cup qualification – UEFA Group 3 =

Football tournament qualification stage

The 1986 FIFA World Cup qualification UEFA Group 3 was a UEFA qualifying group for the 1986 FIFA World Cup. The group comprised England, Finland, Northern Ireland, Romania and Turkey.

The group was won by England with Northern Ireland as the runners up. Both teams qualified for the 1986 FIFA World Cup.

== Standings ==
Pos	Team	Pld	W	D	L	GF	GA	GD	Pts	Qualification	England national football team	Northern Ireland national football team	Romania national football team	Finland national football team	Turkey national football team
1	England	8	4	4	0	21	2	+19	12	Qualification to 1986 FIFA World Cup	—	0–0	1–1	5–0	5–0
2	Northern Ireland	8	4	2	2	8	5	+3	10	Qualification to 1986 FIFA World Cup	0–1	—	3–2	2–1	2–0
3	Romania	8	3	3	2	12	7	+5	9		0–0	0–1	—	2–0	3–0
4	Finland	8	3	2	3	7	12	−5	8		1–1	1–0	1–1	—	1–0
5	Turkey	8	0	1	7	2	24	−22	1		0–8	0–0	1–3	1–2	—

=== Results ===
27 May 1984

Finland	1–0	Northern Ireland
Valvee 55'	Report

Porin Stadion, Pori
Attendance: 8,155
Referee: Karl-Heinz Tritschler (West Germany)

12 September 1984

Northern Ireland	3–2	Romania
Iorgulescu 34' (o.g.); Whiteside 61'; M. O'Neill 73'	Report	Hagi 36'; Geolgău 80'

Windsor Park, Belfast
Attendance: 17,269
Referee: Alexis Ponnet (Belgium)

17 October 1984

England	5–0	Finland
Hateley 29', 50'; Woodcock 41'; Robson 70'; Sansom 88'	Report

Wembley Stadium, London
Attendance: 47,234
Referee: Aleksander Suchanek (Poland)

31 October 1984

Turkey	1–2	Finland
Tüfekçi 78' (pen.)	Report	Hjelm 10'; Lipponen 68'

Antalya Atatürk Stadium, Antalya
Attendance: 7,062
Referee: Velodi Miminoschwili (Soviet Union)

14 November 1984

Turkey	0–8	England
	Report	Robson 13', 59', 61'; Woodcock 17', 43'; Barnes 47', 53'; Anderson 86'

İnönü Stadium, Istanbul
Attendance: 26,494
Referee: Vojtech Christov (Czechoslovakia)
14 November 1984

Northern Ireland	2–1	Finland
J. O'Neill 44'; Armstrong 51' (pen.)	Report	Lipponen 22'

Windsor Park, Belfast
Attendance: 19,457
Referee: Santos Da Silva (Portugal)

27 February 1985

Northern Ireland	0–1	England
	Report	Hateley 77'

Windsor Park, Belfast
Attendance: 28,500
Referee: Volker Roth (West Germany)

3 April 1985

Romania	3–0	Turkey
Hagi 21'; Cămătaru 28', 42'	Report

Stadionul Central, Craiova
Attendance: 20,816
Referee: Ovadia Ben Itzhak (Israel)

1 May 1985

Romania	0–0	England
	Report

Stadionul 23. August, Bucharest
Attendance: 49,229
Referee: Emilio Guruceta (Spain)
1 May 1985

Northern Ireland	2–0	Turkey
Whiteside 45', 54'	Report

Windsor Park, Belfast
Attendance: 15,603
Referee: Bruno Galler (Switzerland)

22 May 1985

Finland	1–1	England
Rantanen 5'	Report	Hateley 50'

Helsinki Olympic Stadium, Helsinki
Attendance: 30,311
Referee: Siegfried Kirschen (East Germany)

6 June 1985

Finland	1–1	Romania
Lipponen 26'	Report	Hagi 7'

Helsinki Olympic Stadium, Helsinki
Attendance: 24,863
Referee: Marcel van Langenhove (Belgium)

28 August 1985

Romania	2–0	Finland
Hagi 7'; Mateuț 56'	Report

Stadionul Dan Păltinișanu, Timișoara
Attendance: 17,826
Referee: Zoran Petrovic (Yugoslavia)

11 September 1985

Turkey	0–0	Northern Ireland
	Report

İzmir Atatürk Stadium, İzmir
Attendance: 39,157
Referee: Michel Vautrot (France)
11 September 1985

England	1–1	Romania
Hoddle 25'	Report	Cămătaru 60'

Wembley Stadium, London
Attendance: 61,310
Referee: Karl-Heinz Tritschler (West Germany)

25 September 1985

Finland	1–0	Turkey
Rantanen 38'	Report

Ratina Stadion, Tampere
Attendance: 5,616
Referee: Rune Larsson (Sweden)

16 October 1985
15:00 (UTC+2)

Romania	0–1	Northern Ireland
	Report	Quinn 29'

Stadionul 23. August, Bucharest
Attendance: 22,227
Referee: Henning Lund-Sørensen (Denmark)
16 October 1985
19:45 (UTC+1)

England	5–0	Turkey
Waddle 15'; Lineker 18', 43', 54'; Robson 35'	Report

Wembley Stadium, London
Attendance: 52,385
Referee: Anatoly Milchenko (Soviet Union)

13 November 1985
19:00 (UTC±0)

England	0–0	Northern Ireland
	Report

Wembley Stadium, London
Attendance: 72,712
Referee: Erik Fredriksson (Sweden)
13 November 1985

Turkey	1–3	Romania
Tekin 78'	Report	Iorgulescu 15'; Coraș 27'; Iovan 54'

İzmir Atatürk Stadium, İzmir
Attendance: 21,058
Referee: Volker Roth (West Germany)

== Goalscorers ==
5 goals

- (England) Bryan Robson

4 goals

- (England) Mark Hateley
- (Romania) Gheorghe Hagi

3 goals

- (England) Gary Lineker
- (England) Tony Woodcock
- (Finland) Mika Lipponen
- (Northern Ireland) Norman Whiteside
- (Romania) Rodion Cămătaru

2 goals

- (England) John Barnes
- (Finland) Jari Rantanen

1 goal

- (England) Viv Anderson
- (England) Glenn Hoddle
- (England) Kenny Sansom
- (England) Chris Waddle
- (Finland) Ari Hjelm
- (Finland) Ari Valvee
- (Northern Ireland) Gerry Armstrong
- (Northern Ireland) John O'Neill
- (Northern Ireland) Martin O'Neill
- (Northern Ireland) Jimmy Quinn
- (Romania) Marcel Coraș
- (Romania) Ion Geolgău
- (Romania) Gino Iorgulescu
- (Romania) Ștefan Iovan
- (Romania) Dorin Mateuț
- (Turkey) Metin Tekin
- (Turkey) İlyas Tüfekçi

1 own goal

- (Romania) Gino Iorgulescu (playing against Northern Ireland)
