= 1986 FIFA World Cup qualification – UEFA Group 5 =

Football tournament qualification stage

The 1986 FIFA World Cup qualification UEFA Group 5 was a UEFA qualifying group for the 1986 FIFA World Cup. The group comprised Austria, Cyprus, Hungary and Netherlands.

The group was won by Hungary, who qualified for the 1986 FIFA World Cup. The Netherlands were the runners-up determined on goals scored and entered the UEFA play-off stage.

== Standings ==
Pos	Team	Pld	W	D	L	GF	GA	GD	Pts	Qualification	Hungary national football team	Netherlands national football team	Austria national football team	Cyprus national football team
1	Hungary	6	5	0	1	12	4	+8	10	Qualification to 1986 FIFA World Cup	—	0–1	3–1	2–0
2	Netherlands	6	3	1	2	11	5	+6	7	Advance to UEFA play-off	1–2	—	1–1	7–1
3	Austria	6	3	1	2	9	8	+1	7		0–3	1–0	—	4–0
4	Cyprus	6	0	0	6	3	18	−15	0		1–2	0–1	1–2	—

=== Results ===
2 May 1984

Cyprus	1 – 2	Austria
Christophorou 72'	Report	Gisinger 37'; Prohaska 75'

Makario Stadium, Nicosia
Attendance: 3,455
Referee: Menachem Ashkenazi (Israel)

26 September 1984

Hungary	3 – 1	Austria
Nagy 50'; Esterházy 61'; Kardos 77'	Report	Schachner 23'

Népstadion, Budapest
Attendance: 25,417
Referee: Michel Vautrot (France)

17 October 1984

Netherlands	1 – 2	Hungary
Kieft 19'	Report	Détári 24'; Esterházy 55'

De Kuip, Rotterdam
Attendance: 52,148
Referee: André Daina (Switzerland)

14 November 1984

Austria	1 – 0	Netherlands
Valke 15' (o.g.)	Report

Gerhard-Hanappi-Stadion, Vienna
Attendance: 12,490
Referee: Anatoly Milchenko (Soviet Union)

17 November 1984

Cyprus	1 – 2	Hungary
Foti 28'	Report	Róth 49'; Nyilasi 89'

Tsirion Stadium, Limassol
Attendance: 4,650
Referee: Brian McGinlay (Scotland)

23 December 1984

Cyprus	0 – 1	Netherlands
	Report	Houtman 84'

Makario Stadium, Nicosia
Attendance: 2,371
Referee: Bogdan Dotchev (Bulgaria)

27 February 1985

Netherlands	7 – 1	Cyprus
E.Koeman 12'; Kieft 28', 58'; Schoenaker 30', 79'; Pantziaras 64' (o.g.) van Basten 65'	Report	Marangos 8'

De Meer Stadion, Amsterdam
Attendance: 19,035
Referee: Dusan Krchnak (Czechoslovakia)

3 April 1985

Hungary	2 – 0	Cyprus
Nyilasi 48'; Szokolai 83'	Report

Népstadion, Budapest
Attendance: 24,843
Referee: Einar Halle (Norway)

17 April 1985

Austria	0 – 3	Hungary
	Report	Kiprich 21', 33'; Détári 48'

Gerhard-Hanappi-Stadion, Vienna
Attendance: 17,869
Referee: Jakob Baumann (Switzerland)

1 May 1985

Netherlands	1 – 1	Austria
Kieft 55'	Report	Schachner 60'

De Kuip, Rotterdam
Attendance: 50,751
Referee: Luigi Agnolin (Italy)

7 May 1985

Austria	4 – 0	Cyprus
Hrstic 2'; Polster 35'; Schachner 53'; Willfurth 71'	Report

Liebenau Stadium, Graz
Attendance: 9,661
Referee: Alan Snoddy (Northern Ireland)

14 May 1985

Hungary	0 – 1	Netherlands
	Report	De Wit 69'

Népstadion, Budapest
Attendance: 71,647
Referee: Karl-Josef Assenmacher (West Germany)

== Goalscorers ==
4 goals

- (Netherlands) Wim Kieft

3 goals

- (Austria) Walter Schachner

2 goals

- (Hungary) Lajos Détári
- (Hungary) Márton Esterházy
- (Hungary) József Kiprich
- (Hungary) Tibor Nyilasi
- (Netherlands) Dick Schoenaker

1 goal

- (Austria) Martin Gisinger
- (Austria) Peter Hrstic
- (Austria) Toni Polster
- (Austria) Herbert Prohaska
- (Austria) Gerald Willfurth
- (Cyprus) Paschalis Christophorou
- (Cyprus) Kostas Foti
- (Cyprus) Panayiotis Marangos
- (Hungary) József Kardos
- (Hungary) Antal Nagy
- (Hungary) Antal Róth
- (Hungary) László Szokolai
- (Netherlands) Peter Houtman
- (Netherlands) Erwin Koeman
- (Netherlands) Marco van Basten
- (Netherlands) Rob de Wit

1 own goal

- (Cyprus) Nikos Pantziaras (playing against the Netherlands)
- (Netherlands) Michel Valke (playing against Austria)
