= National Stadium, Ta' Qali =

Stadium in Ta' Qali, Malta

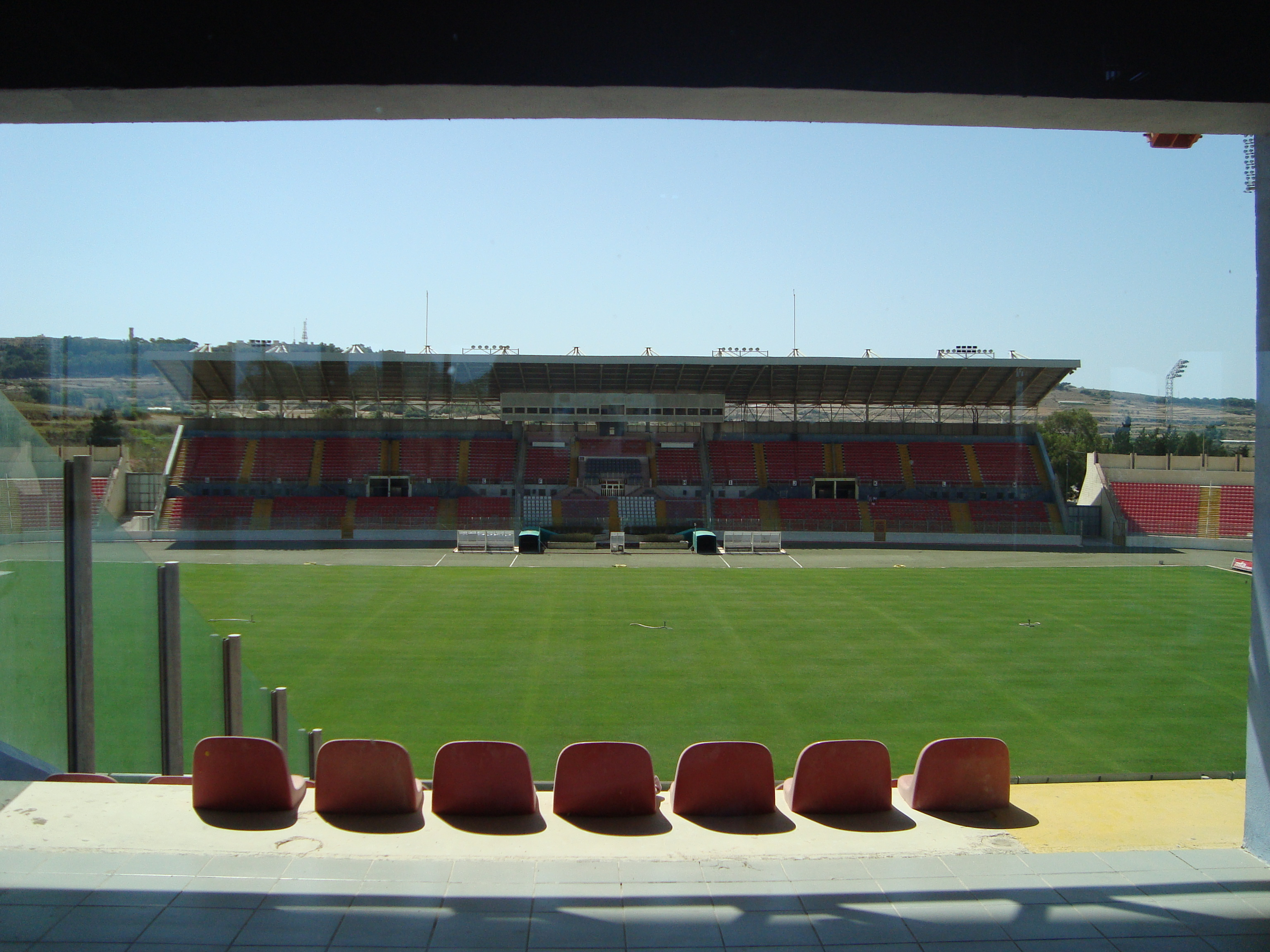
- Interactive map of National Stadium, Ta' Qali
- Full name: Maltese: Grawnd Nazzjonali; English: National Stadium
- Location: Malta
- Coordinates: 35°53′42″N 14°24′55″E
- Capacity: 16,907
- Executive suites: 6
- Surface: GrassMaster
- Record attendance: 35,102; Malta 2–3 West Germany; 1986 World Cup Qualifier; 16 December 1984
- Field size: 105 m × 68 m (344 ft × 223 ft)

Construction
- Opened: 1981; 45 years ago
- Renovated: 2016–2017

Tenants
- Malta national football team (1982–present); Maltese Premier League

The National Stadium, locally also referred to as Ta' Qali, officially known as Grawnd Nazzjonali (Maltese for National Stadium), is a stadium located in Ta' Qali, Malta. The stadium, which also contains the headquarters of the Malta Football Association, seats 16,997 people and is, by far, the largest stadium in the country. It serves as the national football stadium of Malta and is the home stadium of the Malta national football team. The stadium, together with three other stadiums, also hosts the Maltese Premier League.

== History ==
=== Background and early years ===
Although officially the new stadium was inaugurated on 6 December 1981 with a Maltese Premier League encounter between Zurrieq F.C. and Senglea Athletic F.C., certain records suggest that the stadium was already up and running by May 1981. Indeed, newspapers extracts indicate that the stadium hosted the final of the first ever national championship organised by the now defunct Malta Football Federation (not to be confused with the Malta Football Association, which at that time was known as the Main Football Association) between Valletta Vanguards FC and Birkirkara St. Joseph Sports Club on 3 May 1981.

The highest ever attendance at the stadium was during a 1986 World Cup Qualifier encounter between Malta and West Germany played on 16 December 1984, when 35,102 people turned up to watch Malta narrowly lose to the runners-up of the previous World Cup.

=== The Millennium Stand ===
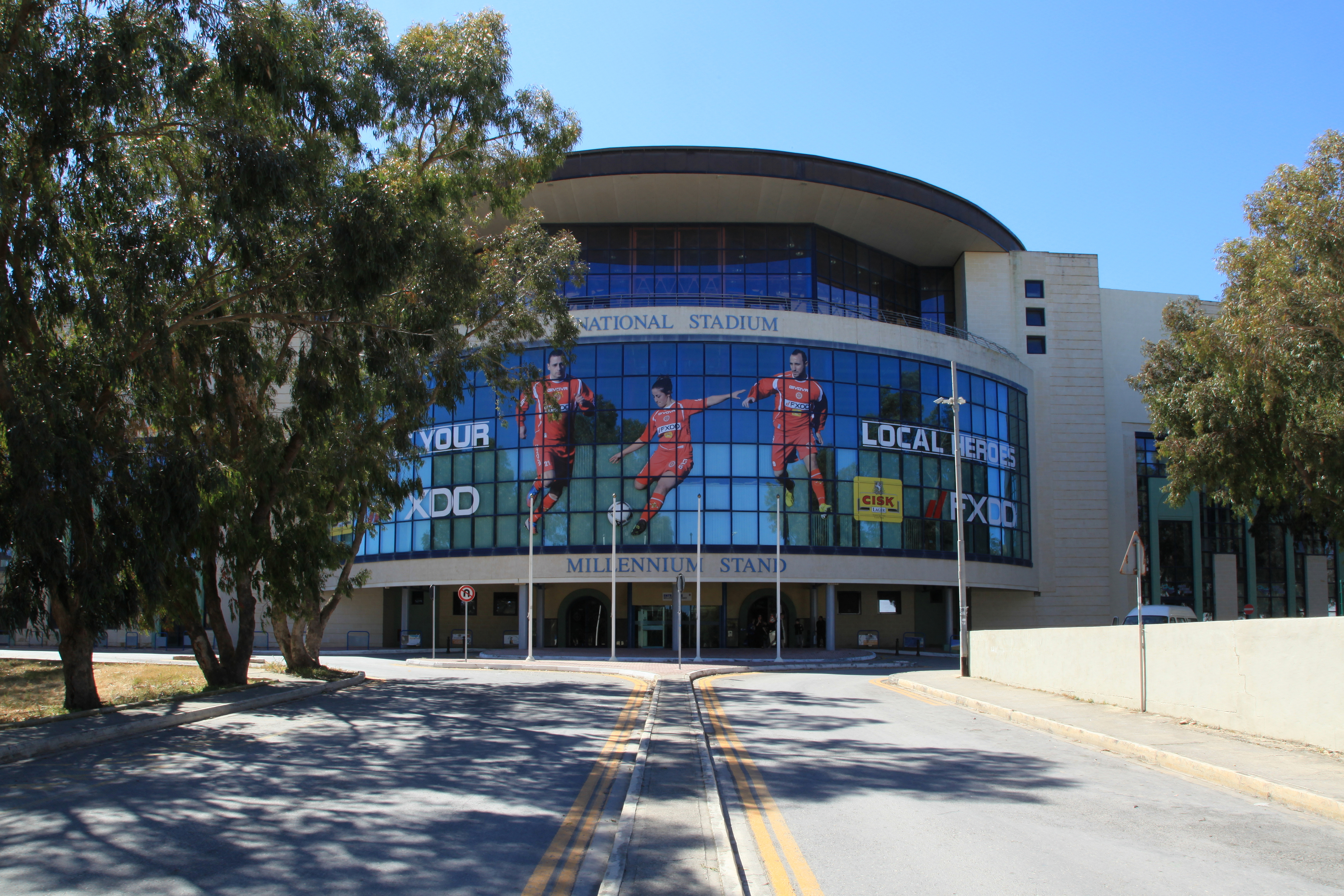
Entrance to the Millennium Stand

On 3 September 2002, the Malta Football Association inaugurated the Millennium Stand. The Millennium Stand replaced the 5,000 seater East Stand, which had been declared as a dangerous structure for a number of years by then and hence had to be demolished. The construction of the Millennium Stand, which cost Lm3.5 million, was regarded as the "biggest infrastructural project ever undertaken by the Malta Football Association" whereas the stand itself has been described as "the jewel in the Malta FA's crown".

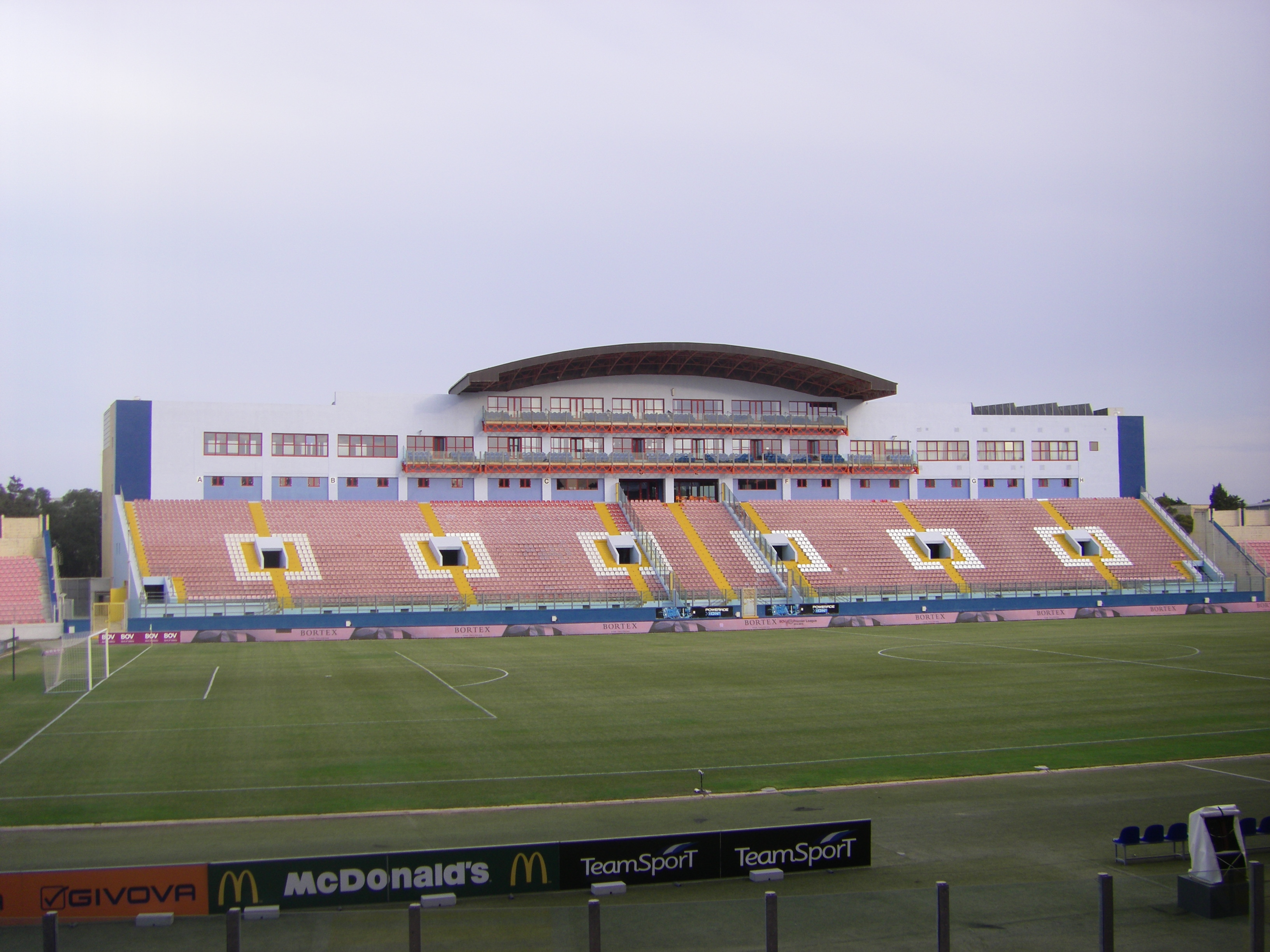
At the Main Stand

=== Pitch resurfacing ===
In 2016, the Maltese Football Association announced a €1.5 million project to replace the old grass surface with a modern hybrid grass surface, with the former having been in service for 35 years. The project was conducted by SIS Pitches who are renowned for other works such as the Vodafone Arena and iPro Stadium. The expenses were partly financed by UEFA and FIFA, with the rest being covered by the MFA.

=== Future ===
In July 2017, during the annual general meeting, the Malta Football Association announced five projects. Two of these projects, which also include the construction of new futsal hall and a parking adjacent to the Enclosure (West Stand), entail the re-development of the North and South Stands. A short clip shared by the association on its Facebook page suggests that the space behind both the goals will be removed and the two stands will be moved closer to the pitch. The re-development also entails removal of the corners, making stadium an "English-style" venue.

In January 2026, the Malta Football Association launched a stakeholder consultation for the re-development of the Ta' Qali Sports Complex. The planned redevelopment entails the re-construction of the Enclosure (West Stand) and the North and South Stands, and the construction of four canopies covering each stand, and will see the capacity of the stadium reduced to 12,000.

== Events ==
=== UEFA European Under-17 Championship ===
The National Stadium was Malta's main venue during its hosting of the 2014 UEFA European Under-17 Championship. The stadium hosted 7 matches in all, including the opening ceremony, 3 group stage games, the semi-finals and the final. 9,422 people turned up to watch England win the championship by beating the Netherlands on penalties.

=== Games of the Small States of Europe ===
The Xth edition of the Games of the Small States of Europe was held in Malta and the National Stadium was chosen to hold the Opening Ceremony. The Opening Ceremony was spectacular as colour, dance and fireworks made the evening a memorable one for those present at the stadium.

== See also ==
- List of football stadiums in Malta
