= Dick Schoenaker =

Dutch association football player

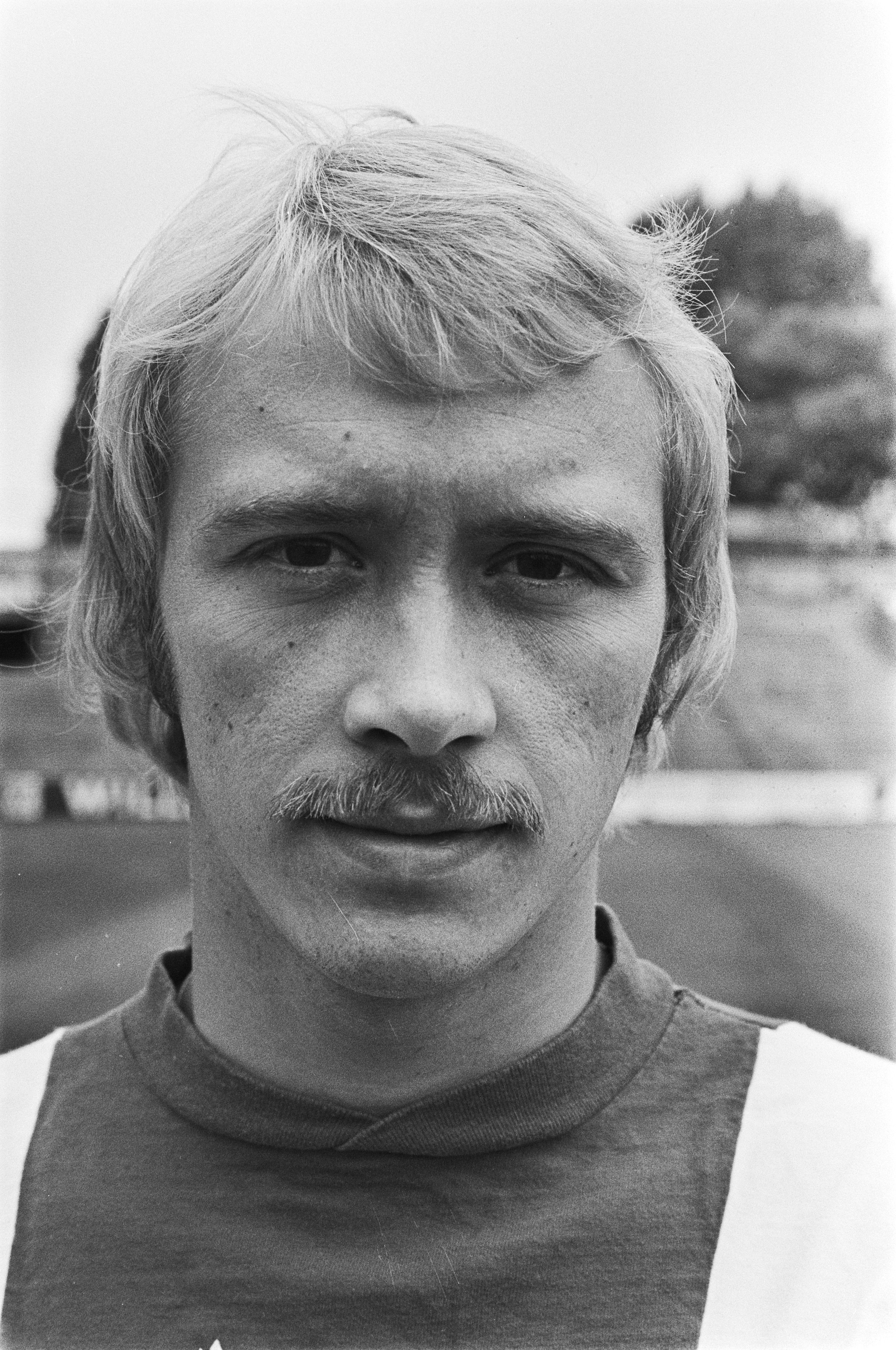
- Schoenaker in 1976

Personal information
- Full name: Dirk Hendrikus Schoenaker
- Date of birth: 30 November 1952 (age 73)
- Place of birth: Ede, Netherlands
- Position: Midfielder

Senior career*
Years	Team	Apps	(Gls)
1973–1974	FC Wageningen	13	(1)
1974–1976	De Graafschap	73	(10)
1976–1985	Ajax	271	(86)
1985–1986	FC Twente	33	(1)
1986–1988	Vitesse	56	(6)
Total		446	(104)

International career
1978–1985	Netherlands	13	(6)
Medal record
Representing Netherlands
FIFA World Cup
Runner-up	1978 Argentina
- * Club domestic league appearances and goals

Dirk "Dick" Hendrikus Schoenaker (born 30 November 1952) is a retired Dutch football midfielder, who represented the Netherlands at the 1978 FIFA World Cup in Argentina, wearing the number three jersey.

== Career ==
His football-career started at Wageningen and De Graafschap Doetinchem. He was bought by Ajax Amsterdam by leaving Ajax-coach Rinus Michels at the end of the 1975/1976 season. He went to Ajax summer 1976, simultaneously with Hans Erkens and Johan Zuidema and has been by far the most successful of the 3 midfielders, their first Ajax-coach being Tomislav Ivic. Schoenaker displayed unbridled energy at the midfield, a rumbled ability to run, the vigour as attacking midfielder to disturb players of the opponent (defensive work) sometimes reconquering balls, achieved a high quote in scored goals per match and had been a very sporting player.

Schoenaker was captain of Ajax during the 1983–1984 and 1984–1985 seasons.

European successes were scarce during this period; the two best achievements were: a semi-final finish in the European Champions Cup during the 1979–80 season, and a quarter-final finish in the European Champions Cup I during the 1977–78 season. During the 1978–79 season Ajax was eliminated in the 3rd round of UEFA Cup, and during the 1984–85 season Red Boys Differdange was beaten 14–0 (return match 1st round UEFA Cup), a Dutch record, but in the 2nd round of that tournament Ajax was eliminated.

In the summer of 1985, Schoenaker went to play for FC Twente, where he ended his career.

Schoenaker obtained a total number of thirteen caps, scoring six goals.

== Career statistics ==
=== International ===
Appearances and goals by national team and year
National team	Year	Apps	Goals
Netherlands	1978	1	0
Netherlands	1979	1	0
Netherlands	1980	3	0
Netherlands	1981	0	0
Netherlands	1982	3	4
Netherlands	1983	2	0
Netherlands	1984	0	0
Netherlands	1985	3	2
Total		13	6

Scores and results list the Netherlands' goal tally first, score column indicates score after each Schoenaker goal.

List of international goals scored by Dick Schoenaker
No.	Date	Venue	Opponent	Score	Result	Competition
1	1 September 1982	Laugardalsvöllur, Reykjavík, Iceland	Iceland	1–1	1–1	UEFA Euro 1984 qualification
2	22 September 1982	De Kuip, Rotterdam, Netherlands	Republic of Ireland	1–0	2–1	UEFA Euro 1984 qualification
3	19 December 1982	Tivoli Stadium, Aachen, Germany	Malta	4–0	6–0	UEFA Euro 1984 qualification
4	19 December 1982	Tivoli Stadium, Aachen, Germany	Malta	5–0	6–0	UEFA Euro 1984 qualification
5	27 February 1985	De Meer, Amsterdam, Netherlands	Cyprus	3–1	7–1	1986 FIFA World Cup qualification
6	27 February 1985	De Meer, Amsterdam, Netherlands	Cyprus	7–1	7–1	1986 FIFA World Cup qualification

== Honours ==
Ajax

- Eredivisie: 1976-77, 1978-79, 1979-80, 1981-82, 1982-83, 1984-85
- KNVB Cup: 1978-79, 1982-83; runner-up: 1977-78, 1978-80, 1980-81

Netherlands

- FIFA World Cup: runner-up 1978
