= Josef Novák =

Czech footballer (born 1956)

Personal information
- Date of birth: 29 July 1956 (age 70)
- Place of birth: Žacléř, Czechoslovakia
- Position: Defender

Senior career*
Years	Team	Apps	(Gls)
1975–1988	Dukla Prague	199	(6)

International career
1985–1987	Czechoslovakia	12	(2)
- * Club domestic league appearances and goals

Josef Novák (born 29 July 1956) is a retired football defender.

During his club career, Novák played solely for Dukla Prague, for whom he made 199 Czechoslovak First League appearances, and scored 6 goals. He won league titles in 1978–79 and 1981–82, as well as the Czechoslovak Cup in 1982–83 and 1984–85.

Internationally Novák amassed 12 caps for the Czechoslovakia national team, scoring 2 goals. He scored his first national team goal in the final match of the 1986 FIFA World Cup qualification – UEFA Group 2 in Munich against West Germany, which finished 2–2. His second goal came in a 1–1 friendly draw against Australia in Melbourne in August 1986.
