= Roddy Forsyth =

Scottish journalist and broadcaster

Roderick Forsyth is a Scottish football journalist, commentator, author and broadcaster. He has written extensively on Scottish football since the 1980s.

Forsyth is also a former presenter of Sportscene, BBC Scotland's flagship TV football highlights programme. He was formerly football correspondent for BBC Scotland and is currently correspondent for the Telegraph group.

Born in Glasgow, Forsyth has been one of the most familiar faces and voices on TV and radio for almost 40 years. He has authored books on Scotland's two most successful clubs, Celtic F.C. and Rangers F.C., as well as The Only Game: Scots and World Football (1990).

In June 2023, Forsyth, who has Parkinson's disease, announced that he was retiring after 40 years work for BBC Sport.
