= Rob de Wit (footballer) =

Dutch footballer

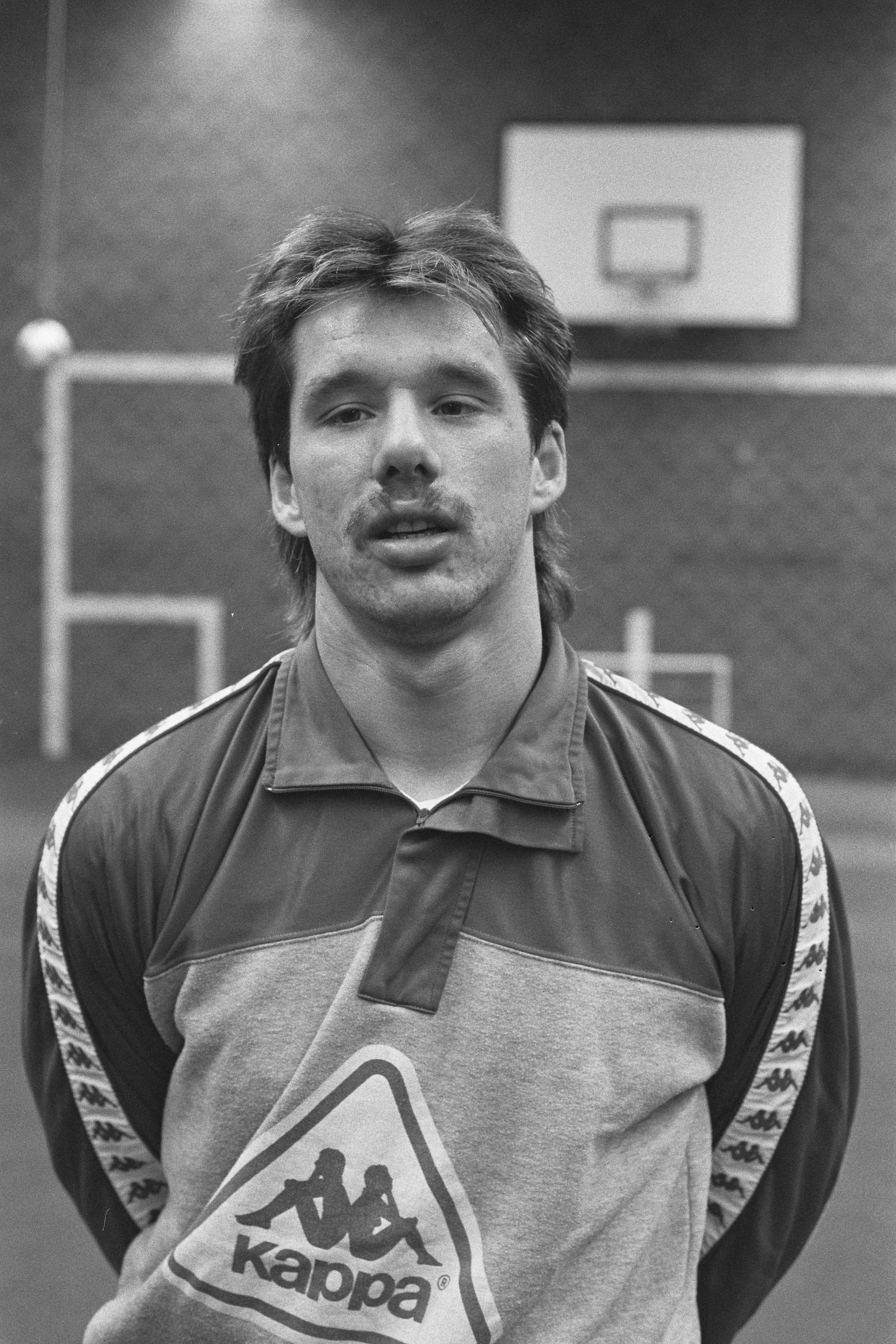
- Rob de Wit in 1987

Personal information
- Full name: Rob de Wit
- Date of birth: 8 September 1963 (age 63)
- Place of birth: Utrecht, Netherlands
- Position: Winger

Youth career
- FC Utrecht

Senior career*
Years	Team	Apps	(Gls)
1982–1984	FC Utrecht	43	(7)
1984–1986	Ajax	63	(16)

International career
1985–1986	Netherlands	8	(3)
- * Club domestic league appearances and goals

Robertus Leonardus "Rob" de Wit (born 8 September 1963) is a Dutch former football player.

== Career ==
De Wit made his debut for FC Utrecht in the 1982–83 season. He was a member of the Dutch squad at the 1983 FIFA World Youth Championship. He was transferred to Ajax Amsterdam in July 1984, as successor of left wing attacker Jesper Olsen, who left to Manchester United. At Ajax, he quickly became a crowd favourite, and played nearly all league matches in the 1984–1985 and 1985–1986 seasons.

In May 1985, still in his first season at Ajax, De Wit made his debut for the Dutch national team in a World Cup qualifier against Austria. Nearly two weeks later, De Wit scored the winning goal against Hungary (0–1 away win), which helped the Netherlands secure a play-off match against Belgium for the 1986 FIFA World Cup.

== Health ==
De Wit's career came to an abrupt end in 1986, due to a cerebral hemorrhage while on holiday in Spain. At first, the consequences didn't seem to be serious. After an unsuccessful treatment in Sweden, it became clear that Rob de Wit would never play professional football again. De Wit announced his retirement from professional football on 2 February 1988. On Saturday 28 May 1988, Ajax (with some additional players from FC Utrecht) and the Dutch national squad preparing for UEFA Euro 1988 played a testimonial match for Rob de Wit at De Meer Stadium, which the Dutch team won (3-1).

He sustained two more cerebral hemorrhages later in life: one in 1993 and one in January 2005.

De Wit played 106 league matches in four seasons, scoring 23 goals.

== Career statistics ==
Appearances and goals by club, season and competition
Club	Season	League			National Cup		Continental		Total	
Club	Season	Division	Apps	Goals	Apps	Goals	Apps	Goals	Apps	Goals
Utrecht	1982–83	Eredivisie	9	1	—		—		9	1
Utrecht	1983–84	Eredivisie	34	6	2	0	—		36	6
Total			43	7	2	0	—		45	7
Ajax	1984–85	Eredivisie	31	7	3	0	3 (Note: Appearances in UEFA Cup)	0	37	7
Ajax	1985–86	Eredivisie	32	9	6	1	2 (Note: Appearances in European Cup)	0	40	10
Total			63	16	9	1	5	0	77	17
Career total			106	23	11	1	5	0	132	24

=== International ===
Appearances and goals by national team and year
National team	Year	Apps	Goals
Netherlands	1985	5	3
Netherlands	1986	3	0
Total		8	3

Scores and results list the Netherlands' goal tally first, score column indicates score after each De Wit goal.

List of international goals scored by Rob de Wit
No.	Date	Venue	Opponent	Score	Result	Competition
1	14 May 1985	Népstadion, Budapest, Hungary	Hungary	1–0	1–0	1986 FIFA World Cup qualification
2	4 September 1985	Abe Lenstra Stadion, Heerenveen, Netherlands	Bulgaria	1–0	1–0	Friendly
3	20 November 1985	De Kuip, Rotterdam, Netherlands	Belgium	2–0	2–1	1986 FIFA World Cup qualification

== Honours ==
Ajax

- Eredivisie: 1984-85
- KNVB Cup: 1985-86
