= Jari Rantanen =

Finnish footballer (born 1961)

Personal information
- Full name: Jari Rantanen
- Date of birth: 31 December 1961 (age 64)
- Place of birth: Helsinki, Finland
- Height: 1.90 m (6 ft 3 in)
- Position: Striker

Senior career*
Years	Team	Apps	(Gls)
1980–1983	HJK	74	(16)
1983–1984	Estoril Praia	9	(1)
1984–1985	HJK	47	(22)
1985–1986	Beerschot	16	(4)
1986–1987	IFK Göteborg	11	(2)
1987–1989	Leicester City	13	(3)
1989–1990	HJK	17	(3)
1993–1995	FinnPa	50	(18)
1996	HJK	10	(1)
1997	FinnPa	8	(2)
1997–1998	PK-35	3	(0)

International career
1984–1989	Finland	29	(4)
- * Club domestic league appearances and goals

Jari Rantanen (born 31 December 1961 in Helsinki, Finland) is a retired football striker.

During his club career, Rantanen notably played for HJK Helsinki and FinnPa, as well as spells abroad with Estoril Praia, K. Beerschot V.A.C., IFK Göteborg and Leicester City. He also made 29 appearances for the Finland national team, scoring four goals.

== Career statistics ==
=== International goals ===
#	Date	Venue	Opponent	Score	Result	Competition
1.	15 May 1984	Kouvolan keskuskenttä, Kouvola, Finland	Soviet Union	1–3	Lost	Friendly
2.	22 May 1985	Olympic Stadium, Helsinki, Finland	England	1–1	Drew	1986 World Cup qual.
3.	25 September 1985	Ratina Stadium, Tampere, Finland	Turkey	1–0	Won	1986 World Cup qual.
4.	19 May 1988	Olympic Stadium, Helsinki, Finland	Colombia	1–3	Lost	Friendly
Correct as of 7 October 2015
