= Vladislav Lauda =

Czech footballer

Personal information
- Full name: Vladislav Lauda
- Date of birth: 25 January 1955 (age 71)
- Place of birth: Czechoslovakia
- Position: Striker

Senior career*
Years	Team	Apps	(Gls)
1977–1982	Slavia Prague		
1982–1986	Sigma Olomouc	96	(53)
1987–1988	AEL Limassol	29	(15)

International career^{‡}
1985	Czechoslovakia	3	(1)
- * Club domestic league appearances and goals as of 25 November 2010 ‡ National team caps and goals as of 25 November 2010

Vladislav Lauda (born 25 January 1955) is a retired football striker.

During his club career, Lauda played for Slavia Prague, Sigma Olomouc and AEL Limassol. He also made 3 appearances for the Czech national team, scoring 1 goal.
