= Mika Lipponen =

Finnish footballer (born 1964)

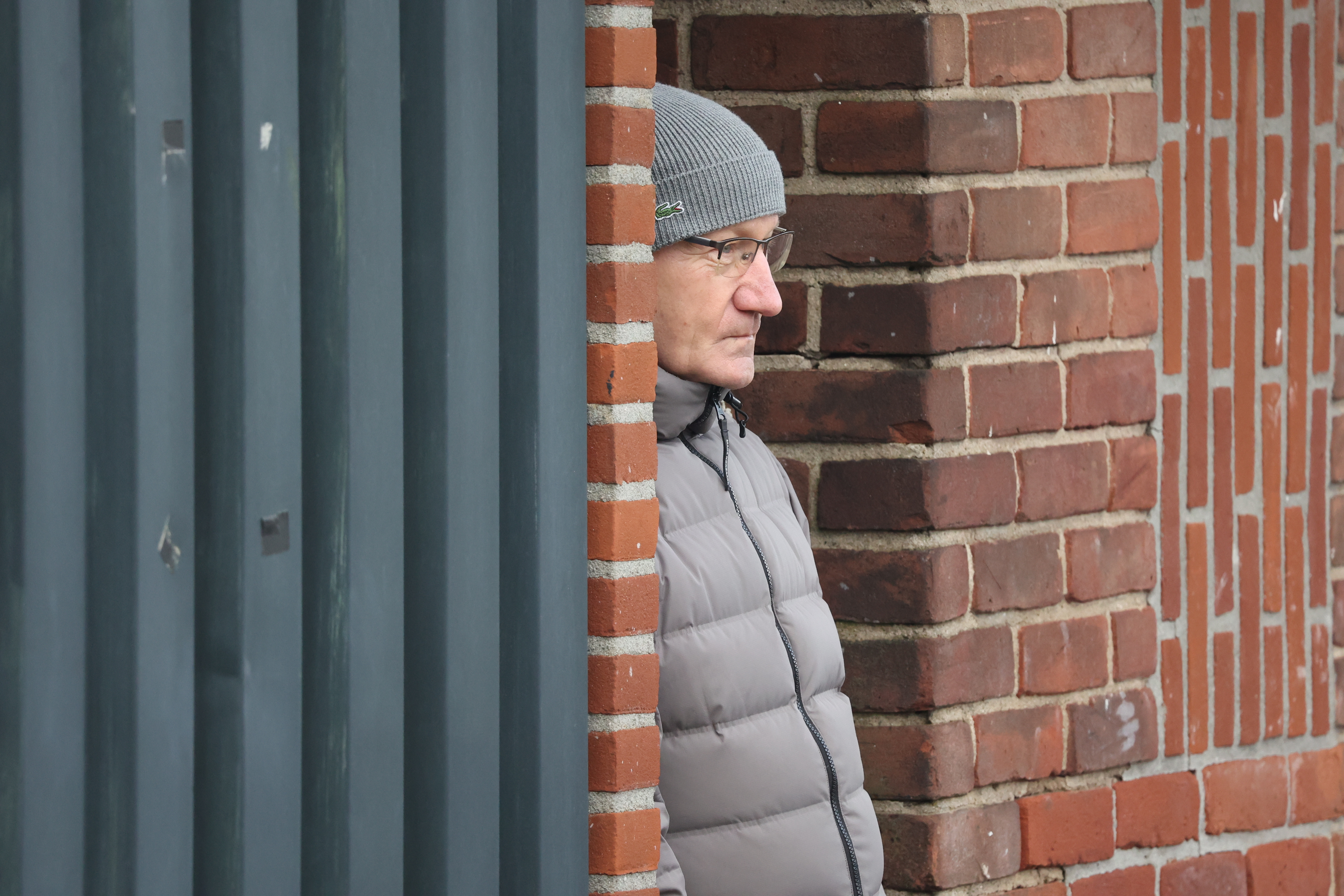

Personal information
- Date of birth: 9 May 1964 (age 62)
- Place of birth: Kaarina, Finland
- Position: Striker

Team information
- Current team: PSV (scout)

Senior career*
Years	Team	Apps	(Gls)
1981–1985	TPS	81	(57)
1985	Real Mallorca	9	(0)
1985–1989	Twente	107	(25)
1989–1992	Aarau	44	(6)
1992	TPS	9	(0)
1993–1995	Emmen	23	(2)

International career
1983–1991	Finland	46	(11)
- * Club domestic league appearances and goals

Mika Lipponen (born 9 May 1964) is a Finnish former footballer.

== Playing career ==
Lipponen played in Finland for TPS, in Spain for Real Mallorca, in the Netherlands for FC Twente and BVO Emmen, and in Switzerland for FC Aarau. He also played for the Finnish national side.

== Later career ==
After working as a scout for Feyenoord for 20 years, in December 2020 he began scouting for PSV.

== Career statistics ==
As of 1 September 2024.

Appearances and goals by club, season and competition
Club	Season	League			Cup (Note: Includes KNVB Beker and Swiss Cup)		Europe		Total	
Club	Season	Division	Apps	Goals	Apps	Goals	Apps	Goals	Apps	Goals
TPS	1981	Mestaruussarja	12	3	–		–		12	3
TPS	1982	Mestaruussarja	5	1	–		–		5	1
TPS	1983	Mestaruussarja	28	22	–		–		28	22
TPS	1984	Mestaruussarja	25	25	–		–		25	25
TPS	1985	Mestaruussarja	11	6	–		–		11	6
TPS	Total		81	57	0	0	0	0	81	57
RCD Mallorca	1985–86	Segunda División	9	0	–		–		9	0
Twente	1985–86	Eredivisie	14	2	1	0	–		15	2
Twente	1986–87	Eredivisie	31	8	2	1	–		33	9
Twente	1987–88	Eredivisie	27	10	1	0	–		28	10
Twente	1988–89	Eredivisie	24	3	2	1	–		26	4
Twente	1989–90	Eredivisie	11	2	0	0	2 (Note: Appearances in UEFA Cup)	0	13	2
Twente	Total		107	25	6	2	2	0	115	27
Aarau	1989–90	Swiss Super League	12	3	1	0	–		13	3
Aarau	1990–91	Swiss Super League	17	2	0	0	–		17	2
Aarau	1991–92	Swiss Super League	15	1	0	0	–		15	1
Aarau	Total		44	6	1	0	0	0	45	6
TPS	1992	Veikkausliiga	9	0	0	0	2 (Note: Appearances in UEFA Cup Winners' Cup)	0	11	0
Emmen	1993–94	Eerste Divisie	23	2	1	0	–		24	2
Career total			273	90	8	2	4	0	295	92
