= Jan Keizer (referee) =

Dutch football referee (1940–2024)

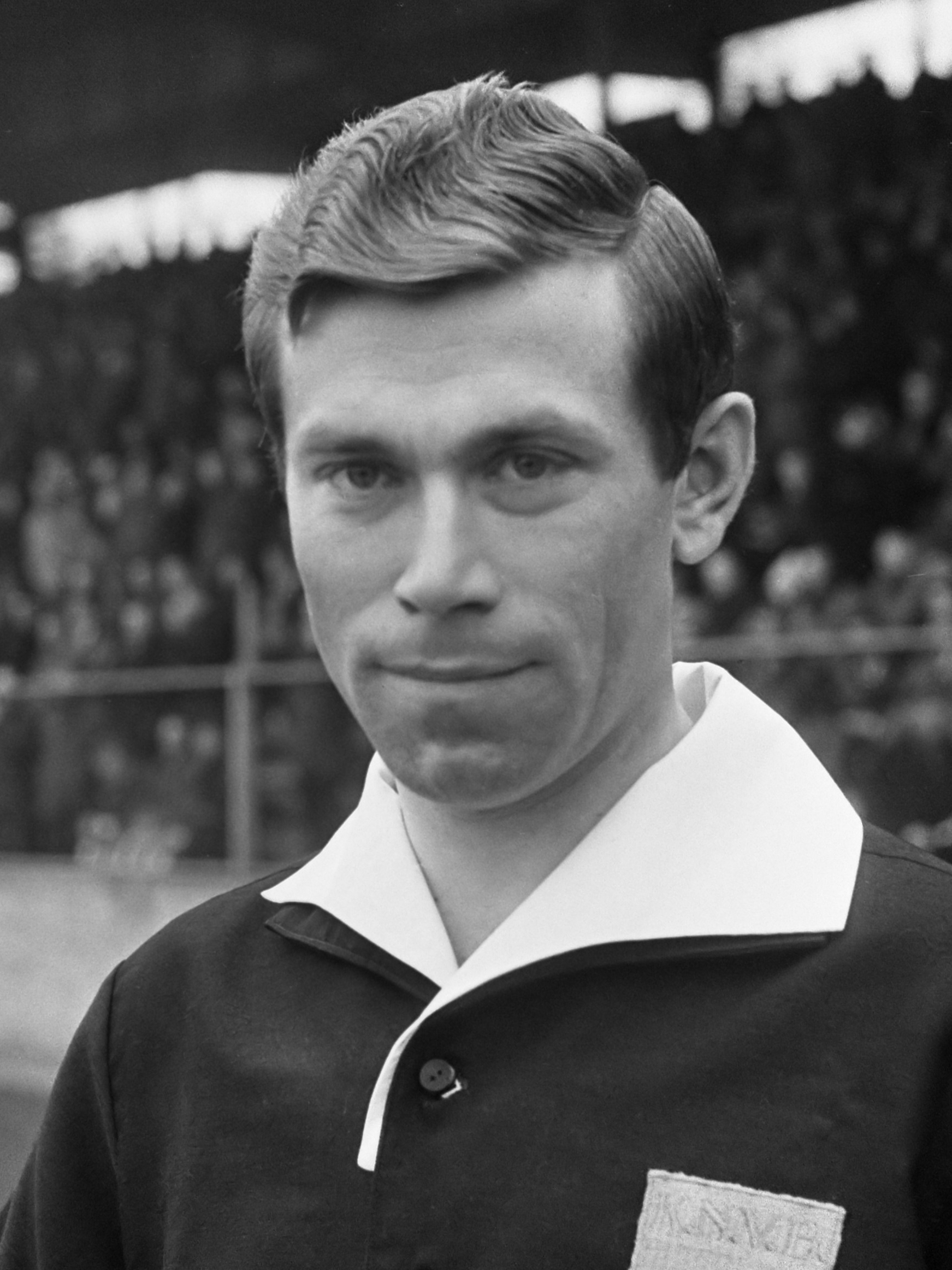
- Keizer in 1968
- Full name: Johannes Nicolaus Ignacius Keizer
- Born: 6 October 1940; Volendam, German-occupied Netherlands
- Died: 18 November 2024 (aged 84)

Domestic
Years	League	Role
1965–1989	Eredivisie	Referee

International
Years	League	Role
1972–1989	FIFA-listed	Referee

Johannes "Jan" Nicolaus Ignacius Keizer (6 October 1940 – 18 November 2024) was a Dutch football referee. He refereed two matches in the 1986 FIFA World Cup in Mexico, and one match in the 1984 UEFA European Football Championship in France.

Keizer was a FIFA referee during the period from 1974, to 1987. He officiated the final at the 1984 Olympic tournament between France and Brazil, and served as a referee in the 1983 FIFA World Youth Championship, UEFA Euro 1980 qualifying, UEFA Euro 1984 qualifying, UEFA Euro 1988 qualifying, 1978 FIFA World Cup qualification, 1982 World Cup qualification, and 1986 World Cup qualification.

Keizer died on 18 November 2024, at the age of 84.
