= Michel Valke =

Dutch footballer

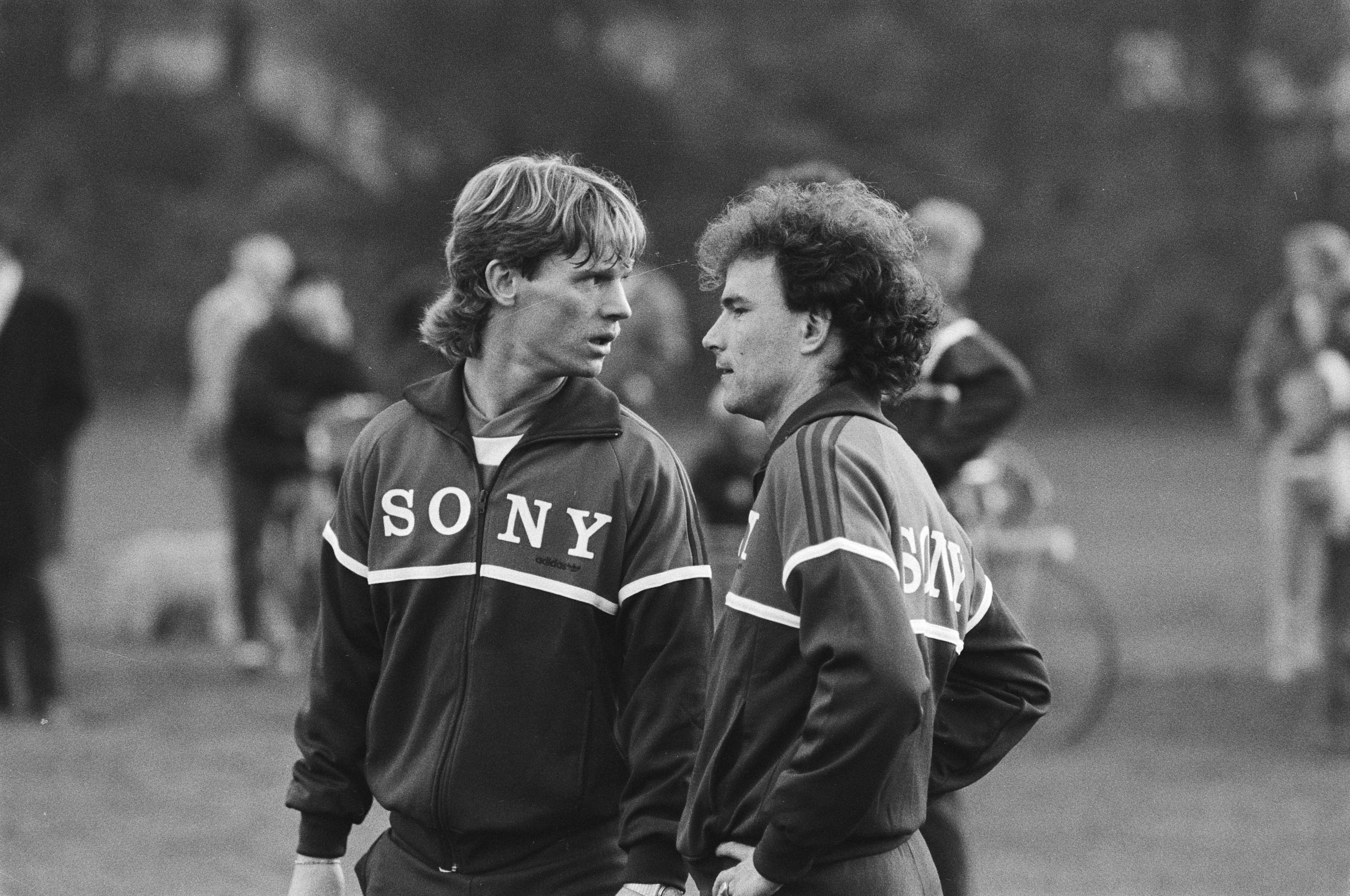
- Mario Been and Michel Valke (1984)

Personal information
- Full name: Michel Valke
- Date of birth: 24 August 1959 (age 67)
- Place of birth: Zwijndrecht, Netherlands
- Position: Midfielder

Youth career
- Grote Lindt
- DFC

Senior career*
Years	Team	Apps	(Gls)
1976–1979	Sparta Rotterdam	67	(2)
1979–1982	PSV Eindhoven	82	(7)
1982–1983	Feyenoord	32	(5)
1983–1987	PSV Eindhoven	117	(28)
1987–1989	Olympique Lyonnais	32	(4)
1989–1994	Sparta Rotterdam	132	(15)
1994–1995	Dordrecht '90	24	(2)

International career
1979–1986	Netherlands	16	(0)

Managerial career
- 2001–2007: Feyenoord (youth coach)
- * Club domestic league appearances and goals

Michel Valke (born 24 August 1959) is a Dutch former footballer who played as a midfielder. Valke made his professional debut at Sparta Rotterdam and also played for PSV Eindhoven, Feyenoord Rotterdam, Olympique Lyonnais and Dordrecht'90. He was capped 16 times for the Netherlands.

== Honours ==
PSV Eindhoven

- Eredivisie winner: 1985–86, 1986–87
