= Guðmundur Þorbjörnsson =

Icelandic footballer and coach

Personal information
- Date of birth: 19 April 1957 (age 69)
- Position: Forward

Senior career*
| Years | Team | Apps | (Gls) |
| 1973–1985 | Valur | | |
| 1985–1987 | Baden | | |

International career
| 1976–1985 | Iceland | | |
- * Club domestic league appearances and goals

Guðmundur Þorbjörnsson (born 19 April 1957) is a retired Icelandic footballer and coach. a forward, he played most of his career in Valur and also coached the team in 1989. He made 37 caps for Iceland and scored seven goals.
