= Magnús Bergs =

Icelandic footballer (born 1956)

Personal information
- Full name: Magnús Helgi Jónsson Bergs
- Date of birth: 27 August 1956 (age 70)
- Place of birth: Reykjavík, Iceland
- Position: Midfielder

Senior career*
Years	Team	Apps	(Gls)
1974–1980	Valur	86	(17)
1980–1982	Borussia Dortmund	2	(0)
1982–1983	K.S.K. Tongeren	37	(5)
1983–1984	Racing de Santander	18	(6)
1984–1985	Eintracht Braunschweig	6	(0)
1988	Þróttur	11	(0)
1990	Stjarnan	14	(1)

International career
1974	Iceland U19	2	(0)
1980–1985	Iceland	16	(2)
- * Club domestic league appearances and goals

Magnús Helgi Jónsson Bergs (born 27 August 1956) is an Icelandic former international footballer who played as a midfielder. He won 16 caps and scored two goals for the Iceland national football team between 1980 and 1985. During his career he played for clubs in Iceland, Germany, Belgium and Spain.

== Personal life ==
Magnús was born in the Icelandic capital, Reykjavík, on 27 August 1956, the son of Jón Helgason Bergs and Gyða Scheving. He graduated from the Menntaskólinn í Reykjavík in 1976, and attained a degree in civil engineering from the University of Iceland four years later. Magnús married Jóhanna Hreinsdóttir, a pastor's daughter, on 30 August 1980. The couple had three children—Gyða (born 1983), Steinunn (born 1985) and Hreinn (born 1991)—but later divorced.

== Club career ==
Away from his career as an engineer, Magnús was a keen footballer. He started his senior career with Reykjavík-based club Valur in 1974, and spent six years there before moving to Germany to join Borussia Dortmund. However, he made only two league appearances in two seasons and subsequently joined Belgian side K.S.K. Tongeren in 1982. The following summer, Magnús switched countries again; he signed for Spanish club Racing de Santander, where he spent a single season. In 1984, he returned to German football with Eintracht Braunschweig, but was again with the club for only one year, and played just six matches for them. Magnús then returned to Iceland, where he had spells with Þróttur and Stjarnan before retiring in 1990.

== International career ==
While playing for Valur, Magnús was called up to the Iceland national under-19 side in 1974 and won two caps for the team.

Magnús made his debut for the senior national team on 25 June 1980 in the 1–1 draw with Finland at the Laugardalsvöllur. On 27 May 1981, he scored his first international goal in the 6–1 defeat away to Czechoslovakia in a qualifying match for the 1982 FIFA World Cup. Despite winning a further five caps that year, he then spent almost three years out of the Iceland team. Upon his return to the national side in September 1984, he scored the only goal of the game in the 1–0 home win against Wales. Magnús went on to win a total of 16 caps for his country. His final game for Iceland came on 12 June 1985, in the 2–1 loss to Spain.
