= 1972–77 Nordic Football Championship =

Tournament details
- Host countries: Denmark; Finland; Norway; Sweden
- Dates: 28 May 1972 – 18 August 1977
- Teams: 4

Final positions
- Champions: Sweden (9th title)
- Runners-up: Denmark
- Third place: Norway
- Fourth place: Finland

Tournament statistics
- Matches played: 24
- Goals scored: 61 (2.54 per match)
- Top scorer(s): (Sweden) Conny Torstensson (4 goals)

The 1972–77 Nordic Football Championship was the eleventh Nordic Football Championship staged. Four Nordic countries participated: Denmark, Finland, Norway and Sweden. Sweden won the tournament, its ninth Nordic Championship win.

== Results ==
=== 1972 ===
28 May 1972

Finland	0-0	Norway
	Report

Kupittaan Jalkapallostadion, Turku
Attendance: 4,828
Referee: Curt Nystrand (Sweden)
7 June 1972

Denmark	3-0	Finland
Kristensen 46', 83'; Bjerre 87'

Idrætsparken, Copenhagen
Attendance: 22,300
Referee: Rolf Hennum Andersen (Norway)
29 June 1972

Sweden	2-0	Denmark
Larsson 2'; Sandberg 33'

Malmö Stadion, Malmö
Attendance: 27,263
Referee: Amders Mattson (Finland)
17 September 1972

Norway	1-3	Sweden
Fuglset 59' (pen.)	Report	Edström 14', 60'; Larsson 86'

Ullevaal Stadion, Oslo, Norway
Attendance: 11,694
Referee: Kurt Ohlsen (Denmark)

=== 1973 ===
21 June 1973

Denmark	1-0	Norway
Dahl 11'

Idrætsparken, Copenhagen
Attendance: 22,300
Referee: Rolf Arnshed (Sweden)
8 July 1973

Sweden	1-1	Finland
Leback 41'		Suomalainen 46'

Örjans Vall, Halmstad
Attendance: 16,547
Referee: Henry Øberg (Norway)
29 August 1973

Finland	1-2	Sweden
Suhonen 34'		Torstensson 49'; Svensson 88'

Helsingin Olympiastadion, Helsinki
Attendance: 18,552
Referee: Edgar Pedersen (Denmark)
23 September 1973

Norway	0-1	Denmark
	Report	H. E. Hansen 32'

Lerkendal Stadion, Trondheim
Attendance: 15,100
Referee: Georg Krutelew (Finland)

=== 1974 ===
3 June 1974

Denmark	0-2	Sweden
		Sandberg 26'; Torstensson 87'

Idrætsparken, Copenhagen
Attendance: 41,100
Referee: Olavi Peltola (Finland)
6 June 1974

Finland	1-1	Denmark
Paatelainen 71'		Pettersson 42'

Raatti, Oulu
Attendance: 10,500
Referee: Egil Bergstad (Norway)
8 August 1974

Sweden	2-1	Norway
Fredriksson 53'; Tapper 67'	Report	Hestad 37'

Ullevi, Gothenburg
15 August 1974

Norway	1-2	Finland
Johansen 73'	Report	Heiskanen 31'; Paatelainen 37'

Ullevaal Stadion, Oslo
Attendance: 11,000
Referee: Erik Fredriksson (Sweden)

=== 1975 ===
15 May 1975

Finland	3-5	Norway
Toivola 4', 67'; Heiskanen 65'	Report	Kvia 14' (pen.), 86'; Skuseth 49'; Lund 83'; Thunberg 85'

Helsinki Olympic Stadium, Helsinki
Attendance: 12,031
Referee: Erik Fredriksson (Sweden)
25 June 1975

Denmark	2-0	Finland
Bjørnmose 14'; Vihtilä 86' (o.g.)

Idrætsparken, Copenhagen
Attendance: 13,600
Referee: Erik Axelryd (Sweden)
25 September 1975

Sweden	0-0	Denmark

Malmö Stadion, Malmö
Attendance: 22,187
Referee: Svein-Inge Thime (Norway)

=== 1976 ===
1 June 1976

Finland	0-2	Sweden
		Torstensson 49'; Linderoth 58'

Helsingin Olympiastadion, Helsinki
Attendance: 16,116
Referee: Ivar Fredriksen (Norway)
24 June 1976

Norway	0-0	Denmark

Brann Stadion, Bergen
Attendance: 15,000
Referee: Ulf Eriksson (Sweden)
11 August 1976

Sweden	6-0	Finland
Sjöberg 26', 56'; Ljungberg 39' (pen.); Werner 59' (pen.); Nilsson 81'; Börjesson 82'	Report

Malmö Stadion, Malmö
Attendance: 11,737
Referee: Torben Månsson (Denmark)
25 August 1976

Denmark	3-0	Norway
Røntved 6' (pen.); K. Hansen 40'; H. Hansen 85'

Vejle Stadion, Vejle
Attendance: 9,300
Referee: Mauri Laakso (Finland)
22 September 1976

Norway	3-2	Sweden
Thunberg 4', 17'; Jacobsen 87'		Torstensson 53'; Sjöberg 82'

Ullevaal Stadion, Oslo
Attendance: 23,000
Referee: Gunnar Hellgren (Finland)

=== 1977 ===
26 May 1977

Sweden	1-0	Norway
Linderoth 66'	Report

Ullevi, Gothenburg
Attendance: 12,836
Referee: Tapani Sahlström (Finland)
15 June 1977

Denmark	2-1	Sweden
Røntved 48'; Simonsen 71'		Nordin 63'

Idrætsparken, Copenhagen
Attendance: 44,500
Referee: Harry Øberg (Norway)
22 June 1977

Finland	1-2	Denmark
Nieminen 83'		Elkjær 58', 61'

Olympic Stadium, Helsinki
Attendance: 9,800
Referee: Lars Åke Björck (Sweden)
18 August 1977

Norway	1–1	Finland
Iversen 15'	Report	Paatelainen 86'

Ullevaal Stadion, Oslo
Attendance: 10,263
Referee: Poul Jørgen Jensen (Denmark)

== Table ==
The table is compiled by awarding two points for a victory, one point for a draw, and no points for a loss.

	Team	Pld	W	D	L	GF	GA	GD	Pts
1	Sweden	12	8	2	2	24	9	+15	18
2	Denmark	12	7	3	2	15	7	+8	17
3	Norway	12	2	3	7	12	19	–7	7
4	Finland	12	1	4	7	10	26	–16	6

== Winners ==
1968–71 Nordic Football Championship winners

Sweden
Ninth title

== Statistics ==
=== Goalscorers ===
There were 61 goals scored in 24 matches, for an average of 2.54 goals per match.

4 goals

- (Sweden) Conny Torstensson

3 goals

- (Finland) Matti Paatelainen
- (Norway) Stein Thunberg
- (Sweden) Thomas Sjöberg

2 goals

- (Denmark) Preben Elkjær
- (Denmark) Jørgen Kristensen
- (Denmark) Per Røntved
- (Finland) Aki Heiskanen
- (Finland) Miikka Toivola
- (Norway) Svein Kvia
- (Sweden) Anders Linderoth
- (Sweden) Bo Larsson
- (Sweden) Ralf Edström
- (Sweden) Roland Sandberg

1 goal

- (Denmark) Allan Simonsen
- (Denmark) Bjarne Pettersson
- (Denmark) Hans Ewald Hansen
- (Denmark) Heino Hansen
- (Denmark) Kresten Bjerre
- (Denmark) Kurt Hansen
- (Denmark) Ole Bjørnmose
- (Denmark) Peter Dahl
- (Finland) Jouko Suomalainen
- (Finland) Jyrki Nieminen
- (Finland) Heikki Suhonen
- (Norway) Helge Skuseth
- (Norway) Harry Hestad
- (Norway) Jan Fuglset
- (Norway) Pål Jacobsen
- (Norway) Odd Iversen
- (Norway) Tom Lund
- (Norway) Tor Egil Johansen
- (Sweden) Anders Ljungberg
- (Sweden) Bo Börjesson
- (Sweden) Eine Fredriksson
- (Sweden) Harry Svensson
- (Sweden) Olle Nordin
- (Sweden) Mats Werner
- (Sweden) Staffan Tapper
- (Sweden) Torbjörn Nilsson
- (Sweden) Yngve Leback

1 own goal

- (Finland) Erkki Vihtilä (against Denmark)

== See also ==
Balkan Cup
Baltic Cup
Central European International Cup
Mediterranean Cup

== Sources ==
- Aarhus, Lars; Elbech, Søren & Pietarinen, Heikki (1998-03-27). "Nordic Championships 1972-77". RSSSF.
- "Landsholdsdatabasen - Kampsøgning" (in Danish). DBU. Archived from the original on 2014-09-15.
