= Chupin =

Chupin (masculine, Russian: Чупин) or Chupina (feminine, Russian: Чупина) is a Russian and French surname. Notable people with the surname include:

- Alexei Chupin (born 1972), Russian ice hockey player
- Alfred Chupin (1916–2021), French politician
- Jean-Pierre Chupin (born 1960), French–Canadian architect, researcher, and architectural theorist
- Roger Chupin (1921–2002), French racing cyclist
- Valeri Chupin (born 1961), Russian football coach and former player, father of Yevgeni
- Yevgeni Chupin (born 1980), Russian football player, son of Valeri
