= 1978–80 Nordic Football Championship =

Tournament details
- Host countries: Denmark; Finland; Norway; Sweden
- Dates: 31 May 1978 – 21 August 1980
- Teams: 4

Final positions
- Champions: Denmark (2nd title)
- Runners-up: Sweden
- Third place: Norway
- Fourth place: Finland

Tournament statistics
- Matches played: 12
- Goals scored: 30 (2.5 per match)
- Top scorer: (Norway) Pål Jacobsen (4 goals)

The 1978–80 Nordic Football Championship was the 12th Nordic Football Championship staged. Four Nordic countries participated: Denmark, Finland, Norway and Sweden. Denmark won the tournament, its second Nordic Championship win.

== Results ==
=== 1978 ===
31 May 1978

Norway	1–2	Denmark
Thoresen 25'	Report	Arnesen 41'; Elkjær 63'

Ullevaal, Oslo
Attendance: 9,429
Referee: Laakso (Finland)
28 June 1978
19:00 (UTC+1:00)

Sweden	2–1	Finland
Nilsson 17'; Andersson 80'	Report	Ismail 39'

Ryavallen, Borås
Attendance: 6,600
Referee: Månsson (Denmark)
9 August 1978
19:00 (UTC+2:00)

Finland	1–1	Norway
Johansen 61'	Report	Ismail 79'

Olympic Stadium, Helsinki
Attendance: 7,481
Referee: Marian Kustoń (Poland)
16 August 1978
19:00 (UTC+1:00)

Denmark	2–1	Sweden
Nielsen 10'; Røntved 17'	Report	Berggren 73'

Idrætsparken, Copenhagen
Attendance: 28,100
Referee: Frederiksen (Norway)

=== 1979 ===
28 June 1979
19:00 (UTC+1:00)

Sweden	2–0	Norway
Borg 8'; Nordin 30'	Report

Ullevi Gothenburg
Attendance: 11,432
Referee: Martti Hirviniemi (Finland)
15 August 1979
19:00 (UTC+1:00)

Norway	2–0	Sweden
Økland 60'; Mathisen 85'	Report

Ullevaal Stadion, Oslo
Attendance: 16,495
Referee: Henk Weerink (Netherlands)
29 August 1979
18:00 (UTC+2:00)

Finland	0–0	Denmark
	Report

Mikkelin Urheilupuisto, Mikkeli
Attendance: 4,933
Referee: Ingemar Johansson (Sweden)
26 September 1979

Denmark	1–0	Finland
Elkjær 51'	Report

Idrætsparken, Copenhagen
Attendance: 24,400
Referee: Kaare Lindboe (Norway)

=== 1980 ===
7 May 1980
19:00 (UTC+2:00)

Sweden	0–1	Denmark
	Report	Steffensen 13'

Ullevi, Gothenburg
Attendance: 20,173
Referee: Reidar Bjørnestad (Norway)
22 May 1980
18:30 (UTC+2:00)

Finland	0–2	Sweden
	Report	Nordgren 6'; Sjöberg 31'

Olympic Stadium, Helsinki
Attendance: 9,196
Referee: Ib Nielsen (Denmark)
4 June 1980
19:30 (UTC+2:00)

Denmark	3–1	Norway
Nielsen 68' (pen.); Arnesen 70'; Elkjær 76'	Report	Kollshaugen 21'

Idrætsparken, Copenhagen
Attendance: 22,000
Referee: Geurds (Netherlands)
21 August 1980
19:00 (UTC+2:00)

Norway	6–1	Finland
Jacobsen 30', 39', 73', 83'; Dokken 50'; Aas 61'	Report	Himanka 43'

Ullevaal Stadion, Oslo
Attendance: 10,640
Referee: Kjell Johansson (Sweden)

== Table ==
	Team	Pld	W	D	L	GF	GA	GD	Pts
1	Denmark	6	5	1	0	9	3	+6	11
2	Sweden	6	3	0	3	7	6	+1	6
3	Norway	6	2	1	3	11	9	+2	5
4	Finland	6	0	2	4	3	12	–9	2

== Winners ==
1978–80 Nordic Football Championship winners

Denmark
Second title

== Statistics ==
=== Goalscorers ===
There were 30 goals scored in 12 matches, for an average of 2.5 goals per match.

4 goals

- (Norway) Pål Jacobsen

3 goals

- (Denmark) Preben Elkjær

2 goals

- (Denmark) Benny Nielsen
- (Denmark) Frank Arnesen
- (Finland) Atik Ismail

1 goal

- (Denmark) Jens Steffensen
- (Denmark) Per Røntved
- (Finland) Juhani Himanka
- (Norway) Arne Dokken
- (Norway) Arne Larsen Økland
- (Norway) Hallvar Thoresen
- (Norway) Tor Egil Johansen
- (Norway) Svein Mathisen
- (Norway) Einar Aas
- (Norway) Stein Kollshaugen
- (Sweden) Tommy Berggren
- (Sweden) Thomas Sjöberg
- (Sweden) Olle Nordin
- (Sweden) Magnus Andersson
- (Sweden) Mats Nordgren
- (Sweden) Torbjörn Nilsson
- (Sweden) Hasse Borg

== See also ==
Balkan Cup
Baltic Cup
Central European International Cup
Mediterranean Cup
