= Conny Torstensson =

Swedish footballer

Personal information
- Full name: Jan Conny Torstensson
- Date of birth: 28 August 1949 (age 77)
- Place of birth: Lofta, Sweden
- Height: 1.80 m (5 ft 11 in)
- Positions: Midfielder; forward

Youth career
- Gamleby IF

Senior career*
Years	Team	Apps	(Gls)
1967–1973	Åtvidabergs FF	50	(18)
1973–1977	Bayern Munich	81	(11)
1977–1978	FC Zürich	24	(3)
1978–1980	Åtvidabergs FF	49	(6)
Total		204	(38)

International career
1972	Sweden U21	1	(0)
1972–1979	Sweden	40	(7)

Managerial career
- 1986: Åtvidabergs FF
- * Club domestic league appearances and goals

Jan Conny Torstensson (born 28 August 1949) is a Swedish former professional footballer who played as a midfielder or forward. He represented Åtvidabergs FF, Bayern Munich, and FC Zürich during a career that spanned between 1967 and 1980. A full international between 1972 and 1979, he won 40 caps and scored seven goals for the Sweden national team and represented his country at the 1974 and 1978 editions of the FIFA World Cup.

== Club career ==
=== Åtvidabergs FF ===
Torstensson commenced his career with Åtvidabergs FF in southern Sweden, then a club renowned for its successful youth development. From 1967 onward he featured regularly in the senior team with which he ascended to the first division after the first season. In the following years he was part of the team that defined the golden era of the club, winning the only titles in its history. 1970 and 1971 Åtvidabergs FF won the cup and was twice runner up in the championship, which the club won in 1972 and 1973. In 1973 the club also reached the cup final once more.

In the first round of the 1973–74 European Champions Cup campaign, Åtvidabergs FF encountered Bayern Munich, one of the favourites of the competition with stars like Franz Beckenbauer and Gerd Müller. In Munich, Åtvidaberg lost 1–3. With the aid of two goals by Torstensson, the Swedes achieved the same result in the return leg, albeit losing in the ensuing penalty shoot-out. However, Torstensson impressed the coach and management of Bayern and was speedily transferred for a then impressive sum of 580,000 Marks.

=== Bayern Munich ===
Until 1977 he played in 81 Bundesliga matches for Bayern scoring 11 goals. He impressed most in European Cup matches, where he scored a number of important goals, and won the competition three times consecutively between 1974 and 1976, featuring in the finals of 1974 and 1975. Altogether, he scored 10 goals in 21 European cup matches. A further highlight was the winning of the Intercontinental Cup in the two finals against Cruzeiro EC of Brazil.

=== Later career ===
On club level Torstensson moved 1977 to FC Zürich in Switzerland, returning a year later to Åtvidabergs FF, where he ended his career in 1980.

== International career ==
Torstensson himself debuted 1972 in the Sweden national team. 1974 he participated with Sweden in the World Cup in Germany, reaching the second phase of the tournament, where he scored the winner against Yugoslavia. Four years later he also participated in the World Cup in Argentina. Sweden exited there winless after round one.

== Personal life ==
After his playing years he initially had a position in the packaging industry. Over the years he held various functions at Åtvidabergs FF. In 1986, he coached the club in the second division. Later he was manager with the speedway team – speedway is counted amongst the major sports in Sweden – of Västervik, which in those years became runner-up in the national championship.

In 2015, he lived with his wife Annette, a teacher and local politician with the Centerpartiet at a lake in Borghult, a rural location ca. 25 km north-west of Västervik. The couple has been married since 1971 and has two daughters.

== Career statistics ==
=== International ===
Appearances and goals by national team and year
National team	Year	Apps	Goals
Sweden	1972	1	0
Sweden	1973	10	1
Sweden	1974	9	2
Sweden	1975	4	1
Sweden	1976	6	3
Sweden	1977	5	0
Sweden	1978	4	0
Sweden	1979	1	0
Total		40	7

Scores and results list Sweden's goal tally first, score column indicates score after each Torstensson goal.

List of international goals scored by Conny Torstensson
No.	Date	Venue	Opponent	Score	Result	Competition	Ref.
1	29 August 1973	Helsinki Olympic Stadium, Helsinki, Finland	Finland	1–1	2–1	1972–77 Nordic Football Championship	
2	3 June 1974	Parken, Copenhagen, Denmark	Denmark	2–0	2–0	1972–77 Nordic Football Championship	
3	3 July 1974	Rheinstadion, Düsseldorf, Germany	Yugoslavia	2–1	2–1	1974 FIFA World Cup	
4	3 September 1975	Windsor Park, Belfast, Northern Ireland	Northern Ireland	2–1	2–1	UEFA Euro 1976 qualifier	
5	1 June 1976	Helsinki Olympic Stadium, Helsinki, Finland	Finland	1–0	2–0	1972–77 Nordic Football Championship	
6	8 September 1976	Råsunda Stadium, Solna, Sweden	Hungary	1–1	1–1	Friendly	
7	22 September 1976	Ullevaal Stadium, Oslo, Norway	Norway	1–2	2–3	1972–77 Nordic Football Championship	

== Honours ==
Åtvidabergs FF

- Allsvenskan: 1972, 1973
- Svenska Cupen: 1969–70, 1970–71

Bayern Munich

- Intercontinental Cup: 1976
- European Cup: 1973–74, 1974–75, 1975–76
- Bundesliga: 1973–74

Sweden

- Nordic Football Championship: 1972–77

Individual

- Stor Grabb: 1973
- SvFF Hall of Fame: 2020
- Nordic Football Championship top scorer: 1972–77
