= Olle Nordin =

Swedish football coach and former player (born 1949)

Personal information
- Full name: Carl Jan Olof Nordin
- Date of birth: 23 November 1949 (age 76)
- Place of birth: Älmhult, Sweden
- Position: Midfielder

Senior career*
Years	Team	Apps	(Gls)
1970–1974	IFK Norrköping	98	(25)
1975–1976	IFK Sundsvall		
1977–1980	IFK Göteborg	69	(12)

International career
1970	Sweden U21	5	(4)
1970–1979	Sweden	19	(2)

Managerial career
- 1982–1984: Västra Frölunda IF
- 1985: Vålerenga
- 1986–1990: Sweden
- 1990–1992: Vålerenga
- 1993: Drøbak/Frogn
- 1994–1995: Lyn
- 1995–1996: Al Wasl
- 1997–2000: IFK Norrköping
- 2001–2002: AIK
- 2003–2008: Jönköpings Södra IF
- 2008–2009: Jönköpings Södra IF
- 2016: IFK Malmö
- * Club domestic league appearances and goals

Carl Jan Olof "Olle" Nordin (born 23 November 1949) is a Swedish former football coach and former player.

He represented IFK Norrköping, IFK Sundsvall, and IFK Göteborg during a playing career that spanned between 1970 and 1980. A full international between 1976 and 1979, he won 19 caps for the Sweden national team and represented his country at the 1978 FIFA World Cup.

As a coach, he is best remembered for leading the Sweden national team at the 1990 FIFA World Cup, as well as for his stints with IFK Norrköping and AIK.

== Playing career ==
At the club level, Nordin represented IFK Norrköping, IFK Sundsvall, and IFK Göteborg. He was capped 19 times for the Sweden national team and played at the 1978 FIFA World Cup.

== Coaching career ==
As national team coach, Nordin led Sweden to the 1990 FIFA World Cup — its first World Cup since Nordin participated as a player. The tournament was a failure, however, as Sweden lost all three matches with 1–2. Nordin was fired shortly thereafter. He managed Norwegian clubs (Vålerenga, Lyn) as well as Swedish Västra Frölunda IF, IFK Norrköping and AIK.

The latest club he managed was IFK Malmö in 2016.

== Career statistics ==
=== International ===
Appearances and goals by national team and year
National team	Year	Apps	Goals
Sweden	1970	1	0
Sweden	1971	0	0
Sweden	1972	0	0
Sweden	1973	0	0
Sweden	1974	0	0
Sweden	1975	0	0
Sweden	1976	4	0
Sweden	1977	5	1
Sweden	1978	3	0
Sweden	1979	6	1
Total		19	2

Scores and results list Sweden's goal tally first, score column indicates score after each Nordin goal.

List of international goals scored by Olle Nordin
No.	Date	Venue	Opponent	Score	Result	Competition	Ref.
1	15 June 1977	Parken, Copenhagen, Denmark	Denmark	1–1	1–2	1972–77 Nordic Football Championship	
2	28 June 1979	Ullevi, Gothenburg, Sweden	Norway	2–0	2–0	1978–80 Nordic Football Championship	
