= Ole Frøystad =

Norwegian media personality, teacher and sports supporter

- Born: 1986 or 1987 (age 38–40); Leinøya, Herøy, Norway
- Other name: Mr. Row Row
- Education: Master's degree in sports psychology
- Occupations: Primary school teacher, sports psychologist, content creator
- Years active: 2026–present
- Agent: Egmont People
- Known for: Creator of the Viking Row football chant

Ole Frøystad (born 1986 or 1987), known online as Mr. Row Row, is a Norwegian media personality, primary school teacher and sports psychologist. He became known during the 2026 FIFA World Cup as the creator of the "Viking Row" football chant.

== Background ==
Frøystad is from Leinøya in Herøy, Norway, and later relocated to the Oslo region for his career. He works as a primary school teacher in Bærum municipality.

He also holds a master's degree in sports psychology. During his youth, Frøystad pursued a competitive football career with aspirations of playing for the national team, but was forced to stop due to a career-ending injury.

== The Viking Row ==
Prior to the 2026 World Cup, Frøystad sought to create a chant to unify fans of the Norway men's national football team. Inspired by chants from the Norwegian club Rosenborg BK, he developed the "Viking Row", a synchronized seated chant designed to mimic Vikings preparing for battle by pulling oars.

=== Social media career ===
After collaborating with the Norwegian supporters' club Oljeberget to refine the chant, Frøystad posted an instructional video on his Instagram account, @mr.row.row, following a friendly match against Sweden on 1 June 2026. The video received over 38 million views and nearly 3 million likes, establishing his online alias, "Mr. Row Row." Following his viral presence during the tournament. In July 2026, the Norwegian talent agency Egmont People announced that they had signed Frøystad for professional management representation.

=== "Vikingblod" song ===
In March 2026, Frøystad and other representatives of the supporters' group Oljeberget collaborated with Norwegian artist Petter "Katastrofe" Bjørklund Kristiansen to record a World Cup anthem. The resulting pop track, titled "Vikingblod" (Viking Blood), incorporates the drumbeats and the shouting of the Viking Row chant into its production. Frøystad was present in the studio during the recording process, stating to the press that the goal was to integrate "Norwegian culture and a bit of Viking rawness" into the music. Released by Warner Music Norway on 27 March 2026, the song became one of the most popular tracks in Norway during the Summer and was widely adopted by supporters during the tournament.

=== Royal reception ===
During the return of the Norwegian national football team, Frøystad was part of the Viking Row performance outside the Royal Palace in Oslo, led by Crown Prince Haakon. Frøystad also joined the bus tour with the national team through Karl Johan.

== Media appearances ==
During the 2026 World Cup in North America, Frøystad traveled with Norwegian supporters. His organization of the chant in public spaces, including a gathering of hundreds of fans in Times Square, New York City, led to increased media attention.

Frøystad was interviewed by networks such as ESPN and CNN, as well as official FIFA media. He also appeared on American daytime talk shows, including Good Morning America and The View. During matches, such as in Dallas, Texas, he was featured on stadium video boards leading the chant. In addition to their television appearances, Frøystad and fellow Oljeberget organizer Halvor Viste Berg received invitations to meet with U.S. state governors during the tournament.

At Gillette Stadium in Foxborough, Massachusetts, Frøystad was recorded teaching the chant to American streamer IShowSpeed, which he subsequently posted to his social media channels.

In interviews, Frøystad highlighted the chant's role in promoting unity among fans. He cited a moment in Foxborough where Norwegian fans exchanged the Viking Row with the clapping chant of French supporters. He also stated that he was overwhelmed by the widespread adoption of the chant, noting that he "almost started crying" when the Norwegian national team performed the chant in unison with fans following their match against Senegal.
