= 1978 FIFA World Cup qualification – UEFA Group 6 =

Football tournament qualification stage

Group 6 consisted of three of the 32 teams entered into the European zone: Norway, Sweden, and Switzerland. These three teams competed on a home-and-away basis for one of the 8.5 spots in the final tournament allocated to the European zone. The spot would be assigned to the group's winner.

== Standings ==
Pos	Team	Pld	W	D	L	GF	GA	GD	Pts
1	Sweden	4	3	0	1	7	4	+3	6
2	Norway	4	2	0	2	3	4	−1	4
3	Switzerland	4	1	0	3	3	5	−2	2

== Matches ==
16 June 1976

Sweden	2 – 0	Norway
B. Andersson 27'; Sjöberg 42'	Report

Referee: Corver (Netherlands)

8 September 1976

Norway	1 – 0	Switzerland
Lund 75'	Report

Referee: Rion (Belgium)

9 October 1976

Switzerland	1 – 2	Sweden
Trinchero 40' (pen.)	Report	Börjesson 29'; Sjöberg 73'

Referee: Ok (Turkey)

8 June 1977

Sweden	2 – 1	Switzerland
Sjöberg 69'; Börjesson 77'	Report	Risi 80'

Referee: Wright (Republic of Ireland)

7 September 1977

Norway	2 – 1	Sweden
Ottesen 34'; Iversen 66'	Report	Sjöberg 53'

Referee: Prokop (East Germany)

30 October 1977

Switzerland	1 – 0	Norway
Sulser 29'	Report

Referee: Lipatov (Soviet Union)
