= List of international goals scored by Erling Haaland =

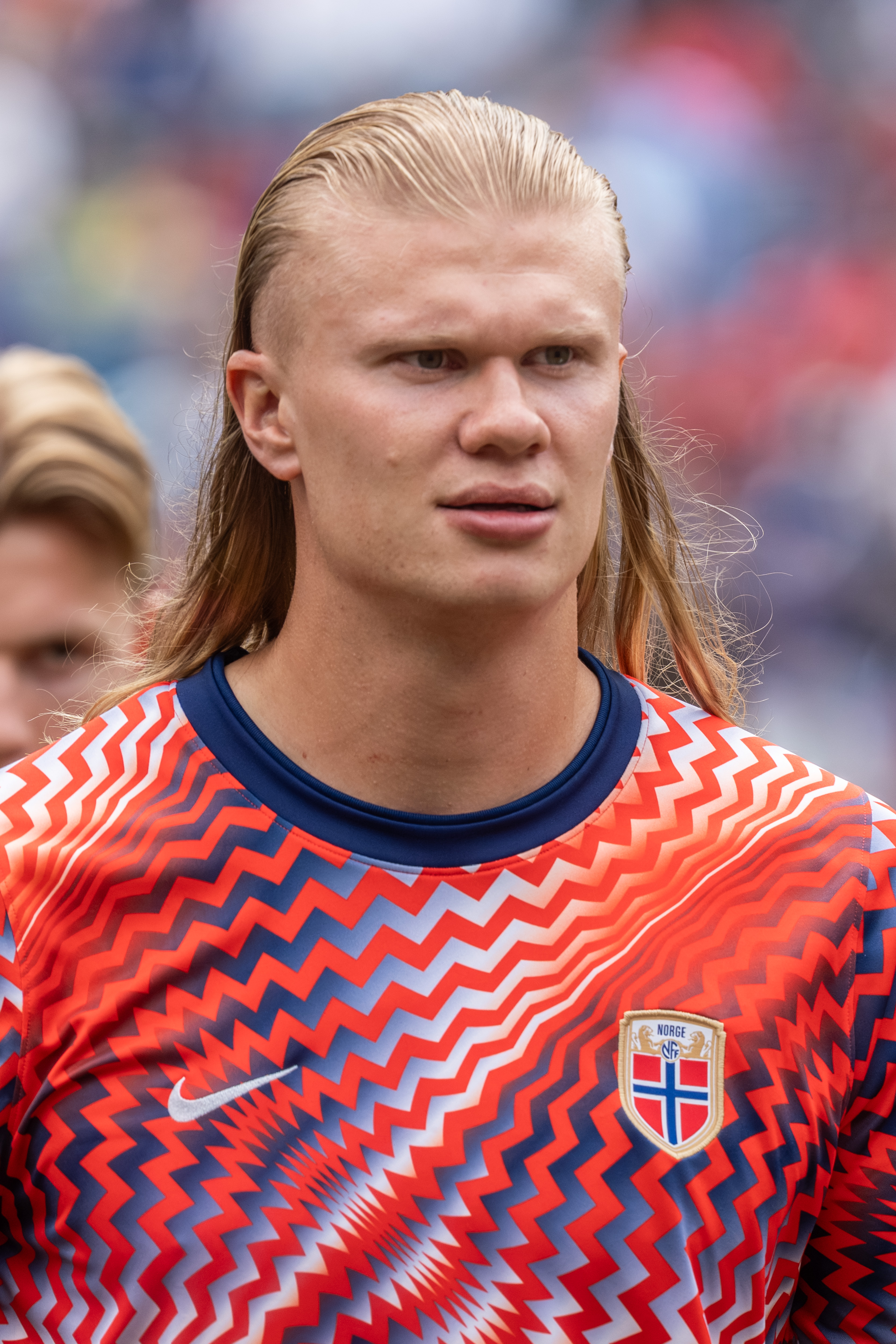
Haaland (pictured in 2026) has scored 68 international goals since making his debut for Norway in 2019.

Erling Haaland is a Norwegian professional footballer who has represented the Norway national team as a forward since his debut in 2019. Since then, Haaland has scored 68 goals in 61 international appearances, making him the country's all-time top scorer. On 10 October 2024, Haaland scored a brace in Norway's 3–0 2024–25 UEFA Nations League B win over Slovenia, reaching 34 international goals and overtaking Jørgen Juve's record that had stood since 1937 to become the all-time top scorer for Norway, at the age of 24.

Haaland made his debut for Norway on 5 September 2019, against Malta, starting in the 2–0 home win in UEFA Euro 2020 qualifying. Almost a year later, Haaland scored his first senior international goal for Norway on 4 September 2020, in a 2–1 loss against Austria in the 2020–21 Nations League B. He would finish the 2020–21 Nations League as the competition's top scorer with six goals, a feat that he replicated in the 2022–23 edition between June and September 2022, finishing as the joint-top scorer of the competition.

On 11 October 2020, Haaland scored his first international hat-trick in Norway's 4–0 victory over Romania in a Nations League B match, bringing his tally for the senior team to six goals in six matches played. He has scored six international hat-tricks, with the other hat-tricks coming in a 5–1 win against Gibraltar in a 2022 FIFA World Cup qualifier in September 2021, a 3–0 friendly victory over Kosovo in June 2024, a 5–0 Nations League win against Kazakhstan in November 2024, an 11–1 win over Moldova (five goals), and a 5–0 win against Israel in a 2026 FIFA World Cup qualifier in October 2025.

Out of all his opponents, Haaland has scored the most against Moldova, netting six goals against the side. He has scored seven goals in the FIFA World Cup, a record 25 goals in the UEFA Nations League, 21 goals in World Cup qualifiers, and six goals in UEFA European Championship qualifiers. His other goals have come in friendly matches. His most productive calendar year in terms of international goals was 2025, when he scored seventeen goals in nine games.

== Goals ==
As of match played 17 November 2026
Norway score listed first, score column indicates score after each Haaland goal

Table key
‡	Indicates goal was scored from a penalty kick
	Indicates Norway won the match
	Indicates the match ended in a draw
	Indicates Norway lost the match

International goals by date, venue, cap, opponent, score, result and competition
No.	Date	Venue	Cap	Opponent	Score	Result	Competition	Ref.
1	4 September 2020	Ullevaal Stadion, Oslo, Norway	3	Austria	1–2	1–2	2020–21 UEFA Nations League B	
2	7 September 2020	Windsor Park, Belfast, Northern Ireland	4	Northern Ireland	2–1	5–1	2020–21 UEFA Nations League B	
3	7 September 2020	Windsor Park, Belfast, Northern Ireland	4	Northern Ireland	5–1	5–1	2020–21 UEFA Nations League B	
4	11 October 2020	Ullevaal Stadion, Oslo, Norway	6	Romania	1–0	4–0	2020–21 UEFA Nations League B	
5	11 October 2020	Ullevaal Stadion, Oslo, Norway	6	Romania	3–0	4–0	2020–21 UEFA Nations League B	
6	11 October 2020	Ullevaal Stadion, Oslo, Norway	6	Romania	4–0	4–0	2020–21 UEFA Nations League B	
7	2 June 2021	La Rosaleda Stadium, Málaga, Spain	11	Luxembourg	1–0	1–0	Friendly	
8	1 September 2021	Ullevaal Stadion, Oslo, Norway	13	Netherlands	1–0	1–1	2022 FIFA World Cup qualification	
9	4 September 2021	Daugava Stadium, Riga, Latvia	14	Latvia	1–0‡	2–0	2022 FIFA World Cup qualification	
10	7 September 2021	Ullevaal Stadion, Oslo, Norway	15	Gibraltar	2–0	5–1	2022 FIFA World Cup qualification	
11	7 September 2021	Ullevaal Stadion, Oslo, Norway	15	Gibraltar	3–0	5–1	2022 FIFA World Cup qualification	
12	7 September 2021	Ullevaal Stadion, Oslo, Norway	15	Gibraltar	5–1	5–1	2022 FIFA World Cup qualification	
13	25 March 2022	Ullevaal Stadion, Oslo, Norway	16	Slovakia	1–0	2–0	Friendly	
14	29 March 2022	Ullevaal Stadion, Oslo, Norway	17	Armenia	1–0	9–0	Friendly	
15	29 March 2022	Ullevaal Stadion, Oslo, Norway	17	Armenia	5–0	9–0	Friendly	
16	2 June 2022	Red Star Stadium, Belgrade, Serbia	18	Serbia	1–0	1–0	2022–23 UEFA Nations League B	
17	5 June 2022	Friends Arena, Solna, Sweden	19	Sweden	1–0‡	2–1	2022–23 UEFA Nations League B	
18	5 June 2022	Friends Arena, Solna, Sweden	19	Sweden	2–0	2–1	2022–23 UEFA Nations League B	
19	12 June 2022	Ullevaal Stadion, Oslo, Norway	21	Sweden	1–0	3–2	2022–23 UEFA Nations League B	
20	12 June 2022	Ullevaal Stadion, Oslo, Norway	21	Sweden	2–0‡	3–2	2022–23 UEFA Nations League B	
21	24 September 2022	Stožice Stadium, Ljubljana, Slovenia	22	Slovenia	1–0	1–2	2022–23 UEFA Nations League B	
22	17 June 2023	Ullevaal Stadion, Oslo, Norway	24	Scotland	1–0‡	1–2	UEFA Euro 2024 qualifying	
23	20 June 2023	Ullevaal Stadion, Oslo, Norway	25	Cyprus	2–0‡	3–1	UEFA Euro 2024 qualifying	
24	20 June 2023	Ullevaal Stadion, Oslo, Norway	25	Cyprus	3–0	3–1	UEFA Euro 2024 qualifying	
25	12 September 2023	Ullevaal Stadion, Oslo, Norway	26	Georgia	1–0	2–1	UEFA Euro 2024 qualifying	
26	12 October 2023	AEK Arena, Larnaca, Cyprus	27	Cyprus	2–0	4–0	UEFA Euro 2024 qualifying	
27	12 October 2023	AEK Arena, Larnaca, Cyprus	27	Cyprus	3–0	4–0	UEFA Euro 2024 qualifying	
28	5 June 2024	Ullevaal Stadion, Oslo, Norway	32	Kosovo	1–0	3–0	Friendly	
29	5 June 2024	Ullevaal Stadion, Oslo, Norway	32	Kosovo	2–0	3–0	Friendly	
30	5 June 2024	Ullevaal Stadion, Oslo, Norway	32	Kosovo	3–0	3–0	Friendly	
31	8 June 2024	Brøndby Stadium, Brøndbyvester, Denmark	33	Denmark	1–2	1–3	Friendly	
32	9 September 2024	Ullevaal Stadion, Oslo, Norway	35	Austria	2–1	2–1	2024–25 UEFA Nations League B	
33	10 October 2024	Ullevaal Stadion, Oslo, Norway	36	Slovenia	1–0	3–0	2024–25 UEFA Nations League B	
34	10 October 2024	Ullevaal Stadion, Oslo, Norway	36	Slovenia	3–0	3–0	2024–25 UEFA Nations League B	
35	14 November 2024	Stožice Stadium, Ljubljana, Slovenia	38	Slovenia	2–1	4–1	2024–25 UEFA Nations League B	
36	17 November 2024	Ullevaal Stadion, Oslo, Norway	39	Kazakhstan	1–0	5–0	2024–25 UEFA Nations League B	
37	17 November 2024	Ullevaal Stadion, Oslo, Norway	39	Kazakhstan	2–0	5–0	2024–25 UEFA Nations League B	
38	17 November 2024	Ullevaal Stadion, Oslo, Norway	39	Kazakhstan	4–0	5–0	2024–25 UEFA Nations League B	
39	22 March 2025	Zimbru Stadium, Chișinău, Moldova	40	Moldova	2–0	5–0	2026 FIFA World Cup qualification	
40	25 March 2025	Nagyerdei Stadion, Debrecen, Hungary	41	Israel	4–1	4–2	2026 FIFA World Cup qualification	
41	6 June 2025	Ullevaal Stadion, Oslo, Norway	42	Italy	3–0	3–0	2026 FIFA World Cup qualification	
42	9 June 2025	Lilleküla Stadium, Tallinn, Estonia	43	Estonia	1–0	1–0	2026 FIFA World Cup qualification	
43	4 September 2025	Ullevaal Stadion, Oslo, Norway	44	Finland	1–0‡	1–0	Friendly	
44	9 September 2025	Ullevaal Stadion, Oslo, Norway	45	Moldova	2–0	11–1	2026 FIFA World Cup qualification	
45	9 September 2025	Ullevaal Stadion, Oslo, Norway	45	Moldova	3–0	11–1	2026 FIFA World Cup qualification	
46	9 September 2025	Ullevaal Stadion, Oslo, Norway	45	Moldova	4–0	11–1	2026 FIFA World Cup qualification	
47	9 September 2025	Ullevaal Stadion, Oslo, Norway	45	Moldova	6–0	11–1	2026 FIFA World Cup qualification	
48	9 September 2025	Ullevaal Stadion, Oslo, Norway	45	Moldova	10–1	11–1	2026 FIFA World Cup qualification	
49	11 October 2025	Ullevaal Stadion, Oslo, Norway	46	Israel	2–0	5–0	2026 FIFA World Cup qualification	
50	11 October 2025	Ullevaal Stadion, Oslo, Norway	46	Israel	4–0	5–0	2026 FIFA World Cup qualification	
51	11 October 2025	Ullevaal Stadion, Oslo, Norway	46	Israel	5–0	5–0	2026 FIFA World Cup qualification	
52	13 November 2025	Ullevaal Stadion, Oslo, Norway	47	Estonia	3–0	4–1	2026 FIFA World Cup qualification	
53	13 November 2025	Ullevaal Stadion, Oslo, Norway	47	Estonia	4–0	4–1	2026 FIFA World Cup qualification	
54	16 November 2025	San Siro, Milan, Italy	48	Italy	2–1	4–1	2026 FIFA World Cup qualification	
55	16 November 2025	San Siro, Milan, Italy	48	Italy	3–1	4–1	2026 FIFA World Cup qualification	
56	16 June 2026	Gillette Stadium, Foxborough, United States	51	Iraq	1–0	4–1	2026 FIFA World Cup	
57	16 June 2026	Gillette Stadium, Foxborough, United States	51	Iraq	2–1	4–1	2026 FIFA World Cup	
58	22 June 2026	MetLife Stadium, East Rutherford, United States	52	Senegal	2–0	3–2	2026 FIFA World Cup	
59	22 June 2026	MetLife Stadium, East Rutherford, United States	52	Senegal	3–1	3–2	2026 FIFA World Cup	
60	30 June 2026	AT&T Stadium, Arlington, United States	53	Ivory Coast	2–1	2–1	2026 FIFA World Cup	
61	5 July 2026	MetLife Stadium, East Rutherford, United States	54	Brazil	1–0	2–1	2026 FIFA World Cup	
62	5 July 2026	MetLife Stadium, East Rutherford, United States	54	Brazil	2–0	2–1	2026 FIFA World Cup	
63	24 September 2026	Ullevaal Stadion, Oslo, Norway	56	Denmark	2–0	3–2	2026–27 UEFA Nations League A	
64	24 September 2026	Ullevaal Stadion, Oslo, Norway	56	Denmark	3–2	3–2	2026–27 UEFA Nations League A	
65	27 September 2026	Ullevaal Stadion, Oslo, Norway	57	Portugal	1–1	1–2	2026–27 UEFA Nations League A	
66	14 November 2026	Ullevaal Stadion, Oslo, Norway	60	Wales	3–1‡	3–1	2026–27 UEFA Nations League A	
67	17 November 2026	Parken Stadium, Copenhagen, Denmark	61	Denmark	1–2	3–2	2026–27 UEFA Nations League A	
68	17 November 2026	Parken Stadium, Copenhagen, Denmark	61	Denmark	3–2‡	3–2	2026–27 UEFA Nations League A	

== Hat-tricks ==
As of match played 11 October 2025

List of international hat-tricks scored by Erling Haaland
No.	Date	Venue	Opponent	Goals	Result	Competition	Ref.
1	11 October 2020	Ullevaal Stadion, Oslo, Norway	Romania	3 (13', 64', 74')	4–0	2020–21 UEFA Nations League B	
2	7 September 2021	Ullevaal Stadion, Oslo, Norway	Gibraltar	3 (27', 39', 90+1')	5–1	2022 FIFA World Cup qualification	
3	5 June 2024	Ullevaal Stadion, Oslo, Norway	Kosovo	3 (15', 70', 75')	3–0	Friendly	
4	17 November 2024	Ullevaal Stadion, Oslo, Norway	Kazakhstan	3 (23', 37', 71')	5–0	2024–25 UEFA Nations League B	
5	9 September 2025	Ullevaal Stadion, Oslo, Norway	Moldova	5 (11', 36', 43', 52', 83')	11–1	2026 FIFA World Cup qualification	
6	11 October 2025	Ullevaal Stadion, Oslo, Norway	Israel	3 (27', 63', 72')	5–0	2026 FIFA World Cup qualification	

== Statistics ==
As of match played 17 November 2026

Appearances and goals by year
Year	Apps	Goals
2019	2	0
2020	5	6
2021	8	6
2022	8	9
2023	6	6
2024	10	11
2025	9	17
2026	13	13
Total	61	68

Appearances and goals by competition
Competition	Apps	Goals
FIFA World Cup qualification	14	21
FIFA World Cup	5	7
UEFA European Championship qualifying	8	6
UEFA Nations League	22	25
Friendlies	12	9
Total	61	68

Goals by opponent
Opponent	Goals
Moldova	6
Denmark	5
Cyprus	4
Israel	4
Slovenia	4
Sweden	4
Estonia	3
Gibraltar	3
Italy	3
Kazakhstan	3
Kosovo	3
Romania	3
Armenia	2
Austria	2
Brazil	2
Iraq	2
Northern Ireland	2
Senegal	2
Finland	1
Georgia	1
Ivory Coast	1
Latvia	1
Luxembourg	1
Netherlands	1
Portugal	1
Scotland	1
Serbia	1
Slovakia	1
Wales	1
Total	68

== See also ==
- List of top international men's football goalscorers by country
- List of men's footballers with 50 or more international goals
