= Viking Row =

Norwegian football chant

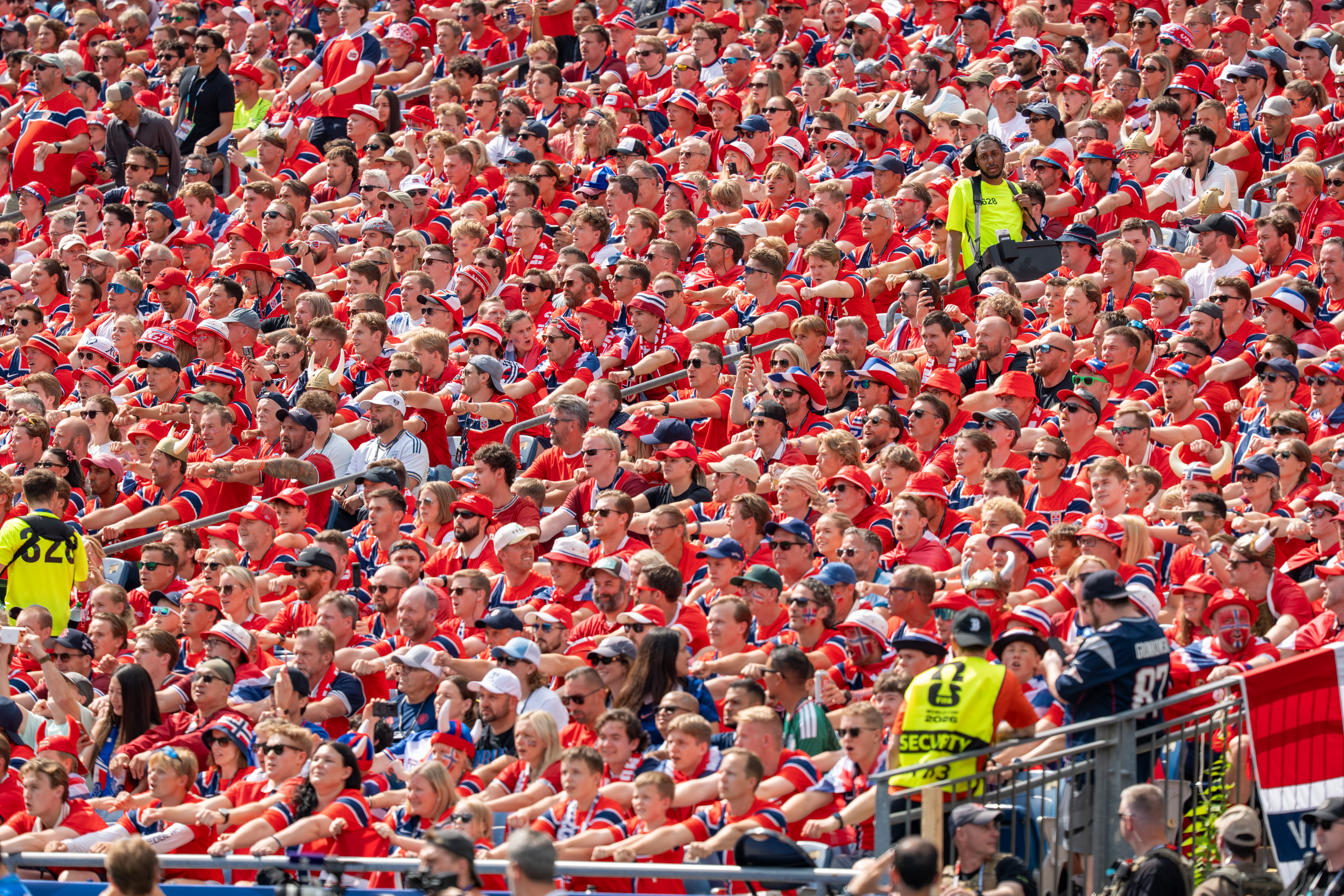
Norwegian supporters performing the Viking Row during their 2026 FIFA World Cup match against France in Group I

The Viking Row (Norwegian: Viking-roing) is a football chant, consisting of an exaggerated rowing movement in unison combined with the shouting of the Norwegian word for "row" ("ro") that is repeated after a drumbeat. The chant is typically initiated by the sounding of a traditional Norse blowing horn known as the gjallarhorn, which signals supporters to get into position before a drumbeat sets the pace of the rowing.

The chant is designed to evoke the rowing of oars on board a Viking longship, and has been compared to the Icelandic Viking Thunder Clap.

The ritual became prominent during the 2026 FIFA World Cup, as Norwegian supporters performed the chant in a variety of settings. Over the course of the tournament, the practice transitioned from a specialized matchday routine into a widespread cultural phenomenon, characterized by rapid cross-demographic adoption and institutional participation first permeating Norwegian public life before experiencing global diffusion as a widespread participatory internet meme.

== Origin ==
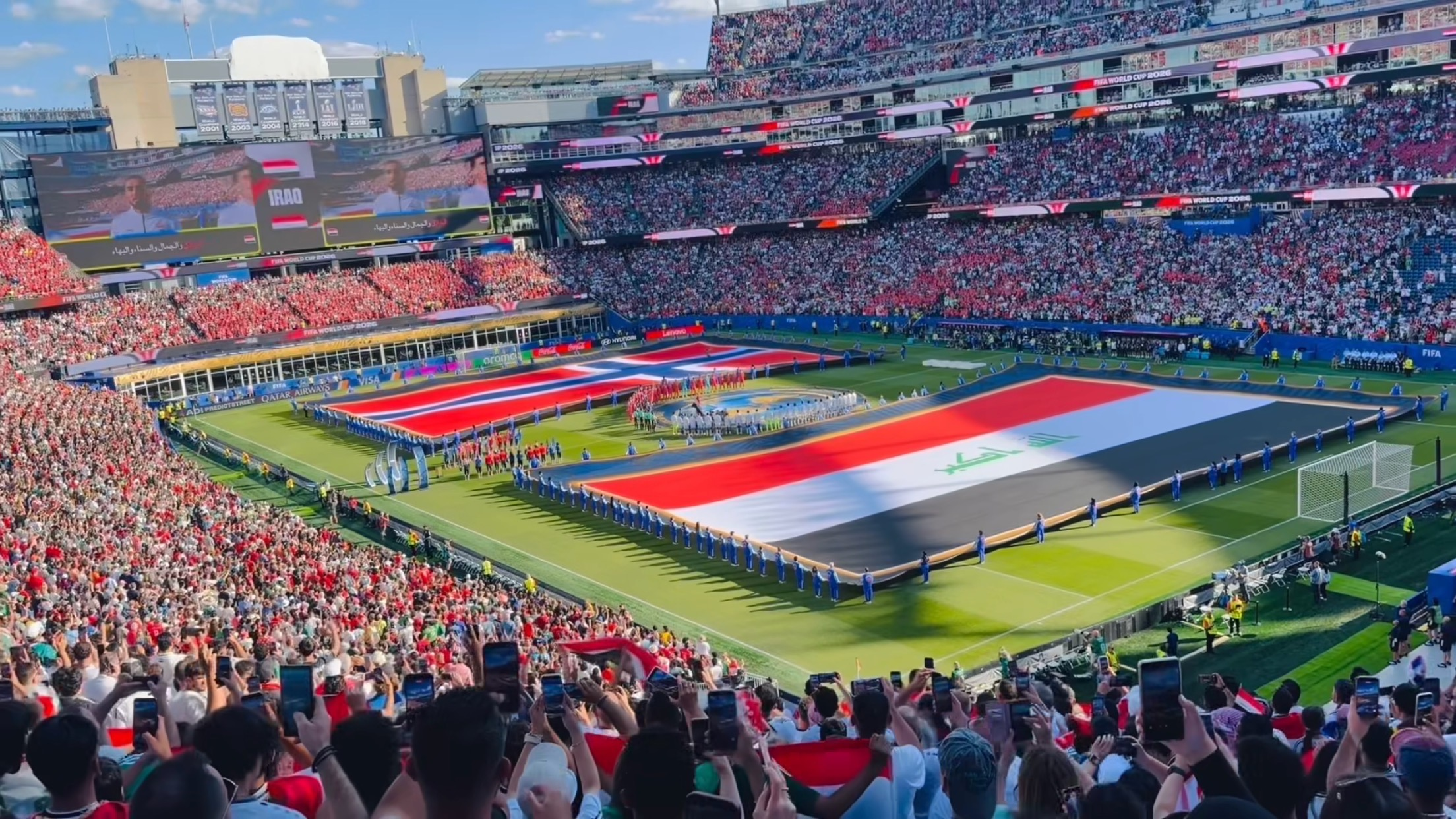
Norwegian supporters during the 2026 Iraq versus Norway Group I match

The row chant was conceptualised by Ole Frøystad, known online as Mr. Row Row, who pitched the idea to the Norwegian supporter club Oljeberget in late 2025. Fans first used it during a March 2026 friendly match against Switzerland. It gained popularity after it was used in a friendly match against Sweden on June 1, 2026, and during the 2026 FIFA World Cup.

Before being adopted by Norwegian football supporters in 2026, coordinated "Viking rowing" had been a well-known audience ritual in the heavy metal scene for many years, particularly at concerts by the Swedish Viking metal band Amon Amarth. The ritual, often performed during the song "Put Your Back Into the Oar", involves audiences sitting on the ground and mimicking the rowing of a Viking longship in unison.

== Notable occurrences ==
One of the more notable gatherings was when Norwegian fans took over Times Square in New York City while performing the chant, doing so next to an annual "summer solstice" yoga event held there.

In June 2026, over 15,000 people gathered in the main street of the city of Oslo, Karl Johan, outside the Royal Palace to perform the chant led by Petter Northug.

On 24 June, Norwegian fans performed the chant during a New York Mets game at Citi Field alongside the team's mascots Mr. Met and Mrs. Met.

Martin Ødegaard led a celebratory chant after defeating Senegal and Ivory Coast, where the Norwegian national football team joined the supporters in performing the chant on pitch. After defeating Brazil the chant was led by Erling Haaland.

The chant has been performed by several Norwegian institutions, such as the Storting collectively rowing with the entire Norwegian parliament and Sagastad filling the entire deck of the Myklebust Ship with supporters. The Norwegian Royal Family posted a video on social media of Crown Prince Haakon and Prince Sverre Magnus rowing the Myklebust Ship and the crowds rowing outside the Royal Palace in response to the trend.

The Norwegian Armed Forces published a video of a Royal Norwegian Air Force pilot performing the Viking Row from the cockpit of an F-35 fighter aircraft. Eventually, the trend spread to large parts of Norwegian society, with kindergartens, schools, hospitals and retirement homes around Norway joining in.

During the Norway–Ivory Coast match on 1 July 2026, the synchronized movement and simultaneous cheering during the collective Norwegian rowing celebrations in Oslo and Bergen registered as earthquakes.

On 5 July 2026, following Norway's victory over Brazil, Crown Prince Haakon joined supporters performing the Viking Row outside the Royal Palace.

Following Norway's return from the 2026 FIFA World Cup, Crown Prince Haakon led the Viking Row together with the national team and Ole Frøystad outside the Royal Palace during the team's official reception after meeting King Harald V. They were joined by Princess Ingrid Alexandra, Prince Sverre Magnus and approximately 100,000 supporters.

The Viking Row was featured during the 2026 FIFA World Cup final halftime show as a segment featuring Erling Haaland drumming and the Simon Bolivar Symphonic Orchestra and Muppets performing the chant in response. The chant was also adopted by Spain's fans following the country's victory in the 2026 FIFA World Cup.

== Reception ==
Reception to the Viking Row has been mostly positive, with some concerned about the celebration of Vikings in regard to historical controversy.

=== In Norway ===
Reception in Norway has been positive, with the Norwegian parliament and the royal family performing the chant.

Innovation Norway's Director of Travel, Aase Marthe Horrigmo, praised the chant for bringing more attention to the country. Figures in Norwegian academia such as Professor Peggy Simcic Brønn at BI and Trond Blindheim at Kristiania University College highlight the tourism value and increased focus on Viking Age history.

Norwegian tourism attractions reported increased interest. Ellen Marie Næss at the Viking Ship Museum said that the Viking Age story is interesting in itself, but the chant has created a boost. Jacob Bredesen at Sagastad said the chant was some of the best marketing Norway ever had. Mette Brinchmann at Viking Farm also confirmed increased interest.

=== Other Nordic countries ===
Reception in Sweden and Denmark has been mixed.

Swedish players such as Gustaf Lagerbielke and Elliot Stroud felt the Viking row was a copy of the Viking Thunder Clap and overused. Danish journalist Johnny Wojciech Kokborg described it as "bordering on Nordic adult bullying".

=== Anglo-American media ===
The New York Times has praised the chant for capturing the American public's imagination. British writer Gavin Mortimer wrote in The Spectator that "You would have to be a crotchety killjoy to complain about the Viking Row. It’s just a bit of humorous high jinks. Humorous but also a little hypocritical", accusing The New York Times of hypocrisy for praising the Viking Row but criticising the actions of Christopher Columbus.
