= Jens Steffensen =

Danish footballer (born 1950)

Personal information
- Full name: Jens Steffensen
- Date of birth: 4 August 1950 (age 76)
- Place of birth: Denmark
- Position: Defender

Senior career*
Years	Team	Apps	(Gls)
-1971	Aalborg Chang		
1971–1977	Aalborg BK		
1977–1980	Bayer Uerdingen	104	(0)
1980–1982	Arminia Bielefeld	19	(0)
1982-1983	Aalborg BK		
1983-1986	Ikast FS	81	(0)
1986-1987	Hjørring IF	14	(0)
1987-1989	Aalborg BK	25	(0)
1989	Herfølge Boldklub	3	(0)

International career
1976–1980	Denmark	9	(1)
- * Club domestic league appearances and goals

Jens Steffensen (born 4 August 1950) is a Danish former football player.

During his club career, Steffensen played for Aalborg BK, Bayer Uerdingen, Arminia Bielefeld, Ikast FS, Hjørring IF and Herfølge Boldklub.

Steffensen made 9 appearances for the Denmark national football team from 1976 to 1980, scoring 1 goal.

== Career statistics ==
=== International ===
Appearances and goals by national team and year
National team	Year	Apps	Goals
Denmark	1976	1	0
Denmark	1977	–	
Denmark	1978	–	
Denmark	1979	1	0
Denmark	1980	7	1
Total		9	1

Scores and results list Denmark's goal tally first, score column indicates score after each Steffensen goal.

List of international goals scored by Jens Steffenson
No.	Date	Venue	Opponent	Score	Result	Competition
1	7 May 1980	Ullevi, Gothenburg, Sweden	Sweden	1–0	1–0	1978–80 Nordic Football Championship
