= Aki Heiskanen =

Finnish footballer (born 1952)

Personal information
- Date of birth: 2 February 1952 (age 74)
- Place of birth: Kuopio, Finland
- Position: Midfielder

Senior career*
Years	Team	Apps	(Gls)
1969–1973	KuPS Kuopio	91	(15)
1973–1979	KPT Kuopio	120	(35)
1979–1980	KuPS Kuopio		
1980–1983	Elo Kuopio		

International career^{‡}
1974–1978	Finland	31	(7)
- * Club domestic league appearances and goals as of 13 September 2017 (UTC) ‡ National team caps and goals as of 13 September 2017 (UTC)

Aki Heiskanen (born 2 February 1952) is a retired Finnish footballer. During his club career, Heiskanen played for KuPS Kuopio, KPT Kuopio and Elo Kuopio. He made 31 appearances for the Finland national team, scoring 7 goals.

== Honours ==
- Finnish Cup: 1968
