= Tor Egil Johansen =

Norwegian footballer (born 1950)

Personal information
- Full name: Tor Egil Johansen
- Date of birth: 8 August 1950 (age 76)
- Place of birth: Oslo, Norway
- Position: Midfielder

International career
Years	Team	Apps	(Gls)
1971–1980	Norway	52	(7)

Tor Egil "Toro" Johansen (born 8 August 1950) is a retired Norwegian footballer.

He was born in Oslo. A midfielder with 52 caps and 7 goals for his country, he was even the national team captain in 14 matches during the 1970s.

Johansen played 327 matches for Skeid, of which 166 came in the Norwegian Premier League. He won the cup title in 1974 before getting signed by Lillestrøm SK in 1976. Spending two seasons with LSK, he would lift the two league titles as well as the 1977 cup title. The next year he returned to Skeid, finishing his career there.
