= Yevgeni Chupin =

Russian footballer

Personal information
- Full name: Yevgeni Valeryevich Chupin
- Date of birth: 24 October 1980 (age 46)
- Height: 1.78 m (5 ft 10 in)
- Positions: Defender; midfielder

Senior career*
Years	Team	Apps	(Gls)
1998–1999	FC Torpedo Volzhsky	58	(4)
2000–2003	FC Svetotekhnika Saransk	95	(1)
2004	FC Lukoil Chelyabinsk	25	(1)
2005	FC Neftyanik Ufa	32	(0)
2006	FC Energetik Uren	23	(0)
2007	FC Volga Ulyanovsk	16	(0)
2008	FC Gornyak Uchaly	32	(0)
2009	FC FSA Voronezh	16	(0)
2009	FC Sokol-Saratov	13	(0)
2010	FC Sheksna Cherepovets	31	(0)
2011	FC Zenit-Izhevsk	10	(0)
2011–2012	FC Sheksna Cherepovets	19	(0)
- * Club domestic league appearances and goals

Yevgeni Valeryevich Chupin (Russian: Евгений Валерьевич Чупин; born 24 October 1980) is a former Russian professional football player.

== Club career ==
He made his Russian Football National League debut for FC Lisma-Mordovia Saransk on 29 March 2003 in a game against FC Khimki.

== Personal life ==
He is a son of a former player and coach Valeri Chupin. His son, also named Valeri Chupin, is a footballer as well.
