= Jouko Suomalainen =

Finnish footballer (born 1949)

Personal information
- Date of birth: 8 April 1949 (age 77)
- Place of birth: Kuopio, Finland
- Position: Midfielder

Senior career*
Years	Team	Apps	(Gls)
1967–1970	KuPS	70	(11)
1971–1980	Koparit		(31)
1982–1983	Elo	35	(2)
1984	Koparit	3	(0)

International career
1970–1978	Finland	48	(1)
- * Club domestic league appearances and goals

Jouko Suomalainen (born 8 April 1949) is a Finnish former footballer who played as a midfielder. He made 48 appearances for the Finland national team from 1970 to 1978. At club level he played for Kuopion Palloseura, Kuopion Pallotoverit and Kuopion Elo.
