= Juhani Himanka =

Finnish footballer (born 1956)

Personal information
- Full name: Olavi Juhani Himanka
- Date of birth: 19 April 1956 (age 70)
- Place of birth: Tervola, Finland
- Height: 1.79 m (5 ft 10 in)
- Position: Forward

Senior career*
Years	Team	Apps	(Gls)
1974–1977	Into Kemi		
1977–1978	GIF Sundsvall	21	(8)
1978–1979	OTP Oulu	19	(7)
1979–1982	OPS Oulu	73	(48)
1982–1983	Lillestrøm SK	20	(9)
1983–1990	KePS Kemi	126	(44)
1990–1992	Visa Kemi		
1992–1999	KePS Kemi	75	(20)

International career^{‡}
1979–1982	Finland	16	(4)
- * Club domestic league appearances and goals as of 14 September 2017 (UTC) ‡ National team caps and goals as of 14 September 2017 (UTC)

Juhani Himanka (born 19 April 1956) is a retired Finnish footballer and Olympian. During his club career, Himanka played for Into Kemi, GIF Sundsvall, OTP Oulu, OPS Oulu, Lillestrøm SK, KePS Kemi and Visa Kemi. He made 16 appearances for the Finland national team, scoring 4 goals. He also competed in the men's tournament at the 1980 Summer Olympics.
