= Kurt Hansen (footballer, born 1951) =

Danish footballer

Kurt Hansen (born 2 August 1951) is a former Denmark international footballer. He played seven times for Denmark between 1976 and 1978, scoring one goal. Hansen also played for the B 1901 and Nakskov BK clubs.
