= Elo Kuopio =

Football club from Kuopio, Finland

Kuopion Elo
- Full name: Kuopion Elo
- Founded: 1919
- Ground: Väre Areena
- Capacity: 4,778
- Chairman: (Finland) Jani Pursiainen
- Manager: (Finland) Pekka Niskanen
- League: Kakkonen
Home colours	Away colours

Kuopion Elo (originally Männistön Elo) is a football club from Kuopio, Finland. In 2023, they compete in Kakkonen, the third tier of Finnish football. Elo is the oldest existing football club from Kuopio.

== History ==
Kuopion Elo was founded as Männistön Elo by local working class youth in 1919. In the past, the club have also played other sports. From early on their home area have been Männistö and Itkonniemi districts north of Kuopio city center. At the beginning they played only against Kuopion Riento. They played their first match in 1919. In 1929 club possessions where ceased by court as a leftist organization and some members founded a new club called Männistön Urheilijat, some joined Kuopion Kisa-Veikot. In 1946, Männistön Urheilijat continued as Männistön Elo. They have played three seasons in Finnish top tier Mestaruussarja. In late 1980s club had financial difficulties and they eventually merged with other financially troubled club Koparit to form FC Kuopio. Elo continued football in 2012 season from sixth tier Vitonen.

== Notable players ==
- (England) Pat Corbett
- (England) Paul Sugrue
- (Finland) Olavi Rissanen
- (Finland) Jouko Suomalainen
- (Finland) Tero Taipale
- (Finland) Ilja Venäläinen
- (Soviet Union) Valeri Chupin

== Season to season ==
Season to season of Kuopion Elo

Season	Level	Division	Section	Administration	Position	Movements
1948	Tier 2	Suomensarja (Second Division)	North Group	Finnish FA (Suomen Palloliitto)	14th	Relegated
1949	Tier 3	Suomensarjan karsinnat	Cup format	Finnish FA & TUL(Suomen Pallolitto & Työväen Urheiluliitto)	2nd round	Qualifier for Suomensarja, qualified from TUL leagues
1950	Tier 3	Suomensarjan karsinnat	East Group	Finnish FA & TUL(Suomen Pallolitto & Työväen Urheiluliitto)	2nd	Qualification for Suomensarja, qualified from TUL leagues, Promoted
1951	Tier 2	Suomensarja (Second Division)	East Group	Finnish FA (Suomen Palloliitto)	9th	Relegated
1952	Tier 3	Suomensarjan karsinnat	East Group	Finnish FA & TUL(Suomen Pallolitto & Työväen Urheiluliitto)	8th	Qualification for Suomensarja, qualified from TUL leagues
1953	Tier 3	Suomensarjan karsinnat	East Group	Finnish FA & TUL(Suomen Pallolitto & Työväen Urheiluliitto)	3rd	Qualification for Suomensarja, qualified from TUL leagues
1954	Tier 3	Maakuntasarja (Third Division)	East Group I	Finnish FA (Suomen Palloliitto)	3rd	
1955	Tier 3	Maakuntasarja (Third Division)	East Group I	Finnish FA (Suomen Palloliitto)	1st	Promotion Playoff
1956	Tier 3	Maakuntasarja (Third Division)	East Group I	Finnish FA (Suomen Palloliitto)	2nd	
1957	Tier 3	Maakuntasarja (Third Division)	East Group II	Finnish FA (Suomen Palloliitto)	4th	
1958	Tier 3	Maakuntasarja (Third Division)	Group 7	Finnish FA (Suomen Palloliitto)	1st	Promoted
1959	Tier 2	Suomensarja (Second Division)	North Group	Finnish FA (Suomen Palloliitto)	8th	
1960	Tier 2	Suomensarja (Second Division)	East Group	Finnish FA (Suomen Palloliitto)	10th	Relegated
1961	Tier 3	Maakuntasarja (Third Division)	Group 7	Finnish FA (Suomen Palloliitto)	1st	Promoted
1962	Tier 2	Suomensarja (Second Division)	North Group	Finnish FA (Suomen Palloliitto)	10th	Relegated
1963	Tier 3	Maakuntasarja (Third Division)	Group 7	Finnish FA (Suomen Palloliitto)	2nd	
1964	Tier 3	Maakuntasarja (Third Division)	Group 7	Finnish FA (Suomen Palloliitto)	2nd	
1965	Tier 3	Maakuntasarja (Third Division)	Group 7	Finnish FA (Suomen Palloliitto)	1st	Promoted
1966	Tier 2	Suomensarja (Second Division)	North Group	Finnish FA (Suomen Palloliitto)	8th	
1967	Tier 2	Suomensarja (Second Division)	North Group	Finnish FA (Suomen Palloliitto)	2nd	
1968	Tier 2	Suomensarja (Second Division)	East Group	Finnish FA (Suomen Palloliitto)	1st	Promotion Group 1st – Promoted
1969	Tier 1	Mestaruussarja (Premier League)		Finnish FA (Suomen Palloliitto)	9th	
1970	Tier 1	Mestaruussarja (Premier League)		Finnish FA (Suomen Palloliitto)	12th	Relegated
1970	Tier 2	II Divisioona (Second Division)	North Group	Finnish FA (Suomen Palloliitto)	9th	
1971	Tier 2	II Divisioona (Second Division)	North Group	Finnish FA (Suomen Palloliitto)	3rd	
1972	Tier 2	II Divisioona (Second Division)	North Group	Finnish FA (Suomen Palloliitto)	6th	
1973	Tier 3	II Divisioona (Second Division)	North Group	Finnish FA (Suomen Palloliitto)	5th	
1974	Tier 3	II Divisioona (Second Division)	North Group	Finnish FA (Suomen Palloliitto)	6th	
1975	Tier 3	II Divisioona (Second Division)	North Group	Finnish FA (Suomen Palloliitto)	4th	
1976	Tier 3	II Divisioona (Second Division)	North Group	Finnish FA (Suomen Palloliitto)	9th	
1977	Tier 3	II Divisioona (Second Division)	North Group	Finnish FA (Suomen Palloliitto)	10th	Relegated
1978	Tier 4	III Divisioona (Third Division)	Group 7	Finnish FA (Suomen Palloliitto)	2nd	Promoted
1979	Tier 3	II Divisioona (Second Division)	North Group	Finnish FA (Suomen Palloliitto)	8th	
1980	Tier 3	II Divisioona (Second Division)	East Group	Finnish FA (Suomen Palloliitto)	1st	Promotion Playoff – Promoted
1981	Tier 2	I Divisioona (First Division)		Finnish FA (Suomen Palloliitto)	3rd	Promotion Group 2nd – Promoted
1982	Tier 1	Mestaruussarja (Premier League)		Finnish FA (Suomen Palloliitto)	12th	Relegation Group 7th – Relegated
1983	Tier 2	I Divisioona (First Division)		Finnish FA (Suomen Palloliitto)	8th	Relegation Group 4th
1984	Tier 2	I Divisioona (First Division)		Finnish FA (Suomen Palloliitto)	2nd	Promotion Playoff
1985	Tier 2	I Divisioona (First Division)		Finnish FA (Suomen Palloliitto)	9th	
1986	Tier 2	I Divisioona (First Division)		Finnish FA (Suomen Palloliitto)	4th	
1987	Tier 2	I Divisioona (First Division)		Finnish FA (Suomen Palloliitto)	4th	
1988	Tier 2	I Divisioona (First Division)		Finnish FA (Suomen Palloliitto)	8th	
1989	Tier 2	I Divisioona (First Division)		Finnish FA (Suomen Palloliitto)	7th	
1990	Tier 2	I Divisioona (First Division)		Finnish FA (Suomen Palloliitto)	5th	
1991	Tier 2	I Divisioona (First Division)		Finnish FA (Suomen Palloliitto)		Withdrew
1992–2011						No football team
2012	Tier 6	Vitonen (Fifth Division)	Group D	Eastern District (SPL Itä-Suomi)	3rd	Promotion Group 6th
2013	Tier 6	Vitonen (Fifth Division)	Group D	Eastern District (SPL Itä-Suomi)	4th	Promotion Group 4th
2014	Tier 6	Vitonen (Fifth Division)	Group C	Eastern District (SPL Itä-Suomi)	2nd	Promotion Group 6th
2015	Tier 6	Vitonen (Fifth Division)	Group B	Eastern District (SPL Itä-Suomi)	1st	Promotion Group 1st – Promoted
2016	Tier 5	Nelonen (Fourth Division)		Eastern District (SPL Itä-Suomi)	2nd	
2017	Tier 5	Nelonen (Fourth Division)		Eastern District (SPL Itä-Suomi)	3rd	
2018	Tier 5	Nelonen (Fourth Division)		Eastern District (SPL Itä-Suomi)	4th	
2019	Tier 5	Nelonen (Fourth Division)		Eastern District (SPL Itä-Suomi)	2nd	
2020	Tier 5	Nelonen (Fourth Division)		Eastern District (SPL Itä-Suomi)	5th	Promotion Group 5th
2021	Tier 5	Nelonen (Fourth Division)		Eastern District (SPL Itä-Suomi)	2nd	Promoted
2022	Tier 4	Kolmonen (Third Division)	Group 7	Eastern District (SPL Itä-Suomi)	1st	Promoted
2023	Tier 3	Kakkonen (Second Division)	Group C	Finnish FA (Suomen Palloliitto)	10th	
2024	Tier 4	Kakkonen (Second Division)	Group C	Finnish FA (Suomen Palloliitto)	6th	
2025	Tier 4	Kakkonen (Second Division)	Group C	Finnish FA (Suomen Palloliitto)		

- 3 seasons in Mestaruussarja
- 20 seasons in 2nd Tier
- 21 seasons in 3rd Tier
- 4 season in 4th Tier
- 6 seasons in 5th Tier
- 4 seasons in 6th Tier

== References and sources ==
- Official Kuopion Elo Website
- Finnish Wikipedia
