= Henk Weerink =

Dutch football referee

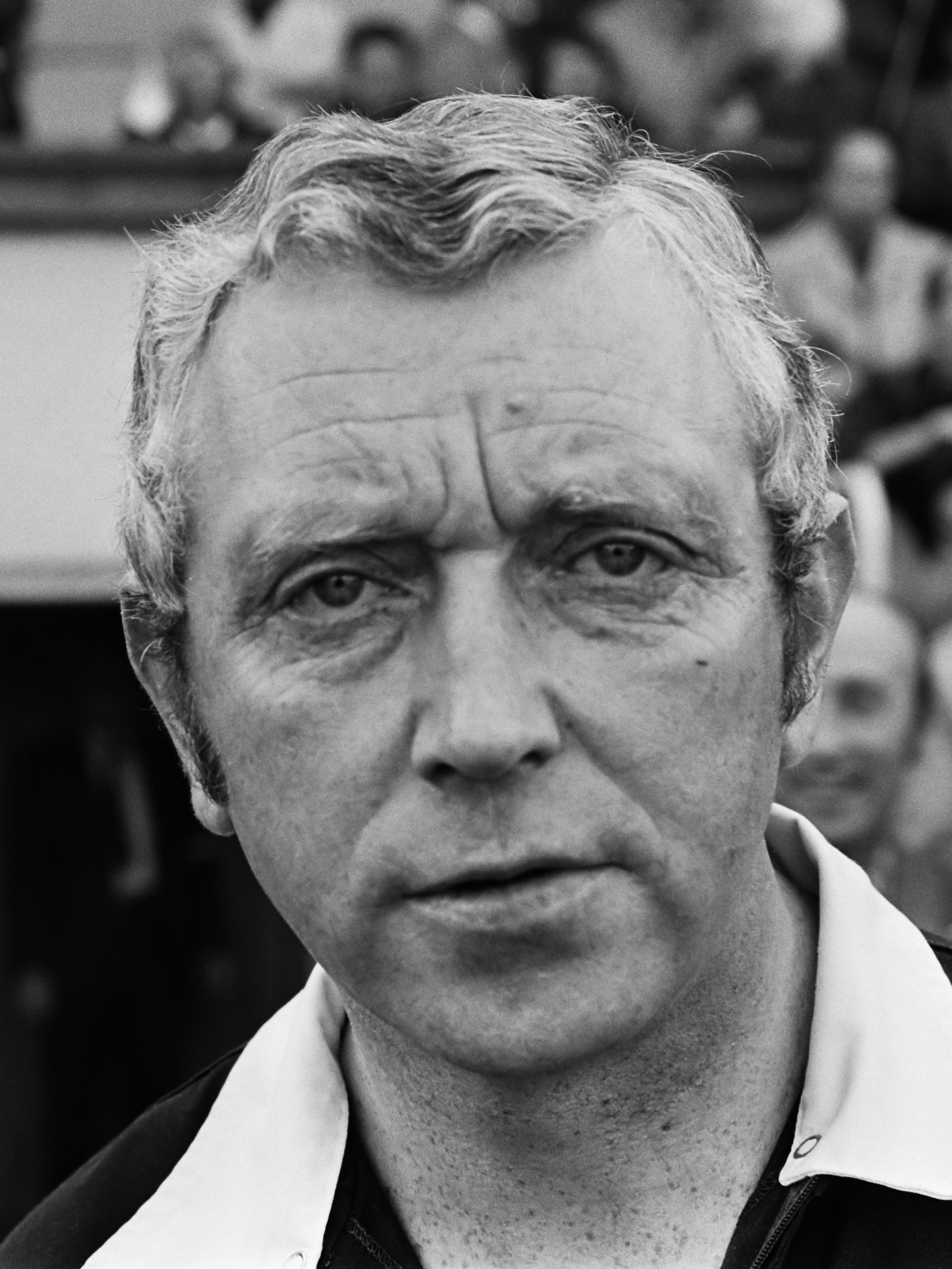
Henk Weerink in October 1976.

Hendrik "Henk" Weerink (2 July 1936 – 13 March 2014) was a Dutch association football referee. He refereed between 1967 and 1983 for more than 450 matches in national and international matches. He was born in Coevorden, Drenthe.

Weerink died on 13 March 2014 in his hometown of Coevorden.

== Other websites ==
- Henk Weerink at World Referee
