= Jean-Pierre Chupin =

French-Canadian architect, researcher and professor

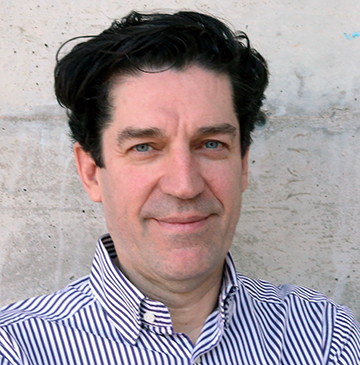
- Photograph of Jean-Pierre Chupin
- Born: September 3, 1960 (age 66); Nantes, France
- Education: Nantes School of Architecture; University of Portsmouth; McGill University; Université de Montréal
- Occupations: Architect, Researcher, Architectural Theorist, Professor
- Employer: Université de Montréal

Jean-Pierre Chupin (born September 3, 1960, in Nantes, France) is a French and Canadian architect, researcher, and architectural theorist who specializes in reasoning by analogy, qualitative practices, architectural competitions and awards of excellence. He is a professor at the School of Architecture, Faculty of Environmental Design, Université de Montréal. He holds the Canada Research Chair in Architecture, Competitions and Mediations of Excellence (CRC-ACME). He coordinates the Laboratory for the Study of Potential Architecture (L.E.A.P) since 2012.

== Short biography ==
Chupin graduated in 1985 from both the Nantes School of Architecture (France) and the University of Portsmouth (Great Britain) where he worked under the direction of Professor Geoffrey Broadbent, a pioneer in design thinking. After translating the French edition of Alberto Pérez-Gómez's seminal work, Architecture and the Crisis of Modern Science (1983), he emigrated to Canada in 1988 to study at McGill University. He obtained a master's degree in architectural history and theory from McGill University (1990) and a Ph.D. from the Université de Montréal (1998) under the direction of Alain Findeli, a specialist in Bauhaus pedagogy. In the 1990s, he taught at the design department of the Université du Québec à Montréal, then at the Écoles nationales supérieures d'architecture de Toulouse and Lyon in France. Since 2001, he has been a professor at the Université de Montréal. Chupin is a member of the Ordre des architectes du Québec (OAQ) and the Royal Architectural Institute of Canada (RAIC).

== Main contributions ==
Chupin co-founded the Laboratoire d'étude de l'architecture potentielle (L.E.A.P.) in 2002 with Georges Adamczyk and Denis Bilodeau. The L.E.A.P. lab is an inter-university and interdisciplinary team that today brings together 12 researchers from the 4 Montreal universities.

In 2003–2004, Chupin was Scholar-in-Residence at the Canadian Centre for Architecture where he produced a deep analysis of Città Analoga by Aldo Rossi. He subsequently compiled his epistemological research highlighting the role of analogical thinking in architectural theory and design thinking in Analogie et théorie en architecture (De la vie, de la ville et de la conception, même) published in 2010 and 2013 by Swiss publisher InFolio (Gollion).

Chupin is the founding director and editor of the Canadian Competitions Catalogue / Catalogue des concours canadiens (CCC), the bilingual documentary database of architectural, landscape and urban design projects designed in by competition in Canada. An open access online public interest resource, this project library contains information and documents on over 220 competitions and 6000 projects. The CCC received specific financial support from the Canada Foundation for Innovation (CFI) in 2012.

Jean-Pierre Chupin has contributed to the establishment of doctoral programs in architecture in France's graduate schools in the early 2000s and at the Université de Montréal since 2008. He was invited to give a lecture on doctoral programs by Professor Jean-Louis Cohen at the Collège de France in 2015 (Dans l'océan doctoral, un compas théorique).

In June 2022, Chupin received funding from the Social Sciences and Humanities Research Council of Canada to direct, from 2022 to 2027, a major research partnership on quality in the built environment. This participatory project brings together 14 universities, 70 researchers and 68 public and private organizations at the municipal, provincial and national levels. Coordinated by the Canada Research Chair in Architecture, Competitions and Mediations of Excellence (CRC-ACME), the partnership “Quality in Canada’s Built Environment: Roadmaps to Equity, Social Value and Sustainability” addresses the diversity of public environments impacting the everyday life of millions of Canadians in urban spaces, buildings and landscapes. This project develops case studies and “roadmaps to quality” benefiting from Chupin's new database on exemplarity and awards in Canada (AREA-BE).

== Honors and awards ==
- Honorary Member (2020) of the Association des architectes en pratique privée du Québec [AAPPQ] (October 29, 2020).
- Holder of the Canada Research Chair in Architecture, Competitions and Mediations of Excellence since February 2019.
- Université de Montréal Award of Excellence (Associate Professor) in Teaching (2008).
- Canadian representation at the 1995 Venice Architecture Biennale (with Léa Zeppelli, architect, and Pierre Boudon, philosopher): An Architectural Device Enabling the Perceptual Re-emergence of the Desire for Places, (Permanent collection of the Canadian Centre for Architecture).

== Selected publications ==
- Chupin, Jean-Pierre (translator), (1988), French translation of the book by Professor Alberto Perez-Gomez (Architecture and the Crisis of Modern Science) (The MIT Press, 1983) : L'Architecture et la crise de la science moderne, Bruxelles : Éditions Mardaga (Collection architecture + recherches n° 30), 350 pages. ISBN 978-2870093108
- Chupin, Jean-Pierre et Cyrille Simonnet (texts collected and presented by), (2005), Le Projet tectonique (avec une introduction de Kenneth Frampton), Gollion, InFolio, Collection des Grands ateliers, 222 pages. ISBN 978-2884745413
- Chupin, Jean-Pierre, (2010), Analogie et théorie en architecture (De la vie, de la ville et de la conception, même), Gollion, InFolio, Collection Projet et Théorie, 328 pages. (2013, second edition revised and augmented). ISBN 978-2-88474-575-8
- Chupin, Jean-Pierre, Carmela Cucuzzella, Bechara Helal, (edited by), (2015), Architecture Competitions and the Production of Culture, Quality and Knowledge (An International Inquiry), Montréal, Potential architecture books, 2015, 404 pages. ISBN 978-0-9921317-0-8
- Chupin, Jean-Pierre, (edited by), (2016), Concourir à l’excellence en architecture (éditoriaux du Catalogue des concours canadiens, 2006 – 2016), Montréal, Potential Architecture Books, 322 pages. ISBN 978-0-9921317-4-6 (OPEN ACCESS)
- Chupin, Jean-Pierre, (edited by), (2017), Competing for Excellence in Architecture (Editorials From the Canadian Competitions Catalogue, 2006 – 2016), Montreal, Potential Architecture Books, 314 pages. ISBN 978-0-9921317-5-3 (OPEN ACCESS)
- Chupin, Jean-Pierre, G. Stanley Collyer (2020), Young Architects in Competitions (When Competitions and a New Generation of Ideas Elevate Architectural Quality), Montreal, Potential Architecture Books, 158 pages. ISBN 978-1-9889620-4-7 (OPEN ACCESS)
- Carmela Cucuzzella, Jean-Pierre Chupin, Emmanuel Rondia, Sherif Goubran (2021), Réinventer l’attente du bus / Reimagining Waiting for the Bus (Principes de conception pour les espaces environnant les abribus / Design principles for spaces surrounding bus shelters), Montreal, Potential Architecture Books, 139 pages. ISBN 9781988962054 (OPEN ACCESS)
- Chupin, Jean-Pierre, Carmela Cucuzzella, Georges Adamczyk, (Edited by), (2022), The Rise of Awards in Architecture, Wilmington, Vernon Press, 300 pages. ISBN 978-1-64889-429-9
- Chupin, Jean-Pierre (Edited by), Catalogue des concours canadiens / Canadian Competitions Catalogue
- Chupin, Jean-Pierre (Edited by), Atlas of Research on Exemplarity in Architecture and the Built Environment / Atlas de recherche sur l’exemplarité en architecture et dans l’environnement bâti
