= Bjarne Pettersson =

Danish footballer (born 1952)

Personal information
- Full name: Bjarne Pettersson
- Date of birth: February 16, 1952 (age 74)
- Place of birth: Denmark
- Position: Forward

Senior career*
Years	Team	Apps	(Gls)
19XX–1979	Vanløse IF		
1979–1981	Herfølge BK		
1981–1983	B93		
1983–19XX	Vanløse IF		

International career
1974–1980	Denmark	7	(3)
- * Club domestic league appearances and goals

Bjarne Pettersson (born February 16, 1952) is a Danish former football player.

He most prominently played for Vanløse IF and Herfølge BK. He earned 7 caps for the Denmark national football team and scored 3 goals.

His brother Jan Pettersson was also a footballer, who played one game for the Danish national team.
