= Valeri Chupin =

Russian footballer and coach

Personal information
- Full name: Valeri Gennadyevich Chupin
- Date of birth: June 18, 1961 (age 65)
- Height: 1.71 m (5 ft 7 in)
- Position: Midfielder

Senior career*
| Years | Team | Apps | (Gls) |
| 1978–1981 | FC Dynamo Barnaul | 85 | (9) |
| 1982–1990 | FC Rotor Volgograd | 298 | (24) |
| 1990 | Elo Kuopio | 17 | (2) |
| 1991 | GBK Kokkola | | |
| 1992–1995 | FC Torpedo Volzhsky | 125 | (7) |
| 1996 | FC Volgodonsk | 35 | (1) |
| 1997–1998 | FC Torpedo Volzhsky | 64 | (6) |
| 1999 | FC Spartak-Telekom Shuya | 10 | (1) |
| 1999 | FC Torpedo Volzhsky | 13 | (1) |

Managerial career
- 2000: FC Torpedo Volzhsky (assistant)
- 2000: FC Torpedo Volzhsky
- * Club domestic league appearances and goals

Valeri Gennadyevich Chupin (Russian: Валерий Геннадьевич Чупин; born 18 June 1961) is a Russian former football player and coach.

== Career ==
Chupin began his career at FC Dynamo Barnaul, making his debut in the Soviet Second League. He later joined FC Rotor Volgograd, where he set the club record for appearances in the Soviet First League. After Rotor won promotion, he made 20 appearances in the Soviet Top League during the 1989 season.

== Personal life ==
His son Yevgeni Chupin was also a professional footballer, as is his grandson Valeri Chupin.
