= Eine Fredriksson =

Swedish association footballer

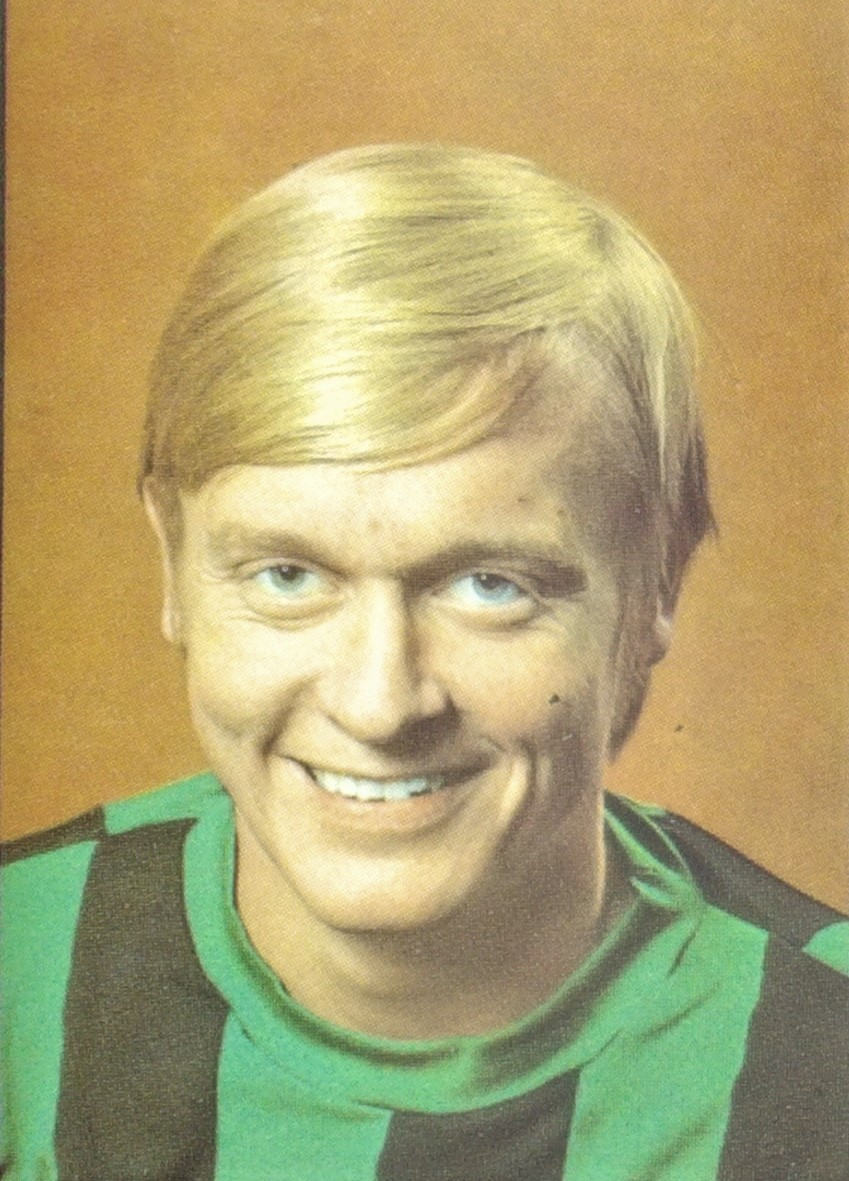

Personal information
- Full name: Eine Fredriksson
- Date of birth: 5 March 1950 (age 76)
- Place of birth: Tibro, Sweden
- Position: Midfielder

Senior career*
Years	Team	Apps	(Gls)
1970–1977	GAIS	148	(36)
1977-1984	IFK Norrköping	151	(15)

International career
1974-1980	Sweden	20	(3)
- * Club domestic league appearances and goals

Eine Fredriksson (born 5 March 1950) is a Swedish former football player.

During his club career, Fredriksson played for GAIS and IFK Norrköping.

Fredriksson made 20 appearances for the Sweden men's national football team between 1974 and 1980, scoring 3 goals.
