= Erkki Vihtilä =

Finnish footballer (born 1951)

Personal information
- Date of birth: 14 May 1951 (age 75)
- Position: Midfielder

Senior career*
Years	Team	Apps	(Gls)
- VaKP Valkeakoski
1971–1976	Ilves		
1977–1978	Reipas Lahti		
- Ilves
- Hakrit Rauma

International career
1971–1979	Finland	41	(0)
- * Club domestic league appearances and goals

Erkki Vihtilä (born 14 May 1951) is a Finnish former footballer who played as a midfielder. He made 41 appearances for the Finland national team from 1971 to 1979.
