= Hans Ewald Hansen =

Danish footballer (1944–2026

Personal information
- Date of birth: 15 February 1944
- Place of birth: Guldborgsund, German-occupied Denmark
- Date of death: 11 July 2026 (aged 82)
- Height: 1.79 m (5 ft 10 in)
- Position: Midfielder

International career
Years	Team	Apps	(Gls)
- Denmark

Hans Ewald Hansen (15 February 1944 – 11 July 2026) was a Danish footballer who played as a midfielder. He competed in the men's tournament at the 1972 Summer Olympics. Hansen died on 11 July 2026, at the age of 82.
