= Norway national football team =

Men's association football team

Norway
- Nickname(s): Røde, Hvite, Blå (Red, White and Blue); Landslaget (National Team); Drillos (Note: Team's nickname that was popular in the 1990s and early 2000s, in association with former player and manager Egil Olsen who was himself nicknamed Drillo, when the national team recorded some of its major achievements. Drillos could be rendered as "Drillo's Men" in English. The nickname has since become rarely used.)
- Association: Norges Fotballforbund (NFF)
- Confederation: UEFA (Europe)
- Head coach: Ståle Solbakken
- Captain: Martin Ødegaard
- Most caps: John Arne Riise (110)
- Top scorer: Erling Haaland (68)
- Home stadium: Ullevaal Stadion
- FIFA code: NOR
First colours	Second colours	Third colours

FIFA ranking
- Current: 19 (18 November 2026)
- Highest: 2 (October 1993, July–August 1995)
- Lowest: 88 (July 2017)

First international
- Sweden 11–3 Norway (Gothenburg, Sweden; 12 July 1908)

Biggest win
- Norway 12–0 Finland (Bergen, Norway; 28 June 1946)

Biggest defeat
- Denmark 12–0 Norway (Copenhagen, Denmark; 7 October 1917)

World Cup
- Appearances: 4 (first in 1938)
- Best result: Quarter-finals (2026)

European Championship
- Appearances: 1 (first in 2000)
- Best result: Group stage (2000)

Olympic Games
- Appearances: 5 (first in 1912)
- Best result: Third place (1936)
Medal record
Men's football
Olympic Games
Bronze medal – third place	1936 Nazi Germany	Team
- Website: fotball.no

The Norway national football team (Norwegian: Norges herrelandslag i fotball, or informally Landslaget) represents Norway in men's international football, and is controlled by the Norwegian Football Federation, the governing body for football in Norway. Norway's home ground is Ullevaal Stadion in Oslo, and their head coach is Ståle Solbakken, the captain is Martin Ødegaard and their all-time top scorer is Erling Haaland.

Norway's first participation in a major tournament finals was at the 1938 FIFA World Cup. During their first golden generation from 1990 to 1998, Norway ocuppied second place in the FIFA World Ranking and qualified for two FIFA World Cups in 1994, and 1998, and the UEFA European Championship in 2000. Afterwards, Norway failed to qualify for the next twelve major tournaments from 2001 to 2025, before qualifying to the 2026 FIFA World Cup under their second golden generation, where they had their deepest run in the tournament, reaching the quarter-finals for the first time in their history. Norway has long-standing football rivalries with Nordic neighbours Denmark and Sweden.

== History ==
The Norwegian team achieved third place in the 1936 Summer Olympics, after beating hosts Germany earlier in the tournament. Norway also qualified for the 1938 FIFA World Cup, where they lost 2–1 after extra time against eventual champions Italy, with this being their last appearance until 1994.

In the post-war years, Norway did not qualify for a World Cup or European Championship. Despite this, Norway achieved victories such as a 3–0 win against Yugoslavia in 1965, a 1–0 away win against France in 1968, and a 2–1 victory against England in 1981 that prompted radio commentator Bjørge Lillelien's famous "Your boys took a hell of a beating" rant.

Norway had their first football's Golden Age from 1990 to 1998 under coach Egil "Drillo" Olsen, with the team once being ranked No. 2. Olsen started his training career with Norway with a 6–1 home victory against Cameroon on 31 October 1990. In qualifying for the 1994 World Cup, Norway topped their group, finishing above the Netherlands and England, beating both teams in the process. During the finals in the United States, Norway was knocked out in the group stage after a win against Mexico, a defeat against Italy and a draw against the Republic of Ireland. Norway failed to qualify for the round of 16 as all four teams in the group finished with four points and identical goal difference.

At the 1998 World Cup in France, Norway was once again eliminated by Italy in the first round of the knockout stage after finishing second in their group, having drawn against Morocco and Scotland and winning 2–1 against Brazil.

Former under-21 coach Nils Johan Semb replaced Olsen after the latter's retirement. Under Semb's guidance, Norway qualified for Euro 2000, their last European Championship appearance to date. Semb resigned at the end of an unsuccessful qualifying campaign in 2003 and was replaced by Åge Hareide. Under Hareide, Norway came close to reaching both the 2006 World Cup and Euro 2008, but ultimately fell short on both occasions. Norway then failed to win a single game in the entirety of 2008, with Hareide resigning at the end of the year. His replacement, initially on a temporary basis, was Olsen, who began his second spell in charge with an away win against Germany, and subsequently signed a three-year contract. Olsen resigned in September 2013 after Norway lost at home to Switzerland and had limited chances to qualify for the 2014 World Cup with one game to spare. He was replaced with Per-Mathias Høgmo. Olsen later claimed he was sacked.

=== 2020–present: Rise to Prominence ===
During the qualification campaign for UEFA Euro 2020, Norway finished third in their group behind Spain and Sweden, missing direct qualification for the tournament. The team subsequently contested a playoff semifinal against Serbia in October 2020, but was defeated 1–2 and eliminated from contention. Norway then participated in the 2020–21 UEFA Nations League alongside Austria, Romania, and Northern Ireland, securing second place in the group and thereby retaining its position in League B for the following edition.

On 3 December 2020, former national team player Ståle Solbakken was appointed head coach following the departure of Lars Lagerbäck. In March 2021, Solbakken named Martin Ødegaard as team captain. Norway failed to qualify for both the 2022 FIFA World Cup and UEFA Euro 2024. In the World Cup qualifiers, they finished third in a group with the Netherlands and Turkey. Later, in the Euro 2024 qualifiers, they ended behind Spain and Scotland, missing out again. At the 2024–25 UEFA Nations League, Norway clinched direct promotion to League A after topping their group.

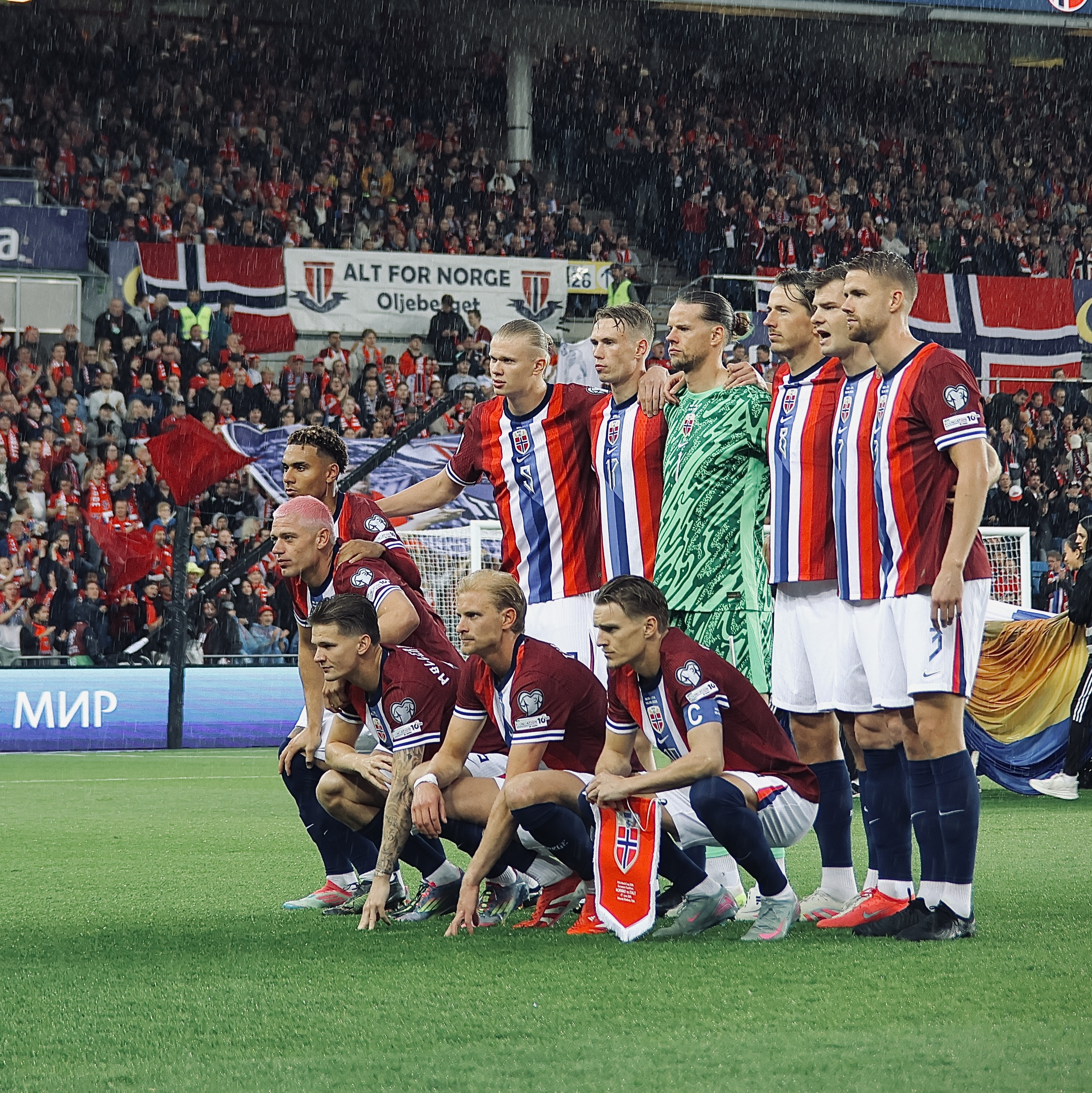
Norway in 2025

On 16 November 2025, Norway secured qualification for the 2026 FIFA World Cup, ending a 28-year absence from the tournament. The team won all eight of its qualifying matches and finished first in its group. The campaign concluded with a 4–1 victory over Italy in Milan, marking Italy's first-ever home defeat in a World Cup qualifying group-stage match. Erling Haaland emerged as the leading scorer across all qualifiers with 16 goals. For the tournament, Norway was drawn into Group I alongside Iraq, Senegal, and France.

On 17 June 2026, Norway opened its World Cup campaign with a 4–1 victory over Iraq, highlighted by two goals from Haaland, who became the first Norwegian player to score multiple goals in a World Cup match. It was also the first time Norway had scored more than two goals in a World Cup fixture. The team followed up with a 3–2 win against Senegal, securing advancement to the Round of 32 prior to its final group-stage match against France. They were defeated 4–1 in a dead rubber, marking the first ever time they lost to a World Cup match to an opponent other than Italy (who failed to qualify for the tournament after losing on penalties to Bosnia and Herzegovina in the qualification playoffs). In the Round of 32, Norway won 2–1 against Ivory Coast and advanced to the Round of 16 match against Brazil. This was the first time Norway won a match outside the group stages. Norway is one of only three national teams with a winning record against Brazil, and the only team to have never lost against them, with three wins and two draws in five matches, including their 2026 round of 16 match. The run ended in the quarter-finals, where Norway lost 1–2 to England after extra time.

== Team image ==
=== Crest ===
Original badge of the Norwegian national team

Norway has used the national flag on a white circle as their badge since the 1920s. In May 2008, the NFF unveiled a new crest, a Viking-style Dragon wrapped around the NFF logo. After massive public pressure the crest was dropped. In the 1980s and the 1990s, Norway used the NFF logo in the opposite breast of the shirt together with the national flag on a white circle. On 12 December 2014, a new crest was presented. The crest primarily features the national flag; in addition, there are two lions taken from the Norwegian coat of arms on the top. The lions face each other while holding a blue miniature of the NFF logo, and between the lions and above the NFF logo is the word "NORGE" (Norway) in blue letters. They also wore a special gold version of their logo against Italy on 16 November 2025, to commemorate their qualification for World Cup 2026 after a 28-year wait.

=== Kit suppliers ===
Adidas supplied Norway's kit from 1992 to 1996, with Umbro taking over until 2014. On 10 September 2014, the NFF and Nike announced a new partnership, that made the sportswear provider the official Norwegian team kit supplier from 1 January 2015.

Kit provider	Period
(France) Le Coq Sportif	1976–1980
(Denmark) Hummel	1981–1991
(Germany) Adidas	1992–1996
(United Kingdom) Umbro	1996–2014
(United States) Nike	2015–present

=== Chant ===
As of the 2026 FIFA World Cup, the supporters of the team have been performing the Viking Row chant created by Ole Frøystad.

== Results and fixtures ==
The following is a list of match results in the last 12 months, as well as any future matches that have been scheduled.

Win Draw Loss Fixture

=== 2026 ===
27 March 2026 Friendly	Netherlands	2–1	Norway	Amsterdam, Netherlands
20:45 UTC+1	Van Dijk 35'; Reijnders 51'	Report	Schjelderup 24'	Stadium: Johan Cruyff Arena; Attendance: 50,327; Referee: Lawrence Visser (Belgium)

31 March 2026 Friendly	Norway	0–0	Switzerland	Oslo, Norway
20:45 UTC+2		Report		Stadium: Ullevaal Stadion; Attendance: 23,913; Referee: Jasper Vergoote (Belgium)

1 June 2026 Friendly	Norway	3–1	Sweden	Oslo, Norway
19:00 UTC+2	Larsen 9', 37'; Nusa 18'	Report	Isak 76'	Stadium: Ullevaal Stadion; Attendance: 25,138; Referee: Balázs Berke (Hungary)

7 June 2026 Friendly	Morocco	1–1	Norway	Harrison, United States
15:00 UTC-4	Brahim 8'	Report	Ødegaard 75'	Stadium: Sports Illustrated Stadium; Attendance: 25,000; Referee: Pierre-Luc Lauzière (Canada)

16 June 2026 2026 FIFA World Cup Group I	Iraq	1–4	Norway	Foxborough, United States
18:00 UTC−4	Hussein 39'	Report	Haaland 29', 43'; Østigård 76'; Hussein 90+6' (o.g.)	Stadium: Gillette Stadium; Attendance: 63,106; Referee: Pierre Atcho (Gabon)

22 June 2026 2026 FIFA World Cup Group I	Norway	3–2	Senegal	East Rutherford, United States
20:00 UTC−4	M. H. Pedersen 43'; Haaland 48', 58'	Report	I. Sarr 53', 90+3'	Stadium: MetLife Stadium; Attendance: 80,663; Referee: Wilton Sampaio (Brazil)

26 June 2026 2026 FIFA World Cup Group I	Norway	1–4	France	Foxborough, United States
15:00 UTC−4	Aasgaard 21'	Report	Dembélé 7', 20', 32'; Doué 90+4'	Stadium: Gillette Stadium; Attendance: 64,146; Referee: Michael Oliver (England)

30 June 2026 2026 FIFA World Cup Round of 32	Ivory Coast	1–2	Norway	Arlington, United States
12:00 UTC−5	Diallo 74'	Report	Nusa 39'; Haaland 86'	Stadium: AT&T Stadium; Attendance: 69,665; Referee: Jesús Valenzuela (Venezuela)

5 July 2026 2026 FIFA World Cup Round of 16	Brazil	1–2	Norway	East Rutherford, United States
16:00 UTC−4	Neymar 90+10' (pen.)	Report	Haaland 79', 90'	Stadium: MetLife Stadium; Attendance: 80,663; Referee: Ismail Elfath (United States)

11 July 2026 2026 FIFA World Cup Quarterfinal	Norway	1–2 (a.e.t.)	England	Miami Gardens, United States
17:00 UTC−4	Schjelderup 36'	Report	Bellingham 45+2', 93'	Stadium: Hard Rock Stadium; Attendance: 64,478; Referee: Clément Turpin (France)

24 September 2026 2026–27 UEFA Nations League	Norway	3–2	Denmark	Oslo, Norway
20:45 UTC+2	Bobb 14'; Haaland 18', 74'	Report	Damsgaard 25'; Højlund 60'	Stadium: Ullevaal Stadion; Attendance: 25,002; Referee: Tobias Stieler (Germany)

27 September 2026 2026–27 UEFA Nations League	Norway	1–2	Portugal	Oslo, Norway
20:45 UTC+2	Haaland 51'	Report	Félix 17'; Ramos 54'	Stadium: Ullevaal Stadion; Attendance: 25,953; Referee: François Letexier (France)

1 October 2026 2026–27 UEFA Nations League	Wales	2–1	Norway	Cardiff, Wales
19:45 UTC+1	James 38'; Williams 48'	Report	Bobb 11'	Stadium: Cardiff City Stadium; Attendance: 32,076; Referee: Alejandro Hernández Hernández (Spain)

4 October 2026 2026–27 UEFA Nations League	Portugal	2–1	Norway	Porto, Portugal
19:45 UTC+1	Cancelo 38'; Ramos 79'; Conceição (yellow card) 86' (yellow-red card) 86'	Report	Ajer 36'	Stadium: Estádio do Dragão; Attendance: 48,832; Referee: Maurizio Mariani (Italy)

14 November 2026 2026–27 UEFA Nations League	Norway	3–1	Wales	Oslo, Norway
18:00 UTC+1	Nusa 59'; Schjelderup 68'; Haaland 88' (pen.)	Report	Brooks 79'	Stadium: Ullevaal Stadion; Attendance: 25,317; Referee: Oleksii Derevinskyi (Ukraine)

17 November 2026 2026–27 UEFA Nations League	Denmark	2–3	Norway	Copenhagen, Denmark
20:45 UTC+1	Højlund 11'; Højbjerg 14'	Report	Haaland 37', 90+6' (pen.); Ødegaard 83'	Stadium: Parken Stadium; Attendance: 36,047; Referee: Halil Umut Meler (Turkey)

=== 2027 ===
27 March 2026–27 Nations League QF 1st Leg	Norway	v	England	Norway
--:--

30 March 2026–27 Nations League QF 2nd Leg	England	v	Norway	England
--:--

== Coaching staff ==
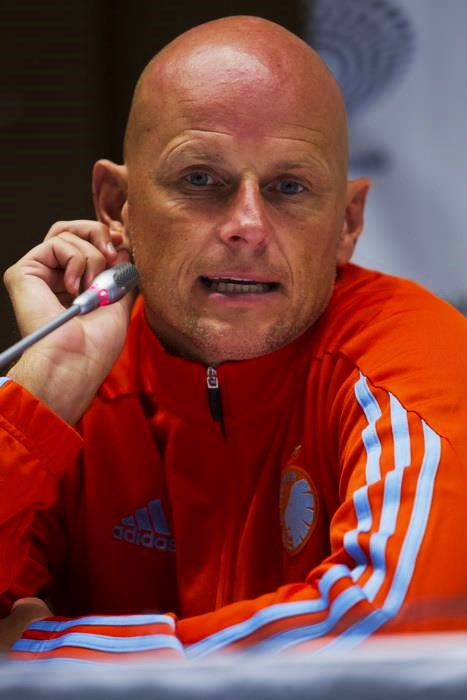
Ståle Solbakken is currently the manager of Norway

Position	Name
Head coach	(Norway) Ståle Solbakken
Assistant coach	(Norway) Kent Bergersen
Fitness coach	(Norway) Bjørn Vidar Stenersen
Match analysts	(England) Andy Findlay (Norway) Pål Fjelde
Sports coordinator	(Norway) Brede Hangeland
Physiotherapist	(Italy) Mario Pafundi
Sports scientist	(Norway) Johannes Marthinussen
Chief instructor	(United States) Bryant Lazaro
Team manager	(Norway) Bård Wiggen

=== Coaching history ===
As of 18 November 2026

The following is a list of all managers of the national team. Prior to 1953, the team was selected by a selection committee, which also continued to select the team until 1969.

Manager	Tenure	P	W	D	L	F	A	Finals
(Austria) Willibald Hahn	1 August 1953 – 31 December 1955	26	7	7	12	28	42	
(England) Ron Lewin	1 January 1956 – 31 December 1957	17	5	4	8	25	38	
(Poland) Edmund Majowski	1 January 1958 – 15 September 1958	5	3	1	1	10	8	
(Norway) Ragnar Larsen	16 September 1958 – 31 December 1958	1	0	0	1	1	4	
(Norway) Kristian Henriksen	1 January 1959 – 31 December 1959	10	3	0	7	15	29	
(Austria) Wilhelm Kment	1 January 1960 – 15 August 1962	20	6	2	12	32	45	
(Norway) Ragnar Larsen	16 August 1962 – 31 December 1966	33	11	7	15	47	74	
(Austria) Wilhelm Kment	1 January 1967 – 31 December 1969	25	9	3	13	39	61	
(Norway) Øivind Johannessen	1 January 1970 – 31 December 1971	17	4	2	11	18	43	
(England) George Curtis	1 January 1972 – August 1974	17	3	2	12	17	30	
(Norway) Kjell Schou-Andreassen (Norway) Nils Arne Eggen	August 1974 – 31 December 1977	27	6	4	17	26	52	
(Norway) Tor Røste Fossen	1 January 1978 – 30 June 1987	94	28	28	38	96	119	
(Sweden) Tord Grip	1 July 1987 – 30 June 1988	7	0	4	3	3	7	
(Norway) Ingvar Stadheim	1 July 1988 – 10 October 1990	24	5	8	11	32	37	
(Norway) Egil Olsen	11 October 1990 – 30 June 1998	88	46	26	16	168	63	1994 World Cup – Group stage 1998 World Cup – Round of 16
(Norway) Nils Johan Semb	1 July 1998 – 31 December 2003	68	29	21	18	89	61	Euro 2000 – Group stage
(Norway) Åge Hareide	1 January 2004 – 8 December 2008	58	24	18	16	88	65	
(Norway) Egil Olsen	14 January 2009 – 27 September 2013	49	25	8	16	61	50	
(Norway) Per-Mathias Høgmo	27 September 2013 – 16 November 2016	35	10	7	18	33	49	
(Sweden) Lars Lagerbäck	1 February 2017 – 6 December 2020	34	18	9	8	60	34	
(Norway) Leif Gunnar Smerud (Note: Led the team that was dubbed "koronalandslaget", due to the entire national squad was put in quarantine)	18 November 2020	1	0	1	0	1	1	
(Norway) Ståle Solbakken	7 December 2020 –	68	39	12	17	150	75	2026 World Cup – Quarterfinals

== Players ==
=== Current squad ===
The following 25 players were called up to the 2026–27 UEFA Nations League A, matches on 14 November and 17 November 2026, respectively.
Caps and goals correct as of 17 November, after the match against Denmark.

No.	Pos.	Player	Date of birth (age)	Caps	Goals	Club
1	GK	Ørjan Nyland	10 September 1990 (age 36)	80	0	(German Football Association) RB Leipzig
12	GK	Sander Tangvik	29 November 2002 (age 23)	0	0	(German Football Association) Hamburger SV
13	GK	Egil Selvik	30 July 1997 (age 29)	10	0	(French Football Federation) Brest
2	DF	Odin Bjørtuft	19 December 1998 (age 27)	1	0	(Norwegian Football Federation) Bodø/Glimt
3	DF	Kristoffer Ajer	17 April 1998 (age 28)	63	3	(The Football Association) Brentford
4	DF	Leo Østigård	28 November 1999 (age 26)	48	2	(Italian Football Federation) Genoa
5	DF	David Møller Wolfe	23 April 2002 (age 24)	32	1	(German Football Association) Hamburger SV
14	DF	Julian Ryerson	17 November 1997 (age 29)	52	1	(German Football Association) Borussia Dortmund
16	DF	Marcus Holmgren Pedersen	16 July 2000 (age 26)	38	1	(Hellenic Football Federation) Olympiacos
17	DF	Torbjørn Heggem	12 January 1999 (age 27)	25	0	(Italian Football Federation) Bologna
23	DF	Eivind Helland	25 April 2005 (age 21)	2	0	(Italian Football Federation) Bologna
6	MF	Patrick Berg	24 November 1997 (age 28)	54	0	(Norwegian Football Federation) Bodø/Glimt
8	MF	Sander Berge	14 February 1998 (age 28)	77	1	(The Football Association) Fulham
10	MF	Martin Ødegaard (Captain)	17 December 1998 (age 27)	79	6	(The Football Association) Arsenal
15	MF	Hugo Vetlesen	29 February 2000 (age 26)	6	1	(Royal Belgian Football Association) Club Brugge
18	MF	Felix Horn Myhre	4 March 1999 (age 27)	8	2	(The Football Association) West Bromwich Albion
19	MF	Thelo Aasgaard	2 May 2002 (age 24)	13	6	(Royal Belgian Football Association) Anderlecht
7	FW	Alexander Sørloth	5 December 1995 (age 30)	78	26	(Royal Spanish Football Federation) Atlético Madrid
9	FW	Erling Haaland (Vice-Captain)	21 July 2000 (age 26)	61	68	(The Football Association) Manchester City
11	FW	Erik Botheim	10 January 2000 (age 26)	2	0	(Norwegian Football Federation) Viking
20	FW	Antonio Nusa	17 April 2005 (age 21)	36	10	(German Football Association) RB Leipzig
21	FW	Andreas Schjelderup	1 June 2004 (age 22)	24	3	(Portuguese Football Federation) Benfica
22	FW	Oscar Bobb	12 July 2003 (age 23)	32	4	(The Football Association) Fulham

=== Recent call-ups ===
The following players have also been called up for the Norway squad within the last twelve months.

Pos.	Player	Date of birth (age)	Caps	Goals	Club	Latest call-up
GK	Viljar Myhra	21 July 1996 (age 30)	0	0	(Denmark) OB	v. Switzerland, 21 March 2026
DF	Fredrik Sjøvold	17 August 2003 (age 23)	0	0	(Norway) Bodø/Glimt	v. Portugal, 4 October 2026
DF	Sondre Langås	2 February 2001 (age 25)	4	0	(England) Derby County	v. Portugal, 4 October 2026
DF	Fredrik André Bjørkan ^{RET}	21 August 1998 (age 28)	22	1	(Norway) Bodø/Glimt	2026 FIFA World Cup
DF	Henrik Falchener	8 May 2003 (age 23)	2	0	(Norway) Viking	2026 FIFA World Cup
MF	Fredrik Aursnes ^{INJ}	10 December 1995 (age 30)	32	1	(Portugal) Benfica	v. Wales, 14 November 2026
MF	Kristian Thorstvedt	13 March 1999 (age 27)	40	4	(Italy) Sassuolo	v. Portugal, 4 October 2026
MF	Morten Thorsby	5 May 1996 (age 30)	32	0	(Italy) Cremonese	2026 FIFA World Cup
FW	Jørgen Strand Larsen ^{INJ}	6 February 2000 (age 26)	33	6	(England) Crystal Palace	v. Wales, 14 November 2026
FW	Ole Didrik Blomberg	12 June 2000 (age 26)	0	0	(Norway) Bodø/Glimt	v. Portugal, 4 October 2026
FW	Jens Petter Hauge	12 October 1999 (age 27)	16	1	(Norway) Bodø/Glimt	2026 FIFA World Cup
^{INJ} Withdrew due to injury^{PRE} Preliminary squad / standby^{RET} Retired from the national team^{SUS} Serving suspension^{QUA} Placed in mandatory quarantine^{WD} Withdrew due to non-injury issue.^{EX} Player expelled from the squad due to non-injury issue.

== Player records ==
As of 17 November 2026.
Players in bold are still active with Norway.

=== Most appearances ===
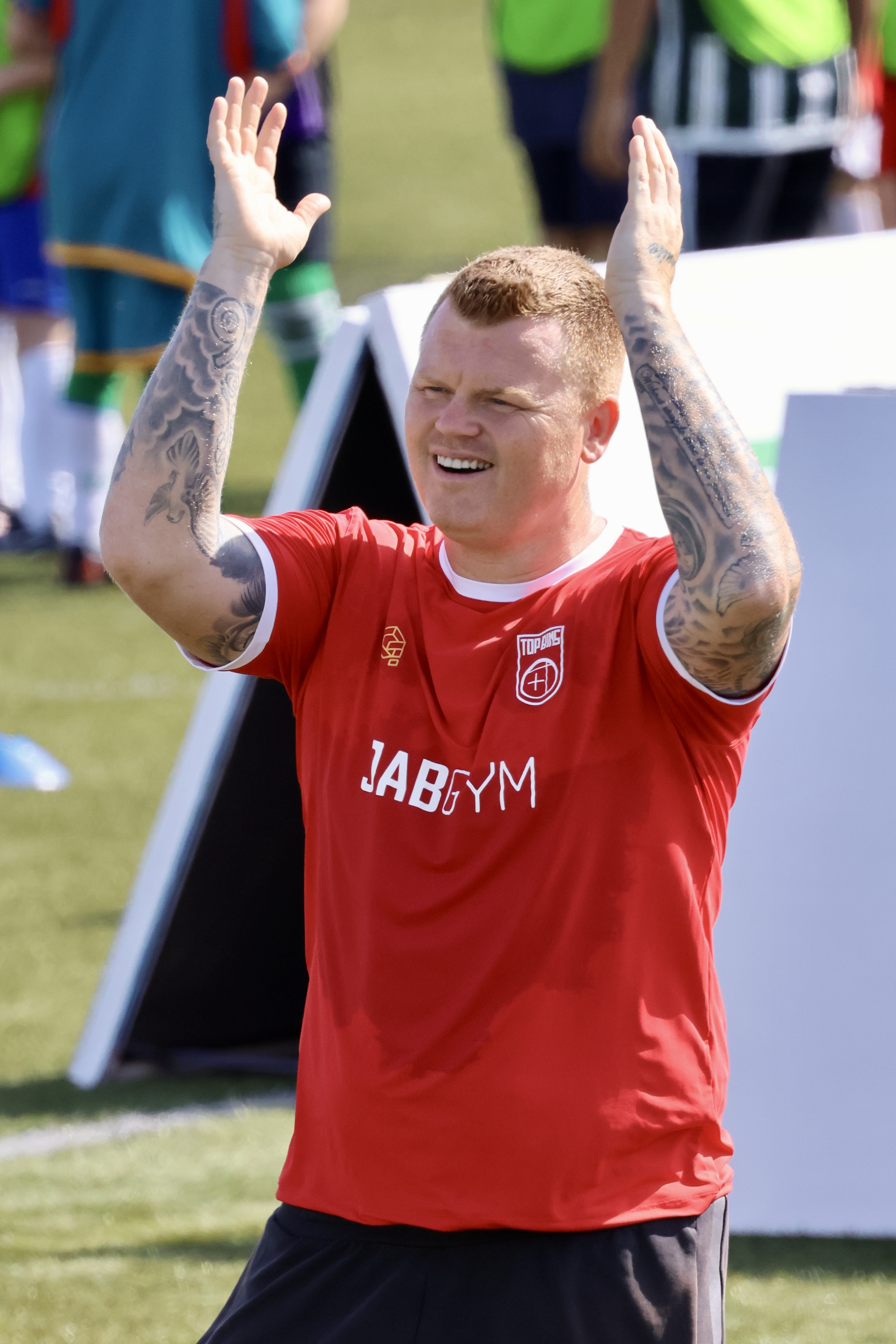
John Arne Riise is Norway's most capped player with 110 appearances.

Rank	Player	Caps	Goals	Career
1	John Arne Riise	110	16	2000–2013
2	Thorbjørn Svenssen	104	0	1947–1962
3	Henning Berg	100	9	1992–2004
4	Erik Thorstvedt	97	0	1982–1996
5	John Carew	91	24	1998–2011
5	Brede Hangeland	91	4	2002–2014
7	Øyvind Leonhardsen	86	19	1990–2003
8	Morten Gamst Pedersen	83	17	2004–2014
8	Kjetil Rekdal	83	17	1987–2000
10	**Ørjan Nyland**	80	0	2013–present

=== Top goalscorers ===
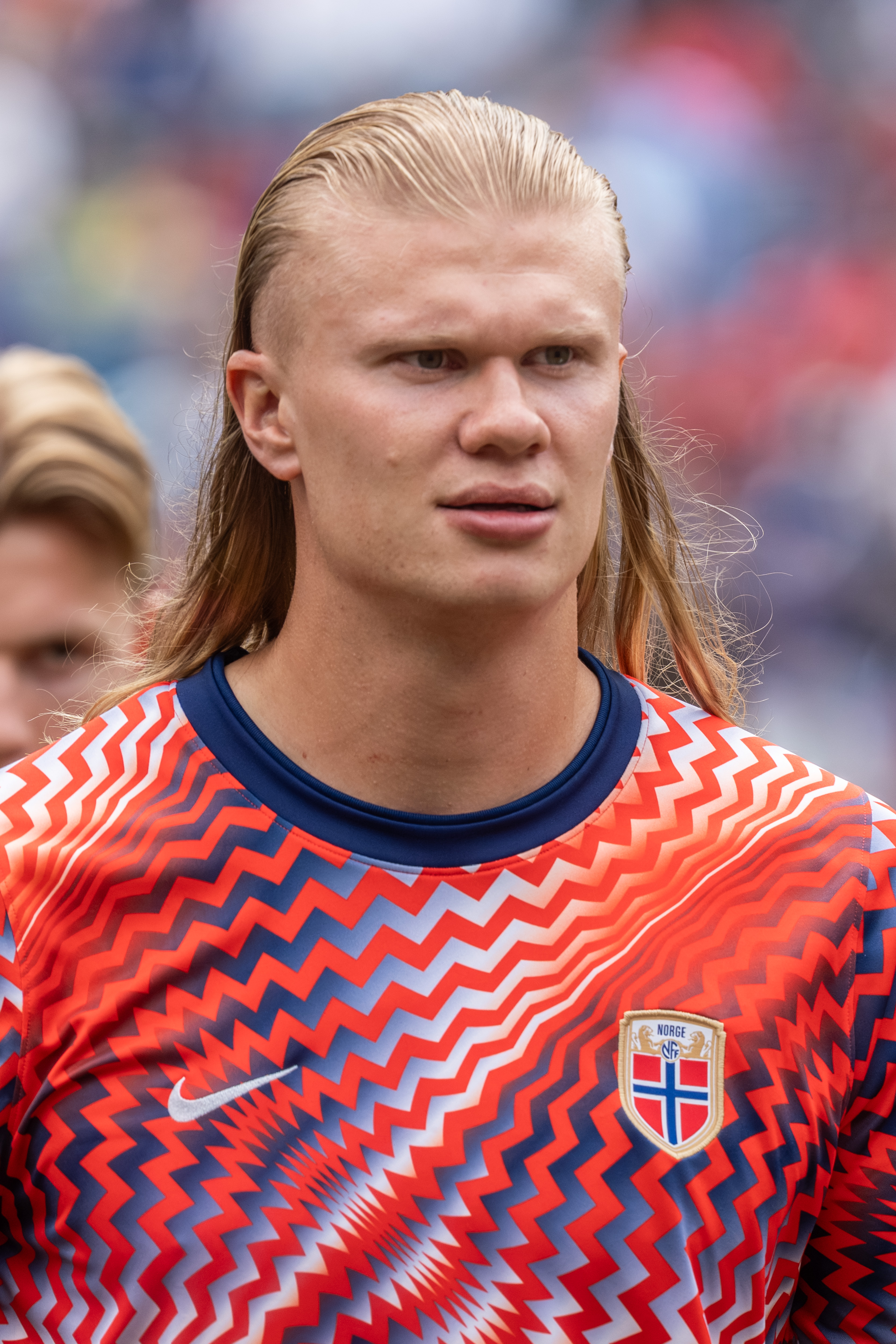
Erling Haaland is Norway's all-time top goalscorer with 68 goals.

Rank	Player	Goals	Caps	Average	Career
1	**Erling Haaland** (list)	68	61	1.11	2019–present
2	Jørgen Juve	33	45	0.73	1928–1937
3	Einar Gundersen	26	33	0.79	1917–1928
3	**Alexander Sørloth**	26	78	0.33	2016–present
5	Harald Hennum	25	43	0.58	1949–1960
6	John Carew	24	91	0.26	1998–2011
7	Ole Gunnar Solskjær	23	67	0.34	1995–2007
7	Tore André Flo	23	76	0.3	1995–2004
9	Gunnar Thoresen	22	64	0.34	1946–1959
10	Steffen Iversen	21	79	0.27	1998–2011

== Competitive record ==
=== FIFA World Cup ===
FIFA World Cup record										Qualification record						
Year	Result	Pos.	Pld	W	D	L	GF	GA	Squad	Pos.	Pld	W	D	L	GF	GA
(Uruguay) 1930	Did not enter									Did not enter						
(Kingdom of Italy) 1934	Did not enter									Did not enter						
(French Fourth Republic) 1938	Round of 16	12th	1	0	0	1	1	2	Squad	1st	2	1	1	0	6	5
(Fourth Brazilian Republic) 1950	Did not enter									Did not enter						
(Switzerland) 1954	Did not qualify									3rd	4	0	2	2	4	9
(Sweden) 1958	Did not qualify									3rd	4	1	0	3	3	15
(Chile) 1962	Did not qualify									3rd	4	0	0	4	3	11
(England) 1966	Did not qualify									2nd	6	3	1	2	10	5
(Mexico) 1970	Did not qualify									3rd	4	1	0	3	4	13
(West Germany) 1974	Did not qualify									3rd	6	2	0	4	9	16
(Argentina) 1978	Did not qualify									2nd	4	2	0	2	3	4
(Spain) 1982	Did not qualify									5th	8	2	2	4	8	15
(Mexico) 1986	Did not qualify									5th	8	1	3	4	4	10
(Italy) 1990	Did not qualify									4th	8	2	2	4	10	9
(United States) 1994	Group stage	17th	3	1	1	1	1	1	Squad	1st	10	7	2	1	25	5
(France) 1998	Round of 16	15th	4	1	2	1	5	5	Squad	1st	8	6	2	0	21	2
(South Korea) (Japan) 2002	Did not qualify									4th	10	2	4	4	12	14
(Germany) 2006	Did not qualify									2nd (P/O)	12	5	3	4	12	9
(South Africa) 2010	Did not qualify									2nd	8	2	4	2	9	7
(Brazil) 2014	Did not qualify									4th	10	3	3	4	10	13
(Russia) 2018	Did not qualify									4th	10	4	1	5	17	16
(Qatar) 2022	Did not qualify									3rd	10	5	3	2	15	8
(Canada) (Mexico) (United States) 2026	Quarter-finals	5th	6	4	0	2	13	11	Squad	1st	8	8	0	0	37	5
(Morocco) (Portugal) (Spain) 2030	To be determined									To be determined						
(Saudi Arabia) 2034	To be determined									To be determined						
Total	Quarter-finals	4/23	14	6	3	5	20	19	—	—	144	57	33	54	222	191

=== UEFA European Championship ===
UEFA European Championship record										Qualification record						
Year	Result	Pos.	Pld	W	D	L	GF	GA	Squad	Pos.	Pld	W	D	L	GF	GA
(France) 1960	Did not qualify									R16	2	0	0	2	2	6
(Francoist Spain) 1964	Did not qualify									PR	2	0	1	1	1	3
(Italy) 1968	Did not qualify									4th	6	1	1	4	9	14
(Belgium) 1972	Did not qualify									4th	6	0	1	5	5	18
(Socialist Federal Republic of Yugoslavia) 1976	Did not qualify									4th	6	1	0	5	5	15
(Italy) 1980	Did not qualify									5th	8	0	1	7	5	20
(France) 1984	Did not qualify									4th	6	1	2	3	7	8
(West Germany) 1988	Did not qualify									5th	8	1	2	5	5	12
(Sweden) 1992	Did not qualify									3rd	8	3	3	2	9	5
(England) 1996	Did not qualify									3rd	10	6	2	2	17	7
(Belgium) (Netherlands) 2000	Group stage	9th	3	1	1	1	1	1	Squad	1st	10	8	1	1	21	9
(Portugal) 2004	Did not qualify									2nd (P/O)	10	4	2	4	10	10
(Austria) (Switzerland) 2008	Did not qualify									3rd	12	7	2	3	27	11
(Poland) (Ukraine) 2012	Did not qualify									3rd	8	5	1	2	10	7
(France) 2016	Did not qualify									3rd (P/O)	12	6	1	5	14	13
(Europe) 2020	Did not qualify									3rd (P/O)	11	4	5	2	20	13
(Germany) 2024	Did not qualify									3rd	8	3	2	3	14	12
(United Kingdom) (Republic of Ireland) 2028	To be determined									To be determined						
(Italy) (Turkey) 2032	To be determined									To be determined						
Total	Group stage	1/17	3	1	1	1	1	1	—	—	133	50	27	56	181	183

=== UEFA Nations League ===
UEFA Nations League record
League phase / quarter-finals												Finals								
Season	LG	Grp	Pos	Pld	W	D	L	GF	GA	P/R	IR	Year	Pld	W	D*	L	GF	GA	Squad	OR
2018–19	C	3	1st	6	4	1	1	7	2	▲	26th	(Portugal) 2019	Did not qualify							
2020–21	B	1	2nd	6	3	1	2	12	7	Same position	22nd	(Italy) 2021	Did not qualify							
2022–23	B	4	2nd	6	3	1	2	7	7	Same position	24th	(Netherlands) 2023	Did not qualify							
2024–25	B	3	1st	6	4	1	1	15	7	▲	12th	(Germany) 2025	Did not qualify							
2026–27	A	4	1st	6	5	0	1	13	10	Same position	8th	2027	To be determined							
2026–27	A	Quarter-final		0	0	0	0	0	0	Same position	8th	2027	To be determined							
Total				30	17	4	9	53	34	12th		Total Finals:0/4	0	0	0	0	0	0	TBD	

=== Olympic Games ===
Olympic Games record
Year	Result	Pld	W	D	L	GF	GA	Squad
(United Kingdom) 1908	Did not enter							
(Sweden) 1912	Quarter-finals	1	0	0	1	0	7	Squad
(Belgium) 1920	Quarter-finals	2	1	0	1	3	5	Squad
(France) 1924	Did not enter							
(Netherlands) 1928	Did not enter							
(Nazi Germany) 1936	Third place	4	3	0	1	10	4	Squad
(United Kingdom) 1948	Did not enter							
(Finland) 1952	Round of 16	1	0	0	1	1	4	Squad
(Australia) 1956	Did not enter							
(Italy) 1960	Did not qualify							
(Japan) 1964	Did not enter							
(Mexico) 1968	Did not enter							
(West Germany) 1972	Did not enter							
(Canada) 1976	Did not enter							
(Soviet Union) 1980	Qualified, but later withdrew							
(United States) 1984	Group stage	3	1	1	1	3	2	Squad
(South Korea) 1988	Did not qualify							
Since 1992	Olympic football has been an under-23 tournament							
Total	Third place	11	5	1	5	17	22	—

== All-time team record ==
The following table shows Norway's all-time international record, correct as of 4 October 2026.

Key

More wins than losses
As many wins as losses
Fewer wins than losses

Norway's all-time international record, since 1908
Opponents	Played	Won	Drawn*	Lost	GF	GA	GD	% Won
Albania	5	2	2	1	6	5	+1	50%
Argentina	2	2	0	0	3	1	+2	100%
Armenia	3	2	1	0	13	1	+12	50%
Australia	3	1	1	1	6	4	+2	50%
Austria	14	3	2	9	13	30	−17	21.42%
Azerbaijan	6	4	1	1	9	1	+8	57%
Bahrain	1	1	0	0	1	0	+1	100%
Belarus	7	3	2	2	9	5	+4	43%
Belgium	9	0	3	6	8	17	−9	0%
Bermuda	2	2	0	0	6	1	+5	100%
Bosnia and Herzegovina	4	2	0	2	5	3	+2	50%
Brazil	5	3	2	0	10	6	+4	60%
Bulgaria	18	5	5	8	16	31	−15	28%
Cameroon	1	1	0	0	6	1	+5	100%
Chile	1	0	1	0	0	0	0	0%
China	1	0	0	1	1	2	-1	0%
Colombia	1	0	1	0	0	0	0	0%
Costa Rica	2	1	1	0	1	0	+1	50%
Croatia	5	1	1	3	6	10	−4	20%
Cyprus	13	13	0	0	35	5	+30	100%
Czechoslovakia	5	0	1	4	5	13	−8	0%
Czech Republic	9	1	3	5	9	12	−3	11%
Denmark	92	22	15	55	111	234	−122	23.91%
East Germany	9	1	2	6	8	15	−7	11%
Egypt	6	3	3	0	7	2	+5	50%
England	15	2	4	9	15	35	−20	13%
Estonia	9	6	2	1	21	6	+15	66.67%
Faroe Islands	5	5	0	0	17	0	+17	100%
Finland	68	42	17	9	183	82	+101	61.76%
France	17	4	4	9	17	28	−11	23.52%
Georgia	5	4	1	0	9	3	+6	80%
Germany	15	2	4	9	11	34	−23	13%
Ghana	1	1	0	0	3	2	+1	100%
Gibraltar	2	2	0	0	8	1	+7	100%
Greece	9	2	2	5	10	13	−3	28%
Grenada	1	1	0	0	2	1	+1	100%
Guatemala	1	1	0	0	3	1	+2	100%
Honduras	1	1	0	0	3	1	+2	100%
Hungary	21	7	6	8	26	36	−9	33%
Iceland	34	20	6	8	64	35	+29	59%
Iraq	1	1	0	0	4	1	+3	100%
Israel	5	4	0	1	16	4	+12	80%
Italy	20	6	4	10	24	24	0	30%
Ivory Coast	1	1	0	0	2	1	+1	100%
Jamaica	2	1	1	0	7	1	+6	50%
Japan	1	1	0	0	3	0	+3	100%
Jordan	2	1	1	0	6	0	+6	50%
Kazakhstan	2	1	1	0	5	0	+5	50%
Kosovo	1	1	0	0	3	0	+3	100%
Kuwait	3	0	2	1	3	4	−1	0%
Latvia	4	2	1	1	5	4	−1	50%
Lithuania	2	2	0	0	2	0	+2	100%
Luxembourg	12	9	1	2	25	9	+15	73%
Malta	12	10	2	0	30	4	+26	83%
Mexico	6	2	1	3	8	11	−3	33%
Moldova	7	6	1	0	22	2	+20	85.71%
Montenegro	4	3	0	1	6	4	+2	66%
Morocco	2	0	2	0	3	3	0	0%
Netherlands	22	5	6	11	28	48	−20	22.73%
New Zealand	2	1	1	0	4	1	+3	50%
Nigeria	1	0	1	0	2	2	0	0%
North Korea	1	1	0	0	3	0	+3	100%
North Macedonia	4	2	1	1	4	3	+1	50%
Northern Ireland	11	9	0	2	25	10	+15	82%
Oman	1	1	0	0	2	1	+1	100%
Panama	1	1	0	0	1	0	+1	100%
Paraguay	1	0	1	0	2	2	0	0%
Poland	21	4	3	14	26	60	−34	18%
Portugal	13	1	2	10	7	22	−15	7.69%
Qatar	2	2	0	0	8	1	+7	100%
Republic of Ireland	21	5	9	7	23	31	−8	24%
Romania	14	3	7	4	14	14	0	21%
Russia	16	1	5	10	10	31	−21	16%
Saar	2	0	1	1	2	3	−1	0%
San Marino	4	4	0	0	24	1	+23	100%
Saudi Arabia	1	1	0	0	6	0	+6	100%
Scotland	19	3	7	9	22	32	−10	16%
Senegal	2	1	0	1	4	4	0	50.00%
Serbia	4	1	1	2	3	5	−2	25%
Serbia and Montenegro	1	1	0	0	1	0	+1	100%
Singapore	1	1	0	0	5	2	+3	100%
Slovakia	4	3	1	0	6	1	+5	75%
Slovenia	13	8	3	2	24	11	+13	61.53%
South Africa	3	2	0	1	3	2	+1	67%
South Korea	5	2	1	2	8	6	+2	40%
Spain	10	1	2	7	4	16	−12	10%
Sweden	112	27	26	59	156	281	−125	24.10%
Switzerland	22	8	7	7	26	21	+5	36.36%
Thailand	2	2	0	0	8	0	+8	100%
Trinidad and Tobago	1	0	0	1	2	3	−1	0%
Tunisia	2	1	1	0	2	1	+1	50%
Turkey	11	3	3	5	15	14	+1	27%
Ukraine	5	0	1	4	0	5	−5	0%
United Arab Emirates	3	1	2	0	5	2	+3	50%
United States	5	2	1	2	14	8	+6	40%
Uruguay	2	0	1	1	2	3	−1	0%
Wales	13	4	4	5	16	19	−3	30.76%
West Germany	9	2	1	6	9	25	−16	22%
Yugoslavia	13	2	1	10	15	29	−14	16%
Zambia	1	0	1	0	0	0	0	0%
Total	918	340	211	365	1401	1469	−68	37.36%

== Honours ==
=== Global ===
- Olympic Games
  - Third place: 1936

=== Regional ===
- Nordic Football Championship
  - Champions: 1929–32
  - Runners-up: 1952–55, 1956–59
  - Third place: 1924–28, 1933–36, 1937–47, 1948–51, 1960–63, 1968–71, 1972–77, 1978–80, 1981–85

=== Friendly ===
- Malta International Football Tournament
  - Champions: 1990
- Lunar New Year Cup
  - Champions: 2001, 2004

=== Summary ===
Competition	1st place, gold medalist(s)	2nd place, silver medalist(s)	3rd place, bronze medalist(s)	Total
Olympic Games	0	0	1	1
Total	0	0	1	1

== See also ==
- Football in Norway
- Norway women's national football team
- Norway national under-21 football team
- Norway national under-20 football team
- Norway national under-19 football team
- Norway national under-17 football team
- Sápmi football team
- Viking Row
