= 1981–85 Nordic Football Championship =

Football tournament

Tournament details
- Host countries: Denmark; Finland; Norway; Sweden
- Dates: 14 May 1981 – 22 May 1985
- Teams: 4

Final positions
- Champions: Denmark (3rd title)
- Runners-up: Sweden
- Third place: Norway
- Fourth place: Finland

Tournament statistics
- Matches played: 12
- Goals scored: 31 (2.58 per match)
- Top scorer(s): Seven players (2 goals each)

The 1981–85 Nordic Football Championship was the 13th Nordic Football Championship staged. Four Nordic countries participated: Denmark, Finland, Norway and Sweden. Denmark won the tournament, its third Nordic Championship win.

== Results ==
=== 1981 ===
14 May 1981

Sweden	1-2	Denmark
Börjesen 75'		Bastrup 63'; Elkjær 72'

Malmö Stadion, Malmö
Attendance: 12,807
Referee: Volker Roth (Germany)
2 July 1981

Finland	3-1	Norway
Kousa 31'; Rajaniemi 60'; Turunen 61'		Davidsen 47'

Olympic Stadium, Helsinki
Attendance: 9,941
Referee: Peer Frickmann (Denmark)
29 July 1981

Sweden	1-0	Finland
Björklund 16'	Report

Örjans Vall, Halmstad
Attendance: 9,595
Referee: Ole Amundsen (Denmark)
12 August 1981

Finland	1-2	Denmark
Valvee 17'		Lauridsen 27'; Eigenbrod 84'

Tammela Stadion, Tampere
Attendance: 4,300
Referee: Rolf Eriksson (Sweden)
23 September 1981

Denmark	2-1	Norway
Elkjær 19'; Arnesen 68' (pen.)	Report	Tom Lund 62'

Idrætsparken, Copenhagen
Attendance: 16,200
Referee: Günther Linn (Germany)

=== 1982 ===
28 April 1982

Norway	1-1	Finland
Hallvar Thoresen 76'	Report	Nieminen 16'

Stavanger Stadion, Stavanger
Attendance: 5,700
Referee: Peer Frickmann (Denmark)
5 May 1982

Denmark	1-1	Sweden
Arnesen 82'		Larsson 68'

Idrætsparken, Copenhagen
Attendance: 15,300
Referee: Rolf Nyhuus (Norway)
15 June 1982

Norway	2-1	Denmark
Hareide 20'; Albertsen 23'		Laudrup 26'

Ullevaal, Oslo
Attendance: 16,200
Referee: David Richardson (England)
11 August 1982

Denmark	3-2	Finland
Bastrup 4'; Lerby 66'; Busk 72'		Valvee 8'; Turunen 37'

Idrætsparken, Copenhagen
Attendance: 5,700
Referee: Rolf Eriksson (Sweden)
11 August 1982

Norway	1-0	Sweden
Tom Lund 55'	Report

Ullevaal stadion, Oslo
Attendance: 22,403
Referee: Ole Amundsen (Denmark)

=== 1983 ===
7 September 1983

Finland	0-3	Sweden
	Report	Eriksson 1', 23'; Sunesson 3'

Olympic Stadium, Helsinki
Attendance: 8,513
Referee: Erik Steen Jensen (Denmark)

=== 1985 ===
22 May 1985

Sweden	1-0	Norway
Prytz 86' (pen.)	Report

Nya Ullevi, Gothenburg
Attendance: 12,123
Referee: Henning Lund-Sørensen (Denmark)

== Table ==
	Team	Pld	W	D	L	GF	GA	GD	Pts
1	Denmark	6	4	1	1	11	8	+3	9
2	Sweden	6	3	1	2	7	4	+3	7
3	Norway	6	2	1	3	6	8	–2	5
4	Finland	6	1	1	4	7	11	–4	3

== Winners ==
1981–85 Nordic Football Championship winners

Denmark
Second title

== Statistics ==
=== Goalscorers ===
There were 31 goals scored in 12 matches, for an average of 2.58 goals per match.

2 goals

- (Denmark) Frank Arnesen
- (Denmark) Lars Bastrup
- (Denmark) Preben Elkjær
- (Finland) Hannu Turunen
- (Finland) Ari Valvee
- (Norway) Tom Lund
- (Sweden) Ulf Eriksson

1 goal

- (Denmark) Søren Busk
- (Denmark) Henrik Eigenbrod
- (Denmark) Michael Laudrup
- (Denmark) John Lauridsen
- (Denmark) Søren Lerby
- (Finland) Keijo Kousa
- (Finland) Jyrki Nieminen
- (Finland) Hannu Rajaniemi
- (Norway) Roger Albertsen
- (Norway) Vidar Davidsen
- (Norway) Åge Hareide
- (Norway) Hallvar Thoresen
- (Sweden) Kalle Björklund
- (Sweden) Bo Börjesson
- (Sweden) Thomas Larsson
- (Sweden) Robert Prytz
- (Sweden) Thomas Sunesson

== See also ==
- Balkan Cup
- Baltic Cup
- Central European International Cup
- Mediterranean Cup
