= UEFA Euro 1984 qualifying Group 5 =

Football tournament qualification stage

Standings and results for Group 5 of the UEFA Euro 1984 qualifying tournament.

Group 5 consisted of Cyprus, Czechoslovakia, reigning World Champions Italy, Romania and Sweden. Group winners were Romania, who finished a point clear of second-placed Sweden.

== Final table ==
Pos	Team	Pld	W	D	L	GF	GA	GD	Pts	Qualification	(Romania)	(Sweden)	(Czechoslovakia)	(Italy)	(Cyprus)
1	Romania	8	5	2	1	9	3	+6	12	Qualify for final tournament	—	2–0	0–1	1–0	3–1
2	Sweden	8	5	1	2	14	5	+9	11		0–1	—	1–0	2–0	5–0
3	Czechoslovakia	8	3	4	1	15	7	+8	10		1–1	2–2	—	2–0	6–0
4	Italy	8	1	3	4	6	12	−6	5		0–0	0–3	2–2	—	3–1
5	Cyprus	8	0	2	6	4	21	−17	2		0–1	0–1	1–1	1–1	—

Source: UEFA
Rules for classification: Qualification tiebreakers

== Results ==
1 May 1982

Romania	3–1	Cyprus
Văetuș 16'; Cămătaru 18'; Bölöni 71'	(Details)	Vrahimis 29'

Stadionul Corvinul, Hunedoara
Attendance: 9,103
Referee: Arsen Hoxha (Albania)

8 September 1982

Romania	2–0	Sweden
Andone 25'; Klein 48'	(Details)

23 August Stadium, Bucharest
Attendance: 24,031
Referee: Edvard Šoštarič (Yugoslavia)

6 October 1982

Czechoslovakia	2–2	Sweden
Janečka 48', 53'	(Details)	Jingblad 87'; Eriksson 90'

Tehelné pole, Bratislava
Attendance: 14,977
Referee: Robert Valentine (Scotland)

13 November 1982

Italy	2–2	Czechoslovakia
Altobelli 13'; Kapko 65' (o.g.)	(Details)	Sloup 26'; Chaloupka 70'

San Siro, Milan
Attendance: 72,386
Referee: Charles Corver (Netherlands)

13 November 1982

Cyprus	0–1	Sweden
	(Details)	Corneliusson 34'

Makario Stadium, Nicosia
Attendance: 6,155
Referee: Neil Midgley (England)

4 December 1982

Italy	0–0	Romania
	(Details)

Stadio Comunale, Florence
Attendance: 50,478
Referee: Georges Konrath (France)

12 February 1983

Cyprus	1–1	Italy
Mavris 47'	(Details)	Patikkis 58' (o.g.)

Tsirio Stadium, Limassol
Attendance: 18,583
Referee: Bogdan Dochev (Bulgaria)

27 March 1983

Cyprus	1–1	Czechoslovakia
Theophanous 21'	(Details)	Bičovský 60'

Makario Stadium, Nicosia
Attendance: 6,951
Referee: Stjepan Glavina (Yugoslavia)

16 April 1983

Czechoslovakia	6–0	Cyprus
Daněk 4', 70'; Vízek 29', 48'; Prokeš 37'; Jurkemik 57'	(Details)

Stadion Evžena Rošického, Prague
Attendance: 8,180
Referee: Norbert Rolles (Luxembourg)

16 April 1983

Romania	1–0	Italy
Bölöni 24'	(Details)

23 August Stadium, Bucharest
Attendance: 62,966
Referee: Michel Vautrot (France)

15 May 1983

Sweden	5–0	Cyprus
Prytz 54', 77'; Corneliusson 58'; Hysén 62'; A.Ravelli 73'	(Details)

Malmö Stadion, Malmö
Attendance: 19,801
Referee: Juhani Smolander (Finland)

15 May 1983

Romania	0–1	Czechoslovakia
	(Details)	Vízek 40' (pen.)

23 August Stadium, Bucharest
Attendance: 30,108
Referee: Alexis Ponnet (Belgium)

29 May 1983

Sweden	2–0	Italy
Sandberg 31'; Strömberg 55'	(Details)

Nya Ullevi, Gothenburg
Attendance: 32,860
Referee: Walter Eschweiler (West Germany)

9 June 1983

Sweden	0–1	Romania
	(Details)	Cămătaru 30'

Råsunda Stadium, Solna
Attendance: 31,474
Referee: Adolf Prokop (East Germany)

21 September 1983

Sweden	1–0	Czechoslovakia
Corneliusson 17'	(Details)

Råsunda Stadium, Solna
Attendance: 20,546
Referee: Michel Vautrot (France)

15 October 1983

Italy	0–3	Sweden
	(Details)	Strömberg 20', 27'; Sunesson 71'

Stadio San Paolo, Naples
Attendance: 73,438
Referee: José García Carrión (Spain)

12 November 1983

Cyprus	0–1	Romania
	(Details)	Bölöni 78'

Tsirio Stadium, Limassol
Attendance: 5,277
Referee: Ronald Bridges (Wales)

16 November 1983

Czechoslovakia	2–0	Italy
Rada 63', 76' (pen.)	(Details)

Stadion Evžena Rošického, Prague
Attendance: 34,332
Referee: George Courtney (England)

30 November 1983

Czechoslovakia	1–1	Romania
Luhový 85'	(Details)	Geolgău 68'

Tehelné pole, Bratislava
Attendance: 45,554
Referee: Károly Palotai (Hungary)

22 December 1983

Italy	3–1	Cyprus
Altobelli 53'; Cabrini 82'; Rossi 86' (pen.)	(Details)	Tsingis 68' (pen.)

Stadio Renato Curi, Perugia
Attendance: 25,822
Referee: Thomas Oliver Donnelly (Northern Ireland)

== Goalscorers ==
There were 49 goals scored in 20 matches, for an average of 2.45 goals per match.

4 goals

- (Sweden) Dan Corneliusson

3 goals

- (Czechoslovakia) Ladislav Vízek
- (Romania) László Bölöni

2 goals

- (Czechoslovakia) Václav Daněk
- (Czechoslovakia) Petr Janečka
- (Czechoslovakia) Petr Rada
- (Italy) Alessandro Altobelli
- (Romania) Rodion Cămătaru
- (Sweden) Ulf Eriksson
- (Sweden) Robert Prytz
- (Sweden) Glenn Strömberg

1 goal

- (Cyprus) Takis Mavris
- (Cyprus) Fanis Theofanous
- (Cyprus) Marios Tsingis
- (Cyprus) Fivos Vrahimis
- (Czechoslovakia) Přemysl Bičovský
- (Czechoslovakia) Pavel Chaloupka
- (Czechoslovakia) Ladislav Jurkemik
- (Czechoslovakia) Milan Luhový
- (Czechoslovakia) Zdeněk Prokeš
- (Czechoslovakia) Jiří Sloup
- (Italy) Antonio Cabrini
- (Italy) Francesco Graziani
- (Italy) Paolo Rossi
- (Romania) Ioan Andone
- (Romania) Ion Geolgău
- (Romania) Michael Klein
- (Romania) Florea Văetuș
- (Sweden) Glenn Hysén
- (Sweden) Mats Jingblad
- (Sweden) Andreas Ravelli
- (Sweden) Håkan Sandberg
- (Sweden) Thomas Sunesson

1 own goal

- (Czechoslovakia) Ján Kapko (against Italy)
