= Bernt Ljung =

Swedish footballer

Personal information
- Full name: Bernt Åke Ljung
- Date of birth: 8 May 1958 (age 68)
- Place of birth: Borlänge, Sweden
- Position: Goalkeeper

Youth career
- 1968: Forsa BK
- 1969–1975: IK Brage

Senior career*
| Years | Team | Apps | (Gls) |
| 1976–1980 | IK Brage | | |
| 1981–1987 | AIK | 134 | (0) |
| 1988–1990 | Vasalunds IF | | |
| 1991–1992 | AIK | 19 | (0) |
| 1993 | IK Brage | | |

International career
| 1978–1981 | Sweden U21 | 7 | (0) |
| 1982–1984 | Sweden | 7 | (0) |
- * Club domestic league appearances and goals

Bernt Åke Ljung (born 8 May 1958) is a Swedish former professional footballer who played as a goalkeeper. He represented IK Brage, AIK, and Vasalunds IF during a career that spanned between 1976 and 1993. A full international between 1982 and 1984, he won seven caps for the Sweden national team.

== Club career ==
=== IK Brage ===
Ljung started his career as a 17-year-old in 1976 at IK Brage under manager Rolf Zetterlund, and helped the club advance from Division 3 to Allsvenskan in only four seasons in the late 1970s. During the 1980 Allsvenskan season, the team only conceded 18 goals as it finished fourth in the table as newcomers.

=== AIK ===
Ahead of the 1981 season, Ljung and Zetterlund both signed with fellow Allsvenskan club AIK. In early 1982, Ljung suffered a serious knee that would keep him out of the entire 1982 season. In 1983, Ljung played in 21 league games as AIK finished first in Allsvenskan, before being eliminated in the semifinals of the 1983 Allsvenskan play-offs by the eventual Swedish Champions IFK Göteborg. Ljung saved three penalty kicks in the penalty kick shootout in the 1985 Svenska Cupen final against Östers IF as AIK won the 1984–85 Svenska Cupen title.

=== Vasalunds IF, return to AIK ===
Ljung had a short stint at Vasalunds IF before returning to AIK again in 1991. In 1992, Ljung helped the team become Swedish Champions for the first time in 55 years.

=== Return to IK Brage and retirement ===
Ljung returned to his boyhood club IK Brage ahead of the 1993 Allsvenskan season and played for one year before announcing his retirement from professional football.

== International career ==
Ljung represented the Sweden U21 team a total of seven times between 1978 and 1981. He made his full international debut for the Sweden national team on 21 February 1982 in a friendly 1–2 loss against Finland. He played his first and only competitive game for Sweden on 12 September 1984 in a 1986 FIFA World Cup qualifier against Portugal, which Sweden lost 0–1. He won his seventh and last cap on 26 September 1984 in a friendly 0–1 loss to Italy.

== Career statistics ==
=== International ===
Appearances and goals by national team and year
| National team | Year | Apps | Goals |
|---|---|---|---|
| Sweden | 1982 | 1 | 0 |
| Sweden | 1983 | 3 | 0 |
| Sweden | 1984 | 3 | 0 |
| Total | | 7 | 0 |

== Honours ==
AIK

- Swedish Champion: 1992
- Allsvenskan: 1983
- Svenska Cupen: 1984–85
