= 1983 Allsvenskan =

59th season of Allsvenskan

Allsvenskan
- Season: 1983
- Champions: IFK Göteborg (Swedish champions after play-offs)
- Relegated: Mjällby AIF; BK Häcken
- European Cup: IFK Göteborg
- UEFA Cup: AIK; Östers IF
- Top goalscorer: Thomas Ahlström, IF Elfsborg (16)
- Average attendance: 6,528

Statistics of Allsvenskan in season 1983.

== Overview ==
The league was contested by 12 teams, with AIK winning the league and IFK Göteborg winning the Swedish championship after the play-offs.

== League table ==
Pos	Team	Pld	W	D	L	GF	GA	GD	Pts	Qualification or relegation
1	AIK (C)	22	13	6	3	37	12	+25	32	Allsvenskan play-offs, Qualification to UEFA Cup first round
2	Malmö FF	22	12	5	5	46	30	+16	29	Allsvenskan play-offs, Qualification to Cup Winners' Cup first round (Note: Malmö FF qualified for the European Cup Winners' Cup as Svenska Cupen champions 1983–84.)
3	IFK Göteborg (S)	22	11	5	6	35	19	+16	27	Allsvenskan play-offs, Qualification to European Cup first round
4	Östers IF	22	10	7	5	32	18	+14	27	Allsvenskan play-offs, Qualification to UEFA Cup first round
5	Hammarby IF	22	10	5	7	41	32	+9	25	Allsvenskan play-offs
6	Halmstads BK	22	10	5	7	32	34	−2	25	Allsvenskan play-offs
7	IF Elfsborg	22	7	9	6	31	31	0	23	Allsvenskan play-offs
8	Örgryte IS	22	6	10	6	34	26	+8	22	Allsvenskan play-offs
9	IK Brage	22	5	6	11	21	40	−19	16	
10	Gefle IF	22	4	5	13	21	37	−16	13	
11	Mjällby AIF (R)	22	3	7	12	18	44	−26	13	Relegation to Division 2
12	BK Häcken (R)	22	2	8	12	16	41	−25	12	Relegation to Division 2

Rules for classification: 1) points; 2) goal difference; 3) number of goals scored.
(C) Allsvenskan Champion; (S) Swedish Champion; (R) Relegated

== Results ==
Home \ Away	AIK	BKH	GIF	HBK	HIF	IFE	IFK	IKB	MFF	MAIF	ÖIS	ÖIF
AIK		1–0	5–0	2–0	2–2	1–1	1–0	3–0	2–0	4–1	0–0	1–0
BK Häcken	0–2		0–0	0–2	1–1	0–0	0–1	2–0	1–6	3–0	0–0	0–2
Gefle IF	3–0	1–1		1–4	1–0	0–1	3–0	1–2	3–5	3–0	1–1	0–1
Halmstads BK	0–0	3–2	2–0		2–1	3–3	0–2	1–1	0–2	2–0	1–0	3–2
Hammarby IF	1–2	2–2	1–0	2–1		2–2	3–0	6–2	2–1	2–1	4–1	0–0
IF Elfsborg	0–0	2–2	2–0	0–1	4–2		1–1	4–1	1–3	2–0	0–4	1–1
IFK Göteborg	3–2	5–0	0–0	4–1	3–0	0–0		2–1	6–1	0–0	2–0	0–1
IK Brage	0–0	3–2	2–1	2–2	1–2	1–3	1–0		0–2	0–0	0–0	0–2
Malmö FF	0–2	2–0	5–1	3–0	3–2	3–1	3–2	3–0		1–1	1–4	0–0
Mjällby AIF	0–6	1–0	2–1	2–2	1–0	1–2	0–0	0–1	1–1		3–3	2–4
Örgryte IS	1–0	7–0	0–0	0–2	1–3	3–1	1–3	1–1	1–1	4–1		2–2
Östers IF	0–1	0–0	3–1	5–0	1–3	2–0	0–1	3–2	0–0	3–1	0–0	

Legend: Blue = home team win; Yellow = draw; Red = away team win.

== Allsvenskan play-offs ==
The 1983 Allsvenskan play-offs was the second edition of the competition. The eight best placed teams from Allsvenskan qualified to the competition. IFK Göteborg who finished third in the league won the competition and the Swedish championship after defeating Öster who finished fourth in the league.

=== Quarter-finals ===
==== First leg ====
5 October 1983	Hammarby	2–5	AIK	Söderstadion, Stockholm

5 October 1983	Halmstad	1–2	Malmö FF	Örjans Vall, Halmstad

5 October 1983	Elfsborg	1–2	IFK Göteborg	Ryavallen, Borås

5 October 1983	Örgryte	0–1	Öster	Ullevi, Gothenburg

==== Second leg ====
9 October 1983	AIK	1–1 (6–3 agg.)	Hammarby	Råsunda, Solna

9 October 1983	Malmö FF	6–0 (8–1 agg.)	Halmstad	Malmö Stadion, Malmö

9 October 1983	IFK Göteborg	4–2 (6–3 agg.)	Elfsborg	Ullevi, Gothenburg

9 October 1983	Öster	4–0 (5–0 agg.)	Örgryte	Värendsvallen, Växjö

=== Semi-finals ===
==== First leg ====
23 October 1983	IFK Göteborg	3–0	AIK	Ullevi, Gothenburg

23 October 1983	Öster	1–0	Malmö FF	Värendsvallen, Växjö

==== Second leg ====
26 October 1983	AIK	2–0 (2–3 agg.)	IFK Göteborg	Råsunda, Solna

26 October 1983	Malmö FF	1–1 (1–2 agg.)	Öster	Malmö Stadion, Malmö

=== Final ===
30 October 1983	Öster	1–1	IFK Göteborg	Värendsvallen, Växjö

5 November 1983	IFK Göteborg	3–0 (4–1 agg.)	Öster	Ullevi, Gothenburg

== Season statistics ==
=== Top scorers ===
Rank	Player	Club	Goals
1	(Sweden) Thomas Ahlström	IF Elfsborg	15
2	(Sweden) Sören Börjesson	Örgryte IS	12
2	(Sweden) Mats Jingblad	Halmstads BK	12
4	(Sweden) Jan Mattsson	Östers IF	11
5	(Sweden) Peter Gerhardsson	Hammarby IF	10
6	(Sweden) Dan Corneliusson	IFK Göteborg	9
6	(Sweden) Thomas Johansson	AIK	9
8	(Sweden) Thomas Sunesson	Malmö FF	8
8	(Sweden) Björn Nilsson	Malmö FF	8
8	(Sweden) Glenn Martindahl	Örgryte IS	8
8	(Sweden) Mikael Rönnberg	Malmö FF	8

== Attendances ==
#	Club	Average	Highest
1	Hammarby IF	9,912	26,072
2	Malmö FF	9,596	22,015
3	IFK Göteborg	9,345	15,123
4	AIK	6,665	17,001
5	Örgryte IS	5,782	24,358
6	Halmstads BK	5,590	6,822
7	Gefle IF	5,093	7,644
8	IF Elfsborg	5,014	11,666
9	IK Brage	4,613	6,736
10	Mjällby AIF	4,029	7,109
11	Östers IF	3,952	8,515
12	BK Häcken	3,193	6,878
