= 1983 in Swedish football =

The 1983 season in Swedish football, starting January 1983 and ending December 1983:

== Honours ==
=== Official titles ===
Title	Team	Reason
Swedish Champions 1983	IFK Göteborg	Winners of Allsvenskan play-off
Swedish Cup Champions 1982–83	IFK Göteborg	Winners of Svenska Cupen

=== Competitions ===
Level	Competition	Team
1st level	Allsvenskan 1983	AIK
1st level	Allsvenskan play-off 1983	IFK Göteborg
2nd level	Division 2 Norra 1983	IFK Norrköping
2nd level	Division 2 Södra 1983	Kalmar FF
Cup	Svenska Cupen 1982–83	IFK Göteborg

== Promotions, relegations and qualifications ==
=== Promotions ===
Promoted from	Promoted to	Team	Reason
Division 2 Norra 1983	Allsvenskan 1984	IFK Norrköping	Winners of promotion play-off
Division 2 Södra 1983	Allsvenskan 1984	Kalmar FF	Winners of promotion play-off
Division 3 1983	Division 2 Norra 1984	Degerfors IF	Winners of promotion play-off
Division 3 1983	Division 2 Norra 1984	Nyköpings BIS	Winners of promotion play-off
Division 3 1983	Division 2 Norra 1984	Skellefteå AIK	Winners of promotion play-off
Division 3 1983	Division 2 Södra 1984	GAIS	Winners of promotion play-off
Division 3 1983	Division 2 Södra 1984	Lunds BK	Winners of promotion play-off
Division 3 1983	Division 2 Södra 1984	Norrby IF	Winners of promotion play-off

=== League transfers ===
Transferred from	Transferred to	Team	Reason
Division 2 Södra 1983	Division 2 Norra 1984	Åtvidabergs FF	Geographic composition

=== Relegations ===
Relegated from	Relegated to	Team	Reason
Allsvenskan 1983	Division 2 Södra 1984	Mjällby AIF	11th team
Allsvenskan 1983	Division 2 Södra 1984	BK Häcken	12th team
Division 2 Norra 1983	Division 3 1984	Ope IF	12th team
Division 2 Södra 1983	Division 3 1984	Karlskrona AIF	12th team

=== International qualifications ===
Qualified for	Enters	Team	Reason
European Cup 1984–85	1st round	IFK Göteborg	Winners of Allsvenskan play-off
UEFA Cup 1984–85	1st round	AIK	Winners of Allsvenskan
UEFA Cup 1984–85	1st round	Östers IF	4th team in Allsvenskan
UEFA Cup Winners' Cup 1983–84	1st round	Hammarby IF	Runners-up of Svenska Cupen
International Football Cup 1984	Group stage	AIK	Winners of Allsvenskan
International Football Cup 1984	Group stage	Malmö FF	2nd team in Allsvenskan
International Football Cup 1984	Group stage	IFK Göteborg	3rd team in Allsvenskan
International Football Cup 1984	Group stage	Östers IF	4th team in Allsvenskan

== Domestic results ==
=== Allsvenskan 1983 ===

	Team	Pld	W	D	L	GF		GA	GD	Pts
1	AIK	22	13	6	3	37	–	12	+25	32
2	Malmö FF	22	12	5	5	46	–	30	+16	29
3	IFK Göteborg	22	11	5	6	35	–	19	+16	27
4	Östers IF	22	10	7	5	32	–	18	+14	27
5	Hammarby IF	22	10	5	7	41	–	32	+9	25
6	Halmstads BK	22	10	5	7	32	–	34	-2	25
7	IF Elfsborg	22	7	9	6	31	–	31	0	23
8	Örgryte IS	22	6	10	6	34	–	26	+8	22
9	IK Brage	22	5	6	11	21	–	40	-19	16
10	Gefle IF	22	4	5	13	21	–	37	-16	13
11	Mjällby AIF	22	3	7	12	18	–	44	-26	13
12	BK Häcken	22	2	8	12	16	–	41	-25	12

=== Allsvenskan play-off 1983 ===
Quarter-finals

October 5, 1983

Hammarby IF	2–5	AIK

?, ?
October 9, 1983

AIK	1–1	Hammarby IF

?, ?

October 5, 1983

Halmstads BK	1–2	Malmö FF

?, ?
October 9, 1983

Malmö FF	6–0	Halmstads BK

?, ?

October 5, 1983

IF Elfsborg	1–2	IFK Göteborg

?, ?
October 9, 1983

IFK Göteborg	4–2	IF Elfsborg

?, ?

October 5, 1983

Örgryte IS	0–1	Östers IF

?, ?
October 9, 1983

Östers IF	4–0	Örgryte IS

?, ?

Semi-finals

October 23, 1983

IFK Göteborg	3–0	AIK

?, ?
October 26, 1983

AIK	2–0	IFK Göteborg

?, ?

October 23, 1983

Östers IF	1–0	Malmö FF

?, ?
October 26, 1983

Malmö FF	1–1	Östers IF

?, ?

Final

October 30, 1983

Östers IF	1–1	IFK Göteborg

Värendsvallen, Växjö
November 5, 1983

IFK Göteborg	3–0	Östers IF

Nya Ullevi, Gothenburg

=== Allsvenskan promotion play-off 1983 ===
October 8, 1983

IFK Malmö	0–1	IFK Norrköping

?, Malmö
October 16, 1983

IFK Norrköping	4–0	IFK Malmö

?, Norrköping

October 8, 1983

Djurgårdens IF	1–0	Kalmar FF

?, Stockholm
October 16, 1983

Kalmar FF	3–1	Djurgårdens IF

?, Kalmar

=== Division 2 Norra 1983 ===

	Team	Pld	W	D	L	GF		GA	GD	Pts
1	IFK Norrköping	22	16	3	3	68	–	14	+54	35
2	Djurgårdens IF	22	13	5	4	46	–	22	+24	31
3	Örebro SK	22	10	7	5	36	–	27	+9	27
4	IF Brommapojkarna	22	11	4	7	37	–	33	+4	24
5	Västerås SK	22	9	5	8	39	–	41	-2	23
6	Sandvikens IF	22	8	6	8	26	–	29	-3	22
7	IFK Sundsvall	22	8	5	9	30	–	29	+1	21
8	Vasalunds IF	22	6	7	9	27	–	38	-11	19
9	Karlslunds IF	22	4	8	10	26	–	37	-11	16
10	IFK Västerås	22	6	3	13	26	–	52	-26	15
11	IFK Eskilstuna	22	5	5	12	15	–	41	-26	15
12	Ope IF	22	4	6	12	23	–	36	-13	14

=== Division 2 Södra 1983 ===
	Team	Pld	W	D	L	GF		GA	GD	Pts
1	Kalmar FF	22	14	4	4	34	–	15	+19	32
2	IFK Malmö	22	13	2	7	41	–	24	+17	28
3	Landskrona BoIS	22	12	3	7	35	–	23	+12	27
4	Åtvidabergs FF	22	9	7	6	26	–	17	+9	25
5	IS Halmia	22	7	9	6	31	–	23	+8	23
6	Kalmar AIK	22	8	7	7	31	–	31	0	23
7	Trelleborgs FF	22	8	6	8	26	–	28	-2	22
8	Myresjö IF	22	7	7	8	25	–	27	-2	21
9	Grimsås IF	22	5	10	7	27	–	35	-8	20
10	Västra Frölunda IF	22	5	9	8	18	–	26	-8	19
11	Helsingborgs IF	22	6	5	11	22	–	32	-10	17
12	Karlskrona AIF	22	1	5	16	14	–	49	-35	7

=== Division 2 promotion play-off 1983 ===
October 8, 1983

Falu BS	2–3	Nyköpings BIS

?, ?
October 16, 1983

Nyköpings BIS	3–1	Falu BS

?, ?

October 8, 1983

Hovås IF	0–3	Skellefteå AIK

?, ?
October 16, 1983

Skellefteå AIK	1–0	Hovås IF

?, ?

October 8, 1983

Krokom/Dvärslätts IF	2–4	Degerfors IF

?, ?
October 16, 1983

Degerfors IF	0–1	Krokom/Dvärslätts IF

?, ?

October 8, 1983

Lunds BK	2–0	Ifö/Bromölla IF

?, ?
October 16, 1983

Ifö/Bromölla IF	2–2	Lunds BK

?, ?

October 8, 1983

Mönsterås GIF	0–6	GAIS

?, ?
October 16, 1983

GAIS	3–2	Mönsterås GIF

?, ?

October 8, 1983

Spånga IS	1–0	Norrby IF

?, ?
October 16, 1983

Norrby IF	1–0 3–1 (apen)	Spånga IS

?, ?

=== Svenska Cupen 1982–83 ===
Final

June 19, 1983

IFK Göteborg	0–0 1–0 (aet)	Hammarby IF

Råsunda, Solna

== National team results ==
April 27, 1983
Friendly
№ 593

Netherlands	0–3	Sweden
		Corneliusson 12', 68'; Prytz 25' (p)

Stadion Nieuw Galgenwaard, Utrecht
Attendance: 9,000
Referee: Roth (West Germany)

May 15, 1983
Euro 84 qualification
№ 594

Sweden	5–0	Cyprus
Prytz 53', 76'; Corneliusson 57'; Hysén 61'; Ravelli 72'

Malmö Stadion, Malmö
Attendance: 19,801
Referee: Smolander (Finland)

May 29, 1983
Euro 84 qualification
№ 595

Sweden	2–0	Italy
Sandberg 32'; Strömberg 56'

Nya Ullevi, Gothenburg
Attendance: 35,012
Referee: Eschweiler (West Germany)

June 9, 1983
Euro 84 qualification
№ 596

Sweden	0–1	Romania
		Cămătaru 29'

Råsunda, Solna
Attendance: 31,474
Referee: Prokop (East Germany)

June 22, 1983
Friendly
№ 597

Sweden	3–3	Brazil
Corneliusson 14', 18'; Hysén 33'		Márcio 8'; Careca 22'; Jorginho 76'

Nya Ullevi, Gothenburg
Attendance: 43,172
Referee: Sørensen (Denmark)

August 17, 1983
Friendly
№ 598

Iceland	0–4	Sweden
		Jingblad 4'; Ramberg 19'; Hysén 28'; Fredriksson 8' (p)

Laugardalsvöllur, Reykjavík
Attendance: 4,500
Referee: Richardson (England)

September 7, 1983
Nordic Championship 1981–83
№ 599

Finland	0–3	Sweden
		Eriksson 1', 23'; Sunesson 3'

Olympiastadion, Helsinki
Attendance: 8,513
Referee: Jensen (Denmark)

September 21, 1983
Euro 84 qualification
№ 600

Sweden	1–0	Czechoslovakia
Corneliusson 13'

Råsunda, Solna
Attendance: 22,066
Referee: Vautrot (France)

October 15, 1983
Euro 84 qualification
№ 601

Italy	0–3	Sweden
		Strömberg 20', 27'; Sunesson 71'

Stadio San Paolo, Naples
Attendance: 80,086
Referee: Carrion (Spain)

November 16, 1983
Friendly
№ 602

Trinidad and Tobago	0–5	Sweden
		Dahlkvist 14'; Jingblad 48', 54', 88'; Sunesson 77'

?, Port of Spain
Attendance: 7,000
Referee: Dyer (Trinidad and Tobago)

November 19, 1983
Friendly
№ 603

Barbados	0–4	Sweden
		Dahlkvist 23'; Jingblad 75', 80', 85'

?, Bridgetown
Attendance: 4,000
Referee: Hoyte (Barbados)

November 22, 1983
Friendly
№ 604

Mexico	2–0	Sweden
Beltrán 84'; Cháves 90'

?, Morelia
Attendance: 22,000
Referee: Leanza (Mexico)
