= 1936–37 Division 2 (Swedish football) =

Swedish League Division 2
- Season: 1936–37
- Champions: IK Brage; Hammarby IF; Degerfors IF
- Promoted: IK Brage; Hälsingborgs IF
- Relegated: IF Rune; Fagersta AIK; Husqvarna IF; Årsta SK; IFK Örebro; IFK Kristinehamn; Ängelholms IF; Växjö BK

Statistics of Swedish football Division 2 for the 1936–37 season.

== League standings ==
=== Division 2 Norra 1936–37 ===
Teams from a large part of northern Sweden, approximately above the province of Medelpad, were not allowed to play in the national league system until the 1953–54 season, and a championship was instead played to decide the best team in Norrland.

| Pos | Team | Pld | W | D | L | GF | GA | GD | Pts | Qualification or relegation |
|---|---|---|---|---|---|---|---|---|---|---|
| 1 | IK Brage | 18 | 16 | 1 | 1 | 70 | 21 | +49 | 33 | Playoffs for promotion to Allsvenskan |
| 2 | Ljusne AIK | 18 | 8 | 5 | 5 | 25 | 20 | +5 | 21 (Note: Tie breaker is goal average.) | |
| 3 | Gefle IF | 18 | 8 | 5 | 5 | 35 | 31 | +4 | 21 | |
| 4 | IFK Västerås | 18 | 7 | 6 | 5 | 41 | 36 | +5 | 20 | League transfer within league level |
| 5 | Hallstahammars SK | 18 | 8 | 3 | 7 | 42 | 29 | +13 | 19 | League transfer within league level |
| 6 | IFK Grängesberg | 18 | 7 | 4 | 7 | 39 | 37 | +2 | 18 | |
| 7 | Surahammars IF | 18 | 6 | 6 | 6 | 35 | 34 | +1 | 18 | League transfer within league level |
| 8 | Bollnäs GIF | 18 | 5 | 7 | 6 | 25 | 28 | −3 | 17 | |
| 9 | IF Rune | 18 | 2 | 3 | 13 | 26 | 62 | −36 | 7 | Relegated to Division 3 |
| 10 | Fagersta AIK | 18 | 2 | 2 | 14 | 22 | 65 | −43 | 6 | Relegated to Division 3 |

=== Division 2 Östra 1936–37 ===
| Pos | Team | Pld | W | D | L | GF | GA | GD | Pts | Qualification or relegation |
|---|---|---|---|---|---|---|---|---|---|---|
| 1 | Hammarby IF | 18 | 9 | 7 | 2 | 33 | 21 | +12 | 25 | Playoffs for promotion to Allsvenskan |
| 2 | IK Tord | 18 | 8 | 5 | 5 | 42 | 33 | +9 | 21 | League transfer within league level |
| 3 | BK Derby | 18 | 7 | 6 | 5 | 37 | 23 | +14 | 20 (Note: Tie breaker is goal average.) | |
| 4 | Skärblacka IF | 18 | 8 | 4 | 6 | 36 | 31 | +5 | 20 | |
| 5 | Reymersholms IK | 18 | 9 | 2 | 7 | 39 | 35 | +4 | 20 | League transfer within league level |
| 6 | IFK Eskilstuna | 18 | 7 | 3 | 8 | 46 | 33 | +13 | 17 | |
| 7 | Värtans IK | 18 | 6 | 5 | 7 | 20 | 24 | −4 | 17 | League transfer within league level |
| 8 | Mjölby AI | 18 | 6 | 4 | 8 | 32 | 40 | −8 | 16 | |
| 9 | Husqvarna IF | 18 | 4 | 5 | 9 | 25 | 42 | −17 | 13 | Relegated to Division 3 |
| 10 | Årsta SK | 18 | 3 | 5 | 10 | 21 | 49 | −28 | 11 | Relegated to Division 3 |

=== Division 2 Västra 1936–37 ===
| Pos | Team | Pld | W | D | L | GF | GA | GD | Pts | Qualification or relegation |
|---|---|---|---|---|---|---|---|---|---|---|
| 1 | Degerfors IF | 18 | 14 | 2 | 2 | 62 | 29 | +33 | 30 | Playoffs for promotion to Allsvenskan |
| 2 | Karlskoga IF | 18 | 12 | 2 | 4 | 46 | 20 | +26 | 26 | |
| 3 | Alingsås IF | 18 | 7 | 5 | 6 | 37 | 28 | +9 | 19 | |
| 4 | Billingsfors IK | 18 | 8 | 2 | 8 | 35 | 30 | +5 | 18 | |
| 5 | Tidaholms GIF | 18 | 6 | 5 | 7 | 27 | 32 | −5 | 17 (Note: Tie breaker is goal average.) | |
| 6 | Jonsereds IF | 18 | 5 | 7 | 6 | 27 | 34 | −7 | 17 | |
| 7 | Karlstads BK | 18 | 6 | 3 | 9 | 26 | 34 | −8 | 15 | |
| 8 | Fässbergs IF | 18 | 6 | 2 | 10 | 29 | 39 | −10 | 14 | |
| 9 | IFK Örebro | 18 | 5 | 2 | 11 | 25 | 47 | −22 | 12 | Relegated to Division 3 |
| 10 | IFK Kristinehamn | 18 | 5 | 2 | 11 | 20 | 41 | −21 | 12 | Relegated to Division 3 |

=== Division 2 Södra 1936–37 ===
| Pos | Team | Pld | W | D | L | GF | GA | GD | Pts | Qualification or relegation |
|---|---|---|---|---|---|---|---|---|---|---|
| 1 | Helsingborgs IF | 18 | 12 | 4 | 2 | 52 | 16 | +36 | 28 | Playoffs for promotion to Allsvenskan |
| 2 | Halmstads BK | 18 | 11 | 4 | 3 | 46 | 14 | +32 | 26 | |
| 3 | Höganäs BK | 18 | 10 | 4 | 4 | 40 | 29 | +11 | 24 | |
| 4 | Malmö BI | 18 | 9 | 3 | 6 | 40 | 32 | +8 | 21 | |
| 5 | BK Landora | 18 | 7 | 4 | 7 | 30 | 29 | +1 | 18 (Note: Tie breaker is goal average.) | |
| 6 | IFK Kristianstad | 18 | 8 | 2 | 8 | 48 | 48 | 0 | 18 | |
| 7 | IFK Helsingborg | 18 | 7 | 2 | 9 | 35 | 35 | 0 | 16 | |
| 8 | IS Halmia | 18 | 6 | 2 | 10 | 27 | 36 | −9 | 14 | |
| 9 | Ängelholms IF | 18 | 5 | 3 | 10 | 27 | 52 | −25 | 13 | Relegated to Division 3 |
| 10 | Växjö BK | 18 | 1 | 0 | 17 | 16 | 70 | −54 | 2 | Relegated to Division 3 |
