= Björn Johansson =

Björn Johansson may refer to:

- Björn Johansson (ice hockey) (born 1956), Swedish ice hockey defenceman
- Björn Ola Marcus Johansson (born 1979), Swedish ice hockey defenceman
- Björn Johansson (cyclist) (born 1963), Swedish cyclist
- Bjorn Johansson Associates, employer of Aurelia Frick

== See also ==
- Bjorn Johansen (disambiguation)
