= 1984 in Swedish football =

The 1984 season in Swedish football, starting January 1984 and ending December 1984:

== Honours ==
=== Official titles ===
Title	Team	Reason
Swedish Champions 1984	IFK Göteborg	Winners of Allsvenskan play-off
Swedish Cup Champions 1983–84	Malmö FF	Winners of Svenska Cupen

=== Competitions ===
Level	Competition	Team
1st level	Allsvenskan 1984	IFK Göteborg
1st level	Allsvenskan play-off 1984	IFK Göteborg
2nd level	Division 2 Norra 1984	Örebro SK
2nd level	Division 2 Södra 1984	Trelleborgs FF
Cup	Svenska Cupen 1983–84	Malmö FF

== Promotions, relegations and qualifications ==
=== Promotions ===
Promoted from	Promoted to	Team	Reason
Division 2 Södra 1984	Allsvenskan 1985	Mjällby AIF	Winners of promotion play-off
Division 2 Södra 1984	Allsvenskan 1985	Trelleborgs FF	Winners of promotion play-off
Division 3 1984	Division 2 Norra 1985	Falu BS	Winners of promotion play-off
Division 3 1984	Division 2 Norra 1985	Luleå FF	Winners of promotion play-off
Division 3 1984	Division 2 Norra 1985	Ope IF	Winners of promotion play-off
Division 3 1984	Division 2 Norra 1985	Tyresö FF	Winners of promotion play-off
Division 3 1984	Division 2 Södra 1985	Jönköpings Södra IF	Winners of promotion play-off
Division 3 1984	Division 2 Södra 1985	Markaryds IF	Winners of promotion play-off

=== League transfers ===
Transferred from	Transferred to	Team	Reason
Division 2 Norra 1984	Division 2 Södra 1985	Degerfors IF	Geographical composition
Division 2 Norra 1984	Division 2 Södra 1985	Åtvidabergs FF	Geographical composition

=== Relegations ===
Relegated from	Relegated to	Team	Reason
Allsvenskan 1984	Division 2 Norra 1985	Gefle IF	12th team
Allsvenskan 1984	Division 2 Södra 1985	IF Elfsborg	11th team
Division 2 Norra 1984	Division 3 1985	IFK Sundsvall	12th team
Division 2 Norra 1984	Division 3 1985	Skellefteå AIK	13th team
Division 2 Norra 1984	Division 3 1985	Nyköpings BIS	14th team
Division 2 Södra 1984	Division 3 1985	Landskrona BoIS	12th team
Division 2 Södra 1984	Division 3 1985	Lunds BK	13th team
Division 2 Södra 1984	Division 3 1985	Grimsås IF	14th team

=== International qualifications ===
Qualified for	Enters	Team	Reason
European Cup 1985–86	1st round	IFK Göteborg	Winners of Allsvenskan play-off
UEFA Cup 1985–86	1st round	Malmö FF	3rd team in Allsvenskan
UEFA Cup 1985–86	1st round	Hammarby IF	4th team in Allsvenskan
UEFA Cup Winners' Cup 1984–85	1st round	Malmö FF	Winners of Svenska Cupen
International Football Cup 1985	Group stage	IFK Göteborg	Winners of Allsvenskan
International Football Cup 1985	Group stage	AIK	2nd team in Allsvenskan
International Football Cup 1985	Group stage	Malmö FF	3rd team in Allsvenskan
International Football Cup 1985	Group stage	Hammarby IF	4th team in Allsvenskan

== Domestic results ==
=== Allsvenskan 1984 ===

	Team	Pld	W	D	L	GF		GA	GD	Pts
1	IFK Göteborg	22	14	4	4	43	–	19	+24	32
2	AIK	22	12	7	3	28	–	12	+16	31
3	Malmö FF	22	11	5	6	47	–	24	+23	27
4	Hammarby IF	22	11	4	7	42	–	30	+12	26
5	IFK Norrköping	22	8	8	6	33	–	30	+3	24
6	IK Brage	22	7	6	9	21	–	25	-4	20
7	Kalmar FF	22	5	10	7	17	–	25	-8	20
8	Halmstads BK	22	7	5	10	18	–	26	-8	19
9	Örgryte IS	22	5	7	10	24	–	36	-12	17
10	Östers IF	22	5	6	11	28	–	36	-8	16
11	IF Elfsborg	22	5	6	11	24	–	39	-15	16
12	Gefle IF	22	4	8	10	21	–	44	-23	16

=== Allsvenskan play-off 1984 ===
Quarter-finals

October 7, 1984

Halmstads BK	0–0	IFK Göteborg

?, ?
October 10, 1984

IFK Göteborg	2–1	Halmstads BK

?, ?

October 7, 1984

IFK Norrköping	1–0	AIK

?, ?
October 10, 1984

AIK	2–1 (ag)	IFK Norrköping

?, ?

October 7, 1984

IK Brage	1–0	Malmö FF

?, ?
October 10, 1984

Malmö FF	2–2	IK Brage

?, ?

October 7, 1984

Kalmar FF	3–2	Hammarby IF

?, ?
October 10, 1984

Hammarby IF	3–0	Kalmar FF

?, ?

Semi-finals

October 21, 1984

IK Brage	1–5	IFK Göteborg

?, ?
October 28, 1984

IFK Göteborg	2–2	IK Brage

?, ?

October 21, 1984

IFK Norrköping	0–0	Hammarby IF

?, ?
October 28, 1984

Hammarby IF	0–0 4–5 (apen)	IFK Norrköping

?, ?

Final

October 31, 1984

IFK Norrköping	1–5	IFK Göteborg

Idrottsparken, Norrköping
November 3, 1984

IFK Göteborg	2–0	IFK Norrköping

Nya Ullevi, Gothenburg

=== Allsvenskan promotion play-off 1984 ===
October 21, 1984

Mjällby AIF	1–0	Örebro SK

?, Hällevik
October 28, 1984

Örebro SK	0–3	Mjällby AIF

?, Örebro

October 21, 1984

Åtvidabergs FF	1–0	Trelleborgs FF

?, Åtvidaberg
October 28, 1984

Trelleborgs FF	3–1	Åtvidabergs FF

?, Trelleborg

=== Division 2 Norra 1984 ===

	Team	Pld	W	D	L	GF		GA	GD	Pts
1	Örebro SK	26	14	8	4	47	–	17	+30	36
2	Åtvidabergs FF	26	12	12	2	35	–	14	+21	36
3	Djurgårdens IF	26	12	11	3	28	–	13	+15	35
4	IF Brommapojkarna	26	14	6	6	36	–	15	+21	34
5	IFK Västerås	26	8	10	8	29	–	30	-1	26
6	Västerås SK	26	8	8	10	33	–	30	+3	24
7	Vasalunds IF	26	9	6	11	27	–	28	-1	24
8	Karlslunds IF	26	7	10	9	23	–	33	-10	24
9	IFK Eskilstuna	26	5	13	8	25	–	39	-14	23
10	Degerfors IF	26	7	8	11	33	–	37	-4	22
11	Sandvikens IF	26	6	10	10	26	–	31	-5	22
12	IFK Sundsvall	26	8	6	12	25	–	31	-6	22
13	Skellefteå AIK	26	6	9	11	22	–	33	-11	21
14	Nyköpings BIS	26	2	11	13	14	–	52	-38	15

=== Division 2 Södra 1984 ===
	Team	Pld	W	D	L	GF		GA	GD	Pts
1	Trelleborgs FF	26	20	1	5	61	–	26	+35	41
2	Mjällby AIF	26	14	5	7	55	–	33	+22	33
3	GAIS	26	11	9	6	41	–	29	+12	31
4	Helsingborgs IF	26	13	4	9	49	–	36	+13	30
5	BK Häcken	26	10	9	7	44	–	38	+6	29
6	Kalmar AIK	26	8	10	8	38	–	35	+3	26
7	Norrby IF	26	9	7	10	47	–	37	+10	25
8	Västra Frölunda IF	26	9	7	10	29	–	31	-2	25
9	IFK Malmö	26	11	3	12	39	–	42	-3	25
10	IS Halmia	26	9	6	11	37	–	37	0	24
11	Myresjö IF	26	9	6	11	35	–	50	-15	24
12	Landskrona BoIS	26	6	8	12	32	–	38	-6	20
13	Lunds BK	26	7	6	13	40	–	57	-17	20
14	Grimsås IF	26	3	5	18	27	–	85	-58	11

=== Division 2 promotion play-off 1984 ===
October 13, 1984

Falu BS	2–0	Råsunda IS

?, ?
October 21, 1984

Råsunda IS	3–1 (ag)	Falu BS

?, ?

October 13, 1984

Linköpings FF	0–1	Markaryds IF

?, ?
October 20, 1984

Markaryds IF	2–0	Linköpings FF

?, ?

October 13, 1984

Karlstad BK	2–1	Ope IF

?, ?
October 20, 1984

Ope IF	2–1 3–1 (apen)	Karlstad BK

?, ?

October 13, 1984

Varbergs BoIS	2–2	Luleå FF/Gammelstad

?, ?
October 21, 1984

Luleå FF/Gammelstad	3–1	Varbergs BoIS

?, ?

October 13, 1984

Tyresö FF	4–1	IK Oddevold

?, ?
October 20, 1984

IK Oddevold	2–3	Tyresö FF

?, ?

October 13, 1984

Jönköpings Södra IF	6–0	Karlskrona AIF

?, ?
October 20, 1984

Karlskrona AIF	0–4	Jönköpings Södra IF

?, ?

=== Svenska Cupen 1983–84 ===
Final

June 20, 1984

Malmö FF	1–0	Landskrona BoIS

?, Helsingborg

== National team results ==
February 23, 1984
Friendly
№ 605

Sweden	4–0	United States
Dahlkvist 25'; Sunesson 70'; Sandberg 83', 88'

Tipshallen, Jönköping
Attendance: 3,800
Referee: Nielsen (Denmark)

May 2, 1984
Friendly
№ 606

Switzerland	0–0	Sweden

Wankdorf Stadion, Bern
Attendance: 8,500
Referee: Sharir (Israel)

May 23, 1984
1986 World Cup qualification
№ 607

Sweden	4–0	Malta
Sunesson 4', 76'; Corneliusson 36'; Erlandsson 70'

Idrottsparken, Norrköping
Attendance: 18,819
Referee: Syrne (Scotland)

June 6, 1984
Friendly
№ 608

Sweden	0–1	Denmark
		Elkjær 44'

Nya Ullevi, Gothenburg
Attendance: 24,388
Referee: Halle (Norway)

August 22, 1984
Friendly
№ 609

Sweden	1–1	Mexico
Prytz 54' (p)		Aguirre 52'

Malmö Stadion, Malmö
Attendance: 15,918
Referee: Scheurell (East Germany)

September 12, 1984
1986 World Cup qualification
№ 610

Sweden	0–1	Portugal
		Gomes 78'

Råsunda, Solna
Attendance: 30,136
Referee: Quiniou (France)

September 26, 1984
Friendly
№ 611

Italy	1–0	Sweden
Cabrini 2'

Stadio Giuseppe Meazza, Milan
Attendance: 25,000
Referee: Brummeier (Austria)

October 17, 1984
1986 World Cup qualification
№ 612

West Germany	2–0	Sweden
Rahn 75'; Rummenigge 88'

Müngersdorfer Stadion, Cologne
Attendance: 61,195
Referee: Valentine (Scotland)

November 14, 1984
1986 World Cup qualification
№ 613

Portugal	1–3	Sweden
Jordão 11'		Prytz 26' (p), 34'; Nilsson 37'

Estádio José Alvalade, Lisbon
Attendance: 34,111
Referee: Schoeters (Belgium)
