= Ulf Eriksson (footballer) =

Swedish footballer

Personal information
- Full name: Ulf Eriksson
- Date of birth: 21 February 1958 (age 68)
- Place of birth: Uppsala, Sweden
- Height: 1.83 m (6 ft 0 in)
- Position: Midfielder

Senior career*
Years	Team	Apps	(Gls)
1977	IF Vesta		
1978	Enköpings SK		
1979–1983	Hammarby IF	111	(38)
1983–1985	Aris Thessaloniki	50	(9)
1985–1989	Hammarby IF	65	(17)
1990–1991	Enköpings SK		
1992	Huddinge IF		

International career
1979–1988	Sweden	34	(3)
- * Club domestic league appearances and goals

Ulf Eriksson (born 21 February 1958) is a Swedish former professional footballer who played as a midfielder and made 34 appearances for the Sweden national team.

== Career ==
Eriksson made his debut for Sweden on 17 November 1979 in a friendly match against Singapore, which finished as a 5–0 win. He went on to make 34 appearances, scoring 3 goals, before making his last appearance on 15 January 1988 in the 1–0 win Maspalomas tournament win against Finland.

== Career statistics ==
=== International ===
Appearances and goals by national team and year

National team	Year	Apps	Goals
Sweden	1979	1	0
Sweden	1980	0	0
Sweden	1981	0	0
Sweden	1982	1	1
Sweden	1983	8	2
Sweden	1984	8	0
Sweden	1985	3	0
Sweden	1986	7	0
Sweden	1987	4	0
Sweden	1988	2	0
Total		34	3

International goals

No.	Date	Venue	Opponent	Score	Result	Competition
1	6 October 1982	Tehelné pole, Bratislava, Czechoslovakia	Czechoslovakia	2–2	2–2	UEFA Euro 1984 qualifying
2	7 September 1983	Olympic Stadium, Helsinki, Finland	Finland	1–0	3–0	1981–85 Nordic Football Championship
3	7 September 1983	Olympic Stadium, Helsinki, Finland	Finland	3–0	3–0	1981–85 Nordic Football Championship

== Honours ==
Individual

- Nordic Football Championship top scorer: 1981–85 (shared with Frank Arnesen, Lars Bastrup, Preben Elkjær, Hannu Turunen, Ari Valvee, and Tom Lund)
