= Zetterlund =

Zetterlund is a surname. Notable people with the surname include:

- Fabian Zetterlund (born 1999), Swedish ice hockey player
- Lars Zetterlund (born 1964), Swedish footballer
- Monica Zetterlund (1937–2005), Swedish singer and actress
- Rolf Zetterlund (born 1942), Swedish footballer and manager
- Yoko Zetterlund (born 1969), Japanese volleyball player
