= Teodor Wålemark =

Swedish footballer

Personal information
- Date of birth: 25 June 2001 (age 25)
- Place of birth: Limassol, Cyprus
- Height: 1.90 m (6 ft 3 in)
- Position: Centre-back

Team information
- Current team: IK Brage
- Number: 3

Youth career
- Ljungskile
- –2016: Västra Frölunda
- 2017–2019: Häcken

Senior career*
Years	Team	Apps	(Gls)
2016	Västra Frölunda	1	(0)
2019	Häcken	0	(0)
2020	Ljungskile	21	(0)
2021–2022	Lindome	55	(1)
2023–2024	Norrby IF	43	(2)
2024–	IK Brage	29	(2)

International career
2017	Sweden U16	4	(0)
2018	Sweden U17	2	(0)
2019	Sweden U18	1	(0)
- * Club domestic league appearances and goals as of 13 November 2025

Teodor Wålemark (born 25 June 2001) is a Swedish professional footballer who plays as a centre-back for IK Brage.

== Club career ==
=== Early career & BK Häcken ===
Wålemark spent his first months of life in Cyprus, where his father played professional football for AEL Limassol. They returned to Ljungskile in 2004, where Wålemark began playing football at the age of 5–6 at Ljungskile SK. When he was ten years old, the family moved to Gothenburg and football life continued in Västra Frölunda IF. As a 15-year-old, he was moved up to the A-team and after a half a season in the Swedish fourth division, where he also got his debut, he wanted to try new challenges. After a trial with BK Häcken's U19 team, which at this time was trained by Teddy Olausson, he impressed so much that despite his young age, he was promised a place in the U19 team's starting eleven. Wålemark played more or less all games for the team.

At the end of May 2019 the club confirmed, that Wålemark would be promoted to the first team squad in summer 2019, signing a professional contract until the end of 2021. However, he was never given the chance on the first team, before he left the club at the end of the season.

=== Ljungskile SK ===
On 28 November 2019, Ljungskile SK confirmed, that 18-year-old Wålemark had returned to his former childhood club on a deal until the end of 2021. Except for the first game, Wålemark played as a starter in the next 10 games in a row. In the beginning of 2021, Wålemark stated in public, that he wanted to leave the club. He officially left the club a few days later.

=== Lindome GIF ===
On 16 February 2021, Wålemark signed with Lindome GIF. He got his debut on 3 April 2021 against FC Trollhättan.

=== Norrby IF ===
On 20 December 2022 it was confirmed, that Wålemark had signed a two-year deal with Ettan Fotboll side Norrby IF.

Wålemark made a total of 46 appearances for Norrby before his departure in August 2024.

=== IK Brage ===
On August 7, 2024, Superettan club IK Brage confirmed that Wålemark joined the club on a deal until the end of 2026. Wålemark made his debut on August 27, 2024, in a league match against Helsingborgs IF.

== Personal life ==
Teodor is the son of former Swedish footballer and current coach Jörgen Wålemark. Teodor was born in Cyprus, where his father played at the time. His uncle, Bo Wålemark, is also a football coach, while his cousin, Patrik Wålemark, also is a footballer.
