= Curt Hjelm =

Swedish footballer

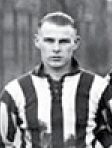
- Hjelm ca. 1935

Personal information
- Full name: Curt Einar Hjelm
- Date of birth: 3 November 1913
- Place of birth: Skedevi, Sweden
- Date of death: 5 October 1988 (aged 74)
- Place of death: Norrköping, Sweden
- Position: Forward

Senior career*
Years	Team	Apps	(Gls)
1933–1943	Sleipner		

International career
1939	Sweden	2	(2)
- * Club domestic league appearances and goals

Curt Einar Hjelm (3 November 1913 – 5 October 1988) was a Swedish footballer who played as a forward. He played his club football for IK Sleipner and also featured twice for the Sweden national team in 1939, scoring two goals. He was the Allsvenskan top scorer when Sleipner won the 1937–38 Allsvenskan title.

== Career statistics ==
=== International ===
Appearances and goals by national team and year
National team	Year	Apps	Goals
Sweden	1939	2	2
Total		2	2

Scores and results list Sweden's goal tally first, score column indicates score after each Hjelm goal.

List of international goals scored by Curt Hjelm
No.	Date	Venue	Opponent	Score	Result	Competition	Ref.
1	11 June 1939	Tingvalla IP, Karlstad, Sweden	Lithuania	2–0	7–0	Friendly	
2	11 June 1939	Tingvalla IP, Karlstad, Sweden	Lithuania	3–0	7–0	Friendly	

== Honours ==
Sleipner

- Allsvenskan: 1937–38

Individual

- Allsvenskan top scorer: 1937–38
