= Fanis Theofanous =

Cypriot footballer (born 1959)

Personal information
- Full name: Theofanis Theofanous
- Date of birth: 2 July 1959 (age 67)
- Place of birth: Cyprus
- Position: Forward

Senior career*
Years	Team	Apps	(Gls)
1978–1985	Pezoporikos Larnaca		
1985–1988	Omonia		

International career
1978–1984	Cyprus	23	(2)
- * Club domestic league appearances and goals

Theofanis "Fanis" Theofanous (Greek: Θεοφάνης "Φανής" Θεοφάνους; born 2 July 1959) is a Cypriot former footballer who played as a forward and made 23 appearances for the Cyprus national team.

== Career ==
Theofanous made his debut for Cyprus on 15 November 1978 in a friendly match against Saudi Arabia, which finished as a 2–2 draw. He went on to make 23 appearances, scoring 2 goals, before making his last appearance on 31 October 1984 in a friendly match against Canada, which finished as a 0–0 draw.

== Career statistics ==
=== International ===
Cyprus
Year	Apps	Goals
1978	1	0
1980	2	0
1981	5	0
1982	5	0
1983	6	1
1984	4	1
Total	23	2

=== International goals ===
No.	Date	Venue	Opponent	Score	Result	Competition
1	27 March 1983	Makario Stadium, Nicosia, Cyprus	Czechoslovakia	1–0	1–1	UEFA Euro 1984 qualifying
2	11 April 1984	Leoforos Alexandras Stadium, Athens, Greece	Greece	1–1	1–1	Friendly
