= Bjørn Johansen =

Bjørn Johansen may refer to:

- Bjørn Johansen (footballer) (born 1969), former Norwegian footballer
- Bjørn Johansen (ice hockey) (born 1944), Norwegian ice hockey player
- Bjørn Johansen (musician) (1940–2002), Norwegian jazz musician

== See also ==
- Bjorn Johansson (disambiguation)
