= Mats Jingblad =

Swedish footballer (born 1958)

Personal information
- Full name: Mats Olof Jingblad
- Date of birth: 9 August 1958 (age 68)
- Place of birth: Halmstad, Sweden
- Position: Striker

Senior career*
Years	Team	Apps	(Gls)
1976–1977	BK Astrio		
1977–1987	Halmstads BK	215	(64)
1988–1991	BK Astrio		

International career
1976–1977	Sweden U19	5	(0)
1978–1986	Sweden U21, Olympic	13	(3)
1982–1984	Sweden	11	(8)

Managerial career
- 1992–1995: Halmstads BK
- 1996–1998: IFK Göteborg
- 1998–1999: Iraklis Thessaloniki
- 2000–2002: Örebro SK
- 2003–2004: Iraklis Thessaloniki
- 2004–2005: Landskrona BoIS
- 2006–2008: IFK Norrköping
- 2018-: BK Astrio
- * Club domestic league appearances and goals

Mats Olof Jingblad (born 9 August 1958) is a Swedish football coach and former footballer who played as a striker.

== Club career ==
Jingblad played for BK Astrio and Halmstads BK. He made a total of 216 appearances for Halmstads BK.

== International career ==
Jingblad represented the Sweden national team eleven times between 1982 and 1984, scoring eight goals. He also represented the Sweden U19, U21, and Olympic teams between 1976 and 1986.

== Managerial career ==
Jingblad started his managing career at Halmstads BK, where we won the Svenska Cupen in 1995. In 1996 he joined IFK Göteborg and won the league title the same year. In 2007 he coached IFK Norrköping to promotion to the Swedish top division.

In late 2013 he was announced as the new sporting director of Hammarby in the second tier in Sweden. He left the club in early 2017, with the club having achieved promotion to the Swedish top division in 2014.

In the summer of 2018 he took over as coach for fifth tier BK Astrio, the club where he once started his career as a player.

== Career statistics ==
Appearances and goals by national team and year
National team	Year	Apps	Goals
Sweden	1982	1	1
Sweden	1983	6	7
Sweden	1984	4	0
Total		11	8

Scores and results list Sweden's goal tally first, score column indicates score after each Jingblad goal.

List of international goals scored by Mats Jingblad
No.	Date	Venue	Opponent	Score	Result	Competition
1	6 October 1982	Tehelné pole, Bratislava, Czechoslovakia	Czechoslovakia	1–2	2–2	UEFA Euro 1984 qualification
2	17 August 1983	Laugardalsvöllur, Reykjavík, Iceland	Iceland	1–0	4–0	Friendly
3	16 November 1983	Queen's Park Oval, Port of Spain, Trinidad and Tobago	Trinidad and Tobago	2–0	5–0	Friendly
4	16 November 1983	Queen's Park Oval, Port of Spain, Trinidad and Tobago	Trinidad and Tobago	3–0	5–0	Friendly
5	16 November 1983	Queen's Park Oval, Port of Spain, Trinidad and Tobago	Trinidad and Tobago	4–0	5–0	Friendly
6	19 November 1983	Barbados National Stadium, Saint Michael, Barbados	Barbados	2–0	4–0	Friendly
7	19 November 1983	Barbados National Stadium, Saint Michael, Barbados	Barbados	3–0	4–0	Friendly
8	19 November 1983	Barbados National Stadium, Saint Michael, Barbados	Barbados	4–0	4–0	Friendly
