= Erik Eriksson (Swedish footballer) =

Swedish footballer and manager

Personal information
- Full name: Erik Eriksson
- Date of birth: 28 October 1914
- Place of birth: Borlänge, Sweden
- Date of death: 24 April 1990 (aged 75)
- Place of death: Borlänge, Sweden
- Position: Defender

Youth career
- 1929–32: IK Brage

Senior career*
Years	Team	Apps	(Gls)
1933–1945	IK Brage		

International career
1939	Sweden	1	(0)

Managerial career
- 1943–1944: IK Brage
- 1947: IK Brage
- Leksands IF
- Heros
- Idkerberget Rämshyttans IK
- Falu BS
- 1958–1959: IK Brage
- * Club domestic league appearances and goals

Erik Eriksson (28 October 1914 – 24 April 1990) was a Swedish football player and manager who spent most of his career at IK Brage. He joined the club's youth team in 1929 after being discovered while playing for a school team. The year after he started playing with the reserves and in 1933 he finally got to join the first team. He played for the club until 1945, acting as a player manager for the last few years. In 1939 he played his only game with the national team against Lithuania.
