= Marcus Johansson (ice hockey, born 1979) =

Swedish ice hockey player

- Born: July 16, 1979 (age 45); Uppvidinge, Sweden
- Height: 6 ft 0 in (183 cm)
- Weight: 198 lb (90 kg; 14 st 2 lb)
- Position: Defenceman
- Shot: Left
- Played for: Växjö Lakers Hockey
- Playing career: 2011–2014

Björn Ola Marcus Johansson (born July 16, 1979) is a Swedish former professional ice hockey defenceman.

Johansson was born and grew up in Uppvidinge, Sweden, with Lenhovda IF as his youth team. He got to play with team Småland in the 1995 TV-pucken tournament. After two seasons with the senior Lenhovda team of the Swedish Division 3, Johansson signed with the Division 1 club Tingsryds AIF before the 1998–99 season. The club was quickly promoted to the second-tier league HockeyAllsvenskan (Swe-1), but after three seasons in the second tier, Tingsryd were relegated back to the third-tier league Division 1 before the 2002–03 season due to financial problems.

After nine seasons in Tingsryd, Johansson left the club and signed with Karlskrona HK of the Division 2 before the 2006–07 season. His defensive play helped Karlskrona promote to Division 1. After one Division 1 season with Karlskrona, which ended with play in the second playoff round, Johansson moved to sign with Växjö Lakers Hockey of the HockeyAllsvenskan. In his second season with the team, the Lakers won the 2011 Kvalserien and were promoted to the top-tier league Elitserien.

Despite this, and the fact that Johansson stayed with the Lakers team for the 2011–12 season, he was loaned to his former HockeyAllsvenskan team, Tingsryd, on September 19, 2011, having not played a single Elitserien game. However, two weeks later he returned to the Lakers team. He played for them in 15 games before he was completely released from the Lakers club on January 31, 2012. He returned to Tingsryd.
