= Thomas Johansson (footballer, born 1961) =

Swedish footballer

Personal information
- Full name: Kjell Thomas Johansson
- Date of birth: 20 December 1961 (age 64)
- Height: 1.82 m (5 ft 11 1/2 in)
- Position: Forward

Youth career
- 1968–1975: Håbro IF

Senior career*
Years	Team	Apps	(Gls)
1975–1980	Håbro IF		
1981	Bro IK		
1981–1988	AIK Fotboll	120	(41)
1989	IFK Eskilstuna		
1989	AIK Fotboll	5	(2)
1990–1992	Väsby IK		
1993–1995	Huvudsta IS		

International career
	Sweden U21	1	
- * Club domestic league appearances and goals

Kjell Thomas Johansson is a Swedish former footballer who played mainly as a forward for AIK Fotboll.
