= Henrik Eigenbrod =

Danish footballer and manager (born 1956)

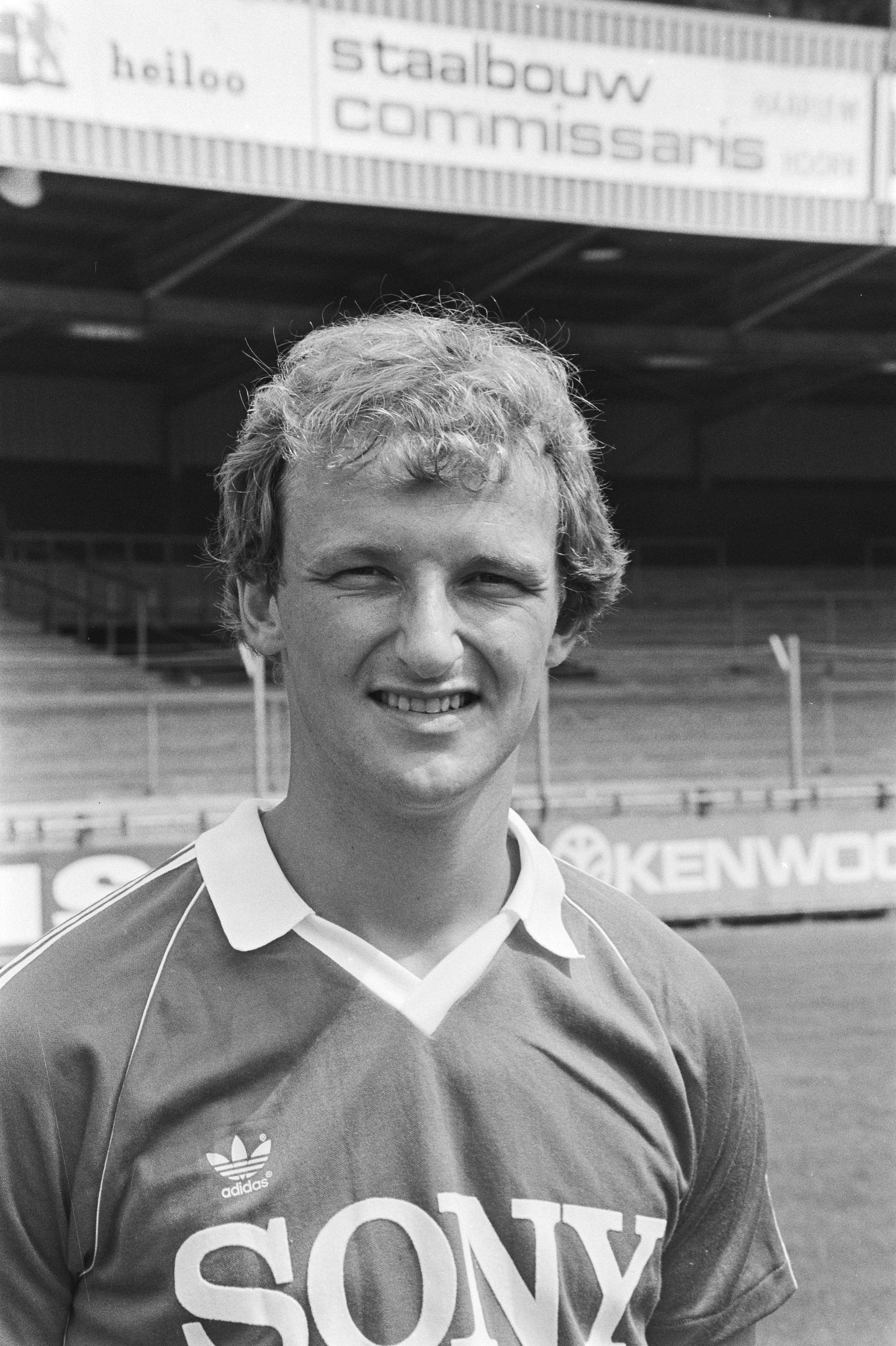
- 1982 for AZ '67

Personal information
- Full name: Poul Henrik Eigenbrod
- Date of birth: 19 May 1956 (age 70)
- Place of birth: Svendborg, Denmark
- Position: Defender

Senior career*
Years	Team	Apps	(Gls)
1977–1982	Kjøbenhavns Boldklub		
1982–1984	AZ Alkmaar	33	(1)
1984–1985	Odense Boldklub		
1985–1988	Kjøbenhavns Boldklub		

International career
1977–1978	Denmark U21	3	(0)
1981–1984	Denmark	9	(2)

Managerial career
- 1990–1993: Jægersborg Boldklub
- * Club domestic league appearances and goals

Poul Henrik Eigenbrod (born 19 May 1956), known as Henrik Eigenbrod, is a Danish former association football player and manager. He played in the defender position, and represented Kjøbenhavns Boldklub, Odense Boldklub, as well as Dutch club AZ Alkmaar. He played nine games and scored two goals for the Denmark national football team from 1981 to 1984. He also represented the Denmark national under-21 football team. He was the manager of Jægersborg Boldklub from 1990 to 1993.
