= Andreas Ravelli =

Swedish former footballer (born 1959)

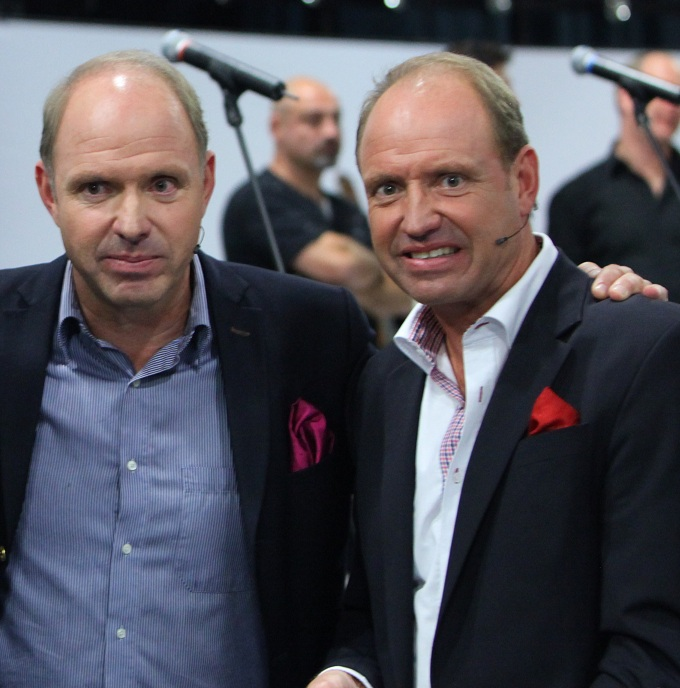
- Ravelli (right) with brother Thomas in 2010

Personal information
- Date of birth: 13 August 1959 (age 67)
- Place of birth: Vimmerby, Sweden
- Position: Centre back

Senior career*
Years	Team	Apps	(Gls)
1977–1987	Öster	196	(12)
1988–1989	IFK Göteborg	38	(1)
1990	Lenhovda		
1991–1992	Öster	37	(0)
1993–1994	Hovmantorp		
1995–1996	Lenhovda		

International career
1979–1981	Sweden U21	12	(1)
1980–1989	Sweden	41	(2)

Managerial career
- 1997–1998: Öster
- * Club domestic league appearances and goals

Andreas Ravelli (born 13 August 1959) is a Swedish former footballer who played as a central defender. He played primarily for Öster and IFK Göteborg during a club career that spanned between 1977 and 1996. A full international between 1980 and 1989, he won 41 caps and scored two goals for the Sweden national team.

He is the twin brother of Thomas Ravelli.

== Club career ==
Born in Vimmerby, Ravelli started playing professionally for Östers IF, lasting 11 seasons with the team and winning two Allsvenskan titles before signing for IFK Göteborg.

At age 31, he moved to amateur football, representing Lenhovda IF – two stints – and Hovmantorp until his retirement (he also represented Öster in between). Later, he also worked as manager of his main club.

== International career ==
Ravelli won 41 caps for Sweden, his debut coming on 12 November 1980 in a 0–0 away draw against Israel for the 1982 FIFA World Cup qualifiers. He never participated in any international tournament, however.

== Personal life ==
Ravelli's twin brother, Thomas, is also a former footballer, who played as goalkeeper. Their father was an Austrian immigrant of Italian descent who moved to Sweden in 1952, and the siblings played alongside each other in Öster and the national team as well as one year in Göteborg.
