= Ján Kapko =

Slovak footballer

Personal information
- Date of birth: 13 September 1960 (age 66)
- Place of birth: Czechoslovakia
- Position: Defender

Youth career
- –1979: TJ Spartak Dubnica

Senior career*
Years	Team	Apps	(Gls)
1979–1980	Jednota Trenčín	31	(0)
1980–1983	Dukla Prague	39	(0)
1983–1984	Jednota Trenčín		
1984–1992	DAC Dunajská Streda	163	(1)
1994–1997	FC Spartak Trnava		
1997–2000	DAC Dunajská Streda		

International career
1980–1982	Czechoslovakia U21	17	(0)
1982–1988	Czechoslovakia	3	(0)
1987	Czechoslovakia Olympic	3	(0)
- * Club domestic league appearances and goals

Ján Kapko (born 13 September 1960) is a Slovak football coach and former player who played club football for DAC Dunajská Streda, Jednota Trenčín, Dukla Prague and Spartak Trnava. He played internationally for Czechoslovakia, making three appearances between 1982 and 1988.

== Club career ==
Kapko joined DAC Dunajská Streda in the winter of the 1984–85 season, becoming part of the side which won the 1984–85 Slovak National League. He played at Dunajská Streda for eight years, making a record 204 top-flight appearances. He was part of the first Dunajská Streda side to take part in European competition, featuring in the 1987–88 European Cup Winners' Cup. He won the Slovak Cup and the Czechoslovak Cup in 1987 with Dunajská Streda, as well as the Czech Cup in 1981 with Dukla Prague. Kapko made 236 appearances in the Czechoslovak First League, scoring once. In the 1990s he played in Austria before transferring to FC Spartak Trnava, returning to Dunajská Streda between 1997 and 2000.

== International career ==
Kapko made three appearances for the Czechoslovakia national football team between 1982 and 1988. He also played three times for the Czechoslovakia Olympic football team in 1987. At junior level, Kapko scored 3 goals in 25 appearances for his country between 1977 and 1979. He later made 17 appearances for the Czechoslovakia national under-21 football team between 1980 and 1982.

== Coaching career ==
Kapko became a football coach after concluding his professional playing career, combining that with playing at an amateur level. He also coached youth teams.

== Honours ==
Dukla Prague

- Czech Cup: 1980–81

Dunajská Streda

- Czechoslovak Cup: 1986–87
- Slovak Cup: 1986–87
