= Rolf Eriksson =

Swedish footballer

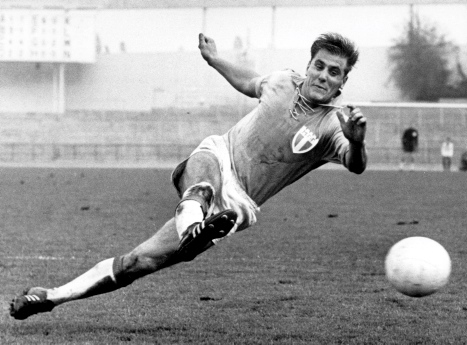

Personal information
- Full name: Rolf Eriksson
- Date of birth: 9 March 1942
- Place of birth: Sweden
- Date of death: 1984 (aged 41–42)
- Place of death: Sweden
- Position: Forward

Senior career*
Years	Team	Apps	(Gls)
1961–1965	Malmö FF	69	(22)
1966–?	IFK Trelleborg		
- * Club domestic league appearances and goals

Rolf Eriksson (9 March 1942 – 1984) was a Swedish football forward who played the majority of his career for Malmö FF.

== Career ==
Eriksson started his career at Malmö FF where he played in various youth teams before reaching the first team in 1961. He had a strong physique but he was fast nevertheless and had a powerful shot, this resulted in him being called the new Gunnar Nordahl. For his first season in Allsvenskan Allsvenskan he played in all of the matches and managed to score nine goals, he repeated the feat the coming year when he scored ten goals.

The successful start of his career made him an interest for Italian Serie A club Bologna who wanted him to transfer to the club, however the Italian Football Federation introduced a ban on all foreign players and Eriksson had to remain in Malmö even though all contracts were signed. Competition in the starting line-up was though back in Malmö and Eriksson soon saw himself replaced by Bo Larsson among others. He also started to pick up habits and stopped training properly which made him unfit to play for the team. In 1966 he transferred to Division 2 side IFK Trelleborg where he got off to a good start and a new beginning for his career. However, Eriksson never managed to get his health or career back on track and died 42 years of age in 1984.
