= Roger Albertsen =

Norwegian footballer (1957–2003)

Personal information
- Date of birth: 15 March 1957
- Place of birth: Odda Municipality, Norway
- Date of death: 2 March 2003 (aged 45)
- Position: Midfielder

Youth career
- Odda IL

Senior career*
Years	Team	Apps	(Gls)
1973–1975	Odda IL		
1975–1979	FC Den Haag	117	(16)
1979–1980	Feyenoord	28	(1)
1980–1981	FC Den Haag	18	(6)
1981–1982	KFC Winterslag	39	(3)
1982–1985	Olympiacos	65	(7)
1985–1987	Rosenborg	35	(5)
Total		299	(38)

International career
1976–1984	Norway	25	(3)

Managerial career
- 1986-1987: Orkanger IF
- 1989–1992: Sistranda IL
- 1993–1996: Sokna IL
- 1997–2001: Kongsberg IF
- * Club domestic league appearances and goals

Roger Albertsen (15 March 1957 – 2 March 2003) was a Norwegian former professional footballer who played as a midfielder. At the age of 17 he travelled abroad, playing professionally for Dutch team FC Den Haag. He later played for Feyenoord Rotterdam, KFC Winterslag and Olympiacos, before he returned to Norway in 1985, making his debut in the Norwegian Premier League for Rosenborg.

== Club career ==
=== Netherlands ===
Albertsen began his career with local lower-division sides Tyssedal and Odda. He was regarded as a promising talent, and represented Norway several times at youth level. Nonetheless, it came as something of a shock when he left the country at age 17 to try his luck in the Netherlands, joining his compatriot Harald Berg's old club Den Haag. Albertsen made his debut for the club in 1975, and soon became a regular in the Den Haag lineup, earning praise for his tireless running and no–nonsense physical play. His performance in the Eredivisie at Den Haag did not go unnoticed back home and he made his debut for Norway in 1976.

In the summer of 1979, Albertsen was transferred to Feyenoord, where he became a valuable player in the side that finished fourth in the league and won the cup. However, at the end of the season, after just one year in Rotterdam, he returned to Den Haag.

=== Winterslag ===
Albertsen played one more season for Den Haag, and then he was on the move again – this time to Belgian side Winterslag (now known as Racing Genk following a 1988 merger), reportedly because the municipality of The Hague argued Albertsen behaved unsportsmanlike due to his yellow and red cards that season. Albertsen quickly became a fan favorite at the Belgian club, and his performances earned him a recall to the national team for the World Cup qualifier against England – the game that would provide Albertsen's finest moment in a Norway shirt.

=== Olympiacos ===
Midway through the 1982–83 season, Albertsen was signed by Greek giants Olympiacos, where he won a league championship medal. He spent three years at the club, doing the dirty work in midfield, before his old friend Arne Dokken persuaded him to return home and play for Rosenborg

=== Rosenborg ===
So, in the summer of 1985, after a decade abroad, Albertsen played his first-ever top division game in the Norwegian league. He was a member of the Rosenborg side that won the title in dramatic fashion in 1985, and played two more years at the Trondheim club before retiring because of injury at the end of the 1987 season.

== International career ==
Albertsen was capped 25 times for Norway, having debuted in 1976. Many remember him from the famous match against England in 1981, where he was awarded the 1–1 goal, despite that television replays have later shown that Albertsen did in fact not touch the ball, and Tom Lund's cross went straight into the net.

He made his international debut in a World Cup qualifier against Switzerland in 1976. He is credited with scoring the equaliser in Norway's win over England in 1981. Bryan Robson gave the visitors the lead after 15 minutes. In the 35th minute, Albertsen went after a cross from Tom Lund and the ball went into the net. Albertsen was credited with the goal, but television replays seem to indicate that Albertsen did not make contact with the ball before it crossed the line. Hallvar Thoresen scored Norway's second goal four minutes before half-time and Norway went on to win the game 2–1.

Albertsen now got an extended run in the national side, and scored two more goals in a pair of summer friendlies. This time there was no doubt about Albertsen being the scorer. He was also a member of the team that defeated Yugoslavia 3–1 in a Euro 84 qualifier. Shortly after that match, he was on the move again.

== Style of play ==
Albertsen was a midfielder known for his physical style of play and consistent work rate. Although he did not become a regular first-choice selection for the Norway national team, he contributed reliably when called upon. While not primarily recognized for technical flair, he was valued for his determination and commitment at club level.

== Retirement and death ==
After retiring from the game, Albertsen worked in the computer business, and also held coaching jobs for lower-division sides Sistranda, Orkanger, Sokna and Kongsberg. In late 2002, he was diagnosed with cancer, and he died from the disease in March 2003.

== Honours ==
Feyenoord

- KNVB Cup: 1979–80

Olympiacos

- Super League Greece: 1982–83

Rosenborg

- Norwegian Premier League: 1985

Individual

- Norwegian Football Association Gold Watch
