= Bo Wålemark =

Swedish football manager and former player

Personal information
- Date of birth: 18 August 1964 (age 62)
- Place of birth: Uddevalla, Sweden
- Position: Defender

Senior career*
Years	Team	Apps	(Gls)
- Ljungskile SK
1986	IK Oddevold	5	(1)
1994–1997	Ljungskile SK		

Managerial career
- 1990–1994: Ljungskile SK
- 1998: Ljungskile SK
- 1999–2000: Vallens IF
- 2000: Ljungskile SK (assistant manager)
- 2001: Vallens IF
- 2003–2006: IK Oddevold
- 2009–2011: Ljungskile SK
- 2011–2013: IK Brage
- * Club domestic league appearances and goals

Bo Wålemark is a Swedish football manager and former player. In 2011 became the manager of IK Brage. Born in Uddevalla, Sweden, Wålemark is particularly associated with Ljungskile SK, where he served as both a player and manager during several periods of the club's history. He has also managed IK Oddevold, Vallens IF and IK Brage.

Wålemark was involved with Ljungskile during the period in which the small western Swedish club rose rapidly through the Swedish football league system, culminating in promotion to the Allsvenskan for the first time in the club's history in 1996.

== Playing career ==
Wålemark played as a defender. He began his senior career with Ljungskile SK before spending the 1986 season with IK Oddevold, where he made five league appearances and scored one goal.

He later returned to Ljungskile and played for the club from 1994 to 1997. His second spell coincided with one of the most successful periods in Ljungskile's history. The club, which had begun the 1990 season in Division 5, climbed through the Swedish league system and secured promotion to the Allsvenskan in November 1996.

Wålemark was therefore part of the Ljungskile organization during the club's transformation from a lower-division side into a top-flight team.

== Managerial career ==
=== Ljungskile SK ===
Wålemark began his managerial career with Ljungskile SK, taking charge from 1990 to 1994. The period marked the beginning of Ljungskile's remarkable progression through the Swedish football pyramid.

After subsequently playing for the club, Wålemark returned as manager in 1998. He later served as an assistant manager at Ljungskile in 2000.

Wålemark returned to the club again as a senior coach between 2009 and 2011. During this period Ljungskile competed in Superettan, the second tier of Swedish football.

His long association with the club, spanning roles as a player, head coach and assistant coach, made him one of several members of the Wålemark family closely connected with Ljungskile's modern history.

=== Vallens IF ===
Wålemark managed Vallens IF from 1999 to 2000 before returning briefly to Ljungskile as an assistant coach. He subsequently had another spell in charge of Vallens in 2001.

=== IK Oddevold ===
From 2003 to 2006, Wålemark served as manager of IK Oddevold, a club he had previously represented as a player.

=== IK Brage ===
In November 2011, Wålemark and Örjan Glans were appointed as the new coaches of IK Brage, with responsibility for the team beginning ahead of the 2012 season. The pair had previously worked together at Ljungskile.

Wålemark later returned to Brage ahead of the 2014 season, this time as head coach with Gerhard Andersson serving as assistant manager. Wålemark remained in charge until June 2015, when Brage and the coaching staff agreed to end their cooperation.

IK Brage has subsequently described Wålemark as having had two managerial spells with the club, in 2012 and 2014–2015.

== Personal life ==
Football has played a prominent role in the Wålemark family. Bo Wålemark is the brother of former footballer and manager Jörgen Wålemark, another figure strongly associated with Ljungskile SK.

He is also the uncle of professional footballer Teodor Wålemark, who has played for clubs including BK Häcken, Norrby IF and IK Brage. When Teodor joined Brage, the club noted the family's previous connection with the team through Bo's periods as manager.

The Wålemark family has a particularly long association with Ljungskile SK. Bo and Jörgen's generation formed part of a broader football tradition closely connected with the club and the community around Ljungskile.
