= Zdeněk Prokeš =

Czech footballer (1953–2024)

Personal information
- Date of birth: 13 June 1953
- Place of birth: České Budějovice, Czechoslovakia
- Date of death: 1 August 2024 (aged 71)
- Place of death: Prague, Czech Republic
- Position: Central defender

Senior career*
Years	Team	Apps	(Gls)
1971–1972	IGLA České Budějovice		
1972–1974	Dukla Prague	0	(0)
1974–1985	Bohemians Prague	294	(18)
1985–1988	1860 Munich	87	(18)

International career
1977–1985	Czechoslovakia	19	(1)
- * Club domestic league appearances and goals

Zdeněk Prokeš (13 June 1953 – 1 August 2024) was a Czech footballer who played as a central defender. He started his career at Dukla Prague in 1972, moving to Bohemians Praha during the 1974–1975 season, where he made 294 appearances and scored 18 goals. He transferred in Germany to 1860 Munich club in 1985 and had 87 appearances and scored 18 times.

He was selected 19 times in the national team of Czechoslovakia and scored 1 goal.

Prokeš committed suicide on 1 August 2024, at the age of 71.

== Honours ==
- 1982–83 Czechoslovak First League
