= 1937–38 Allsvenskan =

14th season of Allsvenskan

Allsvenskan
- Season: 1937–38
- Champions: IK Sleipner
- Relegated: IFK Göteborg; GAIS
- Top goalscorer: Curt Hjelm, IK Sleipner (13)
- Average attendance: 8,140

Statistics of Allsvenskan in season 1937/1938.

== Overview ==
The league was contested by 12 teams, with IK Sleipner winning the championship. Following Sleipner in the table were three clubs all with the same points, thus leaving goal ratio as the tie breaker (as was the case until the 1940–41 season).

== League table ==
Pos	Team	Pld	W	D	L	GF	GA	GD	Pts	Qualification or relegation
1	IK Sleipner (C)	22	12	6	4	46	28	+18	30	
2	Hälsingborgs IF	22	12	2	8	36	27	+9	26	
3	Landskrona BoIS	22	10	6	6	40	31	+9	26	
4	IF Elfsborg	22	12	2	8	44	37	+7	26	
5	Gårda	22	8	9	5	29	28	+1	25	
6	AIK	22	9	6	7	44	37	+7	24	
7	IK Brage	22	9	3	10	45	44	+1	21	
8	Sandvikens IF	22	8	5	9	29	32	−3	21	
9	Malmö FF	22	6	8	8	20	30	−10	20	
10	Örgryte IS	22	7	5	10	33	37	−4	19	
11	IFK Göteborg (R)	22	6	4	12	28	35	−7	16	Relegation to Division 2
12	GAIS (R)	22	3	4	15	19	47	−28	10	Relegation to Division 2

Rules for classification: 1) points; 2) goal difference; 3) number of goals scored.
(C) Champions; (R) Relegated

== Results ==
Home \ Away	AIK	GAIS	GBK	HIF	IFE	IFK	IKB	IKS	BOIS	MFF	SIF	ÖIS
AIK		3–1	1–2	1–1	4–1	1–1	2–2	3–1	1–1	4–0	3–2	1–3
GAIS	0–2		0–1	1–2	2–4	1–4	0–2	2–4	0–4	1–1	0–3	2–0
Gårda BK	3–1	0–0		1–1	1–3	3–2	1–0	1–1	1–1	0–0	1–0	1–1
Hälsingborgs IF	0–3	2–3	0–1		3–0	0–2	5–1	4–2	2–0	2–1	2–0	3–1
IF Elfsborg	2–0	2–1	2–3	1–2		3–0	6–4	2–0	3–2	2–1	1–0	4–0
IFK Göteborg	1–2	0–0	3–2	0–1	0–2		1–3	5–1	1–4	1–2	0–1	0–0
IK Brage	5–4	0–1	4–2	1–2	1–1	4–1		0–0	2–3	5–0	2–3	2–1
IK Sleipner	3–0	1–0	3–2	1–0	3–1	1–0	4–1		6–0	1–1	1–1	3–0
Landskrona BoIS	2–2	4–0	3–1	1–0	1–0	1–3	3–1	3–3		0–0	3–1	2–0
Malmö FF	2–0	1–0	0–0	1–3	2–1	2–0	1–2	1–1	1–1		0–3	2–1
Sandvikens IF	3–3	5–2	1–1	2–0	2–2	0–0	0–3	0–2	1–0	1–0		0–2
Örgryte IS	1–3	2–2	1–1	3–1	5–1	1–3	3–0	1–4	2–1	1–1	4–0	

Legend: Blue = home team win; Yellow = draw; Red = away team win.

== Attendances ==
#	Club	Average	Highest
1	AIK	17,196	34,150
2	Malmö FF	9,757	14,216
3	IFK Göteborg	9,754	13,912
4	IK Sleipner	9,137	17,391
5	Gårda BK	7,758	26,178
6	Örgryte IS	7,697	13,098
7	Hälsingborgs IF	7,448	13,818
8	IK Brage	6,791	12,225
9	GAIS	6,744	13,912
10	IF Elfsborg	6,242	9,639
11	Landskrona BoIS	3,831	7,500
12	Sandvikens IF	3,745	8,300
