= Ari Valvee =

Finnish footballer (born 1960)

Personal information
- Full name: Ari Valvee
- Date of birth: 1 December 1960 (age 65)
- Place of birth: Eura, Finland
- Height: 1.81 m (5 ft 11 1/2 in)
- Position: Striker

Senior career*
Years	Team	Apps	(Gls)
1978–1984	Haka	91	(34)
1984–1985	Vasalund	?	(?)
1985–1987	HJK Helsinki	21	(11)
1987–1990	Haka	54	(14)
1990–1992	Pallo-Iirot	?	(?)

International career^{‡}
1980–1989	Finland	47	(8)
- * Club domestic league appearances and goals as of 5 October 2009 ‡ National team caps and goals as of 5 October 2009

Ari Valvee (born 1 December 1960) is a retired football striker.

During his professional career, Valvee played for Haka, Vasalund, HJK Helsinki and Pallo-Iirot. His youth club was Euran Pallo. Valvee played 47 caps for Finland. Valvee scored a game-winning goal against Northern Ireland in a 1986 FIFA World Cup qualification match.
