= Lenhovda IF =

Swedish sports association

Lenhovda IF logo.

Lenhovda IF is a Swedish sports association, located in Lenhovda, Sweden and was founded in 1928. The club runs several sports, mostly known for their football (soccer) club but also for ice hockey, skiing, tennis, gymnastics and badminton. The two most successful sports are football and ice hockey. Lenhovda IF are at the moment playing in the lowest division in both football and ice hockey.

== History ==
Football: Lenhovda IF is currently playing in the eight tier league Division 6, with Lenhovda IP as their home arena. However, Lenhovda's greatest moments were in the late 1970s. During the second half of the 1970s, Lenhovda played in the fourth division which is in the same tier as today's Division 3. In the 1978 season, Lenhovda had a brilliant year. One highlight of the season came when they beat the national team of Saudi Arabia with 5–3 in a friendly match. But the best part of the season came in the end of it, when Lenhovda had the chance to be promoted to the third division, which is in the same tier as today's Division 2. It was the last game of the year, when Lenhovda played a game on their home ground in front of 1,100 attendants. Lenhovda won the game 2–1 and promoted to Division 3.
