= Rolf Zetterlund =

Swedish footballer and manager

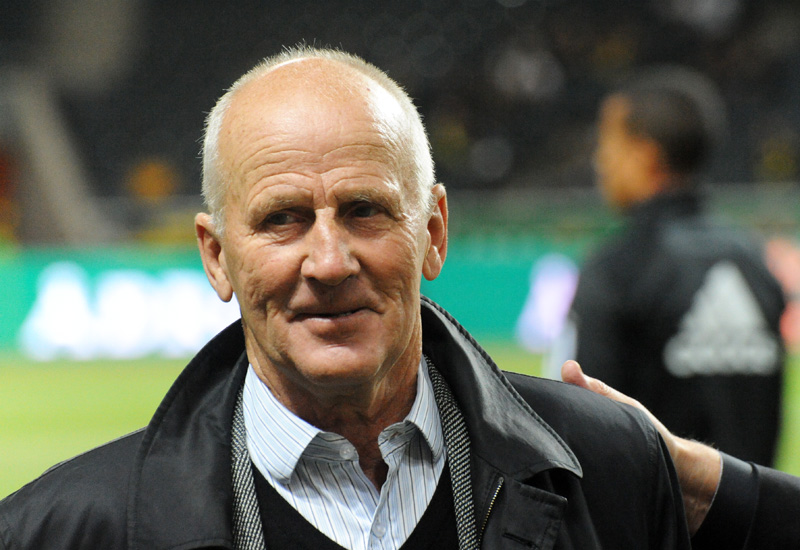
- Rolf Zetterlund in April 2013

Personal information
- Full name: Rolf Anders Zetterlund
- Date of birth: 2 January 1942 (age 84)
- Place of birth: Ludvika, Sweden
- Position: Midfielder

Youth career
- 1954–1960: Utansjö AIF
- 1960–1961: Wäija/Dynäs IK
- 1961–1962: Kramfors IF

Senior career*
Years	Team	Apps	(Gls)
1963–1964	Åtvidabergs FF		
1965–1968	Sandåkerns SK		
1969–1971	Sandvikens IF		
1972–1976	AIK	117	(11)
1977–1980	IK Brage		

Managerial career
- 1977–1980: IK Brage
- 1981–1986: AIK
- 1987–1992: Örebro SK
- 1993: Spårvägens FF
- 1994–1996: Malmö FF
- 1997–1999: Hammarby IF
- 2000–2001: Vasalunds IF
- 2002–2003: Vallentuna BK
- 2005: Vasalund/Essinge IF
- * Club domestic league appearances and goals

Rolf Anders Zetterlund (born 2 January 1942) is a Swedish former football player and manager. He was the 1980 recipient of Guldbollen as Sweden's best footballer of the year.

== Playing career ==
Zetterlund played for Atvidabergs FF, Sandvikens IF, AIK and IK Brage during a career that spanned between 1963 and 1980. He was bestowed the Swedish Football player of the year award when he retired in 1980, at the age of 38, never having been called up to the Sweden national team.

== Managerial career ==
Zetterlund coached IK Brage, AIK, Örebro SK, Spårvägens FF, Malmö FF, Hammarby IF, Vasalunds IF, Vallentuna BK and Vasalund/Essinge IF between 1977 and 2005.

== Honours ==
Individual

- Guldbollen: 1980
