= Hannu Turunen =

Finnish footballer (born 1956)

Personal information
- Date of birth: 24 June 1956 (age 70)
- Place of birth: Savonlinna, Finland
- Positions: Defender; midfielder

Senior career*
Years	Team	Apps	(Gls)
1978–1982	Koparit	129	(22)
1983–1993	KuPS	206	(5)

International career
1979–1987	Finland	66	(3)
- * Club domestic league appearances and goals

Hannu Turunen (born 24 June 1956) is a Finnish former footballer. Turunen played for Koparit and KuPS during his club career, also making 66 appearances for the Finland national football team, scoring 3 goals.

== External links and references ==
- Hannu Turunen at National-Football-Teams.com
- Finland – International Player Records
