= IK Brage =

Swedish football club

- Full name: Idrottsklubben Brage
- Short name: IK Brage
- Founded: 6 February 1925; 101 years ago as IK Blixt
- Ground: Domnarvsvallen, Borlänge
- Capacity: 6,500
- Chairman: Ulf Aronsson
- Head coach: Lennart "Kral" Andersson
- League: Superettan
- 2025: Superettan, 8th of 16
- Website: http://ikbrage.se/
Home colours	Away colours	Third colours

Idrottsklubben Brage, also known as IK Brage or simply Brage, is a Swedish football club located in Borlänge. The club is affiliated with Dalarnas Fotbollförbund and play their home games at Domnarvsvallen. The club colours, reflected in their crest and kit, are green and white. The club can be seen as a continuation of IK Blixt which was founded in the early 1920s but merged into Domnarvets GoIF in 1923. Two years later the merger was split and IK Blixt changed their name to IK Brage, after the Norse god Bragi. The club has played a total of 18 seasons in Allsvenskan, which is the highest level of the Swedish football league system. They currently play in the second highest level (Superettan) where the season lasts from April to November. IK Brage also recently spent time in the third division Division 1 (2014–2017) and fourth division Division 2 between 2005 and 2009) but has mainly played in the two highest Swedish divisions since its foundation.

== History ==
=== Creation and early rise ===
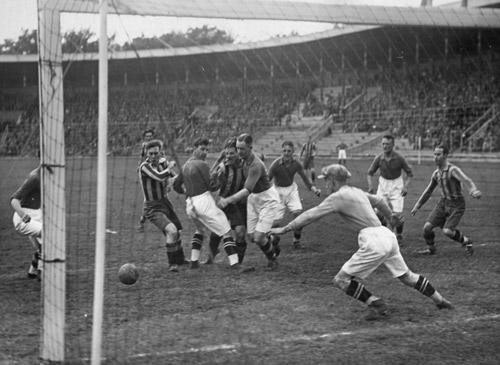
Brage playing in the 1930 promotion playoff game against Djurgårdens IF which qualified them for their first ever Allsvenskan season.

In the early 1920s the two Borlänge clubs IK Blixt and Domnarvets GIF merged to form a new club by the name of Domnarvets GoIF. The motive for the merger was to combine their efforts in building the new stadium that would become Domnarvsvallen. The merger did not go smoothly however as the IK Blixt members felt that there needed to be more focus on the football part of the multisport club. This caused them to want to bring back the original IK Blixt but the newly formed Domnarvets GoIF would not allow this since they technically owned the name as IK Blixt was half of the new club. So in 1925 the old IK Blixt members started up a new football club instead and decided in a meeting that the new name would be IK Brage, named after the Norse god Bragi.

After its creation, the club quickly advanced through the divisions until it reached the second highest level after the 1929–1930 season. The club would then go on to have a very successful 1930s which included playing at the highest level for the first time ever in the 1937–38 Allsvenskan. This first golden age culminated in the fourth-place finish two years later but was quickly followed by a relegation followed by a long period of time spent in the second tier.

In early years, in the winter time Brage also fielded teams in bandy.

=== 1970s misery and 1980s success ===
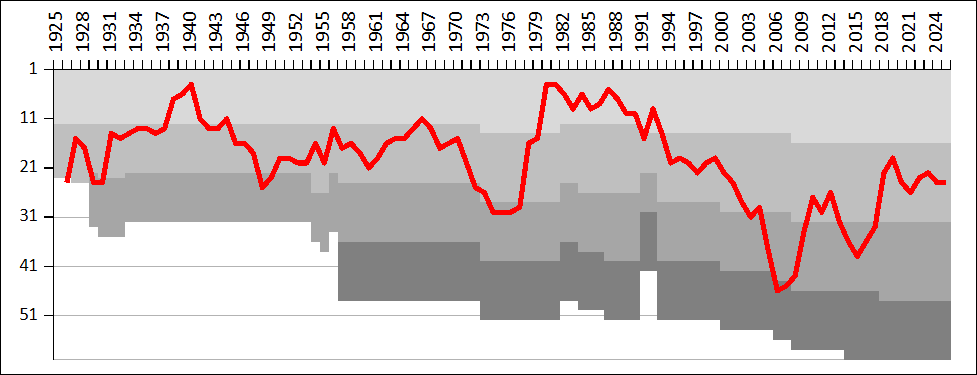
A chart showing the progress of IK Brage through the swedish football league system. The different shades of gray represent league divisions.

During the mid-1970s the club had fallen down into the third tier for the first time in nearly 30 years. After spending four straight seasons at such a low level the club brought in Rolf Zetterlund from AIK as their new player manager. During his reign the club advanced quickly through the divisions and made their return to the highest level in the 1980 Allsvenskan where they finished in fourth place, again matching their best ever finish. That same year the club also came close to winning their first major title as they finished runners-up in Svenska Cupen. The success would continue throughout the 1980s as Brage established themselves as an Allsvenskan club. During this period, which is the most successful in club history, Brage finished in the top five three times. This qualified them to compete in the UEFA Cup on several occasions where they played against clubs like Werder Bremen and Inter Milan.

=== 1990s relegation from Allsvenskan ===
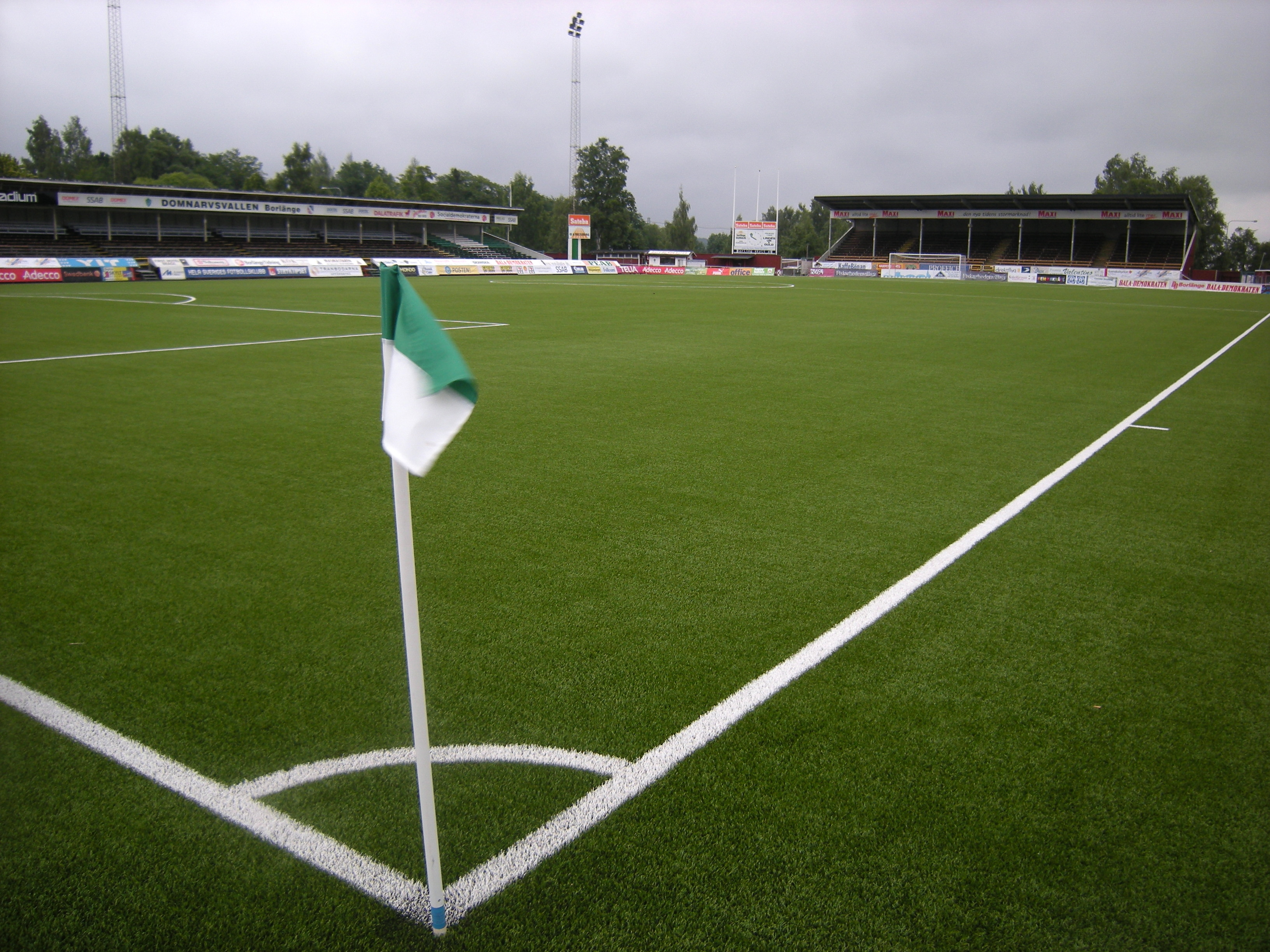
Brage home stadium Domnarvsvallen in 2010.

Brage was relegated to the second tier in 1990 and then again in their latest Allsvenskan season in 1993 after having spent the entire year in last place from the first to the last round of the league. After that they have not been able to come back to Allsvenskan.

=== 2000s performance in Superettan and struggling in Division 1 and 2 ===
Things got even worse at the start of the new millennium when the club was relegated first into the third tier but then also into the fourth, a level which the club hadn't played at since its creation in the 1920s. However, they have since bounced back and reestablished themselves in the second tier of swedish football which is from the year 2000 called Superettan.

=== 2010s successful comeback to Superettan and a new level of misery ===
IK Brage qualified against Qviding in 2009 and was promoted to Superettan for the first time since 2004. Much thanks to great team spirit influenced by the manager Lennart "Kral" Andersson", who was very popuplar among the supporters in Serik Fans. But in 2013 everything collapsed. The new chairman Tommy Andersson and the sports director contracted a lot of experienced but controversial players like Dulee Johnson, Jan Tauer and Njogu Demba Nyrén. Brage only won two games that season and half of the squad left the team before the season was over. The club was relegated to Division 1 once again and was almost in bankruptcy in 2014 and 2015 due to the failed investments in 2013. In 2019, Brage qualified for promotion playoff against Kalmar FF after a dramatic last game of the season.

== Players ==
=== First-team squad ===
As of 1 September 2026

Note: Flags indicate national team as defined under FIFA eligibility rules; some limited exceptions apply. Players may hold more than one non-FIFA nationality.

No.	Pos.	Nation	Player
1	GK	SWE	Viktor Frodig
2	DF	SWE	Alexander Zetterström
3	DF	SWE	Teodor Wålemark
4	DF	SWE	Malte Persson
5	DF	ALB	Lorik Konjuhi
6	MF	DEN	Lasse Madsen
7	MF	SWE	Jacob Stensson
8	MF	SWE	Albin Sporrong
9	FW	MKD	Filip Trpchevski
10	MF	SWE	Gustav Berggren
11	MF	SWE	Anton Lundin
12	FW	SWE	Alex Mortensen
13	GK	SWE	Adrian Engdahl

No.	Pos.	Nation	Player
14	FW	NOR	Jakob Rømo Skille
15	MF	SWE	Oliwer Stark
16	DF	RWA	York Rafael
17	MF	SWE	Pontus Jonsson
19	FW	DEN	Mass Sise
20	MF	NGR	Ozor Okeke (on loan from IF Elfsborg)
21	DF	SWE	Noah Östberg
22	DF	DEN	Tobias Stagaard
23	DF	SWE	Felix Hörberg
24	DF	SWE	Anders Hellblom
25	MF	SWE	Albin Pihlström
28	MF	SWE	Gideon Granström
30	GK	SWE	Johan Guadagno

=== Out on loan ===
Note: Flags indicate national team as defined under FIFA eligibility rules; some limited exceptions apply. Players may hold more than one non-FIFA nationality.

No.	Pos.	Nation	Player

=== Notable players ===
The following players have received the player of the year award that supporter group "Serik Fans" started giving out in 1996, or are listed as either "club legends" or foreign players with over 50 games at the club on the official Brage website.

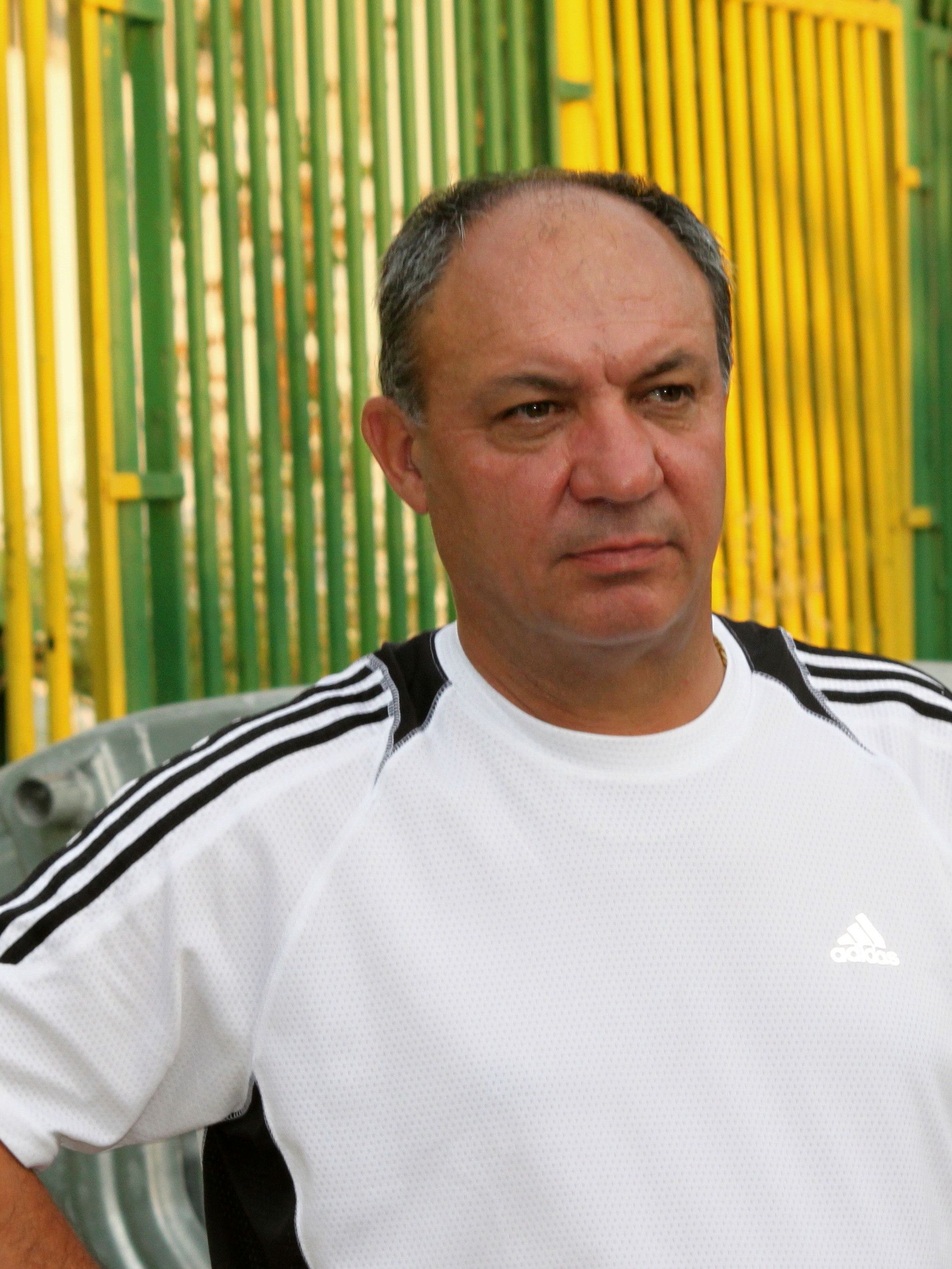
Defender Plamen Nikolov played 55 games for the Bulgaria national football team.

- (Sweden) Algot Ström
- (Sweden) Erik Eriksson
- (Sweden) Hugo Zetterberg
- (Sweden) Ingvar "Slana" Österberg
- (Sweden) Tore Åhs
- (Sweden) Stig "Lill-Massa" Johansson
- (Sweden) Sture Lindvall
- (Sweden) Thomas Nilsson
- (Sweden) Rolf Zetterlund
- (Sweden) Nils-Erik "Serik" Johansson
- (Sweden) Bernt Ljung
- (Bulgaria) Plamen Nikolov
- (England) Simon Hunt
- (Sweden) Göran Arnberg
- (Sweden) Fredrik Söderström
- (Sweden) Jon Persson
- (Socialist Federal Republic of Yugoslavia) Duško Radinović
- (Sweden) Joel Cedergren
- (Sweden) Martin Ericsson
- (Sweden) Daniel Brandt
- (Sweden) Johan Norell
- (Sweden) Lasse Nilsson
- (Sweden) Mikael Eklund
- (Sweden) Jimmy Rajala
- (Sweden) Jonathan Lundevall
- (Sweden) Niclas Olausson
- (The Gambia) Kebba Ceesay
- (Sweden) Jon Åslund
- (Sweden) Pontus Hindrikes
- (Sweden) Johan Eklund
- (Sweden) Gerhard Andersson
- (Sweden) Adam Gradén
- (Sweden) Niklas Sandberg

== Managers ==
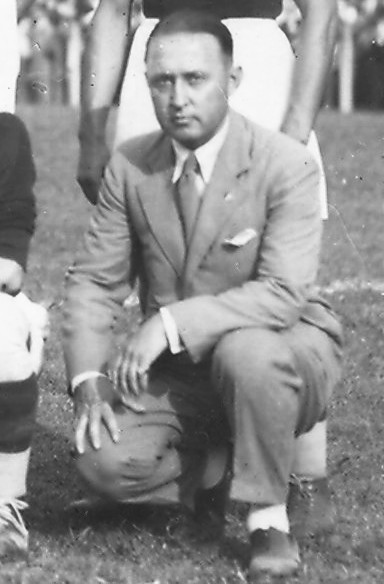
Hungarian József Nagy took charge of IK Brage in 1935 after having previously been the manager of the Sweden men's national football team as well as several Serie A clubs. Two years later he succeeded in bringing the club to Allsvenskan for the first time ever.

- (Sweden) Harry "Dicko" Magnusson (1933)
- (Hungary) József Nagy (1935–42)
- (Norway) Kristian Henriksen (1942)
- (Sweden) Otto Karlsson (1943–44)
- (Sweden) Erik Eriksson (1943–44)
- (Sweden) Erik Eriksson (1947)
- (Sweden) Sigvard Hjärpe (1948)
- (Sweden) Gösta Eriksson (1951–52)
- (Sweden) Bertil Nordahl (1953–55)
- (Sweden) Gösta Eriksson (1955–57)
- (Sweden) Erik Eriksson (1958–59)
- (Sweden) Holger Hansson (1960)
- (Sweden) Sigvard Hjärpe (1961)
- (Sweden) Lennart Samuelsson (1962–66)
- (Sweden) Bertil Bäckvall (1967–69)
- (Sweden) Imre More (1970)
- (Sweden) Lennart Samuelsson (1971–73)
- (Sweden) Gösta Eriksson (1974)
- (Sweden) Björn Bettner (1975–76)
- (Sweden) Rolf Zetterlund (1977–80)
- (Sweden) Kent Karlsson (1981–82)
- (Sweden) Conny Granqvist (1983)
- (Sweden) Kenneth Rosén (1984–85)
- (Netherlands) Jan Mak (1986)
- (Sweden) Håkan Sundin (1987)
- (Sweden) Jan Lindstedt (1988)
- (Finland) Tommy Lindholm (1989)
- (Sweden) Kjell Pettersson (1990–93)
- (Sweden) Roger Lundin (1994–96)
- (Sweden) Thomas Nilsson (1997)
- (England) Simon Hunt (1998–99)
- (Russia) Sergei Prigoda (2000–02)
- (Sweden) Roger Lundin (2002)
- (Sweden) Bernt Ljung (2003–04)
- (Sweden) Göran Bergort (2004)
- (Sweden) Lars Ericson (2005–06)
- (Sweden) Björn Lindén (2007)
- (Sweden) Anders Sjöö (2008)
- (Sweden) Johan Hällman (2008)
- (Sweden) Lennart "Kral" Andersson (2009–10)
- (Sweden) Pelle Johansson (2011)
- (Sweden) Lennart "Kral" Andersson (2011)
- (Sweden) Hans Gren (2011)
- (Sweden) Jonas Björkgren (2011)
- (Sweden) Bo Wålemark (2012)
- (Sweden) Örjan Glans (2012)
- (Sweden) Conny Karlsson (2013)
- (Serbia) Zvezdan Milosevic (2013)
- (Sweden) Bo Wålemark (2014)
- (Sweden) Bengt Ottosson (2015–17)
- (Sweden) Klebér Saarenpää (2018–23)
- (Sweden) Jan Mian and William Bergendahl (2024–25)
- (Sweden) Lennart "Kral" Andersson (2025–)

== Season to season ==
Season	Level	Division	Section	Position	Movements
1926-27	Tier 2	Division 2	Uppsvenska Serien	3rd	(Unofficial series, promotion not possible)
1927-28	Tier 2	Division 2	Uppsvenska Serien	5nd	Relegated (Unofficial series, promotion not possible)
1928-29	Tier 3	Division 3	Uppsvenska	2nd	
1929-30	Tier 3	Division 3	Uppsvenska	1st	Promotion Playoff – Promoted
1930-31	Tier 2	Division 2	Norra	2nd	
1931-32	Tier 2	Division 2	Norra	3rd	
1932-33	Tier 2	Division 2	Norra	2nd	
1933-34	Tier 2	Division 2	Norra	1st	Promotion Playoff – Not promoted
1934-35	Tier 2	Division 2	Norra	1st	Promotion Playoff – Not promoted
1935-36	Tier 2	Division 2	Norra	2nd	
1936-37	Tier 2	Division 2	Norra	1st	Promotion Playoff – Promoted
1937-38	Tier 1	Allsvenskan		7th	
1938-39	Tier 1	Allsvenskan		6th	
1939-40	Tier 1	Allsvenskan		4th	
1940-41	Tier 1	Allsvenskan		11th	Relegated
1941-42	Tier 2	Division 2	Norra	1st	Promotion Playoff – Not promoted
1942-43	Tier 2	Division 2	Norra	1st	Promotion Playoff – Promoted
1943-44	Tier 1	Allsvenskan		11th	Relegated
1944-45	Tier 2	Division 2	Norra	4th	
1945-46	Tier 2	Division 2	Norra	4th	
1946-47	Tier 2	Division 2	Norra	6th	Relegated
1947-48	Tier 3	Division 3	Norra	3rd	
1948-49	Tier 3	Division 3	Norra	1st	Promoted
1949-50	Tier 2	Division 2	Nordöstra	7th	
1950-51	Tier 2	Division 2	Nordöstra	7th	
1951-52	Tier 2	Division 2	Nordöstra	8th	
1952-53	Tier 2	Division 2	Nordöstra	8th	
1953-54	Tier 2	Division 2	Svealand	4th	
1954-55	Tier 2	Division 2	Svealand	8th	
1955-56	Tier 2	Division 2	Svealand	1st	Promotion Playoff – Not promoted
1956-57	Tier 2	Division 2	Svealand	5th	
1957-58	Tier 2	Division 2	Svealand	4th	
1959	Tier 2	Division 2	Svealand	6th	
1960	Tier 2	Division 2	Svealand	9th	
1961	Tier 2	Division 2	Svealand	7th	
1962	Tier 2	Division 2	Svealand	4th	
1963	Tier 2	Division 2	Svealand	3rd	
1964	Tier 2	Division 2	Svealand	3rd	
1965	Tier 2	Division 2	Svealand	1st	Promotion Playoff – Promoted
1966	Tier 1	Allsvenskan		11th	Relegated
1967	Tier 2	Division 2	Svealand	1st	Promotion Playoff – Not promoted
1968	Tier 2	Division 2	Svealand	5th	
1969	Tier 2	Division 2	Svealand	4th	
1970	Tier 2	Division 2	Svealand	3rd	
1971	Tier 2	Division 2	Svealand	8th	Relegated
1972	Tier 3	Division 3	Norra Svealand	1st	Promotion Playoff – Promoted
1973	Tier 2	Division 2	Norra	12th	Relegated
1974	Tier 3	Division 3	Norra Svealand	2nd	
1975	Tier 3	Division 3	Norra Svealand	2nd	
1976	Tier 3	Division 3	Västra Svealand	2nd	
1977	Tier 3	Division 3	Västra Svealand	1st	Promotion Playoff – Promoted
1978	Tier 2	Division 2	Norra	2nd	
1979	Tier 2	Division 2	Norra	1st	Promoted
1980	Tier 1	Allsvenskan		4th	
1981	Tier 1	Allsvenskan		4th	
1982	Tier 1	Allsvenskan		6th	
1983	Tier 1	Allsvenskan		9th	
1984	Tier 1	Allsvenskan		6th	
1985	Tier 1	Allsvenskan		9th	
1986	Tier 1	Allsvenskan		8th	
1987	Tier 1	Allsvenskan		5th	
1988	Tier 1	Allsvenskan		7th	
1989	Tier 1	Allsvenskan		10th	
1990	Tier 1	Allsvenskan		10th	Relegated
1991	Tier 2	Division 1	Norra	4th	
1992	Tier 2	Division 1	Östra	1st	Promotion Playoff – Promoted
1993	Tier 1	Allsvenskan		14th	Relegated
1994	Tier 2	Division 1	Norra	6th	
1995	Tier 2	Division 1	Norra	5th	
1996	Tier 2	Division 1	Norra	6th	
1997	Tier 2	Division 1	Norra	8th	
1998	Tier 2	Division 1	Norra	6th	
1999	Tier 2	Division 1	Norra	5th	
2000	Tier 2	Superettan		8th	
2001	Tier 2	Superettan		10th	
2002	Tier 2	Superettan		14th	Relegated
2003	Tier 3	Division 2	Västra Svealand	1st	Promoted
2004	Tier 2	Superettan		15th	Relegated
2005	Tier 3	Division 2	Norra Svealand	8th	
2006	Tier 4	Division 2	Norra Svealand	2nd	
2007	Tier 4	Division 2	Norra Svealand	1st	Promoted
2008	Tier 3	Division 1	Norra	11th	
2009	Tier 3	Division 1	Norra	2nd	Promotion Playoff – Promoted
2010	Tier 2	Superettan		11th	
2011	Tier 2	Superettan		14th	Relegation Playoff – Not relegated
2012	Tier 2	Superettan		10th	
2013	Tier 2	Superettan		16th	Relegated
2014	Tier 3	Division 1	Norra	4th	
2015	Tier 3	Division 1	Norra	7th	
2016	Tier 3	Division 1	Norra	4th	
2017	Tier 3	Division 1	Norra	1st	Promoted
2018	Tier 2	Superettan		6th	
2019	Tier 2	Superettan		3rd	Promotion Playoff – Not promoted
2020	Tier 2	Superettan		8th	
2021	Tier 2	Superettan		10th	
2022	Tier 2	Superettan		7th	
2023	Tier 2	Superettan		6th	
2024	Tier 2	Superettan		8th	
2025	Tier 2	Superettan		8th	

* League restructuring in 2000 resulted in a new division being created at Tier 2 and subsequent divisions dropping a level.

* League restructuring in 2006 resulted in a new division being created at Tier 3 and subsequent divisions dropping a level.

== Achievements ==
=== League ===
- Division 1 Norra:
  - Winners (1): 2017
  - Runners-up (1): 2009
- Division 1 Östra:
  - Winners (1): 1992
- Division 2 Norra:
  - Winners (6): 1933–34, 1934–35, 1936–37, 1941–42, 1942–43, 1979
  - Runners-up (4): 1930–31, 1932–33, 1935–36, 1978
- Division 2 Norra Svealand:
  - Winners (1): 2007
  - Runners-up (1):2006
- Division 2 Svealand:
  - Winners (3): 1955–56, 1965, 1967
- Division 2 Västra Svealand:
  - Winners (1): 2003
- Division 3 Norra:
  - Winners (1): 1948–49
- Division 3 Norra Svealand:
  - Winners (1): 1972
  - Runners-up (2):1974, 1975
- Division 3 Uppsvenska:
  - Winners (1): 1929–30
- Division 3 Västra Svealand:
  - Winners (1): 1977
  - Runners-up (1):1976

=== Cups ===
- Svenska Cupen:
  - Runners-up (1): 1979–80

== IK Brage in UEFA competitions ==
=== European games ===
Season	Competition	Round	Country	Club	Home	Away	Agg.	Notes
1982–83	UEFA Cup	First round	(Denmark)	Lyngby	2–2	2–1	4–3	
1982–83	UEFA Cup	Second round	(Germany)	Werder Bremen	2–6	0–2	2–8	
1988–89	UEFA Cup	First round	(Italy)	Internazionale	1–2	1–2	2–4	

== Footnotes ==
A Current youth players who at least have sat on the bench in a competitive match.
