= Håkan Sandberg =

Swedish academic

Håkan Sandberg is a Swedish academic, educationalist, and social researcher. His research in collaborative health is highly recognized and implemented; especially in the Swedish welfare sector.

== Career ==
Håkan Sandberg has undergraduate University studies in literature, Nordic languages, psychology, philosophy, and education from the Swedish universities in Uppsala, Linköping, Örebro and Malmö. He completed his Ph.D. in education at Uppsala University in 1995. Following his first focus of research, teamwork in child and youth psychiatry, he moved on to make team research and educational research as a senior fellow at Mälardalen University where he became an Associate Professor in Education in 2004. He is also a well-known author of textbooks in the area of teamwork as well as pedagogics. Håkan Sandberg has been a speaker at national and international conferences and has been a guest researcher at Stirling university.

=== Collaborative Health ===
The concept of collaborative health was developed in connection with team research by Sandberg, for the first time in a research report in Swedish 2004. Working life research had at the end of the 20th century made clear that working life conditions in the welfare sector affect peoples’ health (cf. concepts like psycho–social conditions, mobbing, burnout, fatigue, etc.).

Following his Ph.D. thesis regarding teamwork in childcare and youth psychiatry, Sandberg expanded his team research to the entire welfare sector. In this work, finding that teamwork consequences are not only about productivity and efficiency but also about the wellbeing of the team members, Sandberg combines collaboration and wellbeing in teamwork in terms of collaborative health thereby focusing the “teamwork trend” with its emphasis on intensive collaboration. Curious about the concept's position in an international context, Sandberg decided to publish articles about collaborative health in English, which in this context also was found to be an innovation (2010, 2013). In the overview of his own research and how the concept of collaborative health was found to be a relevant description of the individual's wellbeing and health in the intensive collaboration of teamwork, Sandberg defines collaborative health as : The physical, psychological, and social health resources the individual uses in teamwork and, at the same time, health resources are influenced by teamwork. Sandberg also concludes that collaborative health has a role to play in highlighting the new collaborative demands in the service sector and creates space for a new perspective in research based on this knowledge.

Sandberg has also published works in education, communication, health and social services. He recently also made a transition from being a university professor to dedicating more time to private research and consultations and publishing more of his ideas in both Swedish and English. Collaborative health has recently (2017) began to be spread as a tool in developmental projects concerning collaboration between authorities in the welfare sector in Sweden.

Trust in professional settings

Studying collaboration with a focus at teamwork has recently made Sandberg aware of the essential quality of trust as necessary for successful and mutual consequences of collaboration. Trust in the professional setting has a multifaced background in the original interpersonal trust created in the person during early stages of life, the trustfulness in the organisation och the way the professional trust his or her mission. A textbook is now under way, "Trust is everything" ("Tillit betyder allt").
