= Thomas Sunesson =

Swedish footballer

Personal information
- Full name: Thomas Sunesson
- Date of birth: 12 January 1959
- Place of birth: Mönsterås, Sweden
- Date of death: 24 October 2015 (aged 56)
- Height: 1.69 m (5 ft 6 1/2 in)
- Position: Forward

Youth career
- Mönsterås

Senior career*
Years	Team	Apps	(Gls)
1978–1982	Kalmar		
1983–1984	Malmö FF		
1984–1986	Lausanne Sport		
1986–1987	Djurgården	19	(4)
1988	Brommapojkarna		
1989	Hammarby	13	(4)
1989–1990	Beira-Mar	5	(0)
1990–1991	Seixal	11	(0)

International career
1983–1984	Sweden	12	(6)
- * Club domestic league appearances and goals

Thomas Sunesson (12 January 1959 – 24 October 2015) was a Swedish football player.

== Club career ==
Sunesson began his career with Kalmar FF. He joined Djurgårdens IF in 1986. He also had a brief spell with S.C. Beira-Mar in the Portuguese Liga.

== International career ==
Sunesson made 12 appearances for the Sweden men's national football team from 1983 to 1984, including two UEFA Euro 1984 qualifying matches.

== Personal life ==
He died on 24 October 2015.

== Career statistics ==
=== International ===
International goals

No.	Date	Venue	Opponent	Score	Result	Competition
1.	7 September 1983	Olympic Stadium, Helsinki, Finland	Finland	0–3	Won	1981–85 Nordic Football Championship
2.	15 October 1983	Stadio San Paolo, Naples, Italy	Italy	0–3	Won	UEFA Euro 1984 qualifying
3.	16 November 1983	Queen's Park Oval, Port of Spain, Trinidad & Tobago	Trinidad and Tobago	0–5	Won	Friendly
4.	23 February 1984	Tipshallen, Jönköping, Sweden	United States	4–0	Won	Friendly
5.	23 May 1984	Idrottsparken, Norrköping, Sweden	Malta	4–0	Won	1986 FIFA World Cup qualification
6.	23 May 1984	Idrottsparken, Norrköping, Sweden	Malta	4–0	Won	1986 FIFA World Cup qualification
Correct as of 26 October 2015
