= 2004 Malmö FF season =

Malmö FF
2004 season
- Chairman: Bengt Madsen
- Manager: Tom Prahl
- Stadium: Malmö Stadion
- Allsvenskan: 1st
- Svenska Cupen: Round 3
- UEFA Intertoto Cup: Round 1
- Top goalscorer: League: Afonso Alves (12); All: Afonso Alves (12)
Home colours	Away colours

Malmö FF won its first league title since 1988, thanks to smart spending of the 9 million € transfer money of Zlatan Ibrahimović three years earlier. Afonso Alves was the bearing player in the team, having signed from Örgryte IS for an estimated 1.2 million €. The title was won in front of 27 343 ecstatic supporters at Malmö Stadion. Malmö beat IF Elfsborg 1-0 thanks to Jon Inge Høiland scoring on a rebound, following Niklas Skoog's miss. Following a 2–1 victory at IFK Göteborg in front of almost 40 000 spectators earlier that week, IFK gave Malmö a helping hand by drawing against Halmstads BK 1–1 away from home, which proved crucial in securing Malmö's title. The club competed in Allsvenskan, Svenska Cupen and The UEFA Intertoto Cup for the 2004 season.

== Players ==
=== Squad stats ===
No.	Pos	Nat	Player	Total		Allsvenskan	
No.	Pos	Nat	Player	Apps	Goals	Apps	Goals
1	GK	(Sweden) SWE	Mattias Asper	26	0	26	0
3	DF	(Sweden) SWE	Olof Persson	23	1	23	1
4	DF	(Sweden) SWE	Daniel Majstorović	18	2	18	2
4	DF	(Sweden) SWE	Peter Abelsson	8	2	8	2
5	MF	(Sweden) SWE	Thomas Olsson	20	1	20	1
6	MF	(Sweden) SWE	Hasse Mattisson	16	0	16	0
7	DF	(Cameroon) CMR	Joseph Elanga	25	1	25	1
8	FW	(Brazil) BRA	Afonso Alves	24	12	24	12
9	FW	(Sweden) SWE	Niklas Skoog	25	8	25	8
10	MF	(Sweden) SWE	Louay Chanko	26	0	26	0
11	FW	(Poland) POL	Igor Sypniewski	10	2	10	2
11	MF	(Sweden) SWE	Yksel Osmanovski	6	0	6	0
13	DF	(Sweden) SWE	Jon Jönsson	21	3	21	3
14	DF	(Norway) NOR	Jon Inge Høiland	25	4	25	4
18	DF	(Sweden) SWE	Patrik Andersson	10	1	10	1
19	MF	(Sweden) SWE	Glenn Holgersson	6	0	6	0
20	DF	(Sweden) SWE	Johan Nilsson-Guiomar	3	0	3	0
21	FW	(Sweden) SWE	Andreas Yngvesson	24	5	24	5
22	MF	(Sweden) SWE	Tobias Grahn	13	2	13	2
25	DF	(Sweden) SWE	Behrang Safari	3	0	3	0
26	FW	(Sweden) SWE	Darko Lukanović	4	0	4	0
30	MF	(Sweden) SWE	Daniel Andersson	11	0	11	0

== Club ==
=== Kit ===
Supplier: Puma
Sponsor(s): Nätverket

Home; Domestic	Away; Domestic

Source: Malmö FF

=== Other information ===
Chairman	(Sweden) Bengt Madsen
Ground (capacity and dimensions)	Malmö Stadion (27,500 / )

Updated to match played 19 October
Source: Malmö FF and Malmö Stadion

== Competitions ==
=== Allsvenskan ===
==== League table ====
Pos	Team	Pld	W	D	L	GF	GA	GD	Pts	Qualification or relegation
1	Malmö FF (C)	26	15	7	4	44	21	+23	52	Qualification to Champions League second qualifying round
2	Halmstads BK	26	14	8	4	53	27	+26	50	Qualification to UEFA Cup second qualifying round
3	IFK Göteborg	26	14	5	7	33	20	+13	47	Qualification to Intertoto Cup first round
4	Djurgårdens IF	26	11	8	7	38	32	+6	41	Qualification to UEFA Cup second qualifying round (Note: Djurgården qualified for the UEFA Cup as Svenska Cupen champions 2004.)
5	Kalmar FF	26	10	10	6	27	18	+9	40	

Source: svenskfotboll.se (in Swedish)
Rules for classification: 1) points; 2) goal difference; 3) number of goals scored.
(C) Champions

==== Results summary ====
Overall								Home						Away					
Pld	W	D	L	GF	GA	GD	Pts	W	D	L	GF	GA	GD	W	D	L	GF	GA	GD
26	15	7	4	44	21	+23	52	8	4	1	21	9	+12	7	3	3	23	12	+11

Source: svenskfotboll.se

==== Matches ====
6 April 2004 Round 1	Hammarby IF	0 – 0	Malmö FF	Stockholm
				Stadium: Söderstadion; Attendance: 15,626

9 April 2004 Round 2	Malmö FF	5 – 1	Örebro SK	Malmö
	Skoog 15'; Høiland 27'; Grahn 34'; Sypniewski 62, 74'		Furuseth Olsen 36'	Stadium: Malmö Stadion; Attendance: 22,019

19 April 2004 Round 3	IF Elfsborg	1 – 5	Malmö FF	Borås
	Nilsson 14'		Alves 29, 32, 78'; Majstorović 37'; P. Andersson 82'	Stadium: Ryavallen; Attendance: 7,593

24 April 2004 Round 4	Malmö FF	1 – 0	IFK Göteborg	Malmö
	Grahn 39'			Stadium: Malmö Stadion; Attendance: 26,426

3 May 2004 Round 5	Trelleborgs FF	1 – 1	Malmö FF	Trelleborg
	Haynes 7'		Jönsson 22'	Stadium: Vångavallen; Attendance: 9,843

6 May 2004 Round 6	Malmö FF	0 – 0	AIK	Malmö
				Stadium: Malmö Stadion; Attendance: 21,229

12 May 2004 Round 7	Landskrona BoIS	2 – 1	Malmö FF	Landskrona
	Kusi-Asare 17'; J. Andersson 63'		Persson 75'	Stadium: Landskrona IP; Attendance: 8,495

17 May 2004 Round 8	Malmö FF	0 – 0	Kalmar FF	Malmö
				Stadium: Malmö Stadion; Attendance: 17,332

24 May 2004 Round 9	Helsingborgs IF	0 – 2	Malmö FF	Helsingborg
			Yngvesson 56'; Alves 89'	Stadium: Olympia; Attendance: 16,069

30 June 2004 Round 13	Malmö FF	1 – 0	Örgryte IS	Malmö
	Yngvesson 72'			Stadium: Malmö Stadion; Attendance: 11,940

7 July 2004 Round 10	Malmö FF	0 – 0	GIF Sundsvall	Malmö
				Stadium: Malmö Stadion; Attendance: 14,134

14 July 2004 Round 11	Djurgårdens IF	0 – 2	Malmö FF	Solna
			Høiland 11'; Alves 78'	Stadium: Råsunda; Attendance: 13,380

21 July 2004 Round 12	Malmö FF	2 – 1	Halmstads BK	Malmö
	Alves 4'; Jönsson 63'		Preko 15'	Stadium: Malmö Stadion; Attendance: 20,781

1 August 2004 Round 14	AIK	0 – 2	Malmö FF	Solna
			Skoog 40, 90 + 4'	Stadium: Råsunda; Attendance: 15,254

9 August 2004 Round 15	Malmö FF	4 – 2	Trelleborgs FF	Malmö
	Skoog 3, 90 + 2'; Elanga 66'; Jönsson 90'		Redo 33'; Ademolu 80'	Stadium: Malmö Stadion; Attendance: 19,328

14 August 2004 Round 16	GIF Sundsvall	3 – 2	Malmö FF	Sundsvall
	Bergersen 43'; Ljungberg 50'; Dahlberg 69'		Majstorović 7'; Skoog 58'	Stadium: Idrottsparken; Attendance: 6,432

24 August 2004 Round 17	Malmö FF	1 – 1	Helsingborgs IF	Malmö
	Alves 36'		G. Andersson 66'	Stadium: Malmö Stadion; Attendance: 22,920

30 August 2004 Round 18	Örgryte IS	0 – 2	Malmö FF	Gothenburg
			Alves 20'; Yngvesson 48'	Stadium: Gamla Ullevi; Attendance: 4,482

14 September 2004 Round 19	Halmstads BK	2 – 2	Malmö FF	Halmstad
	Rosenberg 16, 30'		Abelsson 61'; Alves 81'	Stadium: Örjans Vall; Attendance: 11,239

20 September 2004 Round 20	Malmö FF	2 – 0	Djurgårdens IF	Malmö
	Yngvesson 32'; Høiland 71'			Stadium: Malmö Stadion; Attendance: 18,218

23 September 2004 Round 21	Örebro SK	1 – 2	Malmö FF	Örebro
	Kuhi 85'		Skoog 52'; Alves 68'	Stadium: Eyravallen; Attendance: 6,629

26 September 2004 Round 22	Malmö FF	4 – 3	Hammarby IF	Malmö
	Alves 13, 79'; Skoog 32'; Yngvesson 43'		Laitinen 9'; Abelsson 52' (o.g.); E. Johansson 58'	Stadium: Malmö Stadion; Attendance: 20,302

3 October 2004 Round 23	Kalmar FF	1 – 0	Malmö FF	Kalmar
	Fábio Augusto 36'			Stadium: Fredriksskans; Attendance: 8,758

18 October 2004 Round 24	Malmö FF	0 – 1	Landskrona BoIS	Malmö
			H. Nilsson 16' (pen.)	Stadium: Malmö Stadion; Attendance: 18,824

25 October 2004 Round 25	IFK Göteborg	1 – 2	Malmö FF	Gothenburg
	Ijeh 60'		Abelsson 17'; Olsson 34'	Stadium: Ullevi; Attendance: 38,983

30 October 2004 Round 26	Malmö FF	1 – 0	IF Elfsborg	Malmö
	Høiland 54'			Stadium: Malmö Stadion; Attendance: 27,343

=== Svenska Cupen ===
Kickoff times are in UTC+2.

29 April 2004 Round 2	Ystads IF	1 – 4	Malmö FF	Ystad
			Holgersson; Sypniewski; Grahn; Høiland	Attendance: 2,012

20 May 2004 Round 3	Örebro SK	2 – 1	Malmö FF	Örebro
			Skoog	Stadium: Eyravallen; Attendance: 3,586
