= 2005 Malmö FF season =

Malmö FF
2005 season
- Chairman: Bengt Madsen
- Manager: Tom Prahl
- Stadium: Malmö Stadion
- Allsvenskan: 5th
- Svenska Cupen: Round 4
- UEFA Champions League: Qualification Round 3
- UEFA Cup: Round 1
- Top goalscorer: Afonso Alves (14)
Home colours	Away colours

Malmö FF competed in Allsvenskan, Svenska Cupen, qualification for The UEFA Champions League and The UEFA Cup for the 2005 season.

== Players ==
=== Squad stats ===
No.	Pos	Nat	Player	Total		Allsvenskan	
No.	Pos	Nat	Player	Apps	Goals	Apps	Goals
1	GK	(Sweden) SWE	Mattias Asper	26	0	26	0
2	MF	(Sweden) SWE	Anders Andersson	11	0	11	0
3	DF	(Sweden) SWE	Olof Persson	24	0	24	0
4	DF	(Sweden) SWE	Peter Abelsson	22	1	22	1
5	MF	(Sweden) SWE	Thomas Olsson	19	1	19	1
6	MF	(Sweden) SWE	Hasse Mattisson	19	2	19	2
7	DF	(Cameroon) CMR	Joseph Elanga	26	0	26	0
8	FW	(Brazil) BRA	Afonso Alves	24	14	24	14
9	FW	(Sweden) SWE	Niklas Skoog	4	1	4	1
10	MF	(Sweden) SWE	Louay Chanko	13	0	13	0
11	MF	(Sweden) SWE	Yksel Osmanovski	21	4	21	4
14	DF	(Norway) NOR	Jon Inge Høiland	23	2	23	2
15	MF	(Sierra Leone) SLE	Samuel Barlay	4	0	4	0
17	MF	(Sweden) SWE	Joakim Nilsson	1	0	1	0
18	DF	(Sweden) SWE	Patrik Andersson	9	0	9	0
18	FW	(Nigeria) NGA	Edward Ofere	6	1	6	1
19	MF	(Sweden) SWE	Glenn Holgersson	7	1	7	1
21	FW	(Sweden) SWE	Andreas Yngvesson	10	0	10	0
21	DF	(Ivory Coast) CIV	Raoul Kouakou	4	1	4	1
22	FW	(Denmark) DEN	Jesper Bech	13	1	13	1
23	FW	(Sweden) SWE	Marcus Rosenberg	12	4	12	4
23	FW	(Finland) FIN	Jari Litmanen	2	1	2	1
25	DF	(Sweden) SWE	Behrang Safari	3	0	3	0
26	FW	(Sweden) SWE	Marcus Pode	15	2	15	2
27	FW	(Sweden) SWE	Daniel Sliper	1	0	1	0
28	FW	(Sweden) SWE	Rawez Lawan	5	0	5	0
30	MF	(Sweden) SWE	Daniel Andersson	25	2	25	2

== Competitions ==
=== Allsvenskan ===
==== League table ====
Pos	Team	Pld	W	D	L	GF	GA	GD	Pts	Qualification or relegation
3	Kalmar FF	26	11	10	5	36	21	+15	43	Qualification to Intertoto Cup first round
4	Hammarby IF	26	12	7	7	43	30	+13	43	
5	Malmö FF	26	12	5	9	38	27	+11	41	
6	Helsingborgs IF	26	12	3	11	32	38	−6	39	
7	IF Elfsborg	26	10	7	9	35	43	−8	37	

Source: svenskfotboll.se (in Swedish)
Rules for classification: 1) points; 2) goal difference; 3) number of goals scored.

==== Matches ====
10 April 2005 Round 1	Malmö FF	1 – 2	IFK Göteborg	Malmö
15:00	Alves 35'	(Report)	Selaković 16'; Mild 58'	Stadium: Malmö Stadion; Attendance: 26,504; Referee: Peter Fröjdfeldt

17 April 2005 Round 2	Landskrona BoIS	0 – 1	Malmö FF	Landskrona
15:00		(Report)	Rosenberg 10'	Stadium: Landskrona IP; Attendance: 9,649; Referee: Jonas Eriksson

24 April 2005 Round 3	Malmö FF	3 – 0	Gefle IF	Malmö
15:00	Høiland 13'; Skoog 37'; Olsson 90'	(Report)		Stadium: Malmö Stadion; Attendance: 13,489; Referee: Martin Hansson

3 May 2005 Round 4	Hammarby IF	1 – 1	Malmö FF	Stockholm
19:00	Aubynn 48'	(Report)	Osmanovski 26'	Stadium: Söderstadion; Attendance: 12,388; Referee: Martin Hansson

8 May 2005 Round 5	Assyriska FF	0 – 2	Malmö FF	Solna
17:00		(Report)	Alves 18, 50'	Stadium: Råsunda; Attendance: 2,746; Referee: Stefan Johannesson

16 May 2005 Round 6	Malmö FF	1 – 0	Kalmar FF	Malmö
19:00	Alves 37'	(Report)		Stadium: Malmö Stadion; Attendance: 16,085; Referee: Peter Fröjdfeldt

22 May 2005 Round 7	GIF Sundsvall	2 – 0	Malmö FF	Sundsvall
17:00	Hermansson 55, 59'	(Report)		Stadium: Norrporten Arena; Attendance: 5,857; Referee: Miro Ukalovic

29 May 2005 Round 8	Malmö FF	1 – 0	Örgryte IS	Malmö
17:00	Alves 56'	(Report)		Stadium: Malmö Stadion; Attendance: 15,546; Referee: Stefan Johannesson

13 June 2005 Round 9	Helsingborgs IF	0 – 1	Malmö FF	Helsingborg
20:00		(Report)	Alves 35'	Stadium: Olympia; Attendance: 16,495; Referee: Leif Sundell

16 June 2005 Round 10	Malmö FF	1 – 3	Djurgårdens IF	Malmö
20:00	Rosenberg 36'	(Report)	Kusi-Asare 58'; Larsen 85'; Sjölund 89'	Stadium: Malmö Stadion; Attendance: 20,135; Referee: Miro Ukalovic

20 June 2005 Round 11	IF Elfsborg	3 – 1	Malmö FF	Borås
19:00	Berggren 5, 89'; Sjöhage 63'	(Report)	Rosenberg 9'	Stadium: Borås Arena; Attendance: 9,304; Referee: Jonas Eriksson

27 June 2005 Round 12	Malmö FF	2 – 1	BK Häcken	Malmö
19:00	Rosenberg 21'; Alves 69'	(Report)	Henriksson 90'	Stadium: Malmö Stadion; Attendance: 15,585; Referee: Stefan Johannesson

4 July 2005 Round 13	Halmstads BK	0 – 0	Malmö FF	Halmstad
19:00		(Report)		Stadium: Örjans Vall; Attendance: 11,355; Referee: Jonas Eriksson

17 July 2005 Round 14	Malmö FF	2 – 1	Halmstads BK	Malmö
	Mattisson 8, 52'		Thorvaldsson 46'	Stadium: Malmö Stadion; Attendance: 17,804

21 July 2005 Round 15	BK Häcken	1 – 0	Malmö FF	Gothenburg
	Williams 84'			Stadium: Ullevi; Attendance: 14,803

30 July 2005 Round 16	Malmö FF	1 – 1	IF Elfsborg	Malmö
	Alves 51'		Klarström 74'	Stadium: Malmö Stadion; Attendance: 13,044

6 August 2005 Round 17	Kalmar FF	0 – 2	Malmö FF	Kalmar
			Osmanovski 50'; Alves 73'	Stadium: Fredriksskans; Attendance: 6,542

14 August 2005 Round 18	Malmö FF	2 – 2	Assyriska FF	Malmö
	Litmanen 55'; Alves 59'		Samura 10'; Nordbeck 70'	Stadium: Malmö Stadion; Attendance: 12,862

20 August 2005 Round 19	Örgryte IS	1 – 1	Malmö FF	Gothenburg
	Aílton 52'		Osmanovski 88'	Stadium: Gamla Ullevi; Attendance: 4,072

28 August 2005 Round 20	Malmö FF	6 – 2	GIF Sundsvall	Malmö
	Alves 39, 57'; Pode 68'; Abelsson 73'; Høiland 84'; Holgersson 86'		Olofsson 44'; Gerba 50'	Stadium: Malmö Stadion; Attendance: 9,530

12 September 2005 Round 21	Djurgårdens IF	2 – 0	Malmö FF	Stockholm
	Jonson 12'; Stenman 29'			Stadium: Stockholms Stadion; Attendance: 14,181

20 September 2005 Round 22	Malmö FF	2 – 0	Helsingborgs IF	Malmö
	D. Andersson 72'; Osmanovski 90'			Stadium: Malmö Stadion; Attendance: 20,346

26 September 2005 Round 23	IFK Göteborg	2 – 1	Malmö FF	Gothenburg
	Berg 50'; Alexandersson 66'		Alves 61'	Stadium: Ullevi; Attendance: 15,253

3 October 2005 Round 24	Malmö FF	5 – 0	Landskrona BoIS	Malmö
	D. Andersson 23'; Bech 50'; Ofere 80'; Kouakou 84'; Alves 88'			Stadium: Malmö Stadion; Attendance: 12,521

16 October 2005 Round 25	Gefle IF	2 – 1	Malmö FF	Gävle
	Ytterbom 61'; Makondele 65'		Pode 13'	Stadium: Strömvallen; Attendance: 5,583

23 October 2005 Round 26	Malmö FF	0 – 1	Hammarby IF	Malmö
			Furuseth Olsen 26'	Stadium: Malmö Stadion; Attendance: 14,052

=== Svenska Cupen ===
20 April 2005	Vallentuna BK	1 – 3	Malmö FF	Vallentuna
19:00	Lundkvist 72'	(Report)	Lawan 63'; Chanko 66'; Yngvesson 80'	Stadium: Vallentuna IP; Attendance: 1,200; Referee: Markus Strömbergsson

19 May 2005	Landskrona BoIS	1 – 3	Malmö FF	Landskrona
19:00	Okkonen 65'	(Report)	Osmanovski 33'; Lawan 52'; Rosenberg 62'	Stadium: Landskrona IP; Attendance: 2,507; Referee: Leif Sundell

30 June 2005	BK Häcken	0 – 0 (a.e.t.) (4 – 3 p)	Malmö FF	Gothenburg
19:00		(Report)		Stadium: Rambergsvallen; Attendance: 1,061
	Penalties
	Tøfting (penalty scored); Kapella-Karlsson (penalty scored); Dybendal (penalty scored) unknown player (penalty missed); Henriksson (penalty scored)		Osmanovski (penalty missed); D. Andersson (penalty scored); Mattisson (penalty scored); Afonso (penalty scored)

=== UEFA Champions League ===
==== Qualifying phase ====
===== Second qualifying round =====
27 July 2005 First Leg	Malmö FF (Sweden)	3 – 2	(Israel) Maccabi Haifa	Malmö
20:00	Osmanovski 33'; D. Andersson 42' (pen.); Mattisson 68'	(Report)	Harazi 2'; Colautti 44'	Stadium: Malmö Stadion; Attendance: 10,960; Referee: Julian Rodriguez Santiago

3 August 2005 Second Leg	Maccabi Haifa (Israel)	2 – 2 (4 – 5 agg.)	(Sweden) Malmö FF	Tel Aviv, Israel
18:00	Colautti 10'; Arbeitman 60'	(Report)	Afonso 21'; Abelsson 89'	Stadium: Bloomfield Stadium; Referee: Alexandru Dan Tudor

===== Third qualifying round =====
10 August 2005 First Leg	Malmö FF (Sweden)	0 – 1	(Switzerland) Thun	Malmö
18:45		(Report)	Pimenta 34'	Stadium: Malmö Stadion; Attendance: 12,237; Referee: Arturo Dauden Ibañez

23 August 2005 Second Leg	Thun (Switzerland)	3 – 0 (4 – 0 agg.)	(Sweden) Malmö FF	Bern, Switzerland
20:15	Bernardini 26'; Lustrinelli 40' (66)	(Report)		Stadium: Stade de Suisse Wankdorf; Attendance: 31,000

== Club ==
=== Kit ===
Supplier: Puma
Sponsor(s): Nätverket

Home; Domestic	Away; Domestic

Source: Malmö FF

=== Other information ===
Chairman	(Sweden) Bengt Madsen
Ground (capacity and dimensions)	Malmö Stadion (27,500 / )

Updated to match played 19 October
Source: Malmö FF and Malmö Stadion
