= 2003 Malmö FF season =

Malmö FF
2003 season
- Chairman: Bengt Madsen
- Manager: Tom Prahl
- Stadium: Malmö Stadion
- Allsvenskan: 3rd
- Svenska Cupen: Round 4
- UEFA Cup: Round 1
- Top goalscorer: Niklas Skoog (22)
| Home colours | Away colours |

Malmö FF competed in Allsvenskan, Svenska Cupen and The UEFA Cup for the 2003 season.

== Players ==
=== Squad stats ===
| No. | Pos | Nat | Player | Total | | Allsvenskan | |
| No. | Pos | Nat | Player | Apps | Goals | Apps | Goals |
|---|---|---|---|---|---|---|---|
| 1 | GK | (Sweden) SWE | Lee Baxter | 3 | 0 | 3 | 0 |
| 2 | DF | (Sweden) SWE | Jörgen Ohlsson | 1 | 0 | 1 | 0 |
| 3 | DF | (Sweden) SWE | Olof Persson | 23 | 2 | 23 | 2 |
| 4 | DF | (Sweden) SWE | Daniel Majstorović | 21 | 0 | 21 | 0 |
| 5 | MF | (Sweden) SWE | Thomas Olsson | 14 | 1 | 14 | 1 |
| 6 | MF | (Sweden) SWE | Hasse Mattisson | 23 | 0 | 23 | 0 |
| 7 | DF | (Cameroon) CMR | Joseph Elanga | 23 | 0 | 23 | 0 |
| 8 | MF | (Sweden) SWE | Kristian Bergström | 14 | 1 | 14 | 1 |
| 9 | FW | (Sweden) SWE | Niklas Skoog | 23 | 22 | 23 | 22 |
| 10 | MF | (Sweden) SWE | Louay Chanko | 21 | 2 | 21 | 2 |
| 11 | MF | (Sweden) SWE | Erik Johansson | 17 | 2 | 17 | 2 |
| 13 | DF | (Sweden) SWE | Jon Jönsson | 18 | 0 | 18 | 0 |
| 14 | DF | (Norway) NOR | Jon Inge Høiland | 26 | 2 | 26 | 2 |
| 15 | DF | (Sweden) SWE | Matias Concha | 18 | 0 | 18 | 0 |
| 17 | FW | (Sweden) SWE | Markus Rosenberg | 16 | 3 | 16 | 3 |
| 18 | FW | (Nigeria) NGA | Peter Ijeh | 17 | 10 | 17 | 10 |
| 19 | DF | (Denmark) DEN | Jeppe Vestergaard | 1 | 0 | 1 | 0 |
| 20 | DF | (Finland) FIN | Jussi Nuorela | 7 | 0 | 7 | 0 |
| 21 | FW | (Sweden) SWE | Andreas Yngvesson | 24 | 4 | 24 | 4 |
| 22 | MF | (Sweden) SWE | Tobias Grahn | 8 | 1 | 8 | 1 |
| 25 | DF | (Sweden) SWE | Thommie Persson | 1 | 0 | 1 | 0 |
| 33 | GK | (Sweden) SWE | Mattias Asper | 23 | 0 | 23 | 0 |
| 25 | MF | (Sweden) SWE | Joakim Nilsson | 2 | 0 | 2 | 0 |

== Competitions ==
=== Allsvenskan ===
==== League table ====
| Pos | Team | Pld | W | D | L | GF | GA | GD | Pts | Qualification or relegation |
|---|---|---|---|---|---|---|---|---|---|---|
| 1 | Djurgårdens IF (C) | 26 | 19 | 1 | 6 | 62 | 26 | +36 | 58 | Qualification to Champions League second qualifying round |
| 2 | Hammarby IF | 26 | 15 | 6 | 5 | 50 | 30 | +20 | 51 | Qualification to UEFA Cup second qualifying round |
| 3 | Malmö FF | 26 | 14 | 6 | 6 | 50 | 23 | +27 | 48 | Qualification to Intertoto Cup first round |
| 4 | Örgryte IS | 26 | 14 | 3 | 9 | 42 | 40 | +2 | 45 | |
| 5 | AIK | 26 | 11 | 6 | 9 | 39 | 34 | +5 | 39 | |

Source: svenskfotboll.se (in Swedish)
Rules for classification: 1) points; 2) goal difference; 3) number of goals scored.
(C) Champions

==== Matches ====
| 7 April 2003 Round 1 | Malmö FF | 2 – 0 | Örebro SK | Malmö |
| 19:00 | Chanko 27'; Rosenberg 64' | | | Stadium: Malmö Stadion; Attendance: 16,768 |

| 14 April 2003 Round 2 | IFK Göteborg | 3 – 0 | Malmö FF | Gothenburg |
| 19:00 | Blomqvist 53, 59'; Ericsson 70' | | | Stadium: Gamla Ullevi; Attendance: 11,906 |

| 21 April 2003 Round 3 | Malmö FF | 2 – 2 | Landskrona BoIS | Malmö |
| 15:00 | Skoog 37' (pen.), 42' (pen.) | | Farnerud 48'; H. Nilsson 71' | Stadium: Malmö Stadion; Attendance: 23,081 |

| 27 April 2003 Round 4 | GIF Sundsvall | 1 – 1 | Malmö FF | Sundsvall |
| 17:30 | Svenning 4' | | Høiland 61' | Stadium: Idrottsparken; Attendance: 5,106 |

| 5 May 2003 Round 5 | Hammarby IF | 2 – 1 | Malmö FF | Stockholm |
| 19:00 | Kennedy 49' (pen.), 67' (pen.) | | Rosenberg 19' | Stadium: Söderstadion; Attendance: 10,754 |

| 13 May 2003 Round 6 | Malmö FF | 1 – 1 | Örgryte IS | Malmö |
| | Yngvesson 26' | | Afonso 5' | Stadium: Malmö Stadion; Attendance: 12,238 |

| 18 May 2003 Round 7 | Malmö FF | 4 – 0 | Enköpings SK | Malmö |
| 19:00 | Skoog 23, 86'; E. Johansson 50'; Høiland 65' | | | Stadium: Malmö Stadion; Attendance: 10,462 |

| 26 May 2003 Round 8 | AIK | 2 – 0 | Malmö FF | Solna |
| 19:00 | Ishizaki 56'; Rubarth 64' | | | Stadium: Råsunda; Attendance: 22,017 |

| 2 June 2003 Round 9 | Östers IF | 0 – 2 | Malmö FF | Växjö |
| 19:00 | | | Skoog 41'; Bergström 51' | Stadium: Värendsvallen; Attendance: 7,538 |

| 17 June 2003 Round 10 | Malmö FF | 2 – 1 | Halmstads BK | Malmö |
| 19:00 | Ijeh 62'; Skoog 81' | | M. Nilsson 10' | Stadium: Malmö Stadion; Attendance: 16,632 |

| 23 June 2003 Round 11 | Djurgårdens IF | 0 – 2 | Malmö FF | Stockholm |
| 20:00 | | | Skoog 7'; Ijeh 56' | Stadium: Stockholms Stadion; Attendance: 13,948 |

| 30 June 2003 Round 12 | Malmö FF | 5 – 0 | Helsingborgs IF | Malmö |
| 19:00 | Yngvesson 13, 76'; Skoog 38, 43, 90' | | | Stadium: Malmö Stadion; Attendance: 27,477 |

| 7 July 2003 Round 13 | IF Elfsborg | 1 – 2 | Malmö FF | Borås |
| 19:00 | Berggren 89' | | Ijeh 3'; Skoog 77' | Stadium: Ryavallen; Attendance: 9,899 |

| 21 July 2003 Round 14 | Malmö FF | 0 – 0 | IF Elfsborg | Malmö |
| 19:00 | | | | Stadium: Malmö Stadion; Attendance: 18,327 |

| 28 July 2003 Round 15 | Malmö FF | 2 – 2 | GIF Sundsvall | Malmö |
| 19:00 | Skoog 47, 67' | | Wallerstedt 39'; Bergersen 77' | Stadium: Malmö Stadion; Attendance: 15,619 |

| 4 August 2003 Round 16 | Landskrona BoIS | 1 – 0 | Malmö FF | Landskrona |
| 19:00 | Kusi-Asare 68' | | | Stadium: Landskrona IP; Attendance: 11,375 |

| 10 August 2003 Round 17 | Örgryte IS | 0 – 4 | Malmö FF | Gothenburg |
| 17:00 | | | Ijeh 4, 18, 42'; Chanko 71' | Stadium: Gamla Ullevi |

| 17 August 2003 Round 18 | Malmö FF | 6 – 0 | Hammarby IF | Malmö |
| 17:00 | E. Johansson 25'; Grahn 36'; Skoog 79, 83, 90'; Rosenberg 85' | | | Stadium: Malmö Stadion; Attendance: 21,374 |

| 24 August 2003 Round 19 | Halmstads BK | 0 – 4 | Malmö FF | Halmstad |
| 17:00 | | | Ijeh 1'; Skoog 38, 67'; Bergström 90 + 1' | Stadium: Örjans Vall; Attendance: 10,060 |

| 1 September 2003 Round 20 | Malmö FF | 3 – 2 | Östers IF | Malmö |
| 19:00 | Ijeh 14, 32'; Olsson 18' | | Hamzo 10'; Ottosson 21' | Stadium: Malmö Stadion; Attendance: 17,528 |

| 15 September 2003 Round 21 | Helsingborgs IF | 0 – 0 | Malmö FF | Helsingborg |
| 19:00 | | | | Stadium: Olympia; Attendance: 15,460 |

| 21 September 2003 Round 22 | Malmö FF | 2 – 1 | Djurgårdens IF | Malmö |
| 17:00 | Skoog 24', 53' (pen.) | | Bapupa 81' | Stadium: Malmö Stadion; Attendance: 26,812 |

| 28 September 2003 Round 23 | Malmö FF | 3 – 0 | AIK | Malmö |
| 17:00 | Persson 45'; Skoog 48' (pen.), 66' (pen.) | | | Stadium: Malmö Stadion; Attendance: 19,061 |

| 5 October 2003 Round 24 | Enköpings SK | 0 – 1 | Malmö FF | Enköping |
| 15:00 | | | Persson 33' | Stadium: Enavallen; Attendance: 4,004 |

| 19 October 2003 Round 25 | Malmö FF | 1 – 3 | IFK Göteborg | Malmö |
| | Ijeh 47' | | Henriksson 31, 49'; Ericsson 44' | Stadium: Malmö Stadion; Attendance: 17,923 |

| 26 October 2003 Round 26 | Örebro SK | 1 – 0 | Malmö FF | Örebro |
| 14:00 | Nordback 78' | | | Stadium: Behrn Arena; Attendance: 6,530 |

== Club ==
=== Kit ===
Supplier: Puma
Sponsor(s): Nätverket

| Home; Domestic | Away; Domestic |

Source: Malmö FF

=== Other information ===
| Chairman | (Sweden) Bengt Madsen |
| Ground (capacity and dimensions) | Malmö Stadion (27,500 / ) |

Updated to match played 19 October
Source: Malmö FF and Malmö Stadion
