= 2006 Malmö FF season =

Malmö FF
2006 season
- Chairman: Bengt Madsen
- Manager: Sören Åkeby
- Stadium: Malmö Stadion
- Allsvenskan: 7th
- Svenska Cupen: Round 3
- Top goalscorer: Jonatan Johansson (11)
Home colours	Away colours

Malmö FF competed in Allsvenskan and Svenska Cupen for the 2006 season.

== Players ==
=== Squad stats ===
No.	Pos	Nat	Player	Total		Allsvenskan	
No.	Pos	Nat	Player	Apps	Goals	Apps	Goals
1	GK	(Sweden) SWE	Mattias Asper	9	0	9	0
1	GK	(Sweden) SWE	Håkan Svensson	3	0	3	0
2	DF	(Denmark) DEN	Ulrich Vinzents	26	0	26	0
3	DF	(Sweden) SWE	Olof Persson	22	0	22	0
4	DF	(Norway) NOR	Jon Inge Høiland	2	0	2	0
5	DF	(Brazil) BRA	Gabriel	16	0	16	0
6	MF	(Sweden) SWE	Hasse Mattisson	5	0	5	0
7	MF	(Sweden) SWE	Anders Andersson	20	0	20	0
8	FW	(Brazil) BRA	Afonso Alves	7	3	7	3
8	FW	(Brazil) BRA	Júnior	17	8	17	8
9	FW	(Sweden) SWE	Niklas Skoog	2	0	2	0
10	FW	(Finland) FIN	Jari Litmanen	8	2	8	2
11	MF	(Sweden) SWE	Yksel Osmanovski	18	1	18	1
13	DF	(Sweden) SWE	Jon Jönsson	6	0	6	0
14	MF	(Iceland) ISL	Emil Hallfreðsson	19	5	19	5
16	DF	(Sweden) SWE	Christian Järdler	13	0	13	0
17	MF	(Sweden) SWE	Joakim Nilsson	23	0	23	0
18	FW	(Nigeria) NGA	Edward Ofere	9	2	9	2
19	MF	(Sweden) SWE	Glenn Holgersson	6	0	6	0
21	DF	(Ivory Coast) CIV	Raoul Kouakou	2	0	2	0
22	FW	(Denmark) DEN	Jesper Bech	11	0	11	0
23	MF	(Sweden) SWE	Labinot Harbuzi	6	0	6	0
25	DF	(Sweden) SWE	Behrang Safari	18	2	18	2
26	FW	(Sweden) SWE	Marcus Pode	20	6	20	6
27	DF	(Sweden) SWE	Anes Mravac	5	0	5	0
28	FW	(Sweden) SWE	Rawez Lawan	2	0	2	0
30	MF	(Sweden) SWE	Daniel Andersson	25	3	25	3
31	FW	(Finland) FIN	Jonatan Johansson	14	11	14	11
34	MF	(Sweden) SWE	Guillermo Molins	5	0	5	0
35	GK	(Sweden) SWE	Jonas Sandqvist	17	0	17	0

== Competitions ==
=== Allsvenskan ===
==== League table ====
Pos	Team	Pld	W	D	L	GF	GA	GD	Pts
5	Kalmar FF	26	12	5	9	39	30	+9	41
6	Djurgårdens IF	26	11	7	8	31	25	+6	40
7	Malmö FF	26	10	8	8	43	39	+4	38
8	IFK Göteborg	26	9	9	8	39	36	+3	36
9	Gefle IF	26	8	7	11	28	39	−11	31

Source: svenskfotboll.se (in Swedish)
Rules for classification: 1) points; 2) goal difference; 3) number of goals scored.

==== Matches ====
3 April 2006 Round 1	Malmö FF	1–1	BK Häcken	Malmö
	Alves 59'		Lučić 6'	Stadium: Malmö Stadion

10 April 2006 Round 2	Örgryte IS	1–2	Malmö FF	Gothenburg
	Toivonen 6'		Alves 9'; Safari 44'	Stadium: Gamla Ullevi

17 April 2006 Round 3	Malmö FF	1–2	Hammarby IF	Malmö
	Ofere 72'		Kouakou 24' (o.g.); Paulinho 62'	Stadium: Malmö Stadion

23 April 2006 Round 4	GAIS	0–0	Malmö FF	Gothenburg
				Stadium: Gamla Ullevi

26 April 2006 Round 5	Kalmar FF	0–0	Malmö FF	Kalmar
				Stadium: Fredriksskans

3 May 2006 Round 6	Malmö FF	1–0	Halmstads BK	Malmö
	Litmanen 90' (pen.)			Stadium: Malmö Stadion

8 May 2006 Round 7	Malmö FF	3–1	Helsingborgs IF	Malmö
	Ofere 19'; Alves 78'; Pode 88'		Stefanidis 52'	Stadium: Malmö Stadion

11 May 2006 Round 8	Djurgårdens IF	2–3	Malmö FF	Stockholm
	Concha 5'; Hysén 85'		D. Andersson 44'; Safari 59'; Litmanen 64'	Stadium: Stockholms Stadion

14 May 2006 Round 9	IFK Göteborg	1–0	Malmö FF	Gothenburg
	Olsson 56'			Stadium: Gamla Ullevi

15 July 2006 Round 10	Malmö FF	3–1	AIK	Malmö
	Johansson 33, 82'; Júnior 86'		Özkan 90'	Stadium: Malmö Stadion

23 July 2006 Round 11	Gefle IF	4–3	Malmö FF	Gävle
	Woxlin 50, 52, 82'; Westlin 69'		Johansson 7'; Hallfreðsson 8'; D. Andersson 42'	Stadium: Strömvallen

31 July 2006 Round 12	Malmö FF	2–0	Östers IF	Malmö
	Júnior 52'; Johansson 90'			Stadium: Malmö Stadion

8 August 2006 Round 13	IF Elfsborg	4–2	Malmö FF	Borås
	A. Svensson 16, 54'; Alexandersson 62'; Holmén 90'		Júnior 13, 39'	Stadium: Borås Arena

13 August 2006 Round 14	Malmö FF	1–1	IF Elfsborg	Malmö
	D. Andersson 6'		A. Svensson 55'	Stadium: Malmö Stadion

20 August 2006 Round 15	BK Häcken	1–3	Malmö FF	Gothenburg
	Olofsson 71'		Júnior 11'; Johansson 38, 56'	Stadium: Rambergsvallen

28 August 2006 Round 16	Malmö FF	4–2	Örgryte IS	Malmö
	Hallfreðsson 16'; Johansson 46, 53'; Pode 58'		Mwila 30'; Storm 52'	Stadium: Malmö Stadion

12 September 2006 Round 17	Helsingborgs IF	3–1	Malmö FF	Helsingborg
	Shelton 53, 66'; G. Andersson 90'		Johansson 23'	Stadium: Olympia

16 September 2006 Round 18	Malmö FF	0–1	Djurgårdens IF	Malmö
			Sjölund 72'	Stadium: Malmö Stadion

21 September 2006 Round 19	Malmö FF	2–2	Kalmar FF	Malmö
	Pode 44'; Johansson 52'		V. Elm 3'; Ari 73'	Stadium: Malmö Stadion

24 September 2006 Round 20	Halmstads BK	2–2	Malmö FF	Halmstad
	Đurić 23'; Ingelsten 77'		Pode 14'; Hallfreðsson 87'	Stadium: Örjans Vall

2 October 2006 Round 21	Hammarby IF	2–2	Malmö FF	Stockholm
	Paulinho 19'; Eguren 61'		Júnior 39'; Johansson 48'	Stadium: Söderstadion

16 October 2006 Round 22	Malmö FF	2–0	GAIS	Malmö
	Osmanovski 23'; Hallfreðsson 27'			Stadium: Malmö Stadion

22 October 2006 Round 23	Malmö FF	2–2	Gefle IF	Malmö
	Pode 1, 23'		Ericsson 64, 71'	Stadium: Malmö Stadion

25 October 2006 Round 24	Östers IF	2–1	Malmö FF	Växjö
	Teever 2'; D. Svensson 82'		Hallfreðsson 43'	Stadium: Värendsvallen

30 October 2006 Round 25	Malmö FF	2–1	IFK Göteborg	Malmö
	Júnior 72, 76'		Wowoah 81'	Stadium: Malmö Stadion

5 November 2006 Round 26	AIK	3–0	Malmö FF	Solna
	Figueiredo 43'; Burgič 48'; Jonsson 65'			Stadium: Råsunda

== Club ==
=== Kit ===
Supplier: Puma
Sponsor(s): Nätverket

Home; Domestic	Away; Domestic

Source: Malmö FF

=== Other information ===
Chairman	(Sweden) Bengt Madsen
Ground (capacity and dimensions)	Malmö Stadion (27,500 / )

Updated to match played 19 October
Source: Malmö FF and Malmö Stadion
