= Behrang Safari =

Swedish footballer (born 1985)

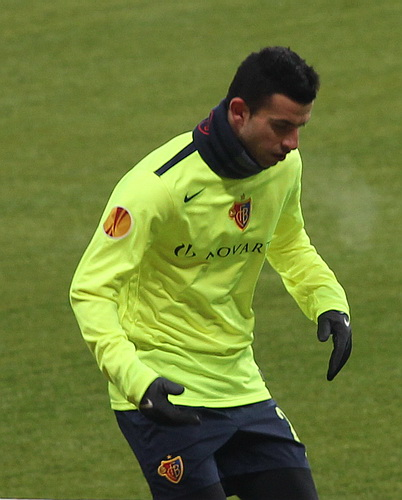
- Safari warming up for Basel in 2011

Personal information
- Full name: Behrang Safari
- Date of birth: 9 February 1985 (age 41)
- Place of birth: Tehran, Iran
- Height: 1.81 m (5 ft 11 in)
- Positions: Left-back; centre-back

Youth career
- 1992–2001: Lunds SK
- 2001–2004: Malmö FF

Senior career*
Years	Team	Apps	(Gls)
2004–2008	Malmö FF	59	(2)
2008–2011	FC Basel	94	(1)
2011–2013	Anderlecht	44	(0)
2013–2016	FC Basel	64	(0)
2016–2020	Malmö FF	82	(1)
2021	Lunds SK	6	(1)
Total		349	(5)

International career
2008–2013	Sweden	31	(0)
- * Club domestic league appearances and goals as of 17 June 2022

Behrang Safari (Persian: بهرنگ صفری, Persian pronunciation: [behræŋɡ sæfæriː]; born 9 February 1985) is a former professional footballer who played as a defender. Starting off his professional career with Malmö FF in 2004, he went on to play for FC Basel and RSC Anderlecht before retiring at Malmö in 2020. Born in Iran, he won 31 caps for the Sweden national team and was named in their UEFA Euro 2012 squad.

== Early life ==
Behrang Safari emigrated to Sweden as a two-year-old from Tehran, Iran, with his family. They settled in the small town of Höganäs, and later moved to Lund when he was five.

== Club career ==
=== Malmö FF ===
Safari came through the ranks at Malmö FF and played his first game in the Allsvenskan in July 2004 when he came on as a substitute. He made his UEFA debut in the 2004 UEFA Intertoto Cup on 19 June 2004 against Cork City F.C. He won the Allsvenskan in his first season and became a first-team regular the following season.

=== FC Basel ===
On 15 June 2008, Malmö announced that Safari had been sold to FC Basel in Switzerland. This was confirmed one day later by FCB Online and they stated that he signed a three-year contract. He joined Basel's first team for their 2008–09 season under head coach Christian Gross. To the beginning of the season Safari was member of the Basel team that won the Uhrencup. They beat Legia Warsaw 6–1 and played a 2–2 draw with Borussia Dortmund to end the table on top slot above Dortmund and Luzern. After playing in seven test games, Safari played his domestic league debut for the club in the home game in the St. Jakob-Park on 23 July 2008 as Basel won 1–0 against Grasshopper Club Zürich.

Basel joined the 2008–09 UEFA Champions League in the second qualifying round. Safari played his first European game in a Basel shirt on 30 July 2008 in a 1–1 Champions League qualifying match draw with IFK Göteborg at Ullevi. With an aggregate score of 5–3 they eliminated Göteborg. The next round would have Basel overtake Vitória de Guimarães despite a first leg goalless draw, succeeding with a second leg 2–1 win. They advanced to the group stage. Basel would be matched with Barcelona, Sporting CP and Shakhtar Donetsk, but would end the string in last position winning just one point after a 1–1 draw in Camp Nou. At the end of the 2008–09 Super League season Basel were third in the table, seven points behind new champions Zürich and one adrift of runners-up Young Boys. In the 2008–09 Swiss Cup Basel advanced via Schötz, Bulle, Thun and Zurich to the semi-finals. But here they were stopped by Young Boys. After a goalless 90 minutes and extra time YB decided the penalty shoot-out 3–2 and advanced to the final to become runners-up, as Sion became cup winners.

For their 2009–10 season Basel appointed Thorsten Fink as their new head coach. Safari scored his first goal for the club on 7 February 2010 in the home game in the St. Jakob-Park as Basel won 4–0 against BSC Young Boys. Basel joined the 2009–10 UEFA Europa League in the second qualifying round. Basel advanced to the group stage, in which despite winning three of the six games the ended in third position and were eliminated. They finished four points behind group winners Roma and one behind Fulham, against whom they lost 3–2 in the last game of the stage. At the end of the 2009–10 season he won the Double with his club. They won the League Championship title with 3 points advantage over second placed Young Boys. The team won the Swiss Cup, winning the final 6–0 against Lausanne-Sport.

Basel started in the 2010–11 UEFA Champions League third qualifying round and advanced to the group stage, but ended the group in third position. Therefore, they dropped to the 2010–11 Europa League knockout phase, but here they were eliminated by Spartak Moscow due to a last minute goal against them. Safari played in all 12 matches. With Basel, Safari won the Swiss Championship for the second time at the end of the 2010–11 season, topping the table just one point clear of rivals Zürich.

On 30 May 2011 it was announced that Safari would leave the club. Safari played 94 league games for Basel during his three-year contract.

=== Anderlecht ===
On 30 May 2011, Behrang signed a contract for the Belgian club Anderlecht. He had his debut for Anderlecht on 29 July 2011 in the 2–1 away defeat against Oud-Heverlee Leuven. He played his first European game for the team in the Europa League qualifying away match over Bursaspor in the Bursa Atatürk Stadium on 18 August 2011. He won the league in his first season with Anderlecht.

=== Return to Basel ===
After Safari's return to Basel, he featured in their 2013-14 Champions League campaign. At the end of the 2013–14 Super League season Safari won his third league championship with Basel. They also reached the final of the 2013–14 Swiss Cup, but were beaten 2–0 by Zürich after extra time. During the 2013–14 Champions League season Basel reached the group stage and finished the group in third position. Thus they qualified for Europa League knockout phase and here they advanced as far as the quarter-finals.

The next season, Safari started for Basel as a left-back where they made it to the knockout stages of the 2014–15 UEFA Champions League. He also won the 2014–15 Swiss Super League, his sixth consecutive league title and seventh overall. Safari and his Basel teammates attended a charity event in June 2015. He continued in the left back position the following season in the Champions League, Europa League and Swiss Super League.

The season 2014–15 was a successful one for Safari and for his club Basel. The championship was won for the sixth time in a row that season and in the 2014–15 Swiss Cup they reached the final. But for the third season in a row, they finished as runners-up, losing 0–3 to FC Sion in the final. Basel entered the Champions League in the group stage and reached the knockout phase as on 9 December 2014 they managed a 1–1 draw at Anfield against Liverpool. But then Basel lost to Porto in the Round of 16. Basel played a total of 65 matches (36 Swiss League fixtures, six Swiss Cup, eight Champions League and 15 test matches). Under trainer Paulo Sousa, Safari totaled 41 appearances, 24 League, two Cup, seven Champions League, as well as 13 in test games. Safari scored one goal in these matches during a friendly game against FC Schaffhausen.

Under trainer Urs Fischer Safari won the Swiss Super League championship at the end of the 2015–16 Super League season for the fifth time with Basel. For the club it was the seventh title in a row and their 19th championship title in total.

During the 2015–16 FC Basel season Safari decided to return to Sweden due to family reasons at the end of the season. He signed for Malmö FF. Between the years 2008 to 2011 and again from 2013 to 2016_ Safari played a total of 291 games for Basel scoring a total of 3 goals. 157 of these games were in the Swiss Super League, 14 in the Swiss Cup, 59 were in a UEFA European-competitions (Champions League and Europa League) and 61 were friendly games. He scored one goal in the domestic league, the other two were scored during the test games. During his six seasons with FCB Safari won the Swiss championship five times and the domestic cup once.

=== Return to Malmö FF ===
On 18 January 2016 it was announced that Safari would return to Malmö FF when his contract with FC Basel expired at the end of the 2015–16 season. Safari signed a contract with Malmö that extends over the 2020 season and allows him to join the team halfway through the 2016 season. He scored a goal in the Allsvenskan on 11 April 2017 against GIF Sundsvall and was named vice-captain after Markus Rosenberg. He won his tenth league title after winning the 2017 Allsvenskan, making Zlatan Ibrahimović the only Swede with more league titles. Safari became a regular starter for MFF as they qualified for the 2018–19 UEFA Europa League on 30 August 2018. On 28 September 2020, Safari announced that he would retire from professional football after the 2020 season. On 8 November 2020, Safari and Malmö won the 2020 Allsvenskan. Safari played his final professional match on 6 December 2020 in a 4–0 win over Östersund, raising the Lennart Johansson Trophy afterwards and receiving a tribute from the likes of Walter Samuel and Roger Federer.

=== Return to Lunds SK ===
On 13 December 2020, Safari returned to his boyhood club Lunds SK in the Swedish Division 5 for their 2021 season. Safari and Lunds SK became champions of Division 5 Skåne sydvästra by the end of the 2021 season.

== International career ==
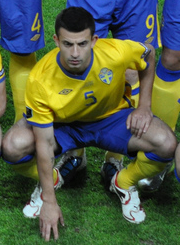
Safari playing for Sweden in 2010.

Safari was called up to the Sweden national team for their friendly match tour in January 2008. He played in all of the matches, which were a 1–0 win over Costa Rica, a 2–0 defeat to the United States, and a 0–0 draw with Turkey. During his debut game against Costa Rica, Safari set up the only goal of the game with a cross to Samuel Holmén, who volleyed the ball into the back of the net.

Safari featured in Sweden's Euro 2012 qualifiers and was called up to their UEFA Euro 2012 squad by manager Erik Hamrén.

== Style of play ==
Safari has been praised for his crosses and ability to adapt to both defensive and attacking roles on the left side of play.

== Outside football ==
=== Personal life ===
Safari is the main character of a children's book that intends to promote autism awareness after his sons Emiliano and Leon were diagnosed. The book has been ordered by some teachers and schools in Sweden.

During his professional playing career, Safari's agent was Martin Dahlin.

=== Sponsorship ===
Safari is outfitted by German sportswear manufacturer Puma.

== Post-professional career ==
=== Football agent ===
After retiring from playing professional football with Malmö FF, Safari announced in December 2020 that he would begin his career as a football agent along with former teammate Markus Rosenberg, with their agency being called Full Potential Agency.

=== Broadcasting career ===
In 2022, Safari joined Swedish television broadcaster C More as a studio analyst during the UEFA Champions League.

== Career statistics ==
=== Club ===
As of 19 April 2022

Appearances and goals by club, season and competition
Club	Season	League			Cup		Continental		Total	
Club	Season	Division	Apps	Goals	Apps	Goals	Apps	Goals	Apps	Goals
Malmö FF	2004	Allsvenskan	3	0	0	0	1	0	4	0
Malmö FF	2005	Allsvenskan	3	0	1	0	1	0	5	0
Malmö FF	2006	Allsvenskan	18	2	2	0	—		20	2
Malmö FF	2007	Allsvenskan	24	0	1	0	—		25	0
Malmö FF	2008	Allsvenskan	11	0	1	0	—		12	0
Malmö FF	Total		59	2	5	0	2	0	66	2
FC Basel	2008–09	Swiss Super League	34	0	5	0	9	0	48	0
FC Basel	2009–10	Swiss Super League	32	1	3	0	10	0	45	1
FC Basel	2010–11	Swiss Super League	28	0	0	0	12	0	40	0
FC Basel	Total		94	1	8	0	31	0	133	1
Anderlecht	2011–12	Belgian Pro League	24	0	1	0	9	0	34	0
Anderlecht	2012–13	Belgian Pro League	20	0	4	0	5	0	29	0
Anderlecht	Total		44	0	5	0	14	0	63	0
FC Basel	2013–14	Swiss Super League	21	0	3	0	10	0	34	0
FC Basel	2014–15	Swiss Super League	25	0	2	0	7	0	34	0
FC Basel	2015–16	Swiss Super League	18	0	1	0	11	0	30	0
FC Basel	Total		64	0	6	0	28	0	98	0
Malmö FF	2016	Allsvenskan	11	0	0	0	—		11	0
Malmö FF	2017	Allsvenskan	21	1	1	0	0	0	22	1
Malmö FF	2018	Allsvenskan	21	0	6	0	13	0	40	0
Malmö FF	2019	Allsvenskan	16	0	2	0	16	1	34	1
Malmö FF	2020	Allsvenskan	13	0	3	0	3	0	19	0
Malmö FF	Total		82	1	12	0	32	1	126	2
Lunds SK	2021	Division 5 Skåne sydvästra	6	1	—		—		6	1
Career total			349	5	36	0	107	1	492	6

=== International ===
Appearances and goals by national team and year
National team	Year	Apps	Goals
Sweden	2008	5	0
Sweden	2009	7	0
Sweden	2010	8	0
Sweden	2011	3	0
Sweden	2012	6	0
Sweden	2013	2	0
Total		31	0

== Honours ==
Malmö FF

- Allsvenskan: 2004, 2016, 2017, 2020

Basel

- Swiss Super League: 2009–10, 2010–11, 2013–14, 2014–15, 2015–16
- Swiss Cup: 2009–2010

Anderlecht

- Belgian First Division: 2011–12, 2012–13

Lunds SK

- Division 5 Skåne sydvästra: 2021

== See also ==
- Swedish Iranians
