= Afonso Alves =

Brazilian footballer (born 1981)

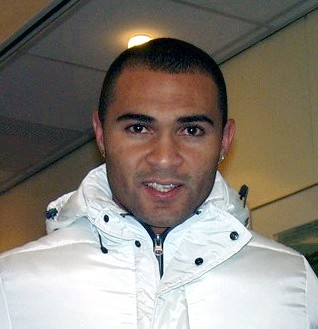
- Alves in 2007

Personal information
- Full name: Afonso Alves Martins Júnior
- Date of birth: 30 January 1981 (age 45)
- Place of birth: Belo Horizonte, Brazil
- Height: 1.85 m (6 ft 1 in)
- Position: Striker

Senior career*
Years	Team	Apps	(Gls)
2001–2002	Atlético Mineiro		
2002–2003	Örgryte	39	(23)
2004–2006	Malmö FF	55	(29)
2006–2008	Heerenveen	39	(45)
2008–2009	Middlesbrough	42	(10)
2009–2010	Al Sadd	13	(2)
2010	→ Al-Rayyan (loan)	7	(8)
2010–2012	Al-Rayyan	27	(19)
2012–2013	Al-Gharafa	4	(0)
Total		227	(136)

International career
2007	Brazil	8	(1)
- * Club domestic league appearances and goals

Afonso Alves Martins Júnior (born 30 January 1981), better known as Afonso Alves, is a Brazilian former professional footballer who played as a striker. He represented Atlético Mineiro, Örgryte, Malmö FF, Heerenveen, Middlesbrough, Al-Sadd, Al-Rayyan and Al-Gharafa during a career that spanned between 2001 and 2013. He won eight caps and scored one goal for the Brazil national team, and helped his country win the 2007 Copa América.

== Club career ==
=== Heerenveen ===
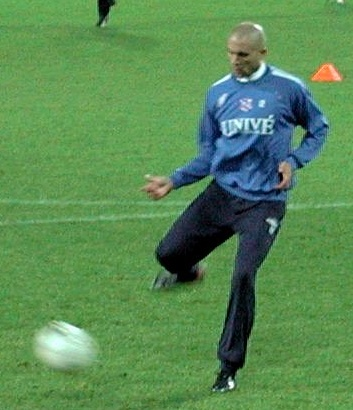
Afonso Alves with Heerenveen

In Summer 2006, he moved to the Dutch club SC Heerenveen of the Eredivisie for €4.5 million, which remains their highest-ever transfer fee paid.

In his first season, he finished as top goalscorer of the Eredivisie with 34 goals (in 31 games), which is a club record. Alves is the third Brazilian to become topscorer in the Dutch first division, joining former PSV strikers Romário and Ronaldo, and the second Brazilian who scored over 30 goals in the same competition, with Ronaldo netting 30 in the 1994–95 season. Other than finishing first in the scorers table, he was runner-up in the race for the European Golden Boot, a single point behind Roma forward Francesco Totti.

On 7 October 2007, in only his second appearance of the season, Alves scored seven goals in his side's 9–0 victory over Heracles Almelo, setting a new Eredivisie record for most goals scored in a single match. Heerenveen's manager (Gertjan Verbeek) had already made three substitutions yet chose to take Alves off the pitch in the 89th minute to pay tribute to his fantastic performance.

=== Middlesbrough ===
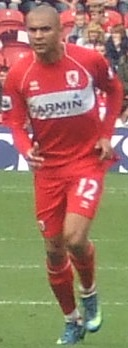
Alves with Middlesbrough

In the January transfer window of the 2007–08 season he moved to Premier League side Middlesbrough on 31 January 2008. Alves' transfer fee was said to have been €12 million, on a four-and-a-half-year contract.

He made his debut on 9 February, against Fulham as a second-half substitute for Lee Dong-Gook. His first Middlesbrough start came on 27 February in an FA Cup home tie against Sheffield United, when he was substituted in the 73 minute. Middlesbrough eventually won the game 1–0.

His first two goals for Middlesbrough came at the Riverside Stadium on 6 April against Manchester United in a 2–2 draw. He finished his first season in England with a hat-trick in an 8–1 home victory against Manchester City.

Alves' first goal of the 2008–09 season came on 30 August, where he scored a 25-yard free-kick which flew into the top corner of the Stoke City net. He then scored goals against Blackburn Rovers and a penalty against Manchester City, two against Barrow and one against local rivals Sunderland with a goal from 18 yards out. However, Alves could not find steady form which led to his record move, and with a haul of just four league goals the season turned out to be a disappointing one for both him and Middlesbrough, who were relegated to the Championship.

=== Al-Sadd ===
On 4 September 2009, Alves moved to Al-Sadd on a three-year deal for £7 million. He scored 2 goals in 12 league matches, and scored one goal in the Qatari Stars Cup after three games. Alves then accepted a loan bid from another Qatari League club, Al-Rayyan SC.

=== Al-Rayyan ===
On 31 January 2010, Alves was loaned to the Qatari seven-time league champion Al-Rayyan SC, coached by the Brazilian coach Paulo Autuori. Alves scored 18 goals on his loan spell, 9 of them in seven matches of the AFC Cup, and seven goals in seven league matches. He officially moved to Al-Rayyan in May 2010.

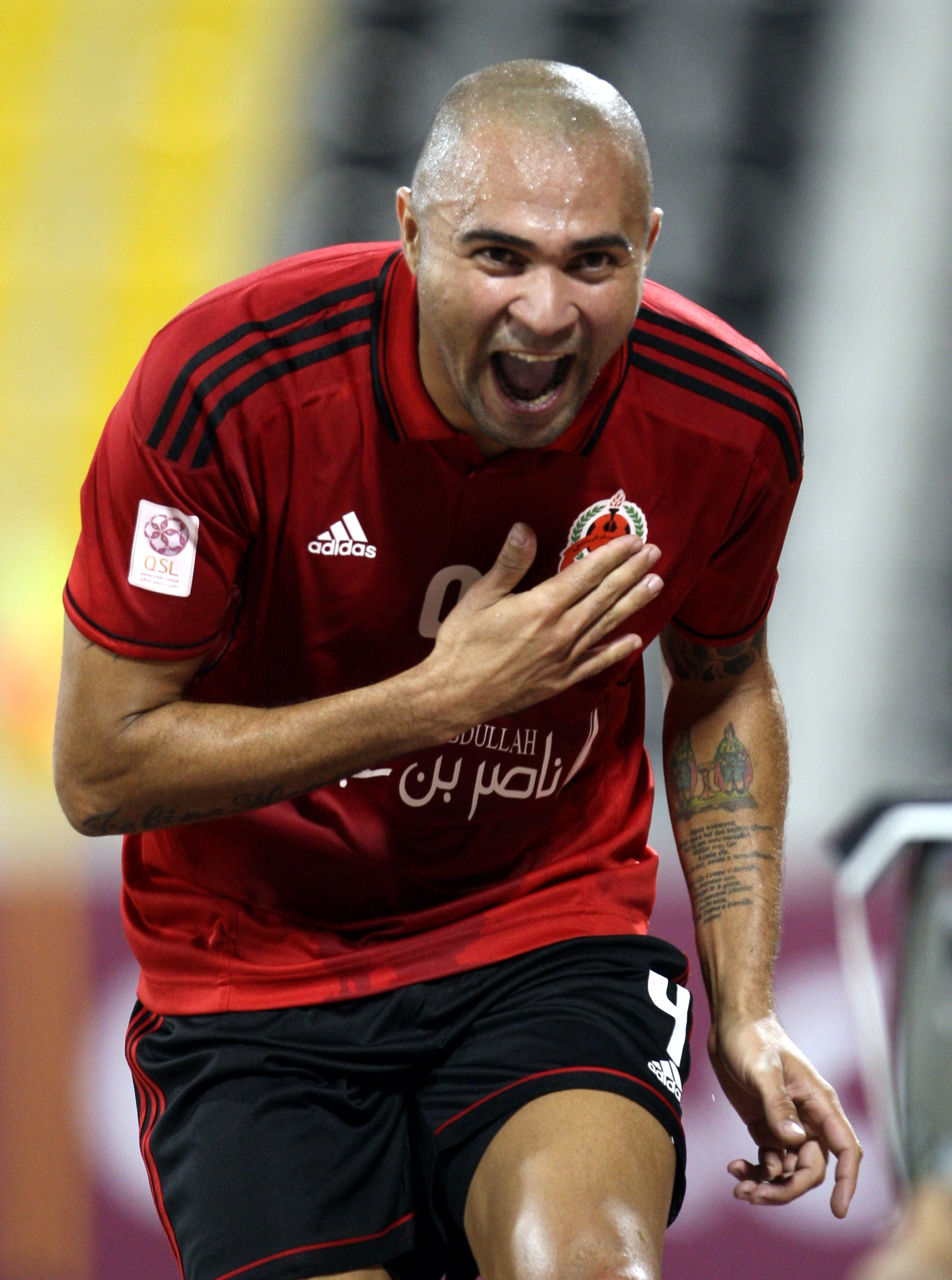
Alves in Al-Rayyan colours

Alves officially moved to Al-Rayyan SC for a further two years after winning the 2010 Emir of Qatar Cup with Al Rayyan on 15 May 2010.

Alves shortly emerged as a fan favorite, however he suffered a ligament injury in his left knee in December which kept him out of action for eight months. While recovering, he stated:

"Offers may’ve come to me during the transfer period, but I never bothered to listen to them and left them all to my agent. While recuperating from surgery, I remained in touch with coach Paulo (Autuori) and the club management, and kept them updated on my progress."

He rejoined Al-Rayyan as their top striker and started the 2011–12 season in Al-Rayyan's starting eleven.

=== Al Gharafa and retirement ===
On 11 September 2012, he signed a one–year deal with QSL club Al Gharafa as their fourth professional player.

Having been a free agent for over two seasons, Alves announced his retirement from professional football on his Instagram page on 5 October 2015. Alves had been training with the youth team of his former club Heerenveen the days before his decision to retire.

== International career ==
On 17 May 2007, Alves received his first call-up for the Brazil national team for friendlies against England and Turkey. On 1 June, in the game against England, Alves was brought on to replace Kaká after 71 minutes of play and very nearly scored after a Wes Brown slip. He was also part of the Brazilian squad which won the 2007 Copa América in Venezuela. Alves scored his first international goal on 12 September 2007 against Mexico in a 3–1 win.

== Career statistics ==
=== Club ===
Appearances and goals by club, season and competition
Club	Season	League			National cup (Note: Includes Svenska Cupen, KNVB Cup, FA Cup)		League cup (Note: Includes Football League Cup)		Continental		Other		Total	
Club	Season	Division	Apps	Goals	Apps	Goals	Apps	Goals	Apps	Goals	Apps	Goals	Apps	Goals
Atlético Mineiro	2001	Série A												
Atlético Mineiro	2002	Série A												
Atlético Mineiro	Total													
Örgryte IS	2002	Allsvenskan	18	13			–		–		–		18	13
Örgryte IS	2003	Allsvenskan	21	10			–		2 (Note: Appearances in UEFA Intertoto Cup)	2	–		23	12
Örgryte IS	Total		39	23			–		2	2	–		41	25
Malmö FF	2004	Allsvenskan	24	12			–		2	0	–		26	12
Malmö FF	2005	Allsvenskan	24	14			–		6 (Note: Four appearances and one goal in UEFA Champions League, two appearances and two goals in UEFA Cup)	3	–		30	17
Malmö FF	2006	Allsvenskan	7	3			–		0	0	–		7	3
Malmö FF	Total		55	29			–		8	3	–		63	32
Heerenveen	2006–07	Eredivisie	31	34	1	0	–		6 (Note: Appearance(s) in UEFA Cup)	3	2 (Note: Appearances in Eredivisie European play-offs)	0	40	37
Heerenveen	2007–08	Eredivisie	8	11	1	0	–		1	0	–		10	11
Heerenveen	Total		39	45	2	0	0	0	7	3	2	0	50	48
Middlesbrough	2007–08	Premier League	11	6	3	0	0	0	–		–		14	6
Middlesbrough	2008–09	Premier League	31	4	3	3	1	0	–		–		35	7
Middlesbrough	Total		42	10	6	3	1	0	–		–		49	13
Al-Sadd	2009–10	Qatar Stars League	13	2									13	2
Al Rayyan (loan)	2009–10	Qatar Stars League	7	8									7	8
Al-Rayyan	2010–11	Qatar Stars League	9	4									9	4
Al-Rayyan	2011–12	Qatar Stars League	18	15					5 (Note: Appearances in AFC Champions League)	0			23	15
Al-Rayyan	Total		27	19	0	0	0	0	5	0	0	0	32	19
Al Gharafa	2012–13	Qatar Stars League	4	0									4	0
Career total			226	136	8	3	1	0	22	8	2	0	259	147

=== International ===
Appearances and goals by national team and year
National team	Year	Apps	Goals
Brazil	2007	8	1
Total		8	1

Scores and results list Brazil's goal tally first, score column indicates score after Alves goal.

International goals scored by Afonso Alves
#	Date	Venue	Opponent	Score	Result	Competition
1	12 September 2007	Gillette Stadium, Foxborough, USA	Mexico	3–1	3–1	Friendly

== Honours ==
Malmö FF

- Allsvenskan: 2004

Al-Rayyan

- Emir of Qatar Cup: 2010
- Qatar Crown Prince Cup: 2012

Brazil

- Copa América: 2007

Individual

- Eredivisie top scorer: 2006–07
- Dutch Footballer of the Year: 2007
- AFC Cup top scorer: 2010
