= 2006–07 Eredivisie =

51st season of the Eredivisie

Eredivisie
- Season: 2006–07
- Dates: 18 August 2006 – 29 April 2007
- Champions: PSV (20th title)
- Promoted: Excelsior
- Relegated: ADO Den Haag; RKC Waalwijk
- Champions League: PSV; Ajax
- UEFA Cup: FC Groningen; AZ; SC Heerenveen; FC Twente
- Intertoto Cup: Utrecht
- Top goalscorer: Afonso Alves (34 goals)
- Biggest home win: AZ 8–1 NAC (2006-10-07)
- Biggest away win: PSV 1–5 Ajax (2006-08-19)
- Highest scoring: AZ 8–1 NAC (2006-10-07)
- Average attendance: 18,078

Locations of the 2006–07 Eredivisie teams
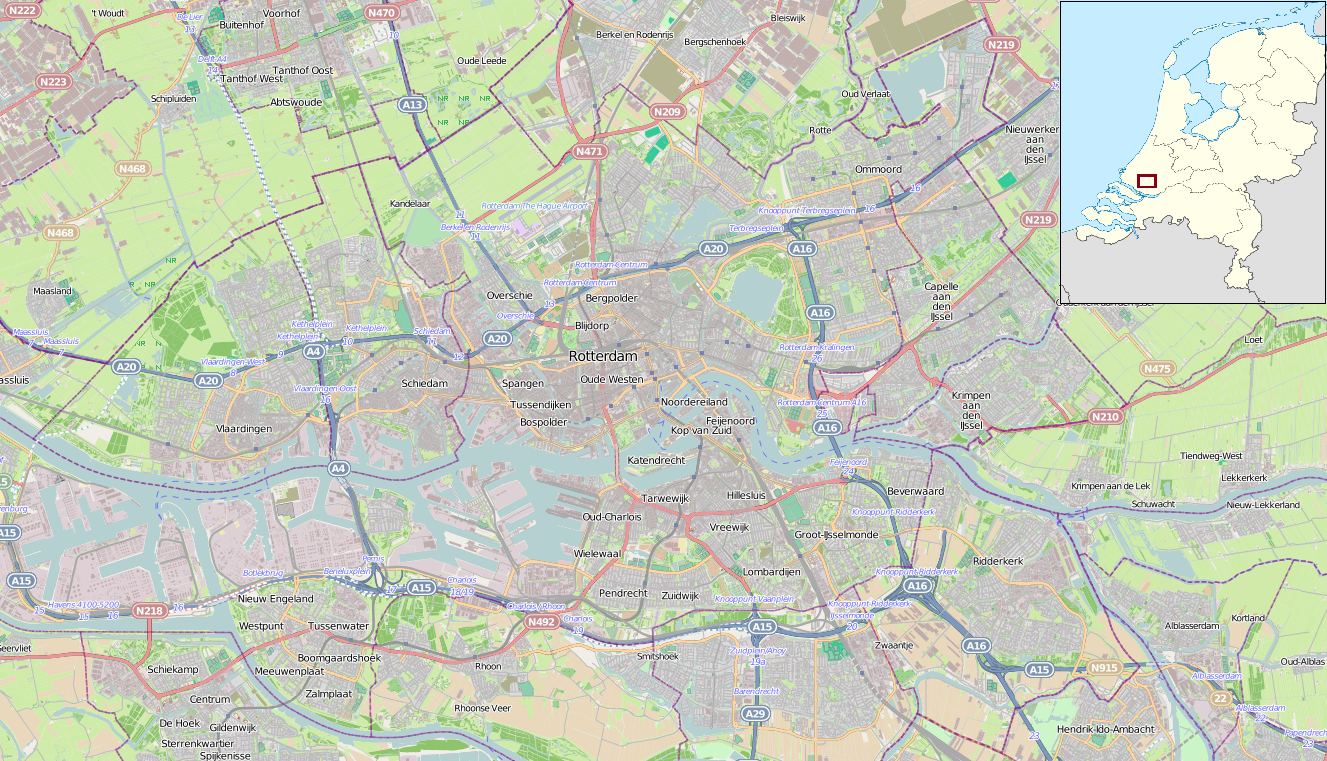
Rotterdam Eredivisie football clubs

The 2006–07 Eredivisie season began on August 18, 2006. The season saw PSV Eindhoven quickly building a gap with the other teams. After 20 matches, the club was 11 points ahead of AZ and 12 points ahead of Ajax. The lead quickly dissipated in the 13 matches that followed. A draw of PSV at FC Utrecht in the penultimate round saw AZ and Ajax catching up. The three clubs were all on 72 points from 33 matches, with the AZ on top due to goal difference.

Ajax were second, PSV were third. AZ suffered a shock defeat at league minnows Excelsior Rotterdam in the final round, playing with 10 men after 15 minutes in the game. Ajax won 0–2 against Willem II, and PSV beat Vitesse 5–1. PSV and Ajax both finished on 75 points, but PSV finished first due to a better goal difference (+50, against +49 for Ajax) to end one of the most exciting and closest title races in many years.

== Promoted team ==
This team was promoted from the Eerste Divisie at the start of the season:

- Excelsior (Eerste Divisie champions)

== Relegated teams ==
The following teams were relegated to the Eerste Divisie at the end of the season:

- ADO Den Haag
- RKC Waalwijk

== Promoted teams ==
The following teams were promoted from the Eerste Divisie at the end of the season:

- De Graafschap
- VVV-Venlo

== League table ==
Pos	Team	Pld	W	D	L	GF	GA	GD	Pts	Qualification or relegation
1	PSV (C)	34	23	6	5	75	25	+50	75	Qualification to Champions League group stage
2	Ajax	34	23	6	5	84	35	+49	75	Qualification to Champions League third qualifying round playoff
3	AZ	34	21	9	4	83	31	+52	72	Qualification to Champions League third qualifying round playoff
4	Twente	34	19	9	6	67	37	+30	66	Qualification to Champions League third qualifying round playoff
5	Heerenveen	34	16	7	11	60	43	+17	55	Qualification to Champions League third qualifying round playoff
6	Roda JC	34	15	9	10	47	36	+11	54	Qualification to UEFA Cup first round playoff
7	Feyenoord	34	15	8	11	56	66	−10	53	Qualification to UEFA Cup first round playoff
8	Groningen	34	15	6	13	54	54	0	51	Qualification to UEFA Cup first round playoff
9	Utrecht	34	13	9	12	41	44	−3	48	Qualification to UEFA Cup first round playoff
10	NEC	34	12	8	14	36	44	−8	44	Qualification to Intertoto Cup third round playoff
11	NAC Breda	34	12	7	15	43	54	−11	43	Qualification to Intertoto Cup third round playoff
12	Vitesse Arnhem	34	10	8	16	50	55	−5	38	Qualification to Intertoto Cup third round playoff
13	Sparta Rotterdam	34	10	7	17	40	66	−26	37	Qualification to Intertoto Cup third round playoff
14	Heracles Almelo	34	7	11	16	32	64	−32	32	
15	Willem II	34	8	7	19	31	64	−33	31	
16	Excelsior	34	8	6	20	43	65	−22	30	Qualification to relegation play-offs
17	RKC Waalwijk (R)	34	6	9	19	33	60	−27	27	Qualification to relegation play-offs
18	ADO Den Haag (R)	34	3	8	23	40	72	−32	17	Relegation to Eerste Divisie

Rules for classification: 1) points; 2) goal difference; 3) number of goals scored.
(C) Champions; (R) Relegated

== Results ==
Home \ Away	ADO	AJX	AZ	EXC	FEY	GRO	HEE	HER	NAC	NEC	PSV	RKC	RJC	SPA	TWE	UTR	VIT	WIL
ADO Den Haag		1–2	1–3	2–2	3–3	1–3 (Note: The match was suspended for crowd trouble 4 minutes into the second half, while FC Groningen were leading 0-3. The remaining minutes were played three days later.)	2–3	2–0	0–2	0–2	0–2	1–1	0–2	2–4	1–2	1–1	0–3 (Note: The match was suspended after 63 minutes, after ADO supporters had invaded the pitch. The Royal Dutch Football Association decided ten days later that the game would not be finished, making the score at the time of the suspension the final score.)	2–1
Ajax	2–0		2–2	2–2	4–1	3–2	0–1	3–0	2–0	2–0	0–1	5–0	2–0	5–2	1–1	2–0	3–0	6–0
AZ	2–2	1–1		5–0	0–0	2–0	3–1	5–0	8–1	0–0	1–3	2–0	2–2	3–0	2–2	5–1	1–0	2–0
Excelsior	3–1	1–3	3–2		1–3	0–2	3–1	6–1	0–2	1–1	0–0	0–3	0–1	3–1	1–2	0–1	2–2	3–2
Feyenoord	3–1	0–4	3–2	1–0		0–4	4–3	0–0	3–2	1–1	1–1	3–1	4–3	3–2	2–1	2–0	2–1	0–0
FC Groningen	2–5	2–3	1–1	2–1	3–0		1–1	2–1	3–1	4–1	0–2	1–1	2–1	0–1	1–1	0–2	4–3	4–1
SC Heerenveen	1–1	0–2	1–3	2–0	5–1	4–2		5–1	4–2	3–0	0–0	1–0	1–0	2–0	1–2	0–0	0–0	5–0
Heracles Almelo	4–3	0–3	0–0	3–2	4–1	0–1	1–0		2–0	0–0	0–2	1–1	1–1	2–3	3–0	3–0	2–2	2–2
NAC Breda	2–2	1–2	1–4	2–1	4–1	0–0	1–1	1–1		0–2	1–1	2–1	0–2	3–1	0–0	2–1	2–1	0–0
NEC	3–2	2–2	0–2	0–1	4–1	1–1	0–2	2–0	2–1		2–1	1–0	0–0	1–2	0–3	2–0	1–0	1–2
PSV	2–1	1–5	2–3	4–0	2–1	1–0	3–1	3–0	3–0	3–1		2–0	4–1	7–0	2–0	5–0	5–1	4–0
RKC Waalwijk	1–0	2–2	0–2	1–1	2–2	0–2	0–2	2–0	0–1	0–1	0–3		3–2	2–1	1–2	1–1	3–1	1–1
Roda JC	1–0	2–0	0–2	2–0	1–2	0–1	1–0	7–0	3–2	1–0	2–0	1–1		2–1	2–0	0–0	2–4	2–1
Sparta Rotterdam	2–1	3–0	0–2	2–1	1–4	0–1	2–2	0–0	0–3	0–4	1–1	1–0	2–2		3–0	1–1	1–2	1–0
FC Twente	3–1	1–4	3–0	4–1	3–0	7–1	5–1	1–1	2–1	4–0	1–0	4–3	2–2	2–0		3–0	2–0	0–0
FC Utrecht	2–0	2–3	0–4	1–0	2–1	3–0	1–0	0–0	1–0	3–0	1–1	5–0	2–0	2–2	0–0		2–0	3–0
Vitesse	2–2	4–2	1–3	2–3	0–1	3–2	1–3	4–0	0–1	1–1	0–1	3–1	0–0	3–0	1–1	4–2		1–0
Willem II	2–1	0–2	0–4	2–1	3–5	3–0	1–3	2–0	0–2	1–0	1–3	3–1	0–1	0–0	1–3	2–1	0–0	

Legend: Blue = home team win; Yellow = draw; Red = away team win.

== Play-offs ==
=== For UEFA competitions ===
For one Champions League ticket and three UEFA Cup tickets

Matches A and B
5	SC Heerenveen	1
2	Ajax	4
4	FC Twente	1
3	AZ	3

Match E
A	Ajax	4
B	AZ	2

Ajax have qualified for 2007–08 UEFA Champions League. AZ, FC Twente and Heerenveen have qualified for the 2007–08 UEFA Cup.

For one UEFA Cup ticket and possibly one Intertoto Cup ticket

Matches C and D
9	FC Utrecht (advances on away goals)	1
6	Roda JC	1
8	FC Groningen	3
7	Feyenoord	2

Match G
C	FC Utrecht	1
D	FC Groningen	4

FC Groningen have qualified for the 2007–08 UEFA Cup. FC Utrecht faced Vitesse (the team winning match J) for one ticket to the UEFA Intertoto Cup 2007.

For possibly one Intertoto Cup ticket

Matches H and I
13	Sparta Rotterdam	2
10	NEC	3
12	Vitesse	4
11	NAC Breda	2

Match J
H	NEC	0
I	Vitesse	3

Vitesse faced FC Utrecht (the team losing match G) for one ticket to the UEFA Intertoto Cup 2007.

For the Intertoto Cup ticket

Match K
G	FC Utrecht	2 (a)
J	Vitesse	2

FC Utrecht have qualified for the UEFA Intertoto Cup 2007.

=== Relegation playoffs ===
Round 1

Team #1	Aggregate	Team #2	Match 1	Match 2	Match 3
FC Zwolle	1-2	FC Dordrecht	0-1	1-1	Not played
BV Veendam	5-3	Go Ahead Eagles	5-1	0-2	Not played

All teams play a home and an away match, with the possibility of a third match in case of a tie. The team that has scored the most away goals in the first two legs will play the deciding third leg at home. If both teams have scored an equal number of away goals, a penalty shootout after the second leg will decide who plays at home in the third leg.

Round 2

Team #1	Aggregate	Team #2	Match 1	Match 2	Match 3
FC Dordrecht	2-5	RKC Waalwijk	2-0	0-2	0-3
FC Den Bosch	2-3	VVV-Venlo	1-2	1-0	0-1
FC Volendam	3-6	RBC Roosendaal	3-5	0-1	Not played
BV Veendam	0-4	Excelsior	0-1	0-3	Not played

All teams play a home and an away match, with the possibility of a third match in case of a tie. The team that has scored the most away goals in the first two legs will play the deciding third leg at home. If both teams have scored an equal number of away goals, a penalty shootout after the second leg will decide who plays at home in the third leg.

Round 3

Team #1	Aggregate	Team #2	Match 1	Match 2	Match 3
VVV-Venlo	5-1	RKC Waalwijk	2-0	0-1	3-0
RBC Roosendaal	1-2	Excelsior	1-1	0-1	Not played

All teams play a home and an away match, with the possibility of a third match in case of a tie. The team that has scored the most away goals in the first two legs will play the deciding third leg at home. If both teams have scored an equal number of away goals, a penalty shootout after the second leg will decide who plays at home in the third leg.
The winners of matches G and H will play in the Eredivisie 2007/2008

== Top scorers ==
Pos.	Player	Club	Goals
1.	(Brazil) Afonso Alves	SC Heerenveen	34
2.	(Switzerland) Blaise Nkufo	FC Twente	22
2.	(Netherlands) Danny Koevermans	AZ	22
4.	(Peru) Jefferson Farfán	PSV	21
4.	(Netherlands) Klaas-Jan Huntelaar	Ajax	21
6.	(Serbia) Danko Lazović	Vitesse	19
7.	(Netherlands) Wesley Sneijder	Ajax	18
8.	(Sweden) Kennedy Bakırcıoğlu	FC Twente	15
9.	(Georgia (country)) Shota Arveladze	AZ	14
10.	(Norway) Erik Nevland	FC Groningen	13

== Awards ==
=== Individual awards ===
- Dutch Footballer of the Year: Afonso Alves (SC Heerenveen)
- Johan Cruyff Talent of the Year: Ibrahim Afellay (PSV Eindhoven)
- Top scorer: Afonso Alves (SC Heerenveen) – 34 goals

=== Team of the Year ===
The following players were selected in the Voetbal International Team of the Year for the 2006–07 Eredivisie season.

Team of the Year
Goalkeeper	(Brazil) Heurelho Gomes (PSV)			
Defenders	(Netherlands) Jan Kromkamp (PSV)	(Brazil) Alex (PSV)	(Netherlands) Joris Mathijsen (AZ)	(Netherlands) Tim de Cler (AZ)
Midfielders	(Netherlands) Phillip Cocu (PSV)	(Netherlands) Ibrahim Afellay (PSV)	(Netherlands) Wesley Sneijder (Ajax)	
Forwards	(Peru) Jefferson Farfán (PSV)	(Brazil) Afonso Alves (Heerenveen)	(Netherlands) Danny Koevermans (AZ)	

== Stadiums ==
Team	Stadium	Capacity
Ajax	Amsterdam ArenA	51,628
Feyenoord	Feijenoord Stadion	51,177
PSV	Philips Stadion	35,119
Vitesse	Gelredome	26,600
Heerenveen	Abe Lenstra Stadion	26,000
Utrecht	Stadion Galgenwaard	24,426
Groningen	Euroborg	19,814
Roda JC	Parkstad Limburg Stadion	19,979
AZ	DSB Stadion	17,023
NAC	Rat Verlegh Stadion	17,064
Willem II	Willem II Stadion	14,637
Twente	Arke Stadion	13,740
NEC	Stadion de Goffert	12,470
ADO	Zuiderpark Stadion	10,500
Sparta	Sparta Stadion / Het Kasteel	11,026
Heracles	Polman Stadion	8,500
RKC	Mandemakers Stadion	7,500
Excelsior	Stadion Woudestein	3,527

== Attendances ==
#	Football club	Home games	Average attendance
1	AFC Ajax	17	48,610
2	Feyenoord	17	40,912
3	PSV	17	33,656
4	sc Heerenveen	17	25,471
5	Vitesse	17	20,179
6	FC Utrecht	17	20,005
7	FC Groningen	17	19,182
8	AZ	17	15,980
9	NAC Breda	17	14,876
10	Roda JC	17	14,399
11	FC Twente	17	13,163
12	Willem II	17	12,527
13	NEC	17	12,015
14	Sparta Rotterdam	17	9,950
15	Heracles Almelo	17	8,419
16	ADO Den Haag	17	7,001
17	RKC Waalwijk	17	5,841
18	Excelsior	17	3,212

== See also ==
- 2006–07 KNVB Cup
- 2006–07 Eerste Divisie
