= Patrik Redo =

Swedish football player (born 1981)

Personal information
- Full name: Patrik Ted Redo
- Date of birth: 24 November 1981 (age 44)
- Place of birth: Anderstorp, Sweden
- Height: 1.92 m (6 ft 3 1/2 in)
- Positions: Midfielder; forward

Team information
- Current team: Kristianstads FF
- Number: 11

Youth career
- Anderstorp IF

Senior career*
Years	Team	Apps	(Gls)
1998–2001	IF Leikin	46	(10)
2002–2003	Halmstads BK	6	(1)
2003	→Trelleborgs FF(loan)	27	(4)
2004–2006	Trelleborgs FF	40	(8)
2007	Fram	5	(0)
2008	Keflavik	19	(7)
2009–2010	Jönköpings Södra IF	42	(5)
2011	Kristianstads FF	18	(5)
- * Club domestic league appearances and goals

Patrik Redo (born 24 November 1981) is a Swedish football player, who currently plays for Kristianstads FF.

== Career ==
Starting his career in Anderstorp IF he later moved to Halmstad and IF Leikin. In 2002, he moved to local rivals Halmstads BK. However, after making only a few appearances he was loaned to Trelleborgs FF in 2003 and was later purchased by Trelleborg. In 2007, he moved to Iceland and Fram in the Icelandic Úrvalsdeild. He stayed only one season before moving to league rivals Keflavik, yet again staying only a year before in 2009 returning to Sweden and Jönköpings Södra IF. The midfielder left on 17 March 2011 his club Jönköpings Södra IF and signed with Kristianstads FF.
