= 2010 Emir of Qatar Cup =

Emir of Qatar Cup 2010
Tournament details
- Country: Qatar
- Dates: 11 April – 15 May
- Teams: 16

Final positions
- Champions: Al-Rayyan (4th title)
- Runners-up: Umm-Salal
- Semifinalists: Al Sadd; Qatar SC

Tournament statistics
- Matches played: 17
- Goals scored: 50 (2.94 per match)

The 2010 Emir of Qatar Cup was the 38th edition of a men's football tournament in Qatar. It was played by the 1st and 2nd level divisions of the Qatari football league structure.

The top four sides of the 2009–10 Qatar Stars League season enter at the quarter-final stage.

Al-Gharrafa are the defending champions.

The cup winner were guaranteed a place in the 2011 AFC Champions League.

== First round ==
The first round of the competition involves four teams from the 2nd tier league.

Team 1	Score	Team 2
11 April 2010
Al-Jaish	4–0	Al-Markhiya
Al-Mu'aidar	1–1 (4–2)	Al-Shahaniya

== Round 2 ==
Team 1	Score	Team 2
15 April 2010
Al-Shamal	1–0	Al-Shorta
Al-Sailiya	2–1	Al-Jaish
16 April 2010
Al-Ahli	2–1	Al-Mesaimeer
Al-Khor	5–2	Al-Mu'aidar

== Round 3 ==
Team 1	Score	Team 2
25 April 2010
Umm-Salal	3–2	Al-Shamal
Al-Rayyan	1–0	Al-Sailiya
26 April 2010
Al-Wakrah	2–3	Al-Ahli
Al-Kharitiyath	3–1	Al-Khor

== Quarter-finals ==
- Top 4 league sides join this round

Team 1	Score	Team 2
30 April 2010
Umm-Salal	1–1 (4–3 pens)	Al-Arabi
1 May 2010
Qatar SC	2–1	Al-Kharitiyath
2 May 2010
Al Sadd	2–0	Al-Ahli
3 May 2010
Al-Gharafa	1–2	Al-Rayyan

== Semi-finals ==
Team 1	Score	Team 2
7 May 2010
Al-Rayyan	2–1	Al Sadd
8 May 2010
Qatar SC	0–1	Umm-Salal

== Final ==
Team 1	Score	Team 2
15 May 2010
Al-Rayyan	1–0	Umm-Salal
