= Fábio Augusto =

Brazilian footballer and coach (born 1972)

Personal information
- Full name: Fábio Augusto de Castro Carvalho
- Date of birth: 6 May 1972 (age 54)
- Place of birth: Niterói, Brazil
- Height: 1.80 m (5 ft 11 in)
- Position: Midfielder

Youth career
- 1990–1993: Flamengo

Senior career*
Years	Team	Apps	(Gls)
1993–1994	Flamengo	2	(0)
1994–1996	Guarani	97	(8)
1996	Atlético	23	(1)
1997–1998	Corinthians	9	(1)
1998–1999	Botafogo	15	(0)
2000	Vitória	4	(0)
2001	Flamengo	16	(0)
2002	Figueirense	2	(0)
2003	FC Chernomorets Novorossiysk	3	(0)
2004–2007	Kalmar FF	58	(8)
2007–2008	America		
2008	Sendas		
2009	Juventus		
2009	Uberaba		
2010	Desportiva		
2011	Paulínia		
2012	Ríver		

Managerial career
- 2013: Itaboraí Profute (assistant)
- * Club domestic league appearances and goals

Fábio Augusto de Castro Carvalho or simply Fábio Augusto (born 6 May 1972) is a Brazilian football coach and a former player.

== Honours ==
Flamengo

- Campeonato Carioca winner: 2001
- Copa dos Campeões winner: 2001

Corinthians

- Campeonato Paulista winner: 1997

Vitoria-BA

- Campeonato Baiano winner: 1999, 2000

Kalmar FF

- Svenska Cupen winner: 2007
