= Peter Abelsson =

Swedish footballer

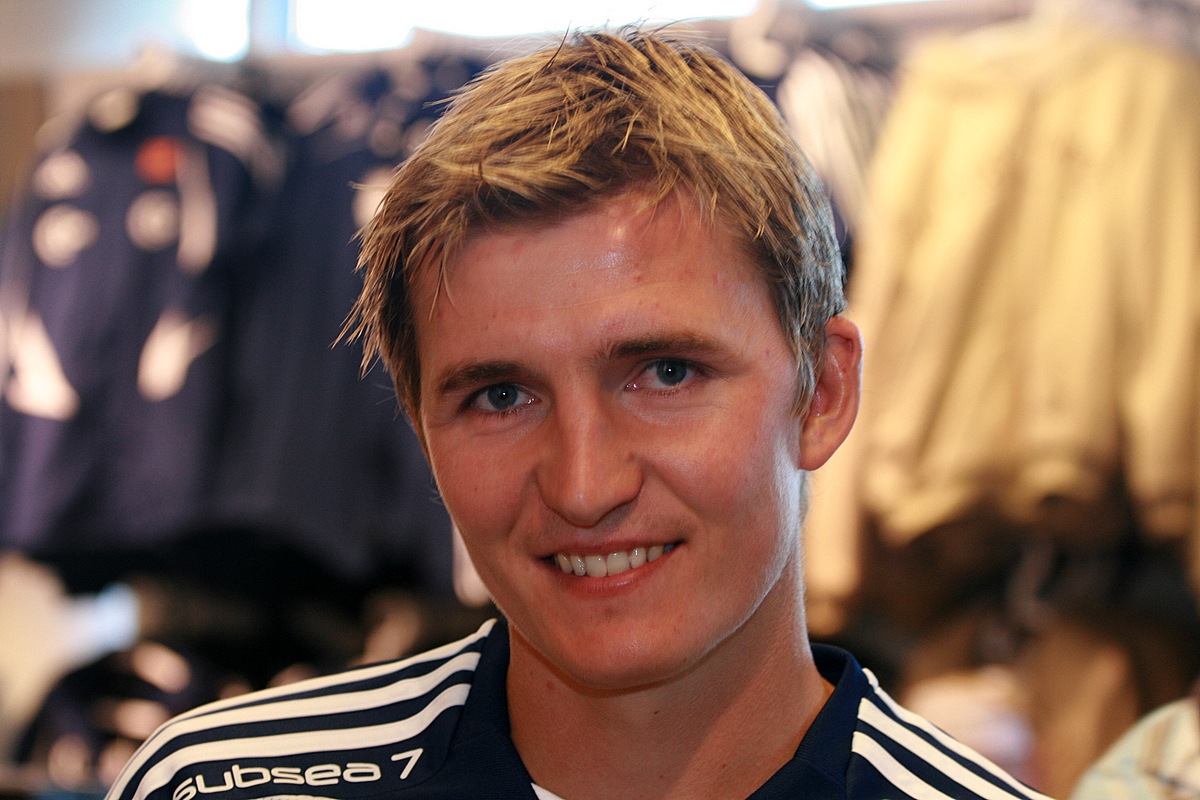

Personal information
- Date of birth: 14 July 1977
- Height: 1.88 m (6 ft 2 in)
- Position: Defender

Senior career*
Years	Team	Apps	(Gls)
1996-1998	Nybro IF	58	(8)
1999-2004	Trelleborgs FF	144	(9)
2004-2005	Malmö FF	30	(3)
2006-2008	Viking FK	41	(1)
2009-2013	Trelleborgs FF	81	(6)
Total		354	(27)
- * Club domestic league appearances and goals

Peter Abelsson (born 14 July 1977) is a Swedish former football defender who played for Trelleborgs FF (two spells), Nybro IF, Viking and Malmö FF.

== Honours ==
Malmö FF

- Allsvenskan: 2004
