= Daniel Svensson (footballer, born 1983) =

Swedish footballer

Daniel Svensson (born 4 January 1983) is a Swedish footballer who plays for BK Olympic on loan from Lunds BK.

== Career ==
Svensson represents Östers IF, a club which he joined from Markaryds IF in 2005. He plays as a defensive midfielder, but has regularly been left out of the team while at Öster. in January 2008 signed a contract with new created club LB07. After two years with IF Limhamn-Bunkeflo left the club and signed 2010 with Lunds BK. On 18 November 2010 Svensson left his club Lunds BK and moved on loaned to BK Olympic.

== Personal life ==
Svensson works in the military.
