= Dani Hamzo =

Swedish footballer (born 1978)

Personal information
- Full name: Dani Hamzo
- Date of birth: 18 June 1979 (age 47)
- Place of birth: Beirut, Lebanon
- Height: 1.78 m (5 ft 10 in)
- Position: Forward

Youth career
- Syrianska

Senior career*
Years	Team	Apps	(Gls)
2003	Östers IF	19	(5)
2004–2005	Assyriska FF	28	(5)
Total		47	(10)
- * Club domestic league appearances and goals

Dani Hamzo (Arabic: داني حمزو; born 18 June 1978) is a Swedish former professional footballer who played as a forward.

He has played in the Allsvenskan for both Östers IF and Assyriska Föreningen. He played for Öster in their opening game of the 2003 Allsvenskan season, a defeat against defending champions Djurgårdens IF.
