= Johan Nilsson Guiomar =

Swedish footballer

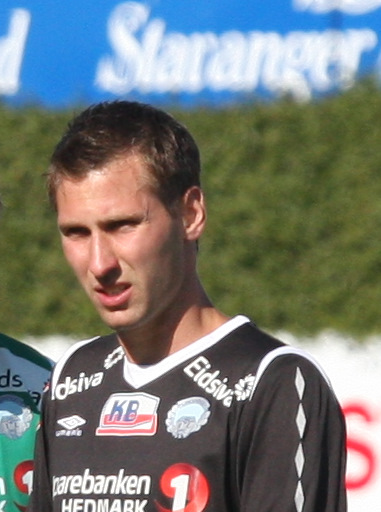
- Nilsson Guiomar in 2009

Personal information
- Full name: Johan Kristofer Nilsson Guiomar
- Date of birth: 15 March 1985 (age 41)
- Place of birth: Sweden
- Height: 1.88 m (6 ft 2 in)
- Position: Defender

Youth career
- Eriksfälts FF

Senior career*
Years	Team	Apps	(Gls)
2003–2006	Malmö FF	6	(0)
2006	→ Mjällby AIF (loan)	5	(0)
2007–2009	Kongsvinger IL	60	(2)
2010–2012	Trelleborgs FF	43	(0)
Total		114	(2)

International career
2002	Sweden U17	10	(0)
2003	Sweden U19	11	(1)
2004	Sweden U21	1	(0)
- * Club domestic league appearances and goals as of 13 January 2012

Johan Kristofer Nilsson Guiomar (born 15 March 1985) is a Swedish former professional footballer who played as a defender.
