= Hans Blomqvist =

Swedish footballer

Personal information
- Date of birth: 17 March 1975
- Height: 1.72 m (5 ft 8 in)
- Position: Forward

Youth career
- Göteborgs FF

Senior career*
Years	Team	Apps	(Gls)
1994–2002	Västra Frölunda IF		
2003	IFK Göteborg		
2003	→ Västra Frölunda IF (loan)		
2004–2005	GAIS		
2006	Masthuggets BK		
- * Club domestic league appearances and goals

Hans Blomqvist (born 17 March 1975) is a Swedish retired football forward.

Breaking through for Västra Frölunda IF, he was awarded the Swedish football Newcomer of the Year for 1998.
