= Yksel Osmanovski =

Swedish footballer

Personal information
- Date of birth: 24 February 1977 (age 49)
- Place of birth: Malmö, Sweden
- Height: 1.74 m (5 ft 9 in)
- Positions: Winger; striker

Team information
- Current team: Malmö FF (U21 coach)

Youth career
- 1982–1984: Malmö BI
- 1985–1986: IFK Malmö
- 1987–1995: Malmö FF

Senior career*
Years	Team	Apps	(Gls)
1995–1998	Malmö FF	58	(16)
1998–2001	Bari	85	(14)
2001–2003	Torino	29	(1)
2002	→ Bordeaux (loan)	7	(0)
2004–2007	Malmö FF	45	(5)
Total		217	(36)

International career
1996–1999	Sweden U21	18	(6)
1998–2006	Sweden	15	(2)
- * Club domestic league appearances and goals

Yksel Osmanovski (Turkish: Yüksel Osmanoğlu; born 24 February 1977) is a Swedish former professional footballer who played as a striker. Starting off his career with Malmö FF in the 1995, he went on to represent Bari, Torino, and Bordeaux before retiring at Malmö FF in 2007. A full international between 1998 and 2006, he won 15 caps and scored two goals for the Sweden national team. He represented his country at UEFA Euro 2000.

== Early life ==
Born in Skrävlinge, Malmö, Osmanovski grew up in Rosengård, where fellow Swedish footballer Zlatan Ibrahimović also grew up. In an early interview, Zlatan said that "within a few years, I will play in Italy, and eventually the national team. I want to follow in Yksel's footsteps. We know each other, even if he is four years older than me. I got his autograph when he started playing for Malmö FF, when I played in Malmö BI. When he came to Rosengård and played and dribbled with us kids, we were all shouting "Yksel, Yksel, Yksel!" - Ibrahimović, in 2000.

== Club career ==
Osmanovski played for Malmö BI and IFK Malmö as a child, but joined Malmö FF in 1987 where he eventually made his debut in 1995. He gradually became a star in the Swedish league, and was bought by Italian Serie A outfit Bari. After three seasons he moved on to Torino, but struggled to capture a first team place. He had a loan spell at Bordeaux, where he was on the bench when they won the 2002 Coupe de la Ligue Final, before returning to Malmö FF in 2004. There he was part of the team that won the Allsvenskan league title, although Osmanovski himself did not receive a winner's medal, because he took part in too few matches. Still he played the crucial role, in stopping a ball on the goal line against title rivals Halmstad BK. Had it gone in, Malmö would certainly not won the league title, but thanks to a 2–2 draw, they kept themselves within a shot.

In February 2008, Osmanovski announced his retirement from professional football, having not had his contract with Malmö renewed.

== International career ==
Osmanovski was the first Muslim to represent Sweden. He played 15 international matches. and was a squad player for Sweden at UEFA Euro 2000 where he played in the group stage games against Italy and Turkey.

== Coaching career ==
On 14 January 2013, it was announced that Osmanovski would return to football, working as U21 coach for his previous club Malmö FF.

== Career statistics ==
=== International ===
Appearances and goals by national team and year
National team	Year	Apps	Goals
Sweden	1997	1	0
Sweden	1998	3	0
Sweden	1999	2	2
Sweden	2000	5	0
Sweden	2001	4	0
Sweden	2002	0	0
Sweden	2003	0	0
Sweden	2004	0	0
Sweden	2005	0	0
Sweden	2006	1	0
Total		15	2

Scores and results list Sweden's goal tally first, score column indicates score after each Osmanovski goal.

List of international goals scored by Yksel Osmanovski
No.	Date	Venue	Opponent	Score	Result	Competition
1	27 May 1999	Råsunda stadion, Solna, Sweden	Jamaica	1–0	2–1	Friendly
2	27 May 1999	Råsunda stadion, Solna, Sweden	Jamaica	2–0	2–1	Friendly

== Honours ==
Malmö FF

- Allsvenskan: 2004
