= Petter Furuseth =

Norwegian footballer (born 1978)

Petter Furuseth Olsen
Personal information
- Date of birth: 14 August 1978 (age 48)
- Place of birth: Tønsberg, Norway
- Height: 1.80 m (5 ft 11 in)
- Position: Midfielder

Team information
- Current team: Husøy & Foynland

Youth career
- 1985–1996: IL Flint

Senior career*
Years	Team	Apps	(Gls)
1996–2000	Eik-Tønsberg	68	(3)
2001–2003	Brann	75	(20)
2004	Örebro	16	(4)
2004–2006	Hammarby IF	57	(6)
2007	Stabæk	4	(0)
2007	Viborg	17	(2)
2008	FC Midtjylland	16	(2)
2009–2010	Lyn	7	(0)
2009	→ Assyriska (loan)	5	(0)
2010–2011	Hammarby IF	39	(3)
2012	Moss		
2012	Eik-Tønsberg		
2013–	Husøy & Foynland		
- * Club domestic league appearances and goals

Petter Furuseth (born 14 August 1978) is a Norwegian former professional footballer who played as a midfielder in the top-flight in Norway, Sweden and Denmark. He used to be known as Petter Furuseth Olsen. Furuseth represented Norway at youth international level.

Furuseth started his career in the local club Eik-Tønsberg, before he played for Brann, Örebro, Hammarby, Stabæk, Viborg and FC Midtjylland. Furuseth announced his retirement from football in August 2008, but made a comeback five months later in Lyn. He later had spell with Swedish clubs Assyriska and Hammarby, before he returned to Norway where he has been playing and coaching at amateur level.

== Career ==
Furuseth was born in Tønsberg, and played for the local team IL Flint during his youth. He played four matches for the Norwegian under-15 team in 1994, and one match for the under-16 the next year.

Furuseth transferred to the Norwegian First Division side Eik-Tønsberg in 1996. He played his first matches for Eik in 1997, and played a total of 68 league-games for the club. After Eik was relegated in 2000, Furuseth transferred to SK Brann. He made his debut in Tippeligaen against Moss on 16 April 2001, and scored a total of 10 goals in 26 games in his first season at Brann.

Furuseth stayed in Brann for three seasons, before he moved to Sweden and Örebro SK. During the first half of the 2004 season, Olsen was a great attraction in the Allsvenskan, and it did not take long until he caught the eye of Hammarby. In September 2004, a Örebro in heavy debts was forced to sell him to league rivals Hammarby IF. In Stockholm, Furuseth Olsen was transformed from striker to right winger, and was awarded "Player of the year 2006" by the Hammarby-fans. In October 2006, Furuseth Olsen made it clear that if he were to leave Hammarby and Sweden, he would return to Norway to gain a spot on the Norway national team.

He transferred to Stabæk Fotball ahead of the 2007-season, but because of a conflict with Daniel Nannskog and the other players, he only played 4 matches for Stabæk and signed for the Danish Viborg in June 2007. The following winter, Furuseth transferred to FC Midtjylland, but after three rounds of the 2008–09-season he asked to be released the contract and decided to retire.

Furuseth decided to make comeback in January 2009, and signed a two-year contract with Lyn. He was transferred from FC Midtjylland, still formally his employer, for an undisclosed fee. Furuseth played only two matches for Lyn in Tippeligaen during the first half of the season, and he was loaned out to Assyriska so that Lyn, a club with mayor economic difficulties, could save some wage-expenses. On 10 March 2010, his contract with Lyn was terminated by mutual consent, and Furuseth moved back to Hammarby.

Furuseth moved back to Norway again, and was signed by Moss as a playing assistant coach in February 2012, where he was working under the command of Tor Thodesen, the coach who signed Furuseth from Eik-Tønsberg to Brann in 2000. Furuseth left Moss in August 2012, citing personal reasons, and joined his old club Eik in the Third Division two weeks later, where he was a part of the coaching staff. Ahead of the 2013 season, Furuseth joined Husøy & Foynland IF as a player-coach.
