= Erik Johansson (footballer, born 1976) =

Swedish footballer

Personal information
- Full name: Erik Johansson
- Date of birth: 18 May 1976 (age 50)
- Place of birth: Sweden
- Height: 1.79 m (5 ft 10 in)
- Position: Midfielder

Senior career*
Years	Team	Apps	(Gls)
1994–2001	Örgryte		
2001–2004	Malmö FF	68	(10)
2004–2007	Hammarby	44	(6)
- * Club domestic league appearances and goals as of 21 July 2016

Erik "Samba-Erik" Johansson (born 18 May 1976) is a Swedish retired football midfielder who played for Örgryte, Malmö and Hammarby IF.

He has a child named Elias Johansson.
