= Peter Olofsson (footballer) =

Swedish footballer

Personal information
- Full name: Carl Peter Göran Olofsson
- Date of birth: 10 November 1975 (age 50)
- Place of birth: Vännäs
- Position: Midfielder

Senior career*
Years	Team	Apps	(Gls)
1991–1993	Vännäs AIK		
1994–2000	Umeå FC		
2000–2002	Bryne FK	53	(14)
2003–2005	GIF Sundsvall		
2006–2008	BK Häcken		
- * Club domestic league appearances and goals

Peter Olofsson (born 10 November 1975) is a Swedish retired football midfielder.
