= Tom Prahl =

Swedish footballer and manager

Personal information
- Full name: Tom Göran Roland Prahl
- Date of birth: 5 January 1949 (age 77)
- Place of birth: Smedstorp, Sweden
- Height: 1.79 m (5 ft 10 in)

Senior career*
Years	Team	Apps	(Gls)
1965–1968	Onslunda IF		
1968–1971	Tomelilla IF		

Managerial career
- 1972–1975: Onslunda IF
- 1976: IFK Trelleborg
- 1977–1978: Onslunda IF
- 1979–1981: IFK Kristianstad
- 1982–1989: Kirsebergs IF
- 1990–1995: Trelleborgs FF
- 1996–2001: Halmstads BK
- 2002–2005: Malmö FF
- 2006: Viking FK
- 2007–2011: Trelleborgs FF
- * Club domestic league appearances and goals

Tom Göran Roland Prahl (born 5 January 1949 in Smedstorp) is a Swedish former football player and manager.

== Coaching career ==
From 1990 to the 2000s, Prahl was one of Sweden's most successful managers, winning three league titles. He debuted in 1992 in Allsvenskan with Trelleborgs FF. He won the league since then with both Malmö FF and Halmstads BK. On 1 January 2006, he took over Viking from Roy Hodgson. However, his spell with the Stavanger-based club proved unsuccessful, and he was fired in September 2006 on the back of seven losses in eight league matches, with the team on the bottom of the Norwegian Premier League table. Prahl returned to Trelleborg and managed the club until his retirement in 2011.

== Honours as manager ==
Halmstads BK

- Allsvenskan: 1997, 2000

Malmö FF

- Allsvenskan: 2004
