= Raoul Kouakou =

Ivorian footballer (born 1980)

Personal information
- Full name: Raoul Kouakou
- Date of birth: 3 January 1980 (age 46)
- Place of birth: Abidjan, Ivory Coast
- Position: Defender

Youth career
- JC Abidjan

Senior career*
| Years | Team | Apps | (Gls) |
| 2000 | ASEC Abidjan | | |
| 2001 | Stade Abidjan | | |
| 2002–2005 | Sogndal | 49 | (2) |
| 2005–2007 | Malmö FF | 6 | (1) |
| 2006 | → Viborg FF (loan) | 8 | (1) |
| 2007 | Sandefjord | 0 | (0) |

International career
| | Ivory Coast | 4 | (0) |
- * Club domestic league appearances and goals

Raoul Kouakou (born 3 January 1980 in Abidjan) is an Ivorian former footballer who played as a defender.

== Career ==
During his time in Malmö FF he got the nickname Göken (Swedish for the cuckoo). In a 2006 game against Hammarby IF (his 6th game in the Swedish first league), he scored an own goal and accidentally head butted teammate Christian Järdler, who ended up with a fractured cheekbone.

After his transfer to Sandefjord Fotball in 2007, a knee injury stopped him from playing. Sandefjord claims that Raouls previous club, Malmö FF, withheld information about this injury when the transfer took place. In May 2010 FIFA ruled in favor of MFF and Sandefjord had to pay the transfer fee to Malmö. While playing in Norway he was dubbed Røde Raoul (Red Raoul) by the tabloid media due to his many red cards.

== International career ==
He has 4 caps for the national team, but was not called up to the 2006 World Cup.
