= Henrik Nilsson (footballer) =

Swedish footballer (born 1972)

Personal information
- Full name: Lars Henrik Nilsson
- Date of birth: 25 July 1972 (age 54)
- Place of birth: Sweden
- Position: Defender

Senior career*
Years	Team	Apps	(Gls)
1991–1995	Malmö FF	91	(1)
1996–1998	IFK Hässleholm		
1999–2004	Landskrona BoIS		

International career
1987–1988	Sweden U17	26	(0)
1989–1991	Sweden U19	12	(0)
1992–1993	Sweden U21/O	10	(0)
- * Club domestic league appearances and goals

Lars Henrik Nilsson (born 25 July 1972) is a Swedish former footballer who played as a defender. He represented Sweden at the 1992 Summer Olympics in Barcelona.
