= Andreas Yngvesson =

Swedish footballer

Personal information
- Full name: Leif Mikael Andreas Yngvesson
- Date of birth: 18 August 1974 (age 52)
- Place of birth: Sundsvall, Sweden
- Height: 1.84 m (6 ft 0 in)
- Position: Forward

Youth career
- 1979–1994: Alnö IF

Senior career*
Years	Team	Apps	(Gls)
1995–1996	GIF Sundsvall		
1997–1998	AIK	16	(1)
1998–2001	GIF Sundsvall	38	(10)
2002–2005	Malmö FF	78	(12)
2005–2006	Landskrona BoIS	24	(1)
Total		156	(24)
- * Club domestic league appearances and goals

Leif Mikael Andreas Yngvesson (born 18 August 1974) is a Swedish former professional footballer who played as a forward.
