= Thomas Olsson =

Swedish footballer

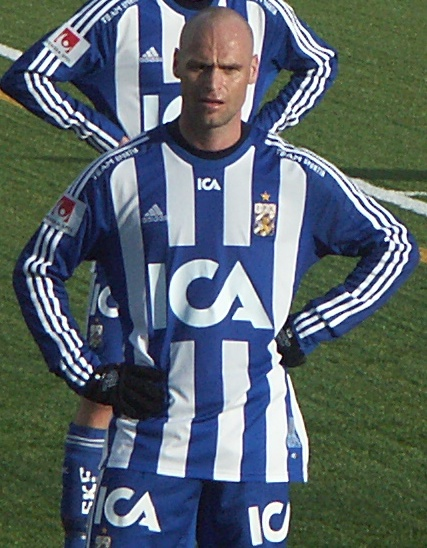

Personal information
- Full name: Thomas Lars Olof Olsson
- Date of birth: 15 February 1976 (age 50)
- Place of birth: Åtvidaberg, Sweden
- Height: 1.74 m (5 ft 9 in)
- Position: Midfielder

Senior career*
Years	Team	Apps	(Gls)
1993–1997	Åtvidabergs FF	95	(7)
1998–2002	IFK Norrköping	86	(9)
2003–2005	Malmö FF	53	(3)
2006–2011	IFK Göteborg	98	(16)
2011	→ Åtvidabergs FF (loan)	8	(1)
2012	Särö IK	3	(1)
2013–2014	Mölnlycke IS	17	(9)
- * Club domestic league appearances and goals

Thomas Lars Olof Olsson (born 15 February 1976) is a Swedish former professional footballer who played as a midfielder. His last professional club was IFK Göteborg. After playing for the local club Åtvidabergs FF, he joined IFK Norrköping in 1998. In 2003, he joined Malmö FF with which he has won one Swedish championship. He moved on to IFK Göteborg before the 2006 season, and was a key player there during their gold season 2007. Olsson retired from professional football after the 2011 season.

== Honours ==
Malmö FF

- Allsvenskan: 2004

IFK Göteborg

- Allsvenskan: 2007
- Svenska Cupen: 2008

Individual

- Årets Ärkeängel: 2011
