= Glenn Holgersson =

Swedish footballer

Glenn Holgersson (born 5 November 1979) is a Swedish former footballer, last playing for FC Rosengård.

== Career ==
He has primarily played left back or centre back. He played for Kirseberg IF, Malmö FF, Höllvikens GIF and IFK Malmö, before joining Malmö FF for a second time. From 2006 to 2009 he played for Örebro SK; he then joined FC Rosengård.
