= Mattias Asper =

Swedish footballer (born 1974)

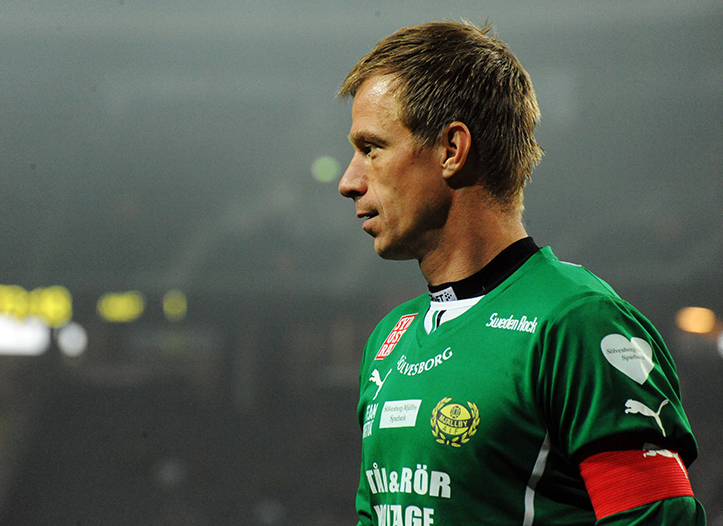
- Mattias Asper in May 2014

Personal information
- Full name: Nils Mattias Joacim Asper
- Date of birth: 20 March 1974 (age 52)
- Place of birth: Sölvesborg, Sweden
- Height: 1.98 m (6 ft 6 in)
- Position: Goalkeeper

Team information
- Current team: Kristianstad FC (head coach)

Senior career*
| Years | Team | Apps | (Gls) |
| 1993–1997 | Mjällby AIF | 98 | (0) |
| 1998–2000 | AIK | 60 | (0) |
| 2000–2002 | Real Sociedad | 10 | (0) |
| 2002 | → Beşiktaş (loan) | 8 | (0) |
| 2002–2006 | Malmö FF | 100 | (0) |
| 2006 | Viking FK | 10 | (0) |
| 2007 | IF Brommapojkarna | 6 | (0) |
| 2008–2015 | Mjällby AIF | 232 | (1) |
| Total | | 524 | (1) |

International career
| 1999–2002 | Sweden | 3 | (0) |

Managerial career
- 2016: Mjällby AIF (caretaker)
- 2024–: Kristianstad FC
- * Club domestic league appearances and goals

Nils Mattias Joacim Asper (born 20 March 1974) is a Swedish football manager and former player who played as a goalkeeper. He is currently the head coach of Division 2 club Kristianstad FC. Starting off his career with Mjällby AIF in the mid-1990s, he went on to play professionally in Spain, Turkey, and Norway before returning to Mjällby in 2008. A full international between 1999 and 2002, he won three caps for the Sweden men's national football team and was a squad member for them at UEFA Euro 2000.

== Club career ==
Asper was the first choice goalkeeper for Mjällby AIF in four seasons before signing to the Allsvenskan side AIK in 1998. Lee Baxter began the 1998 season as the first choice. But after seven games AIK had only managed to collect seven points, including only one win. On the 8 of June, Asper made his debut against Östers IF putting Lee Baxter on the bench, which would last for the rest of the season. With Asper in the net, AIK did not lose a single game in the 1998 season and they also won Allsvenskan the same year.

In 1999, AIK qualified for Champions League making it all the way to the group stage. This year, Asper held a clean sheet for 797 minutes in Allsvenskan which was a new record.

His performances in AIK attracted interest from Spanish club Real Sociedad, who bought him just before the 2000-01 season. However, he did not have much of a success in Spain and eventually returned to Sweden and Malmö FF in 2002, after being on loan to Beşiktaş J.K. He won the Swedish championship with Malmö FF in 2004.

He announced his retirement on 26 November 2014.

== International career ==
Asper made his international debut for Sweden on 27 November 1999 in a friendly game away against South Africa, replacing Magnus Kihlstedt at halftime. He made his second appearance for Sweden on 29 March 2000 in a friendly game away against Austria. He was selected for Sweden's UEFA Euro 2000 squad, and served as third-choice goalkeeper behind Magnus Hedman and Magnus Kihlstedt as Sweden was eliminated after the group stage. He won his third and last international cap in a friendly game against Russia away on 21 August 2002.

== Honours ==
AIK

- Allsvenskan: 1998
- Svenska Cupen: 1998–99

Malmö FF

- Allsvenskan: 2004

Individual

- Swedish Goalkeeper of the Year: 1998, 1999
