= Olof Persson =

Swedish footballer (born 1978)

Personal information
- Full name: Olof Gösta Anton Persson
- Date of birth: 5 May 1978 (age 48)
- Place of birth: Malmö, Sweden
- Height: 1.87 m (6 ft 2 in)
- Position: Centre-back

Team information
- Current team: Malmö FF (assistant coach)

Senior career*
Years	Team	Apps	(Gls)
1995	Oxie IF		
1995–2001	Malmö FF	103	(8)
2002	FC Tirol	4	(0)
2002–2006	Malmö FF	107	(3)
2006–2008	AGF	0	(0)
Total		214	(11)

International career
1993–1994	Sweden U17	14	(2)
1995	Sweden U19	7	(0)
1997–1999	Sweden U21	15	(0)
2001–2006	Sweden	4	(0)

Managerial career
- 2009–2010: FC Rosengård (assistant coach)
- 2010–2012: FC Rosengård
- 2012–2013: FC Höllviken
- 2014–: Malmö FF (assistant coach)
- * Club domestic league appearances and goals

Olof Gösta Anton Persson (born 5 May 1978) is a Swedish football manager and the current assistant coach of Malmö FF in Allsvenskan. Persson also played professionally as a central defender, most notably for Malmö FF. A full international between 2001 and 2006, he won four caps for the Sweden national team.

== Club career ==
Persson played in central defence and had considerable aerial power. He played the majority of his career at Swedish club Malmö FF, he reached around 350 matches for the club and won the 2004 Allsvenskan. This is also where the current sports chief in AGF, Brian Steen Nielsen, as a player met Persson. Persson left Malmö FF after clashing with his coach, Sören Åkeby, who, incidentally, is a former coach of AGF. In his season at FC Tirol, Persson was a part of a team that won the Austrian Bundesliga — shortly followed by the club's bankruptcy. When Persson arrived at AGF, he was hailed as the new master of a very fragile defence, but after a few weeks he ruptured his ligament and he was never able to play an official match for the club before he retired from professional football on 4 September 2008.

== International career ==
Persson represented the Sweden U17, U19, and U21 teams before making his full international debut on 1 February 2001 in a friendly game against Finland. He made two more international appearances in friendlies against Mexico and the Czech Republic in 2005 before winning his fourth and ultimately last international cap in a friendly against Jordan on 23 January 2006.

== Honours ==
FC Tirol

- Austrian Football Bundesliga: 2002

Malmö FF

- Allsvenskan: 2004
