= Jon Inge Høiland =

Norwegian footballer (born 1977)

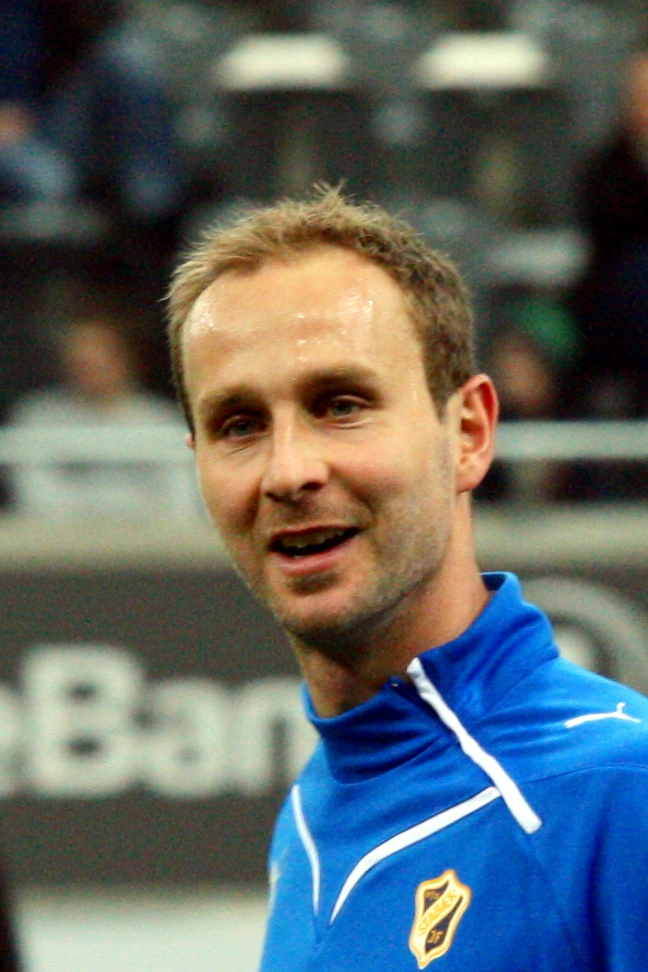

Personal information
- Full name: Jon Inge Høiland
- Date of birth: 20 September 1977 (age 49)
- Place of birth: Fåberg, Norway
- Height: 1.87 m (6 ft 2 in)
- Positions: Defender; right back

Youth career
- 1985–1995: Faaberg

Senior career*
Years	Team	Apps	(Gls)
1995–1996	Bryne	24	(2)
1997–1998	Kongsvinger	45	(0)
1999–2002	IFK Göteborg	92	(4)
2003–2007	Malmö FF	90	(9)
2006	→ 1. FC Kaiserslautern (loan)	9	(0)
2007–2010	Stabæk	76	(8)
2011–2013	Rosenborg	37	(0)
2014	Stabæk	23	(3)
Total		396	(26)

International career
2004–2010	Norway	25	(1)
- * Club domestic league appearances and goals

Jon Inge Høiland (born 20 September 1977) is a Norwegian former professional footballer who played as a defender. He has been capped 25 times while playing for Norway.

Høiland played for Bryne and Kongsvinger in Norway, before he moved to the Swedish side IFK Göteborg in 1999. He stayed in Sweden until 2007, except for a spell on loan with 1. FC Kaiserslautern in 2006, and won the Allsvenskan with Malmö FF in 2004. He returned to Norway in 2007 when he signed for Stabæk, and was a part of the team that won the 2008 Tippeligaen. After playing for Rosenborg between 2011 and 2013, Høiland returned to Stabæk ahead of the 2014 season.

== Club career ==
Høiland was born and grew up in Fåberg, outside Lillehammer, and played for the local side during his youth Faaberg. At the age of eight he watched the semi-final of the 1985 Norwegian Football Cup where his brother Olav was played for the Faaberg-team that lost against Vålerenga. during his youth, before he left for Bryne in 1995. After two seasons with the club, he joined Kongsvinger where he played for two seasons before he travelled to the Swedish club IFK Göteborg ahead of the 1999 season, which was one of the biggest club in Scandinavia. In his two first seasons in Sweden, the club finished fourth in Allsvenskan, before they finished sixth in the 2001 season. IFK Göteborg were struggling in the bottom half of the table in the 2002 season. Høiland's contract expired after that season and he was offered a sixth month contract with the English club Portsmouth, but chose to join Malmö FF as a free agent in January 2003, and signed a three-year contract with the club. He played 86 matches during his four seasons with IFK Göteborg

In his second season with the club he scored the decisive goal when Malmö claimed the 2004 Allsvenskan championship. When Niklas Skoog's penalty was saved by the goalkeeper, Høiland scored on the rebound, when Malmö won 1–0 against Elfsborg, while Halmstads BK who were leading the league ahead of the decisive match only managed a 1–1 draw against IFK Göteborg. Høiland was loaned out to the Bundesliga side 1. FC Kaiserslautern in January 2006, until the end of the 2005–06 Bundesliga season. The German side had an option to buy Høiland, but Høiland did not want to continue to play in the club that was relegated from Bundesliga. He returned to Malmö, but stated that his dream was to continue playing in one of the big leagues in Europe. In March 2005, Høiland signed a new three-year contract-extension with Malmö FF. He did however returned to Norway after eight years abroad in August 2007, when he transferred to Stabæk. In his first season with Stabæk, the club finished second. The next season, Stabæk won the Tippeligaen, with Høiland playing regularly at the right back. After winning a bronze-medal with Stabæk in the 2009 season, Høiland was used as a centre-back in the 2010 season. His contract with Stabæk expired after the 2010 season, and he followed head coach Jan Jönsson to Rosenborg where he became Jönsson's first signing as head coach of Rosenborg. Høiland signed a two-year-long contract with Rosenborg in December 2010.

Høiland made his debut for Rosenborg in the opening matches of the 2011 season against Brann. An ankle-injury in the fourth match of the season against Fredrikstad, made Høiland miss most of the season and did only make 10 appearances for his club. Towards the end of the 2012 season, Høiland signed a one-year contract extension with Rosenborg.

His family had bought a house at Snarøya during Høiland's first spell at Stabæk, and in February 2013 they decided that this was their last season in Trondheim. When the school started in August 2013 his family moved back to Snarøya, and Høiland asked Rosenborg if he was allowed to return to his old club Stabæk, but they did not want to let him go due to an injury on Per Verner Rønning. Høiland played for Rosenborg until his contract expired, and won a silver-medal as Rosenborg finished second in the 2013 Tippeligaen. Høiland's last match for Rosenborg was the 2013 Norwegian Football Cup Final, where they lost 4–2 against Molde. He started the match instead of the regular right-back Cristian Gamboa.

Høiland returned to Stabæk ahead of the 2014 season, and signed a two-year contract with the club. Stabæk had been promoted to the Tippeligaen in 2013, and Høiland stated that it would be hard to switch his mind-set to avoid relegation when he had won a medal in the league six of the last seven seasons.

== International career ==
Høiland represented his country at youth international level and played a total of 18 matches for different youth teams before he made his debut for the under-21 team against Iceland U21 in July 1997. He was a part of the Norwegian squad at the 1998 UEFA European Under-21 Football Championship, where the Norwegian team won bronze. He played a total of 14 matches for the under-21 team.

Høiland was one of the best right-backs in Sweden between 2001 and 2003, but was not called up to the Norway national football team which Nils Johan Semb was national team coach. Semb's successor, Åge Hareide did however name Høiland in his first national team squad in January 2004. Hareide later claimed that Høiland was a player he wanted to buy while he was manager of Helsingborgs IF because of his offensive abilities as a right-back and also said that Høiland soon would challenge Christer Basma as the right-back on the national team. Høiland made his debut for Norway in the friendly match against Sweden in January 2004. After appearing in three friendly matches, Høiland was chosen to play as a right back in the 2006 World Cup qualifier against Belarus in September 2005, after Basma made a poor performance in the previous match against Italy. Høiland then became the first-choice as right-back on the national team. He scored his first and only goal for Norway on 1 April 2009, in the 3–2 victory over Finland. He played his 25th game for Norway against Montenegro on 29 May 2010, and he was awarded the Gold Watch for this feat.

== Career statistics ==
=== Club ===
Season	Club	Division	League		Cup		Europe		Total	
Season	Club	Division	Apps	Goals	Apps	Goals	Apps	Goals	Apps	Goals
2007	Stabæk	Tippeligaen	3	1	0	0	0	0	3	1
2008	Stabæk	Tippeligaen	22	2	5	3	0	0	27	5
2009	Stabæk	Tippeligaen	24	3	3	0	1	0	28	3
2010	Stabæk	Tippeligaen	27	2	3	0	2	0	32	2
2011	Rosenborg	Tippeligaen	10	0	0	0	0	0	10	0
2012	Rosenborg	Tippeligaen	19	0	0	0	7	0	26	0
2013	Rosenborg	Tippeligaen	8	0	5	0	2	1	14	1
2014	Stabæk	Tippeligaen	23	3	2	0	0	0	25	3
Career total			136	11	18	3	12	1	166	15

=== International goals ===
#	Date	Venue	Opponent	Score	Result	Competition
1	1 April 2009	Ullevaal Stadion, Oslo	Finland	2 – 1	3–2 Win	Friendly

== Honours ==
Malmö FF

- Allsvenskan: 2004

Stabæk

- Tippeligaen: 2008

Norway

- Norwegian Football Association Gold Watch
