= Joakim Nilsson (footballer, born 1985) =

Swedish footballer

Joakim Nilsson (born 16 May 1985) is a Swedish retired footballer who played as a midfielder.

Nilsson played for Malmö FF from 1997 until 2009 when he signed for Trelleborg. He made his Allsvenskan debut for Malmö against Landskrona BoIS on 21 April 2003. He retired after playing the 2015 season for Trelleborg.
