= Gamla Ullevi (1916) =

Former football stadium in Gothenburg, Sweden

Coordinates: 57°42′21″N 11°58′51″E

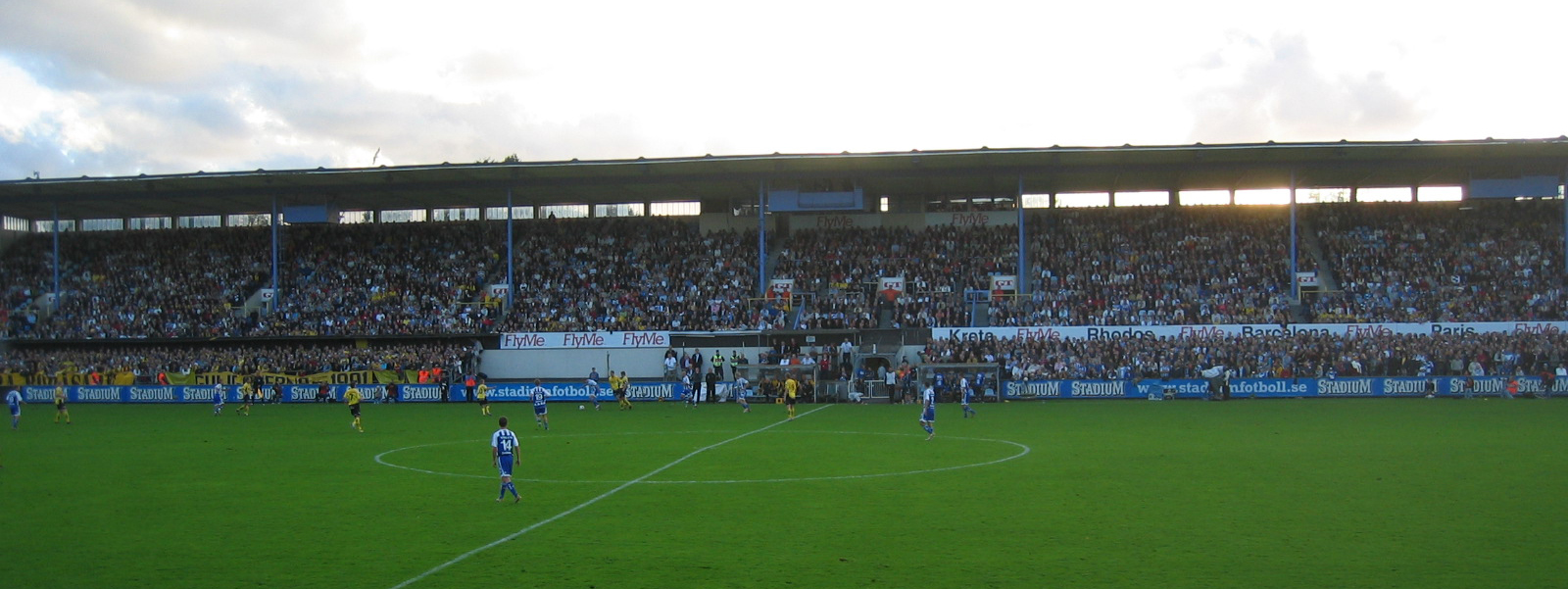
- Fotbollsallsvenskan game between IFK Göteborg and IF Elfsborg at Gamla Ullevi in August 2006
- Interactive map of Gamla Ullevi
- Full name: Gamla Ullevi
- Capacity: 15,000–18,000
- Field size: 105 x 68 m

Construction
- Built: 1915–1916
- Opened: 17 September 1916
- Demolished: 9 January 2007

Tenants
- GAIS; IFK Göteborg; Örgryte IS

Gamla Ullevi (Swedish pronunciation: [ˈɡâmːla ˈɵ̂lːɛˌviː], "Old Ullevi") was a football stadium in Gothenburg, Sweden. Named Ullevi until 1958 when Nya ("New") Ullevi opened, it was built in 1915–1916 and opened on 17 September 1916 with the game between IFK Göteborg-AB København (2–2). It had a capacity of 15,000 to 18,000, depending on usage.

The record attendance is 32,357 and was set 2 May 1957, when Örgryte IS played IF Elfsborg. IF Elfsborg won 2–1.

Demolition of Gamla Ullevi began on 9 January 2007 at 11.15 AM local time. The stadium has been replaced with a new football stadium. The new stadium, opened on 5 April 2009, has been named Gamla Ullevi as well.

== Name ==
Gamla Ullevi was named after the Nordic god Ull. He was a skier and archer who chased away the winter so he could wake up the goddess of the earth. The word vi means holy place. When Gamla Ullevi first opened it was called Ullervi, but after being pressured by a professor of Nordic languages, Hjalmar Lindroth, the r was removed. It was only added in the first place to make the name easier to pronounce. (Johansson & Nilsson 1992, p. 4)

== History ==
Before Ullevi, the location was called Idrottsplatsen. It was a velocipede arena with room for 600 spectators. Eventually other sports began to use the facilities and a tenniscourt was built in 1901. Other courts were added too, but a new football stadium was needed with a proper grass pitch because of the growing interest in football. Göteborgs idrottsförbund created a corporation that had a capital of 90 000kr to spend on a new arena. The end cost of Gamla Ullevi was 160 000kr. It was designed as a stadium for only football despite half-promises being made to the archers and equestrians about space. At that time, the finished arena could hold 12 000 spectators. (Johansson & Nilsson 1992, p. 6–7)

Ullevi became more than just an arena for football though. Next to the football pitch, the ice-skating rink was built and opened 6 January 1917 with a bandy match. Ice hockey and figure skating were two sports that also used the facilities, as well as boxing, fencing, handball, and tennis. (Johansson & Nilsson 1992)

In 1924, Gothenburg city became the owners of Gamla Ullevi. They closed it in 1934 for renovations where they added more seats for spectators, and reopened in 1935. (Öhnander 2002, p. 10) The opening match was between Örgryte IS and AIK (3–1). (Johansson & Nilsson 1992, p. 48)

After Nya Ullevi was opened, it became the home arena to the three football clubs (GAIS, IFK and ÖIS) but they moved back to Gamla Ullevi in 1992. (Öhnander 2002, p. 7)

=== Gottepojkarna ===
Giovanni Galligani was the leader of Gottepojkarna, the snack and drink providers during the match. They sold chocolate, bananas, biscuits and Ullevikolan (the Ullevi toffee). There was a main kiosk where all the snacks could be bought, but during the match Gottepojkarna walked around with metal boxes with each type of snack in a separate compartment. These boys had been trained so that when a spectator ordered something they could throw the snack to the customer. The change was also thrown back up and they always hit the right target. (Johansson & Nilsson 1992, p. 20)

=== Ullevi-Bladet ===
Ullevi-Bladet was the name of the match-program that could be bought. It cost 25 öre and was published by Idrottsjournalisternas Klubb (The Sport Journalists Club) but financed by advertisements. The magazine featured an introduction to the match, the line-up of both teams and the points-chart of Allsvenskan. (Öhnander 2002, p. 27)

== See also ==
- Scandinavium

== Gallery ==
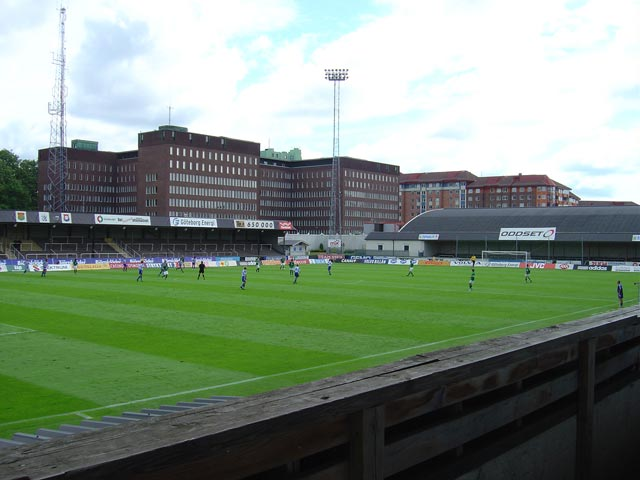
The home stand (on the left) and the away stand (on the right).

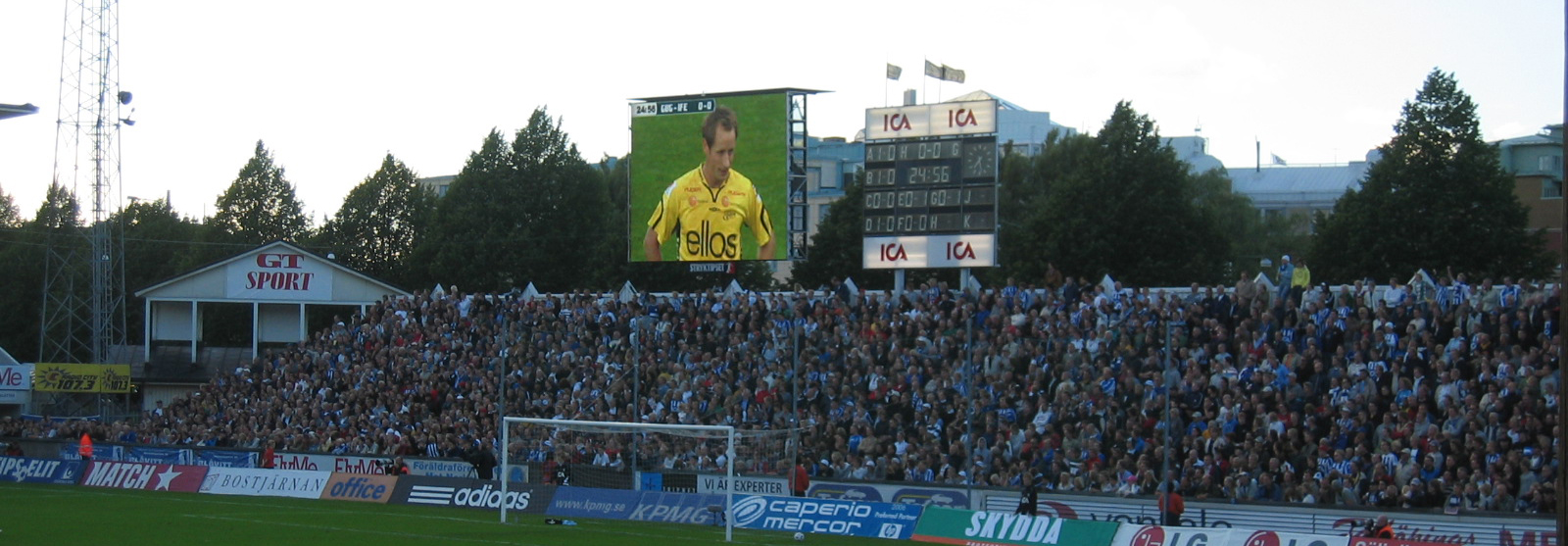
The north stand, scoreboard and TV screen.
