= 2004 Allsvenskan =

80th season of Allsvenskan

Allsvenskan
- Season: 2004
- Champions: Malmö FF
- Relegated: Örebro SK (financial reasons); AIK; Trelleborgs FF
- Champions League: Malmö FF
- UEFA Cup: Halmstads BK
- Matches: 182
- Goals: 443 (2.43 per match)
- Top goalscorer: Markus Rosenberg, Halmstads BK (14)
- Average attendance: 9,768

Allsvenskan 2004, part of the 2004 Swedish football season, was the 80th Allsvenskan season played. The first match was played 3 April 2004 and the last match was played 30 October 2004. Malmö FF won the league ahead of runners-up Halmstads BK, while AIK and Trelleborgs FF were relegated.

== Summary ==
- Djurgårdens IF announced in early November 2003 that the club would move its home games to Råsunda Stadium from 2004.
- The game Hammarby IF-Malmö FF (0–0) was played in front of 15 626 spectators at Söderstadion in Stockholm on Tuesday, 6 April 2004. Following the game, a group of Malmö FF supporters were given mass media publicity for using a banner where three deceased well-known Hammarby IF-personalities were mocked.
- Following riots during the game Hammarby IF-AIK (1-1) on Monday, 18 October at Råsunda Stadium AIK was required to play the home game against Örgryte IS on 24 October 2004 at the same stadium without any spectators. AIK lost, 0–3, and were relegated from Allsvenskan. Sportbladet's Lasse Sandlin described the atmosphere at the empty stadium as the "Valley of the Shadow of Death".
- On Friday 5 November, the competition committee of the Swedish Football Association met to discuss debates regarding too many non-EU players. Örgryte IS was stripped on one point from the game GIF Sundsvall–Örgryte IS, which was played on 18 April 2004 and originally ended in a 1–1 draw. The result was changed, instead giving the victory to GIF Sundsvall, 3–0. The decision was criticised for changing the table following the end of the season. Malmö FF was involved in a similar decision, but not stripped on any points.

== Participating clubs ==
| Club | Last season | First season in league | First season of current spell |
|---|---|---|---|
| AIK | 5th | 1924–25 | 1981 |
| Djurgårdens IF | 1st | 1927–28 | 2001 |
| IF Elfsborg | 10th | 1926–27 | 1997 |
| IFK Göteborg | 7th | 1924–25 | 1977 |
| Halmstads BK | 9th | 1933–34 | 1993 |
| Hammarby IF | 2nd | 1924–25 | 1998 |
| Helsingborgs IF | 6th | 1924–25 | 1993 |
| Kalmar FF | 1st (Superettan) | 1949–50 | 2004 |
| Landskrona BoIS | 11th | 1924–25 | 2002 |
| Malmö FF | 3rd | 1931–32 | 2001 |
| GIF Sundsvall | 12th | 1965 | 2000 |
| Trelleborgs FF | 2nd (Superettan) | 1985 | 2004 |
| Örebro SK | 8th | 1946–47 | 1989 |
| Örgryte IS | 4th | 1924–25 | 1995 |

Location of the 2004 Allsvenskan teams

== League table ==
| Pos | Team | Pld | W | D | L | GF | GA | GD | Pts | Qualification or relegation |
|---|---|---|---|---|---|---|---|---|---|---|
| 1 | Malmö FF (C) | 26 | 15 | 7 | 4 | 44 | 21 | +23 | 52 | Qualification to Champions League second qualifying round |
| 2 | Halmstads BK | 26 | 14 | 8 | 4 | 53 | 27 | +26 | 50 | Qualification to UEFA Cup second qualifying round |
| 3 | IFK Göteborg | 26 | 14 | 5 | 7 | 33 | 20 | +13 | 47 | Qualification to Intertoto Cup first round |
| 4 | Djurgårdens IF | 26 | 11 | 8 | 7 | 38 | 32 | +6 | 41 | Qualification to UEFA Cup second qualifying round (Note: Djurgården qualified for the UEFA Cup as Svenska Cupen champions 2004.) |
| 5 | Kalmar FF | 26 | 10 | 10 | 6 | 27 | 18 | +9 | 40 | |
| 6 | Hammarby IF | 26 | 10 | 7 | 9 | 28 | 28 | 0 | 37 | |
| 7 | GIF Sundsvall | 26 | 9 | 7 | 10 | 30 | 29 | +1 | 34 | |
| 8 | Örebro SK (R) | 26 | 9 | 6 | 11 | 32 | 45 | −13 | 33 | Relegation to Superettan (Note: After the 2004 season, The Swedish FA licensing committee denied Örebro the licence needed to play in Allsvenskan the next season due to the club's economic situation and they were thus relegated to Superettan 2005. Assyriska Föreningen were promoted in place of Örebro.) |
| 9 | IF Elfsborg | 26 | 8 | 8 | 10 | 25 | 32 | −7 | 32 | |
| 10 | Helsingborgs IF | 26 | 7 | 9 | 10 | 41 | 33 | +8 | 30 | |
| 11 | Landskrona BoIS | 26 | 7 | 9 | 10 | 27 | 33 | −6 | 30 | |
| 12 | Örgryte IS (O) | 26 | 6 | 9 | 11 | 24 | 35 | −11 | 27 | Qualification to Relegation play-offs |
| 13 | AIK (R) | 26 | 5 | 10 | 11 | 23 | 35 | −12 | 25 | Relegation to Superettan |
| 14 | Trelleborgs FF (R) | 26 | 2 | 7 | 17 | 18 | 55 | −37 | 13 | Relegation to Superettan |

Source: svenskfotboll.se (in Swedish)
Rules for classification: 1) points; 2) goal difference; 3) number of goals scored.
(C) Champions; (O) Play-off winners; (R) Relegated

== Results ==
| Home \ Away | AIK | DIF | IFE | IFKG | HBK | HAM | HEL | KFF | LBoIS | MFF | GIFS | TFF | ÖSK | ÖIS |
|---|---|---|---|---|---|---|---|---|---|---|---|---|---|---|
| AIK | | 1–1 | 1–1 | 3–1 | 0–2 | 0–1 | 2–2 | 1–1 | 1–3 | 0–2 | 1–0 | 0–0 | 1–2 | 0–3 |
| Djurgårdens IF | 3–1 | | 3–2 | 1–2 | 1–1 | 1–0 | 2–1 | 0–3 | 1–1 | 0–2 | 3–1 | 5–0 | 5–1 | 2–1 |
| IF Elfsborg | 1–0 | 0–0 | | 1–0 | 1–1 | 0–1 | 1–1 | 0–1 | 1–1 | 1–5 | 3–1 | 3–1 | 3–0 | 1–2 |
| IFK Göteborg | 1–0 | 2–0 | 3–0 | | 0–0 | 0–1 | 2–1 | 1–0 | 1–1 | 1–2 | 0–1 | 2–0 | 1–0 | 4–0 |
| Halmstads BK | 1–2 | 2–2 | 3–0 | 1–1 | | 2–1 | 3–2 | 1–0 | 5–3 | 2–2 | 1–0 | 1–0 | 5–0 | 2–2 |
| Hammarby IF | 1–1 | 3–0 | 1–0 | 1–2 | 1–1 | | 2–1 | 0–3 | 3–1 | 0–0 | 1–0 | 0–1 | 1–1 | 0–1 |
| Helsingborgs IF | 3–0 | 1–1 | 4–0 | 1–2 | 1–2 | 3–1 | | 1–2 | 0–1 | 0–2 | 1–0 | 2–0 | 0–0 | 3–0 |
| Kalmar FF | 1–1 | 1–1 | 0–1 | 0–0 | 1–3 | 1–2 | 0–0 | | 1–1 | 1–0 | 2–1 | 2–0 | 0–1 | 1–1 |
| Landskrona BoIS | 0–1 | 2–0 | 0–0 | 0–1 | 0–4 | 0–0 | 1–1 | 0–2 | | 2–1 | 3–2 | 4–0 | 0–1 | 0–2 |
| Malmö FF | 0–0 | 2–0 | 1–0 | 1–0 | 2–1 | 4–3 | 1–1 | 0–0 | 0–1 | | 0–0 | 4–2 | 5–1 | 1–0 |
| GIF Sundsvall | 1–1 | 0–1 | 0–0 | 2–1 | 1–0 | 2–0 | 3–3 | 0–1 | 0–0 | 3–2 | | 1–0 | 1–0 | 3–0 |
| Trelleborgs FF | 1–3 | 2–2 | 0–1 | 2–3 | 0–4 | 2–2 | 1–6 | 0–0 | 2–1 | 1–1 | 1–1 | | 1–2 | 1–1 |
| Örebro SK | 2–1 | 0–2 | 2–2 | 0–0 | 2–5 | 1–2 | 3–1 | 1–2 | 2–0 | 1–2 | 3–3 | 3–0 | | 1–0 |
| Örgryte IS | 1–1 | 0–1 | 0–2 | 1–2 | 2–0 | 0–0 | 1–1 | 1–1 | 1–1 | 0–2 | 1–3 | 1–0 | 2–2 | |

Source: Swedish Football Association (in Swedish)
Legend: Blue = home team win; Yellow = draw; Red = away team win.

== Relegation play-offs ==
3 November 2004
19:00

| Assyriska FF | 2–1 | Örgryte IS |
|---|---|---|
| Isakovic 5'; Samura 51' | | Paulinho 41' |

Bårsta IP, Södertälje
Attendance: 5,242
Referee: Martin Hansson (Holmsjö)

7 November 2004
13:10

| Örgryte IS | 1–0 | Assyriska FF |
|---|---|---|
| Guðmundsson 90' |

Gamla Ullevi, Gothenburg
Attendance: 7,485
Referee: Stefan Johannesson (Stocksund)

2–2 on aggregate. Örgryte IS won on away goals.

== Season statistics ==
=== Top scorers ===
| Rank | Player | Club | Goals |
|---|---|---|---|
| 1 | (Sweden) Markus Rosenberg | Halmstads BK | 14 |
| 2 | (Brazil) Afonso Alves | Malmö FF | 12 |
| 3 | (Sweden) Andreas Johansson | Djurgårdens IF | 11 |
| 4 | (Brazil) Dedé Anderson | Kalmar FF | 10 |
| 4 | (Denmark) Peter Graulund | Helsingborgs IF | 10 |
| 4 | (Nigeria) Peter Ijeh | IFK Göteborg | 10 |
| 4 | (Sweden) Sharbel Touma | Halmstads BK | 10 |
| 8 | (Sweden) Mattias Lindström | Helsingborgs IF | 9 |
| 8 | (Sweden) Jonas Wallerstedt | GIF Sundsvall | 9 |
| 10 | (Brazil) Aílton Almeida | Örgryte IS | 8 |
| 10 | (Sweden) Hasse Berggren | IF Elfsborg | 8 |
| 10 | (Sweden) Niklas Skoog | Malmö FF | 8 |

=== Attendances ===
| | Club | Home average | Away average | Home high |
|---|---|---|---|---|
| 1 | Malmö FF | 20,061 | 12,522 | 27,343 |
| 2 | IFK Göteborg | 14,618 | 13,681 | 38,983 |
| 3 | AIK | 13,881 | 11,264 | 27,612 |
| 4 | Hammarby IF | 12,877 | 11,797 | 24,165 |
| 5 | Djurgårdens IF | 12,322 | 11,651 | 32,590 |
| 6 | Helsingborgs IF | 10,169 | 8,550 | 16,069 |
| 7 | Halmstads BK | 9,113 | 9,063 | 16,867 |
| 8 | Örgryte IS | 7,518 | 8,341 | 40,186 |
| 9 | Kalmar FF | 7,123 | 8,261 | 9,031 |
| 10 | Örebro SK | 7,012 | 8,070 | 10,485 |
| 11 | IF Elfsborg | 6,443 | 8,686 | 10,635 |
| 12 | GIF Sundsvall | 6,270 | 7,848 | 8,040 |
| 13 | Landskrona BoIS | 5,881 | 8,526 | 11,036 |
| 14 | Trelleborgs FF | 3,459 | 8,487 | 9,843 |
| — | Total | 9,768 | — | 40,186 |
