= Filip Beckman =

Swedish footballer (born 2003)

Personal information
- Full name: Filip Ludwig Beckman
- Date of birth: 10 February 2003 (age 23)
- Height: 1.98 m (6 ft 6 in)
- Position: Central defender

Team information
- Current team: GAIS
- Number: 24

Youth career
- Kungsbacka IF
- –2018: BK Häcken
- 2019: Tölö IF
- 2020–2022: GAIS

Senior career*
Years	Team	Apps	(Gls)
2023–	GAIS	60	(3)
- * Club domestic league appearances and goals as of 8 July 2026

Filip Beckman (born 10 February 2003) is a Swedish footballer who plays as a central defender for GAIS in Allsvenskan.

Beckman hails from Kungsbacka and started his youth career in Kungsbacka IF. He played team handball until he was 14, and his brother Melwin Beckman became a handballer. Filip Beckman spent time in the PR Academy before moving to Gothenburg club BK Häcken. He did not progress past the U16 team in Häcken, and via Tölö IF he moved to the academy of another Gothenburg club GAIS. He was an unused substitute for Tölö's senior team in Division 4.

Beckman was drafted into the senior squad ahead of the 2023 season. He made his senior debut in a Gothenburg derby against IFK Göteborg in February 2023, in the 2022–23 Svenska Cupen. Contributing to GAIS' campaign in the 2023 Superettan, Beckman scored his first Superettan goal in May 2023. It was a decisive goal away against Östers IF, 6 minutes into stoppage time.

As GAIS won promotion to the Allsvenskan, Beckman was one of GAIS' several strong options in central defence, together with Axel Norén, Anes Čardaklija and Robin Frej. Beckman did not start any game until July 2024, when concussions on two of his teammates led to his first start. Four weeks later, in August 2024 Beckman scored his first Allsvenskan goal. Beckman finished the 2024 Allsvenskan campaign as a team regular.
