= Joackim Fagerjord =

Swedish footballer (born 1998)

Personal information
- Full name: Kent Joackim Håkon Fagerjord
- Birth name: Kent Joackim Håkon Åberg
- Date of birth: 22 July 1998 (age 28)
- Height: 1.88 m (6 ft 2 in)
- Position: Midfielder

Team information
- Current team: GAIS
- Number: 7

Youth career
- Kungsbacka IF
- –2014: Onsala BK
- 2015–2017: BK Häcken

Senior career*
Years	Team	Apps	(Gls)
2014	Onsala BK	9	(0)
2017–2019	Onsala BK	53	(11)
2020–	GAIS	127	(5)
- * Club domestic league appearances and goals as of 8 July 2026

Joackim Fagerjord (born 22 July 1998) is a Swedish footballer who plays as a midfielder for GAIS in Allsvenskan.

== Career ==
He started his youth career in Kungsbacka IF and went on to Onsala BK, making his senior debut in 2014 before joining BK Häcken's academy. He won the Gothia Cup with both Onsala and Häcken. He was later rejected by BK Häcken, and returned to Onsala.

Playing for Onsala in Division 2, the fourth tier of Swedish football, Åberg trained with Degerfors IF in the winter of 2018–19 before signing for GAIS after the 2019 season. He knew their assistant manager Fredrik Holmberg. Later, another player joined who knew both Åberg and Holmberg, Gustav Lundgren.

In 2021 Åberg lost several months in the summer/fall to knee surgery. In 2022 he lost the spring and early summer parts of the season, and had to undergo double hip surgery. He came back as a key player in GAIS' promotion from the third tier. His contract was prolonged to the end of 2023.

He underwent surgery again ahead of the 2023 season. The pre-season turned out to be very promising for GAIS and for Åberg, and a contract extension was already being discussed. It was now prolonged until the end of 2026, reportedly as a club like Boluspor showed their interest.

GAIS won promotion to the 2024 Allsvenskan. In their pre-season assessment of the team, Fotbollskanalen wrote: "the main key is the team's hub, Joackim Åberg. The midfielder's linking play, elegant composure and safe passing foot get GAIS' play flowing. That fact becomes extra tangible when the 25-year-old cannot play. The squad lacks a pure alternative to Åberg with similar qualities - which means that his importance only increases". Åberg made his Allsvenskan debut in March 2024 against Brommapojkarna, and played his 100th league match for the club in October 2024. However, in November he was ruled out due to yet another hip surgery.

== Personal life ==
In July 2025 he changed his surname to his mother's name, Fagerjord.
