= Fredrik Björck =

Swedish footballer

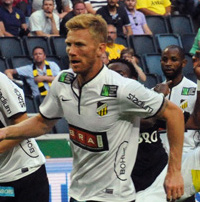

Personal information
- Full name: Bo Fredrik Björck
- Date of birth: 22 October 1979 (age 47)
- Place of birth: Kållered, Sweden
- Height: 1.90 m (6 ft 3 in)
- Position: Defender

Team information
- Current team: Västra Frölunda (Head coach)

Youth career
- 1985–1994: Kållered SK
- 1995–1997: IFK Göteborg

Senior career*
Years	Team	Apps	(Gls)
1997–2002	Västra Frölunda IF	65	(5)
2003–2005	AIK	44	(4)
2005	→ Helsingborgs IF (loan)	18	(0)
2006–2007	Helsingborgs IF	31	(0)
2007–2008	IF Elfsborg	9	(1)
2008–2010	Esbjerg fB	56	(3)
2010–2012	Tromsø	88	(5)
2013–2014	BK Häcken	28	(0)
2015–2017	Örgryte IS	56	(3)

Managerial career
- 2017: Örgryte IS (player-assistant)
- 2018–2019: Örgryte IS (assistant)
- 2020–: Västra Frölunda
- * Club domestic league appearances and goals

Bo Fredrik Björck (born 22 October 1979) is a Swedish former footballer who played as a defender and current head coach of Västra Frölunda IF.

== Career ==
=== Club career ===
He joined Helsingborgs IF before the start of the 2005 season, transferred from newly relegated AIK. A central defender, Björck has had injury problems during his time at HIF and the team has only been able to use him irregularly. When not injured, he has proven to be a stable player with a very powerful shot. Previously, he has also played for Västra Frölunda IF and as a youngster for Kållered SK and IFK Göteborg.

In the autumn of 2008 he was made captain of Esbjerg fB. On 4 February 2010 it was announced that he had signed a contract with Norwegian Tippeliga team Tromsø IL, after failing a medical test with Tippeligaen rivals, Aalesunds FK.

=== Coaching career ===
On 25 August 2017, Björck was appointed player-assistant to newly appointed manager Sören Börjesson. Retiring at the end of the 2017 season, he continued with his assistant coach duties for Örgryte IS. He left the position on 3 January 2019.

In December 2019 it was confirmed, that Björck had been appointed joint-head coach of Västra Frölunda IF alongside Adam Ekblad. Björck's former teammate, Dime Jankulovski, also joined the coaching staff as his assistant coach.

== Career statistics ==
Season	Club	Division	League		Cup		Total	
Season	Club	Division	Apps	Goals	Apps	Goals	Apps	Goals
2003	AIK	Allsvenskan	25	2	0	0	25	2
2004	AIK	Allsvenskan	19	2	0	0	19	2
2005	Helsingborg	Allsvenskan	18	0	0	0	18	0
2006	Helsingborg	Allsvenskan	19	0	0	0	19	0
2007	Helsingborg	Allsvenskan	12	0	0	0	12	0
2007	IF Elfsborg	Allsvenskan	9	1	0	0	9	1
2007–08	Esbjerg	Superliga	12	1	0	0	12	1
2008–09	Esbjerg	Superliga	27	0	0	0	27	0
2009–10	Esbjerg	Superliga	17	2	0	0	17	2
2010	Tromsø	Tippeligaen	28	1	0	0	28	1
2011	Tromsø	Tippeligaen	30	2	3	0	33	2
2012	Tromsø	Tippeligaen	30	2	6	1	36	3
2013	BK Häcken	Allsvenskan	22	0	0	0	22	0
Career Total			268	13	9	1	281	14
