= List of Sweden international footballers born outside Sweden =

This list includes the Swedish footballers who played at least one match for the Sweden senior national football team, and are born outside Sweden. Some of them are naturalized while others (like Tobias Linderoth and Jordan Larsson) are born outside the northern country while their father was playing in another country.

== List of players ==
=== Azerbaijan ===
- Jiloan Hamad 2011–18

=== Bosnia and Herzegovina ===
- Nordin Gerzić 2011
- Branimir Hrgota 2014

=== England ===
- Oliver Dovin 2023–

=== Eritrea ===
- Tesfaldet Tekie 2019–

=== Ethiopia ===
- Benjamin Kibebe 2001

=== Finland ===
- Gary Sundgren 1994–2000

=== France ===
- Tobias Linderoth 1999–2008

=== Iran ===
- Behrang Safari 2008–13

=== Italy ===
- Riccardo Gagliolo 2019

=== Kosovo ===
- Emir Bajrami 2010–12
- Erton Fejzullahu 2013–14

=== Kuwait ===
- Roony Bardghji 2025–

=== Lebanon ===
- George Mourad 2005
- Sharbel Touma 2001–04

=== Montenegro ===
- Emir Kujović 2016

=== Netherlands ===
- Jordan Larsson 2018–
- Niclas Kindvall 1992–94

=== Togo ===
- Pascal Simpson 1997

=== Turkey ===
- Erkan Zengin 2013–16

=== Uruguay ===
- Guillermo Molins 2010–14

=== (United States) USA ===
- Eddie Gustafsson 2000–10
- Frank Jacobsson 1951–53
- Karl-Alfred Jacobsson 1952–54

== By country of birth ==
Country	Total
Bosnia and Herzegovina	3
(United States) USA	3
Kosovo	2
Lebanon	2
Azerbaijan	1
England	1
Eritrea	1
Ethiopia	1
Finland	1
France	1
Iran	1
Italy	1
Kuwait	1
Montenegro	1
Netherlands	1
Togo	1
Turkey	1
Uruguay	1
