= Johannes Selvén =

Swedish footballer

Personal information
- Full name: Johannes Daniel Erik Selvén
- Date of birth: 26 July 2003 (age 23)
- Place of birth: Varberg, Sweden
- Height: 1.75 m (5 ft 9 in)
- Position: Right winger

Team information
- Current team: Vestri
- Number: 11

Youth career
- –2017: Galtabäcks
- 2019–2022: IFK Göteborg

Senior career*
Years	Team	Apps	(Gls)
2017–2019	Galtabäcks	22	(4)
2023	IFK Göteborg	0	(0)
2023	→ Örgryte IS (loan)	4	(0)
2023–2025	OB	9	(1)
2024	→ Vestri (loan)	10	(1)
2025	Utsiktens BK	12	(0)
2025–	Vestri	27	(3)

International career^{‡}
2023–	Sweden U-20	2	(0)
- * Club domestic league appearances and goals as of 13 September 2026 ‡ National team caps and goals as of 19:30, 12 May 2024 (UTC)

Johannes Daniel Erik Selvén (born 26 July 2003) is a Swedish footballer who plays as a right winger for Vestri.

== Club career ==
=== Galtabäcks and IFK Göteborg ===
Already at a very early age, as a 14-15 year old, Selvén played senior football for his childhood club, Galtabäcks, which played in the Swedish Division 5 and later also in Division 6.

In the summer of 2018, 15-year-old Selvén trained with IFK Göteborg. However, he only officially moved to Gothenburg a year later, in the summer of 2019. On January 9, 2023, Selvén signed his first professional contract, which also meant he was permanently promoted to the first team squad. He put his signature until the end of the year.

On February 20, 2023, Selvén made his official debut in a cup match against Utsiktens BK. He also played the subsequent cup match against GAIS six days later.

On March 28, 2023, Selvén joined Örgryte IS on a loan deal in search of more playing time. After four games for the club, Selvén returned to Gothenburg in mid-May 2023.

On June 10, 2023, Gothenburg confirmed that Selvén's contract had been terminated by mutual agreement.

=== OB ===
On June 14, 2023, Selvén signed with Danish Superliga club Odense Boldklub, where he signed a three-year deal and got jersey number 19. He made his debut in a 2–1 victory over Brøndby IF on July 30, 2023.

Selven played just 482 minutes across 10 matches in all competitions before being loaned out to Icelandic club Vestri at the end of April 2024 until the end of the year. He was back in OB in July, where he started pre-season with the rest of the team ahead of the 2024–25 season.

In his first half-season back at OB in 2024–25, Selvén only managed to play one cup match for the club, getting 13 minutes on the pitch while sitting as an unused substitute in 10 league matches.

=== Utsiktens BK ===
On March 3, 2025, Selvén returned to Sweden, signing with Utsiktens BK of the Superettan on a deal running until the end of 2027.

=== Vestri ===
On July 31, 2025, Icelandic club Vestri announced the signing of Selvén on a permanent transfer, moving back to the club he had spent the first part of 2024 on loan with. Selvén signed a 3-year contract with the Besta Deild club.

== International career ==
=== Philippines ===
In March 2024, Selven was reportedly one of the players being recruited by head coach Tom Saintfiet and team manager Freddy Gonzalez to play for the Philippines.
