= Frank Jacobsson =

Swedish association football player and manager (1930–2017)

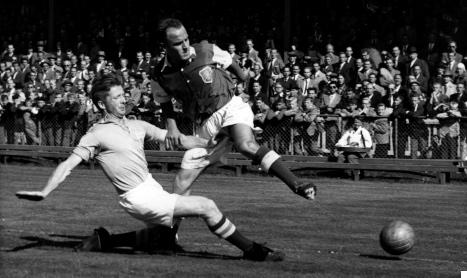
- Sune Sandbring in a game with Frank "Sanny" Jacobsson (right) from GAIS in the Allsvenskan 1953

Personal information
- Full name: Frank Charles "Sanny" Jacobsson
- Date of birth: 6 July 1930
- Place of birth: Boston, Massachusetts, United States
- Date of death: 26 February 2017 (aged 86)
- Place of death: Gothenburg, Sweden
- Position: Winger

Youth career
- 1945–1949: Redbergslids IK Fotboll

Senior career*
Years	Team	Apps	(Gls)
1949–1960	GAIS	130	(25)

International career^{‡}
1951–1953	Sweden	6	(1)

Managerial career
- 1960–1961: Vårgårda IK
- * Club domestic league appearances and goals as of 8 April 2018 ‡ National team caps and goals as of 8 April 2018

Frank Charles "Sanny" Jacobsson (6 July 1930 – 26 February 2017) was a professional footballer who spent his entire career as a winger for the club GAIS in the Swedish Allsvenskan. Born in the United States, he represented Sweden internationally.

== Professional career ==
Jacobsson spent his entire professional career with GAIS, from 1949 to 1960. Jacobsson played an important role in the 1953–54 Allsvenskan season, by scoring 4 goals in the last 3 games of the season. These matches were title deciders in a close race to end the season, and helped GAIS win their first Allsvenskan in 23 years.

From 1960 to 1961, Jacobsson managed Vårgårda IK.

== Personal life ==
Jacobsson was born in the United States to a Swedish father and Italian mother, and moved to Sweden at a young age. Jacobsson played professional football alongside his brother, Karl-Alfred Jacobsson, with GAIS and the Sweden men's national football team. His son, Roberto Jacobsson, was also associated with GAIS as a manager and player.

== Honours ==
=== Club ===
GAIS

- Allsvenskan (1): 1953–54
