= Robin Frej =

Swedish footballer (born 1998)

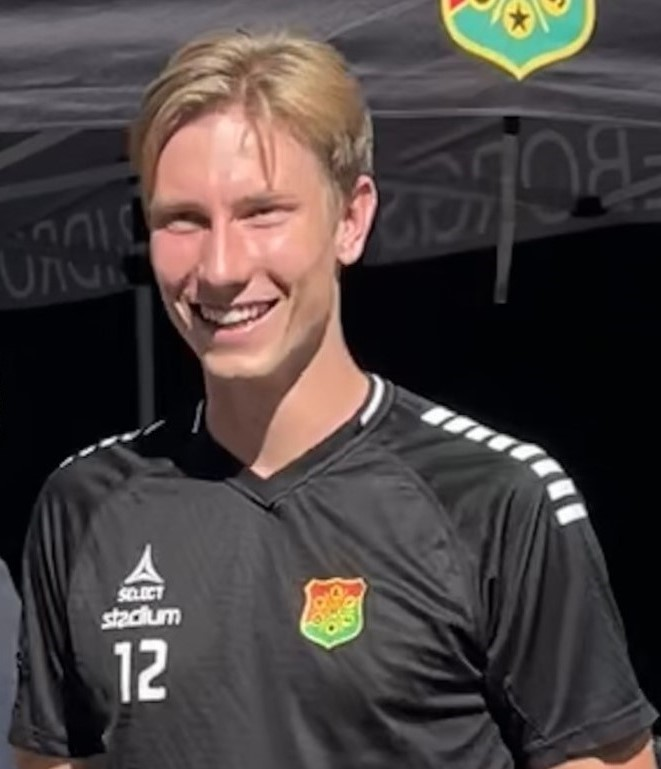
- Frej in 2024

Personal information
- Full name: Robin Sixten Frej
- Date of birth: 7 April 1998 (age 28)
- Height: 1.88 m (6 ft 2 in)
- Position: Central defender

Team information
- Current team: GAIS
- Number: 12

Youth career
- Kärrdals IF

Senior career*
Years	Team	Apps	(Gls)
2016	FC Djursholm	16	(0)
2017	Enskede IK	19	(0)
2018–2019	IFK Stocksund	49	(2)
2020	IF Sylvia	27	(3)
2021–2022	IF Brommapojkarna	52	(2)
2023–	GAIS	80	(4)
- * Club domestic league appearances and goals as of 8 July 2026

Robin Frej (born 7 April 1998) is a Swedish footballer who plays as a central defender for GAIS in Allsvenskan.

== Career ==
Frej started his youth career in Kärrdals IF in Sollentuna. He also started his senior career in the Stockholm area, in FC Djursholm, before moving on to Enskede IK and IFK Stocksund. At the latter club he was discovered by Division 1 club IF Sylvia, where he moved in 2020. His goal was to win the attention of Sylvia's cooperation club, IFK Norrköping, and make his way into the Allsvenskan with that team.

Instead, he moved back to Stockholm and IF Brommapojkarna in 2021. Remarkably, Frej won promotions with Brommapojkarna from the 2021 Ettan and the 2022 Superettan, continuing his career in GAIS with whom he won his third straight promotion, from the 2023 Superettan. Finally making his Allsvenskan debut in 2024, Frej was one of GAIS' several strong options in central defence, together with Axel Norén, Anes Čardaklija and Filip Beckman.

Frej's spell in the 2024 Allsvenskan was halted by a concussion in July, in a match against Sirius. As it turned out, the concussion continued to affect him during the autumn. He also sat on a contract due to expire after the season, but eventually had it prolonged.
