= 1967 Division 2 (Swedish football) =

Swedish League Division 2
- Season: 1967
- Champions: Sandvikens IF; IK Brage; Åtvidabergs FF; Östers IF
- Promoted: Åtvidabergs FF; Östers IF
- Relegated: Sandvikens AIK; Luleå SK; Hallstahammars SK; Södertälje SK; Avesta AIK; Finspångs AIK; Göteborgs AIK; Redbergslids IK; IFK Kristianstad; Gunnarstorps IF; Hässleholms IF; IFK Ystad

Statistics of Swedish football Division 2 for the 1967 season.

== League standings ==
=== Norrland ===
Pos	Team	Pld	W	D	L	GF	GA	GD	Pts	Qualification or relegation
1	Sandvikens IF	18	17	0	1	57	17	+40	34	Playoffs for promotion to Allsvenskan
2	GIF Sundsvall	18	11	1	6	56	42	+14	23	
3	Brynäs IF	18	10	1	7	28	23	+5	21	
4	IF Friska Viljor	18	9	1	8	32	32	0	19	
5	IFK Luleå	18	8	2	8	27	27	0	18	
6	Sandåkerns SK	18	8	2	8	30	33	−3	18	
7	Skellefteå AIK/IF	18	6	3	9	26	30	−4	15	
8	Domsjö IF	18	5	4	9	30	31	−1	14	
9	Sandvikens AIK	18	6	2	10	30	31	−1	14	Relegation to Division 3
10	Luleå SK	18	1	2	15	16	66	−50	4	Relegation to Division 3

=== Svealand ===
Pos	Team	Pld	W	D	L	GF	GA	GD	Pts	Qualification or relegation
1	IK Brage	22	15	5	2	53	18	+35	35	Playoffs for promotion to Allsvenskan
2	Degerfors IF	22	13	6	3	40	18	+22	32	
3	IFK Eskilstuna	22	14	3	5	61	30	+31	31	
4	IK Sirius	22	13	2	7	42	24	+18	28	
5	Sundbybergs IK	22	9	3	10	48	41	+7	21	
6	Västerås SK	22	8	5	9	45	51	−6	21	
7	IFK Arvika	22	7	7	8	36	45	−9	21	
8	IFK Stockholm	22	7	6	9	26	34	−8	20	
9	Karlstads BK	22	6	6	10	30	34	−4	18	
10	Hallstahammars SK	22	6	3	13	42	58	−16	15	Relegation to Division 3
11	Södertälje SK	22	6	1	15	34	64	−30	13	Relegation to Division 3
12	Avesta AIK	22	4	1	17	27	67	−40	9	Relegation to Division 3

=== Norra Götaland ===
Pos	Team	Pld	W	D	L	GF	GA	GD	Pts	Qualification or relegation
1	Åtvidabergs FF	22	15	6	1	51	10	+41	36	Playoffs for promotion to Allsvenskan
2	Västra Frölunda IF	22	12	5	5	43	24	+19	29	
3	Skövde AIK	22	13	2	7	46	33	+13	28	
4	Alingsås IF	22	11	5	6	40	28	+12	27	
5	Grimsås IF	22	8	6	8	26	31	−5	22	
6	IF Saab	22	9	3	10	32	26	+6	21	
7	BK Derby	22	6	8	8	27	31	−4	20	
8	Jönköping Södra IF	22	7	5	10	30	30	0	19	
9	Skogens IF	22	7	5	10	30	34	−4	19	
10	Finspångs AIK	22	7	4	11	31	49	−18	18	Relegation to Division 3
11	Göteborgs AIK	22	6	4	12	31	57	−26	16	Relegation to Division 3
12	Redbergslids IK	22	3	3	16	19	53	−34	9	Relegation to Division 3

=== Södra Götaland ===
Pos	Team	Pld	W	D	L	GF	GA	GD	Pts	Qualification or relegation
1	Östers IF	24	18	3	3	79	28	+51	39	Playoffs for promotion to Allsvenskan
2	IFÖ/Bromölla IF	24	14	4	6	43	27	+16	32	
3	IS Halmia	24	12	7	5	42	36	+6	31	
4	IFK Malmö	24	12	5	7	63	41	+22	29	
5	Kalmar FF	24	10	7	7	39	34	+5	27	
6	IFK Trelleborg	24	11	5	8	39	42	−3	27	
7	Landskrona BoIS	24	10	3	11	51	49	+2	23	
8	Sölvesborgs GIF	24	7	6	11	39	40	−1	20	
9	Gnosjö IF	24	8	4	12	28	48	−20	20	
10	IFK Kristianstad	24	9	1	14	31	39	−8	19	Relegation to Division 3
11	Gunnarstorps IF	24	6	4	14	30	48	−18	16	Relegation to Division 3
12	Hässleholms IF	24	6	4	14	23	54	−31	16	Relegation to Division 3
13	IFK Ystad	24	5	3	16	22	53	−31	13	Relegation to Division 3

== Allsvenskan promotion playoffs ==
Pos	Team	Pld	W	D	L	GF	GA	GD	Pts	Promotion
1	Åtvidabergs FF	2	2	0	0	4	0	+4	4	Promotion to Allsvenskan
2	Östers IF	2	2	0	0	3	0	+3	4	Promotion to Allsvenskan
3	IK Brage	2	0	0	2	0	3	−3	0	
4	Sandvikens IF	2	0	0	2	0	4	−4	0	
