= Bengt Andersson (footballer, born 1966) =

Swedish footballer and coach

Personal information
- Full name: Bengt Evert Andersson
- Date of birth: 11 August 1966 (age 60)
- Place of birth: Kungsbacka, Sweden
- Height: 1.91 m (6 ft 3 in)
- Position: Goalkeeper

Youth career
- 1975–1979: Hanhals BK
- 1979–1984: GAIS

Senior career*
Years	Team	Apps	(Gls)
1984–1985	GAIS	4	(0)
1986–1992	IK Brage	114	(3)
1993–1996	Örgryte IS	90	(3)
1996–1998	Tenerife	20	(0)
1998–2007	IFK Göteborg	246	(0)
2008	Tölö IF	11	(0)
2008	→ Fredrikstad FK (loan)	0	(0)
2008	→ Moss FK (loan)	13	(0)
2009–2011	Örgryte IS	24	(0)
2011–2013	Önnereds IK	36	(0)
2012	→ Kristbergs IF (loan)	1	(0)
2013	Örgryte IS	0	(0)
2014	Åsa IF	1	(0)
2015	Pålsboda GoIF	8	(0)
2015	→ Älvängens IK (loan)	4	(0)
2016	Särö IK	1	(0)
Total		573	(6)

International career
1983–1985	Sweden U18	15	(0)
1997	Sweden B	1	(0)
1995–1996	Sweden	11	(0)

Managerial career
- 2013–2014: Kållered SK
- * Club domestic league appearances and goals

Bengt Evert Andersson (born 11 August 1966) is a Swedish football coach and former professional player.

Having most prominently represented IFK Göteborg, Örgryte IS and IK Brage during a career spanning twenty-three years, Andersson initially retired from playing in 2007. However, he has since made several returns to the game, most recently joining Särö IK, at the age of 50, in 2016.

== Club career ==
Born in Kungsbacka, Andersson began his career in his native Sweden with GAIS, Brage and Örgryte, where he gained a reputation as a good penalty taker in spite of being a goalkeeper. After two seasons with Spanish club Tenerife, with whom he reached the UEFA Cup semi-finals in 1997, Andersson joined Göteborg, where he was the club's first choice goalkeeper until the 2008 season. There was some speculation that he would retire after the 2006 season, but Andersson himself stated in the official IFK magazine that he would continue for at least three more seasons. He made 194 straight appearances in the Swedish top flight, the seventh most of all time. He is also one of the oldest players to have ever played in the Allsvenskan.

He finally won the Swedish league title with Göteborg, becoming a Swedish champion for the first time at the age of 41. He was the oldest footballer to ever win the Allsvenskan.

In the summer of 2008 he joined Norwegian second-tier side Moss on loan from Tölö IF.

Andersson briefly retired after the 2008 season, but in May 2009 he made his comeback with his former club Örgryte, signing a three-month contract with a possible extension, after two of Örgryte's goalkeepers became injured.

On 9 November 2012, Andersson officially announced he would start a career as a coach and that he had been appointed head coach of Swedish Division 3 club Kållered SK.

On 8 August 2013, he made a brief comeback as third-choice goalkeeper for Örgryte IS.

On 18 June 2014, he was sacked as Kållered SK coach.

== International career ==
Andersson made his debut for Sweden on 4 June 1995 in a 0–1 loss against Brazil at the Villa Park in Birmingham during the Umbro Cup. He was a stand-by player in the 2006 FIFA World Cup.

== Honours ==
Individual

- Årets Ärkeängel: 2001
