= John Nilsson =

Swedish footballer

John "Long-John" Nilsson
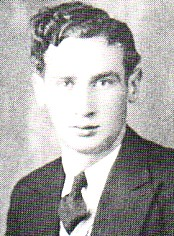
- Nilsson as a young man

Personal information
- Full name: John Oskar Emanuel Nilsson
- Date of birth: 27 April 1908
- Place of birth: Gothenburg, Sweden
- Date of death: 1 December 1987 (aged 79)
- Place of death: Göteborg, Sweden
- Position: Forward

Youth career
- IK Virgo

Senior career*
Years	Team	Apps	(Gls)
–1933	GAIS		
1934	IFK Östersund		
1934–1936	AIK	31	(18)
1936–1937	GAIS		
1937–?	Sibbhults IF		

International career
1932	Sweden	2	(6)
- * Club domestic league appearances and goals

John Oskar Emanuel "Long-John" Nilsson (27 April 1908 – 1 December 1987) was a Swedish footballer who played as a forward. He was the 1930–31 Allsvenskan top scorer while at GAIS and won two caps for the Sweden national team, scoring six goals.

== Club career ==
Beginning his career at IK Virgo, he had his breakthrough year in 1930 with GAIS when he became the 1930–31 Allsvenskan top scorer and helped the club win the 1930–31 Swedish Championship. He briefly played for IFK Östersund in 1934 before signing with AIK, where he spent two Allsvenskan seasons. He finished up his career at his hometown GAIS as well as at Sibbhults IF. He scored a total of 68 goals in 78 games for GAIS during his two spells with the club.

== International career ==
Nilsson made his debut for the Sweden national team on 17 July 1932, scoring two goals in a 3–4 loss to Austria at the Stockholm Olympic Stadium. He scored four goals in his second and ultimately last international appearance in a friendly game against Lithuania.

== Career statistics ==
=== International ===
Appearances and goals by national team and year
National team	Year	Apps	Goals
Sweden	1932	2	6
Total		2	6

Scores and results list Sweden's goal tally first, score column indicates score after each Nilsson goal.

List of international goals scored by John Nilsson
No.	Date	Venue	Opponent	Score	Result	Competition	Ref.
1	17 July 1932	Stockholm Olympic Stadium, Stockholm, Sweden	Austria	2–3	3–4	Friendly	
2	17 July 1932	Stockholm Olympic Stadium, Stockholm, Sweden	Austria	3–4	3–4	Friendly	
3	25 September 1932	Stockholm Olympic Stadium, Stockholm, Sweden	Lithuania	4–1	8–1	Friendly	
4	25 September 1932	Stockholm Olympic Stadium, Stockholm, Sweden	Lithuania	5–1	8–1	Friendly	
5	25 September 1932	Stockholm Olympic Stadium, Stockholm, Sweden	Lithuania	6–1	8–1	Friendly	
6	25 September 1932	Stockholm Olympic Stadium, Stockholm, Sweden	Lithuania	7–1	8–1	Friendly	

== Honours ==
GAIS

- Allsvenskan: 1930–31

Individual

- Allsvenskan top scorer: 1930–31
