= Söner Watches =

Swedish watchmaking company

- Type: Private
- Industry: Watchmaking
- Founded: 2016
- Founder: Freddie Palmgren
- Headquarters: Kungsbacka, Sweden
- Area served: Worldwide
- Products: Rectangular analog watches
- Website: sonerwatches.com

Söner Watches is a Swedish watchmaking company founded in 2016 by entrepreneur and author Freddie Palmgren. According to Palmgren, the company is the only watch brand in the world that produces solely rectangular watches.

== History ==
Söner Watches was established in 2016 in Kungsbacka, Sweden, by Freddie Palmgren, who sought to challenge the dominance of round wristwatches in contemporary horology. The company’s inaugural line, the Legacy Collection, debuted in 2016.

== Products ==
Söner produces rectangular watches with both automatic and quartz movements, drawing inspiration from Art Deco geometric design.

The brand’s main collections include:

- Legacy: quartz models with stainless steel cases.
- Momentum: automatic watches with Japanese Miyota 9039 movements and 100 m water resistance.
- Amorous: dress watches featuring Swiss Sellita automatic movements.
- Nostalgia: ultra-thin quartz watches with Swiss ETA movements and 11-year battery life.

== Reception ==
Söner Watches has been covered in international media including The New York Times and Dagens Industri. Independent reviews have appeared in WatchReviewBlog, WristWatchReview, Kaminsky Blog, and Klockfeber.

== Founder ==
Freddie Palmgren is a Swedish entrepreneur and author. He has written two books on horology: Beyond Round Watches (2024), a study of rectangular timepieces, and How to Spot a Fake Watch (2026).
