= Samir Bakaou =

Tunisian footballer (born 1954)

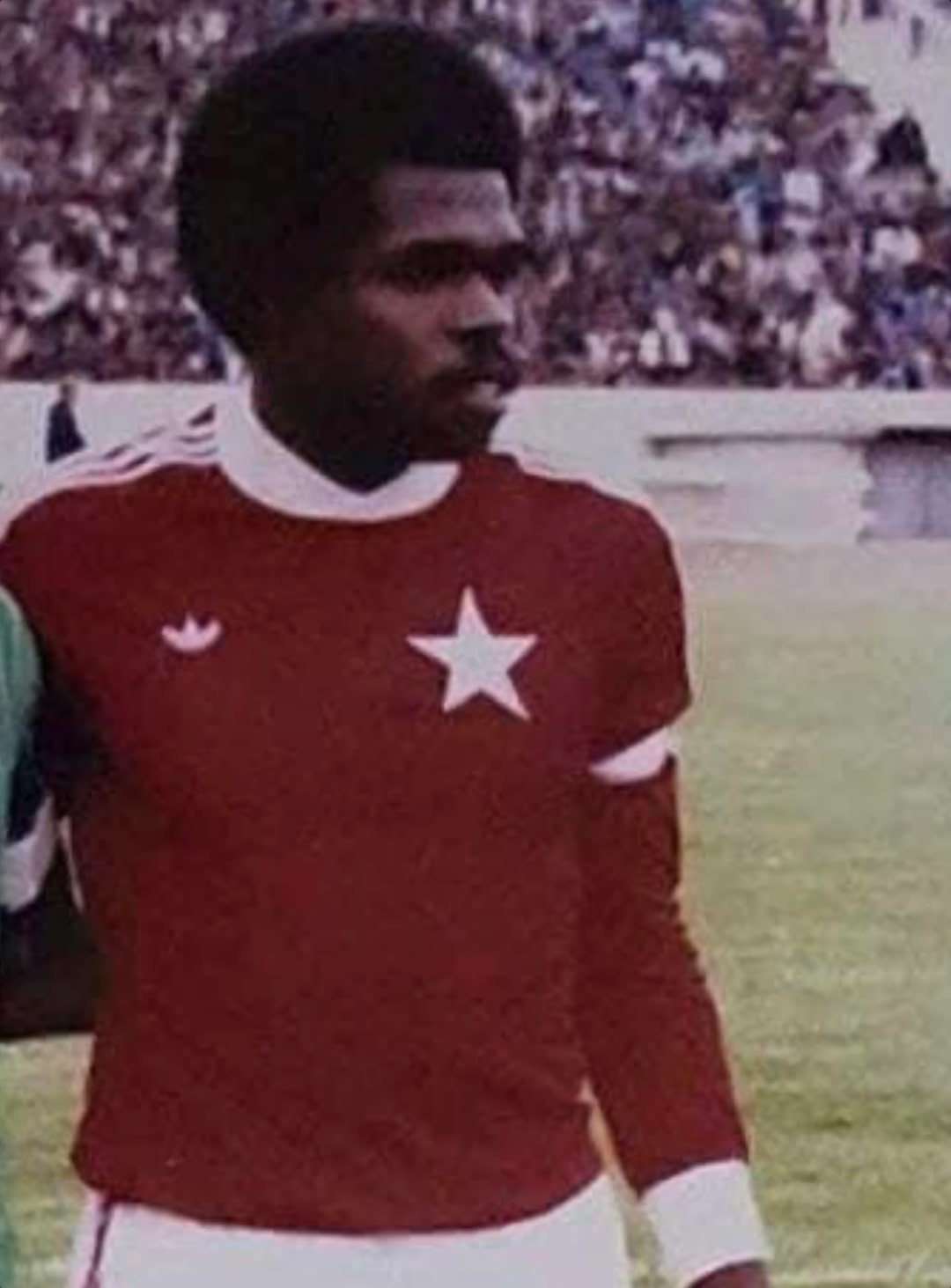
- Samir in 1984

Personal information
- Date of birth: 17 October 1954 (age 72)
- Place of birth: Sousse, Tunisia
- Position: Midfielder

Senior career*
Years	Team	Apps	(Gls)
1970–1981	Étoile du Sahel	?	(?)
1982–1984	Al Wahda	?	(?)
1984–1986	GAIS	51	(24)
1987	Västra Frölunda IF	13	(0)
1988–1990	GAIS	60	(14)

International career
1973–1989	Tunisia	45	(3)
- * Club domestic league appearances and goals

Samir Bakaou (Arabic: سمير بكاو; born 17 October 1954) is a Tunisian former footballer who played as a midfielder. Mainly known for his stints with Swedish club GAIS, Bakaou was the top goalscorer of the 1985 Division 2 Södra with 20 goals. He also represented the Tunisia national team. Beside GAIS, Bakaou played at club level for Tunisian club Étoile du Sahel, Emirati club Al Wahda, and Swedish club Västra Frölunda IF.

== Biography ==
=== Early career ===
Bakaou began his career at Étoile du Sahel (ESS) from his hometown Sousse, playing there during the 1970s and early 1980s. Early on, he was considered one of Tunisia's most promising players: in 1970, when the Brazil national team visited Tunisia, Pelé remarked that Bakaou had a bright future. He made his debut for the Tunisia national team in 1973 and gained 45 caps, with his last appearance being a friendly against Egypt national team on 15 March 1989. Named Tunisia's best player in 1978 and 1981, he missed the 1978 FIFA World Cup in Argentina due to a groin injury. He also went on to captain the national team.

=== Swedish years ===
In the early 1980s, Bakaou was recruited by Al Wahda, a club from the United Arab Emirates, but in 1984 all foreign players were banned in the country. Swedish club GAIS's head coach Bo Falk learned about Bakaou through Ruben Alexandersson, a friend from Falk's time at Kalmar FF, who had been vacationing annually in Tunisia since 1977 and had kept an eye on Bakaou. GAIS, then in Division 2 Södra, seized the opportunity, and in the spring of 1984, Bakaou signed with the club. He debuted against Landskrona BoIS in a 1–1 match and scored four goals in his first year.

In 1985, Bakaou played in midfield alongside the defensive Lenna Kreivi and formed a strong partnership with forwards Ulf Köhl and Steve Gardner, known as "the golden triangle." He won the top goalscoring title in the Södra division with 20 goals and was named the league's best player and GAIS's best player, receiving Årets Makrill award. GAIS qualified for promotion play-offs to Allsvenskan but lost to Djurgården on penalties after two draws.

In May 1986, Bakaou tore his anterior cruciate ligament and was out for six months. He played only six matches for GAIS in 1986 and did not receive a new contract, as the club deemed it too risky to re-sign the 32-year-old, injury-prone player. In 1987, Västra Frölunda IF, newly promoted to the Allsvenskan, signed Bakaou, but he was unhappy at the club and longed to return to GAIS. Despite this, he has since stated that he had displayed a newfound toughness in challenges.

In 1988, GAIS was promoted back to the Allsvenskan, and Bakaou made a comeback with the team. During the season, he faced deportation from Sweden due to football players only being able to get residence permits for four years. GAIS appealed the decisions, and since Bakaou had returned to Tunisia during the winter months, they managed to circumvent the regulations. To stay in the country, Bakaou also worked at the restaurant Le Sportif in Gothenburg, run by his friend and personal trainer Ridha Chebil. GAIS finished eighth and remained in the Allsvenskan, with Bakaou scoring ten goals to become the team's top goalscorer.

In 1989, GAIS competed for top-three in Allsvenskan. They lost the semi-final to Malmö FF but secured a spot in the 1990–91 UEFA Cup. Bakaou had planned to retire after the season but was persuaded to stay another year. However, in the summer of 1990, he injured his knee during practice. In the fall of 1990, when GAIS played Torpedo Moscow away in the first round of the UEFA Cup, Bakaou was forced to leave the match with the score at 4–0 to Torpedo. He announced his retirement from football shortly after, and he returned to his hometown Sousse, where he declined a position at his old club Étoile du Sahel.

== Coaching career ==
In 1991, Bakaou was appointed youth coach at his old club Al Wahda in the United Arab Emirates. He stayed there for seven years, leading the club's youth teams to several successes. After that, he was a youth coach and assistant first-team coach at Al Jazira in Abu Dhabi. Later on, he became a scout for Swedish sports agent Mats Thyrén.

== Record at FIFA Tournaments ==
Year	Competition	Apps	Goal
1982	FIFA World Cup qualification	2	0
Total		2	0
