= Lilla Träslövs FF =

Swedish football club

- Full name: Lilla Träslövs Fotbollförening
- Founded: 1931
- Ground: Östervi; Varberg; Sweden
- Chairman: Bo Larsson
- League: Division 4 Halland
| Home colours | Away colours |

Lilla Träslövs FF is a Swedish football club located in Varberg.

== Background ==
Lilla Träslövs FF currently plays in Division 4 Halland which is the sixth tier of Swedish football. They play their home matches at the Östervi in Varberg.

The club is affiliated to Hallands Fotbollförbund. Lilla Träslövs FF played in the 2010 Svenska Cupen but lost 1–5 at home to Ramlösa Södra FF in the preliminary round.

== Season to season ==
In their most successful period Lilla Träslövs FF competed in the following divisions:

| Season | Level | Division | Section | Position | Movements |
|---|---|---|---|---|---|
| 1960 | Tier 4 | Division 4 | Halland | 5th | |
| 1961 | Tier 4 | Division 4 | Halland | 9th | |
| 1962 | Tier 4 | Division 4 | Halland | 6th | |
| 1963 | Tier 4 | Division 4 | Halland | 9th | Relegated |

In recent seasons Lilla Träslövs FF have competed in the following divisions:

| Season | Level | Division | Section | Position | Movements |
|---|---|---|---|---|---|
| 2006* | Tier 7 | Division 5 | Halland Norra | 1st | Promoted |
| 2007 | Tier 6 | Division 4 | Halland | 4th | |
| 2008 | Tier 6a | Division 4 | Halland Elit | 9th | |
| 2009 | Tier 6a | Division 4 | Halland Elit | 11th | Relegated |
| 2010 | Tier 6b | Division 4 | Halland | 9th | |
| 2011 | Tier 6b | Division 4 | Halland | 5th | |

* League restructuring in 2006 resulted in a new division being created at Tier 3 and subsequent divisions dropping a level.
