= Tomas Erixon =

Swedish football manager

Mr Tomas Erixon
- Born: April 16, 1955 (age 70)

Tomas Erixon (born 16 April 1955) is a Swedish professional football manager who currently manages GAIS.
