= GoIF Ginsten =

Swedish football club

- Full name: Gymnastik-och Idrottsföreningen Ginsten
- Founded: 1935
- Ground: Ginstavallen; Falkenberg; Sweden
- League: Division 4 Halland Elit
Home colours	Away colours

GoIF Ginsten is a Swedish football club located in Falkenberg.

== Background ==
GoIF Ginsten currently plays in Division 4 Halland Elit which is the sixth tier of Swedish football. They play their home matches at the Ginstavallen in Falkenberg.

The club is affiliated to Hallands Fotbollförbund.

== Season to season ==
Season	Level	Division	Section	Position	Movements
2006*	Tier 7	Division 5	Halland Norra	2nd	Promotion Playoffs – Promoted
2007	Tier 6	Division 4	Halland	10th	Relegated
2008	Tier 6	Division 4	Halland	7th	
2009	Tier 6	Division 4	Halland	2nd	Promoted
2010	Tier 6	Division 4	Halland Elit	8th	
2011	Tier 6	Division 4	Halland Elit		

* League restructuring in 2006 resulted in a new division being created at Tier 3 and subsequent divisions dropping a level.
