= Bengt-Arne Strömberg =

Swedish footballer (1954–2024)

Personal information
- Date of birth: 13 February 1954
- Date of death: 27 November 2024 (aged 70)

Senior career*
Years	Team	Apps	(Gls)
- GAIS
- IF Warta
- IF Viken

Managerial career
- 1983–: Mölnlycke IF
- Fräntorps IF
- Godhems IF
- Jonsereds IF
- 1993–1996: GAIS
- 1999–2001: IF Elfsborg
- 2002: IFK Norrköping
- Floda BoIF
- * Club domestic league appearances and goals

Bengt-Arne Strömberg (13 February 1954 – 27 November 2024) was a Swedish football player and coach.

Strömberg played for GAIS, IF Warta, and IF Viken. In 1983, Strömberg took over Mölnlycke IF, and then coached Fräntorps IF, Godhems IF, Jonsereds IF, GAIS, IF Elfsborg, IFK Norrköping and Floda BoIF. He coached IF Elfsborg to win the 2000–01 Svenska Cupen.

After 25 years as football coach, Strömberg changed profession and became a lorry driver. Born on 13 February 1954, Strömberg died on 27 November 2024, at the age of 70.
