= Fredrik Lundgren =

Swedish footballer (born 1979)

Personal information
- Full name: Fredrik Lundgren
- Date of birth: 26 October 1979 (age 47)
- Place of birth: Sweden
- Height: 1.87 m (6 ft 2 in)
- Positions: Defender; midfielder

Youth career
- Torslanda IK

Senior career*
Years	Team	Apps	(Gls)
1996–1998	Torslanda IK	44	(10)
1999–2002	GAIS	53	(3)
2003	Sant Ignazius		
2003–2012	GAIS	210	(20)
- * Club domestic league appearances and goals

Fredrik Lundgren (born 26 October 1979) is a Swedish retired footballer who played as a defender and midfielder. His last club was GAIS.
