= Kållered =

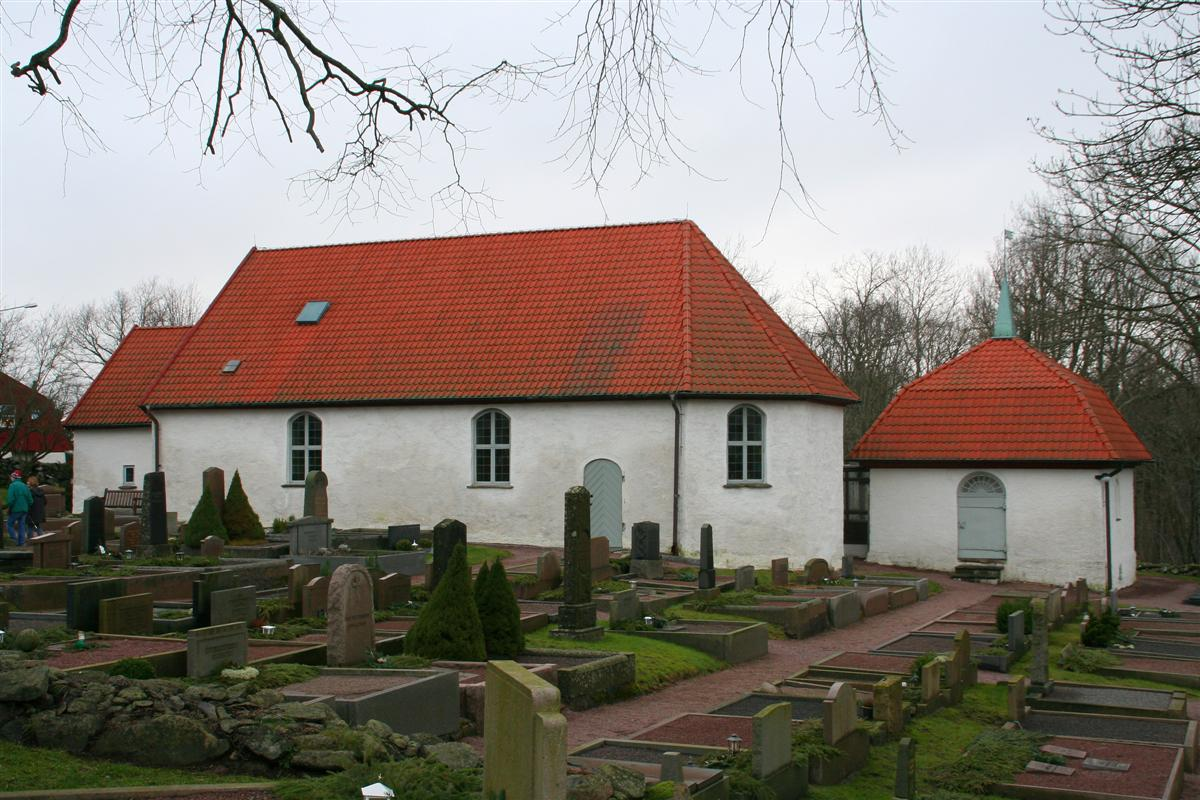
- Kållered Church

- Location within Västra Götaland Location within Sweden
- Coordinates: 57°36′N 12°03′E
- Country: Sweden
- Province: Västergötland
- County: Västra Götaland County
- Municipality: Mölndal Municipality

Area
  - Total: 4.80 km^{2} (1.85 sq mi)

Population (31 December 2010)
  - Total: 7,456
  - Density: 1,554/km^{2} (4,020/sq mi)
- Time zone: UTC+1 (CET)
  - Summer (DST): UTC+2 (CEST)

Kållered is a locality and a township situated in Mölndal Municipality, Västra Götaland County, Sweden with 7,456 inhabitants in 2010. Geographically, Kållered is mainly a dell, surrounded by ridges and mountainous terrain, with partially dense forestry particularly towards the south. The locality is a built up area, despite the number of inhabitants.

Kållered is home to a hive of small industries; some of the companies that can be found are soil- and quarrying industries, construction companies, and infotech companies.

== Infrastructure ==
Kållered is located 10 km south of Gothenburg. Kållered is also accessible by road or by public transport via the E6/E20 motorway and the western mainline railway link Västkustbanan. The commuter train stops in Kållered on its route between Gothenburg and Kungsbacka. This is run by Västtrafik. Apart from the commuter trains, Västtrafik offers several bus routes to and from Gothenburg and points south Lindome.

== Commerce ==
Kållered was home to two shopping malls, the most recent of which is named K-galleria, with several stores and some eateries. After K-galleria was torn down, all stores are located outside the mall itself, such as Stora Coop, Jula, Willys and an IKEA superstore. The shopping area is going through major rebuilding.

Inhabitants in Kållered enjoy excellent access to services, including a number of restaurants, a library, cafés, a food store, and a district health care center. A florist, hairdressers, and youth club are also to be found in Kållered Centre.

== Education ==
There are four schools in Kållered: Brattåsskolan, Östergård, Hallenskolan and Streteredsskolan.

== Recreation ==
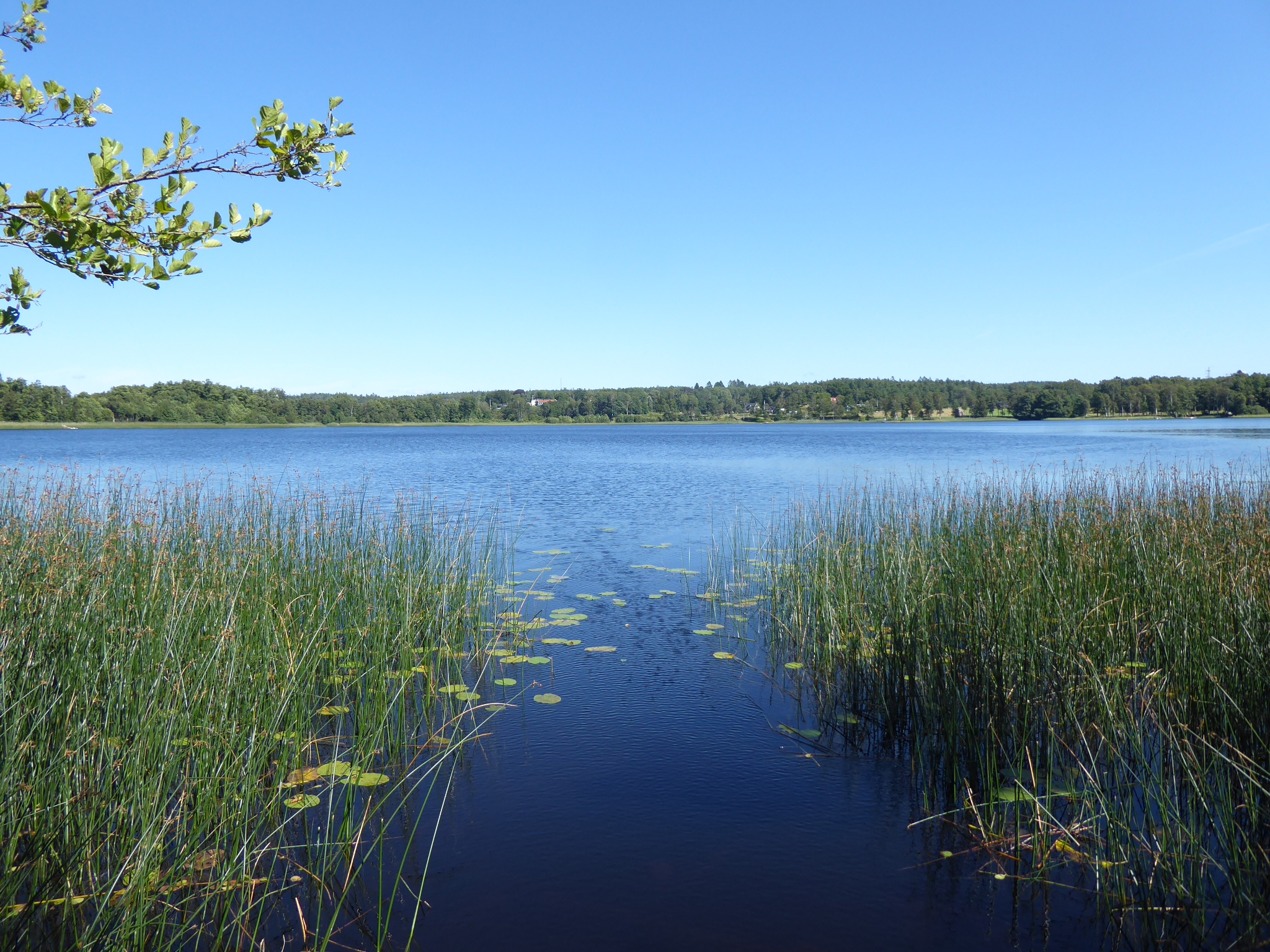
Lake Tulebo, August 2022

There are many different woodland paths and lakes in Kållered, as well as recently upgraded dedicated pedestrian and cycle paths.

The lakes in which people bathe are Färåstjärns and Tulebo Lake. Angling is allowed by law in five different lakes in Kållered; Tulebosjön, Färåstjärn, Hårssjön, Nordtjärn, and Våmmedalsstjärn.

Six different playgrounds can also be found in Kållered: Frälseängen, Märgelvägen, Nordgårdsvägen, Pilvägen, Skaftevägen, and Våmmedal.

Kållered has its own sports club; KSK: Kållered's Sports Club (Kållered Sportklubb). The club has three sections: football, ice hockey, and bandy.
