= Trönninge BK =

Swedish football club

- Full name: Trönninge Bollklubb
- Founded: 1967
- Ground: Håstens IP; Varberg; Sweden
- Chairman: Daniel Jäverbo
- Head coach: Michael Samuelsson; Fisnik Kameraj
- League: Division 4 Halland Elit
Home colours

Trönninge BK is a Swedish football club located in Varberg.

== Background ==
Trönninge BK currently plays in Division 4 Halland Elit which is the sixth tier of Swedish football. They play their home matches at the Håstens IP in Varberg.

The club is affiliated to Hallands Fotbollförbund.

== Season to season ==
Season	Level	Division	Section	Position	Movements
2006*	Tier 8	Division 6	Halland Norra	2nd	Promoted
2007	Tier 7	Division 5	Halland Norra	1st	Promoted
2008	Tier 6	Division 4	Halland Elit	1st	Promoted
2009	Tier 5	Division 3	Sydvästra Götaland	7th	
2010	Tier 5	Division 3	Sydvästra Götaland	9th	Relegation Playoffs – Relegated
2011	Tier 6	Division 4	Halland Elit	8th	

* League restructuring in 2006 resulted in a new division being created at Tier 3 and subsequent divisions dropping a level.
