= Gustav Lundgren (footballer) =

Swedish footballer (born 1995)

Personal information
- Full name: Gustav Hans Lundgren
- Date of birth: 18 April 1995 (age 31)
- Place of birth: Sweden
- Height: 1.90 m (6 ft 3 in)
- Position: Winger

Team information
- Current team: GAIS
- Number: 9

Youth career
- –2012: Tölö IF

Senior career*
Years	Team	Apps	(Gls)
2012–2015	Tölö IF	65	(26)
2016–2021	Onsala BK	119	(70)
2022–	GAIS	117	(14)

International career^{‡}
2025–	Sweden	2	(1)
- * Club domestic league appearances and goals as of 11 November 2025 ‡ National team caps and goals as of 17:14, 1 April 2026 (UTC)

Gustav Hans Lundgren (born 18 April 1995) is a Swedish professional footballer who plays as a winger for Allsvenskan club GAIS and the Sweden national team.

== Club career ==
Ahead of the 2022 season, Lundgren moved to GAIS, reuniting with manager Fredrik Holmberg who had previously coached him at Onsala BK. Ahead of the 2025 season, he extended his contract until 2029.

== International career ==
In November 2025, Lundgren received his first call-up to the Sweden national team. He scored in his debut against Slovenia in a 2026 FIFA World Cup qualification game that ended 1–1 on 18 November 2025.

== Career statistics ==
As of match played 31 March 2026

Appearances and goals by national team and year
National team	Year	Apps	Goals
Sweden	2025	1	1
Sweden	2026	1	0
Total		2	1

Scores and results list Sweden's goal tally first, score column indicates score after each Lundgren goal.

List of international goals scored by Gustav Lundgren
No.	Date	Venue	Opponent	Score	Result	Competition	Ref.
1	18 November 2025	Strawberry Arena, Solna, Sweden	Slovenia	1–1	1–1	2026 FIFA World Cup qualification	
