= Mergim Krasniqi =

Swedish footballer

Personal information
- Date of birth: 23 August 1992 (age 34)
- Place of birth: Borås, Sweden
- Height: 1.87 m (6 ft 2 in)
- Position: Goalkeeper

Team information
- Current team: GAIS
- Number: 1

Youth career
- –2008: Norrby

Senior career*
| Years | Team | Apps | (Gls) |
| 2009–2020 | Norrby | 238 | (0) |
| 2010 | → Bollebygd (loan) | 8 | (0) |
| 2021 | Örebro | 7 | (0) |
| 2022– | GAIS | 110 | (0) |
- * Club domestic league appearances and goals as of 8 July 2026

Mergim Krasniqi (Albanian: Mërgim Krasniqi; born 23 August 1992) is a Swedish footballer who plays as a goalkeeper for GAIS.

== Club career ==
=== Örebro ===
On 30 December 2020, Krasniqi signed a one-year contract with Allsvenskan club Örebro and this return would become legally effective two days later. On 20 February 2021, he was named as a Örebro substitute for the first time in a 2020–21 Svenska Cupen group stage match against Trelleborg. His debut with Örebro came on 18 July in a 0–2 home defeat against Hammarby after being named in the starting line-up.

=== GAIS ===
On 4 February 2022, Krasniqi joined GAIS on a one-season deal. On 11 November 2022, GAIS announced that Krasniqi had agree to extend his contract for 2 additional years.

== Career statistics ==
=== Club ===
As of match played 28 September 2025

Appearances and goals by club, season and competition
| Club | Season | League | | | Cup | | Other | | Total | |
| Club | Season | Division | Apps | Goals | Apps | Goals | Apps | Goals | Apps | Goals |
|---|---|---|---|---|---|---|---|---|---|---|
| Norrby | 2009 | Division 2 | 0 | 0 | 0 | 0 | — | | 0 | 0 |
| Norrby | 2011 | Division 1 | 25 | 0 | 0 | 0 | — | | 25 | 0 |
| Norrby | 2012 | Division 1 | 26 | 0 | 0 | 0 | — | | 26 | 0 |
| Norrby | 2013 | Division 2 | 22 | 0 | 1 | 0 | — | | 23 | 0 |
| Norrby | 2014 | Division 1 | 26 | 0 | 1 | 0 | — | | 27 | 0 |
| Norrby | 2015 | Division 1 | 21 | 0 | 4 | 0 | — | | 25 | 0 |
| Norrby | 2016 | Division 1 | 25 | 0 | 0 | 0 | 2 | 0 | 27 | 0 |
| Norrby | 2017 | Superettan | 28 | 0 | 1 | 0 | — | | 29 | 0 |
| Norrby | 2018 | Superettan | 29 | 0 | 4 | 0 | — | | 33 | 0 |
| Norrby | 2019 | Superettan | 30 | 0 | 4 | 0 | — | | 34 | 0 |
| Norrby | 2020 | Superettan | 29 | 0 | 1 | 0 | — | | 30 | 0 |
| Norrby | Total | | 261 | 0 | 16 | 0 | 2 | 0 | 279 | 0 |
| Bollebygd (loan) | 2010 | Division 3 | 8 | 0 | 0 | 0 | — | | 8 | 0 |
| Örebro | 2021 | Allsvenskan | 7 | 0 | 1 | 0 | — | | 8 | 0 |
| GAIS | 2022 | Ettan | 29 | 0 | 2 | 0 | — | | 31 | 0 |
| GAIS | 2023 | Superettan | 30 | 0 | 2 | 0 | — | | 32 | 0 |
| GAIS | 2024 | Allsvenskan | 21 | 0 | 2 | 0 | — | | 23 | 0 |
| GAIS | 2025 | Allsvenskan | 23 | 0 | 0 | 0 | — | | 23 | 0 |
| GAIS | Total | | 103 | 0 | 6 | 0 | — | | 109 | 0 |
| Career total | | | 371 | 0 | 23 | 0 | 2 | 0 | 396 | 0 |
