= Kenneth Gustafsson (footballer, born 1983) =

Swedish footballer (born 1983)

Personal information
- Full name: Kenneth Olof Gustafsson
- Date of birth: 15 September 1983 (age 43)
- Place of birth: Härryda Municipality, Sweden
- Height: 1.84 m (6 ft 0 in)
- Position: Defender

Youth career
- IFK Hindås

Senior career*
Years	Team	Apps	(Gls)
1999–2001	IFK Hindås		
2002–2015	GAIS	255	(4)
- * Club domestic league appearances and goals

Kenneth Gustafsson (born 15 September 1983) is a Swedish former footballer who played as a defender. After playing for IFK Hindås in his youth, Gustafsson came to GAIS in Gothenburg in 2002 and would remain in the club until his retirement after the season of 2015. The first season resulted in 8 appearances for GAIS, and the next season resulted in 12 appearances in the league and appearances in both of the qualifying games for Superettan.

During a game against AIK in May 2006, Gustafsson suffered a bone marrow infection and had to be hospitalized for two and a half weeks. The rest of the season 2006 were spent with rehabilitation, but the next season Gustafsson returned and made 29 appearances.

During his football career, Gustafsson studied at Chalmers where he got a bachelor's degree in "Industriell ekonomi" and returned to Chalmers after his retirement to earn a master's degree in supply chains management. After his retirement Gustafsson also started working for GAIS as a trainer for the club's youth players.
