= Karl-Alfred Jacobsson =

Swedish footballer (1926–2015)

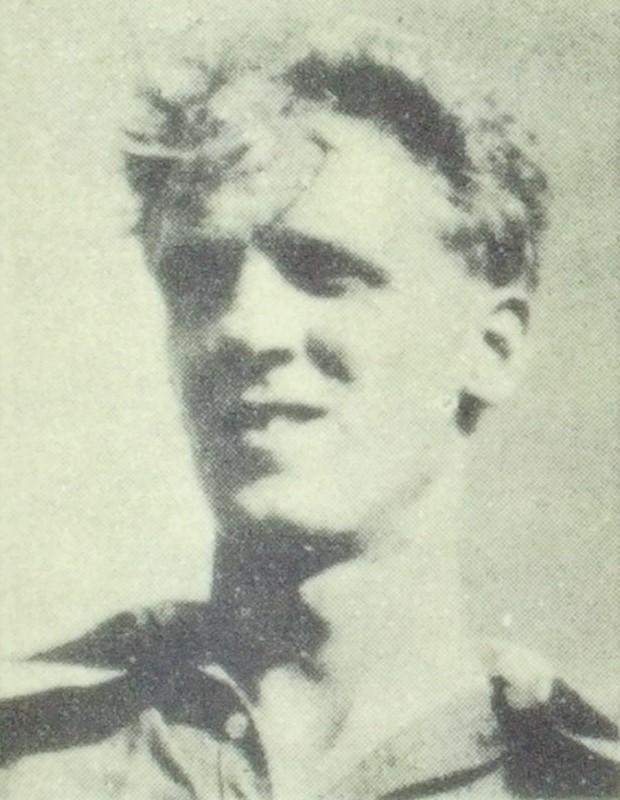

Personal information
- Full name: Karl-Alfred Jacobsson
- Date of birth: 15 January 1926
- Place of birth: Boston, Massachusetts, United States
- Date of death: 4 March 2015 (aged 89)
- Place of death: Gothenburg, Sweden
- Height: 1.86 m (6 ft 1 in)
- Position: Forward

Senior career*
Years	Team	Apps	(Gls)
1943	Gårda BK		
1944–1945	GAIS	13	(1)
- Redbergslids IK
1949–1959	GAIS	184	(144)

International career^{‡}
1952–1954	Sweden	6	(3)
- * Club domestic league appearances and goals as of 31 March 2013 ‡ National team caps and goals as of 31 March 2013

Karl-Alfred Jacobsson (15 January 1926 – 4 March 2015) was a footballer who is best known for the time he spent at GAIS in Allsvenskan. Born in the United States, he played for the Sweden national team.

== Career ==
At age 16 Jacobsson signed for second-tier team Gårda BK who offered to buy him a trench coat to lure the young player to the club. After his season at Gårda he made an early Allsvenskan debut with GAIS the following year but then chose to play for Redbergslids IK while doing his military service.

In 1949 he returned to GAIS where he was the club's top goalscorer in eight of the ten seasons he spent there. When GAIS celebrated its 100-year anniversary in 1994 he was voted "Player of the Century" and at the end of 1999 he was also voted "Player of the Millennium" by the GAIS supporters. He died in 2015 at a nursing home in Gothenburg.

== International career ==
Jacobsson scored three goals in six games for the Sweden men's national football team. He was also selected in the preliminary squads for the 1950 and 1958 FIFA World Cup but was cut from the final squads both times. During that time period players were selected to the national team by a committee instead of the manager and people in Gothenburg felt that the Stockholm-based committee were biased in only selecting players from the area around the Swedish capital.

== Personal life ==
Jacobsson was born in the United States to a Swedish father and Italian mother. He spent five years in the country before his family relocated to Sweden. Jacobsson played professional football alongside his brother, Frank Jacobsson, with GAIS and the Sweden men's national football team. His nephew, Roberto Jacobsson, was also associated with GAIS as a manager and player.

== Honours ==
=== Club ===
- Allsvenskan (1): 1953–54 Allsvenskan

=== Individual ===
- Allsvenskan top goalscorer (3): 1951–52, 1952–53, 1953–54
