= 1930–31 Allsvenskan =

7th season of Allsvenskan

Allsvenskan
- Season: 1930–31
- Champions: GAIS
- Relegated: Redbergslids IK; Sandvikens IF
- Top goalscorer: John "Long-John" Nilsson, GAIS (26)
- Average attendance: 7,039

Allsvenskan 1930–31, part of the 1930–31 Swedish football season, was the seventh Allsvenskan season played. The first match was played 3 August 1930 and the last match was played 7 June 1931. GAIS won the league ahead of runners-up AIK, while Redbergslids IK and Sandvikens IF were relegated.

== Participating clubs ==
Location of the participating clubs

Club	Last season	First season in league	First season of current spell
AIK	5th	1924–25	1924–25
IF Elfsborg	8th	1926–27	1926–27
IFK Eskilstuna	1st (Division 2 Norra)	1924–25	1930–31
GAIS	4th	1924–25	1924–25
IFK Göteborg	2nd	1924–25	1924–25
Hälsingborgs IF	1st	1924–25	1924–25
Landskrona BoIS	7th	1924–25	1924–25
IFK Malmö	10th	1924–25	1928–29
Redbergslids IK	1st (Division 2 Södra)	1930–31	1930–31
Sandvikens IF	9th	1929–30	1929–30
IK Sleipner	3rd	1924–25	1924–25
Örgryte IS	6th	1924–25	1924–25

== League table ==
Pos	Team	Pld	W	D	L	GF	GA	GD	Pts	Qualification or relegation
1	GAIS (C)	22	16	4	2	70	34	+36	36	
2	AIK	22	12	6	4	67	41	+26	30	
3	IFK Göteborg	22	13	4	5	45	31	+14	30	
4	Hälsingborgs IF	22	12	2	8	55	43	+12	26	
5	Landskrona BoIS	22	11	1	10	47	49	−2	23	
6	IFK Malmö	22	9	4	9	42	55	−13	22	
7	Örgryte IS	22	8	5	9	45	46	−1	21	
8	IK Sleipner	22	7	3	12	53	54	−1	17	
9	IFK Eskilstuna	22	6	3	13	45	58	−13	15	
10	IF Elfsborg	22	6	3	13	39	59	−20	15	
11	Redbergslid (R)	22	5	5	12	35	60	−25	15	Relegation to Division 2
12	Sandvikens IF (R)	22	6	2	14	39	52	−13	14	Relegation to Division 2

Rules for classification: 1) points; 2) goal difference; 3) number of goals scored.
(C) Champions; (R) Relegated

== Results ==
Home \ Away	AIK	IFE	IFKE	GAIS	IFKG	HIF	LBoIS	IFKM	RIK	SIF	IKS	ÖIS
AIK		4–1	1–1	2–3	3–1	5–1	4–5	9–0	3–2	2–1	3–2	1–1
IF Elfsborg	2–3		3–3	1–4	1–2	1–3	1–2	3–2	7–1	0–3	4–1	3–2
IFK Eskilstuna	4–2	2–3		1–2	7–1	1–2	0–1	2–0	1–2	0–2	2–6	4–2
GAIS	4–4	6–0	5–2		0–2	4–1	5–3	3–3	2–1	3–1	5–1	2–2
IFK Göteborg	2–2	4–0	6–0	0–5		1–0	2–1	2–1	1–1	0–0 (Note: The match IFK Göteborg–Sandvikens IF ended in a walkover for the away team, this match have been counted as 0–0 but two points to Sandvikens IF. The match was moved from its original starting time to a later starting time the same day, and was played with the result 4–1, but as Sandvikens IF and the referees were ready to play at the original time, the Swedish Football Association considered the match a walkover.)	3–2	3–1
Hälsingborgs IF	3–2	2–2	2–3	1–2	0–0		2–4	4–1	1–2	4–3	4–1	6–3
Landskrona BoIS	1–3	2–2	3–1	2–1	2–3	1–3		2–3	4–2	2–1	0–3	0–3
IFK Malmö	1–1	2–1	4–2	2–3	3–1	1–0	3–2		2–6	3–0	2–0	2–2
Redbergslids IK	0–3	3–1	1–1	1–1	1–6	1–5	0–1	3–3		1–4	1–0	1–6
Sandvikens IF	3–4	0–1	0–4	3–5	1–2	3–5	2–4	3–0	1–1		3–1	0–1
IK Sleipner	2–5	6–1	6–2	1–3	0–0	1–2	5–2	5–2	4–3	3–3		1–1
Örgryte IS	1–1	2–1	4–2	0–2	0–3	1–4	0–3	1–2	3–1	6–2	3–2	

Legend: Blue = home team win; Yellow = draw; Red = away team win.

== Top scorers ==
	Player	Nat	Club	Goals
1	John Nilsson	(Sweden)	GAIS	26
2	Harry Lundahl	(Sweden)	Hälsingborgs IF	19
3	Filip Johansson	(Sweden)	IFK Göteborg	17
3	Allan Mattiasson	(Sweden)	GAIS	17
5	Torsten Brost	(Sweden)	IFK Malmö	16
5	Bertil Carlsson	(Sweden)	IFK Eskilstuna	16
5	Per Kaufeldt	(Sweden)	AIK	16
5	Tore Keller	(Sweden)	IK Sleipner	16
5	Nils Svensson	(Sweden)	Landskrona BoIS	16

== Attendances ==
#	Club	Average	Highest
1	AIK	15,856	20,528
2	IFK Göteborg	10,400	20,050
3	Redbergslids IK	8,898	13,849
4	IFK Malmö	7,918	12,210
5	Örgryte IS	7,780	15,419
6	GAIS	7,422	13,986
7	IK Sleipner	6,017	8,661
8	Hälsingborgs IF	5,872	8,501
9	IFK Eskilstuna	4,575	7,736
10	IF Elfsborg	4,326	7,662
11	Sandvikens IF	2,983	4,625
12	Landskrona BoIS	2,913	5,424

== Sources ==
Print

- Alsiö, Martin; Frantz, Alf; Lindahl, Jimmy; Persson, Gunnar, eds. (2004). 100 år: Svenska fotbollförbundets jubileumsbok 1904-2004, del 2: statistiken. Vällingby: Stroemberg Media Group. ISBN 91-86184-59-8.
- Glanell, Tomas; Havik, Göran; Lindberg, Thomas; Persson, Gunnar; Ågren, Bengt, eds. (2004). 100 år: Svenska fotbollförbundets jubileumsbok 1904-2004, del 1. Vällingby: Stroemberg Media Group. ISBN 91-86184-59-8.
- Nylin, Lars (2004). Den nödvändiga boken om Allsvenskan: svensk fotboll från 1896 till idag, statistik, höjdpunkter lag för lag, klassiska bilder. Sundbyberg: Semic. ISBN 91-552-3168-3.
- Glanell, Thomas; Lundgren, Lars; Stark, Janne & Strömberg, Robert (1988). Persson, Gunnar (ed.). Allsvenskan genom tiderna. Stockholm: Strömbergs idrottsböcker. ISBN 91-86184-35-0.

Online

- Glenning, Clas (2008). "Sweden final tables". Archived from the original on 2009-10-18.
- "SFS-Bolletinen". Sveriges Fotbollshistoriker och Statistiker. 2008. Archived from the original on 3 October 2008.
- "svenskfotboll.se". Swedish Football Association. 2008. Archived from the original on 18 October 2008.
