= Hallands Fotbollförbund =

- Abbreviation: Hallands FF or HFF
- Purpose: District Football Association
- Location(s): Box 93 30103 Halmstad Halland County Sweden
- Chairman: Björn Andersson
- Website: http://halland.svenskfotboll.se/

The Hallands Fotbollförbund (Halland Football Association) is one of the 24 district organisations of the Swedish Football Association. It administers lower tier football in the historical province of Halland.

== Background ==
Hallands Fotbollförbund, commonly referred to as Hallands FF, is the governing body for football in the historical province of Halland which corresponds with modern-day Halland County. The Association currently has 99 member clubs. Based in Halmstad, the Association's Chairman is Johan Johqvist.

== Affiliated Members ==
The following clubs are affiliated to the Hallands FF:

- Alets IK
- Andersbergs IK
- Annebergs IF
- Arvidstorps IK
- BK Astrio
- BK Viljan
- BK Walldia
- Bua IF
- Derome BK
- DFK Hasko
- Falkenbergs FF
- FF Serbiska Halmstad
- Frillesås FF
- Galgbackens IF
- Galtabäcks BK
- Genevad/Veinge IF
- Getinge IF
- Glommens IF
- GoIF Ginsten
- Grimetons IK
- Grimmareds IF
- Gullbrandstorps AIS
- H Å FF
- Halmstads BK
- Harplinge IK
- Hasslövs IS
- Haverdal IF
- Hishults AIS
- Hyltebruks IF
- IF Älvena
- IF Böljan
- IF Centern
- IF Leikin
- IF Norvalla
- IFK Bänared
- IFK Fjärås
- IFK Varberg
- Inka FK
- IS Halmia
- IS Örnia
- Karl-Gustavs BK
- Knäreds IK
- Kornhult/Hishult FF
- Kornhults IK
- Kullavik IF
- Kung Karl Bollklubb
- Kungsäters IF
- Kungsbacka IF
- Kurdiska IF Halmstad
- Kvibille BK
- Laholms FK
- Landeryd/Långaryds FF
- Långås IF
- Lerkils IF
- Lidhults GOIF
- Lilla Tjärby IK
- Lilla Träslövs FF
- Löftadalens IF
- Morups IF
- Onsala BK
- Oskarströms IS
- Ränneslövs GIF
- Rinia IF
- Rolfstorps GOIF
- Särö IK
- Sennans IF
- Serbiska KIF Halmstad
- Simlångsdalens IF
- Skällinge BK
- Skogaby BK
- Skottorps IF
- Skrea IF
- Slöinge GOIF
- Snöstorp Nyhem FF
- Sperlingsholms IF
- Stafsinge IF
- Tofta GOIF
- Tölö IF
- Torup/Rydö FF
- Träslövsläge IF
- Trönninge BK
- Trönninge IF
- Tvååkers IF
- Ullareds IK
- Valinge IF
- Vallda FF Kungsbacka
- Vapnö IF
- Varbergs BoIS FC
- Varbergs GIF FK
- Väröbacka GOIF
- Våxtorps BOIS
- Veddige BK
- Vessigebro BK
- Vinbergs IF
- Ysby BK
- Åsa IF
- Åsklosters IF
- Ätrafors BK
- Ätrans FF

== League Competitions ==
Hallands FF run the following League Competitions:

=== Men's Football ===
Division 4 - two sections
Division 5 - two sections
Division 6 - three sections

=== Women's Football ===
Division 3 - one section
Division 4 - two sections
Division 5 - three sections
