= Osborn Larsson =

Swedish footballer

Personal information
- Full name: Osborn Larsson
- Date of birth: 30 May 1951 (age 75)
- Place of birth: Kungshamn, Sweden
- Position: Defender

Youth career
- Stångenäs

Senior career*
| Years | Team | Apps | (Gls) |
| 1974–1982 | GAIS | 193 | (4) |
| Total | | 193 | (4) |
- * Club domestic league appearances and goals

Osborn Larsson (born 30 May 1951) is a Swedish retired footballer (defender) who most notably played for GAIS in Swedish football division Allsvenskan. Osborn was born in Kungshamn, Sweden. He transferred to GAIS from Stångenäs in 1974. He played 193 games as left back for GAIS, scoring 4 goals, before he left in 1982. Osborn became a legend in GAIS and is still mentioned in various cheers.
