= 1953–54 Allsvenskan =

30th season of Allsvenskan

Allsvenskan
- Season: 1953–54
- Champions: GAIS
- Relegated: Sandvikens IF; Jönköpings Södra IF; IF Elfsborg
- Top goalscorer: Karl-Alfred Jacobsson, GAIS (21)
- Average attendance: 12,483

These are the statistics of season 1953–54 of Allsvenskan, the highest level of the Swedish football league system.

== Overview ==
The league was contested by 12 teams, with GAIS winning the championship.

== League table ==
| Pos | Team | Pld | W | D | L | GF | GA | GD | Pts | Qualification or relegation |
|---|---|---|---|---|---|---|---|---|---|---|
| 1 | GAIS (C) | 22 | 10 | 7 | 5 | 46 | 39 | +7 | 27 | |
| 2 | Hälsingborgs IF | 22 | 11 | 4 | 7 | 41 | 30 | +11 | 26 | |
| 3 | Degerfors IF | 22 | 10 | 5 | 7 | 30 | 34 | −4 | 25 | |
| 4 | AIK | 22 | 10 | 4 | 8 | 47 | 31 | +16 | 24 | |
| 5 | IFK Norrköping | 22 | 6 | 12 | 4 | 33 | 28 | +5 | 24 | |
| 6 | Djurgårdens IF | 22 | 7 | 8 | 7 | 44 | 30 | +14 | 22 | |
| 7 | Malmö FF | 22 | 8 | 6 | 8 | 33 | 30 | +3 | 22 | |
| 8 | IFK Göteborg | 22 | 7 | 8 | 7 | 22 | 26 | −4 | 22 | |
| 9 | Kalmar FF | 22 | 9 | 3 | 10 | 33 | 42 | −9 | 21 | |
| 10 | Sandvikens IF (R) | 22 | 7 | 5 | 10 | 29 | 37 | −8 | 19 | Relegation to Division 2 |
| 11 | Jönköpings Södra IF (R) | 22 | 6 | 5 | 11 | 34 | 41 | −7 | 17 | Relegation to Division 2 |
| 12 | IF Elfsborg (R) | 22 | 5 | 5 | 12 | 24 | 48 | −24 | 15 | Relegation to Division 2 |

Rules for classification: 1) points; 2) goal difference; 3) number of goals scored.
(C) Champions; (R) Relegated

== Results ==
| Home \ Away | AIK | DEG | DJU | GAIS | HIF | IFE | IFKG | IFKN | JS | KFF | MFF | SIF |
|---|---|---|---|---|---|---|---|---|---|---|---|---|
| AIK | | 1–2 | 0–0 | 1–1 | 4–1 | 0–2 | 1–1 | 5–1 | 3–0 | 5–0 | 0–1 | 1–3 |
| Degerfors IF | 3–1 | | 0–0 | 0–1 | 1–0 | 2–1 | 0–1 | 2–2 | 2–0 | 1–0 | 2–2 | 3–1 |
| Djurgårdens IF | 2–3 | 1–1 | | 2–2 | 2–2 | 6–0 | 5–0 | 0–1 | 5–0 | 3–0 | 4–1 | 2–1 |
| GAIS | 1–5 | 4–1 | 5–3 | | 2–3 | 1–0 | 1–1 | 2–2 | 1–6 | 3–1 | 3–0 | 3–1 |
| Hälsingborgs IF | 1–3 | 3–1 | 4–1 | 2–3 | | 4–0 | 0–0 | 0–3 | 2–1 | 5–0 | 3–3 | 1–0 |
| IF Elfsborg | 1–1 | 3–4 | 2–2 | 1–5 | 0–3 | | 1–0 | 1–0 | 2–3 | 2–1 | 2–0 | 1–2 |
| IFK Göteborg | 1–4 | 3–1 | 2–0 | 1–2 | 1–0 | 1–1 | | 1–1 | 2–2 | 1–0 | 1–0 | 0–1 |
| IFK Norrköping | 4–1 | 1–2 | 0–0 | 2–2 | 2–0 | 1–1 | 2–2 | | 2–1 | 3–0 | 0–0 | 1–1 |
| Jönköpings Södra | 3–0 | 0–0 | 0–3 | 0–0 | 0–2 | 3–0 | 1–1 | 2–2 | | 2–3 | 2–3 | 1–2 |
| Kalmar FF | 3–1 | 3–1 | 2–1 | 3–2 | 1–1 | 4–1 | 2–1 | 3–3 | 2–3 | | 0–1 | 2–1 |
| Malmö FF | 0–3 | 6–0 | 2–0 | 1–1 | 1–2 | 3–0 | 0–2 | 2–0 | 1–2 | 0–0 | | 4–1 |
| Sandvikens IF | 0–4 | 0–1 | 2–2 | 3–1 | 1–2 | 2–2 | 1–0 | 0–0 | 3–2 | 1–2 | 2–2 | |

Legend: Blue = home team win; Yellow = draw; Red = away team win.

== Attendances ==
| # | Club | Average | Highest |
|---|---|---|---|
| 1 | AIK | 20,746 | 38,488 |
| 2 | GAIS | 17,091 | 30,615 |
| 3 | Djurgårdens IF | 16,477 | 24,805 |
| 4 | Malmö FF | 16,358 | 20,860 |
| 5 | IFK Göteborg | 15,331 | 21,565 |
| 6 | Hälsingborgs IF | 11,282 | 26,154 |
| 7 | Kalmar FF | 10,781 | 14,455 |
| 8 | Sandvikens IF | 10,682 | 13,792 |
| 9 | IFK Norrköping | 9,044 | 14,648 |
| 10 | IF Elfsborg | 7,786 | 12,260 |
| 11 | Jönköpings Södra IF | 7,067 | 10,814 |
| 12 | Degerfors IF | 6,835 | 10,016 |
