= Kållered SK =

Swedish football club

- Full name: Kållered Sportklubb
- Nickname: KSK
- Founded: 1938
- Ground: Kållereds IP; Kållered; Sweden
- Head coach: Bengt Andersson
- League: Division 2 Västra Götaland
- 2010: Division 3 Mellersta Götaland, 2nd (Promoted)
Home colours

Kållered SK is a Swedish football club located in Kållered in Mölndal Municipality, Västra Götaland County.

== Background ==
Kållered SK is a sports club from Kållered and was formed on 9 December 1938. The club is also known as Kållereds SK and specialises in bandy, football and ice hockey. In the beginning the club only played bandy and was therefore named Kålleryds Bandyklubb. However other sports were quickly taken up, including athletics and orienteering, and on 3 March 1939 the club changed its name to Kållereds Sportklubb. KSK is a now a rather large club playing in many different age groups and classes.

Since their foundation Kållered SK has participated mainly in the middle and lower divisions of the Swedish football league system. In the 2010 season the club played in Division 3 Mellersta Götaland, which is the fifth tier of Swedish football, and has won promotion to Division 2 via the play-offs drawing 2–2 on aggregate with IFK Hässleholm but winning on away goals. This is the first time that KSK has reached Division 2. They play their home matches at the Kållereds IP in Kållered.

Kållered SK are affiliated to the Göteborgs Fotbollförbund.

== Season to season ==
Season	Level	Division	Section	Position	Movements
1993	Tier 4	Division 3	Mellersta Götaland	4th	
1994	Tier 4	Division 3	Mellersta Götaland	9th	Relegation Playoffs – Relegated
1995	Tier 5	Division 4	Göteborg A	2nd	Promotion Playoffs
1996	Tier 5	Division 4	Göteborg A	1st	Promoted
1997	Tier 4	Division 3	Mellersta Götaland	12th	Relegated
1998	Tier 5	Division 4	Göteborg B	3rd	
1999	Tier 5	Division 4	Göteborg B	2nd	
2000	Tier 5	Division 4	Göteborg B	8th	
2001	Tier 5	Division 4	Göteborg B	2nd	Promotion Playoffs – Promoted
2002	Tier 4	Division 3	Nordvästra Götaland	7th	
2003	Tier 4	Division 3	Nordvästra Götaland	4th	
2004	Tier 4	Division 3	Mellersta Götaland	9th	Relegation Playoffs – Relegated
2005	Tier 5	Division 4	Göteborg B	2nd	Promoted
2006*	Tier 5	Division 3	Mellersta Götaland	8th	
2007	Tier 5	Division 3	Nordvästra Götaland	10th	Relegated
2008	Tier 6	Division 4	Göteborg B	4th	
2009	Tier 6	Division 4	Göteborg B	1st	Promoted
2010	Tier 5	Division 3	Mellersta Götaland	2nd	Promotion Playoffs – Promoted
2011	Tier 4	Division 2	Västra Götaland	10th	Relegation Playoffs – Relegated
2012	Tier 5	Division 3	Mellersta Götaland		

* League restructuring in 2006 resulted in a new division being created at Tier 3 and subsequent divisions dropping a level.

== Attendances ==
In recent seasons Kållered SK have had the following average attendances:

Season	Average attendance	Division / Section	Level
2005	Not available	Div 4 Göteborg B	Tier 5
2006	62	Div 3 Mellersta Götaland	Tier 5
2007	78	Div 3 Nordvästra Götaland	Tier 5
2008	Not available	Div 4 Göteborg B	Tier 6
2009	Not available	Div 4 Göteborg B	Tier 6
2010	117	Div 3 Mellersta Götaland	Tier 5

* Attendances are provided in the Publikliga sections of the Svenska Fotbollförbundet website.
