= Tölö IF =

Swedish football club

- Full name: Tölö Idrottsförening
- Founded: 1932
- Ground: Hamravallen; Kungsbacka; Sweden
- Chairman: Ronny Norberg
- League: Division 4 Halland Elit
Home colours

Tölö IF is a Swedish football club located in Kungsbacka.

== Background ==
Tölö IF currently plays in Division 4 Halland Elit which is the sixth tier of Swedish football. They play their home matches at the Hamravallen in Kungsbacka.

The club is affiliated to Hallands Fotbollförbund. Tölö IF have competed in the Svenska Cupen on 1 occasion and have played 1 match in the competition.

== Season to season ==
Season	Level	Division	Section	Position	Movements
2006*	Tier 6	Division 4	Halland	6th	
2007	Tier 6	Division 4	Halland	8th	Play-offs
2008	Tier 6	Division 4	Halland Elit	6th	
2009	Tier 6	Division 4	Halland Elit	9th	
2010	Tier 6	Division 4	Halland Elit	7th	
2011	Tier 6	Division 4	Halland Elit	1st	Promoted

* League restructuring in 2006 resulted in a new division being created at Tier 3 and subsequent divisions dropping a level.

== Notable players ==
- (Sweden) Bengt Andersson
- (Sweden) Fridolina Rolfö
- (Sweden) Gustav Lundgren
