= Galtabäcks BK =

Swedish football club

- Full name: Galtabäcks Bollklubb
- Founded: 1930
- Ground: Galtabäcks IP, Tvååker, Sweden
- League: Division 4 Halland
Home colours

Galtabäcks BK is a Swedish football club located in Tvååker.

== Background ==
Galtabäcks BK currently plays in Division 4 Halland which is the sixth tier of Swedish football. They play their home matches at the Galtabäcks IP in Tvååker.

The club is affiliated to Hallands Fotbollförbund. Galtabäcks BK played in the 2011 Svenska Cupen but lost 0–9 at home to Alingsås IF in the preliminary round.

== Season to season ==
Season	Level	Division	Section	Position	Movements
2006*	Tier 7	Division 5	Halland Norra	12th	Relegated
2007	Tier 8	Division 6	Halland Norra	5th	Promoted
2008	Tier 7	Division 5	Halland Norra	1st	Promoted
2009	Tier 6b	Division 4	Halland	8th	
2010	Tier 6b	Division 4	Halland	5th	
2011	Tier 6b	Division 4	Halland	12th	Relegated

* League restructuring in 2006 resulted in a new division being created at Tier 3 and subsequent divisions dropping a level.
