= Onsala BK =

Swedish football club

- Full name: Onsala Bollklubb
- Nickname: Onsala
- Short name: OBK
- Founded: 1941
- Ground: Rydets IP; Onsala; Sweden
- Chairman: Johan Gometz
- Coach: Christoffer Gustavsson, Fredrik Holmberg
- League: Ettan Södra
- 2024: Ettan Södra, 16th (relegated)
Home colours	Away colours

Onsala BK is a Swedish football club located in Onsala. Onsala BK is the biggest football club in Halland, with over a thousand active players, both boys and girls.

== Background ==
Onsala BK currently plays in Swedish football Division 2. They play their home matches at the Rydets IP in Onsala. In the clubs early years, they also played bandy.

The club is affiliated to Hallands Fotbollförbund. Onsala BK played in the 2011 Svenska Cupen and won 1–0 against Dalstorps IF in the preliminary round before losing 0–3 at home to Lindome GIF in the first round. Onsala BK competed again in 2016-17 Svenska Cupen where they won over Västra Frölunda IF in the first round 4–2 but then lost 6–0 to the Superettan team Ängelholms FF.

== Squad 2024 ==
As of 8 August 2024

Number	Country	Player	Age
Målvakter
1	Sweden	Gustav Thilander	24
73	Sweden	Isac Iserö	21
99	Sweden	Magnus Sandström	19
Försvarare
2	Sweden	Hugo Björnberg	24
3	Sweden	Alexander Levinson	29
4	Sweden	Johan Jarnvik	29
5	Sweden	Sebastian Heaver	26
13	Sweden	Anton Börjesson	19
15	Sweden	Ville Hilvenius	18
19	Sweden	Sebastian Parker	21
21	Sweden	Maximilian Wennergrund	20
22	Sweden	John Wettergren	19
Mittfältare
6	Sweden	Magnus Johansson	25
7	Sweden	Joel Palmqvist	29
8	Sweden	William Berglund	23
12	Sweden	Victor Glaerum	28
14	Sweden	Felix Wennergrund	23
17	Sweden	Hugo Jedenberg	21
18	Sweden	Adam Fogelblad	28
23	Sweden	Victor Olofsson	25
Anfallare
9	Sweden	Victor Andersson	29
10	Sweden	Hugo Lindström	21
11	Sweden	Hampus Ekdahl	27
16	Sweden	Alfons Nygaard	22
20	Sweden	Lucas Heed	20

== Season to season ==
Season	Level	Division	Section	Position	Movements
1993	Tier 4	Division 3	Sydvästra Götaland	4th	
1994	Tier 4	Division 3	Nordvästra Götaland	9th	Relegation Playoffs – Relegated
1995	Tier 5	Division 4	Halland	2nd	Promotion Playoffs
1996	Tier 5	Division 4	Halland	11th	Relegated
1997	Tier 6	Division 5	Halland Norra		
1998	Tier 6	Division 5	Halland Norra		Promoted
1999	Tier 5	Division 4	Halland	11th	Relegated
2000	Tier 6	Division 5	Halland Norra	1st	Promoted
2001	Tier 5	Division 4	Halland	8th	
2002	Tier 5	Division 4	Halland	10th	Relegation Playoffs – Relegated
2003	Tier 6	Division 5	Halland Norra	6th	
2004	Tier 6	Division 5	Halland Norra	12th	Relegated
2005	Tier 7	Division 6	Halland Norra	4th	
2006*	Tier 8	Division 6	Halland Norra	6th	
2007	Tier 8	Division 6	Halland Norra	7th	
2008	Tier 8	Division 6	Halland Norra	2nd	Promoted
2009	Tier 7	Division 5	Halland Norra	3rd	
2010	Tier 7	Division 5	Halland Norra	2nd	
2011	Tier 7	Division 5	Halland Norra	1st	Promoted
2012	Tier 7	Division 4	Halland	3rd	Promoted
2013	Tier 6	Div 4 elit Halland	Halland	10th	
2014	Tier 6	Div 4 elit Halland	Halland	7th	
2015	Tier 6	Div 4 elit Halland	Halland	4th	
2016	Tier 6	Division 4	Halland	1st	Promoted
2017	Tier 5	Division 3	Sydvästra Götaland	3rd	
2018	Tier 5	Division 3	Sydvästra Götaland	1st	Promoted
2019	Tier 4	Division 2	Västra Götaland	4th	
2020	Tier 4	Division 2	Västra Götaland	8th	
2021	Tier 4	Division 2	Västra Götaland	4th	
2022	Tier 4	Division 2	Västra Götaland	5th	
2023	Tier 4	Division 2	Västra Götaland	1st	Promoted
2024	Tier 3	Ettan	Södra	16th	Relegated
2025	Tier 4	Division 2	Västra Götaland	4th	

* League restructuring in 2006 resulted in a new division being created at Tier 3 and subsequent divisions dropping a level.

2016 This is one of the best years in Onsala BK's history. They won Swedish football Division 4 Halland with a margin of 15 points, just losing one game all season. Onsala got promoted and started playing in Swedish football Division 3 Sydvästra Götaland in 2017.

2018: Just 2 years after being promoted to Sydvästra Götaland, they once again got promoted, this time into Västra Götland.
