= Anes Čardaklija =

Bosnian footballer (born 2005)

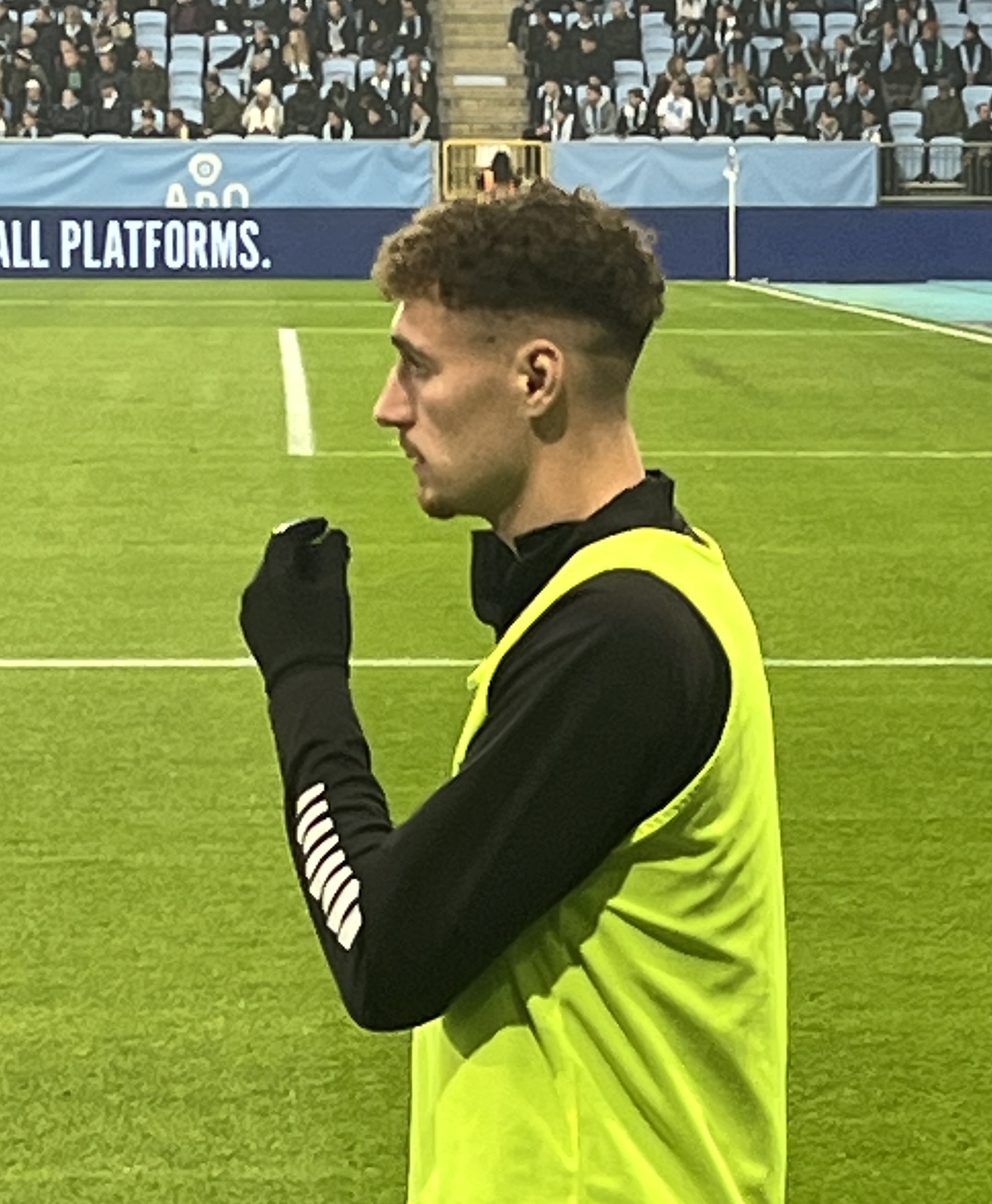
- Cardaklija in November 2025

Personal information
- Date of birth: 5 July 2005 (age 21)
- Place of birth: Sweden
- Height: 1.94 m (6 ft 4 in)
- Position: Defender

Team information
- Current team: GAIS
- Number: 22

Youth career
- 2011–2022: GAIS

Senior career*
Years	Team	Apps	(Gls)
2022–	GAIS	53	(2)

International career
2023	Sweden U18	5	(0)
2023	Sweden U19	2	(0)
2024–2026	Bosnia and Herzegovina U21	2	(0)
- * Club domestic league appearances and goals as of 8 July 2026

Anes Čardaklija (born 5 July 2005) is a footballer who plays as a defender for Allsvenskan club GAIS. Born in Sweden, he represents Bosnia and Herzegovina at youth level.

== Club career ==
Čardaklija started his football career at the age of 6 in Gothenburg, in the academy of GAIS. His time in the academy had its ups and downs, with one particular coach stating that Čardaklija "could rather start working at Burger King". On 30 August 2022, he was chosen to start the GAIS match against IFK Värnamo in the 2022–23 Svenska Cupen. GAIS, a third-tier team at the time, eliminated the first-tier team. In the league, Čardaklija made his senior debut on 3 September 2022. GAIS experienced two straight promotions in 2022 and 2023. He made his Superettan debut in June 2023 and his Allsvenskan debut in March 2024.

By that time, Čardaklija was scouted by "several" German and British clubs.

== International career ==
Čardaklija made his international youth debut for Sweden U18 in 2023. He played twice against Wales, then against Poland and Norway in a U18 four-nation tournament. In November 2023 he played against Switzerland and Italy during the 2024 UEFA European Under-19 Championship qualification. In August 2024 he changed his international football allegiance to Bosnia Herzegovina. He made his debut for Bosnia and Herzegovina U21 in September 2024.

== Career statistics ==
=== Club ===
As of match played 7 July 2026

Appearances and goals by club, season and competition
Club	Season	League			National cup (Note: Includes Svenska Cupen)		Total	
Club	Season	Division	Apps	Goals	Apps	Goals	Apps	Goals
GAIS	2022	Ettan Fotboll	2	0	—		2	0
GAIS	2023	Superettan	17	1	2	0	19	1
GAIS	2024	Allsvenskan	17	0	3	0	20	0
GAIS	2025	Allsvenskan	7	0	2	0	9	0
GAIS	2026	Allsvenskan	10	1	2	0	10	1
GAIS	Total		53	2	9	0	62	2
Career total			53	2	9	0	62	2
