= Kungsbacka IF =

Swedish football club

- Full name: Kungsbacka Idrottsförening
- Nickname: KIF
- Founded: 2005
- Ground: Tingbergsvallen; Kungsbacka; Sweden
- League: Division 4 Halland Elit
Home colours

Kungsbacka IF is a Swedish football club located in Kungsbacka.

== Background ==
Kungsbacka IF currently plays in Division 4 Halland Elit which is the sixth tier of Swedish football. They play their home matches at the Tingbergsvallen in Kungsbacka.

The club is affiliated to Hallands Fotbollförbund. Kungsbacka BI/Kungsbacka IF have competed in the Svenska Cupen on 24 occasions and have played 60 matches in the competition.

== Season to season ==
Season	Level	Division	Section	Position	Movements
1993	Tier 3	Division 2	Västra Götaland	7th	
1994	Tier 3	Division 2	Västra Götaland	7th	
1995	Tier 3	Division 2	Västra Götaland	11th	Relegation Playoffs
1996	Tier 3	Division 2	Västra Götaland	11th	Relegated
1997	Tier 4	Division 3	Mellersta Götaland	9th	Relegation Playoffs – Relegated
1998	Tier 5	Division 4	Halland	5th	
1999	Tier 5	Division 4	Halland	8th	
2000	Tier 5	Division 4	Halland	12th	Relegated
2001	Tier 6	Division 5	Halland Norra	12th	Relegated
2002	Tier 7	Division 6	Halland Norra	5th	
2003	Tier 7	Division 6	Halland Norra	8th	
2004	Tier 7	Division 6	Halland Norra	6th	
2005	Tier 7	Division 6	Halland Norra	3rd	Promotion Playoffs – Promoted
2006*	Tier 7	Division 5	Halland Norra	3rd	
2007	Tier 7	Division 5	Halland Norra	2nd	Promotion Playoffs – Promoted
2008	Tier 6	Division 4	Halland Elit	3rd	
2009	Tier 6	Division 4	Halland Elit	2nd	
2010	Tier 6	Division 4	Halland Elit	3rd	
2011	Tier 6	Division 4	Halland Elit	7th	
2012	Tier 6	Division 4	Halland Elit	5th	
2013	Tier 6	Division 4	Halland Elit	4th	

* League restructuring in 2006 resulted in a new division being created at Tier 3 and subsequent divisions dropping a level.

* * The club was known as Kungsbacka BI until 2005.
