= Redbergslids IK Fotboll =

Redbergslids IK
- Full name: Redbergslids Idrottsklubb
- Founded: 1916
- Dissolved: 2001
colours

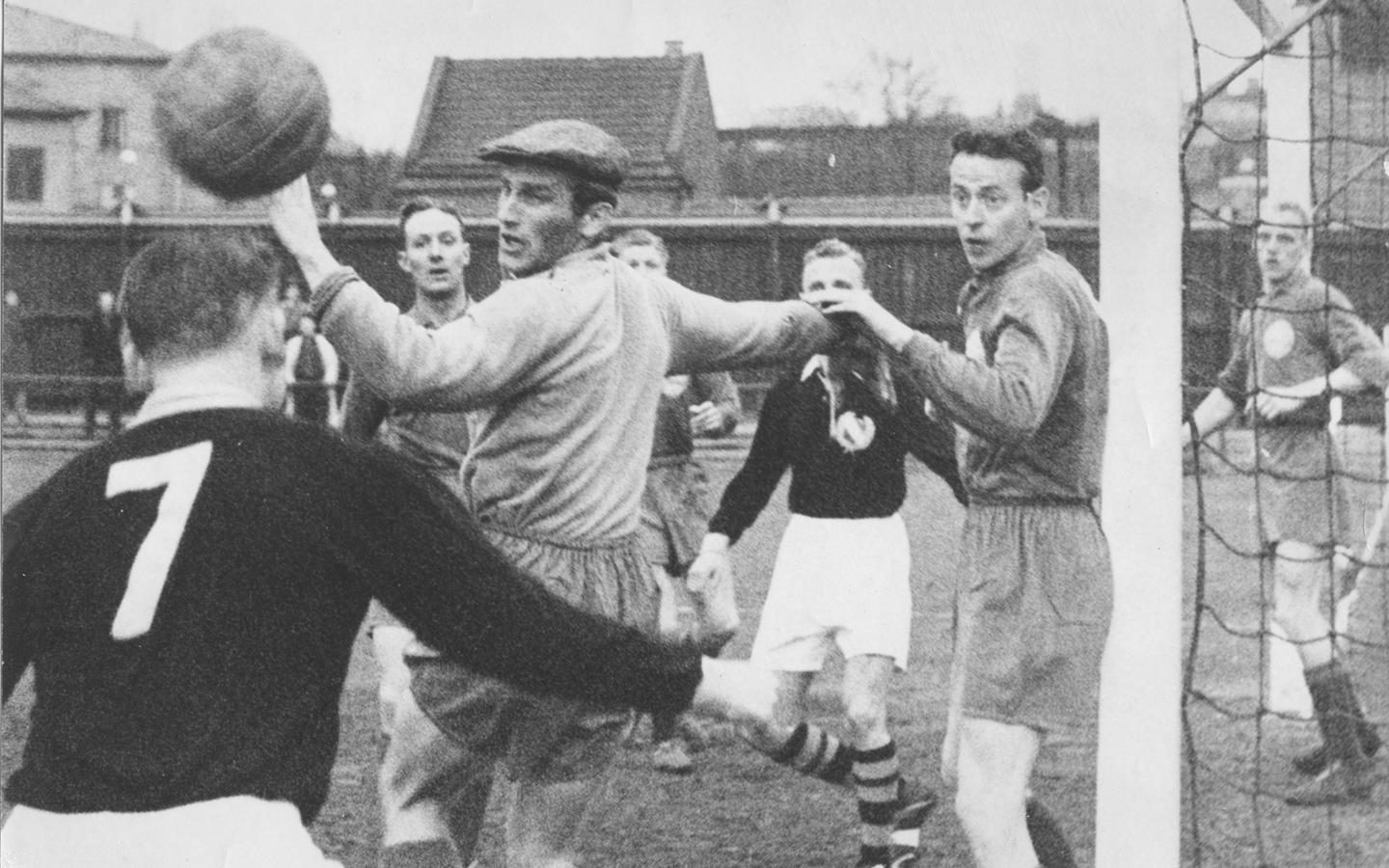
Redbergslids IK against Skogens IF in 1956

Redbergslids IK was a football club located in Gothenburg that played in the 1930–31 Allsvenskan, the Swedish top-tier league.

== History ==
The football team was a part of the sports club Redbergslids IK founded in 1916. In the 1929–30 season, they reached Allsvenskan by winning Division 2 Södra 11 points ahead of Malmö FF. The following season, 1930–31, they played in the Allsvenskan but were relegated. In the top division of Sweden the club attracted an average crowd of 8,898.

They were also punished for paying their players, which was against the rules at that time, when they gifted their players watches, by being demoted to the bottom of the Swedish football league system, Göteborgsserien IV. A result of this, Redbergslid lost their players to local teams IFK Göteborg, GAIS and Örgryte. For instance, Swedish internationals Rolf Gardtman and Sven Rydell moved to Örgryte.

In the 1960s, the club was back in Division 2 Södra and remained there a couple of seasons. Redbergslid played their last season in 2001, when they resided in the Swedish eighth-tier Division 7.

The team used black shirts and white shorts.
