= Kungsbacka =

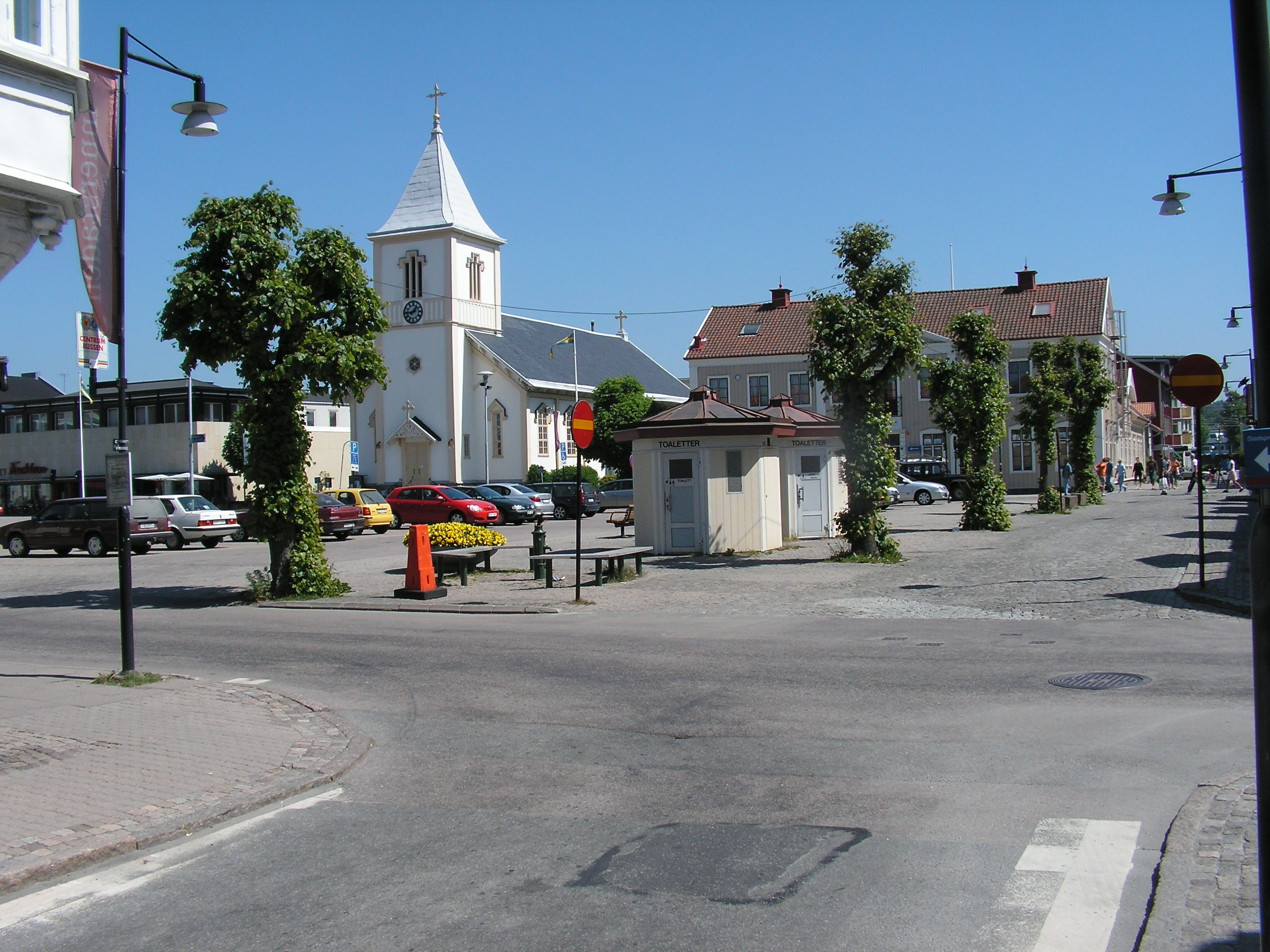
- Kungsbacka

- Coat of arms

- Location within Halland Location within Sweden
- Coordinates: 57°29′N 12°04′E
- Country: Sweden
- Province: Halland
- County: Halland County
- Municipality: Kungsbacka Municipality

Government
  - Mayor: Lisa Andersson

Area
  - Total: 10.03 km^{2} (3.87 sq mi)

Population (31 December 2018)
  - Total: 23,000
  - Density: 1,901/km^{2} (4,920/sq mi)
- Time zone: UTC+1 (CET)
  - Summer (DST): UTC+2 (CEST)

Kungsbacka (Swedish pronunciation: [kɵŋsˈbaˈka]) is a locality and the seat of Kungsbacka Municipality in Halland County, Sweden, with 19,057 inhabitants in 2010. It is a part of Greater Gothenburg (Göteborg) Metropolitan Area. The distance to Gothenburg is 25 km.

It is one of the most affluent parts of Sweden, in part due to its simultaneous proximity to the countryside and the large city of Gothenburg. Its mayor since 2020 is Lisa Andersson.

== History ==
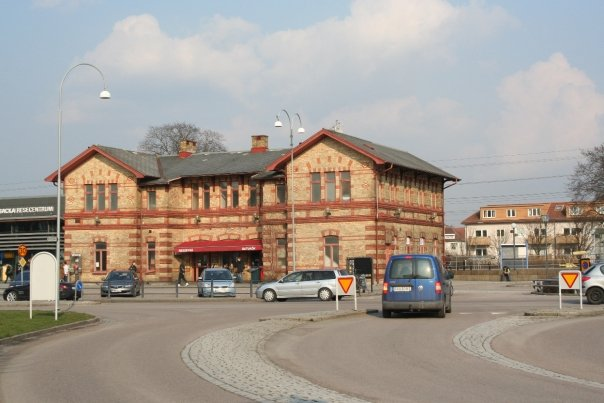
The old train station in Kungsbacka

The first records referring to Kungsbacka as a town date from the 15th century, when it was part of Denmark. By the time it was recognised as part of Sweden (1658), the river running through the town, on which some transportation of goods took place, was almost completely overgrown and despite pleas to restore its function, this did not occur. Some trade still took place from the coast, but the town's significance as a place of naval commerce declined over the centuries. Today, it is home to over 2,000 enterprises, and the river still runs through it.

A devastating fire in 1846 destroyed the town centre, sparing only a little red wooden cabin which still stands today. In late 2006 and early 2014 other fires affected the town centre, and construction work is ongoing to restore the loss of wooden buildings.

In the early 1900s the city was known for its low municipal tax rates, which were by 1931 second only to those of Djursholm. This made the town a popular place of residence for wealthy pensioners. As a result, Kungsbacka was one of the few cities in Sweden were The Right remained the largest party, even when the Swedish Social Democratic Party won a nationwide majority during the elections of 1940.

The town remained small until the 1960s. The municipal reform of 1971 made it the seat of the much larger Kungsbacka Municipality. The town began to grow as a part of Metropolitan Gothenburg. It is the southern terminus of the Gothenburg commuter rail system, situated 28 km from central Gothenburg.

== Sister cities ==
The following cities are twinned with Kungsbacka:

- Saarijärvi, Central Finland, Finland
- Neiva, Huila, Colombia

== Notable people ==
- Bengt Andersson, football player
- Jonny Andersson, International motorcycle trials rider
- Torsten Billman 1909–1989. Artist, woodcut engraver and mural painter
- Lasse Brandeby, comic actor
- Christian Folin (born 1991), ice hockey player for Frölunder HC
- Lars Gathenhielm, 1689–1718. Pirate
- Calle Johansson, ice hockey player
- Fredrik Jacobson, golfer
- Hasse Jeppson 1925–2013. Football player. Sweden squad – 1950 FIFA World Cup, Third place
- Niklas Rubin, ice hockey goaltender
- Omar Rudberg, Singer in FO&O
- Ulrik Munther, Singer
- Fridolina Rolfö, football player for Sweden
- Alexander Jeremejeff, professional footballer for Persija Jakarta
- Erik Persson, Swedish 2016 Olympic and 2020 Olympic swimmer
- Anna Takanen, actor, director and writer, born in Kungsbacka

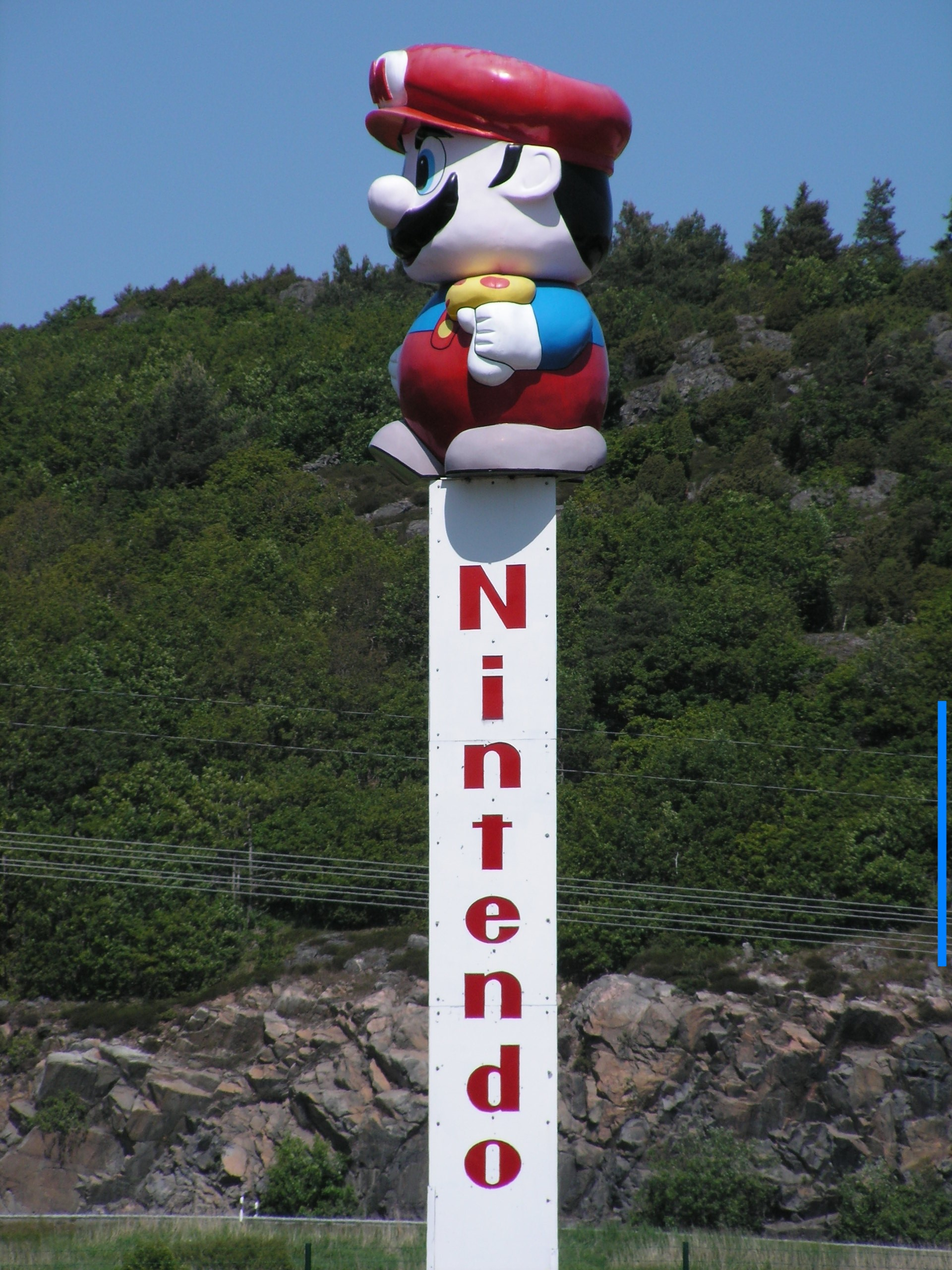
Mario statue in Kungsbacka, a landmark visible from the passing European route E6

== Sports ==
The following sports clubs are located in Kungsbacka:

- Varla IBK Floorball
- Kungsbacka IF
- Tölö IF
- HK Aranäs
- Kungsbacka Broncos Rugby league Club
