= GAIS =

Association football club in Sweden

- Full name: Göteborgs Atlet- & Idrottssällskap
- Nicknames: Makrillarna (the Mackerels); Grönsvart (Green-Black); Gårdakvarnen (The Gårda Mill); Atleterna (The Athletes)
- Founded: 11 March 1894; 132 years ago 1897; 129 years ago (football department)
- Ground: Gamla Ullevi, Gothenburg
- Capacity: 18,416
- Chairman: Stefan Tilk
- Head coach: Fredrik Holmberg
- League: Allsvenskan
- 2025: Allsvenskan, 3rd of 16
- Website: www.gais.se
Home colours	Away colours	Third colours

Göteborgs Atlet- och Idrottssällskap (meaning Gothenburg Athlete and Athletics Association), commonly referred to as GAIS or Gais, (Note: In the media, the name of the club is normally abbreviated "Gais", in accordance with Swedish writing standards that state that acronyms that are pronounced as a word, as opposed to letter by letter, should be spelled with the first letter in upper case and the remaining in lower case, thus "Gais". However, some fans of the club, as well as the club itself, prefer to use only uppercase, "GAIS", even though they also pronounce it as a word: [ˈɡǎɪs].) is a Swedish football club based in Gothenburg. The club is affiliated to the Göteborgs Fotbollförbund and play their home games at Gamla Ullevi. Fans also refers to the club as Grönsvart (green-black), or Makrillarna (the Mackerels) because of the traditional green and black striped shirt and white shorts.

GAIS is one of the oldest football clubs in Sweden. The club was a founding member of Allsvenskan and also the first champions of the league. They have won a total of four national championship titles, five league championship titles and one national cup title. Even though GAIS have played 55 seasons in Allsvenskan, as of 2024, they only spent six years in the top division during a 30-year period from 1976 to 2005, with another six seasons of that time spent as low as the third division. The club thus gained the reputation of being a yo-yo club, constantly going up and down through the league system. After their promotion in 2005 the club played seven straight seasons in Allsvenskan which was a feat not achieved since the degradation in 1955. After relegation in 2012 they stayed in Superettan until 2021, when they got relegated. After achieving back to back promotions in 2022 and 2023, GAIS played the 2024 season in Allsvenskan and finished in 6th place. In 2025, GAIS finished 3rd in the league, winning the "small silver" and also a spot in the 2026–27 UEFA Conference League.

== History ==
=== Formation and early glory ===
GAIS was founded 11 March 1894 at Edlunds Café in the Gothenburg city centre. The founders had created the club for "patriotic purposes and to promote all kinds of sports". Its main activities were athletics and an assortment of strength sports. The football department was formed in 1897 and played their first official game against local rivals Örgryte IS in 1903. GAIS first appearance in the highest league at the time, Svenska Serien, was in 1915/16 where they finished in fourth place. In 1919 the club won its first national championship beating Djurgårdens IF away in the finals. The same procedure would be repeated in 1922, this time against another Stockholm team, Hammarby IF. GAIS won the first season of the new first tier league Allsvenskan in 1924/25, two points ahead of local rivals IFK Göteborg. The feat was to be repeated in 1926/27, this time three points ahead of IFK Göteborg. The league champions was not recognised as national champions until the 1930/31 season, which GAIS also won, six points ahead of AIK and IFK Göteborg.

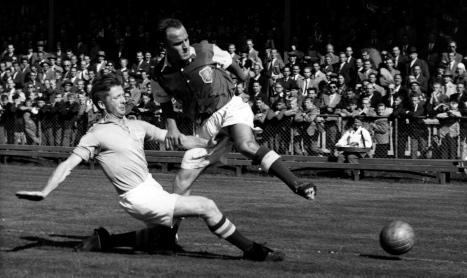
Sune Sandbring, Malmö FF in a game with Frank Jacobsson, GAIS in 1953.

During the 1930s GAIS slowly lost the dominance the club had exercised over Allsvenskan since its foundation and in 1938 the club was relegated. Having spent three years in the second division GAIS returned with a vengeance for the 1941–42 Allsvenskan where the club finished in second place. Later in 1942 they won Svenska Cupen for the first, and until today, only time.

The club then stayed in Allsvenskan throughout the 1940s and the early 1950s. They quite unexpectedly won their fourth national championship one single point ahead of Helsingborgs IF in the season of 1953/54. The clinching game was the last one of the season; a nail biting no score draw at Stadsparksvallen in Jönköping. The following year, equally unexpected, the club finished third last and was relegated.

=== 1960s and 1970s ===
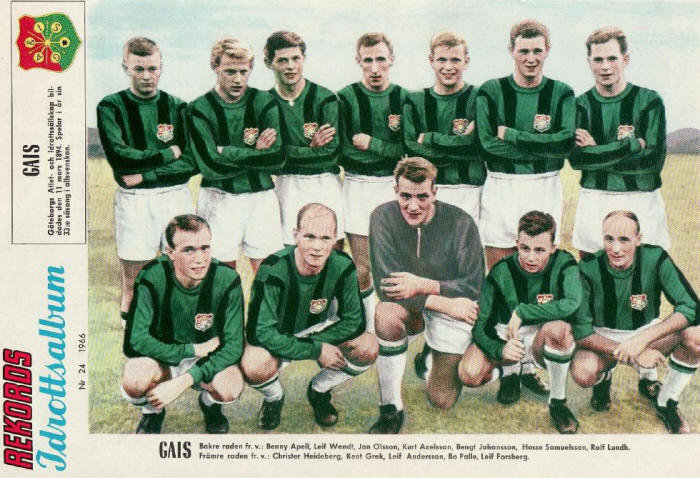
The newly promoted 1966 GAIS squad who helped reestablish the club in Allsvenskan during the late sixties.

GAIS returned to Allsvenskan the following 1955/56 season but from the mid-1950s the club lost its former continuity and never spent more than five consecutive seasons in Allsvenskan until the 2000s. The club was relegated again in 1959 and spent four seasons in the second division before returning briefly to Allsvenskan for one year in 1964. After that relegation they immediately returned to Allsvenskan in 1966. GAIS then remained there during 1966–1975, except for one year in the second division in 1971. In 1975 the club made its first appearance in the UEFA Cup playing Śląsk Wrocław in the first leg. GAIS lost out to the Polish club after winning 2–1 at home but losing 2–4 away. The same year GAIS got relegated from Allsvenskan for the sixth time, this time due to scoring two goals less than Halmstads BK.

=== Thirty years of underperformance: 1976–2006 ===
The relegation in 1975 would in retrospect prove to be a turning point for the worse in the history of GAIS. Unable to qualify for Allsvenskan in 1976, and furthermore losing the qualifying spot to now arch-rival IFK Göteborg, they lost the position as Gothenburg's leading team that they had enjoyed throughout the early 1970s. The club then consistently failed to qualify for Allsvenskan during the following five years and in 1981 the club got relegated to the Swedish third division due to economic conditions and a surprisingly weak performance by the squad. The future looked bleak after GAIS failed to return to the second division in 1982 but due to a massive performance on the pitch in the latter part of the 1983 season the club secured the qualifying spot seven points ahead of IK Oddevold and then beat Mönsterås GoIF in the promotion playoffs to the second division.

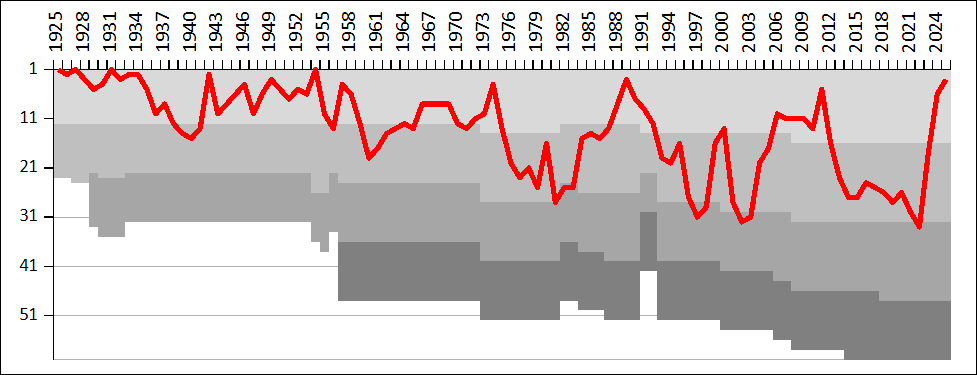
A chart showing the progress of GAIS through the Swedish football league system. The different shades of gray represent league divisions.

In 1984 GAIS made what was to become one of the club's most spectacular signings to this date. Tunisian midfielder Samir Bakaou left his former club Étoile Sportive du Sahel to join the Gothenburg side and proved to be the injection of flair and energy that the club had been needing so badly. With "the Black Pearl" as playmaker and notorious goalscorer GAIS was once again a force to be reckoned with and made it to the promotion playoffs to Allsvenskan in 1985, only to lose out to Djurgårdens IF after a penalty shoot-out in a highly controversial game. GAIS finally made it back to Allsvenskan in 1987 ending eleven long years of struggling in the lower divisions. For the second time in club history GAIS made it to the finals of Svenska Cupen as well, but lost out 2–0 to opposing side Kalmar FF.

During the late 1980s and early 1990s GAIS mostly fought for its survival in Allsvenskan. With the exception of a third place in 1989 the club had to settle for the lower half of the league table. Relegation followed in the season of 1992 and GAIS yet again had to face a long and tortuous walk through the Swedish second division. The nadir was reached in 1997 when the club had been relegated to the third division and ran a huge economical deficit while only finishing third in the league. This season would be the starting point of possibly the worst yo-yo experience any Swedish football club has ever experienced.

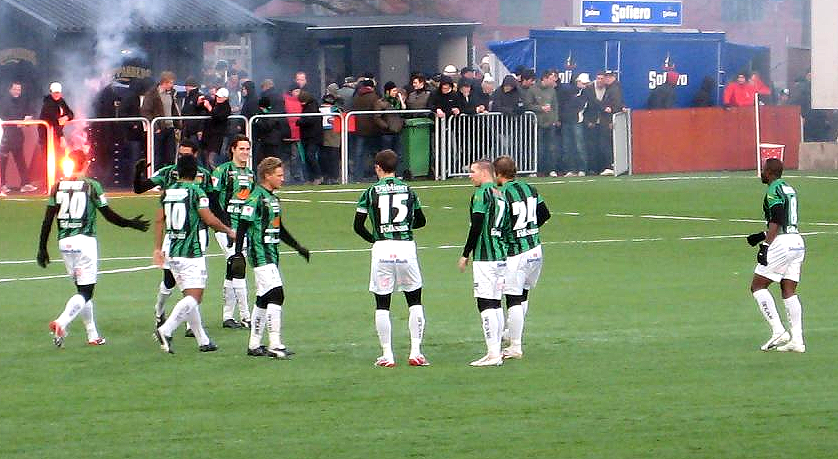
GAIS wearing their traditional green and black striped shirts during a preseason game in 2008.

GAIS was promoted to the second division in 1998 and made it back to Allsvenskan after the season of 1999 by finishing in second place and defeating Kalmar FF in the qualifying round. After finishing second to last in the 2000 Allsvenskan the club continued its fall through the second division Superettan in 2001 and was relegated to the third division for the 2002 season. From there on things slowed down when GAIS failed to make a quick return during their first season there. Then after a hard-fought battle throughout 2003 against local competitors Ljungskile SK GAIS finally ended up winning the series by goal difference. In the promotion playoffs to qualify for Superettan the club faced Mjällby AIF and defeated them 2–1 away as well as home.

The next year GAIS signed Roland Nilsson as head coach, and with him at the lead the club finished in sixth place of the 2004 Superettan. During the following season, facing competition from newly relegated AIK and Östers IF, GAIS managed to finish third and got to play Landskrona BoIS in the promotion playoffs to Allsvenskan. After beating Landskrona 2–1 at home and drawing them 0–0 in an extremely tight away game, where GAIS forward Wilton Figueiredo got his second yellow card after 30 minutes of play and manager Roland Nilsson substituted defender Kenneth Gustafsson for himself during the last 25 minutes, GAIS finally got to make their return to Allsvenskan. There they would spend their next seven seasons but after a strong fifth-place finish in 2011 they ended up in last place and relegated in 2012. They have since remained in the Swedish second tier until 2021 when they dropped out. In 2022 GAIS, played in third division only to skyrocket back through the following years and as of 2024 they are back in Allsvenskan.

== Supporters and rivalries ==
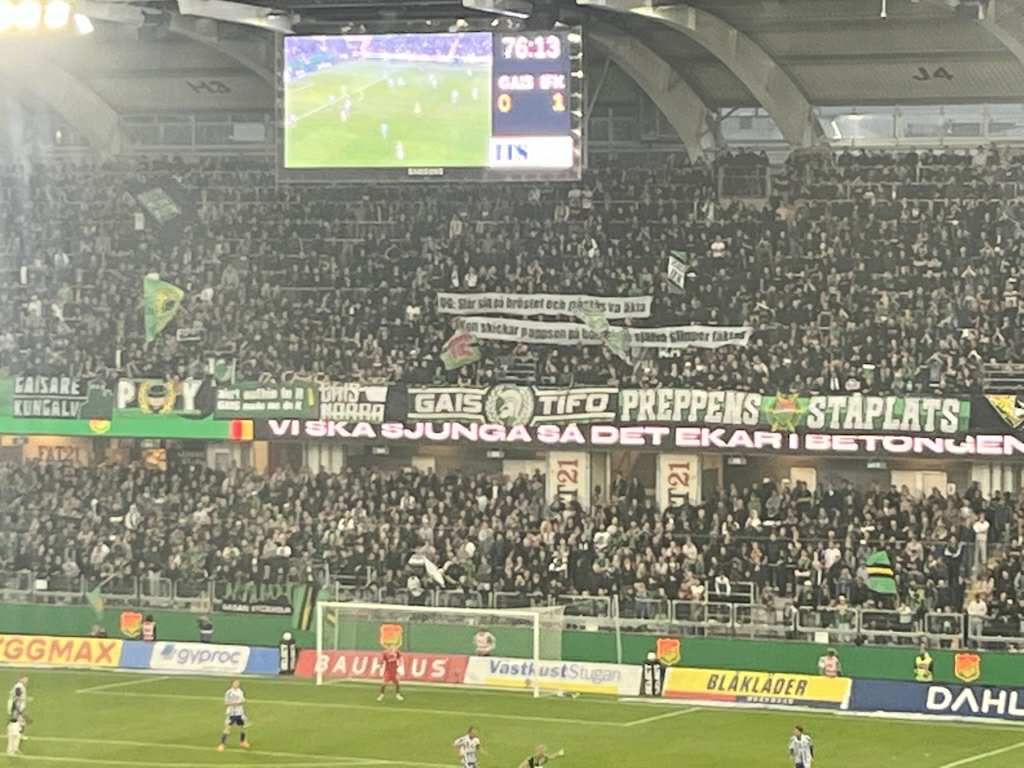
GAIS fans in their home game against IFK Göteborg in 2025

GAIS is Gothenburg's second most supported football club. GAIS has enjoyed continuous success in Allsvenskan and the amount of supporters attending GAIS home games has increased by a large percentage, from around 4 800 in Superettan to between 9 - 10 000 in Allsvenskan.

Its fan base has long been associated with working-class neighborhoods and left-wing sympathies, though this is not uniquely distinct compared to other clubs. Their supporters are also perceived as being loyal, despite whatever hardships the club may face. The most prominent supporter group, Makrillarna (meaning the Mackerels), was founded in 1961.

During the 2018 season the club chose to allow a supporter to act as an assisting manager for a single game, against Halmstads BK in September, which at the time were unique among Swedish football clubs.

The club and its supporters harbour a fierce rivalry with Gothenburg's other traditional working-class team IFK Göteborg. The pair first contested each other in September 1905 and remains one of Swedish football's oldest and most storied derbies in Sweden. As of August 2025, they have contested over 131 competitive matches, with IFK holding the edge in victories.

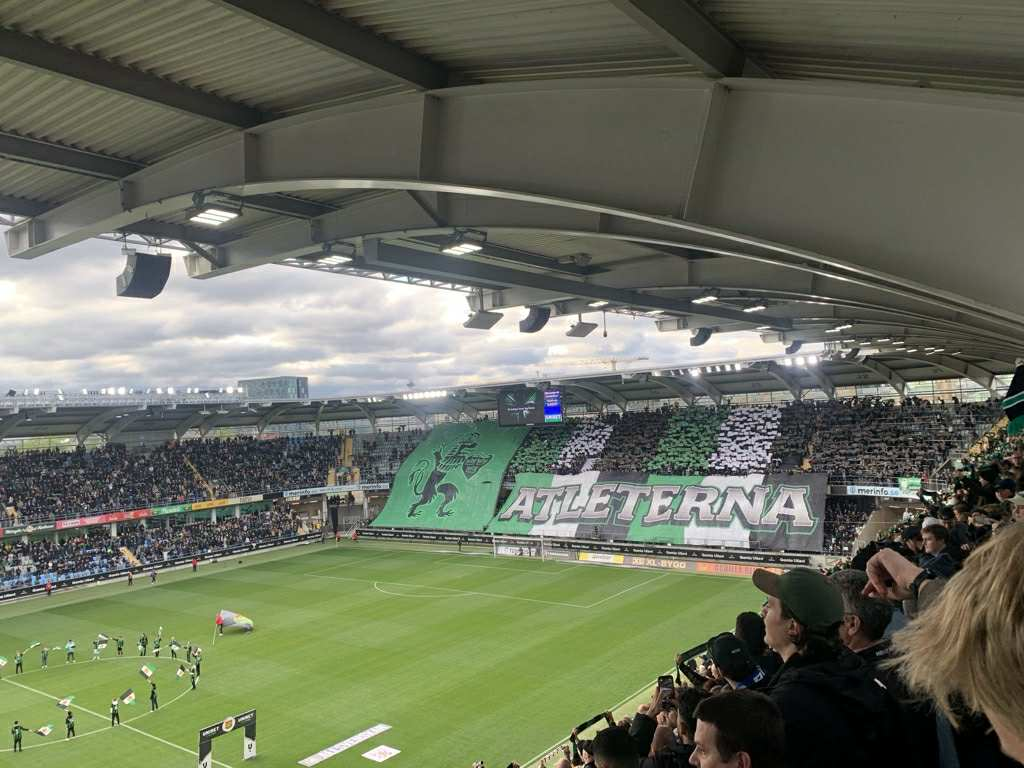
GAIS fans tifo against IFK Göteborg in 2024

There is also a historical but less intense rivalry with Örgryte IS, rooted in class distinctions—GAIS representing working-class traditions, while Örgryte is seen as more upper-class. Though emotions exist, this fixture generally doesn't spark as much passion as the GAIS–IFK derby

Additionally, BK Häcken, a club from the Hisingen district, hasn't historically been a major rival, but recent successes in top-tier Swedish football have elevated the competitive spirit between the two teams supporters.

On the ultras and fan culture side, GAIS is associated with the active and sometimes confrontational group known as GAIS Tifo or GAIS Tifo (2006). In the 2000s, there has been a friendship with ultras from BFC Dynamo.

== Players ==
=== First-team squad ===
As of 3 September 2026

Note: Flags indicate national team as defined under FIFA eligibility rules; some limited exceptions apply. Players may hold more than one non-FIFA nationality.

No.	Pos.	Nation	Player
1	GK	SWE	Mergim Krasniqi
2	DF	CAN	Matteo de Brienne
4	DF	SWE	Oskar Ågren
5	DF	SWE	Robin Wendin Thomasson
6	DF	SWE	August Wängberg (captain)
7	MF	SWE	Joackim Fagerjord
8	MF	SWE	William Milovanovic
9	MF	SWE	Gustav Lundgren
10	MF	SWE	Henry Sletsjøe
11	FW	SWE	Rasmus Niklasson Petrovic
12	DF	SWE	Robin Frej
14	MF	DEN	Simon Girke Jørgensen
16	MF	SWE	Max Andersson
17	MF	ISL	Róbert Frosti Þorkelsson

No.	Pos.	Nation	Player
18	MF	SWE	Kevin Holmén
19	MF	SWE	Christos Gravius
20	FW	CAN	Samuel Salter
21	FW	SWE	Nikola Vasić
22	DF	BIH	Anes Čardaklija
24	DF	SWE	Filip Beckman
25	MF	SWE	Jonas Lindberg
26	FW	GHA	Blessing Asumang
27	MF	LBY	Mohamed Bawa
28	FW	SWE	Lucas Hedlund
32	FW	SWE	Oscar Pettersson
33	GK	DEN	Andreas Hermansen
34	MF	SWE	Dennis Collander

=== Out on loan ===
Note: Flags indicate national team as defined under FIFA eligibility rules; some limited exceptions apply. Players may hold more than one non-FIFA nationality.

No.	Pos.	Nation	Player
13	GK	NZL	Kees Sims (at Haugesund until 31 December 2026)
14	MF	SWE	Filip Gustafsson (at Norrby IF until 30 November 2026)
19	FW	CIV	Ibrahim Diabate (at Erzurumspor until 30 June 2027)
21	FW	SWE	Shalom Ekong (at GIF Sundsvall until 30 November 2026)

No.	Pos.	Nation	Player
29	FW	SWE	Daniel Bengtsson (at Utsiktens BK until 30 November 2026)
30	GK	SWE	Alvin Didriksson (at Hestrafors IF until 30 November 2026)
31	FW	SWE	Simon Sjöholm (at Utsiktens BK until 30 November 2026)
35	MF	SWE	Elias Younan (at Skövde AIK until 30 November 2026)

=== Retired numbers ===
15 – Fredrik Lundgren, defender and midfielder (1999–2002, 2003–2012)

=== Notable players ===
Karl-Alfred Jacobsson has been selected as both player of the century" and player of the millennium by GAIS fans. The GAIS player of the year award "The Honorary Mackerel" has presented by the supporter group Makrillarna at the end of each season since 1961. The following players have received the award, played over a hundred matches for the club, made international appearances or had significant role.

:[11][12]

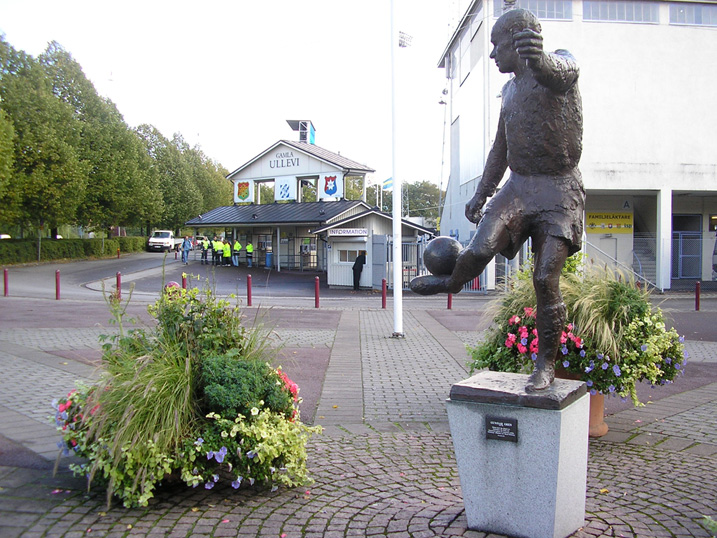
Gunnar Gren won the award as player manager in 1963 after helping the club advance to Allsvenskan. His statue currently stands outside of the Gamla Ullevi stadium.

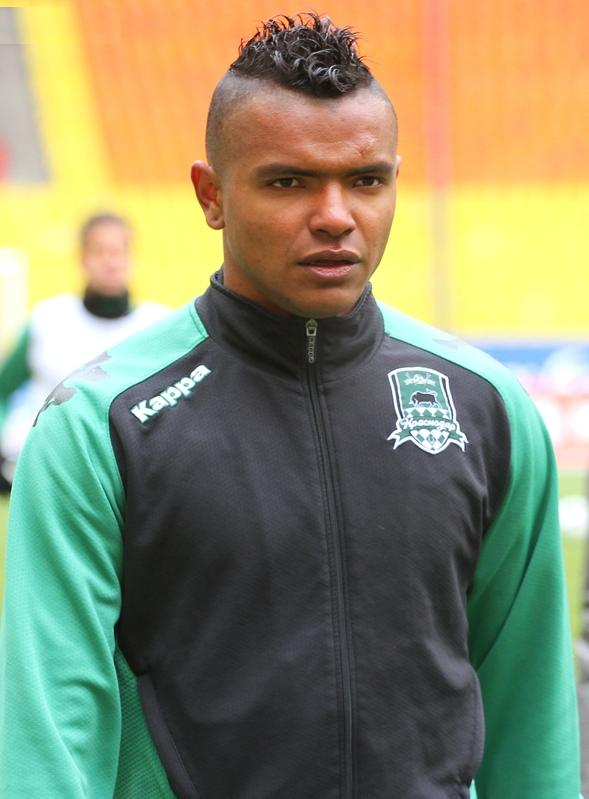
Wánderson became the tied top goalscorer of the 2012–13 Russian Premier League after leaving GAIS.

- (Sweden) Frank Jacobsson
- (Sweden) Leif Andersson
- (Sweden) Bo Palle
- (Sweden) Gunnar Gren
- (Sweden) Leif Forsberg
- (Sweden) Leif Wendt
- (Sweden) Kurt Axelsson
- (Sweden) Kent Grek
- (Sweden) Jan Olsson
- (Sweden) Hasse Samuelsson
- (Sweden) Hasse Johansson
- (Sweden) Sten Pålsson
- (Sweden) Kjell Uppling
- (Sweden) Eine Fredriksson
- (Sweden) Sune Persson
- (Sweden) Nils Norlander
- (Sweden) Mikael Johansson
- (Sweden) Mikael Berthagen
- (Sweden) Morgan Lagemyr
- (Sweden) Osborn Larsson
- (Sweden) Lallo Fernandez
- (Sweden) Håkan Lindman
- (Sweden) Niklas Sjöstedt
- (Tunisia) Samir Bakaou
- (Sweden) Sören Järelöv
- (Sweden) Ulf Johansson
- (England) Steve Gardner
- (Sweden) Tony Persson
- (Sweden) Jens Wålemark
- (Sweden) Lenna Kreivi
- (Finland) Erik Holmgren
- (Sweden) Tinos Lappas
- (Sweden) Thomas Hallberg
- (Sweden) Stefan Martinsen
- (Sweden) Niclas Johansson
- (Sweden) Mårten Jonsson
- (Sweden) Per Johansson
- (Sweden) Magnus Gustafsson
- (Sweden) Thomas Hvenfelt
- (Sweden) Anders Holmberg
- (Sweden) Ivan Ottordahl
- (Sweden) Mathias Gravem
- (Finland) Ville Viljanen
- (Sweden) Stefan Vennberg
- (Sweden) Fredrik Lundgren
- (Sweden) Dime Jankulovski
- (Democratic Republic of the Congo) Richard Ekunde
- (Sweden) Bobbie Friberg da Cruz
- (Brazil) Wánderson
- (Sweden) Kenneth Gustafsson
- (Cameroon) Eric Bassombeng
- (Sweden) Lars Göthfelt
- (Sweden) Joel Anell
- (Sweden) Mervan Çelik
- (Ivory Coast) Ibrahim Diabate
- (Sweden) Amin Boudri
- (Sweden) Gustav Lundgren
- (Sweden) August Wängberg
- (Costa Rica) Ariel Lassiter
- (Sweden) Joackim Fagerjord
- (Sweden) Jonas Lindberg
- (Sweden) Mergim Krasniqi
- (South Africa) Luther Singh
- (Ghana) Reuben Ayarna
- (Nigeria) Prince Ikpe Ekong
- (Nigeria) Prince Efe Ehiorobo
- (Sweden) Axel Henriksson
- (Sweden) Harun Ibrahim

== Managers ==
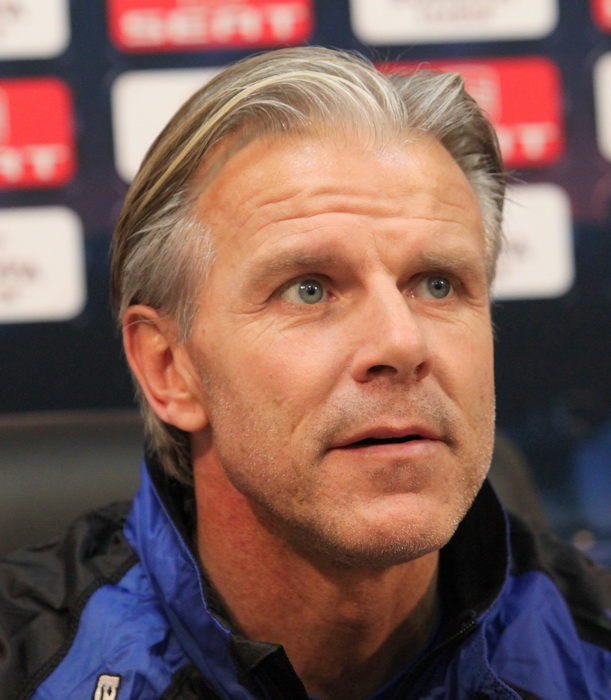
1994 FIFA World Cup bronze medalist Roland Nilsson is the manager who most recently brought the club back up into Allsvenskan.

- (Sweden) Knut Holmberg (1938–42)
- (Sweden) Gösta Holmberg (1940–41)
- (Sweden) Helge Liljebjörn (1941–43)
- (Sweden) Holger Johansson (1943–49)
- (England) George Raynor (1947–48)
- (Austria) Willy Wolf (1949–51)
- (Sweden) Helge Ahlström (1951–52)
- (Sweden) Sven Jacobsson (1952–54)
- (Sweden) Gösta Hallberg (1954–56)
- (Sweden) Sixten Rosenqvist (1955–57)
- (Sweden) Karl-Erik Grahn (1956–59)
- (Sweden) Curt Thorstensson (1960–61)
- (Hungary) István Takács (1962)
- (Sweden) Gunnar Gren (1963–64)
- (Sweden) Holger Hansson (1965–67)
- (Sweden) Gunnar Gren (1968–69)
- (Sweden) Holger Hansson (1970–72)
- (Hungary) Vilmos Várszegi (1973–76)
- (Sweden) Rune Jingård (1976)
- (Sweden) Arne Lindqvist (1977)
- (Sweden) Lars Hedén (1978–79)
- (Norway) Tom Lilledal (1980)
- (Sweden) Bosse Nilsson (1981)
- (Sweden) Bo Falk (1982–92)
- (Sweden) Bengt-Arne Strömberg (1993–96)
- (Sweden) Hans Gren (1997–98)
- (Sweden) Lennart Ottordal (1999–00)
- (Sweden) Kent Kierdorf (2001)
- (Sweden) Lennart Ottordal (2001–02)
- (Sweden) Roberto Jacobsson (2003)
- (Sweden) Roland Nilsson (2004–07)
- (Sweden) Magnus Pehrsson (2008)
- (Sweden) Alexander Axén (2009 – Jul 2012)
- (Netherlands) Jan Mak (Aug–Oct 2012)
- (Sweden) Benjamin Westman (Oct–Dec 2012)
- (Sweden) Thomas Askebrand (2013–2014)
- (Sweden) Per-Ola Ljung (2014 – Aug 2015)
- (Sweden) Jesper Ljung (Aug–Dec 2015)
- (Sweden) Benjamin Westman (2016–2017)
- (Sweden) Patrik Ingelsten (Jun–Jul 2017)
- (Sweden) Bosko Orovic (2017 – Jul 2019)
- (Sweden) Patrik Ingelsten (Jul–Sep 2019)
- (Sweden) Tomas Erixon (Sep–Dec 2019)
- (Sweden) Stefan Jacobsson (Dec 2019 – Nov 2021)
- (Sweden) Fredrik Holmberg (Nov 2021–)

== Achievements ==
=== Domestic ===
- Swedish Champions (Note: The title of "Swedish Champions" has been awarded to the winner of four different competitions over the years. Between 1896 and 1925 the title was awarded to the winner of Svenska Mästerskapet, a stand-alone cup tournament. No club were given the title between 1926 and 1930 even though the first-tier league Allsvenskan was played. In 1931 the title was reinstated and awarded to the winner of Allsvenskan. Between 1982 and 1990 a play-off in cup format was held at the end of the league season to decide the champions. After the play-off format in 1991 and 1992 the title was decided by the winner of Mästerskapsserien, an additional league after the end of Allsvenskan. Since the 1993 season the title has once again been awarded to the winner of Allsvenskan.)
  - Winners (4): 1919, 1922, 1930–31, 1953–54

=== League ===
- Allsvenskan:
  - Winners (4): 1924–25, 1926–27, 1930–31, 1953–54
  - Runners-up (4): 1925–26, 1932–33, 1933–34, 1941–42
- Superettan:
  - Runner-up (1): 2023
- Division 1 Södra:
  - Winners (1): 1987, 2022
  - Runners-up (2): 1995, 1999
- Svenska Serien:
  - Winners (1): 1923–24

=== Cups ===
- Svenska Cupen:
  - Winners (1): 1942
  - Runners-up (1): 1986–87
- Svenska Mästerskapet:
  - Winners (2): 1919, 1922

=== European ===
- Intertoto Cup:
  - Winners (1): 1990
