= List of Malmö FF players (1–24 appearances) =

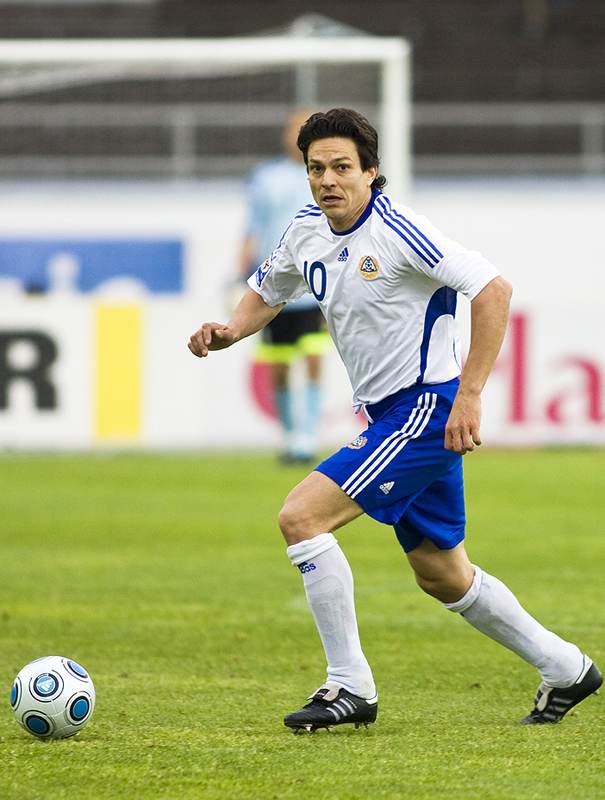
Jari Litmanen made ten appearances and scored three goals for Malmö FF between 2005 and 2007.

Malmö Fotbollförening, also known simply as Malmö FF, is a Swedish professional association football club based in Malmö. The club is affiliated with Skånes Fotbollförbund (The Scanian Football Association), and plays its home games at Stadion. Formed on 24 February 1910, Malmö FF is the most successful club in Sweden in terms of trophies won. The club have won the most league titles of any Swedish club with twenty-one, a joint record eighteen Swedish championship titles and a record fourteen national cup titles. (Note: The title of "Swedish Champions" has been awarded to the winner of four different competitions over the years. Between 1896 and 1925 the title was awarded to the winner of Svenska Mästerskapet, a stand-alone cup tournament. No club were given the title between 1926 and 1930 even though the first-tier league Allsvenskan was played. In 1931 the title was reinstated and awarded to the winner of Allsvenskan. Between 1982 and 1990 a play-off in cup format was held at the end of the league season to decide the champions. After the play-off format in 1991 and 1992 the title was decided by the winner of Mästerskapsserien, an additional league after the end of Allsvenskan. Since the 1993 season the title has once again been awarded to the winner of Allsvenskan.) The team competes in Allsvenskan as of the 2015 season; this is Malmö FF's 15th consecutive season in the top flight, and their 80th overall. The main rivals of the club are Helsingborgs IF, IFK Göteborg and, historically, IFK Malmö.

Since Malmö FF's first competitive match, more than 450 players have made a league appearance for the club. Many of these players have spent only a short period of their career at Malmö FF before seeking opportunities in other teams; some players had their careers cut short by injury, while others left for other reasons. Jari Litmanen transferred to the club after having a very successful career in various European clubs, Ajax being the most prominent. However Litmanen's two year Malmö FF career was cut short by persistent injury problems. Igor Sypniewski who transferred to Malmö before the club's 2004 title winning season only played eight matches and scored two goals before leaving the club due to personal problems, which led to the club releasing him due to breach of contract.

As of 31 October 2015, a total of 240 players have played fewer than 25 competitive matches for the club. Of those players, 18 are still playing for the club and can add to their total. Three former players – Per-Åke Åkesson, Jesper Bech and Ove Blomberg – each made 24 appearances during their spell at Malmö FF. Johan Wiland, Felipe Carvalho and Nikola Đurđić are the most recent players to have made their first league appearances for the club.

== Key ==
General

- Appearances and goals are for first-team competitive league matches only, including Allsvenskan, Svenska Serien, Superettan and Division 2 matches. Substitute appearances included.
- Players are listed according to the total number of league games played, the player with the most goals scored is ranked higher if two or more players are tied.
- Positions are listed according to the tactical formations that were employed at the time. Thus the change in the names of defensive and midfield reflects the tactical evolution that occurred from the 1960s onwards. The year 1960 is used as a breaking point in this list for the use of names of defensive and midfield positions.

Table headers

- Nationality – If a player played international football, the country/countries he played for are shown. Otherwise, the player's nationality is given as their country of birth.
- Malmö FF career – The year of the player's first appearance for Malmö FF to the year of his last appearance.
- Appearances – The number of games played.
- Goals – The number of goals scored.

Positions key
Pre-1960		Post-1960	
GK	Goalkeeper		
FB	Full back	DF	Defender
HB	Half back	MF	Midfielder
FW	Forward		
U	Utility player		

Symbols key
Symbol	Meaning
‡	Malmö FF player in the 2015 season
*	Player holds club record(s)

== Players ==
Statistics correct as of match played 19 July 2016. (Note: For up to date statistics and referencing for current Malmö FF players on this list, see the statistics section at svenskfotboll.se: click on the relevant player's name there to verify that the statistics displayed on this list are correct. For players who are no longer part of the squad, but who played in Malmö FF after 2010, see www.soccerway.com, and enter the player's name into the search field in the upper-right-hand corner and press enter to verify the player's statistics.)

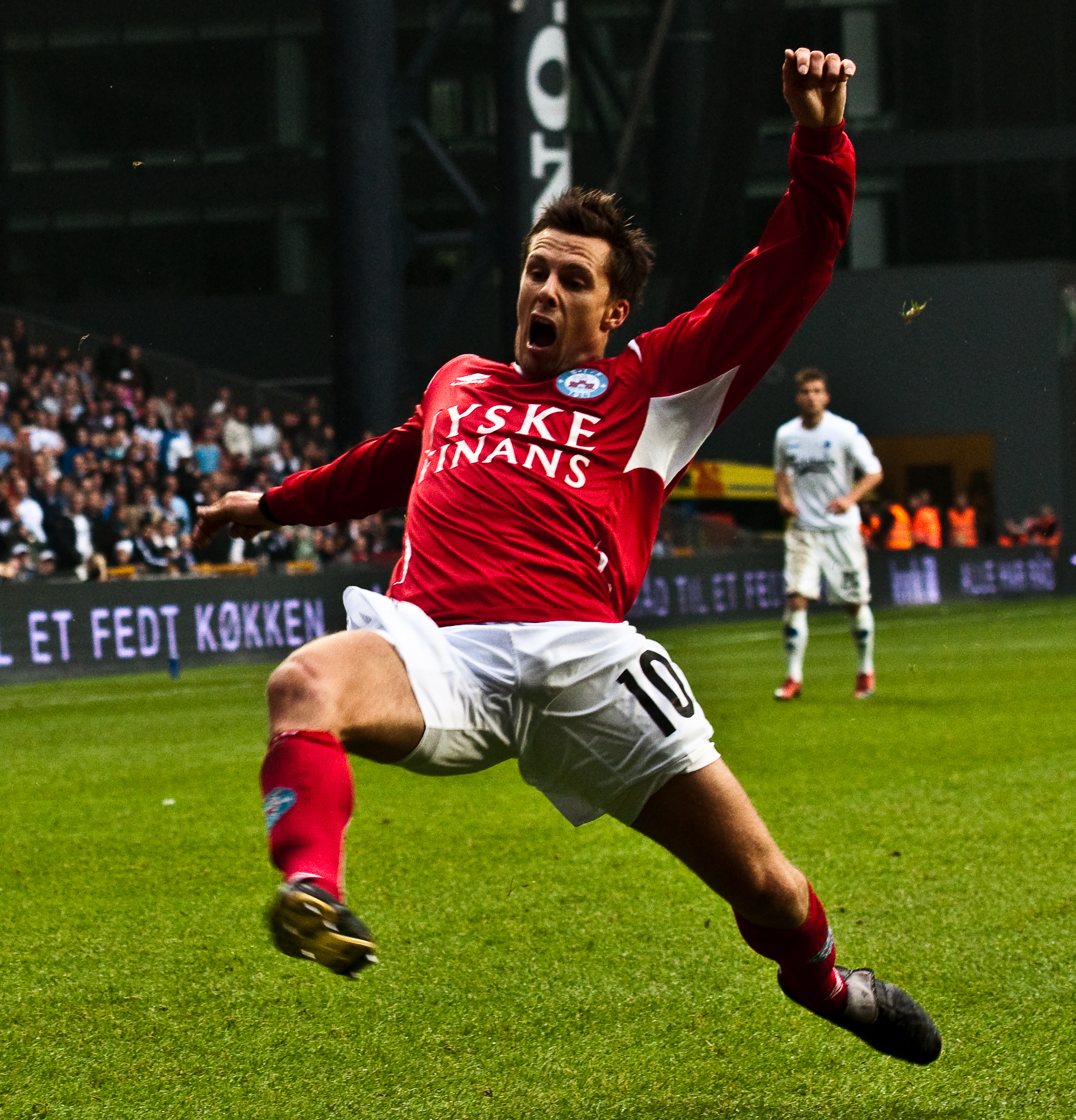
Jesper Bech made 24 appearances and scored one goal for Malmö FF between 2005 and 2006.

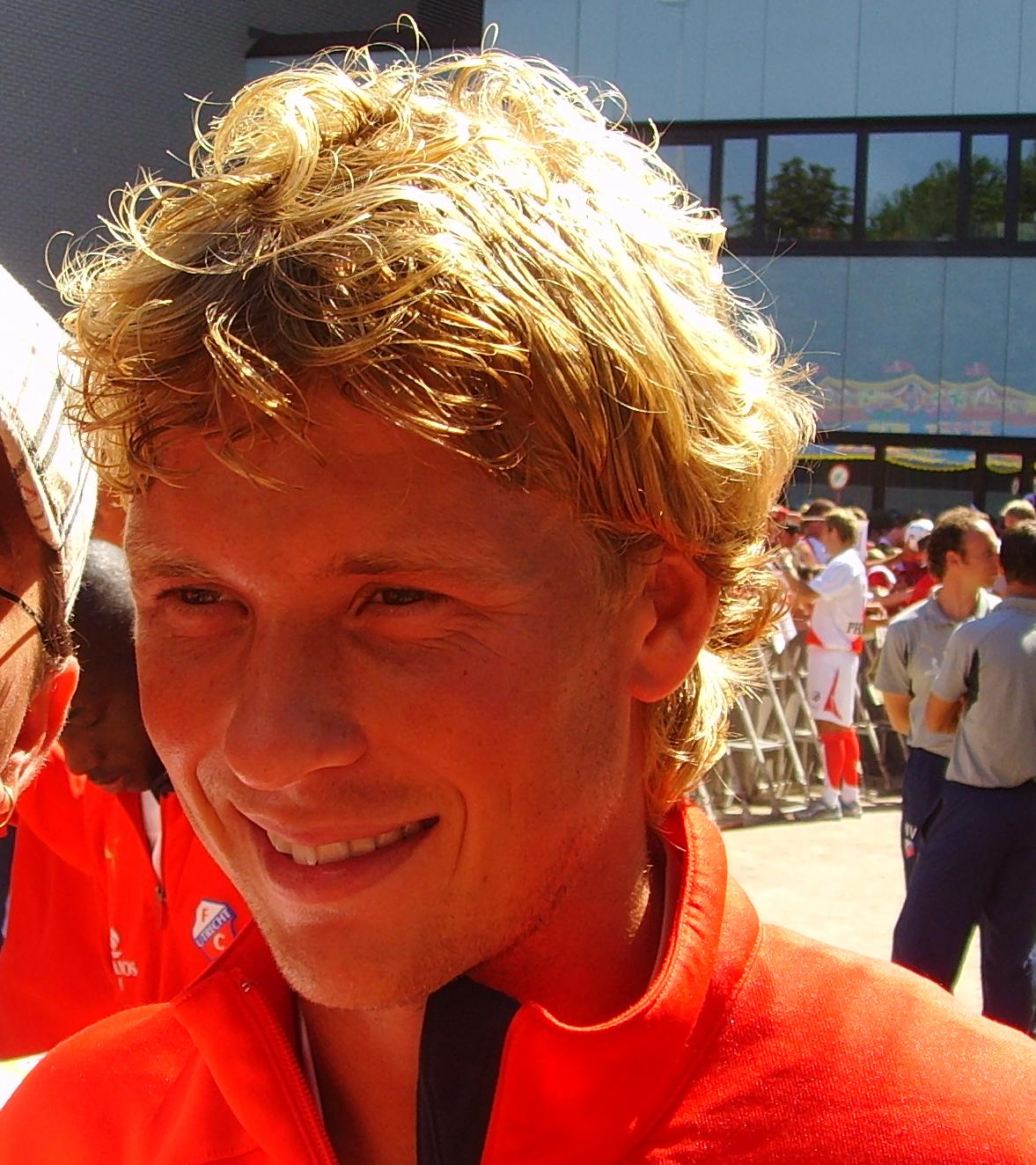
Rick Kruys made 21 appearances for Malmö FF between 2008 and 2012.

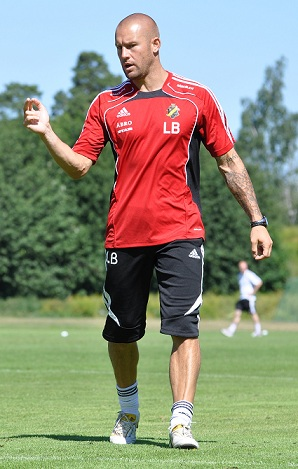
Lee Baxter made 17 appearances for Malmö FF between 2001 and 2003.

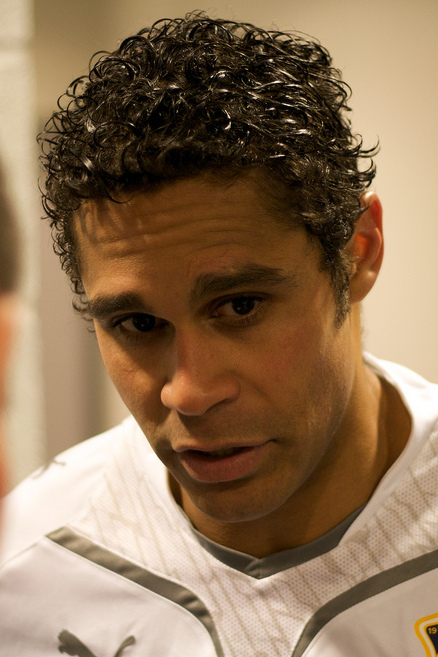
Daniel Nannskog made 10 appearances and scored one goal for Malmö FF in 1996.

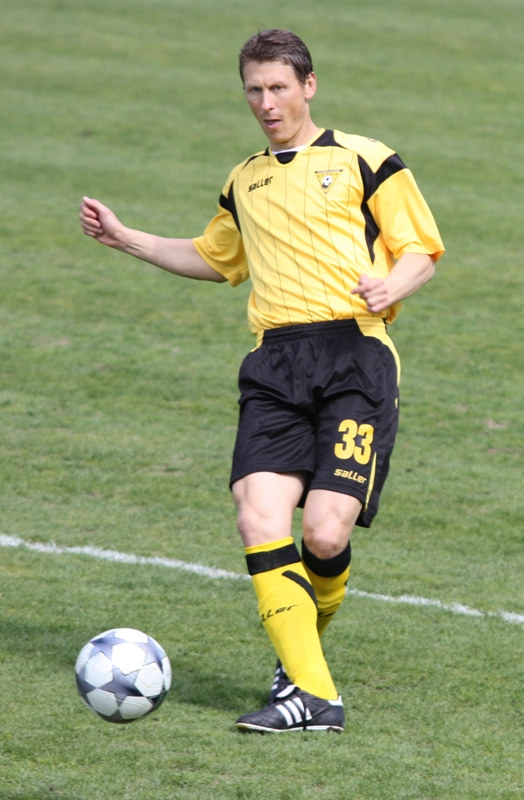
Tomas Ražanauskas made 9 appearances for Malmö FF in 1999.

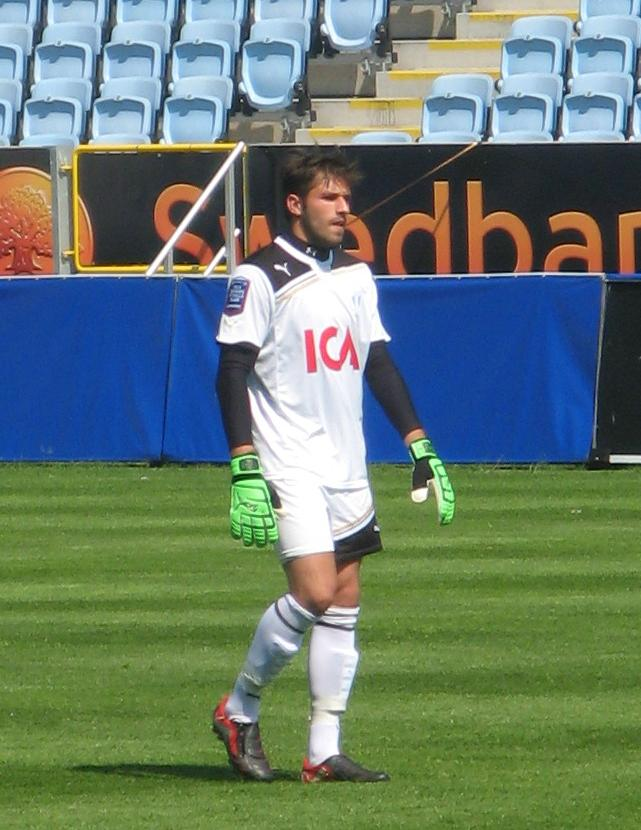
Dejan Garača made 3 appearances for Malmö FF between 2008 and 2011.

List of Malmö FF players with between 1 and 24 league appearances
Name	Nationality	Position	Malmö FF career	Appearances	Goals
Per-Åke Åkesson	Sweden	FW	1974–1977	24	2
Jesper Bech	Denmark	FW	2005–2006	24	1
Ove Blomberg	Sweden	FB	1928–1932	24	0
Nils Nilsson	Sweden	Unknown	1923–1930	23	5
Karl-Erik Nilsson	Sweden	FW	1937–1942	23	4
Ólafur Örn Bjarnason	Iceland	DF	1998–2000	23	2
Einar Mårtensson	Sweden	FW	1945–1952	22	7
Jussi Nuorela	Finland	DF	2002–2003	22	0
Greger Andrijevski	Sweden	FW	1995–1997	21	5
Vladimir Rodić	Montenegro	MF	2015–2016	21	5
Stig Brobeck	Sweden	HB	1937–1940	21	3
Tobias Grahn	Sweden	MF	2003–2004	21	3
Ola Tidman	Sweden	GK	1998–2000	21	0
Rick Kruys	Netherlands	MF	2008–2012	21	0
Viðar Örn Kjartansson	Iceland	FW	2016	20	14
Bent Skammelsrud	Norway	MF	1990	20	2
Carl Andersson	Sweden	Unknown	1920–1923	20	0
Bengt Lindskog	Sweden	MF	1955–1956	19	14
Tore Linnander	Sweden	FW	1930–1935	19	13
Emil Hallfreðsson	Iceland	MF	2006	19	5
Helge Zachrisson	Sweden	FB	1931–1933	19	1
Glenn Holgersson	Sweden	DF	2004–2006	19	1
Martin Nordström	Sweden	Unknown	1924–1929	19	0
Marcus Vaapil	Sweden	MF	1996–2000	19	0
Lennart Hansson	Sweden	MF	1959–1960	18	7
Harry Gullander	Sweden	Unknown	1923–1930	18	4
Roland Rasmusson	Sweden	FW	1969–1972	18	3
Gustav Engvall	Sweden	Unknown	1923–1925	18	0
Gert Persson	Sweden	MF	1955–1958	18	0
Erkka Petäjä	Finland	DF	1992–1993	18	0
Goran Trpevski	Sweden	MF	1997–1999	18	0
Amin Nazari	Sweden	MF	2011–2015	18	0
Arne Hjertsson (Note: Arne Hjertsson holds the club and Allsvenskan records for most goals scored in a game with 7 goals. The record was set in an Allsvenskan match against Halmstads BK on 3 June 1943. The Allsvenskan record is shared with Gunnar Nordahl.) *	Sweden	FW	1936–1944	17	11
Paul McKinnon	Scotland	FW	1980–1981	17	7
Emil Gudmundsson	Sweden	Unknown	1923–1924	17	5
Olle Mårtensson	Sweden	Unknown	1934–1936	17	5
Felipe Carvalho	Uruguay	DF	2015–2017	17	4
Gustav Karlsson	Sweden	Unknown	1924–1927	17	0
Valter Ryberg	Sweden	GK	1930–1932	17	0
Tore Söderholm	Sweden	HB	1953–1955	17	0
Lee Baxter	Sweden	GK	2001–2003	17	0
Börje Nilsson	Sweden	FW	1957–1959	16	8
Alex Lindén	Sweden	HB	1930–1933	16	0
Erik Eckard	Sweden	FB	1931–1932	16	0
Jörgen Lundgren	Sweden	DF	1989–1992	16	0
Hugo Andersson	Sweden	FW	1932–1933	15	7
Gösta Nilsson	Sweden	FW	1920–1925	15	6
Isaac Kiese Thelin	Sweden	FW	2014	14	5
Ulf Sivnert	Sweden	FW	1965–1966	14	2
Kristian Bergström	Sweden	MF	2003	14	1
Sven Winqvist	Sweden	GK	1947–1949	14	0
Milan Simeunović	Yugoslavia	GK	1998–1999	14	0
Johan Andersson	Sweden	Unknown	1920–1926	13	12
Mike Owusu	Ghana	DF	1997–1998	13	1
Robin Nilsson	Sweden	MF	2006–2010	13	0
Elvir Svensson	Sweden	Unknown	1923–1927	12	6
Nikola Đurđić	Serbia	FW	2015	12	5
Jan Bengtsson	Sweden	FW	1966	12	4
Ramon Filippini	Sweden	FW	1950–1951	12	3
Kenneth Gustafsson	Sweden	DF	2000–2002	12	2
Knut Fagerström	Sweden	Unknown	1923–1925	12	1
Jan Jeppsson	Sweden	FW	1962–1963	12	1
Jan-Åke Svensson	Sweden	FW	1970–1973	12	0
Nils Andersson	Sweden	FW	1951–1955	11	5
Kjell-Åke Nilsson	Sweden	FW	1962–1963	11	3
Knut Andersson	Sweden	Unknown	1940–1943	11	2
Björn Reinholdsson	Sweden	FW	1972–1973	11	1
Johan Sjöberg	Sweden	Unknown	1920–1921	11	0
Jörgen Engqvist	Sweden	HB	1951–1954	11	0
Sten Stjernqvist	Sweden	FW	1973–1974	11	0
Mike Jensen	Denmark	MF	2008	11	0
Lars Öhrn	Sweden	Unknown	1924–1926	10	9
Jari Litmanen	Finland	FW	2005–2006	10	3
Gösta Friberg	Sweden	Unknown	1939–1940	10	2
Daniel Nannskog	Sweden	FW	1996	10	1
Georg Nilsson	Sweden	Unknown	1939–1941	10	0
Bror Eliasson	Sweden	HB	1939–1946	10	0
Bror Pettersson	Sweden	GK	1950–1951	10	0
Bernard Beuken	Belgium	DF	1996	10	0
Babis Stefanidis	Sweden	MF	2007–2009	10	0
Olof Rindahl	Sweden	Unknown	1920–1921	9	5
Bertil Nord	Sweden	GK	1961–1963	9	1
Otto Bengtsson	Sweden	Unknown	1924–1928	9	0
Erik Åkesson	Sweden	Unknown	1928–1929	9	0
Bertil Winqvist	Sweden	Unknown	1946–1947	9	0
Carsten Olausson	Sweden	GK	1993–1994	9	0
Tomas Ražanauskas	Lithuania	MF	1999	9	0
Igor Sypniewski	Poland	FW	2004	8	2
August Andersson	Sweden	Unknown	1923–1927	8	1
Bengt Berg	Sweden	FW	1960–1961	8	1
Yngve Rosqvist	Sweden	Unknown	1936–1939	8	0
Jan Inge Andersson	Sweden	Unknown	1960	8	0
Robert Kjellin	Sweden	DF	2001	8	0
Johan Hammar	Sweden	DF	2013–2015	8	0
Johan Sand	Sweden	Unknown	1934–1935	7	4
Gunnar Wictorin	Sweden	Unknown	1924–1926	7	2
Ingemar Thillberg	Sweden	Unknown	1951–1952	7	2
Henry Rosengren	Sweden	GK	1932–1933	7	0
Gert Nilsson	Sweden	FW	1953–1955	7	0
Kent Andersson	Sweden	FW	1969	7	0
Tony Flygare	Sweden	FW	1999	7	0
Lars Tengberg	Sweden	MF	1960	6	1
Raoul Kouakou	Côte d'Ivoire	DF	2005–2006	6	1
Otto Nyberg	Sweden	Unknown	1920–1926	6	0
Göte Lilja	Sweden	Unknown	1924–1925	6	0
Karl Persson	Sweden	Unknown	1928–1929	6	0
Viking Stjärnfeldt	Sweden	HB	1931–1936	6	0
Sven Dyberg	Sweden	MF	1961–1963	6	0
Richard Oteng Mensah	Ghana	MF	2000–2001	6	0
Johan Nilsson-Guiomar	Sweden	DF	2003–2006	6	0
Rawez Lawan	Sweden	FW	2005–2006	6	0
Tobias Malm	Sweden	DF	2011–2014	6	0
Bo-Göran Ohlsson	Sweden	Unknown	1966	5	2
Allan Jönsson	Sweden	Unknown	1938–1939	5	1
Lennart Mårtensson	Sweden	Unknown	1941–1942	5	1
John Allen	Wales	MF	1989	5	1
Gustav Lindeblad	Sweden	Unknown	1922–1923	5	0
Thorsten Andersson	Sweden	Unknown	1924–1927	5	0
Einar Larsson	Sweden	Unknown	1925–1927	5	0
Torsten Brost	Sweden	HB	1932–1933	5	0
Lennart Gustafsson	Sweden	GK	1955–1957	5	0
Jan Ericsson	Sweden	Unknown	1963	5	0
Robert Kertes	Sweden	FW	1984–1985	5	0
Jeppe Vestergaard	Denmark	DF	2002–2003	5	0
Anes Mravac	Sweden	DF	2006–2010	5	0
Johan Andersson	Sweden	MF	2007	5	0
Zlatan Azinović	Sweden	GK	2012; 2014–2016	5	0
Piotr Johansson	Sweden	MF	2014–2017	5	0
Lars Johansson	Sweden	Unknown	1939–1940	4	2
Kjell Tengvall	Sweden	FW	1951–1954	4	2
Hilder Svensson	Sweden	Unknown	1922–1923	4	1
Einar Kruse	Sweden	Unknown	1929–1933	4	1
Bertil Larsson	Sweden	Unknown	1945–1954	4	1
Sanny Åslund	Sweden	FW	1979–1980	4	1
Knut Andersson	Sweden	Unknown	1939–1940	4	0
Lars Kvist	Sweden	FW	1963	4	0
Mats Strandberg	Sweden	GK	1984	4	0
Per Olsson	Sweden	FW	1985	4	0
Roger Svensson	Sweden	GK	1990	4	0
Billy Berntsson	Sweden	DF	2002	4	0
Darko Lukanović	Sweden	FW	2004	4	0
Samuel Barlay	Sierra Leone	MF	2004–2007	4	0
Filip Stenström	Sweden	DF	2009–2013	4	0
Omid Nazari	Sweden	MF	2011	4	0
David Löfquist	Sweden	MF	2012	4	0
Petar Petrović	Sweden	MF	2013–2015	4	0
Göte Jönsson	Sweden	Unknown	1935–1936	3	4
Karl Karlsson	Sweden	Unknown	1927–1930	3	1
Folke Nilsson	Sweden	Unknown	1946–1951	3	1
Bengt Andersson	Sweden	FW	1959–1960	3	1
Adolf Florin	Sweden	Unknown	1924–1925	3	0
Eric Nilsson	Sweden	Unknown	1924–1925	3	0
Erik Wärn	Sweden	Unknown	1927–1937	3	0
Sture Håkansson	Sweden	Unknown	1928–1929	3	0
Stig Nilsson	Sweden	FW	1950–1951	3	0
Stig Bornhager	Sweden	FW	1956–1958	3	0
Christer Persson	Sweden	FW	1963	3	0
Christer Rosberg	Sweden	FW	1963	3	0
Lars Alfelt	Sweden	GK	1966	3	0
Leif Andersson	Sweden	FW	1970	3	0
Hans Johansson	Sweden	FW	1988	3	0
Ante Šimundža	Slovenia	FW	1998	3	0
Gezim Osmani	Sweden	MF	2000	3	0
Marcus Winqvist	Sweden	MF	2001	3	0
Dejan Garača	Sweden	GK	2008–2011	3	0
Bert Frithiof	Sweden	FW	1954–1955	2	1
Magnus Eriksson	Sweden	FW	1996	2	1
Algot Johansson	Sweden	Unknown	1923–1924	2	0
Thore Andersson	Sweden	Unknown	1926–1927	2	0
Alrik Andersson	Sweden	Unknown	1929–1930	2	0
Kjell Karlsson	Sweden	Unknown	1939–1940	2	0
Lennart Holmberg	Sweden	FW	1947–1951	2	0
Kjell Mårtensson	Sweden	Unknown	1955–1957	2	0
Lennart Larsson	Sweden	Unknown	1961	2	0
Sven Rosén	Sweden	Unknown	1966	2	0
Leif Rudevi	Sweden	FW	1966	2	0
Gert-Inge Sigfridsson	Sweden	Unknown	1971	2	0
Arne Åkesson	Sweden	GK	1977	2	0
Ulf Mårtensson	Sweden	FW	1979	2	0
Anders Lewicki	Sweden	FW	1987	2	0
Jörgen Persson	Sweden	FW	1989	2	0
Rasmus Svensson	Sweden	DF	1991	2	0
Mikael Andersson	Sweden	MF	1996–1997	2	0
Johan Laursen	Sweden	MF	2000	2	0
Muamet Asanovski	Sweden	MF	2009–2010	2	0
Benjamin Fadi	Ghana	FW	2013–2016	2	0
Kjell Persson	Sweden	FW	1949–1950	1	2
Inge Blomberg	Sweden	FW	1950–1951	1	2
Per Harrysson	Sweden	FW	1987	1	1
Harald Olsson	Sweden	Unknown	1920–1921	1	0
Helge Burén	Sweden	Unknown	1920–1921	1	0
August Johansson	Sweden	Unknown	1922–1923	1	0
Wincent Gullander	Sweden	Unknown	1923–1924	1	0
John Rosenblad	Sweden	Unknown	1928–1929	1	0
Helge Andersson	Sweden	Unknown	1929–1930	1	0
Harald Andersson	Sweden	Unknown	1929–1930	1	0
Sture Stjärnfeldt	Sweden	Unknown	1935–1936	1	0
Tore Sandell	Sweden	Unknown	1941–1942	1	0
Erik Svensson	Sweden	Unknown	1943–1944	1	0
Bernt Theorin	Sweden	Unknown	1947–1948	1	0
Allan Karlsson	Sweden	FW	1952–1953	1	0
Lars Persson	Sweden	Unknown	1953–1954	1	0
Kjell Nilsson	Sweden	Unknown	1957–1958	1	0
Jörgen Martinsson	Sweden	Unknown	1966	1	0
Leif Sörensson	Sweden	Unknown	1966	1	0
Jan Sjögren	Sweden	FW	1978	1	0
Denny Petrusson	Sweden	DF	1979	1	0
Anders Grimberg	Sweden	FW	1980	1	0
Jan Odelstig	Sweden	GK	1980	1	0
Jonas Holm	Sweden	Unknown	1981	1	0
Thomas Hansmark	Sweden	MF	1984	1	0
Ulf Johansson	Sweden	Unknown	1986	1	0
Anders Jönsson	Sweden	GK	1988	1	0
Lennart Fridh	Sweden	MF	1989	1	0
Carl Shutt	England	FW	1990	1	0
Thomas Johansson	Sweden	Unknown	1991	1	0
Erol Bekirovski	Sweden	MF	1994	1	0
Björn Stringheim	Sweden	GK	1994	1	0
Mattias Waldh	Sweden	FW	1998	1	0
Christian Bank	Denmark	DF	1999	1	0
Martin Larsson	Sweden	DF	1999	1	0
Thommie Persson	Sweden	DF	2003	1	0
Daniel Sliper	Sweden	MF	2005–2008	1	0
Håkan Svensson	Sweden	GK	2006	1	0
Daniel Theorin	Sweden	DF	2007	1	0
David Durmaz	Sweden	DF	2009	1	0
Tobias Lewicki	Sweden	MF	2012	1	0
Alexander Blomqvist	Sweden	DF	2013–2015	1	0
Mahmut Özen	Turkey	DF	2014–2015	1	0
