= 2000 Malmö FF season =

Malmö FF
2000 season
- Chairman: (Sweden) Bengt Madsen
- Manager: (Sweden) Michael Andersson
- Stadium: Malmö Stadion
- Superettan: 2nd
- Svenska Cupen: Round 2
- Top goalscorer: Zlatan Ibrahimović (12)
Home colours	Away colours

Malmö FF competed in Superettan and Svenska Cupen for the 2000 season. The club was promoted to Allsvenskan.

== Players ==
=== Squad stats ===
No.	Pos	Nat	Player	Total		Superettan	
No.	Pos	Nat	Player	Apps	Goals	Apps	Goals
	DF	(Sweden) SWE	Olof Persson	30	4	30	4
	FW	(Sweden) SWE	Mats Lilienberg	30	7	30	7
	MF	(Sweden) SWE	Hasse Mattisson	29	5	29	5
	FW	(Sweden) SWE	Niclas Kindvall	28	8	28	8
	DF	(Sweden) SWE	Mikael Roth	26	0	26	0
	FW	(Sweden) SWE	Zlatan Ibrahimović	26	12	26	12
	GK	(Sweden) SWE	Jonnie Fedel	25	0	25	0
	DF	(Sweden) SWE	Jimmy Tamandi	23	1	23	1
	DF	(Sweden) SWE	Jonas Wirmola	21	0	21	0
	MF	(Sweden) SWE	Jens Fjellström	21	0	21	0
	DF	(Iceland) ISL	Gudmundur Mete	20	0	20	0
	FW	(Sweden) SWE	Niklas Gudmundsson	20	5	20	5
	DF	(Sweden) SWE	Matias Concha	19	0	19	0
	MF	(Denmark) DEN	Peter Sörensen	19	2	19	2
	DF	(Sweden) SWE	Jörgen Ohlsson	17	1	17	1
	MF	(Sweden) SWE	Brune Tavell	11	0	11	0
	DF	(Sweden) SWE	Jens Nordström	10	1	10	1
	DF	(Cameroon) CMR	Joseph Elanga	9	1	9	1
	GK	(Sweden) SWE	Ola Tidman	6	0	6	0
	MF	(Sweden) SWE	Richard Oteng Mensah	3	0	3	0
	MF	(Sweden) SWE	Kenneth Gustavsson	3	0	3	0
		(Sweden) SWE	Gezim Osmani	3	0	3	0
	MF	(Denmark) DEN	Johan Laursen	2	0	2	0
	DF	(Sweden) SWE	Marcus Vaapil	2	0	2	0

== Competitions ==
=== Superettan ===
==== League table ====
Pos	Team	Pld	W	D	L	GF	GA	GD	Pts	Promotion, qualification or relegation
1	Djurgårdens IF (C, P)	30	20	3	7	68	32	+36	63	Promotion to Allsvenskan
2	Malmö FF (P)	30	18	6	6	47	33	+14	60	Promotion to Allsvenskan
3	Mjällby AIF	30	15	8	7	56	31	+25	53	Qualification to Promotion playoffs
4	Landskrona BoIS	30	16	4	10	59	37	+22	52	
5	Västerås SK	30	14	9	7	50	39	+11	51	

Rules for classification: 1) points; 2) goal difference; 3) number of goals scored.
(C) Champions; (P) Promoted

==== Matches ====
16 April 2000 Round 1	Gunnilse IS	0 – 0	Malmö FF	Gothenburg
				Stadium: Hjällbovallen

24 April 2000 Round 2	Malmö FF	2 – 2	Mjällby AIF	Malmö
	Gudmundsson 12'; Kindvall 83'		Ringberg 45'; Isberg 82'	Stadium: Malmö Stadion

28 April 2000 Round 3	Västerås SK	2 – 3	Malmö FF	Västerås
	Markstedt 48'; Ndugwa 76'		Gudmundsson 8'; Lilienberg 13'; Ibrahimović 51'	Stadium: Arosvallen

7 May 2000 Round 4	Malmö FF	1 – 1	IF Sylvia	Malmö
	Lilienberg 35'		Moberg 86'	Stadium: Malmö Stadion

14 May 2000 Round 5	Landskrona BoIS	2 – 3	Malmö FF	Landskrona
	Cetinkaya 53'; M. Karlsson 90'		Kindvall 27'; Lilienberg 41'; Mattisson 49' (pen.)	Stadium: Landskrona IP

18 May 2000 Round 6	Malmö FF	0 – 2	Djurgårdens IF	Malmö
			Gallo 16'; Wowoah 28'	Stadium: Malmö Stadion

21 May 2000 Round 7	Kalmar FF	0 – 2	Malmö FF	Kalmar
			Kindvall 44'; Persson 66'	Stadium: Fredriksskans

29 May 2000 Round 8	Malmö FF	1 – 0	Umeå FC	Malmö
	Ibrahimović 25'			Stadium: Malmö Stadion

4 June 2000 Round 9	Malmö FF	1 – 0	Enköpings SK	Malmö
	Gudmundsson 9'			Stadium: Malmö Stadion

7 June 2000 Round 10	Ljungskile SK	0 – 1	Malmö FF	Ljungskile
			Ibrahimović 40'	Stadium: Skarsjövallen

12 June 2000 Round 11	Assyriska FF	0 – 1	Malmö FF	Södertälje
			Sørensen 30'	Stadium: Bårsta IP

18 June 2000 Round 12	Malmö FF	1 – 0	Åtvidabergs FF	Malmö
	Ibrahimović 33'			Stadium: Malmö Stadion

26 June 2000 Round 13	Malmö FF	4 – 2	IK Brage	Malmö
	Lilienberg 16'; Mattisson 31'; Nordström 50'; Persson 71'		Bergström 39'; Norell 90'	Stadium: Malmö Stadion

1 July 2000 Round 14	FC Café Opera	1 – 3	Malmö FF	Stockholm
	Marklund 20'		Mattisson 9'; Ibrahimović 61'; Lilienberg 72'	Stadium: Stockholms Stadion

17 July 2000 Round 15	Malmö FF	3 – 1	Östers IF	Malmö
	Tamandi 12'; Lilienberg 23'; Kindvall 59'		Šušak 45'	Stadium: Malmö Stadion

24 July 2000 Round 16	Östers IF	2 – 0	Malmö FF	Växjö
	M. Johansson 68' (pen.) own goal 81'			Stadium: Värendsvallen

3 August 2000 Round 17	Mjällby AIF	2 – 1	Malmö FF	Hällevik
	Isberg 42, 73'		Kindvall 15'	Stadium: Strandvallen

6 August 2000 Round 18	Malmö FF	2 – 0	Gunnilse IS	Malmö
	Mattisson 9'; Ohlsson 60'			Stadium: Malmö Stadion

14 August 2000 Round 19	Malmö FF	3 – 2	Västerås SK	Malmö
	Ibrahimović 10, 88'; Persson 36'		E. Karlsson 16'; P. Larsson 37'	Stadium: Malmö Stadion

18 August 2000 Round 20	IF Sylvia	0 – 0	Malmö FF	Norrköping
				Stadium: Bollspelaren

28 August 2000 Round 21	Malmö FF	0 – 1	Landskrona BoIS	Malmö
			Milovanović 9'	Stadium: Malmö Stadion

4 September 2000 Round 22	Djurgårdens IF	6 – 1	Malmö FF	Stockholm
	Bärlin 9'; A. Johansson 23'; Wowoah 38, 64'; Rehn 48'; Dorsin 61'		own goal 87'	Stadium: Stockholms Stadion

10 September 2000 Round 23	Malmö FF	1 – 0	Kalmar FF	Malmö
	Gudmundsson 52'			Stadium: Malmö Stadion

14 September 2000 Round 24	Umeå FC	1 – 0	Malmö FF	Umeå
	B. Nilsson 69'			Stadium: Gammliavallen

24 September 2000 Round 25	Malmö FF	2 – 0	Ljungskile SK	Malmö
	Ibrahimović 4'; Gudmundsson 8'			Stadium: Malmö Stadion

30 September 2000 Round 26	Enköpings SK	0 – 0	Malmö FF	Enköping
				Stadium: Enavallen

8 October 2000 Round 27	Malmö FF	2 – 0	Assyriska FF	Malmö
	Ibrahimović 3'; Sørensen 52'			Stadium: Malmö Stadion

14 October 2000 Round 28	Åtvidabergs FF	3 – 3	Malmö FF	Åtvidaberg
	Gärdeman 16'; Haglund 72'; D. Johansson 90'		Kindvall 3'; Lilienberg 76'; Ibrahimović 84'	Stadium: Kopparvallen

22 October 2000 Round 29	IK Brage	2 – 4	Malmö FF	Borlänge
	Vesterinen 15'; Ericsson 88' (pen.)		Elanga 28'; Mattisson 35'; Persson 61'; Kindvall 63'	Stadium: Domnarsvallen

29 October 2000 Round 30	Malmö FF	3 – 0	FC Café Opera	Malmö
	Ibrahimović 16, 60'; Kindvall 63'			Stadium: Malmö Stadion

== Club ==
=== Kit ===
Supplier: Puma
Sponsor(s): Nätverket

Home; Domestic	Away; Domestic

Source: Malmö FF

=== Other information ===
Chairman	(Sweden) Bengt Madsen
Ground (capacity and dimensions)	Malmö Stadion (27,500 / )

Updated to match played 19 October
Source: Malmö FF and Malmö Stadion
