= 1997 Malmö FF season =

Malmö FF
1997 season
- Manager: Frans Thijssen
- Allsvenskan: 3rd
- Svenska Cupen: Preliminary rounds
- UEFA Cup: 2nd qualifying round
- Top goalscorer: Niclas Kindvall (12)

Malmö FF were seriously involved in the 1997 chase for the Allsvenskan title, but fell short due to dropped points against bottom teams Degerfors and Öster in the 24th and 25th rounds out of 26. Having been unbeaten at home all season, playing decent possession football, the economic woes of the club forced them to sell Daniel Andersson and Yksel Osmanovski to Bari of Serie A the coming summer.

== Squad (players used in Allsvenskan) ==
=== Goalkeepers ===
- (Sweden) Jonnie Fedel

=== Defenders ===
- (Sweden) Mattias Thylander
- (Sweden) Jörgen Ohlsson
- (Sweden) Christian Karlsson
- (Sweden) Tommy Jönsson
- (Sweden) Brune Tavell
- (Sweden) Olof Persson
- (Sweden) Mike Owusu
- (Sweden) Jonas Wirmola

=== Midfielders ===
- (Sweden) Hasse Mattisson
- (Sweden) Daniel Andersson
- (Sweden) Goran Trpevski
- (Sweden) Anders Andersson
- (Sweden) Björn Enqvist
- (Sweden) Niklas Gudmundsson

=== Attackers ===
- (Sweden) Yksel Osmanovski
- (Sweden) Patrik Olsson
- (Sweden) Dejan Pavlović
- (Sweden) Greger Andrijevski
- (Sweden) Niclas Kindvall

== Allsvenskan ==
Pos	Team	Pld	W	D	L	GF	GA	GD	Pts	Qualification or relegation
1	Halmstads BK (C)	26	17	1	8	49	27	+22	52	Qualification to Champions League first qualifying round
2	IFK Göteborg	26	14	7	5	50	32	+18	49	Qualification to UEFA Cup first qualifying round
3	Malmö FF	26	12	10	4	48	28	+20	46	Qualification to UEFA Cup first qualifying round
4	Örebro SK	26	13	7	6	43	34	+9	46	Qualification to Intertoto Cup second round
5	Örgryte IS	26	12	7	7	34	29	+5	43	Qualification to Intertoto Cup first round

Rules for classification: 1) points; 2) goal difference; 3) number of goals scored.
(C) Champions

=== Matches ===
6 April 1997 Round 1	Malmö FF	2 – 0	Västerås SK	Malmö
	Jönsson 19'; Mattisson 72'			Stadium: Malmö Stadion

13 April 1997 Round 2	Halmstads BK	3 – 1	Malmö FF	Halmstad
	R. Andersson 53'; Mattsson 65'; Sakiri 90'		A. Andersson 50'	Stadium: Örjans Vall

21 April 1997 Round 3	Malmö FF	2 – 0	Degerfors IF	Malmö
	Karlsson 72'; D. Andersson 72'			Stadium: Malmö Stadion

24 April 1997 Round 4	IFK Norrköping	2 – 2	Malmö FF	Norrköping
	Suominen 28'; Saarenpää 84'		Kindvall 4'; D. Andersson 14'	Stadium: Idrottsparken

5 May 1997 Round 5	IF Elfsborg	1 – 1	Malmö FF	Borås
	Berglund 90' (pen.)		Mattisson 9'	Stadium: Ryavallen

11 May 1997 Round 6	Malmö FF	3 – 0	Örgryte IS	Malmö
	Mattisson 10'; Pavlović 36'; Andrijevski 81'			Stadium: Malmö Stadion

19 May 1997 Round 7	AIK	1 – 1	Malmö FF	Solna
	Nordin 65'		Osmanovski 50'	Stadium: Råsunda

25 May 1997 Round 8	Malmö FF	1 – 1	Östers IF	Malmö
	Kindvall 47'		Eklund 54'	Stadium: Malmö Stadion

1 June 1997 Round 9	Ljungskile SK	1 – 2	Malmö FF	Ljungskile
	Gravem 17'		Andrijevski 47, 64'	Stadium: Skarsjövallen

11 June 1997 Round 10	Malmö FF	1 – 1	Örebro SK	Malmö
	Andrijevski 70'		Gawelin 47'	Stadium: Malmö Stadion

16 June 1997 Round 11	Helsingborgs IF	2 – 1	Malmö FF	Helsingborg
	Jansson 12'; Nilsson 41' (pen.)		Kindvall 37'	Stadium: Olympia

23 June 1997 Round 12	Malmö FF	5 – 2	Trelleborgs FF	Malmö
	Kindvall 34'; A. Andersson 47'; P. Olsson 52'; Osmanovski 57'; D. Andersson 74'		Hansson 15'; Thylander 53' (o.g.)	Stadium: Malmö Stadion

28 June 1997 Round 13	IFK Göteborg	1 – 1	Malmö FF	Gothenburg
	Lindqvist 44'		Osmanovski 13'	Stadium: Gamla Ullevi

21 July 1997 Round 14	Malmö FF	1 – 1	IFK Göteborg	Malmö
	Thylander 30'		Pettersson 74'	Stadium: Malmö Stadion

30 July 1997 Round 15	Trelleborgs FF	2 – 1	Malmö FF	Trelleborg
	Hermansson 67, 90'		Kindvall 86'	Stadium: Vångavallen

3 August 1997 Round 16	Malmö FF	4 – 2	Helsingborgs IF	Malmö
	Osmanovski 5, 85'; D. Andersson 38' (pen.); Kindvall 40'		Jonson 41'; Wahlstedt 73'	Stadium: Malmö Stadion

9 August 1997 Round 17	Örebro SK	0 – 5	Malmö FF	Örebro
			Gudmundsson 3, 22'; Kindvall 8'; Enqvist 14'; Osmanovski 35'	Stadium: Eyravallen

16 August 1997 Round 18	Malmö FF	1 – 1	Ljungskile SK	Malmö
	Kindvall 52'		B. Wålemark 90'	Stadium: Malmö Stadion

23 August 1997 Round 19	Örgryte IS	0 – 2	Malmö FF	Gothenburg
			Kindvall 2, 84'	Stadium: Gamla Ullevi

31 August 1997 Round 20	Malmö FF	2 – 0	IF Elfsborg	Malmö
	Ohlsson 43'; Gudmundsson 71'			Stadium: Malmö Stadion

14 September 1997 Round 21	Malmö FF	2 – 1	Halmstads BK	Malmö
	Kindvall 4'; Osmanovski 15'		Ljungberg 38'	Stadium: Malmö Stadion

21 September 1997 Round 22	Västerås SK	1 – 2	Malmö FF	Västerås
	J. Svensson 47'		Enqvist 8'; Mattisson 84'	Stadium: Arosvallen

29 September 1997 Round 23	Malmö FF	2 – 0	IFK Norrköping	Malmö
	Ohlsson 31'; Osmanovski 36'			Stadium: Malmö Stadion

5 October 1997 Round 24	Degerfors IF	3 – 1	Malmö FF	Degerfors
	Ottosson 22, 61'; Radinović 74' (pen.)		Osmanovski 10'	Stadium: Stora Valla

15 October 1997 Round 25	Östers IF	2 – 2	Malmö FF	Växjö
	Eklund 45'; F. Bild 76'		Osmanovski 11'; Kindvall 35'	Stadium: Värendsvallen

26 October 1997 Round 26	Malmö FF	0 – 0	AIK	Malmö
				Stadium: Malmö Stadion

=== Top scorers ===
- Niclas Kindvall 12
- Yksel Osmanovski 10
- Hasse Mattisson 4
- Daniel Andersson 4

== Sources ==
- Fotboll 1997 (Swedish football yearbook)
