= 2001 Malmö FF season =

Malmö FF
2001 season
- Chairman: (Sweden) Bengt Madsen
- Manager: (Sweden) Michael Andersson
- Stadium: Malmö Stadion
- Allsvenskan: 9th
- Svenska Cupen: Semi-finals
- Top goalscorer: Jörgen Ohlsson (7)
Home colours	Away colours

Malmö FF competed in Allsvenskan and Svenska Cupen for the 2001 season. The club was back in Allsvenskan after one season in Superettan. Zlatan Ibrahimović was sold to AFC Ajax in the summer of 2001 after heavy discussions which raised the price tag to approximately €9 million, the largest transfer sum ever recorded in Swedish football history.

== Players ==
=== Squad stats ===
No.	Pos	Nat	Player	Total		Allsvenskan	
No.	Pos	Nat	Player	Apps	Goals	Apps	Goals
2	DF	(Sweden) SWE	Jörgen Ohlsson	26	7	26	7
29	DF	(Sweden) SWE	Olof Persson	25	0	25	0
11	MF	(Sweden) SWE	Erik Johansson	25	5	25	5
7	DF	(Cameroon) CMR	Joseph Elanga	24	3	24	3
4	DF	(Sweden) SWE	Daniel Majstorović	23	3	23	3
1	GK	(Sweden) SWE	Jonnie Fedel	22	0	22	0
18	DF	(Sweden) SWE	Jimmy Tamandi	22	1	22	1
10	FW	(Sweden) SWE	Mats Lilienberg	21	3	21	3
20	FW	(Nigeria) NGA	Peter Ijeh	20	4	20	4
5	DF	(Sweden) SWE	Mikael Roth	16	0	16	0
8	MF	(Denmark) DEN	Peter Sörensen	16	0	16	0
23	MF	(Denmark) DEN	Brian Steen Nielsen	15	0	15	0
25	FW	(Sweden) SWE	Markus Rosenberg	13	1	13	1
6	MF	(Sweden) SWE	Hasse Mattisson	11	3	11	3
28	FW	(Sweden) SWE	Niklas Skoog	9	3	9	3
9	FW	(Sweden) SWE	Zlatan Ibrahimović	8	3	8	3
3	DF	(Sweden) SWE	Robert Kjellin	8	0	8	0
19	MF	(Sweden) SWE	Kenneth Gustavsson	7	2	7	2
15	DF	(Sweden) SWE	Matias Concha	6	0	6	0
26	GK	(Sweden) SWE	Lee Baxter	4	0	4	0
13	MF	(Sweden) SWE	Marcus Winqvist	3	0	3	0
21	MF	(Sweden) SWE	Richard Oteng Mensah	3	0	3	0

== Competitions ==
=== Allsvenskan ===
==== League table ====
Pos	Team	Pld	W	D	L	GF	GA	GD	Pts
7	Halmstads BK	26	10	8	8	50	31	+19	38
8	Örebro SK	26	8	9	9	48	44	+4	33
9	Malmö FF	26	9	5	12	39	46	−7	32
10	IF Elfsborg	26	9	3	14	31	51	−20	30
11	GIF Sundsvall	26	7	8	11	28	37	−9	29

Source: svenskfotboll.se (in Swedish)
Rules for classification: 1) points; 2) goal difference; 3) number of goals scored.

==== Matches ====
9 April 2001 Round 1	Malmö FF	2 – 0	AIK	Malmö
	Ibrahimović 31', 55'			Stadium: Malmö Stadion; Attendance: 17,100

16 April 2001 Round 2	IF Elfsborg	0 – 2	Malmö FF	Borås
			Ohlsson 79'; Elanga 83'	Stadium: Ryavallen; Attendance: 11,611

21 April 2001 Round 3	Djurgårdens IF	0 – 4	Malmö FF	Stockholm
			Ijeh 18'; Elanga 67'; Ibrahimović 70'; Johansson 87'	Stadium: Stockholms Stadion; Attendance: 13,250

1 May 2001 Round 4	Malmö FF	0 – 0	IFK Norrköping	Malmö
				Stadium: Malmö Stadion; Attendance: 17,300

6 May 2001 Round 5	BK Häcken	2 – 1	Malmö FF	Gothenburg
	Henriksson 34', 64'		Ohlsson 31'	Stadium: Rambergsvallen; Attendance: 3,327

14 May 2001 Round 6	Malmö FF	0 – 6	IFK Göteborg	Malmö
			Ericsson 4'; Andersson 31'; Svensson 54'; Rosenkvist 76', 78'	Stadium: Malmö Stadion; Attendance: 12,109

20 May 2001 Round 7	Örebro SK	2 – 0	Malmö FF	Örebro
	Andersson 38'; Gawelin 70'			Stadium: Eyravallen; Attendance: 7,667

27 May 2001 Round 8	Malmö FF	1 – 0	Hammarby IF	Malmö
	Ohlsson 37'			Stadium: Malmö Stadion; Attendance: 7,204

11 June 2001 Round 9	Trelleborgs FF	0 – 4	Malmö FF	Trelleborg
			Gustavsson 42', 65'; Ohlsson 50'; Ijeh 67'	Stadium: Vångavallen; Attendance: 6,563

19 June 2001 Round 10	Malmö FF	0 – 1	Helsingborgs IF	Malmö
			Andersson 57'	Stadium: Malmö Stadion; Attendance: 26,500

26 June 2001 Round 11	Halmstads BK	4 – 2	Malmö FF	Halmstad
	Selaković 40', 54'; Jönsson 59'; Wowoah 90'		Majstorović 1'; Tamandi 72'	Stadium: Örjans Vall; Attendance: 12,087

2 July 2001 Round 12	Malmö FF	2 – 0	GIF Sundsvall	Malmö
	Majstorović 22'; Rosenberg 33'			Stadium: Malmö Stadion; Attendance: 7,819

8 July 2001 Round 13	Örgryte IS	1 – 4	Malmö FF	Gothenburg
	Elmander 90 + 4'		Johansson 40'; Ohlsson 45'; Lilienberg 46', 90 + 3'	Stadium: Gamla Ullevi; Attendance: 3,643

23 July 2001 Round 14	GIF Sundsvall	2 – 1	Malmö FF	Sundsvall
	Yngvesson 8', 48'		Skoog 22'	Stadium: Idrottsparken; Attendance: 5,000

29 July 2001 Round 15	Malmö FF	3 – 3	Halmstads BK	Malmö
	Mattisson 29', 43'; Johansson 77'		Selaković 56'; Bertilsson 83'; Jönsson 90 + 2'	Stadium: Malmö Stadion; Attendance: 9,450

6 August 2001 Round 16	Helsingborgs IF	1 – 1	Malmö FF	Helsingborg
	Santos 27'		Ijeh 60'	Stadium: Olympia; Attendance: 15,527

12 August 2001 Round 17	Malmö FF	1 – 3	Trelleborgs FF	Malmö
	Ohlsson 67'		Andrijevski 11', 28'; Svensson 54'	Stadium: Malmö Stadion; Attendance: 9,004

22 August 2001 Round 18	Malmö FF	2 – 1	Örgryte IS	Malmö
	Lilienberg 32'; Johansson 88'		Aubynn 35'	Stadium: Malmö Stadion; Attendance: 9,314

26 August 2001 Round 19	IFK Norrköping	1 – 1	Malmö FF	Norrköping
	Östlund 78'		Majstorović 90 + 2'	Stadium: Idrottsparken; Attendance: 9,487

11 September 2001 Round 20	Malmö FF	1 – 3	Djurgårdens IF	Malmö
	Skoog 11'		Johansson 68'; Henriksson 78'; Mattiasson 90 + 3'	Stadium: Malmö Stadion; Attendance: 12,056

17 September 2001 Round 21	IFK Göteborg	4 – 0	Malmö FF	Gothenburg
	Andersson 13'; Rosenkvist 70'; Mild 89'; Henriksson 90 + 2'			Stadium: Gamla Ullevi; Attendance: 9,089

24 September 2001 Round 22	Malmö FF	2 – 2	BK Häcken	Malmö
	Elanga 1', 70'		Göransson 37'; Eriksson	Stadium: Malmö Stadion; Attendance: 5,201

1 October 2001 Round 23	Hammarby IF	4 – 1	Malmö FF	Stockholm
	Kennedy 33'; Markstedt 55'; Bergman 66'; Hermansson 90 + 3'		Ijeh 25'	Stadium: Söderstadion; Attendance: 10,496

15 October 2001 Round 24	Malmö FF	1 – 3	Örebro SK	Malmö
	Mattisson 57'		Paulsson 9' own goal 35'; Andersson 81'	Stadium: Malmö Stadion; Attendance: 5,292

22 October 2001 Round 25	Malmö FF	3 – 1	IF Elfsborg	Malmö
	Skoog 62'; Ohlsson 88'; Johansson 90 + 1'		Drugge 76'	Stadium: Malmö Stadion; Attendance: 8,671

27 October 2001 Round 26	AIK	2 – 0	Malmö FF	Solna
	Ishizaki 51'; Alm 55'			Stadium: Råsunda; Attendance: 12,390

== Club ==
=== Kit ===
Supplier: Puma
Sponsor(s): Nätverket

Home; Domestic	Away; Domestic

Source: Malmö FF

=== Other information ===
Chairman	(Sweden) Bengt Madsen
Ground (capacity and dimensions)	Malmö Stadion (27,500 / )

Updated to match played 19 October
Source: Malmö FF and Malmö Stadion
