= 1994 Malmö FF season =

Malmö FF
1994 season
- Manager: Rolf Zetterlund
- Allsvenskan: 3rd
- Svenska Cupen: Semi-final
- Top goalscorer: Jörgen Pettersson (14)

Malmö FF had a resurgence on the domestic scene in 1994, following a disappointing 1993 campaign that nearly ended in having to seal the stay in the top flight through playout.

Under new coach Rolf Zetterlund, Malmö fought for the league title, with young striker Jörgen Pettersson scoring 14 goals and veteran playmaker Robert Prytz being influential in the relative success.

== Squad ==
The squad list contains players used in 1994 Allsvenskan.

=== Goalkeepers ===
- (Sweden) Jonnie Fedel
- (Sweden) Carsten Olausson
- (Sweden) Björn Stringheim

=== Defenders ===
- (Sweden) Niclas Nylén
- (Sweden) Torbjörn Persson
- (Sweden) Jonas Wirmola
- (Sweden) Henrik Nilsson
- (Sweden) Tommy Jönsson

=== Midfielders ===
- (Sweden) Anders Andersson
- (Sweden) Jörgen Ohlsson
- (Sweden) Robert Prytz
- (Sweden) Jens Fjellström
- (Sweden) Joakim Persson
- (Finland) Mika Nurmela
- (North Macedonia) Erol Bekir
- (Sweden) Stefan Alvén

=== Attackers ===
- (Sweden) Peter Hillgren
- (Sweden) Jörgen Pettersson
- (Sweden) Fredrik Dahlström

== Allsvenskan ==
Pos	Team	Pld	W	D	L	GF	GA	GD	Pts	Qualification or relegation
1	IFK Göteborg (C)	26	16	6	4	54	28	+26	54	Qualification to Champions League qualifying round
2	Örebro SK	26	15	7	4	62	30	+32	52	Qualification to UEFA Cup preliminary round
3	Malmö FF	26	14	7	5	51	33	+18	49	Qualification to UEFA Cup preliminary round
4	IFK Norrköping	26	13	8	5	52	22	+30	47	Qualification to Intertoto Cup group stage
5	Östers IF	26	13	6	7	48	30	+18	45	Qualification to Intertoto Cup group stage

Rules for classification: 1) points; 2) goal difference; 3) number of goals scored.
(C) Champions

=== Fixtures ===
4 April 1994 Round 1	Malmö FF	1 – 0	Degerfors IF	Malmö
	Prytz 65' (pen.)			Stadium: Malmö Stadion

10 April 1994 Round 2	Östers IF	2 – 4	Malmö FF	Växjö
	Eklund 58'; Wibrån 76'		Fjellström 28, 42, 43'; Pettersson 69'	Stadium: Värendsvallen

14 April 1994 Round 3	Malmö FF	2 – 2	AIK	Malmö
	Pettersson 6' (pen.); Nylén 54'		Simpson 18'; Lidman 83' (pen.)	Stadium: Malmö Stadion

17 April 1994 Round 4	Landskrona BoIS	1 – 1	Malmö FF	Landskrona
	Andrijevski 58'		Wirmola 10'	Stadium: Landskrona IP

24 April 1994 Round 5	Malmö FF	5 – 1	BK Häcken	Malmö
	Fjellström 11, 57'; Ohlsson 13' (pen.); Prytz 27' (pen.); Hillgren 71' (pen.)		Palmqvist 21'	Stadium: Malmö Stadion

1 May 1994 Round 6	IFK Norrköping	1 – 1	Malmö FF	Norrköping
	Sandström 37'		Ohlsson 13'	Stadium: Idrottsparken

9 May 1994 Round 7	IFK Göteborg	3 – 4	Malmö FF	Gothenburg
	Martinsson 6' (pen.); Erlingmark 19'; T. Andersson 34'		Wirmola 47'; Nylén 51'; A. Andersson 67'; Persson 74'	Stadium: Gamla Ullevi

15 May 1994 Round 8	Malmö FF	4 – 0	Hammarby IF	Malmö
	Fjellström 36, 85'; Pettersson 51, 65'			Stadium: Malmö Stadion

19 May 1994 Round 9	Helsingborgs IF	0 – 0	Malmö FF	Helsingborg
				Stadium: Olympia

24 May 1994 Round 10	Malmö FF	3 – 2	Örebro SK	Malmö
	Pettersson 36'; Nilsson 37'; Dahlström 59'		Sjögren 4'; Jonson 60'	Stadium: Malmö Stadion

30 May 1994 Round 11	Malmö FF	0 – 1	Trelleborgs FF	Malmö
			Hansson 35' (pen.)	Stadium: Malmö Stadion

20 July 1994 Round 12	Halmstads BK	1 – 2	Malmö FF	Halmstad
	R. Andersson 83'		Hillgren 45, 71'	Stadium: Örjans Vall

3 August 1994 Round 13	Trelleborgs FF	1 – 2	Malmö FF	Trelleborg
	Manglind 15'		Hillgren 49'; Pettersson 68'	Stadium: Vångavallen

8 August 1994 Round 14	Västra Frölunda IF	4 – 1	Malmö FF	Gothenburg
	Teberio 5, 42, 51'; Ahlbom 68'		Hillgren 85'	Stadium: Ruddalens IP

14 August 1994 Round 15	Malmö FF	3 – 1	Halmstads BK	Malmö
	Pettersson 32'; Jönsson 42'; Prytz 83'		R. Andersson 14'	Stadium: Malmö Stadion

21 August 1994 Round 16	Malmö FF	1 – 1	Östers IF	Malmö
	Pettersson 24'		Ernstsson 76'	Stadium: Malmö Stadion

28 August 1994 Round 17	Degerfors IF	2 – 6	Malmö FF	Degerfors
	A. Andersson 65'; Berger 86'		Dahlström 3'; Pettersson 9, 50, 85'; Prytz 64, 74'	Stadium: Stora Valla

31 August 1994 Round 18	Malmö FF	2 – 0	Helsingborgs IF	Malmö
	Fjellström 57, 59'			Stadium: Malmö Stadion

11 September 1994 Round 19	Örebro SK	4 – 1	Malmö FF	Örebro
	Fursth 2'; Guðjohnsen 36, 41'; Powell 78'		Dahlström 56'	Stadium: Eyravallen

14 September 1994 Round 20	Malmö FF	0 – 0	Västra Frölunda IF	Malmö
				Stadium: Malmö Stadion

18 September 1994 Round 21	Malmö FF	2 – 1	IFK Norrköping	Malmö
	Pettersson 23'; Prytz 65' (pen.)		Kindvall 26'	Stadium: Malmö Stadion

26 September 1994 Round 22	BK Häcken	0 – 0	Malmö FF	Gothenburg
				Stadium: Rambergsvallen

3 October 1994 Round 23	Malmö FF	3 – 0	Landskrona BoIS	Malmö
	Prytz 25'; Ohlsson 38'; Dahlström 64'			Stadium: Malmö Stadion

6 October 1994 Round 24	AIK	1 – 2	Malmö FF	Solna
	Jansson 87'		A. Andersson 43'; Pettersson 78'	Stadium: Råsunda

17 October 1994 Round 25	Hammarby IF	2 – 0	Malmö FF	Stockholm
	Strandh 23, 63'			Stadium: Söderstadion

23 October 1994 Round 26	Malmö FF	1 – 2	IFK Göteborg	Malmö
	Pettersson 24'		Lindqvist 21'; Martinsson 75'	Stadium: Malmö Stadion

=== Top scorers ===
- (Sweden) Jörgen Pettersson 14
- (Sweden) Jens Fjellström 9
- (Sweden) Robert Prytz 7
- (Sweden) Peter Hillgren 5
- (Sweden) Fredrik Dahlström 4

== Sources ==
- Årets fotboll 1994 (Swedish)
