= Flygare =

Flygare is a Swedish surname, meaning "someone who can fly". It is unusual for ending with are and was originally a name for Swedish soldiers from the 17th to the 19th century, but also present in industrial communities of Uppland. Notable people with the surname include:

- Bror Flygare (1888–1943), Swedish wrestler
- Tony Flygare (born 1981), Swedish footballer
