= Thomas Andersson =

Thomas Andersson may refer to:

- Thomas Andersson (footballer, born 1956), Swedish footballer for VfL Bochum and AIK
- Thomas Andersson (footballer, born 1968), Swedish footballer for Örebo SK
