= Fridh =

Fridh is a surname. Notable people with the surname include:

- Gertrud Fridh (1921–1984), Swedish actress
- Lennart Fridh, Swedish footballer
- Per Olsson Fridh (born 1981), Swedish politician
