= Olausson =

Olausson is a surname. Notable people with the surname include:

- Carsten Olausson, Swedish footballer
- Fredrik Olausson (born 1966), Swedish ice hockey player
- Joakim Olausson (born 1995), Swedish footballer
- Lars Olausson, a retired Lieutenant Colonel of the Swedish Air Force
- Mats Olausson (born 1961), Swedish keyboard player in several bands
- Niklas Olausson (born 1986), professional Swedish ice hockey player
- Peter Olausson (born 1971), Swedish author
