= Jörgen Persson (disambiguation) =

Jörgen Persson can refer to:

- Jörgen Persson, Swedish table tennis player
- Jörgen Persson (footballer), Swedish footballer
- Jörgen Persson (cinematographer), Swedish cinematographer
