= Lennart Hansson =

Lennart Hansson may refer to

- Lennart Hansson (footballer), Swedish association football player
- Lennart Hansson (rower) (1931–2013), Swedish rower
