= Ölmstads IS =

Swedish football club

- Full name: Ölmstads Idrottssällskap
- Founded: 1936
- Ground: ÖIS Gården; Ölmstad; Sweden
- Chairman: Michael Eskilsson
- League: Division 5 Småland nordvästra

Ölmstads IS is a Swedish football club located in Ölmstad.

== Background ==
Ölmstads IS currently plays in Division 5 Småland nordvästra which is the seventh tier of Swedish football. They play their home matches at ÖIS Gården in Ölmstad.

The club is affiliated to Smålands Fotbollförbund.
