= 2001 Allsvenskan =

77th season of Allsvenskan

Allsvenskan
- Season: 2001
- Champions: Hammarby IF
- Relegated: BK Häcken; Trelleborgs FF
- Champions League: Hammarby IF
- UEFA Cup: Djurgårdens IF
- Top goalscorer: Stefan Selakovic, Halmstads BK (15)
- Average attendance: 8,441

Allsvenskan 2001, part of the 2001 Swedish football season, was the 77th Allsvenskan season played. The first match was played 7 April 2001 and the last match was played 27 October 2001. Hammarby IF won the league ahead of runners-up Djurgårdens IF, while BK Häcken and Trelleborgs FF were relegated.

== Participating clubs ==
Location of the participating clubs

Club	Last season	First season in league	First season of current spell
AIK	3rd	1924–25	1981
Djurgårdens IF	1st (Superettan)	1927–28	2001
IF Elfsborg	5th	1926–27	1997
IFK Göteborg	4th	1924–25	1977
Halmstads BK	1st	1933–34	1993
Hammarby IF	8th	1924–25	1998
Helsingborgs IF	2nd	1924–25	1993
BK Häcken	12th	1983	2000
Malmö FF	2nd (Superettan)	1931–32	2001
IFK Norrköping	9th	1924–25	1984
GIF Sundsvall	11th	1965	2000
Trelleborgs FF	6th	1985	1992
Örebro SK	10th	1946–47	1989
Örgryte IS	7th	1924–25	1995

== League table ==
Pos	Team	Pld	W	D	L	GF	GA	GD	Pts	Qualification or relegation
1	Hammarby IF (C)	26	14	6	6	45	28	+17	48	Qualification to Champions League second qualifying round
2	Djurgårdens IF	26	13	8	5	36	24	+12	47	Qualification to UEFA Cup qualifying round
3	AIK	26	12	9	5	45	29	+16	45	Qualification to UEFA Cup qualifying round
4	IFK Göteborg	26	12	8	6	41	31	+10	44	Qualification to UEFA Cup qualifying round
5	Helsingborgs IF	26	11	9	6	47	29	+18	42	Qualification to Intertoto Cup first round
6	Örgryte IS	26	10	9	7	36	33	+3	39	
7	Halmstads BK	26	10	8	8	50	31	+19	38	
8	Örebro SK	26	8	9	9	48	44	+4	33	
9	Malmö FF	26	9	5	12	39	46	−7	32	
10	IF Elfsborg	26	9	3	14	31	51	−20	30	
11	GIF Sundsvall	26	7	8	11	28	37	−9	29	
12	IFK Norrköping (O)	26	7	8	11	29	40	−11	29	Qualification to Relegation play-offs
13	BK Häcken (R)	26	5	9	12	35	50	−15	24	Relegation to Superettan
14	Trelleborgs FF (R)	26	3	5	18	25	62	−37	14	Relegation to Superettan

Source: svenskfotboll.se (in Swedish)
Rules for classification: 1) points; 2) goal difference; 3) number of goals scored.
(C) Champions; (O) Play-off winners; (R) Relegated

== Results ==
Home \ Away	AIK	DIF	IFE	IFKG	HBK	HAM	HEL	BKH	MFF	IFKN	GIFS	TFF	ÖSK	ÖIS
AIK		1–1	3–1	1–1	2–3	5–2	2–2	2–0	2–0	1–1	2–0	2–1	0–0	2–2
Djurgårdens IF	1–2		3–0	3–1	2–1	2–0	3–2	2–1	0–4	0–2	1–1	0–0	2–0	0–0
IF Elfsborg	1–2	1–2		3–2	0–2	0–3	1–1	3–1	0–2	1–0	3–2	2–0	1–0	0–3
IFK Göteborg	1–0	0–2	2–2		2–1	1–0	2–1	1–1	4–0	2–1	1–1	3–2	3–1	1–1
Halmstads BK	2–2	0–0	5–0	0–0		1–2	2–2	2–2	4–2	4–0	1–1	5–2	3–0	0–1
Hammarby IF	0–0	0–1	1–0	1–1	1–0		3–1	2–2	4–1	1–1	1–0	4–1	3–0	3–2
Helsingborgs IF	2–0	1–0	3–0	3–0	1–0	1–3		1–0	1–1	0–1	3–0	3–0	2–2	5–0
BK Häcken	1–6	1–2	2–3	3–0	2–1	0–0	2–2		2–1	0–2	2–1	2–2	2–6	0–3
Malmö FF	2–0	1–3	3–1	0–6	3–3	1–0	0–1	2–2		0–0	2–0	1–3	1–3	2–1
IFK Norrköping	1–3	2–0	0–3	2–3	0–3	1–2	1–1	1–1	1–1		0–0	5–0	1–5	0–0
GIF Sundsvall	1–2	0–0	1–3	1–0	3–1	1–0	2–2	1–0	2–1	3–0		0–1	1–4	2–2
Trelleborgs FF	1–1	0–3	3–0	0–0	0–3	2–3	0–3	0–4	0–4	0–1	2–3		1–1	1–4
Örebro SK	1–2	2–2	4–1	1–2	1–1	0–3	3–3	2–2	2–0	5–3	1–1	3–2		1–1
Örgryte IS	1–0	1–1	1–1	0–2	0–2	3–3	1–0	2–0	1–4	1–2	2–0	2–1	1–0	

Source: Swedish Football Association (in Swedish)
Legend: Blue = home team win; Yellow = draw; Red = away team win.

== Relegation play-offs ==
31 October 2001
14:00 CET

Mjällby AIF	2–1	IFK Norrköping
Hermansson 5'; Ekenberg 18'	Report 1 Report 2	Wallerstedt 74'

Strandvallen, Mjällby
Referee: Martin Ingvarsson

3 November 2001
16:00 CET

IFK Norrköping	3–1	Mjällby AIF
Wallerstedt 27', 62'; Blomberg 61'	Report 1 Report 2	Nilsson 30'

Idrottsparken, Norrköping
Referee: Anders Frisk

IFK Norrköping won 4–3 on aggregate.

== Season statistics ==
=== Top scorers ===
Rank	Player	Club	Goals
1	(Sweden) Stefan Selakovic	Halmstads BK	15
2	(Sweden) Andreas Hermansson	Hammarby IF	14
3	(Sweden) Johan Paulsson	Örebro SK	13
4	(Sweden) Hans Eklund	Helsingborgs IF	11
5	(Sweden) Andreas Andersson	AIK	9
5	(Sweden) Jonas Nilsson	Trelleborgs FF	9
7	(Sweden) Kennedy Bakircioglu	Hammarby IF	8
7	(Sweden) Kim Källström	BK Häcken	8
9	(Sweden) Fredrik Berglund	IF Elfsborg	7
9	(Sweden) Jones Kusi-Asare	Djurgårdens IF	7
9	(Sweden) Rade Prica	Helsingborgs IF	7

=== Attendances ===
	Club	Home average	Away average	Home high
1	AIK	15,496	11,203	34,593
2	Hammarby IF	13,614	12,191	34,275
3	Djurgårdens IF	12,481	11,383	28,060
4	Malmö FF	11,315	9,238	26,500
5	Helsingborgs IF	10,769	9,251	15,527
6	IFK Göteborg	10,245	10,206	16,095
7	IFK Norrköping	8,635	7,815	18,047
8	IF Elfsborg	7,356	7,540	14,662
9	Halmstads BK	6,672	7,029	12,181
10	Örebro SK	6,572	6,561	10,607
11	GIF Sundsvall	4,818	5,889	7,000
12	Örgryte IS	4,473	7,469	16,978
13	BK Häcken	3,048	5,881	7,224
14	Trelleborgs FF	2,660	6,499	6,563
—	Total	8,440	—	34,593
