= Ölmstad Church =

Coordinates: 57.9293°N 14.3752°E

- Ölmstads kyrka
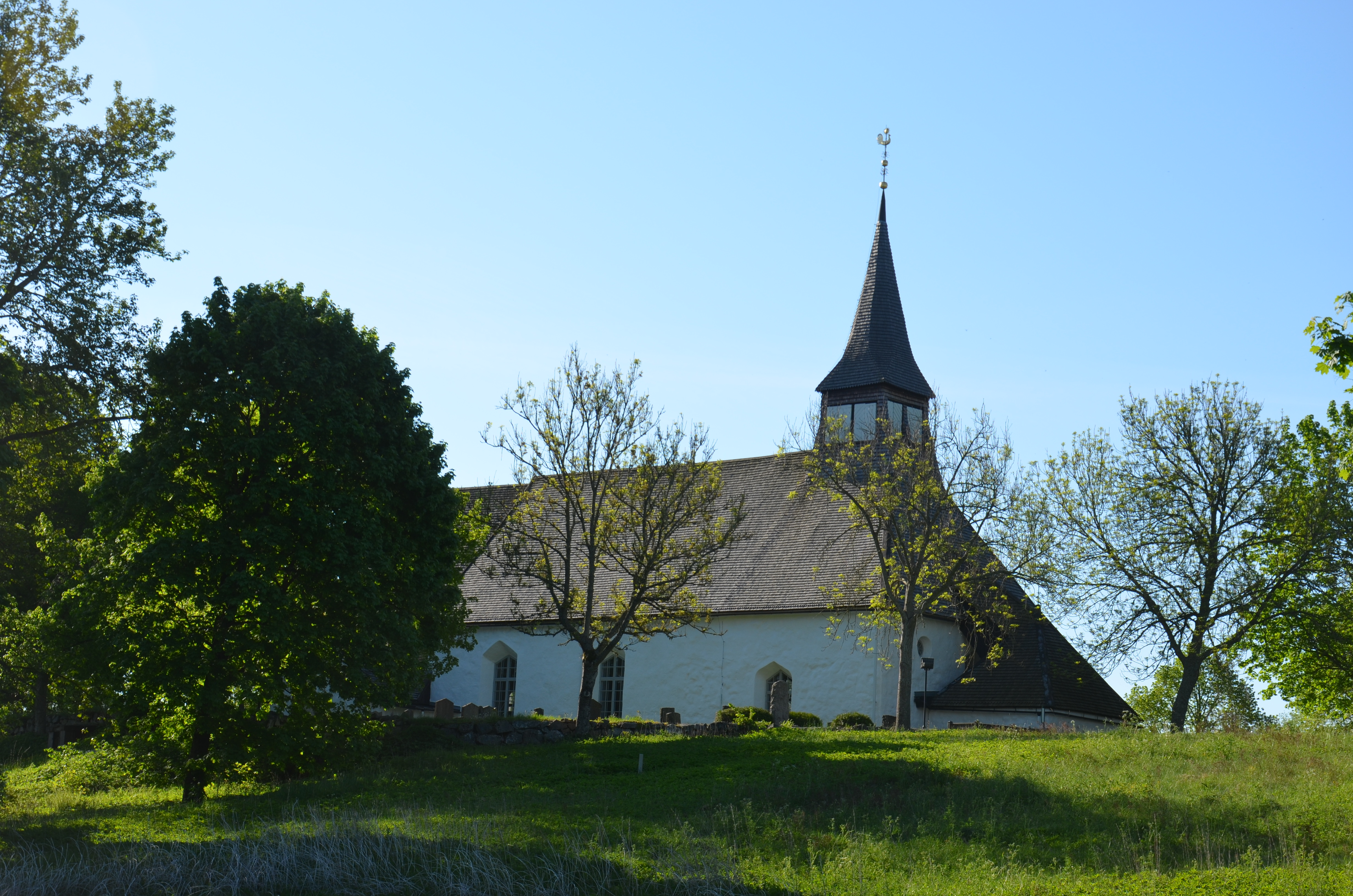
- Ölmstad Church in May 2012
- Ölmstad Church
- Location: Ölmstad
- Country: Sweden
- Denomination: Church of Sweden

Administration
- Diocese: Växjö
- Parish: Skärstad-Ölmstad

Ölmstad Church (Swedish: Ölmstads kyrka) is a medieval era church at Ölmstad in Jönköping County, Sweden. Ölmstad Church belongs to the Skärstad-Ölmstad parish in the Diocese of Växjö of the Church of Sweden.

== History ==
The church is believed to be dated to 12th century. During the 1400s, the church was burned. During repair, the present choir and sacristy were added. In 1568, the church was plundered by Danish troops under the leadership of Daniel Rantzau (1529–1569) during the Northern Seven Years' War and the church was restored. In 1729, the tower was added to the west side and replaced a former bell tower.

The baptismal font in red sandstone is from the 12th century and is considered to have been made by the workshop of an anonymous stone master referred to as Bestiarius. The triumphal cross is from the 15th century. The pulpit was manufactured in 1649 by mäster Päder Knutzsson.

The current organ dates to 1885 and was made by Åkerman & Lund Orgelbyggeri of Sundbyberg. Prior organs were made by Georg Hum in 1680 and by Jonas Wistenius (1700-1777) in 1774.

In 2000, the church was refurbished both internally and externally.

== Gallery ==
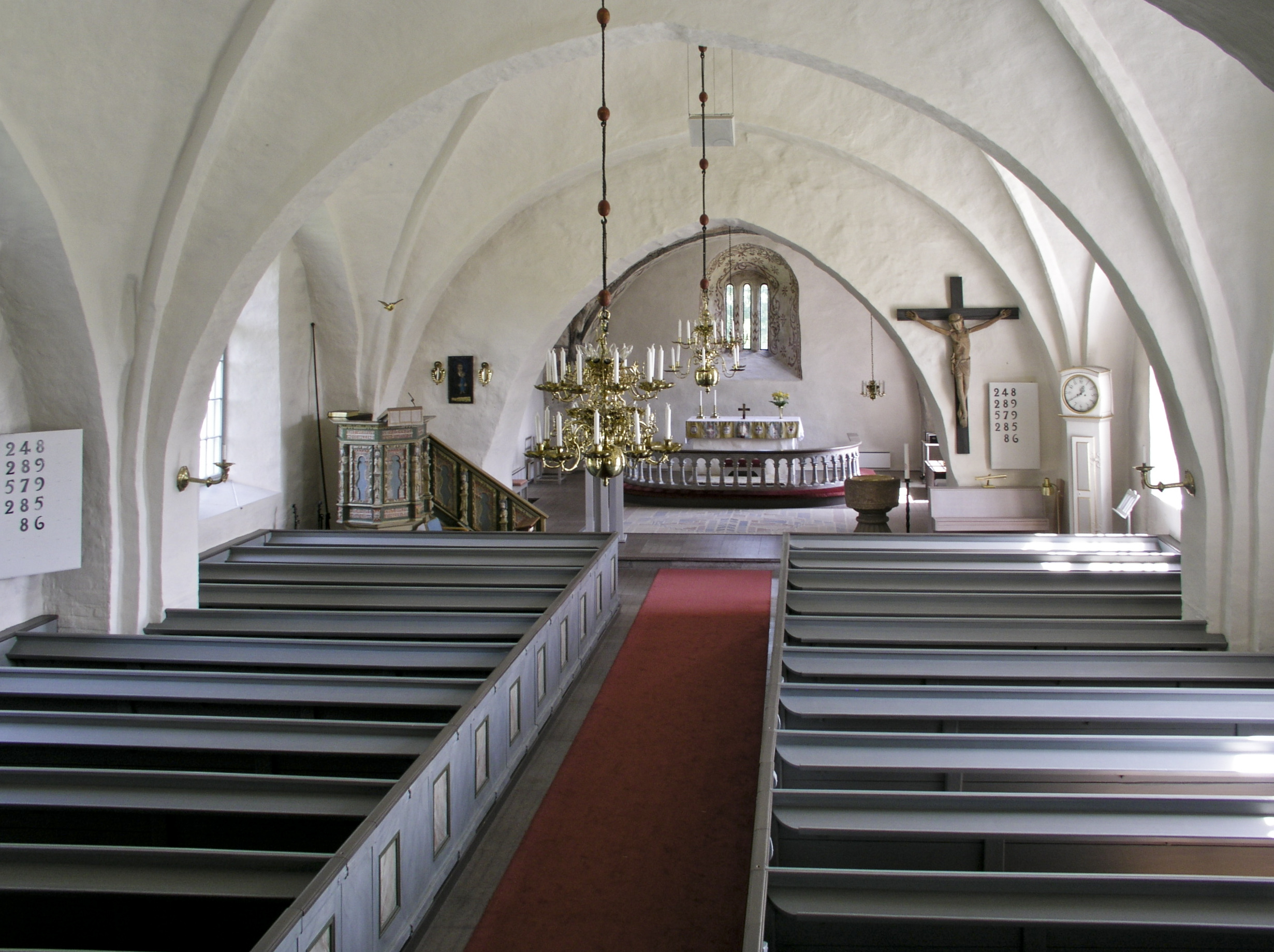

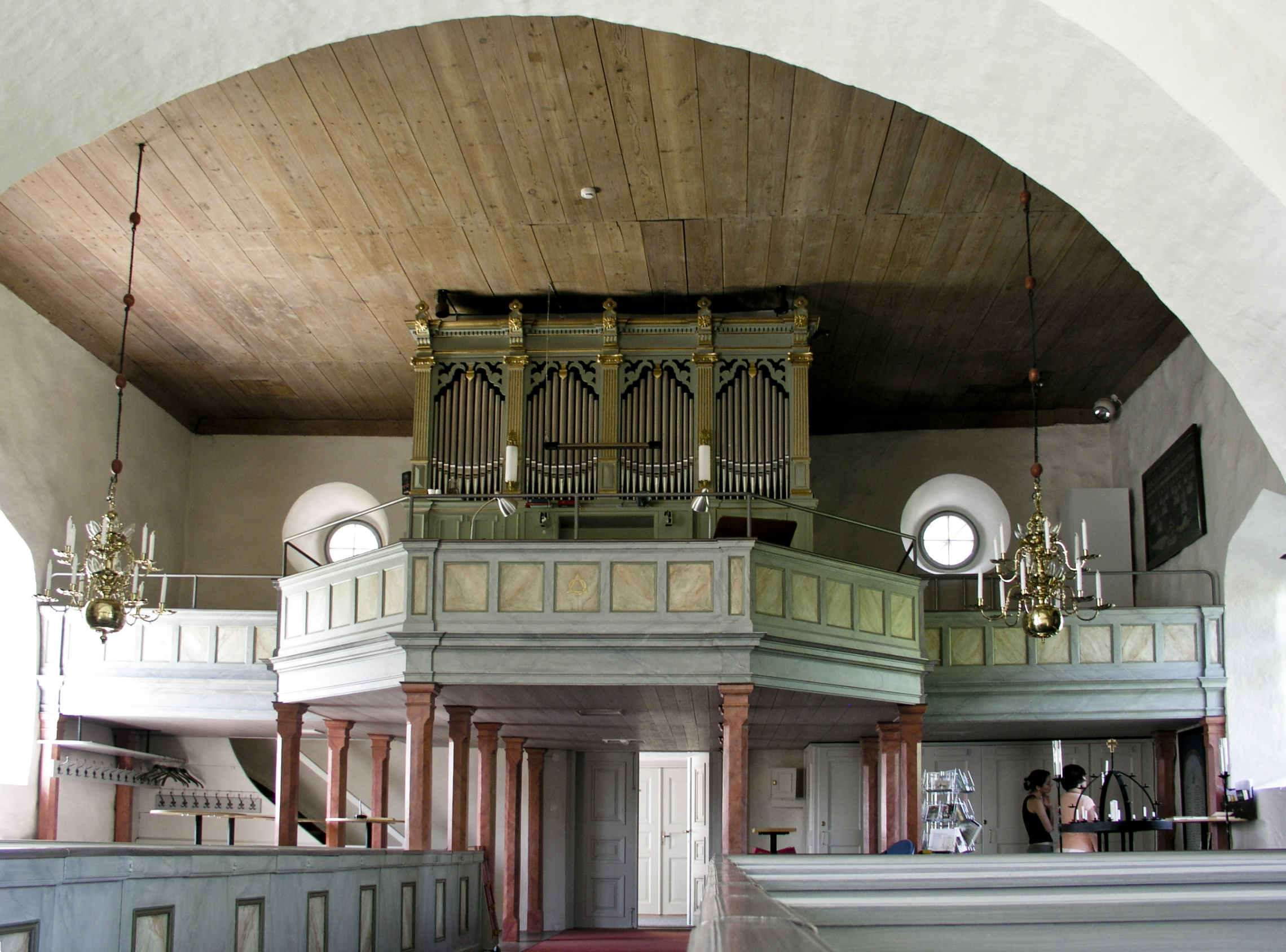

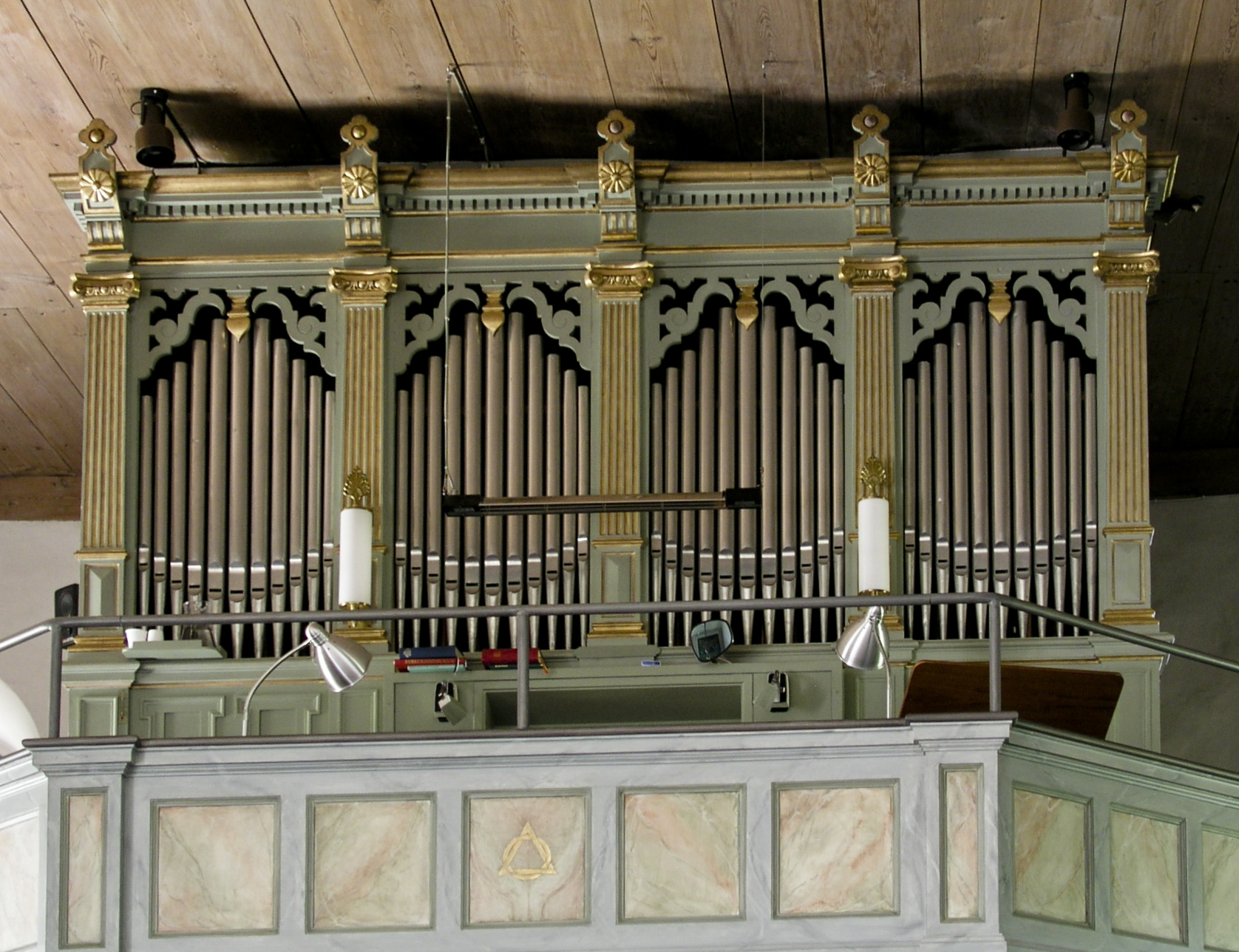

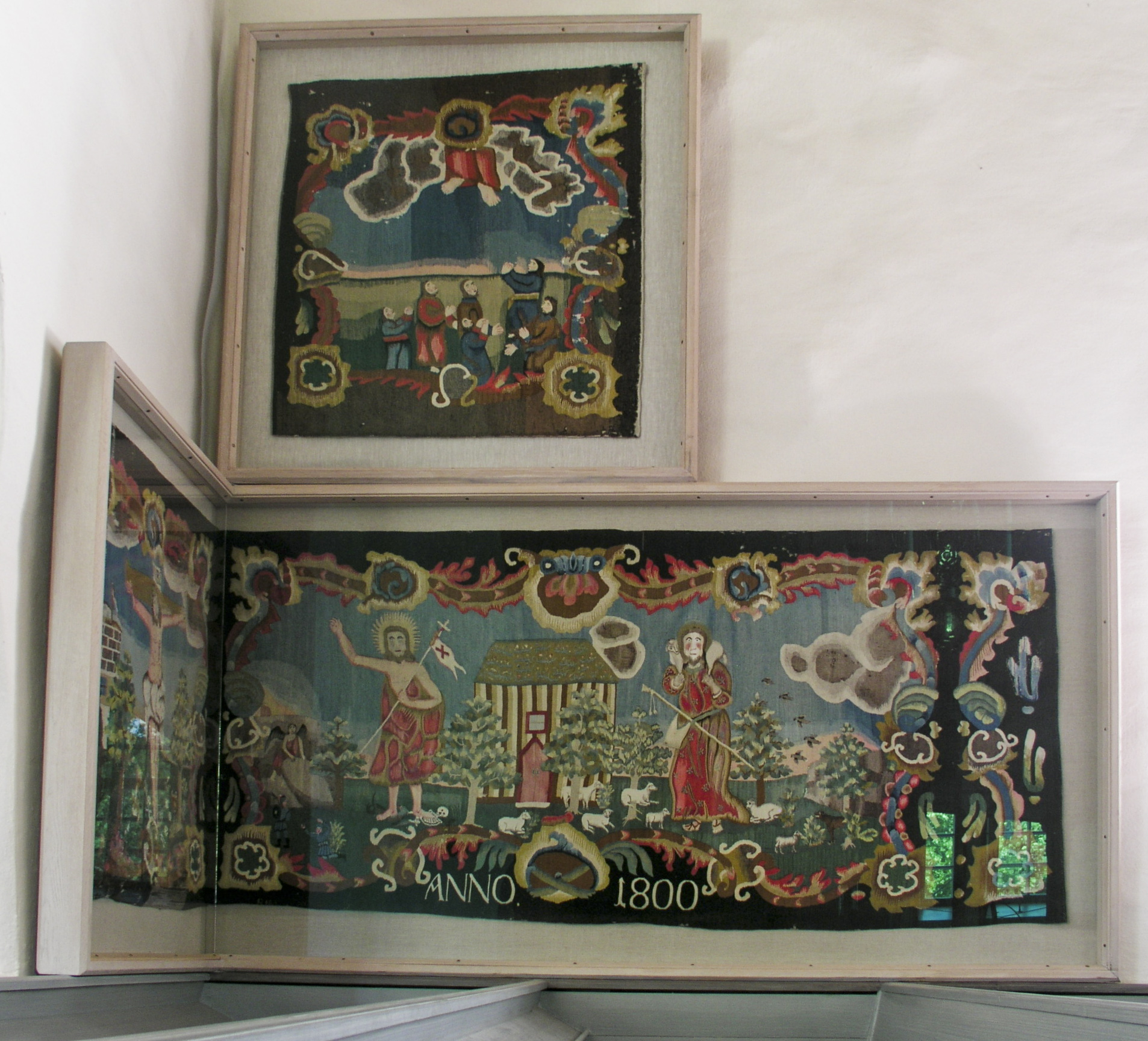

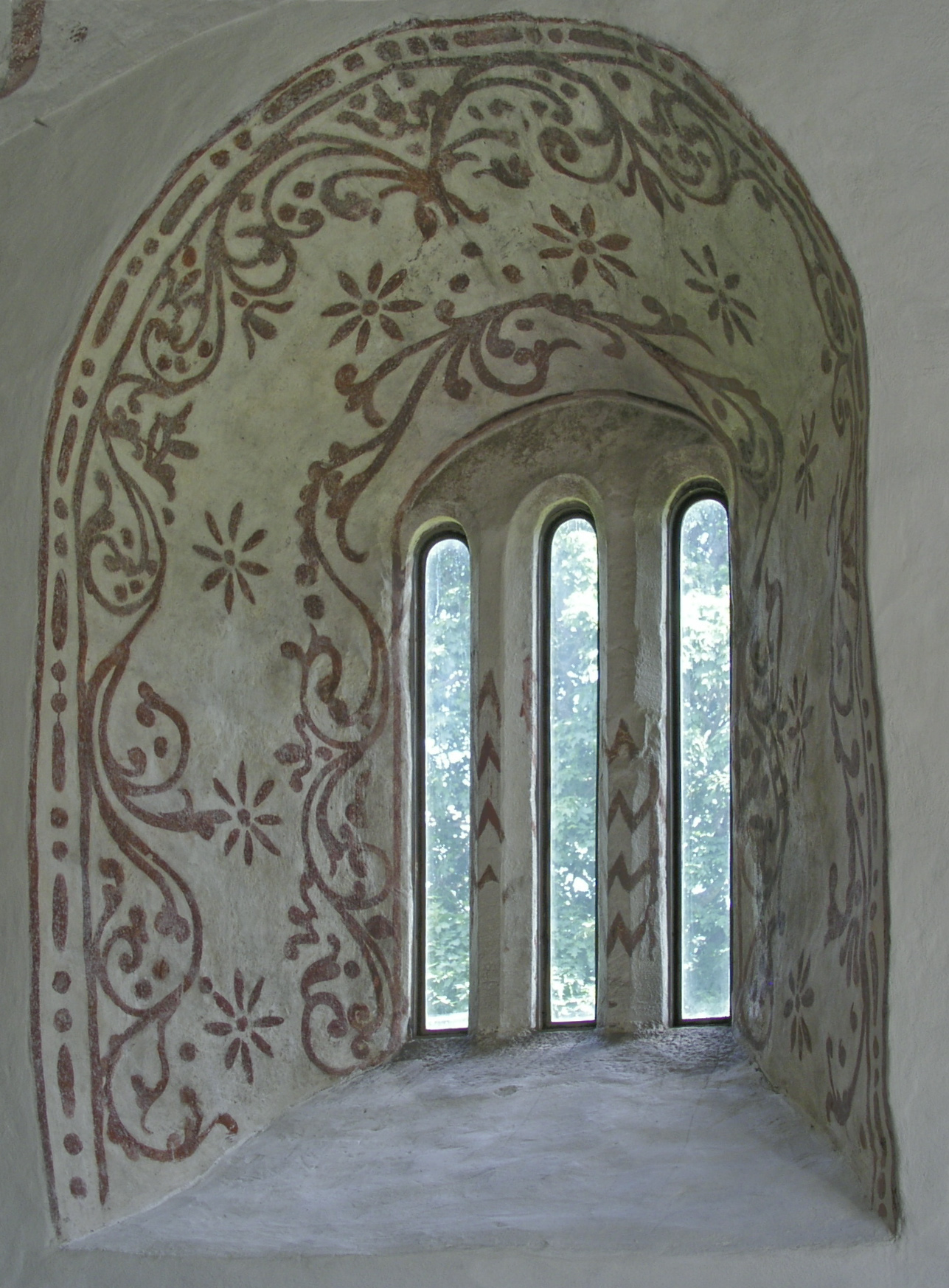
