= Per-Åke Åkesson =

Swedish footballer

Personal information
- Full name: Per-Åke Åkesson
- Date of birth: 16 January 1955 (age 71)
- Position: Forward

Senior career*
Years	Team	Apps	(Gls)
1974–1977	Malmö FF	24	(2)
- * Club domestic league appearances and goals

Per-Åke Åkesson (born 16 January 1955) is a Swedish former footballer who played as a forward.
