= Mattias Thylander =

Swedish footballer

Personal information
- Full name: Mattias Thylander
- Date of birth: 22 October 1974 (age 52)
- Place of birth: Höllviken, Sweden
- Height: 1.83 m (6 ft 0 in)
- Positions: Defender; midfielder

Youth career
- Höllvikens GIF

Senior career*
Years	Team	Apps	(Gls)
–1990	Höllvikens GIF		
1991–1999	Malmö FF	85	(5)
2000–2001	AIK	26	(0)
2002–2003	Halmstads BK	31	(1)
2004–2005	Silkeborg IF	17	(1)
2005–2009	Trelleborgs FF	85	(4)
2010–2011	Höörs IS		

International career
	Sweden U-21	6	(0)
1997	Sweden	1	(0)
- * Club domestic league appearances and goals

Mattias Thylander (born 22 October 1974) is a Swedish former football player, who played as a defender or midfielder.

Thylander started his career at his hometown club Höllvikens GIF before moving to Allsvenskan giants Malmö FF in 1991. He left Malmö following the club's relegation in 1999 to sign for rival club AIK. He also played for Halmstads BK, Silkeborg IF, and Trelleborgs FF before retiring in 2011.
