= Ölmstad =

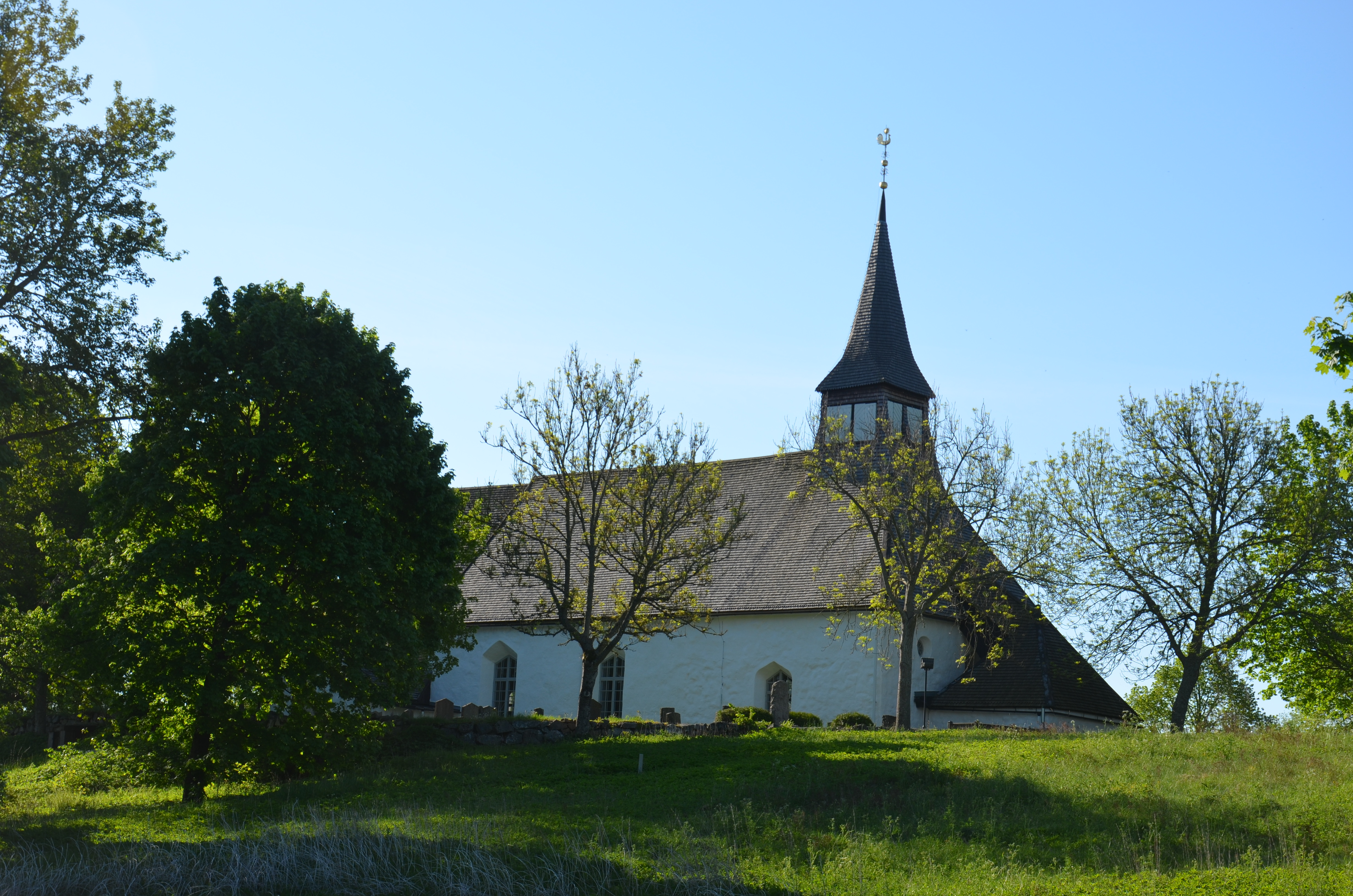
- Ölmstad Church in May 2012

- Location within Jönköping Location within Sweden
- Coordinates: 57°56′N 14°22′E
- Country: Sweden
- Province: Småland
- County: Jönköping County
- Municipality: Jönköping Municipality

Area
  - Total: 0.43 km^{2} (0.17 sq mi)

Population (31 December 2010)
  - Total: 296
  - Density: 687/km^{2} (1,780/sq mi)
- Time zone: UTC+1 (CET)
  - Summer (DST): UTC+2 (CEST)
- Climate: Dfb

Ölmstad is a locality situated in Jönköping Municipality, Jönköping County, Sweden with 296 inhabitants in 2010.

Ölmstad Church (Ölmstad kyrka) dates from the 12th century when monks from Alvastra Abbey began to build the first stone church. The baptismal font in the church originates from this time. The pulpit is from 1649. The large crucifix is from the 15th century and has hung in various places in the church. In 1567, during the Northern Seven Years' War, the church was looted by Danish forces under the leadership of Daniel Rantzau. The church was rebuilt shortly thereafter. In 1729, the tower was built which then replaced a former bell tower.
