= Björn Morgan Enqvist =

Swedish footballer

Björn Enqvist
Personal information
- Full name: Björn Morgan Enqvist
- Date of birth: 12 October 1977 (age 49)
- Place of birth: Lund, Sweden
- Height: 1.80 m (5 ft 11 in)
- Position: Central midfielder

Youth career
- 1987–1995: Malmö FF

Senior career*
Years	Team	Apps	(Gls)
1995–1997	Crystal Palace	0	(0)
1997–1999	Malmö FF	49	(9)
1999–2001	VPS Vaasa	35	(7)
2001–2002	GAIS	48	(6)
2003–2004	Apollon Smyrnis	44	(5)
2004–2006	Panachaiki	36	(6)
2006–2007	Kastoria	20	(2)
2007-Jul	Nea Salamis Famagusta	11	(0)
2007–2009	APEP Pitsilia	39	(3)
2009–2010	Veria FC	30	(1)
2010–2011	Aris Limassol FC	27	(1)
- * Club domestic league appearances and goals

Björn Morgan Enqvist (born 12 October 1977 in Lund, Sweden) is a Swedish footballer who last played for Aris Limassol FC in Cyprus.

== Club career ==
=== Early life ===
Enqvist is a centre midfielder from the academy of Malmö FF, where he started his career as a 10-year-old playing in a youth team of boys born 1977. The team won two Swedish championships for under-16s. Both the national league for U16 and the National indoor 5-a-side championship. They also competed successfully in many European tournaments and the youth team produced five professional players for the senior team of Malmö FF, including Enqvist.

=== England ===
On 10 February 1995, Enqvist moved to the Premier League (at the age of 17) with Crystal Palace. He spent two years playing for the club mostly in the reserves but also reaching the FA Youth Cup semi-final against Liverpool where he scored a memorable volley.

=== Scandinavia ===
Enqvist transferred back to Malmö FF in January 1997 under Dutch coach Frans Thijssen. In his two years in the senior squad of Malmö FF he was an important player when the team finished third in the league 1997, and also influential in 1998 where the team also took part in the UEFA Cup where they for the second year running played against Croatian side Hajduk Split.

In 1999 Enqvist transferred to VPS Vaasa in Finland where he in two years playing for the club managed to win two league cup titles and again took part in the UEFA Cup playing against Scottish side St johnstone. In January 2000 he signed for Swedish side GAIS where he played two years.

Enqvist caught the eye of several European clubs and were invited to train with West Ham United who he was close to transfer to.

=== Greece ===
Enqvist arrived in Greece on 3 January signing for Athens-based Apollon Athens. He then moved on to sign for Panahaiki in July 2004 where he enjoyed playing under coach Ivan Jovanovic. He also played for Kastoria in Northern Greece for one year under coach Gjoko Hadzievski. In Greece Enqvist played close to 90 games in B-Ethniki scoring 13 times as a defensive playmaker. In 2009 Enqvist returned to Greece after playing in Cyprus and signed for Veria FC, where he after a successful season won the league and promotion to the 2nd division.

=== Cyprus ===
Björns career continued in Cyprus when on 7 January he signed for Nea Salamina.

In July 2007 Enqvist transferred within Cyprus and signed for APEP Pitsilia, for whom he has enjoyed two successful seasons. His first season saw him guide the team to promotion to the Cypriot top league playing as a defensive playmaker. This team made history as the first APEP side ever, who managed to avoid relegation in the top league. In June 2010 Enqvist signed a contract with Aris Limassol FC in the 2nd division where he again secured the league title and promotion to the top league.

== International career ==
Enqvist was capped for Sweden on all levels from u-16 to u-21, representing his country (Sweden). Captaining the u-18 side and taking part in Sweden's U-21 European qualifiers against England and was also capped against France and Spain.
