= Jörgen Pettersson (footballer) =

Swedish footballer (born 1975)

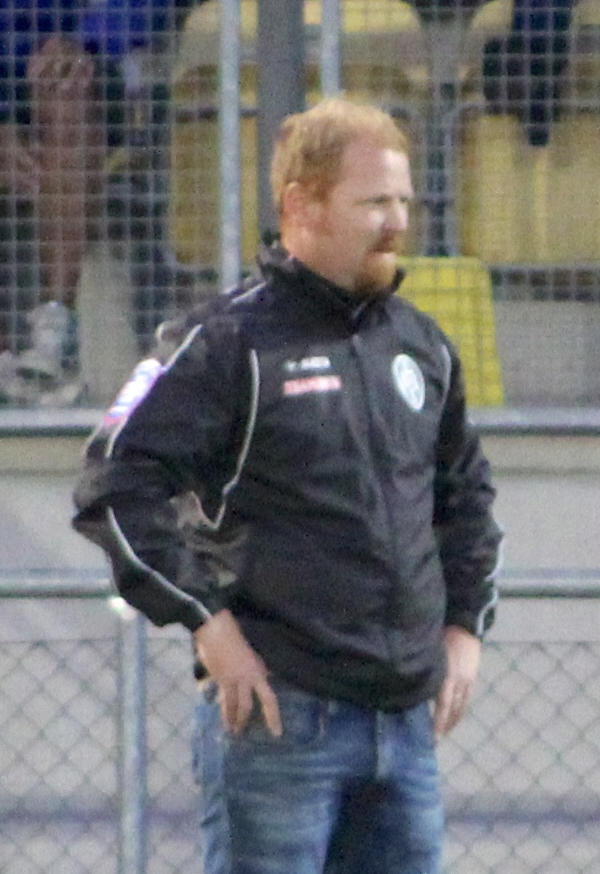
- Pettersson as coach of Landskrona BoIS

Personal information
- Full name: Jörgen Ola Pettersson
- Date of birth: 29 September 1975 (age 51)
- Place of birth: Lackalänga, Sweden
- Height: 1.79 m (5 ft 10 in)
- Position: Striker

Youth career
- Dösjöbro IF
- Kävlinge GIF

Senior career*
Years	Team	Apps	(Gls)
1991–1995	Malmö FF	60	(32)
1995–1999	Borussia Mönchengladbach	144	(32)
1999–2002	1. FC Kaiserslautern	67	(15)
2002–2004	F.C. Copenhagen	32	(6)
2004–2008	Landskrona BoIS	91	(23)
Total		394	(108)

International career
1991–1992	Sweden U17	12	(2)
1994–1995	Sweden U19	14	(9)
1993–1998	Sweden U21	4	(3)
1995–2002	Sweden	27	(8)

Managerial career
- 2009–2010: Landskrona BoIS (individual coach)
- 2012: Malmö FF (assistant manager)
- 2013–2014: Landskrona BoIS
- 2015–2016: Högaborgs BK
- 2017: Teckomatorps SK
- 2018–: IF Lödde (assistant)
- * Club domestic league appearances and goals

Jörgen Ola Pettersson (born 29 September 1975) is a Swedish former professional footballer who played as a striker. He started his career with Malmö FF in 1991 and later played for Borussia Mönchengladbach, 1. FC Kaiserslautern and Copenhagen before retiring at Landskrona BoIS in 2008. He also represented the Sweden national team between 1995 and 2002, earning 27 caps and scoring 8 goals and he was a part of Sweden's UEFA Euro 2000 squad.

== Club career ==
Pettersson started his career in Dösjöbro IF and later played for Kävlinge GIF. In 1991 he signed for Malmö FF and in 1995 he moved to Borussia Mönchengladbach despite being close to Inter Milan after negotiations with its owner Massimo Moratti who offered 1.5 million dollars to Malmo. He also played for 1. FC Kaiserslautern, FC København and Landskrona BoIS in his home country. In February 2009, Pettersson retired from the professional football and has been playing for the Swedish Division 4 club Häljarps IF since May 2009.

== International career ==
=== Youth ===
He represented the Sweden U17, U19, and U21 teams, was a part of the Sweden U21 team that finished sixth at the 1998 UEFA European Under-21 Championship.

=== Senior ===
Pettersson made his senior debut for Sweden on 16 August 1995 in a friendly game against the USA. He scored his first international goal two months later, in a friendly game against Scotland on 11 October 1995. He made his competitive debut for Sweden on 15 November 1995 against Turkey in a UEFA Euro 1996 qualifier, scoring a goal in a 2–2 draw. Two years later, Pettersson represented Sweden at UEFA Euro 2000, appearing in the group stage games against Belgium and Turkey as Sweden failed to advance from their group.

Pettersson made his last international appearance on 16 October 2002, scoring a goal as Sweden lost 3–2 to Portugal in a friendly. In total, he won 27 caps for Sweden, scoring 8 goals.

== Coaching career ==
Pettersson was appointed as one of the three new assistant managers at Malmö FF on 29 October 2011 ahead of the 2012 season along with Daniel Andersson and Simon Hollyhead. On 16 November 2012, Pettersson was appointed manager in Superettan club Landskrona BoIS, replacing Henrik Larsson.

== Personal life ==
Pettersson's career was marred by a 2001 accident on the A63 Autobahn near Wörrstadt when his Mercedes crashed into a Ford Ka that had spun out after rear-ending a truck. The Ka's 20-year-old driver instantly died upon impact with Pettersson's car.

== Career statistics ==
Appearances and goals by national team and year
National team	Year	Apps	Goals
Sweden	1995	3	2
Sweden	1996	2	0
Sweden	1997	4	0
Sweden	1998	6	3
Sweden	1999	5	0
Sweden	2000	6	2
Sweden	2001	0	0
Sweden	2002	1	1
!Total		27	8

Scores and results list Sweden's goal tally first, score column indicates score after each Pettersson goal.

List of international goals scored by Jörgen Pettersson
No.	Date	Venue	Opponent	Score	Result	Competition
1	11 October 1995	Råsunda Stadium, Solna, Sweden	Scotland	1–0	2–0	Friendly
2	15 November 1995	Råsunda Stadium, Solna, Sweden	Turkey	2–1	2–2	UEFA Euro 1996 qualifier
3	28 May 1998	Malmö Stadium, Malmö, Sweden	Denmark	2–0	3–0	Friendly
4	28 May 1998	Malmö Stadium, Malmö, Sweden	Denmark	3–0	3–0	Friendly
5	19 August 1998	Eyravallen, Örebro, Sweden	Russia	1–0	1–0	Friendly
6	29 March 2000	Arnold Schwarzenegger Stadium, Graz, Austria	Austria	1–1	1–1	Friendly
7	26 April 2000	Parken Stadium, Copenhagen, Denmark	Denmark	1–0	1–0	Friendly
8	16 October 2002	Ullevi, Gothenburg, Sweden	Portugal	1–0	2–3	Friendly
