= Mathias Gravem =

Norwegian-Swedish footballer (born 1976)

Mathias Gravem (born 15 March 1976) is a Norwegian-Swedish former professional footballer who played as a forward for IFK Norrköping, GAIS, Ljungskile SK and Qviding FIF. Because of his notorious goal-scoring, Gravem became a legend in GAIS where he played between 2001 and 2006. He scored 58 goals in 104 matches in total for GAIS. Gravem got the nickname "Messias Gravem" after the first few games where he scored many goals, notably four in the same match against IFK Malmö in 2001. In 2003, he was injured but came on as a substitute with ten minutes left, scored a goal to secure advancement to Superettan for GAIS, and was then substituted off again. ”Messias” and Ville Viljanen formed a notorious striker partnership for many years, after GAIS got their hands on the at the time Finland international. When the club could not afford him in 2003, supporters crowdsourced money (225.000 Swedish crowns) to retain him.
