= Peter Hillgren =

Swedish footballer

Peter Hillgren (AKA Hulda)
Personal information
- Full name: Peter Hillgren
- Date of birth: 15 March 1966 (age 60)
- Position: Forward

Youth career
- BK Olympic

Senior career*
Years	Team	Apps	(Gls)
1989–1994	Malmö FF	41	(8)
- * Club domestic league appearances and goals

Peter Hillgren (born 15 March 1966) is a Swedish former footballer who played as a forward.
