= 2001 in Swedish football =

The 2001 season in Swedish football, starting January 2001 and ending December 2001:

== Honours ==
=== Official titles ===
Title	Team	Reason
Swedish Champions 2001	Hammarby IF	Winners of Allsvenskan
Swedish Cup Champions 2000–01	IF Elfsborg	Winners of Svenska Cupen

=== Competitions ===
Level	Competition	Team
1st level	Allsvenskan 2001	Hammarby IF
2nd level	Superettan 2001	Kalmar FF
Cup	Svenska Cupen 2000–01	IF Elfsborg

== Promotions, relegations and qualifications ==
=== Promotions ===
Promoted from	Promoted to	Team	Reason
Superettan 2001	Allsvenskan 2002	Kalmar FF	Winners
Superettan 2001	Allsvenskan 2002	Landskrona BoIS	2nd team
Division 2 2001	Superettan 2002	IF Brommapojkarna	Winners of promotion play-off
Division 2 2001	Superettan 2002	Åtvidabergs FF	Winners of promotion play-off
Division 2 2001	Superettan 2002	Ängelholms FF	Winners of promotion play-off

=== Relegations ===
Relegated from	Relegated to	Team	Reason
Allsvenskan 2001	Superettan 2002	BK Häcken	13th team
Allsvenskan 2001	Superettan 2002	Trelleborgs FF	14th team
Superettan 2001	Division 2 2002	GAIS	14th team
Superettan 2001	Division 2 2002	Umeå FC	15th team
Superettan 2001	Division 2 2002	Motala AIF	16th team

=== International qualifications ===
Qualified for	Enters	Team	Reason
UEFA Champions League 2002–03	2nd qualifying round	Hammarby IF	Winners of Allsvenskan
UEFA Cup 2002–03	Qualifying round	Djurgårdens IF	2nd team in Allsvenskan
UEFA Cup 2002–03	Qualifying round	AIK	3rd team in Allsvenskan
UEFA Cup 2002–03	Qualifying round	IFK Göteborg	4th team in Allsvenskan
UEFA Intertoto Cup 2002	1st round	Helsingborgs IF	5th team in Allsvenskan

== Domestic results ==
=== Allsvenskan ===
Pos	Team	Pld	W	D	L	GF	GA	GD	Pts	Qualification or relegation
1	Hammarby IF (C)	26	14	6	6	45	28	+17	48	Qualification to Champions League second qualifying round
2	Djurgårdens IF	26	13	8	5	36	24	+12	47	Qualification to UEFA Cup qualifying round
3	AIK	26	12	9	5	45	29	+16	45	Qualification to UEFA Cup qualifying round
4	IFK Göteborg	26	12	8	6	41	31	+10	44	Qualification to UEFA Cup qualifying round
5	Helsingborgs IF	26	11	9	6	47	29	+18	42	Qualification to Intertoto Cup first round
6	Örgryte IS	26	10	9	7	36	33	+3	39	
7	Halmstads BK	26	10	8	8	50	31	+19	38	
8	Örebro SK	26	8	9	9	48	44	+4	33	
9	Malmö FF	26	9	5	12	39	46	−7	32	
10	IF Elfsborg	26	9	3	14	31	51	−20	30	
11	GIF Sundsvall	26	7	8	11	28	37	−9	29	
12	IFK Norrköping (O)	26	7	8	11	29	40	−11	29	Qualification to Relegation play-offs
13	BK Häcken (R)	26	5	9	12	35	50	−15	24	Relegation to Superettan
14	Trelleborgs FF (R)	26	3	5	18	25	62	−37	14	Relegation to Superettan

Source: svenskfotboll.se (in Swedish)
Rules for classification: 1) points; 2) goal difference; 3) number of goals scored.
(C) Champions; (O) Play-off winners; (R) Relegated

=== 2001 Allsvenskan qualification play-off ===
October 31, 2001

Mjällby AIF	2–1	IFK Norrköping

Strandvallen, Mjällby
November 3, 2001

IFK Norrköping	3–1	Mjällby AIF

Idrottsparken, Norrköping

=== Superettan ===
Pos	Team	Pld	W	D	L	GF	GA	GD	Pts	Promotion, qualification or relegation
1	Kalmar FF (C, P)	30	21	6	3	68	19	+49	69	Promotion to Allsvenskan
2	Landskrona BoIS (P)	30	20	5	5	60	26	+34	65	Promotion to Allsvenskan
3	Mjällby AIF	30	17	7	6	57	33	+24	58	Qualification to Promotion playoffs
4	Gefle IF	30	17	6	7	51	32	+19	57	
5	Café Opera United	30	12	10	8	55	52	+3	46	
6	Västerås SK	30	12	5	13	46	51	−5	41	
7	IF Sylvia	30	11	6	13	56	53	+3	39	
8	Enköpings SK	30	10	9	11	40	41	−1	39	
9	Västra Frölunda	30	9	10	11	42	42	0	37	
10	IK Brage	30	11	4	15	46	56	−10	37	
11	IFK Malmö	30	8	12	10	39	49	−10	36	
12	Östers IF	30	10	5	15	41	55	−14	35	
13	Assyriska FF	30	8	9	13	32	35	−3	33	
14	GAIS (R)	30	8	9	13	31	47	−16	33	Relegation to Division 2
15	Umeå FC (R)	30	6	3	21	36	63	−27	21	Relegation to Division 2
16	Motala AIF (R)	30	3	8	19	30	76	−46	17	Relegation to Division 2

Source: svenskfotboll.se (in Swedish)
Rules for classification: 1) points; 2) goal difference; 3) number of goals scored.
(C) Champions; (P) Promoted; (R) Relegated

=== 2000–01 Svenska Cupen ===
Final

May 25, 2001

AIK	1–1 1–1 (aet) 9–10 (apen)	IF Elfsborg

Stadsparksvallen, Jönköping
