= Mikael Blomberg =

Swedish footballer

Personal information
- Date of birth: 23 October 1974 (age 52)
- Place of birth: Nyköping, Sweden
- Height: 1.75 m (5 ft 9 in)
- Position: Midfielder

Senior career*
| Years | Team | Apps | (Gls) |
| 1994–2004 | IFK Norrköping | | |
| 2005–2006 | Kalmar FF | | |
| 2007–2009 | IFK Norrköping | | |
- * Club domestic league appearances and goals

Mikael Blomberg (born 23 October 1974) is a Swedish former professional footballer who played as a midfielder. (Note: Mikael Blomberg at WorldFootball.net)

He has played for IFK Norrköping and Kalmar FF. After his retirement from top-tier football, he played for Lindö FF and Hargs BK.
