= Marcus Vaapil =

Swedish footballer

Personal information
- Full name: Marcus Vaapil
- Date of birth: 24 August 1977 (age 49)
- Height: 1.76 m (5 ft 9 in)
- Position: Right-back

Team information
- Current team: IK Vista (manager)

Youth career
- 1984–1995: Malmö FF

Senior career*
Years	Team	Apps	(Gls)
1996–2000	Malmö FF	19	(0)
2001–2002	IK Tord		
2003	Husqvarna FF		
2004	IK Tord		
2005–2009	Tenhults IF		

International career
1994	Sweden U17	2	(0)
1995	Sweden U18	7	(1)
1997–1999	Sweden U21	12	(0)

Managerial career
- 2009: Tenhults IF (assistant)
- 2010: Tenhults IF
- 2011–2014: Ölmstads IS
- 2015–2021: IK Tord
- 2022-: IK Vista
- * Club domestic league appearances and goals

Marcus Vaapil (born 24 August 1977) is a Swedish former footballer who played as a right-back. He is now manager for the division 3 club IK Vista from Kaxholmen.
