= Jens Nordström =

Swedish footballer (born 1976)

Personal information
- Full name: Jens Nordström
- Date of birth: 12 September 1976 (age 50)
- Position: Defender

Team information
- Current team: FC Rosengård

Senior career*
Years	Team	Apps	(Gls)
1999–2000	Malmö FF	25	(1)
2001–2002	IFK Malmö	38	(2)
2003–2008	IF Limhamn Bunkeflo		
2009–2010	IFK Klagshamn		
2010	Landskrona BoIS	8	(2)
2011–	FC Rosengård		
- * Club domestic league appearances and goals

Jens Nordström (born 12 September 1976) is a Swedish footballer who plays as a defender.
