= Robert Kjellin =

Swedish footballer

Personal information
- Full name: Lennart Robert Kjellin
- Date of birth: 11 March 1973 (age 53)
- Place of birth: Örebro, Sweden
- Position: Defender

Senior career*
Years	Team	Apps	(Gls)
2001	Malmö FF	8	(0)
- * Club domestic league appearances and goals

Robert Kjellin (born 11 March 1973) is a Swedish former footballer who played as a defender.
