= Ola Tidman =

Swedish footballer (born 1979)

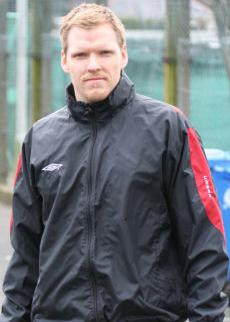
- Tidman with Derry City in 2007

Personal information
- Full name: Karl Ola Tidman
- Date of birth: 11 May 1979 (age 47)
- Place of birth: Malmö, Sweden
- Height: 6 ft 3 in (1.91 m)
- Position: Goalkeeper

Youth career
- 1996–1998: BK Kick

Senior career*
| Years | Team | Apps | (Gls) |
| 1998–2000 | Malmö FF | 21 | (0) |
| 2000–2001 | AA Gent | 0 | (0) |
| 2001–2002 | La Louvière | 6 | (0) |
| 2002–2003 | Stockport County | 18 | (0) |
| 2003–2005 | Sheffield Wednesday | 13 | (0) |
| 2005–2007 | FC Midtjylland | 20 | (0) |
| 2007–2008 | Derry City | 1 | (0) |
| 2008 | → Kongsvinger IL (loan) | 3 | (0) |
| 2008–2009 | Akademisk Boldklub | 6 | (0) |
| 2009–2011 | IF Limhamn Bunkeflo | 0 | (0) |
| Total | | 88 | (0) |

International career
| 1997 | Sweden U19 | 7 | (0) |
| 2000–2001 | Sweden U21 | 2 | (0) |
- * Club domestic league appearances and goals

Karl Ola Tidman (born 11 May 1979) is a Swedish former professional footballer who played as a goalkeeper.

== Club career ==
Tidman's past clubs have included BK Kick, Malmö FF, KAA Gent, RAA La Louvière, Stockport County, Sheffield Wednesday and FC Midtjylland. In early 2007 he spent a period on trial with Derry City, before impressing Pat Fenlon and being offered a two-year contract. In an inauspicious debut for City, Tidman conceded four goals as Derry City fell to a 4–1 home league defeat to Cork City on 9 April 2007.

In October 2008 he moved back to Denmark to play for Akademisk Boldklub of the Danish Viasat Sport Divisionen and signed on 15 April 2009 with IF Limhamn Bunkeflo.

== International career ==
Tidman has represented Sweden at under-18 and under-21 levels.
