= Kenneth Gustafsson (footballer, born 1982) =

Swedish footballer (born 1982)

Personal information
- Full name: Kenneth Ingemar Gustafsson
- Date of birth: 19 August 1982 (age 44)
- Place of birth: Bergsjön, Göteborg, Sweden
- Height: 1.94 m (6 ft 4 in)
- Position: Central defender

Youth career
- –1998: Kortedala IF
- 1998–1999: Malmö FF

Senior career*
Years	Team	Apps	(Gls)
2000–2002	Malmö FF	14	(2)
2001	FC Lyn Oslo	3	(0)
2003–2004	Trelleborgs FF	37	(2)
2005	IFK Malmö	11	(5)
2005–2008	Keflavik FC	50	(4)
2009	IFK Mariehamn	23	(2)
2010	Gunnilse IS	20	(6)

International career^{‡}
1997–1999	Sweden U-17	12	(1)
- * Club domestic league appearances and goals as of 12 October 2009 ‡ National team caps and goals as of 11 April 2008

Kenneth Gustafsson is a Swedish footballer who last played for Swedish side Gunnilse IS in the Swedish second division, which is the 4th highest in Sweden. He has earlier represented clubs in the top leagues in Sweden, Norway, Finland and Iceland.
