= Goran Trpevski =

Swedish footballer

Personal information
- Full name: Goran Trpevski
- Date of birth: 2 March 1977 (age 49)
- Place of birth: Malmö, Sweden
- Height: 1.76 m (5 ft 9 1/2 in)
- Position: Attacking midfielder

Youth career
- –1995: Malmö FF

Senior career*
Years	Team	Apps	(Gls)
1995–1998	Malmö FF		
1998–2005	Apollon Athens		

International career
- Sweden U16
- Sweden U18
- Sweden U20
	Sweden U21	1	(0)
- * Club domestic league appearances and goals

Goran Trpevski (born 2 March 1977) is a Swedish former football player from Macedonian origin.

== External sources ==
- Goran Trpevski Football Tips Site.
