= Per Gawelin =

Swedish footballer

Personal information
- Full name: Per Göran Gavelin
- Date of birth: 24 January 1978 (age 48)
- Position: Midfielder

Senior career*
Years	Team	Apps	(Gls)
1996–2004	Örebro SK	112	(15)

International career
1993–1994	Sweden U17	14	(4)
1995	Sweden U19	5	(0)
1997–1998	Sweden U21	4	(1)
2001	Sweden	1	(0)
- * Club domestic league appearances and goals

Per Gawelin (born 24 January 1978) is a Swedish former professional footballer who played as a midfielder.
