= Jens Fjellström =

Swedish footballer (born 1966)

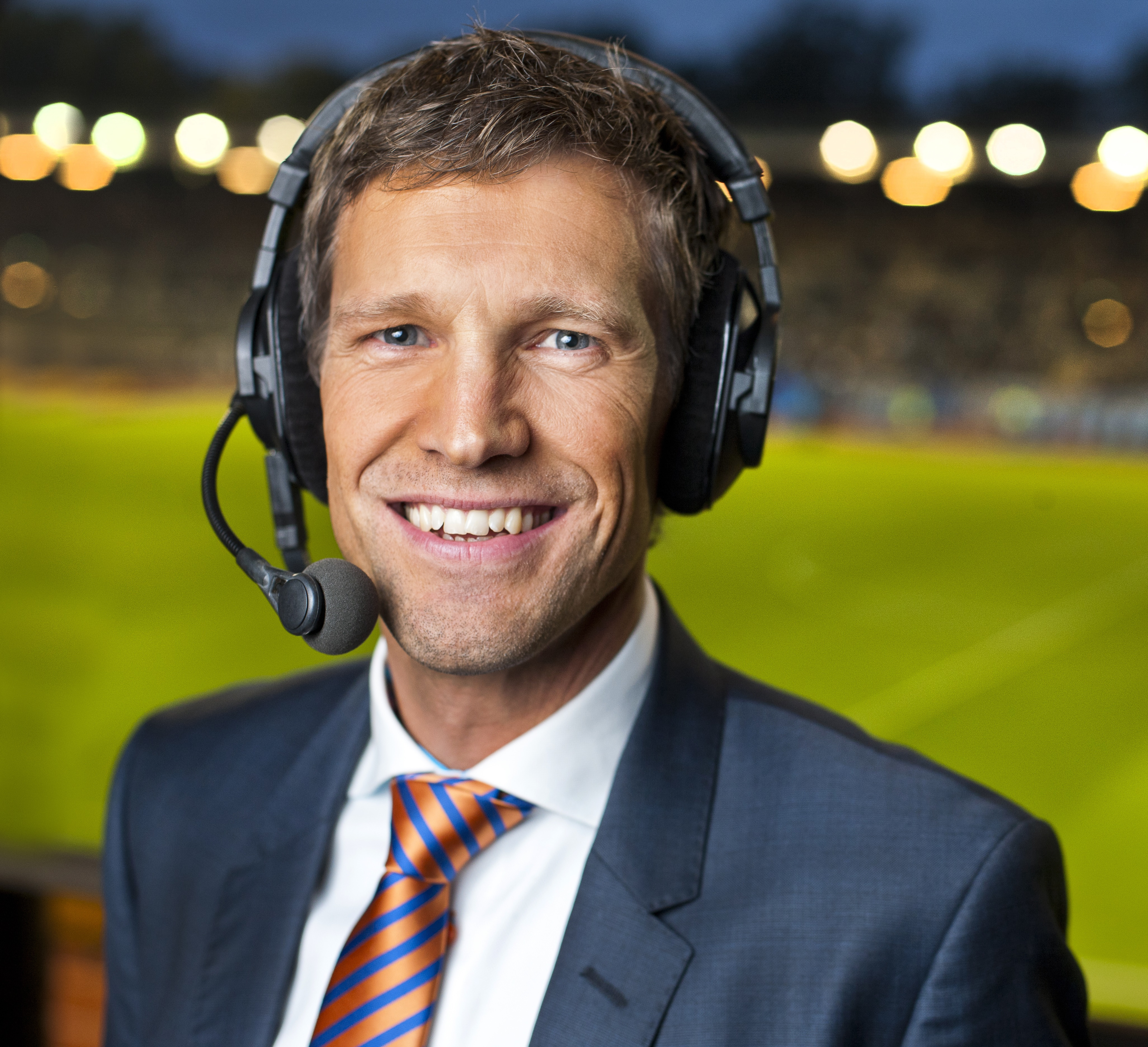

Personal information
- Full name: Jens Åke Alexander Fjellström
- Date of birth: 27 October 1966 (age 60)
- Place of birth: Umeå, Sweden
- Position: Midfielder

Team information
- Current team: Australia Women (Assistant)

Senior career*
Years	Team	Apps	(Gls)
–1988	Gimonäs CK		
1988–1992	Djurgårdens IF	115	(23)
1993–1997	Malmö FF	98	(19)
1997–1998	→ Dalian Wanda (loan)	44	(6)
1999–2000	Malmö FF	21	(0)

International career
1990–1992	Sweden	3	(1)

Managerial career
- 2016–2019: Malmö FF (Assistant)
- 2022–: Australia Women (Assistant)
- * Club domestic league appearances and goals

Jens Åke Alexander Fjellström (born 27 October 1966) is a Swedish professional football manager and sports commentator. He is also a former professional player. He is currently an assistant coach for the Australia women's national soccer team.

== Career ==
=== Club career ===
Fjellström started his career at local Umeå club Gimonäs CK. After the bigger clubs noticed his skills he moved to Stockholm and Djurgårdens IF. He remained at Djurgården for five seasons before moving to Malmö FF. He enjoyed much success at the club and went on a loan to Dalian Wanda in China before playing a final season in Malmö. Fjellström decided to end his career after a knee injury had made him miss a season after which he thought that he couldn't perform at the same level as before his injury.

=== International career ===
Fjellström won a total of three caps for the Sweden national team. On his international debut he scored his first and only international goal. This was in a friendly match against Norway on 22 August 1990.

=== Media and Coaching ===
After retiring, Fjellström worked 15 years as a football expert on Swedish TV-channel TV4. He didn't extend his contract with the channel and instead on 26 July 2016, he was appointed as assistant manager of Malmö FF. He left the position on 21 January 2019.

In March 2019, he announced that he was going to work for the Denmark national team as a scout for manager Åge Hareide.

In 2022 he was appointed as an assistant coach of the Australian women's national soccer team.
