= Tony Flygare =

Swedish footballer

Personal information
- Full name: Tony Alexander Flygare
- Date of birth: 6 January 1981 (age 45)
- Place of birth: Malmö, Sweden
- Height: 1.88 m (6 ft 2 in)
- Position: Forward

Youth career
- Malmö FF

Senior career*
Years	Team	Apps	(Gls)
1999–2001	Malmö FF	7	(0)
2001	→ Luleå FF (loan)		
2002	Assyriska FF	17	(2)
2002–2003	Wehen Wiesbaden	3	(0)
2004	Bunkeflo IF		
2005–2006	Cementarnica 55		
2006	Malmö Anadolu BI		
2007	Husie IF		
2007–2008	KSF Prespa Birlik		
2008	BW 90 IF		

International career
1997–1998	Sweden U17	26	(15)
1999	Sweden U19	4	(2)
- * Club domestic league appearances and goals

Tony Alexander Flygare (born 6 January 1981) is a Swedish former footballer who played as a forward.

== Club career ==
He started off his career with Malmö FF, playing alongside Zlatan Ibrahimović in both the youth as well as senior teams. During his career he also played abroad, first with SV Wehen Wiesbaden in the 2002–03 Regionalliga Süd, and then with FK Cementarnica 55 in the 2005–06 First Macedonian Football League.

== International career ==
He made a total of 30 appearances for the Sweden U17 and U19 teams, scoring 17 goals.
