= Johan Laursen =

Swedish footballer

Personal information
- Date of birth: 30 June 1980 (age 46)
- Position: Midfielder

Senior career*
| Years | Team | Apps | (Gls) |
| 2000 | Malmö FF | 2 | (0) |
| 2002?–2004 | Trelleborgs FF | | |
- * Club domestic league appearances and goals

Johan Laursen (born 30 June 1980) is a Swedish former footballer who played as a midfielder.
