= Gezim Osmani =

Swedish footballer

Personal information
- Date of birth: 1 January 1980 (age 45)
- Position: Midfielder

Senior career*
| Years | Team | Apps | (Gls) |
| -2000 | Malmö FF | 3 | (0) |
- FC Rosengård 1917
- KSF Prespa Birlik
- Türk Anadolu FF
- * Club domestic league appearances and goals

Gezim Osmani (born 1 January 1980) is a Swedish retired footballer.

== Career ==
After playing for Malmö FF, the most successful team in Sweden, Osmani played in all levels of Swedish football from the top flight to the eighth division.
