= Brune Tavell =

Swedish footballer

Personal information
- Full name: Brune Tavell
- Date of birth: 29 April 1974 (age 52)
- Place of birth: Sweden
- Position: Midfielder

Youth career
- Veberöds AIF

Senior career*
Years	Team	Apps	(Gls)
1997–2000	Malmö FF	72	(3)
- Kalmar FF
- Ystads IF
- Åkarps IF
- Värtans IK
- Karlbergs BK
- FC Andrea Doria
- * Club domestic league appearances and goals

Brune Tavell (born 29 April 1974) is a Swedish footballer who plays as a midfielder for Swedish club FC Andrea Doria.
