= Johan Paulsson (footballer) =

Swedish footballer

Personal information
- Full name: Lars Johan Paulsson
- Date of birth: 28 December 1970 (age 55)
- Position: Forward

Senior career*
Years	Team	Apps	(Gls)
–1999	Kalmar FF		
2000–2001	Örebro SK		
2002–2003	Bryne FK	25	(1)
- * Club domestic league appearances and goals

Lars Johan Paulsson (born 28 December 1970) is a Swedish former football striker.
