= Mike Owusu (footballer, born 1977) =

Ghanaian-born Swedish footballer

Personal information
- Full name: Mike Owusu
- Date of birth: 1 January 1977 (age 49)
- Place of birth: Kumasi, Ghana
- Height: 1.78 m (5 ft 10 in)
- Position: Defender

Youth career
- Kirseberg IF

Senior career*
Years	Team	Apps	(Gls)
–1996	Kirseberg IF		
1996–1999	Malmö FF	13	(1)
1999–2001	Örgryte IS		
2002–2003	N.E.C.		
2003–2004	Trelleborgs FF		
2005–2006	Nykøbing FC		
2006–2007	Bunkeflo IF		
2007	Sjöbo IF		
2008-?	Höörs IS		

International career
1992–1993	Sweden U17	10	(0)
1994	Sweden U19	8	(0)
1998–1999	Sweden U21	3	(0)
- * Club domestic league appearances and goals

Mike Owusu (born 1 January 1977) is a Ghanaian-born Swedish former footballer who played as a defender.

Playing professionally in Sweden, the Netherlands, and Denmark, Owusu represented the Sweden U17, U19, and U21 teams internationally.
