= Lennart Hansson (footballer) =

Swedish footballer

Personal information
- Full name: Lennart Hansson
- Position: Midfielder

Senior career*
Years	Team	Apps	(Gls)
1959–1960	Malmö FF	18	(7)
- * Club domestic league appearances and goals

Lennart Hansson is a Swedish former footballer who played as a midfielder.
