= Björn Stringheim =

Swedish footballer

Personal information
- Date of birth: 20 August 1975 (age 51)
- Place of birth: Malmö, Sweden
- Height: 1.91 m (6 ft 3 in)
- Position: Goalkeeper

Senior career*
Years	Team	Apps	(Gls)
1994	Malmö FF	1	(0)
1998–2000	VPS	44	(0)
- * Club domestic league appearances and goals

Björn Stringheim is a Swedish former football player who played as a goalkeeper.
