= Thomas Andersson (footballer, born 1968) =

Swedish footballer

Personal information
- Full name: Thomas Per Andersson
- Date of birth: 3 September 1968 (age 58)
- Position: Defender

Senior career*
Years	Team	Apps	(Gls)
1988–2006	Örebro SK		
- * Club domestic league appearances and goals

Thomas Andersson (born 3 September 1968) is a Swedish retired football defender.
