= Jörgen Persson (footballer) =

Swedish footballer

Personal information
- Full name: Jörgen Persson
- Date of birth: 3 April 1969
- Position: Forward

Youth career
- BK Olympic

Senior career*
Years	Team	Apps	(Gls)
1989	Malmö FF	2	(0)
- * Club domestic league appearances and goals

Jörgen Persson (born 3 April 1969) is a Swedish former footballer who played two games in Allsvenskan for Malmö FF in 1989. He later played for Helsingborgs IF and IFK Malmö in the second division and for smaller clubs in Skåne.
