= Lennart Fridh =

Swedish footballer

Personal information
- Full name: Jan Ove Lennart Fridh
- Date of birth: 22 May 1970 (age 56)
- Position: Midfielder

Senior career*
| Years | Team | Apps | (Gls) |
| 1989 | Malmö FF | 1 | (0) |
| 1991 | SK Brann | 20 | (1) |
- * Club domestic league appearances and goals

Lennart Fridh (born 22 May 1970) is a Swedish former footballer who played as a midfielder. In 1991, Fridh played for Norwegian side SK Brann.
