= Niclas Kindvall =

Swedish footballer

Personal information
- Full name: Bengt Niclas Kindvall
- Date of birth: 19 February 1967 (age 59)
- Place of birth: Rotterdam, Netherlands
- Position: Striker

Youth career
- 1973: Hagahöjdens BK
- 1974–1982: Hovås IF
- 1983–1986: Älvsjö AIK

Senior career*
Years	Team	Apps	(Gls)
1987–1990	AIK	76	(13)
1991–1994	IFK Norrköping	69	(33)
1994–1996	Hamburger SV	19	(2)
1997–2000	Malmö FF	83	(23)
Total		247	(71)

International career
1987	Sweden U21	1	(0)
1992–1994	Sweden	6	(0)
- * Club domestic league appearances and goals

Bengt Niclas Kindvall (born 19 February 1967) is a former professional footballer who played as a striker. Born in the Netherlands, he played for the Sweden national team.

== Career ==
Kindvall was the 1994 Allsvenskan top scorer with IFK Norrköping, which won him a contract with Hamburger SV in the German Bundesliga. A full international between 1992 and 1994, Kindvall won six caps for the Sweden national team.

== Personal life ==
He is the son of Ove Kindvall and brother of Tina Kindvall.

== Honours ==
Individual

- Allsvenskan top scorer: 1994 (23 goals)
