= Jonas Wirmola =

Swedish footballer, manager, and agent

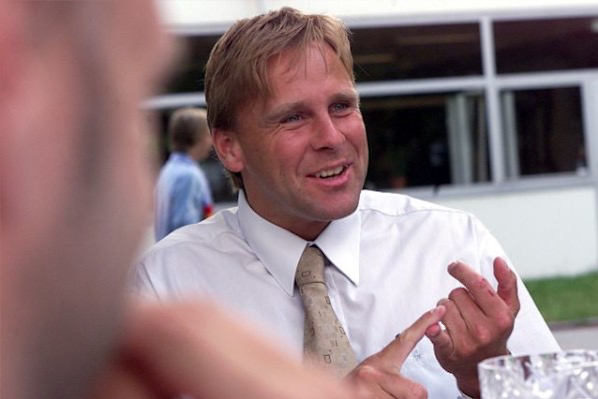
- Jonas Wirmola at a private gathering July, 2018.

Personal information
- Full name: Jonas Fredrik Wirmola
- Date of birth: 17 July 1969 (age 57)
- Place of birth: Växjö, Sweden
- Height: 1.91 m (6 ft 3 in)
- Position: Centre-back

Youth career
- 1986: Växjö BK

Senior career*
Years	Team	Apps	(Gls)
1987–1988	Kalmar FF	0	(0)
1988–1989	Väckelsångs IK		
1990	Vederslöv/Dänningelanda IF		
1990	Spårvägens FF	6	(1)
1991	Öster	1	(1)
1992–1993	Spårvägens FF	39	(3)
1993–1994	Sheffield United	8	(0)
1994–2000	Malmö FF	147	(3)
1997	→ Dundee United (loan)	3	(0)
1997	→ Skeid (loan)	13	(2)
2001	IFK Malmö	17	(1)
2003	Högaborgs BK	6	(0)
2006	BK Näset/Höllviken		

Managerial career
- 2002: IFK Malmö
- 2003: Höllvikens GIF
- 2004–2005: Högaborgs BK
- 2006: BK Näset/Höllviken
- 2007–2008: Halmstads BK (assistant)
- * Club domestic league appearances and goals

Jonas Fredrik Wirmola (born 17 July 1969) is a Swedish former football defender and manager and currently a player agent.

== Playing career ==
Wirmola started his career at Kalmar FF and played for Väckelsångs IF, Vederslöv/Dänningelanda IF, Spårvägens FF, Öster and Spårvägens FF a second time. In 1993, playing at the second tier of Swedish football, he was bought by Premier League club Sheffield United for £50k. He played only 8 league matches before returning to Sweden in 1994 to play for Malmö FF.

While at Malmö FF, he was loaned twice in 1997 to Scottish club Dundee United and Norwegian Skeid. In 2001, he joined IFK Malmö, his last club as a professional player. After starting his manager his career, he returned as a player twice for Högaborgs BK, a club he would later coach and BK Näset/Höllviken, a club he had been a manager at.

== Retirement ==
Wirmola was appointed as IFK Malmö manager soon after retiring. He coached Höllvikens GIF, Högaborgs BK, BK Näset/Höllviken and was assistant at Halmstads BK, while also working as a pundit in the period. He later became a player agent.

== Personal life ==
Wirmola has Finnish ancestry.
