= Carsten Olausson =

Swedish footballer

Personal information
- Full name: Carsten Olausson
- Position: Goalkeeper

Senior career*
Years	Team	Apps	(Gls)
1993–1994	Malmö FF	9	(0)
- * Club domestic league appearances and goals

Carsten Olausson is a Swedish former footballer who played as a goalkeeper.
