= Richard Oteng Mensah =

Ghanaian footballer

Personal information
- Full name: Richard Oteng Mensah
- Position: Midfielder

Senior career*
Years	Team	Apps	(Gls)
2000–2001	Malmö FF	6	(0)
- * Club domestic league appearances and goals

Richard Oteng Mensah is a Ghanaian former footballer who played as a midfielder. he has played for the Swedish and Dutch team
