= Greger Andrijevski =

Swedish footballer

Personal information
- Full name: Tony Greger Andrijevski
- Date of birth: 29 April 1973 (age 53)
- Place of birth: Landskrona, Sweden
- Position: Forward

Team information
- Current team: Malmö FF (fitness coach and masseur)

Youth career
- 1981–1991: Landskrona BoIS

Senior career*
Years	Team	Apps	(Gls)
1991–1994	Landskrona BoIS		
1995–1998	Malmö FF	21	(5)
1998	→ Landskrona BoIS (loan)		
1999–2001	OB	16	(1)
2001–2002	Trelleborgs FF	23	(9)

International career
1994–1995	Sweden U21	3	(2)
- * Club domestic league appearances and goals

Tony Greger Andrijevski (born 29 April 1973) is a Swedish former footballer who played as a forward. He was purchased by Malmö FF from Landskrona BoIS for the 1995 season. He also represented the Sweden U21 three times, scoring two goals. He was on the bench for an international friendly for the Sweden national team on 8 March 1995, but did not come off the bench as Sweden tied Cyprus 3–3.
