= Jörgen Ohlsson =

Swedish footballer (born 1972)

Personal information
- Date of birth: 10 April 1972 (age 54)
- Place of birth: Malmö, Sweden
- Position: Defender

Youth career
- –1987: Bara
- 1987–1991: Malmö FF

Senior career*
Years	Team	Apps	(Gls)
1991–2003	Malmö FF	266	(34)
1992	→ IFK Trelleborg (loan)	0	(0)
- * Club domestic league appearances and goals

Jörgen Ohlsson (born 10 April 1972 in Malmö) is a Swedish former footballer.

== Career ==
Ohlsson came to Malmö FF from local club Bara at 15 years of age in 1987. To gain experience he was sent on loan to IFK Trelleborg with other young Malmö players. When he returned to Malmö FF in 1992 he took a spot in the startíng eleven and retained that spot for the majority of his playing career. In 2003 Ohlsson ended his career after having severe injury problems. He is the second most capped player in Malmö FF's history not having won a Swedish championship while at the club. Ohlsson could play in many different positions on the field but played the majority of his career as central defender.
