= 1998–99 UEFA Cup =

28th season of Europe's secondary club football tournament organised by UEFA

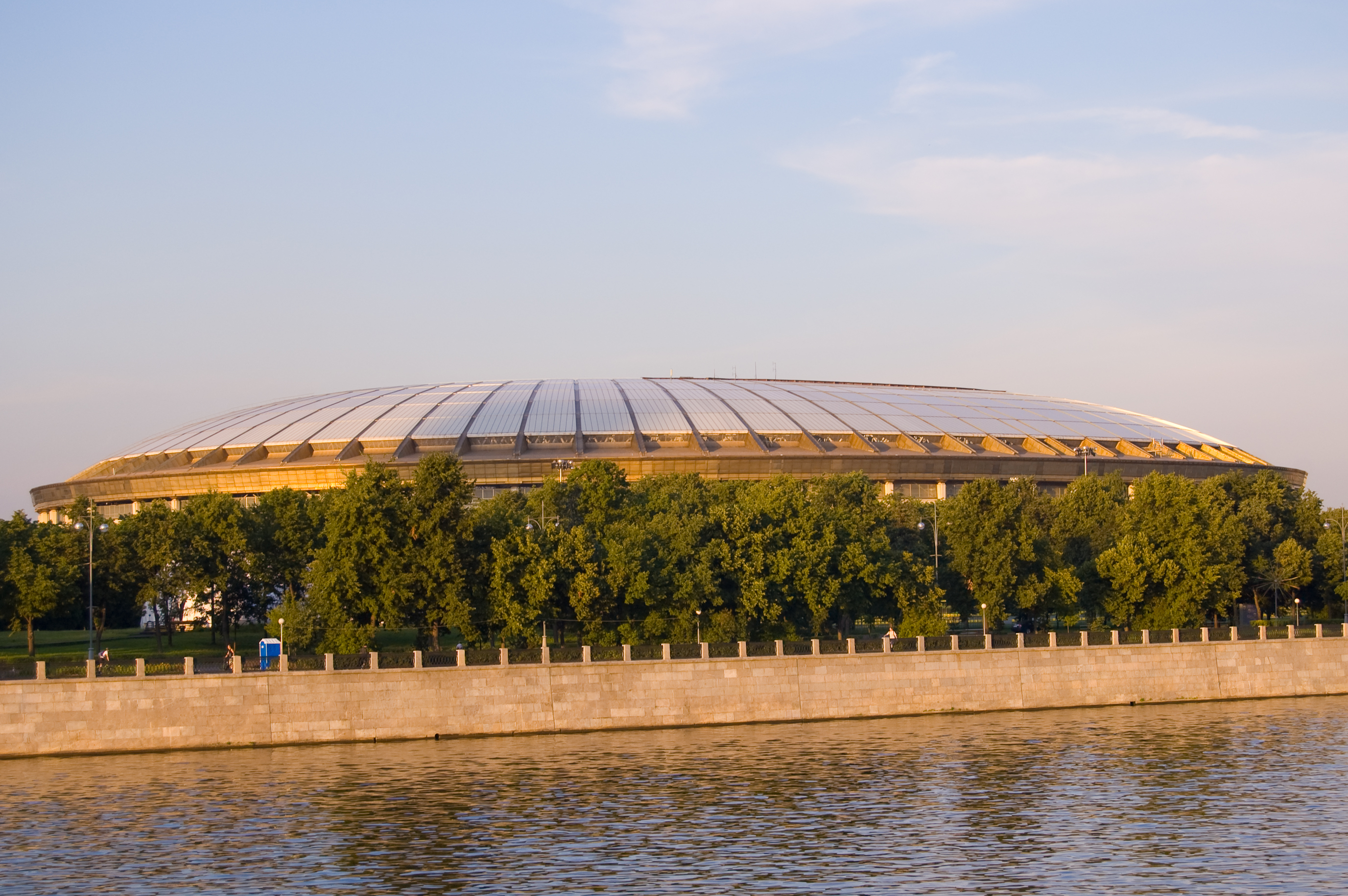
- Luzhniki Stadium hosted the final

Tournament details
- Dates: 22 July 1998 – 12 May 1999
- Teams: 104

Final positions
- Champions: (Italy) Parma (2nd title)
- Runners-up: (France) Marseille

Tournament statistics
- Matches played: 125
- Goals scored: 363 (2.9 per match)
- Attendance: 2,413,695 (19,310 per match)
- Top scorer(s): Enrico Chiesa (Parma); Darko Kovačević (Real Sociedad); 8 goals each

The 1998–99 UEFA Cup was won by Parma in the final against Marseille. It was their second title in the competition.

It was the last edition of the old format UEFA Cup, before the Cup Winners' Cup was merged into it to include domestic cup winners, and an extra knockout round was added. The new format was last played in the 2003–04 season and was later replaced by a Group Stage format in 2004–05.

== Teams ==
The labels in the parentheses show how each team qualified for the place of its starting round:

- TH: Title holders
- LC: League Cup winners
- Nth: League position
- IC: Intertoto Cup winners
- FP: Fair play
- CL Q2: Losers from the Champions League second qualifying round

First round
(Italy) Udinese (3rd)	(France) Lyon (6th)	(Portugal) Sporting CP (4th)	(Cyprus) Anorthosis Famagusta (CL Q2)
(Italy) Roma (4th)	(Germany) Bayer Leverkusen (3rd)	(Portugal) Marítimo (5th)	(Scotland) Celtic (CL Q2)
(Italy) Fiorentina (5th)	(Germany) Stuttgart (4th)	(France) Metz (CL Q2)	(Israel) Beitar Jerusalem (CL Q2)
(Italy) Parma (6th)	(Germany) Schalke 04 (5th)	(Czech Republic) Sparta Prague (CL Q2)	(Slovenia) Maribor (CL Q2)
(Spain) Real Sociedad (3rd)	(Netherlands) Vitesse (3rd)	(Switzerland) Grasshopper (CL Q2)	(Latvia) Skonto (CL Q2)
(Spain) Celta de Vigo (6th)	(Netherlands) Feyenoord (4th)	(Poland) ŁKS Łódź (CL Q2)	(Bulgaria) Litex Lovech (CL Q2)
(Spain) Atlético Madrid (7th)	(Netherlands) Willem II (5th)	(Hungary) Újpest (CL Q2)	(Federal Republic of Yugoslavia) Obilić (CL Q2)
(Spain) Real Betis (8th)	(England) Liverpool (3rd)	(Belgium) Club Brugge (CL Q2)	(Italy) Bologna (IC)
(France) Monaco (3rd)	(England) Leeds United (5th)	(Slovakia) Košice (CL Q2)	(Germany) Werder Bremen (IC)
(France) Marseille (4th)	(England) Blackburn Rovers (6th)	(Romania) Steaua București (CL Q2)	(Spain) Valencia (IC)
(France) Bordeaux (5th)	(Portugal) Vitória Guimarães (3rd)	(Georgia (country)) Dinamo Tbilisi (CL Q2)	(England) Aston Villa (FP)
Second qualifying round
(Turkey) Fenerbahçe (2nd)	(Czech Republic) Slavia Prague (2nd)	(Austria) GAK (3rd)	(Denmark) Silkeborg (2nd)
(Turkey) Trabzonspor (3rd)	(Czech Republic) Sigma Olomouc (3rd)	(Russia) Rotor Volgograd (2nd)	(Denmark) Vejle (4th)
(Turkey) İstanbulspor (4th)	(Norway) Brann (2nd)	(Russia) Dynamo Moscow (3rd)	(Switzerland) Servette (2nd)
(Greece) AEK Athens (3rd)	(Norway) Strømsgodset (3rd)	(Croatia) Hajduk Split (2nd)	(Switzerland) Zürich (4th)
(Greece) PAOK (4th)	(Austria) Rapid Wien (2nd)	(Croatia) Osijek (3rd)	(Norway) Molde (FP)
First qualifying round
(Poland) Polonia Warsaw (2nd)	(Ukraine) Shakhtar Donetsk (2nd)	(Latvia) Daugava Riga (2nd)	(Wales) Newtown (2nd)
(Poland) Wisła Kraków (3rd)	(Hungary) Ferencváros (2nd)	(Bulgaria) CSKA Sofia (3rd)	(Republic of Ireland) Shelbourne (2nd)
(Belgium) Germinal Ekeren (3rd)	(Slovakia) Inter Bratislava (3rd)	(North Macedonia) Sloga Jugomagnat (2nd)	(Faroe Islands) HB (2nd)
(Belgium) Anderlecht (4th)	(Georgia (country)) Kolkheti-1913 Poti (3rd)	(Lithuania) Žalgiris Vilnius (2nd)	(Albania) Tirana (2nd)
(Romania) Argeș Pitești (3rd)	(Cyprus) Omonia (2nd)	(Federal Republic of Yugoslavia) Red Star Belgrade (2nd)	Union Luxembourg (2nd)
(Romania) Oțelul Galați (4th)	(Israel) Hapoel Tel Aviv (2nd)	(Moldova) Tiligul Tiraspol (2nd)	(Azerbaijan) Dinamo Baku (2nd)
(Sweden) Göteborg (2nd)	(Slovenia) Mura (2nd)	(Estonia) Tallinna Sadam (2nd)	(Andorra) Principat (1st)
(Sweden) Malmö (3rd)	(Belarus) Belshina Bobruisk (2nd)	(Armenia) Shirak (2nd)	(Bosnia and Herzegovina) Željezničar Sarajevo (1st)
(Scotland) Rangers (2nd)	(Iceland) ÍA (2nd)	(Northern Ireland) Linfield (2nd)	(Bosnia and Herzegovina) Sarajevo (2nd)
(Scotland) Kilmarnock (4th)	(Finland) VPS (2nd)	(Malta) Birkirkara (2nd)	(Finland) FinnPa (FP)

== First qualifying round ==
Team 1	Agg.	Team 2	1st leg	2nd leg
Argeș Pitești (Romania)	7–1	(Azerbaijan) Dinamo Baku	5–1	2–0
Belshina Bobruisk (Belarus)	1–3	(Bulgaria) CSKA Sofia	0–0	1–3
Omonia (Cyprus)	8–6	(Northern Ireland) Linfield	5–1	3–5
Shakhtar Donetsk (Ukraine)	6–1	(Malta) Birkirkara	2–1	4–0
Kolkheti Poti (Georgia (country))	0–11	(Federal Republic of Yugoslavia) Red Star Belgrade	0–4	0–7
Inter Bratislava (Slovakia)	4–0	(Albania) SK Tirana	2–0	2–0
Tallinna Sadam (Estonia)	1–5	(Poland) Polonia Warsaw	0–2	1–3
HB (Faroe Islands)	2–4	(Finland) VPS	2–0	0–4
Željezničar (Bosnia and Herzegovina)	1–2	(Scotland) Kilmarnock	1–1	0–1
Mura (Slovenia)	8–2	(Latvia) Daugava Rīga	6–1	2–1
ÍA (Iceland)	3–3 (a)	(Lithuania) Žalgiris Vilnius	3–2	0–1
Hapoel Tel Aviv (Israel)	6–2	(Finland) FinnPa	3–1	3–1
Shirak (Armenia)	0–7	(Sweden) Malmö FF	0–2	0–5
Germinal Ekeren (Belgium)	4–1	(Bosnia and Herzegovina) Sarajevo	4–1	0–0
Shelbourne (Republic of Ireland)	3–7	(Scotland) Rangers	3–5	0–2
Oțelul Galați (Romania)	4–1	(North Macedonia) Sloga Jugomagnat	3–0	1–1
Union Luxembourg	0–7	(Sweden) IFK Göteborg	0–3	0–4
Ferencváros (Hungary)	14–1	(Andorra) Principat	6–0	8–1
Tiligul Tiraspol (Moldova)	0–6	(Belgium) Anderlecht	0–1	0–5
Newtown (Wales)	0–7	(Poland) Wisła Kraków	0–0	0–7

=== First leg ===
21 July 1998
20:30 (CET)

Germinal Ekeren (Belgium)	4–1	(Bosnia and Herzegovina) Sarajevo
Van Ankeren 25'; Morhaye 29', 90'; Kovács 40'	Report	Ferhatović 59'

Veltwijckstadion, Antwerp
Attendance: 1,569
Referee: Lucílio Batista (Portugal)

22 July 1998
15:00 (CET)

Kolkheti Poti (Georgia (country))	0–4	(Federal Republic of Yugoslavia) Red Star Belgrade
	Report	Ognjenović 19'; Ačimovič 57', 71'; Pantelić 63'

Fazisi Stadium, Poti
Attendance: 5,300
Referee: Éric Blareau (Belgium)

22 July 1998
16:00 (CET)

Argeș Pitești (Romania)	5–1	(Azerbaijan) Dinamo Baku
Bălașa 8'; Barbu 10', 77'; Bârdeș 28'; Jilăveanu 87'	Report	Aliyev 36' (pen.)

Stadionul Municipal, Pitești
Attendance: 5,278
Referee: Goran Marić (Croatia)

22 July 1998
16:00 (CET)

Shirak (Armenia)	0–2	(Sweden) Malmö FF
	Report	Pavlovic 55'; Ohlsson 68'

Hrazdan Stadium, Yerevan
Attendance: 2,500
Referee: Srečko Kandare (Slovenia)

22 July 1998
16:00 (CET)

Oțelul Galați (Romania)	3–0	(North Macedonia) Sloga Jugomagnat
Ștefan 29'; Mihalache 41'; Maleș 90' (pen.)	Report

Stadionul Oțelul, Galați
Attendance: 2,154
Referee: Dani Koren (Israel)

22 July 1998
16:00 (CET)

Tiligul Tiraspol (Moldova)	0–1	(Belgium) Anderlecht
	Report	Staelens 52'

Stadionul Municipal, Tiraspol
Attendance: 5,500
Referee: Erol Ersoy (Turkey)

22 July 1998
17:00 (CET)

Tallinna Sadam (Estonia)	0–2	(Poland) Polonia Warsaw
	Report	Olisadebe 34'; Bąk 81'

Kadriorg Stadium, Tallinn
Attendance: 350
Referee: Kazimir Znaydinski (Belarus)

22 July 1998
17:00 (CET)

Hapoel Tel Aviv (Israel)	3–1	(Finland) FinnPa
Cimirotič 31' (pen.); Tubi 53'; Tikva 63'	Report	Hautala 45'

Bloomfield Stadium, Tel Aviv
Attendance: 6,200
Referee: Gerry Perry (Republic of Ireland)

22 July 1998
17:30 (CET)

Mura (Slovenia)	6–1	(Latvia) Daugava Rīga
Cifer 6', 32'; Lukič 17', 88'; Cipot 30'; Galič 39'	Report	Rydny 75'

Stadion Fazanerija, Murska Sobota
Attendance: 1,600
Referee: Valeriy Onufer (Ukraine)

22 July 1998
18:00 (CET)

Belshina Bobruisk (Belarus)	0–0	(Bulgaria) CSKA Sofia
	Report

Dinamo Stadium, Minsk
Attendance: 3,580
Referee: Ceri Richards (Wales)

22 July 1998
18:00 (CET)

Shakhtar Donetsk (Ukraine)	2–1	(Malta) Birkirkara
Seleznyov 62'; Kryventsov 69' (pen.)	Report	Zammit 75'

Shakhtar Stadium, Donetsk
Attendance: 15,000
Referee: Lubomír Puček (Czech Republic)

22 July 1998
19:00 (CET)

Omonia (Cyprus)	5–1	(Northern Ireland) Linfield
Kitanov 41', 61'; Rauffmann 44' (pen.); P. Panagiotou 65'; Kontolefteros 88'	Report	Ferguson 79'

Makario Stadium, Nicosia
Attendance: 8,125
Referee: Claus Bo Larsen (Denmark)

22 July 1998
19:00 (CET)

Inter Bratislava (Slovakia)	2–0	(Albania) SK Tirana
Šuchančok 14'; Miklós 58'	Report

Štadión Pasienky, Bratislava
Attendance: 1,798
Referee: Ivan Dobrinov (Bulgaria)

22 July 1998
19:00 (CET)

Ferencváros (Hungary)	6–0	(Andorra) Principat
Fülöp 25'; Selimi 41'; Schultz 48', 75'; Vámosi 63'; Mátyus 90'	Report

Üllői úti Stadion, Budapest
Attendance: 7,650
Referee: Sten Kaldma (Estonia)

22 July 1998
20:00 (CET)

HB (Faroe Islands)	2–0	(Finland) VPS
S. Johannesen 28', 73'	Report

Svangaskarð, Toftir
Attendance: 350
Referee: Jaroslav Jára (Czech Republic)

22 July 1998
20:00 (CET)

Union Luxembourg	0–3	(Sweden) IFK Göteborg
	Report	Ekström 56'; Nilsson 64' (pen.); Hermansson 88'

Stade Josy Barthel, Luxembourg
Attendance: 352
Referee: Kostas Kapitanis (Cyprus)

22 July 1998
20:00 (CET)

Newtown (Wales)	0–0	(Poland) Wisła Kraków
	Report

Latham Park, Newtown
Attendance: 1,475
Referee: Salem Prolić (Bosnia and Herzegovina)

22 July 1998
20:30 (CET)

Željezničar (Bosnia and Herzegovina)	1–1	(Scotland) Kilmarnock
Vazda 63'	Report	McGowne 59'

Stadion Koševo, Sarajevo
Attendance: 15,000
Referee: Stéphane Bré (France)

22 July 1998
21:00 (CET)

Shelbourne (Republic of Ireland)	3–5	(Scotland) Rangers
Porrini 7' (o.g.); Rutherford 42'; Morley 58'	Report	Albertz 59' (pen.), 83' (pen.); Amato 72', 81'; Van Bronckhorst 74'

Prenton Park, Birkenhead, England
Attendance: 6,047
Referee: Viorel Anghelinei (Romania)

22 July 1998
22:00 (CET)

ÍA (Iceland)	3–2	(Lithuania) Žalgiris Vilnius
Adolfsson 42'; Eyjólfsson 61'; Ivšić 85'	Report	Skinderis 10'; Vasiliauskas 72'

Akranesvöllur, Akranes
Attendance: 809
Referee: Charles Schaack (Luxembourg)

=== Second leg ===
29 July 1998
15:00 (CET)

Dinamo Baku (Azerbaijan)	0–2	(Romania) Argeș Pitești
	Report	Mutu 51'; Jilăveanu 89'

Tofiq Bahramov Republican Stadium, Baku
Attendance: 550
Referee: Stuart Dougal (Scotland)

Argeș Pitești won 7–1 on aggregate.

29 July 1998
17:00 (CET)

SK Tirana (Albania)	0–2	(Slovakia) Inter Bratislava
	Report	Babnič 53'; Miklós 81'

Selman Stërmasi Stadium, Tirana
Attendance: 2,120
Referee: Herbie Barr (Northern Ireland)

Inter Bratislava won 4–0 on aggregate.

29 July 1998
17:00 (CET)

Polonia Warsaw (Poland)	3–1	(Estonia) Tallinna Sadam
Moskal 8'; Wędzyński 16'; Bąk 21'	Report	Krõlov 3'

Polonia Warsaw Stadium, Warsaw
Attendance: 601
Referee: Krsto Danilovski (Macedonia)

Polonia Warsaw won 5–1 on aggregate.

29 July 1998
17:00 (CET)

Žalgiris Vilnius (Lithuania)	1–0	(Iceland) ÍA
Steško 11'	Report

Žalgiris Stadium, Vilnius
Attendance: 1,500
Referee: Nicolas Daina (Switzerland)

3–3 on aggregate; Zalgiris Vilnius won on away goals.

29 July 1998
17:00 (CET)

Wisła Kraków (Poland)	7–0	(Wales) Newtown
Kulawik 28', 47'; Sunday 35'; Kaliciak 51'; Dubicki 54'; Pater 61', 66'	Report

Stadion Miejski, Kraków
Attendance: 5,700
Referee: Yuri Baskakov (Russia)

Wisła Kraków won 7–0 on aggregate.

29 July 1998
17:30 (CET)

CSKA Sofia (Bulgaria)	3–1	(Belarus) Belshina Bobruisk
Petrov 7'; Naydenov 37'; Stanchev 90'	Report	Balashow 50'

Balgarska Armia Stadium, Sofia
Attendance: 8,000
Referee: Martin Ingvarsson (Sweden)

CSKA Sofia won 3–1 on aggregate.

29 July 1998
17:30 (CET)

FinnPa (Finland)	1–3	(Israel) Hapoel Tel Aviv
Geagea 88'	Report	Tikva 5', 18'; Tubi 74'

Helsinki Olympic Stadium, Helsinki
Attendance: 671
Referee: Ferenc Bede (Hungary)

Hapoel Tel Aviv won 6–2 on aggregate.

29 July 1998
18:00 (CET)

Birkirkara (Malta)	0–4	(Ukraine) Shakhtar Donetsk
	Report	Seleznyov 39'; Kriventsov 48'; Kovalev 81' (pen.), 90'

National Stadium, Ta' Qali
Attendance: 3,411
Referee: Hartmut Strampe (Germany)

Shakhtar Donetsk won 6–1 on aggregate.

29 July 1998
18:00 (CET)

Daugava Riga (Latvia)	1–2	(Slovenia) Mura
Šarando 69'	Report	Vogrinčič 59'; Ristić 66'

Latvijas Universitātes Stadions, Riga
Attendance: 120
Referee: Eyjölfur Ólafsson (Iceland)

Mura won 8–2 on aggregate.

29 July 1998
19:00 (CET)

VPS (Finland)	4–0	(Faroe Islands) HB Tórshavn
Suoste 3', 17'; Tarkkio 72'; Nygård 90'	Report

Hietalahti Stadium, Vaasa
Attendance: 2,118
Referee: Asim Khudiev (Azerbaijan)

VPS won 4–2 on aggregate.

29 July 1998
19:00 (CET)

Malmö FF (Sweden)	5–0	(Armenia) Shirak
Thylander 19'; Kindvall 33', 45', 77'; Gudmundsson 68'	Report

Malmö IP, Malmö
Attendance: 2,091
Referee: Oleg Timofeev (Estonia)

Malmö won 7–0 on aggregate.

29 July 1998
19:00 (CET)

IFK Göteborg (Sweden)	4–0	Union Luxembourg
Ekström 17', 50', 79'; Henriksson 80'	Report

Ullevi, Gothenburg
Attendance: 3,073
Referee: Slavik Kazaryan (Armenia)

IFK Göteborg won 7–0 on aggregate.

29 July 1998
20:00 (CET)

Red Star Belgrade (Federal Republic of Yugoslavia)	7–0	(Georgia (country)) Kolkheti Poti
Pantelić 28'; Ognjenović 45' (pen.), 47'; Gojković 54'; Mićić 57', 69', 90'	Report

Red Star Stadium, Belgrade
Attendance: 6,440
Referee: Juan Ansuategui Roca (Spain)

Red Star Belgrade won 11–0 on aggregate.

28 July 1998
20:00 (CET)

Sarajevo (Bosnia and Herzegovina)	0–0	(Belgium) Germinal Ekeren
	Report

Koševo Stadium, Sarajevo
Attendance: 11,000
Referee: Karl-Erik Nilsson (Sweden)

Germinal Ekeren won 4–1 on aggregate.

29 July 1998
20:00 (CET)

Sloga Jugomagnat (North Macedonia)	1–1	(Romania) Oţelul Galaţi
Stankovski 41'	Report	Mihalache 58'

Čair Stadium, Skopje
Attendance: 1,500
Referee: Vencel Tóth (Hungary)

Oţelul Galaţi won 4–1 on aggregate.

29 July 1998
20:00 (CET)

Anderlecht (Belgium)	5–0	(Moldova) Tiligul Tiraspol
Stoica 31'; De Boeck 42'; Dheedene 55'; Taument 59'; Årst 77'	Report

Constant Vanden Stock Stadium, Brussels
Attendance: 14,024
Referee: Slavko Radulović (FR Yugoslavia)

Anderlecht won 6–0 on aggregate.

29 July 1998
20:30 (CET)

Linfield (Northern Ireland)	5–3	(Cyprus) Omonia
Feeney 19'; Gorman 34', 48'; McDonald 44'; Ferguson 72'	Report	Marangos 2'; Kitanov 14', 22'

Windsor Park, Belfast
Attendance: 2,114
Referee: Sorin Corpodean (Romania)

Omonia won 8–6 on aggregate.

29 July 1998
20:45 (CET)

Kilmarnock (Scotland)	1–0	(Bosnia and Herzegovina) Željezničar
Mahood 31'	Report

Rugby Park, Kilmarnock
Attendance: 14,512
Referee: Metin Tokat (Turkey)

Kilmarnock won 2–1 on aggregate.

29 July 1998
20:45 (CET)

Rangers (Scotland)	2–0	(Republic of Ireland) Shelbourne
Johansson 4', 89'	Report

Ibrox Stadium, Glasgow
Attendance: 46,906
Referee: Mirosław Milewski (Poland)

Rangers won 7–3 on aggregate.

29 July 1998
22:00 (CET)

Principat (Andorra)	1–8	(Hungary) Ferencváros
Pasqui 24'	Report	Selimi 18', 74'; Kovács 23', 83'; Kriston 51'; Nagy 52'; Schultz 84'; Jagodics 88'

Estadi Comunal, Andorra la Vella
Attendance: 850
Referee: Marco Tura (San Marino)

Ferencváros won 14–1 on aggregate.

== Second qualifying round ==
Team 1	Agg.	Team 2	1st leg	2nd leg
Red Star Belgrade (Federal Republic of Yugoslavia)	4–2	(Russia) Rotor Volgograd	2–1	2–1
Ferencváros (Hungary)	4–6	(Greece) AEK Athens	4–2	0–4
Germinal Ekeren (Belgium)	3–5	(Switzerland) Servette	1–4	2–1
Argeş Piteşti (Romania)	4–4 (a)	(Turkey) İstanbulspor	2–0	2–4
Molde (Norway)	0–2	(Bulgaria) CSKA Sofia	0–0	0–2
IFK Göteborg (Sweden)	2–2 (a)	(Turkey) Fenerbahçe	2–1	0–1
Mura (Slovenia)	0–2	(Denmark) Silkeborg	0–0	0–2
Rangers (Scotland)	2–0	(Greece) PAOK	2–0	0–0
Slavia Prague (Czech Republic)	4–2	(Slovakia) Inter Bratislava	4–0	0–2
Zürich (Switzerland)	6–3	(Ukraine) Shakhtar Donetsk	4–0	2–3
Brann (Norway)	1–0	(Lithuania) Zalgiris Vilnius	1–0	0–0
Wisła Kraków (Poland)	7–2	(Turkey) Trabzonspor	5–1	2–1
Vejle (Denmark)	6–0	(Romania) Oţelul Galaţi	3–0	3–0
Hapoel Tel Aviv (Israel)	1–1 (2–4 p)	(Norway) Strømsgodset	1–0	0–1 (aet)
Osijek (Croatia)	3–3 (a)	(Belgium) Anderlecht	3–1	0–2
Omonia (Cyprus)	3–3 (a)	(Austria) Rapid Wien	3–1	0–2
VPS (Finland)	0–3	(Austria) GAK	0–0	0–3
Polonia Warsaw (Poland)	0–2	(Russia) Dynamo Moscow	0–1	0–1
Hajduk Split (Croatia)	3–2	(Sweden) Malmö	1–1	2–1
Sigma Olomouc (Czech Republic)	4–0	(Scotland) Kilmarnock	2–0	2–0

=== First leg ===
11 August 1998
16:30 (CET)

Sigma Olomouc (Czech Republic)	2–0	(Scotland) Kilmarnock
Krohmer 27'; König 79'	Report

Andrův stadion, Olomouc
Attendance: 3,660
Referee: Erol Ersoy (Turkey)

11 August 1998
17:00 (CET)

Hapoel Tel Aviv (Israel)	1–0	(Norway) Strømsgodset
Tubi 75'	Report

Bloomfield Stadium, Tel Aviv
Attendance: 7,000
Referee: Marcel Lică (Romania)

11 August 1998
17:00 (CET)

Polonia Warsaw (Poland)	0–1	(Russia) Dynamo Moscow
	Report	Gusev 54'

Polonia Warsaw Stadium, Warsaw
Attendance: 2,500
Referee: Oğuz Sarvan (Turkey)

11 August 1998
17:15 (CET)

Argeş Piteşti (Romania)	2–0	(Turkey) İstanbulspor
Mutu 33'; Barbu 79'	Report

Stadionul Nicolae Dobrin, Pitești
Attendance: 4,300
Referee: Knud Erik Fisker (Denmark)

11 August 1998
17:30 (CET)

Mura (Slovenia)	0–0	(Denmark) Silkeborg
	Report

Fazanerija City Stadium, Murska Sobota
Attendance: 2,500
Referee: Andreas Georgiou (Cyprus)

11 August 1998
18:00 (CET)

Brann (Norway)	1–0	(Lithuania) Zalgiris Vilnius
Kvisvik 75'	Report

Brann Stadion, Bergen
Attendance: 2,028
Referee: Miroslav Liba (Czech Republic)

11 August 1998
18:00 (CET)

VPS (Finland)	0–0	(Austria) GAK
	Report

Hietalahti Stadium, Vaasa
Attendance: 2,934
Referee: Valentin Ivanov (Russia)

11 August 1998
19:00 (CET)

Molde (Norway)	0–0	(Bulgaria) CSKA Sofia
	Report

Molde Stadion, Molde
Attendance: 2,243
Referee: Jacek Granat (Poland)

11 August 1998
19:00 (CET)

Slavia Prague (Czech Republic)	4–0	(Slovakia) Inter Bratislava
Vágner 22', 89'; Kozel 55'; Skála 71'	Report

Stadion Eden, Prague
Attendance: 3,521
Referee: Juan Ansuategui Roca (Spain)

11 August 1998
19:30 (CET)

IFK Göteborg (Sweden)	2–1	(Turkey) Fenerbahçe
Hermansson 37'; Persson 74'	Report	Şentürk 49'

Ullevi, Gothenburg
Attendance: 5,529
Referee: Sergei Khusainov (Russia)

11 August 1998
19:30 (CET)

Zürich (Switzerland)	4–0	(Ukraine) Shakhtar Donetsk
Sant'Anna 1'; Đorđević 61'; Chassot 71'; Tarone 88'	Report

Letzigrund, Zürich
Attendance: 6,000
Referee: Fernand Meese (Belgium)

11 August 1998
19:30 (CET)

Wisła Kraków (Poland)	5–1	(Turkey) Trabzonspor
Dubicki 3'; Kulawik 33', 71', 80'; Zając 89'	Report	Vugrinec 66'

Stadion Miejski, Kraków
Attendance: 8,508
Referee: Mikko Vuorela (Finland)

11 August 1998
20:00 (CET)

Red Star Belgrade (Federal Republic of Yugoslavia)	2–1	(Russia) Rotor Volgograd
Škorić 60' (pen.); Ognjenović 90' (pen.)	Report	Abramov 66'

Red Star Stadium, Belgrade
Attendance: 13,323
Referee: Hellmut Krug (Germany)

11 August 1998
20:00 (CET)

Ferencváros (Hungary)	4–2	(Greece) AEK Athens
Selimi 10'; Lendvai 29'; Nyilas 55'; Vincze 83'	Report	Nikolaidis 89'; Sebwe 90'

Stadion Albert Flórián, Budapest
Attendance: 8,860
Referee: David Elleray (Ireland)

11 August 1998
20:00 (CET)

Vejle (Denmark)	3–0	(Romania) Oţelul Galaţi
Wael 31', 40'; Søgaard 62'	Report

Odense Atletikstadion, Odense
Attendance: 2,172
Referee: Goran Marić (Croatia)

11 August 1998
20:15 (CET)

Germinal Ekeren (Belgium)	1–4	(Switzerland) Servette
Morhaye 85'	Report	Rey 21' (pen.), 51'; Wolf 36'; Durix 79'

Veltwijckpark, Antwerp
Attendance: 1,217
Referee: Sándor Piller (Hungary)

11 August 1998
20:15 (CET)

Osijek (Croatia)	3–1	(Belgium) Anderlecht
Krpan 29'; Prišć 54'; Vranješ 81'	Report	Claeys 80'

Stadion Gradski vrt, Osijek
Attendance: 8,000
Referee: Dieter Schoch (Switzerland)

11 August 1998
20:15 (CET)

Hajduk Split (Croatia)	1–1	(Sweden) Malmö
Brajković 44'	Report	Bjarnason 72'

Stadion Poljud, Split
Attendance: 9,765
Referee: Dick Jol (Netherlands)

11 August 1998
20:30 (CET)

Omonia (Cyprus)	3–1	(Austria) Rapid Wien
Rauffmann 42', 57'; Malekkos 46'	Report	Wagner 23'

Makario Stadium, Nicosia
Attendance: 7,512
Referee: Luc Huyghe (Belgium)

11 August 1998
20:45 (CET)

Rangers (Scotland)	2–0	(Greece) PAOK
Kanchelskis 55'; Wallace 68'	Report

Ibrox Stadium, Glasgow
Attendance: 35,392
Referee: Kim Milton Nielsen (Denmark)

=== Second leg ===
25 August 1998
16:00 (CET)

Zalgiris Vilnius (Lithuania)	0–0	(Norway) Brann
	Report

Žalgiris Stadium, Vilnius
Attendance: 1,500
Referee: Stuart Dougal (Scotland)

Brann won 1–0 on aggregate.

25 August 1998
16:00 (CET)

Oţelul Galaţi (Romania)	0–3	(Denmark) Vejle
	Report	Jung 21'; Graulund 35'; Wael 53'

Stadionul Oțelul, Galați
Attendance: 7,410
Referee: Milan Mitrović (Slovenia)

Vejle won 6–0 on aggregate.

25 August 1998
17:00 (CET)

CSKA Sofia (Bulgaria)	2–0	(Norway) Molde
Petkov 39'; Stanchev 60'	Report

Balgarska Armia Stadium, Sofia
Attendance: 11,340
Referee: Alain Hamer (Luxembourg)

CSKA Sofia won 2–0 on aggregate.

25 August 1998
17:00 (CET)

Dynamo Moscow (Russia)	1–0	(Poland) Polonia Warsaw
Teryokhin 89'	Report

Dynamo Stadium, Moscow
Attendance: 4,500
Referee: Bohdan Benedik (Slovakia)

Dynamo Moscow won 2–0 on aggregate.

25 August 1998
18:00 (CET)

Rotor Volgograd (Russia)	1–2	(Federal Republic of Yugoslavia) Red Star Belgrade
Zernov 59'	Report	Ognjenović 70'; Dudić 80'

Central Stadium, Volgograd
Attendance: 9,000
Referee: Günter Benkö (Austria)

Red Star Belgrade won 4–2 on aggregate.

25 August 1998
18:00 (CET)

Shakhtar Donetsk (Ukraine)	3–2	(Switzerland) Zürich
Orbu 24', 69'; Štolcers 90'	Report	Bartlett 16', 26'

Shakhtar Stadium, Donetsk
Attendance: 7,530
Referee: Dani Koren (Israel)

Zürich won 6–3 on aggregate.

25 August 1998
18:30 (CET)

Rapid Wien (Austria)	2–0	(Cyprus) Omonia
Heraf 9'; Wagner 70'	Report

Gerhard Hanappi Stadium, Vienna
Attendance: 14,500
Referee: Morgan Norman (Sweden)

3–3 on aggregate; Rapid Wien won on away goals.

25 August 1998
19:00 (CET)

Silkeborg (Denmark)	2–0	(Slovenia) Mura
Sørensen 63'; Røll 64'	Report

Silkeborg Stadium, Silkeborg
Attendance: 2,550
Referee: John McDermott (Republic of Ireland)

Silkeborg won 2–0 on aggregate.

25 August 1998
19:00 (CET)

Inter Bratislava (Slovakia)	2–0	(Czech Republic) Slavia Prague
Babnič 12'; Ovad 51'	Report

Štadión Pasienky, Bratislava
Attendance: 3,474
Referee: Stefano Braschi (Italy)

Slavia Prague won 4–2 on aggregate.

25 August 1998
19:00 (CET)

Malmö (Sweden)	1–2	(Croatia) Hajduk Split
Ohlsson 90'	Report	Vučko 41', 55'

Malmö Stadion, Malmö
Attendance: 4,453
Referee: Konrad Plautz (Austria)

Hajduk Split won 3–2 on aggregate.

25 August 1998
19:05 (CET)

Strømsgodset (Norway)	1–0	(Israel) Hapoel Tel Aviv
Michelsen 75'	Report
Penalties
	4–2

Marienlyst Stadion, Drammen
Attendance: 2,160
Referee: Ivan Dobrinov (Bulgaria)

1–1 on aggregate; Strømsgodset won 4–2 on penalties.

25 August 1998
19:30 (CET)

Fenerbahçe (Turkey)	1–0	(Sweden) IFK Göteborg
Baljić 64'	Report

Şükrü Saracoğlu Stadium, Istanbul
Attendance: 22,697
Referee: Rémi Harrel (France)

2–2 on aggregate; Fenerbahçe won on away goals.

25 August 1998
19:30 (CET)

Trabzonspor (Turkey)	1–2	(Poland) Wisła Kraków
Çimşir 68'	Report	Sunday 52'; Kulawik 62'

Hüseyin Avni Aker Stadium, Trabzon
Attendance: 5,871
Referee: Vasyl Melnychuk (Ukraine)

Wisła Kraków won 7–2 on aggregate.

25 August 1998
20:00 (CET)

AEK Athens (Greece)	4–0	(Hungary) Ferencváros
Nikolaidis 8', 13' (pen.), 26' (pen.); Donis 63'	Report

Nea Smyrni Stadium, Athens
Attendance: 20,441
Referee: Nikolai Levnikov (Russia)

AEK Athens won 6–4 on aggregate.

25 August 1998
20:00 (CET)

Servette (Switzerland)	1–2	(Belgium) Germinal Ekeren
Rey 83' (pen.)	Report	Fournier 6' (o.g.); Karagiannis 43'

Charmilles Stadium, Geneva
Attendance: 5,834
Referee: Aron Huzu (Romania)

Servette won 5–3 on aggregate.

25 August 1998
20:00 (CET)

Anderlecht (Belgium)	2–0	(Croatia) Osijek
Årst 4'; Stoica 85'	Report

Constant Vanden Stock Stadium, Brussels
Attendance: 17,090
Referee: Claus Bo Larsen (Denmark)

3–3 on aggregate; Anderlecht won on away goals.

25 August 1998
20:15 (CET)

PAOK (Greece)	0–0	(Scotland) Rangers
	Report

Toumba Stadium, Thessaloniki
Attendance: 30,388
Referee: Markus Merk (Germany)

Rangers won 2–0 on aggregate.

25 August 1998
20:30 (CET)

GAK (Austria)	3–0	(Finland) VPS
Luhový 51'; Grimm 54'; Drechsel 90'	Report

Arnold Schwarzenegger-Stadion, Graz
Attendance: 4,918
Referee: Václav Krondl (Czech Republic)

GAK won 3–0 on aggregate.

25 August 1998
20:45 (CET)

Kilmarnock (Scotland)	0–2	(Czech Republic) Sigma Olomouc
	Report	Heinz 13'; Mucha 19'

Rugby Park, Kilmarnock
Attendance: 11,140
Referee: Lucílio Batista (Portugal)

Sigma Olomouc won 4–0 on aggregate.

27 August 1998
19:30 (CET)

İstanbulspor (Turkey)	4–2	(Romania) Argeş Piteşti
Akyüz 14'; Sergen 20'; Mehmet 78'; Kocaman 86'	Report	Mutu 53'; Barbu 73'

İnönü Stadium, Istanbul
Attendance: 18,760
Referee: Hans-Jürgen Weber (Germany)

4–4 on aggregate; Argeş Piteşti won on away goals.

== First round ==
Team 1	Agg.	Team 2	1st leg	2nd leg
Sparta Prague (Czech Republic)	2–5	(Spain) Real Sociedad	2–4	0–1
Fenerbahçe (Turkey)	2–3	(Italy) Parma	1–0	1–3
Blackburn Rovers (England)	2–3	(France) Lyon	0–1	2–2
Dynamo Moscow (Russia)	5–4	(Latvia) Skonto	2–2	3–2
Vitória de Guimarães (Portugal)	2–4	(Scotland) Celtic	1–2	1–2
Stuttgart (Germany)	4–3	(Netherlands) Feyenoord	1–3	3–0
Argeş Piteşti (Romania)	0–8	(Spain) Celta Vigo	0–1	0–7
Silkeborg (Denmark)	0–3	(Italy) Roma	0–2	0–1
LKS Łódź (Poland)	1–3	(France) Monaco	1–3	0–0
Litex Lovech (Bulgaria)	1–3	(Austria) GAK	1–1	0–2
Anderlecht (Belgium)	0–2	(Switzerland) Grasshoppers	0–2	0–0
Fiorentina (Italy)	2–1	(Croatia) Hajduk Split	2–1^{1}	0–0
Aston Villa (England)	6–2	(Norway) Strømsgodset	3–2	3–0
Schalke 04 (Germany)	1–1 (4–5 p)	(Czech Republic) Slavia Prague	1–0	0–1 (aet)
Servette (Switzerland)	2–2 (a)	(Bulgaria) CSKA Sofia	2–1	0–1
Red Star Belgrade (Federal Republic of Yugoslavia)	3–3 (4–3 p)	(France) Metz	2–1	1–2 (aet)
Košice (Slovakia)	0–8	(England) Liverpool	0–3	0–5
Sporting CP (Portugal)	1–4	(Italy) Bologna	0–2	1–2
Maribor (Slovenia)	0–5	(Poland) Wisła Kraków	0–2	0–3
Vejle (Denmark)	1–5	(Spain) Real Betis	1–0	0–5
Bordeaux (France)	3–2	(Austria) Rapid Wien	1–1	2–1
Atlético Madrid (Spain)	3–0	(Federal Republic of Yugoslavia) Obilić	2–0	1–0^{2}
Beitar Jerusalem (Israel)	3–5	(Scotland) Rangers	1–1	2–4
Leeds United (England)	1–1 (4–1 p)	(Portugal) Marítimo	1–0	0–1 (aet)
Udinese (Italy)	1–2	(Germany) Bayer Leverkusen	1–1	0–1
Steaua Bucharest (Romania)	3–7	(Spain) Valencia	3–4	0–3
Willem II (Netherlands)	6–0	(Georgia (country)) Dinamo Tbilisi	3–0	3–0
Zürich (Switzerland)	7–2	(Cyprus) Anorthosis Famagusta	4–0	3–2
Újpest (Hungary)	2–7	(Belgium) Club Brugge	0–5	2–2
Vitesse Arnhem (Netherlands)	6–3	(Greece) AEK Athens	3–0	3–3
Brann (Norway)	2–4	(Germany) Werder Bremen	2–0	0–4 (aet)
Sigma Olomouc (Czech Republic)	2–6	(France) Marseille	2–2	0–4

- ^{1} The first leg of the Fiorentina vs. Hajduk Split tie was played at the Stadio San Nicola in Bari instead of Fiorentina's home ground in Florence due to the club serving a stadium ban over an incident during their 1996–97 Cup Winners' Cup semifinal second leg match against Barcelona on 24 April 1997. The incident saw Barcelona player Iván de la Peña requiring medical assistance after getting hit with an object thrown from the stands as Fiorentina fans pelted the pitch with missiles following Barcelona's second goal in the 35th minute of the match. Part of the punishment for Fiorentina was being required to play their next two European home matches at least 300 km away from their home stadium. Since Fiorentina failed to qualify for European competition in the 1997–98 season, the punishment was enacted during their 1998–99 UEFA Cup campaign.
- ^{2} The return leg of the Atlético Madrid vs. Obilić tie was played at the Partizan Stadium in Belgrade due to Obilić's home ground not meeting UEFA standards for European competition.

=== First leg ===
15 September 1998
15:30 (CET)

LKS Łódź (Poland)	1–3	(France) Monaco
Matys 10'	Report	Bendkowski 59' (o.g.); Trezeguet 69' (pen.); Špehar 84'

Stadion ŁKS, Łódź
Attendance: 2,700
Referee: Aron Huzu (Romania)

15 September 1998
16:00 (CET)

Argeş Piteşti (Romania)	0–1	(Spain) Celta Vigo
	Report	Sánchez 25'

Stadionul Nicolae Dobrin, Pitești
Attendance: 14,500
Referee: Andreas Georgiou (Cyprus)

15 September 1998
16:00 (CET)

Silkeborg (Denmark)	0–2	(Italy) Roma
	Report	Totti 62'; Alenichev 70'

Slikeborg Stadion, Silkeborg
Attendance: 4,192
Referee: Valentin Ivanov (Russia)

15 September 1998
17:00 (CET)

Dynamo Moscow (Russia)	2–2	(Latvia) Skonto
Golovskoy 2'; Astrowski 69'	Report	Miholaps 39'; Pahars 49'

Dynamo Stadium, Moscow
Attendance: 5,500
Referee: Željko Širić (Croatia)

15 September 1998
17:00 (CET)

Brann (Norway)	2–0	(Germany) Werder Bremen
Moen 29'; Løvvik 48'	Report

Brann Stadion, Bergen
Attendance: 5,091
Referee: Robert Boggi (Italy)

15 September 1998
18:00 (CET)

Red Star Belgrade (Federal Republic of Yugoslavia)	2–1	(France) Metz
Ognjenović 3'; Drulić 12'	Report	Rodriguez 90'

Red Star Stadium, Belgrade
Attendance: 35,139
Referee: Graziano Cesari (Italy)

15 September 1998
18:00 (CET)

Litex Lovech (Bulgaria)	1–1	(Austria) GAK
Stoilov 60'	Report	Lipa 56'

Neftochimic Stadium, Burgas
Attendance: 4,000
Referee: Luc Huyghe (Belgium)

15 September 1998
18:30 (CET)

Willem II (Netherlands)	3–0	(Georgia (country)) Dinamo Tbilisi
Ramzi 74'; Arts 80'; Schenning 86'	Report

Koning Willem II Stadion, Tilburg
Attendance: 9,000
Referee: Mikko Vuorela (Finland)

15 September 1998
19:00 (CET)

Fenerbahçe (Turkey)	1–0	(Italy) Parma
Moldovan 23'	Report

Şükrü Saracoğlu Stadium, Istanbul
Attendance: 20,016
Referee: Paul Durkin (England)

15 September 1998
19:00 (CET)

Beitar Jerusalem (Israel)	1–1	(Scotland) Rangers
Nervo 16' (pen.)	Report	Albertz 85'

Teddy Stadium, Jerusalem
Attendance: 6,120
Referee: Bernard Saules (France)

15 September 1998
19:00 (CET)

Sigma Olomouc (Czech Republic)	2–2	(France) Marseille
Heinz 35', 41'	Report	Ravanelli 29'; Roy 83'

Andrův stadion, Olomouc
Attendance: 6,558
Referee: Fiorenzo Treossi (Italy)

15 September 1998
19:00 (CET)

Schalke 04 (Germany)	1–0	(Czech Republic) Slavia Prague
Wilmots 40'	Report

Parkstadion, Gelsenkirchen
Attendance: 55,353
Referee: Terje Hauge (Norway)

15 September 1998
19:00 (CET)

Maribor (Slovenia)	0–2	(Poland) Wisła Kraków
	Report	Frankowski 22'; Pater 45'

Ljudski vrt, Maribor
Attendance: 4,300
Referee: Erol Ersoy (Turkey)

15 September 1998
20:00 (CET)

Servette (Switzerland)	2–1	(Bulgaria) CSKA Sofia
Pizzinat 84'; Melunović 89'	Report	Stanchev 45'

Charmilles Stadium, Geneva
Attendance: 5,200
Referee: Sándor Puhl (Hungary)

15 September 1998
20:00 (CET)

Košice (Slovakia)	0–3	(England) Liverpool
	Report	Berger 18'; Riedle 23'; Owen 59'

Vsesportovny areal, Košice
Attendance: 2,314
Referee: Juan Manuel Brito Arceo (Spain)

15 September 1998
20:00 (CET)

Fiorentina (Italy)	2–1	(Croatia) Hajduk Split
Edmundo 51', 82'	Report	Vučko 45'

Stadio San Nicola, Bari
Attendance: 5,732
Referee: Graham Barber (England)

15 September 1998
20:00 (CET)

Zürich (Switzerland)	4–0	(Cyprus) Anorthosis Famagusta
Nixon 35'; Hodel 58'; Bartlett 69'; Chassot 81'	Report

Letzigrund, Zürich
Attendance: 4,100
Referee: Sergey Shmolik (Belarus)

15 September 1998
20:00 (CET)

Újpest (Hungary)	0–5	(Belgium) Club Brugge
	Report	Jankauskas 12'; Ilić 26'; Vermant 42'; Anić 50'; Elonga-Ekakia 90'

Megyeri úti stadion, Budapest
Attendance: 975
Referee: Peter Jones (England)

15 September 1998
20:00 (CET)

Vitesse Arnhem (Netherlands)	3–0	(Greece) AEK Athens
Laros 16'; Perović 53'; Machlas 90'	Report

GelreDome, Arnhem
Attendance: 17,868
Referee: Lucílio Batista (Portugal)

15 September 1998
20:15 (CET)

Sparta Prague (Czech Republic)	2–4	(Spain) Real Sociedad
Čížek 31'; Lokvenc 40'	Report	Kovačević 8', 58'; Aldeondo 48' de Pedro 82'

Stadion Letná, Prague
Attendance: 8,106
Referee: Leif Sundell (Sweden)

15 September 1998
20:30 (CET)

Vejle (Denmark)	1–0	(Spain) Real Betis
Graulund 86'	Report

Vejle Stadion, Vejle
Attendance: 6,036
Referee: Alan Snoddy (Northern Ireland)

15 September 1998
20:30 (CET)

Steaua Bucharest (Romania)	3–4	(Spain) Valencia
Lincar 30'; Roşu 60'; Dumitrescu 84'	Report	Ilie 11', 24'; Angulo 78', 86'

Stadionul Steaua, Bucharest
Attendance: 8,900
Referee: Urs Meier (Switzerland)

15 September 1998
20:45 (CET)

Stuttgart (Germany)	1–3	(Netherlands) Feyenoord
Bobic 31'	Report	Van Gastel 19'; Tomasson 21', 32'

Gottlieb-Daimler-Stadion, Stuttgart
Attendance: 16,500
Referee: Anders Frisk (Sweden)

15 September 1998
20:45 (CET)

Aston Villa (England)	3–2	(Norway) Strømsgodset
Charles 83'; Vassell 89', 90'	Report	Michelsen 21'; George 23'

Villa Park, Birmingham
Attendance: 28,893
Referee: Hartmut Strampe (Germany)

15 September 1998
20:45 (CET)

Bordeaux (France)	1–1	(Austria) Rapid Wien
Hatz 23' (o.g.)	Report	Freund 65'

Stade du Parc Lescure, Bordeaux
Attendance: 13,013
Referee: William Young (Scotland)

15 September 1998
20:45 (CET)

Leeds United (England)	1–0	(Portugal) Marítimo
Hasselbaink 84'	Report

Elland Road, Leeds
Attendance: 38,033
Referee: Alain Sars (France)

15 September 1998
20:45 (CET)

Udinese (Italy)	1–1	(Germany) Bayer Leverkusen
Walem 82'	Report	Kirsten 10'

Stadio Friuli, Udine
Attendance: 28,753
Referee: Sándor Piller (Hungary)

15 September 1998
21:00 (CET)

Blackburn Rovers (England)	0–1	(France) Lyon
	Report	Bąk 86'

Ewood Park, Blackburn
Attendance: 13,646
Referee: Knud Erik Fisker (Denmark)

15 September 1998
21:30 (CET)

Atlético Madrid (Spain)	2–0	(Federal Republic of Yugoslavia) Obilić
Juninho 15'; José Mari 53'	Report

Vicente Calderón Stadium, Madrid
Attendance: 12,000
Referee: Edgar Steinborn (Germany)

15 September 1998
22:00 (CET)

Vitória de Guimarães (Portugal)	1–2	(Scotland) Celtic
Geraldo 90'	Report	Larsson 1'; Donnelly 72'

Estádio D. Afonso Henriques, Guimarães
Attendance: 3,400
Referee: Lutz Michael Fröhlich (Germany)

15 September 1998
22:30 (CET)

Sporting CP (Portugal)	0–2	(Italy) Bologna
	Report	Nervo 16'; Eriberto 90'

Estádio José Alvalade, Lisbon
Attendance: 25,000
Referee: Jan Wegereef (Netherlands)

16 September 1998
18:00 (CET)

Anderlecht (Belgium)	0–2	(Switzerland) Grasshopper
	Report	Comisetti 52'; Tikva 56'

Constant Vanden Stock Stadium, Brussels
Attendance: 10,430
Referee: Marcel Lică (Romania)

=== Second leg ===
29 September 1998
15:00 (CET)

Wisła Kraków (Poland)	3–0	(Slovenia) Maribor
Zając 85', 90'; Kulawik 89'	Report

Stadion Miejski, Kraków
Attendance: 4,093
Referee: Karol Ihring (Slovakia)

Wisła Kraków won 5–0 on aggregate.

29 September 1998
16:00 (CET)

Slavia Prague (Czech Republic)	1–0 (a.e.t.)	(Germany) Schalke 04
Dostálek 18'	Report
Penalties
Horváth (penalty scored); Labant (penalty scored); Dostálek (penalty scored); Vágner (penalty scored); Kozel (penalty scored)	5–4	(penalty scored) Anderbrügge; (penalty scored) Thon; (penalty scored) Max; (penalty scored) Eijkelkamp; (penalty missed) van Hoogdalem

Stadion Eden, Prague
Attendance: 8,879
Referee: Rémi Harrel (France)

1–1 on aggregate; Slavia Prague won 5–4 on penalties.

29 September 1998
16:00 (CET)

Bologna (Italy)	2–1	(Portugal) Sporting CP
Nervo 78'; Signori 90'	Report	Leandro Machado 65'

Stadio Renato Dall'Ara, Bologna
Attendance: 3,698
Referee: Eric Romain (Belgium)

Bologna won 4–1 on aggregate.

29 September 1998
16:30 (CET)

Dinamo Tbilisi (Georgia (country))	0–3	(Netherlands) Willem II
	Report	Valk 19'; Ceesay 81'; Ramzi 89'

Boris Paichadze National Stadium, Tbilisi
Attendance: 14,000
Referee: Lubomír Puček (Czech Republic)

Willem II won 6–0 on aggregate.

29 September 1998
17:00 (CET)

CSKA Sofia (Bulgaria)	1–0	(Switzerland) Servette
Stanchev 10'	Report

Balgarska Armia Stadium, Sofia
Attendance: 15,000
Referee: Claus Bo Larsen (Denmark)

2–2 on aggregate; CSKA Sofia won on away goals.

29 September 1998
17:30 (CET)

Skonto (Latvia)	2–3	(Russia) Dynamo Moscow
Pahars 75', 89'	Report	Gusev 7'; Līdaks 60' (o.g.); Teryokhin 78'

Daugava Stadium, Riga
Attendance: 3,500
Referee: Attila Juhos (Hungary)

Dynamo Moscow won 5–4 on aggregate.

29 September 1998
18:00 (CET)

Hajduk Split (Croatia)	0–0	(Italy) Fiorentina
	Report

Stadion Poljud, Split
Attendance: 31,496
Referee: Claude Colombo (France)

Fiorentina won 2–1 on aggregate.

29 September 1998
18:00 (CET)

Strømsgodset (Norway)	0–3	(England) Aston Villa
	Report	Collymore 10', 23', 64'

Marienlyst Stadion, Drammen
Attendance: 4,835
Referee: Dieter Schoch (Switzerland)

Aston Villa won 6–2 on aggregate.

29 September 1998
18:30 (CET)

GAK (Austria)	2–0	(Bulgaria) Litex Lovech
Golombek 8'; Akwuegbu 82'	Report

Arnold Schwarzenegger-Stadion, Graz
Attendance: 7,536
Referee: Jacek Granat (Norway)

GAK won 3–1 on aggregate.

29 September 1998
18:30 (CET)

Metz (France)	2–1 (a.e.t.)	(Federal Republic of Yugoslavia) Red Star Belgrade
Kastendeuch 38'; Meyrieu 68' (pen.)	Report	Marinović 18'
Penalties
Proment (penalty scored); Meyrieu (penalty scored); Jestrović (penalty missed); Boffin (penalty missed); Kastendeuch (penalty scored)	3–4	(penalty scored) Ljubojević; (penalty scored) Škorić; (penalty scored) Aćimović; (penalty missed) Mićić; (penalty scored) Bunjevčević

Stade Saint-Symphorien, Metz
Attendance: 8,448
Referee: Jacek Granat (Poland)

3–3 on aggregate; Red Star Belgrade won 4–3 on penalties.

29 September 1998
18:30 (CET)

Werder Bremen (Germany)	4–0 (a.e.t.)	(Norway) Brann
Wicky 33'; Wiedener 70'; Maksymov 101'; Flo 110'	Report

Weser-Stadion, Bremen
Attendance: 17,774
Referee: Metin Tokat (Turkey)

Werder Bremen won 4–2 on aggregate.

29 September 1998
19:00 (CET)

Anorthosis Famagusta (Cyprus)	2–3	(Switzerland) Zürich
Fischer 45' (o.g.); Krčmarević 73'	Report	Sant'Anna 12'; Bartlett 38', 62'

Antonis Papadopoulos Stadium, Larnaca
Attendance: 850
Referee: Kenny Clark (Scotland)

Zürich won 7–2 on aggregate.

29 September 1998
19:00 (CET)

Marseille (France)	4–0	(Czech Republic) Sigma Olomouc
Dugarry 19', 76'; Pires 23', 86'	Report

Stade Vélodrome, Marseille
Attendance: 17,868
Referee: Hartmut Strampe (Germany)

Marseille won 6–2 on aggregate.

29 September 1998
20:00 (CET)

Real Sociedad (Spain)	1–0	(Czech Republic) Sparta Prague
Kovačević 52'	Report

Anoeta, San Sebastián
Attendance: 23,000
Referee: Michel Piraux (Belgium)

Real Sociedad won 5–2 on aggregate.

29 September 1998
20:00 (CET)

Feyenoord (Netherlands)	0–3	(Germany) Stuttgart
	Report	Balakov 35'; Đorđević 70'; Bobic 90'

De Kuip, Rotterdam
Attendance: 34,387
Referee: José María García-Aranda (Spain)

Stuttgart won 4–3 on aggregate.

29 September 1998
20:00 (CET)

AEK Athens (Greece)	3–3	(Netherlands) Vitesse
Nikolaidis 14', 75'; Kopitsis 69'	Report	Machlas 11', 17'; Reuser 51'

Nikos Goumas Stadium, Athens
Attendance: 20,364
Referee: Livio Bazzoli (Italy)

Vitesse won 6–3 on aggregate.

29 September 1998
20:15 (CET)

Monaco (France)	0–0	(Poland) ŁKS Łódź
	Report

Stade Louis II, Monaco
Attendance: 5,200
Referee: Georg Dardenne (Germany)

Monaco won 3–1 on aggregate.

29 September 1998
20:15 (CET)

Grasshopper (Switzerland)	0–0	(Belgium) Anderlecht
	Report

Hardturm, Zürich
Attendance: 7,340
Referee: Georgios Bikas (Greece)

Grasshoppers won 2–0 on aggregate.

29 September 1998
20:15 (CET)

Club Brugge (Belgium)	2–2	(Hungary) Újpest
Borkelmans 32'; Vermant 70'	Report	Kopunović 49'; Szanyó 90' (pen.)

Jan Breydel Stadium, Bruges
Attendance: 6,000
Referee: Paulo Paraty (Portugal)

Club Brugge won 7–2 on aggregate.

29 September 1998
20:30 (CET)

Rapid Wien (Austria)	1–2	(France) Bordeaux
Wagner 42'	Report	Alicarte 28'; Diabaté 87'

Ernst-Happel-Stadion, Vienna
Attendance: 24,500
Referee: Miroslav Radoman (Yugoslavia)

Bordeaux won 3–2 on aggregate.

29 September 1998
20:30 (CET)

Obilić (Federal Republic of Yugoslavia)	0–1	(Spain) Atlético Madrid
	Report	Kiko 55'

Partizan Stadium, Belgrade
Attendance: 5,117
Referee: Jan Wegereef (Netherlands)

Atlético Madrid won 3–0 on aggregate.

29 September 1998
20:45 (CET)

Parma (Italy)	3–1	(Turkey) Fenerbahçe
Saffet 23' (o.g.); Crespo 45'; Boghossian 73'	Report	Baljić 59'

Stadio Ennio Tardini, Parma
Attendance: 12,480
Referee: Juan Fernández Marin (Spain)

Parma won 3–2 on aggregate.

29 September 1998
20:45 (CET)

Celtic (Scotland)	2–1	(Portugal) Vitória de Guimarães
Stubbs 38'; Larsson 90'	Report	Söderström 87'

Celtic Park, Glasgow
Attendance: 38,076
Referee: Oğuz Sarvan (Turkey)

Celtic won 4–2 on aggregate.

29 September 1998
20:45 (CET)

Roma (Italy)	1–0	(Denmark) Silkeborg
Delvecchio 53'	Report

Stadio Olimpico, Rome
Attendance: 21,247
Referee: Roelof Luinge (Netherlands)

Roma won 3–0 on aggregate.

29 September 1998
21:00 (CET)

Liverpool (England)	5–0	(Slovakia) Košice
Redknapp 22', 54'; Ince 51'; Fowler 52', 90'	Report

Anfield, Liverpool
Attendance: 23,792
Referee: Pascal Garibian (France)

Liverpool won 8–0 on aggregate.

29 September 1998
21:00 (CET)

Bayer Leverkusen (Germany)	1–0	(Italy) Udinese
Beinlich 77'	Report

BayArena, Leverkusen
Attendance: 22,500
Referee: Arturo Daudén Ibáñez (Spain)

Bayer Leverkusen won 2–1 on aggregate.

29 September 1998
21:05 (CET)

Lyon (France)	2–2	(England) Blackburn Rovers
Caveglia 3'; Grassi 36' (pen.)	Report	Pérez 26'; Flitcroft 56'

Stade de Gerland, Lyon
Attendance: 24,558
Referee: René Temmink (Netherlands)

Lyon won 3–2 on aggregate.

29 September 1998
21:15 (CET)

Celta Vigo (Spain)	7–0	(Romania) Argeş Piteşti
Penev 6', 13', 26'; Mazinho 16'; Sánchez 82'; Alberto Tomás 87', 90'	Report

Balaídos, Vigo
Attendance: 5,840
Referee: Alain Hamer (Luxembourg)

Celta de Vigo won 8–0 on aggregate.

29 September 1998
21:30 (CET)

Real Betis (Spain)	5–0	(Denmark) Vejle
Pérez 1', 20', 90'; George 71'; Fernando 74'	Report

Estadio Benito Villamarín, Seville
Attendance: 7,900
Referee: Eric Blareau (Belgium)

Real Betis won 5–1 on aggregate.

29 September 1998
21:30 (CET)

Valencia (Spain)	3–0	(Romania) Steaua Bucharest
Roche 52'; López 56'; Lucarelli 89'	Report

Mestalla Stadium, Valencia
Attendance: 16,500
Referee: Ryszard Wójcik (Poland)

Valencia won 7–3 on aggregate.

29 September 1998
22:00 (CET)

Marítimo (Portugal)	1–0 (a.e.t.)	(England) Leeds United
Jorge Soares 45'	Report
Penalties
Bunbury (penalty scored); Paulo Sérgio (penalty missed); Jorge Soares (penalty missed)	1–4	(penalty scored) Haaland; (penalty scored) Harte; (penalty scored) Granville; (penalty scored) Sharpe

Estádio dos Barreiros, Funchal
Attendance: 5,355
Referee: Fritz Stuchlik (Austria)

1–1 on aggregate; Leeds United won 4–1 on penalties.

1 October 1998
20:45 (CET)

Rangers (Scotland)	4–2	(Israel) Beitar Jerusalem
Gattuso 1'; Porrini 25'; Johansson 60'; Wallace 64'	Report	Sallói 33'; Ohana 80' (pen.)

Ibrox Stadium, Glasgow
Attendance: 45,610
Referee: Sergei Khusainov (Russia)

Rangers won 5–3 on aggregate.

== Second round ==
Team 1	Agg.	Team 2	1st leg	2nd leg
Dynamo Moscow (Russia)	2–6	(Spain) Real Sociedad	2–3	0–3
CSKA Sofia (Bulgaria)	2–5	(Spain) Atlético Madrid	2–4	0–1
Roma (Italy)	1–0	(England) Leeds United	1–0	0–0
Celtic (Scotland)	3–5	(Switzerland) Zürich	1–1	2–4
Grasshopper (Switzerland)	3–2	(Italy) Fiorentina	0–2	3–0^{1}
Vitesse (Netherlands)	1–3	(France) Bordeaux	0–1	1–2
Bayer Leverkusen (Germany)	2–3	(Scotland) Rangers	1–2	1–1
Wisła Kraków (Poland)	2–3	(Italy) Parma	1–1	1–2
GAK (Austria)	3–7	(France) Monaco	3–3	0–4
Werder Bremen (Germany)	3–4	(France) Marseille	1–1	2–3
Celta Vigo (Spain)	3–2	(England) Aston Villa	0–1	3–1
Liverpool (England)	2–2 (a)	(Spain) Valencia	0–0	2–2
Bologna (Italy)	4–1	(Czech Republic) Slavia Prague	2–1	2–0
Willem II (Netherlands)	1–4	(Spain) Real Betis	1–1	0–3
Red Star Belgrade (Federal Republic of Yugoslavia)	3–5	(France) Lyon	1–2	2–3
Stuttgart (Germany)	3–4	(Belgium) Club Brugge	1–1	2–3 (aet)

- ^{1} The return leg of the Grasshopper vs. Fiorentina tie was played at the Arechi Stadium in Salerno instead of Fiorentina's home ground in Florence due to the club serving a stadium ban over an incident during their 1996–97 Cup Winners' Cup semifinal second leg match against Barcelona on 24 April 1997. The incident saw Barcelona player Iván de la Peña requiring medical assistance after getting hit with an object thrown from the stands as Fiorentina fans pelted the pitch with missiles following Barcelona's second goal in the 35th minute of the match. Part of the punishment for Fiorentina was being required to play their next two European home matches at least 300 km away from their home stadium. Since Fiorentina failed to qualify for European competition in the 1997–98 season, the punishment was enacted during their 1998–99 UEFA Cup campaign.

=== First leg ===
20 October 1998
14:30 (CET)

Wisła Kraków (Poland)	1–1	(Italy) Parma
Kulawik 68'	Report	Chiesa 2'

Stadion Miejski, Kraków
Attendance: 10,000
Referee: Marcel Lică (Romania)

20 October 1998
17:00 (CET)

Bologna (Italy)	2–1	(Czech Republic) Slavia Prague
Signori 51'; Ingesson 85'	Report	Dostálek 67'

Stadio Renato Dall'Ara, Bologna
Attendance: 4,795
Referee: Sergei Khusainov (Russia)

20 October 1998
17:30 (CET)

Red Star Belgrade (Federal Republic of Yugoslavia)	1–2	(France) Lyon
Škorić 59' (pen.)	Report	Grassi 69'; Kanouté 84'

Stadionul Cotroceni, Bucharest
Attendance: 4,065
Referee: Eric Romain (Belgium)

20 October 1998
18:00 (CET)

Dynamo Moscow (Russia)	2–3	(Spain) Real Sociedad
Nekrasov 72', 73'	Report	Kovtun 3' (o.g.); De Pedro 11', 34' (pen.)

Dynamo Stadium, Moscow
Attendance: 8,000
Referee: Dieter Schoch (Switzerland)

20 October 1998
18:15 (CET)

GAK (Austria)	3–3	(France) Monaco
Akwuegbu 26', 57'; Ehmann 90'	Report	Špehar 18', 60'; Giuly 78'

Arnold Schwarzenegger-Stadion, Graz
Attendance: 15,400
Referee: Jorge Coroado (Portugal)

20 October 1998
19:00 (CET)

Grasshopper (Switzerland)	0–2	(Italy) Fiorentina
	Report	Batistuta 20'; Robbiati 48'

Hardturm, Zürich
Attendance: 16,080
Referee: Graham Poll (England)

20 October 1998
19:00 (CET)

Stuttgart (Germany)	1–1	(Belgium) Club Brugge
Akpoborie 8'	Report	Vermant 70'

Gottlieb-Daimler-Stadion, Stuttgart
Attendance: 11,750
Referee: Rune Pedersen (Norway)

20 October 1998
19:15 (CET)

CSKA Sofia (Bulgaria)	2–4	(Spain) Atlético Madrid
Genchev 53'; Naydenov 88'	Report	Torrisi 41'; Kiko 43', 87'; Roberto 75'

Balgarska Armia Stadium, Sofia
Attendance: 21,000
Referee: Georg Dardenne (Germany)

20 October 1998
19:30 (CET)

Vitesse (Netherlands)	0–1	(France) Bordeaux
	Report	Wiltord 44'

GelreDome, Arnhem
Attendance: 16,500
Referee: Fiorenzo Treossi (Italy)

20 October 1998
20:00 (CET)

Willem II (Netherlands)	1–1	(Spain) Real Betis
Bombarda 86'	Report	Trujillo 85'

Koning Willem II Stadion, Tilburg
Attendance: 14,228
Referee: William Young (Scotland)

22 October 1998
20:30 (CET)

Bayer Leverkusen (Germany)	1–2	(Scotland) Rangers
Reichenberger 90'	Report	van Bronckhorst 45'; Johansson 64'

BayArena, Leverkusen
Attendance: 22,500
Referee: Claus Bo Larsen (Denmark)

20 October 1998
20:45 (CET)

Roma (Italy)	1–0	(England) Leeds United
Delvecchio 17'	Report

Stadio Olimpico, Rome
Attendance: 41,892
Referee: Antonio Jesús López Nieto (Spain)

20 October 1998
20:45 (CET)

Werder Bremen (Germany)	1–1	(France) Marseille
Herzog 69'	Report	Maurice 67'

Weser-Stadion, Bremen
Attendance: 22,680
Referee: Miroslav Radoman (Yugoslavia)

20 October 1998
20:45 (CET)

Liverpool (England)	0–0	(Spain) Valencia
	Report

Anfield, Liverpool
Attendance: 26,004
Referee: Livio Bazzoli (Italy)

20 October 1998
21:00 (CET)

Celtic (Scotland)	1–1	(Switzerland) Zürich
Brattbakk 23'	Report	Fischer 78'

Celtic Park, Glasgow
Attendance: 44,121
Referee: Vasyl Melnychuk (Ukraine)

20 October 1998
21:15 (CET)

Celta Vigo (Spain)	0–1	(England) Aston Villa
	Report	Joachim 15'

Balaídos, Vigo
Attendance: 20,530
Referee: Oğuz Sarvan (Turkey)

=== Second leg ===
3 November 1998
16:30 (CET)

Slavia Prague (Czech Republic)	0–2	(Italy) Bologna
	Report	Signori 80'; Cappioli 85'

Stadion Eden, Prague
Attendance: 8,827
Referee: Georgios Bikas (Greece)

Bologna won 4–1 on aggregate.

3 November 1998
19:00 (CET)

Bordeaux (France)	2–1	(Netherlands) Vitesse
Micoud 9'; Wiltord 85'	Report	Jochemsen 8'

Stade du Parc Lescure, Bordeaux
Attendance: 14,764
Referee: Juan Ansuátegui Roca (Spain)

Bordeaux won 3–1 on aggregate.

3 November 1998
19:00 (CET)

Parma (Italy)	2–1	(Poland) Wisła Kraków
Fiore 21'; Zając 47' (o.g.)	Report	Zając 90'

Stadio Ennio Tardini, Parma
Attendance: 8,983
Referee: Alain Hamer (Luxembourg)

Parma won 3–2 on aggregate.

3 November 1998
19:00 (CET)

Club Brugge (Belgium)	3–2 (a.e.t.)	(Germany) Stuttgart
De Cock 60'; Claessens 105'; Ilić 115'	Report	Verlaat 76'; Bobic 109'

Jan Breydel Stadium, Bruges
Attendance: 11,384
Referee: Atanas Uzunov (Bulgaria)

Club Brugge won 4–3 on aggregate.

3 November 1998
19:45 (CET)

Monaco (France)	4–0	(Austria) GAK
Gava 9', 66'; Špehar 16'; Diawara 55'	Report

Stade Louis II, Monaco
Attendance: 6,810
Referee: Leslie Irvine (Northern Ireland)

Monaco won 7–3 on aggregate.

3 November 1998
20:00 (CET)

Real Sociedad (Spain)	3–0	(Russia) Dynamo Moscow
Kovačević 56', 76'; De Paula 70'	Report

Anoeta, San Sebastián
Attendance: 22,855
Referee: Terje Hauge (Norway)

Real Sociedad won 6–2 on aggregate.

3 November 1998
20:15 (CET)

Zürich (Switzerland)	4–2	(Scotland) Celtic
Del Signore 51'; Chassot 55'; Bartlett 61'; Sant'Anna 75'	Report	O'Donnell 53'; Larsson 72'

Letzigrund, Zürich
Attendance: 15,500
Referee: Leif Sundell (Sweden)

Zürich won 5–3 on aggregate.

3 November 1998
20:15 (CET)

Lyon (France)	3–2	(Federal Republic of Yugoslavia) Red Star Belgrade
Caveglia 16', 43'; Cocard 41'	Report	Bunjevčević 31'; Ognjenović 90'

Stade de Gerland, Lyon
Attendance: 22,508
Referee: Juan Fernández Marin (Spain)

Lyon won 5–3 on aggregate.

3 November 1998
20:45 (CET)

Fiorentina (Italy)	0–3 (awarded)	(Switzerland) Grasshopper
Oliveira 12', 39'	Report	Gren 31'

Stadio Arechi, Salerno
Attendance: 4,000
Referee: Michel Piraux (Belgium)

The match was abandoned at half-time after the fourth official, Philippe Flament of Belgium, sustained a knee injury and bruising from a firecracker thrown onto the pitch by fans in the stands. At the moment of the incident, Fiorentina led 2–1 on the night and 4-1 on aggregate. Four days later at a UEFA emergency meeting, Fiorentina was kicked out of the UEFA Cup and the match was recorded as a 0–3 Grasshopper win. Future expulsion from European competition for Fiorentina was also considered by UEFA but eventually ruled out because of mitigating circumstances, specifically that the match, as part of an earlier punishment, was not played at Fiorentina's home stadium but in Salerno and credible evidence that the firecracker was likely thrown by fans of the local club Salernitana holding a grudge following a recent Serie A fixture between the two clubs.
Grasshopper won 3–2 on aggregate.

3 November 1998
20:45 (CET)

Aston Villa (England)	1–3	(Spain) Celta Vigo
Collymore 30' (pen.)	Report	Sánchez 26'; Mostovoi 34'; Penev 48'

Villa Park, Birmingham
Attendance: 29,910
Referee: Armand Ancion (Belgium)

Celta de Vigo won 3–2 on aggregate.

3 November 1998
21:00 (CET)

Marseille (France)	3–2	(Germany) Werder Bremen
Maurice 36'; Issa 52'; Dugarry 77'	Report	Eilts 48'; Herzog 82'

Stade Vélodrome, Marseille
Attendance: 43,490
Referee: Paul Durkin (England)

Marseille won 4–3 on aggregate.

3 November 1998
21:05 (CET)

Leeds United (England)	0–0	(Italy) Roma
	Report

Elland Road, Leeds
Attendance: 39,161
Referee: Bernd Heynemann (Germany)

Roma won 1–0 on aggregate.

3 November 1998
21:30 (CET)

Atlético Madrid (Spain)	1–0	(Bulgaria) CSKA Sofia
Juninho 45' (pen.)	Report

Vicente Calderón, Madrid
Attendance: 28,000
Referee: Luc Huyghe (Belgium)

Atlético Madrid won 5–2 on aggregate.

3 November 1998
21:30 (CET)

Valencia (Spain)	2–2	(England) Liverpool
López 45', 90'	Report	McManaman 80'; Berger 85'

Mestalla Stadium, Valencia
Attendance: 41,500
Referee: Gilles Veissière (France)

2–2 on aggregate; Liverpool won on away goals.

3 November 1998
21:30 (CET)

Real Betis (Spain)	3–0	(Netherlands) Willem II
George 29'; Benjamín 56'; Fernando 89'	Report

Estadio Benito Villamarín, Seville
Attendance: 8,159
Referee: Jacek Granat (Poland)

Real Betis won 4–1 on aggregate.

5 November 1998
20:45 (CET)

Rangers (Scotland)	1–1	(Germany) Bayer Leverkusen
Johansson 56'	Report	Kirsten 78'

Ibrox Stadium, Glasgow
Attendance: 50,012
Referee: Lucílio Batista (Portugal)

Rangers won 3–2 on aggregate.

== Third round ==
Team 1	Agg.	Team 2	1st leg	2nd leg
Real Sociedad (Spain)	3–5	(Spain) Atlético Madrid	2–1	1–4 (aet)
Roma (Italy)	3–2	(Switzerland) Zürich	1–0	2–2
Grasshopper (Switzerland)	3–3 (a)	(France) Bordeaux	3–3	0–0
Rangers (Scotland)	2–4	(Italy) Parma	1–1	1–3
Monaco (France)	2–3	(France) Marseille	2–2	0–1
Celta Vigo (Spain)	4–1	(England) Liverpool	3–1	1–0
Bologna (Italy)	4–2	(Spain) Real Betis	4–1	0–1
Lyon (France)	5–3	(Belgium) Club Brugge	1–0	4–3

=== First leg ===
24 November 1998
16:00 (CET)

Roma (Italy)	1–0	(Switzerland) Zürich
Totti 90' (pen.)	Report

Stadio Olimpico, Rome
Attendance: 19,358
Referee: William Young (Scotland)

24 November 1998
18:30 (CET)

Grasshopper (Switzerland)	3–3	(France) Bordeaux
Kavelashvili 20'; Türkyilmaz 32'; Comisetti 53'	Report	Wiltord 5', 73'; Micoud 19'

Letzigrund, Zürich
Attendance: 7,200
Referee: Atanas Uzunov (Bulgaria)

24 November 1998
18:30 (CET)

Bologna (Italy)	4–1	(Spain) Real Betis
Fontolan 25', 74'; Kolyvanov 52'; Eriberto 59'	Report	Benjamín 63'

Stadio Renato Dall'Ara, Bologna
Attendance: 15,000
Referee: Claus Bo Larsen (Denmark)

24 November 1998
19:45 (CET)

Real Sociedad (Spain)	2–1	(Spain) Atlético Madrid
Kovačević 45'; Roberto 85' (o.g.)	Report	Juninho 3'

Anoeta, San Sebastián
Attendance: 24,431
Referee: Graham Poll (England)

24 November 1998
20:00 (CET)

Lyon (France)	1–0	(Belgium) Club Brugge
Bąk 45'	Report

Stade de Gerland, Lyon
Attendance: 20,178
Referee: Václav Krondl (Czech Republic)

24 November 1998
20:30 (CET)

Monaco (France)	2–2	(France) Marseille
Trezeguet 17' (pen.); Giuly 56'	Report	Pires 10'; Camara 39'

Stade Louis II, Monaco
Attendance: 14,710
Referee: Armand Ancion (Belgium)

24 November 1998
20:45 (CET)

Rangers (Scotland)	1–1	(Italy) Parma
Wallace 68'	Report	Balbo 21'

Ibrox Stadium, Glasgow
Attendance: 49,514
Referee: Alain Sars (France)

24 November 1998
21:35 (CET)

Celta Vigo (Spain)	3–1	(England) Liverpool
Mostovoi 49'; Karpin 56'; Gudelj 90'	Report	Owen 35'

Balaídos, Vigo
Attendance: 24,600
Referee: Georgios Bikas (Greece)

=== Second leg ===
8 December 1998
14:30 (CET)

Parma (Italy)	3–1	(Scotland) Rangers
Balbo 47'; Fiore 63'; Chiesa 67' (pen.)	Report	Albertz 29'

Stadio Ennio Tardini, Parma
Attendance: 15,437
Referee: Terje Hauge (Norway)

Parma won 4–2 on aggregate.

8 December 1998
19:00 (CET)

Real Betis (Spain)	1–0	(Italy) Bologna
Oli 4'	Report

Estadio Benito Villamarín, Seville
Attendance: 6,553
Referee: Miroslav Radoman (Yugoslavia)

Bologna won 4–2 on aggregate.

8 December 1998
19:00 (CET)

Club Brugge (Belgium)	3–4	(France) Lyon
De Brul 63'; De Cock 69'; Anić 73'	Report	Caveglia 16', 55', 72'; Dhorasoo 4'

Jan Breydel Stadium, Bruges
Attendance: 13,160
Referee: Antonio Jesús López Nieto (Spain)

Lyon won 5–3 on aggregate.

8 December 1998
19:30 (CET)

Bordeaux (France)	0–0	(Switzerland) Grasshopper
	Report

Stade du Parc Lescure, Bordeaux
Attendance: 19,407
Referee: Ryszard Wójcik (Poland)

3–3 on aggregate; Bordeaux won on away goals.

8 December 1998
20:45 (CET)

Zürich (Switzerland)	2–2	(Italy) Roma
Bartlett 60', 79'	Report	Delvecchio 14'; Totti 90'

Letzigrund, Zürich
Attendance: 15,200
Referee: Manuel Díaz Vega (Spain)

Roma won 3–2 on aggregate.

8 December 1998
20:45 (CET)

Liverpool (England)	0–1	(Spain) Celta Vigo
	Report	Revivo 57'

Anfield, Liverpool
Attendance: 30,289
Referee: Hartmut Strampe (Germany)

Celta de Vigo won 4–1 on aggregate.

8 December 1998
21:00 (CET)

Marseille (France)	1–0	(France) Monaco
Camara 71'	Report

Stade Vélodrome, Marseille
Attendance: 48,853
Referee: Piero Ceccarini (Italy)

Marseille won 3–2 on aggregate.

8 December 1998
21:30 (CET)

Atlético Madrid (Spain)	4–1 (a.e.t.)	(Spain) Real Sociedad
Jugović 16', 45' (pen.); Santi 96'; José Mari 98'	Report	Gracia 51'

Vicente Calderón Stadium, Madrid
Attendance: 37,000
Referee: Vítor Melo Pereira (Portugal)

Atlético Madrid won 5–3 on aggregate.

== Quarter-finals ==
Team 1	Agg.	Team 2	1st leg	2nd leg
Atlético Madrid (Spain)	4–2	(Italy) Roma	2–1	2–1
Bordeaux (France)	2–7	(Italy) Parma	2–1	0–6
Marseille (France)	2–1	(Spain) Celta Vigo	2–1	0–0
Bologna (Italy)	3–2	(France) Lyon	3–0	0–2

=== First leg ===
2 March 1999
17:30 (CET)

Bologna (Italy)	3–0	(France) Lyon
Signori 8', 49'; Binotto 55'	Report

Stadio Renato Dall'Ara, Bologna
Attendance: 19,545
Referee: Paul Durkin (England)

2 March 1999
19:30 (CET)

Bordeaux (France)	2–1	(Italy) Parma
Micoud 40'; Wiltord 45'	Report	Crespo 85'

Stade du Parc Lescure, Bordeaux
Attendance: 31,500
Referee: Vítor Melo Pereira (Portugal)

2 March 1999
21:15 (CET)

Marseille (France)	2–1	(Spain) Celta Vigo
Maurice 33', 68'	Report	Mostovoi 64'

Stade Vélodrome, Marseille
Attendance: 54,137
Referee: Dick Jol (Netherlands)

2 March 1999
21:30 (CET)

Atlético Madrid (Spain)	2–1	(Italy) Roma
José Mari 13'; Roberto 46'	Report	Di Biagio 75'

Vicente Calderón Stadium, Madrid
Attendance: 33,000
Referee: Alain Sars (France)

=== Second leg ===
16 March 1999
18:30 (CET)

Parma (Italy)	6–0	(France) Bordeaux
Crespo 37', 66'; Chiesa 43', 59'; Sensini 48'; Balbo 89' (pen.)	Report

Stadio Ennio Tardini, Parma
Attendance: 16,400
Referee: Rune Pedersen (Norway)

Parma won 7–2 on aggregate.

16 March 1999
20:30 (CET)

Lyon (France)	2–0	(Italy) Bologna
Caveglia 16'; Job 39'	Report

Stade de Gerland, Lyon
Attendance: 39,501
Referee: Manuel Díaz Vega (Spain)

Bologna won 3–2 on aggregate.

16 March 1999
21:30 (CET)

Roma (Italy)	1–2	(Spain) Atlético Madrid
Delvecchio 32'	Report	Aguilera 58'; Roberto 89'

Stadio Olimpico, Rome
Attendance: 64,485
Referee: Mario van der Ende (Netherlands)

Atlético Madrid won 4–2 on aggregate.

16 March 1999
21:45 (CET)

Celta Vigo (Spain)	0–0	(France) Marseille
	Report

Balaídos, Vigo
Attendance: 19,916
Referee: Pierluigi Collina (Italy)

Marseille won 2–1 on aggregate.

== Semi-finals ==
Team 1	Agg.	Team 2	1st leg	2nd leg
Atlético Madrid (Spain)	2–5	(Italy) Parma	1–3	1–2
Marseille (France)	1–1 (a)	(Italy) Bologna	0–0	1–1

=== First leg ===
6 April 1999
20:45 (CET)

Marseille (France)	0–0	(Italy) Bologna
	Report

Stade Vélodrome, Marseille
Attendance: 58,950
Referee: Ryszard Wójcik (Poland)

6 April 1999
21:30 (CET)

Atlético Madrid (Spain)	1–3	(Italy) Parma
Juninho 21' (pen.)	Report	Chiesa 13', 40'; Crespo 62'

Vicente Calderón Stadium, Madrid
Attendance: 42,000
Referee: Nikolai Levnikov (Russia)

=== Second leg ===
20 April 1999
19:30 (CET)

Bologna (Italy)	1–1	(France) Marseille
Paramatti 18'	Report	Blanc 86' (pen.)

Stadio Renato Dall'Ara, Bologna
Attendance: 38,000
Referee: Markus Merk (Germany)

1–1 on aggregate; Marseille won on away goals.

20 April 1999
21:30 (CET)

Parma (Italy)	2–1	(Spain) Atlético Madrid
Balbo 35'; Chiesa 83'	Report	Roberto 63'

Stadio Ennio Tardini, Parma
Attendance: 9,872
Referee: Paul Durkin (England)

Parma won 5–2 on aggregate.

== Final ==
12 May 1999
22:00 MSD (UTC+4)

Parma (Italy)	3–0	(France) Marseille
Crespo 25'; Vanoli 36'; Chiesa 55'	Report

Luzhniki Stadium, Moscow
Attendance: 61,000
Referee: Hugh Dallas (Scotland)

== See also ==
- 1998–99 UEFA Champions League
- 1998–99 UEFA Cup Winners' Cup
- 1998 UEFA Intertoto Cup
