= Vogrinčič =

Vogrinčič (also rendered as Vogrincic without diacritics) is a Slovene surname, primarily found in Mura. Notable people with the surname include:

- Enzo Vogrincic (born 1993), Uruguayan actor
- Matej Andraž Vogrinčič (born 1970), Slovenian artist
- Sebastjan Vogrinčič (born 1976), Slovenian football midfielder
