= Tomasz Kulawik =

Polish footballer and manager

Personal information
- Full name: Tomasz Kulawik
- Date of birth: 4 May 1969 (age 57)
- Place of birth: Olkusz, Poland
- Height: 1.74 m (5 ft 9 in)
- Position: Midfielder

Youth career
- 1982–1988: Bolesław Bukowno

Senior career*
Years	Team	Apps	(Gls)
1988–1990	Zagłębie Sosnowiec	21	(2)
1988	→ Górnik Wojkowice (loan)		
1991–2002	Wisła Kraków	295	(61)
2001	→ Zagłębie Sosnowiec (loan)	11	(1)
2002–2003	Ruch Chorzów	10	(0)
2003–2004	Bolesław Bukowno		
2006–2008	Bolesław Bukowno		
2014–2016	Przebój Wolbrom		

International career
1998	Poland	2	(0)

Managerial career
- 2003–2004: Bolesław Bukowno (player-manager)
- 2005: Wisła Kraków
- 2007: Wisła Kraków II
- 2007–2012: Wisła Kraków (ME)
- 2010: Wisła Kraków (caretaker)
- 2012–2013: Wisła Kraków
- 2015–2016: Okocimski KS Brzesko
- 2017: Olimpia Zambrów
- 2017: Podhale Nowy Targ
- 2017: MKS Kluczbork
- * Club domestic league appearances and goals

Tomasz Kulawik (born 4 May 1969) is a Polish professional football manager and former player. He was most recently the manager of MKS Kluczbork.

== Club career ==
Kulawik was born in Olkusz. On the field, he played as a midfielder. In the Ekstraklasa, he played for Zaglebie Sosnowiec, Wisła Kraków, and Ruch Chorzow whom he played for 257 times and scored 37 goals. With Wisła Kraków he won the Ekstraklasa championship twice, in the 1998–99 and 2000–01 seasons. In addition, he contributed to the winning of the Polish Cup in 2001–02, Polish Super Cup in 2001 and the Polish League Cup in 2000–01.

== International career ==
Kulawik made two appearances for the Poland national team during 1998.

== Coaching career ==
After finishing his playing career, he joined the coaching staff of Wisła Kraków. After the dismissal of Jerzy Engel in 2005, he became a new coach of Wisła Kraków. Then he was the coach of Wisła Kraków reserve team and youth team in the Młoda Ekstraklasa.

== Honours ==
=== As a player ===
Wisła Kraków

- Ekstraklasa: 1998–99, 2000–01
- Polish Cup: 2001–02
- Polish League Cup: 2000–01
- Polish Super Cup: 2001

Individual

- UEFA Cup top goalscorer: 1998–99

=== As a manager ===
Wisła Kraków (ME)

- Młoda Ekstraklasa: 2007–08
