= Andreas Hermansson =

Swedish footballer

Personal information
- Full name: Andreas Hermansson
- Date of birth: September 1, 1973 (age 53)
- Place of birth: Umeå, Sweden
- Height: 1.80 m (5 ft 11 in)
- Position: Forward

Team information
- Current team: Umeå FC
- Number: 11

Youth career
- Sandåkerns SK

Senior career*
Years	Team	Apps	(Gls)
1991–1994	Umeå FC		
1995–1998	Trelleborgs FF		
1999–2000	IFK Göteborg		
2000–2002	Hammarby IF	63	(28)
2003	Enköpings SK	23	(8)
2004–2006	GIF Sundsvall	70	(18)
2007–2010	Umeå FC		
- * Club domestic league appearances and goals as of 18:13, 19 August 2009 (UTC) ‡ National team caps and goals as of 18:13, 19 August 2009 (UTC)

Andreas Hermansson (born January 8, 1973) is a Swedish former football player, who played as a forward for Allsvenskan clubs such as Trelleborgs FF, IFK Göteborg, Hammarby IF, Enköpings SK and GIF Sundsvall. Along with two stints at his hometown club Umeå FC.

He's mostly noticed for winning Allsvenskan in 2001 with Hammarby IF and runner-up league top goalscorer the same year.
