= Radim König =

Czech footballer (born 1977)

Personal information
- Date of birth: 3 May 1977 (age 49)
- Place of birth: Czechoslovakia
- Position: Midfielder

Senior career*
Years	Team	Apps	(Gls)
1994–2002	Sigma Olomouc	62	(3)
2001	→ Blšany (loan)	3	(0)
2001–2002	→ Jablonec (loan)	24	(0)
2002–2004	Jablonec	38	(2)
2004–2006	Sigma Olomouc	36	(1)

International career
1994	Czech Republic U18	2	(0)
1997	Czech Republic U20	2	(0)
1998	Czech Republic U21	1	(0)
- * Club domestic league appearances and goals

Radim König (born 3 May 1977) is a Czech footballer who played as a midfielder. He made over 150 appearances in the Czech First League between 1994 and 2007. He played for Sardice in the 2009/2010 season, Sigma Olomouc in the 2007/2008 season, and FK Jablonec in the 2001/2002 season.

== Career ==
König started his career with Sigma Olomouc.
