= Bogdan Zając =

Polish footballer

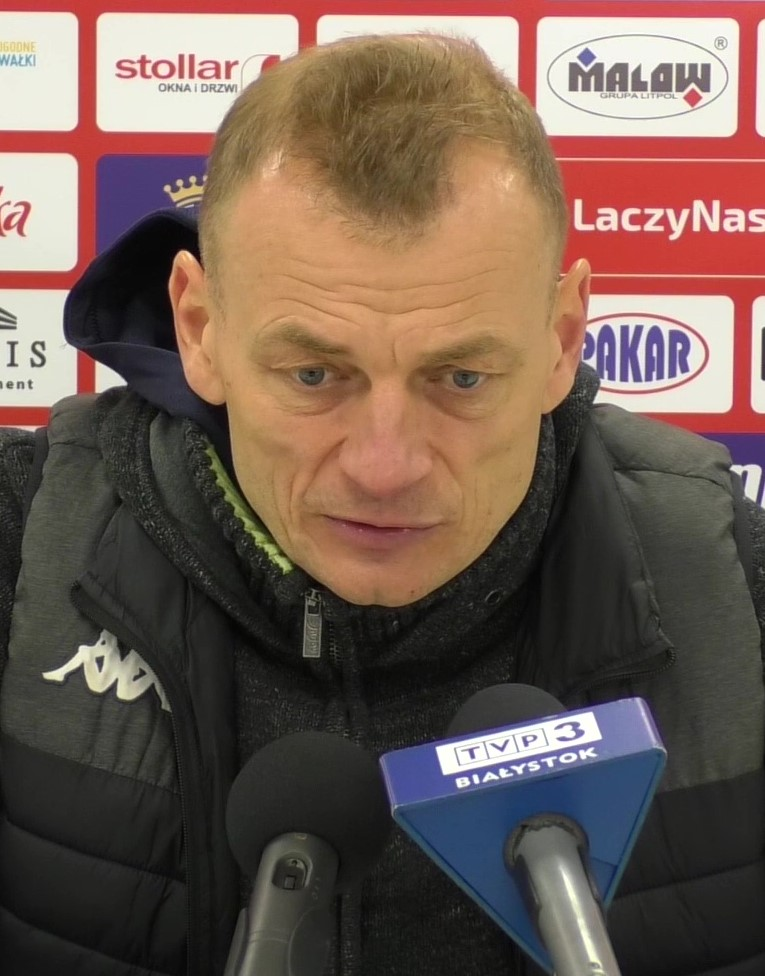
- Zając in 2021

Personal information
- Date of birth: 16 November 1972 (age 53)
- Place of birth: Jarosław, Poland
- Height: 1.88 m (6 ft 2 in)
- Position: Defender

Team information
- Current team: Kalwarianka Kalwaria Z. (manager)

Senior career*
| Years | Team | Apps | (Gls) |
| 1989–1994 | JKS 1909 Jarosław | | |
| 1994–1995 | Kamax Kańczuga | | |
| 1995–2002 | Wisła Kraków | 131 | (2) |
| 2002–2003 | Zagłębie Lubin | 26 | (0) |
| 2003 | Widzew Łódź | 5 | (0) |
| 2004 | FC Kärnten | 11 | (1) |
| 2004–2006 | Nea Salamis FC | 45 | (0) |
| 2006–2007 | Shenzhen Shangqingyin | 34 | (3) |
| 2008 | Hutnik Kraków | 10 | (0) |
| 2008–2009 | Skawinka Skawina | | |

International career
| 1998 | Poland | 1 | (0) |

Managerial career
- 2009: GKS Katowice (assistant)
- 2010–2013: Górnik Zabrze (assistant)
- 2013: Górnik Zabrze (caretaker)
- 2013–2018: Poland (assistant)
- 2018–2019: Lech Poznań (assistant)
- 2020–2021: Jagiellonia Białystok
- 2021–2022: KKS 1925 Kalisz
- 2022: Watra Białka Tatrzańska
- 2022–2023: Wisła Kraków (assistant)
- 2024–2025: JKS Jarosław
- 2026–: Kalwarianka Kalwaria Z.
- * Club domestic league appearances and goals

Bogdan Zając (born 16 November 1972) is a Polish professional football manager and former player. He is currently in charge of IV liga Lesser Poland club Kalwarianka Kalwaria Zebrzydowska. Zając made one appearance for the Poland national team against Slovakia in 1998.

== Managerial statistics ==
As of match played 19 June 2025

Managerial record by team and tenure
| Team | From | To | Record | | | | | | | |
| Team | From | To | G | W | D | L | GF | GA | GD | Win % |
|---|---|---|---|---|---|---|---|---|---|---|
| Górnik Zabrze (caretaker) | 31 October 2013 | 10 November 2013 | 2 | 1 | 0 | 1 | 4 | 5 | −1 | 50.00 |
| Jagiellonia Białystok | 31 July 2020 | 17 March 2021 | 22 | 7 | 4 | 11 | 27 | 36 | −9 | 31.82 |
| KKS 1925 Kalisz | 24 October 2021 | 2 May 2022 | 18 | 6 | 0 | 12 | 23 | 31 | −8 | 33.33 |
| Watra Białka Tatrzańska | 19 September 2022 | 5 October 2022 | 2 | 2 | 0 | 0 | 7 | 3 | +4 | 100.00 |
| JKS Jarosław | 1 July 2024 | 30 June 2025 | 37 | 27 | 3 | 7 | 88 | 31 | +57 | 72.97 |
| Kalwarianka Kalwaria Z. | 1 July 2026 | Present | 0 | 0 | 0 | 0 | 0 | 0 | +0 | — |
| Total | | | 81 | 43 | 7 | 31 | 149 | 106 | +43 | 53.09 |

== Honours ==
=== Player ===
Wisła Kraków

- Ekstraklasa: 1998–99, 2000–01
- Polish Cup: 2001–02
- Polish League Cup: 2000–01
- Polish Super Cup: 2001
