= Valentin Naydenov =

Bulgarian footballer

Valentin Naydenov Ivanov
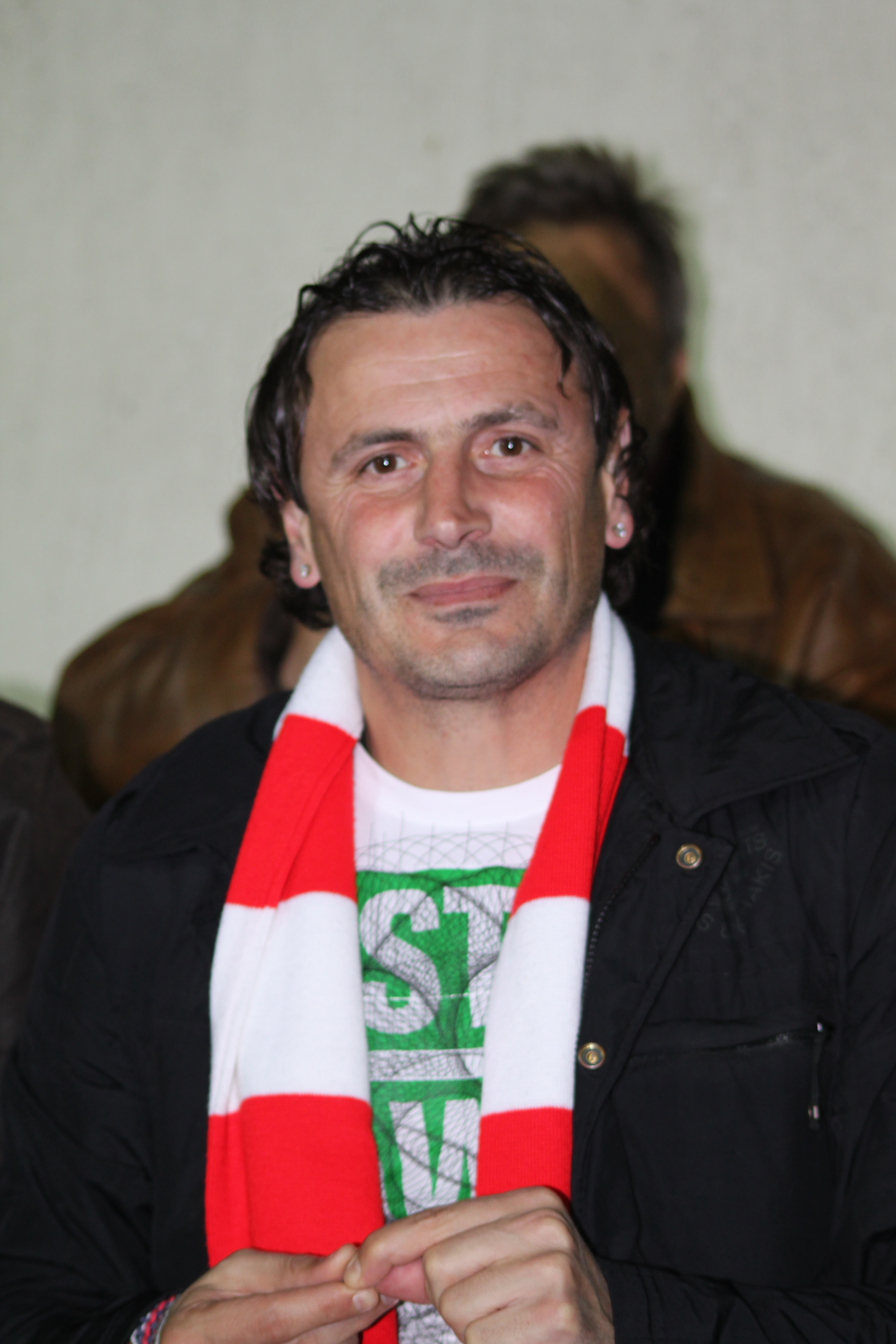

Personal information
- Date of birth: 27 July 1972 (age 54)
- Place of birth: Berkovitsa, Bulgaria
- Height: 1.81 m (5 ft 11 1/2 in)
- Position: Left back

Senior career*
Years	Team	Apps	(Gls)
1993-1994	Chernomorets Burgas		
1994-1995	Neftochimic Burgas		
1995-1998	Lokomotiv Sofia		
1998-1999	CSKA Sofia	11	(0)
1999-1999	Lokomotiv Sofia	15	(0)
2000-2002	Litex Lovech	26	(0)
2003-2004	Spartak Varna	11	(2)
2011	New Radiant	22	(6)

International career^{‡}
1998-99	Bulgaria	5	(0)
- * Club domestic league appearances and goals ‡ National team caps and goals as of 2021-12-27

Valentin Naydenov Ivanov (Bulgarian: Валентин Найденов Иванов) (born 27 July 1972) is a Bulgarian former footballer.

== Biography ==
Naydenov has played for numerous clubs in Bulgaria, including CSKA Sofia, Litex Lovech, Loko Sofia, Chernomorets Burgas, Neftochimic, Spartak Varna, Botev Vratsa, Loko Mezdra, Vihar Gorublyane, Slivnishki Geroy, Hebar Pazardzhik and Kom Berkovitsa.

He also had a successful spell with New Radiant from the Maldives. Naydenov has been capped for the national team.

He is married and has three children.
