= Grzegorz Pater =

Polish footballer

Personal information
- Date of birth: 5 May 1974 (age 52)
- Place of birth: Kraków, Poland
- Height: 1.77 m (5 ft 10 in)
- Position: Midfielder

Team information
- Current team: Wawel Kraków
- Number: 20

Youth career
- Wisła Kraków

Senior career*
Years	Team	Apps	(Gls)
1993–2003	Wisła Kraków	255	(37)
2004	Górnik Polkowice	11	(2)
2004–2008	Podbeskidzie Bielsko-Biała	127	(17)
2008–2009	Skawinka Skawina		
2010–2015	Podgórze Kraków		
2015–2016	Orzeł Ryczów		
2017	Podgórze Kraków		
2017–2019	Orzeł Ryczów	47	(6)
2019–2020	Podgórze Kraków	18	(19)
2021–	Wawel Kraków	20	(13)

International career
2001	Poland	1	(0)
- * Club domestic league appearances and goals as of 29 October 2024

Grzegorz Pater (born 5 March 1974) is a Polish footballer who plays as a midfielder for Wawel Kraków.

== Career ==
He formerly played for clubs like Wisła Kraków, Górnik Polkowice and Podbeskidzie Bielsko-Biała. He scored twice in a 2001–02 UEFA Champions League third qualification round match against Barcelona on 8 August 2001.

Pater made one appearance for the Poland national team against Iceland in 2001.

== Honours ==
Wisła Kraków

- Ekstraklasa: 1998–99, 2000–01, 2002–03
- Polish Cup: 2001–02, 2002–03
- Polish League Cup: 2000–01
- Polish Super Cup: 2001

Orzeł Ryczów

- Klasa A Wadowice: 2014–15
- Polish Cup (Wadowice District regionals): 2018–19
- Polish Cup (Wadowice regionals): 2017–18, 2018–19

Individual

- Polish League Cup top scorer: 2001–02
