= Sebastjan Vogrinčič =

Slovenian footballer

Personal information
- Date of birth: 7 August 1976 (age 50)
- Height: 1.70 m (5 ft 7 in)
- Position: Midfielder

Senior career*
Years	Team	Apps	(Gls)
1996–2004	Mura	175	(19)
2004–2006	Nafta Lendava	61	(9)
2006–2008	Stegersbach		
2009	Mura	12	(2)
2009	SV Bad Schwanberg	13	(1)
2010-2017	USV Neuhaus/Klausenbach	175	(65)
- * Club domestic league appearances and goals

Sebastjan Vogrinčič (born 7 August 1976) is a Slovenian retired football midfielder.
