= 1979 Malmö FF season =

Malmö FF
1979 season
- Chairman: Hans Cavalli-Björkman
- Head coach: Bob Houghton
- Stadium: Malmö Stadion
- Allsvenskan: 4th
- 1978–79 European Cup: Runners-up
- 1979–80 UEFA Cup: Second round
- Top goalscorer: Tommy Andersson (5)
Home colours

The 1979 season was Malmö FF's 68th in existence, their 46th season in Allsvenskan and their 43rd consecutive season in the league. They competed in Allsvenskan where they finished fourth, the 1978–79 European Cup where they finished as runners-up and the 1979–80 UEFA Cup where they were knocked out in the second round. Malmö FF also participated in two competitions in which the club continued playing in for the 1980 season, Svenska Cupen and the Intercontinental Cup. The season began with the first leg of the Quarter-finals of the European Cup on 7 March, league play started on 16 April and lasted until 28 October. The season ended with the first leg of the Intercontinental Cup on 18 November.

For the first time in the club's history, Malmö FF reached the final of the European Cup. They were defeated 1-0 by English team Nottingham Forest. As Forest turned down the chance to play in the Intercontinental Cup, Malmö FF took their place, and faced Paraguayan side Olimpia. The South American club won 3-1 on aggregate.

== First-team squad ==
Squad at end of season

Note: Flags indicate national team as defined under FIFA eligibility rules; some limited exceptions apply. Players may hold more than one non-FIFA nationality.

No.	Pos.	Nation	Player
—	DF	SWE	Arne Åkesson
—	GK	SWE	Jan Möller
—	DF	SWE	Magnus Andersson
—	DF	SWE	Roland Andersson
—	DF	SWE	Roy Andersson
—	DF	SWE	Mats Arvidsson
—	DF	SWE	Ingemar Erlandsson
—	DF	SWE	Kent Jönsson
—	DF	SWE	Krister Kristensson
—	DF	SWE	Denny Petrusson
—	MF	SWE	Jan-Olov Kindvall
—	MF	SWE	Bo Larsson

No.	Pos.	Nation	Player
—	MF	SWE	Anders Ljungberg
—	MF	SWE	Claes Malmberg
—	MF	SWE	Björn Nilsson
—	MF	SWE	Robert Prytz
—	MF	SWE	Staffan Tapper (captain)
—	FW	SWE	Tommy Andersson
—	FW	SWE	Sanny Åslund
—	FW	SWE	Tore Cervin
—	FW	SWE	Tommy Hansson
—	FW	SWE	Ulf Mårtensson
—	FW	SWE	Anders Ohlsson

== Competitions ==
=== Allsvenskan ===
==== League table ====
Pos	Team	Pld	W	D	L	GF	GA	GD	Pts	Qualification or relegation
2	IFK Göteborg	26	13	9	4	44	24	+20	35	Qualification to UEFA Cup first round
3	IF Elfsborg	26	14	5	7	35	24	+11	33	Qualification to UEFA Cup first round
4	Malmö FF	26	12	8	6	30	24	+6	32	Qualification to Cup Winners' Cup first round (Note: Malmö FF qualified for the European Cup Winners' Cup as Svenska Cupen champions 1979–80.)
5	IFK Norrköping	26	11	9	6	44	28	+16	31	
6	Hammarby IF	26	11	6	9	46	36	+10	28	

Source: "Swedish Football Tables - List of final tables". RSSSF. 2011.
Rules for classification: 1) points; 2) goal difference; 3) number of goals scored.

==== Matches ====
16 April 1979 Round 1	Malmö FF	1 – 0	Hammarby IF	Malmö
				Stadium: Malmö Stadion

28 April 1979 Round 2	Kalmar FF	0 – 1	Malmö FF	Kalmar
				Stadium: Fredriksskans

3 May 1979 Round 3	Malmö FF	3 – 0	IF Elfsborg	Malmö
				Stadium: Malmö Stadion

6 May 1979 Round 4	IFK Norrköping	1 – 0	Malmö FF	Norrköping
				Stadium: Idrottsparken

14 May 1979 Round 5	Malmö FF	2 – 2	Halmstads BK	Malmö
				Stadium: Malmö Stadion

17 May 1979 Round 6	IFK Sundsvall	1 – 2	Malmö FF	Sundsvall
				Stadium: Idrottsparken

21 May 1979 Round 7	IS Halmia	1 – 1	Malmö FF	Halmstad
				Stadium: Örjans Vall

4 June 1979 Round 9	Landskrona BoIS	0 – 1	Malmö FF	Landskrona
				Stadium: Landskrona IP

13 June 1979 Round 10	Malmö FF	0 – 2	Östers IF	Malmö
				Stadium: Malmö Stadion

18 June 1979 Round 11	Åtvidabergs FF	0 – 0	Malmö FF	Åtvidaberg
				Stadium: Kopparvallen

21 June 1979 Round 8	Malmö FF	0 – 4	IFK Göteborg	Malmö
				Stadium: Malmö Stadion

25 June 1979 Round 12	Malmö FF	0 – 0	AIK	Malmö
				Stadium: Malmö Stadion

4 July 1979 Round 13	Djurgårdens IF	0 – 1	Malmö FF	Stockholm
				Stadium: Stockholms Stadion

18 July 1979 Round 14	Malmö FF	1 – 0	Djurgårdens IF	Malmö
				Stadium: Malmö Stadion

1 August 1979 Round 15	AIK	1 – 1	Malmö FF	Solna
				Stadium: Råsunda

9 August 1979 Round 16	Malmö FF	2 – 0	Åtvidabergs FF	Malmö
				Stadium: Malmö Stadion

20 August 1979 Round 17	Halmstads BK	1 – 1	Malmö FF	Halmstad
				Stadium: Örjans Vall

23 August 1979 Round 18	Malmö FF	3 – 0	IFK Sundsvall	Malmö
				Stadium: Malmö Stadion

30 August 1979 Round 19	Östers IF	2 – 0	Malmö FF	Växjö
				Stadium: Värendsvallen

10 September 1979 Round 20	Malmö FF	3 – 1	Landskrona BoIS	Malmö
				Stadium: Malmö Stadion

13 September 1979 Round 21	IFK Göteborg	1 – 1	Malmö FF	Gothenburg
				Stadium: Ullevi

23 September 1979 Round 22	Malmö FF	3 – 0	IS Halmia	Malmö
				Stadium: Malmö Stadion

30 September 1979 Round 23	Malmö FF	0 – 3	Kalmar FF	Malmö
				Stadium: Malmö Stadion

14 October 1979 Round 24	Hammarby IF	0 – 1	Malmö FF	Stockholm
				Stadium: Söderstadion

20 October 1979 Round 25	Malmö FF	1 – 1	IFK Norrköping	Malmö
				Stadium: Malmö Stadion

28 October 1979 Round 26	IF Elfsborg	3 – 1	Malmö FF	Borås
				Stadium: Ryavallen

=== Svenska Cupen ===
The tournament continued into the 1980 season.

25 July 1979 Fourth round	IF Brommapojkarna	0 – 4	Malmö FF	Stockholm

26 August 1979 Fifth round	Malmö FF	2 – 1 (a.e.t.)	IF Elfsborg	Malmö
				Stadium: Malmö Stadion

17 October 1979 Sixth round	Malmö FF	3 – 0	Västerås SK	Malmö
				Stadium: Malmö Stadion

=== European Cup ===
The tournament continued from the 1978 season.

==== Quarter-finals ====
7 March 1979 First Leg	Wisła Kraków (Poland)	2 – 1	(Sweden) Malmö FF	Kraków, Poland
	Nawałka 26'; Kmiecik 85'	Report	Hansson 13'	Stadium: Stadion Miejski

21 March 1979 Second Leg	Malmö FF (Sweden)	4 – 1 (5 – 3 agg.)	(Poland) Wisła Kraków	Malmö, Sweden
	Ljungberg 65' (pen.), 72', 90' (pen.); Cervin 82'	Report	Kmiecik 58'	Stadium: Malmö Stadion

==== Semi-finals ====
11 April 1979 First Leg	Austria Vienna	0 – 0	(Sweden) Malmö FF	Vienna, Austria
		Report		Stadium: Ernst-Happel-Stadion

25 April 1979 Second Leg	Malmö FF (Sweden)	1 – 0 (1 – 0 agg.)	Austria Vienna	Malmö, Sweden
	Hansson 47'	Report		Stadium: Malmö Stadion

==== Final ====
30 May 1979 Final	Malmö FF (Sweden)	0 – 1	(England) Nottingham Forest	Munich, West Germany
20:15 CEST		Report	Francis 45'	Stadium: Olympic Stadium; Attendance: 57,500; Referee: Erich Linemayr (Austria)

=== UEFA Cup ===
==== First round ====
19 September 1979 First Leg	KPT Kuopio (Finland)	1 – 2	(Sweden) Malmö FF	Kuopio, Finland
				Stadium: Väinölänniemen stadion

3 October 1979 Second Leg	Malmö FF (Sweden)	2 – 0 (4 – 1 agg.)	(Finland) KPT Kuopio	Malmö, Sweden
				Stadium: Malmö IP

==== Second round ====
24 October 1979 First Leg	Feyenoord (Netherlands)	4 – 0	(Sweden) Malmö FF	Rotterdam, Netherlands
				Stadium: Stadion Feijenoord

7 November 1979 Second Leg	Malmö FF (Sweden)	1 – 1 (1 – 5 agg.)	(Netherlands) Feyenoord	Malmö, Sweden
				Stadium: Malmö IP

=== Intercontinental Cup ===
The tournament continued into the 1980 season.

18 November 1979 First Leg	Malmö FF (Sweden)	0 – 1	(Paraguay) Olimpia	Malmö, Sweden
			Isasi 41'	Stadium: Malmö Stadion; Attendance: 5,000
