= 1978 Svenska Cupen final =

- Event: 1977–78 Svenska Cupen
Malmö FF	Kalmar FF
2	0
- After extra time
- Date: 4 November 1978
- Venue: Strandängens IP, Bromölla
- Referee: Lars-Åke Björck (Partille)
- Attendance: 4,813

The 1978 Svenska Cupen final took place on 4 November 1978 at Strandängens IP in Bromölla. The match was contested by Allsvenskan sides Malmö FF and Kalmar FF. Kalmar FF played their first cup final ever, Malmö FF played their first final since 1975 and their 12th final in total. Malmö FF won their 10th title with a 2–0 victory after extra time.

== Match details ==
4 November 1978

Malmö FF	2–0 (a.e.t.)	Kalmar FF
Erlandsson 96'; Hansson 107'

Strandängens IP, Bromölla
Attendance: 4,813
Referee: Lars-Åke Björck (Partille)

Malmö FF	Kalmar FF

MALMÖ FF:
GK	(Sweden) Jan Möller
DF	(Sweden) Roland Andersson
DF	(Sweden) Krister Kristensson
DF	(Sweden) Roy Andersson
DF	(Sweden) Ingemar Erlandsson
MF	(Sweden) Magnus Andersson	(substituted off) 31'
MF	(Sweden) Staffan Tapper
MF	(Sweden) Anders Ljungberg
MF	(Sweden) Jan-Olov Kindvall
FW	(Sweden) Tore Cervin	(substituted off) 65'
FW	(Sweden) Bo Larsson
Substitutes:
MF	(Sweden) Claes Malmberg	(substituted in) 31'
FW	(Sweden) Tommy Hansson	(substituted in) 65'
Manager:
(England) Bob Houghton

KALMAR FF:
GK	(Sweden) Tony Ström
DF	(Sweden) Christer Hult	(substituted off) 70'
DF	(Sweden) Ulf Ohlsson
DF	(Sweden) Börje Axelsson
DF	(Sweden) Ronny Sörman
MF	(Sweden) Kenneth Bojstedt	(substituted off) 88'
MF	(Sweden) Kjell Nyberg
MF	(Sweden) Alf Nilsson
MF	(Sweden) Benno Magnusson
FW	(Sweden) Jan-Åke Lundberg
FW	(Sweden) Johny Erlandsson
Substitutes:
DF	(Sweden) Stig Andreasson	(substituted in) 70'
FW	(Sweden) Thomas Sunesson	(substituted in) 88'
Manager:
(Sweden) Bo Johansson
