= 1979 European Cup final =

- Match programme cover. The image is of Emlyn Hughes lifting the trophy the previous year for Liverpool.
- Event: 1978–79 European Cup
Malmö FF	Nottingham Forest
(Sweden)	(England)
0	1
- Date: 30 May 1979
- Venue: Olympiastadion, Munich
- Referee: Erich Linemayr (Austria)
- Attendance: 68,500

The 1979 European Cup final was a football match held at the Olympiastadion, Munich, on 30 May 1979. (Note: The venue was decided in Bern by the UEFA Executive Committee on 27 September 1978.) Trevor Francis scored the only goal of the match, as Nottingham Forest of England defeated Malmö FF of Sweden 1–0 to become European champions for the first time in club history. The win represented a third successive victory for an English side in the European Cup, after Liverpool's victories in 1977 and 1978.

== Background ==
The competition produced a final between two clubs that had not previously reached that stage. With two first-choice players – midfielder Bo Larsson and defender Roy Andersson – already ruled out with injury and with their captain and midfielder, Staffan Tapper, breaking his toe in training on the eve of the final, Malmö resorted to the same defensive tactics that Belgian team Club Bruges had used at Wembley in the final twelve months earlier. With neither of the finalists being one of Europe’s major clubs, Munich’s Olympiastadion was far from full for the Final, and the game itself was something of an anti-climax. There was, however, one memorable story still to be told. Back in February, Brian Clough had elected to spend the money that Forest had made from winning the league title in 1978 on a forward from Birmingham City. Clough made Trevor Francis Britain’s first £1 million footballer when he took him to Nottingham, but UEFA rules stipulated that he could not play European football for another three months. Therefore, the first game that Francis was eligible for was the final itself and, with Martin O'Neill injured and Archie Gemmill not selected by Clough, Francis was picked to play his first-ever European club game, albeit out on the right wing.

== Route to the final ==
Malmö FF			Round	Nottingham Forest
Opponent	Result	Legs		Opponent	Result	Legs
(France) Monaco	1–0	0–0 home; 1–0 away	First round	(England) Liverpool	2–0	2–0 home; 0–0 away
(Soviet Union) Dynamo Kiev	2–0	2–0 home; 0–0 away	Second round	(Greece) AEK Athens	7–2	5–1 home; 2–1 away
(Poland) Wisła Kraków	5–3	4–1 home; 1–2 away	Quarter-finals	(Switzerland) Grasshoppers	5–2	4–1 home; 1–1 away
Austria Wien	1–0	1–0 home; 0–0 away	Semi-finals	(West Germany) 1. FC Köln	4–3	3–3 home; 1–0 away

== Match summary ==
With Malmö opting to sit back in defence for the duration of the match, the game was merely about whether Forest could break through. Despite constant pressure, the English side had still failed to score as first half injury time began, but then John Robertson, a man who was now one of the most feared wingers in European football, beat two Swedish defenders on the left hand side before whipping in a cross. Goalkeeper Jan Möller, who had been solid up to this point, did not come out to clear the ball, and at the far post was none other than Trevor Francis to head the ball into the roof of the net. That was effectively the end of the match. Both Garry Birtles and Robertson missed good chances in the second half, but it did not matter, as Malmö never looked likely to score.

Under their maverick manager Brian Clough, Nottingham Forest, a relatively small English club, had won European club football’s winning prize, knocking out two-time defending champions Liverpool along the way. Just two years earlier, Forest had been in English football's second tier.

Nottingham Forest would retain their title the following year. To date, Malmö is the only club from a Nordic country to play in the European Cup or Champions League final.

== Match ==
=== Details ===
30 May 1979
20:15 CEST

Malmö FF (Sweden)	0–1	(England) Nottingham Forest
	Report	Francis 45+1'

Olympiastadion, Munich
Attendance: 68,500
Referee: Erich Linemayr (Austria)

Malmö FF	Nottingham Forest

GK	1	(Sweden) Jan Möller
RB	2	(Sweden) Roland Andersson
CB	4	(Sweden) Kent Jönsson
CB	5	(Sweden) Magnus Andersson
LB	3	(Sweden) Ingemar Erlandsson
RM	8	(Sweden) Robert Prytz
CM	6	(Sweden) Staffan Tapper (c)	(substituted off) 34'
CM	7	(Sweden) Anders Ljungberg
LM	11	(Sweden) Jan-Olov Kindvall
CF	10	(Sweden) Tore Cervin
CF	9	(Sweden) Tommy Hansson	(substituted off) 82'
Substitutes:
DF	12	(Sweden) Mats Arvidsson
FW	13	(Sweden) Tommy Andersson	(substituted on) 82'
MF	14	(Sweden) Claes Malmberg	(substituted on) 34'
GK	15	(Sweden) Arne Åkesson
Manager:
(England) Bob Houghton

GK	1	(England) Peter Shilton
RB	2	(England) Viv Anderson
CB	5	(England) Larry Lloyd
CB	6	(Scotland) Kenny Burns
LB	3	(England) Frank Clark
RM	7	(England) Trevor Francis
CM	4	(Scotland) John McGovern (c)
CM	8	(England) Ian Bowyer
LM	11	(Scotland) John Robertson
CF	9	(England) Garry Birtles
CF	10	(England) Tony Woodcock
Substitutes:
GK	12	(England) Chris Woods
DF	13	(England) David Needham
MF	14	(Northern Ireland) Martin O'Neill
MF	15	(Scotland) Archie Gemmill
FW	16	(Scotland) John O'Hare
Manager:
(England) Brian Clough

== See also ==
- 1979 Malmö FF season
- 1978–79 Nottingham Forest F.C. season
- 1979 European Cup Winners' Cup final
- 1979 European Super Cup
- 1979 UEFA Cup final
- Malmö FF in European football
- Nottingham Forest F.C. in European football
