= 1980 Svenska Cupen final =

- Event: 1979–80 Svenska Cupen
Malmö FF	IK Brage
3	3
- Malmö FF won 4–3 on penalties
- Date: 1 June 1980
- Venue: Råsunda, Solna
- Referee: Leif-Göte Enternäs (Västerås)
- Attendance: 6,172

The 1980 Svenska Cupen final took place on 1 June 1980 at Råsunda in Solna. The match was contested by Allsvenskan sides Malmö FF and IK Brage. Brage played their first cup final ever, Malmö FF played their first final since 1978 and their 13th final in total. Malmö FF won their 11th title with a 7–6 victory after extra time and penalties.

== Match details ==
1 June 1980

Malmö FF	3–3 (a.e.t.)	IK Brage
Sjöberg 54', 90'; Erlandsson 113'		Gustavsson 63'; Nilsson 85'; Arnberg 95'
Penalties
Prytz (penalty scored); Erlandsson (penalty scored); Hansson (penalty missed); Ohlsson (penalty scored); Sjöberg (penalty scored)	4–3	(penalty scored) Theorin; (penalty missed) Hagberg; (penalty missed) Zetterlund; (penalty scored) Gustavsson; (penalty scored) Arnberg

Råsunda, Solna
Attendance: 6,172
Referee: Leif-Göte Enternäs (Västerås)

Malmö FF	Brage

MALMÖ FF:
GK	(Sweden) Jan Möller
DF	(Sweden) Roland Andersson
DF	(Sweden) Kent Jönsson
DF	(England) Tim Parkin
DF	(Sweden) Mats Arvidsson	(substituted off) 119'
MF	(Sweden) Robert Prytz
MF	(Sweden) Magnus Andersson
MF	(Sweden) Thomas Sjöberg
MF	(Sweden) Ingemar Erlandsson
FW	(Sweden) Tommy Hansson
FW	(Sweden) Tore Cervin	(substituted off) 60'
Substitutes:
FW	(Sweden) Björn Nilsson	(substituted on) 60'
DF	(Sweden) Anders Ohlsson	(substituted on) 119'
Manager:
(England) Bob Houghton

IK BRAGE:
GK	(Sweden) Bernt Ljung
DF	(Sweden) Anders Fernström
DF	(Sweden) Göran Arnberg
DF	(Sweden) Jan Lindstedt
DF	(Sweden) Kent Hagberg
MF	(Sweden) Rolf Zetterlund
MF	(Sweden) Kenneth Gustavsson
MF	(Sweden) Lennart Åkerlund
MF	(Sweden) Thomas Nilsson (footballer)
FW	(England) Roger Hansson
FW	(Sweden) Lars Gyllenvåg	(substituted off) 62'
Substitutes:
FW	(Sweden) Nils-Erik Johansson	(substituted on) 62'	(substituted off) 119'
FW	(Sweden) Bo Theorin	(substituted on) 119'
Manager:
(Sweden) Rolf Zetterlund
