= 1986 Svenska Cupen final =

- Event: 1985–86 Svenska Cupen
Malmö FF	IFK Göteborg
2	1
- Date: 2 July 1986
- Venue: Råsunda, Solna
- Referee: Bo Helén (Uppsala)
- Attendance: 11,656

The 1986 Svenska Cupen final took place on 2 July 1986 at Råsunda in Solna. The match was contested by Allsvenskan sides Malmö FF and IFK Göteborg. IFK Göteborg played its first final since 1983 and its fourth final in total; Malmö FF played its first final since 1984 and its 15th final in total. Malmö FF won its 13th title with a 2–1 victory.

== Match details ==
2 July 1986

Malmö FF	2–1	IFK Göteborg
Nilsson 49'; Palmér 78'	Report	Andersson 75'

Råsunda, Solna
Attendance: 11,656
Referee: Bo Helén (Uppsala)

Malmö FF	IFK Göteborg

MALMÖ FF:
GK	(Sweden) Jan Möller
DF	(Sweden) Magnus Andersson
DF	(Sweden) Mats Arvidsson
DF	(Sweden) Hasse Borg	(substituted off) 78'
DF	(Sweden) Torbjörn Persson
MF	(Sweden) Jonas Thern
MF	(Sweden) Ingemar Erlandsson
MF	(Sweden) Leif Engqvist
MF	(Sweden) Anders Palmér	(substituted off) 84'
FW	(Sweden) Mats Magnusson
FW	(Sweden) Björn Nilsson
Substitutes:
DF	(Sweden) Kent Jönsson	(substituted in) 78'
FW	(Sweden) Håkan Lindman	(substituted in) 84'
Manager:
(England) Roy Hodgson

IFK GÖTEBORG:
GK	(Sweden) Thomas Wernersson
DF	(Sweden) Mats-Ola Carlsson
DF	(Sweden) Glenn Hysén
DF	(Sweden) Peter Larsson
DF	(Sweden) Stig Fredriksson
MF	(Sweden) Roland Nilsson
MF	(Sweden) Magnus Johansson
MF	(Sweden) Michael Andersson
MF	(Sweden) Tommy Holmgren	(substituted off) 57'
FW	(Sweden) Johnny Ekström
FW	(Sweden) Torbjörn Nilsson
Substitutes:
MF	(Norway) Per Edmund Mordt	(substituted in) 57'
MF	(Sweden) Jerry Carlsson
Manager:
(Sweden) Gunder Bengtsson
