= Robert Prytz =

Swedish former footballer (born 1960)

Personal information
- Full name: Robert Klas-Göran Prytz
- Date of birth: 12 January 1960 (age 66)
- Place of birth: Malmö, Sweden
- Height: 1.70 m (5 ft 7 in)
- Position: Midfielder

Youth career
- –1976: Kirseberg IF

Senior career*
Years	Team	Apps	(Gls)
1977–1982	Malmö FF	80	(27)
1982–1985	Rangers	77	(12)
1985–1986	IFK Göteborg	11	(2)
1986–1987	Young Boys	40	(15)
1987–1988	Uerdingen 05	32	(9)
1988–1989	Atalanta	30	(2)
1989–1993	Hellas Verona	122	(20)
1993–1995	Malmö FF	52	(9)
1995–1996	Young Boys	38	(3)
1996–1997	Kilmarnock	3	(0)
1997–1998	Dumbarton	3	(0)
1997–1998	Cowdenbeath	1	(0)
1997–1998	East Fife	18	(3)
1998–2000	Pollok	60	(17)
2000–2001	Hamilton Academical	9	(2)
Total		576	(121)

International career
1976	Sweden U17	3	(0)
1977–1978	Sweden U19	16	(0)
1980–1984	Sweden U21	8	(0)
1980–1989	Sweden	56	(13)
- * Club domestic league appearances and goals

Robert Klas-Göran Prytz (born 12 January 1960) is a Swedish former professional footballer who played as a midfielder from the late 1970s until the early 2000s. He earned 56 caps for the Sweden national team and is best known for his time at Hellas Verona, Malmö FF and Rangers.

He was the 1986 recipient of Guldbollen as Sweden's best footballer of the year.

== Career ==
Robert Klas-Göran Prytz was born 1960 in Malmö and grew up with four brothers and three sisters in a working-class neighbourhood called Kirseberg.

He started playing for his local team Kirsebergs IF before moving up to Malmö FF as a 16-year old. Under the successful English manager Bob Houghton Prytz flourished and although it was because of injuries he got the chance of a lifetime when he in 1979 as a 19 year old played in the European Cup Final vs Nottingham Forest in Munich. A game that Nottingham won 1–0. The year after he made his international debut for Sweden.

In 1982 Robert spent 3 months at Stoke City and was meant to sign for them, but work permit rules meant that the move didn't happen. Back home he got a call from an agent saying that there was another team in the UK interested in him: Glasgow Rangers. Robert Prytz was only the second Swedish player for Rangers after Örjan Persson that played in the club 1967-70.

In his first season in Scotland: 1982-83 Robert Prytz scored his first goal for the club vs Clydebank away in the League Cup in August, with Rangers winning 4-1.

He also made a good impact in his league debut away vs Motherwell scoring in a 2-2 draw. Prytz scored the 2-1 winner away to Aberdeen 3 weeks later and he scored a spectacular goal away to Celtic in October, a corner kick that went straight in goal.

His first season at Rangers saw him play 48 games (30 in the league) scoring 7 times (5 in the league) Rangers finishing only 4th in the league witch saw Dundee United winning. Rangers did reach both the Scottish Cup and League Cup finals but lost them both.

The 1983-84 season started the same way as the previous with Prytz scoring on the opening day of the season, a penalty earning a 1-1 draw at home against St Mirren. But after a terrible start to the season with Rangers losing 7 of the following 10 games manager John Greig was replaced by legendary manager Jock Wallace. Rangers did lose the following game but then went on a 22 match unbeaten run, but Rangers eventually finished 4th yet again. Aberdeen led by a former Rangers player called Alex Ferguson winning the league. Rangers did however win 2 trophies that season beating Celtic both in the Glasgow Cup final 1-0 as well as winning a thrilling League Cup final 3-2 after extra time, with Ally McCoist scoring a hattrick.

Robert Prytz's appearances for the season was 42 games (26 in the league) scoring 9 goals (4 in the league).

The season 1984-85 finished almost identically as the previous season with Aberdeen winning the league and Rangers finishing 4th. Rangers won both the League Cup and Glasgow Cup the second season in a row.

Prytz made 28 appearances (21 in the league) scoring 4 goals (3 in the league). His Rangers career saw him play 118 games (72 in the league) scoring 20 goals (12 in the league) in 3 seasons.

He joined IFK Gothenburg for a brief spell in the summer and then moved on to Young Boys in Switzerland where he became an instant success, winning the league that year.

Robert Prytz also represented Bayer Uerdingen, Atalanta, Hellas Verona, Malmö FF and Young Boys again before 1996 moving back "home" to Scotland He did keep his house in Glasgow the whole time since he met and married the Scottish Joyce, and had 2 daughters.

Prytz continued playing for various Scottish clubs for another 5 seasons, including Kilmarnock, Dumbarton, Cowdenbeath, East Fife, Pollok and Hamilton Accies before hanging up his boots in 2001.

During his career Robert Prytz won 2 league titles with Young Boys and Malmö FF. He also won the Swedish Cup with Malmö FF, the Swiss Cup with Young Boys and of course 2 League Cups and 2 Glasgow Cups with Rangers FC.

He also won the Guldbollen, the player of the year award in Sweden in 1986.

He was capped 56 times for Sweden, scoring 13 goals.

After retiring from professional football, he continued to play in friendlies for a team consisting of celebrities and former players.

== Career statistics ==
=== International ===
Appearances and goals by national team and year
National team	Year	Apps	Goals
Sweden	1980	1	0
Sweden	1981	3	0
Sweden	1982	4	0
Sweden	1983	7	3
Sweden	1984	5	3
Sweden	1985	8	5
Sweden	1986	7	2
Sweden	1987	9	0
Sweden	1988	8	0
Sweden	1989	4	0
Total		56	13

Scores and results list Sweden's goal tally first, score column indicates score after each Prytz goal.

List of international goals scored by Robert Prytz
No.	Date	Venue	Opponent	Score	Result	Competition	Ref.
1	27 April 1983	Stadion Galgenwaard, Utrecht, Netherlands	Netherlands	2–0	3–0	Friendly	
2	15 May 1983	Malmö Stadium, Malmö, Sweden	Cyprus	1–0	5–0	UEFA Euro 1984 qualification	
3	15 May 1983	Malmö Stadium, Malmö, Sweden	Cyprus	5–0	5–0	UEFA Euro 1984 qualification	
4	22 August 1984	Malmö Stadium, Malmö, Sweden	Mexico	1–0	1–1	Friendly	
5	14 November 1984	Estádio José Alvalade, Lisbon, Portugal	Portugal	1–1	3–1	1986 FIFA World Cup qualification	
6	14 November 1984	Estádio José Alvalade, Lisbon, Portugal	Portugal	2–1	3–1	1986 FIFA World Cup qualification	
7	1 May 1985	Ramat Gan Stadium, Ramat Gan, Israel	Israel	1–0	1–1	Friendly	
8	22 May 1985	Ullevi, Gothenburg, Sweden	Norway	1–0	1–0	1981–85 Nordic Football Championship	
9	5 June 1985	Råsunda Stadium, Solna, Sweden	Czechoslovakia	1–0	2–0	1986 FIFA World Cup qualification	
10	11 September 1985	Parken, Copenhagen, Denmark	Denmark	1–0	3–0	Friendly	
11	17 November 1985	Ta' Qali Stadium, Ta' Qali, Malta	Malta	1–0	2–1	1986 FIFA World Cup qualification	
12	6 August 1986	Helsinki Olympic Stadium, Helsinki, Finland	Finland	1–0	3–1	1981–85 Nordic Football Championship	
13	6 August 1986	Helsinki Olympic Stadium, Helsinki, Finland	Finland	3–0	3–1	1981–85 Nordic Football Championship	

== Honours ==
Malmö

- Allsvenskan: 1977
- Svenska Cupen: 1979–80
- European Cup Runner-up: 1978–79

Rangers

- Scottish League Cup: 1983–84, 1984–85

Young Boys

- Swiss League: 1985–86
- Swiss Cup: 1986–87
- Swiss Super Cup: 1986

Pollok

- Central Sectional League Cup: 1999–00
- West of Scotland Junior Cup: 1999–00

Hamilton Academical

- Scottish Third Division: 2000-01

Individual

- Stor Grabb: 1984
- Guldbollen: 1986
- Swiss Foreign Footballer of the Year: 1986–87
