= Malmö FF in European football =

Swedish club in European football

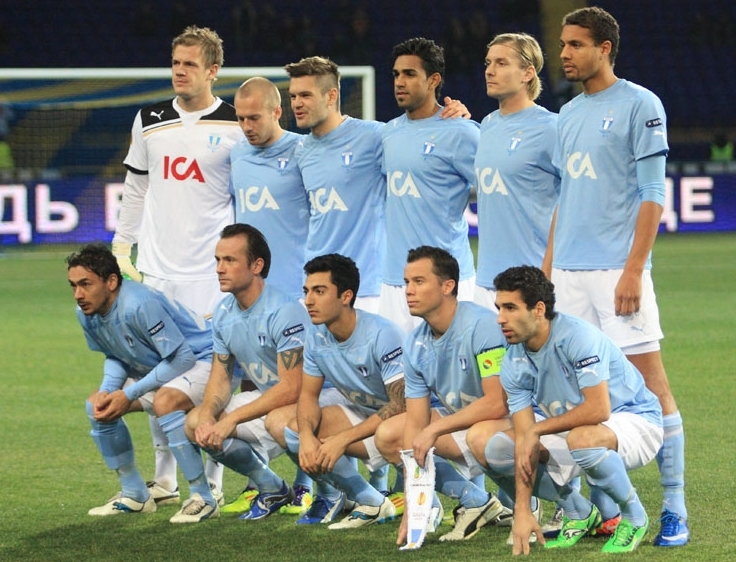
The Malmö FF team lines up before a 2011–12 UEFA Europa League group stage match against FC Metalist Kharkiv

Malmö Fotbollförening, also known simply as Malmö FF, is a Swedish professional football club based in Malmö. The club have participated in 41 editions of the club competitions governed by UEFA, the chief authority for football across Europe. These include 19 seasons in the European Cup and Champions League, 18 seasons in the UEFA Cup and Europa League, five seasons in the Cup Winners' Cup and one season in the Intertoto Cup. Malmö have also taken part in one club competition organised by the global federation FIFA, the Intercontinental Cup, in 1979. Counting all of the 149 games the side have played in UEFA competitions since their first entry into the European Cup in the 1964–65 season, the team's record stands at 55 wins, 32 draws and 62 defeats. (Note: This does not include the two matches played by Malmö FF in FIFA competitions and the eight matches played in the Inter-Cities Fairs Cup.) The club's most recent participation in a continental competition was in the 2025–26 season, when they played in the league phase of the UEFA Europa League.

The club play their home matches at the Stadion in Malmö; for UEFA matches, the capacity is 21,000 all-seated while for Swedish league matches 3,000 of these seats are removed to create standing room for 6,000 spectators. Malmö's 11–0 victory over Pezoporikos Larnaca of Cyprus in the 1973–74 European Cup Winners' Cup is the club's most decisive win in European competitions, while the team's heaviest defeat is 8–0 (the largest defeat ever recorded in the Champions League group stage), against Spanish club Real Madrid in the 2015–16 UEFA Champions League. With 53 caps, Jan Möller has appeared in the most UEFA matches for Malmö, while Markus Rosenberg have scored the most goals with 23. Malmö FF's most successful European campaign culminated in the club's contesting of the 1979 European Cup final against Nottingham Forest at the Olympic Stadium in Munich; Malmö lost 1–0. As of the 2018–19 season, the club is ranked 66th in the UEFA club coefficient.

== Key ==
- S = Seasons
- Pld = Matches played
- W = Matches won
- D = Matches drawn
- L = Matches lost
- GF = Goals for
- GA = Goals against
- GD = Goal difference
- H = Home ground
- A = Away ground
- N = Neutral ground
- Final = Final
- SF = Semi-finals
- QF = Quarter-finals
- R32 = Round of 32
- Group = Group stage
- PO = Play-off round
- R3 = Round 3
- R2 = Round 2
- R1 = Round 1
- QR3 = Third qualification round
- QR2 = Second qualification round
- QR1 = First qualification round
- QR = Qualification round
- a.e.t. = Match determined after extra time
- a = Match determined by away goals rule
- p = Match determined by penalty shoot-out
- Agg. = Aggregated score
- Ref. = Reference

Malmö's score is noted first in all of the match results given below.

== Overall record ==
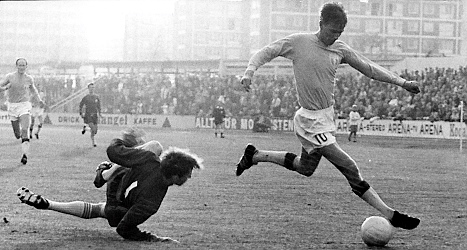
Dag Szepanski (with ball) playing for Malmö FF in 1968

Updated as of 29 January 2026

=== By competition ===
Competition	Seasons	Played	Won	Drew	Lost	GF	GA	GD	Win%
European Champion Clubs' Cup / UEFA Champions League	21	107	39	25	43	134	171	−37	36.45
UEFA Cup / UEFA Europa League	21	108	40	19	49	152	150	+2	37.04
Cup Winners' Cup	5	22	9	7	6	35	18	+17	40.91
Inter-Cities Fairs Cup	4	8	0	1	7	4	24	−20	0.00
UEFA Intertoto Cup	1	2	0	0	2	1	4	−3	0.00
Intercontinental Cup / FIFA Club World Cup	1	2	0	0	2	1	3	−2	0.00
Total	53	249	88	52	109	327	370	−43	35.34

GF = Goals for, GA = Goals against, GD = Goal difference

Source: UEFA.com

== List of opponents ==
=== By opponent club nationality ===
Country	Played	Wins	Draws	Losses	GF	GA	GD	Win%
Albania	4	2	2	0	4	0	+4	50.00
Austria	8	3	1	4	9	8	+1	37.50
Armenia	2	2	0	0	7	0	+7	100.00
Azerbaijan	1	1	0	0	2	1	+1	100.00
Belgium	9	0	3	6	7	17	−10	0.00
Bosnia and Herzegovina	2	1	0	1	3	1	+2	50.00
Bulgaria	5	2	0	3	9	12	−3	40.00
Croatia	7	2	1	4	12	12	+0	28.57
Cyprus	4	2	1	1	18	2	+16	50.00
Czech Republic	10	3	1	6	13	18	−5	30.00
Denmark	6	2	3	1	6	8	−2	33.33
England	11	1	1	9	4	20	−16	9.09
Faroe Islands	4	2	1	1	9	5	+4	50.00
Finland	6	4	2	0	11	5	+6	66.67
France	6	2	1	3	4	11	−7	33.33
Georgia	2	2	0	0	6	2	+4	100.00
Germany (Note: Incorporates Malmö FF's record against both East and West German clubs pre-1990)	18	3	4	11	13	32	−19	16.67
Greece	5	2	1	2	10	10	+0	40.00
Hungary	10	3	3	4	10	16	−6	30.00
Iceland	2	1	1	0	6	5	+1	50.00
Ireland	6	3	1	2	7	4	+3	50.00
Israel	4	3	1	0	9	4	+5	75.00
Italy	12	2	3	7	8	19	−11	16.67
Kosovo	2	2	0	0	5	0	+5	100.00
Latvia	8	5	3	0	12	3	+9	62.50
Lithuania	4	1	1	2	1	3	−2	25.00
Luxembourg	2	1	1	0	5	2	+3	50.00
Netherlands	7	1	2	4	6	15	−9	14.29
North Macedonia	2	0	1	1	2	4	−2	0.00
Northern Ireland	4	4	0	0	17	0	+17	100.00
Norway	2	0	2	0	2	2	+0	0.00
Paraguay	2	0	0	2	1	3	−2	0.00
Poland	5	4	0	1	12	4	+8	80.00
Portugal	9	2	0	7	5	15	−10	22.22
Romania	2	1	1	0	2	1	+1	50.00
Russia (Note: Incorporates Malmö FF's record against Soviet Russian clubs pre-1991)	4	1	1	2	4	7	−3	25.00
Scotland	11	6	1	4	21	17	+4	54.55
Serbia	1	0	0	1	0	1	−1	0.00
Slovenia	2	1	1	0	5	4	+1	50.00
Spain	7	0	0	7	2	25	−23	0.00
Switzerland	10	2	3	5	4	9	−5	20.00
Turkey	10	6	2	2	18	13	+5	60.00
Ukraine (Note: Incorporates Malmö FF's record against Soviet Ukrainian clubs pre-1991)	8	3	1	4	9	15	−6	37.50

GF = Goals for, GA = Goals against, GD = Goal difference

=== By club ===
The following list details Malmö FF's all-time record against clubs they have met three or more times in European competition, that is on more than one occasion. The club and its country are given, as well as the number of games played (Pld), won by Malmö (W), drawn (D) and lost by Malmö (L), goals for Malmö (GF), goals against Malmö (GA) and Malmö's goal difference (GD). Statistics are correct as of the 2025–26 season and include goals scored during extra time where applicable; in these games, the result given is the result at the end of extra time.

Club	Country	Played	Wins	Draws	Losses	GF	GA	GD	Win%	Ref.
Beşiktaş	Turkey	7	4	1	2	11	10	+1	57.14	
Rangers	Scotland	5	3	1	1	6	5	+1	60.00	
Wisła Kraków	Poland	4	3	0	1	10	4	+6	75.00	
Dynamo Kyiv	Ukraine	4	2	1	1	6	4	+2	50.00	
Red Bull Salzburg	Austria	4	2	0	2	7	4	+3	50.00	
Hibernian	Scotland	4	2	0	2	11	9	+2	50.00	
Benfica	Portugal	4	2	0	2	3	6	−3	50.00	
MOL Vidi (Note: This include the club's record against Videoton FC.)	Hungary	4	1	2	1	4	4	+0	25.00	
Internazionale	Italy	4	1	2	1	3	3	+0	25.00	
Dynamo Dresden	Germany	4	1	2	1	5	6	−1	25.00	
Copenhagen	Denmark	4	1	2	1	2	6	−4	25.00	
Austria Wien	Austria	4	1	1	2	2	4	−2	25.00	
Žalgiris Vilnius	Lithuania	4	1	1	2	1	3	−2	25.00	
Sparta Prague	Czech Republic	4	1	0	3	4	8	−4	25.00	
Hajduk Split	Croatia	4	0	1	3	4	8	−4	0.00	
Chelsea	England	4	0	0	4	1	10	−9	0.00	
Atlético Madrid	Spain	4	0	0	4	1	12	−11	0.00	
Juventus	Italy	4	0	0	4	0	8	−8	0.00	
Ludogorets Razgrad	Bulgaria	3	1	0	2	4	4	+0	33.33	
Olympiacos	Greece	3	1	0	2	4	5	−1	33.33	
Nottingham Forest	England	3	1	0	2	2	3	−1	33.33	
Slavia Prague	Czech Republic	3	0	1	2	4	7	−3	0.00	
Ferencváros	Hungary	3	0	1	2	3	8	−5	0.00	

GF = Goals for, GA = Goals against, GD = Goal difference

== Matches ==
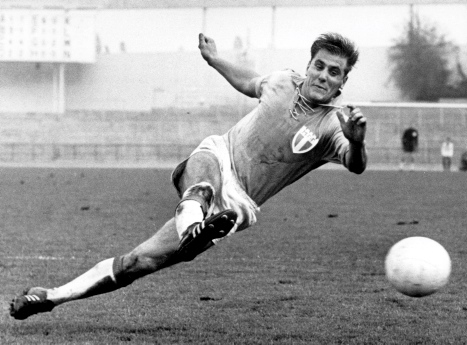
Malmö FF player Rolf Eriksson, pictured in 1964, when the club first entered the European Cup

=== European Champion Clubs' Cup / UEFA Champions League ===
The European Champion Clubs' Cup was founded in 1955 and was renamed the UEFA Champions League in 1992. Malmö FF first entered the competition in 1964–65, qualifying by virtue of their position at the top of the Allsvenskan table midway through the 1964 season. As Allsvenskan is played between April and October of each year, out of step with most European leagues, modern practice sees each season's Allsvenskan champions qualify for the UEFA Champions League competition starting in August the following year. Malmö FF's most notable achievement in this competition, and in all European tournaments, is reaching the final at the end of the 1978–79 season. In the 2014–15 season the side passed the qualifying rounds for the first time since the competition was re–branded. The following is a complete list of matches played by Malmö FF in the European Cup and the UEFA Champions League; it includes the season of the tournament, the stage, the opponent club and its country, the date, the venue and the score. It is up to date as of the 2025–26 season.

Season	Stage	Opponent		Date	Venue	Score	Agg.	Ref.
Season	Stage	Team	Country	Date	Venue	Score	Agg.	Ref.
1964–65	QR	Lokomotiv Sofia	Bulgaria	10 September 1964	Vasil Levski National Stadium, Sofia	3–8	5–8	
1964–65	QR	Lokomotiv Sofia	Bulgaria	30 September 1964	Malmö Stadion, Malmö	2–0	5–8	
1966–67	R1	Atlético Madrid	Spain	28 September 1966	Malmö Stadion, Malmö	0–2	1–5	
1966–67	R1	Atlético Madrid	Spain	12 October 1966	Vicente Calderón Stadium, Madrid	1–3	1–5	
1968–69	R1	Milan	Italy	18 September 1968	Malmö Stadion, Malmö	2–1	3–5	
1968–69	R1	Milan	Italy	2 October 1968	Stadio Giuseppe Meazza, Milan	1–4	3–5	
1971–72	R1	Újpesti Dózsa	Hungary	15 September 1971	Szusza Ferenc Stadium, Budapest	0–4	1–4	
1971–72	R1	Újpesti Dózsa	Hungary	29 September 1971	Malmö Stadion, Malmö	1–0	1–4	
1972–73	R1	Benfica	Portugal	13 September 1972	Malmö Stadion, Malmö	1–0	2–4	
1972–73	R1	Benfica	Portugal	27 September 1972	Estádio da Luz, Lisbon	1–4	2–4	
1975–76	R1	Magdeburg	East Germany	17 September 1975	Malmö Stadion, Malmö	2–1	3–3 (2–1 p)	
1975–76	R1	Magdeburg	East Germany	1 October 1975	Ernst Grube Stadium, Magdeburg	1–2 (a.e.t.)	3–3 (2–1 p)	
1975–76	R2	Bayern Munich	West Germany	22 October 1975	Malmö IP, Malmö	1–0	1–2	
1975–76	R2	Bayern Munich	West Germany	5 November 1975	Olympiastadion, Munich	0–2	1–2	
1976–77	R1	Torino	Italy	15 September 1976	Stadio Olimpico, Turin	1–2	2–3	
1976–77	R1	Torino	Italy	29 September 1976	Malmö Stadion, Malmö	1–1	2–3	
1978–79	R1	AS Monaco	France	13 September 1978	Malmö Stadion, Malmö	0–0	1–0	
1978–79	R1	AS Monaco	France	27 September 1978	Stade Louis II, Monaco	1–0	1–0	
1978–79	R2	Dynamo Kyiv	Soviet Union	18 October 1978	Metalist Stadium, Kharkiv	0–0	2–0	
1978–79	R2	Dynamo Kyiv	Soviet Union	1 November 1978	Malmö Stadion, Malmö	2–0	2–0	
1978–79	QF	Wisła Kraków	Poland	7 March 1979	Stadion Miejski, Kraków	1–2	5–3	
1978–79	QF	Wisła Kraków	Poland	21 March 1979	Malmö Stadion, Malmö	4–1	5–3	
1978–79	SF	Austria Vienna	Austria	11 April 1979	Ernst-Happel-Stadion, Vienna	0–0	1–0	
1978–79	SF	Austria Vienna	Austria	25 April 1979	Malmö Stadion, Malmö	1–0	1–0	
1978–79	Final	Nottingham Forest	England	30 May 1979	Olympiastadion, Munich	0–1	N/A	
1987–88	R1	Anderlecht	Belgium	16 September 1987	Malmö Stadion, Malmö	0–1	1–2	
1987–88	R1	Anderlecht	Belgium	30 September 1987	Constant Vanden Stock Stadium, Brussels	1–1	1–2	
1989–90	R1	Internazionale	Italy	13 September 1989	Malmö Stadion, Malmö	1–0	2–1	
1989–90	R1	Internazionale	Italy	27 September 1989	Stadio Giuseppe Meazza, Milan	1–1	2–1	
1989–90	R2	KV Mechelen	Belgium	18 October 1989	Malmö Stadion, Malmö	0–0	1–4	
1989–90	R2	KV Mechelen	Belgium	1 November 1989	Achter de Kazerne, Mechelen	1–4	1–4	
1990–91	R1	Beşiktaş	Turkey	19 September 1990	Malmö Stadion, Malmö	3–2	5–4	
1990–91	R1	Beşiktaş	Turkey	3 October 1990	BJK İnönü Stadyumu, Istanbul	2–2	5–4	
1990–91	R2	Dynamo Dresden	East Germany	24 October 1990	Rudolf-Harbig-Stadion, Dresden	1–1	2–2 (4–5 p)	
1990–91	R2	Dynamo Dresden	East Germany	7 November 1990	Malmö Stadion, Malmö	1–1 (a.e.t.)	2–2 (4–5 p)	
2005–06	QR2	Maccabi Haifa	Israel	27 July 2005	Malmö Stadion, Malmö	3–2	5–4	
2005–06	QR2	Maccabi Haifa	Israel	3 August 2005	Bloomfield Stadium, Tel Aviv	2–2	5–4	
2005–06	QR3	Thun	Switzerland	11 August 2005	Malmö Stadion, Malmö	0–1	0–4	
2005–06	QR3	Thun	Switzerland	24 August 2005	Stade de Suisse, Bern	0–3	0–4	
2011–12	QR2	HB Tórshavn	Faroe Islands	13 July 2011	Swedbank Stadion, Malmö	2–0	3–1	
2011–12	QR2	HB Tórshavn	Faroe Islands	19 July 2011	Gundadalur, Tórshavn	1–1	3–1	
2011–12	QR3	Rangers	Scotland	26 July 2011	Ibrox Stadium, Glasgow	1–0	2–1	
2011–12	QR3	Rangers	Scotland	3 August 2011	Swedbank Stadion, Malmö	1–1	2–1	
2011–12	PO	Dinamo Zagreb	Croatia	17 August 2011	Stadion Maksimir, Zagreb	1–4	3–4	
2011–12	PO	Dinamo Zagreb	Croatia	23 August 2011	Swedbank Stadion, Malmö	2–0	3–4	
2014–15	QR2	Ventspils	Latvia	16 July 2014	Swedbank Stadion, Malmö	0–0	1–0	
2014–15	QR2	Ventspils	Latvia	23 July 2014	Ventspils Olimpiskais Stadions, Ventspils	1–0	1–0	
2014–15	QR3	Sparta Prague	Czech Republic	29 July 2014	Generali Arena, Prague	2–4	4–4 (a)	
2014–15	QR3	Sparta Prague	Czech Republic	6 August 2014	Swedbank Stadion, Malmö	2–0	4–4 (a)	
2014–15	PO	Red Bull Salzburg	Austria	19 August 2014	Red Bull Arena, Wals-Siezenheim	1–2	4–2	
2014–15	PO	Red Bull Salzburg	Austria	27 August 2014	Swedbank Stadion, Malmö	3–0	4–2	
2014–15	Group	Juventus	Italy	16 September 2014	Juventus Stadium, Turin	0–2	4th	
2014–15	Group	Olympiacos	Greece	1 October 2014	Swedbank Stadion, Malmö	2–0	4th	
2014–15	Group	Atlético Madrid	Spain	22 October 2014	Vicente Calderón Stadium, Madrid	0–5	4th	
2014–15	Group	Atlético Madrid	Spain	4 November 2014	Swedbank Stadion, Malmö	0–2	4th	
2014–15	Group	Juventus	Italy	26 November 2014	Swedbank Stadion, Malmö	0–2	4th	
2014–15	Group	Olympiacos	Greece	9 December 2014	Karaiskakis Stadium, Piraeus	2–4	4th	
2015–16	QR2	Žalgiris Vilnius	Lithuania	15 July 2015	Swedbank Stadion, Malmö	0–0	1–0	
2015–16	QR2	Žalgiris Vilnius	Lithuania	21 July 2015	LFF Stadium, Vilnius	1–0	1–0	
2015–16	QR3	Red Bull Salzburg	Austria	29 July 2015	Red Bull Arena, Wals-Siezenheim	0–2	3–2	
2015–16	QR3	Red Bull Salzburg	Austria	5 August 2015	Swedbank Stadion, Malmö	3–0	3–2	
2015–16	PO	Celtic	Scotland	19 August 2015	Celtic Park, Glasgow	2–3	4–3	
2015–16	PO	Celtic	Scotland	25 August 2015	Swedbank Stadion, Malmö	2–0	4–3	
2015–16	Group	Paris Saint-Germain	France	15 September 2015	Parc des Princes, Paris	0–2	4th	
2015–16	Group	Real Madrid	Spain	30 September 2015	Swedbank Stadion, Malmö	0–2	4th	
2015–16	Group	Shakhtar Donetsk	Ukraine	21 October 2015	Swedbank Stadion, Malmö	1–0	4th	
2015–16	Group	Shakhtar Donetsk	Ukraine	3 November 2015	Arena Lviv, Lviv	0–4	4th	
2015–16	Group	Paris Saint-Germain	France	25 November 2015	Swedbank Stadion, Malmö	0–5	4th	
2015–16	Group	Real Madrid	Spain	8 December 2015	Santiago Bernabéu Stadium, Madrid	0–8	4th	
2017–18	QR2	Vardar	Macedonia	12 July 2017	Swedbank Stadion, Malmö	1–1	2–4	
2017–18	QR2	Vardar	Macedonia	18 July 2017	Stadion Mladost, Strumica	1–3	2–4	
2018–19	QR1	Drita	Kosovo	10 July 2018	Olympic Stadium Adem Jashari, Mitrovica	3−0	5−0	
2018–19	QR1	Drita	Kosovo	17 July 2018	Stadion, Malmö	2−0	5−0	
2018–19	QR2	CFR Cluj	Romania	24 July 2018	Stadionul Dr. Constantin Rădulescu, Cluj-Napoca	1−0	2−1	
2018–19	QR2	CFR Cluj	Romania	1 August 2018	Stadion, Malmö	1−1	2−1	
2018–19	QR3	MOL Vidi	Hungary	7 August 2018	Stadion, Malmö	1–1	1–1 (a)	
2018–19	QR3	MOL Vidi	Hungary	14 August 2018	Pancho Aréna, Felcsút	0–0	1–1 (a)	
2021–22	QR1	Riga	Latvia	7 July 2021	Eleda Stadion, Malmö	1−0	2–1	
2021–22	QR1	Riga	Latvia	13 July 2021	Skonto Stadium, Riga	1−1	2–1	
2021–22	QR2	HJK	Finland	21 July 2021	Eleda Stadion, Malmö	2−1	4−3	
2021–22	QR2	HJK	Finland	27 July 2021	Bolt Arena, Helsinki	2−2	4−3	
2021–22	QR3	Rangers	Scotland	3 August 2021	Eleda Stadion, Malmö	2−1	4−2	
2021–22	QR3	Rangers	Scotland	10 August 2021	Ibrox Stadium, Glasgow	2−1	4−2	
2021–22	PO	Ludogorets Razgrad	Bulgaria	18 August 2021	Eleda Stadion, Malmö	2−0	3−2	
2021–22	PO	Ludogorets Razgrad	Bulgaria	24 August 2021	Huvepharma Arena, Razgrad	1−2	3−2	
2021–22	Group	Juventus	Italy	14 September 2021	Eleda Stadion, Malmö	0–3	4th	
2021–22	Group	Zenit Saint Petersburg	Russia	29 September 2021	Krestovsky Stadium, Saint Petersburg	0–4	4th	
2021–22	Group	Chelsea	England	20 October 2021	Stamford Bridge, London	0–4	4th	
2021–22	Group	Chelsea	England	2 November 2021	Eleda Stadion, Malmö	0–1	4th	
2021–22	Group	Zenit Saint Petersburg	Russia	23 November 2021	Eleda Stadion, Malmö	1−1	4th	
2021–22	Group	Juventus	Italy	8 December 2021	Juventus Stadium, Turin	0–1	4th	
2022–23	QR1	Víkingur Reykjavík	Iceland	5 July 2022	Eleda Stadion, Malmö	3−2	6–5	
2022–23	QR1	Víkingur Reykjavík	Iceland	12 July 2022	Víkingsvöllur, Reykjavík	3–3	6–5	
2022–23	QR2	Žalgiris Vilnius	Lithuania	19 July 2022	LFF Stadium, Vilnius	0–1	0–3	
2022–23	QR2	Žalgiris Vilnius	Lithuania	27 July 2022	Eleda Stadion, Malmö	0–2	0–3	
2024–25	QR2	KÍ	Faroe Islands	23 July 2024	Eleda Stadion, Malmö	4−1	6–4	
2024–25	QR2	KÍ	Faroe Islands	30 July 2024	Við Djúpumýrar, Klaksvík	2–3	6–4	
2024–25	QR3	PAOK	Greece	6 August 2024	Eleda Stadion, Malmö	2−2	6–5	
2024–25	QR3	PAOK	Greece	13 August 2024	Toumba Stadium, Thessaloniki	4−3 (a.e.t.)	6–5	
2024–25	PO	Sparta Prague	Czech Republic	21 August 2024	Eleda Stadion, Malmö	0–2	0−4	
2024–25	PO	Sparta Prague	Czech Republic	27 August 2024	epet ARENA, Prague	0–2	0−4	
2025–26	QR1	Iberia 1999	Georgia	8 July 2025	Mikheil Meskhi Stadium, Tbilisi	3−1	6–2	
2025–26	QR1	Iberia 1999	Georgia	15 July 2025	Eleda Stadion, Malmö	3−1	6–2	
2025–26	QR2	RFS	Latvia	22 July 2025	LNK Sporta Parks, Riga	4−1	5–1	
2025–26	QR2	RFS	Latvia	30 July 2025	Eleda Stadion, Malmö	1−0	5–1	
2025–26	QR3	Copenhagen	Denmark	5 August 2025	Eleda Stadion, Malmö	0−0	0−5	
2025–26	QR3	Copenhagen	Denmark	12 August 2025	Parken Stadium, Copenhagen	0–5	0−5	

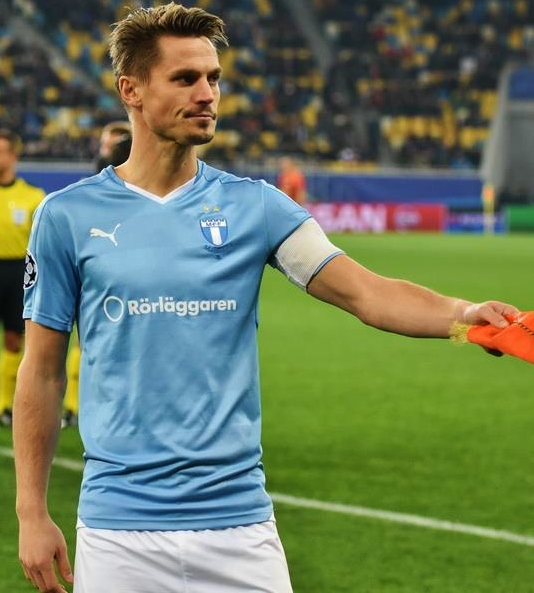
Markus Rosenberg before a Champions League match against Shakhtar Donetsk in 2015. His tally of 23 goals in European competitions is the highest by any Malmö player.

=== UEFA Cup / UEFA Europa League ===
The UEFA Cup, founded in 1971, was renamed the UEFA Europa League in 2009. Malmö FF first contested this competition in the 1977–78 season having qualified as Allsvenskan runners-up in 1976. The club competed in the competition for the first time since its rebranding to the UEFA Europa League during the 2011–12 season. The following is a complete list of matches played by Malmö FF in the UEFA Cup and UEFA Europa League. It includes the tournament season, the stage, the opponent club and its country, the date, the venue and the score. Statistics are correct as of the 2025–26 season.

Season	Stage	Opponent		Date	Venue	Score	Agg.	Ref.
Season	Stage	Team	Country	Date	Venue	Score	Agg.	Ref.
1977–78	R1	Lens	France	14 September 1977	Stade Félix-Bollaert, Lens	1–4	3–4	
1977–78	R1	Lens	France	28 September 1977	Malmö IP, Malmö	2–0	3–4	
1979–80	R1	KPT Kuopio	Finland	19 September 1979	Väinölänniemen stadion, Kuopio	2–1	4–1	
1979–80	R1	KPT Kuopio	Finland	3 October 1979	Malmö IP, Malmö	2–0	4–1	
1979–80	R2	Feyenoord	Netherlands	24 October 1979	Feijenoord Stadion, Rotterdam	0–4	1–5	
1979–80	R2	Feyenoord	Netherlands	7 November 1979	Malmö IP, Malmö	1–1	1–5	
1981–82	R1	Wisła Kraków	Poland	16 September 1981	Malmö IP, Malmö	2–0	5–1	
1981–82	R1	Wisła Kraków	Poland	30 September 1981	Stadion Miejski, Kraków	3–1	5–1	
1981–82	R2	Neuchâtel Xamax	Switzerland	21 October 1981	Malmö IP, Malmö	0–1	0–2	
1981–82	R2	Neuchâtel Xamax	Switzerland	3 November 1981	Stade de la Maladière, Neuchâtel	0–1	0–2	
1983–84	R1	Werder Bremen	West Germany	14 September 1983	Weserstadion, Bremen	1–1	2–3	
1983–84	R1	Werder Bremen	West Germany	28 September 1983	Malmö Stadion, Malmö	1–2	2–3	
1985–86	R1	Videoton	Hungary	18 September 1985	Sóstói Stadion, Székesfehérvár	0–1	3–3 (a)	
1985–86	R1	Videoton	Hungary	2 October 1985	Malmö IP, Malmö	3–2	3–3 (a)	
1988–89	R1	Torpedo Moscow	Soviet Union	7 September 1988	Malmö Stadion, Malmö	2–0	3–2	
1988–89	R1	Torpedo Moscow	Soviet Union	5 October 1988	Torpedo Stadium, Moscow	1–2 (a.e.t.)	3–2	
1988–89	R2	Internazionale	Italy	26 October 1988	Malmö Stadion, Malmö	0–1	1–2	
1988–89	R2	Internazionale	Italy	9 November 1988	Stadio Giuseppe Meazza, Milan	1–1	1–2	
1995–96	QR	Dundalk	Ireland	9 August 1995	United Park, Drogheda	2–0	4–0	
1995–96	QR	Dundalk	Ireland	23 August 1995	Malmö IP, Malmö	2–0	4–0	
1995–96	R1	Nottingham Forest	England	12 September 1995	Malmö Stadion, Malmö	2–1	2–2 (a)	
1995–96	R1	Nottingham Forest	England	26 September 1995	City Ground, Nottingham	0–1	2–2 (a)	
1996–97	QR	Skonto	Latvia	6 August 1996	Daugava Stadium, Riga	3–0	4–1	
1996–97	QR	Skonto	Latvia	20 August 1996	Malmö Stadion, Malmö	1–1	4–1	
1996–97	R1	Slavia Prague	Czech Republic	10 September 1996	Malmö Stadion, Malmö	1–2	2–5	
1996–97	R1	Slavia Prague	Czech Republic	24 September 1996	Stadion Eden, Prague	1–3	2–5	
1997–98	QR2	Hajduk Split	Croatia	12 August 1997	Stadion Poljud, Split	2–3	2–5	
1997–98	QR2	Hajduk Split	Croatia	26 August 1997	Malmö Stadion, Malmö	0–2	2–5	
1998–99	QR1	Shirak	Armenia	22 July 1998	Gyumri City Stadium, Gyumri	2–0	7–0	
1998–99	QR1	Shirak	Armenia	29 July 1998	Malmö IP, Malmö	5–0	7–0	
1998–99	QR2	Hajduk Split	Croatia	11 August 1998	Stadion Poljud, Split	1–1	2–3	
1998–99	QR2	Hajduk Split	Croatia	25 August 1998	Malmö IP, Malmö	1–2	2–3	
2003–04	QR	Portadown	Northern Ireland	14 August 2003	Malmö Stadion, Malmö	4–0	6–0	
2003–04	QR	Portadown	Northern Ireland	28 August 2003	Shamrock Park, Portadown	2–0	6–0	
2003–04	R1	Sporting CP	Portugal	24 September 2003	Estádio José Alvalade, Lisbon	0–2	0–3	
2003–04	R1	Sporting CP	Portugal	15 October 2003	Malmö Stadion, Malmö	0–1	0–3	
2005–06	R1	Beşiktaş	Turkey	15 September 2005	BJK İnönü Stadyumu, Istanbul	1–0	2–4	
2005–06	R1	Beşiktaş	Turkey	29 September 2005	Malmö Stadion, Malmö	1–4	2–4	
2011–12	Group	AZ	Netherlands	15 September 2011	AFAS Stadion, Alkmaar	1–4	4th	
2011–12	Group	Austria Wien	Austria	29 September 2011	Swedbank Stadion, Malmö	1–2	4th	
2011–12	Group	Metalist Kharkiv	Ukraine	20 October 2011	Swedbank Stadion, Malmö	1–4	4th	
2011–12	Group	Metalist Kharkiv	Ukraine	3 November 2011	Metalist Stadium, Kharkiv	1–3	4th	
2011–12	Group	AZ	Netherlands	30 November 2011	Swedbank Stadion, Malmö	0–0	4th	
2011–12	Group	Austria Wien	Austria	15 December 2011	Franz Horr Stadium, Vienna	0–2	4th	
2013–14	QR1	Drogheda United	Ireland	4 July 2013	Tallaght Stadium, Dublin	0–0	2–0	
2013–14	QR1	Drogheda United	Ireland	11 July 2013	Swedbank Stadion, Malmö	2–0	2–0	
2013–14	QR2	Hibernian	Scotland	18 July 2013	Swedbank Stadion, Malmö	2–0	9–0	
2013–14	QR2	Hibernian	Scotland	25 July 2013	Easter Road, Edinburgh	7–0	9–0	
2013–14	QR3	Swansea City	England (Note: Swansea City is a club based in Swansea, Wales, but represents England in European competition as they compete in the English league system.)	1 August 2013	Liberty Stadium, Swansea	0–4	0–4	
2013–14	QR3	Swansea City	England	8 August 2013	Swedbank Stadion, Malmö	0–0	0–4	
2018–19	PO	Midtjylland	Denmark	23 August 2018	Stadion, Malmö	2–2	4–2	
2018–19	PO	Midtjylland	Denmark	30 August 2018	MCH Arena, Herning	2–0	4–2	
2018–19	Group	Genk	Belgium	20 September 2018	Luminus Arena, Genk	0–2	2nd	
2018–19	Group	Beşiktaş	Turkey	4 October 2018	Stadion, Malmö	2–0	2nd	
2018–19	Group	Sarpsborg 08	Norway	25 October 2018	Sarpsborg Stadion, Sarpsborg	1–1	2nd	
2018–19	Group	Sarpsborg 08	Norway	8 November 2018	Stadion, Malmö	1–1	2nd	
2018–19	Group	Genk	Belgium	29 November 2018	Stadion, Malmö	2–2	2nd	
2018–19	Group	Beşiktaş	Turkey	13 December 2018	Vodafone Park, Istanbul	1–0	2nd	
2018–19	R32	Chelsea	England	14 February 2019	Stadion, Malmö	1–2	1–5	
2018–19	R32	Chelsea	England	21 February 2019	Stamford Bridge, London	0–3	1–5	
2019–20	QR1	Ballymena United	Northern Ireland	11 July 2019	Stadion, Malmö	7−0	11−0	
2019–20	QR1	Ballymena United	Northern Ireland	18 July 2019	Ballymena Showgrounds, Ballymena	4−0	11−0	
2019–20	QR2	Domžale	Slovenia	25 July 2019	Domžale Sports Park, Domžale	2−2	5−4	
2019–20	QR2	Domžale	Slovenia	1 August 2019	Stadion, Malmö	3−2	5−4	
2019–20	QR3	Zrinjski Mostar	Bosnia and Herzegovina	8 August 2019	Stadion, Malmö	3–0	3−1	
2019–20	QR3	Zrinjski Mostar	Bosnia and Herzegovina	15 August 2019	Stadion Pecara, Široki Brijeg	0–1	3−1	
2019–20	PO	Bnei Yehuda	Israel	22 August 2019	Stadion, Malmö	3–0	4–0	
2019–20	PO	Bnei Yehuda	Israel	29 August 2019	HaMoshava Stadium, Petah Tikva	1–0	4–0	
2019–20	Group	Dynamo Kyiv	Ukraine	19 September 2019	NSC Olimpiyskiy Stadium, Kyiv	0–1	1st	
2019–20	Group	Copenhagen	Denmark	3 October 2019	Stadion, Malmö	1–1	1st	
2019–20	Group	Lugano	Switzerland	24 October 2019	Stadion, Malmö	2–1	1st	
2019–20	Group	Lugano	Switzerland	7 November 2019	Kybunpark, St. Gallen	0–0	1st	
2019–20	Group	Dynamo Kyiv	Ukraine	28 November 2019	Stadion, Malmö	4–3	1st	
2019–20	Group	Copenhagen	Denmark	12 December 2019	Telia Parken, Copenhagen	1–0	1st	
2019–20	R32	VfL Wolfsburg	Germany	20 February 2020	Volkswagen Arena, Wolfsburg	1–2	1–5	
2019–20	R32	VfL Wolfsburg	Germany	27 February 2020	Eleda Stadion, Malmö	0–3	1–5	
2020–21	QR1	Cracovia	Poland	27 August 2020	Eleda Stadion, Malmö	2–0	N/A	
2020–21	QR2	Honvéd	Hungary	17 September 2020	Hidegkuti Nándor Stadion, Budapest	2–0	N/A	
2020–21	QR3	Lokomotiva	Croatia	24 September 2020	Eleda Stadion, Malmö	5–0	N/A	
2020–21	PO	Granada	Spain	1 October 2020	Eleda Stadion, Malmö	1–3	N/A	
2022–23	QR3	F91 Dudelange	Luxembourg	4 August 2022	Eleda Stadion, Malmö	3–0	5–2	
2022–23	QR3	F91 Dudelange	Luxembourg	11 August 2022	Stade de Luxembourg, Luxembourg	2–2	5–2	
2022–23	PO	Sivasspor	Turkey	18 August 2022	Eleda Stadion, Malmö	3–1	5–1	
2022–23	PO	Sivasspor	Turkey	25 August 2022	New Sivas 4 Eylül Stadium, Sivas	2–0	5–1	
2022–23	Group	Braga	Portugal	8 September 2022	Eleda Stadion, Malmö	0–2	4th	
2022–23	Group	Union Saint-Gilloise	Belgium	15 September 2022	Den Dreef, Leuven	2–3	4th	
2022–23	Group	Union Berlin	Germany	6 October 2022	Eleda Stadion, Malmö	0–1	4th	
2022–23	Group	Union Berlin	Germany	13 October 2022	Stadion An der Alten Försterei, Berlin	0–1	4th	
2022–23	Group	Union Saint-Gilloise	Belgium	27 October 2022	Eleda Stadion, Malmö	0–2	4th	
2022–23	Group	Braga	Portugal	3 November 2022	Estádio Municipal de Braga, Braga	1–2	4th	
2024–25	League	Rangers	Scotland	26 September 2024	Eleda Stadion, Malmö	0–2	31st	
2024–25	League	Qarabağ	Azerbaijan	3 October 2024	Tofiq Bahramov Republican Stadium, Baku	2–1	31st	
2024–25	League	Olympiacos	Greece	24 October 2024	Eleda Stadion, Malmö	0–1	31st	
2024–25	League	Beşiktaş	Turkey	6 November 2024	Tüpraş Stadyumu, Istanbul	1–2	31st	
2024–25	League	Ferencváros	Hungary	28 November 2024	Groupama Aréna, Budapest	1–4	31st	
2024–25	League	Galatasaray	Turkey	12 December 2024	Eleda Stadion, Malmö	2–2	31st	
2024–25	League	Twente	Netherlands	23 January 2025	Eleda Stadion, Malmö	2–3	31st	
2024–25	League	Slavia Prague	Czech Republic	30 January 2025	Fortuna Arena, Prague	2–2	31st	
2025–26	PO	Sigma Olomouc	Czech Republic	21 August 2025	Eleda Stadion, Malmö	3–0	5–0	
2025–26	PO	Sigma Olomouc	Czech Republic	28 August 2025	Andrův stadion, Olomouc	2–0	5–0	
2025–26	League	Ludogorets Razgrad	Bulgaria	24 September 2025	Eleda Stadion, Malmö	1–2	35th	
2025–26	League	Viktoria Plzeň	Czech Republic	2 October 2025	Doosan Arena, Plzeň	0–3	35th	
2025–26	League	Dinamo Zagreb	Croatia	23 October 2025	Eleda Stadion, Malmö	1–1	35th	
2025–26	League	Panathinaikos	Greece	6 November 2025	Eleda Stadion, Malmö	0–1	35th	
2025–26	League	Nottingham Forest	England	27 November 2025	City Ground, Nottingham	0–3	35th	
2025–26	League	Porto	Portugal	11 December 2025	Estádio do Dragão, Porto	1–2	35th	
2025–26	League	Red Star Belgrade	Serbia	22 January 2026	Eleda Stadion, Malmö	0–1	35th	
2025–26	League	Genk	Belgium	29 January 2026	Cegeka Arena, Genk	1–2	35th	

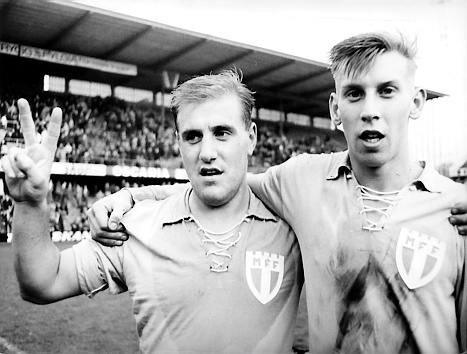
Bo Larsson (right) and Rolf Eriksson, pictured in 1964. Larsson would go on to make 546 appearances for Malmö during the 1960s and 1970s, scoring 289 goals.

=== European Cup Winners' Cup / UEFA Cup Winners' Cup ===
The European Cup Winners' Cup was formed in 1960, with the word "European" replaced by "UEFA" in 1994; it was abolished in 1999. Malmö FF first played in the Cup Winners' Cup in the 1973–74 season as the 1973 winners of the Svenska Cupen. The following is a complete list of matches played by Malmö FF in the Cup Winners' Cup. It includes the season of the tournament, the stage, the opponent club and its country, the date, the venue and the score.

Season	Stage	Opponent		Date	Venue	Score	Agg.	Ref.
Season	Stage	Team	Country	Date	Venue	Score	Agg.	Ref.
1973–74	R1	Pezoporikos Larnaca	Cyprus	19 September 1973	GSZ Stadium, Larnaca	0–0	11–0	
1973–74	R1	Pezoporikos Larnaca	Cyprus	22 September 1973	Malmö Stadion, Malmö	11–0	11–0	
1973–74	R2	FC Zürich	Switzerland	24 October 1973	Letzigrund, Zürich	0–0	1–1 (a)	
1973–74	R2	FC Zürich	Switzerland	7 November 1973	Malmö Stadion, Malmö	1–1	1–1 (a)	
1974–75	R1	FC Sion	Switzerland	18 September 1974	Malmö Stadion, Malmö	1–0	1–1 (5–4 p)	
1974–75	R1	FC Sion	Switzerland	2 October 1974	Stade Tourbillon, Sion	0–1 (a.e.t.)	1–1 (5–4 p)	
1974–75	R2	Lahden Reipas	Finland	23 October 1974	Malmö Stadion, Malmö	3–1	3–1	
1974–75	R2	Lahden Reipas	Finland	6 November 1974	Lahden kisapuisto, Lahti	0–0	3–1	
1974–75	QF	Ferencváros	Hungary	5 March 1975	Malmö Stadion, Malmö	1–3	2–4	
1974–75	QF	Ferencváros	Hungary	19 March 1975	Üllői úti stadion, Budapest	1–1	2–4	
1980–81	R1	Partizani Tirana	Albania	17 September 1980	Malmö Stadion, Malmö	1–0	1–0	
1980–81	R1	Partizani Tirana	Albania	1 October 1980	Qemal Stafa Stadium, Tirana	0–0	1–0	
1980–81	R2	Benfica	Portugal	22 October 1980	Malmö Stadion, Malmö	1–0	1–2	
1980–81	R2	Benfica	Portugal	5 November 1980	Estádio da Luz, Lisbon	0–2	1–2	
1984–85	R1	Dynamo Dresden	East Germany	19 September 1984	Malmö Stadion, Malmö	2–0	3–4	
1984–85	R1	Dynamo Dresden	East Germany	3 October 1984	Rudolf-Harbig-Stadion, Dresden	1–4	3–4	
1986–87	R1	Apollon Limassol	Cyprus	17 September 1986	Malmö Stadion, Malmö	6–0	7–2	
1986–87	R1	Apollon Limassol	Cyprus	1 October 1986	Tsirion Stadium, Limassol	1–2	7–2	
1986–87	R2	17 Nëntori Tirana	Albania	22 October 1986	Malmö Stadion, Malmö	3–0	3–0	
1986–87	R2	17 Nëntori Tirana	Albania	5 November 1986	Qemal Stafa Stadium, Tirana	0–0	3–0	
1986–87	QF	Ajax	Netherlands	4 March 1987	Malmö Stadion, Malmö	1–0	2–3	
1986–87	QF	Ajax	Netherlands	18 March 1987	Olympic Stadium, Amsterdam	1–3	2–3	

=== Inter-Cities Fairs Cup ===
The Inter-Cities Fairs Cup was founded in 1955 and ran each season until it was replaced by the UEFA Cup in 1971. Malmö FF first competed in the Fairs Cup for the 1965–66 season and played in the last edition of the competition in the 1970–71 season. The following is a complete list of matches played by Malmö FF in the Fairs Cup. It includes the season of the tournament, the stage, the opponent club and its country, the date, the venue and the score.

Season	Stage	Opponent		Date	Venue	Score	Agg.	Ref.
Season	Stage	Team	Country	Date	Venue	Score	Agg.	Ref.
1965–66	R1	TSV 1860 München	West Germany	15 September 1965	Malmö Stadion, Malmö	0–3	0–7	
1965–66	R1	TSV 1860 München	West Germany	28 September 1965	Grünwalder Stadion, Munich	0–4	0–7	
1967–68	R1	Liverpool	England	19 September 1967	Malmö Stadion, Malmö	0–2	1–4	
1967–68	R1	Liverpool	England	4 October 1967	Anfield, Liverpool	1–2	1–4	
1969–70	R1	Stuttgart	West Germany	17 September 1969	Neckarstadion, Stuttgart	0–3	1–4	
1969–70	R1	Stuttgart	West Germany	1 October 1969	Malmö Stadion, Malmö	1–1	1–4	
1970–71	R1	Hibernian	Scotland	16 September 1970	Easter Road, Edinburgh	0–6	2–9	
1970–71	R1	Hibernian	Scotland	30 September 1970	Malmö Stadion, Malmö	2–3	2–9	

=== UEFA Intertoto Cup ===
The UEFA Intertoto Cup was founded in 1995 as a replacement for the original Intertoto Cup, and ran each season until its abolishment in 2008. Malmö FF's only appearance was in 2004, having finished 3rd in Allsvenskan the previous year.

Season	Stage	Opponent		Date	Venue	Score	Agg.	Ref.
Season	Stage	Team	Country	Date	Venue	Score	Agg.	Ref.
2004	R1	Cork City	Ireland	20 June 2004	Turners Cross, Cork	1–3	1–4	
2004	R1	Cork City	Ireland	27 June 2004	Malmö Stadion, Malmö	0–1	1–4	

=== Intercontinental Cup / FIFA Club World Cup ===
The Intercontinental Cup was founded in 1960 and replaced by the FIFA Club World Cup in 2004. Malmö FF's only appearance in either to date was in 1979, when Nottingham Forest, who had defeated Malmö in the 1979 European Cup final, refused to take part. As the defeated finalists, Malmö FF took the English club's place in the two-legged tie against Olimpia of Paraguay.

Season	Opponent		Date	Venue	Score	Agg.	Ref.
Season	Team	Country	Date	Venue	Score	Agg.	Ref.
1979	Olimpia	Paraguay	18 November 1979	Malmö Stadion, Malmö	0–1	1–3	
1979	Olimpia	Paraguay	2 March 1980	Defensores del Chaco, Asunción	1–2	1–3	

== European Ranking ==
=== UEFA Ranking & Coefficient ===
The following data indicates Malmö FF coefficient rankings since 1999.

As of 19 June 2022

2023	2022	Mvmt.	Club	2018–19	2019–20	2020–21	2021–22	2022–23	2023 Coeff.
55	60	+5	(Russia) Krasnodar	11.00	6.00	8.00			25.000
57	78	+21	(Spain) Real Betis	10.00			11.00	3.00	24.000
57	68	+11	(Sweden) Malmö FF	7.00	8.00	2.50	5.00	1.50	24.000
59	74	+15	(England) West Ham				21.00	2.50	23.500
60	61	+1	(France) Monaco	5.00			15.00	3.00	23.000

=== ClubElo Ranking ===
As of 19 December 2021

Rank	Club	Elo
134	(Germany) Werder Bremen	1550
135	(Belgium) Gent	1548
136	(Sweden) Malmö FF	1545
137	(Croatia) Osijek	1545
138	(Spain) Leganés	1544
