= 1977–78 Maltese Premier League =

Football tournament edition

Maltese First Division
- Season: 1977–78
- Champions: Valletta F.C. (10th title)
- Relegated: Birkirkara F.C. Vittoriosa Stars F.C.
- European Cup: Valletta F.C.
- European Cup Winners' Cup: Floriana F.C.
- UEFA Cup: Hibernians F.C.
- Matches played: 90
- Goals scored: 248 (2.76 per match)

The 1977–78 Maltese First Division was the 63rd season of top-tier football in Malta. It was contested by 10 teams, and Valletta F.C. won the championship.

== League standings ==
| Pos | Team | Pld | W | D | L | GF | GA | GD | Pts | Qualification |
|---|---|---|---|---|---|---|---|---|---|---|
| 1 | Valletta F.C. (C) | 18 | 12 | 4 | 2 | 44 | 6 | +38 | 28 | Qualification for the European Cup |
| 2 | Hibernians F.C. | 18 | 11 | 4 | 3 | 39 | 14 | +25 | 26 | Qualification for the UEFA Cup |
| 3 | Sliema Wanderers F.C. | 18 | 8 | 8 | 2 | 28 | 14 | +14 | 24 | |
| 4 | Floriana F.C. | 18 | 9 | 6 | 3 | 34 | 13 | +21 | 23 (Note: 1 point deducted) | Qualification for the European Cup Winners' Cup (Note: Floriana qualified for the Cup Winners' Cup as Maltese FA Trophy Runners-up, as winners Valletta already qualified for the European Cup.) |
| 5 | Hamrun Spartans F.C. | 18 | 7 | 7 | 4 | 27 | 13 | +14 | 22 (Note: 1 bonus point awarded) | |
| 6 | Msida Saint-Joseph F.C. | 18 | 5 | 7 | 6 | 19 | 34 | −15 | 17 | |
| 7 | Marsa F.C. | 18 | 5 | 5 | 8 | 20 | 27 | −7 | 15 | |
| 8 | St. George's F.C. | 18 | 3 | 7 | 8 | 17 | 31 | −14 | 13 | |
| 9 | Birkirkara F.C. (R) | 18 | 3 | 2 | 13 | 11 | 38 | −27 | 8 | Relegation |
| 10 | Vittoriosa Stars F.C. (R) | 18 | 1 | 2 | 15 | 9 | 58 | −49 | 4 | Relegation |

Source: rsssf.com
(C) Champions; (R) Relegated

== Results ==
| Home \ Away | BKR | HIB | FRN | ĦMR | MRS | MSD | SLM | STG | VLT | VTS |
|---|---|---|---|---|---|---|---|---|---|---|
| Birkirkara | — | 1–3 | 2–1 | 1–3 | 0–3 | 0–1 | 1–4 | 1–0 | 0–2 | 1–0 |
| Hibernians | 4–0 | — | 1–0 | 1–0 | 3–0 | 2–2 | 1–3 | 3–0 | 0–0 | 5–0 |
| Floriana | 4–0 | 1–1 | — | 0–0 (Note: The match between Floriana and Ħamrun Spartans (originally finished 0–0) was rated as a win for Ħamrun with the same result.) | 2–0 | 3–1 | 0–0 | 2–1 | 1–0 | 4–2 |
| Ħamrun Spartans | 0–0 | 0–1 | 1–0 | — | 4–3 | 2–2 | 0–0 | 0–0 | 0–1 | 2–0 |
| Marsa | 3–2 | 1–2 | 1–1 | 1–0 | — | 1–1 | 1–3 | 2–1 | 0–3 | 1–1 |
| Msida Saint-Joseph | 1–0 | 1–3 | 2–2 | 0–2 | 1–0 | — | 0–2 | 1–1 | 0–11 | 3–1 |
| Sliema Wanderers | 1–1 | 2–1 | 0–4 | 1–1 | 0–0 | 0–1 | — | 1–1 | 0–0 | 1–0 |
| St. George's | 2–1 | 2–2 | 1–1 | 1–4 | 0–0 | 2–2 | 1–5 | — | 0–3 | 2–0 |
| Valletta | 4–0 | 1–0 | 0–1 | 1–1 | 2–1 | 2–0 | 1–1 | 2–0 | — | 6–1 |
| Vittoriosa Stars | 2–0 | 0–6 | 0–7 | 0–7 | 1–2 | 0–0 | 0–4 | 1–2 | 0–5 | — |

Legend: Blue = home team win; Yellow = draw; Red = away team win.
