= Johny Erlandsson =

Swedish association footballer

Personal information
- Full name: Johny Erlandsson
- Date of birth: 11 September 1955 (age 71)
- Place of birth: Sweden
- Position: Forward

Senior career*
Years	Team	Apps	(Gls)
1973–1988	Kalmar FF	304	(74)

International career
1977-1981	Sweden	4	(0)
- * Club domestic league appearances and goals

Johny Erlandsson (born 11 September 1955) is a Swedish former football player.

During his club career, Erlandsson played for Kalmar FF.

Erlandsson made 4 appearances for the Sweden men's national football team, coming between 1977 and 1981.
