= Tony Ström =

Swedish footballer

Personal information
- Full name: Tony Ström
- Position: Goalkeeper

Senior career*
| Years | Team | Apps | (Gls) |
| 1981 | Malmö FF | 26 | (0) |
- * Club domestic league appearances and goals

Tony Ström is a Swedish former footballer who played as a goalkeeper.
