= Tommy Andersson (footballer, born 1950) =

Swedish footballer

Personal information
- Full name: Tommy Andersson
- Date of birth: February 3, 1950 (age 76)
- Position: Forward

Youth career
- Lunds SK
- Malmö FF

Senior career*
| Years | Team | Apps | (Gls) |
| 1969–1980 | Malmö FF | 123 | (28) |
| 1981–1984 | Lunds BK | | |
- * Club domestic league appearances and goals

Tommy Andersson (born 3 February 1950) is a Swedish former footballer who played as a forward.

== Honours ==
Malmö FF

- Allsvenskan: 1970, 1971, 1974, 1975, 1977
