= 1978–79 European Cup =

European football tournament

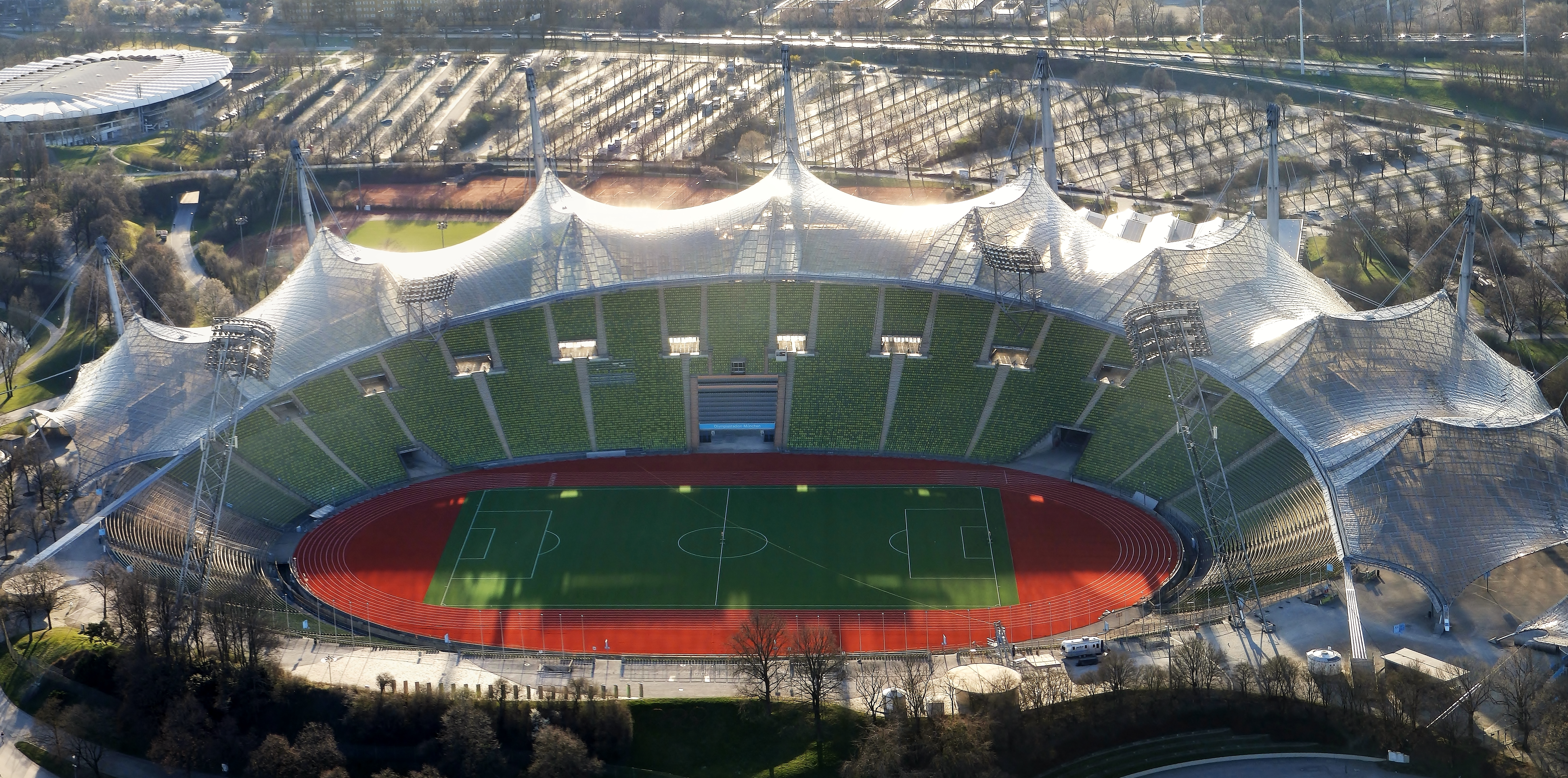
- The Olympiastadion in Munich hosted the final.

Tournament details
- Dates: 15 August 1978 – 30 May 1979
- Teams: 33

Final positions
- Champions: (England) Nottingham Forest (1st title)
- Runners-up: (Sweden) Malmö FF

Tournament statistics
- Matches played: 63
- Goals scored: 185 (2.94 per match)
- Attendance: 1,688,020 (26,794 per match)
- Top scorer(s): Claudio Sulser (Grasshoppers); 11 goals

The 1978–79 season of the European Cup football club tournament was won by English champions Nottingham Forest in the final against Swedish side Malmö FF. Forest, enjoying a great run of success under Brian Clough, had defeated defending two-time champions Liverpool in the first round.

== Teams ==
(Albania) Vllaznia (1st)	Austria Wien (1st)	(Belgium) Club Brugge (1st)
(Bulgaria) Lokomotiv Sofia (1st)	(Cyprus) Omonia (1st)	(Czechoslovakia) Zbrojovka Brno (1st)
(Denmark) Odense (1st)	(England) Nottingham Forest (1st)	(England) Liverpool (2nd)^{TH}
(Finland) Haka (1st)	(France) Monaco (1st)	(East Germany) Dynamo Dresden (1st)
(West Germany) Köln (1st)	(Greece) AEK Athens (1st)	(Hungary) Újpesti Dózsa (1st)
(Iceland) ÍA (1st)	(Republic of Ireland) Bohemians (1st)	(Italy) Juventus (1st)
(Luxembourg) Progrès Niedercorn (1st)	(Malta) Valletta (1st)	(Netherlands) PSV Eindhoven (1st)
(Northern Ireland) Linfield (1st)	(Norway) Lillestrøm (1st)	(Poland) Wisła Kraków (1st)
(Portugal) Porto (1st)	(Romania) Steaua București (1st)	(Scotland) Rangers (1st)
(Spain) Real Madrid (1st)	(Sweden) Malmö FF (1st)	(Switzerland) Grasshopper (1st)
(Turkey) Fenerbahçe (1st)	(Soviet Union) Dynamo Kyiv (1st)	(Socialist Federal Republic of Yugoslavia) Partizan (1st)

== Preliminary round ==
Team 1	Agg.	Team 2	1st leg	2nd leg
Monaco (France)	3–2	(Romania) Steaua București	3–0	0–2

=== First leg ===
15 August 1978

Monaco (France)	3–0	(Romania) Steaua București
Onnis 42'; Zorzetto 48'; Nogués 61'	Report

Stade Louis II, Monaco
Attendance: 6,434
Referee: Ángel Franco Martínez (Spain)

=== Second leg ===
30 August 1978

Steaua București (Romania)	2–0	(France) Monaco
Troi 51', 76'	Report

Stadionul Steaua, Bucharest
Attendance: 25,000
Referee: Ernst Dörflinger-Buser (Switzerland)

Monaco won 3–2 on aggregate.

== Bracket ==
First Round
(Albania) Vllaznia	2	1	3
Austria Wien	0	4	4
(Northern Ireland) Linfield	0	0	0
(Norway) Lillestrøm	0	1	1
(Cyprus) Omonia	2	0	2
(Republic of Ireland) Bohemians (a)	1	1	2
(Socialist Federal Republic of Yugoslavia) Partizan	2	0	2 (4)
(East Germany) Dynamo Dresden (p)	0	2	2 (5)
(Czechoslovakia) Zbrojovka Brno	2	2	4
(Hungary) Újpesti Dózsa	2	0	2
(Belgium) Club Brugge	2	1	3
(Poland) Wisła Kraków	1	3	4
(Finland) Haka	0	1	1
(Soviet Union) Dynamo Kyiv	1	3	4
(Sweden) Malmö FF	0	1	1
(France) Monaco	0	0	0
(Greece) AEK Athens	6	1	7
(Portugal) Porto	1	4	5
(England) Nottingham Forest	2	0	2
(England) Liverpool	0	0	0
(Spain) Real Madrid	5	7	12
(Luxembourg) Progrès Niedercorn	0	0	0
(Switzerland) Grasshopper	8	5	13
(Malta) Valletta	0	3	3
(Denmark) Odense	2	1	3
(Bulgaria) Lokomotiv Sofia	2	2	4
(West Germany) Köln	4	1	5
(Iceland) ÍA	1	1	2
(Italy) Juventus	1	0	1
(Scotland) Rangers	0	2	2
(Turkey) Fenerbahçe	2	1	3
(Netherlands) PSV Eindhoven	1	6	7

Second Round
Austria Wien	4	0	4
(Norway) Lillestrøm	1	0	1
(Republic of Ireland) Bohemians	0	0	0
(East Germany) Dynamo Dresden	0	6	6
(Czechoslovakia) Zbrojovka Brno	2	1	3
(Poland) Wisła Kraków (a)	2	1	3
(Soviet Union) Dynamo Kyiv	0	0	0
(Sweden) Malmö FF	0	2	2
(Greece) AEK Athens	1	1	2
(England) Nottingham Forest	2	5	7
(Spain) Real Madrid	3	0	3
(Switzerland) Grasshopper (a)	1	2	3
(Bulgaria) Lokomotiv Sofia	0	0	0
(West Germany) Köln	1	4	5
(Scotland) Rangers	0	3	3
(Netherlands) PSV Eindhoven	0	2	2

Quarter-finals
Austria Wien	3	0	3
(East Germany) Dynamo Dresden	1	1	2
(Poland) Wisła Kraków	2	1	3
(Sweden) Malmö FF	1	4	5
(England) Nottingham Forest	4	1	5
(Switzerland) Grasshopper	1	1	2
(West Germany) Köln	1	1	2
(Scotland) Rangers	0	1	1

Semi-finals
Austria Wien	0	0	0
(Sweden) Malmö FF	0	1	1
(England) Nottingham Forest	3	1	4
(West Germany) Köln	3	0	3

Final
(Sweden) Malmö FF	0
(England) Nottingham Forest	1

== First round ==
Team 1	Agg.	Team 2	1st leg	2nd leg
AEK Athens (Greece)	7–5	(Portugal) Porto	6–1	1–4
Nottingham Forest (England)	2–0	(England) Liverpool	2–0	0–0
Real Madrid (Spain)	12–0	(Luxembourg) Progrès Niedercorn	5–0	7–0
Grasshopper (Switzerland)	13–3	(Malta) Valletta	8–0	5–3
Odense (Denmark)	3–4	(Bulgaria) Lokomotiv Sofia	2–2	1–2
Köln (West Germany)	5–2	(Iceland) ÍA	4–1	1–1
Juventus (Italy)	1–2	(Scotland) Rangers	1–0	0–2
Fenerbahçe (Turkey)	3–7	(Netherlands) PSV Eindhoven	2–1	1–6
Vllaznia (Albania)	3–4	Austria Wien	2–0	1–4
Linfield (Northern Ireland)	0–1	(Norway) Lillestrøm	0–0	0–1
Omonia (Cyprus)	2–2 (a)	(Republic of Ireland) Bohemians	2–1	0–1
Partizan (Socialist Federal Republic of Yugoslavia)	2–2 (4–5 p)	(East Germany) Dynamo Dresden	2–0	0–2
Zbrojovka Brno (Czechoslovakia)	4–2	(Hungary) Újpesti Dózsa	2–2	2–0
Club Brugge (Belgium)	3–4	(Poland) Wisła Kraków	2–1	1–3
Haka (Finland)	1–4	(Soviet Union) Dynamo Kyiv	0–1	1–3
Malmö FF (Sweden)	1–0	(France) Monaco	0–0	1–0

=== First leg ===
13 September 1978
21:00

AEK Athens (Greece)	6–1	(Portugal) Porto
Bajević 3', 20'; Ardizoglou 16'; Konstantinou 39'; Nikolaou 58'; Mavros 60'	Report	Oliveira 51'

AEK Stadium, Athens
Attendance: 33,000
Referee: Eldar Azimzade (Soviet Union)

13 September 1978

Nottingham Forest (England)	2–0	(England) Liverpool
Birtles 26'; Barrett 87'	Report

City Ground, Nottingham
Attendance: 38,316
Referee: Erich Linemayr (Austria)

13 September 1978

Real Madrid (Spain)	5–0	(Luxembourg) Progrès Niedercorn
Jensen 12'; Juanito 30', 66'; Del Bosque 40'; Wolff 84'	Report

Santiago Bernabéu, Madrid
Attendance: 70,000
Referee: Mário Luís (Portugal)

13 September 1978

Grasshopper (Switzerland)	8–0	(Malta) Valletta
Sulser 31', 46', 58', 62', 64'; Ponte 32', 35'; Wehrli 67'	Report

Hardturm, Zurich
Attendance: 3,500
Referee: Marcel Herrmann (Luxembourg)

13 September 1978

Odense (Denmark)	2–2	(Bulgaria) Lokomotiv Sofia
Munk Nielsen 32', 44'	Report	Kolev 60'; Velichkov 69'

Atletikstadion, Odense
Attendance: 7,200
Referee: Eamonn Farrell (Republic of Ireland)

13 September 1978

Köln (West Germany)	4–1	(Iceland) ÍA
Littbarski 12'; Neumann 26', 39'; Konopka 72'	Report	Hallgrímsson 20'

Müngersdorferstadion, Cologne
Attendance: 9,000
Referee: Henning Lund-Sørensen (Denmark)

13 September 1978

Juventus (Italy)	1–0	(Scotland) Rangers
Virdis 9'	Report

Stadio Olimpico Grande Torino, Turin
Attendance: 61,425
Referee: Nicolae Rainea (Romania)

13 September 1978

Fenerbahçe (Turkey)	2–1	(Netherlands) PSV Eindhoven
Çetiner 17'; İlhan 43'	Report	Brandts 23'

Şükrü Saracoğlu Stadium, Istanbul
Attendance: 42,000
Referee: Tome Manojlovski (Yugoslavia)

13 September 1978

Vllaznia (Albania)	2–0	Austria Wien
Zhega 8'; Ballgjini 55'	Report

Loro Boriçi Stadium. Shkodër
Attendance: 10,000
Referee: Otto Anderco (Romania)

13 September 1978

Linfield (Northern Ireland)	0–0	(Norway) Lillestrøm
	Report

Windsor Park, Belfast
Attendance: 4,700
Referee: Henk van Ettekoven (Netherlands)

13 September 1978

Omonia (Cyprus)	2–1	(Republic of Ireland) Bohemians
Kanaris 21'; Dimitriou 51'	Report	O'Connor 44'

Makario Stadium, Nicosia
Attendance: 11,000
Referee: Nikola Milanov Doudine (Bulgaria)

13 September 1978

Partizan (Socialist Federal Republic of Yugoslavia)	2–0	(East Germany) Dynamo Dresden
Prekazi 5'; Đurović 47'	Report

Jugoslavenska Narodna Armija, Belgrade
Attendance: 50,000
Referee: Hilmi Ok (Turkey)

13 September 1978

Zbrojovka Brno (Czechoslovakia)	2–2	(Hungary) Újpesti Dózsa
Kroupa 72'; Janečka 77'	Report	Fekete 40'; Törőcsik 65'

Stadion Za Lužánkami, Brno
Attendance: 18,000
Referee: Marian Kustoń (Poland)

13 September 1978

Club Brugge (Belgium)	2–1	(Poland) Wisła Kraków
Ceulemans 24'; Cools 28'	Report	Kapka 83'

Olympiastadion, Bruges
Attendance: 15,241
Referee: Malcolm Wright (Northern Ireland)

13 September 1978
19:00

Haka (Finland)	0–1	(Soviet Union) Dynamo Kyiv
	Report	Baltacha 74'

Ratina Stadium, Tampere (Note: Haka played their home match at Ratina Stadium, Tampere, as their regular stadium Tehtaan kenttä, Valkeakoski, did not have floodlights.)
Attendance: 4,000
Referee: Rolf Nyhus (Norway)

13 September 1978

Malmö FF (Sweden)	0–0	(France) Monaco
	Report

Malmö Stadium, Malmö
Attendance: 5,473
Referee: Adolf Prokop (East Germany)

=== Second leg ===
27 September 1978
21:45

Porto (Portugal)	4–1	(Greece) AEK Athens
Vital 63', 83'; Teixeira 79'; Gomes 88'	Report	Bajević 32'

Estádio das Antas, Porto
Attendance: 62,000
Referee: Charles Corver (Netherlands)

AEK Athens won 7–5 on aggregate.

27 September 1978

Liverpool (England)	0–0	(England) Nottingham Forest
	Report

Anfield, Liverpool
Attendance: 51,679
Referee: Georges Konrath (France)

Nottingham Forest won 2–0 on aggregate.

27 September 1978

Progrès Niedercorn (Luxembourg)	0–7	(Spain) Real Madrid
	Report	Pirri 10'; Jensen 19'; Stielike 28'; Santillana 46', 87'; García Hernández 65'; Margue 90' (o.g.)

Stade du Thillenberg, Differdange
Attendance: 4,250
Referee: Jan Peeters (Belgium)

Real Madrid won 12–0 on aggregate.

27 September 1978

Valletta (Malta)	3–5	(Switzerland) Grasshopper
Agius 56'; Seychell 83'; Farrugia 86'	Report	Sulser 13' (pen.); Ponte 61'; Traber 69', 78'; Her. Hermann 77'

Empire Stadium, Gżira
Attendance: 2,500
Referee: Franz Latzin (Austria)

Grasshopper won 13–3 on aggregate.

27 September 1978

Lokomotiv Sofia (Bulgaria)	2–1	(Denmark) Odense
Mihaylov 27'; Kostov 50'	Report	Eriksen 23' (pen.)

Stadion Vasil Levski, Sofia
Attendance: 25,000
Referee: Nihat Ozbirgül (Turkey)

Lokomotiv Sofia won 4–3 on aggregate.

27 September 1978

ÍA (Iceland)	1–1	(West Germany) Köln
Hein 8' (o.g.)	Report	Van Gool 72'

Laugardalsvöllur, Reykjavík
Attendance: 4,500
Referee: George Smith (Scotland)

Köln won 5–2 on aggregate.

27 September 1978

Rangers (Scotland)	2–0	(Italy) Juventus
MacDonald 18'; Smith 69'	Report

Ibrox Park, Glasgow
Attendance: 41,494
Referee: Walter Eschweiler (West Germany)

Rangers won 2–1 on aggregate.

27 September 1978

PSV Eindhoven (Netherlands)	6–1	(Turkey) Fenerbahçe
Van der Kuijlen 10', 22', 71', 74'; Deijkers 49', 55'	Report	Çetiner 87'

Philips Stadion, Eindhoven
Attendance: 22,000
Referee: David Syme (Scotland)

PSV Eindhoven won 7–3 on aggregate.

27 September 1978

Austria Wien	4–1	(Albania) Vllaznia
Parits 21'; Schachner 35', 74'; J. Sara 48'	Report	Hafizi 80'

Praterstadion, Wien
Attendance: 26,000
Referee: Antonin Vencl (Czechoslovakia)

Austria Wien won 4–3 on aggregate.

27 September 1978

Lillestrøm (Norway)	1–0	(Northern Ireland) Linfield
Lønstad 12'	Report

Ullevaal Stadion, Oslo
Attendance: 5,641
Referee: Horst di Carlo (East Germany)

Lillestrøm won 1–0 on aggregate.

27 September 1978

Bohemians (Republic of Ireland)	1–0	(Cyprus) Omonia
Joyce 27'	Report

Flower Lodge, Cork
Attendance: 4,500
Referee: Ron Bridges (Wales)

2–2 on aggregate; Bohemians won on away goals.

27 September 1978

Dynamo Dresden (East Germany)	2–0 (a.e.t.)	(Socialist Federal Republic of Yugoslavia) Partizan
Dörner 8'; Weber 38'	Report
Penalties
Dörner (penalty missed); Weber (penalty scored); Schade (penalty missed); Kotte (penalty scored); Riedel (penalty scored); Sachse (penalty scored); Schmuck (penalty scored)	5–4	(penalty missed) Đorđević; (penalty scored) Klinčarski; (penalty scored) Pavković; (penalty missed) Trifunović; (penalty scored) Prekazi; (penalty scored) Stojković; (penalty missed) Zavišić

Dynamostadion, Dresden
Attendance: 29,000
Referee: Valentin Lipatov (Soviet Union)

2–2 on aggregate; Dynamo Dresden won on penalties.

27 September 1978

Újpesti Dózsa (Hungary)	0–2	(Czechoslovakia) Zbrojovka Brno
	Report	Došek 11'; Kroupa 41'

Megyeri út, Budapest
Attendance: 18,000
Referee: Luigi Agnolin (Italy)

Zbrojovka Brno won 4–2 on aggregate.

27 September 1978

Wisła Kraków (Poland)	3–1	(Belgium) Club Brugge
Kmiecik 26'; Lipka 82'; Krupiński 89'	Report	Ceulemans 50'

Stadion Miejski, Kraków
Attendance: 25,000
Referee: Martti Hirviniemi (Finland)

Wisła Kraków won 4–3 on aggregate.

27 September 1978
19:00

Dynamo Kyiv (Soviet Union)	3–1	(Finland) Haka
Veremeyev 31'; Khapsalis 35'; Buryak 85'	Report	Ronkainen 71'

Stadion Metalist, Kharkiv (Note: Dynamo Kyiv played their home matches at Metalist Stadium, Kharkiv, instead of their regular stadium Central Stadium, Kyiv, due to reconstruction.)
Attendance: 40,516
Referee: Teodoros Tsanaklidis (Greece)

Dynamo Kyiv won 4–1 on aggregate.

27 September 1978

Monaco (France)	0–1	(Sweden) Malmö FF
	Report	Kindvall 35'

Stade Louis II, Monaco
Attendance: 8,470
Referee: Rudolf Frickel (West Germany)

Malmö FF won 1–0 on aggregate.

== Second round ==
Team 1	Agg.	Team 2	1st leg	2nd leg
AEK Athens (Greece)	2–7	(England) Nottingham Forest	1–2	1–5
Real Madrid (Spain)	3–3 (a)	(Switzerland) Grasshopper	3–1	0–2
Lokomotiv Sofia (Bulgaria)	0–5	(West Germany) Köln	0–1	0–4
Rangers (Scotland)	3–2	(Netherlands) PSV Eindhoven	0–0	3–2
Austria Wien	4–1	(Norway) Lillestrøm	4–1	0–0
Bohemians (Republic of Ireland)	0–6	(East Germany) Dynamo Dresden	0–0	0–6
Zbrojovka Brno (Czechoslovakia)	3–3 (a)	(Poland) Wisła Kraków	2–2	1–1
Dynamo Kyiv (Soviet Union)	0–2	(Sweden) Malmö FF	0–0	0–2

=== First leg ===
18 October 1978
20:30

AEK Athens (Greece)	1–2	(England) Nottingham Forest
Konstantinou 59' (pen.)	Report	McGovern 10'; Birtles 45'

AEK Stadium, Athens
Attendance: 35,000
Referee: Robert Wurtz (France)

18 October 1978

Real Madrid (Spain)	3–1	(Switzerland) Grasshopper
Juanito 5'; García Hernández 65'; Santillana 77'	Report	Sulser 59'

Santiago Bernabéu, Madrid
Attendance: 35,000
Referee: Michel Vautrot (France)

18 October 1978

Lokomotiv Sofia (Bulgaria)	0–1	(West Germany) Köln
	Report	Zimmermann 58'

Stadion Vasil Levski, Sofia
Attendance: 25,000
Referee: Johannes-Frederik Beck (Netherlands)

18 October 1978

Rangers (Scotland)	0–0	(Netherlands) PSV Eindhoven
	Report

Ibrox Stadium, Glasgow
Attendance: 44,000
Referee: Francis Rion (Belgium)

18 October 1978

Austria Wien	4–1	(Norway) Lillestrøm
Gasselich 25', 34'; Sara 36'; Schachner 65'	Report	Dokken 62'

Ernst-Happel-Stadion, Vienna
Attendance: 24,000
Referee: Bruno Galler (Switzerland)

18 October 1978

Bohemians (Republic of Ireland)	0–0	(East Germany) Dynamo Dresden
	Report

Oriel Park, Dundalk
Attendance: 2,160
Referee: Marcel Van Langenhove (Belgium)

18 October 1978

Zbrojovka Brno (Czechoslovakia)	2–2	(Poland) Wisła Kraków
Pešice 73'; Kroupa 78'	Report	Kmiecik 37'; Maculewicz 86'

Stadion Za Lužánkami, Brno
Attendance: 25,000
Referee: Eldar Azimzade (Soviet Union)

18 October 1978
19:00

Dynamo Kyiv (Soviet Union)	0–0	(Sweden) Malmö FF
	Report

Metalist Stadium, Kharkiv
Attendance: 40,000
Referee: André Daina (Switzerland)

=== Second leg ===
1 November 1978
20:30

Nottingham Forest (England)	5–1	(Greece) AEK Athens
Needham 12'; Woodcock 35'; Anderson 40'; Birtles 66', 72'	Report	Bajević 50'

City Ground, Nottingham
Attendance: 38,069
Referee: Ulf Eriksson (Sweden)

Nottingham Forest won 7–2 on aggregate.

1 November 1978

Grasshopper (Switzerland)	2–0	(Spain) Real Madrid
Sulser 8', 86'	Report

Hardturm, Zurich
Attendance: 28,000
Referee: Adolf Prokop (East Germany)

3–3 on aggregate; Grasshopper won on away goals.

1 November 1978

Köln (West Germany)	4–0	(Bulgaria) Lokomotiv Sofia
Müller 20', 79'; Van Gool 52'; Glowacz 75'	Report

Müngersdorferstadion, Cologne
Attendance: 17,000
Referee: Pat Partridge (England)

Köln won 5–0 on aggregate.

1 November 1978

PSV Eindhoven (Netherlands)	2–3	(Scotland) Rangers
Lubse 1'; Deijkers 60'	Report	MacDonald 57'; Johnstone 65'; Russell 87'

Philips Stadion, Eindhoven
Attendance: 27,000
Referee: Károly Palotai (Hungary)

Rangers won 3–2 on aggregate.

1 November 1978

Lillestrøm (Norway)	0–0	Austria Wien
	Report

Ullevaal Stadion, Oslo
Attendance: 5,589
Referee: Albert Victor (Luxembourg)

Austria Wien won 4–1 on aggregate.

1 November 1978

Dynamo Dresden (East Germany)	6–0	(Republic of Ireland) Bohemians
Trautmann 39', 58'; Dörner 41'; Schmuck 49'; Riedel 60'; Kotte 75' (pen.)	Report

Dynamo-Stadion, Dresden
Attendance: 33,000
Referee: Ole Amundsen (Denmark)

Dynamo Dresden won 6–0 on aggregate.

1 November 1978

Wisła Kraków (Poland)	1–1	(Czechoslovakia) Zbrojovka Brno
Kapka 53'	Report	Došek 78'

Stadion Miejski, Kraków
Attendance: 35,000
Referee: Dimitar Yordanov Parmakov (Bulgaria)

3–3 on aggregate; Wisła Kraków won on away goals.

1 November 1978
19:00

Malmö FF (Sweden)	2–0	(Soviet Union) Dynamo Kyiv
Cervin 9'; Kindvall 39'	Report

Malmö Stadion, Malmö
Attendance: 13,602
Referee: John Hunting (England)

Malmö FF won 2–0 on aggregate.

== Quarter-finals ==
Team 1	Agg.	Team 2	1st leg	2nd leg
Nottingham Forest (England)	5–2	(Switzerland) Grasshopper	4–1	1–1
Köln (West Germany)	2–1	(Scotland) Rangers	1–0	1–1
Austria Wien	3–2	(East Germany) Dynamo Dresden	3–1	0–1
Wisła Kraków (Poland)	3–5	(Sweden) Malmö FF	2–1	1–4

=== First leg ===
7 March 1979

Nottingham Forest (England)	4–1	(Switzerland) Grasshopper
Birtles 31'; Robertson 47' (pen.); Gemmill 87'; Lloyd 89'	Report	Sulser 11'

City Ground, Nottingham
Attendance: 31,949
Referee: Marjan Rauš (Yugoslavia)

6 March 1979

Köln (West Germany)	1–0	(Scotland) Rangers
Müller 58'	Report

Müngersdorferstadion, Cologne
Attendance: 36,000
Referee: Erik Fredriksson (Sweden)

7 March 1979

Austria Wien	3–1	(East Germany) Dynamo Dresden
Schachner 20', 90'; Zach 86'		Weber 9'

Ernst-Happel-Stadion, Vienna
Attendance: 36,000
Referee: Pat Partridge (England)

7 March 1979

Wisła Kraków (Poland)	2–1	(Sweden) Malmö FF
Nawałka 26'; Kmiecik 85'	Report	Hansson 13'

Stadion Miejski, Kraków
Attendance: 35,000
Referee: Talat Tokat (Turkey)

=== Second leg ===
21 March 1979

Grasshopper (Switzerland)	1–1	(England) Nottingham Forest
Sulser 33' (pen.)	Report	O'Neill 38'

Hardturm, Zurich
Attendance: 17,800
Referee: Gianfranco Menegali (Italy)

Nottingham Forest won 5–2 on aggregate.

22 March 1979

Rangers (Scotland)	1–1	(West Germany) Köln
McLean 86'	Report	Müller 48'

Ibrox Stadium, Glasgow
Attendance: 44,000
Referee: Ángel Franco Martínez (Spain)

Köln won 2–1 on aggregate.

21 March 1979

Dynamo Dresden (East Germany)	1–0	Austria Wien
Riedel 42' (pen.)	Report

Dynamo-Stadion, Dresden
Attendance: 35,000
Referee: Jan Keizer (Royal Dutch Football Association)

Austria Wien won 3–2 on aggregate.

21 March 1979

Malmö FF (Sweden)	4–1	(Poland) Wisła Kraków
Ljungberg 65' (pen.), 72', 90' (pen.); Cervin 82'	Report	Kmiecik 58'

Malmö Stadion, Malmö
Attendance: 12,469
Referee: Walter Eschweiler (West Germany)

Malmö FF won 5–3 on aggregate.

== Semi-finals ==
Team 1	Agg.	Team 2	1st leg	2nd leg
Nottingham Forest (England)	4–3	(West Germany) Köln	3–3	1–0
Austria Wien	0–1	(Sweden) Malmö FF	0–0	0–1

=== First leg ===
11 April 1979

Nottingham Forest (England)	3–3	(West Germany) Köln
Birtles 28'; Bowyer 53'; Robertson 63'	Report	Van Gool 6'; Müller 20'; Okudera 85'

City Ground, Nottingham
Attendance: 40,804
Referee: António Garrido (Portugal)

11 April 1979

Austria Wien	0–0	(Sweden) Malmö FF
	Report

Praterstadion, Wien
Attendance: 64,000
Referee: Alek Jarguz (Poland)

=== Second leg ===
25 April 1979

Köln (West Germany)	0–1	(England) Nottingham Forest
	Report	Bowyer 65'

Müngersdorfer Stadion, Cologne
Attendance: 60,000
Referee: Nicolae Rainea (Romania)

Nottingham Forest won 4–3 on aggregate.

25 April 1979

Malmö FF (Sweden)	1–0	Austria Wien
Hansson 47'	Report

Malmö Stadion, Malmö
Attendance: 25,239
Referee: Robert Wurtz (France)

Malmö FF won 1–0 on aggregate.

== Final ==
30 May 1979
20:15 CEST

Malmö FF (Sweden)	0–1	(England) Nottingham Forest
	Report	Francis 45'

Olympiastadion, Munich
Attendance: 57,500
Referee: Erich Linemayr (Austria)

== Top scorers ==
The top scorers from the 1978–79 European Cup (excluding preliminary round) are as follows:

Rank	Name	Team	Goals
1	(Switzerland) Claudio Sulser	(Switzerland) Grasshopper	11
2	(England) Garry Birtles	(England) Nottingham Forest	6
3	(Germany) Dieter Müller	(Germany) Köln	5
3	(Austria) Walter Schachner	Austria Wien	5
5	(Socialist Federal Republic of Yugoslavia) Dušan Bajević	(Greece) AEK Athens	4
5	(Poland) Kazimierz Kmiecik	(Poland) Wisła Kraków	4
5	(Netherlands) Willy van der Kuijlen	(Netherlands) PSV Eindhoven	4
8	(Netherlands) Gerrie Deijkers	(Netherlands) PSV Eindhoven	3
8	(Belgium) Roger van Gool	(Germany) Köln	3
8	(Spain) Juanito	(Spain) Real Madrid	3
8	(Czechoslovakia) Karel Kroupa	(Czechoslovakia) Zbrojovka Brno	3
8	(Sweden) Anders Ljungberg	(Sweden) Malmö FF	3
8	(Switzerland) Raimondo Ponte	(Switzerland) Grasshopper	3
8	(Spain) Santillana	(Spain) Real Madrid	3
