= Ingemar Erlandsson =

Swedish footballer (1957–2022)

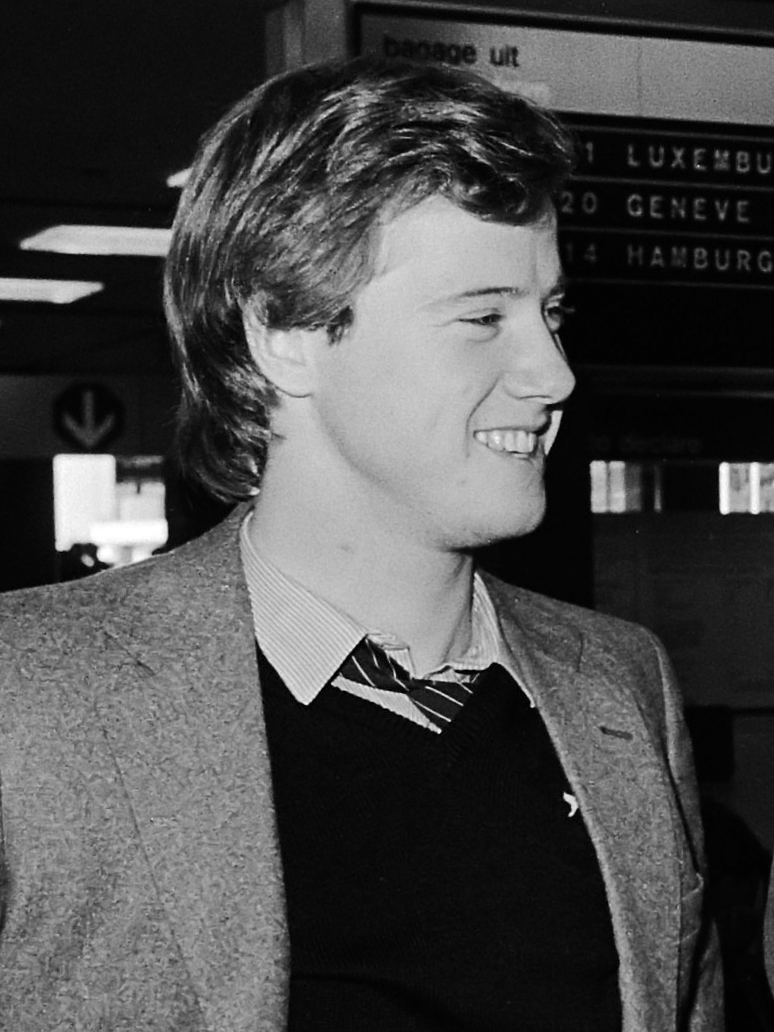
- Erlandsson in 1979

Personal information
- Full name: Bo Ingemar Erlandsson
- Date of birth: 16 November 1957
- Place of birth: Glimåkra, Sweden
- Date of death: 9 August 2022 (aged 64)
- Height: 1.77 m (5 ft 10 in)
- Position: Defender

Senior career*
Years	Team	Apps	(Gls)
1976–1987	Malmö FF	258	(16)

International career
1978–1985	Sweden	69	(2)
- * Club domestic league appearances and goals

Bo Ingemar Erlandsson (16 November 1957 – 9 August 2022) was a Swedish footballer who played as a defender. He represented Malmö FF between 1976 and 1987. A full international between 1978 and 1985, he won 69 caps and scored two goals for the Sweden national team and represented his country at the 1978 FIFA World Cup.

== Club career ==
Erlandsson played for Malmö FF in Allsvenskan. He became Swedish champion with the club in 1977 and 1986, and was a part of the team in the European Champions Cup final in 1979 against Nottingham Forest.

== International career ==
He was a member of the Sweden national team, and was capped 69 times between 1978 and 1985. He was in the squad for the 1978 FIFA World Cup.

== Post-playing career ==
After retiring, he was a member of the board of directors of Malmö FF.

== Death ==
Erlandsson died on 9 August 2022, at the age of 64.

== Career statistics ==
Appearances and goals by national team and year
National team	Year	Apps	Goals
Sweden	1978	7	0
Sweden	1979	7	1
Sweden	1980	8	0
Sweden	1981	10	0
Sweden	1982	9	0
Sweden	1983	12	0
Sweden	1984	9	1
Sweden	1985	7	0
Total		69	2

Scores and results list Sweden's goal tally first, score column indicates score after each Erlandsson goal.

List of international goals scored by Ingemar Erlandsson
No.	Date	Venue	Opponent	Score	Result	Competition	Ref.
1	9 May 1979	Parken, Copenhagen, Denmark	Denmark	1–0	2–2	Friendly	
2	23 May 1984	Idrottsparken, Norrköping, Sweden	Malta	3–0	4–0	1986 FIFA World Cup qualification	

== Honours ==
Malmö FF

- Swedish Champion: 1977, 1986
- Svenska Cupen: 1977–78, 1979–80, 1983–84, 1985–86
