= Erich Linemayr =

Austrian football referee (1933–2016)

- Born: 24 January 1933; Linz, Austria
- Died: 4 June 2016 (aged 83)

International
Years	League	Role
1968–1981	FIFA-listed	Referee

Erich Linemayr (24 January 1933 in Linz – 4 June 2016) was an Austrian football referee. He is known for having refereed three matches in the FIFA World Cup, two in 1974 and one in 1978. He also refereed two matches in the 1980 UEFA European Championship in Italy and the European Cup final in 1979.

His most unusual match was the return game of the UEFA–CONMEBOL play-off between Chile and the Soviet Union (who had refused to travel to Santiago for the match) on 21 November 1973. When Chile scored a goal after 30 seconds, Linemayr immediately blew off the game and declared them winners.

Preceded by European Cup Final 1978 (Netherlands) Charles Corver	European Cup; Final 1979 (Austria) Erich Linemayr	Succeeded by European Cup Final 1980 (Portugal) António Garrido
