= Kent Jönsson =

Swedish footballer

Personal information
- Full name: Kent Jönsson
- Date of birth: 9 May 1955 (age 71)
- Place of birth: Sweden
- Position: Defender

Senior career*
Years	Team	Apps	(Gls)
–1974	Lunds BoIS		
1974–1987	Malmö FF	211	(5)
1988–?	IFK Trelleborg		

International career
1979–1980	Sweden	5	(0)
- * Club domestic league appearances and goals

Kent Jönsson (born 9 May 1955) is a Swedish former football defender who played the majority of his career for Malmö FF.

== Career ==
Jönsson transferred from Lunds BoIS to Malmö FF in 1974 where it took him a while until he grabbed a spot in the starting line-up. It wasn't until Bo Larsson, a former forward who now played as defender, was injured during the quarter-finals of the 1978–79 European Cup away against Wisla Krakow. Malmö made it all the way to the final and Jönsson was in the starting line-up for Malmö who ultimately lost the game 1–0 at the Olympic Stadium in Munich. Jönsson won Allsvenskan two times with the club. During the end of his career he transferred to IFK Trelleborg where he briefly was a youth coach after his career had ended.
