= Tommy Hansson =

Swedish footballer

Personal information
- Full name: Tommy Hansson
- Date of birth: 9 January 1956 (age 70)
- Place of birth: Sweden
- Position: Forward

Youth career
- BK Kick

Senior career*
Years	Team	Apps	(Gls)
1975–1981	Malmö FF	85	(25)
- IFK Malmö
- Lunds BK
- Trelleborgs FF

International career
1977	Sweden	1	(0)
- * Club domestic league appearances and goals

Tommy Hansson (born 9 January 1956) is a Swedish former footballer who played as a forward. Hansson is notable for scoring the goal that made his club Malmö FF advance to the 1979 European Cup Final.

== Honours ==
Malmö FF

- Allsvenskan: 1977
