= Claes Malmberg (footballer) =

Swedish footballer

Personal information
- Full name: Claes Göran Malmberg
- Date of birth: 11 March 1952 (age 74)
- Position: Midfielder

Senior career*
Years	Team	Apps	(Gls)
1974–1980	Malmö FF	61	(1)
1980–1982	Landskrona BoIS		
- * Club domestic league appearances and goals

Claes Göran Malmberg (born 11 March 1952) is a Swedish former footballer who played as a midfielder.
