= Anders Ljungberg =

Swedish footballer (born 1947)

Personal information
- Full name: Anders Ljungberg
- Date of birth: 12 July 1947 (age 79)
- Place of birth: Sweden
- Position: Midfielder

Senior career*
Years	Team	Apps	(Gls)
1967–1968	Malmö FF		
1969–1971	Åtvidabergs FF		
1972–1979	Malmö FF	254	(35)
1979	Limhamns IF		
1979–1981	Landskrona BoIS		
1981–1982	Örebro SK		

International career
1969-1977	Sweden	8	(1)

Managerial career
- 1995–1996: Landskrona BoIS
- * Club domestic league appearances and goals

Anders Ljungberg (born 12 July 1947) is a Swedish former footballer who played as a midfielder. He was nicknamed "Puskas" after the Hungarian footballer of the same name.

== Club career ==
Ljungberg is most known for being part of the Malmö FF team that reached the 1979 European Cup Final. He won five national championships and six cup titles during his time with Malmö.

== Coach career ==
Ljungberg was coach of Landskrona BoIS from 1995 to 1996.

== Personal life ==
Today, Ljungberg is an upper secondary school teacher in Trelleborg, Sweden.
