= Magnus Andersson (footballer, born 1958) =

Swedish footballer (born 1958)

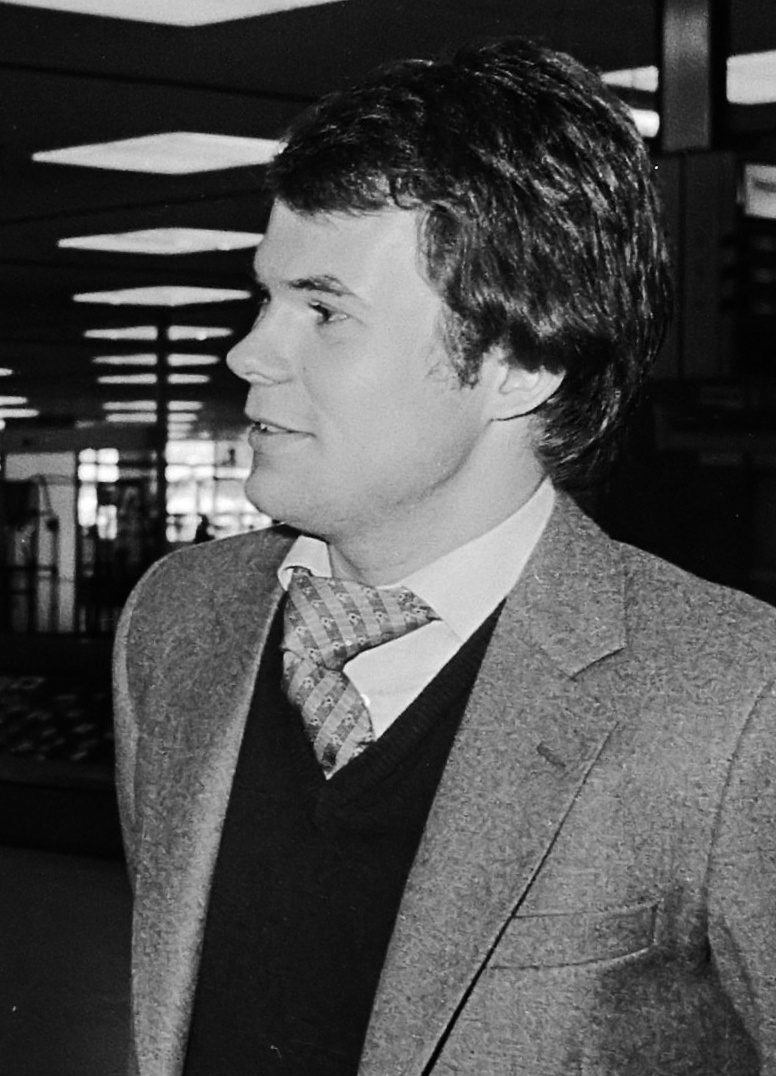
- Magnus Andersson in 1979.

Personal information
- Date of birth: 23 April 1958 (age 68)
- Place of birth: Sweden
- Position: Defender

Senior career*
| Years | Team | Apps | (Gls) |
| 1975–1988 | Malmö FF | 285 | (12) |

International career
| 1977–1987 | Sweden | 11 | (1) |
- * Club domestic league appearances and goals

Magnus Andersson (born 23 April 1958) is a Swedish former footballer who played as a defender.

== Career ==
Andersson played for Malmö FF in the 1970s and the 1980s. He played in the European Champions Cup final in 1979 against Nottingham Forest F.C. and was a member of the Sweden men's national football team in the 1978 FIFA World Cup.

Sporting positions
| Preceded by Ingemar Erlandsson | Malmö FF; Captain; 1988 | Succeeded by Roger Ljung |
