= Jan Möller =

Swedish footballer

Personal information
- Full name: Jan Börje Möller
- Date of birth: 17 September 1953 (age 73)
- Place of birth: Malmö, Sweden
- Height: 1.94 m (6 ft 4 in)
- Position: Goalkeeper

Youth career
- –1971: Malmö FF

Senior career*
Years	Team	Apps	(Gls)
1971–1980	Malmö FF	195	(0)
1980–1982	Bristol City	48	(0)
1982–1983	Toronto Blizzard	55	(0)
1984–1988	Malmö FF	118	(1)
1989–1991	Helsingborgs IF	51	(0)
1992–1993	Trelleborgs FF	17	(0)
Total		484	(1)

International career
1979–1988	Sweden	17	(0)
- * Club domestic league appearances and goals

Jan Börje Möller (born 17 September 1953) is a Swedish former professional footballer who played as a goalkeeper. Starting off his career with Malmö FF, he went on to represent also Bristol City, Toronto Blizzard, Helsingborgs IF, and Trelleborgs FF during a career that spanned between 1971 and 1993. A full international between 1979 and 1988, he won 17 caps for the Sweden national team and represented his country at the 1978 FIFA World Cup. In 1979, he was awarded Guldbollen as Sweden's best footballer of the year.

== Club career ==
Möller had a successful 16-year career for Malmö FF during the 1970s and 1980s (two different spells), appearing in the 1978–79 European Cup final against Nottingham Forest, a 0–1 loss in Munich. He also played for Helsingborgs IF, Bristol City of England, Toronto Blizzard of Canada (following his former manager at Malmö, Bob Houghton, to both clubs), and Trelleborgs FF, retiring professionally at the age of 40; in 1979, he was awarded the Guldbollen.

== International career ==
Möller was a Sweden international on 17 occasions, and was on squad for the 1978 FIFA World Cup in Argentina, as a backup, along with Göran Hagberg, to Ronnie Hellström.

== Honours ==
Malmö FF

- Allsvenskan: 1974, 1975, 1977, 1985, 1986, 1987, 1988
- Swedish Champion: 1974, 1975, 1977, 1986, 1988
- Swedish Cup: 1973, 1974, 1975, 1978, 1980, 1984, 1986

Individual

- Guldbollen: 1979
