= Mats Arvidsson =

Swedish footballer

Personal information
- Full name: Mats Arvidsson
- Date of birth: 19 April 1958 (age 68)
- Place of birth: Sweden
- Position: Defender

Senior career*
| Years | Team | Apps | (Gls) |
| 1978–1987 | Malmö FF | 127 | (10) |
- * Club domestic league appearances and goals

Mats Arvidsson (born 19 April 1958) is a Swedish former footballer who played as a defender.

Arvidsson played for Malmö FF, making 127 appearances for the one club he played for.
