= Bob Houghton =

English footballer and manager (born 1947)

Bobby Houghton
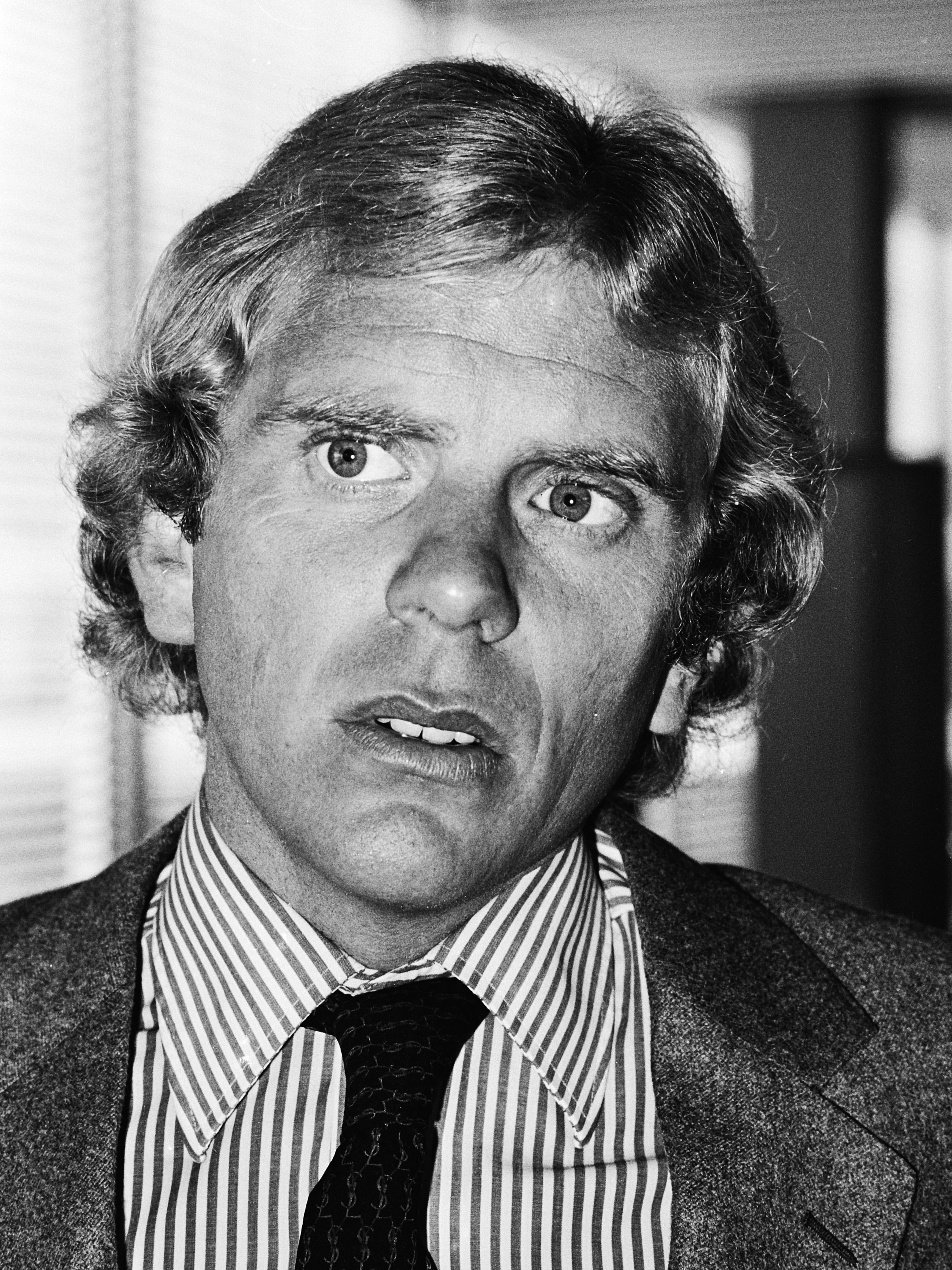
- Houghton in 1979

Personal information
- Full name: Robert Douglas Houghton
- Date of birth: 30 October 1947 (age 78)
- Place of birth: England

Senior career*
Years	Team	Apps	(Gls)
1966–1969	Fulham	0	(0)
1969–1970	Brighton & Hove Albion	0	(0)
1970–1971	Hastings United	65	(14)
1971–1972	Maidstone United		

Managerial career
- 1970–1971: Hastings United
- 1971–1972: Maidstone United
- 1974–1980: Malmö FF
- 1980: Ethnikos Piraeus
- 1980–1982: Bristol City
- 1982–1984: Toronto Blizzard
- 1984–1986: Al-Ittihad
- 1987–1988: Örgryte IS
- 1989: Al-Ittihad
- 1990–1992: Malmö FF
- 1993: Al-Ittihad
- 1994–1995: FC Zürich
- 1996: Colorado Rapids
- 1997–1999: China
- 2000: Shanghai Pudong
- 2001: Sichuan Quanxing
- 2002–2003: Zhejiang Greentown
- 2005: Uzbekistan
- 2005–2006: Changsha Ginde
- 2006–2011: India
Medal record
Men's football
Representing India (as manager)
AFC Challenge Cup
Winner	2008
- * Club domestic league appearances and goals

Robert Douglas Houghton (born 30 October 1947) is an English football manager and former player. His career has spanned over 30 years and 10 countries. He guided Swedish club Malmö FF to the 1979 European Cup final, where they lost to Nottingham Forest.

At 31 years old, Bob Houghton became the youngest coach ever to reach a major UEFA final with Malmö FF, 1979 runner-up.

== Career ==
=== Early career ===
During his brief playing career, Houghton was a midfielder for Fulham (1966–69) and Brighton & Hove Albion (1969–70). Houghton was one of the youngest coaches ever to manage in English senior football, being appointed player-manager of Hastings United in the Southern League at only 23. During that period, he was a star pupil of coaching guru Allen Wade, who was the technical director of the Football Association between 1963 and 83. In the early 1970s Houghton also managed Maidstone United and worked as an assistant to Bobby Robson at Ipswich Town.

=== Malmö FF ===
He became the manager of Swedish top flight side Malmö FF in 1974. Houghton guided them to success domestically and internationally, reaching the 1979 European Cup final, losing 1–0 against Nottingham Forest. The Swedish team was all based on local players who came from within 60 km from Malmö. It was the first and so far only time a Swedish team has reached the European Cup final.

He also won the Swedish championship and Svenska Cupen several times and was runner-up in the Intercontinental Cup in 1979 as Nottingham Forest declined to participate, losing against Olimpia from Paraguay.

=== Revolution in Sweden ===
Houghton's early coaching career was closely linked to that of his friend Roy Hodgson. They worked together at Maidstone, Stranraer and Bristol City. They also managed different teams in Swedish football at the same time.

Houghton moved to Sweden with Malmö in 1974 and two years later installed Hodgson at Halmstad. The pair are credited with transforming football in Sweden and bringing in zonal marking for the first time to Swedish football. Swedish teams at the time used a sweeper with 3 or 5 in defence favouring man-marking. The two were known in Sweden as English Roy and English Bob.

Besides zonal marking, the defence pressed hard and maintained a high offside line. Their teams counter-attacked with long passes played in behind the opposition defence. Instead of playing with a team that was very spread out from one end of the field to the other, with a libero who stayed in his penalty area and a centre-forward who never tracked back, they set up a system of zonal defence, a back four, players pushing up and getting the ball forward into the final area much more quickly.

=== 1980s and 1990s ===
After a short spell in Greece with Ethnikos Piraeus, Houghton returned to his homeland in 1980 to manage Bristol City. His spell at Ashton Gate Stadium was unsuccessful as the financially stricken club were relegated and Houghton resigned after a defeat to Wimbledon. Houghton's next job was with North American Soccer League side Toronto Blizzard between 1982 and 1984. He then managed in Saudi Arabia with Al-Ittihad before returning to Sweden at Örgryte IS and Malmö FF again. After another spell with Al-Ittihad in 1993, he joined Swiss side FC Zürich in April 1994 and remained in charge for just over a year before leaving in March 1995. In 1996, he became the first ever coach of Major League Soccer side Colorado Rapids before being dismissed after just one season.

=== International management ===
==== China ====
Houghton then assumed control of the Chinese national team in late 1997, who had just failed to qualify for the 1998 World Cup. Within weeks, Houghton was able to memorise the names of all his players, a rare feat in foreign coaches, and helped build the team's confidence and self-belief. China were placed second in the Dynasty Cup very shortly after Houghton took over, and he developed a reputation for being able to implement an effective technical football program for struggling teams. They also attained a bronze medal at the 1998 Asian Games. After failing to qualify for the 2000 Olympic football tournament, Houghton left as manager of the Chinese national team in 1999. He later had several spells as a club manager in China and was also a coaching instructor.

==== Uzbekistan ====
He had a spell in charge of Uzbekistan in 2005 when he was charged with qualifying for the 2006 World Cup though his attempt failed after losing a controversial play-off tie against Bahrain. Uzbekistan won the first match 1–0 but FIFA declared the result void after a refereeing mistake, and Uzbekistan were eliminated on the away goals rule.

==== India ====
After coaching Chinese side Changsha Ginde for a few months, Houghton was then appointed head coach of India in June 2006 by the All India Football Federation. His appointment saw a general progress in India's performances crowned by victory in the Nehru Cup in August 2007. The following year India suffered a huge loss when Maldives defeated them at the final of 2008 SAFF Championship, despite a 100% record in the group stage, including a victory over the Maldives. However, Houghton led India to the AFC Challenge Cup title as they defeated Tajikistan 4–1 in August 2008, which gave India a berth at the 2011 Asian Cup in Doha. He also oversaw the Indian team to its second consecutive Nehru Cup trophy win in 2009. He resigned in 2010 after not being able to reach a new contract deal. He later confirmed that his contract had been renewed until 2013, but hinted that he might review his decision after the 2011 Asian Cup.

At the Asian Cup, India, the lowest-ranked team in the tournament, lost all of their three group matches as predicted. Despite this, India's football authorities expressed disappointment over the national team's performance and the All India Football Federation (AIFF) technical committee urged the executive committee to dismiss Houghton. On 23 April 2011, Houghton tendered his immediate resignation as the India national team coach, which the AIFF accepted. Houghton's last assignment as Indian coach was the AFC Challenge Cup 2012 qualifiers in Malaysia, where India topped Group B which included Pakistan, Chinese Taipei and Turkmenistan.

== Style of management ==
In a 2012 article for The Guardian, Jonathan Wilson said that Houghton, like his compatriot Roy Hodgson, employed a zonal defence while coaching in the Allsvenskan, and that his teams pressed hard and maintained a high back-line, making use of the offside trap. They also utilised counter-attacks that were initiated with long passes played in behind the opposing defensive line. Swedish academic Tomas Peterson believed that the managers "threaded together a number of principles, which could be used in a series of combinations and compositions, and moulded them into an organic totality — an indivisible project about how to play football. Every moment of the match was theorised, and placed as an object-lesson for training-teaching, and was looked at in a totality."

In an article with The Blizzard, Hodgson said that he and Houghton were attempting to introduce a different style of defending in Swedish football, rather than elements of English football, such as the long-ball game, stating: "Instead of playing with a team that was very spread out from one end of the field to the other, with a libero who stays in his penalty area and a centre-forward who never tracks back, we set up a system of zonal defence, a back four, people pushing up and, of course, getting the ball forward into the final area much more quickly." He also believed that Sven-Göran Eriksson's tactical innovations in the Swedish game were inspired by their own work.

== Managerial statistics ==
As of 12 May 2026

Managerial record by team and tenure
Team	Nat.	From	To	Record								Ref
Team	Nat.	From	To	G	W	D	L	GF	GA	GD	Win %	Ref
Malmö	(Sweden)	1 January 1974	31 December 1979	237	134	62	41	379	189	+190	56.54	
Malmö	(Sweden)	1 January 1990	30 June 1992	75	25	30	20	80	64	+16	33.33	
China	(China)	1 February 1998	10 December 1999	15	9	3	3	35	12	+23	60.00	
Uzbekistan	(Uzbekistan)	17 August 2005	12 October 2005	4	2	2	0	5	3	+2	50.00	
India	(India)	1 July 2006	23 April 2011	54	22	7	25	73	90	−17	40.74	
Career total				385	192	104	89	572	358	+214	49.87	—

== Honours ==
=== Manager ===
Malmö FF

- Allsvenskan: 1974, 1975, 1977
- Svenska Cupen: 1973–74, 1974–75, 1977–78, 1979–80
- European Cup: runner-up: 1978–79

India

- AFC Challenge Cup: 2008
- SAFF Championship runner-up: 2008
- Nehru Cup: 2007, 2009

Al-Ittihad

- Saudi Federation Cup: 1987

Sporting positions
Preceded by Dave Turner	Toronto Blizzard head coach 1982–1984	League defunct
Preceded by Vanderlei Luxemburgo	Al-Ittihad (Jeddah) manager 1984–1986	Succeeded by Walter Skocik
Preceded by Syed Nayeemuddin	India national football team coach 2006–2011	Succeeded by Armando Colaco
