= Jan-Olov Kindvall =

Swedish footballer (born 1960)

Personal information
- Full name: Jan-Olov Kindvall
- Date of birth: 8 May 1960 (age 66)
- Position: Midfielder

Senior career*
Years	Team	Apps	(Gls)
1978–1983	Malmö FF	61	(4)
1984–1988	Lunds BK	67	(16)
- * Club domestic league appearances and goals

Jan-Olov Kindvall (born 8 May 1960) is a Swedish former footballer who played as a midfielder. He was born in Sweden to parents Kaj and Kerstin Kindvall and he is the brother of three sisters and he was signed to MFF when he was 16 years old. Jan-Olov Kindvall currently works at MFF. During his career, his name was sometimes misspelled as "Kinnvall".
