= Tore Cervin =

Swedish footballer (born 1950)

Personal information
- Full name: Tore Cervin
- Date of birth: 2 August 1950 (age 76)
- Place of birth: Malmö, Sweden
- Position: Forward

Youth career
- 1970–1972: BK Lydia

Senior career*
Years	Team	Apps	(Gls)
1972–1980	Malmö FF	126	(55)
1981	Toronto Blizzard	23	(9)
1982–1983	Limhamns IF	62	(30)
1984–1985	Helsingborgs IF	18	(1)
Total		229	(95)

International career
1975–1979	Sweden	4	(1)
- * Club domestic league appearances and goals

Tore Cervin (born 2 August 1950) is a Swedish former footballerwho played as a forward.

== Honours ==
Malmö FF

- Allsvenskan: 1974, 1975, 1977
- Svenska Cupen: 1972–73, 1973–74, 1974-75, 1977–78, 1979–80
