= 1977 Allsvenskan =

53rd season of Allsvenskan

Allsvenskan
- Season: 1977
- Champions: Malmö FF
- Relegated: IFK Sundsvall; BK Derby
- European Cup: Malmö FF
- UEFA Cup: IF Elfsborg; IFK Norrköping
- Top goalscorer: Reine Almqvist, IFK Göteborg; Mats Aronsson, Landskrona BoIS (15)
- Average attendance: 8,733

Statistics of Allsvenskan in season 1977.

== Overview ==
The league was contested by 14 teams, with Malmö FF winning the championship.

== League table ==
Pos	Team	Pld	W	D	L	GF	GA	GD	Pts	Qualification or relegation
1	Malmö FF (C)	26	15	8	3	41	19	+22	38	Qualification to European Cup first round
2	IF Elfsborg	26	10	11	5	37	23	+14	31	Qualification to UEFA Cup first round
3	Kalmar FF	26	12	7	7	37	30	+7	31	Qualification to Cup Winners' Cup first round (Note: Kalmar FF qualified for the European Cup Winners' Cup as Svenska Cupen runners-up 1977–78.)
4	IFK Norrköping	26	11	9	6	42	36	+6	31	Qualification to UEFA Cup first round
5	Landskrona BoIS	26	12	5	9	43	34	+9	29	
6	IFK Göteborg	26	9	9	8	48	49	−1	27	
7	Hammarby IF	26	10	6	10	28	37	−9	26	
8	Halmstads BK	26	8	9	9	39	33	+6	25	
9	Östers IF	26	8	9	9	31	25	+6	25	
10	Djurgårdens IF	26	7	10	9	34	37	−3	24	
11	AIK	26	5	13	8	31	37	−6	23	
12	Örebro SK	26	6	10	10	30	35	−5	22	
13	IFK Sundsvall (R)	26	5	10	11	32	43	−11	20	Relegation to Division 2
14	Derby (R)	26	3	6	17	18	53	−35	12	Relegation to Division 2

Rules for classification: 1) points; 2) goal difference; 3) number of goals scored.
(C) Champions; (R) Relegated

== Results ==
Home \ Away	AIK	BKD	DIF	HBK	HIF	IFE	IFKG	IFKN	IFKS	KFF	BOIS	MFF	ÖSK	ÖIF
AIK		0–0	2–0	2–2	0–3	1–1	3–6	1–2	2–2	1–1	3–0	1–1	3–3	2–1
BK Derby	1–0		1–4	1–1	0–0	0–3	0–0	0–1	2–0	1–0	1–5	0–5	2–2	2–2
Djurgårdens IF	1–1	2–1		1–1	1–1	0–2	4–0	0–0	2–2	4–0	1–2	0–1	1–0	2–2
Halmstads BK	1–1	2–0	4–0		4–0	1–0	2–1	4–0	3–0	0–0	0–1	3–1	0–0	1–3
Hammarby IF	0–0	3–1	3–1	2–1		1–1	0–3	2–0	0–2	0–1	1–2	1–2	2–1	1–0
IF Elfsborg	1–0	4–0	0–0	2–2	2–1		4–0	1–1	1–1	1–3	2–2	0–2	2–0	0–0
IFK Göteborg	1–1	4–1	2–2	2–2	3–2	1–2		1–1	2–0	2–2	4–1	0–1	0–0	4–1
IFK Norrköping	5–0	2–1	1–2	2–2	0–0	1–1	1–3		5–3	3–1	0–3	2–2	1–1	1–0
IFK Sundsvall	1–1	1–0	2–0	2–0	0–1	1–2	2–3	4–6		2–2	0–0	1–1	0–0	0–1
Kalmar FF	2–1	4–2	3–1	1–0	1–1	2–0	5–1	0–2	1–1		1–0	0–1	1–0	1–0
Landskrona BoIS	0–2	3–1	1–2	3–1	4–0	0–3	1–1	2–1	2–2	1–3		1–1	3–2	4–0
Malmö FF	1–3	1–0	3–1	2–1	6–0	1–1	1–0	0–0	2–3	2–0	1–0		1–1	1–0
Örebro SK	1–0	1–0	2–2	3–0	1–2	2–1	4–4	1–2	2–0	2–1	0–2	0–1		1–1
Östers IF	0–0	3–0	0–0	3–1	0–1	0–0	6–0	1–2	2–1	1–1	1–0	0–0	3–0	

Legend: Blue = home team win; Yellow = draw; Red = away team win.

== Attendances ==
No.	Club	Average attendance	Highest attendance
1	IFK Göteborg	23,796	48,296
2	IF Elfsborg	10,916	20,071
3	Malmö FF	10,875	26,643
4	AIK	9,319	26,157
5	Hammarby IF	8,863	22,451
6	Halmstads BK	8,761	15,650
7	Djurgårdens IF	8,143	28,212
8	IFK Norrköping	7,330	15,834
9	Kalmar FF	6,866	12,384
10	IFK Sundsvall	6,152	8,024
11	Östers IF	5,879	17,177
12	Landskrona BoIS	5,538	10,849
13	Örebro SK	5,151	10,032
14	BK Derby	4,659	9,655
