= List of Malmö FF seasons =

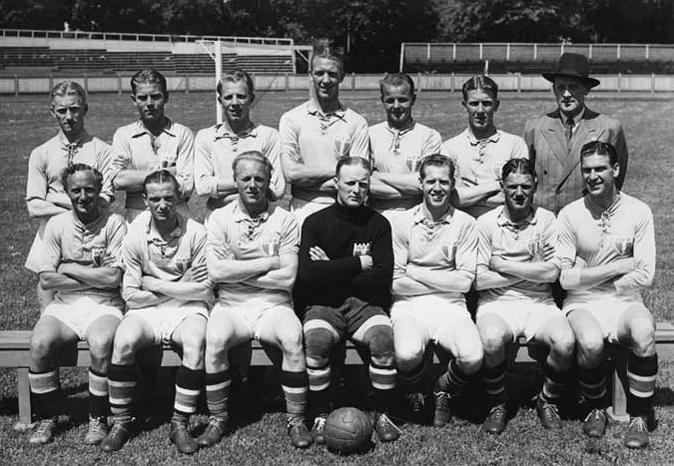
The Malmö FF team of 1943–44, when the club won Allsvenskan for the first time

Malmö Fotbollförening, commonly called Malmö FF, is a Swedish professional association football club based in Malmö, whose first team play in the highest tier of Swedish football, Allsvenskan, as of the 2024 season. Malmö FF was founded on 24 February 1910 by 19 members of a predecessor club named BK Idrott who, for a short time, had been merged with cross-town rivals IFK Malmö. After participating in regional competitions and national cup play in Svenska Mästerskapet during the 1910s, Malmö FF joined Sweden's newly created national league system in 1920, and played in the second tier of Swedish football for the next decade – with the exception of one season in Svenska Serien, then unofficially the top football league in Sweden. Allsvenskan was established as Sweden's official first tier in 1924, and Malmö FF first took part in 1931.

The Swedish Football Association prohibited professionalism until 1967, and Malmö FF were demoted in 1934 for having paid players. They were promoted back in 1936, and have since had several periods of consistent success, most notably in the early 1950s, the 1970s, the 1980s, and 2010s. The pinnacle of the club's history came in 1979, when, as finalists in both the European Cup and Intercontinental Cup, Malmö FF were ranked as one of the strongest clubs in the world. After winning a record five consecutive Allsvenskan titles between 1985 and 1989, the club won nothing during the 1990s and were relegated for the first time in 1999, though they returned to the top flight a year later. They have since remained in Allsvenskan, and won an additional ten league titles.

As of the end of the 2025 season, Malmö FF have played 114 seasons, 104 of which have been spent within the Swedish league system. The club have contested Allsvenskan 90 times, and have won the competition on 27 occasions. Malmö FF have been demoted once (in 1934) and relegated once (in 1999); their 63 successive Allsvenskan seasons between 1936 and 1999 is a league record. Their worst league finish to date is sixth in the second tier, their placing at the end of the 1926–27 season. The 1950 season was Malmö FF's best in terms of league performance: the team were unbeaten all year, won 20 out of 22 league games, and collectively scored 82 league goals, a club record which still stands. Hans Håkansson holds the record for most league goals for Malmö FF during a single season; he scored 30 goals in 18 matches during the 1935–36 season in the second-tier. Excluding second-tier seasons, however, the record belongs to Bo Larsson, whose tally of 28 goals in 22 games during 1965 remains unmatched today.

== History ==
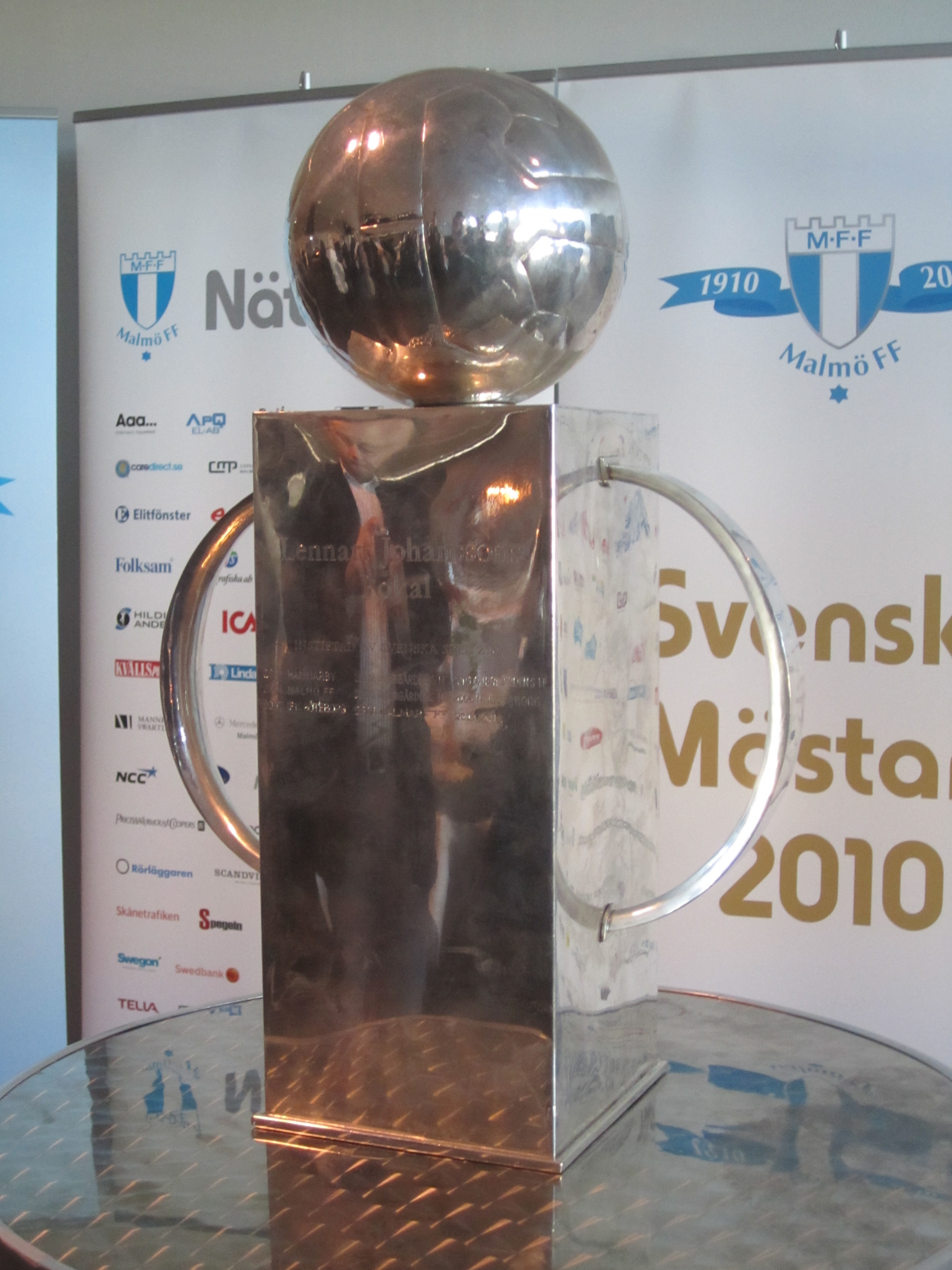
Lennart Johanssons Pokal, the current trophy awarded to the Swedish football champions, here seen in 2010 in Malmö FF's ownership after winning Allsvenskan the same year

When Malmö FF was founded in 1910, there was no established official league system in Swedish football. The club therefore competed in two cup competitions: the nationally organised Svenska Mästerskapet, and Distriktsmästerskapet, the regional championship of Scania. The team's best performances during these early years were when they reached the Svenska Mästerskapet quarter-finals in 1920, and the Distriktsmästerskapet final twice, in 1916 and 1918. The club would go on to win Distriktsmästerskapet 27 times before the competition was abolished in 1966.

The Swedish Football Association introduced an official league system in 1920, and placed Malmö FF in a regional section of the second tier, Division 2 Sydsvenska Serien. Malmö FF won the league in its first season, and were promoted to Division 1 Svenska Serien Västra, one of the first-tier divisions. However, they were relegated back to Division 2 Sydsvenska Serien after a single season. Achieving mid-table positions in this league, Malmö FF stayed in the second tier after it was renamed Division 2 Södra for the 1928–29 season. The club won Division 2 Södra at the end of the 1930–31 season and were promoted to Allsvenskan for the first time since the new national first-tier league had been established before the 1924–25 season. Malmö FF remained in Allsvenskan until 1934, when the club was found to have paid players in spite of the league's then-mandatory amateurism, which remained in place until 1967. For this, they were demoted to Division 2 Södra; several players and members of staff were banned. Malmö FF won the Division 2 Södra title at the first attempt, but failed to win the play-offs which decided promotion back to Allsvenskan. They retained the title the following year, 1936, and this time won the promotion play-offs.

Over the following decade, Malmö FF established themselves as a permanent fixture in Allsvenskan. The side had a period of great success in the late 1940s and early 1950s, when they finished within the top three in Allsvenskan for ten consecutive seasons, securing five league titles. The club also won the main Swedish cup tournament, Svenska Cupen (established in 1941), five times during the same period. The club continued to finish in the upper half of the league table and experienced additional periods of success during the late 1960s and the 1970s. Malmö FF also qualified for European competition arranged by The Union of European Football Associations (UEFA), doing so for the first time during the 1964–65 season when they entered the European Cup (qualifying as Allsvenskan leaders during the European summer, as Sweden had switched to a season format based around the calendar year). The club qualified for continental competitions 12 consecutive seasons (1971 and 1982).

During the 1980s and 1990s, the Swedish FA experimented with the competition format: between 1982 and 1990, the Swedish championship was given to the winners of a play-off held between the four best-placed Allsvenskan teams. A championship league was contested by the top six clubs in the league in 1991 and 1992. The pre-1982 format was then restored.^{[A]} Malmö FF won Allsvenskan a record five consecutive seasons (1985 and 1989), but only won the play-offs in 1986 and 1988. After a brief successful period in the mid-1990s, the club began to decline in Allsvenskan and found themselves relegated in 1999, the first time since 1936 they were out of the top division. The team were relegated to the newly created Superettan.

Malmö FF won promotion back to Allsvenskan after only one season in Superettan, and once again established themselves as a successful top-level club during the first decade of the 21st century. After a meagre season in 2001, they finished in the top three for three successive seasons between 2002 and 2004, and won their first Allsvenskan title since 1989 in 2004. Malmö FF then became a mid-table team as they finished between the fifth and ninth positions during the latter part of the decade, before they won the league once more in 2010, the club's centenary year. This earned the club qualification into Svenska Supercupen, an annual Super Cup match inaugurated in 2007 in which the Allsvenskan champions face the winners of Svenska Cupen. Malmö FF lost the 2011 edition 2–1 to regional rivals Helsingborgs IF. Following the 2010 championship winning year Malmö FF won bronze and small silver medals before winning the gold medal once more in 2013. After this they won Svenska Supercupen for the first time with a win against rivals IFK Göteborg. This was the first time since the 1989 season that the club won two official titles in the same season. In 2014 Malmö FF defended the league title for the first time since 1989 and the Swedish championship for the first time since 1975. In the same season Malmö FF also became the first Swedish club to play in the group stage of the UEFA Champions League in fourteen years.

== Key ==
Key to competitions

- Allsvenskan (AS) – Sweden's top football league, established in 1924
- Superettan (SE) – The second tier of Swedish football, held since 2000
- Division 1 (D1) – The third tier of Swedish football as of 2016. Was the unofficial first tier named Svenska Serien when Malmö FF contested Division 1 Svenska Serien Västra (a regional division) during the 1922–23 season.
- Division 2 (D2) – The fourth tier of Swedish football as of 2016. Was the second tier when Malmö FF played in various regional divisions of the league in the 1920s and 1930s.
- Svenska Mästerskapet – a cup held between 1896 and 1925 to decide the Swedish football champions
- Svenska Cupen (SC) – Sweden's national cup, first contested in 1941. Was not held between 1954 and 1966, or in 1992.
- Svenska Supercupen (SSC) – Sweden's super cup, organised between 2007 and 2015. It was an annual one-off match between the respective winners of Allsvenskan and Svenska Cupen.
- Allsvenskan play-offs (CPO) – the play-off format which decided the Swedish football champions between 1982 and 1990. Were contested by the four best-placed clubs in Allsvenskan each year.
- Mästerskapsserien (MS) – a short-lived league, held in 1991 and 1992, in which the top six teams of the year's Allsvenskan league season would compete for the Swedish football championship

Key to colours and symbols

1st or W	Winners
2nd or RU	Runners-up
↑	Promoted
↓	Relegated
♦	Top scorer in Allsvenskan

Allsvenskan specifics^{[B]}

1st	Gold medallists
2nd	Big silver medallists
3rd	Small silver medallists
4th	Bronze medallists

Key to league record

- Season = The year and article of the season
- Pos = Final position
- Pld = Games played
- W = Games won
- D = Games drawn
- L = Games lost
- GF = Goals scored
- GA = Goals against
- Pts = Points
- Att = Average attendance

Key to European competitions

- EC = European Cup
- CL = UEFA Champions League
- ICFC = Inter-Cities Fairs Cup
- CWC = UEFA Cup Winners' Cup
- UC = UEFA Cup
- ICC = Intercontinental Cup
- UIC = UEFA Intertoto Cup
- EL = UEFA Europa League

Key to cup record

- n/a (not applicable) = Indicates that Malmö FF did not participate in cup play because there was no competition for this year
- En-dash (–) = An en-dash indicates that Malmö FF did not participate in cup play because the club failed to qualify
- DNE = The club did not enter cup play
- PPO = Promotional play-offs
- QR = Qualification round
- QR1 = First qualification round
- QR2 = Second qualification round
- QR3 = Third qualification round
- PO = Play-off round
- GS = Group stage
- LS = League stage
- R1 = First round
- R2 = Second round
- R3 = Third round
- R4 = Fourth round
- R5 = Fifth round
- R6 = Sixth round
- R32 = Round of 32
- R16 = Round of 16
- QF = Quarter-finals
- SF = Semi-finals
- RU = Runners-up
- W = Winners

== Seasons ==
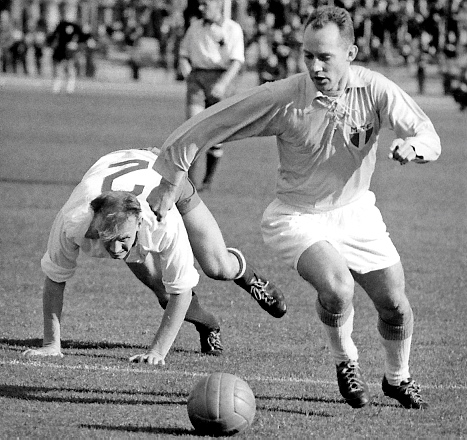
Malmö FF's Bertil Nilsson (right), pictured in 1959

=== 1910–1919 ===
Season	Svenska Mästerskapet	Distriktsmästerskapet
1910	–^{[C]}	–
1911–12	DNE	SF
1912–13	DNE	SF
1913–14	DNE	SF
1914–15	DNE	SF
1915–16	DNE	QF
1916–17^{[D]}	DNE	RU
1916–17^{[D]}	2QR	SF
1918	QR	RU
1919	2QR	QF

=== Since 1920 ===
Season	League										Cup and Play-offs	UEFA Competitions^{[E]}		League top goalscorer		Ref
Season	Div	Pld	W	D	L	GF	GA	Pts	Pos	Att	Cup and Play-offs	EC/CL	Other	Name	Goals	Ref
1920–21	D2	10	7	1	2	31	20	15	1st ↑	968	n/a	n/a	n/a	Johan Andersson	12	
1921–22	–^{[F]}	–	–	–	–	–	–	–	–	—	n/a	n/a	n/a	–	–	
1922–23	D1	10	1	2	7	6	19	4	6th ↓	1,471	n/a	n/a	n/a	Gudmundsson	3	
1923–24	D2	10	6	3	1	20	7	15	2nd	553	n/a	n/a	n/a	Lindblad	8	
1924–25	D2	14	6	3	5	35	32	15	5th	718	n/a	n/a	n/a	Öhrn	7	
1925–26	D2	16	5	8	3	44	24	18	3rd	909	n/a	n/a	n/a	Rosén; Svensson	7	
1926–27	D2	18	7	4	7	30	31	18	6th	1,414	n/a	n/a	n/a	Svensson	10	
1927–28	D2	20	11	4	5	42	41	26	3rd	2,124	n/a	n/a	n/a	Roslund; Håkansson	14	
1928–29	D2	18	8	2	8	63	44	18	4th	2,239	n/a	n/a	n/a	Håkansson	10	
1929–30	D2	18	9	2	7	47	34	20	2nd	2,727	n/a	n/a	n/a	Håkansson	21	
1930–31	D2	18	11	3	4	50	2	25	1st ↑	2,222	n/a	n/a	n/a	Håkansson	13	
1931–32	AS	22	6	4	12	48	68	16	9th	6,881	n/a	n/a	n/a	Håkansson	18	
1932–33	AS	22	8	3	11	42	66	19	9th	7,683	n/a	n/a	n/a	Håkansson	15	
1933–34	AS	13	5	0	8	27	38	0	– ↓^{[G]}	7,212	n/a	n/a	n/a	Håkansson	8	
1934–35	D2	18	13	5	0	66	21	31	1st	5,570	PPO – RU	n/a	n/a	Håkansson	24	
1935–36	D2	18	14	2	2	61	17	30	1st ↑	5,809	PPO – W	n/a	n/a	Håkansson	30	
1936–37	AS	22	9	3	10	39	45	21	6th	8,615	n/a	n/a	n/a	Håkansson	15	
1937–38	AS	22	6	8	8	20	30	20	9th	9,764	n/a	n/a	n/a	John Andersson	5	
1938–39	AS	22	9	7	6	30	29	25	3rd	9,008	n/a	n/a	n/a	O. Andersson	16 ♦	
1939–40	AS	22	4	10	8	25	28	18	10th	5,998	n/a	n/a	n/a	Sandberg; A. Nilsson; Ericsson	4	
1940–41	AS	22	7	8	7	33	33	22	8th	7,844	SC – R2	n/a	n/a	Martinsson	8	
1941–42	AS	22	9	7	6	37	33	25	5th	8,753	SC – R2	n/a	n/a	Martinsson	7	
1942–43	AS	22	10	5	7	44	30	25	5th	8,218	SC – QF	n/a	n/a	B. Tapper	10	
1943–44	AS	22	17	3	2	54	22	37	1st	11,362	SC – W	n/a	n/a	B. Tapper; S. Nilsson	11	
1944–45	AS	22	12	4	6	58	31	28	3rd	11,226	SC – RU	n/a	n/a	Jönsson	13	
1945–46	AS	22	13	4	5	48	27	30	2nd	11,869	SC – W	n/a	n/a	G. Nilsson	14	
1946–47	AS	22	10	8	4	51	30	28	3rd	12,733	SC – W	n/a	n/a	Jönsson	10	
1947–48	AS	22	12	5	5	60	33	29	2nd	15,136	DNE^{[H]}	n/a	n/a	Jönsson	14	
1948–49	AS	22	12	5	5	72	29	29	1st	16,308	SC – QF	n/a	n/a	B. Tapper	18	
1949–50	AS	22	20	2	0	82	21	42	1st	17,290	SC – QF	n/a	n/a	Rydell	21 ♦	
1950–51	AS	22	16	5	1	52	22	37	1st	17,048	SC – W	n/a	n/a	Jönsson	14	
1951–52	AS	22	15	2	5	50	17	32	2nd	14,334	n/a	n/a	n/a	Rydell	13	
1952–53	AS	22	14	3	5	60	32	31	1st	14,002	SC – W	n/a	n/a	Sandell	22	
1953–54	AS	22	8	6	8	33	30	22	7th	16,361	n/a	n/a	n/a	Sandell	12	
1954–55	AS	22	8	5	9	33	33	21	8th	15,020	n/a	n/a	n/a	Öberg	9	
1955–56	AS	22	14	4	4	60	26	32	2nd	16,531	n/a	–	–	Sandell	20	
1956–57	AS	22	11	6	5	50	30	28	2nd	15,540	n/a	–	–	Gustafsson	18	
1957–58	AS	33	16	8	9	62	49	40	4th	12,330	n/a	–	–	Gustafsson	16	
1959	AS	22	12	4	6	50	29	28	5th	15,170	n/a	–	–	B. Nilsson; Svahn; Ekström	9	
1960	AS	22	9	4	9	33	33	22	4th	10,381	n/a	–	–	Svahn	8	
1961	AS	22	10	4	8	31	34	24	5th	10,541	n/a	–	–	Svahn	8	
1962	AS	22	9	4	9	32	40	22	8th	9,663	n/a	–	–	R. Eriksson	10	
1963	AS	22	11	5	6	43	31	27	4th	10,104	n/a	–	–	B. Larsson	17 ♦	
1964	AS	22	13	5	4	45	20	31	2nd	15,284	n/a	QR	–	B. Larsson	11	
1965	AS	22	15	4	3	64	24	34	1st	13,963	n/a	–	ICFC – R1	B. Larsson	28 ♦	
1966	AS	22	6	7	9	32	34	19	9th	10,340	n/a	R1	–	B. Larsson	7	
1967	AS	22	14	5	3	53	21	33	1st	13,992	SC – W	–	ICFC – R1	Szepanski	22 ♦	
1968	AS	22	11	5	6	42	27	27	2nd	15,521	SC – QF	R1	–	S. Tapper	9	
1969	AS	22	11	6	5	34	27	28	2nd	12,776	SC – R5	–	ICFC – R1	S. Tapper	12	
1970	AS	22	11	7	4	30	20	29	1st	13,036	SC – RU	–	ICFC – R1	B. Larsson	16 ♦	
1971	AS	22	12	6	4	46	26	22	1st	16,375	SC – R4	R1	–	B. Larsson	13	
1972	AS	22	9	5	8	27	26	23	6th	10,668	SC – W	R1	–	S. Tapper; C. Andersson	6	
1973	AS	26	12	6	8	46	32	30	4th	9,970	SC – W	–	CWC – R2	C. Andersson	12	
1974	AS	26	19	5	2	48	15	43	1st	10,412	SC – W	–	CWC – QF	Sjöberg	14	
1975	AS	26	18	6	2	53	17	42	1st	11,474	SC – SF	R2	–	Cervin	20	
1976	AS	26	12	11	3	37	21	35	2nd	11,192	SC – SF	R1	–	Sjöberg	13	
1977	AS	26	15	8	3	41	19	38	1st	10,875	SC – W	–	UC – R1	Hansson	11	
1978	AS	26	12	8	6	29	15	32	2nd	8,872	SC – R6	RU	–	Sjöberg; T. Andersson	6	
1979	AS	26	12	8	6	30	24	32	4th	7,636	SC – W	–	ICC – RU UC – R2	T. Andersson	5	
1980	AS	26	13	9	4	37	22	35	2nd	8,488	SC – R5	–	CWC – R2	Hansson	10	
1981	AS	26	11	5	10	48	44	27	5th	6,212	SC – QF	–	UC – R2	Sjöberg	13	
1982	AS	22	7	11	4	23	15	25	4th	6,482	SC – R5 CPO – SF	–	–	Sjöberg	7	
1983	AS	22	12	5	5	46	30	29	2nd	9,596	SC – W CPO – SF	–	UC – R1	L. Larsson	12	
1984	AS	22	11	5	6	47	24	27	3rd	7,491	SC – R5 CPO – QF	–	CWC – R1	Magnusson	15	
1985	AS	22	11	8	3	29	14	30	1st	7,829	SC – W CPO – SF	–	UC – R1	Magnusson	7	
1986	AS	22	16	5	1	49	11	37	1st	5,798	SC – SF CPO – W	–	CWC – QF	L. Larsson	12	
1987	AS	22	14	6	2	50	21	34	1st	5,681	SC – SF CPO – RU	R1	–	L. Larsson	20 ♦	
1988	AS	22	15	2	5	45	26	32	1st	5,285	SC – W CPO – W	–	UC – R2	Dahlin	22 ♦	
1989	AS	22	12	7	3	35	11	31	1st	4,621	SC – R6 CPO – RU	R2	–	Engqvist	15	
1990	AS	22	6	10	6	20	15	28^{[I]}	6th	4,513	SC – QF	R2	–	Dahlin	7	
1991	AS MS	18 10	7 3	8 3	3 4	20 9	14 11	29 27	3rd 4th	4,005	SC – R5	–	–	Dahlin	11	
1992	AS MS	18 10	7 3	5 2	6 5	22 11	16 14	26 24	5th 6th	4,824	SC – R3	–	–	P. Andersson; Ohlsson	7	
1993	AS	26	10	5	11	43	38	35	10th	5,855	SC – SF	–	–	Ohlsson; P. Andersson	6	
1994	AS	26	14	7	5	51	33	49	3rd	5,817	SC – R5	–	–	Pettersson	14	
1995	AS	26	9	12	5	32	28	39	4th	5,537	SC – RU	–	UC – R1	Pettersson	15	
1996	AS	26	13	7	6	33	26	46	2nd	5,244	SC – R3	–	UC – R1	Fjellström	6	
1997	AS	26	12	10	4	48	28	46	3rd	6,820	SC – R3	–	UC – QR2	Kindvall	12	
1998	AS	26	9	6	11	35	30	33	9th	7,014	SC – SF	–	UC – QR2	Pavlovic	10	
1999	AS	26	7	4	15	30	48	25	13th ↓	7,620	SC – R2	–	–	Lilienberg	11	
2000	SE	30	20	3	7	48	32	60	2nd ↑	6,153	SC – SF	–	–	Ibrahimović	12	
2001	AS	26	9	5	12	39	46	32	9th	11,315	–	–	–	Ohlsson	7	
2002	AS	26	14	4	8	52	32	46	2nd	13,057	SC – SF	–	–	Ijeh	24 ♦	
2003	AS	26	14	6	6	50	23	48	3rd	18,715	SC – R4	–	UC – R1	Skoog	22 ♦	
2004	AS	26	15	7	4	44	21	52	1st	20,061	SC – R3	–	UIC – R1	Alves	12	
2005	AS	26	12	5	9	38	27	41	5th	15,962	SC – R4	QR3	UC – R1	Alves	14	
2006	AS	26	10	8	8	43	39	38	7th	13,665	SC – R3	–	–	Johansson	11	
2007	AS	26	9	7	10	29	28	34	9th	13,364	SC – R3	–	–	Júnior	9	
2008	AS	30	12	8	10	51	46	44	6th	11,182	SC – R4	–	–	Toivonen	14	
2009	AS	30	11	10	9	40	25	43	7th	14,815	SC – R3	–	–	D. Larsson	11	
2010	AS	30	21	4	5	59	24	67	1st	15,194	SC – R4	–	–	Mehmeti	11	
2011	AS	30	15	9	6	37	30	54	4th	12,388	SC – QF SSC – RU	PO	EL – GS	D. Larsson	6	
2012	AS	30	16	8	6	49	33	56	3rd	14,799	SC – GS	–	–	Ranégie	10	
2013	AS	30	19	6	5	56	30	63	1st	16,039	SC – SF SSC – W	–	EL – QR3	M. Eriksson	11	
2014	AS	30	18	8	4	59	31	62	1st	14,090	SC – QF SSC – W	GS	–	Rosenberg	15	
2015	AS	30	15	9	6	54	34	54	5th	17,332	SC – RU	GS	–	Rosenberg	11	
2016	AS	30	21	3	6	60	26	66	1st	17,841	SC – R2	–	–	Kjartansson	14	
2017	AS	30	19	7	4	63	27	64	1st	18,254	SC – RU	QR2	–	Berget	10	
2018	AS	30	17	7	6	57	29	58	3rd	14,921	SC – GS	QR3	EL – R32	Rosenberg	13	
2019	AS	30	19	8	3	56	16	65	2nd	16,566	SC – RU	–	EL – R32	Rosenberg	13	
2020	AS	30	17	9	4	64	30	60	1st	0	SC – GS	–	EL – PO	Kiese Thelin	14	
2021	AS	30	17	8	5	58	30	59	1st	7,206	SC – W	GS	–	Čolak	14	
2022	AS	30	13	7	10	44	34	46	7th	17,410	SC – QF	QR2	EL – GS	Kiese Thelin	12	
2023	AS	30	20	4	6	62	27	64	1st	20,075	SC – W	–	–	Kiese Thelin	16 ♦	
2024	AS	30	19	8	3	67	25	65	1st	20,273	SC – RU	PO	EL – LS	Kiese Thelin	15	
2025	AS	30	13	10	7	46	33	49	6th	18,662	SC – GS	QR3	EL – LS	Bolin	6	

== Footnotes ==
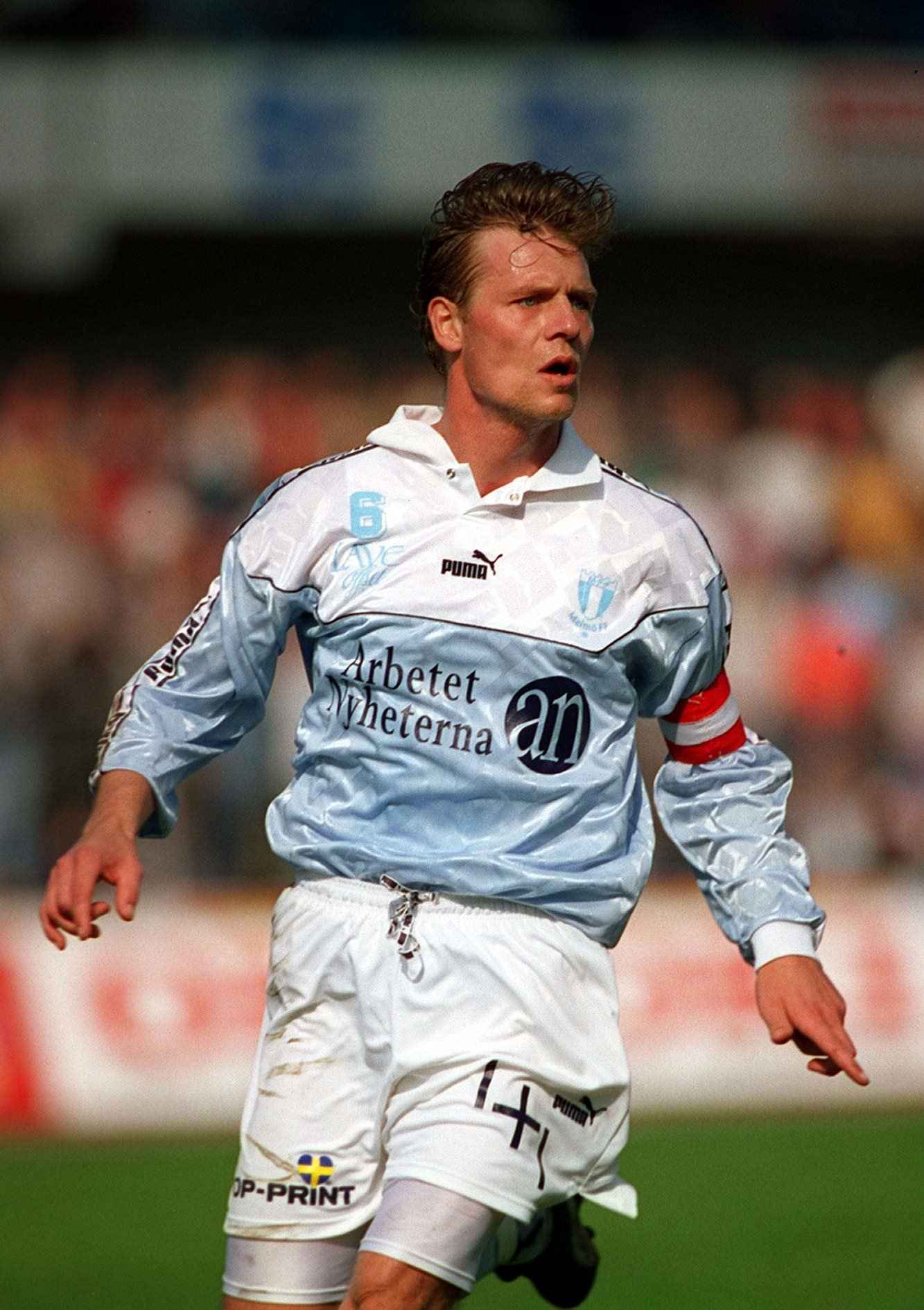
Malmö FF midfielder Niclas Nyhlén, pictured in 1996 as the team's captain

A. The title of "Swedish Champions" has been awarded to the winner of four different competitions over the course of Swedish football history. Between 1896 and 1925 the title was awarded to the winner of Svenska Mästerskapet, a stand-alone cup tournament. No club were given the title between 1926 and 1930, even though a first-tier league, Allsvenskan, was contested. In 1931, the title was reinstated and thereafter awarded to the winners of Allsvenskan. Between 1982 and 1990, a play-off round was held in cup format at the end of the league season to decide the national champions. In 1991, the play-offs were replaced by Mästerskapsserien, an additional league round held following Allsvenskan to decide the title-winners. After two editions, Mästerskapsserien too was abolished. Since the 1993 season, the winners of Allsvenskan have been awarded the national championship.
B. According to Allsvenskan tradition, players and staff of the best four teams, rather than the best three, are awarded medals. The winners are awarded the "gold" medal, the runners-up the "big silver" medal, the team finishing third the "small silver" medal and the team finishing in fourth place the "bronze" medal. The principle of awarding four medals rather than three has its root in the Svenska Mästerskapet of the early 20th century, in which both losing semi-finalists would receive bronze medals as no third-place match would be played. Only Allsvenskan uses this system; this list therefore does not use it to denote league finishes in lower divisions.
C. Malmö FF played no competitive football during the 1910 season.
D. The 1917 Svenska Mästerskapet and 1917 Distriksmästerskapet are part of the 1916–17 season due to the fact that the season format changed to the calendar year format for the 1918 season.
E. Only competitions which are part of UEFA's official European record are included here. The Inter-Cities Fairs Cup, though a non-UEFA competition, is officially recognised as UEFA Cup's precursor, and is therefore also incorporated into this list. The 1979 Intercontinental Cup co-hosted by UEFA and CONMEBOL is also included in this list.
F. Malmö FF played no competitive football during the 1921–22 season.
G. Malmö FF were disqualified from the competition and demoted a division as punishment for paying players in spite of Swedish Football Association rules prohibiting professionalism among its member clubs. Professional players were first allowed by the Swedish Football Association in 1967.
H. All Allsvenskan clubs decided not to enter the 1948 Svenska Cupen due to several key players participating in the football tournament at the 1948 Summer Olympics in London. Sweden won the gold medal after defeating Yugoslavia in the final.
I. The 1990 season saw the introduction of three points for a win.

== See also ==
- The Invincibles (football)
