= 1931–32 Malmö FF season =

Malmö FF
1931-32 season
- Chairman: (Sweden) Fritz Landgren
- Stadium: Malmö IP
- Allsvenskan: 9th
- Top goalscorer: Hans Håkansson (18)
Home colours

The 1931–32 season was the first time Malmö FF competed in Allsvenskan. The club finished in ninth place and thus ensured another season in Sweden's top tier.

== Players ==
=== Squad ===
No.	Pos	Nat	Player	Total		Allsvenskan	
No.	Pos	Nat	Player	Apps	Goals	Apps	Goals
		(Sweden) SWE	Algot Christoffersson	22	0	22	0
		(Sweden) SWE	Hans Håkansson	22	18	22	18
		(Sweden) SWE	Andreas Nilsson	21	6	21	6
		(Sweden) SWE	Valdemar Wiberg	21	0	21	0
		(Sweden) SWE	Ivar Roslund	21	4	21	4
		(Sweden) SWE	Erik Svensson	20	5	20	5
		(Sweden) SWE	Göte Dahl	18	10	18	10
		(Sweden) SWE	Henry Dahl	17	0	17	0
		(Sweden) SWE	Gunnar Martinsson	16	0	16	0
		(Sweden) SWE	Erik Eckard	16	0	16	0
		(Sweden) SWE	Carl Ahlberg	13	1	13	1
		(Sweden) SWE	Sven Nilsson	11	0	11	0
		(Sweden) SWE	Helge Zachrisson	6	1	6	1
		(Sweden) SWE	Ove Blomberg	5	0	5	0
		(Sweden) SWE	Tore Linnander	3	0	3	0
		(Sweden) SWE	Ture Isberg	3	1	3	1
		(Sweden) SWE	Viking Stjärnfeldt	3	0	3	0
		(Sweden) SWE	Gösta Nilsson	2	0	2	0
		(Sweden) SWE	Alex Lindén	1	0	1	0
		(Sweden) SWE	Valter Ryberg	1	0	1	0

== Competitions ==
=== Allsvenskan ===
==== League table ====
Pos	Team	Pld	W	D	L	GF	GA	GD	Pts	Qualification or relegation
7	IF Elfsborg	22	8	6	8	38	35	+3	22	
8	Hälsingborgs IF	22	9	3	10	45	44	+1	21	
9	Malmö FF	22	6	4	12	48	68	−20	16	
10	Landskrona BoIS	22	4	8	10	35	58	−23	16	
11	IFK Malmö (R)	22	4	6	12	32	55	−23	14	Relegation to Division 2

Rules for classification: 1) points; 2) goal difference; 3) number of goals scored.
(R) Relegated

==== Matches ====
2 August 1931 Round 1	Malmö FF	0 – 1	IFK Göteborg	Malmö
				Stadium: Malmö IP

9 August 1931 Round 2	Malmö FF	2 – 4	AIK	Malmö
				Stadium: Malmö IP

12 August 1931 Round 21	Malmö FF	6 – 1	Landskrona BoIS	Malmö
				Stadium: Malmö IP

16 August 1931 Round 3	Hallstahammars SK	4 – 0	Malmö FF	Hallstahammar
				Stadium: Trollebo IP

23 August 1931 Round 4	IFK Malmö	1 – 2	Malmö FF	Malmö
				Stadium: Malmö IP

30 August 1931 Round 5	Örgryte IS	1 – 2	Malmö FF	Gothenburg
				Stadium: Slottsskogsvallen

13 September 1931 Round 7	Malmö FF	2 – 3	IFK Eskilstuna	Malmö
				Stadium: Malmö IP

20 September 1931 Round 8	Helsingborgs IF	5 – 2	Malmö FF	Helsingborg
				Stadium: Olympia

4 October 1931 Round 9	Malmö FF	3 – 3	GAIS	Malmö
				Stadium: Malmö IP

11 October 1931 Round 10	Landskrona BoIS	4 – 0	Malmö FF	Landskrona
				Stadium: Landskrona IP

18 October 1931 Round 11	Malmö FF	2 – 0	IF Elfsborg	Malmö
				Stadium: Malmö IP

25 October 1931 Round 12	IF Elfsborg	3 – 3	Malmö FF	Borås
				Stadium: Borås Idrottsplats

1 November 1931 Round 13	Malmö FF	4 – 5	Örgryte IS	Malmö
				Stadium: Malmö IP

10 April 1932 Round 17	Malmö FF	3 – 5	Helsingborgs IF	Malmö
				Stadium: Malmö IP

17 April 1932 Round 15	GAIS	3 – 0	Malmö FF	Gothenburg
				Stadium: Slottsskogsvallen

24 April 1932 Round 16	Malmö FF	2 – 4	IK Sleipner	Malmö
				Stadium: Malmö IP

1 May 1932 Round 6	IFK Göteborg	6 – 1	Malmö FF	Gothenburg
				Stadium: Gamla Ullevi

5 May 1932 Round 18	IFK Eskilstuna	3 – 3	Malmö FF	Eskilstuna
				Stadium: Tunavallen

8 May 1932 Round 19	IK Sleipner	3 – 0	Malmö FF	Norrköping
				Stadium: Idrottsparken

13 May 1932 Round 20	Malmö FF	3 – 2	IFK Malmö	Malmö
				Stadium: Malmö IP

29 May 1932 Round 14	AIK	5 – 5	Malmö FF	Stockholm
				Stadium: Stockholms Stadion

5 June 1932 Round 22	Malmö FF	3 – 2	Hallstahammars SK	Malmö
				Stadium: Malmö IP
