= 1937–38 Division 2 (Swedish football) =

Swedish League Division 2
- Season: 1937–38
- Champions: Hammarby IF; Hallstahammars SK; Degerfors IF; Malmö BI
- Promoted: Hallstahammars SK; Degerfors IF
- Relegated: Sundbybergs IK; Skutskärs IF; BK Derby; Katrineholms AIK; Alingsås IF; Karlstads BIK; IFK Kristianstad; IFK Hälsingborg

Statistics of Swedish football Division 2 for the 1937–38 season.

== League standings ==
=== Division 2 Norra 1937–38 ===
Teams from a large part of northern Sweden, approximately above the province of Medelpad, were not allowed to play in the national league system until the 1953–54 season, and a championship was instead played to decide the best team in Norrland.

Pos	Team	Pld	W	D	L	GF	GA	GD	Pts	Qualification or relegation
1	Hammarby IF	18	11	4	3	44	19	+25	26	Playoffs for promotion to Allsvenskan
2	Djurgårdens IF	18	8	6	4	34	26	+8	22	
3	Värtans IK	18	8	5	5	27	21	+6	21	
4	Gefle IF	18	8	4	6	31	31	0	20 (Note: Tie breaker is goal average.)	
5	Ljusne AIK	18	8	4	6	30	35	−5	20	
6	Reymersholms IK	18	5	6	7	35	33	+2	16	
7	IFK Grängesberg	18	6	3	9	38	39	−1	15	
8	Bollnäs GIF	18	5	5	8	23	29	−6	15	
9	Sundbybergs IK	18	5	4	9	25	37	−12	14	Relegated to Division 3
10	Skutskärs IF	18	3	5	10	21	38	−17	11	Relegated to Division 3

=== Division 2 Östra 1937–38 ===
Pos	Team	Pld	W	D	L	GF	GA	GD	Pts	Qualification or relegation
1	Hallstahammars SK	18	13	0	5	41	19	+22	26	Playoffs for promotion to Allsvenskan
2	IFK Norrköping	18	8	4	6	43	31	+12	20 (Note: Tie breaker is goal average.)	
3	Skärblacka IF	18	9	2	7	37	35	+2	20	
4	Surahammars IF	18	8	3	7	32	30	+2	19	
5	IFK Västerås	18	7	4	7	34	22	+12	18	
6	Mjölby AI	18	8	2	8	28	30	−2	18	
7	Motala AIF	18	7	4	7	35	39	−4	18	
8	IFK Eskilstuna	18	5	6	7	41	43	−2	16	
9	BK Derby	18	5	4	9	27	36	−9	14	Relegated to Division 3
10	Katrineholms AIK	18	4	3	11	20	53	−33	11	Relegated to Division 3

=== Division 2 Västra 1937–38 ===
Pos	Team	Pld	W	D	L	GF	GA	GD	Pts	Qualification or relegation
1	Degerfors IF	18	14	3	1	53	15	+38	31	Playoffs for promotion to Allsvenskan
2	Karlskoga IF	18	12	1	5	43	23	+20	25	
3	IK Tord	18	11	1	6	40	25	+15	23 (Note: Tie breaker is goal average.)	League transfer within league level
4	Billingsfors IK	18	11	1	6	35	26	+9	23	
5	Fässbergs IF	18	8	3	7	39	45	−6	19	
6	Arvika BK	18	8	1	9	30	37	−7	17	
7	Tidaholms GIF	18	6	3	9	34	37	−3	15	
8	Jonsereds IF	18	4	5	9	27	31	−4	13	
9	Alingsås IF	18	3	4	11	20	42	−22	10	Relegated to Division 3
10	Karlstads BIK	18	2	0	16	17	57	−40	4	Relegated to Division 3

=== Division 2 Södra 1937–38 ===
Pos	Team	Pld	W	D	L	GF	GA	GD	Pts	Qualification or relegation
1	Malmö BI	18	12	4	2	49	27	+22	28	Playoffs for promotion to Allsvenskan
2	IFK Trelleborg	18	10	3	5	40	32	+8	23	
3	BK Landora	18	10	2	6	43	23	+20	22	
4	Höganäs BK	18	9	2	7	38	31	+7	20 (Note: Tie breaker is goal average.)	
5	Varbergs BoIS	18	10	0	8	46	42	+4	20	League transfer within league level
6	Halmstads BK	18	8	3	7	43	31	+12	19	
7	IFK Värnamo	18	7	5	6	40	32	+8	19	
8	IS Halmia	18	8	3	7	33	31	+2	19	
9	IFK Kristianstad	18	4	2	12	33	57	−24	10	Relegated to Division 3
10	IFK Helsingborg	18	0	0	18	18	77	−59	0	Relegated to Division 3
