= Patrick Andersson =

Patrick Andersson may refer to:

- Patrik Andersson (born 1971), Swedish former football defender
- Patrick Andersson (footballer, born 1970), Swedish former football midfielder
