= 1969 Division 2 (Swedish football) =

Swedish League Division 2
- Season: 1969
- Champions: Sandåkerns SK; Hammarby IF; Örgryte IS; Hälsingborgs IF
- Promoted: Örgryte IS; Hammarby IF
- Relegated: Gimonäs CK; Gefle IF; Gällivare SK; Sundbybergs IK; Råsunda IS; IFK Västerås; Skogens IF; Karlstads BK; Kinna IF; IK Atleten; Blomstermåla IK; Sölvesborgs GIF

Statistics of Swedish football Division 2 for the 1969 season.

== League standings ==
=== Norrland ===
Pos	Team	Pld	W	D	L	GF	GA	GD	Pts	Qualification or relegation
1	Sandåkerns SK	22	14	3	5	36	20	+16	31	Playoffs for promotion to Allsvenskan
2	Brynäs IF	22	12	6	4	50	23	+27	30	
3	Domsjö IF	22	10	4	8	33	29	+4	24	
4	IFK Holmsund	22	9	6	7	34	23	+11	24	
5	GIF Sundsvall	22	9	5	8	39	30	+9	23	
6	IFK Luleå	22	8	7	7	25	21	+4	23	
7	Ljusdals IF	22	7	7	8	31	29	+2	21	
8	IFK Härnösand	22	6	6	10	23	30	−7	18	
9	Skellefteå AIK	22	7	4	11	19	36	−17	18	
10	Gimonäs CK	22	5	8	9	25	44	−19	18	Relegation to Division 3
11	Gefle IF	22	6	5	11	24	37	−13	17	Relegation to Division 3
12	Gällivare SK	22	6	5	11	20	37	−17	17	Relegation to Division 3

=== Svealand ===
Pos	Team	Pld	W	D	L	GF	GA	GD	Pts	Qualification or relegation
1	Hammarby IF	22	17	2	3	55	17	+38	36	Playoffs for promotion to Allsvenskan
2	Degerfors IF	22	14	3	5	60	26	+34	31	
3	IFK Eskilstuna	22	12	4	6	42	20	+22	28	
4	IK Brage	22	11	2	9	29	36	−7	24	
5	Sandvikens IF	22	10	2	10	33	39	−6	22	
6	IFK Stockholm	22	8	5	9	25	31	−6	21	
7	Malungs IF	22	8	4	10	29	32	−3	20	
8	Älvsjö AIK	22	6	8	8	20	26	−6	20	
9	Södertälje SK	22	7	5	10	26	32	−6	19	
10	Sundbybergs IK	22	8	3	11	28	35	−7	19	Relegation to Division 3
11	Råsunda IS	22	4	9	9	23	38	−15	17	Relegation to Division 3
12	IFK Västerås	22	1	5	16	17	55	−38	7	Relegation to Division 3

=== Norra Götaland ===
Pos	Team	Pld	W	D	L	GF	GA	GD	Pts	Qualification or relegation
1	Örgryte IS	22	15	5	2	59	28	+31	35	Playoffs for promotion to Allsvenskan
2	Skövde AIK	22	11	6	5	47	33	+14	28	
3	IF Saab	22	11	6	5	39	31	+8	28	
4	Västra Frölunda IF	22	11	2	9	37	34	+3	24	
5	IK Sleipner	22	8	6	8	25	23	+2	22	
6	Tidaholms GIF	22	8	4	10	35	38	−3	20	
7	Grimsås IF	22	9	2	11	30	36	−6	20	
8	IFK Arvika	22	7	6	9	23	29	−6	20	
9	IFK Värnamo	22	7	6	9	24	31	−7	20	
10	Skogens IF	22	6	5	11	32	45	−13	17	Relegation to Division 3
11	Karlstads BK	22	5	5	12	35	39	−4	15	Relegation to Division 3
12	Kinna IF	22	5	5	12	27	46	−19	15	Relegation to Division 3

=== Södra Götaland ===
Pos	Team	Pld	W	D	L	GF	GA	GD	Pts	Qualification or relegation
1	Hälsingborgs IF	22	13	5	4	42	25	+17	31	Playoffs for promotion to Allsvenskan
2	IFK Malmö	22	13	4	5	50	23	+27	30	
3	Kalmar FF	22	11	5	6	46	36	+10	27	
4	Halmstads BK	22	10	5	7	46	34	+12	25	
5	IS Halmia	22	9	6	7	29	28	+1	24	
6	IFK Trelleborg	22	9	6	7	21	23	−2	24	
7	Landskrona BoIS	22	9	4	9	33	35	−2	22	
8	Hässleholms IF	22	8	4	10	38	34	+4	20	
9	IFÖ/Bromölla IF	22	6	6	10	26	27	−1	18	
10	IK Atleten	22	5	8	9	19	36	−17	18	Relegation to Division 3
11	Blomstermåla IK	22	4	5	13	20	44	−24	13	Relegation to Division 3
12	Sölvesborgs GIF	22	3	6	13	24	49	−25	12	Relegation to Division 3

== Allsvenskan promotion playoffs ==
- Sandåkerns SK - Hammarby IF 1-2
- Hälsingborgs IF - Örgryte IS 0-4
- Hammarby IF - Hälsingborgs IF 2-0
- Örgryte IS - Sandåkerns SK 3-1

Pos	Team	Pld	W	D	L	GF	GA	GD	Pts	Promotion
1	Örgryte IS	2	2	0	0	7	1	+6	4	Promotion to Allsvenskan
2	Hammarby IF	2	2	0	0	4	1	+3	4	Promotion to Allsvenskan
3	Sandåkerns SK	2	0	0	2	2	5	−3	0	
4	Hälsingborgs IF	2	0	0	2	0	6	−6	0	
