= 1920–21 Malmö FF season =

Malmö FF
1920-21 season
- Chairman: Janne Johansson
- Stadium: Malmö IP
- Division 2 Sydsvenska Serien: 1st
- Top goalscorer: Johan Andersson (12)
Home colours

The 1920–21 season was the first time Malmö FF competed in a national division. The Swedish Football Association arranged for the best clubs in the country to play in national divisions, before 1920 only certain clubs, mostly clubs from Stockholm and Gothenburg had been able to play for the Swedish football championship which was decided by a cup form competition until the introduction of Allsvenskan in 1924. The 1920–21 season was also significant in the way that it was also Malmö FF's first season with the now iconic sky-blue match kit. The club competed in Division 2 Sydsvenska Serien, finishing first and gaining promotion to Division 1 Svenska Serien Västra for the 1922–23 season.

== Players ==
=== Squad stats ===
| No. | Pos | Nat | Player | Total | | Div 2 Sydsvenska Serien | |
| No. | Pos | Nat | Player | Apps | Goals | Apps | Goals |
|---|---|---|---|---|---|---|---|
| | | (Sweden) SWE | Axel Håkansson | 10 | 0 | 10 | 0 |
| | | (Sweden) SWE | Ebbe Löfgren | 10 | 0 | 10 | 0 |
| | | (Sweden) SWE | Johan Sjöberg | 10 | 0 | 10 | 0 |
| | | (Sweden) SWE | Carl Andersson | 10 | 0 | 10 | 0 |
| | | (Sweden) SWE | Hilding Andersson | 9 | 2 | 9 | 2 |
| | | (Sweden) SWE | Johan Andersson | 9 | 12 | 9 | 12 |
| | | (Sweden) SWE | Wilhelm Nilsson | 9 | 0 | 9 | 0 |
| | | (Sweden) SWE | Olof Ringdahl | 9 | 5 | 9 | 5 |
| | | (Sweden) SWE | John Torstensson | 8 | 0 | 8 | 0 |
| | | (Sweden) SWE | Fredrik Lindblad | 8 | 9 | 8 | 9 |
| | | (Sweden) SWE | Gösta Nilsson | 7 | 1 | 7 | 1 |
| | | (Sweden) SWE | Carl Florin | 4 | 0 | 4 | 0 |
| | | (Sweden) SWE | Hilder Svensson | 4 | 1 | 4 | 1 |
| | | (Sweden) SWE | Otto Nyberg | 1 | 0 | 1 | 0 |
| | | (Sweden) SWE | Harald Olsson | 1 | 0 | 1 | 0 |
| | | (Sweden) SWE | Helge Burén | 1 | 0 | 1 | 0 |

== Club ==
=== Other information ===
| Chairman | (Sweden) Janne Johansson |
| Ground (capacity and dimensions) | Malmö IP ( / ) |

Updated to match played 17 October
Source: Malmö FF and Malmö IP

== Competitions ==
=== Overall ===
| Competition | Started round | Current position / round | Final position / round | First match | Last match |
|---|---|---|---|---|---|
| Division 2 Sydsvenska Serien | — | — | Winner | 2 May 1920 | 1 June 1921 |
| Svenska Mästerskapet | Second Qualifying Round | — | Third Qualifying Round | 5 June 1921 | 10 August 1921 |

Updated to match played 17 October
Source: Competitions

=== Division 2 Sydsvenska Serien ===
==== League table ====
| Pos | Team | Pld | W | D | L | GF | GA | GD | Pts | Promotion |
|---|---|---|---|---|---|---|---|---|---|---|
| 1 | Malmö FF (C, P) | 10 | 7 | 1 | 2 | 31 | 20 | +11 | 15 | Promotion to Division 1 Svenska Serien Västra |
| 2 | Landskrona BoIS | 10 | 6 | 1 | 3 | 28 | 19 | +9 | 13 | |
| 3 | IS Halmia | 10 | 4 | 1 | 5 | 19 | 21 | −2 | 9 | |
| 4 | Jönköpings IS | 10 | 4 | 0 | 6 | 18 | 28 | −10 | 8 | |
| 5 | Husqvarna IF | 10 | 4 | 0 | 6 | 18 | 29 | −11 | 8 | |

Rules for classification: 1) points; 2) goal difference; 3) number of goals scored.
(C) Champions; (P) Promoted

==== Results summary ====
| Overall | | | | | | | | Home | | | | | | Away | | | | | |
| Pld | W | D | L | GF | GA | GD | Pts | W | D | L | GF | GA | GD | W | D | L | GF | GA | GD |
|---|---|---|---|---|---|---|---|---|---|---|---|---|---|---|---|---|---|---|---|
| 10 | 7 | 1 | 2 | 31 | 20 | +11 | 15 | 5 | 0 | 0 | 17 | 6 | +11 | 2 | 1 | 2 | 14 | 14 | 0 |

Last updated: 17 October.

==== Results by round ====
| Round | 1 | 2 | 3 | 4 | 5 | 6 | 7 | 8 | 9 | 10 |
|---|---|---|---|---|---|---|---|---|---|---|
| Ground | H | A | A | H | H | A | H | A | A | H |
| Result | W | L | W | W | W | D | W | L | W | W |

A = Away; H = Home; W = Win; D = Draw; L = Loss

==== Matches ====
| 2 May 1920 Round 1 | Malmö FF | 3 – 0 | IS Halmia | Malmö IP, Malmö |
| | Lindblad, J.Andersson | | | Attendance: 1,277 |

| 13 May 1920 Round 2 | IFK Hälsingborg | 4 – 1 | Malmö FF | Hälsingborg |
| | | | J.Andersson |

| 18 May 1920 Round 3 | Landskrona BoIS | 1 – 5 | Malmö FF | Landskrona |
| | | | Lindblad,, Ringdahl, |

| 6 June 1920 Round 4 | Malmö FF | 4 – 0 | Husqvarna IF | Malmö IP, Malmö |
| | J.Andersson, (o.g.); Ringdahl | | | Attendance: 1,079 |

| 13 June 1920 Round 5 | Malmö FF | 3 – 2 | Jönköpings IS | Malmö IP, Malmö |
| | J.Andersson, Svensson | | | Attendance: 679 |

| 24 October 1920 Round 6 | IS Halmia | 3 – 3 | Malmö FF | Halmstad |
| | | | J.Andersson; Nilsson; Nyberg |

| 7 November 1920 Round 7 | Malmö FF | 5 – 3 | Landskrona BoIS | Malmö IP, Malmö |
| | J.Andersson,, H.Andersson; Ringdahl | | | Attendance: 1,022 |

| 15 May 1921 Round 8 | Husqvarna IF | 4 – 2 | Malmö FF | Huskvarna |
| | | | Lindblad; J.Andersson |

| 16 May 1921 Round 9 | Jönköpings IS | 2 – 3 | Malmö FF | Jönköping |
| | | | Lindblad, H.Andersson |

| 1 June 1921 Round 10 | Malmö FF | 2 – 1 | IFK Hälsingborg | Malmö IP, Malmö |
| | J.Andersson; Lindblad | | | Attendance: 784 |

=== Svenska Mästerskapet ===
| 5 June 1921 Second qualifying round | Malmö FF | 3 – 1 | IFK Hässleholm | Malmö IP, Malmö |
| | Ringdahl; Florin; H.Andersson | | | Attendance: 423 |

| 10 August 1921 Third qualifying round | Landskrona BoIS | 6 – 4 | Malmö FF | Landskrona |
| | | | Ringdahl, Lindblad; H.Andersson |
