= 1931–32 Allsvenskan =

8th season of Allsvenskan

Allsvenskan
- Season: 1931–32
- Champions: AIK
- Relegated: IFK Malmö; Hallstahammars SK
- Top goalscorer: Carl-Erik Holmberg, Örgryte IS (29)
- Average attendance: 7,188

Allsvenskan 1931–32, part of the 1931–32 Swedish football season, was the eighth Allsvenskan season played. The first match was played 2 August 1931 and the last match was played 5 June 1932. AIK won the league ahead of runners-up Örgryte IS, while IFK Malmö and Hallstahammars SK were relegated.

== Participating clubs ==
Location of the participating clubs

Club	Last season	First season in league	First season of current spell
AIK	2nd	1924–25	1924–25
IF Elfsborg	10th	1926–27	1926–27
IFK Eskilstuna	9th	1924–25	1930–31
GAIS	1st	1924–25	1924–25
IFK Göteborg	3rd	1924–25	1924–25
Hallstahammars SK	1st (Division 2 Norra)	1931–32	1931–32
Hälsingborgs IF	4th	1924–25	1924–25
Landskrona BoIS	5th	1924–25	1924–25
Malmö FF	1st (Division 2 Södra)	1931–32	1931–32
IFK Malmö	6th	1924–25	1928–29
IK Sleipner	8th	1924–25	1924–25
Örgryte IS	7th	1924–25	1924–25

== League table ==
Pos	Team	Pld	W	D	L	GF	GA	GD	Pts	Qualification or relegation
1	AIK (C)	22	12	9	1	58	33	+25	33	
2	Örgryte IS	22	13	5	4	67	37	+30	31	
3	GAIS	22	11	8	3	45	29	+16	30	
4	IFK Göteborg	22	11	4	7	47	34	+13	26	
5	IFK Eskilstuna	22	9	5	8	50	44	+6	23	
6	IK Sleipner	22	8	6	8	41	35	+6	22	
7	IF Elfsborg	22	8	6	8	38	35	+3	22	
8	Hälsingborgs IF	22	9	3	10	45	44	+1	21	
9	Malmö FF	22	6	4	12	48	68	−20	16	
10	Landskrona BoIS	22	4	8	10	35	58	−23	16	
11	IFK Malmö (R)	22	4	6	12	32	55	−23	14	Relegation to Division 2
12	Hallstahammar (R)	22	2	6	14	29	63	−34	10	Relegation to Division 2

Rules for classification: 1) points; 2) goal difference; 3) number of goals scored.
(C) Champions; (R) Relegated

== Results ==
Home \ Away	AIK	IFE	IFKE	GAI	IFKG	HSK	HIF	LBoIS	MFF	IFKM	IKS	ÖIS
AIK Fotboll		3–1	2–1	1–1	3–0	7–1	2–0	3–3	5–5	3–2	2–0	1–1
IF Elfsborg	1–2		1–1	1–1	2–3	4–0	1–0	2–2	3–3	3–0	1–0	3–3
IFK Eskilstuna	3–3	0–0		2–0	1–0	3–1	2–3	7–0	3–3	0–1	6–0	1–5
GAIS	2–2	2–1	1–3		2–0	2–0	4–2	2–0	3–0	4–0	1–1	2–2
IFK Göteborg	2–1	4–1	2–4	1–2		6–1	1–1	2–2	6–1	1–0	5–2	1–4
Hallstahammars SK	1–3	1–2	3–4	3–5	0–4		1–2	2–2	4–0	2–2	0–2	2–2
Hälsingborgs IF	1–1	1–3	2–1	3–2	5–1	0–1		5–1	5–2	2–2	3–2	3–5
Landskrona BoIS	3–5	0–2	5–0	0–1	0–0	1–1	1–0		4–0	4–2	0–0	3–7
Malmö FF	2–4	2–0	2–3	3–3	0–1	3–2	3–5	6–1		3–2	2–4	4–5
IFK Malmö	1–1	2–1	3–3	2–2	1–5	2–2	2–1	5–0	1–2		0–5	1–3
IK Sleipner	1–3	2–3	4–0	2–2	1–1	1–1	3–0	1–1	3–0	4–0		2–0
Örgryte IS	1–1	3–2	3–2	0–1	0–1	6–0	3–1	5–2	1–2	4–1	4–1	

Legend: Blue = home team win; Yellow = draw; Red = away team win.

== Top scorers ==
	Player	Nat	Club	Goals
1	Carl-Erik Holmberg	(Sweden)	Örgryte IS	29
2	Harry Lundahl	(Sweden)	IFK Eskilstuna	23
3	Hans Håkansson	(Sweden)	Malmö FF	17
4	Rupert Andersson	(Sweden)	IK Sleipner	15
5	Albin Dahl	(Sweden)	Hälsingborgs IF	14
5	Rolf Gardtman	(Sweden)	Örgryte IS	14
5	Erik Persson	(Sweden)	AIK	14

== Attendances ==
No.	Club	Average attendance	Highest attendance
1	AIK	17,728	21,376
2	IFK Göteborg	9,836	21,580
3	Örgryte IS	9,777	20,571
4	GAIS	7,746	16,075
5	IFK Malmö	7,089	8,960
6	IK Sleipner	7,070	14,540
7	Malmö FF	6,844	8,623
8	IFK Eskilstuna	5,345	16,562
9	Hälsingborgs IF	5,335	12,226
10	IF Elfsborg	4,240	6,537
11	Hallstahammars SK	2,654	6,204
12	Landskrona BoIS	2,609	4,111
