= 1943–44 Malmö FF season =

Malmö FF
1943/44 season
- Chairman: (Sweden) Eric Persson
- Manager: (Sweden) Sven Nilsson
- Stadium: Malmö IP
- Allsvenskan: 1st
- Svenska Cupen: Winners
- Top goalscorer: Börje Tapper; Stellan Nilsson (11)
Home colours

Malmö FF competed in Allsvenskan and Svenska Cupen for the 1943/44 season. For the first time the club won both competitions. The season was the beginning of a very successful era in Malmö FF's history as the club would finish within the first three positions in the league table for nine more seasons, winning five Swedish championships and five cup championships in the process.

== Players ==
=== Squad stats ===
No.	Pos	Nat	Player	Total		Allsvenskan	
No.	Pos	Nat	Player	Apps	Goals	Apps	Goals
	GK	(Sweden) SWE	Helge Bengtsson	22	0	22	0
	MF	(Sweden) SWE	Börje Tapper	22	11	22	11
		(Sweden) SWE	Kjell Rosén	22	9	22	9
	DF	(Sweden) SWE	Erik Nilsson	22	0	22	0
		(Sweden) SWE	Carl-Erik Sandberg	22	1	22	1
	MF	(Sweden) SWE	Stellan Nilsson	22	11	22	11
		(Sweden) SWE	Hans Malmström	22	0	22	0
		(Sweden) SWE	Kjell Hjertsson	21	0	21	0
		(Sweden) SWE	Sture Mårtensson	20	2	20	2
		(Sweden) SWE	Arne Hjertsson	14	4	14	4
		(Sweden) SWE	Gustav Nilsson	11	7	11	7
	MF	(Sweden) SWE	Egon Jönsson	10	6	10	6
		(Sweden) SWE	Börje Persson	8	2	8	2
		(Sweden) SWE	Bror Eliasson	2	0	2	0
		(Sweden) SWE	Erik Svensson	1	0	1	0
		(Sweden) SWE	Sven Hjertsson	1	1	1	1

== Club ==
=== Other information ===
Chairman	(Sweden) Eric Persson
Ground (capacity and dimensions)	Malmö IP ( / )

Updated to match played 19 October
Source: Malmö FF and Malmö IP

== Competitions ==
=== Overall ===
Competition	Started round	Current position / round	Final position / round	First match	Last match
Allsvenskan	—	—	1st	1 August 1943	11 June 1944
Svenska Cupen	2R	—	Winners	16 July 1944	1 October 1944

Updated to match played 19 October
Source: Competitions

=== Allsvenskan ===
==== Results summary ====
Overall								Home						Away					
Pld	W	D	L	GF	GA	GD	Pts	W	D	L	GF	GA	GD	W	D	L	GF	GA	GD
22	17	3	2	54	20	+34	37	10	1	0	31	9	+22	7	2	2	23	11	+12

Last updated: 19 October.

==== League table ====
Pos	Team	Pld	W	D	L	GF	GA	GD	Pts
1	Malmö FF (C)	22	17	3	2	54	22	+32	37
2	IF Elfsborg	22	15	2	5	63	29	+34	32
3	AIK	22	16	0	6	54	25	+29	32
4	IFK Norrköping	22	13	4	5	53	31	+22	30
5	IFK Göteborg	22	12	3	7	69	42	+27	27

Rules for classification: 1) points; 2) goal difference; 3) number of goals scored.
(C) Champions
