= 1932–33 Malmö FF season =

Malmö FF
1932–33 season
- Chairman: Fritz Landgren
- Manager: Carl Wijk
- Stadium: Malmö IP
- Allsvenskan: 9th
- Top goalscorer: Hans Håkansson (15)
Home colours

Malmö FF competed in Allsvenskan for the 1932–33 season.

== Club ==
=== Other information ===
| Chairman | (Sweden) Fritz Landgren |
| Ground (capacity and dimensions) | Malmö IP ( / ) |

Source: Malmö FF and Malmö IP
