= Ove Andersson (footballer) =

Swedish footballer

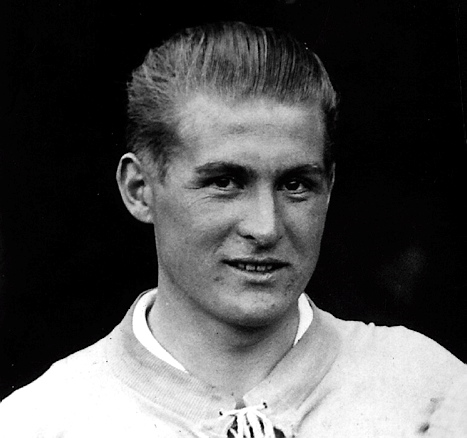
- Ove Andersson

Personal information
- Full name: Ove Andersson
- Date of birth: 14 March 1916
- Place of birth: Malmö, Sweden
- Date of death: 1983 (aged 66–67)
- Place of death: Borås, Sweden
- Position: Midfielder

Youth career
- BK Frigg
- Malmö IS

Senior career*
Years	Team	Apps	(Gls)
1935–1939	Malmö FF	47	(20)
–1948	Rapax		
- * Club domestic league appearances and goals

Ove Andersson (14 March 1916, Malmö – 1983, Borås) was a Swedish footballer. He is notable for being first Allsvenskan top scorer for Malmö FF, sharing the title with Yngve Lindgren of Örgryte IS and Erik Persson of AIK with 16 goals each for the 1938–39 season.

== Honours ==
=== Individual ===
- Allsvenskan Top Scorer: 1938–39
