= 1927–28 Malmö FF season =

Malmö FF
1927–28 season
- Chairman: (Sweden) Janne Johansson
- Stadium: Malmö IP
- Division 2 Sydsvenska Serien: 3rd
- Top goalscorer: Ivar Roslund; Hans Håkansson (14)
Home colours

Malmö FF is a Swedish football team that competed in the country's Division 2 Sydsvenska Serien (South Sweden series) for the 1927–28 season.

== Players ==
=== Squad stats ===
No.	Pos	Nat	Player	Total		Div 2 Sydsvenska Serien	
No.	Pos	Nat	Player	Apps	Goals	Apps	Goals
		(Sweden) SWE	Theodor Persson	20	0	20	0
		(Sweden) SWE	John Torstensson	20	7	20	7
		(Sweden) SWE	Gösta Nilsson	20	8	20	8
		(Sweden) SWE	Ivar Roslund	19	14	19	14
		(Sweden) SWE	Erik Andersson	19	0	19	0
		(Sweden) SWE	Ture Isberg	18	3	18	3
		(Sweden) SWE	Algot Christoffersson	18	0	18	0
		(Sweden) SWE	Henry Dahl	18	0	18	0
	FW	(Sweden) SWE	Hans Håkansson	17	14	17	14
		(Sweden) SWE	Erik Ohlsson	16	0	16	0
		(Sweden) SWE	Erik Svensson	13	11	13	11
		(Sweden) SWE	Gunnar Martinsson	4	0	4	0
		(Sweden) SWE	Hilding Andersson	4	2	4	2
		(Sweden) SWE	Harry Gullander	4	0	4	0
		(Sweden) SWE	Nils Nilsson	3	2	3	2
		(Sweden) SWE	Otto Bengtsson	2	0	2	0
		(Sweden) SWE	Axel Håkansson	1	0	1	0
		(Sweden) SWE	Carl Florin	1	0	1	0
		(Sweden) SWE	John Rosén	1	0	1	0
		(Sweden) SWE	Erik Wern	1	0	1	0
		(Sweden) SWE	Karl Karlsson	1	0	1	0

== Club ==
=== Other information ===
Chairman	(Sweden) Fritz Landgren
Ground (capacity and dimensions)	Malmö IP ( / )

Updated to match played 17 October
Source: Malmö FF and Malmö IP
