= 1928–29 Malmö FF season =

Malmö FF
1928–29 season
- Chairman: Janne Johansson (until 1928); Fritz Landgren (from 1929)
- Stadium: Malmö IP
- Division 2 Södra: 4th
- Top goalscorer: Hans Håkansson (10)
Home colours

Malmö FF competed in Division 2 Södra, finishing fourth in the league under chairman Fritz Landgren.

== Club ==
=== Other information ===
Chairman	(Sweden) Fritz Landgren
Ground (capacity and dimensions)	Malmö IP ( / )

Source: Malmö FF and Malmö IP
