= 1923–24 Malmö FF season =

Malmö FF
1923–24 season
- Chairman: Fritz Landgren
- Stadium: Malmö IP
- Division 2 Sydsvenska Serien: 2nd
- Top goalscorer: Fredrik Lindblad (8)
Home colours

Malmö FF competed in Division 2 Sydsvenska Serien for the 1923–24 season.

== Players ==
=== Squad stats ===
| No. | Pos | Nat | Player | Total | | Div 2 Sydsvenska Serien | |
| No. | Pos | Nat | Player | Apps | Goals | Apps | Goals |
|---|---|---|---|---|---|---|---|
| | | (Sweden) SWE | Axel Håkansson | 10 | 0 | 10 | 0 |
| | | (Sweden) SWE | Algot Christoffersson | 10 | 0 | 10 | 0 |
| | | (Sweden) SWE | Fredrik Lindblad | 10 | 8 | 10 | 8 |
| | | (Sweden) SWE | Wilhelm Nilsson | 9 | 0 | 9 | 0 |
| | | (Sweden) SWE | Hilding Andersson | 9 | 1 | 9 | 1 |
| | | (Sweden) SWE | John Rosén | 9 | 0 | 9 | 0 |
| | | (Sweden) SWE | Emil Gudmundsson | 7 | 2 | 7 | 2 |
| | | (Sweden) SWE | Gustav Engvall | 7 | 0 | 7 | 0 |
| | | (Sweden) SWE | Carl Florin | 6 | 0 | 6 | 0 |
| | | (Sweden) SWE | Gösta Nilsson | 6 | 4 | 6 | 4 |
| | | (Sweden) SWE | John Torstensson | 5 | 1 | 5 | 1 |
| | | (Sweden) SWE | Ebbe Löfgren | 4 | 0 | 4 | 0 |
| | | (Sweden) SWE | Erik Svensson | 4 | 2 | 4 | 2 |
| | | (Sweden) SWE | Elvir Svensson | 3 | 1 | 3 | 1 |
| | | (Sweden) SWE | Knut Fagerström | 3 | 1 | 3 | 1 |
| | | (Sweden) SWE | Algot Johansson | 2 | 0 | 2 | 0 |
| | | (Sweden) SWE | Harry Gullander | 2 | 0 | 2 | 0 |
| | | (Sweden) SWE | Otto Nyberg | 1 | 0 | 1 | 0 |
| | | (Sweden) SWE | Nils Nilsson | 1 | 0 | 1 | 0 |
| | | (Sweden) SWE | Vincent Gullander | 1 | 0 | 1 | 0 |
| | | (Sweden) SWE | August Andersson | 1 | 0 | 1 | 0 |

== Club ==
=== Other information ===
| Chairman | (Sweden) Fritz Landgren |
| Ground (capacity and dimensions) | Malmö IP ( / ) |

Updated to match played 17 October
Source: Malmö FF and Malmö IP
