= 1929–30 Malmö FF season =

Malmö FF
1929–30 season
- Chairman: Fritz Landgren
- Stadium: Malmö IP
- Division 2 Södra: 2nd
- Top goalscorer: Hans Håkansson (21)
Home colours

Malmö FF competed in Division 2 Södra for the 1929–30 season.

== Club ==
=== Other information ===
Chairman	(Sweden) Fritz Landgren
Ground (capacity and dimensions)	Malmö IP ( / )

Source: Malmö FF and Malmö IP
