= 1930–31 Malmö FF season =

Malmö FF
1930–31 season
- Chairman: Fritz Landgren
- Stadium: Malmö IP
- Division 2 Södra: 1st (promoted)
- Top goalscorer: Hans Håkansson (13)
Home colours

Malmö FF competed in Division 2 Södra for the 1930–31 season. They won the league and were promoted to the first-tier league Allsvenskan for the first time in the club's history.

== Club ==
=== Other information ===
Chairman	(Sweden) Fritz Landgren
Ground (capacity and dimensions)	Malmö IP ( / )

Source: Malmö FF and Malmö IP
