= Mats Werner =

Swedish footballer

Personal information
- Full name: Mats Rune Werner
- Date of birth: 1 June 1953 (age 73)
- Place of birth: Värnamo, Sweden
- Positions: Forward; defender

Youth career
- Hammarby IF

Senior career*
Years	Team	Apps	(Gls)
1971–1984	Hammarby IF	251	(46)
1984	Vasalunds IF	14	(5)
Total		265	(51)

International career
1970–1971	Sweden U19	7	(0)
1972–1979	Sweden U21	7	(1)
1978	Sweden B	1	(0)
1976–1979	Sweden	6	(1)
- * Club domestic league appearances and goals

Mats Rune "Matte" Werner (born 1 June 1953) is a Swedish former professional footballer. He played for Hammarby IF throughout most of his career.

== Club career ==
Trained in the youth ranks of Hammarby IF, Werner made his debut in Allsvenskan, the domestic top tier, for the club in 1971, at age 17.

Between 1971 and 1976, Hammarby consistently finished mid-table, being unable to produce any sort of challenge for the Swedish champion title. During this period, Werner became one of Hammarby's most important players, together with experienced Tom Turesson and other younger talents like Jan Sjöström, Kenneth Ohlsson and Ronnie Hellström.

Hammarby reached the final of Svenska Cupen in 1977, the main domestic cup, but lost 0–1 to Östers IF.

In 1979, Werner had re-positioned himself from a tough defender to a physical forward, a move that proved highly successful. The same season, he became the first ever top scorer in Allsvenskan to represent Hammarby, scoring 14 goals in 26 league games.

The highlight of Werner's career came in 1982 when Hammarby finished second in the table, going unbeaten the whole season. In the following playoff to decide the Swedish champion, the club went on to beat Örgryte in the quarter-finals and Elfsborg in the semi-finals. In the finals against IFK Göteborg, Hammarby won 2–1 in the first leg away, but lost 1–3 in the home game at Söderstadion to a record crowd, missing out on the gold medal.

Throughout his time at Hammarby, Werner went on trial with German giants Bayern Munich and reportedly attracted interest from Standard Liège, Kaiserslautern and Toronto Blizzard. However, he remained with the club for the most of career, making 251 league appearances and scoring 46 goals in total.

Halfway through 1984, Werner joined fellow Stockholm-based club Vasalunds IF in Division 1, Sweden's second tier. He played the remainder of the season with the club before retiring from football at the end of the year, aged 31.

In 2004, Werner was voted as Hammarby's eleventh biggest profile throughout its history.

== International career ==
In a period of three years, Werner won 6 caps for Sweden. He scored his only international goal in a 6–0 friendly win against Finland on 11 August 1976, home at Malmö Stadion.

== Personal life ==
He is married to Yvonne Werner, who has been the long-term head chef at Hammarby's training ground Årsta IP.

== Honours ==
Individual

Hammarby IF

- Allsvenskan top scorer: 1979
