= 1922–23 Malmö FF season =

Malmö FF
1922-23 season
- Chairman: Fritz Landgren
- Manager: Hans Ruff
- Stadium: Malmö IP
- Division 1 Svenska Serien Västra: 6th
- Top goalscorer: Emil Gudmundsson (3)
Home colours

Malmö FF competed in Division 1 Svenska Serien Västra for the 1922–23 season.

== Players ==
=== Squad stats ===
No.	Pos	Nat	Player	Total		Div 1 Svenska Serien Västra	
No.	Pos	Nat	Player	Apps	Goals	Apps	Goals
		(Sweden) SWE	Axel Håkansson	10	0	10	0
		(Sweden) SWE	Wilhelm Nilsson	10	0	10	0
		(Sweden) SWE	Carl Florin	10	0	10	0
		(Sweden) SWE	Carl Andersson	10	0	10	0
		(Sweden) SWE	Hilding Andersson	10	0	10	0
		(Sweden) SWE	John Torstensson	10	0	10	0
		(Sweden) SWE	Emil Gudmundsson	10	3	10	3
		(Sweden) SWE	Ebbe Löfgren	9	0	9	0
		(Sweden) SWE	Algot Christoffersson	7	0	7	0
		(Sweden) SWE	Gustav Lindeblad	6	0	6	0
		(Sweden) SWE	Fredrik Lindblad	5	1	5	1
		(Sweden) SWE	Hilder Svensson	4	1	4	1
		(Sweden) SWE	John Rosén	3	1	3	1
		(Sweden) SWE	Otto Nyberg	3	0	3	0
		(Sweden) SWE	Johan Andersson	2	0	2	0
		(Sweden) SWE	Johan Sjöberg	1	0	1	0
		(Sweden) SWE	Gösta Nilsson	1	0	1	0
		(Sweden) SWE	Algot Johansson	1	0	1	0

== Club ==
=== Other information ===
Chairman	(Sweden) Fritz Landgren
Ground (capacity and dimensions)	Malmö IP ( / )

Updated to match played 17 October
Source: Malmö FF and Malmö IP

== Competitions ==
=== Overall ===
Competition	Started round	Current position / round	Final position / round	First match	Last match
Div 1 Svenska Serien Västra	—	—	6th	30 April 1922	12 November 1922

Updated to match played 17 October
Source: Competitions

=== Division 1 Svenska Serien Västra ===
==== Results summary ====
Overall								Home						Away					
Pld	W	D	L	GF	GA	GD	Pts	W	D	L	GF	GA	GD	W	D	L	GF	GA	GD
10	1	2	7	6	19	−13	4	0	0	5	2	9	−7	1	2	2	4	10	−6

Last updated: 17 October.
