= 1987 in Swedish football =

The 1987 season in Swedish football started in January 1987 and ended in December 1987.

== Honours ==
=== Official titles ===
| Title | Team | Reason |
|---|---|---|
| Swedish Champions 1987 | IFK Göteborg | Winners of Allsvenskan play-off |
| Swedish Cup Champions 1986–87 | Kalmar FF | Winners of Svenska Cupen |

=== Competitions ===
| Level | Competition | Team |
|---|---|---|
| 1st level | Allsvenskan 1987 | Malmö FF |
| 1st level | Allsvenskan play-off 1987 | IFK Göteborg |
| 2nd level | Division 1 Norra 1987 | Djurgårdens IF |
| 2nd level | Division 1 Södra 1987 | GAIS |
| Cup | Svenska Cupen 1986–87 | Kalmar FF |

== Promotions, relegations and qualifications ==
=== Promotions ===
| Promoted from | Promoted to | Team | Reason |
|---|---|---|---|
| Division 1 Norra 1987 | Allsvenskan 1988 | Djurgårdens IF | Winners |
| Division 1 Södra 1987 | Allsvenskan 1988 | GAIS | Winners |
| Division 2 1987 | Division 1 Norra 1988 | IFK Holmsund | Winners of Norra |
| Division 2 1987 | Division 1 Norra 1988 | Väsby IK | Winners of Mellersta |
| Division 2 1987 | Division 1 Södra 1988 | Falkenbergs FF | Winners of Västra |
| Division 2 1987 | Division 1 Södra 1988 | Markaryds IF | Winners of Södra |

=== League transfers ===
| Transferred from | Transferred to | Team | Reason |
|---|---|---|---|
| Division 1 Södra 1987 | Division 1 Norra 1988 | Åtvidabergs FF | Geographical composition |

=== Relegations ===
| Relegated from | Relegated to | Team | Reason |
|---|---|---|---|
| Allsvenskan 1987 | Division 1 Södra 1988 | Halmstads BK | 11th team |
| Allsvenskan 1987 | Division 1 Södra 1988 | IF Elfsborg | 12th team |
| Division 1 Norra 1987 | Division 2 1988 | IFK Västerås | 13th team |
| Division 1 Norra 1987 | Division 2 1988 | Degerfors IF | 14th team |
| Division 1 Södra 1987 | Division 2 1988 | Kalmar FF | 13th team |
| Division 1 Södra 1987 | Division 2 1988 | Skövde AIK | 14th team |

=== International qualifications ===
| Qualified for | Enters | Team | Reason |
|---|---|---|---|
| European Cup 1988–89 | 1st round | IFK Göteborg | Winners of Allsvenskan play-off |
| UEFA Cup 1988–89 | 1st round | Malmö FF | Winners of Allsvenskan |
| UEFA Cup 1988–89 | 1st round | Östers IF | 4th team in Allsvenskan |
| UEFA Cup 1988–89 | 1st round | IK Brage | 5th team in Allsvenskan |
| UEFA Cup Winners' Cup 1987–88 | 1st round | Kalmar FF | Winners of Svenska Cupen |
| International Football Cup 1988 | Group stage | Malmö FF | Winners of Allsvenskan |
| International Football Cup 1988 | Group stage | IFK Norrköping | 2nd team in Allsvenskan |
| International Football Cup 1988 | Group stage | IFK Göteborg | 3rd team in Allsvenskan |
| International Football Cup 1988 | Group stage | Östers IF | 4th team in Allsvenskan |
| International Football Cup 1988 | Group stage | Örgryte IS | Unknown |

== Domestic results ==
=== Allsvenskan 1987 ===
| | Team | Pld | W | D | L | GF | | GA | GD | Pts |
|---|---|---|---|---|---|---|---|---|---|---|
| 1 | Malmö FF | 22 | 14 | 6 | 2 | 50 | – | 21 | +29 | 34 |
| 2 | IFK Norrköping | 22 | 11 | 7 | 4 | 33 | – | 19 | +14 | 29 |
| 3 | IFK Göteborg | 22 | 9 | 8 | 5 | 39 | – | 24 | +15 | 26 |
| 4 | Östers IF | 22 | 10 | 4 | 8 | 25 | – | 26 | -1 | 24 |
| 5 | IK Brage | 22 | 7 | 10 | 5 | 21 | – | 23 | -2 | 24 |
| 6 | Hammarby IF | 22 | 6 | 10 | 6 | 37 | – | 27 | +10 | 22 |
| 7 | Västra Frölunda IF | 22 | 6 | 9 | 7 | 21 | – | 29 | -8 | 21 |
| 8 | Örgryte IS | 22 | 5 | 10 | 7 | 32 | – | 33 | -1 | 20 |
| 9 | AIK | 22 | 5 | 10 | 7 | 15 | – | 17 | -2 | 20 |
| 10 | GIF Sundsvall | 22 | 4 | 9 | 9 | 25 | – | 31 | -6 | 17 |
| 11 | Halmstads BK | 22 | 4 | 9 | 9 | 22 | – | 39 | -17 | 17 |
| 12 | IF Elfsborg | 22 | 3 | 4 | 15 | 18 | – | 49 | -31 | 10 |

=== Allsvenskan play-off 1987 ===
Semi-finals

October 10, 1987

| Östers IF | 1–2 | Malmö FF |

?, ?
October 17, 1987

| Malmö FF | 2–1 | Östers IF |

?, ?

October 10, 1987

| IFK Göteborg | 3–0 | IFK Norrköping |

?, ?
October 17, 1987

| IFK Norrköping | 2–2 | IFK Göteborg |

?, ?

Final

| IFK Göteborg | 1–0 | Malmö FF |

Ullevi, Gothenburg

| Malmö FF | 2–1 (ag) | IFK Göteborg |

Malmö Stadion, Malmö

=== Division 1 Norra 1987 ===
| | Team | Pld | W | D | L | GF | | GA | GD | Pts |
|---|---|---|---|---|---|---|---|---|---|---|
| 1 | Djurgårdens IF | 26 | 16 | 6 | 4 | 60 | – | 26 | +24 | 38 |
| 2 | IFK Eskilstuna | 26 | 14 | 7 | 5 | 48 | – | 30 | +18 | 35 |
| 3 | Örebro SK | 26 | 12 | 9 | 5 | 43 | – | 25 | +18 | 33 |
| 4 | Gefle IF | 26 | 13 | 7 | 6 | 43 | – | 27 | +16 | 33 |
| 5 | Västerås SK | 26 | 12 | 6 | 8 | 35 | – | 20 | +15 | 30 |
| 6 | BK Forward | 26 | 12 | 6 | 8 | 37 | – | 28 | +9 | 30 |
| 7 | IF Brommapojkarna | 26 | 9 | 7 | 10 | 48 | – | 52 | -4 | 25 |
| 8 | Karlstads BK | 26 | 10 | 5 | 11 | 41 | – | 45 | -4 | 25 |
| 9 | Luleå FF/IFK | 26 | 8 | 9 | 9 | 30 | – | 38 | -8 | 25 |
| 10 | Skellefteå AIK | 26 | 9 | 6 | 11 | 28 | – | 29 | -1 | 24 |
| 11 | Vasalunds IF | 26 | 6 | 8 | 12 | 36 | – | 47 | -11 | 20 |
| 12 | IFK Mora | 26 | 8 | 4 | 14 | 25 | – | 41 | -16 | 20 |
| 13 | IFK Västerås | 26 | 6 | 5 | 15 | 24 | – | 56 | -32 | 17 |
| 14 | Degerfors IF | 26 | 2 | 5 | 19 | 23 | – | 58 | -35 | 9 |

=== Division 1 Södra 1987 ===
| | Team | Pld | W | D | L | GF | | GA | GD | Pts |
|---|---|---|---|---|---|---|---|---|---|---|
| 1 | GAIS | 26 | 15 | 7 | 4 | 47 | – | 16 | +31 | 37 |
| 2 | Trelleborgs FF | 26 | 12 | 12 | 2 | 47 | – | 20 | +27 | 36 |
| 3 | Kalmar AIK | 26 | 12 | 7 | 7 | 38 | – | 33 | +5 | 33 |
| 4 | Myresjö IF | 26 | 10 | 8 | 8 | 45 | – | 41 | +4 | 28 |
| 5 | IK Oddevold | 26 | 10 | 6 | 10 | 39 | – | 36 | +3 | 26 |
| 6 | Åtvidabergs FF | 26 | 7 | 11 | 8 | 28 | – | 28 | 0 | 25 |
| 7 | Ifö/Bromölla IF | 26 | 8 | 9 | 9 | 27 | – | 30 | -3 | 25 |
| 8 | Mjällby AIF | 26 | 6 | 13 | 7 | 23 | – | 29 | -6 | 25 |
| 9 | BK Häcken | 26 | 9 | 7 | 10 | 24 | – | 31 | -7 | 25 |
| 10 | Landskrona BoIS | 26 | 8 | 8 | 10 | 24 | – | 33 | -9 | 24 |
| 11 | IFK Hässleholm | 26 | 6 | 10 | 10 | 28 | – | 30 | -2 | 22 |
| 12 | Karlskrona AIF | 26 | 7 | 8 | 11 | 24 | – | 33 | -9 | 22 |
| 13 | Kalmar FF | 26 | 8 | 5 | 13 | 30 | – | 38 | -8 | 21 |
| 14 | Skövde AIK | 26 | 5 | 7 | 14 | 23 | – | 43 | -20 | 17 |

=== Svenska Cupen 1986–87 ===
Final

June 28, 1987

| Kalmar FF | 2–0 | GAIS |

Råsunda, Solna

== National team results ==
April 18, 1987
Friendly
№ 630

| Soviet Union | 1–3 | Sweden |
|---|---|---|
| Lönn 68' (og) | | Limpar 63'; Magnusson 66', 70 |

Dinamo Stadium, Tbilisi
Attendance: 27,500
Referee: Diakonowicz (Poland)

May 24, 1987
Euro 88 qualification
№ 631

| Sweden | 1–0 | Malta |
|---|---|---|
| Ekström 13' |

Nya Ullevi, Gothenburg
Attendance: 16,165
Referee: Natri (Finland)

June 3, 1987
Euro 88 qualification
№ 632

| Sweden | 1–0 | Italy |
|---|---|---|
| Larsson 24' |

Råsunda, Solna
Attendance: 40,070
Referee: Pauly (West Germany)

June 17, 1987
Euro 88 qualification
№ 633

| Switzerland | 1–1 | Sweden |
|---|---|---|
| Halter 58' | | Ekström 61' |

Stade Olympique de la Pontaise, Lausanne
Attendance: 7,000
Referee: Geurds (Netherlands)

August 12, 1987
Friendly
№ 634

| Norway | 0–0 | Sweden |

Ullevaal, Oslo
Attendance: 22,237
Referee: Palsi (Finland)

August 26, 1987
Friendly
№ 635

| Sweden | 1–0 | Denmark |
|---|---|---|
| Magnusson 87' |

Råsunda, Solna
Attendance: 15,637
Referee: Sandoz (Switzerland)

September 23, 1987
Euro 88 qualification
№ 636

| Sweden | 0–1 | Portugal |
|---|---|---|
| | | Gomes 34' |

Råsunda, Solna
Attendance: 28,916
Referee: Butenko (Soviet Union)

October 14, 1987
Friendly
№ 637

| West Germany | 1–1 | Sweden |
|---|---|---|
| Littbarski 17' | | Hysén 62' |

Parkstadion, Gelsenkirchen
Attendance: 31,000
Referee: Sánchez Armínio (Spain)

November 14, 1987
Euro 88 qualification
№ 638

| Italy | 2–1 | Sweden |
|---|---|---|
| Vialli 27', 45' | | Larsson 38' |

Stadio San Paolo, Naples
Attendance: 59,045
Referee: Prokop (East Germany)
