= Trollebo IP =

Football stadium in Hallstahammar, Sweden

Coordinates: 59°37′14″N 16°13′29″E

Trollebo IP is a football stadium in Hallstahammar, Sweden and the home stadium for the football team Hallstahammars SK.
