= 1926–27 Malmö FF season =

Malmö FF
1926–27 season
- Chairman: (Sweden) Fritz Landgren (-1926); Janne Johansson (-1927)
- Stadium: Malmö IP
- Division 2 Sydsvenska Serien: 6th
- Top goalscorer: Erik Svensson (10)
Home colours

Malmö FF competed in Division 2 Sydsvenska Serien for the 1926–27 season.

== Players ==
=== Squad stats ===
No.	Pos	Nat	Player	Total		Div 2 Sydsvenska Serien	
No.	Pos	Nat	Player	Apps	Goals	Apps	Goals
		(Sweden) SWE	Valdemar Wiberg	18	0	18	0
		(Sweden) SWE	Theodor Persson	18	0	18	0
		(Sweden) SWE	John Torstensson	18	1	18	1
		(Sweden) SWE	Ture Isberg	18	3	18	3
		(Sweden) SWE	Erik Svensson	17	10	17	10
		(Sweden) SWE	Algot Christoffersson	16	2	16	2
		(Sweden) SWE	Hilding Andersson	14	2	14	2
		(Sweden) SWE	Carl Florin	12	1	12	1
		(Sweden) SWE	Ivar Roslund	10	2	10	2
		(Sweden) SWE	Elvir Svensson	9	5	9	5
		(Sweden) SWE	Erik Ohlsson	9	0	9	0
		(Sweden) SWE	Nils Nilsson	7	3	7	3
		(Sweden) SWE	Gunnar Martinsson	5	0	5	0
		(Sweden) SWE	Gösta Nilsson	5	1	5	1
		(Sweden) SWE	Gustav Karlsson	4	0	4	0
		(Sweden) SWE	Otto Bengtsson	4	0	4	0
		(Sweden) SWE	John Rosén	3	0	3	0
		(Sweden) SWE	Martin Nordström	2	0	2	0
		(Sweden) SWE	Thore Martinsson	2	0	2	0
		(Sweden) SWE	August Andersson	2	0	2	0
		(Sweden) SWE	Carl Florin	2	0	2	0
		(Sweden) SWE	Thorsten Andersson	2	0	2	0
		(Sweden) SWE	Einar Larsson	1	0	1	0

== Club ==
=== Other information ===
Chairman	(Sweden) Fritz Landgren
Ground (capacity and dimensions)	Malmö IP ( / )

Updated to match played 17 October
Source: Malmö FF and Malmö IP
