= 1924–25 Malmö FF season =

Malmö FF
1924–25 season
- Chairman: (Sweden) Fritz Landgren
- Stadium: Malmö IP
- Division 2 Sydsvenska Serien: 5th
- Top goalscorer: Lars Öhrn (7)
Home colours

Malmö FF competed in Division 2 Sydsvenska Serien for the 1924–25 season.

== Players ==
=== Squad stats ===
| No. | Pos | Nat | Player | Total | | Div 2 Sydsvenska Serien | |
| No. | Pos | Nat | Player | Apps | Goals | Apps | Goals |
|---|---|---|---|---|---|---|---|
| | | (Sweden) SWE | Carl Florin | 13 | 0 | 13 | 0 |
| | | (Sweden) SWE | John Torstensson | 13 | 2 | 13 | 2 |
| | | (Sweden) SWE | Gustav Engvall | 11 | 0 | 11 | 0 |
| | | (Sweden) SWE | Ebbe Löfgren | 11 | 0 | 11 | 0 |
| | | (Sweden) SWE | John Rosén | 10 | 1 | 10 | 1 |
| | | (Sweden) SWE | Knut Fagerström | 9 | 0 | 9 | 0 |
| | | (Sweden) SWE | Algot Christoffersson | 9 | 0 | 9 | 0 |
| | | (Sweden) SWE | Hilding Andersson | 9 | 5 | 9 | 5 |
| | | (Sweden) SWE | Fredrik Lindblad | 9 | 6 | 9 | 6 |
| | | (Sweden) SWE | Lars Öhrn | 8 | 7 | 8 | 7 |
| | | (Sweden) SWE | Harry Gullander | 7 | 3 | 7 | 3 |
| | | (Sweden) SWE | Göte Lilja | 6 | 0 | 6 | 0 |
| | | (Sweden) SWE | Axel Håkansson | 5 | 0 | 5 | 0 |
| | | (Sweden) SWE | Erik Svensson | 5 | 4 | 5 | 4 |
| | | (Sweden) SWE | August Andersson | 4 | 1 | 4 | 1 |
| | | (Sweden) SWE | Ture Isberg | 4 | 4 | 4 | 4 |
| | | (Sweden) SWE | Gunnar Wictorin | 4 | 1 | 4 | 1 |
| | | (Sweden) SWE | Thorsten Andersson | 3 | 0 | 3 | 0 |
| | | (Sweden) SWE | Adolf Florin | 3 | 0 | 3 | 0 |
| | | (Sweden) SWE | Eric Nilsson | 3 | 0 | 3 | 0 |
| | | (Sweden) SWE | Otto Bengtsson | 3 | 0 | 3 | 0 |
| | | (Sweden) SWE | Martin Nordström | 2 | 0 | 2 | 0 |
| | | (Sweden) SWE | Wilhelm Nilsson | 1 | 0 | 1 | 0 |
| | | (Sweden) SWE | Gösta Nilsson | 1 | 1 | 1 | 1 |
| | | (Sweden) SWE | Gustav Karlsson | 1 | 0 | 1 | 0 |

== Club ==
=== Other information ===
| Chairman | (Sweden) Fritz Landgren |
| Ground (capacity and dimensions) | Malmö IP ( / ) |

Updated to match played 17 October
Source: Malmö FF and Malmö IP
