= 1925–26 Malmö FF season =

Malmö FF
1925–26 season
- Chairman: (Sweden) Fritz Landgren
- Stadium: Malmö IP
- Division 2 Sydsvenska Serien: 3rd
- Top goalscorer: Erik Svensson; John Rosén (7)
Home colours

Malmö FF competed in Division 2 Sydsvenska Serien for the 1925–26 season.

== Players ==
=== Squad stats ===
No.	Pos	Nat	Player	Total		Div 2 Sydsvenska Serien	
No.	Pos	Nat	Player	Apps	Goals	Apps	Goals
		(Sweden) SWE	John Torstensson	16	4	16	4
		(Sweden) SWE	Carl Florin	16	0	16	0
		(Sweden) SWE	Erik Svensson	16	7	16	7
		(Sweden) SWE	Hilding Andersson	15	6	15	6
		(Sweden) SWE	Algot Christoffersson	15	3	15	3
		(Sweden) SWE	Erik Ohlsson	15	0	15	0
		(Sweden) SWE	Ture Isberg	14	5	14	5
		(Sweden) SWE	John Rosén	13	7	13	7
		(Sweden) SWE	Gustav Karlsson	12	0	12	0
		(Sweden) SWE	Valdemar Wiberg	12	0	12	0
		(Sweden) SWE	Ivar Roslund	7	4	7	4
		(Sweden) SWE	Axel Håkansson	4	0	4	0
		(Sweden) SWE	Einar Larsson	4	0	4	0
		(Sweden) SWE	Nils Nilsson	3	0	3	0
		(Sweden) SWE	Fredrik Lindblad	3	4	3	4
		(Sweden) SWE	Gunnar Wictorin	3	1	3	1
		(Sweden) SWE	Lars Öhrn	2	2	2	2
		(Sweden) SWE	Harry Gullander	2	1	2	1
		(Sweden) SWE	August Andersson	1	0	1	0
		(Sweden) SWE	Otto Nyberg	1	0	1	0
		(Sweden) SWE	Johan Andersson	1	0	1	0
		(Sweden) SWE	Martin Nordström	1	0	1	0

== Club ==
=== Other information ===
Chairman	(Sweden) Fritz Landgren
Ground (capacity and dimensions)	Malmö IP ( / )

Updated to match played 17 October
Source: Malmö FF and Malmö IP
