= 1985 in Swedish football =

The 1985 season in Swedish football, starting January 1985 and ending December 1985:

== Honours ==
=== Official titles ===
Title	Team	Reason
Swedish Champions 1985	Örgryte IS	Winners of Allsvenskan play-off
Swedish Cup Champions 1984–85	AIK	Winners of Svenska Cupen

=== Competitions ===
Level	Competition	Team
1st level	Allsvenskan 1985	Malmö FF
1st level	Allsvenskan play-off 1985	Örgryte IS
2nd level	Division 2 Norra 1985	Djurgårdens IF
2nd level	Division 2 Södra 1985	IF Elfsborg
Cup	Svenska Cupen 1984–85	AIK

== Promotions, relegations and qualifications ==
=== Promotions ===
Promoted from	Promoted to	Team	Reason
Division 2 Norra 1985	Allsvenskan 1986	Djurgårdens IF	Winners of promotion play-off
Division 2 Södra 1985	Allsvenskan 1986	IF Elfsborg	Winners of promotion play-off
Division 3 1985	Division 2 Norra 1986	Enköpings SK	Winners of promotion play-off
Division 3 1985	Division 2 Norra 1986	Skellefteå AIK	Winners of promotion play-off
Division 3 1985	Division 2 Norra 1986	GIF Sundsvall	Winners of promotion play-off
Division 3 1985	Division 2 Södra 1986	Karlskrona AIF	Winners of promotion play-off
Division 3 1985	Division 2 Södra 1986	Karlstad BK	Winners of promotion play-off
Division 3 1985	Division 2 Södra 1986	Landskrona BoIS	Winners of promotion play-off

=== League transfers ===
Transferred from	Transferred to	Team	Reason
Division 2 Södra 1985	Division 2 Norra 1986	Degerfors IF	Geographical composition

=== Relegations ===
Relegated from	Relegated to	Team	Reason
Allsvenskan 1985	Division 2 Södra 1986	Mjällby AIF	11th team
Allsvenskan 1985	Division 2 Södra 1986	Trelleborgs FF	12th team
Division 2 Norra 1985	Division 3 1986	Karlslunds IF	12th team
Division 2 Norra 1985	Division 3 1986	Tyresö FF	13th team
Division 2 Norra 1985	Division 3 1986	Falu BS	14th team
Division 2 Södra 1985	Division 3 1986	Jönköpings Södra IF	12th team
Division 2 Södra 1985	Division 3 1986	IFK Malmö	13th team
Division 2 Södra 1985	Division 3 1986	IS Halmia	14th team

=== International qualifications ===
Qualified for	Enters	Team	Reason
European Cup 1986–87	1st round	Örgryte IS	Winners of Allsvenskan play-off
UEFA Cup 1986–87	1st round	Kalmar FF	2nd team in Allsvenskan
UEFA Cup 1986–87	1st round	IFK Göteborg	4th team in Allsvenskan
UEFA Cup Winners' Cup 1985–86	1st round	AIK	Winners of Svenska Cupen
International Football Cup 1986	Group stage	Malmö FF	Winners of Allsvenskan
International Football Cup 1986	Group stage	Kalmar FF	2nd team in Allsvenskan
International Football Cup 1986	Group stage	Örgryte IS	3rd team in Allsvenskan
International Football Cup 1986	Group stage	IFK Göteborg	4th team in Allsvenskan

== Domestic results ==
=== Allsvenskan 1985 ===

	Team	Pld	W	D	L	GF		GA	GD	Pts
1	Malmö FF	22	11	8	3	29	–	14	+15	30
2	Kalmar FF	22	10	8	4	36	–	30	+6	28
3	Örgryte IS	22	9	8	5	36	–	21	+15	26
4	IFK Göteborg	22	9	8	5	39	–	25	+14	26
5	AIK	22	10	6	6	29	–	19	+10	26
6	Hammarby IF	22	9	6	7	33	–	31	+2	24
7	Halmstads BK	22	7	7	8	25	–	31	-6	21
8	Östers IF	22	9	2	11	28	–	35	-7	20
9	IK Brage	22	5	9	8	26	–	28	-2	19
10	IFK Norrköping	22	6	5	11	26	–	35	-9	17
11	Mjällby AIF	22	4	7	11	21	–	41	-20	15
12	Trelleborgs FF	22	4	4	14	23	–	41	-18	12

=== Allsvenskan play-off 1985 ===
Semi-finals

October 20, 1985

IFK Göteborg	2–1	Malmö FF

?, ?
October 27, 1985

Malmö FF	0–2	IFK Göteborg

?, ?

October 19, 1985

Örgryte IS	4–2	Kalmar FF

?, ?
October 27, 1985

Kalmar FF	1–3	Örgryte IS

?, ?

Final

October 31, 1985

IFK Göteborg	2–4	Örgryte IS

Nya Ullevi, Gothenburg
November 3, 1985

Örgryte IS	2–3	IFK Göteborg

Nya Ullevi, Gothenburg

=== Allsvenskan promotion play-off 1985 ===
October 17, 1985

GAIS	0–0	Djurgårdens IF

?, Gothenburg
October 27, 1985

Djurgårdens IF	0–0 1–1 (aet) 4–2 (apen)	GAIS

Stockholms Stadion, Stockholm

October 19, 1985

Västerås SK	2–5	IF Elfsborg

?, Västerås
October 26, 1985

IF Elfsborg	4–0	Västerås SK

Ryavallen, Borås

=== Division 2 Norra 1985 ===

	Team	Pld	W	D	L	GF		GA	GD	Pts
1	Djurgårdens IF	26	16	8	2	50	–	20	+30	40
2	Västerås SK	26	18	2	6	64	–	21	+43	38
3	Gefle IF	26	14	7	5	41	–	23	+18	35
4	Örebro SK	26	9	10	7	38	–	33	+5	28
5	IFK Eskilstuna	26	10	8	8	33	–	38	-5	28
6	Luleå FF	26	10	7	9	47	–	39	+8	27
7	IF Brommapojkarna	26	9	8	9	36	–	33	+3	26
8	Sandvikens IF	26	9	8	9	30	–	31	-1	26
9	Vasalunds IF	26	8	9	9	43	–	36	+7	25
10	IFK Västerås	26	9	7	10	32	–	31	+1	25
11	Ope IF	26	8	7	11	25	–	38	-13	23
12	Karlslunds IF	26	8	5	13	24	–	41	-17	21
13	Tyresö FF	26	6	7	13	25	–	42	-17	19
14	Falu BS	26	0	3	23	12	–	74	-62	3

=== Division 2 Södra 1985 ===
	Team	Pld	W	D	L	GF		GA	GD	Pts
1	IF Elfsborg	26	17	7	2	54	–	14	+40	41
2	GAIS	26	16	5	5	58	–	26	+32	37
3	Åtvidabergs FF	26	15	5	6	51	–	27	+24	35
4	Helsingborgs IF	26	10	9	7	37	–	32	+5	29
5	Norrby IF	26	11	6	9	32	–	39	-7	28
6	Västra Frölunda IF	26	9	8	9	38	–	30	+8	26
7	Kalmar AIK	26	7	12	7	40	–	34	+6	26
8	BK Häcken	26	11	4	11	50	–	46	+4	26
9	Markaryds IF	26	7	10	9	29	–	39	-10	24
10	Degerfors IF	26	8	7	11	40	–	43	-3	23
11	Myresjö IF	26	8	6	12	42	–	53	-11	22
12	Jönköpings Södra IF	26	7	6	13	32	–	38	-6	20
13	IFK Malmö	26	4	8	14	17	–	43	-26	16
14	IS Halmia	26	3	5	18	21	–	77	-56	11

=== Division 2 promotion play-off 1985 ===
October 13, 1985

Skellefteå AIK	0–0	Jonsereds IF

?, ?
October 19, 1985

Jonsereds IF	0–1	Skellefteå AIK

?, ?

October 12, 1985

Enköpings SK	2–1	Spårvägens GoIF

?, ?
October 19, 1985

Spårvägens GoIF	1–1	Enköpings SK

?, ?

October 12, 1985

Linköpings FF	1–1	Landskrona BoIS

?, ?
October 20, 1985

Landskrona BoIS	1–1 3–2 (apen)	Linköpings FF

?, ?

October 12, 1985

Karlskrona AIF	0–0	IFK Sundsvall

?, ?
October 20, 1985

IFK Sundsvall	0–2	Karlskrona AIF

?, ?

October 12, 1985

Karlsta BK	0–1	Kirsebergs IF

?, ?
October 19, 1985

Kirsebergs IF	1–2 (ag)	Karlsta BK

?, ?

October 13, 1985

GIF Sundsvall	1–0	Skövde AIK

?, ?
October 19, 1985

Skövde AIK	3–2 (ag)	GIF Sundsvall

?, ?

=== Svenska Cupen 1984–85 ===
Final

June 19, 1985

AIK	1–1 1–1 (aet) 4–3 (apen)	Östers IF

Råsunda, Solna

== National team results ==
May 1, 1985
Friendly
№ 614

Israel	1–1	Sweden
Ohana 34'		Prytz 30'

Ramat Gan Stadium, Ramat Gan
Attendance: 6,727
Referee: Petrescu (Romania)

May 22, 1985
Friendly
№ 615

Sweden	1–0	Norway
Prytz 86' (p)

Nya Ullevi, Gothenburg
Attendance: 12,123
Referee: Lund Sørensen (Denmark)

June 5, 1985
1986 World Cup qualification
№ 616

Sweden	2–0	Czechoslovakia
Prytz 76' (p); Larsson 86'

Råsunda, Solna
Attendance: 33,981
Referee: Farrell (Ireland)

August 21, 1985
Friendly
№ 617

Sweden	1–0	Poland
Ravelli 74'

Malmö Stadion, Malmö
Attendance: 12,476
Referee: Halle (Norway)

September 11, 1985
Friendly
№ 618

Denmark	0–3	Sweden
		Prytz 31'; Corneliusson 68'; Magnusson 86'

Idrætsparken, Copenhagen
Attendance: 44,000
Referee: Haugen (Norway)

September 25, 1985
1986 World Cup qualification
№ 619

Sweden	2–2	West Germany
Corneliusson 63'; Magnusson 90'		Völler 23'; Herget 40'

Råsunda, Solna
Attendance: 39,157
Referee: Van Langenhove (Belgium)

October 16, 1985
1986 World Cup qualification
№ 620

Czechoslovakia	2–1	Sweden
Ravelli 41' (og); Vízek 66'		Corneliusson 6'

Stadion Evžena Rošického, Prague
Attendance: 6,889
Referee: Sandoz (Switzerland)

November 17, 1985
1986 World Cup qualification
№ 621

Malta	1–2	Sweden
Farrugia 65'		Prytz 2'; Strömberg 76'

National Stadium, Ta'Qali/Mdina
Attendance: 6,000
Referee: Namoglu (Turkey)
