= 1979 Allsvenskan =

55th season of Allsvenskan

Allsvenskan
- Season: 1979
- Champions: Halmstads BK
- Relegated: AIK; IS Halmia
- European Cup: Halmstads BK
- UEFA Cup: IFK Göteborg; IF Elfsborg
- Top goalscorer: Mats "Matte" Werner, Hammarby IF (14)
- Average attendance: 7,544

Statistics of Allsvenskan in season 1979.

== Overview ==
The league was contested by 14 teams, with Halmstads BK winning the championship.

== League table ==
Pos	Team	Pld	W	D	L	GF	GA	GD	Pts	Qualification or relegation
1	Halmstads BK (C)	26	12	12	2	38	21	+17	36	Qualification to European Cup first round
2	IFK Göteborg	26	13	9	4	44	24	+20	35	Qualification to UEFA Cup first round
3	IF Elfsborg	26	14	5	7	35	24	+11	33	Qualification to UEFA Cup first round
4	Malmö FF	26	12	8	6	30	24	+6	32	Qualification to Cup Winners' Cup first round (Note: Malmö FF qualified for the European Cup Winners' Cup as Svenska Cupen champions 1979–80.)
5	IFK Norrköping	26	11	9	6	44	28	+16	31	
6	Hammarby IF	26	11	6	9	46	36	+10	28	
7	Östers IF	26	9	10	7	32	28	+4	28	
8	Kalmar FF	26	8	8	10	42	39	+3	24	
9	IFK Sundsvall	26	8	7	11	31	41	−10	23	
10	Djurgårdens IF	26	7	8	11	28	35	−7	22	
11	Åtvidabergs FF	26	7	8	11	20	27	−7	22	
12	Landskrona BoIS	26	8	5	13	32	41	−9	21	
13	AIK (R)	26	5	10	11	24	35	−11	20	Relegation to Division 2
14	IS Halmia (R)	26	2	5	19	15	58	−43	9	Relegation to Division 2

Source: "Swedish Football Tables - List of final tables". RSSSF. 2011.
Rules for classification: 1) points; 2) goal difference; 3) number of goals scored.
(C) Champions; (R) Relegated

== Results ==
Home \ Away	AIK	DIF	HBK	HIF	IFE	IFKG	IFKN	IFKS	ISH	KFF	BOIS	MFF	ÅFF	ÖIF
AIK		1–1	0–3	1–1	0–1	1–3	2–2	0–2	2–0	2–2	0–0	1–1	4–0	1–1
Djurgårdens IF	0–0		1–1	0–2	0–1	0–0	1–0	3–2	5–2	2–1	2–1	0–1	0–0	2–0
Halmstads BK	2–0	4–1		1–1	1–0	2–0	1–0	2–2	3–2	3–1	2–1	1–1	0–0	0–0
Hammarby IF	2–1	5–2	2–0		1–2	2–3	1–3	6–1	0–1	2–2	5–2	0–1	0–0	1–0
IF Elfsborg	0–1	0–1	1–0	1–0		2–1	2–3	2–1	1–0	2–2	2–1	3–1	0–0	3–0
IFK Göteborg	3–1	2–1	1–1	1–2	1–2		2–2	1–1	2–0	4–0	2–0	1–1	2–1	2–2
IFK Norrköping	3–0	1–0	1–1	5–0	1–1	1–3		4–2	1–1	2–0	4–1	1–0	2–1	1–1
IFK Sundsvall	0–1	1–1	1–1	0–1	3–1	1–1	3–1		1–0	1–1	2–3	1–2	2–0	1–0
IS Halmia	0–1	1–1	0–2	2–2	1–4	0–1	0–4	0–1		2–2	1–0	1–1	0–1	0–2
Kalmar FF	4–3	2–0	1–2	3–2	0–0	1–2	1–1	3–0	2–0		1–1	0–1	3–1	6–0
Landskrona BoIS	1–0	2–1	1–1	0–2	0–3	0–0	0–0	3–0	9–1	2–1		0–1	1–0	2–1
Malmö FF	0–0	1–0	2–2	1–0	3–0	0–4	1–1	3–0	3–0	0–3	3–1		2–0	0–2
Åtvidabergs FF	1–1	2–1	1–2	1–4	1–0	0–0	1–0	0–1	3–0	2–0	3–0	0–0		1–1
Östers IF	2–0	2–2	0–0	2–2	1–1	0–2	2–0	1–1	4–0	2–0	3–0	2–0	1–0	

Legend: Blue = home team win; Yellow = draw; Red = away team win.

== Attendances ==
No.	Club	Average	Highest
1	IFK Göteborg	15,622	30,078
2	Hammarby IF	11,422	20,733
3	IF Elfsborg	10,020	19,170
4	Halmstads BK	9,846	16,025
5	Djurgårdens IF	8,290	23,378
6	Malmö FF	8,168	13,326
7	IFK Norrköping	7,772	16,017
8	AIK	7,403	20,179
9	IFK Sundsvall	5,556	9,636
10	Kalmar FF	4,950	7,122
11	Östers IF	4,917	9,190
12	Landskrona BoIS	4,583	11,150
13	IS Halmia	3,870	13,924
14	Åtvidabergs FF	3,421	7,035

== Sources ==
- "Swedish Football Tables - List of final tables". RSSSF. 2011.
