= Ture Isberg =

Swedish footballer

Personal information
- Full name: Ture Isberg
- Date of birth: 23 April 1900
- Date of death: 3 November 1989 (aged 89)
- Position: Forward

Senior career*
Years	Team	Apps	(Gls)
1924–1932	Malmö FF	104	(31)
- * Club domestic league appearances and goals

Ture Isberg (23 April 1900 – 3 November 1989) was a Swedish footballer who played as a forward.
