= 1970 Allsvenskan =

46th season of Allsvenskan

Allsvenskan
- Season: 1970
- Champions: Malmö FF
- Relegated: IFK Göteborg; GAIS
- European Cup: Malmö FF
- UEFA Cup: Djurgårdens IF; IF Elfsborg
- Top goalscorer: Bo Larsson, Malmö FF (16)
- Average attendance: 9,226

Statistics of Allsvenskan in season 1970.

== Overview ==
- The league was contested by 12 teams, with Malmö FF winning the championship.
- In August, young Hammarby IF supporters began to stand and sing songs with own-written lyrics. This is seen as the beginning of modern organized soccer chants in Sweden. Inspirationens came from England through Tipsextra in SVT.
- Örebro SK defeated defending champions IFK Göteborg, 1-0, at home at Eyravallen in the final game, leading to IFK Göteborg being relegated. Riots began when IFK Göteborg supporters stormed the pitch in an attempt to tear down the goal in order to make sure the game would be replayed. The game was cancelled with circa eight minutes left, and IFK Göteborg was relegated.

== League table ==
Pos	Team	Pld	W	D	L	GF	GA	GD	Pts	Qualification or relegation
1	Malmö FF (C)	22	11	7	4	30	20	+10	29	Qualification to European Cup first round
2	Åtvidabergs FF	22	12	4	6	40	29	+11	28	Qualification to Cup Winners' Cup first round (Note: Åtvidaberg qualified for the European Cup Winners' Cup as Svenska Cupen champions 1970–71.)
3	Djurgårdens IF	22	8	8	6	35	29	+6	24	Qualification to UEFA Cup first round
4	IF Elfsborg	22	8	8	6	30	31	−1	24	Qualification to UEFA Cup first round
5	Hammarby IF	22	8	7	7	33	32	+1	23	
6	IFK Norrköping	22	7	8	7	33	22	+11	22	
7	Östers IF	22	7	7	8	29	30	−1	21	
8	Örebro SK	22	9	2	11	31	24	+7	20	
9	AIK	22	7	6	9	17	24	−7	20	
10	Örgryte IS	22	6	8	8	25	35	−10	20	
11	IFK Göteborg (R)	22	6	5	11	28	36	−8	17	Relegation to Division 2
12	GAIS (R)	22	5	6	11	27	46	−19	16	Relegation to Division 2

Rules for classification: 1) points; 2) goal difference; 3) number of goals scored.
(C) Champions; (R) Relegated

== Results ==
Home \ Away	AIK	DIF	GAIS	HIF	IFE	IFKG	IFKN	MFF	ÅFF	ÖSK	ÖIS	ÖIF
AIK		1–0	1–2	1–1	3–0	0–0	2–1	0–0	0–0	0–2	0–1	0–0
Djurgårdens IF	4–1		2–3	1–1	2–1	3–3	1–3	3–0	1–2	2–1	2–2	2–1
GAIS	0–0	1–3		2–2	1–1	4–1	3–2	0–1	2–3	2–0	0–3	1–1
Hammarby IF	2–0	0–2	2–0		0–2	3–1	2–1	1–1	3–1	3–1	1–1	3–1
IF Elfsborg	3–0	1–1	4–2	1–1		1–0	0–0	4–0	1–2	1–0	0–0	2–2
IFK Göteborg	0–2	1–0	4–1	5–1	1–3		1–1	1–2	1–0	2–0	1–1	0–2
IFK Norrköping	1–2	0–0	3–1	1–1	6–0	1–1		1–1	1–1	3–2	5–0	0–1
Malmö FF	5–1	0–0	1–1	2–0	3–0	2–0	1–0		3–1	1–0	2–0	2–4
Åtvidabergs FF	0–2	3–1	4–1	1–0	3–0	5–2	0–2	0–2		1–0	5–1	3–3
Örebro SK	1–0	2–2	5–0	5–2	0–1	1–0	0–1	1–1	0–1		3–1	2–0
Örgryte IS	0–1	1–1	0–0	1–4	2–2	2–1	2–0	2–0	1–1	0–3		2–3
Östers IF	1–0	1–2	3–0	1–0	2–2	1–2	0–0	0–0	2–3	0–2	0–2	

Legend: Blue = home team win; Yellow = draw; Red = away team win.

== Attendances ==
#	Club	Average	Highest
1	Malmö FF	13,036	21,688
2	Hammarby IF	12,457	32,229
3	IFK Göteborg	11,363	17,875
4	Djurgårdens IF	10,092	25,665
5	IF Elfsborg	9,098	15,158
6	Örgryte IS	9,006	16,301
7	IFK Norrköping	8,906	17,632
8	GAIS	8,708	17,651
9	AIK	8,643	20,388
10	Östers IF	7,914	13,244
11	Örebro SK	6,476	13,886
12	Åtvidabergs FF	4,865	7,988
