= 1920–21 Division 2 Sydsvenska Serien =

Swedish football league season

Division 2 Sydsvenska Serien 1920–21 was part of the 1920–21 Swedish football season.

== League table ==
| Pos | Team | Pld | W | D | L | GF | GA | GD | Pts | Promotion |
|---|---|---|---|---|---|---|---|---|---|---|
| 1 | Malmö FF (C, P) | 10 | 7 | 1 | 2 | 31 | 20 | +11 | 15 | Promotion to Division 1 Svenska Serien Västra |
| 2 | Landskrona BoIS | 10 | 6 | 1 | 3 | 28 | 19 | +9 | 13 | |
| 3 | IS Halmia | 10 | 4 | 1 | 5 | 19 | 21 | −2 | 9 | |
| 4 | Jönköpings IS | 10 | 4 | 0 | 6 | 18 | 28 | −10 | 8 | |
| 5 | Husqvarna IF | 10 | 4 | 0 | 6 | 18 | 29 | −11 | 8 | |
| 6 | IFK Hälsingborg | 10 | 3 | 1 | 6 | 23 | 20 | +3 | 7 | |

Rules for classification: 1) points; 2) goal difference; 3) number of goals scored.
(C) Champions; (P) Promoted
