= 1938–39 Allsvenskan =

15th season of Allsvenskan

Allsvenskan
- Season: 1938–39
- Champions: IF Elfsborg
- Relegated: Degerfors IF; Hallstahammars SK
- Top goalscorer: Erik Persson, AIK; Ove Andersson, Malmö FF; Yngve Lindgren, Örgryte IS (16)
- Average attendance: 6,410

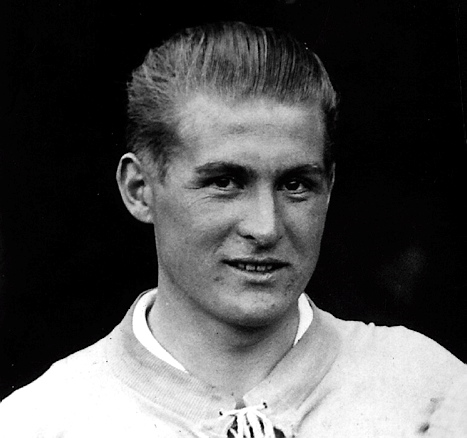
Ove Andersson, MFF's first Allsvenskan topscorer (1938/39)

Statistics of Allsvenskan in season 1938/1939.

== Overview ==
The league was contested by 12 teams, with IF Elfsborg winning the championship.

== League table ==
Pos	Team	Pld	W	D	L	GF	GA	GD	Pts	Qualification or relegation
1	IF Elfsborg (C)	22	15	4	3	65	26	+39	34	
2	AIK	22	11	3	8	49	34	+15	25	
3	Malmö FF	22	9	7	6	30	29	+1	25	
4	Landskrona BoIS	22	9	7	6	29	36	−7	25	
5	Gårda	22	7	8	7	38	37	+1	22	
6	IK Brage	22	6	9	7	33	38	−5	21	
7	IK Sleipner	22	8	4	10	43	44	−1	20	
8	Sandvikens IF	22	9	2	11	34	36	−2	20	
9	Hälsingborgs IF	22	7	6	9	29	33	−4	20	
10	Örgryte IS	22	8	3	11	39	43	−4	19	
11	Degerfors IF (R)	22	9	1	12	43	52	−9	19	Relegation to Division 2
12	Hallstahammar (R)	22	4	6	12	27	51	−24	14	Relegation to Division 2

Rules for classification: 1) points; 2) goal difference; 3) number of goals scored.
(C) Champions; (R) Relegated

== Results ==
Home \ Away	AIK	DIF	GBK	HSK	HIF	IFE	IKB	IKS	BOIS	MFF	SIF	ÖIS
AIK		2–3	3–2	2–2	2–3	4–3	0–0	2–0	7–0	2–0	3–0	4–3
Degerfors IF	0–4		1–2	3–1	5–1	1–4	1–2	1–3	5–0	3–0	4–3	4–3
Gårda BK	0–1	2–1		3–3	2–2	0–5	2–2	4–1	1–2	2–2	3–2	3–0
Hallstahammars SK	3–1	1–2	1–1		1–0	1–7	3–0	2–2	1–3	1–1	2–1	1–6
Hälsingborgs IF	1–1	3–1	0–2	2–0		1–2	0–0	4–1	0–0	2–1	0–1	5–0
IF Elfsborg	2–1	10–1	1–1	4–1	3–2		4–1	3–3	4–1	1–2	2–1	1–0
IK Brage	3–1	2–2	3–2	1–1	1–2	0–1		3–2	1–1	0–1	3–1	2–2
IK Sleipner	2–1	2–4	3–0	4–2	0–0	2–4	6–1		1–1	2–3	2–1	3–0
Landskrona BoIS	0–4	2–0	2–1	2–0	1–1	3–1	1–1	0–2		0–0	4–0	3–2
Malmö FF	2–3	2–0	1–1	2–0	3–0	0–0	1–4	2–0	1–1		1–1	2–0
Sandvikens IF	2–0	2–1	1–4	2–0	4–0	0–0	1–0	3–1	1–2	1–2		2–0
Örgryte IS	3–1	1–0	0–0	2–0	2–0	0–3	3–3	3–1	2–0	5–1	2–4	

Legend: Blue = home team win; Yellow = draw; Red = away team win.

== Attendances ==
#	Club	Average attendance	Highest attendance
1	AIK	12,609	20,212
2	Malmö FF	8,999	11,960
3	Gårda BK	6,878	12,865
4	IK Sleipner	6,716	9,358
5	Örgryte IS	6,681	12,654
6	IF Elfsborg	6,672	11,702
7	Hälsingborgs IF	6,293	9,701
8	IK Brage	5,847	11,923
9	Degerfors IF	5,582	7,410
10	Sandvikens IF	3,996	10,063
11	Hallstahammars SK	3,769	6,000
12	Landskrona BoIS	3,355	8,167
