= Yngve Lindgren =

Swedish footballer (born 1912)

Personal information
- Full name: Yngve Lindgren
- Date of birth: 26 April 1912
- Date of death: 9 April 1990 (aged 77)

Senior career*
Years	Team	Apps	(Gls)
1932–1940	Örgryte IS	69	(36)
- * Club domestic league appearances and goals

Yngve Lindgren, born 26 April 1912, dead 9 April 1990, was a Swedish footballer. He played for Örgryte IS.
