= 1943–44 Allsvenskan =

20th season of Allsvenskan

Allsvenskan
- Season: 1943–44
- Champions: Malmö FF
- Relegated: IK Brage; Sandvikens IF
- Top goalscorer: Leif Larsson, IFK Göteborg (19)
- Average attendance: 6,387

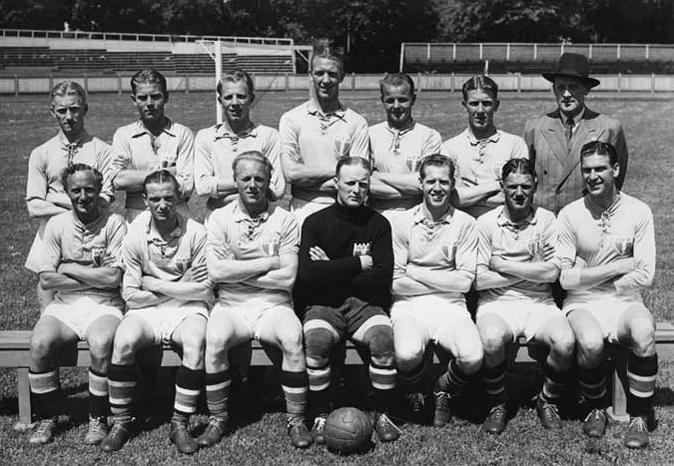
Malmö FF - champions

Statistics of Allsvenskan in season 1943/1944.

== Overview ==
The league was contested by 12 teams, with Malmö FF winning the championship.

== League table ==
| Pos | Team | Pld | W | D | L | GF | GA | GD | Pts | Qualification or relegation |
|---|---|---|---|---|---|---|---|---|---|---|
| 1 | Malmö FF (C) | 22 | 17 | 3 | 2 | 54 | 22 | +32 | 37 | |
| 2 | IF Elfsborg | 22 | 15 | 2 | 5 | 63 | 29 | +34 | 32 | |
| 3 | AIK | 22 | 16 | 0 | 6 | 54 | 25 | +29 | 32 | |
| 4 | IFK Norrköping | 22 | 13 | 4 | 5 | 53 | 31 | +22 | 30 | |
| 5 | IFK Göteborg | 22 | 12 | 3 | 7 | 69 | 42 | +27 | 27 | |
| 6 | Degerfors IF | 22 | 9 | 7 | 6 | 42 | 31 | +11 | 25 | |
| 7 | IS Halmia | 22 | 10 | 1 | 11 | 47 | 56 | −9 | 21 | |
| 8 | GAIS | 22 | 5 | 5 | 12 | 20 | 48 | −28 | 15 | |
| 9 | Halmstads BK | 22 | 6 | 2 | 14 | 32 | 53 | −21 | 14 | |
| 10 | Hälsingborgs IF | 22 | 1 | 11 | 10 | 26 | 50 | −24 | 13 | |
| 11 | IK Brage (R) | 22 | 4 | 3 | 15 | 22 | 59 | −37 | 11 | Relegation to Division 2 |
| 12 | Sandvikens IF (R) | 22 | 1 | 5 | 16 | 23 | 59 | −36 | 7 | Relegation to Division 2 |

Rules for classification: 1) points; 2) goal difference; 3) number of goals scored.
(C) Champions; (R) Relegated

== Results ==
| Home \ Away | AIK | DIF | GAIS | HBK | HIF | IFE | IFKG | IFKN | IKB | ISH | MFF | SIF |
|---|---|---|---|---|---|---|---|---|---|---|---|---|
| AIK | | 3–2 | 2–0 | 1–0 | 2–0 | 3–4 | 4–2 | 0–1 | 5–0 | 3–2 | 1–2 | 4–0 |
| Degerfors IF | 0–0 | | 5–1 | 2–2 | 1–1 | 2–0 | 1–2 | 2–2 | 5–1 | 1–3 | 3–0 | 3–2 |
| GAIS | 0–2 | 2–2 | | 2–1 | 2–0 | 0–2 | 2–5 | 0–3 | 2–1 | 2–1 | 0–4 | 1–0 |
| Halmstads BK | 1–4 | 0–4 | 1–0 | | 2–1 | 0–2 | 2–6 | 2–2 | 2–0 | 1–3 | 0–2 | 4–1 |
| Hälsingborgs IF | 0–1 | 0–2 | 2–2 | 2–1 | | 2–2 | 0–2 | 3–3 | 1–1 | 1–1 | 2–2 | 1–1 |
| IF Elfsborg | 4–1 | 1–0 | 1–1 | 2–1 | 6–1 | | 5–1 | 5–1 | 5–2 | 5–1 | 1–2 | 2–0 |
| IFK Göteborg | 1–3 | 3–3 | 6–1 | 5–2 | 6–0 | 3–2 | | 2–3 | 5–0 | 0–1 | 1–1 | 5–2 |
| IFK Norrköping | 1–2 | 2–2 | 3–0 | 3–1 | 3–2 | 5–0 | 2–0 | | 5–0 | 4–1 | 0–2 | 2–1 |
| IK Brage | 1–2 | 0–1 | 1–1 | 1–6 | 2–2 | 0–3 | 1–3 | 2–1 | | 1–0 | 0–1 | 3–2 |
| IS Halmia | 1–5 | 2–0 | 4–1 | 2–1 | 5–2 | 2–4 | 3–9 | 2–5 | 4–1 | | 3–1 | 3–2 |
| Malmö FF | 3–2 | 2–0 | 2–0 | 7–0 | 2–2 | 2–1 | 3–1 | 2–1 | 2–0 | 3–1 | | 3–1 |
| Sandvikens IF | 0–4 | 1–1 | 0–0 | 1–2 | 1–1 | 0–6 | 1–1 | 0–1 | 1–4 | 4–2 | 2–6 | |

Legend: Blue = home team win; Yellow = draw; Red = away team win.

== Attendances ==
| # | Club | Average | Highest |
|---|---|---|---|
| 1 | AIK | 14,234 | 35,420 |
| 2 | IFK Göteborg | 11,443 | 20,849 |
| 3 | Malmö FF | 11,353 | 14,007 |
| 4 | GAIS | 5,994 | 9,468 |
| 5 | IFK Norrköping | 5,956 | 9,744 |
| 6 | IF Elfsborg | 5,751 | 9,452 |
| 7 | Hälsingborgs IF | 5,576 | 9,556 |
| 8 | Halmstads BK | 3,863 | 6,553 |
| 9 | IS Halmia | 3,712 | 6,379 |
| 10 | IK Brage | 3,247 | 4,532 |
| 11 | Degerfors IF | 2,880 | 4,852 |
| 12 | Sandvikens IF | 1,609 | 2,422 |

== Sources ==
- "Swedish Football Tables - List of final tables". RSSSF. 2011.
