= Hallstahammars SK =

Swedish football club

- Full name: Hallstahammars Sportklubb
- Founded: 1906
- Ground: Trollebo IP; Hallstahammar; Sweden
- Chairman: Anders Gustavsson
- League: Division 4 Västmanland
- 2010: Division 4 Västmanland, 10th
- Website: http://www.hsk-fotboll.nu/
Home colours	Away colours

Hallstahammars SK is a Swedish sports club located in Hallstahammar in Västmanland County.

== Background ==
Since their foundation in 1906 Hallstahammars Sportklubb has participated in the upper and lower divisions of the Swedish football league system. The club played in Allsvenskan during the 1931–32 and 1938–39 seasons. Hallstahammars SK currently plays in Division 3 Mellersta Svealand which is the fifth tier of Swedish football. They play their home matches at the Trollebo IP in Hallstahammar.

Hallstahammars SK are affiliated to the Västmanlands Fotbollförbund.

The club also has or has had active sections for bandy, handball and ice hockey.

== Season to season ==
In their early history Hallstahammars SK competed in the following divisions:

Season	Level	Division	Section	Position	Movements
1924–25	Tier 2	Division 2	Mellansvenska	2nd	
1925–26	Tier 2	Division 2	Mellansvenska	2nd	
1926–27	Tier 2	Division 2	Mellansvenska	4th	
1927–28	Tier 2	Division 2	Mellansvenska	1st	Promotion Playoffs
1928–29	Tier 2	Division 2	Norra	2nd	
1929–30	Tier 2	Division 2	Norra	5th	
1930–31	Tier 2	Division 2	Norra	1st	Promoted
1931–32	Tier 1	Allsvenskan		12th	Relegated
1932–33	Tier 2	Division 2	Norra	3rd	
1933–34	Tier 2	Division 2	Norra	7th	
1934–35	Tier 2	Division 2	Norra	4th	
1935–36	Tier 2	Division 2	Norra	1st	Promotion Playoffs
1936–37	Tier 2	Division 2	Norra	5th	
1937–38	Tier 2	Division 2	Östra	1st	Promotion Playoffs – Promoted
1938–39	Tier 1	Allsvenskan		12th	Relegated
1939–40	Tier 2	Division 2	Östra	5th	
1940–41	Tier 2	Division 2	Östra	4th	
1941–42	Tier 2	Division 2	Östra	5th	
1942–43	Tier 2	Division 2	Östra	5th	
1943–44	Tier 2	Division 2	Norra	8th	
1944–45	Tier 2	Division 2	Norra	9th	Relegated
1945–46	Tier 3	Division 3	Centralserien Norra, Västmanland	1st	Promotion Playoffs
1946–47	Tier 3	Division 3	Centralserien Norra	2nd	Relegation Playoffs
1947–48	Tier 3	Division 3	Norra	8th	Relegated

In recent seasons Hallstahammars SK have competed in the following divisions:

Season	Level	Division	Section	Position	Movements
1993	Tier 5	Division 4	Västmanland	8th	
1994	Tier 5	Division 4	Västmanland	4th	
1995	Tier 5	Division 4	Västmanland	3rd	
1996	Tier 5	Division 4	Västmanland	5th	
1997	Tier 5	Division 4	Västmanland	5th	
1998	Tier 5	Division 4	Västmanland	9th	
1999	Tier 5	Division 4	Västmanland	8th	
2000	Tier 5	Division 4	Västmanland	9th	
2001	Tier 5	Division 4	Västmanland	9th	
2002	Tier 5	Division 4	Västmanland	9th	
2003	Tier 5	Division 4	Västmanland	6th	
2004	Tier 5	Division 4	Västmanland	11th	Relegated
2005	Tier 6	Division 5	Västmanland	2nd	Promoted
2006*	Tier 6	Division 4	Västmanland	3rd	
2007	Tier 6	Division 4	Västmanland	3rd	
2008	Tier 6	Division 4	Västmanland	3rd	
2009	Tier 6	Division 4	Västmanland	9th	
2010	Tier 6	Division 4	Västmanland	10th	

* League restructuring in 2006 resulted in a new division being created at Tier 3 and subsequent divisions dropping a level.

== Attendances ==
In recent seasons Hallstahammars SK have had the following average attendances:

Season	Average Attendance	Division / Section	Level
2008	Not available	Div 4 Västmanland	Tier 6
2009	97	Div 4 Västmanland	Tier 6
2010	64	Div 4 Västmanland	Tier 6

* Attendances are provided in the Publikliga sections of the Svenska Fotbollförbundet website.
