= Patrick Andersson (footballer, born 1970) =

Swedish footballer

Personal information
- Full name: Patrick Andersson
- Date of birth: 16 July 1970 (age 56)
- Position: Midfielder

Senior career*
Years	Team	Apps	(Gls)
1990–1993	Malmö FF	56	(10)
- * Club domestic league appearances and goals

Patrick Andersson (born 16 July 1970) is a Swedish former footballer who played as a midfielder.
