= 1932–33 Division 2 (Swedish football) =

Swedish League Division 2
- Season: 1932–33
- Champions: Gefle IF; IFK Norrköping; Krokslätts FF; Halmstads BK
- Promoted: Gefle IF; Halmstads BK
- Relegated: Sandvikens AIK; Örebro IK; Westermalms IF; IK City; Majornas IK; Degerfors IF; Kalmar AIK; IFK Karlshamn

Statistics of Swedish football Division 2 for the 1932–33 season.

== League standings ==
=== Division 2 Norra 1932–33 ===
Teams from a large part of northern Sweden, approximately above the province of Medelpad, were not allowed to play in the national league system until the 1953–54 season, and a championship was instead played to decide the best team in Norrland.

Pos	Team	Pld	W	D	L	GF	GA	GD	Pts	Qualification or relegation
1	Gefle IF	18	13	2	3	65	24	+41	28	Playoffs for promotion to Allsvenskan
2	IK Brage	18	13	1	4	58	28	+30	27	
3	Hallstahammars SK	18	8	4	6	31	32	−1	20 (Note: Tie breaker is goal average.)	
4	Surahammars IF	18	7	6	5	26	27	−1	20	
5	IFK Kumla	18	8	3	7	32	34	−2	19	
6	IFK Grängesberg	18	6	2	10	37	51	−14	14	
7	Brynäs IF	18	6	2	10	22	49	−27	14	
8	IFK Västerås	18	5	3	10	32	36	−4	13	
9	Sandvikens AIK	18	6	1	11	26	45	−19	13	Relegated to Division 3
10	Örebro IK	18	4	4	10	31	34	−3	12	Relegated to Division 3

=== Division 2 Östra 1932–33 ===
Pos	Team	Pld	W	D	L	GF	GA	GD	Pts	Qualification or relegation
1	IFK Norrköping	18	12	2	4	63	29	+34	26	Playoffs for promotion to Allsvenskan
2	Hammarby IF	18	10	5	3	45	25	+20	25	
3	Djurgårdens IF	18	9	6	3	38	29	+9	24	
4	Åtvidabergs IF	18	7	3	8	42	47	−5	17 (Note: Tie breaker is goal average.)	
5	Mjölby AI	18	6	5	7	38	49	−11	17	
6	Motala AIF	18	7	2	9	42	37	+5	16	
7	Reymersholms IK	18	5	6	7	28	42	−14	16	
8	BK Derby	18	5	5	8	29	38	−9	15	
9	Westermalms IF	18	5	3	10	36	41	−5	13	Relegated to Division 3
10	IK City	18	3	5	10	24	48	−24	11	Relegated to Division 3

=== Division 2 Västra 1932–33 ===
Pos	Team	Pld	W	D	L	GF	GA	GD	Pts	Qualification or relegation
1	Krokslätts FF	18	13	2	3	59	33	+26	28	Playoffs for promotion to Allsvenskan
2	Jonsereds IF	18	11	2	5	48	31	+17	24	
3	Billingsfors IK	18	10	3	5	49	35	+14	23	
4	IFK Uddevalla	18	9	3	6	50	35	+15	21	
5	Fässbergs IF	18	8	3	7	47	40	+7	19	
6	Surte IS	18	8	2	8	39	46	−7	18	
7	Slottsbrons IF	18	6	4	8	34	41	−7	16	
8	Karlskoga IF	18	5	4	9	25	33	−8	14	
9	Majornas IK	18	3	3	12	23	46	−23	9	Relegated to Division 3
10	Degerfors IF	18	4	0	14	29	63	−34	8	Relegated to Division 3

=== Division 2 Södra 1932–33 ===
Pos	Team	Pld	W	D	L	GF	GA	GD	Pts	Qualification or relegation
1	Halmstads BK	18	14	1	3	56	26	+30	29	Playoffs for promotion to Allsvenskan
2	BK Drott	18	11	3	4	49	32	+17	25	
3	IFK Malmö	18	9	4	5	57	47	+10	22	
4	Lunds BK	18	10	1	7	62	42	+20	21 (Note: Tie breaker is goal average.)	
5	Stattena IF	18	8	5	5	39	41	−2	21	
6	Kalmar FF	18	5	5	8	45	45	0	15	
7	Malmö BI	18	6	3	9	33	43	−10	15	
8	Höganäs BK	18	4	5	9	33	45	−12	13	
9	Kalmar AIK	18	5	1	12	25	46	−21	11	Relegated to Division 3
10	IFK Karlshamn	18	2	4	12	27	65	−38	8	Relegated to Division 3
