= 1970 in Swedish football =

The 1970 season in Swedish football, starting April 1970 and ending November 1970:

== Honours ==
=== Official titles ===
Title	Team	Reason
Swedish Champions 1970	Malmö FF	Winners of Allsvenskan
Swedish Cup Champions 1969–1970	Åtvidabergs FF	Winners of Svenska Cupen
