= 1923–24 Division 2 Sydsvenska Serien =

Swedish football league season

Division 2 Sydsvenska Serien 1923–24 was part of the 1923–24 Swedish football season.

== League table ==
	Team	Pld	W	D	L	GF		GA	GD	Pts
1	Varbergs GIF	10	7	2	1	23	–	9	+14	16
2	Malmö FF	10	6	3	1	20	–	7	+13	15
3	Halmstads BK	10	5	2	3	16	–	14	+2	12
4	IFK Hälsingborg	10	3	3	4	14	–	17	-3	9
5	IS Halmia	10	2	2	6	10	–	14	-4	6
6	Falkenbergs GIK	10	1	0	9	7	–	29	-22	2
