= 1922–23 Division 1 Svenska Serien Västra =

Swedish football league season

Division 1 Svenska Serien Västra 1922–23 was part of the 1922–23 Swedish football season.

== League table ==
	Team	Pld	W	D	L	GF		GA	GD	Pts
1	GAIS	10	5	3	2	15	–	10	+5	13
2	IFK Göteborg	10	5	2	3	18	–	9	+9	12
3	Örgryte IS	10	5	2	3	17	–	9	+8	12
4	Helsingborgs IF	10	4	4	2	14	–	9	+5	12
5	IFK Malmö	10	3	1	6	8	–	22	-14	7
6	Malmö FF	10	1	2	7	6	–	19	-13	4
