= Hans Håkansson =

Swedish footballer

Personal information
- Full name: Hans Håkansson
- Date of birth: 9 September 1908
- Place of birth: Malmö, Sweden
- Date of death: 1993 (aged 84–85)
- Place of death: Malmö, Sweden
- Position: Striker

Youth career
- –1927: Baltic

Senior career*
Years	Team	Apps	(Gls)
1927–1938	Malmö FF	203	(172)
1938–?	IFK Uddevalla		
- * Club domestic league appearances and goals

Hans Håkansson (9 September 1908, Malmö - 1993) was a Swedish footballer.

== Career ==
Håkansson played for Malmö FF for almost his entire career. He still holds the record for most goals scored in total with 341 goals. After his career in Malmö he moved to Uddevalla to work as a journalist and to play football. He was a prolific goalscorer, scoring 30 goals in 18 games during the 1935/36 season.
