= List of Malmö FF players (25–99 appearances) =

This list is about Malmö FF players with between 25 and 99 league appearances. For a list of all Malmö FF players with a Wikipedia article, see Category:Malmö FF players. For the current Malmö FF first-team squad, see First-team squad.

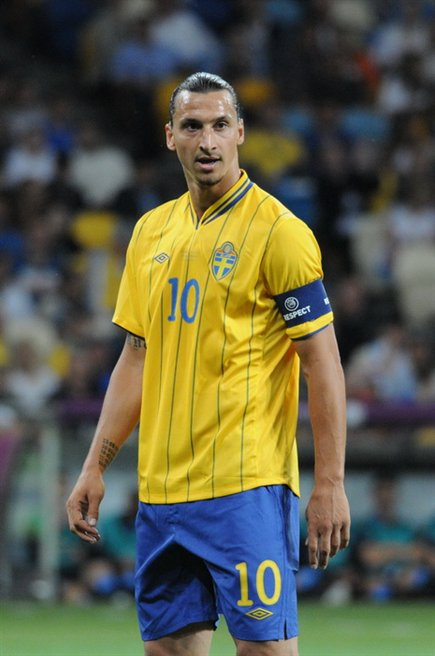
Zlatan Ibrahimović started his professional career at Malmö FF and made 40 appearances and scored 18 goals between 1999 and 2001.

Malmö Fotbollförening, also known simply as Malmö FF, is a Swedish professional association football club based in Malmö. The club is affiliated with Skånes Fotbollförbund (The Scanian Football Association), and plays its home games at Stadion. Formed on 24 February 1910, Malmö FF is the most successful club in Sweden in terms of trophies won. The club have won the most league titles of any Swedish club with twenty-one, a joint record eighteen Swedish championship titles and a record fourteen national cup titles. (Note: The title of "Swedish Champions" has been awarded to the winner of four different competitions over the years. Between 1896 and 1925 the title was awarded to the winner of Svenska Mästerskapet, a stand-alone cup tournament. No club were given the title between 1926 and 1930 even though the first-tier league Allsvenskan was played. In 1931 the title was reinstated and awarded to the winner of Allsvenskan. Between 1982 and 1990 a play-off in cup format was held at the end of the league season to decide the champions. After the play-off format in 1991 and 1992 the title was decided by the winner of Mästerskapsserien, an additional league after the end of Allsvenskan. Since the 1993 season the title has once again been awarded to the winner of Allsvenskan.) The team competes in Allsvenskan as of the 2015 season; this is Malmö FF's 15th consecutive season in the top flight, and their 80th overall. The main rivals of the club are Helsingborgs IF, IFK Göteborg and, historically, IFK Malmö.

Since playing their first competitive match, more than 480 players have made a league appearance for the club, many of whom have played between 25 and 99 matches. Former Allsvenskan top scorer Lars Larsson fell three short of 100 appearances for Malmö FF, scoring 52 goals in those matches. Pontus Jansson, Jimmy Durmaz, Daniel Majstorović, Jonas Thern, Mats Magnusson and Stefan Schwarz are among the former players who have been awarded league winners medals. Out of the players currently at the club, Swedish midfielder Simon Kroon is the closest player to 100 appearances; he has played 51 matches for Malmö FF.

As of 31 October 2015, a total of 155 players have played between 25 and 99 competitive matches for the club. Of those players, nine are still playing for the club and can add to their total.

== Key ==
General

- Appearances and goals are for first-team competitive league matches only, including Allsvenskan, Svenska Serien, Superettan and Division 2 matches. Substitute appearances included.
- Players are listed according to the total number of league games played, the player with the most goals scored is ranked higher if two or more players are tied.
- Positions are listed according to the tactical formations that were employed at the time. Thus the change in the names of defensive and midfield reflects the tactical evolution that occurred from the 1960s onwards. The year 1960 is used as a breaking point in this list for the use of names of defensive and midfield positions.

Table headers

- Nationality – If a player played international football, the country/countries he played for are shown. Otherwise, the player's nationality is given as their country of birth.
- Malmö FF career – The year of the player's first appearance for Malmö FF to the year of his last appearance.
- Appearances – The number of games played.
- Goals – The number of goals scored.

Positions key
Pre-1960		Post-1960	
GK	Goalkeeper		
FB	Full back	DF	Defender
HB	Half back	MF	Midfielder
FW	Forward		
U	Utility player		

Symbols key
Symbol	Meaning
‡	Malmö FF player in the 2015 season
*	Player holds club record(s)

== Players ==
Statistics correct as of match played 31 October 2015. (Note: For up to date statistics and referencing for current Malmö FF players on this list, see the statistics section at svenskfotboll.se: click on the relevant player's name there to verify that the statistics displayed on this list are correct. For players who are no longer part of the squad, but who played in Malmö FF after 2010, see www.soccerway.com, and enter the player's name into the search field in the upper-right-hand corner and press enter to verify the player's statistics.)

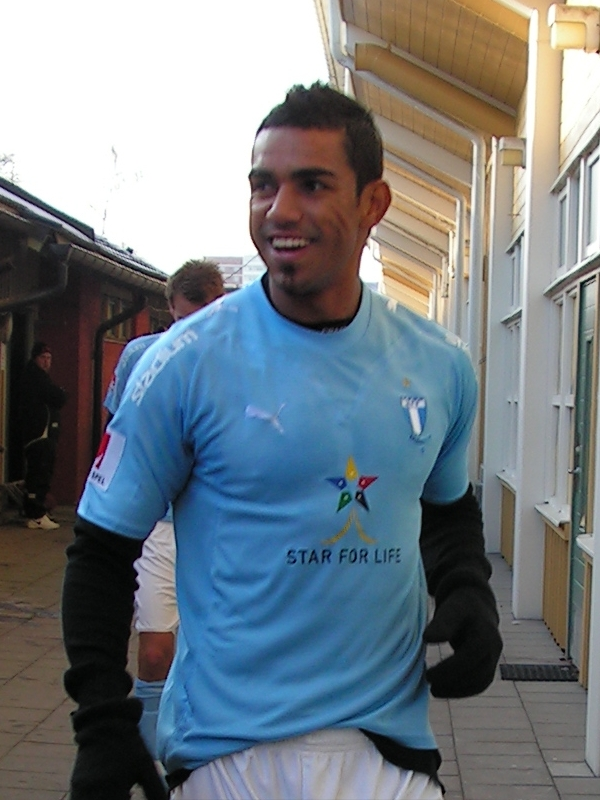
Wílton Figueiredo made 97 appearances and scored 19 goals for Malmö FF between 2009 and 2012.

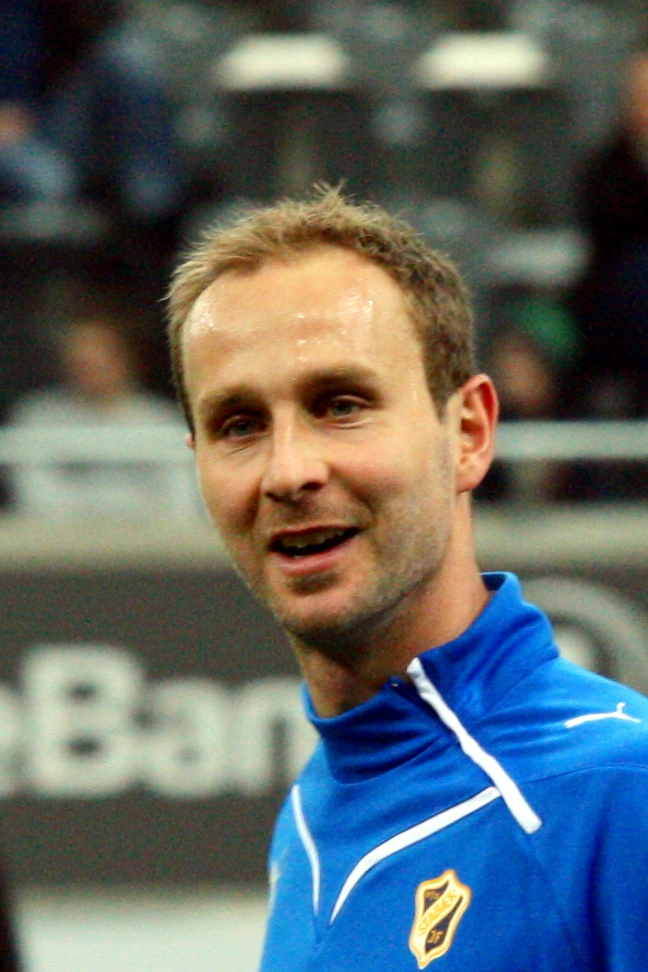
Jon Inge Høiland made 90 appearances and scored nine goals for Malmö FF between 2003 and 2007. He is famous for scoring the title winning goal of the 2004 season.

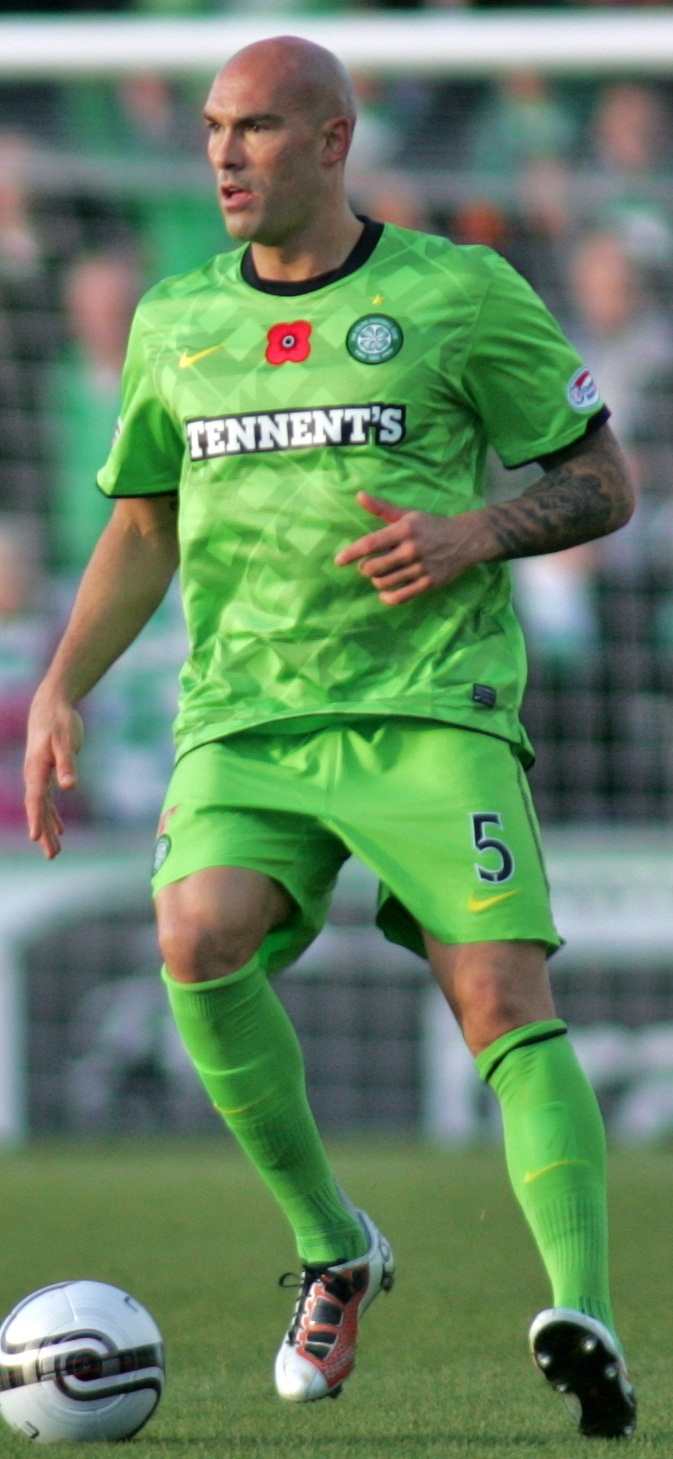
Daniel Majstorović made 86 appearances and scored nine goals for Malmö FF between 2001 and 2004.

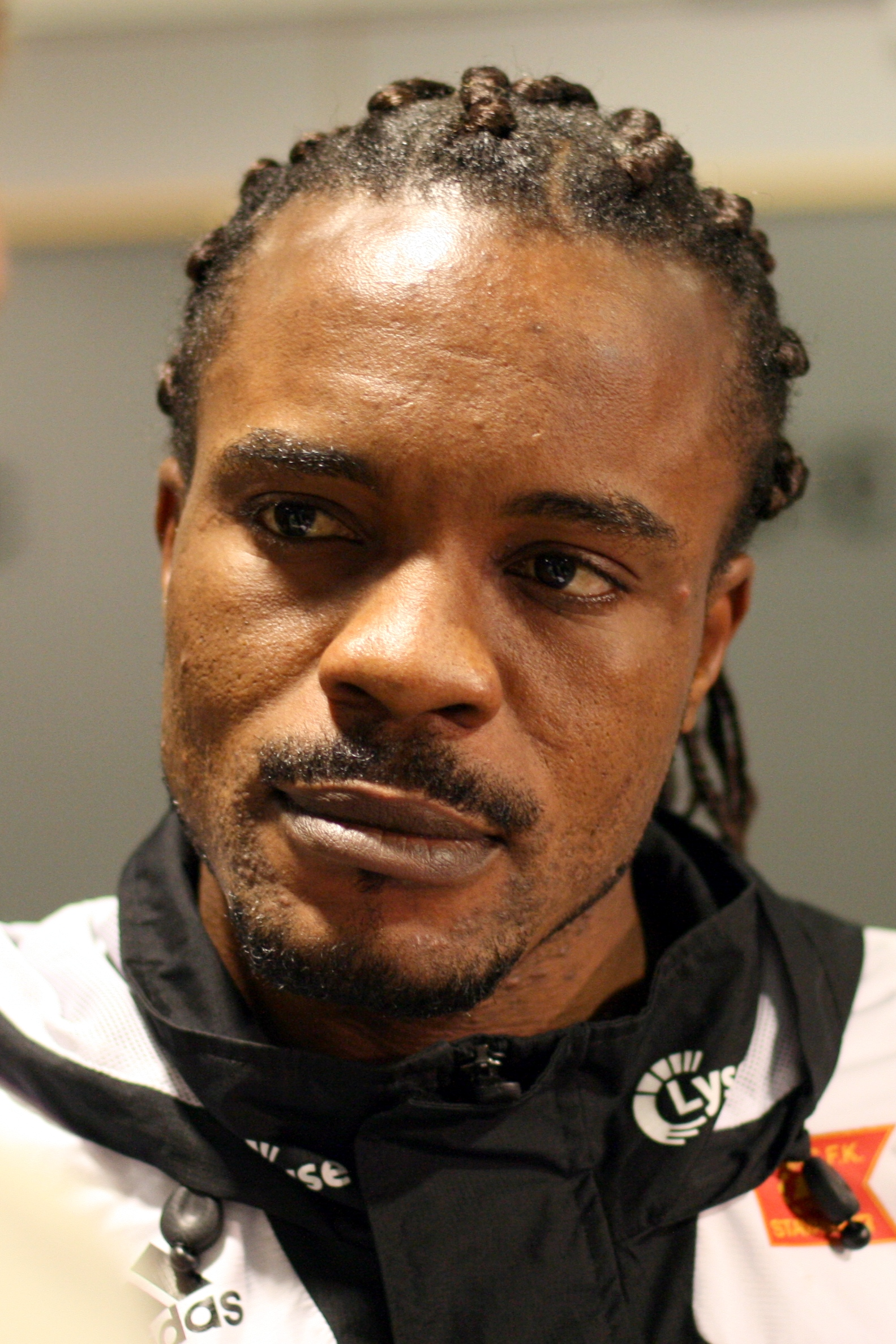
Peter Ijeh made 60 appearances and scored 38 goals for Malmö FF between 2001 and 2003.

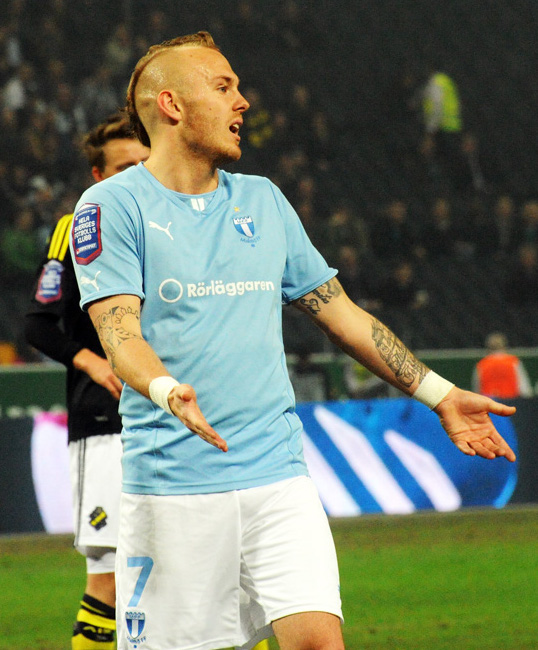
Magnus Eriksson made 60 appearances and scored 16 goals for Malmö FF between 2013 and 2014.

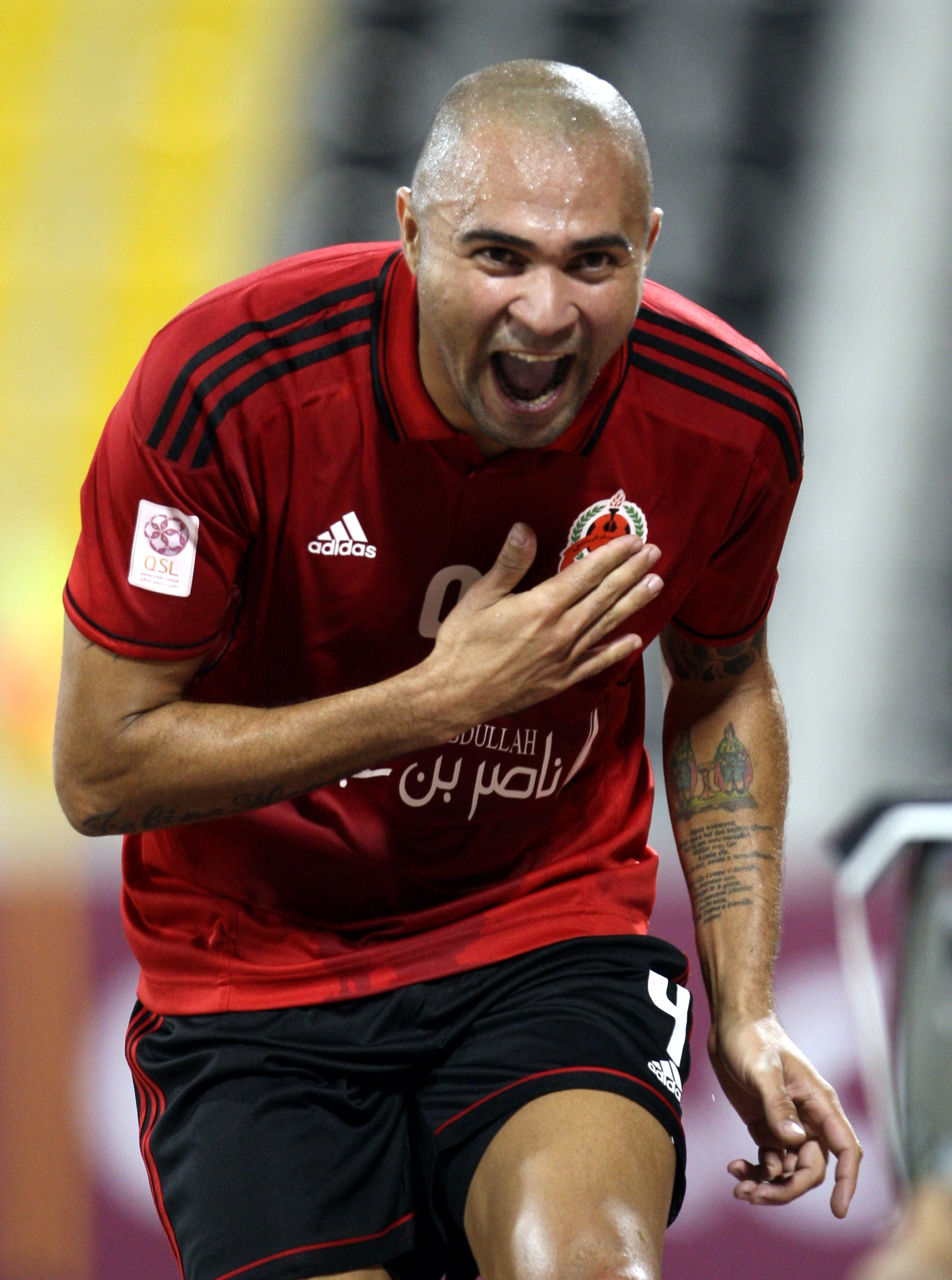
Afonso Alves made 55 appearances and scored 29 goals for Malmö FF between 2004 and 2006.

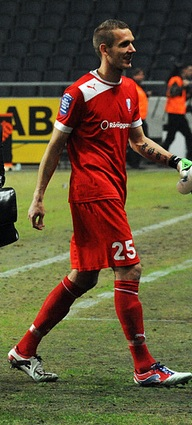
Robin Olsen made 53 appearances for Malmö FF between 2012 and 2015.

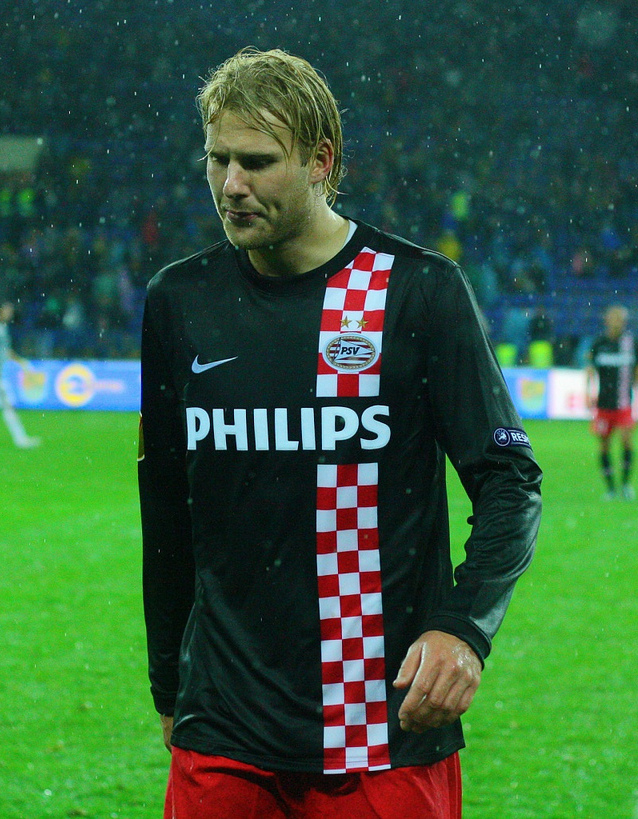
Ola Toivonen made 51 appearances and scored 17 goals for Malmö FF between 2007 and 2008.

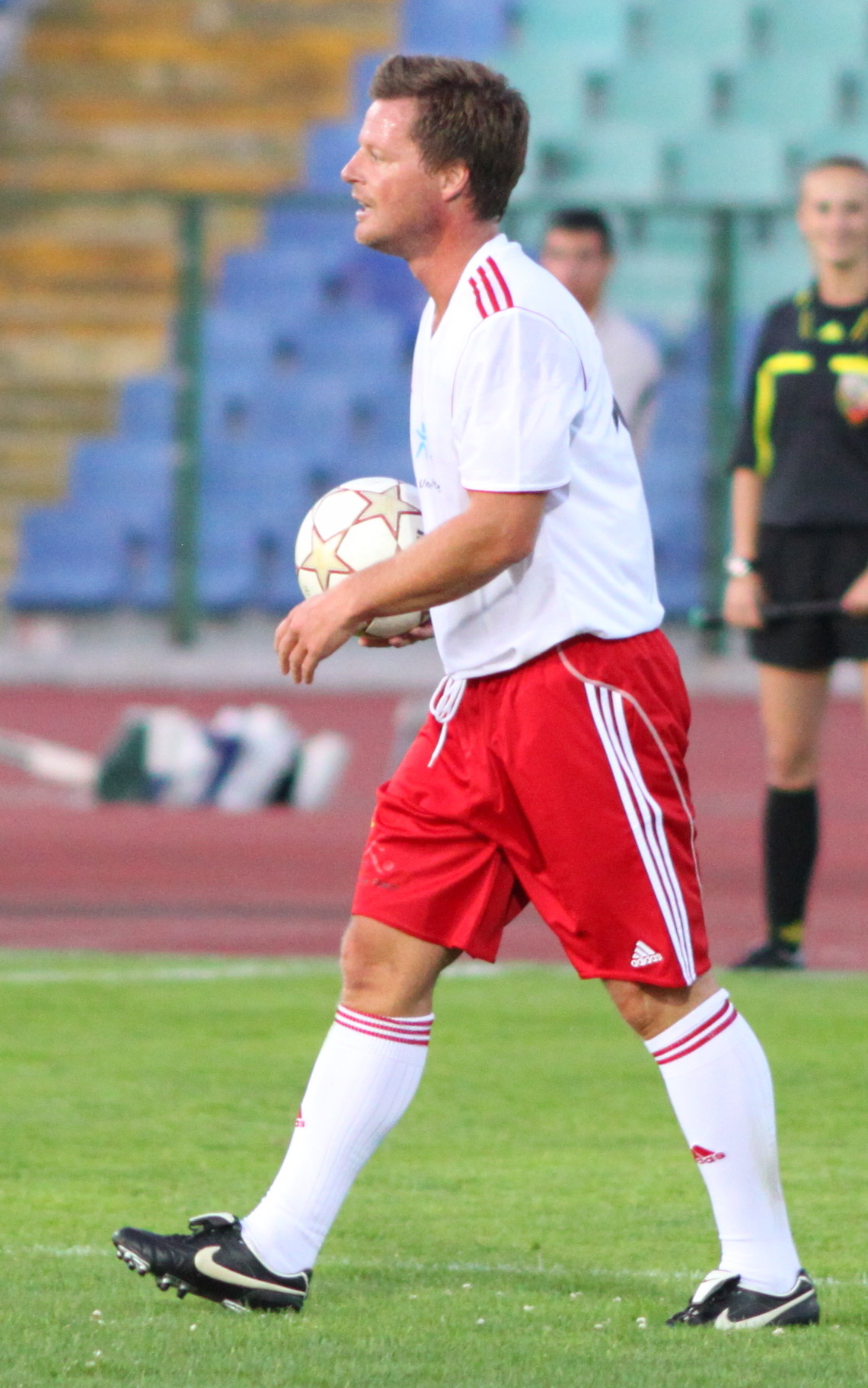
Stefan Schwarz made 29 appearances for Malmö FF between 1988 and 1990.

List of Malmö FF players with between 25 and 99 league appearances
Name	Nationality	Position	Malmö FF career	Appearances	Goals
Henry Dahl	Sweden	FB	1927–1933	99	1
Erik Svensson	Sweden	FW	1923–1935	98	51
Pontus Jansson	Sweden	DF	2009–2014	98	6
Anton Tinnerholm	Sweden	DF	2014–2017	98	6
Lars Larsson	Sweden	FW	1982–1991	97	52
Wílton Figueiredo	Brazil	MF	2009–2012	97	19
Oscar Lewicki ‡	Sweden	MF	2015–	94	4
Valdemar Wiberg	Sweden	GK	1925–1933	92	0
Jimmy Durmaz	Sweden	MF	2008–2012	91	14
Henrik Nilsson	Sweden	MF	1991–1995	91	1
Erdal Rakip	Sweden	MF	2013–2017	90	11
Jon Inge Høiland	Norway	DF	2003–2007	90	9
Conny Andersson	Sweden	FW	1971–1973; 1974–1976	89	31
Ingvar Gärd	Sweden	HB	1944–1951	89	1
Hasse Borg	Sweden	DF	1983–1988	87	10
Håkan Lindman	Sweden	FW	1986–1990	86	28
Daniel Majstorović	Sweden	DF	2001–2004	86	9
Anders Svensson	Sweden	HB	1957–1963; 1967–1969	86	4
Tommy Hansson	Sweden	FW	1975–1980	85	25
Edward Ofere	Nigeria	FW	2005–2010	85	24
Mattias Thylander	Sweden	DF	1995–1999	85	4
Walfrid Ek	Sweden	FW	1946–1953	84	39
Stefan Alvén	Sweden	MF	1991–1994	82	1
Martin Dahlin	Sweden	FW	1988–1991	79	39
Mats Lilienberg	Sweden	FW	1999–2002	79	21
Andreas Yngvesson	Sweden	FW	2002–2005	78	12
Jeffrey Aubynn	Sweden	MF	2008–2011	78	6
Jonas Sandqvist	Sweden	GK	2005–2009	78	0
Jo Inge Berget	Norway	MF	2015–2017	77	25
Carl Florin	Sweden	Unknown	1920–1930	77	1
Gabriel	Brazil	DF	2006–2009	76	1
Matias Concha	Sweden	DF	2000–2003; 2012–2014	75	0
Nils-Åke Sandell	Sweden	FW	1952–1956; 1958	72	64
Brune Tavell	Sweden	MF	1997–2000	72	3
Niklas Gudmundsson	Sweden	FW	1997–2000	71	10
Simon Thern	Sweden	MF	2012–2014	71	9
Filip Helander	Sweden	DF	2012–2015	71	1
Hilding Andersson	Sweden	Unknown	1920–1928	70	18
Henry Vinberg	Sweden	GK	1932–1940	70	0
Rolf Eriksson	Sweden	FW	1961–1965	69	22
Jonas Thern	Sweden	MF	1985–1989	68	10
Erik Johansson	Sweden	MF	2001–2003	68	10
Miiko Albornoz	Chile	DF	2011–2014	68	4
Magnus Wolff Eikrem	Norway	MF	2015–2017	66	12
Tommy Jönsson	Sweden	DF	1994–1997	66	2
Gösta Nilsson	Sweden	FW	1926–1932	65	20
Dejan Pavlovic	Sweden	FW	1997–1999	65	16
Ivo Pękalski	Sweden	MF	2009–2013	65	4
Christer Jacobsson	Sweden	DF	1969–1975	65	1
Mikael Rönnberg	Sweden	MF	1982–1984	64	20
Björn Friberg	Sweden	MF	1967–1973	64	4
Patrik Olsson	Sweden	FW	1993–1997	64	4
Jean-Paul Vonderburg	Sweden	DF	1989–1992	64	3
Gert-Arne Nilsson	Sweden	DF	1960–1967	64	0
Dardan Rexhepi	Kosovo	FW	2010–2013	63	4
Mats Magnusson	Sweden	FW	1981–1985; 1986–1987	62	34
Göte Dahl	Sweden	FW	1931–1938	62	27
Assar Mossberg	Sweden	FB	1932–1938	62	1
Jan-Olov Kindvall	Sweden	MF	1978–1983	61	4
Claes Malmberg	Sweden	MF	1974–1980	61	1
Peter Ijeh	Nigeria	FW	2001–2003	60	38
Jörgen Pettersson	Sweden	FW	1993–1995	60	32
Magnus Eriksson	Sweden	FW	2013–2014	60	16
Fredrik Dahlström	Sweden	FW	1992–1995	60	11
Joakim Nilsson	Sweden	DF	1987–1990	60	3
Enoch Kofi Adu	Ghana	MF	2014–2016	60	3
Louay Chanko	Syria	MF	2003–2005	60	2
Franz Brorsson ‡	Sweden	DF	2015–	60	0
Ove Andersson	Sweden	HB	1935–1940	59	24
Jon Jönsson	Sweden	DF	2001–2006	59	3
Yoshimar Yotún	Peru	DF	2015–2017	58	3
Johan Wiland	Sweden	GK	2015–2017	58	0
Emil Forsberg	Sweden	MF	2013–2014	57	19
Paweł Cibicki	Sweden	MF	2013–2017	57	11
Ulf Kleander	Sweden	DF	1967–1972	57	3
Patrick Andersson	Sweden	MF	1990–1993	56	10
Peter Jönsson	Sweden	DF	1986–1993	56	4
Bengt Fröjd	Sweden	FW	1956–1963	56	3
Pa Konate	Sweden	DF	2013–2017	56	0
Afonso Alves	Brazil	FW	2004–2006	55	29
Jonatan Johansson	Finland	FW	2006–2008	55	23
Erik Johansson	Sweden	DF	2013–2015	55	2
Roger Ljung	Sweden	DF	1985–1989	53	4
Robert Åhman Persson	Sweden	MF	2008–2010	53	4
Thomas Olsson	Sweden	MF	2003–2005	53	3
Jimmy Dixon	Liberia	DF	2007–2009	53	1
Robin Olsen	Sweden	GK	2012–2015	53	0
Karl-Erik Palmér (Note: Karl-Erik Palmér holds the club and Allsvenskan records for most consecutive matches without defeat from debut with 48 matches. The record was set between 6 May 1949 and 1 June 1951.) *	Sweden	MF	1948–1960	52	22
Göte Rosengren	Sweden	FB	1935–1941	52	1
Ola Toivonen	Sweden	MF	2007–2008	51	17
Erik Friberg	Sweden	MF	2012–2013	51	6
Simon Kroon	Sweden	MF	2011–2015	51	3
Jimmy Tamandi	Sweden	DF	1999–2001	51	2
Dag Szepanski	Sweden	FW	1967–1969	50	33
Anders Christiansen ‡	Denmark	MF	2016–2017; 2018–	50	11
Joakim Persson	Sweden	U	1994–1996	50	7
Carl Ahlberg	Sweden	FB	1928–1932	50	4
Labinot Harbuzi	Sweden	MF	2006–2009	50	4
Deval Eminovski	Sweden	MF	1984–1988	49	4
Rasmus Bengtsson ‡	Sweden	DF	2015–	49	3
Alexander Jeremejeff	Sweden	FW	2016–2018	48	11
Erik Levin	Sweden	FB	1937–1945	48	1
Jonas Axeldal	Sweden	FW	1992–1993	47	10
Christian Järdler	Sweden	DF	2006–2008	47	2
Peter Sørensen	Denmark	MF	2000–2002	46	2
Theodor Persson	Sweden	Unknown	1926–1929	46	0
Joakim Nilsson	Sweden	MF	2003–2008	45	0
Sune Andersson	Sweden	FW	1935–1939	44	10
Anders Ohlsson	Sweden	FW	1979–1983	44	4
Rickard Strömbäck	Sweden	DF	1980–1984	44	1
Roland Löwegren	Sweden	DF	1962–1968	44	0
Pertti Alaja	Finland	GK	1982–1983	44	0
John Andersson	Sweden	FB	1934–1940	43	11
Christer Malmberg	Sweden	MF	1966–1975	43	5
Marcus Pode	Sweden	FW	2005–2007	42	8
Peter Hillgren	Sweden	FW	1989–1994	41	8
Tim Parkin	England	DF	1980–1981	41	1
Zlatan Ibrahimović	Sweden	FW	1999–2001	40	16
Axel Håkansson	Sweden	Unknown	1920–1928	40	0
Erik Ohlsson	Sweden	Unknown	1925–1928	40	0
John Rosén	Sweden	Unknown	1923–1928	39	9
Lasse Nielsen ‡	Denmark	DF	2017–	39	1
Júnior	Brazil	FW	2006–2007	38	17
Ragnar Holmstedt	Sweden	Unknown	1934–1937	38	1
Andreas Vindheim ‡	Norway	DF	2015–	38	1
Kári Árnason	Iceland	DF	2015–2017	37	2
Dan Corneliusson	Sweden	FW	1990–1992	36	9
Mattias Svanberg	Sweden	MF	2015–2018	36	5
Freddie Forsland	Sweden	GK	1969–1973	36	0
Fredrik Lindblad	Sweden	Unknown	1920–1926	35	28
Lennart Askerlund	Sweden	FW	1940–1942	35	6
Christian Karlsson	Sweden	DF	1996–1997	35	2
Miljan Mutavdžić	Serbia	MF	2009–2011	35	2
Ebbe Löfgren	Sweden	Unknown	1920–1925	34	0
Gudmundur Mete	Iceland	DF	2000–2002	34	0
Jasmin Sudić	Sweden	DF	2008–2014	34	0
Thomas Sunesson	Sweden	FW	1983–1984	32	12
Tokelo Rantie	South Africa	FW	2012–2013	32	10
Göte Malm	Sweden	HB	1940–1942	32	6
Dušan Melichárek	Czech Republic	GK	2008–2011	32	0
Sverrir Sverrisson	Iceland	MF	1998–1999	31	7
Mika Nurmela	Finland	MF	1993–1995	31	3
Tobias Sana	Sweden	MF	2015–2017	31	1
Fridolf Martinsson	Sweden	FW	1940–1942	30	15
Rolf Andersson	Sweden	FW	1951–1954	30	12
Ove Ericsson	Sweden	FW	1939–1942	30	11
Börje Persson	Sweden	HB	1941–1944	30	7
Peter Abelsson	Sweden	DF	2004–2005	30	3
Vilhelm Nilsson	Sweden	Unknown	1920–1925	29	0
Stefan Schwarz	Sweden	MF	1988–1990	29	0
Brian Steen Nielsen	Denmark	MF	2001–2002	29	0
Yago Fernández	Portugal	DF	2010–2011	28	4
Björn Enqvist	Sweden	MF	1997–1998	28	3
Patrik Sundström	Sweden	MF	1990–1992	28	1
Erik Andersson	Sweden	Unknown	1927–1930	27	0
Mathias Ranégie	Sweden	FW	2011–2012	26	13
Bertil Svensson	Sweden	GK	1961–1962	26	0
Tony Ström	Sweden	GK	1981	26	0
Yngve Johansson	Sweden	FW	1950–1952	25	13
Caspar Pauckstadt	Sweden	MF	1984–1986	25	4
Alexander Nilsson (Note: Alexander Nilsson holds the club record for youngest first-team player at the age of 15 years and 343 days. The record was set in an Allsvenskan match against IF Elfsborg on 17 September 2008.) *	Sweden	FW	2008–2014	25	4
Andrée Jeglertz	Sweden	MF	1991–1992	25	2
Jens Nordström	Sweden	DF	1999–2000	25	1
Marcus Ekheim	Sweden	DF	1989–1991	25	0
