= Gote =

Gote or Göte can refer to the following:

== People ==
- Göte Almqvist (1921 – 1994), Swedish ice hockey player
- Göte Andersson (1909 – 1975), Swedish water polo player who competed in the 1936 Summer Olympics
- Göte Blomqvist (1928 – 2003), Swedish ice hockey player
- Göte Carlsson, Swedish sprint canoer who competed in the late 1930s
- Göte Dahl, Swedish footballer who played as forward
- Göte Hagström, (1918 – 2014), Swedish athlete
- Göte Malm, Swedish footballer who played as midfielder
- Göte Rosengren, Swedish footballer who played as defender
- Göte Strandsjö (1916 – 2001), Swedish hymnwriter
- Göte Turesson (1892 – 1970), Swedish evolutionary botanist
- Göte Wahlström (born 1951), Swedish politician
- Göte Wälitalo (born 1956), Swedish ice hockey goaltender

== Other uses ==
- Gote, a strategic concept in the game of Go
- Gote is the second player in Shogi; in English lingo it is considered White
- GOTE, an acronym to remind actors of four basic elements to consider while preparing a character for the theater

== See also ==
- Goethe (disambiguation)
