= 1984 Svenska Cupen final =

- Event: 1983–84 Svenska Cupen
Malmö FF	Landskrona BoIS
1	0
- Date: 20 June 1984
- Venue: Olympia, Helsingborg
- Referee: Hans Harrysson (Åhus)
- Attendance: 7,810

The 1984 Svenska Cupen final took place on 20 June 1984 in Helsingborg. The match was contested by Allsvenskan side Malmö FF and Division 2 Södra side Landskrona BoIS. Landskrona played its first final since 1976 and its fourth final in total. Malmö FF played its first final since 1980 and its 14th final in total. Malmö FF won its 12th title with a 1–0 victory.

== Match details ==
20 June 1984

Malmö FF	1–0	Landskrona BoIS
Arvidsson 53'

Olympia, Helsingborg
Attendance: 7,810
Referee: Hans Harrysson (Åhus)

Malmö FF	Landskrona BoIS

MALMÖ FF:
GK	(Sweden) Jan Möller
DF	(Sweden) Magnus Andersson
DF	(Sweden) Kent Jönsson
DF	(Sweden) Hasse Borg
DF	(Sweden) Ingemar Erlandsson
MF	(Sweden) Mats Arvidsson	(substituted off) 65'
MF	(Sweden) Mikael Rönnberg
MF	(Sweden) Torbjörn Persson
MF	(Sweden) Mats Magnusson
FW	(Sweden) Lars Larsson
FW	(Sweden) Thomas Sunesson
Substitutes:
MF	(Sweden) Anders Palmér	(substituted on) 65'
MF	(Sweden) Deval Eminovski
Manager:
(Sweden) Tord Grip

LANDSKRONA BOIS:
GK	(Sweden) Peter Joelsson
DF	(Sweden) Lars Andersson
DF	(Sweden) Sonny Johansson
DF	(Sweden) Per-Åke Theander
DF	(Sweden) Anders Nordström
MF	(Sweden) Göran Petersson
MF	(Sweden) Lino Boriero
MF	(Sweden) Peter Ekelund
MF	(Sweden) Richard Jakobsson
FW	(Sweden) Ole Jensen
FW	(Sweden) Håkan Lindroth
Substitutes:
??	(Sweden) Tommy Bengtsson
??	(Sweden) Anders Karlsson
Manager:
(Sweden) Claes Cronqvist
