= Strömbäck =

Strömbäck or Stromback is a Swedish surname that may refer to:

- Doug Stromback (born 1967), an American former professional hockey player
- Helge Strömbäck (1889–1960), a Swedish Navy vice admiral
- Rickard Strömbäck, a Swedish former footballer
- Richard Stromback (born 1969), an American former professional hockey player
