= List of Malmö FF managers =

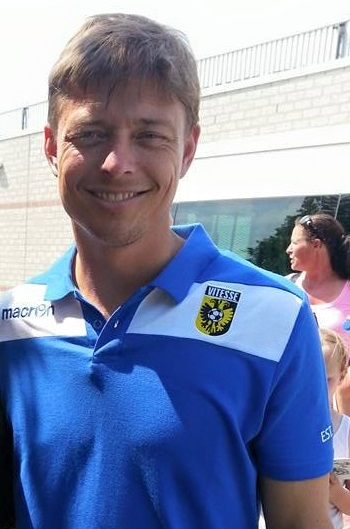
Jon Dahl Tomasson, head coach of Malmö FF. Tomasson has coached the side since January 2020.

Malmö Fotbollförening, also known simply as Malmö FF, is a Swedish professional association football club based in Malmö. The club is affiliated with Skånes Fotbollförbund, and plays home games at Stadion. The club's first team play in Allsvenskan as of 2018, the top league in Swedish football, which takes place from April to October every seasons. Malmö FF won Allsvenskan for the first time in 1944, and most recently repeated this in 2017. Malmö FF were at their strongest during the 1970s, when they won five Swedish championships and four Svenska Cupen titles, and performed well in continental competitions: the team were runners-up in both the 1978–79 European Cup and the 1979 Intercontinental Cup.

Since the club was founded, there have been 32 managers and one caretaker. The honours won by the club under each manager's stewardship are also detailed. As of the start of the 2020 season, 31 men have held the post of Malmö FF manager, the most successful of whom in terms of trophies won is Bob Houghton, who, as manager between 1974 and 1980, led the club to three Swedish league championships and four Svenska Cupen wins. The manager who has won most national league titles with the club is Antonio Durán, who won Allsvenskan four times between 1964 and 1971. Although Roy Hodgson led Malmö FF to the Allsvenskan crown five times in a row between 1985 and 1989, the national championship was decided by a championship play-off during this time, and Malmö FF only won this in 1986 and 1988. Houghton is the club's longest-serving manager, having occupied the position between 1990 and 1992 in addition to the aforementioned period, giving him a total of 10 years in charge. The current manager of Malmö FF is Jon Dahl Tomasson, who has been at the club since 10 January 2020.

== Managerial history ==
=== Early managers (before 1936) ===
Not much is known about the management of Malmö FF during its early days following its establishment in 1910. Its first team had no official manager until 1917, when Ernst Hjertberg coached the team for a year. The post was then vacant until 1932, except for the 1922 season, when Hans Ruff was manager. Following Malmö FF's first season in Allsvenskan, 1931–32, it employed Carl Wijk as manager. Wijk remained in charge until 1934, when the club was disqualified after 13 matches for breaching Swedish football's ban on professional players. The team was barred from playing for the rest of the season, and demoted a division. Wijk was temporarily banned, along with several other members of the club's non-playing staff.

=== First foreign managers, and first honours (1936–71) ===
With Malmö FF back in Allsvenskan from the start of the 1936–37 season, the club once more employed a manager: Václav Simon from Czechoslovakia became the club's first foreign-born manager. After Simon coached the team for a year, he was replaced by Harry Lundahl, who remained until 1941. Carl Ahlberg coached the team from 1942 to 1944. Following his initial tenure between April and November 1944, Sven Nilsson managed the club for two more periods during that decade. During this time he became the club's first Allsvenskan title winning manager, when the team won the league championship at the end of the 1943–44 season. Two Hungarian managers, István Wampetits and Kálmán Konrád, managed Malmö FF between Nilsson's periods in charge. Konrád secured the club's second league title during the 1948–49 season. The team won its third league title in 1950, with Nilsson in charge. Malmö FF continued to be successful during the 1950s: Welshman Bert Turner managed Malmö FF between 1951 and 1954, and led the club to two league championships and two cup titles during this time. He was replaced in 1955 by another foreign-born manager, Austrian Pepi Stroh. Neither Stroh or his successor, former Malmö FF player Nils-Åke Sandell, won any honours. This dry spell ended following the appointment in 1964 of Spaniard Antonio Durán, who coached the club until 1971. During this time Malmö FF won Allsvenskan four times, lifted the cup in 1967, and entered European competitions with limited success.

=== Englishmen Bob Houghton and Roy Hodgson manage the club to unprecedented success (1971–89) ===
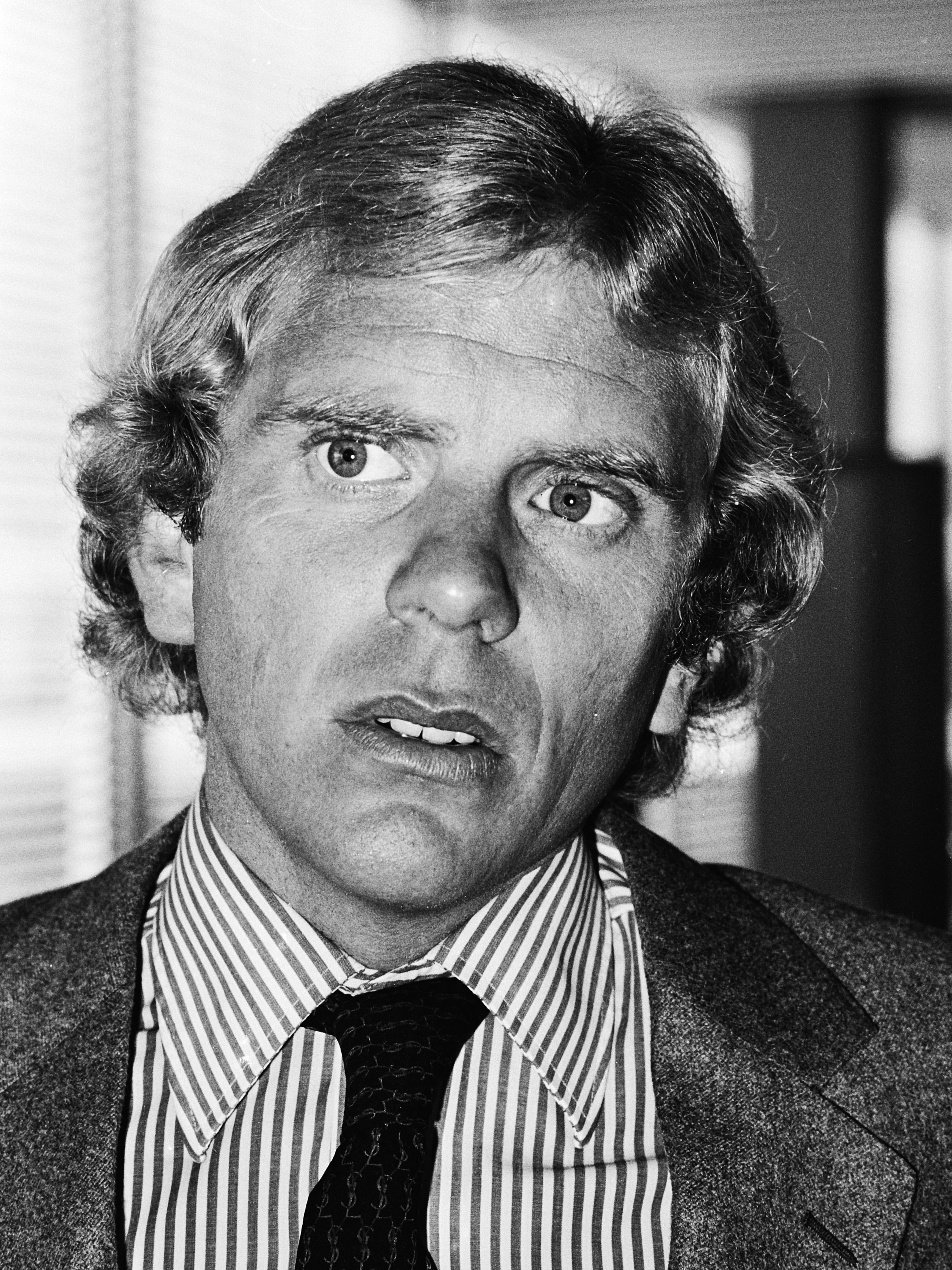
Bob Houghton (1979 photograph) led the club to the 1979 European Cup Final.

Karl-Erik Hult managed the club to a cup title in 1973, before Bob Houghton replaced him in 1974. Malmö FF chairman Eric Persson was reportedly initially hesitant to employ Houghton, who at 27 was younger than several of the club's players, but was convinced when the Englishman met them and won their respect and confidence. Houghton had never met any of the players, but had researched them thoroughly; he impressed the team by immediately recognising each of them and knowing them by first name. Duly installed as coach, Houghton led Malmö FF to three league titles and four cup wins over the course of seven seasons, as well as the 1979 European Cup Final (which was lost to Nottingham Forest) and the 1979 Intercontinental Cup (in which Olimpia of Paraguay defeated Malmö FF 3–1 over two legs). Houghton left the club in 1980, but is held in high regard at the club to the present day; a corner section of the club's present stadium, Stadion, is named "Bob's Corner" after him. Fellow Englishman Keith Blunt replaced Houghton, and remained for three seasons before Tord Grip took over. Grip managed Malmö FF to a cup title in 1984 before leaving the same year. Another Englishman, Roy Hodgson, managed the club between 1985 and 1990. Under his leadership, the club won five consecutive Allsvenskan titles, and also won the then-extant league championship play-offs on two occasions, in 1986 and 1988. The side also won cup titles in 1986 and 1989. Hodgson's tenure as Malmö FF manager is the most successful in terms of win percentage and Allsvenskan titles won. Like Houghton, Hodgson also has a section at Stadion: "Roy's Corner". "Bob's Corner" and "Roy's Corner" flank the stadium's standing section on each side.

=== Recent managers (since 1989) ===
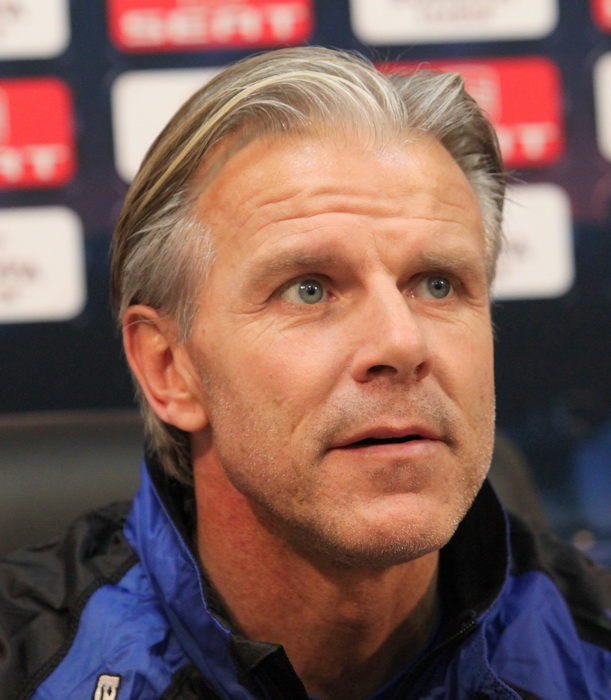
Roland Nilsson (2011 photograph) managed the club from 2008 to 2011.

Hodgson's departure from the club in 1989 marked the start of a 15-year period during which Malmö FF failed to win a league or cup title. Houghton initially returned in Hodgson's place, but the former manager's two-year sojourn back at the club proved largely unsuccessful. He was replaced by Dane Viggo Jensen in July 1992. Jensen returned to Denmark at the end of the 1993 season, and was succeeded by Rolf Zetterlund, who managed the club between 1994 and 1996. Zetterlund's time at the club was fairly successful as the club finished each of his years in charge in the top four league places. Dutchman Frans Thijssen took Zetterlund's place in January 1997, and stayed at the club until August 1998 when he was sacked following poor results in Allsvenskan and European competition. Roland Andersson then managed the club until it was relegated at the end of the 1999 season. As the club had never before been relegated (having only previously been removed from the top division by a punitive demotion), Andersson was sacked. He was replaced by Michael Andersson (no relation), who guided the team to promotion back to Allsvenskan at the first attempt.

Tom Prahl, who had guided Halmstads BK to the league title in 1997 and 2000, took Andersson's place before the start of the 2002 season, and during his first year in charge led Malmö FF to second place in Allsvenskan, the club's best league finish since 1996. After finishing third in 2003, expectations were high during early 2004, when the club signed several well-known players, including FC Barcelona defender Patrik Andersson, a former Malmö FF player. The Swedish press compared this spending spree to those of Real Madrid, and labelled Malmö FF's new collection of players "Real Malmö". Malmö FF lived up to these expectations during the 2004 season by winning the club's first league title since 1989.

After Prahl's contract ran out at the end of 2005, he was replaced by Sören Åkeby. Having won consecutive league titles with Djurgårdens IF in 2002 and 2003, Åkeby was widely respected on his appointment, but he proved unable to continue where Prahl left off. He was let go by the club after two seasons, and replaced by Roland Nilsson. After two seasons with the team, Nilsson guided the club to their 19th Allsvenskan title in 2010, the year of the team's centenary. Nilsson left to manage F.C. Copenhagen in June 2011. Former AIK manager Rikard Norling was appointed on 3 June 2011. After being one goal away from qualifying for the group stage of the 2011–12 UEFA Champions League he guided the club to a fourth position in 2011. The 2012 season almost resulted in a new league title as Malmö FF fought for the title until the last round, in the end the club ended in third place. Norling won the club's 17th Swedish Championship and 20th Allsvenskan title in the 2013 season. Norling announced his resignation on 27 November and cited undisclosed reasons for his decision. On 9 January 2014 the club announced the appointment of Norwegian Åge Hareide as the club's new manager. Hareide was the first non-Swedish manager for the club since Dutchman Frans Thijssen who left Malmö FF in 1998. Hareide had immediate success at the club as he led the team to defend their Allsvenskan title and qualify for the group stage of the 2014–15 UEFA Champions League in his first season. After a second spell in Champions League in 2015, Hareide left the club to coach Denmark national football team and he was replaced by Allan Kuhn

== Managers ==
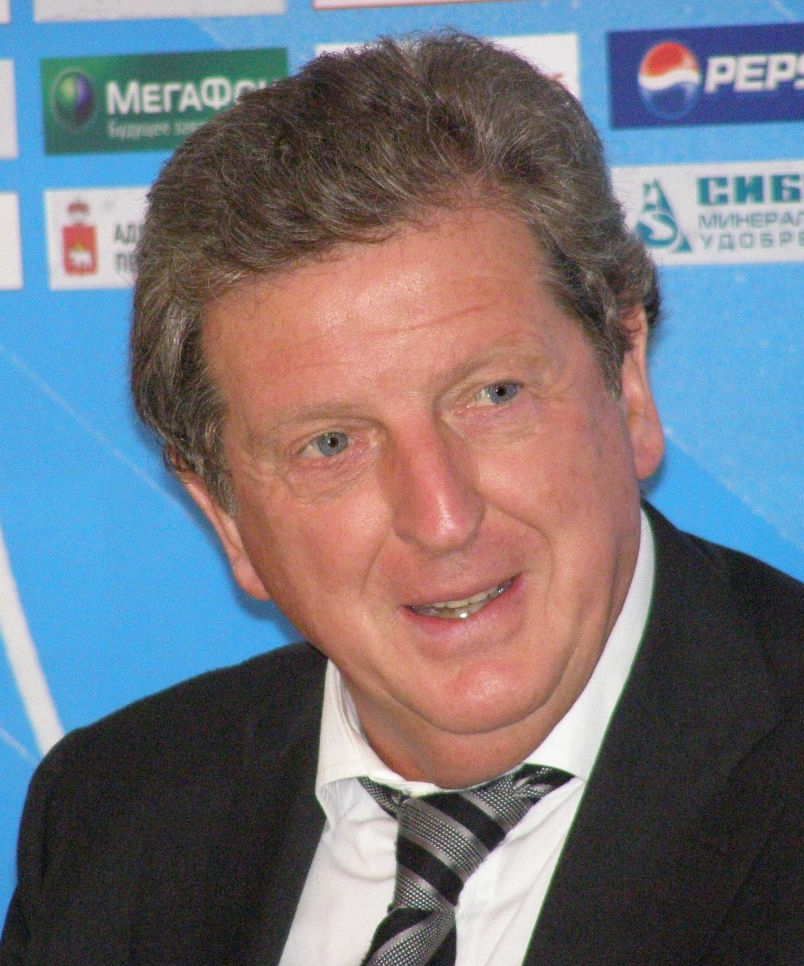
Roy Hodgson won five consecutive Allsvenskan titles and two Svenska Cupen titles during his five years at the club. He is pictured in 2010 as manager of Fulham.

Information correct as of matches played up until 4 July 2026

Table headers

- Nationality – If the manager played international football as a player, the country he played for is shown. Otherwise, the manager's nationality is given as their country of birth.
- From and To – The dates for Hans Ruff up to Michael Andersson are the dates for the first and last competitive match since the exact arrival and departure dates for these managers are unavailable. The exact dates for arrival and departure is displayed from Tom Prahl up to Jon Dahl Tomasson.
- P – The number of games managed for Malmö FF, only competitive matches are counted.^{[A]}
- W – The number of games won as a manager.
- D – The number of games draw as a manager.
- L – The number of games lost as a manager.
- GF – The number of goals scored under his management.
- GA – The number of goals conceded under his management.
- GD – The goal difference under his management.
- Win% – The total winning percentage under his management.
- Allsvenskan titles – The Allsvenskan title winning seasons while managing Malmö FF, the cell is sorted by number of titles won.
- Other honours – Other notable honours the manager has achieved while managing Malmö FF. W = Winners and RU = Runners-up. The cell is sorted by number of honours won.

Name	Nation	From	To	P	W	D	L	GF	GA	GD	Win%^{[B]}	Allsvenskan titles^{[C]}	Other honours	Ref
Ernst Hjertberg	Sweden	1917^{[D]}	1917^{[D]}	1	0	0	1	1	4	−3	0.0	–	–	
Hans Ruff	Sweden	30 April 1922	12 November 1922	12	2	2	8	12	22	−10	16.7	–	–	
Carl Wijk	Sweden	31 July 1932	2 April 1934	35	13	3	19	69	104	−35	37.1	–	–	
Václav Simon	Czechoslovakia	9 August 1936	13 June 1937	22	9	3	10	39	45	−6	40.9	–	–	
Harry Lundahl	Sweden	17 August 1937	2 November 1941	102	30	39	33	141	145	−4	29.4	–	–	
Carl Ahlberg	Sweden	12 April 1942	16 April 1944	50	29	8	13	99	65	+34	58.0	–	–	
Sven Nilsson	Sweden	23 April 1944	12 November 1944	26	17	4	5	83	34	+49	65.4	1943–44	1944 Svenska Cupen – W	
István Wampetits	Hungary	15 April 1945	3 June 1945	13	9	1	3	36	16	+20	69.2	–	–	
Sven Nilsson	Sweden	29 July 1945	10 November 1946	43	26	9	8	105	50	+55	60.5	–	1946 Svenska Cupen – W 1945 Svenska Cupen – RU	
Kálmán Konrád	Hungary	13 April 1947	6 November 1949	72	46	13	13	217	93	+124	63.9	1948–49	1947 Svenska Cupen – W	
Sven Nilsson	Sweden	10 April 1950	5 November 1950	23	18	4	1	70	24	+46	78.3	1949–50	–	
Bert Turner	Wales	15 April 1951	7 November 1954	97	57	16	24	223	121	+102	58.8	1950–51; 1952–53	1951 Svenska Cupen – W 1953 Svenska Cupen – W	
Pepi Stroh	Austria	17 April 1955	19 December 1958	87	44	21	22	182	118	+64	50.6	–	–	
Nils-Åke Sandell	Sweden	19 April 1959	20 October 1963	110	51	21	38	189	167	+22	46.4	–	–	
Antonio Durán	Spain	12 April 1964	24 October 1971	211	111	46	54	414	261	+153	52.6	1965; 1967; 1970; 1971	1967 Svenska Cupen – W 1970–71 Svenska Cupen – RU	
Karl-Erik Hult	Sweden	16 April 1972	27 October 1973	57	26	14	17	100	63	+37	45.6	–	1972–73 Svenska Cupen – W	
Bob Houghton	England	13 April 1974	25 June 1980	226	131	58	37	373	174	+199	58.0	1974; 1975; 1977	1979 Intercontinental Cup – RU; 1978–79 European Cup – RU; 1973–74 Svenska Cupen – W 1974–75 Svenska Cupen – W 1977–78 Svenska Cupen – W 1979–80 Svenska Cupen – W	
Keith Blunt	England	2 July 1980	24 October 1982	82	35	21	26	117	95	+22	42.7	–	–	
Tord Grip	Sweden	17 April 1983	10 October 1984	60	31	13	16	123	71	+52	51.7	–	1983–84 Svenska Cupen – W	
Roy Hodgson	England	14 April 1985	15 November 1989	165	98	38	29	306	140	+166	59.4	1985^{[E]} 1986; 1987^{[E]} 1988; 1989^{[E]}	1985–86 Svenska Cupen – W 1988–89 Svenska Cupen – W	
Bob Houghton	England	8 April 1990	19 July 1992	78	28	29	21	93	66	+27	35.9	–	–	
Viggo Jensen	Denmark	16 August 1992	24 October 1993	42	18	7	17	68	54	+14	42.9	–	–	
Rolf Zetterlund	Sweden	4 April 1994	26 October 1996	102	52	27	23	159	109	+50	51.0	–	1995–96 Svenska Cupen – RU	
Frans Thijssen	Netherlands	6 April 1997	22 August 1998	51	20	14	17	88	60	+28	39.2	–	–	
Roland Andersson	Sweden	23 August 1998	30 October 1999	43	17	7	19	60	65	−5	39.5	–	–	
Michael Andersson	Sweden	16 April 2000	27 October 2001	63	33	11	19	97	84	+13	52.4	–	2000 Superettan – RU	
Tom Prahl	Sweden	1 January 2002	31 December 2005	129	68	23	38	228	143	+85	52.7	2004	–	
Sören Åkeby	Sweden	1 January 2006	31 December 2007	56	21	15	20	92	70	+22	37.5	–	–	
Roland Nilsson	Sweden	1 January 2008	29 May 2011	109	54	24	31	179	121	+58	49.5	2010	2011 Svenska Supercupen – RU	
Rikard Norling	Sweden	3 June 2011	30 November 2013	105	56	27	22	173	114	+59	53.3	2013	2013 Svenska Supercupen – W	
Åge Hareide	Norway	9 January 2014	8 December 2015	95	49	20	26	166	121	+45	51.6	2014	2014 Svenska Supercupen – W	
Allan Kuhn	Denmark	8 January 2016	19 November 2016	37	26	4	7	77	35	+42	70.3	2016	2015–16 Svenska Cupen – RU	
Magnus Pehrsson	Sweden	23 November 2016	14 May 2018	48	28	10	10	88	50	+38	58.3	2017	2017–18 Svenska Cupen – RU	
Daniel Andersson (caretaker)	Sweden	14 May 2018	12 June 2018	3	1	1	1	5	4	+1	33.3	–	–	
Uwe Rösler	Germany	12 June 2018	13 December 2019	83	51	22	10	158	57	+101	61.4	–	–	
Jon Dahl Tomasson	Denmark	10 January 2020	30 December 2021	93	52	21	20	187	104	+83	55.9	2020; 2021	2019–20 Svenska Cupen – RU	
Miloš Milojević	Serbia	7 January 2022	29 July 2022	26	16	4	6	48	28	+20	61.5	–	2021–22 Svenska Cupen – RU	
Andreas Georgson (caretaker)	Sweden	29 July 2022	5 September 2022	10	5	2	3	26	11	+15	50.0	–	–	
Åge Hareide (interim)	Norway	6 September 2022	30 November 2022	15	3	3	9	18	24	−6	20.0	–	–	
Henrik Rydström	Sweden	1 December 2022	26 September 2025	126	74	26	26	263	135	+128	58.7	2023; 2024	2023–24 Svenska Cupen – RU	
Anes Mravac (interim)	Sweden	27 September 2025	22 December 2025	11	3	2	6	12	22	−10	27.3	–	–	
Miguel Ángel Ramírez	Spain	1 January 2026	26 May 2026	15	6	1	8	23	26	−3	40.0	–	–	
Guillermo Molins (caretaker)	Sweden	26 May 2026	4 July 2026	2	2	0	0	6	2	+4	100.0	–	–	

== Footnotes ==
A. The competitions counted here are: Division 2, Superettan, Svenska Serien, Allsvenskan, Svenska Mästerskapet, Svenska Supercupen, Svenska Cupen, the UEFA Intertoto Cup, the Inter-Cities Fairs Cup, the UEFA Cup Winners' Cup, the UEFA Europa League including the UEFA Cup, the UEFA Champions League including the European Cup and the Intercontinental Cup.
B. Each manager's winning percentage is rounded to one decimal place.
C. These titles are all equivalent to Swedish championship titles, except for those years noted below in footnote E.
D. The exact dates for Hjertberg's arrival and departure from the club are not known. Malmö FF took part in only one competitive match during the 1917 season: a 4–1 defeat to IFK Malmö in the Svenska Mästerskapet qualifying round.
E. Between and including the 1982 and 1990 seasons, the Swedish football championship was decided not by the final standings in Allsvenskan, but by a play-off held following the Allsvenskan season, which pitted the four best-placed clubs against each other in a two-legged cup format. The Malmö FF team won Allsvenskan five times in a row between 1985 and 1989, but had to contest these play-offs each time to claim the national title. Though they won the play-offs in 1986 and 1988, they failed to do so in 1985, 1987 and 1989, and therefore were not Swedish champions those years.
