= Goethe (disambiguation) =

Goethe usually refers to the German writer Johann Wolfgang von Goethe (1749–1832).

Goethe may also refer to:

- Goethe (surname)
- Goethe (grape), grape variety
- Goethe (train), an express train formerly operated in France and Germany
- 3047 Goethe, asteroid
- Goethe!, a 2010 film by Philipp Stölzl
- Goethe: Life as a Work of Art, a 2013 biography by Rüdiger Safranski
- Mount Goethe, a mountain in California

== See also ==
- Goethe University Frankfurt
- Goethe-Institut, non-profit organisation
- Goethe Awards
- Goethe Prize
- Goethe Medal
- Goethe Basin
- Gote (disambiguation)
