= Barntrean =

- Genre: children
- Starring: Ingamay Hörnberg, Skurt
- Voices of: Ingamay Hörnberg
- Country of origin: Sweden
- Original language: Swedish

Original release
- Network: TV3
- Release: 1989 – 2005

Barntrean was TV3's children's programming block between 1989 and 2005. The programmes were presented by Ingamay Hörnberg and Skurt and aired on late afternoons-early evening between Monday-Friday and Saturday and Sunday mornings. After over 17 years, Ingamay Hörnberg and Skurt left TV3, which no longer airs children's programming.

At the time of its final broadcast (on 2 January 2005), it aired for one hour.

== Programmes included ==
- Biker Mice from Mars
- Count Duckula
- Duck Tales
- Dastardly and Muttley in Their Flying Machines
- The Flintstones
- Fantastic Max
- James Bond Junior
- Mighty Morphin' Power Rangers
- The Mysterious Cities of Gold
- Scooby-Doo
- Super Friends
- The Smurfs
- Teenage Mutant Ninja Turtles
- The Real Ghostbusters
- Tugs
- Widget
- Yogi Bear
- Digimon
