= Göta =

Swedish given name

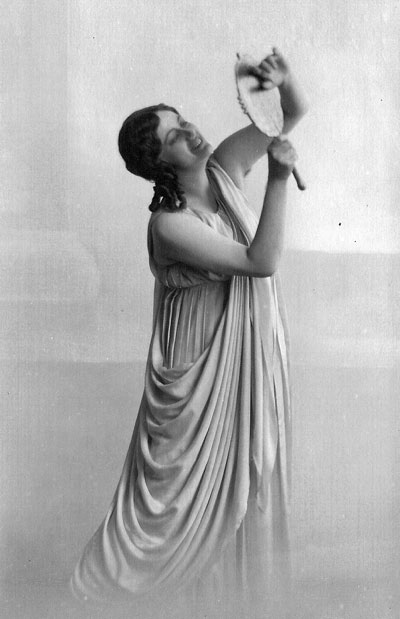
- Gender: Female

Origin
- Region of origin: Sweden

Other names
- Related names: Goethe, Gote

Göta is a Swedish given name, which is the female equivalent of Göte. It may refer to:

- Göta Ljungberg (1893–1955), Swedish singer
- Göta Pettersson (1926–1993), Swedish gymnast
- Göta Rosén (1904–2006), Swedish politician and social worker

== Other uses ==
- Göta, Sweden
- Göta älv, a river in Sweden
- Göta älvbron, a bridge in Gothenburg
- Göta Canal, a waterway in Sweden
- Göta Court of Appeal, in Jönköping
- Göta highway, in southern Sweden
- Göta Lejon, a theatre in Stockholm
