= Angelou (crater) =

Crater on Mercury

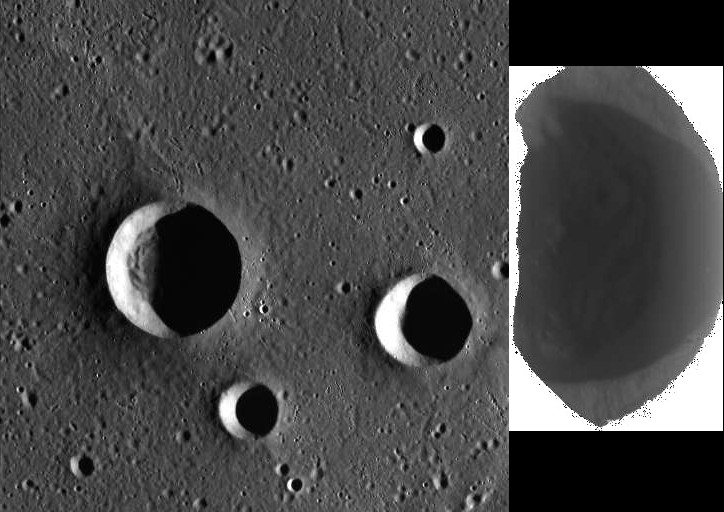
- The left image shows Angelou crater on the left. On the right is a broadband image of the interior, shadowed part of Angelou.
- Feature type: Impact crater
- Location: Borealis quadrangle, Mercury
- Coordinates: 80.32°N 66.71°W
- Diameter: 18 km (11 mi)
- Eponym: Maya Angelou

Angelou is a crater on Mercury. It has a diameter of 18 kilometers. Its name was adopted by the International Astronomical Union (IAU) on September 11, 2019. Angelou is named for the American poet and author Maya Angelou.

Angelou lies on the west side of the much larger Goethe crater.
