= Skurt =

- Barntrean character
- Motion capture: Ingamay Hörnberg

In-universe information
- Species: frog-alike
- Gender: male
- Nationality: Swedish

Skurt was a puppet that appeared on the Swedish TV-channel TV3, in the show Barntrean (Children's TV 3). The show started in October 1989 and ended in 2006.

== Recent years ==
Skurt is no longer associated with TV3. But he still appears and talks about how much vandalism costs society, how to stay safe during summer (especially in the sun), and how people get their electricity. Most of these appearances are shown early in schools, as informational videos.

Skurt is the "person" who has interviewed the Swedish queen, Queen Silvia, the most times.

== See also ==
- Ingamay Hörnberg
