= Laxness (crater) =

Crater on Mercury

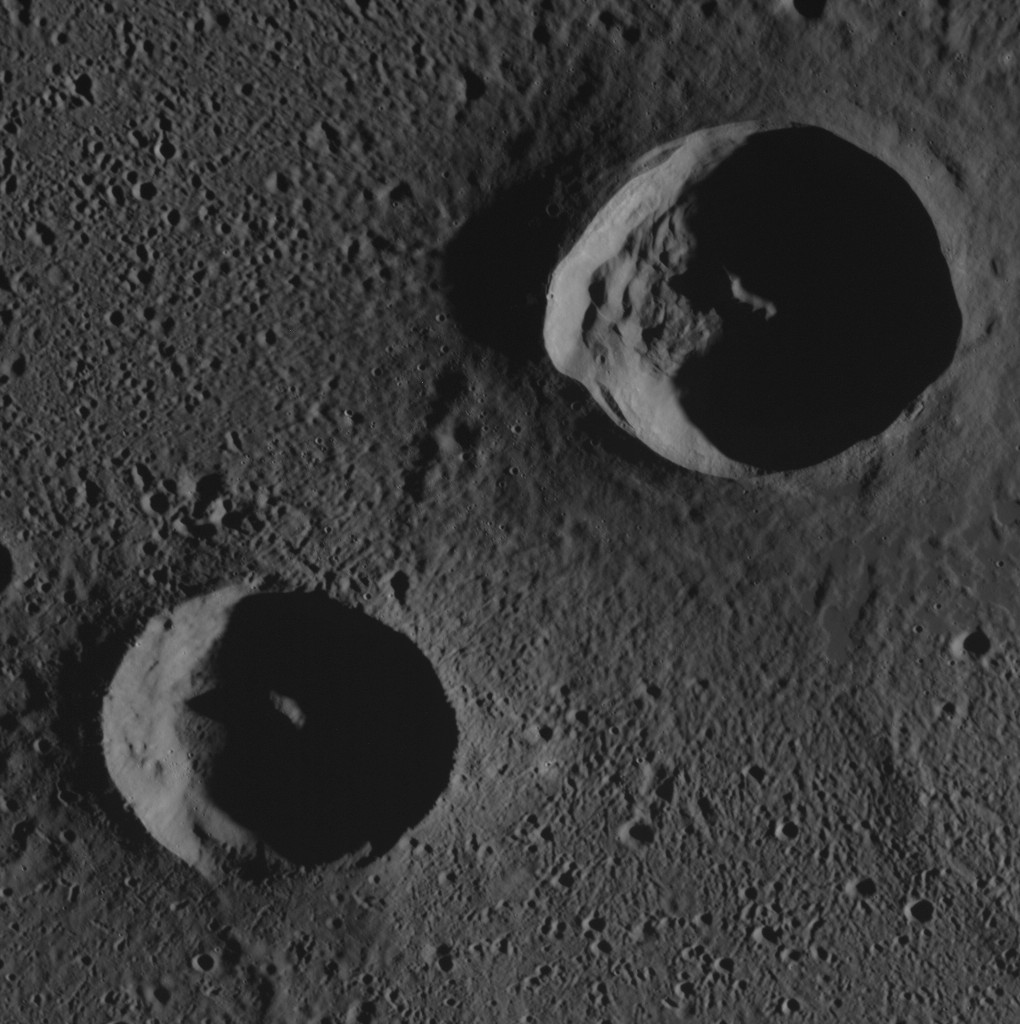
- MESSENGER image of Laxness crater (bottom left) and Fuller crater (top right)
- Planet: Mercury
- Coordinates: 83.27°N 50.04°W
- Quadrangle: Borealis
- Diameter: 25.89 km
- Eponym: Halldór Laxness

Laxness is a crater on Mercury, located near the north pole. It was named by the IAU in 2013, after Icelandic writer Halldór Laxness.

S band radar data from the Arecibo Observatory collected between 1999 and 2005 indicates a radar-bright area along the southern interior of Laxness, which is probably indicative of a water ice deposit, and lies within the permanently shadowed part of the crater.

Fuller crater is southeast of Laxness. Both lie in the northern part of the Goethe Basin.
