= Fuller (crater) =

Crater on Mercury

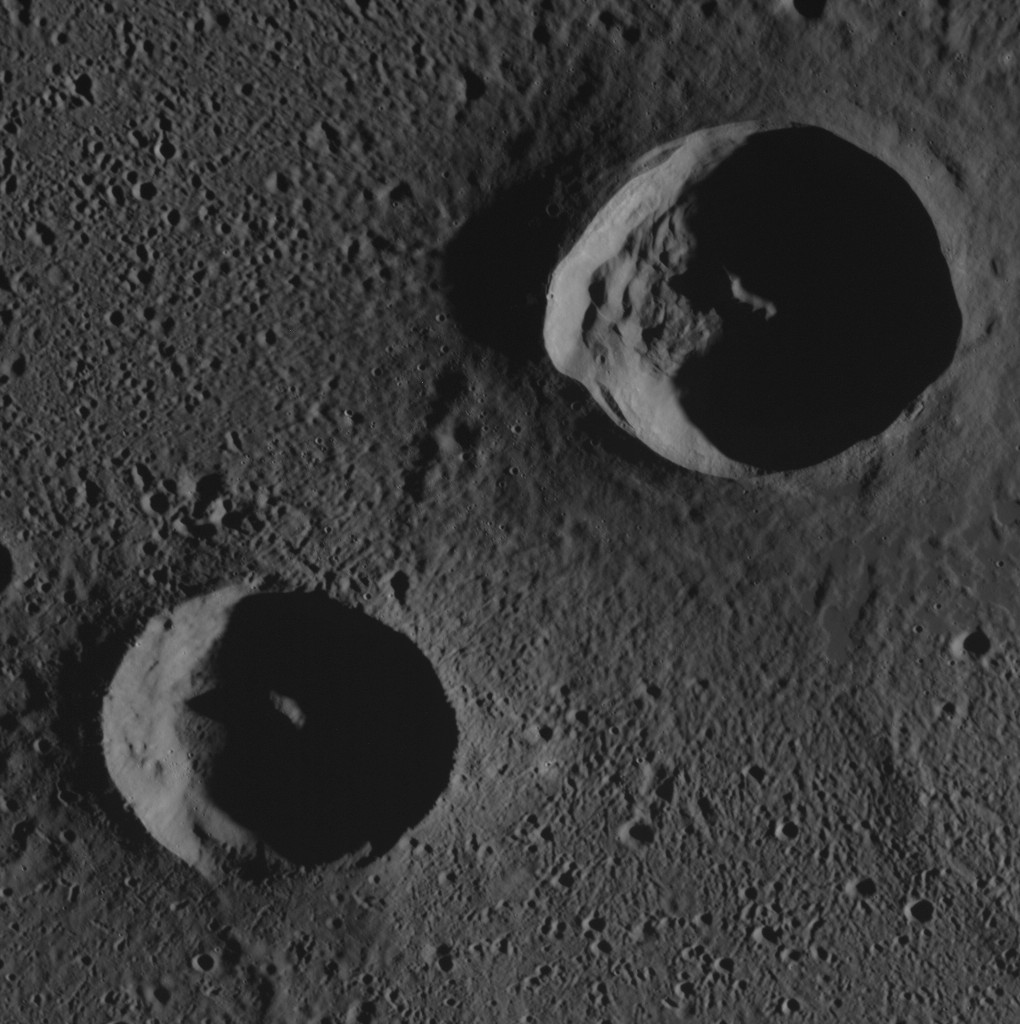
- MESSENGER image of Laxness crater (bottom left) and Fuller crater (top right)
- Feature type: Central-peak impact crater
- Location: Borealis quadrangle, Mercury
- Coordinates: 82.63°N 42.65°W
- Diameter: 26.97 km
- Eponym: Richard Buckminster Fuller

Fuller is a crater on Mercury, located near the north pole. It was named by the IAU in 2013, after American engineer and architect Richard Buckminster Fuller.

S band radar data from the Arecibo Observatory collected between 1999 and 2005 indicates a radar-bright area along the southern interior of Fuller, which is probably indicative of a water ice deposit, and lies within the permanently shadowed part of the crater.

Laxness crater is northwest of Fuller. Both lie in the northern part of the Goethe Basin.

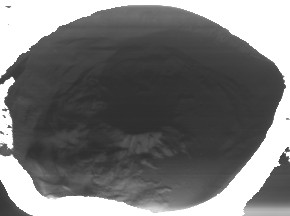
Oblique view of the crater's interior, illuminated by reflected light off the north wall
