= Ingamay Hörnberg =

Swedish singer

- Born: 15 May 1948 (age 77); Sörby, Sweden

Ingamay Hörnberg, born 15 May 1948, is a Swedish singer who recorded many Christian songs in the 1960s and 1970s. She later returned to something of a celebrity status in Sweden, due to her appearances on TV-show Skurt.

Hörnberg participated in TV-shows with Göte Strandsjö and Christian chores, in group and single. Hörnberg has also recorded a number of albums, the latest being Nära dig ändå (Close to you still), released in 2003.
