= Per-Åke Theander =

Swedish footballer (born 1955)

Per-Åke Theander (born 1955) is a Swedish former footballer who played as a midfielder. He was a youth product of Landskrona BoIS, a club he stayed with throughout his entire career.

He debuted in his club's senior team in the 1977 season, and remained with "BoIS" for thirteen seasons. He played 400 matches for them, with only eleven other players have represented the club on more occasions. During his first four seasons, the club played in the top-flight Swedish league, Allsvenskan. After their relegation in 1980, from 1981 to 1984, as well as between 1986 and 1989, he played in the second tier of Swedish football (which at that time was split up in a Southern and a Northern division). As Landskrona BoIS in 1984 was relegated yet again, down to the "agricultural level", or Division 3 (which in 1985 comprised 144 clubs in 12 regional leagues), many players left or quit but Theander remained. After a poor 1985 season opening they managed to win their regional league, and after an exciting home-away playoff against Linköping FF, returned up a level. During his entire time at the club he scored 28 goals. He was funny and well liked among his teammates, who sometimes gave him the nickname "The club's own Basil Fawlty" (after John Cleese's famous Fawlty Towers character)
