= Kerstin Anér =

Swedish politician (1920–1991)

Member of the Swedish Parliament for Stockholm County
- In office 1976–1985

Member of the Swedish Parliament for Stockholm Municipality
- In office 1971–1976

Member of the Andra kammaren for the City of Stockholm
- In office 1969–1970

Personal details
- Born: 28 March 1920 Stockholm, Sweden
- Died: 23 November 1991 (aged 71) Södertälje Municipality, Sweden
- Party: Liberal People's Party
- Education: University of Gothenburg (PhD)
- Occupation: Journalist, writer

Kerstin Anér (28 March 1920 – 23 November 1991) was a Swedish politician and Christian writer.

== Early life and education ==
Kerstin Anér was born in Stockholm; her parents were the business executive Josef Anér and teacher and poet Gunvor Anér, née Löfvendahl; her brother Sven Anér is also an author and journalist. She earned a PhD in 1948 from Göteborgs högskola, one of the precursors of the University of Gothenburg, with a thesis on the Swedish press and literary scene in the 1790s.

== Career ==
Anér worked at the literary magazine Bonniers from 1946 to 1959 and at the women's weekly Idun from 1951 to 1963, and was a producer at Sveriges Radio from 1956 to 1969. From 1976 to 1980 she was secretary of state in the Ministry of Education.

She was a member of the Swedish parliament from 1969 to 1985: in 1969–70 representing the city of Stockholm in the lower chamber, in 1971–76 representing the municipality of Stockholm (the constituency having been renamed and the parliament become unicameral), and in 1976–85 representing Stockholm county. Among other parliamentary posts, she was a member of the Agriculture Committee from 1972 to 1976 and of the Culture Committee from 1979 to 1982. From 1975 to 1981 she was second deputy group chairman of the Liberal People's Party. In parliament she was active in issues of research and the environment, and was amongst the first to pay attention to issues of privacy raised by computerisation. She participated in a number of government inquiries into issues including privacy, research ethics, genetic technology and energy.

Anér also represented Sweden at the Parliamentary Assemble of the Council of Europe in 1980-1983.

Anér coined the term Data Shadow, central to issues of data privacy law and politics. She mentions the terms for the first time (in print) in the Christian cultural magazine Vår Lösen in 1972, in an essay entitled "Dataskuggan" (the Data Shadow). The term has since become central to, and an established part of, computer science as well as debates on data privacy law, politics and ethics.

Anér was active for many years in the Swedish branch of Save the Children and was its chairman from 1978 to 1983.

== Christianity ==
Anér was a keen debater representing a Christian viewpoint, and spoke widely throughout Sweden in both churches and Liberal People's Party branches.

She published several Bible study and prayer books, including God's word and today's news (1969), God now: Kerstin Anér reads the Bible (1974), God here: a politician's prayer book (1977) and God's word in time (1981).

Two of her hymns, Du är större än mitt hjärta and Jublande lyfter vi här våra händer, appear in the 1986 Church of Sweden hymnal.

== Family ==
Anér married Frans Oskar Sigurd Hallström in 1949 and they had three children.

== Bibliography ==
Anér, K. (1975) Datamakt. Falköping: Gummessons förlag.

Anér, K. (1983) Jungfru Maria Herrens moder. Stockholm: Proprius förlag.
