= Henry Vinberg =

Swedish footballer

Personal information
- Full name: Henry Vinberg
- Position: Goalkeeper

Senior career*
Years	Team	Apps	(Gls)
1932–1940	Malmö FF	70	(0)
- * Club domestic league appearances and goals

Henry Vinberg was a Swedish footballer who played as a goalkeeper.
