= Tord Grip =

Swedish former football coach and player

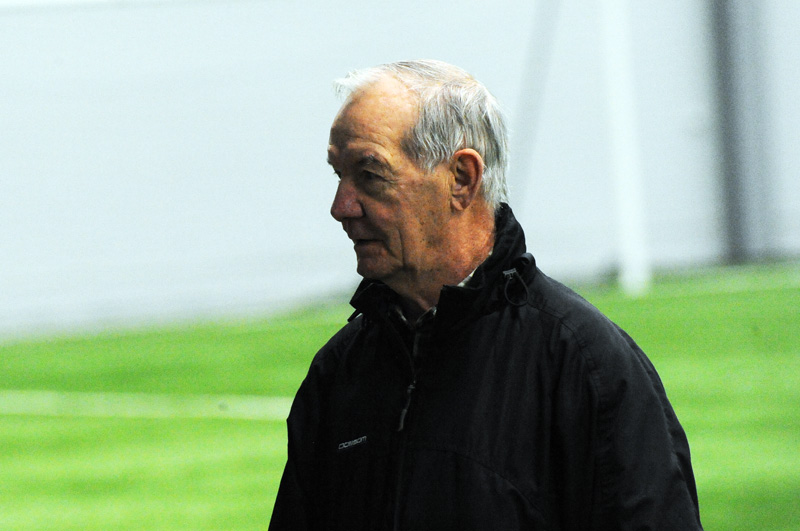
- Grip at Bosön in 2013

Personal information
- Full name: Tord Erland Grip
- Date of birth: 13 January 1938 (age 88)
- Place of birth: Ytterhogdal, Sweden

Senior career*
Years	Team	Apps	(Gls)
–1955	Ytterhogdals		
1956–1965	Degerfors		
1966–1968	AIK	56	(16)
1969–1973	Karlskoga		

International career
1958–1961	Sweden U23	10	(9)
1963–1965	Sweden B	6	(7)
1963–1967	Sweden	3	(1)

Managerial career
- 1969–1974: Karlskoga
- 1974–1975: Örebro
- 1976: Degerfors
- 1977–1978: Sweden (assistant manager)
- 1978: Sweden (women)
- 1979–1980: Örebro
- 1980: Sweden U21
- 1983–1984: Malmö
- 1986: Campobasso
- 1987–1988: Norway
- 1988–1990: Young Boys
- 1991–1995: Sweden (assistant manager)
- 1995–1996: Indonesia U-23
- 1997: Young Boys
- 1998–2001: Lazio (assistant manager)
- 2001–2006: England (assistant manager)
- 2007–2008: Manchester City (first team coach)
- 2009: Mexico (assistant manager)
- 2009–2010: Notts County (assistant director of football)
- 2010: Ivory Coast (assistant coach)
- 2014–2016: Kosovo (assistant coach)
- * Club domestic league appearances and goals

Tord Erland Grip (born 13 January 1938) is a Swedish former football coach and player. He has worked with several national teams, including Norway, England, Sweden, Indonesia, Mexico, the Ivory Coast and Kosovo.

== Playing career ==
Grip began his football career as a teenager playing for Ytterhogdals, where he, like most footballers of his generation also played bandy, later playing part-time in the top flight for Degerfors and AIK while studying for his degree in Physical Education. He played for a reserve side of Aston Villa during a three-month work placement in Birmingham in 1961, although he only appeared in local Intermediate League matches.

== Coaching career ==
Grip became a player/manager at Karlskoga in 1969, and has since managed several other clubs in Sweden, Italy and Switzerland.

He has also managed the Norway national team, the Swedish women's senior team and men's under-16 team, and has had two spells as assistant manager of the Sweden men's team. In 1998, after his second period as assistant manager of the national team, Grip took up a coaching position at the Italian club Lazio as the assistant of fellow Swedish manager Sven-Göran Eriksson.

In January 2001, when Eriksson was appointed England manager, he brought Grip with him from Lazio as assistant manager. Grip remained in the post until the end of the UEFA Euro 2004 and with England until the end of the 2006 FIFA World Cup. In November 2006, he was appointed special adviser to Swedish club Djurgården.

On 6 July 2007, Grip became part of the backroom staff of Manchester City when Sven-Göran Eriksson took over as manager. This reunited Grip with Eriksson after their reign together in the England setup. In June 2008, Grip was again reunited with Eriksson, after accepting an offer to become assistant manager of Mexico.

In April 2009, after Eriksson was fired by the Mexican Football Federation due to a bad string of results, Eriksson and Grip took up the positions of Director of Football and General Advisor to the Director of Football respectively at Notts County. Grip is currently a freelance senior squad scout for the Premier League side Southampton.

In February 2014, he was appointed as assistant manager of Kosovo.

== Style of management ==
Grip's tactics were inspired by those of English managers Bob Houghton and Roy Hodgson, who pioneered the 4–4–2 formation in Swedish football, and a zonal marking system, as well as heavy pressing. His style in turn influenced that of Sven-Göran Eriksson.

== Career statistics ==
=== International ===
Appearances and goals by national team and year
National team	Year	Apps	Goals
Sweden	1963	1	1
Sweden	1964	1	0
Sweden	1965	0	0
Sweden	1966	0	0
Sweden	1967	1	0
Total		3	1

Scores and results list Sweden's goal tally first, score column indicates score after each Grip goal.

List of international goals scored by Tord Grip
No.	Date	Venue	Opponent	Score	Result	Competition	Ref.
1	27 October 1963	Ullevi, Gothenburg, Sweden	Hungary	1–0	2–2	1964 Summer Olympics qualifying	

== Honours ==
=== Manager ===
Malmö

- Svenska Cupen: 1984

Sweden (assistant manager)

- FIFA World Cup third place: 1994

Lazio (assistant manager)

- Serie A: 1999–2000
