= Caspar Pauckstadt =

Swedish footballer

Personal information
- Full name: Caspar Pauckstadt
- Date of birth: 14 August 1964 (age 62)
- Position: Midfielder

Senior career*
Years	Team	Apps	(Gls)
1984–1989	Malmö FF	25	(4)
- * Club domestic league appearances and goals

Caspar Pauckstadt (born 14 August 1964) is a Swedish former footballer who played as a midfielder.
