= Henry Dahl =

Swedish footballer

Personal information
- Full name: Henry Dahl
- Position: Defender

Senior career*
Years	Team	Apps	(Gls)
1927–1933	Malmö FF	99	(1)
- * Club domestic league appearances and goals

Henry Dahl was a Swedish footballer who played as a defender.
