= Anders Karlsson (footballer) =

Swedish footballer (1963–2015)

Personal information
- Full name: Per Anders Mikael Karlsson
- Date of birth: 27 April 1963
- Date of death: 23 November 2015 (aged 52)
- Place of death: Hjälmaren, Sweden
- Position: Goalkeeper

Senior career*
Years	Team	Apps	(Gls)
1984–2002	Örebro SK		
2005	Örebro SK	0	(0)
2007	Örebro SK	0	(0)

Managerial career
- Örebro SK (goalk. coach)
- * Club domestic league appearances and goals

Per Anders Mikael Karlsson (27 April 1963 – 23 November 2015) was a Swedish football goalkeeper. He appeared in 413 games for Örebro SK, which is a club record. More than 200 of these games were in Allsvenskan.

== Personal life ==
He died in 2015 when speed skating at Hjälmaren, whereupon he went through the ice. His body was found in April 2016.
