= Ragnar Holmstedt =

Swedish footballer

Personal information
- Full name: Ragnar Holmstedt

Senior career*
Years	Team	Apps	(Gls)
1934–1937	Malmö FF	38	(1)
- * Club domestic league appearances and goals

Ragnar Holmstedt was a Swedish footballer.
