= Goethe Basin =

Crater on Mercury

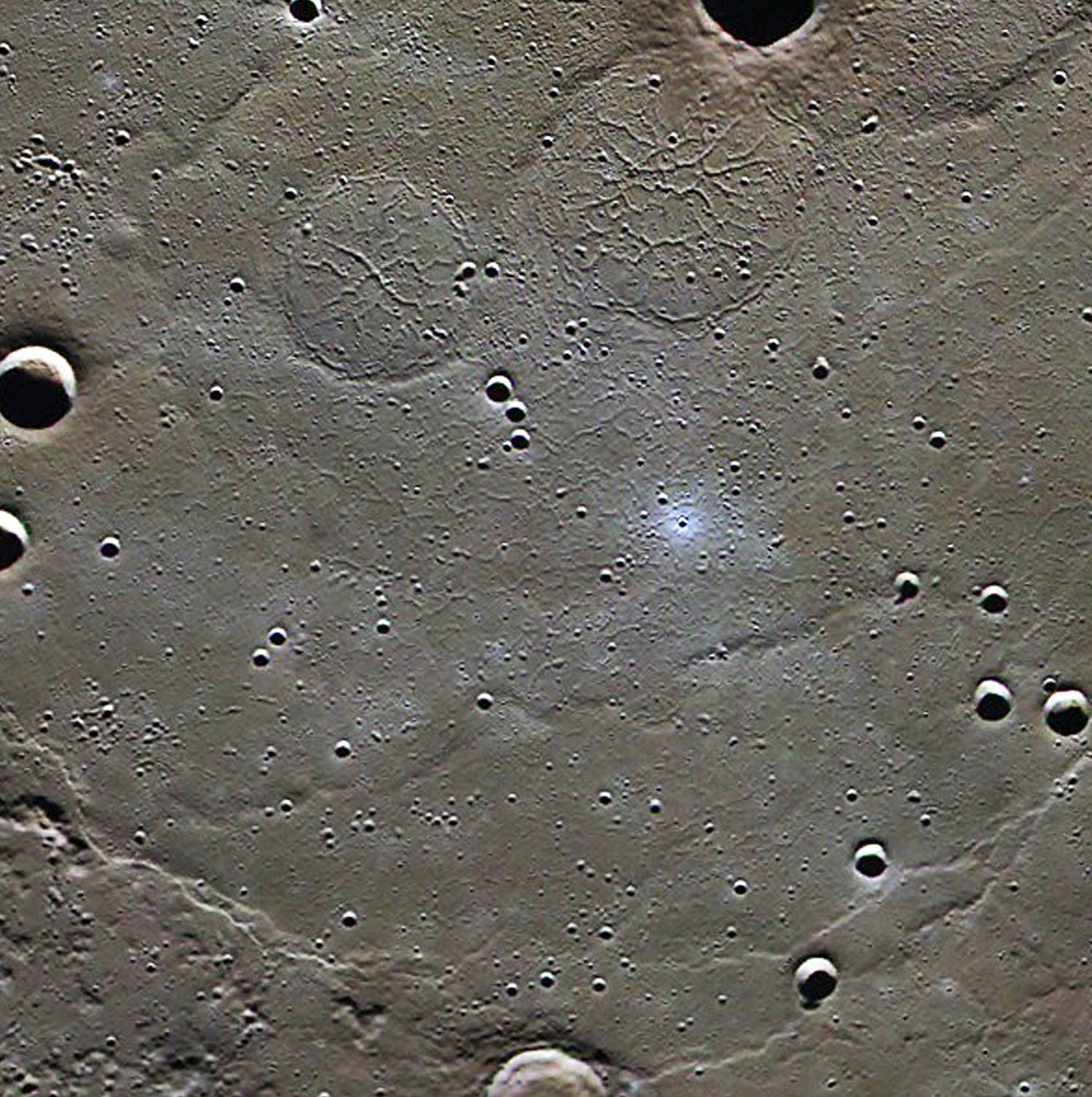
- Part of Goethe Basin (the rim is in the bottom). Two ghost craters with numerous grabens are seen near the top.
- Feature type: Impact crater
- Location: Borealis quadrangle, Mercury
- Coordinates: 81.4°N 54.3°W
- Diameter: 317.17 km (197.08 mi)
- Eponym: Johann Wolfgang von Goethe

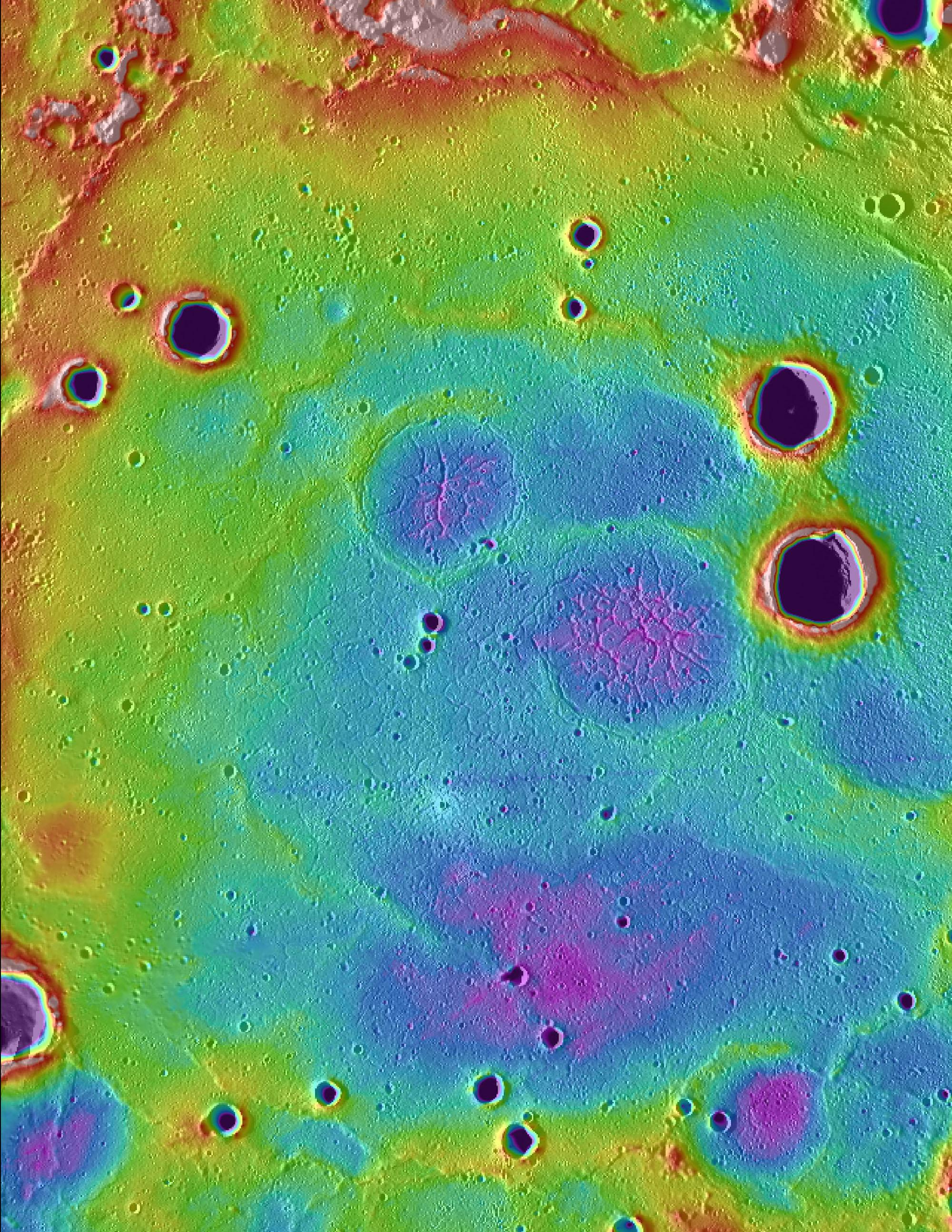
Goethe basin topography

Goethe Basin is an impact basin at 81.4° N, 54.3° W on Mercury approximately 317 kilometers in diameter. It was named in 1979 after German poet Johann Wolfgang von Goethe.

== Description ==
Goethe was not listed as an impact basin by Wood and Head because they considered the Mariner 10 photography too poor to confirm basin structures. However, most workers, beginning with Murray and others, have identified it as a basin. Goethe is bounded on its north and east sides by a gently sloping wall and discontinuous, low, hummocky rim material that may consist of ejecta deposits. These materials are similar to those occurring around the Caloris Basin in the Tolstoj quadrangle.

On its west side, Goethe is bounded by at least three subparallel ridges or tilted blocks, which are separated by narrow troughs partly filled with smooth plains material. If an inner concentric ring ever existed, it is buried under the smooth plains material that now extends across the basin. A narrow, concentric structural bench, in part resurfaced by smooth plains material, is recognizable at the base of a gently sloping and much degraded basin wall. Although rectilinear mountain massifs and the radially lineated facies of basin ejecta of the Caloris Group surround the Caloris Basin, similar units cannot be unambiguously recognized around the Goethe Basin (FDS 164). However, hilly and hummocky remnants resembling basin deposits and ejecta protrude above the gently sloping basin wall. They extend southwest and north of the basin beyond a much subdued, low, barely perceptible rim crest for a distance of one-half to one-third of the basin radius.

Goethe is older than the smooth plains material by which its wall, rim crest, and most of its ejecta were partly buried. The outlines of the rim crests of several adjacent craters are recognizable through the smooth plains material that partly fills the Goethe Basin. These buried craters probably were formed on the basin floor after excavation of the basin and were subsequently flooded to their rims by smooth plains material.

The terrain northwest of crater Despréz (located west of Goethe) is more hummocky than that farther south, suggesting that smooth plains material northwest of Despréz is so thin that the older and rougher topography of buried intercrater plains material protrudes through it. The density and size of ghost craters within the Goethe Basin are similar to those of the craters superposed over intercrater plains material near the terminator. These ghost craters and the original intercrater plains material they characterize are younger than the Goethe Basin, as they were not obliterated by the impact that formed it. Therefore, Goethe may have been formed by an impact onto a surface older than intercrater material and been partly filled by this material at a later date. If so, the Goethe impact basin may be older than some intercrater plains material and large craters nearby. It is also much older than the Caloris Basin.

The craters Angelou, Fuller, and Laxness lie within Goethe. The two prominent ghost craters are unnamed as of July 2020.

== See also ==
- 3047 Goethe, asteroid
