= Valdemar Wiberg =

Swedish footballer

Personal information
- Full name: Valdemar Wiberg
- Position: Goalkeeper

Senior career*
| Years | Team | Apps | (Gls) |
| 1925–1933 | Malmö FF | 92 | (0) |
- * Club domestic league appearances and goals

Valdemar Wiberg was a Swedish footballer who played as a goalkeeper.
