= Ove Ericsson =

Swedish footballer

Personal information
- Full name: Ove Ericsson
- Position: Forward

Senior career*
Years	Team	Apps	(Gls)
1939–1942	Malmö FF	30	(11)
- * Club domestic league appearances and goals

Ove Ericsson was a Swedish footballer who played as a forward.
