= Václav Simon =

Czech football manager

Personal information
- Date of birth: 30 June 1896
- Place of birth: German Empire
- Date of death: 1 November 1952 (aged 56)

Managerial career
- Years: Team
- 1936–1937: Malmö FF
- 1937–?: IS Halmia
- 1940–1944: AIK
- 1946: Vinbergs IF
- 1948: Halmstads BK
- Trelleborgs FF
- early 1950s: IFK Kristianstad

Václav Simon (30 June 1896 – 1 November 1952) was a Czech professional football manager active primarily in Sweden with Malmö FF, IS Halmia, AIK, Vinbergs IF, Halmstads BK and Trelleborgs FF. He also managed IFK Kristianstad.
