= Göte Strandsjö =

- Born: October 12, 1916; Malmö, Sweden
- Died: September 16, 2001 Skanör, Sweden
- Occupations: Singer, vocal teacher, professor, composer, author
- Spouse: Ingegerd Sjöbring (pianist)

Göte Strandsjö (born October 12, 1916, in Malmö, Sweden – died September 16, 2001, in Skanör, Sweden) was a singer, vocal teacher, professor at the Malmö Academy of Music, composer, and author. He was married to Ingegerd Sjöbring, a prominent pianist, and is buried at Skanörs kyrka cemetery.

== Biography ==
=== Early years ===
At the age of 15, Göte Strandsjö was accepted as a student at the Malmö Conservatory of Music after playing his own composition as an entrance exam. His first composition was made at the age of 7. He made his official soloist debut in a church concert as a replacement for his singing teacher Dag Westberg. In 1935, at the age of 19, he made his debut as a soloist in a larger context – a major student concert. This debut received praise from, among others, Sydsvenskan's Sten Broman. He later studied singing and rhythm pedagogy with Anna Behle and singing pedagogy with Adolf Fredrik Lindblad. He also studied singing and vocal pedagogy with Knut Vikrot. He studied counterpoint, composition, instrumentation, music theory, and harmony with Skåne composer John Fernström and Svea Nordblad-Welander (organist in Burlöv and teacher at the conservatory). He also studied organ with Svea Welander in Burlöv and obtained an organist and cantor diploma in Lund in 1938. During this time, he composed three orchestral compositions, all of which were performed by the Malmö Concert Hall Foundation Symphony Orchestra.

=== Conservatory ===
In 1948, Göte Strandsjö was engaged as a singing teacher (pedagogue) at the Conservatory of Music on the recommendation of his former singing teacher, Knut Vikrot. Strandsjö played a major role in building up the conservatory's activities and quality and served on the conservatory's and conservatory foundation's board for many years, becoming a respected member of the teaching staff. When the conservatory later became the Malmö Academy of Music, Göte Strandsjö became the head of the vocal pedagogy program and was appointed professor by the Swedish Government after consultation with the Royal Swedish Academy of Music. At the Conservatory and later at the Academy of Music, he taught choir singing and conducting from 1952 to 1958, speech technique/voice care from 1962 to 1967, singing methodology, children's choir methodology, school singing methodology, Orff methodology, and solo singing from 1959 to 1982. From 1965, he was in charge of the singing methodology program, and in 1975, he was appointed professor.

=== Filadelfiakyrkan ===
For many years, Göte Strandsjö served as organist and musical director at Filadelfiakyrkan in Malmö, where he established a mixed choir that was engaged by Sten Broman for larger performances with the Concert Hall Foundation Choir. He also initiated the Conservatory’s later Academy of Music choir and served as its first conductor.

== Work ==
=== Works ===
Among Strandsjö's larger orchestral works are a suite for saxophone and string orchestra, a suite for oboe and string orchestra written for Erik Löfgren, and a suite for guitar and string orchestra written for the guitarist Ewert Allander. Strandsjö also wrote inventions, fugues, and sonatinas. He also composed several major works for choir and orchestra, including "Så älskade Gud världen," which was premiered at Linköping Cathedral. He composed his first composition at the age of 8, and it was followed by a rich production of solo songs, string music songs, choral songs, and larger orchestral works. He also composed a large number of songs with texts by, among others, Nils Ferlin, Anders Frostenson, Bo Setterlind, Sven Lidman, Gabriel Jönsson, Pär Lagerkvist, Britt G Hallqvist, Kerstin Anér, Jan Arvid Hellström, Don Helder Camara, and Inge Löfström. He also composed several commissioned works and wrote texts for his compositions as well as texts for other melodies. Among others, he wrote the lyrics for "En ton från himlen" (A Tone from Heaven) to the melody of Amazing Grace. This text was a commissioned work for the artist Anna-Lena Löfgren. In 1968, Göte Strandsjö published a course book on classical guitar playing, which was later complemented with subsequent teacher's instructions and practice pieces by Per Olof Johansson.

In his musical creations, Göte Strandsjö drew inspiration from various sources. One person who played a major role for Göte Strandsjö in finding "his own tone in his songs" was his friend, music director, and composer Karl-Erik Svedlund. In some works – especially the larger ones but also in certain songs and ballads – one can sense influences from Carl Nielsen. Like Nielsen, Göte Strandsjö was rooted in the Nordic folk tunes, which is evident in many of his songs and ballads. Göte Strandsjö was also fond of English and American music, and jazz was not foreign to him. He also extensively studied Chinese, African, and Jewish music, as well as Romani (Gypsy) music.

Regarding the newer, contemporary spiritual ballads, Göte Strandsjö, along with, among others, the priest and ballad poet Tore Littmark, were pioneering and dominant personalities in this genre. In this context, he collaborated, among others, with the folk singer, theology professor, and bishop Jan-Arvid Hellström. Strandsjö had extensive connections with the cultural Sweden, and among his circle of friends were authors such as Tomas Tranströmer.

Göte Strandsjö's works are included in, among others, Den svenska psalmboken 1986 (The Swedish Psalm Book 1986), including Verbums psalmbokstillägg 2003 (Verbum's Psalm Book Supplement 2003) with an original text and its musical setting (no. 774) and an additional musical setting (no. 684). His works are also found in several other hymnbooks, such as Frälsningsarméns sångbok 1990 (The Salvation Army Songbook 1990), Psalmer och Sånger 1987 (Psalms and Songs 1987), and Segertoner 1988. A large part of his production, which includes several thousand compositions and arrangements of various formats and styles, has been published by various publishers. Approximately 600 of Göte Strandsjö's works are registered with STIM (the Swedish Performing Rights Society).

Around 164 gramophone records with Göte Strandsjö as a participant or featuring his songs/music have been released in Sweden. Artists who performed Strandsjö's music include Erland Hagegård, Karin Mang Habashi, Östen Warnerbring, Bo Ohlgren, Christer Sjögren, Anna-Lena Löfgren, Artur Erikson, Göran Stenlund, and Jan Sparring.

=== Appearances on TV and Radio ===
Göte Strandsjö was also a well-known radio and TV personality for many years. He participated in or made around 90 radio programs and around 50 TV programs. One of the most famous TV programs was "Sång på gång" (Singing on the Go) with Göte Strandsjö and Bengt Roslund as hosts, featuring the NU Choir as the studio choir. Several contemporary cultural personalities – actors, authors, singers – were guests on these programs, which were broadcast on SVT from 1978 to 1984. Göte Strandsjö was also active as a music-literature reviewer and columnist in several newspapers, and he authored several books.

For many years, Göte Strandsjö had a music program on Sveriges Radio (Swedish Radio), and he became a TV personality when he appeared in numerous TV programs with his choir, the NU Choir, consisting of young music and singing students. With this choir, he embarked on several tours both in Sweden and abroad. As a soloist, Göte Strandsjö held worship services and concerts throughout the country, and when the remains of UN Secretary-General Dag Hammarskjöld arrived in Malmö, Göte Strandsjö performed as a soloist, singing from the balcony of the Residency in front of about 50,000 people.

== Works ==
=== Songs ===
- Gud vet vad jag heter (FA no. 545, Herren Lever 1977 no. 904) text and music 1975
- Gud, du är här (P&S no. 439) 1974
- Jag var modfälld och trött (Segertoner no. 476)
- Jesus, min herde, har omsorg om mig (Segertoner no. 361)
- Min hjälp kommer från Herren (P&S no. 631, Herren Lever 1977 no. 907) text and music 1967. 1986's hymnbook has a different musical setting
- Som när ett barn kommer hem om kvällen (FA no. 592) text and music 1967

=== Compositions ===
- Han kom från ett främmande land (Herren Lever 1977 no. 897) composed in 1970
- Lova Herren, min själ (1986 no. 684) composed in 1968
- Är Guds kärlek såsom havet (P&S no. 367, Herren Lever 1977) composed in 1960

=== Bibliography ===
- Drömmen om en sång (The Dream of a Song), Strandsjö, Göte, Harriers förlag, Vällingby, 1978.
- "Mellan speglar" (Between Mirrors) Göte Strandsjö, Harriers förlag 1980
- "Att komma hem" (Coming Home) Göte Strandsjö, Harriers Förlag 1983
- "Alla träd har rötter, en raposodi om människan mitt i världen" (All Trees Have Roots, a Rhapsody on Humanity in the World) Göte Strandsjö. Libris förlag 1985
- "Från en annan sida" (From Another Side) Göte Strandsjö. Libris förlag 1987
- "Fragment ur två människors liv" (Fragments from Two People's Lives). Göte Strandsjö. Libris Förlag 1989
- "Batseba, Jungman Jansson och andra småstycken" (Bathsheba, Jungman Jansson, and Other Short Pieces). Göte Strandsjö. Verbums förlag 1992
- "En sten i skon, samlade kåserier" (A Pebble in the Shoe, Collected Essays) KM-förlaget 1995

== Honors ==
- Dewerthska kulturstiftelsens stipendium (The Dewerth Cultural Foundation Scholarship) and diploma 1965
- Swedish State Artist Scholarship 1965
- Malmö City Cultural Scholarship 1969
- Personal professorship 1976
- Litteris et Artibus (Literature and Art) 1982
- Malmö City Cultural Scholarship 1985
- SKAP's scholarship for distinguished achievements 1985
