= Doug Stromback =

American ice hockey player (born 1967)

- Born: March 2, 1967 (age 59) Farmington, MI, USA
- Height: 6 ft 1 in (185 cm)
- Weight: 195 lb (88 kg; 13 st 13 lb)
- Position: Right Wing
- Shot: Right
- Played for: Bakersfield Fog; Erie Panthers; Flint Spirits; Huntington Blizzard; Johnstown Chiefs; Memphis Riverkings; Motor City Snipers; Muskegon Fury; Tulsa Oilers; Utica Blizzard
- NHL draft: 124th overall, 1985; Washington Capitals
- Playing career: 1988–2004

Douglas Alan Stromback (born March 3, 1967) is an American retired ice hockey right winger who played over 380 regular season and playoff games across several minor hockey leagues. Stromback was drafted in the sixth round of the 1985 NHL entry draft, selected 124th overall, by the Washington Capitals.

== Career ==
Stromback was invited to Detroit Red Wings training camp in 1988, but was eventually reassigned to their AHL affiliate on September 20, 1988. After arriving in Erie for the 1988-89 ECHL season, Stromback scored a career-high 40 goals in 50 games, which earned him a spot on the 1988-89 All-ECHL Team.

Stromback's younger brother Richard also played professional hockey. Both Doug and Richard played professional hockey for the Erie Panthers during the 1989-90 ECHL season.

== Personal ==
Once he retired from hockey, Stromback attended Brandon University in Brandon, Manitoba, and received a Bachelor of Arts in Business Administration in 1995.

After his graduation, Stromback became an investor and board member of Web Group. Stromback later started a career in structured finance. Over the course of five years, he became a top executive with over $500 million in transactions.

== Career statistics ==
			Regular season					Playoffs
Season	Team	League	GP	G	A	Pts	PIM	GP	G	A	Pts	PIM
1984–85	Kitchener Rangers	OHL	66	20	24	44	48	4	2	1	3	0
1985–86	Kitchener Rangers	OHL	13	7	10	17	13	—	—	—	—	—
1985–86	North Bay Centennials	OHL	50	19	22	41	50	10	0	0	0	14
1986–87	North Bay Centennials	OHL	24	10	13	23	13	—	—	—	—	—
1986–87	Belleville Bulls	OHL	41	22	33	55	10	6	2	2	4	10
1987–88	Belleville Bulls	OHL	60	27	35	62	19	5	3	0	3	4
1988–89	Flint Spirits	IHL	2	0	0	0	0	—	—	—	—	—
1988–89	Johnstown Chiefs	ECHL	3	0	2	2	0	—	—	—	—	—
1988–89	Erie Panthers	ECHL	50	40	43	83	77	4	0	2	2	0
1989–90	Erie Panthers	ECHL	53	23	43	66	16	7	4	5	9	0
1990–91	Erie Panthers	ECHL	24	14	15	29	25	5	4	2	6	0
1993–94	Muskegon Fury	CoHL	39	13	12	25	19	—	—	—	—	—
1993–94	Huntington Blizzard	ECHL	23	2	4	6	30	—	—	—	—	—
1994–95	Utica Blizzard	CoHL	6	2	3	5	8	—	—	—	—	—
1994–95	Tulsa Oilers	CHL	27	9	10	19	19	—	—	—	—	—
1994–95	Memphis RiverKings	CHL	6	5	4	9	6	—	—	—	—	—
1995–96	Memphis RiverKings	CHL	60	26	38	64	73	6	0	1	1	6
1996–97	Memphis RiverKings	CHL	58	21	31	52	53	—	—	—	—	—
1996–97	Tulsa Oilers	CHL	7	3	6	9	6	5	0	2	2	0
1997–98	Bakersfield Fog	WCHL	1	0	1	1	0	—	—	—	—	—
ECHL totals			153	79	107	186	148	16	8	9	17	0
CHL totals			158	64	89	153	157	11	0	3	3	6
