= Lennart Askerlund =

Swedish footballer

Personal information
- Full name: Lennart Askerlund
- Date of birth: 9 July 1918
- Place of birth: Eskilstuna, Sweden
- Date of death: 2 July 1957 (aged 38)
- Place of death: Norrköping, Sweden
- Position: Forward

Senior career*
Years	Team	Apps	(Gls)
1931–1939	IFK Eskilstuna		
1940–1942	Malmö FF	35	(6)
1942–1944	AIK	43	(14)
1945–1951	IFK Eskilstuna		
- * Club domestic league appearances and goals

Lennart Askerlund (9 July 1918 – 2 July 1957) was a Swedish footballer who played as a forward.
