= Sune Andersson (Malmö FF footballer) =

Swedish footballer

Personal information
- Full name: Sune Andersson
- Position: Forward

Senior career*
| Years | Team | Apps | (Gls) |
| 1935–1939 | Malmö FF | 44 | (10) |
- * Club domestic league appearances and goals

Sune Andersson was a Swedish footballer who played as a forward.
