= Roland Löwegren =

Swedish footballer

Personal information
- Full name: Roland Löwegren
- Position: Defender

Senior career*
Years	Team	Apps	(Gls)
1962–1968	Malmö FF	44	(0)
- * Club domestic league appearances and goals

Roland Löwegren is a Swedish former footballer who played as a defender.
