= 3047 Goethe =

Main-belt asteroid

Discovery
- Discovered by: C. J. van Houten; I. van Houten G. T. Gehrels
- Discovery site: Palomar Obs.
- Discovery date: 24 September 1960

Designations
- Named after: Johann Wolfgang von Goethe (German poet)
- Alternative designations: 6091 P-L · 1969 UG; 1976 JU_{6} · 1982 VO
- Minor planet category: main-belt · (middle) background

Orbital characteristics
- Epoch 23 March 2018 (JD 2458200.5)
- Uncertainty parameter 0
- Observation arc: 57.34 yr (20,943 d)
- Aphelion: 2.7144 AU
- Perihelion: 2.5698 AU
- Semi-major axis: 2.6421 AU
- Eccentricity: 0.0274
- Orbital period (sidereal): 4.29 yr (1,569 d)
- Mean anomaly: 103.04°
- Mean motion: 0° 13^{m} 46.2^{s} / day
- Inclination: 1.6105°
- Longitude of ascending node: 317.26°
- Argument of perihelion: 78.267°

Physical characteristics
- Mean diameter: 5.846±0.117 km
- Geometric albedo: 0.362±0.052
- Absolute magnitude (H): 12.9

3047 Goethe, provisional designation 6091 P-L, is a bright background asteroid from the central regions of the asteroid belt, approximately 6 kilometers (3.7 miles) in diameter. It was discovered on 24 September 1960, by Dutch astronomer couple Ingrid and Cornelis van Houten on photographic plates taken by Dutch–American astronomer Tom Gehrels at the Palomar Observatory in California, United States. The asteroid was named after German poet Johann Wolfgang von Goethe.

== Orbit and classification ==
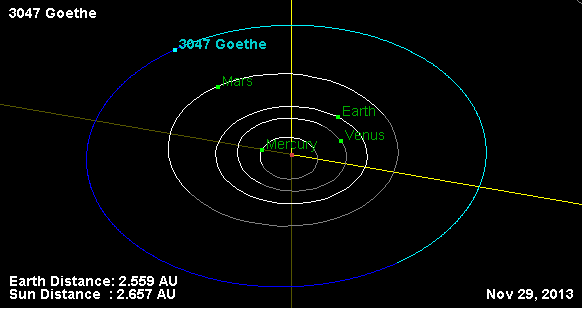
Orbital diagram of Goethe

Goethe is a non-family asteroid of the main belt's background population. It orbits the Sun in the central asteroid belt at a distance of 2.6–2.7 AU once every 4 years and 3 months (1,569 days; semi-major axis of 2.64 AU). Its orbit has a low eccentricity of 0.03 and a low inclination of 2° with respect to the ecliptic. The body's observation arc begins with its official discovery observation at Palomar in September 1960. In May 2156, it will pass at a distance of 7,440,000 km (0.0497 AU) from the asteroid 29 Amphitrite at a relative velocity of 1.66 km/s.

== Physical characteristics ==
According to the survey carried out by the NEOWISE mission of NASA's Wide-field Infrared Survey Explorer, Goethe measures 5.846 kilometers in diameter and its surface has a notably high albedo of 0.362. As of 2018, no rotational lightcurve of Goethe has been obtained from photometric observations. The body's rotation period, pole and shape remain unknown.

== Palomar–Leiden survey ==
The survey designation "P-L" stands for Palomar–Leiden, named after Palomar Observatory and Leiden Observatory, which collaborated on the fruitful Palomar–Leiden survey in the 1960s. Gehrels used Palomar's Samuel Oschin telescope (also known as the 48-inch Schmidt Telescope), and shipped the photographic plates to Ingrid and Cornelis van Houten at Leiden Observatory where astrometry was carried out. The trio are credited with the discovery of several thousand asteroid discoveries.

== Naming ==
This minor planet was named after German poet and playwright Johann Wolfgang von Goethe (1749-1832). The official naming citation was published by the Minor Planet Center on 29 September 1985 (M.P.C. 10045). The Goethe Basin on Mercury was also named in his honor.
