= Richard Stromback =

American businessman

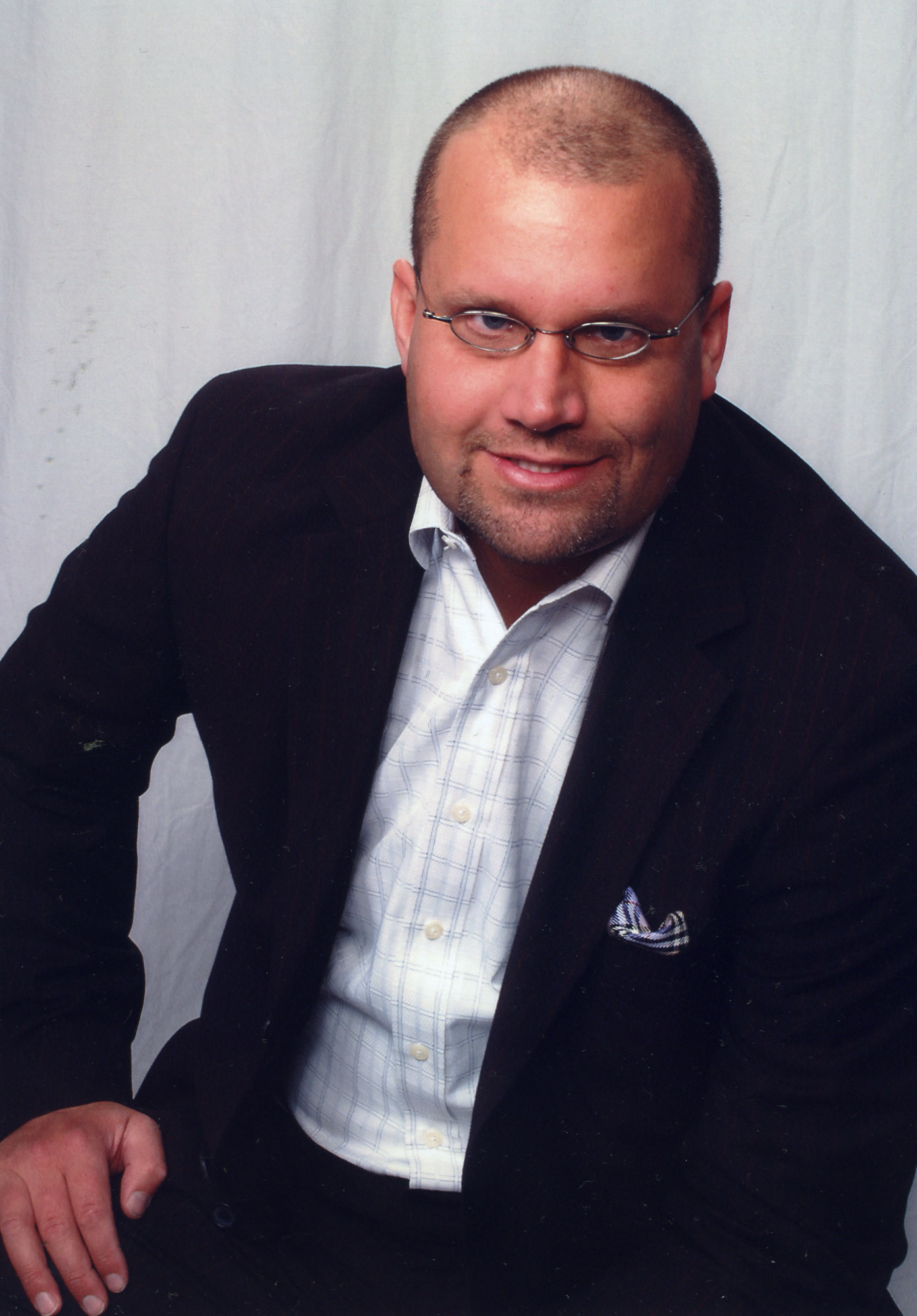
- Richard "Ultimate Davos" Stromback
- Born: January 29, 1969 (age 57)
- Occupations: Former minor league ice hockey player, entrepreneur and venture capitalist

Richard Stromback (born January 29, 1969) is an American former minor-league hockey player (OHL, ECHL), venture capitalist and entrepreneur. In 1997 he founded Web Group, a technology staffing firm and served as its CEO and President until 2003. During this time, Web Group ranked 189th on Inc.Magazine's annual list of the 500 fastest-growing companies. In 2003, he shifted his investment focus to clean technology, acquiring the research firm Ecology Coatings.

Stromback has been referred to as the "Ultimate Davos", primarily due to a large number of influential contacts, in reference to the annual meeting of the world's elite in Davos, Switzerland. His 40th birthday received media coverage for both its excess and attendance from billionaires and royalty to political figures, and leaders of the corporate and financial world. He was named a Technology Pioneer and Young Global Leader by the World Economic Forum and one of the top "40 Under 40" business leaders by Crain's Business.

== Early life ==
Born to Jessie Alinda Stromback and Theodore David Stromback in Redford, Michigan, he left home at the age of seventeen to pursue a hockey career. Stromback has five siblings, three brothers and two sisters. His brother Doug Stromback was also a professional hockey player, drafted by the Washington Capitals. He is of Finnish, Swedish and Scottish heritage/descent.

== Hockey career ==
Stromback played hockey from 1986 through 1990 when he suffered a blowout fracture of his left orbit during a fight. During those years he played in the Ontario Hockey League and the East Coast Hockey League with the North Bay Centennials, Belleville Bulls, Cornwall Royals, Erie Panthers and the Johnstown Chiefs.

Stromback's reputation was as an enforcer and he had fights with such notables as Tie Domi, Bob Boughner and Dennis Vial.

== Web Group ==
In 1997, Stromback founded the Web Group, an IT staffing and search firm, and assumed the role of CEO and President. Web Group saw a period of outstanding growth between 1997 & 2002 and in 2002, was ranked 189th on the annual list of 500 fastest-growing companies by Inc. magazine. In 2002, Stromback sold Web Group to Arrow Strategies for an undisclosed amount.

== Ecology Coatings, Inc. ==
In 2003, Stromback bought controlling interest in Ecology Coating, Inc., a clean technology research and development firm. He assumed the role of the CEO and guided the company from being a research lab to product commercialization. Richard Stromback focused on corporate strategy to build upon the momentum generated by the company since it was founded.

== Business ventures ==
=== Stromback Ventures ===
Stromback Ventures is a mentor capital firm founded by Richard Stromback. The firm offers mentors and guidance to support the development and commercialization of early-stage technologies.

=== Stromback Global Advisors ===
Stromback Global Advisors is a consultancy firm that develops strategic business relationships for its clients. Their efforts are aimed at connecting their clients to global leaders and decision makers in the fields of business, finance and politics, from around the world.

=== World Leader Summits ===
Stromback is a regular name on the guest list of many major international gatherings of world leaders. He is a frequent visitor to global events such as the World Economic Forum, the Milken Institute as well as the Clinton Global Initiative. Recently he has started hosting exclusive gatherings of leaders who are focused on addressing climate change. In March 2008, he served as co-host of the Ecology Summit with Sir Richard Branson on Necker Island.

== The Stromback Foundation ==
The Stromback Foundation is a private, non-profit foundation dedicated to the advancement, understanding, development and application of sustainable green technologies for the removal and control of environmental risks to human health in impoverished communities.

=== Initiatives ===
The Stromback Foundation has devoted a significant amount of time and effort towards the use of Green Building Standards in New Orleans after the destruction caused by Hurricane Katrina, and is a vocal supporter of contributions to the discussions on Green Energy.

== Awards and achievements ==
In 2006, Stromback was the recipient of the Technology Pioneer Award for his work with Ecology Coatings. The award is given by the World Economic Forum to persons with outstanding contributions towards the promotion of designing and developing new technologies. In 2007, he was named a Young Global Leader which identifies leaders from all over the world under the age of 40, for their outstanding contribution to corporate and social efforts worldwide. In 2008 Stromback was the recipient of Crains Business ’40 Under 40’ award, given to individuals demonstrating phenomenal performance and contributions to their organizations and career. Stromback was recognized for his award-winning success with Web Group as well as his endeavours with Ecology Coatings.
