= Bengt Fröjd =

Swedish footballer

Personal information
- Full name: Bengt Fröjd
- Position: Forward

Senior career*
Years	Team	Apps	(Gls)
1956–1963	Malmö FF	56	(3)
- * Club domestic league appearances and goals

Bengt Fröjd is a Swedish former footballer who played as a forward.
