= Göte Dahl =

Swedish footballer

Personal information
- Full name: Göte Dahl
- Position: Forward

Senior career*
Years	Team	Apps	(Gls)
1931–1938	Malmö FF	62	(27)
- * Club domestic league appearances and goals

Göte Dahl was a Swedish footballer who played as a forward. for the Malmö FF
