= Deval Eminovski =

Swedish former footballer

Personal information
- Full name: Deval Eminovski
- Date of birth: 15 October 1964 (age 62)
- Place of birth: Resen, SFR Yugoslavia
- Position: Midfielder

Senior career*
Years	Team	Apps	(Gls)
1984–1988	Malmö FF	49	(4)

International career
1984–1986	Sweden U21	19	(1)
- * Club domestic league appearances and goals

Deval Eminovski (born 15 October 1964) is a Swedish former footballer who played as a midfielder. He appeared 19 times for the Sweden U21 team.
