= Göte Malm =

Swedish footballer

Personal information
- Full name: Göte Malm
- Position: Midfielder

Senior career*
Years	Team	Apps	(Gls)
1940–1942	Malmö FF	32	(6)
- * Club domestic league appearances and goals

Göte Malm was a Swedish footballer who played as a midfielder.

== See also ==
- List of Malmö FF players
