= Rickard Strömbäck =

Swedish footballer

Personal information
- Full name: Rickard Strömbäck
- Position: Defender

Senior career*
Years	Team	Apps	(Gls)
1979–1984	Malmö FF	101	(1)
- * Club domestic league appearances and goals

Rickard Strömbäck is Swedish former footballer who played as a defender.
