= Carl Ahlberg =

Swedish football player and manager

Personal information
- Full name: Carl Ahlberg
- Place of birth: Sweden

Senior career*
Years	Team	Apps	(Gls)
1928–1932	Malmö FF	50	(4)

Managerial career
- 1942–1944: Malmö FF
- * Club domestic league appearances and goals

Carl Ahlberg was a Swedish football player and manager. He played for and managed Malmö FF.
