= Göte Rosengren =

Swedish footballer

Personal information
- Full name: Göte Rosengren
- Position: Defender

Senior career*
Years	Team	Apps	(Gls)
1935–1941	Malmö FF	52	(1)
- * Club domestic league appearances and goals

Göte Rosengren was a Swedish footballer who played as a defender.
