= 1936–37 in Swedish football =

The 1936–37 season in Swedish football, starting August 1936 and ending July 1937:

== Honours ==
=== Official titles ===
Title	Team	Reason
1936–37 Swedish Champions	AIK	Winners of Allsvenskan

=== Competitions ===
Level	Competition	Team
1st level	Allsvenskan 1936–37	AIK
2nd level	Division 2 Norra 1936–37	IK Brage
2nd level	Division 2 Östra 1936–37	Hammarby IF
2nd level	Division 2 Västra 1936–37	Degerfors IF
2nd level	Division 2 Södra 1936–37	Helsingborgs IF
Regional Championship	Norrländska Mästerskapet 1937	Bodens BK

== Promotions, relegations and qualifications ==
=== Promotions ===
Promoted from	Promoted to	Team	Reason
Division 2 Norra 1936–37	Allsvenskan 1937–38	IK Brage	Winners of promotion play-off
Division 2 Södra 1936–37	Allsvenskan 1937–38	Helsingborgs IF	Winners of promotion play-off
Division 3 1936–37	Division 2 Norra 1937–38	Sundbybergs IK	Winners of Östsvenska
Division 3 1936–37	Division 2 Norra 1937–38	Skutskärs IF	Winners of promotion play-off
Division 3 1936–37	Division 2 Östra 1937–38	Katrineholms AIK	Winners of Mellansvenska
Division 3 1936–37	Division 2 Östra 1937–38	Motala AIF	Winners of Södra Mellansvenska
Division 3 1936–37	Division 2 Västra 1937–38	Arvika BK	Winners of Nordvästra
Division 3 1936–37	Division 2 Södra 1937–38	IFK Trelleborg	Winners of Sydsvenska
Division 3 1936–37	Division 2 Södra 1937–38	IFK Värnamo	Winners of Sydöstra
Division 3 1936–37	Division 2 Södra 1937–38	Varbergs BoIS	Winners of promotion play-off

=== League transfers ===
Transferred from	Transferred to	Team	Reason
Division 2 Östra 1936–37	Division 2 Norra 1937–38	Hammarby IF	Geographical composition
Division 2 Östra 1936–37	Division 2 Norra 1937–38	Reymersholms IK	Geographical composition
Division 2 Östra 1936–37	Division 2 Norra 1937–38	Värtans IK	Geographical composition
Division 2 Norra 1936–37	Division 2 Östra 1937–38	Hallstahammars SK	Geographical composition
Division 2 Norra 1936–37	Division 2 Östra 1937–38	Surahammars IF	Geographical composition
Division 2 Norra 1936–37	Division 2 Östra 1937–38	IFK Västerås	Geographical composition
Division 2 Östra 1936–37	Division 2 Västra 1937–38	IK Tord	Geographical composition

=== Relegations ===
Relegated from	Relegated to	Team	Reason
Allsvenskan 1936–37	Division 2 Norra 1937–38	Djurgårdens IF	11th team
Allsvenskan 1936–37	Division 2 Östra 1937–38	IFK Norrköping	12th team
Division 2 Norra 1936–37	Division 3 1937–38	IF Rune	9th team
Division 2 Norra 1936–37	Division 3 1937–38	Fagersta AIK	10th team
Division 2 Östra 1936–37	Division 3 1937–38	Husqvarna IF	9th team
Division 2 Östra 1936–37	Division 3 1937–38	Årsta SK	10th team
Division 2 Västra 1936–37	Division 3 1937–38	IFK Örebro	9th team
Division 2 Västra 1936–37	Division 3 1937–38	IFK Kristinehamn	10th team
Division 2 Södra 1936–37	Division 3 1937–38	Ängelholms IF	9th team
Division 2 Södra 1936–37	Division 3 1937–38	Växjö BK	10th team

== Domestic results ==
=== Allsvenskan 1936–37 ===

	Team	Pld	W	D	L	GF		GA	GD	Pts
1	AIK	22	17	2	3	59	–	24	+35	36
2	IK Sleipner	22	12	3	7	45	–	41	+4	27
3	Örgryte IS	22	10	5	7	45	–	32	+13	25
4	Sandvikens IF	22	12	1	9	46	–	34	+12	25
5	IF Elfsborg	22	10	4	8	41	–	33	+8	24
6	Malmö FF	22	9	3	10	39	–	45	-6	21
7	IFK Göteborg	22	8	5	9	34	–	40	-6	21
8	GAIS	22	9	3	10	27	–	36	-9	21
9	Landskrona BoIS	22	9	1	12	33	–	42	-9	19
10	Gårda BK	22	6	6	10	30	–	44	-14	18
11	Djurgårdens IF	22	6	2	14	39	–	52	-13	14
12	IFK Norrköping	22	5	3	14	31	–	46	-15	13

=== Allsvenskan promotion play-off 1936–37 ===
June 6, 1937

IK Brage	2–0	Hammarby IF

?, Borlänge
June 11, 1937

Hammarby IF	2–5	IK Brage

?, Stockholm

June 6, 1937

Helsingborgs IF	4–1	Degerfors IF

?, Helsingborg
June 13, 1937

Degerfors IF	1–3	Helsingborgs IF

?, Degerfors

=== Division 2 Norra 1936–37 ===

	Team	Pld	W	D	L	GF		GA	GD	Pts
1	IK Brage	18	16	1	1	70	–	21	+49	33
2	Ljusne AIK	18	8	5	5	25	–	20	+5	21
3	Gefle IF	18	8	5	5	35	–	31	+4	21
4	IFK Västerås	18	7	6	5	41	–	36	+5	20
5	Hallstahammars SK	18	8	3	7	42	–	29	+13	19
6	IFK Grängesberg	18	7	4	7	39	–	37	+2	18
7	Surahammars IF	18	6	6	6	35	–	34	+1	18
8	Bollnäs GIF	18	5	7	6	25	–	28	-3	16
9	IF Rune	18	2	3	13	26	–	62	-36	7
10	Fagersta AIK	18	2	2	14	22	–	65	-43	6

=== Division 2 Östra 1936–37 ===
	Team	Pld	W	D	L	GF		GA	GD	Pts
1	Hammarby IF	18	9	7	2	33	–	21	+12	25
2	IK Tord	18	8	5	5	42	–	33	+9	21
3	BK Derby	18	7	6	5	37	–	23	+14	20
4	Skärblacka IF	18	8	4	6	36	–	31	+5	20
5	Reymersholms IK	18	9	2	7	39	–	35	+4	20
6	IFK Eskilstuna	18	7	3	8	46	–	33	+13	17
7	Värtans IK	18	6	5	7	20	–	24	-4	17
8	Mjölby AI	18	6	4	8	32	–	40	-8	16
9	Husqvarna IF	18	4	5	9	25	–	42	-17	13
10	Årsta SK	18	3	5	10	21	–	49	-28	11

=== Division 2 Västra 1936–37 ===
	Team	Pld	W	D	L	GF		GA	GD	Pts
1	Degerfors IF	18	14	2	2	62	–	29	+33	30
2	Karlskoga IF	18	12	2	4	46	–	20	+26	26
3	Alingsås IF	18	7	5	6	37	–	28	+9	19
4	Billingsfors IK	18	8	2	8	35	–	30	+5	18
5	Tidaholms GIF	18	6	5	7	27	–	32	-5	17
6	Jonsereds IF	18	5	7	6	27	–	34	-7	17
7	Karlstads BIK	18	6	3	9	26	–	34	-8	15
8	Fässbergs IF	18	6	2	10	29	–	39	-10	14
9	IFK Örebro	18	5	2	11	25	–	47	-22	12
10	IFK Kristinehamn	18	5	2	11	20	–	41	-21	12

=== Division 2 Södra 1936–37 ===
	Team	Pld	W	D	L	GF		GA	GD	Pts
1	Helsingborgs IF	18	12	4	2	52	–	16	+36	28
2	Halmstads BK	18	11	4	3	46	–	14	+32	26
3	Höganäs BK	18	10	4	4	40	–	29	+11	24
4	Malmö BI	18	9	3	6	40	–	32	+8	21
5	BK Landora	18	7	4	7	30	–	29	+1	18
6	IFK Kristianstad	18	8	2	8	48	–	48	0	18
7	IFK Helsingborg	18	7	2	9	35	–	35	0	16
8	IS Halmia	18	6	2	10	27	–	36	-9	14
9	Ängelholms IF	18	5	3	10	27	–	52	-25	13
10	Växjö BK	18	1	0	17	16	–	70	-54	2

=== Division 2 promotion play-off 1936–37 ===
June 6, 1937

Strands IF	2–1	Skutskärs IF

?, ?
June 13, 1937

Skutskärs IF	3–1	Strands IF

?, ?
June 18, 1937

Skutskärs IF	2–1	Strands IF

?, ?

June 6, 1937

Kinna IF	2–3	Varbergs BoIS

?, ?
June 13, 1937

Varbergs BoIS	2–1	Kinna IF

?, ?

=== Norrländska Mästerskapet 1937 ===
Final

July 25, 1937

Bodens BK	3–2	Sandviks IK

Bandyvallen, Boden

== National team results ==
August 4, 1936
1936 Olympics
1st round (1/8 final)
№ 201

Japan	3–2	Sweden
Kamo 49'; Ukon 62'; Matsunaga 85'		Persson 24', 37'

Hertha Platz, Berlin
Attendance: 3,000
Referee: Peters (Germany)

Sweden: Sven Bergquist - Otto Andersson, Erik Källström - Victor Carlund, Arvid Emanuelsson, Torsten Johansson - Gustaf Josefsson, Erik Persson, Sven Jonasson, Karl-Erik Grahn, Åke Hallman.

September 27, 1936
1933–36 Nordic Championship
№ 202

Finland	1–2	Sweden
Kanerva 85' (p)		Jonasson 44'; Ericsson 50'

Tölö bollplan, Helsinki
Attendance: 13,000
Referee: Daehlen (Norway)

Sweden: Sven Bergquist - Nils Axelsson, Walter Sköld - Fritz Berg, Arvid Emanuelsson, Ernst Andersson - Bertil Ericsson, Erik Persson, Sven Jonasson, Karl-Erik Grahn, Andreas Nilsson.

May 17, 1937
Friendly
№ 203

Sweden	0–4	England
		Steele 7', 13', 37'; Johnson 34'

Råsunda, Solna
Attendance: 34,119
Referee: Langenus (Belgium)

Sweden: Gustav Sjöberg - Nils Axelsson, Walter Sköld - Fritz Berg, Sven Andersson, Ernst Andersson - Gustaf Josefsson, Erik Persson, Sven Jonasson, Karl-Erik Grahn, Axel Nilsson.

June 16, 1937
1938 World Cup qualification,
1937–47 Nordic Championship
№ 204

Sweden	4–0	Finland
Bunke 60', 82'; Persson 65'; Svanström 68'

Råsunda, Solna
Attendance: 19,548
Referee: Daehlen (Norway)

Sweden: Gustav Sjöberg - Valter Lundgren, Olle Källgren - Kurt Svanström, Gunnar Löfgren, Ernst Andersson - Gustaf Josefsson, Erik Persson, Olle Zetherlund, Lennart Bunke, Axel Nilsson.

June 20, 1937
1938 World Cup qualification
№ 205

Sweden	7–2	Estonia
Josefsson 7', 41'; Bunke 40'; Jonasson 49' (p); Wetterström 73, 77', 84'		Siimenson 2'; Uukkivi 3'

Råsunda, Solna
Attendance: 18,421
Referee: Remke (Denmark)

Sweden: Gustav Sjöberg - Valter Lundgren, Olle Källgren - Erik Almgren, Gunnar Löfgren, Kurt Svanström - Gustaf Josefsson, Sven Jonasson, Bertil Ericsson, Lennart Bunke, Gustav Wetterström.

June 23, 1937
Friendly
№ 206

Poland	3–1	Sweden
Wodarz 12'; Piątek 24'; Wilimowski 60'		Wetterström 76'

Stadion Marszałka Józefa Piłsudskiego, Warsaw
Attendance: 25,000
Referee: Leclerq (France)

Sweden: Gustav Sjöberg - Valter Lundgren, Olle Källgren - Erik Almgren, Sven Jacobsson, Kurt Svanström - Gustaf Josefsson, Sven Jonasson, Bertil Ericsson, Lennart Bunke, Gustav Wetterström.

June 27, 1937
Friendly
№ 207

Romania	2–2	Sweden
Baratky 22', 89' (p)		Jonasson 25', 30'

Stadionul Principele Carol (O.N.E.F.), Bucharest
Attendance: 25,000
Referee: Langenus (Belgium)

Sweden: Gustav Sjöberg - Valter Lundgren, Olle Källgren - Erik Almgren, Sven Jacobsson, Kurt Svanström - Gustaf Josefsson, Erik Persson, Sven Jonasson, Lennart Bunke, Gustav Wetterström.

== National team players in season 1936–37 ==
Name	Pos.	Caps	Goals	Club
Erik Almgren	MF	3	0	AIK
Ernst Andersson	MF	3	0	IFK Göteborg
Otto Andersson	DF	1	0	Örgryte IS
Sven "Vrålis" Andersson	MF	1	0	AIK
Nils Axelsson	DF	2	0	Hälsingborgs IF
Fritz Berg	MF	2	0	IFK Göteborg
Sven "Svenne Berka" Bergquist (Bergqvist)	GK	2	0	AIK (1); Hammarby IF (1)
Lennart "Ledde" Bunke	FW	4	3	Hälsingborgs IF
Victor Carlund	MF	1	0	Örgryte IS
Arvid "Emma" Emanuelsson	MF	2	0	IF Elfsborg
Bertil Ericsson	FW	3	1	Sandvikens IF
Karl-Erik Grahn	FW	3	0	IF Elfsborg
Åke Hallman	FW	1	0	IF Elfsborg
Sven "Jack" Jacobsson	MF	2	0	GAIS
Torsten Johansson	MF	1	0	IFK Norrköping
Sven "Jonas" Jonasson	FW	6	4	IF Elfsborg
Gustaf "Niggern" Josefsson	FW	6	2	AIK
Olle "Plåten" Källgren	DF	4	0	Sandvikens IF
Erik "Järnbacken" Källström	DF	1	0	IF Elfsborg
Gunnar Löfgren	MF	2	0	IFK Göteborg
Valter Lundgren	DF	4	0	AIK
Andreas Nilsson	FW	1	0	Malmö FF
Axel "Acke" Nilsson	FW	2	0	AIK
Erik "Lillis" Persson	FW	5	3	AIK
Gustav "Gurra" Sjöberg	GK	5	0	AIK
Walter Sköld	DF	2	0	AIK
Kurt Svanström	MF	4	1	Örgryte IS
Gustav "Gutta" Wetterström	FW	3	4	IK Sleipner
Olle Zetherlund (Zetterlund)	FW	1	0	AIK
