= 1957–58 Division 3 (Swedish football) =

Swedish League Division 3
- Season: 1957–58
- Champions: Luleå SK; IF Älgarna; Fagerviks GF; Avesta AIK; IK City; Karlstads BIK; Finspångs AIK; Fässbergs IF; Trollhttans IF; Högadals IS; Varbergs BoIS; Billesholms GIF
- Promoted: 12 teams above
- Relegated: 36 teams

Statistics of Swedish football Division 3 for the 1957–58 season.

== League standings ==
=== Norra Norrland 1957–58 ===
Pos	Team	Pld	W	D	L	GF	GA	GD	Pts	Promotion or relegation
1	Luleå SK	27	19	4	4	87	40	+47	42	Promoted
2	Sunnanå SK	27	14	5	8	67	51	+16	33	
3	IK Vargarna, Byske	27	13	6	8	55	39	+16	32	
4	Haparanda SK-Taktik	27	13	6	8	54	41	+13	32	
5	Piteå IF	27	12	4	11	60	59	+1	28	
6	Rönnskärs IF, Skelleftehamn	27	10	6	11	52	42	+10	26	
7	Medle SK	27	10	4	13	68	73	−5	24	Relegated
8	Kiruna AIF	27	7	7	13	55	72	−17	21	Relegated
9	IFK Arvidsjaur	27	7	5	15	54	87	−33	19	Relegated
10	Rosviks IK	27	6	1	20	33	81	−48	13	Relegated

=== Mellersta Norrland 1957–58 ===
Pos	Team	Pld	W	D	L	GF	GA	GD	Pts	Promotion or relegation
1	IF Älgarna, Härnösand	33	24	5	4	129	32	+97	53	Promoted
2	Sandviks IK, Holmsund	33	23	2	8	116	34	+82	48	
3	Sollefteå GIF	33	21	4	8	118	49	+69	46	
4	IF Friska Viljor, Örnsköldsvik	33	18	6	9	86	66	+20	42	
5	Husums IF	33	14	8	11	74	73	+1	36	
6	Köpmanholmens IF	33	13	6	14	66	64	+2	32	
7	Sandåkerns SK, Umeå	33	14	2	17	76	71	+5	30	
8	IFK Härnösand	33	11	7	15	66	80	−14	29	
9	Domsjö IF	33	13	3	17	70	87	−17	29	
10	IFK Umeå	33	12	3	18	74	101	−27	27	Relegated
11	Kramfors IF	33	8	2	23	57	103	−46	18	Relegated
12	Hammerdals IF	33	2	2	29	34	206	−172	6	Relegated

=== Södra Norrland 1957–58 ===
Pos	Team	Pld	W	D	L	GF	GA	GD	Pts	Promotion or relegation
1	Fagerviks GF, Timrå	33	22	5	6	101	49	+52	49	Promoted
2	Ljusdals IF	33	21	6	6	108	61	+47	48	
3	Wifsta/Östrands IF, Timrå	33	18	4	11	100	68	+32	40	
4	Ljunga IF, Ljungaverk	33	14	6	13	87	66	+21	34	
5	Ljusne AIK	33	14	6	13	91	87	+4	34	
6	Sandvikens AIK	33	14	6	13	73	69	+4	34	
7	Högbo AIK, Sandviken	33	13	6	14	72	70	+2	32	
8	Hofors AIF	33	14	4	15	64	78	−14	32	
9	Skutskärs IF	33	10	10	13	59	86	−27	30	
10	Kubikenborgs IF, Sundsvall	33	13	3	17	67	65	+2	29	Relegated
11	Iggesunds IK	33	9	7	17	67	91	−24	25	Relegated
12	Ytterhogdals IK	33	3	3	27	27	126	−99	9	Relegated

=== Norra Svealand 1957–58 ===
Pos	Team	Pld	W	D	L	GF	GA	GD	Pts	Promotion or relegation
1	Avesta AIK	27	18	2	7	63	37	+26	38	Promoted
2	IFK Grängesberg	27	16	4	7	55	36	+19	36	
3	Falu BS	27	15	4	8	63	53	+10	34	
4	Rimbo IF	27	13	3	11	63	46	+17	29	
5	Ludvika FFI	27	11	6	10	55	48	+7	28	
6	IF Vesta, Uppsala	27	11	6	10	52	46	+6	28	
7	Säters IF	27	11	4	12	60	57	+3	26	
8	IFK Västerås	27	11	2	14	54	52	+2	24	Relegated
9	IK Franke, Västerås	27	8	3	16	47	75	−28	19	Relegated
10	Västerås IK	27	3	2	22	29	91	−62	8	Relegated

=== Östra Svealand 1957–58 ===
Pos	Team	Pld	W	D	L	GF	GA	GD	Pts	Promotion or relegation
1	IK City, Eskilstuna	27	18	4	5	94	47	+47	40	Promoted
2	IK Sture, Stockholm	27	15	6	6	81	62	+19	36	
3	Hagalunds IS, Solna	27	15	3	9	74	51	+23	33	
4	Sundbybergs IK	27	12	9	6	59	50	+9	33	
5	Södertälje SK	27	14	0	13	74	63	+11	28	
6	Huvudsta IS, Solna	27	11	4	12	56	62	−6	26	
7	Karlbergs BK, Stockholm	27	9	5	13	73	78	−5	23	
8	Ängby IF, Bromma	27	9	3	15	74	84	−10	21	Relegated
9	IK Viljan, Strängnäs	27	10	1	16	51	90	−39	21	Relegated
10	Älvsjö AIK	27	3	3	21	48	97	−49	9	Relegated

=== Västra Svealand 1957–58 ===
Pos	Team	Pld	W	D	L	GF	GA	GD	Pts	Promotion or relegation
1	Karlstads BIK	30	19	9	2	91	44	+47	47	Promoted
2	Karlskoga IF	30	17	4	9	75	51	+24	38	
3	IFK Kumla	30	14	7	9	70	48	+22	35	
4	Arvika BK	30	13	9	8	63	53	+10	35	
5	Hällefors AIF	30	14	5	11	77	57	+20	33	
6	BK Forward, Örebro	30	12	7	11	54	50	+4	31	
7	Karlslunds IF, Örebro	30	10	7	13	65	71	−6	27	
8	Karlstads FF	30	9	9	12	62	76	−14	27	
9	Deje IK	30	8	4	18	55	70	−15	20	Relegated
10	IFK Hallsberg	30	6	8	16	45	82	−37	20	Relegated
11	Slottsbrons IF	30	7	3	20	48	103	−55	17	Relegated

=== Nordöstra Götaland 1957–58 ===
Pos	Team	Pld	W	D	L	GF	GA	GD	Pts	Promotion or relegation
1	Finspångs AIK	27	17	6	4	55	26	+29	40	Promoted
2	Gamleby IF	27	15	4	8	71	41	+30	34	
3	Västerviks AIS	27	15	4	8	67	63	+4	34	
4	BK Kenty, Linköping	27	12	4	11	74	50	+24	28	
5	IF Sylvia, Norrköping	27	11	5	11	72	71	+1	27	
6	Vadstena GIF	27	11	5	11	50	60	−10	27	
7	Skärblacka IF	27	10	6	11	56	50	+6	26	
8	Gottfridsbergs IF, Linköping	27	10	5	12	51	67	−16	25	Relegated
9	IFK Västervik	27	5	6	16	55	73	−18	16	Relegated
10	Kimstads GoIF	27	5	3	19	47	97	−50	13	Relegated

=== Nordvästra Götaland 1957–58 ===
Pos	Team	Pld	W	D	L	GF	GA	GD	Pts	Promotion or relegation
1	Fässbergs IF, Mölndal	27	21	4	2	81	26	+55	46	Promoted
2	Billingsfors IK	26	18	4	4	71	37	+34	40	
3	IF Viken, Åmål	27	12	5	10	55	58	−3	29	
4	Lundens AIS, Göteborg	27	11	5	11	62	49	+13	27	
5	IFK Åmål	27	10	7	10	54	43	+11	27	
6	BK Häcken, Göteborg	27	12	3	12	48	51	−3	27	
7	Redbergslids IK, Göteborg	27	9	7	11	49	56	−7	25	
8	Göteborgs FF	27	8	4	15	38	66	−28	20	Relegated
9	Lindholmens BK, Göteborg	27	6	6	15	53	84	−31	18	Relegated
10	Vidkärrs IF, Göteborg	27	4	3	20	25	66	−41	11	Relegated

=== Mellersta Götaland 1957–58 ===
Pos	Team	Pld	W	D	L	GF	GA	GD	Pts	Promotion or relegation
1	Trollhättans IF	27	15	4	8	62	41	+21	34	Promoted
2	Huskvarna Södra IS	27	14	4	9	72	60	+12	32	
3	IF Heimer, Lidköping	27	12	8	7	57	46	+11	32	
4	IFK Trollhättan	27	11	9	7	62	51	+11	31	
5	IFK Hjo	27	12	7	8	45	41	+4	31	
6	Hvetlanda GIF, Vetlanda	27	11	7	9	53	53	0	29	
7	Tibro AIK	27	12	5	10	34	33	+1	29	
8	IK Tord, Jönköping	27	10	7	10	54	52	+2	27	Relegated
9	IFK Tidaholm	27	4	9	14	45	65	−20	17	Relegated
10	Skara IF	27	2	4	21	26	68	−42	8	Relegated

=== Sydöstra Götaland 1957–58 ===
Pos	Team	Pld	W	D	L	GF	GA	GD	Pts	Promotion or relegation
1	Högadals IS, Karlshamn	27	23	2	2	93	20	+73	48	Promoted
2	Olofströms IF	27	20	1	6	65	36	+29	41	
3	Nybro IF	27	14	4	9	79	43	+36	32	
4	Hässleholms IF	27	13	5	9	46	52	−6	31	
5	Bromölla IF	27	10	7	10	47	48	−1	27	
6	Saltö BK, Karlskrona	27	10	5	12	52	53	−1	25	
7	IFK Hässleholm	27	6	9	12	36	50	−14	21	
8	IFK Osby	27	7	6	14	44	72	−28	20	Relegated
9	Kosta IF	27	5	3	19	36	72	−36	13	Relegated
10	Mjällby AIF	27	4	4	19	27	79	−52	12	Relegated

=== Sydvästra Götaland 1957–58 ===
Pos	Team	Pld	W	D	L	GF	GA	GD	Pts	Promotion or relegation
1	Varbergs BoIS	27	19	5	3	78	26	+52	43	Promoted
2	Östers IF, Växjö	27	17	4	6	63	38	+25	38	
3	Gnosjö IF	27	12	7	8	46	42	+4	31	
4	Gislaveds IS	27	11	5	11	52	55	−3	27	
5	IFK Värnamo	27	10	6	11	52	49	+3	26	
6	Falkenbergs FF	27	10	6	11	43	50	−7	26	
7	Gerdskens BK, Alingsås	27	10	4	13	61	59	+2	24	
8	Mariedals IK, Borås	27	8	7	12	37	45	−8	23	Relegated
9	Ulricehamns IF	27	4	8	15	30	61	−31	16	Relegated
10	Anderstorps IF	27	5	6	16	33	70	−37	16	Relegated

=== Södra Götaland 1957–58 ===
Pos	Team	Pld	W	D	L	GF	GA	GD	Pts	Promotion or relegation
1	Billesholms GIF	30	20	3	7	67	41	+26	43	Promoted
2	Malmö BI	30	18	6	6	69	36	+33	42	
3	Gunnarstorps IF	30	17	4	9	82	56	+26	38	
4	Arlövs BoIF	30	14	5	11	65	55	+10	33	
5	IFK Trelleborg	30	12	9	9	53	54	−1	33	
6	Trelleborgs FF	30	12	5	13	64	70	−6	29	
7	IFK Ystad	30	12	5	13	50	56	−6	29	
8	Högaborgs BK, Helsingborg	30	11	6	13	51	50	+1	28	
9	BK Fram, Landskrona	30	9	7	14	59	68	−9	25	Relegated
10	BK Landora, Landskrona	30	7	4	19	46	75	−29	18	Relegated
11	IFK Simrishamn	30	4	4	22	38	83	−45	12	Relegated
