= 1936–37 Division 3 (Swedish football) =

Swedish League Division 3
- Season: 1936–37
- Champions: Strands IF; Skutskärs IF; Sundbybergs IK; Katrineholms AIK; Arvika BK; Motala AIFMotala AIF; IFK Värnamo; Kinna IF; Varbergs BoIS; IFK Trelleborg
- Promoted: 8 teams
- Relegated: 17 teams

Statistics of Swedish football Division 3 for the 1936–37 season.

== League standings ==
=== Uppsvenska Östra 1936–37 ===
Pos	Team	Pld	W	D	L	GF	GA	GD	Pts	Qualification or relegation
1	Strands IF, Hudiksvall	16	12	1	3	45	23	+22	25	Promotion Playoffs
2	Kubikenborgs IF	16	10	1	5	50	40	+10	21	
3	Skärgårdens IF, Sandarne	16	9	2	5	50	26	+24	20	
4	Iggesunds IK	16	9	1	6	26	22	+4	19	
5	Söderhamns IF	16	7	3	6	38	26	+12	17	
6	Stugsunds IK	16	8	1	7	35	36	−1	17	
7	Edsbyns IF	16	6	1	9	30	38	−8	13	
8	Strömsbruks IF	16	3	3	10	26	47	−21	9	Relegated
9	Brobergs IF, Söderhamn	16	1	1	14	17	59	−42	3	Relegated

=== Uppsvenska Västra 1936–37 ===
Pos	Team	Pld	W	D	L	GF	GA	GD	Pts	Promotion or relegation
1	Skutskärs IF	18	11	5	2	49	18	+31	27	Promotion Playoffs – Promoted
2	Ludvika FFI	18	12	1	5	48	31	+17	25	
3	Örtakoloniens IF, Sandviken	18	9	2	7	41	31	+10	20	
4	Brynäs IF, Gävle	18	8	3	7	39	32	+7	19	
5	Avesta AIK	18	7	4	7	26	39	−13	18	
6	Avesta IF	18	7	3	8	30	30	0	17	
7	Sandvikens AIK	18	5	6	7	32	32	0	16	
8	Hofors AIF	18	6	3	9	25	30	−5	15	
9	Forsbacka IK	18	6	3	9	22	39	−17	15	Relegated
10	Falu BS, Falun	18	3	2	13	20	50	−30	8	Relegated

=== Östsvenska 1936–37 ===
Pos	Team	Pld	W	D	L	GF	GA	GD	Pts	Promotion or relegation
1	Sundbybergs IK	18	13	3	2	51	18	+33	29	Promoted
2	Enköpings SK	18	11	5	2	44	19	+25	27	
3	IF Vesta, Uppsala	18	10	5	3	47	36	+11	25	
4	IK Sture, Stockholm	18	9	2	7	37	30	+7	20	
5	Djursholms IS	18	9	1	8	44	41	+3	19	
6	Enskede IK	18	7	2	9	37	32	+5	16	
7	Nyköpings BK	18	5	6	7	35	35	0	16	
8	Karlbergs BK, Stockholm	18	4	3	11	24	43	−19	11	
9	Heby AIF	18	5	1	12	23	55	−32	11	Relegated
10	Morgongåva SK	18	2	2	14	14	47	−33	6	Relegated

=== Mellansvenska 1936–37 ===
Pos	Team	Pld	W	D	L	GF	GA	GD	Pts	Promotion
1	Katrineholms AIK	18	13	2	3	30	20	+10	28	Promoted
2	Örebro IK	18	11	3	4	45	24	+21	25	
3	Örebro SK	18	10	2	6	50	23	+27	22	
4	IK City, Eskilstuna	18	9	3	6	40	24	+16	21	
5	IFK Kumla	18	9	1	8	38	33	+5	19	
6	Laxå IF	18	7	1	10	28	31	−3	15	
7	Hälleforsnäs IF	18	5	5	8	22	32	−10	15	
8	Kolsva IF	18	5	4	9	20	24	−4	14	
9	Frövi IK	18	4	3	11	26	49	−23	11	
10	IF Verdandi, Eskilstuna	18	3	4	11	18	47	−29	10	

=== Nordvästra 1936–37 ===
Pos	Team	Pld	W	D	L	GF	GA	GD	Pts	Promotion or relegation
1	Arvika BK	18	13	1	4	64	24	+40	27	Promoted
2	Slottsbrons IF	18	12	0	6	51	23	+28	24	
3	IF Örnen, Kristinehamn	18	10	3	5	46	24	+22	23	
4	Deje IK	18	10	1	7	54	47	+7	21	
5	IFK Åmål	18	9	2	7	47	41	+6	20	
6	IFK Sunne	18	7	6	5	34	33	+1	20	
7	Hällefors AIF	18	7	2	9	33	46	−13	16	
8	Mariehofs IF, Karlstad	18	6	2	10	36	49	−13	14	
9	Skiveds SK	18	4	3	11	29	42	−13	11	
10	IF Viken, Åmål	18	1	2	15	15	80	−65	4	Relegated

=== Södra Mellansvenska 1936–37 ===
Pos	Team	Pld	W	D	L	GF	GA	GD	Pts	Promotion or relegation
1	Motala AIF	18	12	3	3	60	27	+33	27	Promoted
2	Boxholms IF	18	10	4	4	47	32	+15	24	
3	Waggeryds IK	18	10	2	6	34	24	+10	22	
4	Finspångs IK	18	8	3	7	36	31	+5	19	
5	Jönköping Södra IF	18	8	3	7	28	26	+2	19	
6	Finspångs AIF	18	7	4	7	41	45	−4	18	
7	Åtvidabergs FF	18	7	4	7	39	43	−4	18	
8	IFK Västervik	18	7	2	9	36	41	−5	16	
9	Västerviks AIS	18	3	3	12	31	53	−22	9	Relegated
10	IFK Oskarshamn	18	4	0	14	18	48	−30	8	Relegated

=== Sydöstra 1936–37 ===
Pos	Team	Pld	W	D	L	GF	GA	GD	Pts	Promotion or relegation
1	IFK Värnamo	18	13	1	4	52	12	+40	27	Promoted
2	Kalmar FF	18	12	2	4	50	23	+27	26	
3	IFK Ronneby	18	8	5	5	34	29	+5	21	
4	Kalmar AIK	18	9	2	7	44	33	+11	20	
5	Lessebo GIF	18	8	2	8	38	44	−6	18	
6	Nybro IF	18	8	1	9	38	47	−9	17	
7	Hovmantorps GIF	18	6	3	9	27	36	−9	15	
8	IFK Karlshamn	18	5	4	9	25	37	−12	14	
9	IFK Karlskrona	18	4	3	11	17	36	−19	11	Relegated
10	Karlshamns FF	18	3	5	10	21	49	−28	11	Relegated

=== Västsvenska Norra 1936–37 ===
Pos	Team	Pld	W	D	L	GF	GA	GD	Pts	Qualification or relegation
1	Kinna IF	18	13	4	1	54	16	+38	30	Promotion Playoffs
2	Trollhättans IF	18	9	5	4	33	19	+14	23	
3	Kungshamns IF	18	11	0	7	47	30	+17	22	
4	IF Heimer, Lidköping	18	10	2	6	46	32	+14	22	
5	IFK Uddevalla	18	9	2	7	35	27	+8	20	
6	Skara IF	18	8	3	7	32	27	+5	19	
7	Munkedals IF	18	7	1	10	32	41	−9	15	
8	Fritsla IF	18	4	4	10	26	46	−20	12	
9	IFK Hjo	18	4	2	12	16	41	−25	10	Relegated
10	Surte IS	18	3	1	14	13	55	−42	7	Relegated

=== Västsvenska Södra 1936–37 ===
Pos	Team	Pld	W	D	L	GF	GA	GD	Pts	Promotion or relegation
1	Varbergs BoIS	18	15	3	0	64	16	+48	33	Promotion Playoffs – Promoted
2	Skogens IF, Göteborg	18	11	2	5	57	23	+34	24	
3	Lundby IF, Göteborg	18	9	3	6	52	37	+15	21	
4	Oskarströms IS	18	8	4	6	50	28	+22	20	
5	Krokslätts FF, Mölndal	18	7	3	8	38	29	+9	17	
6	Falkenbergs FF	18	8	1	9	35	40	−5	17	
7	Göteborgs AIK	18	8	1	9	26	50	−24	17	
8	Partille IF	18	5	5	8	20	37	−17	15	
9	Landala IF, Göteborg	18	4	5	9	27	42	−15	13	Relegated
10	IS Hallandia	18	0	3	15	13	80	−67	3	Relegated

=== Sydsvenska 1936–37 ===
Pos	Team	Pld	W	D	L	GF	GA	GD	Pts	Promotion or relegation
1	IFK Trelleborg	18	13	2	3	69	33	+36	28	Promoted
2	Ystads IF	18	11	3	4	53	30	+23	25	
3	IFK Malmö	18	9	4	5	57	35	+22	22	
4	Bromölla IF	18	8	5	5	42	30	+12	21	
4	IFK Hässleholm	18	6	9	3	43	31	+12	21	
6	Klippans BoIF	18	7	6	5	47	33	+14	20	
7	Lunds GIF	18	6	5	7	45	50	−5	17	
8	Stattena IF, Hälsingborg	18	7	2	9	40	43	−3	16	
9	Ljungby IF	18	1	4	13	22	67	−45	6	Relegated
10	Lunds BK	18	1	2	15	22	88	−66	4	Relegated
