= 1957–58 in Swedish football =

The 1957–58 season in Swedish football, starting August 1957 and ending December 1958:

== Honours ==
=== Official titles ===
Title	Team	Reason
Swedish Champions 1957–58	IFK Göteborg	Winners of Allsvenskan

=== Competitions ===
Level	Competition	Team
1st level	Allsvenskan 1957–58	IFK Göteborg
2nd level	Division 2 Norrland 1957–58	Skellefteå AIK
2nd level	Division 2 Svealand 1957–58	Hammarby IF
2nd level	Division 2 Östra Götaland 1957–58	Landskrona BoIS
2nd level	Division 2 Västra Götaland 1957–58	Örgryte IS

== Promotions, relegations and qualifications ==
=== Promotions ===
Promoted from	Promoted to	Team	Reason
Division 2 Svealand 1957–58	Allsvenskan 1959	Hammarby IF	Winners of promotion play-off
Division 2 Västra Götaland 1957–58	Allsvenskan 1959	Örgryte IS	Winners of promotion play-off
Division 3 1957–58	Division 2 Norrland 1959	Fagerviks GF	Winners of Södra Norrland
Division 3 1957–58	Division 2 Norrland 1959	Luleå SK	Winners of Norra Norrland
Division 3 1957–58	Division 2 Norrland 1959	IF Älgarna	Winners of Mellersta Norrland
Division 3 1957–58	Division 2 Svealand 1959	Avesta AIK	Winners of Norra Svealand
Division 3 1957–58	Division 2 Svealand 1959	IK City	Winners of Östra Svealand
Division 3 1957–58	Division 2 Svealand 1959	Karlstads BIK	Winners of Västra Svealand
Division 3 1957–58	Division 2 Östra Götaland 1959	Billesholms GIF	Winners of Södra Götaland
Division 3 1957–58	Division 2 Östra Götaland 1959	Finspångs AIK	Winners of Nordöstra Götaland
Division 3 1957–58	Division 2 Östra Götaland 1959	Högadals IS	Winners of Sydöstra Götaland
Division 3 1957–58	Division 2 Västra Götaland 1959	Fässbergs IF	Winners of Nordvästra Götaland
Division 3 1957–58	Division 2 Västra Götaland 1959	Trollhättans IF	Winners of Mellersta Götaland
Division 3 1957–58	Division 2 Västra Götaland 1959	Varbergs BoIS	Winners of Sydvästra Götaland

=== League transfers ===
Transferred from	Transferred to	Team	Reason
Division 2 Östra Götaland 1957–58	Division 2 Svealand 1959	Katrineholms SK	Geographical composition
Division 2 Svealand 1957–58	Division 2 Västra Götaland 1959	SK Sifhälla	Geographical composition

=== Relegations ===
Relegated from	Relegated to	Team	Reason
Allsvenskan 1957–58	Division 2 Svealand 1959	IFK Eskilstuna	11th team
Allsvenskan 1957–58	Division 2 Östra Götaland 1959	Motala AIF	12th team
Division 2 Norrland 1957–58	Division 3 1959	Gefle IF	8th team
Division 2 Norrland 1957–58	Division 3 1959	Bodens BK	9th team
Division 2 Norrland 1957–58	Division 3 1959	Skellefteå IF	10th team
Division 2 Svealand 1957–58	Division 3 1959	Vasalunds IF	10th team
Division 2 Svealand 1957–58	Division 3 1959	IFK Bofors	11th team
Division 2 Svealand 1957–58	Division 3 1959	Surahammars IF	12th team
Division 2 Östra Götaland 1957–58	Division 3 1959	IF Saab	10th team
Division 2 Östra Götaland 1957–58	Division 3 1959	IF Allians	11th team
Division 2 Östra Götaland 1957–58	Division 3 1959	Kalmar AIK	12th team
Division 2 Västra Götaland 1957–58	Division 3 1959	Tranemo IF	10th team
Division 2 Västra Götaland 1957–58	Division 3 1959	Jonsereds IF	11th team
Division 2 Västra Götaland 1957–58	Division 3 1959	Tidaholms GIF	12th team

=== International qualifications ===
Qualified for	Enters	Team	Reason
European Cup 1958–59	Preliminary round	IFK Göteborg	Leader of Allsvenskan in spring 1958

== Domestic results ==
=== Allsvenskan 1957–58 ===

	Team	Pld	W	D	L	GF		GA	GD	Pts
1	IFK Göteborg	33	22	3	8	92	–	49	+43	47
2	IFK Norrköping	33	20	7	6	74	–	43	+31	47
3	Djurgårdens IF	33	16	10	7	69	–	48	+21	42
4	Malmö FF	33	16	8	9	62	–	49	+13	40
5	Helsingborgs IF	33	14	8	11	70	–	56	+14	36
6	GAIS	33	12	9	12	44	–	41	+3	33
7	IFK Malmö	33	11	6	16	39	–	59	-20	28
8	Halmstads BK	33	11	6	16	47	–	68	-21	28
9	AIK	33	8	10	15	47	–	55	-8	26
10	Sandvikens IF	33	9	8	16	50	–	61	-11	26
11	IFK Eskilstuna	33	8	8	17	45	–	77	-32	24
12	Motala AIF	33	6	7	20	35	–	68	-33	19

=== Allsvenskan promotion play-off 1957–58 ===
November 12, 1958

Skellefteå AIK	0–0	Hammarby IF

?, Skellefteå
November 18, 1958

Hammarby IF	6–2	Skellefteå AIK

?, Solna

November 11, 1958

Örgryte IS	5–0	Landskrona BoIS

?, Gothenburg
November 19, 1958

Landskrona BoIS	0–1	Örgryte IS

?, Landskrona

=== Division 2 Norrland 1957–58 ===

	Team	Pld	W	D	L	GF		GA	GD	Pts
1	Skellefteå AIK	27	18	2	7	66	–	34	+32	38
2	IFK Holmsund	27	13	11	3	58	–	27	+31	37
3	Marma IF	27	13	9	5	68	–	45	+23	35
4	GIF Sundsvall	27	13	4	10	62	–	49	+13	30
5	Lycksele IF	27	10	8	9	48	–	53	-5	28
6	IFK Luleå	27	10	5	12	54	–	66	-12	25
7	IFK Östersund	27	8	8	11	58	–	53	+5	24
8	Gefle IF	27	10	3	14	53	–	67	-14	23
9	Bodens BK	27	5	5	17	51	–	80	-29	15
10	Skellefteå IF	27	4	7	16	36	–	80	-44	15

=== Division 2 Svealand 1957–58 ===
	Team	Pld	W	D	L	GF		GA	GD	Pts
1	Hammarby IF	33	25	5	3	117	–	32	+85	55
2	Degerfors IF	33	21	6	6	87	–	42	+45	48
3	Örebro SK	33	22	3	8	91	–	41	+50	47
4	IK Brage	33	20	1	12	70	–	67	+3	41
5	Köpings IS	33	17	4	12	80	–	74	+6	38
6	Västerås SK	33	12	7	14	71	–	64	+7	31
7	IFK Stockholm	33	13	4	16	54	–	61	-7	30
8	SK Sifhälla	33	11	6	16	45	–	54	-9	28
9	Hallstahammars SK	33	10	7	16	56	–	77	-21	27
10	Vasalunds IF	33	9	5	19	54	–	82	-28	23
11	IFK Bofors	33	6	4	23	43	–	105	-62	16
12	Surahammars IF	33	3	6	24	27	–	96	-69	12

=== Division 2 Östra Götaland 1957–58 ===
	Team	Pld	W	D	L	GF		GA	GD	Pts
1	Landskrona BoIS	33	24	4	5	97	–	34	+63	52
2	Råå IF	33	19	9	5	71	–	38	+33	47
3	IFK Kristianstad	33	17	5	11	84	–	63	+21	39
4	BK Derby	33	15	5	13	74	–	57	+17	35
5	IK Sleipner	33	13	9	11	69	–	54	+15	35
6	Höganäs BK	33	14	6	13	58	–	63	-5	34
7	Kalmar FF	33	14	4	15	66	–	66	0	32
8	Katrineholms SK	33	13	6	14	45	–	51	-6	32
9	Åtvidabergs FF	33	12	6	15	56	–	73	-17	30
10	IF Saab	33	11	7	15	58	–	82	-24	29
11	IF Allians	33	4	8	21	35	–	79	-44	16
12	Kalmar AIK	33	6	3	24	44	–	97	-53	15

=== Division 2 Västra Götaland 1957–58 ===
	Team	Pld	W	D	L	GF		GA	GD	Pts
1	Örgryte IS	33	25	5	3	118	–	42	+76	55
2	IF Elfsborg	33	22	6	5	78	–	34	+44	50
3	Norrby IF	33	19	7	7	68	–	30	+38	45
4	Jönköpings Södra IF	33	14	7	12	61	–	58	+3	35
5	IK Oddevold	33	14	5	14	53	–	67	-14	33
6	Kinna IF	33	12	7	14	44	–	53	-9	31
7	Husqvarna IF	33	12	6	15	62	–	60	+2	30
8	Waggeryds IK	33	11	6	16	61	–	71	-10	28
9	IS Halmia	33	10	8	15	38	–	53	-15	28
10	Tranemo IF	33	9	7	17	39	–	60	-21	25
11	Jonsereds IF	33	10	4	19	48	–	78	-30	24
12	Tidaholms GIF	33	3	6	24	31	–	95	-64	12

== National team results ==
September 22, 1957
Nordic Championship
№ 353

Sweden	5–1	Finland

Råsunda, Solna
Attendance: 22233
Referee: Jörgensen (Denmark)
October 13, 1957
Nordic Championship
№ 354

Sweden	5–2	Norway

Råsunda, Solna
Attendance: 29840
Referee: Dusch (West Germany)
November 20, 1957
Friendly
№ 355

West Germany	1–0	Sweden

Volksparkstadion, Hamburg
Attendance: 76000
Referee: Zsolt (Hungary)
May 7, 1958
Friendly
№ 356

Sweden	3–2	Switzerland

Olympia, Helsingborg
Attendance: 20257
Referee: Van Nuffel (Belgium)
June 8, 1958
1958 World Cup Groupstage
№ 357

Sweden	3–0	Mexico
Simonsson 17', 64'; Liedholm 57' (pen)

Solna, Råsunda Stadium
Attendance: 45000
Referee: Latychev (Soviet Union)
June 12, 1958
19:00
1958 World Cup Groupstage
№ 358

Sweden	2–1	Hungary
Hamrin 34', 55'	(Report)	Tichy 77'

Solna, Råsunda Stadium
Attendance: 40000
Referee: Mowat (Scotland)
June 15, 1958
14:00
1958 World Cup Groupstage
№ 359

Sweden	0–0	Wales
	(Report)

Solna, Råsunda Stadium
Attendance: 35000
Referee: Van Nuffel (Belgium)
June 19, 1958
19:00
1958 World Cup Quarterfinals
№ 360

Sweden	2–0	Soviet Union
Hamrin 49'; Simonsson 88'	(Report)

Solna, Råsunda Stadium
Attendance: 45000
Referee: Leafe (England)
June 24, 1958
19:00
1958 World Cup Semifinals
№ 361

West Germany	1–3	Sweden
Schäfer 24'	(Report)	Skoglund 32'; Gren 81'; Hamrin 88'

Gothenburg, Ullevi
Attendance: 50000
Referee: Zsolt (Hungary)
June 29, 1958
15:00
1958 World Cup Final
№ 362

Sweden	2–5	Brazil
Liedholm 4'; Simonsson 80'	(Report)	Vavá 9', 32'; Pelé 55', 90'; Zagallo 68'

Solna, Råsunda Stadium
Attendance: 51800
Referee: Maurice Guigue (France)
