= Axel Nilsson =

Swedish footballer and ice hockey player

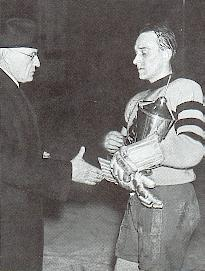
- Nilsson receiving the Le Mat Trophy in 1938
- Born: 12 November 1904; Stockholm, Sweden
- Died: 22 April 1978 (aged 73); Stockholm, Sweden
Association football career
- Position: Left winger
Youth career
- Hammarby IF
Senior career*
Years	Team	Apps	(Gls)
1925–1932	Hammarby IF	93	(46)
1932–1941	AIK	165	(53)
Total		258	(99)
International career
1930–1937	Sweden	8	(7)
- * Club domestic league appearances and goals
Ice hockey career
- Position: Defenceman
- Played for: Hammarby IF; AIK; IFK Stockholm
- National team: Sweden
- Playing career: 1927–1945
Bandy career
- Playing position: Forward
Youth career
- IK Mode
Senior career*
Years	Team	Apps^{†}	(Gls)^{†}
1925–1931	Hammarby		
- AIK
National team
1929–1933	Sweden	3	(0)
- * Senior club appearances and goals counted for the domestic league only. † Appearances (Goals).

Axel "Acke" Nilsson (12 November 1904 – 22 April 1978) was a Swedish football, ice hockey and bandy player, best known for representing Hammarby IF and AIK in all three sports.

A full international between 1930 and 1937, he won eight caps for the Sweden men's national football team. He also competed for the Sweden national ice hockey team at the 1936 Winter Olympics.

== Athletic career ==
=== Football ===
Born in Stockholm, Nilsson made his debut with Hammarby IF in 1925. Competing in Division 2, the second tier, Nilsson almost led the club to a promotion in his six seasons with the club. In total, Nilsson played 93 games and scored 46 goals for Hammarby IF, leading the team's offensive forces together with Sture Gillström, Sigfrid Öberg and Åke Hallberg. On 22 May 1931, Nilsson was selected into a mixed team of Stockholm-based players, together with six other teammates from Hammarby IF, to face Arsenal, in an exhibition game that the British club won 5–1.

Playing as a winger, Nilsson got known his strong left foot, pace, technique, finesse and dribbling skills. He also possessed a powerful shot with fine scoring efficiency. In 1932, he moved to rivals AIK in Allsvenskan, the domestic top division. He soon established himself as a frequent starter for his new club, forming a fruitful partnership with forward Per Kaufeldt. Initially, AIK struggled to compete for the Swedish Championship title, but finished 2nd in the table for two consecutive seasons before winning the league in 1936–37. He was one of the key offensive players at AIK during this period, together with Olle Zetherlund, Gustaf Josefsson and Erik Persson. On 18 April 1937, Nilsson scored the first ever goal at Råsunda, Sweden's new national stadium, in a 4–0 win against Malmö FF. He played a few more seasons with the club, but left AIK in 1941.

Throughout his career, Nilsson won eight caps for Sweden and scored seven goals, making his debut in 1930, while still playing with Hammarby IF in the second tier. Most notably, Nilsson scored a hat-trick in a 7–1 exhibition win against Romania on 1 September 1935, but did not compete in any international tournaments.

=== Ice hockey ===
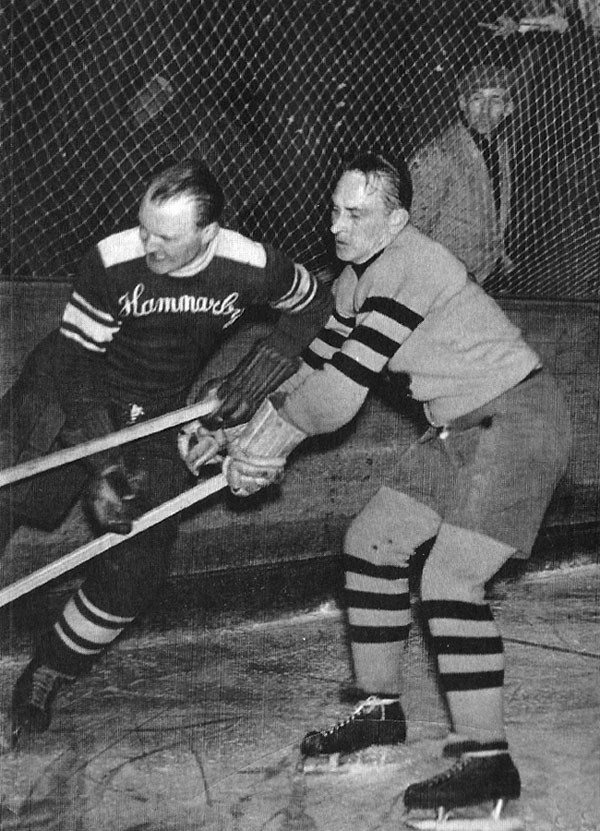
Nilsson (right) in a duel with opponent Lennart Hellman from Hammarby IF in 1938.

In 1927, Nilsson made his debut for Hammarby IF in Elitserien, the domestic top tier, getting known as a physical defenceman.

He moved to AIK in 1931. Nilsson won three Swedish championships – in 1934, 1935 and 1938 – with the club.

Nilsson played 11 international games for Sweden, and represented his country at three major tournaments: the 1936 Winter Olympics, 1937 World Championships and 1938 World Championships.

He ended his ice hockey career with IFK Stockholm, playing five seasons in the lower divisions, before retiring in 1945.

=== Bandy ===
Like many other Swedish footballers and ice hockey players at the time, Nilsson also played bandy. In 1931, he scored the first ever home goal for Hammarby IF in Allsvenskan, a new national league that had been established the same year. Between 1929 and 1933, he made three international appearances for Sweden and later represented AIK at club level.
