= 1952–53 in Swedish football =

The 1952–53 season in Swedish football, starting August 1952 and ending July 1953:

== Honours ==
=== Official titles ===
Title	Team	Reason
Swedish Champions 1952–53	Malmö FF	Winners of Allsvenskan

=== Competitions ===
Level	Competition	Team
1st level	Allsvenskan 1952–53	Malmö FF
2nd level	Division 2 Nordöstra 1952–53	Sandvikens IF
2nd level	Division 2 Sydvästra 1952–53	Kalmar FF
Regional Championship	Norrländska Mästerskapet 1953	Fagerviks GF

== Promotions, relegations and qualifications ==
=== Promotions ===
Promoted from	Promoted to	Team	Reason
Division 2 Nordöstra 1952–53	Allsvenskan 1953–54	Sandvikens IF	Winners
Division 2 Sydvästra 1952–53	Allsvenskan 1953–54	Kalmar FF	Winners
Division 3 1952–53	Division 2 Norrland 1953–54	Lycksele IF	Winners of Norrländska Norra
Division 3 1952–53	Division 2 Norrland 1953–54	Skellefteå AIK	2nd team in Norrländska Norra
Division 3 1952–53	Division 2 Norrland 1953–54	Fagerviks GF	Winners of Norrländska Södra
Division 3 1952–53	Division 2 Norrland 1953–54	Ljunga IF	2nd team in Norrländska Södra
Division 3 1952–53	Division 2 Norrland 1953–54	Sollefteå GIF	3rd team in Norrländska Södra
Division 3 1952–53	Division 2 Norrland 1953–54	Sandvikens AIK	2nd team in Norra
Division 3 1952–53	Division 2 Norrland 1953–54	IFK Östersund	4th team in Norra
Division 3 1952–53	Division 2 Norrland 1953–54	IF Älgarna	5th team in Norra
Division 3 1952–53	Division 2 Norrland 1953–54	Ljusne AIK	6th team in Norra
Division 3 1952–53	Division 2 Norrland 1953–54	GIF Sundsvall	7th team in Norra
Division 3 1952–53	Division 2 Svealand 1953–54	Avesta AIK	Winners of Norra
Division 3 1952–53	Division 2 Svealand 1953–54	Falu BS	3rd team in Norra
Division 3 1952–53	Division 2 Svealand 1953–54	Västerås IK	2nd team in Östra
Division 3 1952–53	Division 2 Svealand 1953–54	IFK Eskilstuna	3rd team in Östra
Division 3 1952–53	Division 2 Svealand 1953–54	Karlskoga IF	2nd team in Västra
Division 3 1952–53	Division 2 Götaland 1953–54	IK Sleipner	Winners of Östra
Division 3 1952–53	Division 2 Götaland 1953–54	Redbergslids IK	Winners of Västra
Division 3 1952–53	Division 2 Götaland 1953–54	Landskrona BoIS	Winners of Södra

=== League transfers ===
Transferred from	Transferred to	Team	Reason
Division 2 Nordöstra 1952–53	Division 2 Svealand 1953–54	IK City	2nd team
Division 2 Nordöstra 1952–53	Division 2 Svealand 1953–54	Hammarby IF	6th team
Division 2 Nordöstra 1952–53	Division 2 Svealand 1953–54	Västerås SK	7th team
Division 2 Nordöstra 1952–53	Division 2 Svealand 1953–54	IK Brage	8th team
Division 2 Nordöstra 1952–53	Division 2 Götaland 1953–54	Motala AIF	3rd team
Division 2 Nordöstra 1952–53	Division 2 Götaland 1953–54	Åtvidabergs FF	4th team
Division 2 Nordöstra 1952–53	Division 2 Götaland 1953–54	BK Derby	5th team
Division 2 Sydvästra 1952–53	Division 2 Götaland 1953–54	Höganäs BK	2nd team
Division 2 Sydvästra 1952–53	Division 2 Götaland 1953–54	Norrby IF	3rd team
Division 2 Sydvästra 1952–53	Division 2 Götaland 1953–54	Halmstads BK	4th team
Division 2 Sydvästra 1952–53	Division 2 Götaland 1953–54	Örgryte IS	5th team
Division 2 Sydvästra 1952–53	Division 2 Götaland 1953–54	Råå IF	6th team
Division 2 Sydvästra 1952–53	Division 2 Götaland 1953–54	BK Häcken	7th team
Division 2 Sydvästra 1952–53	Division 2 Götaland 1953–54	IFK Trelleborg	8th team

=== Relegations ===
Relegated from	Relegated to	Team	Reason
Allsvenskan 1952–53	Division 2 Svealand 1953–54	Örebro SK	11th team
Allsvenskan 1952–53	Division 2 Götaland 1953–54	IFK Malmö	12th team
Division 2 Nordöstra 1952–53	Division 3 1953–54	Karlstads BIK	9th team
Division 2 Nordöstra 1952–53	Division 3 1953–54	IF Viken	10th team
Division 2 Sydvästra 1952–53	Division 3 1953–54	Lunds BK	9th team
Division 2 Sydvästra 1952–53	Division 3 1953–54	IS Halmia	10th team

== Domestic results ==
=== Allsvenskan 1952–53 ===

	Team	Pld	W	D	L	GF		GA	GD	Pts
1	Malmö FF	22	14	3	5	60	–	32	+28	31
2	IFK Norrköping	22	12	3	7	49	–	32	+17	27
3	Djurgårdens IF	22	11	4	7	41	–	34	+7	26
4	Helsingborgs IF	22	8	8	6	33	–	23	+10	24
5	AIK	22	10	4	8	36	–	36	0	24
6	GAIS	22	11	1	10	50	–	50	0	23
7	Jönköpings Södra IF	22	7	7	8	40	–	43	-3	21
8	Degerfors IF	22	8	4	10	41	–	36	+5	20
9	IFK Göteborg	22	9	2	11	32	–	54	-22	20
10	IF Elfsborg	22	7	4	11	28	–	36	-8	18
11	Örebro SK	22	6	4	12	23	–	40	-17	16
12	IFK Malmö	22	5	4	13	29	–	46	-17	14

=== Division 2 Nordöstra 1952–53 ===

	Team	Pld	W	D	L	GF		GA	GD	Pts
1	Sandvikens IF	18	13	2	3	51	–	13	+38	28
2	IK City	18	12	4	2	48	–	16	+32	28
3	Motala AIF	18	11	3	4	38	–	28	+10	25
4	Åtvidabergs FF	18	11	1	6	40	–	23	+17	23
5	BK Derby	18	7	4	7	25	–	28	-3	18
6	Hammarby IF	18	7	3	8	25	–	23	+2	17
7	Västerås SK	18	5	3	10	23	–	41	-18	13
8	IK Brage	18	5	3	10	25	–	47	-22	13
9	Karlstads BIK	18	2	4	12	19	–	42	-23	8
10	IF Viken	18	3	1	14	20	–	53	-33	7

=== Division 2 Sydvästra 1952–53 ===
	Team	Pld	W	D	L	GF		GA	GD	Pts
1	Kalmar FF	18	11	2	5	31	–	24	+7	24
2	Höganäs BK	18	8	5	5	33	–	22	+11	21
3	Norrby IF	18	6	8	4	31	–	20	+11	20
4	Halmstads BK	18	8	4	6	35	–	27	+8	20
5	Örgryte IS	18	8	4	6	37	–	33	+4	20
6	Råå IF	18	8	4	6	26	–	26	0	20
7	BK Häcken	18	8	4	6	35	–	36	-1	20
8	IFK Trelleborg	18	6	3	9	24	–	32	-8	15
9	Lunds BK	18	6	2	10	25	–	31	-6	14
10	IS Halmia	18	1	4	13	20	–	46	-26	6

=== Norrländska Mästerskapet 1953 ===
Final

June 14, 1953

Fagerviks GF	3–1	Lycksele IF

Idrottsparken, Sundsvall

== National team results ==
September 21, 1952
Nordic Championship
№ 310

Finland	1–8	Sweden

Olympiastadion, Helsinki
Attendance: 20132
Referee: Pedersen (Norway)
October 5, 1952
Nordic Championship
№ 311

Norway	1–2	Sweden

Ullevål, Oslo
Attendance: 36458
Referee: Helge (Denmark)
October 26, 1952
Friendly
№ 312

Sweden	1–1	Italy

Råsunda, Solna
Attendance: 37679
Referee: Evans (England)
May 6, 1953
Friendly
№ 313

Scotland	1–2	Sweden

Hampden Park, Glasgow
Attendance: 83000
Referee: Ling (England)
May 28, 1953
World Cup 1954 Qualification
№ 314

Sweden	2–3	Belgium

Råsunda, Solna
Attendance: 31491
Referee: Mowat (Scotland)
June 11, 1953
Friendly
№ 315

Sweden	1–0	France

Råsunda, Solna
Attendance: 35571
Referee: Pedersen (Norway)
June 21, 1953
Nordic Championship
№ 316

Denmark	1–3	Sweden

Idraetsparken, Copenhagen
Attendance: 39500
Referee: Ahlo (Finland)
July 5, 1953
Friendly
№ 317

Sweden	2–4	Hungary

Råsunda, Solna
Attendance: 35876
Referee: Van Der Meer (Netherlands)
