= Avesta Motorstadion =

Stadium in the Avesta locality, Sweden

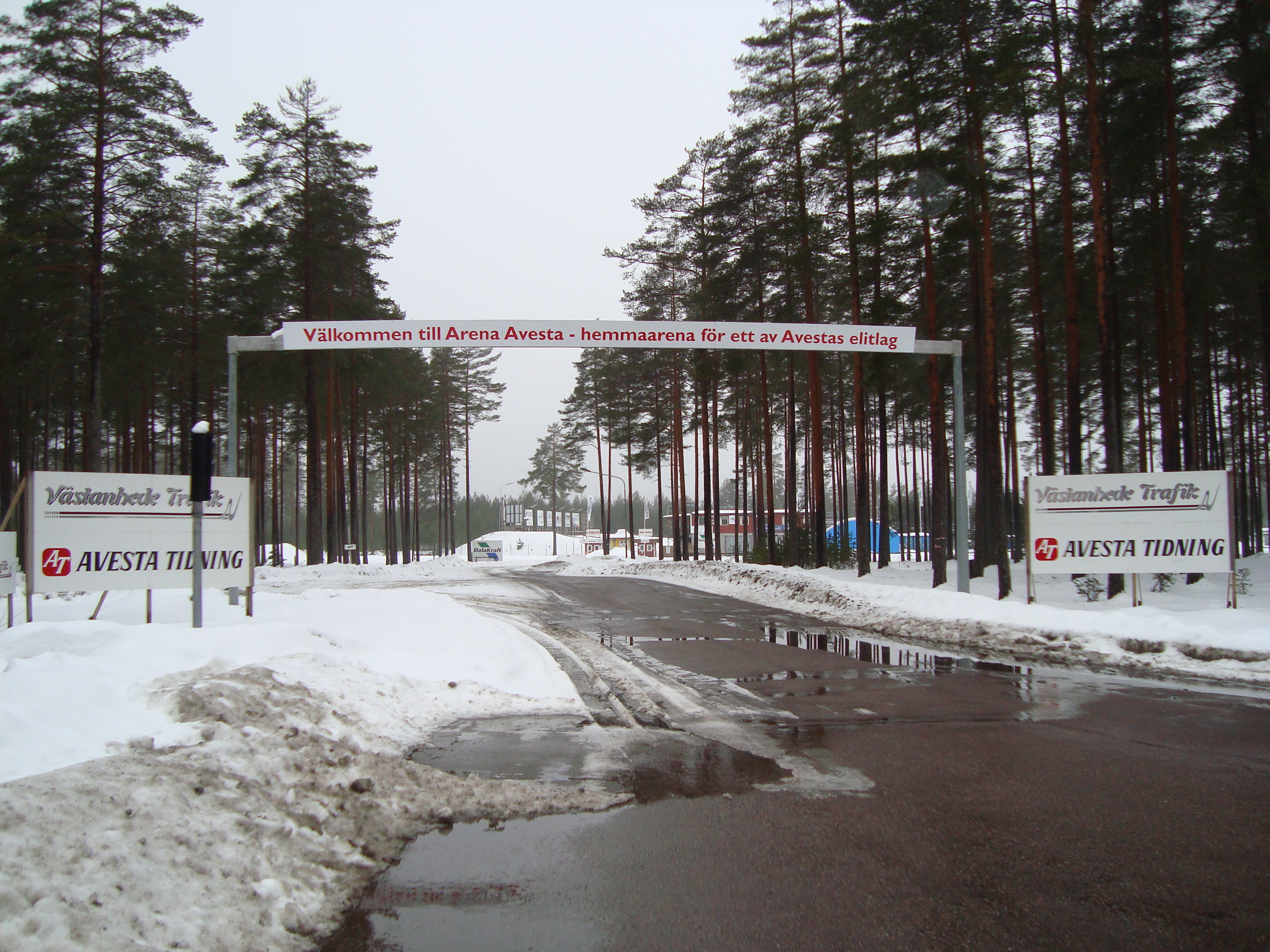
- Location: Brovallen Motorbana 510, 775 96 Krylbo, Avesta, Sweden
- Coordinates: 60°04′28″N 16°19′10″E
- Capacity: 12,000
- Operator: Masarna motorcycle speedway
- Opened: 1979
- Length: 0.315 km (0.196 mi)

Avesta Motorstadion also called the Arena Avesta or Stadion Brovalla is a 12,000 capacity motorcycle speedway track located 10 kilometres south of Krylbo and Avesta. The stadium is on the Swedish national road 70, in a remote area surrounded by Långheden Forest. The stadium hosts the Masarna speedway team that compete in the Swedish Speedway Team Championship and have been champions of Sweden on two occasions.

== History ==
The track was inaugurated in 1979, with the Masarna speedway team moving there from the Avestavallen.

The stadium's most significant event was the hosting of the World Championship round called the Speedway Grand Prix of Sweden in 2003. It has also hosted the finals of the Swedish Individual Speedway Championship in 2001, 2008 and 2017.
