= Norrländska Mästerskapet =

- Founded: 1925
- Abolished: 1953
- Last champions: Fagerviks GF
- Most championships: Bodens BK

Norrländska Mästerskapet was a Swedish football cup held to decide the Champions of Norrland. As teams from a large part of northern Sweden, approximately above the province of Medelpad, were not allowed to play in the Swedish league system until the 1952–53 season, the best team from the region was instead decided by this tournament, which was played between 1925 and 1953.

In 1925–1929, the competition was for district champions of the northern Swedish football district associations. The first edition was played in June 1925 with Strands IF beating Bodens BK, 2–1 in Hudiksvall. Starting in 1936, it became a play-off tournament for winners of regional series in the area.

== Previous winners ==
Season	Winners	Runners-up
1925	Strands IF (1)	Bodens BK
1926	Bodens BK (1)	IFK Östersund
1927	Söderhamns Skärgårds IF (1)	IFK Östersund
1928	Bodens BK (2)	GIF Sundsvall
1929	Bodens BK (3)	Norrbyskärs GIK
1930–31	No competition	
1932	Malmbergets AIF (1)	Ljusne AIK
1933–35	No competition	
1936	Bodens BK (4)	Kubikenborgs IF
1937	Bodens BK (5)	Sandviks IK
1938	Bodens BK (6)	Kramfors IF
1939	Domsjö IF (1)	Bodens BK
1940	No competition	
1941	Bodens BK (7)	IF Älgarna
1942	GIF Sundsvall (1)	IFK Holmsund
1943	IF Friska Viljor (1)	IFK Holmsund
1944	Bodens BK (8)	Sävenäs/Rönnskärs IF
1945–46	No competition	
1947	Ljusne AIK (1)	Skellefteå AIK
1948	IFK Holmsund (1)	Fagerviks GF
1949	IFK Östersund (1)	Bodens BK
1950	Skellefteå AIK (1)	Ljusdals IF
1951	Skellefteå AIK (2)	GIF Sundsvall
1952	Lycksele IF (1)	IF Älgarna
1953	Fagerviks GF (1)	Lycksele IF

== Cup champions ==
Titles	Club
8	Bodens BK
2	Skellefteå AIK
1	Domsjö IF
1	Fagerviks GF
1	IF Friska Viljor
1	IFK Holmsund
1	Ljusne AIK
1	Lycksele IF
1	Malmbergets AIF
1	Strands IF
1	GIF Sundsvall
1	Söderhamns Skärgårds IF
1	IFK Östersund
