= Bodens BK (disambiguation) =

Bodens BK (full name: Bodens Bandyklubb) is a Swedish sports club located in Boden, Sweden. The club is since 2007 a so-called "alliansklubb", meaning that its sections are now independent entities (in fact, clubs) under the common club name.

- Bodens BK Fotboll - football section.
- Bodens BK Handboll - handball section.
- Bodens BK Orientering - orienteering section.
- Bodens BK Simning - swimming section.
