= Dimitrios Angelopoulos =

Greek footballer (born 1993)

Personal information
- Full name: Dimitrios Angelopoulos
- Date of birth: 14 December 1993 (age 32)
- Place of birth: Athens, Greece
- Height: 1.92 m (6 ft 3 1/2 in)
- Position: Goalkeeper

Team information
- Current team: Härnösands FF
- Number: 71

Youth career
- 2000–2012: Panerythraikos
- 2012–2013: Panthrakikos

Senior career*
Years	Team	Apps	(Gls)
2013–2015	Iraklis Psachna	1	(0)
2015–2016	→ Härnösands FF (loan)	35	(0)
- * Club domestic league appearances and goals as of 17:20, 27 July l 2016 (UTC)

Dimitrios Angelopoulos (Greek: Δημήτριος Αγγελόπουλος, born 14 December 1993) is a Greek professional footballer who plays as a goalkeeper for Swedish club Härnösands FF.
