= Zubar =

Zubar is a surname. Notable people with the surname include:

- Ronald Zubar (born 1985), French footballer
- Stéphane Zubar (born 1986), French footballer, brother of Ronald
- Svyatoslav Zubar (born 1993), Ukrainian footballer
