= 1935–36 Division 2 (Swedish football) =

Swedish League Division 2
- Season: 1935–36
- Champions: Hallstahammars SK; Djurgårdens IF; Billingsfors IK; Malmö FF
- Promoted: Djurgårdens IF; Malmö FF
- Relegated: IFK Kumla; Örebro SK; Sundbybergs IK; Västerviks AIS; IFK Värnamo; Landala IF; IFK Malmö; Lessebo GIF

Statistics of Swedish football Division 2 for the 1935–36 season.

== League standings ==
=== Division 2 Norra 1935–36 ===
Teams from a large part of northern Sweden, approximately above the province of Medelpad, were not allowed to play in the national league system until the 1953–54 season, and a championship was instead played to decide the best team in Norrland.

Pos	Team	Pld	W	D	L	GF	GA	GD	Pts	Qualification or relegation
1	Hallstahammars SK	18	14	2	2	52	19	+33	30	Playoffs for promotion to Allsvenskan
2	IK Brage	18	11	1	6	57	34	+23	23	
3	IFK Örebro	18	10	2	6	39	30	+9	22	League transfer within league level
4	Gefle IF	18	9	2	7	54	36	+18	20 (Note: Tie breaker is goal average.)	
5	Fagersta AIK	18	8	4	6	37	41	−4	20	
6	Surahammars IF	18	7	2	9	33	39	−6	16	
7	Bollnäs GIF	18	6	3	9	27	34	−7	15	
8	Ljusne AIK	18	6	3	9	22	31	−9	15	
9	IFK Kumla	18	6	3	9	35	59	−24	15	Relegated to Division 3
10	Örebro SK	18	2	0	16	21	54	−33	4	Relegated to Division 3

=== Division 2 Östra 1935–36 ===
Pos	Team	Pld	W	D	L	GF	GA	GD	Pts	Qualification or relegation
1	Djurgårdens IF	18	11	4	3	35	22	+13	26	Playoffs for promotion to Allsvenskan
2	Skärblacka IF	18	10	1	7	53	30	+23	21 (Note: Tie breaker is goal average.)	
3	Värtans IK	18	8	5	5	34	33	+1	21	
4	Hammarby IF	18	9	2	7	28	26	+2	20	
5	BK Derby	18	7	6	5	26	28	−2	20	
6	Årsta SK	18	8	2	8	39	35	+4	18	
7	Mjölby AI	18	7	4	7	28	29	−1	18	
8	IFK Västerås	18	6	4	8	43	38	+5	16	League transfer within league level
9	Sundbybergs IK	18	5	4	9	25	36	−11	14	Relegated to Division 3
10	Västerviks AIS	18	1	4	13	11	45	−34	6	Relegated to Division 3

=== Division 2 Västra 1935–36 ===
Pos	Team	Pld	W	D	L	GF	GA	GD	Pts	Qualification or relegation
1	Billingsfors IK	18	12	4	2	48	29	+19	28	Playoffs for promotion to Allsvenskan
2	Karlskoga IF	18	10	6	2	57	31	+26	26	
3	Jonsereds IF	18	8	6	4	34	31	+3	22	
4	Husqvarna IF	18	8	3	7	44	30	+14	19	League transfer within league level
5	Degerfors IF	18	6	6	6	36	34	+2	18 (Note: Tie breaker is goal average.)	
6	IFK Kristinehamn	18	7	4	7	27	41	−14	18	
7	Fässbergs IF	18	6	5	7	38	40	−2	17	
8	Alingsås IF	18	5	3	10	37	41	−4	13	
9	IFK Värnamo	18	6	1	11	39	48	−9	13	Relegated to Division 3
10	Landala IF	18	1	4	13	29	64	−35	6	Relegated to Division 3

=== Division 2 Södra 1935–36 ===
Pos	Team	Pld	W	D	L	GF	GA	GD	Pts	Qualification or relegation
1	Malmö FF	18	14	2	2	61	17	+44	30	Playoffs for promotion to Allsvenskan
2	Helsingborgs IF	18	11	3	4	62	27	+35	25	
3	IFK Helsingborg	18	8	6	4	42	34	+8	22	
4	Malmö BI	18	8	3	7	29	30	−1	19	
5	Höganäs BK	18	8	2	8	32	30	+2	18 (Note: Tie breaker is goal average.)	
6	Ängelholms IF	18	7	4	7	44	48	−4	18	
7	IFK Kristianstad	18	7	1	10	30	57	−27	15	
8	IS Halmia	18	4	6	8	17	28	−11	14	
9	IFK Malmö	18	5	2	11	34	52	−18	12	Relegated to Division 3
10	Lessebo GoIF	18	2	3	13	16	51	−35	7	Relegated to Division 3
