= Lennart Hellman =

Swedish ice hockey player

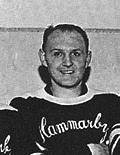
- Hellman in 1940 with Hammarby IF.
- Born: Åke Lennart Hellman; 2 December 1914; Stockholm, Sweden
- Died: 23 September 1960 (aged 45); Stockholm, Sweden
Ice hockey career
- Position: Left winger
- Played for: Hammarby IF
- National team: Sweden
- Playing career: 1932–1942
Bandy career
- Playing position: Forward
Senior career*
Years	Team	Apps^{†}	(Gls)^{†}
1935–1941	Hammarby IF		
- * Senior club appearances and goals counted for the domestic league only. † Appearances (Goals).
Association football career
- Position(s): Forward
Senior career*
Years	Team	Apps	(Gls)
1936	Hammarby IF	4	(0)
- *Club domestic league appearances and goals

Lennart "Joe" Hellman (2 December 1914 – 23 September 1960) was a Swedish ice hockey player who represented Hammarby IF. He competed in the hockey tournament at the 1936 Winter Olympics.

== Athletic career ==
=== Ice hockey ===
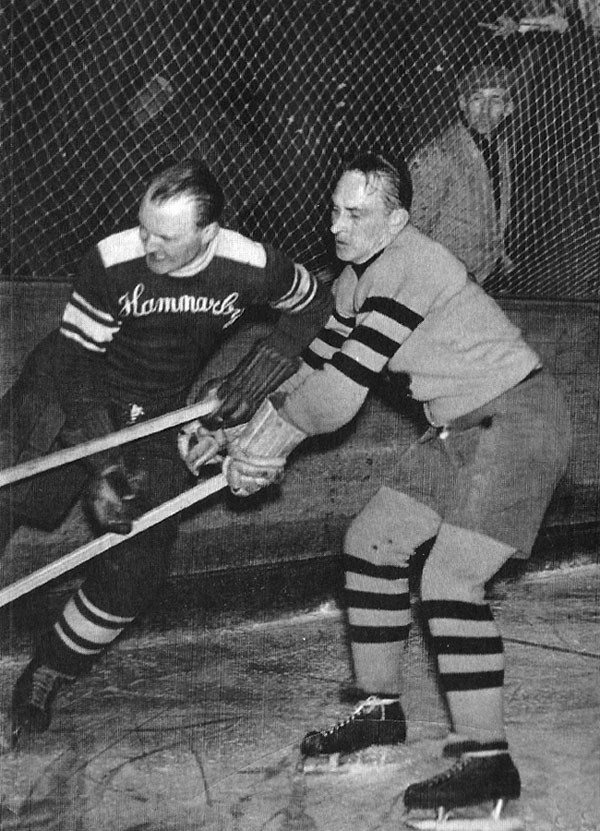
Hellman (left) in a duel with opponent Axel Nilsson from AIK in 1938.

Born and raised in Stockholm, Hellman started to play ice hockey with local club Hammarby IF as a youngster. He went to school together with Sven Bergqvist and Stig Emanuel Andersson, who both would become celebrated sportsmen in the club. He was promoted to the senior roster in 1932, competing in Sweden's highest division at Elitserien.

Playing as a left winger, Hellman became known as a good skater and an elegant stickhandler. He won two Swedish championships – in 1936 and 1937 – with Hammarby IF. In total, he played 151 games for Hammarby IF and scored 47 goals, before retiring in 1942.

Hellman played 19 international games with the Swedish national team. Most notably, he competed in the 1936 Winter Olympics in Garmisch-Partenkirchen. The Swedish team finished in a tie for 5th place, but the event doubled as the European Championship and leading to Hellman winning a European bronze medal. He also competed in the 1935 and 1938 World Championships, as Sweden finished 5th in both tournaments.

=== Other sports ===
He also played bandy with Hammarby IF, making one season with the club in the top tier Division 1 in 1935. In 1936, Hellman also made four league appearances for Hammarby IF's football section in Division 2, Sweden's second tier.

== Personal life ==
After he left the ice, Hellman continued in hockey administration, serving as a team leader for the Swedish national team. Two of his sons, Åke Hellman and Göran Hellman, would later represent Hammarby IF in ice hockey.
