= Svyatoslav Zubar =

Ukrainian association football striker

Personal information
- Full name: Svyatoslav Ihorovych Zubar
- Date of birth: 11 February 1993 (age 33)
- Place of birth: Lviv, Ukraine
- Height: 1.83 m (6 ft 0 in)
- Position: Striker

Senior career*
Years	Team	Apps	(Gls)
2014–2016	Bory Borynychi (amateurs)	41	(34)
2016	Härnösand	10	(5)
2017–2018	Rukh Vynnyky	33	(6)
- * Club domestic league appearances and goals as of 21 August 2018

Svyatoslav Ihorovych Zubar (Ukrainian: Святослав Ігорович Зубар; born 11 February 1993) is a Ukrainian footballer who plays as a striker.

== Career ==
Zubar is a product of the local youth sportive school in his native Lviv. His first trainer was Ruslan Brunets.

He began his career at the amateur level. Then he spent one season in the Swedish lower league club Härnösands FF. In February 2017, Zubar returned to Ukraine and signed a contract with FC Rukh Vynnyky. At that time Rukh was promoted, from the Ukrainian Second League to the Ukrainian First League.

Since 2019, Zubar has played football in the Lviv Oblast regional competitions.
