= Gustaf Josefsson =

Swedish footballer

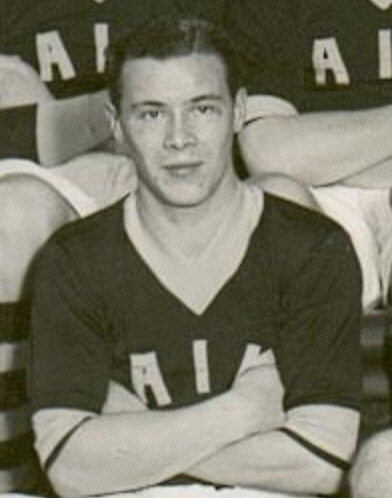

Personal information
- Full name: Karl Gustaf Ragnvald Josefsson Reinsell
- Date of birth: 16 February 1916
- Place of birth: Stockholm, Sweden
- Date of death: 16 April 1983 (aged 67)
- Place of death: Stockholm, Sweden

Senior career*
Years	Team	Apps	(Gls)
- AIK

International career
1936-37	Sweden	10	(3)
- * Club domestic league appearances and goals

Karl Gustaf Ragnvald "Niggern" Josefsson-Reinsell (16 February 1916 – 16 April 1983) was a Swedish footballer. He competed in the men's tournament at the 1936 Summer Olympics. He was a part of the AIK team that won the 1936–37 Allsvenskan.
