= Gunnar Löfgren =

Swedish footballer

Personal information
- Date of birth: 30 November 1910
- Date of death: 11 March 2012 (aged 101)
- Position: Midfielder

Youth career
- 1925–?: IFK Göteborg

Senior career*
Years	Team	Apps	(Gls)
1932–1939	IFK Göteborg	186	(19)

International career
1934–1937	Sweden	5	(0)
- * Club domestic league appearances and goals

Gunnar Löfgren (30 November 1910 – 11 March 2012) was a Swedish football midfielder. He joined the IFK Göteborg youth team in 1925 and the senior squad in 1933. He remained with IFK Göteborg through 1939, scoring 19 goals in 186 appearances and earning a Swedish national title with the team in 1935. He made his international debut for Sweden on 23 September 1934, during the 1933–36 Nordic Football Championship, in a 5-4 loss to Finland. He earned four other caps with the national team in 1937, participating in the 1937–47 Nordic Football Championship and the 1938 FIFA World Cup qualification. He was also selected to represent Sweden at the 1936 Summer Olympics in football, but chose not to attend in protest of Nazism. He died at the age of 101 in March 2012.
