= Avestavallen =

Stadium in Avesta, Sweden

- Interactive map of Avestavallen
- Location: 774 35 Avesta, Sweden
- Coordinates: 60°08′15″N 16°10′11″E

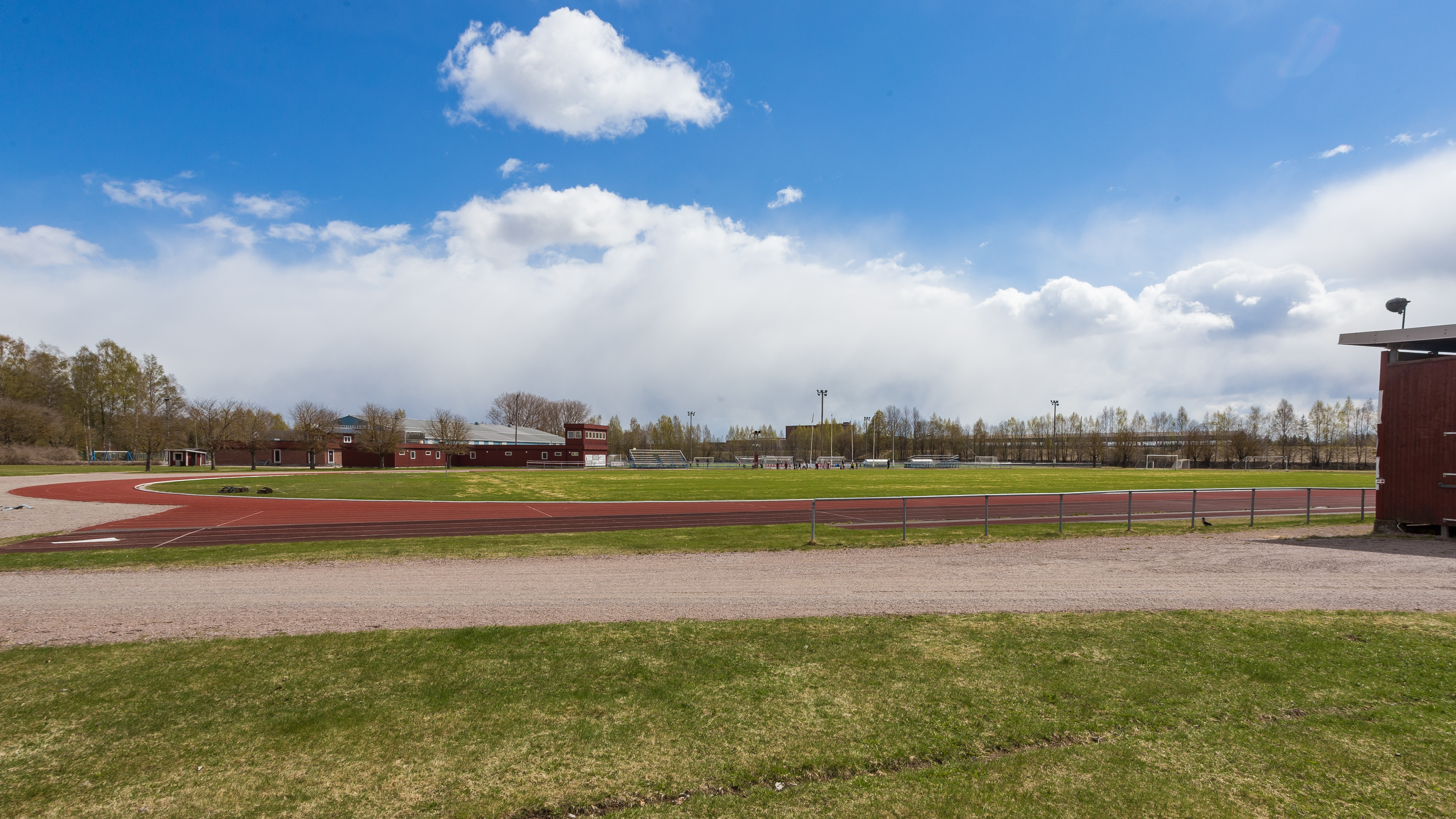
Avestavallen in 2017

Avestavallen is a multi-use sports complex in Avesta. It is located on the Vallgatan road, just south of the centre of the municipality.

The clubhouse and association football pitches are used by the football team Avesta AIK. Adjacent to the pitch is the main Avestavallen arean which hosts athletics. The complex is also used for speed skating and ice hockey.

A Motorcycle speedway track existed where the athletics track is now found. It hosted the speedway team Masarna from circa.1968 to 1979 and hosted a qualifying round of the Speedway World Championship in 1969.
