= Kubikenborgs IF =

Swedish football club

- Full name: Kubikenborgs Idrottsförening
- Founded: 1919
- Ground: Kubikenborgs IP; Kubikenborg; Sundsvall; Sweden
- Chairman: Mikael Friman
- Head coach: Stefan Lagergren
- Coach: Stefan Lagergren
- League: Division 2 Norrland
- 2024: Division 3 Mellersta Norrland, 1st
Home colours	Away colours

Kubikenborgs IF is a Swedish football club located in Kubikenborg, Sundsvall.

== Background ==
Kubikenborgs Idrottsförening were founded in 1919 and granted land to develop a stadium a year later. The sports specialised in a range of sports including soccer, hockey, figure skating, speed skating, table tennis, mini golf, ski jumping, cross country skiing and handball. They now only run a football programme.

Since their foundation Kubikenborgs IF has participated mainly in the middle divisions of the Swedish football league system. Their best period was in the early 1970s when they spent two seasons in Division 2 which was then the second tier of Swedish football. The club currently plays in Division 3 Mellersta Norrland which is the fifth tier of Swedish football. They play their home matches at the Kubikenborgs IP in Sundsvall. An attendance record of 3,324 was set in 1953.

Kubikenborgs IF are affiliated to the Medelpads Fotbollförbund. The club were runners-up in the Norrländska Mästerskapet in 1936 having lost 5–0 to Bodens BK in the final.

== Season to season ==
Season	Level	Division	Section	Position	Movements
1993	Tier 5	Division 4	Medelpad	7th	Våren (Spring)
	Tier 5	Division 4	Medelpad	2nd	Höstfyran (Autumn)
1994	Tier 5	Division 4	Medelpad	5th	
1995	Tier 5	Division 4	Medelpad	8th	
1996	Tier 5	Division 4	Medelpad	5th	
1997	Tier 5	Division 4	Medelpad	6th	
1998	Tier 5	Division 4	Medelpad	4th	
1999	Tier 5	Division 4	Medelpad	2nd	
2000	Tier 5	Division 4	Medelpad	10th	
2001	Tier 5	Division 4	Medelpad	7th	
2002	Tier 5	Division 4	Medelpad	6th	
2003	Tier 5	Division 4	Medelpad	1st	Promoted
2004	Tier 4	Division 3	Mellersta Norrland	2nd	Promotion Playoffs
2005	Tier 4	Division 3	Mellersta Norrland	2nd	Promoted
2006*	Tier 4	Division 2	Norrland	10th	Relegation Playoffs
2007	Tier 4	Division 2	Norra Svealand	12th	Relegated
2008	Tier 5	Division 3	Mellersta Norrland	5th	
2009	Tier 5	Division 3	Mellersta Norrland	4th	
2010	Tier 5	Division 3	Mellersta Norrland	2nd	Promotion Playoffs
2011	Tier 5	Division 3	Mellersta Norrland	7th	

* League restructuring in 2006 resulted in a new division being created at Tier 3 and subsequent divisions dropping a level.

== Attendances ==
In recent seasons Kubikenborgs IF have had the following average attendances:

Season	Average attendance	Division / Section	Level
2005	105	Div 3 Mellersta Norrland	Tier 4
2006	149	Div 2 Norrland	Tier 4
2007	75	Div 2 Norra Svealand	Tier 4
2008	93	Div 3 Mellersta Norrland	Tier 5
2009	88	Div 3 Mellersta Norrland	Tier 5
2010	75	Div 3 Mellersta Norrland	Tier 5
2011	137	Div 3 Mellersta Norrland	Tier 5

* Attendances are provided in the Publikliga sections of the Svenska Fotbollförbundet website.
