= 1936–37 Allsvenskan =

13th season of Allsvenskan

Allsvenskan
- Season: 1936–37
- Champions: AIK
- Relegated: Djurgårdens IF; IFK Norrköping
- Top goalscorer: Olle Zetherlund, AIK (23)
- Average attendance: 6,702

Statistics of Allsvenskan in season 1936/1937.

== Overview ==
The league was contested by 12 teams, with AIK winning the championship.

== League table ==
Pos	Team	Pld	W	D	L	GF	GA	GD	Pts	Qualification or relegation
1	AIK (C)	22	17	2	3	59	24	+35	36	
2	IK Sleipner	22	12	3	7	45	41	+4	27	
3	Örgryte IS	22	10	5	7	45	32	+13	25	
4	Sandvikens IF	22	12	1	9	46	34	+12	25	
5	IF Elfsborg	22	10	4	8	41	33	+8	24	
6	Malmö FF	22	9	3	10	39	45	−6	21	
7	IFK Göteborg	22	8	5	9	34	40	−6	21	
8	GAIS	22	9	3	10	27	36	−9	21	
9	Landskrona BoIS	22	9	1	12	33	42	−9	19	
10	Gårda	22	6	6	10	30	44	−14	18	
11	Djurgårdens IF (R)	22	6	2	14	39	52	−13	14	Relegation to Division 2
12	IFK Norrköping (R)	22	5	3	14	31	46	−15	13	Relegation to Division 2

Rules for classification: 1) points; 2) goal difference; 3) number of goals scored.
(C) Champions; (R) Relegated

== Results ==
Home \ Away	AIK	DIF	GAIS	GBK	IFE	IFKG	IFKN	IKS	BOIS	MFF	SIF	ÖIS
AIK		4–1	4–0	2–1	5–1	3–4	3–0	4–1	3–1	4–0	2–0	1–0
Djurgårdens IF	1–2		0–2	1–2	5–3	3–3	2–0	1–3	6–2	3–2	1–4	2–2
GAIS	1–3	2–1		2–0	0–0	2–1	1–3	0–2	2–1	3–1	0–3	0–4
Gårda BK	3–1	1–5	3–1		0–1	1–1	3–2	1–1	0–6	4–1	2–2	0–4
IF Elfsborg	1–1	2–0	1–1	3–2		0–1	3–1	3–4	5–0	3–1	1–0	5–0
IFK Göteborg	0–1	2–1	0–3	0–0	2–1		1–1	1–1	2–3	2–1	1–3	1–4
IFK Norrköping	0–1	3–1	3–0	1–1	1–2	3–2		2–4	1–2	2–5	0–3	0–1
IK Sleipner	1–3	2–1	3–2	4–2	1–3	2–0	2–1		2–0	0–1	2–4	1–4
Landskrona BoIS	1–5	3–0	0–2	0–1	2–0	1–2	2–1	1–3		3–0	1–0	0–0
Malmö FF	3–0	2–3	0–0	0–0	2–1	5–4	5–3	1–1	3–1		3–1	2–1
Sandvikens IF	2–5	3–1	2–1	3–1	3–1	1–2	1–2	2–4	0–2	2–0		3–2
Örgryte IS	2–2	3–0	1–2	3–2	1–1	0–2	1–1	4–1	4–1	4–1	0–4	

Legend: Blue = home team win; Yellow = draw; Red = away team win.

== Attendances ==
#	Club	Average	Highest
1	AIK	14,948	24,761
2	Malmö FF	8,611	13,813
3	Djurgårdens IF	8,334	12,486
4	IFK Göteborg	8,180	17,634
5	IK Sleipner	7,249	10,865
6	Örgryte IS	6,549	9,700
7	Gårda BK	5,654	9,770
8	IF Elfsborg	5,236	10,195
9	GAIS	4,991	7,226
10	IFK Norrköping	4,524	10,327
11	Sandvikens IF	4,022	9,234
12	Landskrona BoIS	2,617	3,845
