= Andreas Nilsson (footballer) =

Swedish footballer

Personal information
- Full name: Andreas Nilsson
- Date of birth: 26 January 1910
- Place of birth: Malmö, Sweden
- Date of death: 1 October 2011 (aged 101)
- Place of death: Malmö, Sweden
- Position: Midfielder

Youth career
- –1929: Vici

Senior career*
Years	Team	Apps	(Gls)
1929–1940	Malmö FF	214	(63)

International career
1936	Sweden	1	(0)
- * Club domestic league appearances and goals

Andreas Nilsson (26 January 1910 – 1 October 2011) was a Swedish footballer who played his entire professional career at Malmö FF.

== Playing career ==
Nilsson started playing football in the local youth club named Vici in Malmö. At nineteen years old in 1929 he transferred to Malmö FF who played in Division 2, the second tier of Swedish football at the time. He was a part of the team that won the league in 1931 and thus were promoted to Allsvenskan for the first time in the club's history. Nilsson were also part of the team that were disqualified in 1934 and once again promoted to Allsvenskan in 1936. Nilsson also played his first and only match for the Sweden national team in 1936 when Sweden played Finland in Helsinki. Nilsson retired from his playing career in 1940.

== Later life ==
Nilsson directly joined the inner circles at Malmö FF by becoming secretary of the board in 1940, a position he held until 1960. He was widely noticed during his later years since he was the only living former player that was born before the founding of Malmö FF. Nilsson was present at the inauguration of the club's new stadium Swedbank Stadion on 13 April 2009 when he presented the match ball to Alexander Nilsson, the youngest Malmö FF player in the starting eleven. Nilsson was also present for the last match of the 2010 season against Mjällby AIF when Malmö FF won the match 2–0 and thus also the championship that season, this was the last ever match that Nilsson attended. Andreas Nilsson died of natural causes on 1 October 2011 at the age of 101.
