= Valter Lundgren =

Swedish footballer (1917–1997)

Personal information
- Date of birth: 10 September 1917
- Place of birth: Nynäshamn, Sweden
- Date of death: 21 November 1997 (aged 80)

International career
Years	Team	Apps	(Gls)
1937–1938	Sweden	7	(0)

Valter Lundgren (10 September 1917 – 21 November 1997) was a Swedish footballer. He played in seven matches for the Sweden men's national football team in 1937 and 1938. He was also named in Sweden's squad for the Group 1 qualification tournament for the 1938 FIFA World Cup.

Lundgren played his football for AIK and Nynäshamns IF.
