= Härnösands FF =

Swedish football club

- Full name: Härnösand Fotbollförening
- Founded: 2007; 18 years ago
- Dissolved: 2019; 6 years ago
- Ground: Högslättens IP or Brovalla IP; Härnösand; Sweden
- Capacity: Högslättens IP – 5,000
- Coach: Niklas Hälldahl
- League: Division 3 Mellersta Norrland
- 2019 (final season): Division 3 Mellersta Norrland, 4th
Home colours	Away colours

Härnösands FF was a Swedish football team from Härnösand in Härnösand Municipality. After the 2019 season, the team merged with Älgarna-Härnösand IF, resulting in the latter's assumption of the team's place in the 5th tier Division 3 Mellersta Norrland for the 2020 season.

== Background ==
In 2007 Härnösands FF was established following a collaboration between IFK Härnösand and Älandsbro. In 2008 the club won Division 4 Ångermanland followed by Division 3 Norra Norrland in 2009. The club's matches were played at Högslättens IP or Brovalla IP.

A merger took place at the end of the 1995 season between IFK Härnösand and Bondsjöhöjdens IK Härnösand and the following season the club was known as BIK/IFK Härnösand. Another merger occurred during the period 2001–03 when the club was known as IFK Härnösand/Moffe BK.

The club was affiliated with the Ångermanlands Fotbollförbund.

While the latest incarnation of the club only played football, IFK Härnösand had long ago also had an active bandy department. IFK Härnösand became district champions of bandy in Västernorrland in 1913.

== Season to season ==
Season	Level	Division	Section	Position	Movements
1993	Tier 5	Division 4	Ångermanland	4th	
1994	Tier 5	Division 4	Ångermanland	5th	
1995	Tier 5	Division 4	Ångermanland	12th	Relegated
1996	Tier 5	Division 4	Ångermanland	7th	BIK/IFK Härnösand
1997	Tier 5	Division 4	Ångermanland	4th	
1998	Tier 5	Division 4	Ångermanland	3rd	
1999	Tier 5	Division 4	Ångermanland	6th	
2000	Tier 5	Division 4	Ångermanland	8th	
2001	Tier 5	Division 4	Ångermanland	7th	IFK Härnösand/Moffe BK
2002	Tier 5	Division 4	Ångermanland	7th	IFK Härnösand/Moffe BK
2003	Tier 5	Division 4	Ångermanland	3rd	IFK Härnösand/Moffe BK
2004	Tier 5	Division 4	Ångermanland	7th	
2005	Tier 5	Division 4	Ångermanland	4th	
2006*	Tier 6	Division 4	Ångermanland	5th	
2007	Tier 6	Division 4	Ångermanland	4th	
2008	Tier 6	Division 4	Ångermanland	1st	Promoted
2009	Tier 5	Division 3	Norra Norrland	1st	Promoted
2010	Tier 4	Division 2	Norrland	9th	
2011	Tier 4	Division 2	Norrland	8th	
2012	Tier 4	Division 2	Norrland	3rd	
2013	Tier 4	Division 2	Norrland	3rd	
2014	Tier 4	Division 2	Norrland	9th	
2015	Tier 4	Division 2	Norrland	5th	
2016	Tier 4	Division 2	Norrland	4th	
2017	Tier 4	Division 2	Norrland	6th	
2018	Tier 4	Division 2	Norrland	13th	Relegated
2019	Tier 5	Division 3	Mellersta Norrland	4th	Dissolved and merged with Älgarna-Härnösand IF

* League restructuring in 2006 resulted in a new division being created at Tier 3 and subsequent divisions dropping a level.

== Attendances ==
In recent seasons Härnösands FF have had the following average attendances:

Season	Average attendance	Division / Section	Level
2008	Not available	Div 4 Ångermanland	Tier 6
2009	195	Div 3 Norra Norrland	Tier 5
2010	372	Div 2 Norrland	Tier 4

* Attendances are provided in the Publikliga sections of the Svenska Fotbollförbundet website.

== Former players ==
- (Ukraine) Svyatoslav Zubar
