= Strands IF =

Swedish football club

- Full name: Strands Idrottsförening
- Ground: Glysis Sparbanken Arena; Hudiksvall; Sweden
- Chairman: Karl-Erik Hellstrand
- League: Division 4 Hälsingland
Home colours	Away colours

Strands IF is a Swedish football club located in Hudiksvall.

== Background ==
Strands IF currently plays in Division 3 Södra Norrland which is the fifth tier of Swedish football. They play their home matches at the Glysis Sparbanken Arena in Hudiksvall.

The club is affiliated to Hälsinglands Fotbollförbund. Strands IF won the Norrländska Mästerskapet in 1925.

== Season to season ==
Season	Level	Division	Section	Position	Movements
1993	Tier 5	Division 4	Hälsingland	1st	Promotion Playoffs – Promoted
1994	Tier 4	Division 3	Mellersta Norrland	6th	
1995	Tier 4	Division 3	Mellersta Norrland	6th	
1996	Tier 4	Division 3	Södra Norrland	6th	
1997	Tier 4	Division 3	Södra Norrland	11th	Relegated
1998	Tier 5	Division 4	Hälsingland	3rd	
1999	Tier 5	Division 4	Hälsingland	4th	
2000	Tier 5	Division 4	Hälsingland	2nd	Promotion Playoffs
2001	Tier 5	Division 4	Hälsingland	4th	
2002	Tier 5	Division 4	Hälsingland	1st	Promoted
2003	Tier 4	Division 3	Södra Norrland	5th	
2004	Tier 4	Division 3	Södra Norrland	8th	
2005	Tier 4	Division 3	Södra Norrland	11th	Relegated
2006*	Tier 6	Division 4	Hälsingland	2nd	Promotion Playoffs – Promoted
2007	Tier 5	Division 3	Södra Norrland	10th	Relegated
2008	Tier 6	Division 4	Hälsingland	1st	Promoted
2009	Tier 5	Division 3	Södra Norrland	7th	
2010	Tier 5	Division 3	Södra Norrland	10th	Relegated
2011	Tier 6	Division 4	Hälsingland	1st	Promotion Playoffs

* League restructuring in 2006 resulted in a new division being created at Tier 3 and subsequent divisions dropping a level.
