= Olle Zetherlund =

Swedish footballer

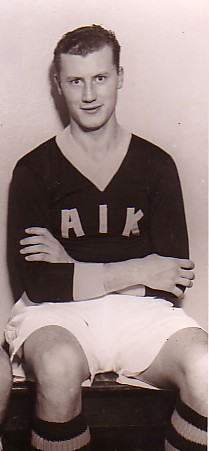

Personal information
- Full name: Olof Zetherlund
- Date of birth: 24 August 1911
- Date of death: 2 October 1974 (aged 63)

Senior career*
Years	Team	Apps	(Gls)
–1931	IFK Stockholm		
1931	Djurgårdens IF	11	(7)
1932–1933	IFK Stockholm		
1933–1939	AIK	54	(40)

International career
	Sweden B	1	(1)
1937	Sweden	1	(0)
- * Club domestic league appearances and goals

Olof "Olle" Zetherlund (24 August 1911 — 2 October 1974) was a Swedish footballer. He made one appearance for Sweden national team. Zetherlund became Allsvenskan top scorer in 1937 with AIK.
