= Avesta AIK =

Swedish football club

- logo
- Full name: Avesta Allmänna Idrottsklubb
- Nickname: ”Klubben"
- Short name: AAIK
- Founded: 1905
- Ground: Avestavallen; Avesta; Sweden
- Capacity: 5,000
- Chairman: Fredrik Andersson
- Coach: Aram Abed
- League: Division 4 Dalarna
- 2015: Division 2 Norra Svealand, 14th (Relegated)
Home colours	Away colours

Avesta AIK is a Swedish football club located in Avesta, Sweden.

== Background ==
The club was founded in February 1905 as Avesta Absolutisters Idrottsklubb. The name was changed to Avesta Allmänna Idrottsklubb in 1916. The club now only participates in football but over the years has undertaken many different sports such as bandy, table tennis, boxing, athletics, gymnastics, skiing and bowling. The club has grown from 24 members at its inception to over 800 members at the present day.

Since their foundation Avesta AIK has participated mainly in the upper and middle divisions of the Swedish football league system. The club currently plays in Division 3 Södra Norrland which is the fifth tier of Swedish football. They play their home matches at the Avestavallen in Avesta.

Avesta AIK are affiliated to Dalarnas Fotbollförbund.

== History ==
Avesta AIK has competed in the following divisions:

Season	League	Level	Place	Comment
2012	Division III, Södra Norrland	5	8	
2011	Division III, Södra Norrland	5	8	
2010	Division IV, Dalarna	6	1	Regional league of Dalarna. Promoted to Division III
2009	Division IV, Dalarna	6	5	Regional league of Dalarna
2008	Division IV, Dalarna	6	3	Regional league of Dalarna
2007	Division III, Södra Norrland	5	11	Relegated to Division IV
2006	Division II, Norra Svealand	4	12	Relegated to Division III
2005	Division III, Södra Norrland	4	3	Promoted to Division II
1997–2004	Regional leagues			
1996	Division III, Södra Norrland	4	12	Relegated to Division IV
1995	Division III, Södra Norrland	4	7	
1994	Division III, Södra Norrland	4	3	
1993	Division III, Södra Norrland	4	8	
1992	Hösttrean, Södra Norrland	4	3	
1992	Division II, Södra Norrland – vår	3	8	Relegated to Hösttrean
1991	Division III, Södra Norrland	4	1	Promoted to Division II
1974–1990	Regional leagues			
1973	Division III, Norra Svealand	3	10	Relegated to Division IV
1972	Division III, Norra Svealand	3	8	
1971	Division III, Norra Svealand	3	9	
1970	Division III, Norra Svealand	3	5	
1969	Division III, Norra Svealand	3	4	
1968	Division III, Norra Svealand	3	9	
1967	Division II, Svealand	2	12	Relegated to Division III
1966	Division II, Svealand	2	9	
1965	Division III, Norra Svealand	3	1	Promoted to Division II
1964	Division III, Norra Svealand	3	2	
1963	Division II, Svealand	2	10	Relegated to Division III
1962	Division II, Svealand	2	8	
1961	Division II, Svealand	2	6	
1960	Division II, Svealand	2	4	
1959	Division II, Svealand	2	9	
1957/58	Division III, Norra Svealand	3	1	Promoted to Division II
1956/57	Division II, Svealand	2	11	Relegated to Division III
1955/56	Division III, Norra Svealand	3	1	Promoted to Division II
1954/55	Division III, Norra Svealand	3	2	
1953/54	Division II, Svealand	2	10	Relegated to Division III
1952/53	Division III, Norra	3	1	Promoted to Division II
1951/52	Division III, Norra	3	4	
1949/50 – 1950/51	Regional leagues			
1948/49	Division III, Norra	3	8	Relegated to Division IV
1947/48	Division III, Norra	3	2	
1946/47	Division II, Norra	2	8	Relegated to Division III
1945/46	Division II, Norra	2	2	Best result so far, finishing only one point behind the league winner and a possibility to qualify for Allsvenskan
1944/45	Division II, Norra	2	7	
1943/44	Uppsvenska Sydvästra	3	1	Promoted to Division II
1942/43	Division II, Östra	2	10	Relegated to Division III
1941/42	Uppsvenska Sydvästra	3	1	Promoted to Division II
1940/41	Uppsvenska Sydvästra	3	1	
1939/40	Uppsvenska Västra	3	6	
1938/39	Uppsvenska Västra	3	5	
1937/38	Uppsvenska Västra	3	8	
1936/37	Uppsvenska Västra	3	5	
1935/36	Uppsvenska Västra	3	6	
1934/35	Uppsvenska Västra	3	3	

== Attendances ==
In recent seasons Avesta AIK have had the following average attendances:

Season	Average attendance	Division / Section	Level
2004	Not available	Div 4 Dalarna	Tier 5
2005	160	Div 3 Södra Norrland	Tier 4
2006	161	Div 2 Norra Svealand	Tier 4
2007	99	Div 3 Södra Norrland	Tier 5
2008	Not available	Div 4 Dalarna	Tier 6
2009	88	Div 4 Dalarna	Tier 6
2010	130	Div 4 Dalarna	Tier 6
2011	119	Div 3 Södra Norrland	Tier 5
2012	126	Div 3 Södra Norrland	Tier 5

* Attendances are provided in the Publikliga sections of the Svenska Fotbollförbundet website and European Football Statistics website.

The attendance record was set in 1961 when 4,498 people attended the match with IK Brage.
