= Älgarna-Härnösand IF =

Association football club in Härnösand, Sweden

- Full name: Älgarna-Härnösand Idrottsförening
- Founded: 19 February 1919
- Ground: Ängevallen, Härnösand
- Capacity: 2,500
- Coordinates: 62°38′10″N 17°56′28″E
- Coach: (Sweden) Lars Göran Wiklund
- League: Division 2 Norrland
- 2022: Division 2 Norrland, 9th
- Website: http://www.ifalgarna.se
Home colours	Away colours

Älgarna-Härnösand IF is a Swedish football team from Härnösand currently playing in Division 2 Norrland. The club is affiliated to the Ångermanlands Fotbollförbund. The club was originally called IF Älgarna before changing name during the annual meeting on 29 March 2020.

== History ==
In the early years, the club also had a bandy section. the club dominated bandy in Västernorrland in the 1920s and 1930s, winning the district championship in this sport in 1922, 1923, 1924, 1925, 1928, 1929, 1930, 1931, 1932, 1933, 1934, 1935, and then again in 1946.

The club played at their highest level in Division II, which was then the second tier of Swedish football, in seasons 1953/1954-1954/1955, 1959 and 1960. In 1941 and again in 1952 the club lost the final of the Norrland championship.

== Season to season ==
Season	Level	Division	Section	Position	Notes
1993	Tier 4	Division 3	Mellersta Norrland	7th	
1994	Tier 4	Division 3	Mellersta Norrland	8th	
1995	Tier 4	Division 3	Mellersta Norrland	9th ▼	Lost Relegation Playoffs
1996	Tier 5	Division 4	Ångermanland	1st ▲	Won Promotion Playoffs
1997	Tier 4	Division 3	Mellersta Norrland	8th	
1998	Tier 4	Division 3	Mellersta Norrland	7th	
1999	Tier 4	Division 3	Mellersta Norrland	6th	
2000	Tier 4	Division 3	Mellersta Norrland	10th ▼	
2001	Tier 5	Division 4	Ångermanland	6th	
2002	Tier 5	Division 4	Ångermanland	4th	
2003	Tier 5	Division 4	Ångermanland	10th	
2004	Tier 5	Division 4	Ångermanland	1st ▲	
2005	Tier 4	Division 3	Mellersta Norrland	11th ▼	
2006*	Tier 6	Division 4	Ångermanland	2nd	
2007	Tier 6	Division 4	Ångermanland	1st ▲	
2008	Tier 5	Division 3	Mellersta Norrland	1st ▲	
2009	Tier 4	Division 2	Norra Svealand	7th	
2010	Tier 4	Division 2	Norrland	6th	
2011	Tier 4	Division 2	Norrland	11th ▼	
2012	Tier 5	Division 3	Mellersta Norrland	12th ▼	
2013	Tier 6	Division 4	Ångermanland	3rd	
2014	Tier 6	Division 4	Ångermanland	5th	
2015	Tier 6	Division 4	Ångermanland	2nd	
2016	Tier 6	Division 4	Ångermanland	2nd	Lost Promotion Playoffs
2017	Tier 6	Division 4	Ångermanland	4th	
2018	Tier 6	Division 4	Ångermanland	1st ▲	
2019	Tier 5	Division 3	Mellersta Norrland	12th	Relegation avoided**
2020	Tier 5	Division 3	Mellersta Norrland	5th	
2021	Tier 5	Division 3	Mellersta Norrland	1st ▲	No playoff due to COVID-19
2022	Tier 4	Division 2	Norrland	9th	
2023	Tier 4	Division 2	Norrland		

* League restructuring in 2006 resulted in a new division being created at Tier 3 and subsequent divisions dropping a level.

** Though the team placed low enough to be relegated, they were effectively merged with Härnösands FF at the end of the season resulting in their assumption of Härnösands FF's place in Division 3.

== Attendances ==
In recent seasons the club have had the following average attendances:

Season	Average attendance	Division / Section	Level
2005	177	Div 3 Mellersta Norrland	Tier 4
2006	Not available	Div 4 Ångermanland	Tier 6
2007	Not available	Div 4 Ångermanland	Tier 6
2008	225	Div 3 Mellersta Norrland	Tier 5
2009	285	Div 2 Norra Svealand	Tier 4
2010	273	Div 2 Norrland	Tier 4
2011	209	Div 2 Norrland	Tier 4

* Attendances are provided in the Publikliga sections of the Svenska Fotbollförbundet website.

== Staff and board members ==
- President: Christer Solgevik
- Vice President: Håkan Lönnefors
- Treasurer : Bo Westin
