= Bodens BK =

Swedish football club

Boden
- Full name: Bodens Bollklubb
- Nickname: BBK
- Founded: 2 November 1916; 108 years ago
- Ground: Bodens Energi Arena, Boden, Sweden
- Capacity: 5,300 seats, FIFA 2-star qualification
- Chairman: Peter Uneby
- Manager: Christian Samuelsson
- League: Div 2 Norrland
- 2023: Ettan Norra, 15th ▼
- Website: https://www.svenskalag.se/bbkff
Home colours	Away colours

Bodens BK is a Swedish football club located in Boden in Norrbotten. The club was formed on 2 November 1916 and began playing soccer in 1918. It is currently playing in the third tier of Swedish football, Division 1.

== Linguistics ==
Note that the s in the first part of the club name (Bodens) is the Swedish possessive s, meaning that it is not correct to call the club just Bodens. Correct forms are Bodens Bandyklubb (the complete name, very formal), Bodens BK (abbreviated formal), BBK (abbreviated informal), or just Boden (since there are no other football clubs with the town name Boden in their name). Bandyklubb means bandy club, but the club has actually not been playing bandy since 1966.

== History ==
During the three seasons of 2003 to 2005, Boden played in the second highest division, Superettan, which made them the northernmost team in Swedish professional football by a margin of 400 km or more, depending on season.

After successfully staying up with some margin in 2003, the ensuing season saw Boden barely scrape through to avoid relegation on the last day of the season. The 2005 Superettan campaign appeared to be the most successful thus far, and included memorable victories against teams such as the previous year's top-flight residents Örebro SK (1–0) and AIK (5–1). With 24 games played and stunning form Boden seemed safe at mid-table, but failure to win or even draw any of their last six games, together with the Phoenix-like resurrection of near-discarded Mjällby AIF, saw the latter team secure a new contract while relegating Boden to the newly recreated Division 1.

For the 2006 season, the club which had managed to keep hold of several key players, entertained an outspoken ambition of instantly returning to Superettan. However, injuries to important staff such as the two main new signings, New Zealand striker Brent Fisher and American midfielder Ryan Caugherty, as well as poor results away from home, meant the team finished at a mediocre 8th place. The following season resulted in another mid-table finish. In 2008, Boden were relegated from Division 1 after finishing last, failing to record a single win in their last nine games.

Unlike what had been the case after their Superettan relegation in 2005, Boden did manage to immediately bounce back from Division 2 in 2009. In their first season back at Sweden's fourth tier level since 1998, the club produced a strong season finish, winning eight out of their last nine games and eventually the league, five points clear of local rivals IFK Luleå. Once back in Division 1, the objective for 2010 was survival, which was ensured only in the last game of the season, when Boden defeated Carlstad United away from home, leapfrogging that team into 10th place and a renewed contract. Unable to repeat the accomplishment, Boden were again relegated to Division 2 in 2011, finishing nine points from safety and winning only four league games.

In the two years that followed, Boden were unable to regain promotion, finishing fifth in Division 2 on both occasions. In 2014, the club produced an eighth-place finish, after uninspiring results.

== Organization ==
The club is affiliated to the Norrbottens Fotbollförbund.

== Achievements ==
- Division 2/Division 1/Superettan:
  - Best placement (3rd): 1955–56
- Norrländska Mästerskapet:
  - Winners (8): 1926, 1928, 1929, 1936, 1937, 1938, 1941, 1944
  - Runners-up (3): 1925, 1939, 1949

== Season to season ==
Season	Level	Division	Section	Position	Movements
1994	Tier 4	Division 3	Norra Norrland	2nd	Promoted
1995	Tier 3	Division 2	Norrland	5th	
1996	Tier 3	Division 2	Norrland	5th	
1997	Tier 3	Division 2	Norrland	10th	Relegated
1998	Tier 4	Division 3	Norra Norrland	1st	Promoted
1999	Tier 3	Division 2	Norrland	8th	
2000	Tier 3	Division 2	Norrland	2nd	
2001	Tier 3	Division 2	Norrland	2nd	
2002	Tier 3	Division 2	Norrland	1st	Promoted
2003	Tier 2	Superettan		11th	
2004	Tier 2	Superettan		13th	
2005	Tier 2	Superettan		14th	Relegated
2006*	Tier 3	Division 1	Norra	8th	
2007	Tier 3	Division 1	Norra	7th	
2008	Tier 3	Division 1	Norra	14th	Relegated
2009	Tier 4	Division 2	Norrland	1st	Promoted
2010	Tier 3	Division 1	Norra	10th	
2011	Tier 3	Division 1	Norra	13th	Relegated
2012	Tier 4	Division 2	Norrland	5th	
2013	Tier 4	Division 2	Norrland	5th	
2014	Tier 4	Division 2	Norrland	8th	
2015	Tier 4	Division 2	Norrland	4th	
2016	Tier 4	Division 2	Norrland	5th	
2017	Tier 4	Division 2	Norrland	7th	
2018	Tier 4	Division 2	Norrland	1st	Promoted
2019	Tier 3	Division 1	Norra	14th	Relegated
2020	Tier 4	Division 2	Norrland		

* League restructuring in 2006 resulted in a new division being created at Tier 3 and subsequent divisions dropping a level.

== Players ==
=== First-team squad ===
As of 5 September 2023

Note: Flags indicate national team as defined under FIFA eligibility rules; some limited exceptions apply. Players may hold more than one non-FIFA nationality.

No.	Pos.	Nation	Player
1	GK	SWE	Simon Bandh
2	DF	SWE	Felix Gustavsson
3	DF	SWE	Abdukarim Silla
4	MF	SWE	Kevin Roberts
5	DF	SWE	Andreas Wärja
6	DF	SWE	Hampus Myske
7	MF	ENG	Josh Chatee
8	MF	SWE	Emanuel Swedi
9	MF	SWE	Adam Samuelsson
10	FW	LBR	Sam Johnson
11	MF	SWE	Renan Correa Faustini
12	MF	SWE	Jack Nilsson
14	MF	USA	Vincenzo Candela

No.	Pos.	Nation	Player
15	MF	ERI	Saber Amine Hejai
16	MF	USA	Steve Zishim Bawa
17	DF	SWE	Anton Hallstensson
20	FW	SWE	Nisse Nilsson
21	DF	SWE	Jonatan Wikström
23	MF	ERI	Sargal Amine Hejai
33	MF	SWE	William Roberts
35	DF	SWE	Linus Sahlin
44	GK	SWE	Rasmus Granholm Fredriksson
77	FW	ARG	Valentín Álvarez
88	FW	SWE	William Nordell
-	MF	VEN	Cesar Samper

=== Out on loan ===
Note: Flags indicate national team as defined under FIFA eligibility rules; some limited exceptions apply. Players may hold more than one non-FIFA nationality.

No.	Pos.	Nation	Player

== Attendances ==
In recent seasons Bodens BK FF have had the following average attendances:

Season	Average attendance	Division / Section	Level
2002	537	Division 2 Norrland	Tier 3
2003	2,158	Superettan	Tier 2
2004	1,880	Superettan	Tier 2
2005	2,537	Superettan	Tier 2
2006	1,043	Div 1 Norra	Tier 3
2007	1,043	Div 1 Norra	Tier 3
2008	1,038	Div 1 Norra	Tier 3
2009	1,352	Div 2 Norrland	Tier 4
2010	809	Div 1 Norra	Tier 3
2011	1,190	Div 1 Norra	Tier 3
2012	345	Div 2 Norrland	Tier 4
2013	460	Div 2 Norrland	Tier 4
2014	490	Div 2 Norrland	Tier 4
2015	355	Div 2 Norrland	Tier 4
2016	301	Div 2 Norrland	Tier 4
2017	213	Div 2 Norrland	Tier 4
2018	?	Div 2 Norrland	Tier 4
2019	?	Div 1 Norra	Tier 3
2020		Div 2 Norrland	Tier 4

* Attendances are provided in the Publikliga sections of the Svenska Fotbollförbundet website.
